= History of Canadian animation =

The History of Canadian animation involves a considerable element of the realities of a country neighbouring the United States and both competitiveness and co-operation across the border.

== History ==
=== Early history ===
The earliest known pieces of Canadian animation were paper animated 35mm films created by Jean Arsin and Charles Lambly in 1910, but all of these are now lost. Romulus and Remus, a 25-minute film by Lambly for the Roman Catholic Archdiocese of Montreal, was made in 1926, but is now lost. The Man Who Woke Up, created in 1919 by J.A. Norling and William Ganson Rose for the Federated Budget Board of Winnipeg, is the oldest surviving piece of animation.

In 1927, Bryant Fryer proposed silhouette animation films to Cranfield and Clarke, the producers of Carry on, Sergeant!. His films were funded by Filmart and created the Shadowlaughs shorts with Geoffrey Keighley. These were never theatrically released due to financial difficulties faced by Cranfield and Clarke. Fryer was unable to produce more animation until gaining the financial backing of Albert Gooderham in 1933. He was unable to find distributors due to a monopoly by Famous Players, which only distributed Fleischer Studios shorts.

Raoul Barré opened an animation studio with William C. Nolan in 1914, and hired Gregory La Cava and Frank Moser. Barré streamlined the animation process by reducing the amount of drawing needed. He partnered with Charles Bowers, but went into retirement in 1919 after disagreements with him. He left retirement in 1926, and animated ten Felix the Cat shorts.

Prior to 1939, animation production was a very low scale with small production that were often discouraged by theatre chains like Famous Players. Such companies did not want Canadian competition to their parent companies' product. However, independent animators such as Jack (J.A). Norling in Winnipeg, Jean Arsin and Charles Lambly in Montreal, and Harold Peberdy, Bert Cob, Walter H. Swaffield and Bryant Fryer in Toronto, were able to produce short animations, primarily for advertising and educational purposes.

==== National Film Board ====
The National Film Board of Canada was organized in 1939, under the leadership of John Grierson. Grierson initially contracted the Walt Disney Company for $20,000 to make four films (Stop That Tank!, The Thrifty Pig, 7 Wise Dwarfs, and Donald's Decision) for the war effort and selling war bonds. The NFB held the distribution rights for these films until 1945. Philip Ragan, an American animator, was hired as part of the agreement with the National War Finance Committee and Ragan produced over thirty films. The NFB did not have an internal animation department until Grierson brought Norman McLaren to Canada in 1941, and produced Mail Early, his first film there. McLaren requested workers in 1942, and hired from École des beaux-arts de Montréal and OCAD University. The department, Studio A, became an official unit in January 1943. By 1945, 35 of the 335 films produced by the NFB were from the animation unit.

Jim Mackay replaced McLaren as animation director in 1945. Wolf Koenig, Colin Low, and Robert Verrall joined that year. Mackay's Teeth Are to Keep was praised by Stephen Bosustow, co-founder of United Productions of America, as "one of the freshest, best pictures of its kind that we have ever had the pleasure of seeing". The NFB experimented with cel animation in the 1940s with Auprès de ma blonde, Good-Bye Mr. Gyp, and Bid It Up Sucker, but animators were still using paper cutout animation following World War II.

Mackay resigned in 1949, and was replaced by 25-year old Low in 1950. Allan Ackman started Teamwork - Past and Present, but was fired for his communist views. Low and six animators completed the film which was the first colour cel animated film by the NFB. The Romance of Transportation in Canada was nominated for an Academy Award in 1953. Evelyn Lambart disliked cel animation as it was too simplistic and had "people who just did cel and didn't have to have any brains" while Koenig supported it as the only way to have fluid animation and full facial expressions.

McLaren recruited French-Canadian animators from École des beaux-arts de Montréal, including René Jodoin. Jodoin created a French animation unit in 1966, which included Laurent Coderre and Bernard Longpré. The unit was given an initial budget of $50,000. Jodoin led the unit until his replacement in 1978, by Robert Forget, who led until 1989. Yves Leduc replaced Forget and led the unit until 1996. Pierre Hébert replaced Leduc.

Koenig and Verrall co-managed the NFB animation studio from 1964 to 1967, Verrall alone until 1972, when Koenig replaced him. Koenig managed the studio until his replacement by Derek Lamb in 1975. The studio won two Academy Awards and received three other nominations during Lamb's tenure.

The NFB suffered from financial troubles in the 1970s and enforced layoffs, including in the animation studio. The computer animation program, which was established by Forget, was suspended due to budget cuts although the NFB's French Animated Studio, founded by René Jodoin in 1966, created Peter Foldes's Metadata in 1971, and the Hunger in 1973. The NFB returned to computer animation in the 1980s, but was reduced under Leduc.

==== Development ====
John Phillips and Harry Gutkin founded Phillips-Gutkin-Associates in Winnipeg in 1948, and it was the largest animation studio in Canada in the 1950s. The company created animated commercials, but the Canadian Broadcasting Corporation banned animated commercials aimed at children. Gutkin met with John Halas in 1960, about creating T. Eddy Bear, what would have been the first Canadian animated television show, but it was not made.

Le village enchanté was the first recorded animated feature film in Canadian history and Return to Oz which was based on Tales of the Wizard of Oz, the first recorded Canadian animated television series, was the second recorded animated feature film.

Al Guest formed Spectrum Productions, the company's name was altered multiple times, in 1957. Guest made a $1 million deal with Steve Krantz in 1967, to make 52 episodes of Rocket Robin Hood. Krantz sent Ralph Bakshi to oversee production. Guest attempted to not deliver the show due to non-payment, but Bakshi took any materials possible and completed the series with Krantz using material from Spider-Man. Guest was unable to afford a lawsuit and liquidated his company.

One of the main sources of work for animation companies in Canada were animated commercials, but Quebec passed legislation in 1972 prohibiting animation in commercials aided at children.

Michael Mills left the NFB in 1973, and formed Michael Mills Productions in 1974. The company's 1980 short History of the World in Three Minutes Flat was nominated for an Academy Award.

Kenn Perkins, an animator from Winnipeg, formed Kenn Perkins and Associates in the 1960s. Cordell Barker, Brad Caslor, Christopher Hinton, and John Paizs were employed by the company. The company produced animation for Sesame Street through a contract with CBC Winnipeg for four years. The work was grueling and Caslor, the company's second employee, left after two years to form Credo Group with Derek Mazur. Hinton later joined Credo Group.

Primiti Too Taa was the first animated film made for IMAX.

==== Nelvana ====
Michael Hirsh, Patrick Loubert, and other animators formed Laff Arts in 1967. Hirsh and Loubert reformed this with Clive A. Smith into the more professionally-named Nelvana.

Longer term successes began with the establishment of the Canadian animation studio Nelvana Limited in 1971. Before they were huge, they mainly did the production for live-action/animated shorts. These were known as Small Star Cinema, in production from 1974 until 1975. Nelvana took advantage of the new Canadian content broadcast rules to produce a successful series of acclaimed TV specials. They also had some success in the United States, working on productions like the animated segment of Star Wars Holiday Special in 1978.

Ivan Reitman gained a deal with Columbia Pictures to create an animated film and asked Gerald Potterton to oversee it. This film, Heavy Metal, was a box office success. The success of Heavy Metal inspired Nelvana to produce Rock & Rule. The film went $3 million over budget and was a financial failure that heavily indebted Nelvana. The company produced a large amount of television content, "a lot of bad television" according to Hirsh, to pay off this debt.

Nelvana started creating cartoons based on toys, including the Care Bears. The Care Bears Movie, by Nelvana, was the highest-grossing non-Disney animated film at the time of its release. They also produced Care Bears Movie II: A New Generation, The Care Bears Adventure in Wonderland, and Babar: The Movie, but those were less financially successful. In 1999, Nelvana made a $40 million deal with PBS.

=== 1950s–1980s ===
Apart from the National Film Board, Canadian production in the commercial sphere was largely as limited as before. The biggest contribution in the 1960s and much of the 1970s was in the field of voice acting with many major television productions like Rudolph the Red-Nosed Reindeer and Spider-Man sporting Canadian voice actors like Paul Soles and Paul Kligman.

In the 1970s, independent companies were formed to produce low budget children's programming. Some examples are The Undersea Adventures of Captain Nemo, and The Toothbrush Family as well as Ukaliq and The Sunrunners all written, produced and directed by Al Guest and his partner Jean Mathieson at their Toronto company Rainbow Animation.

Two new players suddenly appeared in Ottawa, with Atkinson Film-Arts producing TV specials based on the Jean De Brunhoff Babar books and the Lynn Johnston comic strip For Better or For Worse, as well as the series The Adventures of Teddy Ruxpin, Dennis The Menace, and animation for the film Heavy Metal and the specials and subsequent series of Kevin Gillis' popular The Raccoons. Disputes between Atkinson management and the Raccoons producers led Gillis' Raccoons production partner Sheldon Wiseman to form a new Ottawa studio, Hinton Animation Studios. Hinton took over animation for The Raccoons, and produced animation for projects under Wiseman's own Lacewood Productions. When the studio's feature film The Nutcracker Prince performed poorly at the box office, Hinton found itself unable to pay off the money it borrowed to finance the feature; the situation was further exacerbated by creative tensions between Gillis and Wiseman. Due to these problems, Hinton dissolved in 1990, bringing an end to The Raccoons and Gillis and Wiseman's partnership the following year. Wiseman subsequently reorganized the Hinton animation staff as Lacewood Studios, which produced a new series of For Better or For Worse specials, and co-produced several television series with producers in the United States and France.

In the 1980s the animation department of the French division of the CBC in Montreal took centre stage by winning two Oscars for its animation shorts: Crac in 1981 and The Man Who Planted Trees in 1987. Both were produced by Frédéric Back. In about the same period private and public colleges started offering complete animation programs. In 1984 Sheridan College of Oakville won an Oscar for Charade, by one of its graduating students, Jon Minnis.

Notable NFB shorts during this era included The Street (1976), The Big Snit (1985) and The Cat Came Back (1988).

=== 1990s–2000s ===
With the renaissance of animation in the 1990s, Canadian animation further prospered with conventional fare from companies like Nelvana and Cinar (now part of WildBrain) while innovative work from Mainframe Entertainment such as the first computer animated series, ReBoot drew considerable success on its own.

Cinar was known for Caillou, which aired from 1997 to 2010 and then in the United States on PBS from 2000 to 2021. Although Caillou initially received positive reviews during its original run, it has drawn heavy viewer criticism since its cancellation, notably for the title character's negative behavior starting in the first and second seasons which resulted in four episodes of the show being banned by PBS Kids.

The demand for animators during this time (and also during the slow period of the 1980s) caused a global search for excellent and skilled animators causing many talented Canadians to wander the globe to fill the demand. Many Canadians can be found worldwide in prominent positions in animation companies throughout the world. From Richard Williams directing animation on the Oscar-winning Who Framed Roger Rabbit in the late 1980s in Britain (while also working on his unfinished film The Thief and the Cobbler there as well) to others directing creating and supervising animation in television and commercial studios around the world including many prominent video games such as Halo 2, Rayman and Star Wars: Knights of the Old Republic. Canadians John Kricfalusi and Lynne Naylor were among the founders of the studio Spümcø, creating series such Ren and Stimpy and The Ripping Friends for television, and Weekend Pussy Hunt and The Goddamn George Liquor Program for the emerging web.

In 1997, Teletoon (a bilingual service with separate French-language and English-language feeds) was established as Canada's first dedicated animation television channel whose broadcast licence agreement stipulated at least one original animated television series a season. The O Canada anthology series helped introduce American viewers to the works of the National Film Board.

Companies such as Montreal's Toon Boom and Toronto's Alias Research/Wavefront Technologies and Side Effects Software have not only helped to define international technical standards, but have assumed a leadership role within the computer software industry. Toon Boom's "Harmony", Alias/Wavefront's "Maya" and Side Effects Software's "Houdini" are leading animation software packages used in many animated features and special effects. From shows as simple as The Simpsons (Harmony), South Park (Maya) and Angela Anaconda (Houdini) to special effects as fantastic and complex as those seen in the Harry Potter films (both software packages) and more.

In September 2000, Corus Entertainment acquired Nelvana for $540 million, complementing its children's television networks, YTV and Treehouse TV.

Flash cartoons, which were originally released on the web, began making their way to television; such as March Entertainment's Chilly Beach (2003-2006), on the CBC, as well as Ocnus Productions' Kevin Spencer (1999-2005) and Smiley Guy Studios' Odd Job Jack (2003-2007) on the Comedy Network; also joined by the puppetry show Puppets Who Kill (2002-2006), which had similarly started as an independent one-man live theatre show. After three seasons, Chilly Beach expanded to include two feature films.

In a similar vein, the CGI science fiction comedy show Tripping the Rift aired between 2004 and 2007 on Space and Teletoon. It was animated by Heavy Metal 2000 producer CinéGroupe, after starting out as web shorts. The Happy Tree Friends television series (2006) aired on G4 was animated by Canadian studio Fatkat, and based on the earlier web series of the same name. Queer Duck: The Movie (2006) was a Canadian-British-American co-production based on the web series by Mike Reiss, with similar humour also present in the series Rick & Steve: The Happiest Gay Couple in All the World (2007-2009).

This also signaled the adoption of animation more aimed at adults pioneered in the United States by The Simpsons and specialty blocks such as Adult Swim. Teletoon entered this market in September 2002 with its own adult programming blocks (later to be known as Teletoon at Night and Télétoon la nuit) and original programming. Teletoon originals that aired throughout the decade include Undergrads (2001) and Clone High (2002-2003) (both of which were co-produced with MTV), Daft Planet (2002), Delta State (2004-2005), Zeroman (2004), Bromwell High (2005), Station X (2005), The Wrong Coast (2005), Sons of Butcher (2005-2007), Punch (2008), Life's a Zoo (2008-2009), and The Dating Guy (2008-2010).

G4 also launched its own Adult Digital Distraction on June 9, 2009, before being shut down by the CRTC in late 2011 for violating the station's mandate; the block returned again in 2012. Adult Swim later came to Canada itself on July 4, 2012. The late-night Bionix block aired on YTV from September 10, 2004 to February 7, 2010, airing content aimed at an older audience than usual, including Japanese anime.

The studio a.k.a. Cartoon, led by animator Danny Antonucci, successfully pitched a number of series to U.S. networks like MTV and Cartoon Network. These have included the critically panned The Brothers Grunt, the anthology Cartoon Sushi, and the better-received Ed, Edd n Eddy.

Similar success was attained by Cuppa Coffee Studios working on series like Celebrity Deathmatch, Starveillance, Glenn Martin, DDS, and Ugly Americans.

Nelvana had even experimented in the 1990s with series such as Brad Bird's Family Dog (1993), the British Channel 4 co-production Bob and Margaret (1998-2001), Committed (2001), and John Callahan's Quads! (2001-2002).

Other Canada-UK co-productions have included Aaagh! It's the Mr. Hell Show!, Bromwell High, and Warren United. As well as airing Bob and Margaret, Global later forayed into the adult animation space with Producing Parker (2009-2011) and Bob & Doug (2009-2011), the former by The Raccoons creator Kevin Gillis and the latter based on SCTV sketch characters Bob and Doug McKenzie. The super-hero series Acadieman aired from 2005 to 2009 as a community channel production on Rogers TV. The stop-motion What It's Like Being Alone aired on CBC in 2006, with the puppetry show Mr. Meaty (2006-2009) also featuring darker themes.

APTN also aired its own adult animation, By the Rapids (2008-2012), a landmark for indigenous animation. APTN Kids has also broadcast cartoons such Bizou (2007), Animism (2013), Kagagi (2014), and Lil Glooscap and the Legends of Turtle Island (2022), as well as the stop motion series Wapos Bay (2005-2011) and Guardians Evolution (2014-2015), with the former produced with the assistance of the National Film Board of Canada.

Jennifer Pertsch and Tom McGillis of Fresh TV created a number of popular shows for Teletoon, such as 6teen (2004-2010) and Stoked (2009-2013), as well as a broader franchise with Total Drama (2007-).

Further experimentation and exploration in the art of animation which began with the National Film Board of Canada and the works of Norman Mclaren has continued through the decades through the techniques and films of other NFB animators such as Jacques Drouin, Chris Hinton (Blackfly), Wendy Tilby and Amanda Forbis (When the Day Breaks), Janet Perlman and many others. A few independent organizations such as the Toronto Animated Image Society in Toronto and especially the Quickdraw Animation Society in Calgary have also formed and continue to contribute, explore the art of animation and produce new works by emerging and established Canadian animators and artists. This exploration and blending of assorted and unusual techniques can be seen in the many boutique animation companies and independent animators that have sprung up throughout Canada and has continued to propel Canada's reputation of interesting and innovative animation techniques. The Board also co-produced the feature film The Human Plant in 1996.

CinéGroupe released the animated features Lion of Oz (2000), Heavy Metal 2000 (2000), and Pinocchio 3000 (2004). A multinational co-production The Triplets of Belleville (2003) was nominated for two Academy Awards. A stop-motion feature film Edison and Leo was released in 2008. Nelvana produced the made for television film Wayside: The Movie in 2005, leading to a two season series. A direct-to-video CGI feature The Nuttiest Nutcracker was released in 1999 by Dan Krech Productions.

The Ottawa International Animation Festival which takes place every fall in Ottawa Ontario is one of the largest and most respected animation festivals for drawing professional, commercial, independent and amateur animators and animation enthusiasts alike from all over the world. It is sponsored by the Association internationale du film d'animation, better known as ASIFA with chapters throughout the world.

=== 2010s–2020s ===
In August 2011, NFB Animation Studio executive producer David Verrall retired, after more than 34 years at the NFB including 14 years as head of its English-language animation unit. Verrall produced or executive produced 240 NFB animated films, such as Bob's Birthday, Ryan and The Danish Poet with each winning Academy Awards. He was succeeded by Roddy McManus.

Filipino/Canadian animator Dominic Panganiban started a YouTube channel in August 2012 that as of November 2018 has over 800 million views and 6 million subscribers, ranking him in the 658th place for most subscribed. The channel generally posts videos Domics animates in which he tells a story about his life, an aspect of it, or his thoughts.

In 2013, the film The Legend of Sarila was released, cited as the first Canadian theatrically released 3D animated feature film (The Nuttiest Nutcracker had been released all the way back in 1999, but only as direct-to-video). 10th Ave. Productions would continue releasing features; namely Mission Kathmandu: The Adventures of Nelly and Simon (2017), Felix and the Treasure of Morgäa (2021) and Katak: The Brave Beluga (2023).

On March 4, 2013, Corus Entertainment announced that it would acquire full ownership of Teletoon Canada Inc. Corus's purchase was cleared by the Competition Bureau two weeks later on March 18; the transaction was approved by the CRTC on December 20, 2013, and completed on January 1, 2014.

In 2014, Canadian animation studio ToonBox Entertainment produced the Canadian-South Korean co-production The Nut Job, directed by Peter Lepeniotis and starring Will Arnett. While it garnered negative reviews, it was one of the highest-budgeted and highest-grossing Canadian films of all time, with a cost of $42 million and a worldwide gross of $107 million as of September 2014. The film would receive a sequel, The Nut Job 2: Nutty by Nature (2017), and the studio would also release Spark: A Space Tail (2016). CarpeDiem Film would release the French language films Snowtime! (2015), Racetime (2018), and the spin-off series Snowsnaps (2018), with English versions released by eOne.

Nitrogen Studios produced the animation for the adult animated feature film Sausage Party starring Seth Rogen in 2016, although it became embroiled in controversy over working conditions during the project. As Cinesite Vancouver it would also produce The Addams Family (2019) and The Addams Family 2 (2021) for Metro-Goldwyn-Mayer and Universal Pictures. The 2022 Pixar Animation Studios film Turning Red is set in Toronto in 2002, and directed by Canadian born filmmaker Domee Shi, prompting debates about whether the film qualifies as Canadian content. Pixar had briefly opened a Vancouver branch called Pixar Canada in 2010, but it closed by 2013. The 2022 film The Sea Beast by Canadian-American animator Chris Williams (best known for the 2014 Academy Award for Best Animated Feature winner Big Hero 6) proved a commercial and critical success for Netflix Animation, with production assisted by Sony Pictures Imageworks.

A co-production between animators in Canada, France and Belgium, the 2015 feature film April and the Extraordinary World released to positive critical reception. A later Canada-French co-production was released in 2022 called Dounia and the Princess of Aleppo. A French-language drama film Ville Neuve was released in 2018 by Félix Dufour-Laperrière, who in 2021 released the animated documentary Archipelago. Asphalt Watches was released in 2013 and screened at the 2013 Toronto International Film Festival. Guru Studio helped co-produce the film The Breadwinner (2017) with acclaimed Irish studio Cartoon Saloon based on the novel by Deborah Ellis, as well as producing Justin Time, Ever After High, and the international children's hit PAW Patrol, spawning multiple feature films.

Slap Happy Cartoons has produced several productions for Warner Bros., including for Tom and Jerry and Teen Titans Go!. On October 26, 2016, American media company Frederator Networks, Inc. (of The Fairly OddParents and Adventure Time) created a merger with Canadian animation studio Rainmaker Entertainment (of ReBoot and Beast Wars: Transformers) and Ezrin Hirsh, Inc. (partners are producers Bob Ezrin and Michael Hirsh of Nelvana) to form Wow Unlimited Media. Comic book publisher Arcana Studio opened its animation division in 2012, producing features such as The Clockwork Girl (2014), Pixies (2015), The Steam Engines of Oz (2017), Panda vs. Aliens (2023), and Heroes of the Golden Masks (2023), as well as several films spun from Howard Lovecraft and the Frozen Kingdom (2016).

A 13-episode animated series based on the hit live action Canadian sitcom Corner Gas (2004-2009) was announced on December 19, 2016. The series features the voices of many of the original series' cast members, except for Janet Wright who died in 2016. It was scheduled to début in 2017 on the Comedy Network, but was ultimately delayed until April 2, 2018 under the official title of Corner Gas Animated with animation by Smiley Guy Studios. Its first episode, "Bone Dry", was the highest rated premiere in the history of the Comedy Network. The fourth and final season aired in 2021. A similar revival of a live-action hit, Trailer Park Boys: The Animated Series, launched in 2019 for Netflix. As well as the aforementioned Bob & Doug (2009-2011), a previous animated version of a live-action character was Super Dave: Daredevil for Hire (1992) featuring Super Dave Osborne from Bizarre.

Corus' adult blocks (Teletoon at Night, Adult Swim Canada, and Télétoon la nuit) continued airing new original series; such as Knuckleheads (2012), Crash Canyon (2011-2013), Fugget About It (2012–2016), 2 Nuts and a Richard! (2015), and The Bizarre Stories of Professor Zarbi (2019) The English-language blocks were shut down in 2019, ahead of a re-launch of Showcase Action as a full-time Adult Swim channel (the first of its kind for the brand); while Teletoon's English channel was relaunched as a new incarnation of Cartoon Network (Canada) in 2023. Corus continued to commission adult animated shows for Télétoon la nuit and the Adult Swim channel; such as Doomsday Brothers (2020) and Red Ketchup (2023). Psi Cops, which premiered in 2023, was the first original series to be produced solely for the Adult Swim channel.

Other Canadian adult animated streaming shows that premiered during the decade include Look Mom! Productions' Gary and His Demons (2018-) and Doomlands (2022-); as well as Mother Up! (2013), and Young Love (2023-).

Atomic Cartoons (best known for Atomic Betty (2004-2008)), has co-produced several cartoons for American distribution; including Click and Clack's As the Wrench Turns (2008), Teenage Euthanasia (2021-2023), Little Demon (2022) and Oddballs (2022-2023). The studio is currently producing Super Team Canada (2024), the first animated original for Crave.

The Cuphead Show! (2022) was produced for Netflix based on the Canadian developed video game, Cuphead, inspired by the golden age of American animation. The animation was handled by Lighthouse Studios, a co-venture between Mercury Filmworks and Cartoon Saloon.

The Kratt Brothers, previously of the puppetry and claymation based Zoboomafoo (1999-2001), launched a new cartoon series Wild Kratts on public television stations PBS Kids in the United States and TVOKids and Knowledge Network in Canada in 2011, and as of 2024 remains in production. Zoboomafoo had featured the talents of Canadian puppeteer Gord Robertson, of The Jim Henson Company, while Wild Kratts features animation by 9 Story Media Group.

Alongside domestic productions such as Almost Naked Animals, Camp Lakebottom, Futz!, and Fugget About It; 9 Story has also produced later seasons of Arthur, Clifford the Big Red Dog, The Magic School Bus Rides Again, Creative Galaxy, Daniel Tiger's Neighborhood, and Xavier Riddle and the Secret Museum.

By the 2020s, Cyberchase, which originally premiered in 2002, had been running for fifth-teen seasons and 148 episodes; making it one of the longest-running Canadian animated shows. After the first five seasons where handled by Nelvana, PiP Animation Services (who also co-produced the film Lamya's Poem (2021)) produced the series' animation since 2007.

Jam Filled Entertainment took over animation of the British classic Thomas & Friends from 2013 until its conclusion in 2021, while previous series from 2008 on having been produced by Nitrogen Studios.

Notable NFB shorts from this era included Torill Kove's Me and My Moulton and Theodore Ushev's Blind Vaysha, each were nominated for an Oscar. The Board also co-produced the feature film Window Horses (2016) with Ann Marie Fleming and Sandra Oh. Fleming had previously worked with them on the short film I Was a Child of Holocaust Survivors (2010).

Canadian music video director Winston Hacking made the satirical 2018 animated collage film Erodium Thunk out of old magazine ads and TV commercials.

Angakusajaujuq: The Shaman's Apprentice (2020), featuring Canadian Inuit characters, won Best Independent Short Film at the Festival Stop Montreal.

An eight-part documentary about the 1990s CGI pioneer ReBoot, entitled ReBoot ReWind, was announced to launch on Telus Storyhive on September 24, 2024. This effort coincided with the remastering of the series from its original D-1 tapes, with the first episode released on YouTube on September 10, 2024 to mark its thirtieth anniversary.

== See also ==
- Canadian animators
- History of animation
- History of Canada
- Cinema of Canada
- Independent animation
- List of Canadian animated television series

== Works cited ==
- Clandfield, David (1987). Canadian Film. Oxford University Press. ISBN 0195405811.
- Evans, Gary (1991). In the National Interest: A Chronicle of the National Film Board of Canada from 1949 to 1989. University of Toronto Press. ISBN 0802027849.
- Mazurkewich, Karen (1999). Cartoon Capers: The History of Canadian Animators. McArthur & Company Publishing. ISBN 1-55278-093-7.
- Melnyk, George (2004). One Hundred Years of Canadian Cinema. University of Toronto Press. ISBN 080203568X.
