= List of adult animated television series of the 2010s =

This is a list of adult animated television series of the 2010s (including streaming television series); that is, animated programs targeted towards audiences aged 18 and over in mind. Works in this medium could be considered adult for any number of reasons, which include the incorporation of explicit or suggestive sexual content, graphic violence, profane language, dark humour, or other thematic elements inappropriate for children. Works in this genre may explore philosophical, political, or social issues. Some productions are noted for their complex and/or experimental storytelling and animation techniques. Adult animation is typically defined as animation which skews toward adults. It is also described as something that "formative youths should stay far, far away from" or has adult humor and comes in various styles, but especially sitcoms and comedies. These animations can also "appeal to wide swaths of viewers," including those aged 18–34. AdWeek called adult animation "animated projects aimed at grown-ups, not kids."

In North America, there is children's animation, adult animation, and young adult animation, with various mature animations in the United States, especially in television series. This page mainly includes series in North America and Europe, on programming blocks such as Adult Swim, Animation Domination, Adult Swim (in Canada), and others, with other mature animations, including web series and animated films covered on other pages. These series should not be confused with cartoon pornography.

== List ==
=== United States ===
| Title | Genre | Seasons/episodes | Show creator(s) | Original release | Network | Studio | Age rating | Technique | Source |
|---|---|---|---|---|---|---|---|---|---|
| Black Panther | Superhero | 1 season, 6 episodes | Reginald Hudlin | January 16, 2010 – January 30, 2010 | BET | Marvel Knights Animation | TV-14 | Flash | |
| Black Panther | Superhero | 1 season, 6 episodes | Reginald Hudlin | January 16, 2010 – January 30, 2010 | BET | Hudlin Entertainment | TV-14 | Flash | |
| Black Panther | Superhero | 1 season, 6 episodes | Reginald Hudlin | January 16, 2010 – January 30, 2010 | BET | Titmouse, Inc. | TV-14 | Flash | |
| Black Panther | Superhero | 1 season, 6 episodes | Reginald Hudlin | January 16, 2010 – January 30, 2010 | BET | BET | TV-14 | Flash | |
| Ugly Americans | Sitcom | 2 seasons, 31 episodes | Devin Clark | March 17, 2010 – April 25, 2012 | Comedy Central | Tookie Wilson Productions | TV-14 | Flash | |
| Ugly Americans | Sitcom | 2 seasons, 31 episodes | Devin Clark | March 17, 2010 – April 25, 2012 | Comedy Central | Augenblick Studios | TV-14 | Flash | |
| Ugly Americans | Sitcom | 2 seasons, 31 episodes | Devin Clark | March 17, 2010 – April 25, 2012 | Comedy Central | Cuppa Coffee Animation (2010) | TV-14 | Flash | |
| Ugly Americans | Sitcom | 2 seasons, 31 episodes | Devin Clark | March 17, 2010 – April 25, 2012 | Comedy Central | Turner Studios | TV-14 | Flash | |
| Ugly Americans | Sitcom | 2 seasons, 31 episodes | Devin Clark | March 17, 2010 – April 25, 2012 | Comedy Central | Big Jump Productions | TV-14 | Flash | |
| Ugly Americans | Sitcom | 2 seasons, 31 episodes | Devin Clark | March 17, 2010 – April 25, 2012 | Comedy Central | Solis / Markle Animation Productions (2011–2012) | TV-14 | Flash | |
| Neighbors from Hell | Sitcom | 1 season, 10 episodes | Pam Brady | June 7, 2010 – July 26, 2010 | TBS | 20th Century Fox Television | TV-14 | Flash | |
| Neighbors from Hell | Sitcom | 1 season, 10 episodes | Pam Brady | June 7, 2010 – July 26, 2010 | TBS | Bento Box Entertainment | TV-14 | Flash | |
| Neighbors from Hell | Sitcom | 1 season, 10 episodes | Pam Brady | June 7, 2010 – July 26, 2010 | TBS | MoonBoy Animation | TV-14 | Flash | |
| Neighbors from Hell | Sitcom | 1 season, 10 episodes | Pam Brady | June 7, 2010 – July 26, 2010 | TBS | Wounded Poodle | TV-14 | Flash | |
| Mary Shelley's Frankenhole | Black comedy | 2 seasons, 20 episodes | Dino Stamatopoulos | June 27, 2010 – March 25, 2012 | Adult Swim | Fragical Productions (season 1) | TV-MA | Stop-motion | |
| Mary Shelley's Frankenhole | Science fiction comedy | 2 seasons, 20 episodes | Dino Stamatopoulos | June 27, 2010 – March 25, 2012 | Adult Swim | ShadowMachine (season 1) | TV-14 (some episodes) | Stop-motion | |
| Mary Shelley's Frankenhole | Science fiction comedy | 2 seasons, 20 episodes | Dino Stamatopoulos | June 27, 2010 – March 25, 2012 | Adult Swim | Starburns Industries (season 2) | TV-14 (some episodes) | Stop-motion | |
| Mary Shelley's Frankenhole | Science fiction comedy | 2 seasons, 20 episodes | Dino Stamatopoulos | June 27, 2010 – March 25, 2012 | Adult Swim | Williams Street | TV-14 (some episodes) | Stop-motion | |
| Off the Air | Anthology | 14 seasons, 52 episodes | Dave Hughes | January 1, 2011 – present | Adult Swim | Williams Street | TV-PG | Flash | |
| Off the Air | Anthology | 14 seasons, 52 episodes | Dave Hughes | January 1, 2011 – present | Adult Swim | Million Monkeys Inc. | TV-14 (some episodes) | CGI | |
| Off the Air | Anthology | 14 seasons, 52 episodes | Dave Hughes | January 1, 2011 – present | Adult Swim | Million Monkeys Inc. | TV-MA (some episodes) | Live-Action | |
| Dan Vs. | Sitcom; Comedy | 3 seasons, 53 episodes | Dan Mandel; Chris Pearson | January 1, 2011 – March 9, 2013 | The Hub | Film Roman; The Hatchery | TV-PG | Flash | |
| Bob's Burgers | Sitcom | 16 seasons, 313 episodes | Loren Bouchard | January 9, 2011 – present | Fox | Bento Box Entertainment (Note: Animation services) | TV-PG | Flash (Note: Season 1) | |
| Bob's Burgers | Sitcom | 16 seasons, 313 episodes | Loren Bouchard | January 9, 2011 – present | Fox | Wilo Productions | TV-14 (some episodes) | Traditional (Note: Seasons 2-present) | |
| Bob's Burgers | Sitcom | 16 seasons, 313 episodes | Loren Bouchard | January 9, 2011 – present | Fox | 20th Television | TV-14 (some episodes) | Traditional | |
| Mongo Wrestling Alliance | Comedy | 1 season, 10 episodes | Tommy Blacha | January 23, 2011 – July 31, 2011 | Adult Swim | Williams Street | TV-MA | Flash | |
| Mongo Wrestling Alliance | Comedy | 1 season, 10 episodes | Tommy Blacha | January 23, 2011 – July 31, 2011 | Adult Swim | Mirari Films | TV-14 (one episode) | Flash | |
| Soul Quest Overdrive | Comedy | 1 season, 4 episodes | Matt Maiellaro | May 24, 2011 | Adult Swim | Williams Street | TV-MA | Flash | |
| Soul Quest Overdrive | Comedy | 1 season, 4 episodes | Dave Willis | May 24, 2011 | Adult Swim | Radical Axis | TV-MA | Flash | |
| China, IL | Comedy | 3 seasons, 30 episodes | Brad Neely | October 2, 2011 – June 14, 2015 | Adult Swim | Neely Comics | TV-14 | Flash | |
| China, IL | Comedy | 3 seasons, 30 episodes | Brad Neely | October 2, 2011 – June 14, 2015 | Adult Swim | Working for Monsters | TV-MA (1 episode) | Flash | |
| China, IL | Comedy | 3 seasons, 30 episodes | Brad Neely | October 2, 2011 – June 14, 2015 | Adult Swim | Titmouse, Inc. | TV-MA (1 episode) | Flash | |
| China, IL | Comedy | 3 seasons, 30 episodes | Brad Neely | October 2, 2011 – June 14, 2015 | Adult Swim | Williams Street | TV-MA (1 episode) | Flash | |
| Good Vibes | Sitcom | 1 season, 12 episodes | David Gordon Green | October 27, 2011 – December 29, 2011 | MTV | Werner Entertainment | TV-14 | Flash | |
| Good Vibes | Sitcom | 1 season, 12 episodes | Brad Ableson | October 27, 2011 – December 29, 2011 | MTV | Rough House Pictures | TV-14 | Flash | |
| Good Vibes | Sitcom | 1 season, 12 episodes | Mike Clements | October 27, 2011 – December 29, 2011 | MTV | Not the QB Pro. | TV-14 | Flash | |
| Good Vibes | Sitcom | 1 season, 12 episodes | Mike Clements | October 27, 2011 – December 29, 2011 | MTV | Warner Horizon Television | TV-14 | Flash | |
| Good Vibes | Sitcom | 1 season, 12 episodes | Mike Clements | October 27, 2011 – December 29, 2011 | MTV | 6 Point Harness | TV-14 | Flash | |
| Good Vibes | Sitcom | 1 season, 12 episodes | Mike Clements | October 27, 2011 – December 29, 2011 | MTV | MTV Animation | TV-14 | Flash | |
| Allen Gregory | Sitcom | 1 season, 7 episodes | Jonah Hill | October 30, 2011 – December 18, 2011 | Fox | J. Paul/A. Mogel/D. Goodman Productions | TV-14 | Flash | |
| Allen Gregory | Sitcom | 1 season, 7 episodes | | October 30, 2011 – December 18, 2011 | Fox | JHF | TV-14 | Flash | |
| Allen Gregory | Sitcom | 1 season, 7 episodes | Andrew Mogel | October 30, 2011 – December 18, 2011 | Fox | Chernin Entertainment | TV-14 | Flash | |
| Allen Gregory | Sitcom | 1 season, 7 episodes | Jarrad Paul | October 30, 2011 – December 18, 2011 | Fox | Bento Box Entertainment | TV-14 | Flash | |
| Allen Gregory | Sitcom | 1 season, 7 episodes | Jarrad Paul | October 30, 2011 – December 18, 2011 | Fox | 20th Century Fox Television | TV-14 | Flash | |
| Napoleon Dynamite | Sitcom | 1 season, 6 episodes | Jared Hess | January 15, 2012 – March 4, 2012 | Fox | Hess Films | TV-PG | Traditional | |
| Napoleon Dynamite | Sitcom | 1 season, 6 episodes | Jerusha Hess | January 15, 2012 – March 4, 2012 | Fox | Scully Productions | TV-PG | Traditional | |
| Napoleon Dynamite | Sitcom | 1 season, 6 episodes | Jerusha Hess | January 15, 2012 – March 4, 2012 | Fox | 20th Century Fox Television | TV-PG | Traditional | |
| Unsupervised | Sitcom | 1 season, 13 episodes | David Hornsby | January 19, 2012 – December 20, 2012 | FX | Floyd County Productions | TV-MA | Flash | |
| Unsupervised | Sitcom | 1 season, 13 episodes | Rob Rosell | January 19, 2012 – December 20, 2012 | FX | RCG Productions | TV-14 (some episodes) | Flash | |
| Unsupervised | Sitcom | 1 season, 13 episodes | Scott Marder | January 19, 2012 – December 20, 2012 | FX | The Professional Writing Company | TV-14 (some episodes) | Flash | |
| Unsupervised | Sitcom | 1 season, 13 episodes | Scott Marder | January 19, 2012 – December 20, 2012 | FX | FX Productions | TV-14 (some episodes) | Flash | |
| Black Dynamite | Action | 2 seasons, 20 episodes | Michael Jai White | July 15, 2012 – January 10, 2015 | Adult Swim | Ars Nova Entertainment | TV-MA | Traditional/Flash | |
| Black Dynamite | Comedy | 2 seasons, 20 episodes | Byron Minns | July 15, 2012 – January 10, 2015 | Adult Swim | Williams Street | TV-14 (Note: Some episodes) | Traditional/Flash | |
| Black Dynamite | Comedy | 2 seasons, 20 episodes | Scott Sanders | July 15, 2012 – January 10, 2015 | Adult Swim | Titmouse, Inc. (season 1) | TV-14 | Traditional/Flash | |
| Black Dynamite | Comedy | 2 seasons, 20 episodes | Scott Sanders | July 15, 2012 – January 10, 2015 | Adult Swim | Trigger (season 1, season 2 opening) | TV-14 | Traditional/Flash | |
| Black Dynamite | Comedy | 2 seasons, 20 episodes | Scott Sanders | July 15, 2012 – January 10, 2015 | Adult Swim | Cartoon Network Studios (season 2) | TV-14 | Traditional/Flash | |
| Black Dynamite | Comedy | 2 seasons, 20 episodes | Scott Sanders | July 15, 2012 – January 10, 2015 | Adult Swim | N-BOMB SQUAD (season 2) | TV-14 | Traditional/Flash | |
| Black Dynamite | Comedy | 2 seasons, 20 episodes | Scott Sanders | July 15, 2012 – January 10, 2015 | Adult Swim | MOI Animation (season 2) | TV-14 | Traditional/Flash | |
| Brickleberry | Sitcom | 3 seasons, 36 episodes | Roger Black | September 25, 2012 – April 14, 2015 | Comedy Central | Damn! Show Productions | TV-MA | Flash/Traditional | |
| Brickleberry | Sitcom | 3 seasons, 36 episodes | Roger Black | September 25, 2012 – April 14, 2015 | Comedy Central | Black Heart Productions | TV-MA | Flash/Traditional | |
| Brickleberry | Sitcom | 3 seasons, 36 episodes | Waco O'Guin | September 25, 2012 – April 14, 2015 | Comedy Central | Comedy Partners | TV-MA | Flash/Traditional | |
| Brickleberry | Sitcom | 3 seasons, 36 episodes | Waco O'Guin | September 25, 2012 – April 14, 2015 | Comedy Central | Fox 21 Television Studios | TV-MA | Flash/Traditional | |
| Out There | Comedy drama | 1 season, 10 episodes | Ryan Quincy | February 22, 2013 – April 19, 2013 | IFC | Quincy Productions | TV-14 | Flash | |
| Out There | Comedy drama | 1 season, 10 episodes | Ryan Quincy | February 22, 2013 – April 19, 2013 | IFC | Bento Box Entertainment | TV-14 | Flash | |
| Out There | Comedy drama | 1 season, 10 episodes | Ryan Quincy | February 22, 2013 – April 19, 2013 | IFC | 20th Century Fox Television | TV-14 | Flash | |
| Bounty Hunters | Comedy | 1 season, 13 episodes | Matt Burnett | July 13 – September 28, 2013 | CMT | Bell Broadcast and New Media Fund | TV-14 | Flash | |
| Bounty Hunters | Comedy | 1 season, 13 episodes | Glenn Clements | July 13 – September 28, 2013 | CMT | Muse Entertainment | TV-14 | Flash | |
| Bounty Hunters | Comedy | 1 season, 13 episodes | Ben Levin | July 13 – September 28, 2013 | CMT | Parallel Entertainment | TV-14 | Flash | |
| Axe Cop | Action | 2 seasons, 22 episodes | based on the web comic series created by Ethan Nicolle and Malachai Nicolle | July 21, 2013 – June 25, 2015 | Fox (Note: Season 1) | Friends Night | TV-MA | Traditional | |
| Axe Cop | Comedy | 2 seasons, 22 episodes | based on the web comic series created by Ethan Nicolle and Malachai Nicolle | July 21, 2013 – June 25, 2015 | FXX (Note: Season 2) | ADHD Studios | TV-MA | Traditional | |
| High School USA! | Satire | 1 season, 12 episodes | Dino Stamatopoulos | July 21, 2013 – January 29, 2015 | Fox | Fragical Productions | TV-MA | Flash | |
| High School USA! | Satire | 1 season, 12 episodes | Dino Stamatopoulos | July 21, 2013 – January 29, 2015 | FXX | Friends Night | TV-MA | Flash | |
| High School USA! | Satire | 1 season, 12 episodes | Dino Stamatopoulos | July 21, 2013 – January 29, 2015 | FXX | ADHD Studios | TV-MA | Flash | |
| ADHD Shorts | Interstitial program | 1 season, 6 episodes | —N/a | July 27, 2013 – February 26, 2016 | Fox; FXX | Friends Night; ADHD Studios | TV-MA | Flash | |
| The Awesomes | Superhero | 3 seasons, 30 episodes | Seth Meyers | August 1, 2013 – November 3, 2015 | Hulu | Broadway Video | TV-14 | Flash | |
| The Awesomes | Comedy | 3 seasons, 30 episodes | Mike Shoemaker | August 1, 2013 – November 3, 2015 | Hulu | Sethmaker Shoemeyers Productions | TV-14 | Flash | |
| The Awesomes | Comedy | 3 seasons, 30 episodes | Mike Shoemaker | August 1, 2013 – November 3, 2015 | Hulu | Bento Box Entertainment | TV-14 | Flash | |
| Lucas Bros. Moving Co. | Sitcom | 2 seasons, 17 episodes | Kenny and Keith Lucas | November 23, 2013 – June 4, 2015 | Fox | Oh Snap | TV-14 | Flash | |
| Lucas Bros. Moving Co. | Sitcom | 2 seasons, 17 episodes | Kenny and Keith Lucas | November 23, 2013 – June 4, 2015 | FXX | Friends Night | TV-14 | Flash | |
| Lucas Bros. Moving Co. | Sitcom | 2 seasons, 17 episodes | Kenny and Keith Lucas | November 23, 2013 – June 4, 2015 | FXX | ADHD Studios | TV-14 | Flash | |
| Good Morning Today | Comedy | 1 season, 20 episodes | David Javerbaum | October 28, 2013 – April 7, 2014 | Fusion TV | The Jim Henson Company; ShadowMachine Films | —N/a | Stop-motion | |
| Golan the Insatiable | Comedy | 2 season, 12 episodes | Josh Miller | November 23, 2013 – July 19, 2015 | Fox | Double Hemm | TV-14 | Flash | |
| Golan the Insatiable | Fantasy | 2 season, 12 episodes | Josh Miller | November 23, 2013 – July 19, 2015 | Fox | Amazing Schlock (Season 1) | TV-14 | Flash | |
| Golan the Insatiable | Fantasy | 2 season, 12 episodes | Josh Miller | November 23, 2013 – July 19, 2015 | Fox | Friends Night | TV-14 | Flash | |
| Golan the Insatiable | Fantasy | 2 season, 12 episodes | Josh Miller | November 23, 2013 – July 19, 2015 | Fox | ADHD Studios | TV-14 | Flash | |
| Rick and Morty | Science fiction | 9 seasons, 91 episodes | Justin Roiland | December 2, 2013 – present | Adult Swim | Justin Roiland's Solo Vanity Card Productions! (seasons 1–6) | TV-14 | Flash | |
| Rick and Morty | Sitcom | 9 seasons, 91 episodes | Dan Harmon | December 2, 2013 – present | Adult Swim | Harmonious Claptrap | TV-MA (Note: Some episodes) | Flash | |
| Rick and Morty | Sitcom | 9 seasons, 91 episodes | Dan Harmon | December 2, 2013 – present | Adult Swim | Starburns Industries (seasons 1–2) | TV-MA | Flash | |
| Rick and Morty | Sitcom | 9 seasons, 91 episodes | Dan Harmon | December 2, 2013 – present | Adult Swim | Rick and Morty, LLC (season 3) | TV-MA | Flash | |
| Rick and Morty | Sitcom | 9 seasons, 91 episodes | Dan Harmon | December 2, 2013 – present | Adult Swim | Green Portal Productions (Note: season 4–present) | TV-MA | Flash | |
| Rick and Morty | Sitcom | 9 seasons, 91 episodes | Dan Harmon | December 2, 2013 – present | Adult Swim | Williams Street | TV-MA | Flash | |
| Chozen | Sitcom | 1 season, 13 episodes | Grant Dekernion | January 13, 2014 – March 31, 2014 | FX | Rough House Pictures | TV-MA | Flash | |
| Chozen | Sitcom | 1 season, 13 episodes | Grant Dekernion | January 13, 2014 – March 31, 2014 | FX | Floyd County Productions | TV-MA | Flash | |
| Chozen | Sitcom | 1 season, 13 episodes | Grant Dekernion | January 13, 2014 – March 31, 2014 | FX | FX Productions | TV-MA | Flash | |
| TripTank | Sketch comedy | 2 seasons, 28 episodes | —N/a | April 2, 2014 – August 23, 2016 | Comedy Central | ShadowMachine | TV-MA | Flash | |
| BoJack Horseman | Comedy drama | 6 seasons, 77 episodes | Raphael Bob-Waksberg | August 22, 2014 – January 31, 2020 | Netflix | The Tornante Company | TV-MA | Flash | |
| BoJack Horseman | Comedy drama | 6 seasons, 77 episodes | Raphael Bob-Waksberg | August 22, 2014 – January 31, 2020 | Netflix | Boxer vs. Raptor | TV-MA | Flash | |
| BoJack Horseman | Comedy drama | 6 seasons, 77 episodes | Raphael Bob-Waksberg | August 22, 2014 – January 31, 2020 | Netflix | ShadowMachine | TV-MA | Flash | |
| Mr. Pickles | Sitcom | 4 seasons, 31 episodes | Will Carsola | September 21, 2014 – November 17, 2019 | Adult Swim | HotHouse Productions | TV-MA | Flash | |
| Mr. Pickles | Splatter | 4 seasons, 31 episodes | Dave Stewart | September 21, 2014 – November 17, 2019 | Adult Swim | Day by Day Productions | TV-MA | Flash | |
| Mr. Pickles | Splatter | 4 seasons, 31 episodes | Dave Stewart | September 21, 2014 – November 17, 2019 | Adult Swim | Williams Street | TV-MA | Flash | |
| Stone Quackers | Comedy | 1 season, 12 episodes | Ben Jones | October 27, 2014 – July 3, 2015 | FXX | Ben Jones Studio, Inc. | TV-MA | Flash | |
| Stone Quackers | Comedy | 1 season, 12 episodes | Ben Jones | October 27, 2014 – July 3, 2015 | FXX | Friends Night | TV-MA | Flash | |
| Stone Quackers | Comedy | 1 season, 12 episodes | Ben Jones | October 27, 2014 – July 3, 2015 | FXX | ADHD Studios | TV-MA | Flash | |
| Mike Tyson Mysteries | Mystery | 4 seasons, 70 episodes | Hugh Davidson | October 27, 2014 – February 16, 2020 | Adult Swim | Warner Bros. Animation | TV-14 | Traditional | |
| Mike Tyson Mysteries | Thriller | 4 seasons, 70 episodes | Hugh Davidson | October 27, 2014 – February 16, 2020 | Adult Swim | Williams Street | TV-14 | Traditional | |
| Mike Tyson Mysteries | Comedy | 4 seasons, 70 episodes | Hugh Davidson | October 27, 2014 – February 16, 2020 | Adult Swim | Williams Street | TV-14 | Traditional | |
| The Adventures of OG Sherlock Kush | Comedy | 1 season, 20 episodes | Joseph Carnegie | 2015 – 2016 | FXX | Friends Night | —N/a | —N/a | |
| The Adventures of OG Sherlock Kush | Mystery | 1 season, 20 episodes | Joseph Carnegie | 2015 – 2016 | FXX | ADHD Studios | —N/a | —N/a | |
| Vixen | Action | 1 season, 12 episodes | Greg Berlanti | 2015 –2016 | CW Seed | Warner Bros. Animation | —N/a | —N/a | |
| Vixen | Adventure | 1 season, 12 episodes | Marc Guggenheim | 2015 –2016 | CW Seed | Blue Ribbon Content | —N/a | —N/a | |
| Vixen | Superhero | 1 season, 12 episodes | Andrew Kreisberg | 2015 –2016 | CW Seed | DC Entertainment | —N/a | —N/a | |
| Like, Share, Die | Sketch comedy | 1 season, 16 episodes | Deanna Rooney | January 29, 2015 – August 20, 2015 | Fusion TV | Mondo Media | TV-MA | Flash | |
| Major Lazer | Action | 1 season, 11 episodes | Diplo | April 16, 2015 – June 25, 2015 | FXX | Mad Decent | TV-MA | Traditional | |
| Major Lazer | Science fiction | 1 season, 11 episodes | Ferry Gouw | April 16, 2015 – June 25, 2015 | FXX | Friends Night | TV-MA | Traditional | |
| Major Lazer | Science fiction | 1 season, 11 episodes | Kevin Kusatsu | April 16, 2015 – June 25, 2015 | FXX | ADHD Studios | TV-MA | Traditional | |
| Moonbeam City | Comedy | 1 season, 10 episodes | Scott Gairdner | September 16, 2015 – December 9, 2015 | Comedy Central | Olive Bridge Entertainment | TV-14 | Flash | |
| Moonbeam City | Comedy | 1 season, 10 episodes | Scott Gairdner | September 16, 2015 – December 9, 2015 | Comedy Central | Alphapanel Industries | TV-14 | Flash | |
| Moonbeam City | Comedy | 1 season, 10 episodes | Scott Gairdner | September 16, 2015 – December 9, 2015 | Comedy Central | Solis Animation | TV-14 | Flash | |
| Moonbeam City | Comedy | 1 season, 10 episodes | Scott Gairdner | September 16, 2015 – December 9, 2015 | Comedy Central | Titmouse, Inc. | TV-14 | Flash | |
| SuperMansion | Superhero | 3 seasons, 41 episodes | Matthew Senreich | October 8, 2015 – May 9, 2019 | Crackle | Stoopid Monkey | TV-14 | Stop-motion | |
| SuperMansion | Sitcom | 3 seasons, 41 episodes | Zeb Wells | October 8, 2015 – May 9, 2019 | Crackle | Stoopid Buddy Stoodios | TV-14 | TV-MA (one episode) | |
| SuperMansion | Sitcom | 3 seasons, 41 episodes | Zeb Wells | October 8, 2015 – May 9, 2019 | Crackle | Moon Shot Entertainment | TV-14 | TV-MA (one episode) | |
| F Is for Family | Sitcom | 4 seasons, 36 episodes | Bill Burr | December 18, 2015 – November 25, 2021 | Netflix | Wild West Television | TV-MA | Flash/Traditional | |
| F Is for Family | Comedy drama | 4 seasons, 36 episodes | Michael Price | December 18, 2015 – November 25, 2021 | Netflix | Loner Productions | TV-MA | Flash/Traditional | |
| F Is for Family | Comedy drama | 4 seasons, 36 episodes | Michael Price | December 18, 2015 – November 25, 2021 | Netflix | King of France Productions | TV-MA | Flash/Traditional | |
| F Is for Family | Comedy drama | 4 seasons, 36 episodes | Michael Price | December 18, 2015 – November 25, 2021 | Netflix | Gaumont International Television | TV-MA | Flash/Traditional | |
| F Is for Family | Comedy drama | 4 seasons, 36 episodes | Michael Price | December 18, 2015 – November 25, 2021 | Netflix | Gaumont Animation | TV-MA | Flash/Traditional | |
| F Is for Family | Comedy drama | 4 seasons, 36 episodes | Michael Price | December 18, 2015 – November 25, 2021 | Netflix | Telegael Teoranta | TV-MA | Flash/Traditional | |
| Bordertown | Sitcom | 1 season, 13 episodes | Mark Hentemann | January 3, 2016 – May 22, 2016 | Fox | Hentemann Films | TV-14 | Traditional | |
| Bordertown | Sitcom | 1 season, 13 episodes | Mark Hentemann | January 3, 2016 – May 22, 2016 | Fox | Fuzzy Door Productions | TV-14 | Traditional | |
| Bordertown | Sitcom | 1 season, 13 episodes | Mark Hentemann | January 3, 2016 – May 22, 2016 | Fox | Bento Box Entertainment | TV-14 | Traditional | |
| Bordertown | Sitcom | 1 season, 13 episodes | Mark Hentemann | January 3, 2016 – May 22, 2016 | Fox | 20th Century Fox Television | TV-14 | Traditional | |
| Greatest Party Story Ever | Comedy | 2 seasons, 20 episodes | —N/a | January 14, 2016 – December 22, 2016 | MTV | Four Peaks Media Group | TV-14 | Flash | |
| Greatest Party Story Ever | Comedy | 2 seasons, 20 episodes | —N/a | January 14, 2016 – December 22, 2016 | MTV | Den of Thieves | TV-14 | Flash | |
| Greatest Party Story Ever | Comedy | 2 seasons, 20 episodes | —N/a | January 14, 2016 – December 22, 2016 | MTV | ShadowMachine | TV-14 | Flash | |
| Animals | Comedy | 3 seasons, 30 episodes | Phil Matarese | February 5, 2016 – October 5, 2018 | HBO | Karen BBQ | TV-MA | Flash/Traditional | |
| Animals | Comedy | 3 seasons, 30 episodes | Mike Luciano | February 5, 2016 – October 5, 2018 | HBO | Duplass Brothers Television | TV-MA | Flash/Traditional | |
| Animals | Comedy | 3 seasons, 30 episodes | Mike Luciano | February 5, 2016 – October 5, 2018 | HBO | Starburns Industries | TV-MA | Flash/Traditional | |
| Party Legends | Documental | 1 season, 14 episodes | —N/a | July 7, 2016 – July 27, 2017 | Viceland | Field Recordings | TV-MA | Flash | |
| Brad Neely's Harg Nallin' Sclopio Peepio | Sketch comedy | 1 season, 10 episodes | Brad Neely | July 10, 2016 – September 18, 2016 | Adult Swim | Neely Comics | TV-14 | Flash | |
| Brad Neely's Harg Nallin' Sclopio Peepio | Sketch comedy | 1 season, 10 episodes | Brad Neely | July 10, 2016 – September 18, 2016 | Adult Swim | Working for Monsters | TV-14 | Flash | |
| Brad Neely's Harg Nallin' Sclopio Peepio | Sketch comedy | 1 season, 10 episodes | Brad Neely | July 10, 2016 – September 18, 2016 | Adult Swim | Titmouse, Inc. | TV-14 | Flash | |
| Brad Neely's Harg Nallin' Sclopio Peepio | Sketch comedy | 1 season, 10 episodes | Brad Neely | July 10, 2016 – September 18, 2016 | Adult Swim | Williams Street | TV-14 | Flash | |
| Son of Zorn | Sitcom; Live action/animation | 1 season, 13 episodes | Reed Agnew; Eli Jorné | September 11, 2016 – February 19, 2017 | Fox | Lord Miller Productions; 20th Television | TV-14 | Live-action/Flash | |
| Legends of Chamberlain Heights | Sitcom | 2 seasons, 20 episodes | Brad Ableson | September 14, 2016 – August 20, 2017 | Comedy Central | Bento Box Entertainment | TV-MA | Flash/Traditional | |
| Legends of Chamberlain Heights | Sitcom | 2 seasons, 20 episodes | Quinn Hawking | September 14, 2016 – August 20, 2017 | Comedy Central | Bento Box Entertainment | TV-MA | Flash/Traditional | |
| Legends of Chamberlain Heights | Sitcom | 2 seasons, 20 episodes | Josiah Johnson | September 14, 2016 – August 20, 2017 | Comedy Central | Bento Box Entertainment | TV-MA | Flash/Traditional | |
| Legends of Chamberlain Heights | Sitcom | 2 seasons, 20 episodes | Michael Starrbury | September 14, 2016 – August 20, 2017 | Comedy Central | Bento Box Entertainment | TV-MA | Flash/Traditional | |
| Dream Corp, LLC | Black comedy | 3 seasons, 28 episodes | Daniel Stessen | October 23, 2016 – November 22, 2020 | Adult Swim | Caviar Content | TV-14 | Live-Action/Rotoscoping | |
| Dream Corp, LLC | Black comedy | 3 seasons, 28 episodes | Daniel Stessen | October 23, 2016 – November 22, 2020 | Adult Swim | Alive and Kicking, Inc. | TV-14 | Live-Action/Rotoscoping | |
| Dream Corp, LLC | Black comedy | 3 seasons, 28 episodes | Daniel Stessen | October 23, 2016 – November 22, 2020 | Adult Swim | BEMO | TV-14 | Live-Action/Rotoscoping | |
| Dream Corp, LLC | Black comedy | 3 seasons, 28 episodes | Daniel Stessen | October 23, 2016 – November 22, 2020 | Adult Swim | Williams Street | TV-14 | Live-Action/Rotoscoping | |
| Paranormal Action Squad | Comedy | 1 season, 8 episodes | Adam Montoya | November 16, 2016 – December 28, 2016 | YouTube Red | Pickaxe Productions | TV-14 | Flash | |
| Paranormal Action Squad | Comedy | 1 season, 8 episodes | Hank Stepleton | November 16, 2016 – December 28, 2016 | YouTube Red | Octopie Studios | TV-14 | Flash | |
| Paranormal Action Squad | Comedy | 1 season, 8 episodes | Michael Rowe | November 16, 2016 – December 28, 2016 | YouTube Red | J and N Productions (Episode 1) | TV-14 | Flash | |
| Paranormal Action Squad | Comedy | 1 season, 8 episodes | Michael Rowe | November 16, 2016 – December 28, 2016 | YouTube Red | 3BlackDot | TV-14 | Flash | |
| Jeff & Some Aliens | Sitcom | 1 season, 10 episodes | Sean Donnelly | January 11, 2017 – March 15, 2017 | Comedy Central | ShadowMachine | TV-MA | Traditional/Flash | |
| Jeff & Some Aliens | Sitcom | 1 season, 10 episodes | Alessandro Minoli | January 11, 2017 – March 15, 2017 | Comedy Central | ShadowMachine | TV-MA | Traditional/Flash | |
| Samurai Jack (Note: Season 5) | Action-Adventure | 10 episodes (Note: in Season 5) | Genndy Tartakovsky | March 11, 2017 – May 20, 2017 | Cartoon Network | Williams Street | TV-14 (Note: season 5) | Traditional | |
| Samurai Jack | Action-Adventure | 10 episodes | Genndy Tartakovsky | March 11, 2017 – May 20, 2017 | Adult Swim | Williams Street | TV-PG (Note: some episodes) | Traditional | |
| Imaginary Mary | Sitcom; Live action/animation | 1 season, 9 episodes | Adam F. Goldberg; David Guarascio; Patrick Osborne | March 29, 2017 - May 30, 2017 | ABC | David Guarascio Productions; Adam F. Goldberg Productions; Happy Madison Productions; ABC Studios; Sony Pictures Television | TV-PG | Live-action/CGI | |
| Castlevania | Drama | 3 seasons, 22 episodes | Adi Shankar | July 7, 2017 – May 13, 2021 | Netflix | Frederator Studios | TV-MA | Traditional | |
| Castlevania | Dark fantasy | 3 seasons, 22 episodes | Adi Shankar | July 7, 2017 – May 13, 2021 | Netflix | Powerhouse Animation Studios | TV-MA | Traditional | |
| Castlevania | Dark fantasy | 3 seasons, 22 episodes | Adi Shankar | July 7, 2017 – May 13, 2021 | Netflix | Shankar Animation | TV-MA | Traditional | |
| Castlevania | Dark fantasy | 3 seasons, 22 episodes | Adi Shankar | July 7, 2017 – May 13, 2021 | Netflix | Project 51 Productions | TV-MA | Traditional | |
| Castlevania | Dark fantasy | 3 seasons, 22 episodes | Adi Shankar | July 7, 2017 – May 13, 2021 | Netflix | Mua Film | TV-MA | Traditional | |
| Apollo Gauntlet | Adventure | 1 season, 6 episodes | Myles Langlois | July 9, 2017 – August 13, 2017 | Adult Swim | 6 Point Harness | TV-14 | Flash | |
| Apollo Gauntlet | Adventure | 1 season, 6 episodes | Myles Langlois | July 9, 2017 – August 13, 2017 | Adult Swim | Mosaic | TV-14 | Flash | |
| Apollo Gauntlet | Adventure | 1 season, 6 episodes | Myles Langlois | July 9, 2017 – August 13, 2017 | Adult Swim | Williams Street | TV-14 | Flash | |
| Neo Yokio | Satire | 1 season, 7 episodes | Ezra Koenig | September 22, 2017 – December 7, 2018 | Netflix | Production IG | TV-MA | Traditional | |
| Neo Yokio | Fantasy | 1 season, 7 episodes | Ezra Koenig | September 22, 2017 – December 7, 2018 | Netflix | Studio Deen | TV-MA | Traditional | |
| Neo Yokio | Fantasy | 1 season, 7 episodes | Ezra Koenig | September 22, 2017 – December 7, 2018 | Netflix | Friends Night | TV-MA | Traditional | |
| Neo Yokio | Fantasy | 1 season, 7 episodes | Ezra Koenig | September 22, 2017 – December 7, 2018 | Netflix | MOI Animation | TV-MA | Traditional | |
| Neo Yokio | Fantasy | 1 season, 7 episodes | Ezra Koenig | September 22, 2017 – December 7, 2018 | Netflix | Infinite Elegance, LLC | TV-MA | Traditional | |
| Neo Yokio | Fantasy | 1 season, 7 episodes | Ezra Koenig | September 22, 2017 – December 7, 2018 | Netflix | Titmouse, Inc. | TV-MA | Traditional | |
| Neo Yokio | Fantasy | 1 season, 7 episodes | Ezra Koenig | September 22, 2017 – December 7, 2018 | Netflix | Digital eMation, Inc. | TV-MA | Traditional | |
| Mike Judge Presents: Tales from the Tour Bus | Documentary | 2 seasons, 16 episodes | Mike Judge | September 22, 2017 – December 21, 2018 | Cinemax | Judgemental Films Inc. | TV-MA | Traditional | |
| Mike Judge Presents: Tales from the Tour Bus | Comedy | 2 seasons, 16 episodes | Richard Mullins | September 22, 2017 – December 21, 2018 | Cinemax | Zipper Bros Films | TV-MA | Traditional | |
| Mike Judge Presents: Tales from the Tour Bus | Comedy | 2 seasons, 16 episodes | Dub Cornett | September 22, 2017 – December 21, 2018 | Cinemax | Sutter Road Picture Company | TV-MA | Traditional | |
| Mike Judge Presents: Tales from the Tour Bus | Comedy | 2 seasons, 16 episodes | Dub Cornett | September 22, 2017 – December 21, 2018 | Cinemax | Diamond Docs | TV-MA | Traditional | |
| Big Mouth | Sitcom | 8 seasons, 81 episodes | Nick Kroll | September 29, 2017 – May 23, 2025 | Netflix | Danger Goldberg Productions | TV-MA | Flash/Traditional | |
| Big Mouth | Sitcom | 8 seasons, 81 episodes | Andrew Goldberg | September 29, 2017 – May 23, 2025 | Netflix | Good at Bizness, Inc. | TV-MA | Flash/Traditional | |
| Big Mouth | Sitcom | 8 seasons, 81 episodes | Mark Levin | September 29, 2017 – May 23, 2025 | Netflix | Fathouse Industries | TV-MA | Flash/Traditional | |
| Big Mouth | Sitcom | 8 seasons, 81 episodes | Jennifer Flackett | September 29, 2017 – May 23, 2025 | Netflix | Titmouse, Inc. | TV-MA | Flash/Traditional | |
| The Jellies! | Sitcom | 2 season, 20 episodes | Tyler Okonma | October 22, 2017 – June 23, 2019 | Adult Swim | Bald Fade Productions | TV-MA | Flash | |
| The Jellies! | Sitcom | 2 season, 20 episodes | Tyler Okonma | October 22, 2017 – June 23, 2019 | Adult Swim | Augenblick Studios | TV-MA | Flash | |
| The Jellies! | Sitcom | 2 season, 20 episodes | Tyler Okonma | October 22, 2017 – June 23, 2019 | Adult Swim | Whalerock Industries | TV-MA | Flash | |
| The Jellies! | Sitcom | 2 season, 20 episodes | Tyler Okonma | October 22, 2017 – June 23, 2019 | Adult Swim | Williams Street | TV-MA | Flash | |
| Tarantula | Sitcom | 1 season, 10 episodes | Carson Mell | December 4, 2017 – December 25, 2017 | TBS | Rough Draft Studios | TV-MA | Traditional | |
| Tarantula | Sitcom | 1 season, 10 episodes | Carson Mell | December 4, 2017 – December 25, 2017 | TBS | Rough House Pictures | TV-MA | Traditional | |
| Tarantula | Sitcom | 1 season, 10 episodes | Carson Mell | December 4, 2017 – December 25, 2017 | TBS | Solid Brass | TV-MA | Traditional | |
| Tarantula | Sitcom | 1 season, 10 episodes | Carson Mell | December 4, 2017 – December 25, 2017 | TBS | Studio T | TV-MA | Traditional | |
| Happy! | Action; Black Comedy; Crime; Fantasy Drama; Thriller | 2 seasons, 18 episodes | Grant Morrison; Darick Robertson | December 6, 2017 - May 29, 2019 | Syfy | Hypernormal (season 2); Original Film; Littleton Road; Universal Content Productions | TV-MA | Live-action/CGI | |
| Freedom Fighters: The Ray | Action, Adventure, Science fiction, Superhero | 2 seasons, 12 episodes | Greg Berlanti | December 8, 2017 – July 18, 2018 | CW Seed | Warner Bros. Animation | —N/a | —N/a | |
| Freedom Fighters: The Ray | Action, Adventure, Science fiction, Superhero | 2 seasons, 12 episodes | Marc Guggenheim | December 8, 2017 – July 18, 2018 | CW Seed | Blue Ribbon Content | —N/a | —N/a | |
| Freedom Fighters: The Ray | Action, Adventure, Science fiction, Superhero | 2 seasons, 12 episodes | Marc Guggenheim | December 8, 2017 – July 18, 2018 | CW Seed | DC Entertainment | —N/a | —N/a | |
| Tender Touches | Soap opera | 3 seasons, 15 episodes | David Bonawits | December 19, 2017 – June 19, 2020 | Adult Swim | Williams Street | TV-14 | Traditional | |
| Tender Touches | Parody | 3 seasons, 15 episodes | Lauren Payne | December 19, 2017 – June 19, 2020 | Adult Swim | 6 Point Harness (season 2) | TV-14 | Traditional | |
| Tender Touches | Parody | 3 seasons, 15 episodes | Maxime Simonet | December 19, 2017 – June 19, 2020 | Adult Swim | Awesome, Inc. (season 3) | TV-14 | Traditional | |
| Hot Streets | Action | 2 seasons, 20 episodes | Brian Wysol | January 14, 2018 – March 24, 2019 | Adult Swim | Stoopid Buddy Stoodios | TV-14 | Flash/Traditional | |
| Hot Streets | Comedy | 2 seasons, 20 episodes | Brian Wysol | January 14, 2018 – March 24, 2019 | Adult Swim | Williams Street | TV-14 | Flash/Traditional | |
| Hot Streets | Comedy | 2 seasons, 20 episodes | Brian Wysol | January 14, 2018 – March 24, 2019 | Adult Swim | Justin Roiland's Solo Vanity Card Productions! | TV-14 | Flash/Traditional | |
| Our Cartoon President | Satire | 3 seasons, 46 episodes | Stephen Colbert | February 11, 2018 – November 8, 2020 | Showtime | Spartina | TV-14 | Flash | |
| Our Cartoon President | Satire | 3 seasons, 46 episodes | Chris Licht | February 11, 2018 – November 8, 2020 | Showtime | Licht Media Solutions | TV-14 | Flash | |
| Our Cartoon President | Satire | 3 seasons, 46 episodes | Matt Lappin | February 11, 2018 – November 8, 2020 | Showtime | Late Night Cartoons, Inc. | TV-14 | Flash | |
| Our Cartoon President | Satire | 3 seasons, 46 episodes | Tim Luecke | February 11, 2018 – November 8, 2020 | Showtime | CBS Television Studios | TV-14 | Flash | |
| Our Cartoon President | Satire | 3 seasons, 46 episodes | R.J. Fried | February 11, 2018 – November 8, 2020 | Showtime | Showtime Networks | TV-14 | Flash | |
| Dallas & Robo | Comedy | 1 season, 8 episodes | Mike Roberts | May 30, 2018 | YouTube Red | ShadowMachine | TV-14 | Flash | |
| Human Kind Of | Comedy | 1 season, 21 episodes | Diana McCorry | September 16, 2018 – October 28, 2018 | Facebook Watch | Cartuna | —N/a | —N/a | |
| Liverspots and Astronots | Comedy | 1 season, 21 episodes | Rob Bohn | October 18, 2018 – November 29, 2018 | Facebook Watch | Cartuna | —N/a | —N/a | |
| Liverspots and Astronots | Comedy | 1 season, 21 episodes | Nate Milton | October 18, 2018 – November 29, 2018 | Facebook Watch | Cartuna | —N/a | —N/a | |
| Constantine: City of Demons | Horror | 1 season, 5 episodes | Greg Berlanti | 2018 – present | CW Seed | Warner Bros. Animation | —N/a | —N/a | |
| Constantine: City of Demons | Horror | 1 season, 5 episodes | Blue Ribbon Content | 2018 – present | CW Seed | David S. Goyer | —N/a | —N/a | |
| Constantine: City of Demons | Horror | 1 season, 5 episodes | DC Entertainment | 2018 – present | CW Seed | David S. Goyer | —N/a | —N/a | |
| Final Space | Space opera | 3 seasons, 36 episodes | Olan Rogers | February 26, 2018 – June 14, 2021 | TBS (Season 1) | Conaco | TV-14 | Toon Boom Harmony | |
| Final Space | Comedy drama | 3 seasons, 36 episodes | Olan Rogers | February 26, 2018 – June 14, 2021 | Adult Swim (Seasons 2–3) | Studio T (season 1) | TV-14 | Toon Boom Harmony | |
| Final Space | Comedy drama | 3 seasons, 36 episodes | Olan Rogers | February 26, 2018 – June 14, 2021 | Adult Swim (Seasons 2–3) | New Form Digital | TV-14 | Toon Boom Harmony | |
| Final Space | Comedy drama | 3 seasons, 36 episodes | Olan Rogers | February 26, 2018 – June 14, 2021 | Adult Swim (Seasons 2–3) | ShadowMachine | TV-14 | Toon Boom Harmony | |
| Final Space | Comedy drama | 3 seasons, 36 episodes | Olan Rogers | February 26, 2018 – June 14, 2021 | Adult Swim (Seasons 2–3) | Jam Filled Ottawa | TV-14 | Toon Boom Harmony | |
| Ballmastrz: 9009 | Science fiction comedy | 2 seasons, 21 episodes | Christy Karacas | April 9, 2018 – February 20, 2023 | Adult Swim | Titmouse, Inc. (seasons 1–2) | TV-14 | Flash | |
| Ballmastrz: 9009 | Science fiction comedy | 2 seasons, 21 episodes | Christy Karacas | April 9, 2018 – February 20, 2023 | Adult Swim | PFFR (special) | TV-14 | Flash | |
| Ballmastrz: 9009 | Science fiction comedy | 2 seasons, 21 episodes | Christy Karacas | April 9, 2018 – February 20, 2023 | Adult Swim | C.C.K. Rad (season 2-present) | TV-14 | Flash | |
| Ballmastrz: 9009 | Science fiction comedy | 2 seasons, 21 episodes | Christy Karacas | April 9, 2018 – February 20, 2023 | Adult Swim | Studio 4°C (special) | TV-MA (one episode) | Flash | |
| Ballmastrz: 9009 | Science fiction comedy | 2 seasons, 21 episodes | Christy Karacas | April 9, 2018 – February 20, 2023 | Adult Swim | Williams Street | TV-MA (one episode) | Flash | |
| Disenchantment | Sitcom | 3 seasons, 50 episodes | Matt Groening | August 17, 2018 – September 1, 2023 | Netflix | The ULULU Company | TV-14 | Traditional | |
| Disenchantment | Medieval fantasy | 3 seasons, 50 episodes | Matt Groening | August 17, 2018 – September 1, 2023 | Netflix | Rough Draft Studios | TV-14 | Traditional | |
| Paradise PD | Sitcom | 2 seasons, 30 episodes | Waco O'Guin | August 31, 2018 – December 16, 2022 | Netflix | Damn! Show Productions | TV-MA | Flash/Traditional | |
| Paradise PD | Sitcom | 2 seasons, 30 episodes | Roger Black | August 31, 2018 – December 16, 2022 | Netflix | Odenkirk Provissiero Entertainment | TV-MA | Flash/Traditional | |
| Paradise PD | Sitcom | 2 seasons, 30 episodes | Roger Black | August 31, 2018 – December 16, 2022 | Netflix | Bento Box Entertainment | TV-MA | Flash/Traditional | |
| The Shivering Truth | Anthology | 2 season, 12 episodes | Vernon Chatman | December 9, 2018 – June 14, 2020 | Adult Swim | ShadowMachine (season 1) | TV-MA | Stop-motion | |
| The Shivering Truth | Anthology | 2 season, 12 episodes | Vernon Chatman | December 9, 2018 – June 14, 2020 | Adult Swim | HouseSpecial (season 2) | TV-MA | Stop-motion | |
| The Shivering Truth | Sketch comedy | 2 season, 12 episodes | Vernon Chatman | December 9, 2018 – June 14, 2020 | Adult Swim | PFFR | TV-14 (one episode) | Stop-motion | |
| The Shivering Truth | Sketch comedy | 2 season, 12 episodes | Vernon Chatman | December 9, 2018 – June 14, 2020 | Adult Swim | Williams Street | TV-14 (one episode) | Stop-motion | |
| Fundamentally Cynical | Science fiction | 2 seasons, 13 episodes | Preston Hazard | January 1, 2019 – present | Prime Video | Pow Animation Studio | TV-14 | CGI | |
| Tigtone | Action-Adventure | 2 seasons, 20 episodes | Andrew Koehler | January 14, 2019 – October 12, 2020 | Adult Swim | Babyhemyth Productions | TV-14 | Flash | |
| Tigtone | Action-Adventure | 2 seasons, 20 episodes | Benjamin Martin | January 14, 2019 – October 12, 2020 | Adult Swim | Titmouse, Inc. | TV-14 | Flash | |
| Tigtone | Action-Adventure | 2 seasons, 20 episodes | Benjamin Martin | January 14, 2019 – October 12, 2020 | Adult Swim | Williams Street | TV-14 | Flash | |
| Alien News Desk | Comedy | 1 season, 12 episodes | Chris Prynoski | February 27, 2019 – May 4, 2019 | Syfy | Bento Box Entertainment | TV-MA | Flash/Traditional | |
| Alien News Desk | Comedy | 1 season, 12 episodes | Austin Reading | February 27, 2019 – May 4, 2019 | Syfy | Broadway Video | TV-MA | Flash/Traditional | |
| Love, Death & Robots | Anthology | 2 season, 26 episodes | Tim Miller | March 15, 2019 – present | Netflix | Blur Studio | TV-MA | Flash | |
| Love, Death & Robots | Science fiction | 2 season, 26 episodes | Tim Miller | March 15, 2019 – present | Netflix | Netflix Studios | TV-MA | CGI | |
| Love, Death & Robots | Science fiction | 2 season, 26 episodes | Tim Miller | March 15, 2019 – present | Netflix | Netflix Studios | TV-MA | Traditional | |
| Love, Death & Robots | Science fiction | 2 season, 26 episodes | Tim Miller | March 15, 2019 – present | Netflix | Netflix Studios | TV-MA | Live-action | |
| Gēmusetto | Educational | 1 season, 6 episodes | Max Simonet | April 1, 2019 | Adult Swim | Awesome Inc | TV-MA | Flash | |
| Gēmusetto | Parody | 1 season, 6 episodes | Max Simonet | April 1, 2019 | Adult Swim | Williams Street | TV-14 (one episode) | Flash | |
| Lazor Wulf | Comedy | 2 seasons, 20 episodes | Henry Bonsu | April 7, 2019 – January 11, 2021 | Adult Swim | Bento Box Entertainment | TV-14 | Toon Boom Harmony (season 1) | |
| Lazor Wulf | Comedy | 2 seasons, 20 episodes | Henry Bonsu | April 7, 2019 – January 11, 2021 | Adult Swim | Williams Street | TV-14 | Flash (season 2) | |
| Tuca & Bertie | Sitcom | 2 seasons, 30 episodes | Lisa Hanawalt | May 3, 2019 – August 29, 2022 | Netflix (season 1) | The Tornante Company | TV-MA (Season 1 only) | Flash | |
| Tuca & Bertie | Surreal humor | 2 seasons, 30 episodes | Lisa Hanawalt | May 3, 2019 – August 29, 2022 | Netflix (season 1) | Brave Dummy | TV-MA (Season 1 only) | Flash | |
| Tuca & Bertie | Surreal humor | 2 seasons, 30 episodes | Lisa Hanawalt | May 3, 2019 – August 29, 2022 | Netflix (season 1) | ShadowMachine | TV-MA (Season 1 only) | Flash | |
| Tuca & Bertie | Surreal humor | 2 seasons, 30 episodes | Lisa Hanawalt | May 3, 2019 – August 29, 2022 | Netflix (season 1) | Boxer vs. Raptor (season 1) | TV-MA (Season 1 only) | Flash | |
| Tuca & Bertie | Surreal humor | 2 seasons, 30 episodes | Lisa Hanawalt | May 3, 2019 – August 29, 2022 | Adult Swim (seasons 2–3) | Vegan Blitzes (seasons 2–3) | TV-14 (seasons 2–3) | Flash | |
| Tuca & Bertie | Surreal humor | 2 seasons, 30 episodes | Lisa Hanawalt | May 3, 2019 – August 29, 2022 | Adult Swim (seasons 2–3) | Williams Street (seasons 2–3) | TV-14 (seasons 2–3) | Flash | |
| Hell Den | Sketch comedy | 2 seasons, 12 episodes | Sean Cowhig | May 10, 2019 – December 12, 2020 | DrinkTV | Dr. God Productions | TV-MA | Flash | |
| Hell Den | Sketch comedy | 2 seasons, 12 episodes | Neil Garguilo | May 10, 2019 – December 12, 2020 | Syfy | Rafael Raffaele Entertainment | TV-MA | Flash | |
| Hell Den | Sketch comedy | 2 seasons, 12 episodes | Brian James O'Connell | May 10, 2019 – December 12, 2020 | Syfy | Shout! Studios | TV-MA | Flash | |
| Hell Den | Sketch comedy | 2 seasons, 12 episodes | David F. Park | May 10, 2019 – December 12, 2020 | Syfy | TZGZ Productions (season 2) | TV-MA | Flash | |
| Hell Den | Sketch comedy | 2 seasons, 12 episodes | Justin Ware | May 10, 2019 – December 12, 2020 | Syfy | TZGZ Productions (season 2) | TV-MA | Flash | |
| Sugar and Toys | Talk show | 2 seasons, 11 episodes | Brian Ash | June 9, 2019 – October 25, 2020 | Fuse | This is Just a Test | TV-MA | Flash | |
| Sugar and Toys | Talk show | 2 seasons, 11 episodes | Carl Jones | June 9, 2019 – October 25, 2020 | Fuse | 245 Enterprises | TV-MA | Live-action | |
| Human Discoveries | Drama | 1 season, 10 episodes | Chris Bruno; David Howard Lee | July 16 – September 3, 2019 | Facebook Watch | ShadowMachine | TV-MA | Flash | |
| Undone | Comedy drama | 1 season, 8 episodes | Raphael Bob-Waksberg | September 13, 2019 – April 29, 2022 | Amazon Prime Video | The Tornante Company | TV-MA | Rotoscoping | |
| Undone | Comedy drama | 1 season, 8 episodes | Kate Purdy | September 13, 2019 – April 29, 2022 | Amazon Prime Video | Boxer vs. Raptor | TV-MA | Rotoscoping | |
| Undone | Comedy drama | 1 season, 8 episodes | Kate Purdy | September 13, 2019 – April 29, 2022 | Amazon Prime Video | Submarine Amsterdam | TV-MA | Rotoscoping | |
| Undone | Comedy drama | 1 season, 8 episodes | Kate Purdy | September 13, 2019 – April 29, 2022 | Amazon Prime Video | Hive House Project | TV-MA | Rotoscoping | |
| Cake | Anthology | 5 seasons, 47 episodes | —N/a | September 25, 2019 – December 9, 2021 | FXX | SLAQR | TV-MA | Flash/live-action | |
| Cake | Anthology | 5 seasons, 47 episodes | —N/a | September 25, 2019 – December 9, 2021 | FXX | FXP | TV-MA | Flash/live-action | |
| Bless the Harts | Sitcom | 2 seasons, 32 episodes | Emily Spivey | September 29, 2019 – June 20, 2021 | Fox | Titmouse, Inc. | TV-14 | Flash | |
| Bless the Harts | Sitcom | 2 seasons, 32 episodes | Emily Spivey | September 29, 2019 – June 20, 2021 | Fox | Jessebean, Inc. | TV-14 | Flash | |
| Bless the Harts | Sitcom | 2 seasons, 32 episodes | Emily Spivey | September 29, 2019 – June 20, 2021 | Fox | Lord Miller Productions | TV-14 | Flash | |
| Bless the Harts | Sitcom | 2 seasons, 32 episodes | Emily Spivey | September 29, 2019 – June 20, 2021 | Fox | Fox Entertainment | TV-14 | Flash | |
| Bless the Harts | Sitcom | 2 seasons, 32 episodes | Emily Spivey | September 29, 2019 – June 20, 2021 | Fox | 20th Television | TV-14 | Flash | |
| Seis Manos | Action | 1 season, 8 episodes | Brad Graeber | October 3, 2019 | Netflix | Powerhouse Animation Studios | TV-MA | Traditional | |
| Seis Manos | Supernatural fiction | 1 season, 8 episodes | Álvaro Rodríguez | October 3, 2019 | Netflix | Viz Productions | TV-MA | Traditional | |
| Primal | Action-Adventure | 1 season, 10 episodes | Genndy Tartakovsky | October 7, 2019 – present | Adult Swim | Cartoon Network Studios | TV-14 | Traditional | |
| Primal | Action-Adventure | 1 season, 10 episodes | Genndy Tartakovsky | October 7, 2019 – present | Adult Swim | Williams Street | TV-MA (three episodes) | Traditional | |
| You're Not a Monster | Horror-comedy | 1 season, 10 episodes | Frank Lesser | October 10, 2019 | IMDb TV | Grammnet Productions | —N/a | Flash | |
| You're Not a Monster | Horror-comedy | 1 season, 10 episodes | Frank Lesser | October 10, 2019 | IMDb TV | Bold Soul Studios | —N/a | Flash | |
| You're Not a Monster | Horror-comedy | 1 season, 10 episodes | Frank Lesser | October 10, 2019 | IMDb TV | Ranker | —N/a | Flash | |
| Momma Named Me Sheriff | Sitcom | 2 season, 19 episodes | Will Carsola | November 18, 2019 – March 15, 2021 | Adult Swim | HotHouse Productions | TV-MA | Flash | |
| Momma Named Me Sheriff | Dark comedy | 2 season, 19 episodes | Dave Stewart | November 18, 2019 – March 15, 2021 | Adult Swim | Day by Day Productions | TV-MA | Flash | |
| Momma Named Me Sheriff | Dark comedy | 2 season, 19 episodes | Dave Stewart | November 18, 2019 – March 15, 2021 | Adult Swim | Williams Street | TV-MA | Flash | |
| Harley Quinn | Black comedy | 4 seasons, 47 episodes | Justin Halpern | November 29, 2019 – present | DC Universe (Seasons 1–2) | DC Entertainment | TV-MA | Traditional | |
| Harley Quinn | Black comedy | 4 seasons, 47 episodes | Patrick Schumacker | November 29, 2019 – present | DC Universe (Seasons 1–2) | Warner Bros. Animation | TV-MA | Traditional | |
| Harley Quinn | Black comedy | 4 seasons, 47 episodes | Patrick Schumacker | November 29, 2019 – present | DC Universe (Seasons 1–2) | Yes, Norman Productions | TV-MA | Traditional | |
| Harley Quinn | Black comedy | 4 seasons, 47 episodes | Patrick Schumacker | November 29, 2019 – present | DC Universe (Seasons 1–2) | Ehsugadee Productions (seasons 1–2) | TV-MA | Traditional | |
| Harley Quinn | Black comedy | 4 seasons, 47 episodes | Dean Lorey | November 29, 2019 – present | HBO Max (season 3-present) | Delicious Non-Sequitur (season 3-present) | TV-MA | Traditional | |

=== United Kingdom ===
| Title | Genre | Seasons/episodes | Show creator(s) | Original release | Network | Studio | Source |
|---|---|---|---|---|---|---|---|
| Full English | Sitcom | 1 season, 6 episodes | Jack Williams Harry Williams Alex Scarfe | November 12, 2012 – December 17, 2012 | Channel 4 | Two Brothers Pictures Rough Draft Studios | |
| Full English | Satire | 1 season, 6 episodes | Jack Williams Harry Williams Alex Scarfe | November 12, 2012 – December 17, 2012 | Channel 4 | Two Brothers Pictures Rough Draft Studios | |
| Warren United | Comedy | 1 season, 6 episodes | Bill Freedman | April 22, 2014 – May 27, 2014 | ITV4 | Baby Cow Productions | |

=== Canada ===
| Title | Genre | Seasons/episodes | Show creator(s) | Original release | Network | Studio | Source |
|---|---|---|---|---|---|---|---|
| The Dating Guy | Sitcom | 2 seasons, 26 episodes | Matt Hornburg | October 17, 2010 – May 8, 2011 | Teletoon at Night | marblemedia | |
| The Dating Guy | Sitcom | 2 seasons, 26 episodes | Mark Bishop | October 17, 2010 – May 8, 2011 | Teletoon at Night | Entertainment One | |
| Crash Canyon | Sitcom | 2 seasons, 26 episodes | Jamie LeClaire | September 18, 2011 – March 3, 2013 | Teletoon at Night | Breakthrough Entertainment | |
| Crash Canyon | Sitcom | 2 seasons, 26 episodes | Phil Lafrance | September 18, 2011 – March 3, 2013 | Teletoon at Night | Breakthrough Entertainment | |
| Crash Canyon | Sitcom | 2 seasons, 26 episodes | Kyle MacDougall | September 18, 2011 – March 3, 2013 | Teletoon at Night | Breakthrough Entertainment | |
| Knuckleheads | Sitcom | 3 seasons, 20 episodes | Michel Beaudet | January 12, 2012 – 2017 | Teletoon at Night | Salambo Productions | |
| Fugget About It | Sitcom | 3 seasons, 46 episodes | Nicholas Tabarrok | Original: September 7, 2012 – April 1, 2016 | Teletoon at Night (Note: Seasons 1-2) | Darius Films | |
| Fugget About It | Satire | 3 seasons, 46 episodes | Willem Wennekers | Adult Swim (Note: Season 3) | 9 Story Media Group | | |
| The Deerskins | Sitcom | 2 seasons, 26 episodes | Jerry Thevenet | September 8, 2013 – November 18, 2015 | APTN | JerryCo Communications | |
| 2 Nuts and a Richard! | Animated sitcom | 2 seasons, 38 episodes | Brendan Hay; Steven Levitan | September 2, 2015 – September 19, 2017 | Télétoon la nuit (Quebec French); Adult Swim (Canadian English) | Oasis Animation | |
| Night Sweats | Anthology | 1 season, 26 episodes | —N/a | September 4, 2015 – 2015 | Adult Swim Canada | Blue Ant Media | |
| Night Sweats | Anthology | 1 season, 26 episodes | —N/a | September 4, 2015 – 2015 | Adult Swim Canada | Mondo Media | |
| Total Drama Presents: The Ridonculous Race | Comedy; Parody; Satire | 1 season, 26 episodes | Jennifer Pertsch; Tom McGillis | September 7 - October 9, 2015 | Teletoon (Canada); Cartoon Network (United States) | Fresh TV | |
| Corner Gas Animated | Sitcom | 2 seasons, 24 episodes | Brent Butt | April 2, 2018 – present | CTV Comedy Channel | Smiley Guy Studios | |
| Corner Gas Animated | Sitcom | 2 seasons, 24 episodes | Brent Butt | April 2, 2018 – present | CTV Comedy Channel | Vida Spark Productions | |
| Corner Gas Animated | Sitcom | 2 seasons, 24 episodes | Brent Butt | April 2, 2018 – present | CTV Comedy Channel | Sparrow Media | |
| Corner Gas Animated | Sitcom | 2 seasons, 24 episodes | Brent Butt | April 2, 2018 – present | CTV Comedy Channel | Aslan Entertainment | |
| Corner Gas Animated | Sitcom | 2 seasons, 24 episodes | Brent Butt | April 2, 2018 – present | CTV Comedy Channel | Verite Productions | |
| Trailer Park Boys: The Animated Series | Sitcom | 2 seasons, 20 episodes | John Paul Tremblay | March 31, 2019 – May 22, 2020 | Netflix | Sunnyvale Productions | |
| Trailer Park Boys: The Animated Series | Black comedy | 2 seasons, 20 episodes | Robb Wells | March 31, 2019 – May 22, 2020 | Netflix | Swearnet Pictures | |
| Trailer Park Boys: The Animated Series | Mockumentary | 2 seasons, 20 episodes | Mike Smith | March 31, 2019 – May 22, 2020 | Netflix | Swearnet Pictures | |
| The Bizarre Stories of Professor Zarbi | Comedy; Supernatural | 2 seasons, 38 episodes | Michel Beaudet | September 5, 2019 – October 14, 2022 | Télétoon la nuit (Quebec French); Adult Swim (Canadian English) | Corus Entertainment; Salambo Productions | |

=== Latin America ===
| Title | Country | Genre | Seasons/episodes | Show creator(s) | Original release | Network | Studio | Source |
|---|---|---|---|---|---|---|---|---|
| La Mansión de los Políticos | Paraguay | Comedy | 2 seasons, 42 episodes | Christian Chena | July 27, 2011 – June 9, 2012 | Trece | Chena Animation | |
| Vulgarcito | Colombia | Black comedy | 2 seasons, 16 episodes | Diego Cardona | December 13, 2011 – 2018 | MTV Latin America | FiRe | |
| Vulgarcito | Colombia | Surreal humour | 2 seasons, 16 episodes | Andrés Vargas | December 13, 2011 – 2018 | MTV Latin America | FiRe | |
| La familia del barrio | Mexico | Black comedy | 5 seasons, 94 episodes | Sergio Lebrija | May 5, 2013 – 2018 | MTV Latin America | FireflyFilms | |
| La familia del barrio | Mexico | Satire | 5 seasons, 94 episodes | Arturo Navarro | May 5, 2013 – 2018 | MTV Latin America | FireflyFilms | |
| Homeless | Chile | Black comedy | 1 season, 13 episodes | Jorge Campusano; José Ignacio Navarro; Santiago O`Ryan | August 1, 2015 – October 25, 2015 | La Red | Lunes Animation Studio; Fábula | |
| Super Drags | Brazil | Superhero | 1 season, 5 episodes | Anderson Mahanski | November 9, 2018 | Netflix | Combo Estúdio | |
| Super Drags | Brazil | Comedy | 1 season, 5 episodes | Fernando Mendonça | November 9, 2018 | Netflix | Combo Estúdio | |
| Super Drags | Brazil | Comedy | 1 season, 5 episodes | Paulo Lescaut | November 9, 2018 | Netflix | Combo Estúdio | |

=== Spain ===
| Title | Genre | Seasons/episodes | Show creator(s) | Original release | Network | Studio | Source |
|---|---|---|---|---|---|---|---|
| Jokebox | Black comedy | 1 season, 13 episodes | Òscar Dalmau | October 16, 2011 – January 29, 2012 | TV3 | Greatest Hits SL | |
| Jokebox | Black comedy | 1 season, 13 episodes | Òscar Andreu | October 16, 2011 – January 29, 2012 | TV3 | Greatest Hits SL | |
| Heavies Tendres | Drama | 1 season, 8 episodes | • Juanjo Sáez • Iván Morales | February 4, 2018 – March 25, 2018 | El 33 | Producciones Jevis | |

=== France ===
| Title | Genre | Seasons/episodes | Show creator(s) | Original release | Network | Studio | Source |
|---|---|---|---|---|---|---|---|
| Les Kassos | Comedy; Parody | 4 seasons, 53 episodes | Yves Bigerel | December 2, 2013 – present | Canal+ | Bobby Prod; Canal+ | |
| Lastman | Action | 1 season, 26 episodes | Jérémie Périn | November 22, 2016 – present | France 4 (Note: Season 1) | Everybody On Deck | |
| Lastman | Fantasy | 1 season, 26 episodes | Jérémie Périn | November 22, 2016 – present | France.tv Slash (Note: Season 2) | Je suis bien content | |

Germany

| Title | Genre | Seasons/episodes | Show creator(s) | Original release | Network | Studio | Source |
|---|---|---|---|---|---|---|---|
| The Little Record Shop | Black comedy | 3 seasons, 36 episodes | N/A | September 8, 2010 – May 12, 2013 | Animax | Sony Pictures Television | |
| The Little Record Shop | Musical | 3 seasons, 36 episodes | N/A | September 8, 2010 – May 12, 2013 | Animax | Deutschland Gmbh Networks | |
| Noob & Nerd | Comedy | 1 season, 8 episodes | N/A | January 10 – May 14, 2013 | einsfestival | Spotting Image | |
| Japanoschlampen | Parody | 4 episodes | Coldmirror | May 23, 2013 – March 3, 2016 | einsfestival | N/A | |
| Deutsches Fleisch | Satire | 1 season, 8 episodes | David Hason | January 30 – March 27, 2014 | ZDFneo | ZDF Studios | |
| Deutsches Fleisch | Satire | 1 season, 8 episodes | Dino Grobe | January 30 – March 27, 2014 | ZDFneo | ZDF Studios | |
| Deutsches Fleisch | Satire | 1 season, 8 episodes | Nico Berthold | January 30 – March 27, 2014 | ZDFneo | ZDF Studios | |
| Höggschde Konzentration | Comedy | 2 seasons, 38 episodes | Peter Rütten | May 30, 2014 – July 11, 2016 | Tele 5 | The Blue Line Media Gmbh | |
| Höggschde Konzentration | Comedy | 2 seasons, 38 episodes | Kai Blasberg | May 30, 2014 – July 11, 2016 | Tele 5 | The Blue Line Media Gmbh | |
| Heroes – 5 Helden, keine Meinung | Comedy | 1 season, 3 episodes | Peter Rütten | October 17 – 31, 2014 | Tele 5 | The Blue Line Media Gmbh | |
| Heroes – 5 Helden, keine Meinung | Comedy | 1 season, 3 episodes | Kai Blasberg | October 17 – 31, 2014 | Tele 5 | The Blue Line Media Gmbh | |
| Muttis Kampf | Comedy | 1 season, 25 episodes | Peter Rütten | August 14 – September 25, 2017 | Tele 5 | The Blue Line Media Gmbh | |
| Muttis Kampf | Comedy | 1 season, 25 episodes | Kai Blasberg | August 14 – September 25, 2017 | Tele 5 | The Blue Line Media Gmbh | |

=== Australia ===
| Title | Genre | Seasons/episodes | Show creator(s) | Original release | Network | Studio | Status | Source |
|---|---|---|---|---|---|---|---|---|
| The Mike Nolan Show | Comedy | 1 season, 5 episodes | Jarrad Wright | September 12 – October 13, 2016 | Comedy Central | Ripstart Productions | Ended | |
| The Mike Nolan Show | Comedy | 1 season, 5 episodes | Izak Whear | September 12 – October 13, 2016 | Comedy Central | Ripstart Productions | Ended | |
| The Mike Nolan Show | Comedy | 1 season, 5 episodes | Tom Hollis | September 12 – October 13, 2016 | Comedy Central | Ripstart Productions | Ended | |
| Pacific Heat | Sitcom | 1 season, 13 episodes | Rob Sitch | November 27, 2016 – December 2, 2016 | The Comedy Channel | Working Dog Productions | Ended | |
| Pacific Heat | Sitcom | 1 season, 13 episodes | Santo Cilauro | November 27, 2016 – December 2, 2016 | Netflix | Working Dog Productions | Ended | |
| Pacific Heat | Sitcom | 1 season, 13 episodes | Tom Gleisner | November 27, 2016 – December 2, 2016 | Netflix | Working Dog Productions | Ended | |

=== New Zealand ===
| Title | Genre | Seasons/episodes | Show creator(s) | Original release | Network | Studio | Source |
|---|---|---|---|---|---|---|---|
| Aroha Bridge | Animated sitcom | 3 seasons, 21 episodes | Jessica Hansell | May 23, 2013 – August 30, 2019 | The New Zealand Herald (Season 1); Māori Television, Stuff (Season 3) | Piki Films | |

=== Denmark ===
| Title | Genre | Seasons/episodes | Show creator(s) | Original release | Network | Studio | Status | Source |
|---|---|---|---|---|---|---|---|---|
| Pandaerne | Satire | 3 seasons, 25 episodes | • Mikael Wulff • Anders Morgenthaler | January 19, 2011 – October 18, 2012 | DR2; DR HD | Copenhagen Bombay; Wulffmorgenthaler | Ended | |

=== India ===
| Title | Genre | Seasons/episodes | Show creator(s) | Original release | Network | Studio | Status | Source |
|---|---|---|---|---|---|---|---|---|
| Baahubali: The Lost Legends | Action; Historical drama | 4 seasons, 55 episodes | SS Rajamouli; Sharad Devarajan | April 19, 2017 – April 10, 2020 | Amazon Prime Video | Arka Media Works; Graphic India | Ended | |

=== Philippines ===
| Title | Genre | Seasons/episodes | Show creator(s) | Original release | Network | Studio | Status | Source |
|---|---|---|---|---|---|---|---|---|
| Alamat | Drama; Fantasy; Anthology | 2 seasons, 12 episodes | Jeffrey John Imutan | July 12, 2015 – June 19, 2016 | GMA Network | GMA News and Public Affairs; Red Door Animation Inc. Magic Tree Multimedia | Ended | |

=== Turkey ===
| Title | Genre | Seasons/episodes | Show creator(s) | Original release | Network | Studio | Source |
|---|---|---|---|---|---|---|---|
| Fırıldak Ailesi | Animated sitcom | 3 seasons, 80 episodes | Varol Yaşaroğlu | February 11, 2013 – July 27, 2016 | Star TV (2013); Grafi2000 YouTube Channel (2013–2016) teve2 (2014); TV8 (2015–2016) | | |

=== Italy ===
| Title | Genre | Seasons/episodes | Show creator(s) | Original release | Network | Studio | Source |
|---|---|---|---|---|---|---|---|
| Adrian | Animation; Science fiction Dystopian fiction | 1 season, 9 episodes | Adriano Celentano | January 21 – December 5, 2019 | Canale 5 (Mediaset) | | |

=== Syria ===
| Title | Genre | Seasons/episodes | Show creator(s) | Original release | Network | Studio | Source |
|---|---|---|---|---|---|---|---|
| Mawqef Micro | | 1 season, 30 episodes | | August 11, 2010 – 2016 | | | |

=== Co-productions ===
| Title | Country | Genre | Seasons/episodes | Show creator(s) | Original release | Network | Studio | Status | Source |
|---|---|---|---|---|---|---|---|---|---|
| The Ricky Gervais Show | United States | Comedy | 3 seasons, 39 episodes | Ricky Gervais; Stephen Merchant; Karl Pilkington | February 19, 2010 – July 13, 2012 | HBO (United States) | WildBrain Entertainment; Media Rights Capital; HBO Entertainment | Ended | |
| The Ricky Gervais Show | United Kingdom | Comedy | 3 seasons, 39 episodes | Ricky Gervais; Stephen Merchant; Karl Pilkington | February 19, 2010 – July 13, 2012 | Channel 4/E4 (United Kingdom) | WildBrain Entertainment; Media Rights Capital; HBO Entertainment | Ended | |
| Mother Up! | Canada | Comedy | 1 season, 13 episodes | Marnie Nir | November 6, 2013 – February 26, 2014 | Citytv | Broadway Video | Ended | |
| Mother Up! | United States | Comedy | 1 season, 13 episodes | Katherine Torpey | November 6, 2013 – February 26, 2014 | Hulu | Breakthrough Entertainment | Ended | |
| Mother Up! | United States | Comedy | 1 season, 13 episodes | Katherine Torpey | November 6, 2013 – February 26, 2014 | Hulu | Mass Animation | Ended | |
| Mother Up! | United States | Comedy | 1 season, 13 episodes | Katherine Torpey | November 6, 2013 – February 26, 2014 | Hulu | Bardel Entertainment | Ended | |
| Mother Up! | United States | Comedy | 1 season, 13 episodes | Katherine Torpey | November 6, 2013 – February 26, 2014 | Hulu | Rogers Media | Ended | |
| Gary and His Demons | United States; Canada | Comedy | 2 seasons, 26 episodes | Mark Little; Mark Satterthwaite | April 15, 2018 – October 6, 2022 | VRV (season 1); Freevee (season 2) | Mondo Media; Solis Animation; Look Mom! Productions; Blue Ant Media | Ended | |
| Watership Down | United Kingdom | Drama | 4 episodes | based on the novel by Richard Adams | December 22, 2018 – December 23, 2018 | BBC One | Brown Bag Films | Miniseries | |
| Watership Down | Ireland | Fantasy | 4 episodes | based on the novel by Richard Adams | December 22, 2018 – December 23, 2018 | Netflix | Biscuit Filmworks | Miniseries | |
| Watership Down | United States | Fantasy | 4 episodes | based on the novel by Richard Adams | December 22, 2018 – December 23, 2018 | Netflix | BBC | Miniseries | |
| Watership Down | United States | Fantasy | 4 episodes | based on the novel by Richard Adams | December 22, 2018 – December 23, 2018 | Netflix | Netflix | Miniseries | |

=== Pilots ===
| Title | Genre | Show creator(s) | Original release | Network | Studio | Source |
|---|---|---|---|---|---|---|
| Cheyenne Cinnamon and the Fantabulous Unicorn of Sugar Town Candy Fudge | Musical comedy | Dave Willis | March 29, 2010 | Adult Swim | Williams Street | |

=== Unaired ===
| Title | Genre | Seasons/episodes | Show creator(s) | Original release | Network | Studio | Status | Source |
|---|---|---|---|---|---|---|---|---|
| Murder Police | Sitcom | 1 season, 13 episodes | David A. Goodman | 2013 | Fox | 20th Television | Unaired | |
| Murder Police | Sitcom | 1 season, 13 episodes | Jason Ruiz | 2013 | Fox | Bento Box Entertainment | Unaired | |
| Gen Zed | Comedy | 1 season, 8 episodes | Hayden Black | 2015 | Revision3 | Studio71 | Unaired | |
| Cassius and Clay | Comedy | 1 season, 10 episodes | Adam Reed | 2016 | FXX | Floyd County Productions | Unaired | |
| Cassius and Clay | Comedy | 1 season, 10 episodes | Adam Reed | 2016 | FXX | FX Productions | Unaired | |
| The Cops | Comedy | 1 season, 10 episodes | Louis C.K. | 2018 | TBS | Studio T | Unaired | |
| The Cops | Comedy | 1 season, 10 episodes | Albert Brooks | 2018 | TBS | FX Productions | Unaired | |
| The Cops | Comedy | 1 season, 10 episodes | Albert Brooks | 2018 | TBS | Starburns Industries | Unaired | |
| Deadpool | Superhero | 1 season, 10 episodes | Donald Glover | 2018 | FXX | Marvel Television | Unaired | |
| Deadpool | Comedy | 1 season, 10 episodes | Stephen Glover | 2018 | FXX | FX Productions | Unaired | |
| Deadpool | Comedy | 1 season, 10 episodes | Stephen Glover | 2018 | FXX | ABC Signature Studios | Unaired | |

== See also ==
- List of adult animated television series
  - List of adult animated television series before 1990
  - List of adult animated television series of the 1990s
  - List of adult animated television series of the 2000s
- LGBT representation in adult animation
- Modern animation in the United States
- Lists of animated feature films
- Independent animation
- Animation in the United States in the television era
- Cartoon violence
