= Canadian cartoons =

Canadian cartoons may refer to:

- Canadian animation
- Canadian comics and cartooning
