= Night Sweats =

Canadian television series

Night Sweats is a Canadian animated anthology series with live-action/CGI filler segments hosted by Bart Batchelor and Chris Nielsen. It is a compilation of the animated shorts created as part of the Bite on Mondo program, a joint venture of Blue Ant Media's BiteTV (now Makeful), and Mondo Media, in which Canadian animators pitched ideas for new shows. The show consists of 26 episodes.

The series was originally intended to air on Teletoon at Night but instead premiered on Adult Swim on September 4, 2015, and later aired on Teletoon at Night on February 29, 2016.

The series were also broadcast on El Rey Network and later on G4 in the United States, MTV on Europe and Latin America and on Animax in South Africa.
