= Télétoon la nuit =

Television programming block

- Current logo used since September 1, 2020.
- Network: Télétoon
- Launched: September 2, 2002; 24 years ago
- Country of origin: Canada
- Format: Teen-oriented animated block (2002–2005); Adult-oriented animated block (2005–present)
- Running time: 9:00 p.m. - 3:00 a.m.
- Official website: https://www.teletoonlanuit.com/

Télétoon la nuit (branded as TÉLÉTOON la Nuit) is a Canadian French language late-night programming block that targets older teen and adult audiences which airs from 9 p.m. to 3 a.m. ET every night on the Canadian television channel Télétoon.

The block launched in September 2002 as the French-language counterpart to Teletoon at Night, which aired on the English Teletoon. Like its English counterpart, Télétoon la nuit originated as two separate blocks: "Le Détour sur Télétoon" was geared towards older adolescents, while "Télétoon Dechaîne!" was intended for adults. In 2005, both blocks were amalgamated as an adult-oriented animated block. On September 1, 2008, it was renamed "Télétoon Détour". The block was revamped once again in September 2009 to "Télétoon la nuit".

The block would outlive its English counterpart when Teletoon at Night was discontinued and succeeded by the newly launched Adult Swim channel on April 1, 2019.

== Programming ==
Old Télétoon la nuit logo from 2009 to 2014. In 2014, it was revised to include an acute accent on the e letters

=== Current programming ===
The network has been known to broadcast slightly different programming than its English-language counterpart. This is because of differences between the English and French television markets and the differences between each program and its English or French dub's license agreement. For example, South Park and Les Simpson have long been staple programming for Télétoon, while their original English-language versions would air on The Comedy Network and, later, Much instead of English Teletoon.

As of November 2026:

- Bravest Warriors
- Défis extrêmes (Total Drama)
- Haha, You Clowns
- Les Histoires bizarres du professeur Zarbi (The Bizarre Stories of Professor Zarbi)
- Mes aventures avec Superman (My Adventures with Superman)
- President Curtis
- Psi Cops: Escouade Paranormale
- Red Ketchup
- Rick et Morty (Rick and Morty)
- Robot Chicken
- Samouraï Jack (Samurai Jack)
- Smiling Friends
- The Venture Bros.
- Your Pretty Face Is Going to Hell

=== Upcoming programming ===
- Common Side Effects (November 26, 2026)
- Get Jiro (November 26, 2026)

=== Former programming ===
Programs previously broadcast on Teletoon Dechaine!/Le Détour sur Télétoon/Télétoon Détour/Télétoon la Nuit:

- American Dad!
- Animatrix
- Archer
- Au pays des Têtes à claques (Knuckleheads)
- Les Awesomes (The Awesomes)
- Batman (Batman: The Animated Series)
- Batman, la relève (Batman Beyond)
- Bob's Burgers
- Bob et Margaret (Bob and Margaret)
- Les Boondocks (The Boondocks)
- Célibataire Cherche (The Dating Guy)
- Ciné Maniac (Home Movies)
- La Clique (Undergrads)
- Clone High
- La Côte Ouest (The Wrong Coast)
- Creature Commandos
- Dans L'Canyon (Crash Canyon)
- Danny Fantôme (Danny Phantom)
- Daria
- Les Décalés du cosmos (Tripping the Rift)
- Les Déchiqueteurs (The Ripping Friends)
- Les lascars (The homiez)
- Delta State
- Faut pas rêver (Fugget About It)
- Les Frères Apocalypse (Doomsday Brothers)
- Futurama
- Les Grandes Gueules s'animent! (2 Nuts and a Richard!)
- Les Griffin (Family Guy)
- Henri pis sa gang (King of the Hill)
- Huntik : Á la recherche des Titans (Huntik: Secrets & Seekers)
- Kite Man: Hell Yeah!
- La ligue des justiciers: Nouvelle génération (Young Justice)
- Malice et menaces (Grim and Evil)
- Martin Mystére (Martin Mystery)
- Mike Ward Show
- Mysticons
- Naruto
- Nouvelle Ligue des justiciers (Justice League Unlimited)
- La Patrouille du Temps (Time Squad)
- Les Pierrafeu (The Flintstones)
- Planète Crue (Daft Planet)
- Polyvalente Baptiste Huard (Bromwell High)
- Primal
- Le P'tit ?%*&$! (Angry Kid)
- Punch!
- Quads! de John Callahan (John Callahan's Quads!)
- Randy Cunningham, le Ninja (Randy Cunningham: 9th Grade Ninja)
- Rick et Steve (Rick & Steve: The Happiest Gay Couple in All the World)
- Le Roi de Las Vegas (Father of the Pride)
- Les Simpsons (The Simpsons)
- South Park
- Star ou Boucher (Sons of Butcher)
- Station X
- Storm Hawks
- Teen Titans: Les Jeunes Titans (Teen Titans)
- Le Télétoon Show
- Têtes à claques
- Les tortues ninja (Teenage Mutant Ninja Turtles)
- Ultimate Spider-Man
- La vie est un zoo (Life's a Zoo)
- X-Men
- Yu-Gi-Oh!
