= Knuckleheads =

Canadian animated television series

- Genre: Sitcom
- Starring: Joe Cobden
- Voices of: Sean Cullen
- Opening theme: Kim Gaboury
- Country of origin: Canada
- Original languages: Quebec French; English
- No. of seasons: 3
- No. of episodes: 38

Production
- Running time: 22 minutes
- Production company: Salambo Productions

Original release
- Network: Télétoon la nuit(Quebec French); Adult Swim(Canadian English, Season 1); Teletoon at Night(Canadian English, Season 2); Canal+ Family(France)
- Release: January 12, 2012

Knuckleheads (original French-language title: Au pays des Têtes à claques) is a Canadian adult animated series based on Têtes à claques. The show first aired on Télétoon la nuit on January 12, 2012 as a preview, with regular airings starting on March 1, 2012. It also premiered in France on January 15, 2012 on Canal+ Family.

The English-language version of the show has aired in English-speaking Canada (originally considered for broadcast in the United States as well) and was in production from the winter of 2012. This version premiered on Adult Swim on January 8, 2016. It also began airing on Teletoon at Night on June 6, 2016.
