= Station X (Canadian TV series) =

- Directed by: Didier Loubat
- Country of origin: Canada
- No. of seasons: 1
- No. of episodes: 13

Production
- Production company: Cité-Amérique

Original release
- Network: Teletoon at Night/Télétoon la nuit
- Release: September 3, 2005

Station X is a Canadian adult animated/live-action series that aired on both the English and French channels of Teletoon at Night/Télétoon la nuit in 2005. The show revolved around six young media-savvy people, in their late teens to early twenties, all living in a loft in Montreal.

Station X was created by Quebec-based film producer Cité-Amérique, now part of FRV Media. Episodes were produced in English and dubbed to produce the corresponding French episodes, although text that appeared on the screen was in French, such as the election posters in "Power".

== Characters ==
From left to right: Kandi, Davis, Jesse, Seven, Slate, Knob.

- Kandi: 17, blonde, fashion conscious, hypoglycemic
- Davis: 22, African Canadian, works as an editor for a magazine
- Knob: 20, works as sound guy for live and studio bands
- Seven: of Asian-Canadian and Indian heritage
- Slate: 19, a movie aficionado
- Jesse: a web designer, and considered the alpha of the group

== Style ==
The show's style is noted for being unique with its combination of original animation and film clips.

Most clips are music videos, although other clips, such as pieces of movies or televisions shows, are also shown. Notable sources include The Kids in the Hall and Sam Roberts, and many episodes contain an Angry Kid short.

The episodes had minimal plots. In each episode one character had a moral dilemma or issue, and they would discuss it with each of the other characters, each showing their point of view on the subject. A clip would then play, usually referenced to in the discussion, and occasionally directly introduced, to illustrate their point.

Another unique feature of Station X is that there the screen was never filled. For each camera angle the image had a different shape and size with an edge looked rough, like torn paper. Sometimes two different angles of the same scene where shown at the same time. Even the film clips didn't fill the screen, as widescreen movie clips and music videos where shown letter boxed, while 4:3 video was shown smaller with blank space around all four sides, with the source information under it at the beginning and end of the clip. For the Madness episode, the blank space was white instead of black.

Series designed and directed by Didier Loubat

Artistic Direction by Carole Roy

Animated Shorts by Patrick

Layouts by Wayne Millett

Props by Jean-Pascal

Lead animation by Yann Tremblay

== Episodes ==
Episode 1x12: "Sex" was a teaser episode that aired on 12 August. The series regular run started the next month, on 3 September, and ended 20 November 2005.

- 1x1: "Violence" September 3, 2005
- 1x2: "Chance" September 4, 2005
- 1x3: "Guts" September 11, 2005
- 1x4: "Madness" September 18, 2005
- 1x5: "Fashion" September 25, 2005
- 1x6: "Money" October 2, 2005
- 1x7: "Hope" October 9, 2005

Seven tries to convince a homeless woman to accept her help and have hope.

- 1x8: "Different" October 16, 2005
- 1x9: "Excess" October 23, 2005
- 1x10: "Humiliation" October 30, 2005
- 1x11: "Power" November 6, 2005

Seven tries to convince the others to support a political candidate, but they believe the candidate will be corrupted by power.

- 1x12: "Sex" August 12, 2005
- 1x13: "Reality" November 20, 2005

== See also ==
- The Kids in the Hall
- Sam Roberts
- Angry Kid
