= The Bizarre Stories of Professor Zarbi =

Canadian adult animated sitcom

- Les Histoires bizarres du professeur Zarbi
- Genre: Comedy; Supernatural
- Created by: Michel Beaudet
- Written by: Michel Beaudet; Mikael Archambault; Charles-Alex Durand; Boris Dolivet
- Directed by: Michel Beaudet; Simon Parizeau
- Voices of: Michel Beaudet
- Composer: Kim Gaboury
- Country of origin: Canada
- Original language: French
- No. of seasons: 2
- No. of episodes: 54

Production
- Executive producer: Hugues Dufour
- Producers: Michel Beaudet; Simon Parizeau
- Running time: 22 minutes
- Production companies: Corus Entertainment; Salambo Productions

Original release
- Network: Télétoon la nuit (Quebec French); Adult Swim (Canadian English)
- Release: September 5, 2019 – October 14, 2022

The Bizarre Stories of Professor Zarbi (original French-language title: Les Histoires bizarres du professeur Zarbi) is a Canadian adult animated supernatural comedy television series. It premiered in French on Télétoon's Télétoon la nuit block on September 5, 2019. An English version of the series debuted on January 15, 2021, on Adult Swim in Canada.

Created by Michel Beaudet and Salambo Productions, the series follows an eccentric professor and his sidekick neighbour as they confront paranormal activities across Quebec. Each episode is designed around tropes common to horror fiction, many times offering direct homages to specific films.

== Production ==
The series was officially announced by Télétoon on May 16, 2018. It was created by Michel Beaudet and Salambo Productions, who previously worked on Knuckleheads for the network on its spinoff. Unlike their prior work which combined multiple mediums, Zarbi is an entirely animated production, utilizing Toon Boom Harmony. Télétoon greenlit the series in favour of another season of 2 Nuts and a Richard!. The first 10 episodes of an initial 20 episode order began airing in French Canada on September 5, 2019.

Like Knuckleheads, Beaudet voices most of the characters in the French version of the series. In the English version, Zarbi is played by Terrence Scammell, with his assistant Benjamin voiced by Angela Galuppo.
