= The Wrong Coast =

- The Wrong Coast conclusion screenshot
- Created by: Adam Shaheen
- Starring: Mark Hamill; Kathy Greenwood; Marc Thompson; Tracy Nicole Chapman
- Countries of origin: United States; Canada
- No. of episodes: 26 (segments); 13 (episodes)

Production
- Executive producers: John Morayniss; Noreen Halplern; Mark Hamill; Adam Shaheen (for Cuppa Coffee)
- Running time: approx. 0:11 (per segment) approx. 0:22 (per episode)
- Production companies: Curious Pictures; Cuppa Coffee Studios; Blueprint Entertainment

Original release
- Network: The Movie Network
- Release: April 7 – June 30, 2004

The Wrong Coast is a stop motion adult animated television series. The series emulates a Hollywood gossip show with fake news and features, and includes many parodies of Hollywood films, often utilizing the voices of real stars. It was produced by Blueprint Entertainment, Cuppa Coffee Studios and Curious Pictures, with stop-motion animation provided by Cuppa Coffee Studios. The theme song is performed by They Might Be Giants. The show features Mark Hamill as the voice of Jameson Burkwright.

The series initially was to air for American audiences on AMC in December 2003, but never did. It began airing in Canada on The Movie Network in April 2004. Teletoon at Night has rebroadcast the original season in Canada since 19 August 2005. A French-dubbed version of the series, titled La Côte Ouest, aired in Canada on Télétoon la nuit. The series ended on 30 June 2004.

The full series has been released on DVD in Australia.

== Characters ==
- Jameson Burkwright (voiced by Mark Hamill) - The male host of the show who is easily jealous of Debbie Sue's actions. As of the end of the first season, Jameson is trapped in Hell.
- Debbie Sue Ashanti-Melendez (voiced by Kathy Greenwood) is the bubbly, but sometimes ditzy female host of the show.
- Ti Hua Foo (voiced by Marc Thompson) - The male reporter of the show. Ti Hua is always seen covering celebrity events and interviews. As of the end of the first season, Ti Hua has been turned into a talking guinea pig.
- Julie Wyvern (voiced by Tracy Nicole Chapman) - The female reporter on the show. She has a bitter rivalry with Debbie Sue. As of the end of the first season, she is the new co-host of The Wrong Coast.
- Mack (voiced by A. D. Miles) - The producer of the show whose face is never shown until the last episode, where it is revealed he has no face.

== Episodes ==
The Wrong Coast aired for one season consisting of 13 episodes.

=== The Acting Coach ===
Debbie Sue hires an acting coach to help her land the part of a journalist in the new Tom Hanks movie. Jameson tries to get in on the action by showing off his comic dialects.

Sketches

- A Beautiful Behind - A parody of A Beautiful Mind
- The Ted Kennedy Experiment - The Jamie Kennedy Experiment
- The Godfather Part IV: All Pacino - The Godfather Trilogy
- Sob Story
- 28 Days After, 28 Days Later After - 28 Days Later
- Cash Cow
- Finding Nemoy - Finding Nemo
- Project Stoplight - Project Greenlight
- American Idle Idol - American Idol
- S.W.A.T.A.W.A.T.A.T.A.A. (Special Weapon And Tactics As Well As The Ability To Appraise Antiques) - S.W.A.T., Antiques Roadshow

=== The Office Party ===
A young production assistant blackmails Jameson and Debbie Sue with a tape of their drunken behavior at the annual Christmas party. Jameson ignores the threat while Debbie Sue becomes paranoid about what she may have done.

Sketches

- 70's Movie - Wayans brothers films, Jaws, Butch Cassidy and the Sundance Kid, Rocky
- Apollo the 13th - Alien, Apollo 13, Friday the 13th
- Sort of But Not That Freaky Friday - Freaky Friday
- Joe Trillionaire - Joe Millionaire
- Batman Meets the Hulk - Batman, The Incredible Hulk
- Stephen King's Break
- Dog Stars
- Wacky Neighbours
- Blood Spattered Banter - Quentin Tarantino films
- Party Time Continuum: The Stephen Hawking Story - Austin Powers

=== Chemistry ===
Debbie Sue is determined to "connect" with Jameson after a bad review highlights their lack of teamwork. However, Jameson is distracted by the loss of his beloved pet ferret, Marty.

Sketches

- American Booty - American Beauty, Bringing Down the House
- Glengarry GlenCampbell - Glengarry Glen Ross and singer Glen Campbell
- CSI: Sarasota - Parody of the CSI: Crime Scene Investigation spinoffs (CSI: Miami, CSI: NY)
- Glitter at the Crossroads - Glitter, Crossroads
- Dying Hard in an Elevator - Die Hard
- My Big Fat Greek Matrix - My Big Fat Greek Wedding, The Matrix

=== The Broken Teleprompter ===
When the teleprompter breaks down, Debbie Sue and Jameson are forced to think for themselves. Jameson's attempt to ad-lib the news starts a rumor that Kevin Spacey is trying to kill Queen Latifah.

Sketches

- First Wives Fight Club - The First Wives Club, Fight Club
- Magical Black Men - Magical Negro; Bruce Almighty, The Legend of Bagger Vance, The Family Man
- Jack Morris' Life - Parody of movie trailer announcers, such as Don LaFontaine and Hal Douglas
- Dr. Phil talks to Freckles
- Willy Shatner and the Chocolate Factory - William Shatner, Star Trek, Willy Wonka & the Chocolate Factory
- Dead and Deader - Dumb and Dumber, The Sixth Sense
- Eminem tries out for Romeo and Juliet

=== Blood Red Carpet ===
There is much chaos as a horde of man-eating tigers takes over the red carpet at the 76th Annual Big Gold Awards. Jameson and Debbie Sue show "live" footage of the attacks, while showing clips of the Best Picture nominees.

Sketches

- When Harry Met Sally Struthers - When Harry Met Sally...
- Pizza Deliverance - Deliverance
- Brilliantly Dumb - Forrest Gump, I Am Sam, Rain Man, The Other Sister
- Water Wolves - Waterworld, Dances with Wolves
- Flatch Adams - Patch Adams

=== Your Stalker or Mine? ===
Debbie Sue brags that her new stalker is the ultimate celebrity status symbol, and when Jameson gets jealous, he attempts to attract his own stalker. While arguing over who is in the most danger, their stalkers become more interested in each other.

Sketches

- Seabisque - Seabiscuit, Iron Chef, and a small reference to Spider-Man
- N.Y.P.D.A.D.D - N.Y.P.D., Attention deficit hyperactivity disorder
- Endless Moaning
- Big Baby - Big
- Late Night Laughs - The Tonight Show with Jay Leno
- What Are You Doing In My Bedroom? The Jameson Burkright Story
- Feasting for Famine

=== Salaries ===
Jameson is shocked to find Debbie Sue on a list of Hollywood's richest people. His jealousy turns to ridicule, however, when she finally tells the source of her extra income, her work at a fortune telling hotline.

Sketches

- Mission: Impossible 3 (the only sketch that actually came to the big screen)
- Dr. Cop Lawyer - Medical dramas/Police procedurals/Legal dramas; Law & Order
- Texas Chainsaw Manicure - The Texas Chain Saw Massacre
- Crocodile Dundee Hunter - Crocodile Dundee, The Crocodile Hunter
- Second Term Terminator: Re-election Day - Terminator 3: Rise of the Machines, The 2003 California gubernatorial recall election

=== The Infies ===
After Debbie Sue wins an Infy infotainment award, Jameson gets jealous and quits. But Debbie Sue goes on just fine without him, so Jameson tries to get his way back on the show.

Sketches

- Jettison Man - Spider-Man, The Tick
- Queer Eye for the Bad Guy - Queer Eye for the Straight Guy
- Golden Girls Gone Wild - The Golden Girls, Girls Gone Wild
- Stormbringer 2
- Charlie's Angels: Full Frontal - Charlie's Angels: Full Throttle

=== Lights! Camera! Romance! ===
After Jameson saves Debbie Sue from a falling stage light, she falls in love with him. But the romance quickly deteriorates into mind games, and it isn't long before the tears are flowing.

Sketches

- The Onion Ring - The Ring
- 762,120 - 24
- Poltergoat - Poltergeist
- Beer Factor - Fear Factor
- P. Diddy Day Care - Daddy Day Care
- Al Pacino's Sitcom
- How to Lose a Guy in 28 Days Later - How to Lose a Guy in 10 Days, 28 Days Later

=== Sundance ===
Jameson and Debbie Sue report from the Sundance Film Festival. Ti Hua overreacts to being stranded in a gondola with John Turturro, and Julie continually attempts to get into an A-list party.

Sketches

- Uno Memento - Memento
- American Pi - American Pie, Pi
- Buzz
- Troubled Youth - Prozac Nation
- The Horse Shouterer - The Horse Whisperer

=== Addicted ===
Debbie Sue returns from "back surgery" with a huge appetite for painkillers. Jameson plans an intervention to get her off from her addiction by enlisting several B-listers who need screen time. Meanwhile, Ti Hua undergoes the ultimate makeover, but gets turned into a guinea pig.

Sketches

- Dead Movie Star Jurassic Park - Jurassic Park
- A Few Good Men and a Baby - A Few Good Men, Three Men and a Baby
- Complidate - Blind Date
- Tragedy on the Tracks
- Operation Perfect Smile
- The Re-enactment of the Siege of Bolingbroke - Siege of Bolingbroke Castle
- Transspecies
- Law & Order: P.V.U. (Parking Violations Unit) - Law & Order: SVU

=== Possessed ===
Jameson and Debbie Sue are shocked to discover that the Wrong Coast studio is possessed by a demon. An attempt to exorcise the demon backfires, and Jameson gets stranded in Hell.

Sketches

- There's Something About Mary Poppins - There's Something About Mary, Mary Poppins
- Titanic II - Titanic
- Dennis Hopper Orders a Margarita
- Siegfried & Roy return to the stage - Siegfried & Roy, Roy's tiger injury

=== A Look Back at Yestermonth ===
A clip show showing a look back at the first season of The Wrong Coast. With Jameson stranded in Hell, Debbie Sue is happy that she is the only host left - until Julie Wyvern joins as co-host. A sip of champagne pushes Debbie Sue off the wagon, and Mack finally reveals his "face".

Sketches (Selected from previous episodes)

- Seabisque - Seabiscuit, Iron Chef, and a small reference to Spider-Man
- My Big Fat Greek Matrix - My Big Fat Greek Wedding, The Matrix
- American Booty - American Beauty, Bringing Down The House
- Crocodile Dundee Hunter - The Crocodile Hunter, Crocodile Dundee
- Dying Hard in an Elevator - Die Hard
- Magical Black Men - MMagical Negro; Bruce Almighty, The Legend of Bagger Vance, The Family Man
- Flatch Adams - Patch Adams
- The Horse Shouterer - The Horse Whisperer
- S.W.A.T.A.W.A.T.A.T.A.A. - S.W.A.T., Antiques Roadshow
- Charlie's Angels: Full Frontal - Charlie's Angels: Full Throttle

== See also ==
- Spitting Image
- Les Guignols
- This Hour Has 22 Minutes
- The Daily Show
