= Punch! (TV series) =

2008 Canadian animated comedy series

Punch! is a Canadian animated series that first aired on Teletoon at Night on January 11, 2008, and Télétoon la nuit on January 25, 2008. It was cancelled after a single season of 20 episodes, although both blocks continued to air it very late at night for some time.
