= Daft Planet =

- Created by: Brent Donnelly; Derry Smith
- Written by: Derry Smith; Brent Donnelly
- Directed by: Jon Minnis
- Starring: Oliver Grainger; Mark Hauser; Susan Alamgren; Sonja Ball; Jaclyn Linetsky; Ellen David; Arthur Holden; Matt Holland; Michael Perron; Felicia Schulman; Terrence Scammell; Brigid Tierney
- Country of origin: Canada
- No. of seasons: 1
- No. of episodes: 13 (list of episodes)

Production
- Production company: CinéGroupe

Original release
- Network: The Detour On Teletoon
- Release: September 2 – December 23, 2002

Daft Planet is a Canadian cartoon, first airing on Teletoon. The first episode ran on September 2, 2002 and the show continued to run for almost two years even though only 13 episodes were produced. Its main claim to fame is that it was the first cartoon in the world that was animated entirely in Flash and appeared on a national television network. The show met with some success but was taken off the air when funding ran out due to cuts to the CTF program. The show was born from a 10-minute pilot written and animated by Brent Donnelly and Derry Smith and produced by Valis Video (Toronto). The pilot can be viewed on YouTube along with some aired episodes of Daft Planet.

== Plot ==
The plot, set in the fictional Maple City, encircles the day-to-day lives of the protagonists, Ched and Hudson, in their on-going struggle to keep up with the latest trends and maintain their positions in the social hierarchy in high school. With Ched living from a trailer park, as the son of a taxidermist and Hudson as the son of a wealthy network executive, a parallel is drawn between the two characters, offering unlikely chemistry. No one in the show has necks, and their heads just float over their bodies, but this is never mentioned and they have no apparent difficulty doing things that would require necks, like eating or breathing.

== Episodes ==
No.	Title	Original release date
1	"Cool Hunters"	September 2, 2002
A mysterious new senior starts a "cool" frenzy at Maple Central High; Ched and Hudson quickly become irritated with the chaos his popularity has created.
2	"Fashion Victims"	September 16, 2002
A high-powered designer lures Ched into the seductive world of fashion; Hudson has his hands full with the designer's daughter and his controversial haute couture.
3	"Family Feud"	September 9, 2002
The Stiles' life is turned upside-down when Fred's bitter rival returns to Maple City and threatens his TV empire; unfortunately for Hudson, his capricious heart is caught in the crossfire.
4	"The New Me- Kinda"	September 23, 2002
Ched, Hudson and their science class learn first-hand about the horror and the beauty of human cloning.
5	"Requiem for a Game"	October 10, 2002
Ched and Hudson stumble upon the coolest hand-held video game ever made as Bitzi struggles to shake her obsession with Timmy from Magnetik.
6	"Trading Faces"	October 24, 2002
In their search for cooler parents, Ched and Hudson find themselves in each other's shoes; the secrets of Bitzi's scandalous past are dug up by a ruthless reporter.
7	"Snitchy and the Phobe"	October 17, 2002
A terrifying discovery at an all-you-can-eat buffet sends Hudson spiraling toward madness in this epic man vs. germ psychological thriller.
8	"Evil Boxatrons"	November 7, 2002
Tired of Jake's incessant TV habit, Francine sends him to be "reprogrammed" while Ched and Hudson get their first TV show and find out how stupid the tube really is.
9	"Pug: A Mascot Betrayed"	November 14, 2002
A scourge of vandalism in the days leading up to the unveiling of Maple Central's new mascot lead Principal Dubinsky to tighten school security and point his giant red finger at Hudson.
10	"The Footprints of Nanigans"	October 31, 2002
Hudson's older brother Albert finally scores a stand-up comedy gig thanks to his seven foot tall, lime-green fuzzy friend; for the first time, Ched questions his rock star dream.
11	"Drat That Frat!"	November 21, 2002
A classic Dickensian tale of a boy (Ched) dispossessed by the rich brotherhood of the Delta Felta Pi fraternity and his friend (Hudson), whose father is his easy ticket in..
12	"Virtual Utopia"	November 28, 2002
Iggy discovers a top secret technology that allows him to create his own fantastic worlds. As his "real" body deteriorates, his larger-than-life avatars run amok in cyberspace.
13	"Karmacade"	December 23, 2002
Ched and Hudson learn the true meaning of chaos theory in this whimsical and thought-provoking look at karma in a stylistic video game format.
