= Teletoon at Night =

Former Canadian television block

- Network: Teletoon
- Launched: September 2002; 24 years ago
- Closed: April 1, 2019; 7 years ago
- Country of origin: Canada
- Owner: Teletoon Canada, Inc. (Corus Entertainment)
- Headquarters: Toronto, Ontario, Canada
- Running time: 6 hours
- Original language: English

Teletoon at Night (previously branded as The Detour on Teletoon and Teletoon Detour) was a late-night programming block that aired on Teletoon. It primarily carried adult animation and other programming targeting adult audiences.

Teletoon had carried programming targeting teen and adult audiences during the prime time and late night hours since its launch. The channel eventually established formal brands for such programming, The Detour on Teletoon and Teletoon Unleashed, in 2001 and 2002; by 2004, the "Unleashed" block was discontinued.

Teletoon at Night was similar in format to the Adult Swim block of Cartoon Network, from which the block acquired most of its programming. A Canadian version of Adult Swim was launched as a block on the Canadian Cartoon Network channel when it launched in 2012. The two blocks operated in parallel, with most Adult Swim original series eventually moving to Cartoon Network, and Teletoon at Night focusing on other original and acquired adult animation series, as well as films.

On April 1, 2019, the block was discontinued, with its remaining programming moving to the Adult Swim channel, which launched around this time. The block's French counterpart, Télétoon la nuit, continues to air on Télétoon.

== History ==
Teletoon Detour logo used from 2008 to 2010. The "Detour" logotype was first introduced in 2007.

=== Origins ===
Since its launch in October 1997, Teletoon had included a selection of adult-targeted programming during the nighttime hours. This initially included series such as Duckman, The Simpsons, Captain Star, Highlander: The Animated Series, Dilbert, and Pond Life, as well as animation documentaries and some uncensored anime films.

In 2001, with the launch of the Adult Swim block on Cartoon Network in the U.S., and the increasing popularity of adult animation, Teletoon launched the adult-oriented Teletoon Unleashed block in September 2001, followed by the teenage-oriented Detour on Teletoon, which launched in September 2002.

=== The Detour on Teletoon/Teletoon Unleashed (2001–2004) ===
Programming featured on The Detour on Teletoon targeted teenagers aged 12 to 17 with risqué/dramatic animation aimed at older youth, such as The Ren & Stimpy Show, The Ripping Friends, The Tick, Spy Groove, Daft Planet, Time Squad, Grim & Evil, Cybersix, Family Guy, Futurama, Star Wars: Clone Wars, and Aqua Teen Hunger Force.

Teletoon Unleashed targeted young adults aged 18 to 34 with more mature themed animated programming, including Undergrads, John Callahan's Quads, Mission Hill, The Oblongs, Spicy City, Todd MacFarlane's Spawn, The Head, The Maxx, Baby Blues, Clone High, Harvey Birdman: Attorney at Law, The Animatrix, MTV's Downtown, and Home Movies.

During this period, in order to specify the audience group each block were targeting, content classification was applied. For example, regardless of the fact that only a minority (Quads or Spawn) were explicit enough to require "adults-only" designation, all programs on Teletoon Unleashed were classified with the 18+ rating. While the Detour programming were classified with 14+.

The Unleashed branding was discontinued in March 2004, due to most of the line-up only consisting of a single season of around 13 episodes, with no new content being produced and constant reruns resulting in the brand's discontinuation.

=== The Detour on Teletoon (2004–2008) ===
By September 2004, the two original blocks were merged under The Detour on Teletoon branding, featuring redesigned bumpers created by Guru Studio, intending to target the 12–34 demographic with programming described as being "mature". In addition to programming with these blocks, such as Family Guy, Futurama, and Grim & Evil, new programming featured included Delta State, Zeroman, and The Brak Show, with others such as Bromwell High, Sons of Butcher, Station X, The Wrong Coast, The Venture Bros, and The Boondocks debuting throughout 2005.

In September 2006, six new Adult Swim originals debuted on The Detour, Tom Goes to the Mayor, Space Ghost: Coast to Coast, Stroker & Hoop, 12 oz. Mouse, Squidbillies, and Robot Chicken, as part of a new companion block called F-Night. The acquisition of Space Ghost: Coast to Coast was particularly notable, as Teletoon had been attempting to acquire it starting in 2004, but had struggled to have a licensing deal for two years.

On February 5, 2007, another rebrand occurred, aligning with the rebranding of Teletoon. Following the success of the previous season, the block's fall 2007 lineup included eight more Adult Swim originals, Metalocalypse, Sealab 2021, The Smoking Gun, Moral Orel, Assy McGee, Perfect Hair Forever, Frisky Dingo, and Minoriteam. However, some non-Adult Swim original programming such as Family Guy were removed from the block. Also during this time, most of the shows that were featured on F-Night were removed to make room for a new segment named F'N Good Movie, which became a part of Detour's Saturday lineup, devoted to airing adult-oriented live-action and animated films, such as 300, The Room, V for Vendetta, and Labyrinth.

=== Teletoon Detour (2008–2009) ===
In 2008, the block amended its name to Teletoon Detour. Programming introduced during 2008 and 2009 included Rick & Steve: The Happiest Gay Couple in All the World, The Critic, Angry Kid, Punch!, American Dad!, Code Monkeys, Father of the Pride, and Life's a Zoo, as well as the Adult Swim originals Lucy, Daughter of the Devil, Xavier: Renegade Angel, and Saul of the Mole Men.

=== Teletoon at Night (2009–2019) ===
On September 7, 2009, the block was rebranded as Teletoon at Night on weeknights. While several Adult Swim originals (such as Robot Chicken, Moral Orel, and The Venture Bros.) continued to be shown, the neutrally-toned rebranding was versatility, attempting to better appeal to wider majorities within the 18–34 group who "appreciated clever, culturally-topical comedy".

The Detour branding remained on weekends until 2010, including reruns of originals such as Clone High, Tripping the Rift, Bromwell High, and Sons of Butcher.

During this time, Teletoon at Night began to rely more heavily on major prime-time series (such as American Dad! and Futurama), which consistently proved to target a more broad selection of viewers than the more mature Adult Swim originals. Teletoon also acquired the rights to broadcast King of the Hill for the rebrand, with the return of Family Guy on the block in 2011.

Other new additions throughout 2010 included Archer and The Dating Guy, as well as the appointment of Fred Kennedy as host of Fred at Night, whose segments alternated with programs on the Sunday night lineup.

New additions in 2011 included Crash Canyon and Apollo's Pad. In 2012, Fugget About It premiered.

With the launch of the Canadian version of Adult Swim (via the Canadian version of Cartoon Network) on July 4, 2012, most of the original programming from the American service eventually moved to its Canadian counterpart.

In mid-2014, Saturday film telecasts were branded as the "Saturday Night Funhouse Double Feature". Meanwhile, Teletoon acquired broadcast rights to The Awesomes, a Hulu original series. In October 2014, Bento Box Entertainment, the studio that produced The Awesomes, announced they would be producing a new slate of shows for Teletoon at Night. In the same month, Blue Ant Media, Mondo Media, and Corus announced that Teletoon at Night would air a new series featuring shorts from Bite on Mondo, a program in which content creators pitched ideas for several television series. It was later announced on Adult Swim's Facebook page that the series Night Sweats, originally stated to air on Teletoon at Night, would air on Adult Swim instead.

During the week of September 1, 2015, it was announced on air that, on that date, several of the block's shows would move to Adult Swim. In a press release on September 3, 2015, it was announced that the block would air on Mondays through Thursdays starting at 10:00 p.m, with a film at 11:00 p.m. Teletoon's Superfan Friday block expanded in Teletoon at Night's place. It was later announced in December 2015, that starting on January 4, 2016, Teletoon at Night would be adding more films to their schedule with more of their shows moving to Adult Swim.

In February 2016, several television series that were airing on Adult Swim began airing on Teletoon at Night. On February 24, 2016, it was announced in a press release that the seventh season of Archer would air on both blocks. In the same month, Teletoon at Night's website stated that its Fred at Night segment would be discontinued after six years, with the final installment airing on February 25, 2016. On March 23, 2016, it was announced that Archer's seventh season would instead air on Teletoon at Night, although the season premiere aired as a simulcast on Adult Swim.

On March 4, 2019, along with the announcement that Action would relaunch as a full-time Adult Swim channel on April 1, 2019, it was also announced that Teletoon at Night would be discontinued. The block ended on April 1, 2019, at 3:00 a.m.

== Programming ==
=== Original series ===
| Title | Premiere date | End date | Reruns | Note(s) |
|---|---|---|---|---|
| Apollo's Pad | April 10, 2011 | 2011 | 2011 | |
| Bromwell High | February 1, 2005 | April 26, 2005 | 2005–07; 2009 | UK co-production between Decode and Hat Trick Productions for Channel 4 (Episodes 1–6 (UK order)) and DVD (Region 2) (Episodes 7–13 (UK order)) |
| Clone High | November 2, 2002 | April 13, 2003 | 2003–07; 2009–10 | First season, US co-production between Doozer Productions, Lord Miller Productions, Touchstone Television, Nelvana, and MTV Networks |
| Crash Canyon | September 18, 2011 | March 3, 2013 | 2013–17 | |
| Daft Planet | September 2, 2002 | December 23, 2002 | 2002–04 | |
| The Dating Guy | September 17, 2008 | December 29, 2010 | 2010-2013 | |
| Delta State | September 11, 2004 | February 27, 2005 | 2005–2007 | French-Luxembourger-Indian co-production between Alphanim, Nelvana, Deltanim Productions, DQ Entertainment, Luxanimation, and Cofimage 13 |
| Fugget About It | September 7, 2012 | April 1, 2016 | 2016–2019 | |
| John Callahan's Quads! | February 2, 2001 | October 19, 2002 | 2002–06; 2016–19 | |
| Life's a Zoo | September 1, 2008 | November 8, 2009 | | |
| Night Sweats | February 29, 2016 | 2016 | 2016–2018 | |
| Punch! | January 11, 2008 | 2008 | 2009 | |
| Sons of Butcher | August 5, 2005 | January 12, 2007 | 2007–09; 2012 | |
| Station X | September 3, 2005 | November 20, 2005 | | |
| Undergrads | April 1, 2001 | August 12, 2001 | 2001–04; 2008; 2010–11; 2014 | US co-production between Decode and MTV |

=== Acquired series ===
| Title | Premiere date | Reruns | Note(s) |
|---|---|---|---|
| 12 oz. Mouse | September 1, 2006 | 2006–12 | |
| American Dad! | September 1, 2008 | 2008–2019 | |
| Angry Kid | 2008 | 2008–09 | |
| Aqua Teen Hunger Force | January 4, 2004 | 2004–12 | |
| Archer | October 17, 2010 | 2010–19 | |
| Assy McGee | September 3, 2007 | 2007–12 | |
| The Awesomes | September 4, 2014 | 2014–17 | |
| Axe Cop | | | |
| Bob's Burgers | September 7, 2015 | 2015–19 | |
| Baby Blues | September 8, 2002 | 2002-09 | |
| The Boondocks | February 17, 2006 | 2006-08 | |
| Brickleberry | March 29, 2015 | 2015–18 | |
| The Brak Show | September 12, 2004 | 2004–12 | |
| Captain Star | 1997 | 1997-01 | |
| The Cleveland Show | September 1, 2018 | 2018–2019 | |
| Code Monkeys | September 4, 2008 | 2008–09 | |
| The Critic | September 3, 2008 | 2008–09 | |
| Daft Planet | 2002 | 2002-04 | |
| Family Guy | January 2, 2003 | 2003–2007, 2011-2019 | |
| Father of the Pride | September 5, 2008 | 2008-09 | |
| Frisky Dingo | September 4, 2007 | 2007–12 | |
| Futurama | January 10, 2004 | 2004-2018 | |
| The Grim Adventures of Billy & Mandy | 2002 | 2002-05 | |
| Harvey Birdman, Attorney at Law | March 7, 2003 | 2003–12 | |
| The Head | 1998 | 1998-2002 | |
| Hey Joel | July 2006 | 2006 | |
| Homiez | 2001 | 2001-02 | |
| Home Movies | September 1, 2003 | 2003–12 | |
| King of the Hill | September 7, 2009 | 2009–19 | |
| The Life & Times of Tim | August 2011 | 2011-18 | |
| Lolita Lolita | 1998 | 1998-2001 | |
| Lucas Bros. Moving Co. | October 24, 2016 | 2016 | |
| Lucy, the Daughter of the Devil | September 3, 2008 | 2008–12 | |
| Major Lazer | October 24, 2016 | 2016 | |
| The Maxx | | | |
| Metalocalypse | September 3, 2007 | 2007–12 | |
| Minoriteam | September 6, 2007 | 2007–12 | |
| Mission Hill | 2001 | 2001–05 | |
| Moral Orel | September 4, 2007 | 2007–12 | |
| Napoleon Dynamite | 2011 | 2011-12 | |
| The Oblongs | 2001 | 2001–05 | |
| Perfect Hair Forever | September 5, 2007 | 2007–12 | |
| Pond Life | 1997 | 1997-2002 | |
| The Ren and Stimpy Show | March 4, 1998 | 1998-2004 | |
| Rick and Morty | September 3, 2017 | 2017–19 | |
| Rick & Steve: The Happiest Gay Couple in All the World | 2008 | 2008-09 | |
| The Ripping Friends | 2002 | 2002-04 | |
| Robot Chicken | September 1, 2006 | 2006–19 | |
| Saul of the Mole Men | May 16, 2009 | 2009–12 | |
| Sealab 2021 | September 5, 2007 | 2007–12 | |
| The Simpsons | October 17, 1997 | 1997-99 | |
| The Smoking Gun | September 6, 2007 | 2007 | |
| Space Ghost Coast to Coast | September 1, 2006 | 2006–12 | |
| Spicy City | 2002 | 2002 | |
| Spy Groove | 2001 | 2001-03 | |
| Squidbillies | September 1, 2006 | 2006–12 | |
| Stroker & Hoop | September 1, 2006 | 2006–12 | |
| The Tick | 2001 | 2003 | |
| Tim and Eric Awesome Show, Great Job! | June 1, 2012 | 2012 | |
| Time Squad | 2002 | 2000-04 | |
| Todd McFarlane's Spawn | June 3, 2002 | 2002-04 | |
| Tom Goes to the Mayor | September 1, 2006 | 2006–12 | |
| Mr. Freeman | February 2, 2016 | 2016–19 | |
| Tripping the Rift | August 2006 | 2006-08 | |
| The Venture Bros. | March 13, 2005 | 2005–12; 2014 | |
| The Wrong Coast | | | |
| Xavier: Renegade Angel | May 17, 2009 | 2009–12 | |
