= Adult Swim (Canada) =

Canadian specialty television network

- Country: Canada
- Broadcast area: Nationwide
- Headquarters: Toronto, Ontario

Programming
- Language: English
- Picture format: 1080i HDTV

Ownership
- Owner: Alliance Atlantis (2001–2008); CW Media (2008–2010); Shaw Media (2010–2016); Corus Entertainment (2016–present; branding licensed from Skydance)
- Parent: Showcase Television, Inc.
- Sister channels: Télétoon; Cartoon Network; Boomerang; Showcase; Lifetime

History
- Launched: September 7, 2001; 25 years ago
- Former names: Showcase Action (2001–09); Action (2009–19)

Links
- Website: www.adultswim.ca

Adult Swim is a Canadian English language discretionary specialty channel owned by Showcase Television, Inc., a subsidiary of Corus Entertainment. The channel primarily airs animated and live-action comedies targeting a teenage and young adult audience. Its branding is licensed from the Adult Swim programming block broadcast by Cartoon Network in the United States; it is the first full-time television channel to use the "Adult Swim" brand.

The channel was originally launched in 2001 by Alliance Atlantis as Showcase Action (later known as simply Action), a digital cable spin-off of Showcase focused on action series and films. The channel was re-launched under its current branding on April 1, 2019; it subsumed the Adult Swim block that had aired on the Canadian version of Cartoon Network (now known as Boomerang), and the Teletoon at Night block that had aired on Teletoon (now Cartoon Network).

== History ==
=== As Showcase Action/Action (2001–2019) ===
Showcase Action logo used until 2009

In November 2000, Alliance Atlantis was granted approval by the Canadian Radio-television and Telecommunications Commission (CRTC) for a new category 2 specialty service named "Action Television", which would be devoted to entertainment programming in the action genre. The channel launched on September 7, 2001, as Showcase Action, a spin-off of its analog specialty channel Showcase.

On January 18, 2008, Alliance Atlantis's broadcasting assets were acquired by CW Media, a joint venture between Canwest and Goldman Sachs Alternatives. The channel was renamed Action on August 31, 2009. On October 27, 2010, the channel was acquired by Shaw Media as part of its acquisition of Canwest. By 2011, Action had begun to diverge from its original format, shifting more towards general entertainment and reality shows targeting male audiences.

On May 1, 2015, a high definition feed of Action was launched. In 2016, Shaw Media was acquired by its sister company Corus Entertainment.

=== As Adult Swim (2019–present) ===
Historically, many of Adult Swim's original productions were aired in Canada by Teletoon, as part of its relationship with parent channel Cartoon Network. The programming was aired under its similarly-formatted late-night block Teletoon at Night (formerly The Detour). On July 4, 2012, Teletoon launched a Canadian version of Cartoon Network as a sister channel. Much like its American counterpart, the channel would also offer a version of Adult Swim.

From March 2016 through November 2018, Time Warner had also operated an Adult Swim subscription video on demand service for Android and iOS devices via Adult Swim Games, which streamed some of Adult Swim's original programming in Canada. New episodes were added to the app following their U.S. airings, Originally, Rick and Morty and Robot Chicken premieres were only added after they aired in Canada. Beginning with its third season, new episodes of Rick and Morty were added the next day after their U.S. premiere. In 2017, new episodes from Samurai Jack's fifth season were added two days after they premiered on Adult Swim's Toonami block.

On March 4, 2019, it was announced that Action would be relaunched as a standalone Adult Swim channel on April 1, 2019, marking the first time that the brand would be used for a 24-hour channel. Both the Teletoon at Night and Adult Swim blocks on Teletoon and Cartoon Network were discontinued as part of the channel's launch. The network would launch with a two-month free preview, while full episodes of the channel's programming were made free to watch on-demand until January 2020. Shows announced for the channel's launch included Rick and Morty, Robot Chicken, Tim & Eric's Bedtime Stories, The Eric Andre Show, and Lazor Wulf, the latter of which was announced to premiere day-and-date with the U.S service.

During Corus Entertainment's 2022 upfronts presentation, the company announced its first two original commissions for the Adult Swim channel; Psi Cops, and Red Ketchup (co-commissioned with Télétoon la nuit).

== Programming ==
The channel primarily airs original productions from Adult Swim in the U.S., including adult animation series and live-action comedies. The channel does not offer a Toonami block, but it has aired anime series co-produced or commissioned by Adult Swim for the block, such as Blade Runner: Black Lotus and Housing Complex C. The channel has also acquired original animated series from the sibling HBO Max streaming service (such as Harley Quinn), and off-network reruns of animated sitcoms.

Most of the channel's domestic, first-run programs are English dubs of series commissioned by the French-language Télétoon's late-night block, Télétoon la nuit (including The Bizarre Stories of Professor Zarbi, Doomsday Brothers, and Red Ketchup). In order to fulfill Canadian content requirements, the channel also carries reruns of library content (including original series that had been produced for the Teletoon at Night, Télétoon la nuit, and Canadian Adult Swim blocks), and until December 23, 2024 aired made-for-TV films on Monday mornings (a holdover from Action).

As Showcase Action, the channel initially aired programming within the action genre. By 2011, Action had begun to drift towards airing general entertainment programming targeting a male audience, including acquiring reality shows from the U.S. network TruTV (such as Impractical Jokers). In 2011, Action would begin airing two original comedy programs, The Drunk and On Drugs Happy Funtime Hour and Kenny Hotz's Triumph of the Will, both of which were cancelled after one season. Another original series, But I'm Chris Jericho!, starring Canadian-born professional wrestler Chris Jericho, premiered as a webseries in 2013 on Action's YouTube channel, and was later acquired for a second season by CBC Comedy.
