= List of animated television series of 2016 =

This is a list of animated television series first aired in 2016.

Animated television series to air first in 2016
Title	Seasons	Episodes	Country	Year	Original channel	Technique
Akili and Me	1		Tanzania	2016–present	TBC1; Akili Kids	Flash
Animals	3	30	United States	2016–18	HBO	Traditional/Flash
Anselmo quiere saber	1	10	Uruguay	2016	TNU	Flash
Appa eolil Jeog-en	1	26	South Korea	2016	MBC TV	
Apollo Gauntlet	1	7	United States	2016–17	Adult Swim	Flash
Ask the StoryBots	3	22	United States	2016–19	Netflix	CGI; Live action Flash; Puppet; Stop motion
Astra Force	1	52	India	2016–17	Disney Channel	Flash
Atomic Puppet	1	26	Canada; France	2016–17	Teletoon; France 4 Disney XD (worldwide)	Flash
As Aventuras do Homem Cueca	1	26	Brazil	2016	Band	Flash
B-Boying High	1	26	South Korea	2016–17	MBC TV	Traditional
The Bagel and Becky Show	1	26	Canada	2016–17	Teletoon	Flash
Bal Chanakya			India	2016	Maha Cartoon TV	
Barbie Dreamtopia (shorts)	1	8	United States	2016	YouTube	CGI
The Barefoot Bandits		25	New Zealand	2016	TV2	Flash
Bat Pat	2	104	Italy; Spain	2016–19	Rai Gulp; Clan	Flash
BattleClaw	2	52	China	2016	CCTV-14	
Beat Bugs	3	39	Australia; Canada (seasons 1–2)	2016–18	Netflix; 7TWO	CGI
Ben 10 (2016)	4	178	United States	2016–21	Cartoon Network	Traditional
Bibleman: The Animated Adventures	5	26	United States	2016–20	Smile of a Child	CGI
BoBoiBoy Galaxy	2	40	Malaysia	2016–25	TV3	CGI
Boo Boom: The Long Way Home	1	26	Italy	2016	Rai Gulp	Flash/Traditional
Bordertown	1	13	United States	2016	Fox	Traditional
Boule et Bill	2	104	France	2016	France 3	CGI
Brad Neely's Harg Nallin' Sclopio Peepio	1	10	United States	2016	Adult Swim	Flash
Bunnicula	3	104	United States	2016–18	Cartoon Network, Boomerang	Flash
Caillou's New Adventures	4	120	Canada	2016–present	YouTube	Flash
Camp Camp	5	64	United States	2016–24	RoosterTeeth.com	Flash
Camp WWE	2	10	United States	2016–18	WWE Network	Flash
Capsule Boy	2	52	South Korea	2016–19	KBS1, SBS	CGI
Carrossel	1	26	Brazil	2016	SBT	Flash
Chacha Bhatija	2	195	India	2016–present	Hungama TV	CGI
Chai Chai	1	48	India	2016	Hungama TV	Flash
Chhoti Anandi	1	26	India	2016	Colors TV	Flash
Chimpoo Simpoo	1	52	India	2016–17	ZeeQ	Flash
Chronokids	1	78	France	2016	TFOU	Flash
Ciencia Zapata	2		Argentina	2016–17	Pakapaka	Flash
Ciko se Sikho			India	2016	Maha Cartoon TV	
Closers: Side Blacklambs	1	6	South Korea	2016–19	YouTube	Traditional
Cobot	1	8	South Korea	2016	EBS1	CGI
El Conuco de Elena			Venezuela	2016	ConCiencia TV	Flash
Counterfeit Cat	1	52	Canada, United Kingdom	2016–17	Disney XD (UK), Teletoon (Canada)	Flash
Cracké	2	104	Canada	2016–22	Teletoon	CGI
Cuby Zoo	1	52	South Korea	2016–17	EBS1	CGI
O Desafio do Elmo	1	26	Brazil	2016	TV Cultura, TV Brasil	Flash
The Devil Ring	1	14	China	2016	Tencent Video	
Digby Dragon	2	78	United Kingdom	2016–19	Nick Jr.	CGI
DinoCore	5	65	South Korea	2016–19	Tooniverse	CGI
Dongguo Xiaojie	1	15	China	2016–17	Tencent Video	
Dot.	2	78	Canada, United States	2016–18	Kids' CBC (Canada), Sprout (US)	Flash
Dream Corp LLC	3	28	United States	2016–20	Adult Swim	Rotoscoping/Live action
DreamWorksTV	1	26	Canada	2016	Family Channel, YouTube	Flash/Live action
Dusty & Mop	4	40	Germany	2016–20	KiKa	Stop motion
Eddie is a Yeti	1	26	Italy	2016	Toon Goggles	CGI
Ejen Ali	3	39	Malaysia	2016–23	TV3 (2016–18, 2023–present); Disney+ Hotstar (2022–23)	CGI
Elena of Avalor	3	77	United States	2016–20	Disney Channel, Disney Junior	CGI
Elsword: El Lady	1	12	South Korea	2016–17	YouTube	Traditional
Equipo 009			Cuba	2016–17	Cubavisión	Flash
Everybody Loves a Moose	1	52	Italy, United Kingdom	2016	Rai Gulp	Flash
Fangbone!	1	26	Canada	2016–17	Family Chrgd	Flash
Fantasy Patrol	4	104	Russia	2016–present	Moolt; Moolt in Cinema; YouTube	CGI/Flash
Fire Engine Ray	1	26	South Korea	2016	EBS1	CGI
Floogals	4	170	United Kingdom	2016–20	Sprout	CGI/Live action
Flowering Heart	2	52	South Korea	2016–17	EBS1	Traditional
Freaktown	1	26	Canada	2016	Teletoon	Flash
FrienZoo	1	78	South Korea	2016–17	EBS1	Flash
Full-Time Magister	6	72	China	2016–present	Tencent Video	
Future-Worm!	1	21	United States	2016–18	Disney XD	Flash
Gaju Bhai	2	52	India	2016–18	Disney Channel	Flash
Gamseongaeni Haru	2	28	South Korea	2016–17	KBS1	
George & Paul	1	26	Belgium, Netherlands	2016	NPO 3, Ketnet	Stop motion
Gigglebug	2	52	Finland	2016	Yle TV2	Traditional
Girls Dorm	3	25	China	2016–18	iQIYI, LeTV, Mango TV, Sohu Video, Tencent Video, Youku	
GoGo Dino	8	194	China, South Korea	2016–present	SBS, EBS	CGI
Gorollas	1	14	South Korea	2016	SBS TV	CGI
Great King of the Grave	4	87	China	2016–19	Tencent Video	CGI
Greatest Party Story Ever	2	20	United States	2016	MTV	Traditional/Flash/Stop motion/Live action
Grizzy & the Lemmings	4	104	France	2016–present	France 3, Boomerang, Cartoon Network, Cartoonito	CGI
Gummibär & Friends: The Gummy Bear Show	2	78	India; Germany	2016–22	YouTube	CGI
The Happos Family	1	20	United Kingdom; France; Italy	2016–18	Boomerang; Cartoonito	CGI
HarmonQuest	3	30	United States	2016–19	Seeso, VRV	Flash/Live action
Harry & Bunnie	1	78	Malaysia	2016	Disney Channel	Flash
The Haunted House	5	123	South Korea	2016–24	Tooniverse	Traditional
Hello! Pawmily	2	26	South Korea	2016–18	KBS2, KBS1	
Home: Adventures with Tip & Oh	4	52	United States	2016–18	Netflix	Flash
Hot Streets	2	20	United States	2016–19	Adult Swim	Flash
Hullabalooba	1	13	Finland	2016	Yle TV2	
Inui	2	52	Germany	2016–18	KiKa	
Jabu's Jungle	4	52	South Africa	2016	Gulli Africa	Flash
Jerry and the Raiders	1	26	Canada	2016–17	TVOKids	CGI
Julio Bunny	1	52	Italy	2016	Nick Jr.	
Junior on the Job	2	10	Brazil	2016–17	PlayKids	Flash
Justice League Action	1	52	United States	2016–18	Cartoon Network	Traditional
Katuri	5	156	South Korea	2016–present	EBS1	CGI
Kazoops!	3	78	Australia, Malaysia, United Kingdom	2016	ABC Kids (Australia), CBeebies (UK), Netflix	CGI
Kiko	2	103	Indonesia	2016–18	RCTI	CGI
King Şakir	7	254	Turkey	2016–present	Cartoon Network	Flash
Kiva Can Do!	1	52	Ireland	2016	RTÉjr	Flash
Kong: King of the Apes	2	23	Canada, Japan, United States	2016–18	Netflix	CGI
Kulipari	3	26	United States, Ireland	2016–24	Netflix, Hulu	Flash
Lamput	4	147	India	2016–present	Cartoon Network	Flash
Lastman	2	32	France	2016–22	France 4	
Legends of Chamberlain Heights	2	20	United States	2016–17	Comedy Central	Flash
Lego Bionicle: The Journey to One	1	5	Canada, Denmark	2016	Netflix	CGI
Lego Friends: The Power of Friendship	2	4	Denmark	2016	Netflix	CGI
Lego Star Wars: The Freemaker Adventures	2	26	United States	2016–17	Disney XD	CGI
Lego Star Wars: The Resistance Rises	1	5	United States	2016	Disney XD	CGI
Leo & Tig	3	78	Russia	2016–present	Moolt in Cinema, Moolt, Tlum HD	CGI
Lexi & Lottie: Trusty Twin Detectives	1	26	Australia	2016–17	Eleven	Flash
The Lion Guard	3	74	United States	2016–19	Disney Junior	Flash/Toon Boom
The Little Farmer Rabby	1	52	South Korea	2016–18	KBS2, KBS1	CGI
Little Furry	2	117	Belgium, France	2016–21	Ouftivi	Flash
Little People	2	52	Canada, United States	2016–18	Family Jr.	CGI
Little Roy	2	52	Ireland	2016–17	CBBC, CBeebies	Traditional/Flash/Live action
Looi	2	26	United States, Germany	2016	BabyFirst	CGI
Looped	1	26	Canada	2016	Teletoon	Flash
The Loud House	9	291	United States	2016–present	Nickelodeon	Toon Boom (seasons 1–3); Flash (season 4 onwards)
Luna Petunia	5	33	Canada, United States	2016–18	Netflix	CGI
Mac & Izzy	1	10	United Kingdom, United States	2016–17	YouTube	CGI
Mack & Moxy	1	12	United States	2016	PBS Kids	CGI/Live action
Maddie's Do You Know?	5	98	United Kingdom	2016–21	CBeebies	Live action/Flash
Magic Adventures: The Crystal of Dark	1	52	South Korea	2016–17	KBS1	CGI
Mighty Magiswords	2	92	United States	2016–19	Cartoon Network	Flash
The Mike Nolan Show	1	5	Australia	2016	Comedy Central	
Milo Murphy's Law	2	40	United States	2016–19	Disney XD, Disney Channel	Traditional
Mini Pet Pals	3	156	Italy	2016	Rai Yoyo	Flash
Mirette Investigates	1	52	France, Spain	2016–17	TF1	Flash
Misho & Robin	2	52	Croatia	2016–21	HRT 3	Flash
Miss Moon	1	52	France	2016–17	TFOU	Flash
Modoo Modoo Show	1	26	South Korea	2016	MBC TV	CGI
Mooshak Gungun			India	2016	Maha Cartoon TV	CGI
Mrazivá tajemství	3	20	Czech Republic	2016–18	Seznam.cz	CGI
Munki and Trunk	4	60	South Africa, United Kingdom	2016–present	Nickelodeon	CGI
My Friend Macada	1	26	South Korea	2016–17	MBC TV	
My Knight and Me	1	52	Belgium, France	2016–17	Ouftivi (Belgium), Télétoon+ (France)	CGI
Nine Songs of the Moving Heavens	2	90	China	2016–19	Tencent Video, iQIYI, LeTV, Mango TV, Sohu Video, Youku	CGI
Noddy, Toyland Detective	2	107	France, United States	2016–20	France 5	CGI
Origanimals		52	Malaysia	2016	ZooMoo	CGI
P. King Duckling	2	78	China, United States	2016–17	Disney Junior	Flash
Pacific Heat	1	13	Australia	2016–17	The Comedy Channel	Flash
Panchatantra Stories			India	2016	Maha Cartoon TV	
Panda and Little Mole	1	52	China, Czech Republic	2016	CCTV-14	CGI
Papa Dog	3	58	South Korea	2016–19	KBS2	
Paranormal Action Squad	1	8	United States	2016	YouTube Premium	Flash
Party Legends	2	14	United States	2016–17	Viceland	Flash/Live action
Pikkuli	1	26	Finland	2016	Yle TV2	
PINY: Institute of New York	1	52	Spain	2016–20	Disney Channel	Flash
Pirata & Capitano	2	104	France, Spain	2016–present	France 5	CGI
Playback	1	20	China	2016–17	Tencent Video	CGI
Power Battle Watch Car	2	52	South Korea	2016	MBC	CGI
The Powerpuff Girls (2016)	3	119	United States	2016–19	Cartoon Network	Traditional
Prisoner Zero	1	26	Australia; United Kingdom; Ireland	2016	ABC3	Traditional
Rainbow Ruby	2	52	South Korea; Canada; China	2016–20	Family Jr. EBS1; CCTV-14	CGI
Rakshasa Street	3	52	China	2016–present	Youku; Bilibili	Traditional
Ranger Rob	3	66	Canada; United Kingdom (season 1)	2016–21	Treehouse TV/Ici Radio-Canada Télé; Tiny Pop	CGI
Raven the Little Rascal	2	52	Germany	2016–17	KiKa	
Ready Jet Go!	2	67	United States	2016–23	PBS Kids	CGI
Regal Academy	2	52	Italy	2016–18	Rai Yoyo	CGI/Flash
Rico & Oskar		18	Germany	2016	Das Erste	
Right Now Kapow	1	26	United States	2016–17	Disney XD	Flash
Rolling with the Ronks!	1	52	France	2016–17	Disney Channel, France 3	Traditional/Flash
Rusty Rivets (Note: The series was first shown in 2016 in the United States. Then it premiered in Canada in 2017.)	3	78	Canada	2016–20	Nickelodeon, Treehouse TV	CGI
RWBY Chibi	4	74	United States	2016–21	RoosterTeeth.com	CGI
Sayed Android	1	30	Egypt	2016		CGI
Seven & Me	2	52	France, Italy	2016	France 3	CGI/Live action
Shutterbugs	1	26	Canada, Singapore	2016	TVOKids, Knowledge Kids, Radio-Canada	Flash
Siesta Z	2	40	Argentina, Colombia, Ecuador	2016	Pakapaka, Señal Colombia, Ecuador TV	Flash
Simon	5	208	France	2016–present	France 5	Flash
Sindbad & the 7 Galaxies	1	26	United Kingdom	2016	Discovery Kids	CGI
Skylanders Academy	3	38	United States, France	2016–18	Netflix	CGI
SofyRuby	2	104	South Korea	2016–18	EBS1, SBS	CGI
Son of Zorn	1	13	United States	2016–17	Fox	Flash/Live action
Splash and Bubbles	1	40	United States	2016–18	PBS Kids	CGI
Spot Bots	1	26	United Kingdom	2016	CBeebies	CGI/Live action
StarStarSpace	3	36	Germany	2016–20	Funk, YouTube	
Steel Fire Brigade Fire Robo	1	26	South Korea	2016–17	EBS	CGI
The Stinky & Dirty Show	2	39	Ireland, United States	2016–19	Amazon Prime Video	CGI
StoryBots Super Songs	1	5	United States	2016	Netflix	Flash/Live action
Suspicious Owl	9	170	Russia	2016–24	2×2	
Talking Tom & Friends Minis	1	59	Slovenia; South Korea	2016–18	YouTube	Flash
Telemonster	1	52	South Korea	2016–17	MBC TV	CGI
Tilda Appleseed	2	26	Germany	2016–17	KiKa	
Tobot Athlon	3	29	South Korea	2016–17		CGI
Transformers: Combiner Wars	1	8	United States	2016	go90	CGI
Treasure Island	1	26	Italy	2016	Rai Gulp	CGI
The Treflik Family	6	78	Poland	2016–21	TVP ABC	Stop motion
Trollhunters: Tales of Arcadia	3	52	United States	2016–18	Netflix	CGI
Tu mourras moins bête...	4	130	France	2016–20	Arte	Traditional
Tumble Tots Fun Adventures	1	11	United Kingdom	2016–19	Amazon Prime Video	CGI
Twin Spirit Detectives	1	20	China	2016–17	Tencent Video	
Os Under-Undergrounds	2	52	Brazil	2016–21	Nickelodeon	Flash
V 4 Viraat	2	59	India	2016	Disney Channel	Flash
Valt the Wonder Deer	4	208	China	2016–23	Tencent Video; Propeller TV (United Kingdom)	Flash
¡Vientos! Noticias que vuelan		475	Mexico	2016–present	Canal 22	Live action/Flash
Voltron: Legendary Defender	8	78	United States	2016–18	Netflix	Traditional
WellieWishers	2	26	United States; Netherlands	2016–17	Amazon Prime Video	Flash
The Wild Adventures of Blinky Bill	1	26	Australia	2016–17	7TWO; ABC ME	CGI
Winston Steinburger and Sir Dudley Ding Dong	1	26	Canada; Australia	2016	ABC Me (2016); Teletoon (2017)	Flash
Word Party	5	60	United States	2016–21	Netflix	CGI
World of Winx	2	26	Italy	2016–17	Netflix	Flash
Wu Geng Ji	4	156	China	2016–present	Tencent Video	CGI
Yoko	3	78	Russia; Spain	2016–20	Carousel; Clan/ETB 3	CGI
Zak Storm	1	39	France; South Korea; United States; Indonesia; Italy	2016–18	Gulli; Canal J	CGI
The ZhuZhus	1	26	Canada; United States	2016–17	Disney Channel; YTV	Flash
Zig and Zag	1	26	United Kingdom; Ireland	2016	CBBC; RTÉjr	Flash

== See also ==
- 2016 in anime
- 2016 in animation
- List of animated feature films of 2016
