= 2016 in animation =

2016 in animation is an overview of notable events, including notable awards, list of films released, television show debuts and endings, and notable deaths.

== Events ==
=== January ===
- January 15: The tenth & final season of The Fairly OddParents begins on Nickelodeon with the premiere of the half-hour special "The Big Fairy Share Scare!", which introduces the show's new main character Chole Carmichael.
- January 18: Season 2 of Clarence begins on Cartoon Network with the premiere of the episodes "The Interrogation" and "Lost Playground".
- January 25: Season 13 of American Dad! begins on TBS with the premiere of the episode "Roots". The season's premiere was seen by over 1 million viewers that night.

=== February ===
- February 2: The 14th The Land Before Time film Journey of the Brave is released after a nine-year gap from The Wisdom of Friends in 2007 as Universal Animation Studios would conclude the franchise afterwards.
- February 6: 43rd Annie Awards
- February 15: The final episode of Gravity Falls and the third & final part in the "Weirdmaggedon" arc, titled "Take Back the Falls", premiered on Disney XD to universal acclaim.
- February 28: 88th Academy Awards:
  - Inside Out by Pete Docter and Jonas Rivera wins the Academy Award for Best Animated Feature.
  - Bear Story by Pato Escala Pierart and Gabriel Osorio Vargas wins the Academy Award for Best Animated Short Film.

=== March ===
- March 4:
  - Zootopia is released by Walt Disney Studios.
  - Disney XD greenlights two new animated shows for its network, Country Club & Billy Dilly's Super-Duper Subterranean Summer.
- March 31: HIT Entertainment Absorbed into Mattel Creations, name currently used for licensing purposes only.

=== April ===
- April 4: The first episode of The Powerpuff Girls reboot premieres to mixed-to-negative reviews.
- April 11: The Powerpuff Girls episode "Bye Bye, Bellum" airs. This marks the confirmed removal of Sara Bellum, which angered fans of the original 1998 series.

=== May ===
- May 2: The first episode of The Loud House airs.
- May 20: The Angry Birds Movie is released.
- May 22:
  - The Simpsons concludes its 27th season on Fox with the episode "Orange Is the New Yellow". The season's finale was seen by over 3.2 million viewers that night.
  - Family Guy concludes its 14th season on Fox with the episode "Road to India", featuring the following Indian guest stars: Barkhad Abdi, Aseem Batra, Jay Chandrasekhar, Anil Kapoor (as himself), Dan Nainan, Russell Peters, Sendhil Ramamurthy, Sheetal Sheth. The season's finale was seen by nearly 2.6 million viewers that night.
  - Bob's Burgers concludes its sixth season on Fox with the episode "Glued, Where's My Bob?", featuring the following guest stars: Rob Huebel, Kumail Nanjiani, and Keegan-Michael Key. The season's finale was seen by over 2 million viewers that night.

=== June ===
- June 10: Camp Camp premieres on Rooster Teeth.
- June 11: The final episode of the original BoBoiBoy series.
- June 15: Rock Dog premieres at the Shanghai International Film Festival, followed by its Chinese theatrical run in July.
- June 27: American Dad! concludes its 13th season on TBS with the episode "Standard Deviation". The season's finale was watched by only 984 thousand viewers that night, marking a new low in the show's viewership.
- June 30: The Teen Titans Go! episode "TTG v PPG" premieres on Cartoon Network, it is a crossover with The Powerpuff Girls (2016).

=== July ===
- July 8: Illumination's The Secret Life of Pets was released.
- July 11: Season 2 of Star vs. the Forces of Evil begins on Disney XD with the premiere of the episodes "My New Wand!/Ludo in the Wild"
- July 20: The Haunted House debuts on Tooniverse in South Korea.

=== August ===
- August 1–5: The five-part Teen Titans Go! mini-series titled "Island Adventures" airs on Cartoon Network.
- August 9: The Scooby-Doo direct-to-video film Scooby-Doo! and WWE: Curse of the Speed Demon releases on DVD, Blu-ray, & Digital HD. The movie is a direct sequel to the 2014 film Scooby-Doo! WrestleMania Mystery.
- August 12: Sausage Party is released as the first full-length computer-animated feature film to be rated R.

=== September ===
- September 1: Season 5 of The Amazing World of Gumball begins on Cartoon Network (despite it still being in its fourth season), with the premiere of the episode "The Stories".
- September 14: Season 20 of South Park begins on Comedy Central with the premiere of the episode "Member Berries".
- September 23: Storks by Nicholas Stoller and Doug Sweetland premieres.
- September 25:
  - Season 7 of Bob's Burgers begins on Fox with the premiere of the episode "Flu-ouise". The season's premiere was seen by exactly 2.6 million viewers that night.
  - Season 28 of The Simpsons begins on Fox with the premiere of the episode "Monty Burns' Fleeing Circus", guest starring Adventure Time creator Pendleton Ward. The season's premiere was seen by over 3.3 million viewers that night.
  - Season 15 of Family Guy begins on Fox with the premiere of the episode "The Boys in the Band". The season's premiere was seen by 2.8 million viewers that night.
    - Amy Schumer guest stars in all 3 episodes.
- September 26: The eighth & final season of Regular Show begins on Cartoon Network with the premiere of the episodes "One Space Day at a Time" and "Cool Bro Bots". The season's premiere was seen by over 1.1 million viewers that night.

=== October ===
- October 1: The series finale of Mixels, "Nixel, Nixel Go Away", premieres on Cartoon Network.
- October 3: Milo Murphy's Law (a spin-off of Phineas and Ferb) premieres on Disney XD.
- October 10: The first episode of Grizzy & the Lemmings airs.
- October 12: 2016 becomes the first year where two animated films gross over $1 billion: Zootopia and Finding Dory.
- October 13: Teen Titans Go! concludes its third season on Cartoon Network with the episode "The Cape", which is a redubbed version of the Teen Titans episode "Divide and Conquer".
- October 16: The Simpsons' "Treehouse of Horror XXVII" premieres on Fox, this is also the show's 600th episode.
- October 17: Steve Cutts's animated music video set to Moby's Are You Lost In The World Like Me? is released.
- October 20: Season 4 of Teen Titans Go! begins on Cartoon Network with the premiere of the episode "Shrimps and Prime Rib".
- October 27: The Amazing World of Gumball concludes its fourth season on Cartoon Network.

=== November ===
- November 4: Dreamworks Animation releases Trolls.
- November 7: Season 14 of American Dad! begins on TBS with the premiere of the episode "Father's Daze". The season's premiere was seen by exactly 1 million viewers that night.
- November 8: The Loud House concludes its first season on Nickelodeon with the episode "Snow Bored". The season's finale was seen by over 1.7 million viewers that night.
- November 9: Season 2 of The Loud House begins on Nickelodeon with the premiere of the episode "Intern for the Worse". The season's premiere was seen by 1.7 million viewers that night.
- November 23: Moana by Walt Disney Animation Studios is released.

=== December ===
- December 7: South Park concludes its 20th season on Comedy Central with the episode "The End of Serialization as We Know It". It was seen by over 1.8 million viewers that night.
- December 14: The Lion King and Who Framed Roger Rabbit are added to the National Film Registry.

== Awards ==
- Academy Award for Best Animated Feature: Inside Out
- Academy Award for Best Animated Short Film: Bear Story
- Annecy International Animated Film Festival Cristal du long métrage: My Life as a Zucchini
- Annie Award for Best Animated Feature: Zootopia
- Asia Pacific Screen Award for Best Animated Feature Film: Seoul Station
- BAFTA Award for Best Animated Film: Kubo and the Two Strings
- César Award for Best Animated Film: The Little Prince
- European Film Award for Best Animated Film: My Life as a Zucchini
- Golden Globe Award for Best Animated Feature Film: Zootopia
- Goya Award for Best Animated Film: Birdboy: The Forgotten Children
- Japan Academy Prize for Animation of the Year: The Boy and the Beast
- Mainichi Film Awards - Animation Grand Award: Your Name

== Television series debuts ==
Date	Title	Channel	Year
January 3	Bordertown	Fox	2016
January 14	Greatest Party Story Ever	MTV	2016
February 5	Mack & Moxy	PBS Kids	2016
February 5	Animals	HBO	2016–2018
February 6	Bunnicula	Cartoon Network, Boomerang	2016–2018
February 15	Ready Jet Go!	PBS Kids	2016–2019
February 15	Lego Star Wars: The Resistance Rises	Disney XD	2016
February 20	Pokémon the Series: XYZ	Cartoon Network	2016–2017
March 2	Looped	Teletoon	2016–2019
March 4	Lego Bionicle: The Journey to One	Netflix	2016
March 7	Little People	Universal Kids	2016–2018
March 26	Fangbone!	Disney XD	2016–2017
April 4	The Powerpuff Girls	Cartoon Network	2016–2019
April 4	Beyblade Burst	Disney XD	2016–2017
April 15	Kong: King of the Apes	Netflix	2016–2018
May 2	The Loud House	Nickelodeon	2016–present
May 12	Counterfeit Cat	Disney XD	2016–2017
May 20	Harry & Bunnie	Disney Channel	2016
June 10	Voltron: Legendary Defender	Netflix	2016–2018
June 20	Lego Star Wars: The Freemaker Adventures	Disney XD	2016–2017
June 20	Freaktown	Teletoon	2016
July 8	Word Party	Netflix	2016–2021
July 10	Brad Neely's Harg Nallin' Sclopio Peepio	Adult Swim	2016
July 18	Atomic Puppet	Disney XD, Teletoon	2016–2017
July 22	Elena of Avalor	Disney Channel, Disney Junior	2016–2020
July 29	Home: Adventures with Tip & Oh	Netflix	2016–2018
August 12	Ask the StoryBots	Netflix	2016–2019
August 13	Regal Academy	Nickelodeon, Rai	2016–2018
August 19	Bottersnikes and Gumbles	Netflix	2016–2017
September 2	Kulipari	Netflix	2016–2018
September 2	Kazoops!	Netflix	2016–2017
September 2	The Stinky & Dirty Show	Amazon Prime Video	2016–2019
September 5	Ranger Rob	Treehouse TV	2016–2021
September 6	Dot.	Universal Kids, CBC	2016–2018
September 11	Son of Zorn	Fox	2016–2017
September 12	The ZhuZhus	Disney Channel	2016–2017
September 14	Legends of Chamberlain Heights	Comedy Central	2016–2017
September 19	Right Now Kapow	Disney XD	2016–2017
October 3	Milo Murphy's Law	Disney XD, Disney Channel	2016–2019
October 28	Skylanders Academy	Netflix	2016–2018
November 4	World of Winx	Netflix	2016–2017
November 7	P. King Duckling	Disney Junior	2016–present
November 8	Rusty Rivets	Nick Jr.	2016–2020
November 23	Splash and Bubbles	PBS Kids	2016–2018
December 8	Clash-A-Rama: The Series	YouTube	2016–2019
December 9	Luna Petunia	Netflix	2016–2018
December 16	Justice League Action	Cartoon Network	2016–2018
December 23	Trollhunters: Tales of Arcadia	Netflix	2016–2018

== Television series endings ==
Date	Title	Channel	Year	Notes
January 22	Fresh Beat Band of Spies	Nick Jr.	2015–2016	Cancelled
February 5	Care Bears and Cousins	Netflix	2015–2016	Cancelled
February 6	Turbo FAST	Netflix	2013–2016	Ended
February 15	Gravity Falls	Disney XD	2012–2016	Ended
February 26	Chick Figures	Mondo Media, YouTube	2015–2016	Cancelled
March 11	Angry Birds Stella	Toons.TV	2014-2016	Ended
March 16	Eddsworld	Newgrounds, YouTube	2003–2016, 2020–present	Ended, until revived in 2020.
April 22	Mack & Moxy	PBS Kids	2016	Ended
May 4	Lego Star Wars: The Resistance Rises	Disney XD	2016	Ended
May 12	Super Why!	PBS Kids	2007–2016	Ended
May 13	Angry Birds Toons	Toons.tv	2013–2016	Ended
May 22	Bordertown	Fox	2016	Ended
June 4	Littlest Pet Shop	Discovery Family	2012–2016	Ended
June 27	Wander Over Yonder	Disney XD	2013–2016	Ended
June 29	Kung Fu Panda: Legends of Awesomeness	Nicktoons	2011–2016	Ended
July 29	Sanjay and Craig	Nickelodeon	2013–2016	Ended
July 29	Lego Bionicle: The Journey to One	Netflix	2016	Ended
August 5	Ever After High	YouTube, Netflix	2013–2016	Ended
August 14	Little Charmers	Nickelodeon, Nick Jr.	2015–2016	Ended
August 23	TripTank	Comedy Central	2014–2016	Ended
September 12	Breadwinners	Nicktoons	2014–2016	Ended
September 18	Brad Neely's Harg Nallin' Sclopio Peepio	Adult Swim	2016	Ended
September 23	VeggieTales in the House	Netflix	2014–2016	Ended
October 1	Mixels	Cartoon Network	2014–2016	Cancelled
October 21	Bubble Guppies	Nick Jr.	2011–2016, 2019–2023	Cancelled, until revived in 2019.
October 22	Transformers: Rescue Bots	Discovery Family	2012–2016	Ended
October 24	The Garfield Show	Boomerang	2009–2016	Ended
November 5	The 7D	Disney XD	2014–2016	Cancelled
November 6	Mickey Mouse Clubhouse	Disney Junior	2006–2016	Ended
November 6	Jake and the Never Land Pirates	Disney Junior	2011–2016	Ended
November 18	Vixen	CW Seed	2015–2016	Cancelled
November 18	Watch My Chops!	Gulli	2003–2016	Cancelled
November 19	Popples	Netflix	2015–2016	Cancelled
December 22	Happy Tree Friends	Mondo Media, YouTube	1999–2016	Ended
December 22	Greatest Party Story Ever	MTV	2016	Cancelled

== Television season premieres ==
Date	Title	Season	Channel
January 15	The Fairly OddParents	10	Nickelodeon
January 18	Clarence	2	Cartoon Network
January 25	American Dad!	13	TBS
February 25	We Bare Bears	2	Cartoon Network
March 26	Adventure Time	8	Cartoon Network
May 12	Steven Universe	3	Cartoon Network
June 13	Harvey Beaks	2	Nickelodeon
July 1	Uncle Grandpa	4	Cartoon Network
July 11	Star vs. the Forces of Evil	2	Disney XD
August 11	Steven Universe	4	Cartoon Network
September 5	The Amazing World of Gumball	5	Cartoon Network
September 25	Bob's Burgers	7	Fox
September 25	Family Guy	15	Fox
September 25	The Simpsons	28	Fox
September 26	Regular Show	8	Cartoon Network
October 15	SpongeBob SquarePants	10	Nickelodeon
October 20	Teen Titans Go!	4	Cartoon Network
October 21	Descendants: Wicked World	2	Disney Channel
November 7	American Dad!	14	TBS
November 9	The Loud House	2	Nickelodeon
December 16	Uncle Grandpa	5	Cartoon Network

== Television season finales ==
Date	Title	Season	Channel
January 8	Steven Universe	2	Cartoon Network
February 11	We Bare Bears	1	Cartoon Network
March 19	Adventure Time	7	Cartoon Network
May 22	Bob's Burgers	6	Fox
May 22	Family Guy	14	Fox
May 22	The Simpsons	27	Fox
June 10	Harvey Beaks	1	Nickelodeon
June 27	American Dad!	13	TBS
June 30	Regular Show	7	Cartoon Network
July 1	Uncle Grandpa	3	Cartoon Network
July 15	Descendants: Wicked World	1	Disney Channel
July 29	Mickey Mouse	3	Disney Channel
August 10	Steven Universe	3	Cartoon Network
October 10	Pickle and Peanut	1	Disney XD
October 13	Teen Titans Go!	3	Cartoon Network
October 27	The Amazing World of Gumball	4	Cartoon Network
November 8	The Loud House	1	Nickelodeon
December 15	Uncle Grandpa	4	Cartoon Network
December 24	The Powerpuff Girls (2016)	1	Cartoon Network

== Deaths ==
=== January ===
- January 4:
  - Frank Armitage, Australian-American painter and muralist (Walt Disney Animation Studios), dies at age 91.
  - Robert Balser, American animator, producer and director (animation director on Yellow Submarine and Heavy Metal, The Triplets), dies at age 88.
- January 5: Christine Lawrence Finney, American painter and animator (Walt Disney Animation Studios), dies at age 47.
- January 6: Pat Harrington Jr., American actor (voice of Ray Palmer/Atom and Roy Harper/Speedy in The Superman/Aquaman Hour of Adventure, the title character and Deux-Deux in The Inspector shorts, Moe Howard in The New Scooby-Doo Movies, Jon's father in A Garfield Christmas), dies at age 86.
- January 7: Richard Libertini, American actor (voice of Dijon in the DuckTales franchise, Wally Llama in the Animaniacs episode "Wally Llama", Tellyrand in the Pinky and the Brain episode "Napoleon Brainaparte", Mr. Marini in the Life With Louie episode "Mr. Anderson's Opus", Commissioner in The Real Adventures of Jonny Quest episode "Bloodlines", Information Desk Clerk in the Duckman episode "Das Sub", Ragtag in the Static Shock episode "Power Play", Dr. Myrell in The Zeta Project episode "The Wrong Morph", Apple Merchant in The Greatest Adventure: Stories from the Bible episode "The Creation"), dies at age 82.
- January 10: David Bowie, English rock singer and actor (voice of Emperor Maltazard in Arthur and the Invisibles, Lord Royal Highness in the SpongeBob SquarePants episode "SpongeBob's Atlantis SquarePantis"), dies at age 69.
- January 13: Brian Bedford, English actor (voice of the title character in Robin Hood), dies at age 80.
- January 14:
  - J.R. Horne, American actor (voice of Stan of the Swamp in Wallykazam!, additional voices in Courage the Cowardly Dog), dies at age 72.
  - Alan Rickman, English actor and director (voice of Joe in Help! I'm a Fish, Absolem in Alice in Wonderland and Alice Through the Looking Glass, King Philip in the King of the Hill episode "Joust Like a Woman"), dies from cancer at age 69.
- January 19: Mike Docherty, Scottish comics artist and animator, dies at age 60.
- January 26:
  - Martin Lavut, Canadian actor (voice of Wheez Weezel in The Devil and Daniel Mouse, Magic Mirror in Intergalactic Thanksgiving, Ard in Heavy Metal, Mylar in Rock & Rule, Mr. Settergren in Pippi Longstocking), dies at age 81.
  - Abe Vigoda, American actor (voice of Sal Valestra in Batman: Mask of the Phantasm, himself in the Family Guy episode "The Kiss Seen Around the World"), dies at age 94.
- January 27: William E. Martin, American actor (voice of Rock Man in The Point!, Nightmare King in Little Nemo: Adventures in Slumberland, Shredder in seasons 8 and 10 of Teenage Mutant Ninja Turtles, Samhain in The Real Ghostbusters), dies at age 70.

=== February ===
- February 3: Joe Alaskey, American actor (voice of Plucky Duck in Tiny Toon Adventures, Uncle Stinky in Casper, Baby Huey in The Baby Huey Show, Principal Smelling in Codename: Kids Next Door, Soda Vendbot and Newspaper Vendbot in Buzz Lightyear of Star Command, Little Jimmy in Timon & Pumbaa, Jean Paul, Piney and Platypus in Johnny Bravo, Officer Wembly in Scooby-Doo and the Cyber Chase, Hunter and Nuk in Balto II: Wolf Quest, The Sheriff in Back to the Future, Ivan, Storeowner #3 and Eyedrop Salesman in My Life as a Teenage Robot, continued voice of Bugs Bunny, Daffy Duck, Droopy, and Grandpa Lou in Rugrats, announcer for Toon Disney, Additional voices in Where's Wally?, Tom & Jerry Kids, Duck Dodgers and The Garfield Show), dies at age 63.
- February 6: Dan Gerson, American voice actor (voice of Needleman and Smitty in Monsters, Inc., Desk Sergeant in Big Hero 6, additional voices in Monsters University) and screenwriter (Duckman, Pixar, Walt Disney Animation Studios), dies at age 49.
- February 7: John Walker, American animator and director (Hanna-Barbera), dies at an unknown age.
- February 23: Antanas Janauskas, Lithuanian film director, designer and writer, dies at age 78.
- February 24: Colin Low, Canadian film director and producer (The Romance of Transportation in Canada), dies at age 89.
- February 25: Zdeněk Smetana, Czech animator, film director and graphic artist (worked for Jiri Trnka, Gene Deitch, The End of A Cube), dies at age 90.
- February 28: George Kennedy, American actor (voice of L.B. Mammoth in Cats Don't Dance), dies at age 91.

=== March ===
- March 1: Michi Kobi, American actress (additional voices in Courage the Cowardly Dog), dies at age 91.
- March 16: Frank Sinatra Jr., American singer, songwriter, actor and conductor (voiced himself in the Family Guy episodes "Brian Sings and Swings", "Tales of a Third Grade Nothing" and "Bookie of the Year"), dies from cardiac arrest at age 72.
- March 17: Larry Drake, American actor and comedian (voice of Pops in Johnny Bravo, Ganthet in Green Lantern: First Flight, Jackson Chappell in the Batman Beyond episode "The Winning Edge", Colonel Vox in the Justice League episode "Maid of Honor", Moss Meister in the What's New, Scooby-Doo? episode "Recipe for Disaster"), dies at age 67.
- March 24: Garry Shandling, American actor and comedian (voice of Verne in Over the Hedge, Ikki in The Jungle Book, Garry in the Dr. Katz, Professional Therapist episode "Sticky Notes", Captain Pat Lewellen in the Tom Goes to the Mayor episode "Couple's Therapy"), dies at age 66.
- March 25: Terry Brain, English animator (The Trap Door, Wallace & Gromit), dies at age 60.
- March 28: Igor Khait, American animator and film producer (Bebe's Kids, The Walt Disney Company), dies from pancreatic cancer at age 52.

=== April ===
- April 3:
  - Don Francks, Canadian actor (voice of Mok in Rock & Rule, Boba Fett in Star Wars: Droids, Umwak in Star Wars: Ewoks, Dr. Fright and The Vizier in Care Bears, Sabretooth in X-Men, second voice of Dr. Claw in Inspector Gadget), dies at age 84.
  - Kōji Wada, Japanese singer (performed several themes in the Digimon franchise), dies from cancer at age 42.
- April 6: Oto Reisinger, Croatian animator, illustrator, cartoonist and comics artist (Generali, vojskovodje, admirali, Tisucu devetsto devedeset prva), dies at age 89.
- April 9: Arthur Anderson, American actor (voice of Eustace Bagge in seasons 3-4 of Courage the Cowardly Dog, original voice of Lucky the Leprechaun in Lucky Charms ads), dies at age 93.

=== May ===
- May 5: Isao Tomita, Japanese composer (Osamu Tezuka), dies at age 84.
- May 8: William Schallert, American actor (narrator in Sparky's Magic Piano, voice of Professor Pomfrit and Farmer P./Neville Popenbacher in What's New, Scooby-Doo?, Appa Ali Apsa in Green Lantern: First Flight, Willem in The Smurfs episode "Tis the Season to Be Smurfy", Dr. Cahill in the Jumanji episode "The Plague", Dr. Cowtiki in The Angry Beavers episode "The Day the World Got Really Screwed Up", Judge Linden in The Zeta Project episode "The River Rising"), dies at age 93.
- May 13: Makiko Futaki, Japanese animator and illustrator (Studio Ghibli), dies at age 57.
- May 14: Darwyn Cooke, Canadian animator and comics artist (Warner Bros. Animation), dies from cancer at age 53.
- May 19: Alan Young, English actor (voice of Scrooge McDuck in DuckTales, Farmer Smurf in The Smurfs, Grandpa Seville in Alvin and the Chipmunks, 7-Zark-7 and Keyop in Battle of the Planets, Haggis McHaggis in The Ren & Stimpy Show, Hiram Flaversham in The Great Mouse Detective), dies at age 96.

=== June ===
- June 2: Willis Pyle, American animator (The Walt Disney Company, Walter Lantz, UPA, Peanuts, co-creator of Mr. Magoo), dies at age 101.
- June 3: Muhammad Ali, American boxer (voiced himself in I Am the Greatest: The Adventures of Muhammad Ali), dies at age 74.
- June 6: Theresa Saldana, American actress (voice of Rosa in New Kids on the Block, Mame Slaughter in Captain Planet and the Planeteers, Estella Velasquez in The Real Adventures of Jonny Quest, Mrs. Diaz in the Batman Beyond episode "Unmasked"), dies from pneumonia at age 61.
- June 12: Janet Waldo, American actress (voice of Judy Jetson in The Jetsons, Granny Sweet in Precious Pupp, Alice in Alice in Wonderland or What's a Nice Kid like You Doing in a Place like This? and Alice Through the Looking Glass, Lana Lang in The Adventures of Superboy, Nancy in Shazzan, Penelope Pitstop in Wacky Races and The Perils of Penelope Pitstop, Josie in Josie and the Pussycats, Morticia Addams in The Addams Family, Princess in Battle of the Planets, Cindy Bear in Yogi's First Christmas, Hogatha in The Smurfs, continued voice of Pearl Slaghoople in The Flintstones), dies at age 97.
- June 19: Anton Yelchin, American actor (voice of Jim Lake in Trollhunters: Tales of Arcadia, Shun Kazama in From Up on Poppy Hill, Albino Pirate in The Pirates! In an Adventure with Scientists!), dies in a car accident at age 27.
- June 30: Gordon Murray, English puppeteer, animator, and film and television producer (A Rubovian Legend, Camberwick Green, Trumpton, Chigley, worked on Captain Pugwash), dies at age 95.

=== July ===
- July 19: Garry Marshall, American filmmaker and actor (voice of Buck Cluck in Chicken Little, Larry Kidkill and Sheldon Leavitt in The Simpsons, Soda Jerk in Penn Zero: Part-Time Hero, Manny Goldman in Scooby-Doo! and Kiss: Rock and Roll Mystery, Bernie in Father of the Pride, Dr. Weisberg in The Looney Tunes Show, Fred in the Rugrats episode "Club Fred", Mr. Itch in the Pinky and the Brain episode "A Pinky and the Brain Halloween", Abe in the BoJack Horseman episode "Yes And"), dies at age 81.
- July 24: Marni Nixon, American actress (sang the title song in Cinderella, voiced the singing flowers in Alice in Wonderland, singing geese in Mary Poppins, and singing voice of Grandmother Fa in Mulan), dies at age 86.
- July 26: Jack Davis, American cartoonist and illustrator (Rankin/Bass), dies at age 91.

=== August ===
- August 5: Gigi Dane, American comics, cartoons and animation scholar and editor (co-founded together with her husband Don Markstein Apatoons), dies at age 66.
- August 14: Fyvush Finkel, American actor (voice of the Narrator in The Real Shlemiel, Jackie the Schtickman in Aaahh!!! Real Monsters, Hearing Aid in The Brave Little Toaster Goes to Mars, Shlomo in the Rugrats episode "Chanukah", himself in The Simpsons episode "Lisa's Sax"), dies from heart problems at age 93.
- August 19: Jack Riley, American actor (voice of Stu Pickles in Rugrats), dies at age 80.
- August 25: Marvin Kaplan, American actor (voice of Choo-Choo in Top Cat), dies at age 89.
- August 29: Gene Wilder, American actor and comedian (voice of Letterman in The Adventures of Letterman segments in The Electric Company), dies at age 83.
- Specific date unknown: Jukka Murtosaari, Finnish animator and comics artist, dies at age 53.

=== September ===
- September 1: Jon Polito, American actor (voice of Arnook in Avatar: The Last Airbender, Don Baffi in El Tigre: The Adventures of Manny Rivera, Commissioner Loeb in Batman: Year One, Hammerhead in the Ultimate Spider-Man episode "Return to the Spider-Verse: Part III", Griffin of Pittsford in the Rapunzel's Tangled Adventure episode "Not in the Mood", New Aldrin and New Pupert in The Buzz on Maggie episode "These Pesky Roaches", Funjil in the Chowder episode "The Moldy Touch", Sir Cranklin in the Robot and Monster episode "First Impressions", Al Capone in the Time Squad episode "The Clownfather", Mizaru in the Ben 10: Ultimate Alien episode "Simian Says"), dies at age 65.
- September 2: John Hostetter, American actor (voice of Bazooka in G.I. Joe: A Real American Hero, Honda in Tekkaman Blade II, Jake in Spicy City, Polk in Vampire Hunter D: Bloodlust, additional voices in Spawn), dies at age 69.
- September 3:
  - Anna Dewdney, American author and illustrator (creator of Llama Llama), dies at age 50.
  - Wolfgang Urchs, German director, screenwriter and animator (Janoschs Traumstunde, Stowaways on the Ark, Peter in Magicland), dies at age 94.
- September 4: Wilma Baker, American animator (Walt Disney Animation Studios), dies at age 99.
- September 7: Sparky Moore, American animator and comics artist (Hanna-Barbera, Cambria Productions), dies at age 91.
- September 11: Eduard Nazarov, Russian animator, children's book illustrator and actor (Once Upon a Dog), died at age 74.
- September 17: C. Martin Croker, American animator (Space Ghost Coast to Coast, Cartoon Planet, Aqua Teen Hunger Force, The Brak Show, Assy McGee) and voice actor (voice of Zorak and Moltar in Space Ghost Coast to Coast, Dr. Weird and Steve in Aqua Teen Hunger Force, Young Man in Perfect Hair Forever), dies from food poisoning at age 54.
- September 27: Julia Kalantarova, Uzbekistan-born American background artist (Jumanji, Klasky Csupo, Globehunters: An Around the World in 80 Days Adventure, The Electric Piper, Kid Notorious, Hi Hi Puffy AmiYumi, The Buzz on Maggie, The Simpsons Movie, Christmas Is Here Again, The Goode Family, G.I. Joe: Renegades, American Dad!, Bob's Burgers), dies from respiratory infection caused by breast cancer at age 45.

=== October ===
- October 5: Michiyo Yasuda, Japanese animator (Toei Animation, A Production, Nippon Animation, Topcraft, Studio Ghibli), dies at age 77.
- October 8:
  - Gary Dubin, American actor (voice of Toulouse in The Aristocats), dies at age 57.
  - Pierre Tchernia, French producer, screenwriter and animator (Asterix, Lucky Luke), dies at age 88.
- October 9: Susan Aceron, Canadian actress (voice of Sailor Pluto in Sailor Moon), dies at age 44.
- October 20:
  - Michael Massee, American actor (voice of Bruce Banner in Ultimate Avengers: The Movie and Ultimate Avengers 2: Rise of the Panther, Spellbinder in The Batman episode "The Butler Did It"), dies from stomach cancer at age 64.
  - Achieng Abura, Kenyan singer (voice of Crow in the Tinga Tinga Tales episode "Why Frog Croaks"), dies at an unknown age.
- October 21: Kevin Meaney, American actor and comedian (voice of Aloysius Pig in Garfield and Friends, John in Duckman, Computer in The Brave Little Toaster to the Rescue, Widow Hutchison in the Rocko's Modern Life episodes "The Big Question" and "The Big Answer", himself in the Dr. Katz, Professional Therapist episodes "Bystander Ben", "Henna" and "Ball and Chain"), dies from a heart attack at age 60.
- October 25: Kevin Curran, American television writer and producer (The Simpsons), dies from cancer at age 59.
- October 27: Barry Anthony Trop, American composer (Captain Zed and the Zee Zone, Big Bad Beetleborgs, SpongeBob SquarePants), dies at age 64.
- October 30: Tammy Grimes, American actress (voice of Albert in 'Twas the Night Before Christmas, Molly Grue in The Last Unicorn, Catrina in My Little Pony Escape from Catrina), dies at age 82.

=== November ===
- November 4: Jean-Jacques Perrey, French electronic music performer, composer, producer and promoter (composed background music for SpongeBob SquarePants, Fetch! with Ruff Ruffman, The Mighty B!, South Park and The Simpsons), dies from lung cancer at age 87.
- November 19: Gino Gavioli, Italian comics artist and animator (Gamma Film, Ulisse e l'Ombra, Caio Gregorio er guardiano der pretorio, Il vigile, Babbut, Mammut e Figliut, Derby, Capitan Trinchetto, Joe Galassia, Serafino spazza antennino, Tacabanda, Cimabue), dies at age 93.
- November 24:
  - Al Brodax, American film and television producer (Paramount, King Features, The Beatles, Yellow Submarine), dies at age 90.
  - Florence Henderson, American actress (voice of Grand Mum in Sofia the First, Mallory "Mastermind" Casey in Loonatics Unleashed, Nanny Barbara in The Cleveland Show episode "The Men in Me", Ruby Stone in the Scooby-Doo: Mystery Incorporated episode "Dead Justice", herself in the Nightmare Ned episode "Monster Ned"), dies at age 82.
- November 25: Ron Glass, American actor (voice of Randy Carmichael in Rugrats and All Grown Up!, Dr. Lazenby in Recess: School's Out, Talking Baby in The Proud Family, Kwanseer in the Aladdin episode "Bad Mood Rising", News Anchorman in the Superman: The Animated Series episode "Blasts From The Past"), dies from respiratory failure at age 71.
- November 27: Eric Fredrickson, Canadian animator (Atkinson Film-Arts, The Raccoons, Rupert) and storyboard artist (Atkinson Film-Arts, COPS, Young Robin Hood, James Bond Jr., Stunt Dawgs, The Legend of White Fang, Doug, Adventures in Odyssey, Action Man, Where on Earth Is Carmen Sandiego?, Life with Louie, Happily Ever After: Fairy Tales for Every Child, Family Guy, Stuart Little, American Dad!), dies at age 54.

=== December ===
- December 14: Bernard Fox, Welsh actor (voice of the Chairmouse in The Rescuers and The Rescuers Down Under, Henry Morton Stanley in the Time Squad episode "Out with the In Crowd"), dies at age 89.
- December 17: Gordon Hunt, American writer, director (Hanna-Barbera), and actor (voice of Wally in Dilbert), dies at age 87.
- December 24: Liz Smith, British actress (voice of Mrs. Mulch in Wallace & Gromit: The Curse of the Were-Rabbit), dies at age 95.
- December 26: George S. Irving, American actor (narrator in Underdog, voice of Heat Miser in The Year Without a Santa Claus, and Captain Contagious in Raggedy Ann and Andy: A Musical Adventure), dies at age 94.
- December 27: Carrie Fisher, American actress (voice of Princess Leia in The Star Wars Holiday Special and Robot Chicken: Star Wars Episode II, Angela in Family Guy, Roz Katz in the Dr. Katz, Professional Therapist episode "Thanksgiving"), dies at age 60.
- December 28: Debbie Reynolds, American actress (voice of Charlotte in Charlotte's Web, Mitzi, Mrs. Claus, and Mrs. Prancer in Rudolph the Red-Nosed Reindeer: The Movie, Lulu Pickles in Rugrats, Nana Possible in Kim Possible), dies at age 84.
- December 30: Tyrus Wong, Chinese-American painter, calligrapher, muralist, ceramicist, lithographer, kite designer, set designer, storyboard artist and animator (The Walt Disney Company), dies at age 106.

== See also ==
- 2016 in anime
- List of animated television series of 2016
