= Tuzki =

Chinese fictional internet character

- Last appearance: 2007
- Created by: Momo Wang

Tuzki (Chinese: 兔斯基; Korean: 투즈키; Japanese: ツヅキ) is a popular illustrated bunny character created by animator Momo Wang when she was an undergraduate at the Communication University of China (CUC). Featured in a variety of emoticons, her character has become popular with QQ and MSN users. Nowadays, Tuzki has extended his emoticon popularity to different major messaging app platforms including WeChat, KakaoTalk, Facebook and VNG Corporation's Zalo.

According to the official website, Tuzki was born on 6 September 2006.

Tuzki is currently managed by TurnOut Ventures, a joint venture between Turner Broadcasting and Outblaze established in Hong Kong in 2008.

According to a post on Tuzki's official Facebook page, there are over 20 million sends of Tuzki stickers worldwide every day.

== History ==
In 2007, Motorola used the Tuzki images to promote its Motorola Q9h smartphone in Asia, touting its Internet and instant messaging capabilities.

In January 2013, during a premium campaign by KFC China, over 9.5 million units of Tuzki premium figurines were distributed nationwide in China at more than 3,000 KFC restaurants.

In March 2013, the Tuzki edition of the Fujifilm Instax mini camera and films was launched in China.

TurnOut Ventures premiered Tuzki: Love Assassin on YouTube on 13 February 2014 as a Valentine's Day stunt for Tuzki fans. It was written and directed by Julian Frost, the creator of the viral animation Dumb Ways to Die. The animation was produced by Studio 4°C.

An image of Tuzki: Love Assassin was displayed on the Thomson Reuters building in Times Square in New York City from 14-18 February 2014.

In July 2014, Facebook launched Tuzki stickers on Facebook Messenger, which quickly became one of the most frequently used stickers by Facebook users. In September, Facebook Japan announced the top 10 most popular sticker sets in Japan and Tuzki was on the list. By popular demand, Facebook launched the second set of Tuzki stickers in December.

In April 2015, Tuzki was featured on the Financial Times. The article talked about the success of Tuzki in China and how he had become a surprise hit with millennials around the world.

On March 22, 2018, Six Flags and Riverside Investment Group announced that they had partnered with Turner to bring Tuzki and other Turner IPs to its upcoming theme parks in China.

On April 20, 2021, it was announced there will be a crossover between Tuzki and the Indian animated series Lamput. The episode, "Lamput meets Tuzki", was released on August 3, 2021. Another Lamput episode featuring Tuzki, titled "Tuzki the Intern", was released on June 16, 2024.
