= Party Legends =

- Genre: Documentary
- Created by: Lance Bangs
- Directed by: Lance Bangs
- Composer: Bennie Hurst
- Country of origin: United States
- Original language: English
- No. of seasons: 2
- No. of episodes: 14

Production
- Executive producers: Lance Bangs; Spike Jonze; Eddy Moretti; Shane Smith; Jeff Sammon; Casey Rup
- Cinematography: Lance Bangs
- Animator: Various
- Camera setup: Multi-camera
- Running time: 30 minutes
- Production companies: Field Recordings; Starburns Industries

Original release
- Network: Viceland
- Release: July 7, 2016 – July 27, 2017

Party Legends is an American live-action/animated series that aired on Viceland, where celebrities narrate crazy, often-drug-induced, true stories of things that happened to them at parties. Based on a series of videos uploaded on Vice's YouTube channel in 2012, the TV series aired from July 7, 2016 to July 27, 2017.

The series was produced by Field Recordings, in partnership with Starburns Industries and Vice Labs.

== Episodes ==
=== Season 1 (2016) ===
1. What Are You Into? (July 7, 2016) (Alia Shawkat, Jon Daly, Chris Pontius, Kid Ink)
2. Making Mistakes (July 14, 2016) (Eric André, Earl Sweatshirt, Margaret Cho, Lizzo)
3. Am I in the Morgue? (July 21, 2016) (Fred Armisen, Bushwick Bill, Ryan Sickler, Bridget Everett)
4. Clearly On Another Dimension (July 28, 2016) (T.J. Miller, Kreayshawn, Erin McGathy, David Pajo)
5. Some Weird Loophole (August 4, 2016) (Dennis Rodman, JD Samson, Dave England, Har Mar Superstar)
6. Nude Dude Walking Through (August 11, 2016) (Bobcat Goldthwait, Estelle, Sean Patton, Rory Scovel, Howard Kremer)

=== Season 2 (2017) ===
1. Sexy Kurt Cobain (June 8, 2017) (Soko, BJ the Chicago Kid, Paul Scheer, Ice-T)
2. The Problem With Rap Music Today (June 15, 2017) (Ninja of Die Antwoord, Clare O'Kane, Artie Lange, Mark Gonzales)
3. Breaking Bad Vibes (June 22, 2017) (Theophilus London, Duncan Trussell, Derek Waters, Nikki Glaser, Kansas Bowling)
4. Beating Arsenio in the Chest Repeatedly (June 29, 2017) (Nancy Whang, Kool Keith, David Gborie, Fetty Wap)
5. Greased Up Like a Chicken (July 6, 2017) (ATL Twins, The Kid Mero, Chilli, Prince Markie Dee)
6. That's Plant Food (July 13, 2017) (Sam Jay, Andy Dick, Killer Mike, Matt Walsh, Angel Deradoorian, Jon Wurster)
7. No Shortage of Boobs at this Party (July 20, 2017) (Natasha Lyonne, Jimmy O. Yang, Desus, Mike Watt)
8. Instinct is Automatic (July 27, 2017) (Ghostface Killah, Big Boi, Kim Gordon, Nina Tarr)

== See also ==
- Greatest Party Story Ever
