= List of Lamput episodes =

Episodes from an Indian animated series

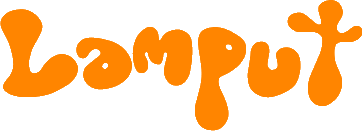

The following is a list of episodes from the series Lamput created by Vaibhav Kumaresh. Season 1's 15 second micro shorts were previewed in 2016 and 2017 before the show's premiere in India. Season 2's episodes were longer than the first, with 21 2-minute episodes.

In 2019, Season 3 was announced on several websites online. During April 2021, Cartoon Network announced the crossover with Lamput and a character named Tuzki; along with Season 4.

As of 30 December 2024, 147 episodes of Lamput have aired, currently in its fourth season.

== Series overview ==
Season	Episodes	Originally released	
Season	Episodes	First released	Last released
1	46	30 November 2016	4 December 2016
2	21	9 January 2018	28 October 2018
3	43	23 February 2020	3 August 2021
4	42	25 June 2022	TBA

== Episodes ==
=== Season 1 (2017) ===
In Season 1, all episodes are in 15 seconds.

No. overall	No. in season	Title	Original release date
1	1	"Hair Bun"	21 September 2017
Lamput pretends to be the bun in a woman's hair to hide from Skinny.
2	2	"Prints"	21 September 2017
Specs and Skinny follow Lamput's footprints into a sewer.
3	3	"Poster"	21 September 2017
The docs show Mr. Moustache a wanted poster of Lamput and ask if he's seen him.
4	4	"Bus Stop"	21 September 2017
Specs searches for Lamput, who has turned into a woman's shirt on a bus stop.
5	5	"Glasses"	21 September 2017
Lamput takes advantage of how Specs needs to wear glasses to see properly.
6	6	"Orange Door"	21 September 2017
Lamput makes Specs think he's trapped on the other side of a door.
7	7	"Vegetrouble"	21 September 2017
Lamput camouflages with a pumpkin shop to hide from Specs.
8	8	"Orange Balloon"	21 September 2017
A kid refuses to give Skinny his orange balloon, which is actually Lamput.
9	9	"Camouflage"	21 September 2017
The docs chase Lamput through checkerboard patterns of various colors.
10	10	"Dog"	21 September 2017
Lamput gets a dog to help him to escape from Specs.
11	11	"Orange Paint"	21 September 2017
Skinny sees Specs covered in orange paint and mistakes him for Lamput.
12	12	"Orange Title"	21 September 2017
The docs suspect Lamput is hiding in the show's intro.
13	13	"Musical"	21 September 2017
The docs accidentally create a rhythm as they bang trash cans trying to grab Lamput.
14	14	"Orange Overdose"	21 September 2017
Specs gets frustrated looking for Lamput in a bunch of orange-colored objects.
15	15	"War"	21 September 2017
Lamput and the docs face off in a war of weapons that gradually escalate in power.
16	16	"Guilt"	21 September 2017
Lamput makes a decoy of himself and makes Specs feel guilty when he destroys it by accident.
17	17	"Oil Massage"	21 September 2017
Lamput gets massaged with oil by Specs, who wants to put the oil on his hair.
18	18	"Orange Camera"	21 September 2017
Lamput pretends to be an orange camera, and Skinny tries to take a picture of Specs with it.
19	19	"Horror Movie"	21 September 2017
Lamput gives the docs an unexpected scare when they watch a horror film in a theater.
20	20	"Bank Robbery"	21 September 2017
Specs is mistaken for a bank robber when Lamput turns into a gun in his hand.
21	21	"Love Chat"	21 September 2017
Lamput distracts Specs while he is talking to his girlfriend on his phone.
22	22	"Prison Cell"	21 September 2017
Specs has finally put Lamput in a prison cell in the laboratory.
23	23	"Cat"	21 September 2017
Lamput makes a cat look like a lion to scare off Skinny.
24	24	"Orange Rose"	21 September 2017
Lamput poses as a rose, and a woman thinks Skinny is offering the flower as a gift to her.
25	25	"Orange Umbrella"	21 September 2017
Lamput helps out Skinny by turning into an umbrella when they are both caught in a rainstorm.
26	26	"Magic Show"	21 September 2017
Specs is mistaken for a magic act when Lamput morphs into different things in his hand.
27	27	"Cliffhanger"	21 September 2017
Lamput tries to get Specs' glasses back on him before he falls off the edge of a cliff.
28	28	"Eye Test"	21 September 2017
The docs accompany Lamput during his eye test.
29	29	"Carrot"	21 September 2017
Lamput hides in a field of carrots as Specs looks for him.
30	30	"Chloroform"	21 September 2017
The docs use chloroform in an attempt to stun Lamput and capture him.
31	31	"Newspaper"	21 September 2017
Lamput changes shape to avoid being identified as the person on a wanted ad in a newspaper by Mr. Moustache.
32	32	"Biker"	21 September 2017
Specs prepares to ride his motorcycle.
33	33	"Sunset"	21 September 2017
Specs photographs a sunset which turns out to be Lamput.
34	34	"Slide"	21 September 2017
Specs chases Lamput in a children's playground.
35	35	"Bubbles"	21 September 2017
Lamput goes into a boy's bottle of bubble formula and comes out of his bubble wand as orange bubbles.
36	36	"Fire"	21 September 2017
A fireman thinks Lamput is a flame and drenches the docs in hose water.
37	37	"Reward"	21 September 2017
Lamput makes the docs fight over a cash reward he makes up on one of his wanted posters.
38	38	"Glasses 2"	21 September 2017
Lamput distracts the docs by taking Specs' glasses off him and putting them on Skinny.
39	39	"Rifle"	21 September 2017
Lamput becomes a rifle to help Specs fend off a thief.
40	40	"Bellbottoms"	21 September 2017
At a disco club, Lamput transforms into a pair of bellbottoms on Specs, and the women take a liking to it.
41	41	"Bridge"	21 September 2017
Lamput and the docs have their chase on a seaside cliff.
42	42	"Toy Car"	21 September 2017
Lamput cheers up a girl whose toy car is broken by morphing into a bigger car for her to drive.
43	43	"Fish Tank"	21 September 2017
Lamput takes the form of a starfish when Specs tries to grab him from a fish tank in a pet store.
44	44	"Octopus"	21 September 2017
Lamput gets help from an octopus when the docs take their chase underwater.
45	45	"Artist"	21 September 2017
Lamput and the docs disrupt a painter's hard work.
46	46	"Wig"	21 September 2017
Specs thinks Skinny is a woman and develops a crush on "her" when Lamput pretends to be female hair on his head.

=== Season 2 (2018) ===
In Season 2, all episodes are in 2 minutes. Also, every episode in the season was released on YouTube as well.

No. overall	No. in season	Title	Original release date
47	1	"Signs"	7 August 2018
The docs keep getting in trouble with Mr. Moustache when Lamput messes with signs near them.
48	2	"Hilltop"	10 August 2018
The docs try to catch Lamput, who is relaxing on top of a hill.
49	3	"Superstore"	14 August 2018
Specs searches a soopermarket for Lamput.
50	4	"Boxing"	17 August 2018
Skinny is unwittingly pulled into a boxing match, with Lamput as his pair of boxing gloves.
51	5	"Haunted House"	9 January 2018
Lamput scares Specs and Skinny in a mysterious house.
52	6	"Houdini"	21 August 2018
The docs concoct all sorts of ideas to capture Lamput.
53	7	"Orange Street"	24 August 2018
The docs use a special gun to aid in their search for Lamput on a street full of orange things.
54	8	"Fracture"	28 August 2018
The docs help Lamput get back into shape when he gets a fracture.
55	9	"Art Gallery"	31 August 2018
The docs go through an art museum to find Lamput.
56	10	"Airport"	4 September 2018
The hunt for Lamput continues in an airport.
57	11	"Flicker"	7 September 2018
The docs affect Lamput with a serum that makes anything it touches rapidly change color.
58	12	"Gym"	11 September 2018
Lamput is working out in a gym and gives the docs trouble with the gym equipment.
59	13	"Hypnosis"	30 September 2018
Specs is inspired by a TV show to hypnotize Lamput.
60	14	"Diet Doc"	4 October 2018
Specs realizes just how fat he is and tries to get fit.
61	15	"Alien"	7 October 2018
The docs chase Lamput into an alien's spacecraft.
62	16	"Shape Shift"	10 October 2018
The docs invent a serum that lets them shapeshift like Lamput.
63	17	"Thief"	13 October 2018
Lamput goes after a thief who has stolen a lady's purse.
64	18	"Martial Art"	17 October 2018
Lamput faces off against the docs in a movie theater, in the style of a martial arts film.
65	19	"Sleepy Docs"	21 October 2018
The docs fall asleep in the middle of driving, and Lamput tries to keep them safe.
66	20	"Doc Dog"	24 October 2018
The docs train a ferocious dog to go after Lamput for them.
67	21	"Snow"	28 October 2018
The docs try to catch the two halves of Lamput that have split from each other while he was skiing.

=== Season 3 (2020–21) ===
As of Season 3, the show's episodes were 2–5 minutes and 7 minutes for special episodes.

No. overall	No. in season	Title	Runtime	Original release date
68	1	"The Chase"	4:54	23 February 2020
The docs chase Lamput on land, in the sea, and in the air.
69	2	"Rival Doc"	4:48	1 March 2020
The docs are replaced with a new doc who does surprisingly well at catching Lamput.
70	3	"The Split"	4:50	1 March 2020
The docs get into a feud over their many failures to capture Lamput, and the blob himself tries to get them to be friends again.
71	4	"Water"	1:57	7 March 2020
In the desert, a thirsty Lamput is trapped in the docs' van, who refuse to give him water.
72	5	"Future Tense"	1:57	12 March 2020
Skinny gets his fortune told by a fortune teller, who keeps reading his palms and palmprints and discovers he will keep almost being hurt, forcing him to rescue Skinny.
73	6	"Skinny at the Pool"	2:03	18 March 2020
When Lamput morphs into a trophy, Skinny is forced to compete in a swimming competition to win him.
74	7	"Date Night"	1:57	4 April 2020
Lamput tags along on Specs' date to make sure things go smoothly.
75	8	"Lamput and the Spider"	1:57	5 April 2020
Lamput befriends a spider after helping him with his web. The spider decides to return the favor by saving him from a swarm of mosquitoes.
76	9	"Origins"	4:50	12 April 2020
After getting arrested, the docs decide to pass the time by reminiscing the day they met at lab school.
77	10	"Pup Mix"	1:54	18 April 2020
An elderly lady mistakes Lamput and the docs for her dogs.
78	11	"Age Remote"	1:58	24 April 2020
Lamput and the docs mess with a special remote that can increase or decrease any living being's age.
79	12	"Dr. Lamput"	4:51	25 April 2020
After tripping on a bucket of grey paint, Lamput is mistaken as one of the many workers at Specs and Skinny's laboratory.
80	13	"Sunday Holiday"	1:57	1 June 2020
Skinny sleeps in on Sunday, but that doesn't stop him from being dragged along by Specs to find Lamput.
81	14	"Arm Wrestling"	4:50	9 June 2020
When the docs lose an arm wrestling match to Mr. Moustache, their boss tries to outmatch him.
82	15	"Meet the Shrink"	1:57	11 July 2020
Specs and Skinny go to the doctor to take care of nightmares they've been having about Lamput.
83	16	"Invisible Necklace"	2:00	15 July 2020
The docs steal a magician's invisibility necklace and use it to sneak up on Lamput.
84	17	"Transfer Gun"	4:50	19 September 2020
The docs' boss unintentionally has his mind swapped with Lamput's using a special mind-transferring gun he invented.
85	18	"Super Docs"	4:51	26 September 2020
When the docs accidentally retrieve superclothes from a dry cleaner other than their normal clothes, they use it to aid in their hunt for Lamput.
86	19	"Skinny's Dance Night"	4:50	13 October 2020
When Skinny gets worn out after practicing for a dance, Lamput morphs into his clothes to control his body and help him attend.
87	20	"Lamput Checks In"	4:50	22 October 2020
The docs go into a fancy hotel to look for Lamput, but the three ensues chaos throughout.
88	21	"Lamput and the Elephant"	4:50	3 February 2021
Lamput helps a baby elephant find her mother, while the docs set up a trap for Lamput.
89	22	"Skinny Monster"	4:50	7 February 2021
After unintentionally drinking a fluid from the fridge, Skinny turns into a monster and back, every time he hiccups. Specs thinks this is the perfect opportunity to catch Lamput.
90	23	"Memory Loss"	1:58	7 February 2021
Specs is hit on the head and thinks he is a baby, so Skinny and Lamput must take care of him.
91	24	"Sleepwalking"	4:50	13 February 2021
When Skinny starts sleepwalking, Specs thinks he's a zombie that has invaded his house.
92	25	"Basketball"	1:57	17 February 2021
When Lamput gets the docs caught in the middle of a basketball game, the three team up to claim victory.
93	26	"Zoom Oil"	1:55	13 March 2021
The docs invent a super speed lotion to catch Lamput.
94	27	"Doc and the Thief"	4:50	13 March 2021
During a chase with Lamput, Specs gets mistaken for a criminal, while the criminal takes on the live of the former.
95	28	"Witch"	1:58	22 March 2021
When the docs chase Lamput into a haunted castle, they use a flying broomstick to catch up with him.
96	29	"Reward"	4:51	30 March 2021
The docs post a big reward for Lamput's capture, but don't expect that anyone actually wants to get paid for it. They try to make enough money to pay for the cost.
97	30	"Fashion Show"	1:57	5 April 2021
The docs chase Lamput into a fashion show and are forced to participate in order to catch him.
98	31	"Thief in the Museum"	4:50	12 April 2021
The docs chase Lamput in a museum's ancient Egypt exhibit, whilst a thief plans on stealing a jewelry diamond.
99	32	"Evolution"	1:57	12 April 2021
On the beach, when Lamput is bullied for his blobby body, he morphs into something bigger.
100	33	"Shrunk Doc"	6:46	13 April 2021
The docs build a ray that can shrink anyone, but when a shrunken Lamput resides in the Boss' moustache, the docs shrink themselves to give chase.
101	34	"Rock Concert"	1:58	12 May 2021
The docs chase Lamput onto the stage of a rock concert, but are mistaken for the performers.
102	35	"Boss' Mom"	4:50	14 May 2021
The docs are asked to pick up the Boss' mother from the train station, but accidentally bring in the wrong person.
103	36	"Boss'stache"	4:50	13 June 2021
When the Boss loses his signature moustache, he teams up with Lamput to grow a new one.
104	37	"Jamput"	6:48	19 June 2021
Specs tries to turn in a counterfeit Lamput, passing it off as the real thing, but Skinny and the real Lamput grow suspicious.
105	38	"Alien Again"	4:50	19 June 2021
Skinny winds up in a UFO mistaken as an alien, while his alien counterpart gets mistaken as him.
106	39	"Opera"	1:57	10 July 2021
The docs cause trouble during an opera performance when they try to catch Lamput.
107	40	"Wig"	6:46	15 July 2021
Specs thinks Skinny is a woman and falls in love with him after Lamput morphs into long hair on Skinny's head.
108	41	"Animal X"	6:47	24 July 2021
The docs use a machine to merge Specs with numerous animals to help him chase and capture Lamput.
109	42	"Cast Away"	6:49	25 July 2021
Specs and Lamput become stranded on a faraway island and team up to survive while Skinny tries to find them.
110	43	"Lamput Meets Tuzki"	6:43	3 August 2021
During a field trip to the laboratory, a student named Tuzki meets Lamput and ends up being chased by the docs along with him.

=== Season 4 (2022–24) ===
This season was announced in April 2021. Most episodes are 7 minutes long with a few episodes that are 2–5 minutes long. Specials are 11 minutes long now. All episodes are listed in their airing or release order on Cartoon Network India and Asia, not their packaging order.

No. overall	No. in season	Title	Directed by	Runtime	Original release date	Prod. code
111	1	"Everyone Needs Friends"	Athawut Vitheethum	7:02	25 June 2022	401
Lamput befriends a sea monster and helps him make more friends. Meanwhile, Specs and Skinny rile up the entire town to form a mob against the monster.
112	2	"Doc Mob"	Ervin Han	7:03	25 June 2022	402
The docs invent a wrist gadget that lets them clone themselves, and have their clones go after Lamput. However, it backfires when their clones move in with the docs and cause mayhem.
113	3	"Library"	Brian Chong	7:02	2 July 2022	403
When Lamput and the docs accidentally free an evil ghost from a magic book at the library, the three team up to trap it back in the book.
114	4	"Robinput"	Anand Babu	7:02	3 July 2022	404
Lamput reads to everyone in the laboratory, a Robin Hood parody tale, featuring him and Specs and Skinny.
115	5	"Soccer Punch"	Brian Chong	7:03	3 July 2022	405
Lamput complicates a soccer game for the docs which ends up with them actually playing the game.
116	6	"In the Gut"	Athawut Vitheethum & Jeerawot Udomlotophal	5:03	6 July 2022	406
116	6	"Reverse"	Athawut Vitheethum & Jeerawot Udomlotophal	2:03	9 July 2022	406
In the Gut: When Specs accidentally swallows Lamput, he and Skinny rush to the laboratory before the latter finds his way out. Reverse: The docs invent a device that reverses time.
117	7	"Tuzki the Intern"	Anand Babu	7:03	16 June 2024	407
When Tuzki is hired at the laboratory, he is tasked by the docs to capture Lamput.
118	8	"Abduction"	Ervin Han	7:03	16 June 2024	408
When Specs and Lamput get abducted by aliens, Skinny and the Boss set out to save them.
119	9	"Wrong Date"	Jeerawot Udomlotophal	7:02	16 June 2024	409
Mr. Moustache is on a date with Ms. Lipstick, his crush, but keep getting interrupted by the docs and Lamput with their chasing.
120	10	"The House Guest"	Brian Chong	7:03	16 June 2024	410
When Lamput is stuck in the docs' house on a rainy day, he causes mischief making Specs and Skinny angry at each other.
121	11	"The Desert Years"	Ervin Han	7:02	16 June 2024	411
Lamput and the docs must find their way home when they get lost in a desert.
122	12	"Lamput and the Beanstalk"	Anand Babu	11:02	16 June 2024	412
After a reversed shrink ray amplifies the size of a plant into a beanstalk with the docs and Lamput stuck on top of it, the three discover a giant who picks a carrot with Skinny inside of it. Lamput and Specs set out to save him.
123	13	"Break Out"	Ervin Han	7:03	22 June 2024	413
The docs finally catch Lamput but unexpectedly miss chasing him, so they make a plan to break him out.
124	14	"Magic Marker"	Jeerawot Udomlotophal	7:02	22 June 2024	414
The docs buy a magic marker that can control anything when they write on their wrists with it.
125	15	"Theater Night"	Brian Chong	7:03	22 June 2024	415
The docs go backstage in a play, trying to catch Lamput but interrupt the play itself.
126	16	"Boss on the Moon"	Anand Babu	11:03	23 June 2024	416
The Boss wants peace and quiet while he's writing a book but accidentally launches himself into the moon, forcing the docs, Lamput, and everyone in the laboratory to rescue him.
127	17	"Dragon Bros"	Brain Chong	7:03	23 June 2024	417
When an orange fire-breathing dragon captures the docs, Lamput sets out to save them.
128	18	"The Tribe"	Jeerawot Udomlotophal	7:03	23 June 2024	418
Lamput is mistaken as the Chosen One by an underground primeval tribe, and the docs try to catch him but are thwarted by the tribe.
129	19	"Some Kind of Magic"	Ervin Han	7:03	23 June 2024	419
The docs chase Lamput backstage during a magic show and accidentally appear onstage.
130	20	"Strength Potion"	Anand Babu	11:03	23 June 2024	420
Lamput buys a bottle that gives him super strength to help him with his chores at home, but when the docs discover and use it for themselves, it backfires.
131	21	"The Little Ghost Prince"	Ervin Han	7:03	7 July 2024 (Earliest known date)	421
The docs chase Lamput into a spooky mansion, where the latter meets a friendly ghost who owns it, and the formers are chased by various monsters.
132	22	"Back to School"	Brian Chong	7:02	15 November 2024 (Note: This episode was first uploaded to YouTube by Cartoon Network Asia.)	422
When Lamput hides inside an elementary school, the docs build a remote that turns them into kids so they can infiltrate the school and find him.
133	23	"Giant Lamput"	Jeerawot Udomlotophal	7:01	22 November 2024 (Note: This episode was first uploaded to YouTube by Cartoon Network Asia.)	437
When a fluid spills on Lamput, he grows huge, so the docs build a giant robot to catch him.
134	24	"Arctic Adventure"	Ervin Han	7:03	22 November 2024	436
When the docs find Lamput in the North Pole, they disguise themselves as arctic animals to try and catch him.
135	25	"Tall Tales"	Anand Babu	7:03	22 November 2024	428
When Specs and Skinny arrive late for work, they lie to the Boss that they were too busy trying to catch Lamput, in the form of a stop-motion story.
136	26	"Stuck"	Brian Chong	7:03	22 November 2024	430
The docs invent a ray that makes anyone it hits stuck to a gooey substance but it backfires when Lamput gets stuck to Specs' head.
137	27	"The Doc Express"	Ervin Han	7:03	22 November 2024	433
When the docs realize they're on the same train as Lamput, they try to catch him but chaos ensues throughout.
138	28	"The Siren Song"	Ervin Han	7:02	22 November 2024 (Note: This episode was first uploaded to YouTube by Cartoon Network Asia.)	429
While chasing Lamput in the middle of the ocean, Skinny gets hypnotized by the siren of the mermaids and gets treated like a king. Meanwhile, Specs and Lamput set out to save him.
139	29	"Rival's Revenge"	Anand Babu	11:01	20 December 2024 (Note: This episode was first uploaded to YouTube by Cartoon Network Asia.)	424
Set after the events of the season 3 episode "Rival Doc", the rival doc gets revenge on Specs and Skinny for his firing by knocking out a worker in the laboratory and framing them for the crime.
140	30	"Lamput & the Ducklings"	Jeerawot Udomlotophal	7:03	22 December 2024	431
Lamput helps some duck parents find their ducklings, but they become too much for him to handle.
141	31	"Boss' Birthday"	Jeerawot Udomlotophal	7:02	22 December 2024	426
To surprise the Boss on his birthday, the docs try to catch Lamput as a present for him, but this becomes a fierce battle when everyone in the laboratory also want to catch Lamput for the Boss.
142	32	"Lamput, Docs & Robot"	Jeerawot Udomlotophal	7:02	23 December 2024	432
The docs build a robot to help catch Lamput, but when the robot malfunctions, it ends up attacking everyone in the laboratory, including Lamput.
143	33	"Clowning Around"	Brian Chong	7:03	23 December 2024	434
Lamput helps a clown gain attention at a carnival but when the former enters a fun house, the docs go after him.
144	34	"Power of Moustache"	Jeerawot Udomlotophal	7:02	24 December 2024 (Note: This episode was first uploaded to YouTube by Cartoon Network Asia.)	423
The docs think they would do much better at catching Lamput if they had moustaches, so they grow one of their own and gain popularity.
145	35	"Docs on the Moon"	Ervin Han	7:03	24 December 2024 (Note: This episode was first uploaded to YouTube by Cartoon Network Asia.)	425
The docs and the Boss chase Lamput all the way to outer space, but when Lamput discovers an evil alien plot to take over Earth, he enlists help from the three.
146	36	"Boss' Mom 2"	Brian Chong	7:03	24 December 2024	427
The docs finally catch Lamput but when the Boss' mom comes to visit, the docs are forced to chaperone her while she spends time with Lamput.
147	37	"A Case of Mistaken Identity"	Brian Chong	7:03	30 December 2024	435
Droopy and Thief get their suitcases switched after an accident with Lamput and the docs. Thief holds Lamput and the docs hostage until he finds his suitcase.
TBA	TBA	"Young at Heart"	TBA	TBA	TBA	TBA
TBA	TBA	"Science Fair"	TBA	TBA	TBA	TBA
TBA	TBA	"Stormy Day"	TBA	TBA	TBA	TBA
TBA	TBA	"Lottery"	TBA	TBA	TBA	TBA
TBA	TBA	"Blind Date"	TBA	TBA	TBA	TBA
