= Lamput =

2016 Cartoon Network India series

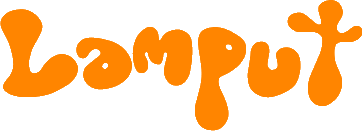
- Created by: Vaibhav Kumaresh
- Directed by: Anand Babu; Vaibhav Kumaresh
- Composers: Roto Shah; Advait Nemlekar
- Country of origin: India
- Original languages: Silent; Interjection
- No. of seasons: 4
- No. of episodes: 147 (list of episodes)

Production
- Executive producers: Leslie Lee; Mark Eyers; Silas Hickey
- Producer: Chai Yoon Fei
- Running time: 15 seconds–11 minutes
- Production company: Vaibhav Studios

Original release
- Network: Cartoon Network (Note: Starting on June 2024, new episodes of Lamput started airing on Cartoon Network Japan first, with its Indian premiere on the following day.)
- Release: 30 November 2016 – present

Lamput is an Indian animated television series of shorts created by Vaibhav Kumaresh and produced by Vaibhav Studios for Cartoon Network India and Asia. The series consists of shorts ranging from 18 seconds to 3 to 5 minutes, as well as some 7-minute specials and three 11-minute specials from Season 4. The title character is a gooey, orange creature named Lamput who has escaped from a laboratory and is chased by the scientists Specs and Skinny.

== Synopsis ==
Lamput is a gooey, orange creature who has escaped the laboratory of Specs and Skinny. They try to catch Lamput, but never succeed in their endeavors due to his shapeshifting ability.

== Episodes ==
Season	Episodes	Originally released	
Season	Episodes	First released	Last released
1	46	30 November 2016	4 December 2016
2	21	9 January 2018	28 October 2018
3	43	23 February 2020	3 August 2021
4	42	25 June 2022	TBA

== Characters ==
=== Main ===
- Lamput is the titular character of the show. He is a gooey, orange creature that escaped from the Docs' laboratory.
- Specs, also known as Fat Doc, is the gray-skinned fat scientist who tries to catch Lamput.
- Skinny, also known as Slim Doc, is the gray-skinned slim scientist who also tries to catch Lamput.

=== Supporting ===
- Mr. Moustache: He is a fit-built, yellow-skinned police officer. He holds a grudge against the docs for bullying him when they were students, and sometimes arrests or beats them up.
- Doctor: He is a pink-skinned doctor who sometimes checks Lamput and the docs.
- Droopy (Formerly Mr. Bald): He is a light-blue-skinned citizen who works at various jobs throughout the city.
- The Boss: He is the doc's gray-skinned boss. He has a big white moustache and is in charge of the lab. He gets angry at the docs when they return to the lab without Lamput.
- Ms. Lipstick: She is a white-skinned lady who has a crush on Mr. Moustache.
- Thief: A robber who usually steals everything.

== Production and development ==
Lamput was created by Vaibhav Kumaresh, and produced by Vaibhav Studios for Cartoon Network India and Asia. Lamput earned the distinction of being the first Indian show sold from a pitch bible that has gone to air globally.

The series consisted of 18-second micro-shorts, which were extended to 2 minutes for the second season. The third season consists of episodes ranging from 3 to 5 minutes, as well as some 7-minute specials.

On 20 April 2021, a crossover between Lamput and Chinese internet character Tuzki was announced. It was also announced that a fourth season was in the works.

== Broadcast and release ==
The series airs on Cartoon Network in EMEA and Latin America. Lamput has also started airing on Boomerang and Cartoonito worldwide. In the United States, Lamput is broadcast via HBO Max and Cartoon Network. It was added to HBO Max on 28 April 2022, and started airing on Cartoon Network on 23 May 2022. It also started airing on Boomerang on 15 August 2022, but ended its run on 26 August. The series was later added to Hulu on 13 September 2024.

== Reception ==
Lamput received mostly positive reviews from critics and audiences.

Cartoon Brew praised the show's animation as "a fresh look for [it] with sharp animation timing and attractive design." Polly Conway of Common Sense Media gave the rate three stars out of five, saying "Silly, but the funny slapstick shorts have some violence." She also describes the show as "a Looney Tunes/Tom & Jerry way, abides by the classic rules of slapstick."

=== Accolades ===
Year	Award	Category	Result	Ref
2017	Best Animated Frames Award	Case Study of the Year	Won	
2018	Best Animated Frames Award	Best Animated Episode (Indian) Best Promo	Won	
2018	Asian Academy Creative Awards	Best Short Form Content Best 2D Animated Programme or Series Best Children's Animated Programme or Series	Won	
2019	International Emmy Kids Awards	Kids: Animation	Nominated	
2019	Asian Academy Creative Awards	Best Animated Programme or Series (2D or 3D) Best Short Form Content	Won	
2020	Asian Academy Creative Awards	Best Children's Programme or Series	Won	
2022	ContentAsia Awards	Best Kids TV Programme	Won	
2022	Asian Academy Creative Awards	Best Animated Programme or Series (2D or 3D) Best Children's Programme (One Off/Series)	Won	
2023	ContentAsia Awards	Best Kids TV Programme in Asia	Won	
2024	Asian Academy Creative Awards	Best Sound	Won	
