= List of Counterfeit Cat episodes =

Counterfeit Cat is an animated television series produced by Wildseed Kids for Teletoon and Disney XD. The series revolves around the friendship of Max (Marc Wootton), a lazy yellow housecat, and Gark (Alex Kelly), an alien who disguises himself in a purple-knitted cat costume to blend in. Gark originally crashed down to Earth in his spaceship and landed in the laundry room of Betty (Kayvan Novak), an old woman who is Max's owner. Gark believes that Max is a tiger, the bravest species on Earth, despite Max's cowardice. The two often find themselves in surreal and dangerous situations due to Gark's unstable alien powers, which Max often uses to his own advantage without thinking of the consequences.

== Series overview ==
Season	Episodes	Originally released	
Season	Episodes	First released	Last released
Series	52	May 12, 2016 (UK); November 1, 2016 (CAN)	January 22, 2017 (UK); February 9, 2017 (CAN)
Shorts	11	May 24, 2016 (UK); November 30, 2016 (CAN)	March 22, 2017 (FRA)

== Episodes ==
- Note: All episodes are directed by Ben Marsaud

No.	Title	Written by	Original release date	US viewers (millions)
1	"Go Viral"	Ben Marsaud, Christina Fiumara, and Jasper Gibson	May 27, 2016 (US) May 12, 2016 (UK) November 1, 2016 (Canada)	0.23
Gark's powers go out of control after Max makes him do everything for him.
2	"Catiquette"	George Sawyer	May 27, 2016 (US) May 12, 2016 (UK) November 1, 2016 (Canada)	0.23
Max and Gark must pass a series of tests to sit in the perfect sunbathing spot.
3	"Bin Juice"	Daniel Berg & Nathan Auerbach	May 19, 2016 (UK) June 21, 2016 (US) November 2, 2016 (Canada)	N/A
Max and Gark become internationally famous as a singing duo when they are stuck together with bin juice and their screeches are mistaken for singing.
4	"Where Do All the Cat Toys Go?"	Howard Read	May 19, 2016 (UK) June 21, 2016 (US) November 2, 2016 (Canada)	N/A
Max and Gark travel to another dimension to retrieve Max's favorite cat toy.
5	"Max v Machine"	Ben Marsaud, Christina Fiumara, and Jasper Gibson	May 26, 2016 (UK) June 22, 2016 (US) November 3, 2016 (Canada)	N/A
Betty buys an automatic cat feeder.
6	"Heart of Garkness"	Reid Harrison	May 26, 2016 (UK) June 22, 2016 (US) November 3, 2016 (Canada)	N/A
Max and Gark go on a journey through the sewers.
7	"Betty Laser Eyes"	Ciaran Murtagh & Andrew Jones	June 2, 2016 (UK) June 23, 2016 (US) November 7, 2016 (Canada)	N/A
Gark attempts to give Betty laser eye surgery but fails.
8	"Furst Born"	Daniel Berg & Nathan Auerbach	June 9, 2016 (UK) June 23, 2016 (US) November 7, 2016 (Canada)	N/A
jealous of Gark's giant furballs, Max uses a furball enhancer. However it goes wrong and he cannot stop coughing them up. Eventually, it turns into a creature who thinks Max and Gark are its parents.
9	"Wormhole"	Reid Harrison	June 13, 2016 (UK) June 24, 2016 (US) November 8, 2016 (Canada)	N/A
Max jumps into Gark's wormhole, and Gark follows.
10	"Catnipped"	Dale Schott	June 11, 2016 (UK) June 24, 2016 (US) November 8, 2016 (Canada)	N/A
A full moon turns Max crazy.
11	"Hang in There"	Kyle Hart	June 20, 2016 (UK) June 27, 2016 (US) November 9, 2016 (Canada)	N/A
Max and Gark are convinced the world is going to end.
12	"Wart Attack"	George Sawyer	June 23, 2016 (UK) June 27, 2016 (US) November 9, 2016 (Canada)	N/A
A wart on Betty's face turns out to be an alien warrior who's out to get Gark.
13	"The Scarlet Mark"	Richard Preddy	June 28, 2016 (US) January 5, 2017 (UK) November 14, 2016 (Canada)	N/A
While Max naps in the park, a piano falls from the sky and nearly lands on him.
14	"The Last Yogi Standing"	Josh Sager & Jerome Simpson	June 28, 2016 (US) January 5, 2017 (UK) November 14, 2016 (Canada)	N/A
While Gark hunts for treasure on a sofa, he finds an old yoga DVD.
15	"No Pranks Thanks"	Howard Read	June 29, 2016 (US) January 12, 2017 (UK) November 15, 2016 (Canada)	N/A
Max pranks Gark.
16	"The Vet"	Ciaran Murtagh & Andrew Jones	June 29, 2016 (US) January 12, 2017 (UK) November 15, 2016 (Canada)	N/A
Max chokes on one of Gark's alien cat treats.
17	"Flea Bag"	Kyle Dooley	June 30, 2016 (US) February 9, 2017 (UK) November 16, 2016 (Canada)	N/A
Max has a secret date lined up for Valentine's Day.
18	"Humanoid"	Ciaran Murtagh & Andrew Jones	June 30, 2016 (US) February 9, 2017 (UK) November 16, 2016 (Canada)	N/A
Gark convinces Max that they should find a boyfriend for Betty.
19	"Staring Dog"	Howard Read	July 1, 2016 (US) January 19, 2017 (UK) November 17, 2016 (Canada)	N/A
Staring Dog comes to stay in the apartment while Wilma is away.
20	"28 Seconds Later"	Grant Sauvé	July 1, 2016 (US) January 19, 2017 (UK) November 17, 2016 (Canada)	N/A
Gark gets sick after eating a hot dog that was on the ground.
21	"Nightmare on Cat Mountain"	Dale Schott	October 31, 2016 (US) November 10, 2016 (Canada)	N/A
Max and Gark investigate their spooky new cat mansion.
22	"Jackson 5"	Ciaran Murtagh & Andrew Jones	October 31, 2016 (US) November 10, 2016 (Canada)	N/A
Gark meets a scabby, one-armed, tatty-eared street cat.
23	"Merry Christmax"	Reid Harrison	December 3, 2016 (US) December 15, 2016 (Canada)	0.24
Max explains to Gark about how mean Santa is because he never got the toy he asked for.
24	"Low Resolutions"	Kendra Hibbert	December 3, 2016 (US) December 15, 2016 (Canada)	0.24
Betty's already struggling with her resolution on New Year's Day.
25	"Kitty Latte"	Tim Bain	January 4, 2017 (US) January 26, 2017 (UK) November 21, 2016 (Canada)	N/A
Betty is late for de-worm night, which makes Max worry.
26	"The Big One"	Ben Joseph	January 4, 2017 (US) January 26, 2017 (UK) November 21, 2016 (Canada)	N/A
Gark gets an odd message that gives him an ominous feeling.
27	"Fat Cat"	Richard Preddy	January 5, 2017 (US) February 2, 2017 (UK) November 22, 2016 (Canada)	N/A
Max's nemesis, The Cat Toy God, is again trying to prove that he's the best.
28	"Bathtub of Terror"	Andrew Burrell	January 5, 2017 (US) February 2, 2017 (UK) November 22, 2016 (Canada)	N/A
Max is terrified of looking into the bath as he's scared something terrifying will emerge.
29	"9 Lives"	Howard Read	January 6, 2017 (US) February 16, 2017 (UK) November 23, 2016 (Canada)	N/A
Max panics when he realizes he's already lost six of his nine lives. Note: The episode was adapted four months later into a game called "Counterfeit Cat: Nine Lives" which was released onto Teletoon's website.
30	"Breaking Bread"	Dale Schott	January 6, 2017 (US) February 16, 2017 (UK) November 23, 2016 (Canada)	N/A
Max and Gark harness Gark's laser-toasting powers to make the most delicious bread crumbs.
31	"Fun in the Sun"	Ciaran Murtagh & Andrew Jones	January 9, 2017 (US) November 24, 2016 (Canada)	N/A
Betty is taking a vacation and is leaving Max and Gark with her cat-obsessed daughter.
32	"Sardonians of the Galaxy"	Ciaran Murtagh & Andrew Jones	January 9, 2017 (US) November 24, 2016 (Canada)	N/A
Max is pumped for Sportsbowl Sunday. Note: This episode is a pun on Guardians of the Galaxy.
33	"Cat Box of Fear"	Howard Read	January 10, 2017 (US) November 28, 2016 (Canada)	N/A
Max is doing everything in his power to avoid Betty, who is trying to put him into his cat box.
34	"Max Me No Questions"	Josh Sager & Jerome Simpson	January 10, 2017 (US) November 28, 2016 (Canada)	N/A
Gark receives a helpful box that can answer all of his questions.
35	"Happy Earthday"	Ciaran Murtagh & Andrew Jones	January 11, 2017 (US) November 29, 2016 (Canada)	N/A
Max throws a surprise party for Gark to celebrate his first year on Earth and Throckmorton helps plan it.
36	"Zaxos Returns"	Josh Sager & Jerome Simpson	January 11, 2017 (US) November 29, 2016 (Canada)	N/A
Betty gets a wart on her nose and Max thinks this means Zaxos is back.
37	"Virtual Insanity"	Simon A. Brown	January 12, 2017 (US) November 30, 2016 (Canada)	N/A
Max and Gark battle in virtual reality, but Max leaves early and Gark tries to keep playing. Note: This is Simon A. Brown's first Counterfeit Cat episode he has written.
38	"Birthdaystruction"	Josh Sager & Jerome Simpson	January 12, 2017 (US) November 30, 2016 (Canada)	N/A
Max's birthday arrives and Betty and Gark throw him a party, but he's disappointed in the outcome.
39	"The Cat Crib"	Kyle Hart	January 13, 2017 (US) December 1, 2016 (Canada)	N/A
Max and Gark audition for a new reality show.
40	"Lost in Throckmorton"	Ciaran Murtagh & Andrew Jones	January 13, 2017 (US) December 1, 2016 (Canada)	N/A
The guys play a board game, but Max and Throckmorton don't play nicely.
41	"Dreamcatcher"	Ciaran Murtagh & Andrew Jones	January 17, 2017 (US) December 5, 2016 (Canada)	N/A
Gark feels left out when he realizes everyone else dreams.
42	"Room of Panic"	Tim Bain	January 17, 2017 (US) December 5, 2016 (Canada)	N/A
Max panics as Betty is going away for a long weekend.
43	"Mere Mortals"	Tim Bain	January 18, 2017 (US) December 7, 2016 (Canada)	0.14
Max wanders into the park and finds Gark in full personal trainer mode.
44	"The Garkest Timeline"	Sam Ruano	January 18, 2017 (US) December 7, 2016 (Canada)	0.14
Gark and the park animals are doing warm up exercises to play Trash-Ball.
45	"The Gark Knight Rises"	Ciaran Murtagh & Andrew Jones	January 19, 2017 (US) December 6, 2016 (Canada)	N/A
Max introduces Gark to his favorite superhero TV show, Wombatman. Note: This episode is a pun on The Dark Knight Rises.
46	"Any Takers?"	Josh Sager & Jerome Simpson	January 19, 2017 (US) December 6, 2016 (Canada)	N/A
Max is regaling the park crew with a story when Anton trumps him by boasting that he's friends with a celebrity dog.
47	"I, Maxine"	Josh Sager & Jerome Simpson	January 20, 2017 (US) February 3, 2017 (Canada)	N/A
Gark saves Nelson's life and is hailed as a hero, but Max becomes jealous.
48	"Gark's Got Talent"	Ciaran Murtagh & Andrew Jones	January 20, 2017 (US) February 3, 2017 (Canada)	N/A
Max is impressed when he sees Gark performing as a living statue in the park.
49	"Mirror Mirror"	Dale Schott	January 23, 2017 (US) February 7, 2017 (Canada)	N/A
Max's constant teasing of Gark rattles him so he keeps transforming into Psycho Gark.
50	"Arugula"	Josh Sager & Jerome Simpson	January 23, 2017 (US) February 7, 2017 (Canada)	N/A
When Max makes fun of Gark's inability to lie, Gark makes up the biggest lie he can think of: he has an invisible girlfriend called Arugula.
51–52	"Gone Gark"	George Sawyer	January 30, 2017 (US); January 22, 2017 (UK); February 9, 2017 (Canada)	N/A
Gark appreciates Max's unique brand of training, but desperately wishes Max would teach him how to tackle the big stuff. Guest Stars: Alexa Kahn as Jibbo and Reginald D. Hunter as Baa-Boo-Raa Note: The episode was originally titled "Sensei", but it was changed to "Gone Gark".

== Shorts ==
No.	Title	Written by	Original release date
1	"The Cat, The Alien and The Furball"	Reid Harrison	May 24, 2016 (Disney XD UK's Youtube); November 30, 2016 (Teletoon's YouTube Channel)
Max and Gark cough up furballs.
2	"The Cat, The Alien and The Dog"	Kendra Hibbert	May 24, 2016 (Disney XD UK's Youtube); November 9, 2016 (Teletoon's YouTube channel)
Max is horrified by the Staring Dog.
3	"The Cat, The Alien and The Faces"	Jerome Simpson	May 24, 2016 (Disney XD UK's Youtube); December 7, 2016 (Teletoon's YouTube channel)
Max and Gark have a face-pulling contest.
4	"The Cat, The Alien and The Litter Box"	Grant Sauvė	May 24, 2016 (Disney XD UK's Youtube); December 14, 2016 (Teletoon's YouTube channel)
Gark uses a litter box.
5	"The Cat, The Alien and The Dibs"	Kyle Hart	May 24, 2016 (Disney XD UK's Youtube); December 21, 2016 (Teletoon's YouTube channel)
Gark starts calling dibs on everything with disastrous consequences.
6	"The Cat, The Alien and The Song"	Kyle Hart	March 13, 2017 (Disney XD France's Youtube)
Max teaches Gark how to sing.
7	"The Cat, The Alien and The Costume"	Ben Marsuad	March 14, 2017 (Disney XD France's Youtube)
Max finds Gark some new costumes.
8	"The Cat, The Alien and The Remote"	Reid Harrison	March 15, 2017 (Disney XD France's Youtube)
Gark uses a remote to speed up Betty.
9	"The Cat, The Alien and The Tongue"	Tim Bain	March 20, 2017 (Disney XD France's Youtube)
Gark's tongue comes to life and rampages.
10	"The Cat, The Alien and The Apartment"	Howard Read	March 21, 2017 (Disney XD France's Youtube)
Max shows Gark around Betty's apartment.
11	"The Cat, The Alien and The Throckmorton"	Ciaran Murtaugh & Andrew Jones	March 22, 2017 (Disney XD France's Youtube)
Throckmorton films an internet video, but Max and Gark keep interrupting.
