= George & Paul =

Dutch-Flemish animation TV series

- DVD cover
- Created by: Joost van den Bosch; Erik Verkerk
- Written by: Marc Veerkamp; Jimmy Simons
- Directed by: Joost van den Bosch; Erik Verkerk
- Presented by: Thomas van Luyn
- Composer: Sander Houtman
- Country of origin: Netherlands; Belgium
- Original languages: Dutch; Flemish
- No. of seasons: 2
- No. of episodes: 26

Production
- Producers: Paul Mathot; Peter Mansveld; Thomas Hietbrink; Ben Tesseur; Steven De Beul; Koen Vermaanen
- Production companies: Ka-Ching Cartoons; Pedri Animation; Beast Animation; NTR: VRT-KETNET

Original release
- Network: NPO 3
- Release: December 1, 2016 – present

George & Paul is a Dutch-Flemish stop-motion comedy children's animated series. The series is Ka-Ching Cartoons, Pedri Animation, Beast Animation, NTR:, VRT-KETNET, and distributed by Distribution360 and The License Company.

== Premise ==
The series represents as two characters named George and Paul who are built of children's colored wooden blocks. They use their imagination to solve problems and also make things out of other wooden blocks.

The characters don't talk, but interact with each other and with a voice-over.

== Broadcast ==
The series aired on NTR's NPO 3 in the Netherlands, VRT Ketnet in Belgium, ITVBe’s LittleBe in the UK, Daeyko Kids in South Korea, Jetsen Huashi Wangju in China, Hop! and Luli TV in Israel, YLE in Finland, RTV in Slovenia and TVNZ Kidzone in New Zealand.

=== Release ===
The series streams at the Toronto International Film Festival as part of the event “Reel Rascals: Stories Delight”.

=== Trivia ===
The series were inspired by the cartoony stop-motion animations created by the Oscar winning Hungarian animator George Pal.
