= Sayed Android =

- سيد أندرويد
- No. of seasons: 1
- No. of episodes: 30

Original release
- Release: June 6, 2016

Sayed Android (Arabic: سيد أندرويد) is an Egyptian animated comedy television series that was shown during Ramadan in 2016. The series stars Mohamed Henedi, Alaa Morsy, Engy Wegdan, Amr Abd Al-Aziz, Eman El-Sayed, and Taher Abu Lela. The series was directed by Sayed Essawy and is his first animated work.

== Synopsis ==
Comic scenes of love, friendship, and enmity play out in a world of anthropomorphic items in cyberspace.

== Cast ==
- Mohamed Henedi
- Alaa Morsy
- Engy Wegdan
- Amr Abd Al-Aziz
- Eman El-Sayed
- Taher Abu Lela
- Tarek Abdel Aziz
- Mohamed Tharwat

== Select episode titles ==
- Episodes 1–2: Web Planet
- Episode 3: The Market
- Episode 4: Al-Zaabeel
- Episode 5: Apache
- Episode 6: Microfilm
- Episode 7: Tiki Taka
- Episode 8: Lie Detector
- Episode 9: The Party
- Episode 10: Depressing Bomb
- Episode 11: Oceans 4
- Episode 12: The Armistice
- Episode 13: The Open Institute
- Episode 14: The Egyptian Monster
- Episode 15: We Don't Want to Talk About the Past
- Episode 16: The Return of the Apache
- Episode 18: Kandy
