= Counterfeit Cat =

British-Canadian animated television series

- Genre: Comedy; Adventure; Surreal comedy Science fiction
- Created by: Andrew Lavery
- Based on: Characters by Andrew Lavery
- Developed by: Aardman Animations; Cristina Fiumara; Ben Marsaud
- Directed by: Ben Marsaud
- Voices of: Marc Wootton; Alex Kelly; Kayvan Novak; Sandra Dickinson; Katherine Ryan; Kyle Soller; Adam Buxton; Adam Long; Myles McLeod; Kerry Shale
- Composers: Bedtracks Inc. Alex Greggs; Drew Snyder
- Countries of origin: United Kingdom; Canada
- Original language: English
- No. of seasons: 1
- No. of episodes: 52 (list of episodes)

Production
- Executive producers: Miles Bullough; Jesse Cleverly; Andrea Gorfolova; Frank Saperstein
- Producer: Sarah Mattingly
- Editors: Nikk Fielden; Dan Williamson
- Running time: 12–19 minutes
- Production companies: Wildseed Kids; Tricon Kids & Family; Aardman Animations; Atomic Cartoons

Original release
- Network: Disney XD (UK and US); Teletoon (Canada)
- Release: 12 May 2016 – 22 January 2017

Counterfeit Cat is an animated television series developed by Aardman Animations, Cristina Fiumara, and Ben Marsaud. The series is produced by Wildseed Kids, Tricon Kids & Family, and Aardman Animations in association with Teletoon, with the participation of Disney XD, and with animation provided by Atomic Cartoons. The series follows the lives of a Manx cat named Max and an alien named Gark as they live in an apartment alongside her animal friends, aliens, humans and many more zany adventures together.

The series first premiered on Disney XD in the United Kingdom on 12 May 2016. In Canada, it premiered on 1 November 2016. 52 episodes were produced.

== Premise ==
The series revolves around the adventures of Max (Marc Wootton), a lazy, pampered and selfish, yellow Manx cat, and his best friend Gark (Alex Kelly), a blue alien who disguised himself as a purple-knitted cat. He crashed his spaceship on Earth, landing in the laundry room of a klutzy yet kind old lady named Betty (Kayvan Novak), who is Max's owner.

She believes that Max is a tiger, the bravest species on Earth, despite Max's cowardice. Max and Gark often find themselves in surreal and dangerous situations because to Gark's unstable, bizarre powers, which Max often uses to his own advantage without thinking of the consequences.

== Episodes ==
Season	Episodes	Originally released	
Season	Episodes	First released	Last released
Series	52	May 12, 2016 (UK); November 1, 2016 (CAN)	January 22, 2017 (UK); February 9, 2017 (CAN)
Shorts	11	May 24, 2016 (UK); November 30, 2016 (CAN)	March 22, 2017 (FRA)

== Characters ==
=== Main ===
- Max (voiced by Marc Wootton) is one of two main protagonists of the series. He is a 12-year-old yellow-colored pet Manx cat who lives a cushy life in Betty's home. He often gets dragged along into dangerous and frightening adventures with Gark—adventures that he hates getting involved in. Despite taking advantage of Gark's powers it is shown several times throughout the series that he still cares for his best friend. His full name is Maximillian Fluffybottom III.
- Gark (voiced by Alex Kelly) is one of two main protagonists of the series. He is a 9-year-old blue tentacled alien who disguises himself into a purple knitted cat. He has dangerous powers, and curiosity get him and Max into misadventures because he actually thinks Max is a tiger, the bravest species in the entire world.
- Betty (voiced by Kayvan Novak) is a kindhearted but klutzy old lady who owns Max the cat and Gark the alien. In "Jackson 5", She is revealed that she had Jackson and Max (before Gark came to earth) when she was younger. She has a daughter named Jeanette and several deceased husbands as revealed in the episode, "Humanoid".
- Throckmorton (voiced by Kayvan Novak) is the artificial intelligence of Gark's ship, he is overprotective of Gark and acts like a father-figure to him, though when it comes to Max their attitudes clash.

=== Recurring ===
- Staring Dog is a Maltese dog with big eyes and greyish brown shaggy fur who rarely speaks, but he can stare at Max which makes him uncomfortable and frightened. He made his debut in "Bin Juice" in the form of a cameo.
- Ranceford (voiced by Katherine Ryan) is a Persian cat whose eyes are odd-eyed and is the leader of The Sunshine Circle of Cats and denies Max membership. Max harbors a crush on her, but like the other animals, she prefers Gark over Max.
- The Kid (voiced by Kyle Soller) is a brownish, teenage flying squirrel and troublemaker who lives in the park next to Betty's apartment and he has a sidekick named Nelson.
- The Squirrels (both voiced by Kyle Soller) are a trio of flying squirrels. They also live next to Betty's apartment.
- Nelson (voiced by Katherine Ryan) is a bred, green-colored pigeon and is The Kid's sidekick.
- Cutter (voiced by Kayvan Novak) is a cyan British Shorthair with yellow eyes, a purple hair, and his voice is freakishly campy. His name is revealed in "Cat Box of Fear".
- Anton (voiced by Kayvan Novak) is an olive green pug with black hair and an angry look at his face. In his first appearance he is a bully to Max, but in later episodes isn't a threat.
- Trash Can Hat Cat (voiced by Kayvan Novak) is a stray cat with scruffy olive green fur and he wears a trash can hat. She believes in wild conspiracy theories and is homeless.
- Zaxos (voiced by Sandra Dickinson) is a bounty hunter from the race of Wart. She set out to capture Gark along with Chico. She later appeared in "Zaxos Returns" and claims to have changed her ways, but is actually out to steal Betty's cheeks.
- Chico (voiced by Sandra Dickinson) is a young bounty hunter from the race of Wart disguised as a cute chihuahua who wants to kidnap Gark because there is a bounty on his head for driving his ship too fast.
- The Cat Toy God (voiced by Kayvan Novak) is a pink cat-like alien. He is Max's nemesis and the ruler of an alternate dimension found underneath Betty's sofa.
- Jackson (voiced by Kayvan Novak) is a single-legged, torn-eared, one-eyed street cat, he was Betty's first pet, he also blames Max for his repeated deaths due to him being jealous of his sofa and tries to kill him but, like Anton, isn't a threat in later episodes. He usually keeps dying and coming back from the dead everytime he appears in an episode.
- Wilma (voiced by Kayvan Novak) is an old lady who owns Staring Dog and one of Betty's friends.
- Jeanette (voiced by Kayvan Novak) is Betty's daughter, she occasionally looks after Max and always brings costumes, something Max hates.

=== Supporting ===
- Flargle (voiced by Sandra Dickinson) is a purple three-eyed bunny-like alien. She posts on a blog about how bad of a planet Earth is, which causes Gark to be mad. He teamed up with Chico and Zaxos in the episode, "Gark's Got Talent". Flargle makes his debut in "Mere Mortals".
- Chameleon (voiced by Kerry Shale) is a green chameleon who can turned into a super villain by Gark in "The Gark Night Rises". Chameleon paired up with Anton and Staring Dog in the episode, "Gark's Got Talent".
- Jibbo (voiced by Alexa Kahn) is a green and yellow mixed alien who, as well, one of the saviors of Baa-Boo-Raa. She is introduced in the second part of "Gone Gark".
- Baa-Boo-Raa (voiced by Reginald D. Hunter) is an alien Sensei who chose Gark to rescue the universe by joining the saviors for trainings. He is introduced in "Gone Gark".
- Jock (voiced by Kayvan Novak) is an alien who is made of a yummy meat that came from Planet Meathead. He is also one of the saviors. He makes his debut in the second part of "Gone Gark".

== Production ==
=== Development ===
On 3 December 2010, Aardman Animations originally started the development for the show for Disney. The series is Aardman's first series to use traditional animation. The development was in co-production with Wildseed Studios to complete the development for the project together while Atomic Cartoons was hired to serve animation production and Tricon Films & Television committed to distribute the series until Sonar Entertainment had taken over its distribution.

The designs for the show were provided by Antoine Birot and Raphael Chabassol based on original designs by Nick Edwards. The series is directed by Ben Marsaud and produced by Sarah Mattingley. The first season consisted of 52 episodes at ten minutes each and coincided with 11 two-minute shorts.

Ben Marsaud (who is the director of the series) was a former storyboard artist of seasons 1–3 and 6 of The Amazing World of Gumball and is the current director of Netflix's original animated sitcom, F is for Family. Miles Bullough (who is the executive producer of the series) is also an executive producer on the animated shows, Shaun the Sheep, Timmy Time, Chop Socky Chooks and the Wallace & Gromit short film, A Matter of Loaf and Death for Aardman.

=== Animation ===
The animation services for the series were handled by Atomic Cartoons through Adobe Animate. The animation company has also been known for Atomic Betty, Captain Flamingo, the sixth and seventh seasons of Max & Ruby and Angry Birds Toons.

== Broadcast ==
In the United Kingdom, the series debuted on Disney XD on 12 May 2016. It later aired on Pop, debuting on 2 October 2018, and premiered on CBBC and BBC iPlayer on 19 January 2026. In Canada, it premiered on Teletoon on 1 November 2016. In the United States, the first episode aired on Disney XD as a sneak preview on 31 May 2016, before officially premiering on 20 June 2016.

In Latin America, it began airing on Disney Channel on 19 June 2017. In Germany, it began airing on Disney XD on 17 October 2016.

As of May 2017, Sonar Entertainment has acquired the global rights to distribute the series, replacing its former owner, Tricon Films & Television.

== Reception ==
=== Accolades ===
List of awards and nominations
Award	Category	Recipient(s) and nominee(s)	Result
Royal Television Society	Best Animated Programme or Series	Counterfeit Cat	Nominated
British Academy Children's Awards	Animation	Ben Marsaud, Sarah Mattingley	Nominated
British Writers Guild Awards	Best Children's Episode	Room of Panic by Tim Bain	Won
