= Harry & Bunnie =

- Genre: Slapstick comedy Fantasy
- Created by: Edmund Chan; Raye Lee
- Directed by: AhLoong
- Creative director: Cheong Siew Wai
- Opening theme: "Harry and Bunnie"
- Composers: Adelaine Hoh; Darshan Shah; Ken Hor; Lo Shi Seng
- Country of origin: Malaysia
- Original language: None
- No. of seasons: 1
- No. of episodes: 78

Production
- Executive producers: Edmund Chan; Raye Lee
- Running time: 6-7 minutes
- Production company: Animasia Studio

Original release
- Network: Disney Channel (Southeast Asia)
- Release: May 20, 2016

Related
- Chuck Chicken

Harry & Bunnie is a Malaysian animated television series created by the Malaysian-based company, Animasia Studio. It follows young wannabe magician Harry who invents magical tricks to impress his friends, but always in vain. Meanwhile, his mischievous stage rabbit Bunnie always ends up stealing the limelight with his ongoing mission to steal Harry's magic wand. Harry always creates elaborate plans to take back his wand but always fails in the end.

The show is a non-dialogue slapstick comedy with 78 episodes with all of them 7 minutes each. It was formerly on Netflix, Disney Channel, and other channels.

== Characters ==
=== Main ===
- Harry — A young wannabe magician who auditions his way into a magical school in the first episode. Harry wants very much to impress others with his magical skills; unfortunately, though inventive, he is far less talented and lucky in pulling off magic than his mischievous former stage rabbit, Bunnie, who steals his magic wand in the first episode, becoming the school's star pupil. Thereafter Bunny seems always to steal Harry's limelight. Harry is largely motivated by his desire to regain the magic wand and to humiliate Bunnie, and is very unscrupulous in how he attempts to do so. Nevertheless, Harry will occasionally team up with Bunnie if they are threatened by a common danger (such as the school's security guard); sometimes Harry will even display a soft side and go so far as to cooperate with Bunnie to do some charitable act, such as rescuing a baby Yeti or delivering toys to children. He has dark blue eyes and hair (a running gag in the show is for his quiff to become mussed and for Harry to tease it desperately back into place) and wears a magician's black tailcoat with the sleeves rolled up at the elbows, a black bowtie, a red cummerbund, dark gray trousers, and red sneakers.
- Bunnie — A naughty rabbit that used to be Harry's magic prop in his performance. Having stolen Harry's magic wand after considerable provocation, he thereafter becomes the magical school's best student, and the favorite of the Headmistress, Penny. Bunnie has a ravenous appetite for carrots, though he quickly appears to develop almost as great an appetite for humiliating and annoying Harry. He even appears to be very popular with his fellow students; later in the series, he develops a romance with a pink kitten named Katty. Bunnie is a white rabbit with a brace on his front teeth, dark blue eyes, a sky blue shirt with a pale yellow stripe, a black bow tie, and black shorts.

=== Recurring ===
- Penny — Headmistress of the magical school. She appears to be a skillful magician, a strict disciplinarian (she has a tendency to restore order by blowing an airhorn), and a good teacher, who takes her pupils on numerous field trips and outings. She is particularly fond of Bunnie, whereas she appears to have a grudge against Harry—most likely because of his continual destruction of property, both the school's and her own—though she shows an unexpected tenderness for him when he is turned into a baby. Penny has scanty gray hair, glasses, dentures (several episodes revolve around her desire for new and better ones), and a rather hunched figure; she wears a bejeweled turban, gold earrings and bracelets, and a wisteria violet and magenta robe; her wand is gold-colored with an emerald green crystal on the end.
- The Security Guard — He ruthlessly enforces discipline for the school. The guard shows absolutely no favoritism and is just as likely to thwart Bunnie as he is Harry or any other student, though Harry does have a particular tendency to provoke him, particularly when he is off duty. The Guard is a husky, muscular man with a thick black mustache and frizzy black hair; he usually wears a blue uniform.
- Bob Bully — A male student; he is strong and continually hungry, often shown consuming over-sized hero sandwiches. He is stout, with red hair, center-parted and combed into "wings"; he wears a black top hat with a red hat-ribbon, a magician's black tailcoat (which also resembles a black motorcycle jacket, a white T-shirt with a lightning bolt logo, bluejeans, and light red sneakers. When the students engage in team sports, Bob will often be on Harry's side. In "The Pet Competition" we see that Bob has a pet cat.
- Fiona — A female student. She is tall and thin, with a mulberry ponytail and mint green stars on her cheeks. She wears a blue pointed hat with green stars, a green hair ribbon, mint green star-shaped earrings, a jeans jacket rolled up at the elbows, a mint green top and short mulberry skirt with a broad black belt, mint green and white striped knee socks, and mulberry sneakers.
- Samy — A male student. He is very often seen playing the pungi, charming his pet Indian cobra (to mixed results), or enchanting ropes à la the Indian rope trick. Samy is tall and thin, with black hair; he wears a red turban with a gold stripe and an aigrette with a royal purple jewel and a white plume, a purple earring, a long blue Nehru jacket with gold collar, cuffs, hem, and buttons, light gray trousers, and black sneakers.
- Susan — A female student. She is very short, slant-eyed, and buck-toothed, with bowl-cut hair, electric blue behind and hot pink in front. She wears a violet top hat with sea green and hot pink polka-dots and a black hat-ribbon, large round sea-green spectacles, a violet haori over a short hot pink kimono, a light blue obi, and purple sneakers. She nearly always carries a hot pink folding hand fan.

== Episodes ==
- New Magical Star
- The Orientation
- Secret Ingredients
- Locker 101
- Prison Break
- Penny's Birthday Surprise
- Garden Mayhem
- Visit the Zoo
- The Early Bird
- The Magical Sports Day
- The Double
- Pet Competition
- Locker 102
- Treasure Hunt
- When Hate Becomes Love
- The Dental Day
- Harry's Magic Wand
- The Camping Trip
- Ice Cream War
- Bunnie's Love
- Best Picnic Spot in the World
- Castaway
- A Day at the Gym
- Brobdingnag in the Room
- Showdown at the Carnival
- Bunnie's Secret Farm
- Movies World Adventure
- Video Games Chaos
- Fishing Day
- Desert Fantasia
- Lost in the Desert
- Vampire Phobia
- Back to the Jurassic
- Soccer Madness
- Amazon Trekking
- Black Friday Super Sales
- Bunnie on Diet
- The Xmas Express
- Martial Arts Academy
- Genie in the Lamp
- Saving Private Carrot
- Way of the Superhero
- The Invisible Hoodie
- Space Centre Adventure
- A Night in the Museum
- Inside Bob
- Scout's Job Week
- Save Our Water
- Happy Easter
- Part Time Farmer
- The Cyborg Harry
- The Lost Baby
- Bunnie Jones
- Fans in Action
- Charity Fund-Raising
- The Haunted House
- The Puppetbot
- Vending Machine War
- Romance of the Sand Kingdoms
- Everest Expedition
- The Great Magical Raft Race
- Treasure Island
- Harry the Giant
- Warrior of the 5 Elements
- Hypnotized Bunnie
- The Magical Circus
- Penny the Nanny
- Golfing Madness
- From Ocean with Love
- A Crazy Halloween
- Rabbit Brotherhood
- Bowling Power
- The Great Singing Contest
- The Dancing Queen
- The Cruise Day
- The Fugitive
- Earth Day Apocalypse
- Harry's Magic Brush
