= Word Party =

American animated children's streaming television series

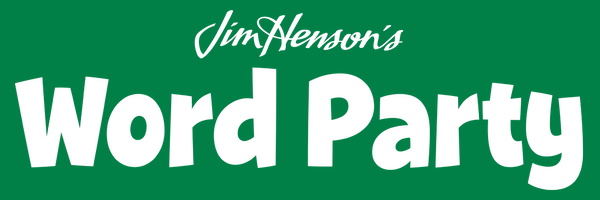
- Genre: Educational
- Created by: Alex Rockwell
- Voices of: Dorien Davies; Victor Yerrid; Donna Kimball; John Tartaglia; Alice Dinnean; Risa Mei
- Narrated by: Patina Miller
- Theme music composer: Alex Geringas, Mike Himelstein, Dena Diamond
- Opening theme: "Word Party"
- Ending theme: "Word Party" (instrumental)
- Composer: Michael Silversher and Patty Silversher
- Country of origin: United States
- Original language: English
- No. of seasons: 5
- No. of episodes: 60

Production
- Executive producers: Lisa Henson; Halle Stanford; Alex Rockwell
- Production location: Clubhouse
- Running time: 13 minutes
- Production company: The Jim Henson Company

Original release
- Network: Netflix
- Release: July 8, 2016 – March 2, 2021

Word Party (also known as Jim Henson's Word Party) is an American animated children's television series that started streaming on Netflix in 2016. The series was created by The Jim Henson Company, using the Henson Digital Puppetry Studio.

== Overview ==
The vocabulary-building program features a group of five young animals, Kip the wallaby (John Tartaglia), Bailey the elephant (Victor Yerrid), leader Franny the cheetah (Donna Kimball), the mascot Lulu the panda (Dorien Davies), and Tilly the tortoise (Alice Dinnean), "as they sing, dance and play." The show invites young viewers to help teach the baby animals new words, practice these new words themselves, and celebrate these achievements with a "Word Party!", hence the series' title name. The show is narrated by Patina Miller.

== Characters ==
Main

- Kip is a wallaby joey and is the second oldest of the group. He loves to jump and is the jokester of the group. Sometimes when he tries to guess what the other babies are feeling, or what someone else is trying to tell him, he has trouble finding out what it is, with him comically and humorously failing. With help from the other babies and Word Wally, he finds the words for what someone else is feeling or saying.
- Franny is a cheetah cub and the eldest and leader of the group. Lulu is her best friend. Sometimes, when she is in a low mood, it is difficult for the others to tell what is bothering her, but she accepts help when she needs it most. She has stated several times, "Well, I am the oldest."
- Bailey is an elephant calf who loves to pretend. He is the middle aged of the group. He has a big heart and cares a lot about the other babies. He often helps the other babies when they do not have the words to express their feelings.
- Lulu is a panda cub who is the second youngest of the group. Due to being younger than the other babies (with the exception of Tilly), it is often difficult for her to fully express how she is feeling. She finds it harder to find the necessary words to express what she wants to say, occasionally does not speak in full sentences, and gets frustrated when others cannot understand her.
- Tilly is a Mandarin-speaking baby tortoise who appears as a main character in season 4. She is the smallest of the babies. Due to being the youngest of the group alongside Lulu, she is often soft-spoken and does not talk very much, though words cannot always describe what she wants to express.

== Episodes ==
=== Series overview ===
Season	Episodes	Originally released
1	14	July 8, 2016
2	12	October 21, 2016
3	14	October 6, 2017
4	10	January 21, 2020
5	10	March 2, 2021

=== Season 1 (2016) ===
No. overall	No. in season	Title	Original release date
1	1	"Meet the Babies"	July 8, 2016
2	2	"Down on the Farm"	July 8, 2016
3	3	"To the Moon!"	July 8, 2016
4	4	"The Slow Racer"	July 8, 2016
5	5	"Burst My Balloon"	July 8, 2016
6	6	"The Color Monster"	July 8, 2016
7	7	"Ouch!"	July 8, 2016
8	8	"Tickle Time"	July 8, 2016
9	9	"Tired Lulu"	July 8, 2016
10	10	"An Egg-Cellent Surprise"	July 8, 2016
11	11	"No Cupcakes For Lunch"	July 8, 2016
12	12	"The Lost Apple"	July 8, 2016
13	13	"A Job For Lulu"	July 8, 2016
14	14	"Bailey the Helper"	July 8, 2016

=== Season 2 (2016) ===
No. overall	No. in season	Title	Original release date
15	1	"Bailey's Garden"	October 21, 2016
16	2	"Come Back, Butterfly!"	October 21, 2016
17	3	"Lights Out"	October 21, 2016
18	4	"The Opposite of Fun"	October 21, 2016
19	5	"Lulu's Special Pillow"	October 21, 2016
20	6	"Building Blocks"	October 21, 2016
21	7	"Nighttime Is for Sleeping"	October 21, 2016
22	8	"Too Loud"	October 21, 2016
23	9	"The Taste Test"	October 21, 2016
24	10	"Kip Comes to His Senses"	October 21, 2016
25	11	"A Playground Parade"	October 21, 2016
26	12	"Everybody Is Good at Something"	October 21, 2016

=== Season 3 (2017) ===
No. overall	No. in season	Title	Original release date
27	1	"Hit It!"	October 6, 2017
28	2	"Raffe's Broken Wheel"	October 6, 2017
29	3	"Hey, Have You Heard? It's the Word Potty!"	October 6, 2017
30	4	"Mind Your Manners"	October 6, 2017
31	5	"Art from the Heart"	October 6, 2017
32	6	"Stormy Weather"	October 6, 2017
33	7	"Fuzzy Furry Friendships"	October 6, 2017
34	8	"Franny’s Fractions"	October 6, 2017
35	9	"A Bed for Raffe"	October 6, 2017
36	10	"The Stink Monster"	October 6, 2017
37	11	"Nice Moves!"	October 6, 2017
38	12	"A Very Buggy Picnic"	October 6, 2017
39	13	"Ocean Chase"	October 6, 2017
40	14	"Shop Til You Drop"	October 6, 2017

=== Season 4 (2020) ===
No. overall	No. in season	Title	Original release date
41	1	"The Big Surprise"	January 21, 2020
42	2	"You Say Hello, I Say Nĭ hăo"	January 21, 2020
43	3	"Walk the Walk!"	January 21, 2020
44	4	"Hungry Thirsty Tilly"	January 21, 2020
45	5	"Clickety Clock-tastrophe"	January 21, 2020
46	6	"Tilly the Toy"	January 21, 2020
47	7	"Lulu's Travels"	January 21, 2020
48	8	"What's Mine is Yours"	January 21, 2020
49	9	"The Upside Down Smile"	January 21, 2020
50	10	"Bath Time!"	January 21, 2020

=== Season 5 (2021) ===
No. overall	No. in season	Title	Original release date
51	1	"Blast Off!"	March 2, 2021
52	2	"Dinosaurs on the Playground!"	March 2, 2021
53	3	"The Lost Treasure"	March 2, 2021
54	4	"A World Without Colors"	March 2, 2021
55	5	"What About Lulu?"	March 2, 2021
56	6	"Food Fight!"	March 2, 2021
57	7	"The Loudest Sneeze"	March 2, 2021
58	8	"Spread the Love"	March 2, 2021
59	9	"The Courageous Colors!"	March 2, 2021
60	10	"All in the Family"	March 2, 2021

== Word Party Presents: Math! ==
Word Party Presents: Math! is the short-lived sequel to the series, teaching math. It was released on Netflix on December 28, 2021. A sneak peek of the sequel was uploaded on the Netflix Jr channel on December 1, 2021.

=== Episodes ===
No. overall	No. in season	Title	Original release date
1	1	"No Fair!/Meet Cookitybot!"	December 28, 2021
2	2	"Counting Cupcakes/Kip's Moment of Ten"	December 28, 2021
3	3	"The Shape Hunt/The Right Triangle"	December 28, 2021
4	4	"A House for Raffe/Twinkle, Twinkle, Little Shapes"	December 28, 2021
5	5	"A Pattern for Friendship/Tilly Dancer"	December 28, 2021
6	6	"Pandazilla!/All-Star Mathletes"	December 28, 2021
7	7	"Raffes for All!/Breaking Eggs"	December 28, 2021
8	8	"Let Tilly Eat Cake/The Tallest Baby"	December 28, 2021
9	9	"Ready Player Tilly/The Gold Rush"	December 28, 2021
10	10	"Kip the Mathemagician/Let Me Count the Ways"	December 28, 2021

== See also ==
- List of original programs distributed by Netflix
