= Kazoops! =

Animated television series

- Genre: Preschool; Comedy
- Created by: Darren Price; Anthony Aston; Patrick Egerton; David Webster; Scott Langley
- Written by: David Ingham (Note: Ingham also credited as a Head Writer.); Gillian Corderoy; Alex Williams; Lisa Akhurst
- Directed by: Steve Moltzen
- Voices of: Reece Pockney; Scott Langley; Alex Babic
- Opening theme: "Kazoops!"
- Ending theme: "Kazoops!" (instrumental)
- Composer: Scott Langley
- Countries of origin: Australia; Malaysia; United Kingdom
- Original language: English
- No. of series: 3
- No. of episodes: 78

Production
- Executive producers: Patrick Egerton; Zeno Gabing; Juhaidah Joemin; Jackie Edwards; Chris Rose; David Webster
- Producers: Patrick Egerton; Libbie Doherty
- Editors: Simon Klaebe; Daryl Davies
- Running time: 6–7 minutes
- Production companies: Cheeky Little Media; Giggle Garage; Mighty Nice; Nexus Studios

Original release
- Network: CBeebies
- Release: 20 June 2016 – 3 November 2017
- Network: ABC Kids
- Release: 1 August – 27 October 2016
- Network: Netflix
- Release: 2 September – 27 October 2016

Kazoops! is a children's animated television series produced by Cheeky Little Media, Giggle Garage, Mighty Nice and Nexus Studios for ABC Kids and CBeebies. The series' first season, comprising 13 episodes, was released on Netflix on September 2, 2016.

== Premise ==
The series follows six-year-old Monty Kazoops, a boy with a vibrant imagination, and his best friend Jimmy Jones, the family pet pig. In each episode, Monty encounters a preconception about life and embarks on a fantastical imaginary adventure to challenge it, gaining a new perspective.

== Characters ==
- Reece Pockney as Monty, a 6-year-old boy. He has youthful enthusiasm and curiosity at every turn.
- Scott Langley as Jimmy Jones, A domesticated pig who is Monty's sidekick and best friend.
- Alex Babic as Stan, Monty’s father.
- Gemma Harvey and Teresa Gallagher as Violet, Monty’s mother.
- Jessica Hann as Jeanie, Monty’s older sister.
- Emma Tate (Series 1) and Shelley Longworth (Series 2–3) as Gran.
- Samantha, Elke, Willow and Finn Langley provide additional voices for the series.

== Production ==
Commissioned by the Australian Broadcasting Corporation and the BBC, Kazoops! was co-produced by Cheeky Little Media, an Australian animation studio based in Sydney and Giggle Garage, a Malaysian animation studio based in Cyberjaya, Selangor. Production began in April 2015.

The series' character designs, storyboards, music and post-production were handled in Australia, while the animation was produced in Malaysia. The script and voice recording were done in the United Kingdom. British child development expert, Jacqueline Harding served as the educational consultant.

Each episode features its own original songs, written and performed by Australian musician, Scott Langley. It is also one of the two Cheeky Little Media productions to receive global distribution.

== Episodes ==
During its run, Kazoops! spanned 3 series and 78 episodes. All episodes are directed by Steve Moltzen.

Series	Episodes	Originally released	
Series	Episodes	First released	Last released
1	26	1 August 2016	30 August 2016
2	26	31 August 2016	29 September 2016
3	26	30 September 2016	27 October 2016

=== Series 1 (2016) ===
No. overall	No. in series	Title	Storyboarded by (Note: Information is taken from the opening credits of each episode.)	Written by	Original release date
1	1	"Animal Pals"	Greg Ingram	David Ingham	1 August 2016
2	2	"Backyard Beach"	Cindy Scharka	Lee Pressman	2 August 2016
3	3	"Dinosaurus Games"	Darren Keating; Tang Ngack Lee	Matt Baker	3 August 2016
4	4	"Tiny Little Me"	Tang Ngack Lee	Matt Baker	4 August 2016
5	5	"Cosmic Clean-Up"	Tang Ngack Lee	Lisa Akhurst	5 August 2016
6	6	"Clothes for Jimmy"	Greg Holfield	Matt Baker	6 August 2016
7	7	"Monsters"	Cindy Scharka	David Ingham	8 August 2016
8	8	"Follow the Rules"	Tang Ngack Lee	Alex Williams	9 August 2016
9	9	"Half a Pair"	Cindy Scharka	Gillian Corderoy	10 August 2016
10	10	"The Beautiful Game"	Chris Hauge	Gillian Corderoy	11 August 2016
11	11	"Matching Socks"	Greg Holfield; Constance Chew	David Ingham	12 August 2016
12	12	"Flower Power"	Tang Ngack Lee	Alex Williams	13 August 2016
13	13	"Rainy Day"	Anne Yi	Alex Williams	15 August 2016
14	14	"Best Bike in the World"	Chris Hauge	Gillian Corderoy	16 August 2016
15	15	"Piggy Portrait"	Constance Chew	Matt Baker	17 August 2016
16	16	"The Night's Alright"	Hiromi Kakinuma	Alex Williams	18 August 2016
17	17	"Daredevil Dude"	Mike Zarb	Lisa Akhurst	19 August 2016
18	18	"Cubby House"	Chris Hauge	Alex Williams	20 August 2016
19	19	"Happy Ordinary Day"	Chris Hauge	Alex Williams	22 August 2016
20	20	"Coconut Safari Club"	Mike Zarb	David Ingham	23 August 2016
21	21	"Never Mending Story"	Cindy Scharka	Lee Pressman	24 August 2016
22	22	"Topsy Turvy Time"	Constance Chew	David Ingham	25 August 2016
23	23	"Pea Soup"	Tang Ngack Lee; Greg Ingram	Matt Baker	26 August 2016
24	24	"Tasty Trip"	Tang Ngack Lee; Anne Yi	Matt Baker	27 August 2016
25	25	"Star Yeti"	Hiromi Kakinuma	Alex Williams	29 August 2016
26	26	"The Incredible Kazoops!"	Peter Sheehan	Matt Baker	30 August 2016

=== Series 2 (2016) ===
No. overall	No. in series	Title	Storyboarded by	Written by	Original release date
27	1	"I Am Monty"	Constance Chew	Matt Baker	31 August 2016
28	2	"Hello Goodbye"	Mike Zarb	Alex Williams	1 September 2016
29	3	"Piggy Dreamer"	Tang Ngack Lee; Greg Ingram	David Ingham	2 September 2016
30	4	"The Queen"	Darren Keating; Patrick Burns; Steve Cooper	Matt Baker	3 September 2016
31	5	"Daydreamer Monty"	Peter Sheehan	Alex Williams	5 September 2016
32	6	"Wild Thing"	Constance Chew	Lisa Akhurst	6 September 2016
33	7	"King of the City"	Rosauro A. dela Vega; Anne Yi	Alex Williams	7 September 2016
34	8	"Different Folks"	Cindy Scharka; Tang Ngack Lee; Belynda Smith	Matt Baker	8 September 2016
35	9	"Bold Knight"	Tang Ngack Lee; Chris Hauge	Peter Hynes	9 September 2016
36	10	"Crowded House"	Mike Zarb	Lee Pressman	10 September 2016
37	11	"Silence for Stan"	Mike Chavez; Belynda Smith	Gillian Corderoy	12 September 2016
38	12	"Do Elephants Forget?"	Constance Chew; John Eyley	Lee Pressman	13 September 2016
39	13	"Dad Dancing"	Chris Hauge	Matt Baker	14 September 2016
40	14	"Techno Monty"	Tang Ngack Lee	Lisa Akhurst	15 September 2016
41	15	"Ugli Fruit"	Suren Perera; John Eyley	Lisa Akhurst	16 September 2016
42	16	"Fun Factory"	Mike Chavez; Tang Ngack Lee	Matt Baker	17 September 2016
43	17	"Fix it Mum and Dad"	Suren Perera; Richard Bailey	Gillian Corderoy	19 September 2016
44	18	"The Good Winner"	Gan Cher Kang; Richard Bailey	Matt Baker	20 September 2016
45	19	"Big and Small"	Anne Yi	Lisa Akhurst	21 September 2016
46	20	"Piggy Blues"	Erin Humiston; Tang Ngack Lee	Matt Baker	22 September 2016
47	21	"Follow the Leader"	Gan Cher Kang	Alex Williams	23 September 2016
48	22	"Hide and Seek"	Mike Chavez; Suren Perera	Alex Williams	24 September 2016
49	23	"Dr. Funny Bones"	Anne Yi	Peter Hynes	26 September 2016
50	24	"Wish List"	Suren Perera; John Eyley	Alex Williams	27 September 2016
51	25	"Round and Round"	Manny Banados; Belynda Smith	Peter Hynes	28 September 2016
52	26	"The Greatest Gift"	Chris Hauge	Lee Pressman; David Ingham	29 September 2016

=== Series 3 (2016) ===
No. overall	No. in series	Title	Storyboarded by	Written by	Original release date
53	1	"Take a Break"	Mike Zarb; Gan Cher Kang	Alex Williams	30 September 2016
54	2	"Parcel Puzzle"	Chris Hauge	Gillian Corderoy	1 October 2016
55	3	"Monty Repeats Himself"	Erin Humiston	Alex Williams	3 October 2016
56	4	"Bath Night"	Constance Chew; Manny Banados	Alex Williams	4 October 2016
57	5	"Seabed Sleepover"	Anne Yi	Lisa Akhurst	5 October 2016
58	6	"Same Old Story"	Cindy Scharka	Matt Baker	6 October 2016
59	7	"Camping"	Tang Ngack Lee	Peter Hynes	7 October 2016
60	8	"Caring Sharing Monty"	Gan Cher Kang	Alex Williams	8 October 2016
61	9	"Music Power"	Anne Yi	Alex Williams	10 October 2016
62	10	"You're Never Too Old"	Anne Yi	Peter Hynes	11 October 2016
63	11	"Fun With Clouds"	Constance Chew	Alex Williams	12 October 2016
64	12	"Car Trip"	Cindy Scharka	Alex Williams	13 October 2016
65	13	"Cousin Flora"	Tang Ngack Lee	David Ingham	14 October 2016
66	14	"Know it All"	Tang Ngack Lee; Pete Jacobs	Adam Long	15 October 2016
67	15	"Surprising Stan"	Maruna Hada	Gillian Corderoy	17 October 2016
68	16	"Pretend Piggy"	Mandy Clotworthy	Lisa Akhurst	18 October 2016
69	17	"Waiting Games"	Maruna Hada	Lisa Akhurst	19 October 2016
70	18	"Jimmy Jones Rules"	Constance Chew; Cindy Scharka	Alex Williams	20 October 2016
71	19	"Honestly, Monty"	Maruna Hada	Matt Baker	21 October 2016
72	20	"My Family"	Cindy Scharka	Alex Williams	22 October 2016
73	21	"Monty Rides Again"	Maruna Hada	Alex Williams	24 October 2016
74	22	"Purple Zappa"	Mandy Clotworthy	Gillian Corderoy	25 October 2016
75	23	"Get It Wrong to Get it Right"	Mandy Clotworthy; Cindy Scharka	Matt Baker	26 October 2016
76–78	24–26	"Middle of Somewhere"	Tang Ngack Lee; Mandy Clotworthy	David Ingham	27 October 2016
This episode has an extended running time of 21 minutes and produced as a three-part special finale.

== Broadcast ==
Kazoops! debuted on CBeebies in the United Kingdom in June 2016, followed by ABC Kids in Australia on 1 August. The series began available for streaming on Netflix starting 2 September.
