= Greatest Party Story Ever =

American animated television series

- Also known as: Greatest Party Story Ever...and Other Epic Tales; Greatest Party Story Ever: The After Party
- Genre: Comedy; Reality
- Country of origin: United States
- Original language: English
- No. of seasons: 2
- No. of episodes: 20

Production
- Running time: 22 minutes
- Production companies: Four Peaks Media Group; Den of Thieves; ShadowMachine; MTV Animation; MTV Production Development

Original release
- Network: MTV
- Release: January 14 – December 22, 2016

Greatest Party Story Ever is an American animated television series. The series premiered on MTV on January 14, 2016. Produced by Four Peaks Media Group, Den of Thieves, and animated by ShadowMachine. The program holds a TV-14 rating due to language, adult situations, and comedic violence. Episodes re-released with bonus content were titled as Greatest Party Story Ever: The After Party. The second season premiered December 1, 2016. This was the final project produced by MTV Animation.

== Plot ==
The series presents first-person narratives shared by individuals about wild parties they have attended, outrageous and bizarre events they have experienced, encounters with celebrities such as James Franco and Rihanna, crazy hookups, and highly regrettable decisions.

The stories are reenacted with unique styles of animation to enhance the humor. Other segments include viewer-submitted party photos, which were later doctored; and outrageous text conversations.

== Episodes ==
=== Series overview ===
Season	Episodes	Originally released	
Season	Episodes	First released	Last released
1	10	January 14, 2016	March 10, 2016
2	10	December 1, 2016	December 22, 2016

=== Season 1 (2016) ===
No. overall	No. in season	Title	Original release date	US viewers (millions)
1	1	"The Greatest Party Story Ever Told"	January 14, 2016	0.28
A college student makes out with the wrong woman. James Franco helps a heartbroken teen get her revenge. A teen gets traumatized by his friend's frisky grandma. A club-goer makes a mistake of putting a sparkler in her hair. High school students attend an illegal party in a penthouse apartment.
2	2	"Greatest Barf Story Ever"	January 21, 2016	0.53
A teen at a beach party learns the hard way that curry and milkshakes don't mix. Another teen opens the door without knocking to something traumatic. A wedding gets crashed by pop sensation Justin Bieber, which a superfan has a huge crush on. A college student gets wasted quickly after consuming too many beers for the first time, and ends up barfing on his love interest.
3	3	"Greatest MILF Story Ever"	January 28, 2016	0.44
A party-goer inadvertently hooks up with someone's girlfriend and their mom in the same day. A fan of Rihanna crashes her extravagant birthday party. A group of friends bring pot brownies to a theme park. Revelers at a house party become vigilantes after a neighbor's house is being robbed.
4	4	"Greatest Stripper Story Ever"	February 4, 2016	0.36
A hip-hop duo, shooting a music video in Cozumel, go to a party that went down in flames. A basketball fan hangs out with Usher at the NBA Finals in Cleveland. A group of partiers get more than what they bargained for when ordering a stripper. A high school graduate recalls a wild night that got him and his dates kicked out of prom.
5	5	"Greatest Gnome Story Ever"	February 11, 2016	0.32
A reveler recalls a moment at Coachella, leading him to a cross-country family reunion and a turning point. Two best friends steal a gnome from a frat house. A group of friends in Australia ran into a kangaroo on their way to a music festival. Fans of Kanye West sneak into the rapper's concert at a New York City casino. Spring break celebrations in Cancún for 2 college students took a bizarre turn when they were driven to a random brothel.
6	6	"Greatest Panties Story Ever"	February 18, 2016	0.48
A student on winter break with a cold wakes up to a robbery in his home. A man poses as a Taylor Swift fan to enter a private party and hangs out with said artist. A woman, drunk on a light rail meets and dates a surfer. A Halloween-themed house party goes awry when a second-floor deck collapses.
7	7	"Greatest Pee Story Ever"	February 18, 2016	0.31
A student gets revenge on his six friends for urinating on him at a house party. A reveler finds an alleged "witch" in her car. A high school graduate recalls his wacky experience with moonshine. Spring break was cut short for a group of friends after a dangerous encounter with a crocodile. A fan of Kim Kardashian was invited backstage to meet her and Kanye West.
8	8	"Greatest Wet T-Shirt Story Ever"	February 25, 2016	0.44
A party-goer loses a tooth opening a bottle of vodka. A pizza deliverer gets mistaken for a stripper by female customers. A house party in Guam takes a turn for the worse after it was raided by police. Two friends have entered outrageous contests at South Beach. A prep student wakes up in a drunk tank after celebrating his 21st birthday. After a deli screws up an order, and is threatened by a party guest, an unwanted gunslinger shows up.
9	9	"Greatest Flip Cup Story Ever"	March 3, 2016	0.55
A family reunion flip cup game turns into a random hookup for a son. A scuba diving lesson in Hawaii turned disastrous for a first-timer. Prom night was cut short due to underage drinking. A reveler gets mistaken for Ellen DeGeneres at a night club. A bartender accidentally leaves her apartment keys behind at work after attending a wild party. A college freshman was a contestant on The Price Is Right.
10	10	"Greatest Snake Story Ever"	March 10, 2016	0.38
A college senior goes undercover to catch a thief who stole his prized knife. A "mansion party" comes to a grinding halt after a boa constrictor was on the loose. A fan of Beyoncé sneaks a photo shoot with artist as her "brother". A single guy finds out too late that he dated a female gangster. A high school junior's car gets vandalized with foul graffiti while on a date. A YouTube trio was arrested for allegedly stealing a van after a day at Coney Island with their dates.

=== Season 2 (2016) ===
No. overall	No. in season	Title	Original release date	US viewers (millions)
11	1	"Snooki & Steelo"	December 1, 2016	N/A
Viewers get to ride shotgun with Jersey Shore star Snooki on her wild night out in Hollywood. A drunk partier dances with an elderly lady at a club, who turns out to be married. A grandson and his 2 friends get a wild trip after consuming absinthe. A person who impersonated Barack Obama meets the president himself. Former Playboy Playmate Amanda Cerny recounts being chased by police. Ridiculousness star Steelo Brim explains why his junk was in a glass of milk after a night out in Las Vegas.
12	2	"Travis Mills"	December 1, 2016	N/A
A reveler who loses his glasses dances blindly, hoping to find his love interest. Rapper and singer Travis Mills nearly gets married with an online date, but things took a bizarre turn. A baker was lured by his girlfriend to play the "Mr. Tickles" character at a birthday party. A wacky experience with Moroccan Hash is detailed. After a mother was given a weed-laced brownie by her daughter at Coachella, she became the life of the party. A 20-something prom goer injects vodka in his butt via a turkey baster and learns the consequences.
13	3	"Nev Schulman"	December 8, 2016	N/A
On Halloween night, comedian Brooks Wheelan escaped the police and knocked himself out on a birdbath. A female reveler's date with a sexy bartender came to a screeching halt due to the urge to use the restroom. A college-aged student gets flown to New York City by his date, who turns out to be a Nigerian princess. Catfish host Nev Schulman gives his account of wild partying gone wrong. A Bonnaroo festival-goer never realized she used her friend's tampon full of drugs until it was too late. The act of "cuckolding," when a husband desires his wife to have intimate relations with another man, is detailed.
14	4	"Lamorne Morris, Molly Tarlov & Khloe Kardashian"	December 8, 2016	N/A
Actor and comedian Lamorne Morris retrieves his girlfriend's cellphone from a restaurant in Compton with help from fellow comedian DeRay Davis. At a wedding, a lady accidentally pepper sprays herself twice. A look is taken into how a fan's admiration can lead to a meeting with Khloé Kardashian. A young male at a beach party accidentally lights a firecracker under a horse ridden by a sheriff. A robbery of a dollar store is detailed. Awkward star Molly Tarlov recounts her really awkward encounter with a fan.
15	5	"The Fat Jew, Joseph Gordon-Levitt & Lexi Atkins"	December 15, 2016	N/A
Comedian Josh "The Fat Jew" Ostrovsky details the dangers of smoking pubic hair. Two female friends check into a creepy apartment that only allows one tenant. A Joseph Gordon-Levitt fan gets in a dance-off with the actor. Former Miss Teen USA contestant Lexi Atkins is led on a wild goose chase for her smartphone. A swamp party comes to a stop when revelers encounter and wrestle a crocodile. An aspiring artist recalls his shameful experience of losing his virginity.
16	6	"Drugs, Jail & a Four Wheeler"	December 15, 2016	N/A
A pizza deliverer unknowingly takes a hit of horse tranquilizer the night before a charitiy event. A college student was led to believe it was a Legends of the Hidden Temple-themed party. A group of four's trip on a four-wheeler turns disastrous. Two pot-smoking students sold a classmate fake weed made from artificial turf. Locked up in jail for passing out drunk, a reveler shares popcorn with fellow inmates while watching a movie. Two best friends pose as a gay couple to enter a quiz show on a cruise ship to win free booze.
17	7	"Katy Perry"	December 22, 2016	N/A
A pole fitness instructor goes to the aid of a new student. A college-age camp counselor gets distracted while driving a bus full of campers. After a concert, two female best friends crash a Katy Perry meet and greet. A Saturday Night Live fan crashes a celebrity party in hopes to get on the show. A Spring Break trip to New Orleans for Mardi Gras turns into a cluster mess when two best friends run into a person with their car. Because of a hotel's new strict policy and the pressure from his boss, a hotel worker plots a big way to quit his job.
18	8	"Justin Timberlake"	December 22, 2016	N/A
A college student was given a "special" Christmas cookie before boarding a flight back home for the holidays. A sister's fear of spiders is put to the test at a magic show. A bartender was invited by his date to her father's 70th birthday party. A computer nerd hacks a Justin Timberlake look-alike competition. A man must scrub away any phallic drawings on him by his prankster friends before facing his recruit officer. A wasted customer wakes up alone in a locked bar.
19	9	"Donald Trump & Paris Hilton"	December 22, 2016	N/A
A student was caught having sex with his teacher's daughter. A student celebrating his 21st birthday becomes gradually smashed. A woman on her way to a job interview accidentally hits an elderly lady, who then asked her to take her to the mall. A lady's would-be hookup was thwarted by her roommate, which resulted in said roommate's TV being stolen. Actor and comedian Elijah Daniel was being investigated by the Secret Service for bringing something obscene to a Donald Trump rally. A reveler and his friend crash Paris Hilton's party and steal her birthday cake.
20	10	"Rob Dyrdek"	December 22, 2016	N/A
A college student blacks out at party and wakes up trying to retrace her steps of her wild night. A stoner holds a demolition party for his friends, but at a wrong structure. A bridesmaid attends the wrong wedding. The morning after a birthday party, a lady notices her drunk love interest defecating on the floor. A Rob Dyrdek impersonator was caught at a bar by a tattler. A Scottsdale, Arizona high school student recalls the naked truth about her ex-boyfriend.
