= List of Canadian animated television series =

The following is a list of animated television series originating from or animated in Canada.

== Canadian animated television series ==
For shows produced by entities that have since been re-organized, their former names are listed in brackets. All channels listed are Canadian unless otherwise noted.

=== Numerical ===
Title	Episodes	Year	Original channel	Canadian company	Note	Technique
2 Nuts and a Richard!	38	2015–2017	Télétoon la nuit	Oasis Animation		Flash
3 Amigonauts	26	2017	YTV	9 Story Media Group		Flash
6teen	93	2004–2010	Teletoon	Nelvana; Fresh TV		Flash
The 9th Life of Sherman Phelps	5	2005	YTV	Nelvana	Shown on Funpak	Flash
16 Hudson	114	2018–2022	TVOKids	Big Bad Boo		Flash

=== A ===
Title	Episodes	Year	Original channel	Canadian company	Note	Technique
Aaagh! It's the Mr. Hell Show!	13	2001–2002	BBC Two	Entertainment Group	British co-production	Flash
A Bunch of Munsch	7	1991–1992	CTV	CINAR Films	American co-production Chinese co-production Hong Kong co-production	Traditional
Abby Hatcher	51	2019–2022	TVOKids	Guru Studio; Spin Master Entertainment		CGI
ABC with Kenny G	26	2021	TVOKids	Big Bad Boo		Flash
Acadieman	26	2005–2009	Rogers TV			Traditional
Ace Lightning	39	2002–2005	CBBC	Alliance Atlantis	British co-production	CGI/Live-action
Ace Ventura: Pet Detective	41	1995–2000	CBS (Season 1-2); Nickelodeon (Season 3)	Nelvana; Funbag Animation Studios	American co-production	Traditional
Action Man	26	2000–2001	YTV	Mainframe Entertainment	American co-production	CGI
Action Pack	17	2022–present	Netflix	Mercury Filmworks	American-British co-production	CGI
The Adventures of Chuck and Friends	39	2010–2012	Treehouse TV	Nelvana	American co-production	CGI
The Adventures of Napkin Man!	60	2013–2017	CBC Kids	Breakthrough Entertainment	American co-production	Flash/Live-action
The Adventures of Paddington Bear	39	1997–2000	Teletoon	CINAR	British co-production French co-production	Traditional
The Adventures of Sam & Max: Freelance Police	13	1997–1998	YTV	Nelvana	American co-production	Traditional
The Adventures of Super Mario Bros. 3	13	1990	NBC	DIC Entertainment	American-Italian co-production	Traditional
The Adventures of Teddy Ruxpin	65	1986–1987	Syndication	Atkinson Film-Arts	American co-production	Traditional
The Adventures of Tintin	39	1991–1992	Global	Nelvana	French co-production	Traditional
Agent Binky: Pets of the Universe	52	2019–present	Treehouse TV	Nelvana		CGI
Albert the Fifth Musketeer	26	1993–1995	Canal+	Cinar	French co-production	Traditional
Alien Racers	26	2005–2006	Fox	SD Entertainment	American co-production	CGI
Alien TV	26	2020–2021	Netflix	Entertainment One	Australian co-production	CGI
Alma's Way	52	2021–present	PBS Kids	Pipeline Studios	American co-production	Flash
Almost Naked Animals	52	2011–2013	YTV	9 Story Media Group		Flash
The Amazing Adrenalini Brothers	26	2007	YTV	Studio B Productions		Flash
The Amazing Spiez!	52	2009–2012	Teletoon	Image Entertainment Corporation	French co-production	Traditional
Anatane: Saving the Children of Okura	16	2018	Unis	Tooncan	French co-production	Traditional
Anatole	26	1998–1999	YTV	Nelvana	British-French co-production	Traditional
Angela Anaconda	65	1999–2002	Teletoon	C.O.R.E.; Decode Entertainment	American co-production	Flash; Cutout; Puppet; CGI
Angry Birds: Summer Madness	36	2022–present	Netflix	Yowza! Animation	American-British-Finnish co-production	Flash
Animal Crackers	65	1997–2000	Teletoon	CINAR	American co-production French co-production	Traditional
Animal Mechanicals	73	2008–2011	CBC Kids	Halifax Film		CGI
Animism	26	2013–2014	APTN	Zeros to Heroes		Traditional
Anne of Green Gables: The Animated Series	26	2001–2002	TVOKids	Annemation Productions Inc.		Traditional
Annedroids	52	2014–2017	TVOKids	Sinking Ship Entertainment		CGI/Live-action
Anthony Ant	27	1999	YTV	Funbag Animation Studios	British co-production	Traditional
Ariol	26	2009–2010	Uris			Traditional
Arthur	253	1996–2022	TVOKids	CINAR (Seasons 1-8)/Cookie Jar Entertainment (Seasons 9-15); 9 Story Entertainment (Seasons 16-19); Oasis Animation (Seasons 20-25)	American co-production Indian co-production (Seasons 10-15); Chinese co-production (Seasons 12-15); Hong Kong (Seasons 12-15)	Traditional (Digital ink-and-paint) (Seasons 1-15); Flash (Adobe Flash (Seasons 16-19)) (Seasons 16-25); Toon Boom Harmony (Seasons 20-25); Cutout (Seasons 20-25); Puppet (Seasons 20-25)
Atomic Betty	78	2004–2008	Teletoon	Atomic Cartoons; Breakthrough Entertainment	French co-production	Flash
Atomic Puppet	26	2016–2017	Teletoon	Mercury Filmworks	French co-production	Flash
The Avengers: United They Stand	13	1999–2000	Fox Kids	Saban Entertainment	American co-production	Traditional

=== B ===
Title	Episodes	Year	Original channel	Canadian company	Note	Technique
The Babaloos	105	1994–1999	CBC Kids	CINAR	French co-production German co-production	Traditional
Babar	78	1988–1992, 2001	CBC Television (Seasons 1-2); Family Channel (Seasons 1-5)	Nelvana	French co-production	Traditional
Babar and the Adventures of Badou	65	2010–2015	YTV	Nelvana	French co-production	CGI
Babyatrice	100	2018–present	Ici TOU.TV	C'est même pas drôle		Flash
The Backyardigans	130	2004–2013	Treehouse TV	Nelvana	American co-production	CGI
Bad Dog	40	1998–2000	Teletoon	CinéGroupe	American co-production	Traditional
The Bagel and Becky Show	26	2016–2017	Teletoon	Radical Sheep Productions; Jam Filled Entertainment		Flash
Bakugan Battle Brawlers	189	2008–2012	Teletoon	Nelvana	Japanese co-production	Traditional
Bali	26	2006–2008	TVOKids	PlanetNemo Animation	Belgian-French co-production	Traditional
Bamboo Love	26	2019	TVOKids	Victory Arts		CGI
Barbie Dreamhouse Adventures	52	2018–2020	YTV	Mainframe Studios	American co-production	CGI
Barbie: It Takes Two	26	2022	YTV	Mainframe Studios	American co-production	CGI
Barbie: Life in the Dreamhouse	75	2012–2018	YouTube	Arc Productions	American co-production	CGI
Burger King	26	2000	TBA	Cinar	French co-production	Traditional
Beast Machines: Transformers	26	1999–2000	YTV	Mainframe Entertainment	American co-production	CGI
Beast Wars: Transformers	52	1996–1999	YTV	Mainframe Entertainment	American co-production	CGI
Beat Bugs	39	2016–2018	Netflix	Atomic Cartoons	Australian co-production. Seasons 1-2 only.	CGI
Bedtime Primetime Classics	12	1996	Direct-to-Video	Phoenix Animation Studios; Blye Migicovsky Productions	American co-production	Traditional
Beetlejuice	94	1989–1991	ABC; Fox Kids	Nelvana	American co-production	Traditional
Being Ian	65	2005–2008	YTV	Studio B Productions; Nelvana		Flash
Belle and Sebastian	52	2017–2019	Knowledge Network	PVP Media (Groupe PVP)	French co-production	Flash
The Bellflower Bunnies	52	2001–2010	TFI	Tooncan	French co-production	Traditional
The Berenstain Bears	40	2003–2004	Treehouse TV	Nelvana	Chinese co-production	Traditional
Best & Bester	26	2022–2023	YTV	Nelvana	Finnish co-production	Flash
Best Ed	26	2008–2009	Teletoon	9 Story Media Group		Flash
Beverly Hills Teens	65	1987	Syndication	DIC Entertainment	American co-production	Traditional
Big Blue	52	2021–2022	CBC Kids	Guru Studio		Flash
Bigfoot Presents: Meteor and the Mighty Monster Trucks	26	2006–2008	Discovery Kids	CCI Entertainment	American co-production	CGI
Bill & Ted's Excellent Adventures	21	1990–1991	CBS; Fox Kids	Hanna-Barbera; DIC Entertainment	American co-production	Traditional
Billy the Cat	52	1996–2001	Canal+	EVA Entertainment	Belgian-French-German co-production	Traditional
Birdz	13	1998–1999	CBS	Nelvana		Traditional
Bitz & Bob	44	2018–present	TVOKids	Boat Rocker Media	British co-production	CGI
The Bizarre Stories of Professor Zarbi	54	2019–2022	Télétoon la nuit	Corus Entertainment		Traditional
Bizou	36	2007	APTN	9 Story Media Group		Flash
Blake and Mortimer	26	1997–1998	Teletoon	Ellipse Animation	French co-production	Traditional
Blaster's Universe	13	2000	Teletoon	Nelvana	American-Taiwanese co-production	Traditional
Blaze and the Monster Machines	170	2014–present	Treehouse TV	Nerd Corps Entertainment (season 1); WildBrain Entertainment (seasons 2-)	American co-production	CGI
Blazing Dragons	26	1996–1998	Teletoon	Nelvana	French co-production	Traditional
Blue's Clues & You!	90	2019–present	Treehouse TV	9 Story Media Group	American co-production	CGI/Live-action
Blynk & Aazoo	42	2019–2022	TVOKids	Little Scooter Media		Flash/Live-action
Bo on the Go!	55	2007–2009	CBC Kids	Halifax Film		CGI
Bob & Doug	15	2009–2011	Global	Animax Entertainment		Flash
Bob and Margaret	52	1998–2001	Global TV	Nelvana	British co-production	Traditional
Bob Morane	26	1998–1999	Canal+		French co-production	Traditional
Bolts & Blip	26	2010–2011	Teletoon	ToonBox Entertainment	South Korean co-production	CGI
Boule et Bill	104	2004		Tooncan	French co-production	Traditional
Bounty Hunters	13	2013	CMT	Muse Entertainment	American co-production	Flash
The Boy	25	2004–2005	YTV	Tooncan		Traditional
Braceface	78	2001–2004	Teletoon	Nelvana	Chinese co-production	Traditional
Brady's Beasts	26	2005–2006	YTV	Toon Factory	British-French co-production	Traditional
Brats of the Lost Nebula	13	1998–1999	YTV	Decode Entertainment	American co-production	CGI
The Bravest Knight	13	2019	Hulu	Big Bad Boo	American co-production	Flash
Bravest Warriors	82	2012–2018	Teletoon	Nelvana	American co-production	Flash
Bromwell High	13	2005	Teletoon	Decode Entertainment	British co-production	Flash
The Brothers Grunt	31	1994–1995	MTV	A.k.a. Cartoon	American co-production	Traditional
Bruno and the Banana Bunch	26	2007–2008	CBC Kids	Cuppa Coffee Studios		Flash
Bubble Guppies	129	2011–2023	Treehouse TV	WildBrain Entertainment (season 1); Nelvana (seasons 2-4); Jam Filled Entertainment (season 5-)	American co-production	CGI
Builder Brothers Dream Factory	13	2023–present	Treehouse TV	Sinking Ship Entertainment		CGI
The Busy World of Richard Scarry	65	1994–1997	Family Channel	CINAR Films	American co-production French co-production Chinese co-production	Traditional
Busytown Mysteries	52	2007–2010	CBC Kids	Cookie Jar Group	Singaporean co-production (Season 2)	Flash
By the Rapids	26	2008–2012	APTN	Big Soul Productions		Traditional

=== C ===
Title	Episodes	Year	Original channel	Canadian company	Note	Technique
C.L.Y.D.E.	26	1990–1991	Family Channel	CINAR Films	French co-production	Traditional
Cadillacs and Dinosaurs	13	1993–1994	YTV	Nelvana	American co-production	Traditional
Caillou	92	1997-2003, 2006-2011	Teletoon (seasons 1-4); Treehouse TV (season 5)	CINAR (Seasons 1-3); 9 Story Entertainment (Season 4); Nelvana (Season 4); Sardine Productions (Season 5)	Chinese co-production (Season 3); Hong Kong co-production (Season 3); South African co-production (Season 5)	Traditional (Cel (Season 1)/Digital ink-and-paint (Seasons 1-3)) (Seasons 1-3); Flash (Adobe Flash (Season 4)) (Seasons 4-5); Toon Boom Harmony (Season 5); Cutout (Season 5); Puppet (Season 5)
Camp Candy	39	1989–1992	NBC	DIC Entertainment	American co-production	Traditional
Camp Lakebottom	65	2013–2017	Teletoon	9 Story Media Group		Flash
Captain Flamingo	52	2006–2010	YTV	Atomic Cartoons; Breakthrough Entertainment	Filipino co-production	Flash
Captain N: The Game Master	34	1989–1991	NBC	DIC Entertainment	American co-production	Traditional
Captain Star	13	1997–1998	Teletoon	Cosgrove Hall Films	British co-production	Traditional
Care Bears	11	1985	Syndication	DIC Entertainment	American co-production	Traditional
The Care Bears Family	49	1986–1988	Global	Nelvana	American co-production	Traditional
Care Bears: Unlock the Magic	49	2019–2020	Family Jr.	Copernicus Studios	American co-production	Flash
Carl²	65	2005–2011	Teletoon	Portfolio Entertainment		Flash
Carland Cross	26	1996–1997	Télétoon+	Les Armateurs	French co-production	Traditional
Carmen Sandiego	19	2019–2021	Netflix	DHX Media	American co-production	Flash
Cartoon Sushi	15	1997–1998	MTV	a.k.a. Cartoon	American co-production	Traditional
The Cat in the Hat Knows a Lot About That!	80	2010–2018	CBC Kids	Portfolio Entertainment	American-British co-production	Flash
Celebrity Deathmatch (revival series)	16	2006–2007	MTV2	Cuppa Coffee Studios	American co-production	Stop-motion
Chaotic	40	2006–2008	Teletoon	Bardel Entertainment	American co-production. Season 1 only.	Flash
Charley and Mimmo	65	1999–2002	Treehouse TV		Belgian-French co-production	Traditional
Charlie's Colorforms City	39	2019–2022	Netflix	DHX Studios	American co-production	CGI
Chilly Beach	65	2003–2008	CBC Television	March Entertainment		Flash
Chip and Potato	28	2018–present	Family Jr.	WildBrain Studios	British co-production	Flash
Chirp	52	2015–2017	CBC Kids	Sinking Ship Entertainment		Flash
Chop Chop Ninja	20	2018	Teletoon	Sardine Productions; Gamerizon		Flash
Chop Chop Ninja Challenge	40	2014–2015	Teletoon	Sardine Productions; Gamerizon		Flash
Chop Socky Chooks	26	2007–2008	Teletoon	Decode Entertainment; Starz Animation	British co-production	CGI
Chuck's Choice	20	2017	YTV	DHX Media/Vancouver		Flash
Clang Invasion	52	2007–2009	YTV	Decode Entertainment	Chinese-Singaporean co-production	Flash
Class of the Titans	52	2005–2008	Teletoon	Studio B Productions; Nelvana		Traditional
Clifford the Big Red Dog	39	2019–2021	Knowledge Network	9 Story Media Group	American co-production	Flash
Clone High	13	2002–2003	Teletoon at Night	Nelvana	American co-production	Traditional
Cloudy with a Chance of Meatballs	52	2017–2018	YTV	DHX Media	American co-production	Flash
Coconut Fred's Fruit Salad Island	13	2005–2006	Teletoon	Warner Bros. Animation	American co-production	Flash
Committed	13	2001	CTV	Nelvana		Traditional
Conan the Adventurer	65	1992–1993	Syndication	Sunbow Entertainment	American-French co-production	Traditional
Coolman	5	2005	YTV	Nelvana	Shown on Funpak	Flash
COPS	65	1988	Syndication	DIC Entertainment	American co-production	Traditional
Corduroy	26	2000–2001	TVOKids	Nelvana		Traditional
Corn & Peg	40	2019–2020	Treehouse TV	Nelvana		Traditional
Corner Gas Animated	13	2018–2021	The Comedy Network	Smiley Guy Studios		Traditional
Counterfeit Cat	26	2016–2017	Teletoon	Tricon Kids & Family	British co-production	Flash
The Country Mouse and the City Mouse Adventures	52	1998–1999	TVOKids	Cinar	French co-production	Traditional
Crash Canyon	26	2011–2013	Teletoon at Night	Breakthrough Entertainment		Flash
Crashbox	52	1999–2000	HBO Family	Cuppa Coffee Animation	American co-production	Stop-motion
Creative Galaxy	36	2013–2019	Knowledge Network	9 Story Media Group	American co-production	CGI
Creepschool	26	2004	Teletoon	Cinar	French co-production	Traditional
Cupcake & Dino: General Services	26	2018–2019	Netflix	Entertainment One	Brazilian co-production	Flash
The Cuphead Show!	36	2022–present	Netflix	Studio MDHR	American co-production	Traditional
Curious George		1982	Nickelodeon	Atkinson Film-Arts	American co-production	Stop-motion
Cyberchase	140	2002–present	PBS Kids; PBS Kids Go!	Nelvana (seasons 1-5); PIP Animation Services (season 6-present)	American co-production	Traditional (Digital ink-and-paint) (Seasons 1-5); Flash (Adobe Flash) (Season 6-present)
Cybersix	13	1999	Teletoon	NoA; TMS-Kyokuichi		Traditional

=== D ===
Title	Episodes	Year	Original channel	Canadian company	Note	Technique
D'Myna Leagues	27	2000–2003	YTV	Studio B Productions		Traditional
D.N. Ace	40	2019–2020	Teletoon	Nelvana		Traditional
Da Boom Crew	4	2004	Kids' WB	Jambalaya Studios	American-German co-production	Traditional
Da Jammies	13	2015	Netflix	Toon Farm Animation LLC.	American co-production	CGI
Daft Planet	13	2002	Teletoon	CinéGroupe		Flash
Danger Mouse	49	2018–2019	CBBC	Boat Rocker Studios	British co-production. Season 2 only.	Traditional
Daniel Spellbound	20	2022–present	Netflix	Boat Rocker Studios	American co-production	CGI
Daniel Tiger's Neighborhood	131	2012–present	Treehouse TV	9 Story Media Group	American co-production	Flash
Dark Oracle	26	2004–2006	YTV	Cookie Jar Entertainment		Live-action/Traditional
The Dating Guy	26	2008–2009	Teletoon at Night	Entertainment One		Traditional
The Day My Butt Went Psycho!	40	2013–2015	Teletoon	Nelvana	Australian co-production	Flash
Dee & Friends in Oz	16	2024–present	Netflix	9 Story Media Group	American co-production	CGI
The Deep	65	2015–present	Teletoon	WildBrain Studios	Australian co-production	CGI
The Deerskins	26	2013	APTN	JerryCo Communications		Traditional
Delilah & Julius	52	2005–2008	Teletoon	Decode Entertainment		Flash
Delta State	26	2004–2006	Teletoon at Night	Nelvana	French co-production	Traditional
Denis and Me	35	2020–present	WildBrainTV	Headspinner Productions		Flash
Dennis the Menace	78	1986–1988	Syndication	DIC Entertainment	American-French co-production	Traditional
Descendants: Wicked World	33	2015–2017	Disney Channel	Bad Angels Productions	American co-production	CGI
Detentionaire	53	2011–2015	Teletoon	Nelvana		Flash
Dex Hamilton: Alien Entomologist	26	2008	CBC Kids	March Entertainment	Australian co-production	Flash
Di-Gata Defenders	52	2006–2008	Teletoon	Nelvana	French co-production	Traditional
Dino Babies	52	1994–1996	YTV	Fred Wolf Films	American-British-Irish co-production	Traditional
Dino Ranch	52	2021–present	CBC Kids	Boat Rocker Studios		CGI
Dinopaws	51	2014–2015	Treehouse TV	Guru Studio	British co-production	CGI
Dinosaur Train	100	2009–2020	TVOKids	The Jim Henson Company	American-Singaporean co-production	CGI
Dinosaucers	65	1987	Syndication	DIC Entertainment	American co-production	Traditional
Dirtgirlworld	52	2009–2011	CBC Kids	Decode Entertainment	Australian co-production	CGI
The Dog & Pony Show	23	2020–present	Treehouse TV	Nelvana	American co-production	Flash
Dog City	31	1992–1994	YTV	Nelvana	American co-production	Traditional
Doggy Day School	52	2009–2011	TVOKids	Cité-Amérique	Brazilian co-production	Flash
Dogs in Space	40	2021–present	Netflix	Atomic Cartoons	American co-production	Traditional
Doki	76	2013–2019	TVOKids	Portfolio Entertainment	Latin American co-production	Flash
Donkey Kong Country	40	1997–2000	Teletoon	Nelvana	American-French co-production	CGI
Doodlez	40	2002–2004	Teletoon	Cellar Door Productions	Interstitial program	Flash
Doomlands	10	2022–present	The Roku Channel	Look Mom! Productions	American co-production	Flash
Doomsday Brothers	18	2020–2021	Télétoon la nuit; Adult Swim	Portfolio Entertainment		Flash
The Doozers	72	2013–2014	CBC Kids	DHX Media	American co-production	CGI
Dora	52	2024–present	Paramount+	Pipeline Studios	American co-production	CGI
Dorg Van Dango	26	2020–2021	Family Channel	WildBrain Studios	Irish co-production	Traditional
Dot.	78	2016–2018	CBC Kids	Industrial Brothers	American co-production	Flash
Dr. Dimensionpants	26	2014–2015	Teletoon	DHX Media		Flash
Dragon	78	2004–2007	Treehouse TV	Cité-Amérique	American-German-South Korean co-production	Stop-motion
Dragon Booster	52	2004–2006	CBC Kids	Nerd Corps Entertainment	French co-production	CGI
Dragon Hunters	52	2006–2012	Teletoon	Tooncan	French co-production	Traditional
The Dragon Prince	45	2018–present	Netflix	Bardel Entertainment	American co-production	CGI
Dragon Tales	94	1999–2005	CBC Television (CBS Playground (Season 1)/Get Set for Life (Season 2)/Kids' CBC (Season 3))		American co-production	Traditional (Cel (Season 1)/Digital ink-and-paint (Seasons 2-3))
Dumb Bunnies	26	1998–1999	YTV	Nelvana	Australian co-production	Traditional

=== E ===
Title	Episodes	Year	Original channel	Canadian company	Note	Technique
Eckhart	39	2000–2002	Teletoon	Phoenix Animation Studios	Chinese co-production	Traditional
Ed, Edd n Eddy	69	1999–2009	Cartoon Network	A.k.a. Cartoon; Funbag Animation Studios	American co-production	Traditional
Edgar & Ellen	26	2007–2008	YTV	Studio B Productions; Bardel Entertainment	American co-production	Flash
Edward	65	2002–2003	Teletoon	CinéGroupe		Flash
Eek! The Cat	75	1992–1997	YTV	Nelvana	American co-production	Traditional
The Eggs	52	2004–2005	Nine Network	Funbag Animation Studios	Australian co-production	Flash
Elinor Wonders Why	40	2020–2022	TVOKids	Pipeline Studios; Shoe Ink	American co-production	Flash
Ella the Elephant	26	2013–2014	TVOKids	DHX Media		CGI
Elliot Moose	26	2000–2001	TVOKids	Nelvana		Traditional
Endangered Species	26	2015	Teletoon	Nerd Corps Entertainment		CGI
Erky Perky	78	2006–2009	YTV	CCI Entertainment	Australian co-production	CGI
Esme & Roy	52	2018–2021	Treehouse TV	Nelvana	American co-production	Flash
Et Dieu créa... Laflaque		2004–2019	Ici Radio-Canada Télé			CGI
Eureka!	30	1980–1981	TVOntario	Grafilm Productions Inc.		Traditional
Ever After High	68	2013–2016	YouTube; Netflix	Guru Studio	American co-production	Flash
Ewoks	26	1985–1986	ABC	Nelvana	American co-production	Traditional

=== F ===
Title	Episodes	Year	Original channel	Canadian company	Note	Technique
Faireez	52	2005		Funbag Animation Studios	Australian co-production	Flash
Family Dog	10	1993	CBS	Nelvana	American co-production. First adult animated television series.	Traditional
Fangbone!	26	2016–2017	Family Chrgd	Radical Sheep Productions		Flash
Fantastic Four: World's Greatest Heroes	26	2006–2010	YTV	Marvel Entertainment	American-French co-production	Traditional
Farzzle's World	160	2004–2007	Treehouse TV			Flash
Feeling Good with JoJo	20	2006–2008	Family Jr.	Cuppa Coffee Studios	American co-production	Stop-motion
Fievel's American Tails	13	1992	CBS	Nelvana	American co-production	Traditional
Fishtronaut	104	2009–2015	Discovery Kids	Tooncan	Brazilian co-production	Flash
Flash Gordon	26	1996–1997	YTV	Lacewood Productions	American-French co-production	Traditional
Flight Squad	26	2000	Teletoon	Cookie Jar Group	French co-production	Traditional
Fly Tales	65	1999–2001	TVA, Teletoon	TVA Films	Interstitial program; French co-production	Traditional
Flying Rhino Junior High	26	1998–2000	Teletoon	Nelvana	French co-production	Traditional
For Better or For Worse	16	2000–2001	Teletoon	Funbag Animation Studios		Traditional
Franklin	78	1997–2004	Family Channel (Seasons 1-5); Treehouse TV (Season 6)	Nelvana	French co-production Luxembourgish co-production	Traditional
Franklin and Friends	52	2011–2012	Treehouse TV	Nelvana		CGI
Franny's Feet	52	2003–2011	Family Channel	Decode Entertainment		Flash
Freaktown	26	2016	Teletoon	Portfolio Entertainment		Flash
Freaky Stories	35	1997–2000	YTV	Decode Entertainment; Funbag Animation Studios		Traditional
Fred the Caveman	13	2002	Teletoon		French co-production	Traditional
Fred's Head	13	2007–2008	Teletoon	Spectra Animation	French co-production	Flash
Free Willy	21	1994–1995	ABC	Nelvana	American co-production	Traditional
Fresh Beat Band of Spies	20	2015–2016	Treehouse TV	Nelvana	American co-production	Flash
Friends and Heroes	39	2007–2009	Smile of a Child TV			Traditional
Fugget About It	46	2012–2016	Teletoon at Night	9 Story Media Group		Flash
Funpak	13	2005	YTV	Nelvana		Flash/CGI/Stop-motion/Traditional
The Future Is Wild	26	2007–2008	Teletoon	Nelvana	American-Singaporian co-production	CGI
Futz!	26	2007–2008	Teletoon	9 Story Media Group		Flash

=== G ===
Title	Episodes	Year	Original channel	Canadian company	Note	Technique
G2G	26	2008	Nine Network	March Entertainment	Australian co-production	Flash
Gargoyles: The Goliath Chronicles	13	1996–1997	ABC	Nelvana	American co-production. Season 3 only.	Traditional
Gary and His Demons	26	2018–present	CBC Gem	Blue Ant Studios	American co-production	Flash
George and Martha	26	1999–2000	YTV	Nelvana	American co-production	Traditional
George of the Jungle	52	2007–2017	Teletoon	Studio B Productions	American co-production	Flash
George Shrinks	40	2000–2003	CBC Kids; TVOKids	Nelvana	Chinese co-production	Traditional
Gerald McBoing-Boing	26	2005–2007	Teletoon	Cookie Jar Entertainment	American co-production	Flash; Toon Boom Harmony; Cutout; Puppet
Get Ed	26	2005–2006	Toon Disney	Red Rover Studios	American co-production	CGI
Gigantosaurus	78	2019–present	Disney Junior	Blue Sky Productions	French co-production	CGI
Glenn Martin, DDS	40	2009–2011	CityTV	Cuppa Coffee Studios	American co-production	Stop-motion
Go Away, Unicorn!	26	2018–2019	YTV	Nelvana	American co-production	Flash
Go, Dog. Go!	26	2021–present	Netflix	WildBrain Studios	American co-production	CGI
Gofrette	26	2008–2009	CBC Kids	Zoe Mae Productions	French co-production	Flash
Grojband	26	2013–2015	Teletoon	Fresh TV		Flash
Grossology	52	2006–2009	YTV	Nelvana		Flash
Growing Up Creepie	26	2006–2008	YTV	Mike Young Productions	American co-production	Flash
Guardians Evolution	17	2014–2018	APTN			Stop-motion
Guess How Much I Love You	78	2011–2017	TVOKids	9 Story Media Group	Australian co-production	Flash
Guess with Jess	52	2008–2010	Treehouse TV	Nelvana	British co-production	CGI
Gruesomestein's Monsters	6	2005	YTV	Nelvana	Shown on Funpak	Flash

=== H ===
Title	Episodes	Year	Original channel	Canadian company	Note	Technique
Hammerman	13	1991–1992	ABC	DIC Entertainment	American-Italian co-production	Traditional
Handy Manny	113	2006–2013	Disney Channel	Nelvana	American co-production	CGI
Happy House of Frightenstein	26	2021	Family Jr.	Headspinner Productions		Traditional
Happy Tree Friends	13	2006	G4	Fatkat	American co-production	Flash
Harold Rosenbaum: Chartered Accountant Extreme	5	2005	YTV	Nelvana	Shown on Funpak	Flash/Traditional
Harry and His Bucket Full of Dinosaurs	104	2005–2008	Teletoon (season 1); Treehouse TV (season 2)	CCI Entertainment	British co-production	Traditional
He-Man and the Masters of the Universe	39	2002–2004	YTV	Mike Young Productions	American co-production	Traditional
Hello Kitty's Furry Tale Theater	13	1987	CBS	DIC Entertainment	American-Japanese co-productionCGI	Traditional
Henry's World	26	2001–2004	Family Channel	Cuppa Coffee Studios		Stop-motion
Hero Elementary	40	2020–2022	TVOKids	Portfolio Entertainment	American co-production	Flash
Hilda	39	2018–2023	Netflix	Mercury Filmworks	American-British co-production	Traditional
The Hollow	10	2018–2020	Netflix	Slap Happy Cartoons		Flash
Hot Wheels Battle Force 5	52	2009–2011	Teletoon	Nerd Corps Entertainment; Nelvana	American co-production	CGI
Hotel Transylvania: The Series	26	2017–2020	Teletoon	Nelvana	American co-production	Flash
Hoze Houndz	78	1999–2006	Family Channel	Amberwood Entertainment		Traditional

=== I ===
Title	Episodes	Year	Original channel	Canadian company	Note	Technique
If You Give a Mouse a Cookie	50	2017–2021	Knowledge Network	Mercury Filmworks	American co-production	Traditional
Iggy Arbuckle	26	2007	Teletoon	C.O.R.E.	American co-production	Flash
Inspector Gadget (1983)	86	1983–1986	France 3	Nelvana		Traditional
Inspector Gadget (2015)	52	2015–2018	Teletoon (seasons 1-2); Family Channel (seasons 3-4)	DHX Media	French co-production	CGI
Interrupting Chicken	9	2022–present	Apple TV+	Mercury Filmworks	American co-production	Traditional
Invincible	9	2021–present	Amazon Prime Video	Amazon Studios	American co-production	Traditional
Iron Man: Armored Adventures	52	2009–2012	Teletoon	Marvel Animation	American-French co-production	CGI

=== J ===
Title	Episodes	Year	Original channel	Canadian company	Note	Technique
Jack	78	2011–2014	TVOKids	PVP Media (Groupe PVP)		CGI
Jacob Two-Two	62	2003–2006	YTV	Nelvana; 9 Story Media Group		Flash
Jane and the Dragon	26	2005–2006	YTV	Nelvana	New Zealand co-production	CGI
Jayce and the Wheeled Warriors	65	1985	Syndication	DIC Entertainment	French co-production	Traditional
Jeremy and Jazzy	30	2022–present	CBC Kids			Traditional
Jerry and the Raiders	26	2016–2017	TVOKids	First Star Studios		CGI
Jibber Jabber	26	2007	YTV	Northwest Imaging and FX		CGI
Jimmy Two-Shoes	52	2009–2012	Teletoon	Breakthrough Entertainment		Flash
John Callahan's Quads!	26	2001–2002	Teletoon at Night	Nelvana	Australian co-production	Flash
Johnny Test	117	2005–2014	Teletoon (Seasons 2-6)	Cookie Jar Entertainment (seasons 2-6)/DHX Media (season 6)	American co-production (Seasons 1-2)	Traditional (Digital ink-and-paint) (Season 1); Flash (Adobe Flash) (Seasons 2-6)
Johnny Test (2021)	40	2021–2022	Netflix	WildBrain Studios		Flash; Toon Boom Harmony; Cutout; Puppet
JoJo's Circus	63	2003–2007	Family Jr.	Cuppa Coffee Studios	American co-production	Stop-motion
Journey to the West: Legends of the Monkey King	26	2001	Teletoon	Cinar	Chinese co-production	Traditional
Julius Jr.	52	2013–2015	Family Jr.	BrainPower Studio	American co-production	Flash
Justin Time	76	2011–2016	Family Jr.	Guru Studio		CGI

=== K ===
Title	Episodes	Year	Original channel	Canadian company	Note	Technique
Kagagi	13	2014	APTN	Arcana Studio		CGI
Kaput & Zösky	26	2002–2003	Teletoon	Futurikon; Tooncan	French co-production	Traditional
Karma's World	40	2021–2022	Netflix	9 Story Media Group	American co-production	CGI
Kate & Mim-Mim	49	2014–2018	Knowledge Kids	Nerd Corps Entertainment; DHX Studios		CGI
Katie and Orbie	78	1994–2002	Family Channel	Lacewood Productions; Amberwood Entertainment		Traditional (Cel (Seasons 1-2)/Digital ink-and-paint (Seasons 3-5)); Flash (Macromedia Flash) (Season 6)
Kevin Spencer	112	1998–2005	The Comedy Network	Atomic Productions		
Kid Paddle	26	2002–2003	Teletoon	Spectra Animation; Dupuis	Belgian-French co-production	
Kid vs Kat	52	2008–2011	YTV	Studio B Productions		Flash
The Kids from Room 402	52	2000–2001	Teletoon	CinéGroupe	American co-production	Traditional
King	52	2003–2005	Family Channel	Decode Entertainment; Funbag Animation Studios		Traditional
King Arthur and the Knights of Justice	26	1992–1993	Syndication	Bohbot Entertainment	American-French co-production	Traditional
Kingdom Force	26	2019–2020	CBC Kids	Jam Filled Entertainment		CGI
Kiri and Lou	82	2019–2022	CBC Kids	Yowza! Animation	New Zealand co-production	Stop-motion
Knuckleheads	20	2012	Télétoon la nuit	Salambo Productions		Flash
Kody Kapow	26	2017–2018	Family Jr.	Jam Filled Entertainment	French co-production	CGI
Kong: King of the Apes	23	2016–2018	Netflix	Sprite Animation Studios	American-Japanese co-production	CGI
Kung Fu Dino Posse	40	2010–2011	YTV	Cookie Jar Entertainment	German-Singaporean-South Korean co-production	Traditional
Kuu Kuu Harajuku	78	2015–2019	Family Channel	DHX Media	American-Australian-Malaysian co-production	Flash

=== L ===
Title	Episodes	Year	Original channel	Canadian company	Note	Technique
The Last Kids on Earth	21	2019–2021	Netflix	Atomic Cartoons	American co-production	Flash
League of Super Evil	52	2009–2012	YTV	Nerd Corps Entertainment		CGI
Legend of the Three Caballeros	13	2018	Disney Channel	Atomic Cartoons; Mercury Filmworks	American co-production	Flash
The Legend of White Fang	26	1994	Family Channel	FilmFair	French co-production	Traditional
Legends of Chima	41	2013–2014	Teletoon	The Lego Group	Danish co-production	CGI
Lego Jurassic World: Legend of Isla Nublar	13	2019	Family Channel	Atomic Cartoons	American co-production	CGI
Let's Go Luna!	64	2018–2022	TVOKids	9 Story Media Group	American co-production	Flash
Life's a Zoo	20	2008–2009	Teletoon at Night	Cuppa Coffee Studios		Stop-motion
Lil Glooscap and the Legends of Turtle Island	13	2022	APTN	Moxy Fox Studio		Traditional
Little Bear	65	1995–2003	CBC Kids	Nelvana	American co-production	Traditional
Little Charmers	57	2015–2017	Treehouse TV	Atomic Cartoons; Nelvana; Spin Master Entertainment		CGI
The Little Flying Bears	39	1990–1991	Family Channel	CinéGroupe	Croatian co-production	Traditional
The Little Lulu Show	52	1995–1999	CTV; Family Channel	CINAR	American co-production German co-production (Season 3)	Traditional
Little People	52	2016–2018	Family Jr.	DHX Media	American-British co-production	CGI
Little Rosey	18	1990–1991	ABC	Nelvana	American co-production	Traditional
Littlest Pet Shop (2012)	104	2012–2016	YTV	DHX Studios Vancouver	American co-production	Flash
Looped	26	2016	Teletoon	DHX Media		Flash
Love Monster	80	2020–2022	CBC Kids	Boat Rocker Studios	British co-production	Flash
Lucas the Spider	77	2021–2022	Family Channel	Fresh TV		CGI
Luna Petunia	33	2016–2018	Netflix	BrainPower Studio	American co-production	CGI
Lunar Jim	46	2006–2007	CBC Kids	Halifax Film		Stop-motion

=== M ===
Title	Episodes	Year	Original channel	Canadian company	Note	Technique
Madeline	59	1993–2001	Family Channel	CINAR Films (Specials 2-6)	American-French co-production	Traditional
Maggie and the Ferocious Beast	39	2000–2002	Teletoon	Nelvana	American co-production	Traditional
Magi-Nation	52	2007–2010	CBC Kids	Cookie Jar Entertainment	South Korean co-production	Traditional
The Magic School Bus	52	1994–1997	TVOKids	Nelvana	American co-production	Traditional
The Magic School Bus Rides Again	30	2017–2021	Netflix	9 Story Media Group	American co-production	Flash
The Magical Adventures of Quasimodo	26	1996	Family Channel	CinéGroupe	French co-production	Traditional
The Manly Bee	5	2005	YTV	Nelvana	Shown on Funpak	Flash/Traditional
Maple Shorts	26	2005–2006	CBC Television	March Entertainment		Flash
Martha Speaks	96	2008–2014	TVOKids	Studio B Productions (seasons 1-3)/DHX Media (season 4); Oasis Animation (seasons 5-6)	American co-production	Flash
Martin Mystery	66	2003–2006	YTV	Image Entertainment Corporation	French co-production	Traditional
Martini & Meatballs	5	2005	YTV	Nelvana	Shown on Funpak	Flash; Cutout
Marvin the Tap-Dancing Horse	26	1999–2003	Teletoon	Nelvana	Chinese co-production American co-production	Traditional
Mary and Flo On the Go!	9	2022	YouTube	Shaftesbury Films		Flash
Massive Monster Mayhem	22	2017–2018	Family Channel	DHX Media		CGI/Live-action
Matt Hatter Chronicles	52	2011–2015	Teletoon	Arc Productions	British-Indian co-production	CGI
Max & Ruby	130	2002–2013, 2016-2020	Treehouse TV	Nelvana; 9 Story Entertainment (Seasons 3-5); Atomic Cartoons (Seasons 6-7)	British co-production (Seasons 4-5); American co-production (Seasons 4-5); Australian co-production (Seasons 4-5)	Flash
Max Steel (2000)	35	2000–2002	Kids' WB	Mainframe Entertainment	American co-production	CGI
Max Steel (2013)	52	2013–2014	Teletoon	Nerd Corps Entertainment	American co-production. Season 2 aired on Netflix.	CGI
Max, the 2000-Year-Old Mouse	104	1967–1992	CBC	Krantz Films		Traditional
Mecha Builders	26	2022–present	Treehouse TV	Guru Studio	American co-production	CGI
Mega Babies	26	1999–2000	Teletoon	CinéGroupe	American co-production	Traditional
Mega Man	27	1994–1996	Syndication	Ruby-Spears Productions	American co-production	Traditional
Mega Man: Fully Charged	52	2018–2019	Family Chrgd	DHX Media	American co-production	CGI
MetaJets	40	2010–2011	Teletoon	Cookie Jar	Japanese co-production	Traditional
Mia and Me	26	2012		March Entertainment	German-Italian co-production. Season 1 only.	CGI/Live-action
Mighty Express	44	2020–2022	Netflix	Spin Master Entertainment		CGI
The Mighty Hercules	128	1963–1966	Syndication	American co-production	Traditional	
Mighty Mike	78	2019–2020	Family Channel	Digital Dimension	French co-production	CGI
Mike the Knight	75	2011–2014	Treehouse TV	Nelvana	British co-production	CGI
Miracle Koala	5	2005	YTV	Nelvana	Shown on Funpak	Flash
Mischief City	26	2005	YTV	Mercury Filmworks		Flash
Miss BG	52	2005–2008	TVOKids	Breakthrough Entertainment	French co-production	CGI
A Miss Mallard Mystery	26	2000–2001	Teletoon	CINAR Corporation	Chinese co-production	Traditional
Miss Spider's Sunny Patch Friends	44	2004–2009	Teletoon	Nelvana	British co-production	CGI
Mixed Nutz	13	2008	Syndication	Big Bad Boo		Flash
Mole Sisters		2003	Treehouse TV	Funbag Animation Studios	British co-production	Traditional
Molly of Denali	65	2019–present	CBC Kids	Atomic Cartoons	American co-production	Flash
Mona the Vampire	65	1999–2006	YTV	CINAR Corporation (Seasons 1-4)/Cookie Jar Entertainment (Season 4)	French co-production British co-production Chinese co-production (Season 3); Hong Kong co-production (Season 3)	Traditional
Monster Buster Club	52	2008–2009	YTV	Image Entertainment Corporation	French co-production	CGI
Monster by Mistake	52	1996–2003	YTV	CCI Entertainment		CGI
Monster Force	13	1994	Syndication	Lacewood Productions	American co-production	Traditional
Mother Up!	13	2013–2014	Citytv	Breakthrough Entertainment	American co-production	Flash
Moville Mysteries	26	2002–2003	YTV	Nelvana		Traditional
The Mr. Men Show	39	1997–1999	Syndication	Breakthrough Entertainment	American co-production	Traditional
Mr. Piper	39	1963–1964	CBC Television			Live-action/Traditional
Mudpit	26	2012–2013	Teletoon	Cookie Jar Entertainment		CGI
Mumble Bumble	199	1999–2008	CBC Kids	Cinar	Danish co-production	Traditional
Mummies Alive!	42	1997	YTV	DIC Entertainment	American co-production	Traditional
My Big Big Friend	52	2009–2014	Treehouse TV	Breakthrough Entertainment	Brazilian co-production	Flash
My Dad the Rock Star	26	2003–2004	Teletoon	Nelvana	French co-production	Traditional
My Friend Rabbit	26	2007–2008	Treehouse TV	Nelvana		Flash
My Goldfish Is Evil!	26	2006–2007	CBC Kids	CBC Television		Traditional
My Life Me	26	2010–2011	Teletoon	Carpediem Film and Television, OD Media	French co-production	Flash
My Little Pony: Equestria Girls	70	2017–2020	YouTube	DHX Studios	American co-production	Flash
My Little Pony: Friendship Is Magic	222	2010–2019	Treehouse TV	Studio B Productions (Seasons 1-2)/DHX Media/Vancouver (Season 2-9)	American co-production	Flash
My Little Pony: Make Your Mark	17	2022–present	Netflix	Atomic Cartoons	American co-production	CGI
My Pet Monster	14	1987	Global	Nelvana	American co-production	Traditional
The Mysteries of Alfred Hedgehog	26	2010	TVOKids	Muse Entertainment	French co-production	Traditional
Mysticons	40	2017–2018	YTV	Corus Entertainment; Nelvana	American co-production	Flash
Mythic Warriors	26	1998–1999		Nelvana	French-Chinese co-production	Traditional

=== N ===
Title	Episodes	Year	Original channel	Canadian company	Note	Technique
Nanook's Great Hunt	26	1996	Teletoon	Elma Animation	French co-production	Traditional
NASCAR Racers	26	1999–2001	Fox Kids	Saban Entertainment	American co-production	Traditional
Nature Cat	98	2015–2025	Family Jr.	9 Story Media Group	American co-production	Flash
The Naughty Naughty Pets	26	2006	CBC Kids	C.O.R.E.; Decode Entertainment		Flash
Ned's Newt	39	1997–2000	Teletoon	Nelvana; Studio B Productions (season 2)	German co-production	Traditional
Nerds and Monsters	40	2014–2016	YTV	Slap Happy Cartoons		Flash
The Neverending Story	26	1995–1996	Family Channel	Nelvana	French-German co-production	Traditional
The New Adventures of He-Man	65	1990	Syndication	Mattel Television	American co-production	Traditional
The New Adventures of Lucky Luke	52	2001–2003	—N/a	Tooncan	French co-production	Traditional
The New Adventures of Nanoboy	26	2008–2013	—N/a	Cookie Jar Entertainment	Chinese-Singapore co-production	Flash
The New Adventures of Pinocchio	130	1960–1961	—N/a	Rankin/Bass Productions	American-Japanese co-production. First children's animated series.	Stop-motion
Nexo Knights	40	2015–2017	Teletoon	The Lego Group	Danish co-production	CGI
Night Hood	26	1996–1997	YTV	Cinar	French co-production	Traditional
Night Sweats	26	2015–2016	Teletoon at Night	Blue Ant Studios		Traditional
Nilus the Sandman	26	1996–1998	Family Channel	Cambium Film & Video Productions		Traditional
Nina's World	52	2016–2018	Sprout / Universal Kids	Pipeline Studios	American co-production	Flash
Ninjago	210	2011–2022	Teletoon	The Lego Group	Danish co-production. Seasons 14 and 15 aired on Netflix.	CGI
Ninjago: Dragons Rising	60	2023–present	Netflix	WildBrain Studios	Danish co-production.	CGI
Noddy	65	1998–1999	TVOKids	Catalyst Entertainment Inc.		Stop-Motion/Live-Action
Noonbory and the Super Seven	26	2009	Knowledge Network	Cookie Jar Entertainment	South Korean co-production	CGI
Norman Picklestripes	23	2019–2021	Universal Kids	Factory	American-British co-production	Stop-motion
The Not-So-Superheroic Adventures of Sidekick	5	2005	YTV	Nelvana	Shown on Funpak	Flash
Numb Chucks	52	2014–2016	YTV	9 Story Media Group; Jam Filled Entertainment		Flash

=== O ===
Title	Episodes	Year	Original channel	Canadian company	Note	Technique
O Canada		1996–2002	Cartoon Network	National Film Board of Canada		Traditional
Octonauts: Above & Beyond	26	2021–2022	Netflix	Mainframe Studios	British co-production	CGI
Odd Job Jack	52	2003–2007	The Comedy Network	Smiley Guy Studios		Flash
Oggy and the Cockroaches	26	2000–2003	France 3	Les Productions Coquerelles	French co-production	Traditional
Oh No! It's an Alien Invasion	50	2013–2015	YTV (season 1); Teletoon (season 2)	Nelvana		CGI
Ollie! The Boy Who Became What He Ate	26	2017–2019	CBC Kids	Radical Sheep Productions		Flash
The Ollie & Moon Show	52	2017–present	TVOKids	TTK Montréal	American-French co-production	Flash
Ollie's Pack	27	2020–2021	YTV	Nelvana		Traditional
Ovide and the Gang	65	1987–1989	Télévision de Radio Canada	CinéGroupe	Belgian co-production	Traditional
OWL/TV		1985–1994	CBC Television; CTV			Traditional

=== P ===
Title	Episodes	Year	Original channel	Canadian company	Note	Technique
Pac-Man and the Ghostly Adventures	52	2013–2015	Family Chrgd	41 Entertainment; Sprite Animation Studios	American-Japanese co-production	CGI
Packages from Planet X	26	2013–2014	Teletoon	DHX Studios Vancouver	American co-production	Flash
Papa Beaver's Storytime	156	1993–1999	Canal J	Cinar	French co-production	Traditional
Papyrus	52	1998	Radio-Canada		Belgian-French co-production	Traditional
Patrol 03	26	1997–1998	Teletoon	Cinar	French co-production	Traditional
Paw Patrol	267	2013–present	TVOKids	Guru Studio; Spin Master Entertainment		CGI
Pearlie	26	2009–2011	YTV	Nelvana	Australian co-production	Flash
Pecola	26	2001–2002	Teletoon	Nelvana	Japanese co-production	CGI
Peep and the Big Wide World	60	2004–2007, 2010-2011	TVOKids	9 Story Entertainment	American co-production Danish co-production	Flash
Peg + Cat	63	2013–2018	Treehouse TV	9 Story Media Group	American co-production	Flash
Pelswick	26	2001–2002	CBC Kids	Nelvana	Taiwanese co-production	Traditional
Pig City	39	2002–2004	Teletoon	CinéGroupe	French co-production	Traditional
Piggsburg Pigs!	13	1990	Fox Kids	Ruby-Spears Productions	American co-production	Traditional
Pikwik Pack	26	2020–2021	Treehouse TV	Guru Studio		Flash
Pillars of Freedom	20	2010	TVOKids	Smiley Guy Studios		Flash
Pinky Dinky Doo	52	2006–2008	CBC Kids	Key Digital	American co-production	Flash
Pinecone & Pony	16	2022–2023	Apple TV+	Atomic Cartoons	American co-production	Flash
Ping and Friends	26	2018–2019	TVOKids	Kondolole Films	Brazilian co-production	Flash
Pinky Malinky	60	2019	Netflix	Jam Filled Entertainment	American co-production	Flash
Pippi Longstocking	26	1997–1998	Teletoon	Nelvana	Swedish co-production	Traditional
Pirate Express	26	2015	Teletoon	Atomic Cartoons	Australian co-production	Flash
Pirates: Adventures in Art	44	2010–2011	TVOKids	Halifax Film		CGI
Planet Sketch	39	2005–2008	Teletoon	Decode Entertainment	British co-production	CGI
Pocket Dragon Adventures	52	1998	Syndication	D'Ocon Films Productions	American-Spanish co-production	Traditional
Poko	52	2003–2006	CBC Kids	Halifax Film		Stop-motion
Police Academy	65	1988–1990	Syndication	Ruby-Spears Enterprises	American co-production	Traditional
Polly Pocket	182	2018–present	Family Channel; Netflix	WildBrain Studios	American co-production	Flash
Poppets Town	52	2009–2011	TVOKids	Decode Entertainment	Spanish-Japanese co-production	Flash
Postcards from Buster	55	2004–2012	PBS Kids Go!	Cookie Jar Entertainment	American co-production Indian co-production (Seasons 2-4); Chinese co-production (Seasons 3-4); Hong Kong co-production (Seasons 3-4)	Traditional
Potatoes and Dragons	26	2004	Teletoon	Cookie Jar Entertainment	French co-production	Traditional
Pound Puppies	65	2010–2013	YTV	9 Story Entertainment (Season 1) (Episodes 1-7); DHX Media (Seasons 1-3) (Episodes 8-65)	American co-production	Flash
Powerbirds	26	2020	Family Jr.	Brown Bag Films	American co-production	Flash
Princess Power	14	2023–present	Netflix	Atomic Cartoons	American co-production	CGI
Princess Sissi	52	1997–1998	Radio-Canada	CinéGroupe	French-Italian co-production	Traditional
Problem Child	26	1993–1994	USA Network	Universal Cartoon Studios	American co-production. Season 2 only.	Traditional
Producing Parker	26	2009–2011	TVtropolis	Breakthrough Entertainment	Filipino co-production	Traditional
Psi Cops	24	2023	Adult Swim	Corus Entertainment		CGI
Pucca	39	2006–2008	Jetix	Studio B Productions	South Korean co-production	Flash
Pumper Pups	13	1999–2000	Treehouse TV	Amberwood Entertainment		Traditional
Punch!	26	2008	Teletoon at Night		South Korean co-production	Traditional

=== R ===
Title	Episodes	Year	Original channel	Canadian company	Note	Technique
The Raccoons	60	1985–1991	CBC Television	Gillis-Wiseman Productions; Evergreen Raccoons Television Productions		Traditional
Rainbow Fish	52	2000	Teletoon	Decode Entertainment	American-German co-production	Traditional
Rainbow Ruby	39	2016–2020	Family Jr.	DHX Media	Chinese-South Korean co-production	CGI
Ranger Rob	66	2016–2021	Treehouse TV	Nelvana	British co-production	CGI
Rated A for Awesome	26	2011–2012	YTV	Nerd Corps Entertainment		CGI
Ratz	52	2003–2006	Teletoon	Tooncan	French co-production	Traditional
Rayman: The Animated Series	4	1999–2000	Direct to video	Ubisoft	British-French co-production	CGI
Razzberry Jazzberry Jam	26	2008–2012	CBC Kids	Trapeze Animation		Flash
Ready Jet Go!	66	2016–2019	Knowledge Network	Wind Dancer Films; Snee-Oosh, Inc.	American co-production	CGI
Reader Rabbit	2	2004	Direct to video	Studio B Productions	American co- production	Flash
ReBoot	48	1994–2001	YTV	Mainframe Entertainment		CGI
ReBoot: The Guardian Code	20	2018	YTV	Mainframe Studios		CGI/Live-action
Redakai: Conquer the Kairu	52	2011–2013	YTV	Spin Master Entertainment	French co-production	Traditional
Red Ketchup	10	2023–present	Adult Swim	Corus Entertainment		Traditional
Redwall	39	1999–2002	Teletoon	Nelvana	French-German co-production	Traditional
The Remarkable Mr. King	13	2019	Treehouse TV	Nelvana		Flash
Remy & Boo	26	2020	Universal Kids	Boat Rocker Studios		CGI
Rescue Heroes	40	1999–2002	Teletoon	Nelvana	Chinese co-production	Traditional
Rev & Roll	26	2019	Family Jr.	DHX Media		CGI
Rick & Steve: The Happiest Gay Couple in All the World	14	2007–2009	Teletoon at Night	Cuppa Coffee Studios	American co-production	Stop-motion
Ricky Sprocket: Showbiz Boy	25	2007–2009	Teletoon	Studio B Productions		Flash
Ripley's Believe It or Not!: The Animated Series	26	1999	Family Channel	Cinar	French co-production	Traditional
The Ripping Friends	13	2001–2002	Teletoon	Cambium	American co-production	Traditional
Rob the Robot	104	2010–2017	TVOKids	Amberwood Entertainment	Singaporean co-production	CGI
Robinson Sucroe	26	1994–1995	Canal Familie	Cinar	French co-production	Traditional
RoboCop	12	1988	Syndication	Marvel Productions	American co-production	Traditional
RoboCop: Alpha Commando	40	1998–1999	Syndication	MGM Animation	American co-production	Traditional
RoboRoach	52	2002–2004	Teletoon	Portfolio Entertainment		Traditional
Rocket Robin Hood	52	1966–1969	CBC Television	Trillium Productions; Krantz Films		Traditional
Rocket Monkeys	66	2013–2016	Teletoon	Breakthrough Entertainment; Atomic Cartoons		Flash
Rolie Polie Olie	74	1998–2004	CBC Kids	Nelvana	French co-production	CGI
RollBots	26	2009	YTV	Amberwood Entertainment; Elliott Animation		CGI
Rosie's Rules	26	2022–present	TVOKids	9 Story Media Group	American co-production	Flash
Roswell Conspiracies: Aliens, Myths and Legends	26	1999–2000	YTV	BKN Entertainment	American co-production	Traditional
Rotten Ralph	55	1998–2001	CBBC	Tooncan	British co-production	Stop-motion
Rotting Hills	5	2005	YTV	Nelvana	Shown on Funpak	Flash
Rubble & Crew	18	2023–present	Treehouse TV	Jam Filled Entertainment; Spin Master Entertainment		CGI
Ruby Gloom	40	2006–2008	YTV	Nelvana		Flash
Rupert	65	1991–1997	YTV	Nelvana	French co-production	Traditional
Rusty Rivets	78	2016–2020	Treehouse TV	Jam Filled Entertainment; Spin Master Entertainment		CGI

=== S ===
Title	Episodes	Year	Original channel	Canadian company	Note	Technique
Sabrina: Secrets of a Teenage Witch	26	2013–2014	Hub Network	MoonScoop Entertainment	American-French-Indian-Irish co-production	CGI
Sagwa, the Chinese Siamese Cat	39	2001–2002	TVOKids	CinéGroupe	American co-production	Traditional
Sausage Party: Foodtopia	8	2024–present	Amazon Prime Video	Point Grey Pictures; Annapurna Television; Sony Pictures Television; Amazon MGM Studios	American co-production	CGI
The Savage Dragon	26	1995–1996	USA Network	Lacewood Productions (season 1); Studio B Productions (season 2)	American co-production	Traditional
The Save-Ums!	52	2003–2006	CBC Kids	Decode Entertainment		CGI
Saving Me	20	2022–2023	Family Channel	Sphere Animation	American co-production	Flash
Scaredy Squirrel	52	2011–2013	YTV	Nelvana		Flash
The Secret Railroad	61	1977		Les Société Radio-Canada		Traditional
The Secret World of Benjamin Bear	52	2003–2009	Family Channel	Amberwood Entertainment		Traditional
The Secret World of Santa Claus	26	1997	Teletoon	Marathon Productions; CinéGroupe; Sofica Gimages 4	French co-production	Traditional
Seven Little Monsters	54	2000–2003	Treehouse TV	Nelvana	Chinese-Filipino co-production	Traditional
Shadow Raiders	26	1998–1999	YTV	Mainframe Entertainment		CGI
Sharky & George	52	1990–1992	Canal+	CinéGroupe	French co-production	Traditional
Short Circutz	32	1994–1996	YTV			CGI
Sidekick	52	2010–2013	YTV	Nelvana		Flash
Silver Surfer	13	1998	Fox Kids	Marvel Studios	American co-production	Traditional
Silverwing	13	2003	Teletoon	Bardel Entertainment	Filipino co-production	Flash
Simon in the Land of Chalk Drawings	13	2002	Teletoon	Cinar	Chinese co-production	Traditional
Sitting Ducks	26	2001–2003	YTV	Creative Capers Entertainment	American co-production	CGI
Skatoony	39	2005–2007	Teletoon	Smiley Guy Studios	British co-production	Flash
Skyland	26	2005–2007	Teletoon	9 Story Media Group	French co-production	CGI
Slugterra	63	2012–2016	Family Chrgd	Nerd Corps Entertainment	Seasons 5-6 aired on Netflix.	CGI
The Smoggies	52	1989–1990	Global	Cinar	French co-production	Traditional
The Snoopy Show	38	2021–2023	Apple TV+	WildBrain Studios	American co-production	Traditional
Snoopy in Space	24	2019–2021	Apple TV+	WildBrain Studios	American co-production	Traditional
Snowsnaps	26	2018–2019	Télétoon; Treehouse TV	Corus Entertainment		CGI
Sons of Butcher	26	2005–2007	Teletoon	S&S Productions		Flash
Sonic Prime	16	2022–2024	Netflix	WildBrain Studios	American co-production	CGI
Spaced Out	26	2001–2005	Vrak.TV	Tooncan	French co-production	Traditional
Spider Riders	52	2006–2007	Teletoon	Cookie Jar Entertainment	Japanese co-production	Traditional
Spider-Man	52	1967–1970	Syndication	Krantz Films	American co-production	Traditional
Spider-Man: The New Animated Series	13	2003	YTV	Mainframe Entertainment	American co-production	CGI
Spliced	26	2009	Teletoon	Nelvana		Flash
Spy Kids: Mission Critical	20	2018	Netflix	Mainframe Studios	American co-production	CGI
The Stanley Dynamic	52	2015–2017	YTV	Nelvana		Flash/Live-action
Star Wars: Droids	13	1985–1986	ABC	Nelvana	American co-production	Traditional
StarBeam	35	2020–2021	Netflix	Kickstart Entertainment		CGI
Starveillance	6	2007	E!	Cuppa Coffee Studios	American co-production	Stop-motion
Station X	13	2005	Teletoon at Night	Cité-Amérique		Traditional
Stella and Sam	26	2011	Family Channel	Radical Sheep Productions		Traditional
Stickin' Around	39	1996–1999	YTV	Nelvana		Traditional
Stoked	52	2009–2013	Teletoon	Fresh TV		Flash
Storm Hawks	52	2007–2009	YTV	Nerd Corps Entertainment		CGI
Strange Planet	10	2023–present	Apple TV+	Mercury Filmworks	Canadian co-production	Flash
Street Fighter	26	1995–1997	USA Network	Graz Entertainment (season 1); InVision Entertainment (season 2)	American co-production	Traditional
Student Bodies	65	1997–2000	YTV	Sunbow Entertainment	American co-production	Traditional/Live-action
Summer Memories	20	2022–present	Family Channel	Yaniv's A&N Productions Ltd.		Flash
Super Agent Jon Le Bon! How to Save the World in 90 Seconds	130	2018–present	TFO	Happy Camper Media		Traditional
Sunny Day	60	2017–2019	Treehouse TV	Pipeline Studios	American-British co-production	Flash
Super Dinosaur	26	2018–2019	Teletoon	Atomic Cartoons; Spin Master Entertainment	American co-production	CGI
Super Mario World	13	1991	NBC	DIC Entertainment	American-Italian co-production	Traditional
Super Monsters	22	2017–2021	Netflix	ICON Creative Studio	American co-production	CGI
Super Why!	103	2007–2016	CBC Kids	Decode Entertainment	American co-production	CGI
Super Wish	17	2022–present	YTV	Nelvana		Flash
Supernatural Academy	16	2022	Peacock	ICON Creative Studio	American co-production	CGI
Supernoobs	26	2015–2019	Teletoon; Family Channel	DHX Studios Vancouver		Flash
Sushi Pack	52	2007–2009	CBS	DIC Entertainment	American co-production	Flash

=== T ===
Title	Episodes	Year	Original channel	Canadian company	Note	Technique
A Tale Dark & Grimm	10	2021	Netflix	Boat Rocker Studios	American co-production	CGI
Tales from the Cryptkeeper	39	1993–1999	YTV; Teletoon	Nelvana	American co-production	Traditional
Tales of the Wizard of Oz	110	1961	Syndication	Crawley Films	American co-production	Traditional
Team Galaxy	52	2006–2007	YTV	Image Entertainment Corporation	French co-production	CGI
Team Zenko Go	16	2022	Netflix	Mainframe Studios	American co-production	CGI
Tee and Mo	70	2018–2022	TVOKids	Radical Sheep Productions	British co-production	Flash
The Terrible Thunderlizards	36	1993–1997	YTV	Nelvana	American co-production	Traditional
Three Delivery	26	2008–2009	YTV	Fatkat	American co-production	Flash
Thomas & Friends: All Engines Go	92	2021–2025	Treehouse TV	Nelvana	American-British co-production	Flash
Time Warp Trio	26	2005–2006	TVOKids	Soup2Nuts	American co-production	Flash
Timothy Goes to School	26	2000–2002	TVOKids	Nelvana	Chinese co-production	Traditional
Toad Patrol	26	1999–2002	Teletoon	Funbag Animation Studios		Traditional
The Tofus	26	2004–2005	Teletoon	CinéGroupe	French co-production	Traditional
Toon Bops	52	2020–2022	Treehouse TV	Nelvana		Traditional
ToonMarty	20	2017	Teletoon	Sardine Productions		Flash
Toopy and Binoo	32	2005–2006	Treehouse TV	Spectra Animation		Flash
Toot & Puddle	26	2008–2009	Treehouse TV	Mercury Filmworks	American co-production	Traditional
Top Wing	60	2017–2020	Treehouse TV	9 Story Media Group		CGI
Total Drama	145	2007–2014, 2023–present	Teletoon	Fresh TV; Elliott Animation; Corus Entertainment (season 6–present)		Flash
Total Drama Presents: The Ridonculous Race	26	2015	Teletoon	Fresh TV		Flash
Total DramaRama	153	2018–2023	Teletoon	Fresh TV; Corus Entertainment	American co-production	Flash
Totally Spies!	156	2001–2014	Teletoon	Image Entertainment Corporation	French co-production	Traditional
Trailer Park Boys: The Animated Series	20	2019–2020	Netflix	Entertainment One		Traditional
Transformers: BotBots	10	2022	Netflix	Entertainment One	American-Irish co-production	Flash
Transformers: EarthSpark	18	2022–present	YTV	Entertainment One	American co-production	CGI
Transformers: Rescue Bots	104	2011–2016	Teletoon	Atomic Cartoons; DHX Media	American co-production	Flash
Treasure	13	2000–2001	YTV	Cinar	British co-production	Traditional
A Treasure in My Garden	13	2003	Teletoon		Interstitial program	Traditional
Tripping the Rift	39	2004–2007	Space	CinéGroupe	American co-production	CGI
Trucktown	40	2014–2018	Treehouse TV	Nelvana		CGI
True and the Rainbow Kingdom	26	2017–2019	Netflix	Guru Studio	American co-production	CGI
Trulli Tales	104	2017–present	Knowledge Kids	Congedo CulturArte	French-Italian co-production	Flash
Tupu	26	2005	France 3	Tooncan	French co-production	Traditional
Turbo Dogs	26	2008–2011	CBC Kids	CCI Entertainment	American-New Zealand co-production	CGI
The Twisted Whiskers Show	26	2009-2010	Teletoon		American-British-Irish-Indian co-production	CGI

=== U ===
Title	Episodes	Year	Original channel	Canadian company	Note	Technique
Ugly Americans	31	2010–2012	Comedy Central	Cuppa Coffee Studios; Big Jump Entertainment	American co-production	Flash
Ultraforce	13	1994–1995	USA Network	DIC Entertainment	American co-production	Traditional
Ultimate Book of Spells	26	2001–2002	YTV		German co-production	Traditional
Undergrads	13	2001	Teletoon	Decode Entertainment	American co-production	Traditional
The Undersea Adventures of Captain Nemo	78	1975	CBC Television	Rainbow Animation		Traditional
Unicorn Academy	9	2023–present	Netflix	Spin Master Entertainment	Canadian co-production	CGI
Untalkative Bunny	39	2001–2003	Teletoon	Marblemedia	British co-production	Traditional
The Upstairs Downstairs Bears	13	2001	Teletoon	Cinar	British co-production	Stop-motion
Urban Vermin	26	2007–2008	YTV	Decode Entertainment		CGI

=== V ===
Title	Episodes	Year	Original channel	Canadian company	Note	Technique
Viva Piñata	52	2006–2009	YTV	Bardel Entertainment	American co-production	CGI
Voltron Force	26	2011–2012	Nicktoons	World Events Productions	American co-production	Traditional
Vor-Tech: Undercover Conversion Squad	13	1996	ABC	Lacewood Productions	American-French co-production	Traditional

=== W ===
Title	Episodes	Year	Original channel	Canadian company	Note	Technique
Walter and Tandoori	104	2005–2010	TV5 Québec Canada	Image Entertainment Corporation	French co-production	Traditional
Wandering Wenda	26	2017	CBC Kids	Breakthrough Entertainment		Flash
Wapos Bay	35	2005–2011	TV5 Québec Canada	APTN		Stop-motion
Watership Down	39	1999–2001	YTV	Decode Entertainment	British co-production	Traditional
Waybuloo	150	2009–2012	Treehouse TV	DHX Media	British co-production	CGI
Waynehead	13	1996–1997	YTV	Nelvana	American co-production	Traditional
Wayside	26	2007–2008	Teletoon	Nelvana		Flash
Weird Years	26	2006–2007	YTV	Mercury Filmworks		Flash
Weird-Ohs	26	1999–2000	YTV	Decode Entertainment		CGI
Welcome to the Wayne	30	2017–2019	YTV	Yowza! Animation	American co-production	Traditional
What About Mimi?	39	2000–2002	Teletoon	Decode Entertainment; Studio B Productions		Traditional
What It's Like Being Alone	13	2006	CBC Television			Stop-motion
What's with Andy?	78	2001–2007	Teletoon	CinéGroupe	American co-production (season 1); French co-production (season 2)	Traditional
What's Your News?	42	2009	CBC Kids	TT Animation	British co-production	CGI
Where's Wally?	13	1991	CBS	DIC Entertainment	American-British co-production	Traditional
Wibbly Pig	52	2009–2010	TVOKids	9 Story Media Group	British co-production	Flash
Wilbur	26	2006–2008	CBC Kids	Mercury Filmworks	Danish co-production	Flash; Live-action
Wild C.A.T.s	13	1994–1995	CBS	Nelvana	American co-production	Traditional
Wild Kratts	174	2011–present	TVOKids	9 Story Media Group	American co-production	Flash
The Wild Wild Circus Company	5	2005	YTV	Nelvana	Shown on Funpak	CGI
Will and Dewitt	26	2007–2008	YTV	Cookie Jar Group		Flash
Willa's Wild Life	26	2008–2009	YTV	Nelvana	French co-production	Flash
Winston Steinburger and Sir Dudley Ding Dong	26	2016	Teletoon	Entertainment One	Australian co-production	Flash
Wishenpoof!	39	2014–2019	Amazon Prime Video	DHX Media	American co-production	CGI
Wishfart	26	2017–2018	Teletoon	Nelvana		Flash
Wolf Joe	46	2021	TVOKids	Amberwood Entertainment		Traditional
The Wombles	104	1996–1998	CITV	Cinar	British co-production	Traditional
The Wonderful Stories of Professor Kitzel	105	1972	Syndication	Krantz Films	American co-production	Traditional
Woofy	65	2004–2005	France 5	Tooncan	French co-production	Traditional
Work It Out Wombats!	26	2023–present	PBS Kids	Pipeline Studios	American co-production	Flash
World of Quest	26	2008–2009	Teletoon	Cookie Jar	American co-production (season 1)	Flash
The Wrong Coast	13	2003–2004	The Movie Network	Cuppa Coffee Studios	American co-production	Stop-motion
Wunschpunsch	52	2000–2002	Radio-Canada	CinéGroupe	French co-production	Traditional

=== X ===
Title	Episodes	Year	Original channel	Canadian company	Note	Technique
X-Men: The Animated Series	76	1992–1997	Fox Kids Network	Marvel Entertainment Group	American co-production	Traditional
Xavier Riddle and the Secret Museum	37	2019–2022	TVOKids	9 Story Media Group	American co-production	Flash
Xcalibur	40	2001–2002	YTV	Tooncan	French co-production	CGI

=== Y ===
Title	Episodes	Year	Original channel	Canadian company	Note	Technique	
Yakkity Yak	26	2002–2003	Teletoon	Studio B Productions	Australian co-production	Flash	
Yam Roll	39	2006	CBC Kids	March Entertainment		Flash	
Yin Yang Yo!	65	2006–2009	Jetix (Toon Disney)	Elliott Animation	American co-production	Flash	
Young Robin Hood	26	1991–1992	Syndication	Cinar	American co-production	American-French co-production	Traditional
Yvon of the Yukon	52	1999–2005	YTV	Studio B Productions			Traditional

=== Z ===
Title	Episodes	Year	Original channel	Canadian company	Note	Technique
Z-Squad	26	2006–2007	Teletoon	Nelvana	South Korean co-production	CGI
Zafari	52	2018–2019	Nat Geo Kids	Zafari Productions	American co-production	CGI
Zeke's Pad	26	2010	YTV	Bardel Entertainment	Australian co-production	CGI
Zeroman	13	2004	Teletoon	Amberwood Entertainment		Traditional
The ZhuZhus	26	2016–2017	YTV	Nelvana	American co-production	Flash
Zigby	52	2009–2013	Treehouse TV	Thunderbird Films	Australian-Singaporean co-production	CGI
The Zimmer Twins	106	2005–2008	Teletoon	Lost the Plot Productions	Interstitial program	Flash
Zixx	39	2004–2009	YTV	Mainframe Entertainment		CGI
Zoboomafoo	65	1999–2001	TVOKids	Cinar	American co-production	Live-action/Stop-motion
Zoe and Charlie	26	1993	TVOKids	CinéGroupe	French co-production	Traditional
Zokie of Planet Ruby	26	2023	Amazon Prime Video	Nelvana		Flash; Toon Boom Harmony; Cutout; Puppet

== See also ==
- Lists of Canadian television series
