= Brian Froud (actor) =

Canadian voice actor

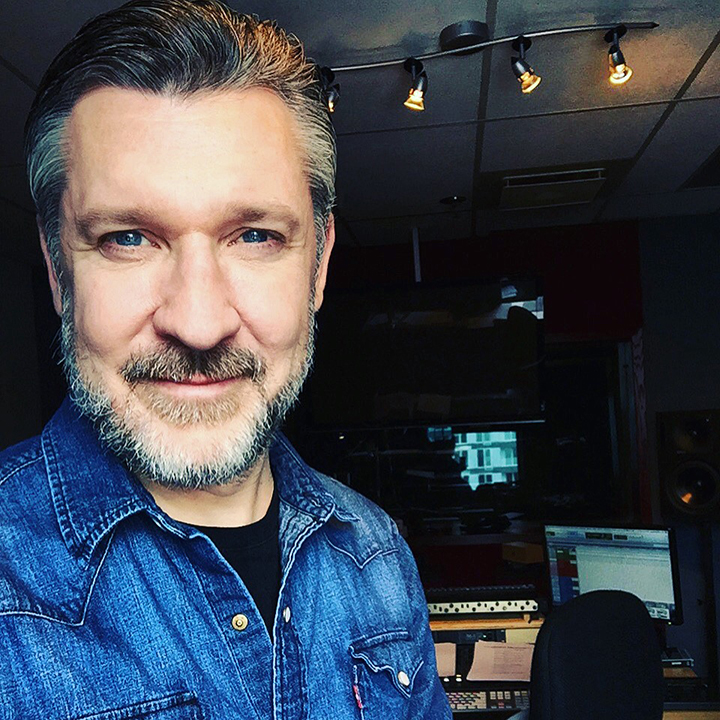
- Brian Froud
- Occupation: Voice actor/director
- Years active: 2005–present

Brian Froud is a Canadian voice actor and voice director. His credits include lead roles in Total Drama (Harold & Sam), Jimmy Two-Shoes (Beezy), Detentionaire (Lynch Webber), ToonMarty (the title character) and Zafari (Quincy & Antonio). He is the voice director of Chop Chop Ninja, an animated series based on the popular video game series. His accolades include a ACTRA Award.

== Filmography ==
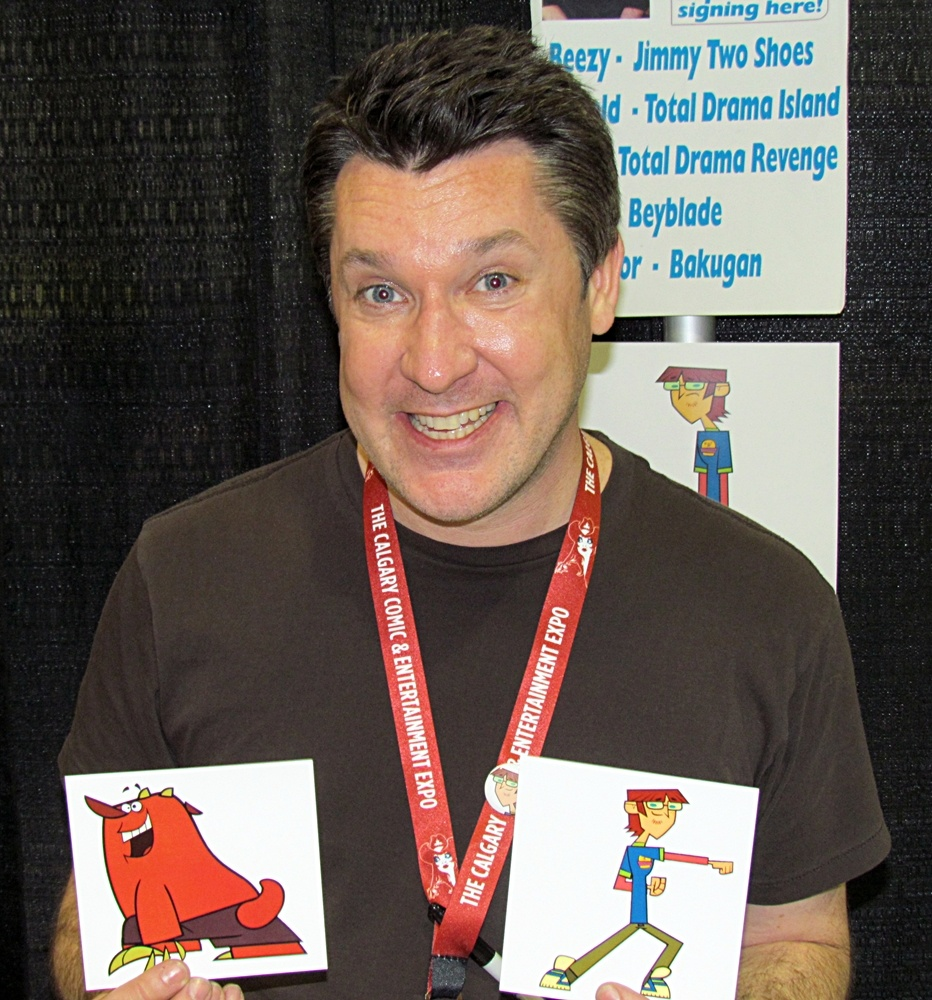
Froud in 2012

=== Anime ===
| Year | Title | Role | Notes |
|---|---|---|---|
| 2010 | Beyblade: Metal Fusion | Reiji | 5 episodes |
| 2010 | Bakugan Battle Brawlers: Gundalian Invaders | Hawktor | 2 episodes |
| 2013 | Beyraiderz Shogun | Flame / Kaiser | 7 episodes |

=== Film ===
| Year | Title | Role | Notes |
|---|---|---|---|
| 2008 | Savior | Edward Scott | Short film |
| 2010 | Molotov | Michel | Short film |
| 2010 | Helpline | Jeff | Short film |
| 2014 | Ben's at Home | Nature Doc Narrator | |
| 2016 | East End | Massimillano / Fitzpatrick / Ragno / Lieutenant / Bill Murray | |
| 2017 | Sorrows' Realm | Sorrows | Short film |
| 2019 | Spookley and the Christmas Kittens | Leon | Short film |

=== Television ===
| Year | Title | Role | Notes |
|---|---|---|---|
| 2005 | Harry and His Bucket Full of Dinosaurs | Planet Soccer | Episode: "Space Captain Harry: Part 1" |
| 2006 | Skyland | Actor | Episode: "Dawn of a New Day: Part 1" |
| 2006 | Bigfoot Presents: Meteor and the Mighty Monster Trucks | Dynamic Dan | 3 episodes |
| 2006 | 6teen | Connor | Episode: "Smarten Up" |
| 2007–2013 | Total Drama | Harold / Sam / Killer (All Stars) | 58 episodes |
| 2009 | Busytown Mysteries | Various Characters | Episode: "Sandcastle Squasher/Strange Ski Tracks Mystery" |
| 2009–2011 | Jimmy Two-Shoes | Beezy / Brian Froud / Skunk / Crazed Squirrel / Announcer | 52 episodes |
| 2010–2013 | Skatoony | Bradzilla / Sam / Harold / Beezy | 4 episodes |
| 2011 | Sidekick | The Ringmaster / The Porcupine | 2 episodes |
| 2011 | The Adventures of Chuck and Friends | Uncle Vertie | Episode: "Uncle Vertie's Stunt School/Dancing Wheels" |
| 2011–2012 | Detentionaire | Lynch | 16 episodes |
| 2012 | Monster Math Squad | Stinky Feet Monster | Episode: "The Big Stink" |
| 2013 | Camp Lakebottom | Fleabiscuit | Episode: "It's a Headless Horse, Man/Voyage to the Bottom of the Deep" |
| 2013–2014 | Grojband | Clete / Z'Orb / Jammy / Savage Fred | 4 episodes |
| 2014 | Oh No! It's an Alien Invasion | Mr. Crash | Episode: "Calling Mr. Crash" |
| 2014 | Rocket Monkeys | Prickles | Episode: "The Tattler/The Button" |
| 2015 | Fatal Vows | Charlie | Episode: "Hunting Season" |
| 2015 | Little Charmers | Picklemunchinfeet | 2 episodes |
| 2015 | Looped | Barry | Episode: "Re-Vamp (#1.19b) |
| 2016 | Super Why! | More Man | Episode: "Attack of More Man!" |
| 2016 | Rusty Rivets | Ring Master | Episode: "Rusty Dives In/Rusty's Big Top Trouble |
| 2016 | Game On | Jerome's Dad | Episode: "Art for Art's Sake" |
| 2017 | Dot. | Mania Man / Fisherman Joe | 2 episodes |
| 2017 | ToonMarty | Marty / Burnatron / Argue Man / Worm | 20 episodes |
| 2017 | MaXi | Lou / Boo | 26 episodes |
| 2018 | Zafari | Quincy / Antonio | 52 episodes |
| 2018 | Chop Chop Ninja | Magic Master / Rock Lava Guard / Dummy Boss | 7 episodes |
| 2019 | Thicker Than Water | Robert | TV movie |
| 2020 | Avocado Toast: The Series | Man at Bar | Episode: "Tacos or Tubesteak" |
| 2021 | Pikwik Pack | Baxter / Mother Eagle | Episode: "Hangin' Out / Truck Italians |
