= Quantz (disambiguation) =

Johann Joachim Quantz (1697–1773) was a German flutist and composer.

Quantz may also refer to:

- QuantZ, a 2009 puzzle video game
- Quantz Verzeichnis, a catalogue of compositions by Johann Joachim Quantz, created by Horst Augsbach
- Qwantz.com, the host of Dinosaur Comics
- 9911 Quantz, a minor planet

== See also ==
- Quantztown, Ontario
