= Supernormal =

- Genre: Comedy; Superhero
- Developed by: World Leaders Entertainment
- Directed by: Miguel Martinez-Joffre
- Countries of origin: United Kingdom; United States
- Original language: English
- No. of seasons: 3
- No. of episodes: 52

Production
- Executive producers: Anne Brogan and Connal Orton
- Producers: World Leaders Entertainment; Granada Kids

Original release
- Network: ITV (CITV)
- Release: 1 September 2007 – 27 September 2008

Supernormal is an animated children's television programme for CITV. It was developed and produced by World Leaders Entertainment in New York City, USA, and Granada Kids UK. It was animated by Fatkat Animation, a Canadian animation studio. It made its television début on 1 September 2007 on CITV, but the official premiere was on 8 September of the same year.

== Plot ==
The series follows Changerella, Brass Butt, Buzz Girl, and Eric Normal, four students who attend a school for superheroes in Crumptonville. Though not particularly competent, they are determined to become proper superheroes.

== Characters ==
- Eric Normal (voiced by Michael Sinterniklaas) is a hero with no powers who takes his role as a superhero-in-training very seriously. He is filled with enthusiasm, a keen sense of justice, and desire to combat evil. He fancies himself as a master planner, but his plans are rarely thought out. He is the leader of the Superchums
- Brass Butt (voiced by Gary Littman) is Eric Normal's best friend and constant companion. BB (as he's known to his friends) comes from a long line of Brass Butts, with his father and grandfather having held the mantle before him. He is the muscle of the group. He reveals his butt Buttley can actually talk
- Changerella (voiced by Sarah Hadland) is an optimistic and peaceful hero with shapeshifting abilities. Similar to BB, she has very low intelligence such as being forgetful or not paying any attention. The most empathetic of the group, she is caring and very protective of the rest.
- Buzz Girl (voiced by Tara Sands) is an insect-like hero with purple skin, four arms, and wings. She is able to climb walls, fly, stretch her tongue, and generate webs. Buzz Girl is often sarcastic, but means well.

== Episodes ==
=== Season 1 ===
1. Stop Clowning Around
2. Partly Cloudy With a Slight Chance of Donkey
3. Hard as Snails
4. Hold the Pickle
5. The Gouda, the Brie and the Ugly
6. The Ice Cream Man Cometh
7. Beware of Baby Brother
8. Big King Monkey Gorilla
9. A Stitch in Crime
10. Full of Hot Air
11. Curtains for Crumptonville
12. It's a Bird! It's a Plane! It's Supermannequin!
13. Very Mad Cows
14. Mr Bad Waits for No Man
15. Find Fog
16. Evil Barks and Wets the Carpet
17. It Rhymes with Coo!
18. Earth Ball, Corner Pocket
19. Dam Beavers
20. Would Like to Eat
21. Send in the Clowns
22. League of Evil Teachers
23. The Incredible Shrinking Mr Bad
24. The Pansy
25. Mr Badsketball
26. Day of the Really Large Wrecking Ball Season 2
27. Winning Isn't Everything, There's Also Losing
28. Web of Intrigue (and Ropes and Glue)
29. Butter Me Up
30. Eight Arms to Pound You
31. Mr. Bad Bad Suit
32. Flushed with Anger
33. Freeze!
34. Deck the Malls with Dolls and Shoppy
35. Powers That Be.... Gone.
36. The Music Man-iac
37. Bring Me Sunshine
38. The Very Most Simple Plan of Mr Bad yet
39. Thing with No Brain

== Critical response ==
On a poll run by CITV, only 2% of children voted it their favourite television programme on the channel, tied sixth with Pocoyo. First in the poll was Horrid Henry, followed by Bratz, My Parents Are Aliens, Jungle Run, and Emu. Tied for last place with 1% were Skyland and Jim Jam and Sunny.
