= QuantZ =

2009 video game

- Developer: Gamerizon
- Publisher: Gamerizon
- Platforms: Microsoft Windows, MacOS
- Release: September 3, 2009
- Genres: Strategy, Puzzle, Indie

QuantZ is a puzzle and strategy game released by publisher and developer Gamerizon, a small company out of Montreal, on September 3, 2009. The object of the game is to shoot differently colored marbles one at a time at a cube with other colored marbles on it. If a combination of three marbles of the same color or more is formed, those marbles will disappear, similar to Collapse!.

== Gameplay ==
QuantZ has three game modes, Strategy, Action, and Puzzle.

== Reception ==
QuantZ received mixed reviews upon release. On Metacritic, the game holds a score of 67/100 based on 4 reviews. It received an 8.2 from GameZebo, which told players-to-be to "prepare for many hours of marble-bursting fun." Testfreaks gave the game a score of 9.0 out of 10.0
