= Lists of Canadian television series =

The lists are divided by Canadian language:

- List of English-language Canadian television series
- List of French-language Canadian television series

== See also ==
- List of Canadian animated television series
