= ToonMarty =

Canadian animated television series

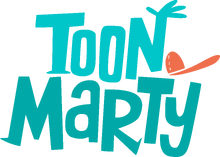
- Genre: Adventure; Comedy; Slapstick; Fantasy
- Created by: Robin Balzano; Pascale Beaulieu; Paul Stoica; Frédérick Wolfe
- Based on: An original idea by Robin Balzano; Pascale Beaulieu; Philippe Daigle; Stéphanie Larrue; Alexis Rondeau; Paul Stoica; Claudine Vézina; Frédérick Wolfe
- Developed by: Robin Balzano; Pascale Beaulieu; Sean Scott(co-developer); Paul Stoica; Frédérick Wolfe
- Directed by: Sean Scott
- Voices of: Brian Froud; Holly Gauthier-Frankel; Mike Paterson; Brett Schaenfield; Erin Agostino; Stacey DePass
- Theme music composer: Mathieu Dubus
- Composers: Mathieu Lafontaine; Leon Louder
- Country of origin: Canada
- Original languages: English; French
- No. of seasons: 1
- No. of episodes: 20 (40 segments)

Production
- Producers: Ghislain Cyr; Madeleine Lévesque; Luc Wiseman
- Running time: 22 minutes (11 minutes per segment)
- Production company: Sardine Productions

Original release
- Network: Teletoon
- Release: May 1 – May 25, 2017

ToonMarty is a Canadian animated television series produced by Sardine Productions which first premiered on Teletoon on May 1, 2017, ending on May 25 the same year.

== Plot ==
ToonMarty follows the adventures of Marty, the mascot of ToonMart who becomes alive when a billboard is hit by lightning. Together, he and his friends Burnie and Holly have fun in Toonville under the supervision of Marty's boss, Jack.

== Characters ==
=== Main ===
- Marty (voiced by Brian Froud) is the mascot of ToonMart and its only employee.
- Burnie (voiced by Mike Paterson) is Marty's best friend, son of local supervillain Burnatron.
- Holly (voiced by Holly Gauthier-Frankel) is a female blue robot.
- Jack (voiced by Brett Schaenfield) is Marty's boss.

=== Recurring ===
- Suki (voiced by Erin Agostino) is Marty's love interest. She is a blue-haired anime magical girl.
- Carly is a cat who resembles Hello Kitty.
- Burnatron (voiced by Brian Froud) is Toonville's local supervillain and Burnie's father.
- Super Simon is a superhero who saves Toonville.
- Chef and Chicken are Marty's favorite cartoon stars, the Ant & Aardvark-esque pair of a raging chef and a sassy chicken.
- Hobo Jeb is a curmudgeon vagabond dog.
- Grizelda is a witch.
- Punchy McKnuckles is Toonville's bully.
- Lenny is a bench.
- Dr. Smartypants is a monkey doctor.

== Episodes ==
No.	Title	Written by	Storyboard by	Original release date
1	"Moonlighting Marty"	Dan Williams	Alexei Kazakov	May 1, 2017
1	"Awful Waffle"	Dan Williams	Pierre-Alexandre Comtois	May 1, 2017
Marty is super extra good at being Burnatron's evil sidekick, so good in fact that he alienates his best friend Burnie. His solution to bring father and son back together again is successful but quite explosive. When Marty plugs in an old waffle iron, he unleashes Waffle Man, a smooth-talking maniac who wants to turn everything and everyone into waffles. Marty fights back with everything he has!
2	"Billboard Boy"	Heidi Foss	Louis Piché	May 2, 2017
2	"Marty's Zit"	Paul Stoica	Daniel Payette	May 2, 2017
After an open call to find the new face of the ToonMart, Burnie becomes the new ToonMart Mascot, and Marty his mentor, until Burnie gets bored and overworked and sabotages himself. Marty befriends his first pimple: From childhood, through adolescence, into parenthood, and finally into old age, Zitty proves to be a great companion and a true friend.
3	"Where There's Smoke There's Marty"	Doug Hadders & Adam Rotstein	Guy Lamoureux	May 3, 2017
3	"Chicken Fricassee"	John Hazlett	Louis Piché	May 3, 2017
Marty's overworked cartoon exit-smoke trail leaves in a huff, leaving him without energy. He borrows Burnie's smoke trail to compete for the Employee of the Month award. Will his dreams go up in smoke? Marty, out to prove all ToonMart gizmos work perfectly, helps Chef catch Chicken. When he roasts Chicken, the toons ostracize him and he learns that everyone has their place and that Saucy Chicken's not really dead.
4	"Toonsgiving Day Parade"	Kevin Shustack	Daniel Payette	May 4, 2017
4	"Rest in Pieces"	Anne-Marie Perrotta	Karine Charlebois & Guy Lamoureux	May 4, 2017
The trio fights over building a float for the Toonsgiving Day Parade, and ends up getting snagged on the moon. They must work together and embrace Marty's love of "razzle dazzle" to make it back to Toonville. Missing a fourth for their quartet, Marty makes Blub from various parts. Blub is a great singer but an extremely annoying toon who pushes everyone's limits. Blub needs a friend or the gang could be stuck with him forever.
5	"The No-Toon Bro Zone"	Penelope Laurence	Daniel Payette	May 5, 2017
5	"You're It"	Paul Stoica	Guy Lamoureux	May 5, 2017
Marty and Burnie find Holly's "chill space", a blank area devoid of toons, and turn it into their awesome "Bro Zone". When she finds out, she's furious, until they invite her to "bro out" with them and see how great it is. When Marty gets tagged "it", he thinks it's a great honor and a fun game. When he finds out that in Toonville that "it" is a life-threatening disease, he and Burnie find the Wise Tree to figure out how to get rid of it.
6	"Candy Cute"	Lisa Hunter	Zee Risek	May 8, 2017
6	"Were-Poodle"	John Hazlett	Yann Ben Alluch	May 8, 2017
Marty, who's allergic to candy, pretends he isn't so that Suki will think he's cool. But when a night out proves too much for him, Marty learns that being cool is all about being yourself. A lesson he quickly forgets. Marty hates that everyone thinks he's cute all the time so he's super proud when he discovers that he's really a fearsome werewolf! Holly and Burnie don't have the heart to tell him he's actually a super-cute were-poodle.
7	"15 Minutes to Save the World"	Penelope Laurence	Louis Piché	May 9, 2017
7	"Spare Parts"	Shane Simmons	Zee Risek	May 9, 2017
Marty notices that Toonville always resets. The trio goes nuts and leaves Toonville a wasteland. But when Jack dies and Toonville doesn't reset, Marty has to put Toonville back. Is it his only hope of bringing Jack back? Holly's parts get scattered after Marty lets Burnie be there for her cleaning. They find most of her, but Carly and her friends now worship her head, Holly loves it until they get demanding, temperamental and dangerous...
8	"The Suit Makes the Super Hero"	Anne-Marie Perrotta	Werner Marcus, Benjamin Arcand & Louis Piché	May 9, 2017
8	"Marty's Bright Idea"	Kevin Shustack	Louis Piché	May 9, 2017
Marty and Burnie agree to dry-clean Super Simon's suit in 24 hours, but they get stuck in it. The boys create chaos with their "superhero" antics. At the day's end, they still need to get out of the suit and give it back... When Marty uses up all the idea light bulbs in Toonville and everyone starts getting dim, he and Burnie travel to the Toonville Volcano to find the light bulb source, a gross and angry worm who poops them out her bum.
9	"The Barber of Toonville"	Paul Stoica	Alexei Kazakov	May 10, 2017
9	"A Choice Apple"	Gerard Lewis & Tean Schultz	Daniel Payette	May 10, 2017
When Burnie gets the worst (and only) haircut ever in the history of Toonville, Burnie’s hair clippings go on a cultural crime spree while Marty’s lost hair goes on a lonely quest to be reunited with his owner. Before the final of the Toonville trivia contest, Grizelda gives Marty a "Choice Apple" that answers all his yes/no questions. But his brain atrophies and Jack might lose the ToonMart. Will Holly and Burnie help?
10	"Toonscout Marty"	Shawn Kalb	Yann Ben Alluch	May 11, 2017
10	"Batteries Included"	Gerard Lewis & Tean Schultz	Rachel Peters, Adriana Blake & Guy Lamoureux	May 11, 2017
When Super Simon has to go and do his scout badges, Marty is thrilled to help him. But Super Simon takes all the credit and Marty gets jealous and sabotages his hero – forgetting the true meaning of Toon Scouts. A universal remote allows the trio to control everything, leading to a slew of pranks. But when the batteries run out and they get stuck on slo-mo, they realize they have to face their victims or stay stuck forever.
11	"Toon-Derworld"	Paul Stoica	Yann Ben Alluch	May 12, 2017
11	"Cavetoon Fever"	Gerard Lewis & Tean Schultz	Zee Risek	May 12, 2017
Marty and Underworld Marty swap places on Halloween. Underworld Marty goes trick-or-treating with Burnie and Holly, while the real Marty is trapped below, where the underworldly inhabitants want to make a meal of him. When Marty and Burnie accidentally kill the frozen Cavetoon who can save them from a dinosaur attack, Marty gets caught in bigger and bigger lies as Burnie, a natural for the role, has a ball impersonating the Cavetoon.
12	"ToonMart Mutt"	Heidi Foss	Guy Lamoureux	May 15, 2017
12	"Hot Tub Toon Machine"	Sean Scott	Zee Risek	May 15, 2017
When Burnie believes Marty would be a great pet owner, he switches bodies with a dog so he can live a life of luxury. But Marty is a bad pet owner and Burnie is miserable, especially since the dog isn't eager to switch back. An overworked Marty soaks in Burnie's hot tub, but his colors drain and he looks like an old-timey toon. Locked up in an old folks home, he must get his color back and escape before the trio is trapped forever.
13	"How Marty Got His Toon Back"	Kevin Shustack	Alexei Kazakov	May 16, 2017
13	"Marty's Exploding Head"	Anne-Marie Perrotta	Yann Ben Alluch	May 16, 2017
Marty is cursed by Grizelda and loses ALL his tooniness. Marty has got to break the curse, but without a sense of humor and stripped of his toon-ability to sustain physical injury (even death), this proves very painful. Marty gets so smart that his head expands. Dr. Smartypants tells Holly and Burnie that if he learns one more thing, his head will explode. While keeping all new information from him, they try to bring him back to normal.
14	"Jack: Stunt Mole"	Kevin Shustack	Daniel Payette	May 17, 2017
14	"The Dog Catchers"	Shane Simmons	Daniel Payette	May 17, 2017
Jack quits the ToonMart and gives it to Burnatron so he can fulfill his bucket list – and discovers that he's a natural daredevil. But Marty vows to get himself to get Jack back where he belongs: The ToonMart. Believing that dog catchers appeal to dogs and are public figures, Marty and Burnie apply for the job. But they BOTH get it and discover they have to catch the biggest, meanest, most monstrous dog ever... yikes!
15	"Senseless Burnie"	Paul Stoica	Yann Ben Alluch	May 18, 2017
15	"Chef & the Marty Show"	Shane Simmons	Zee Risek	May 18, 2017
When Burnie loses the use of all his senses, Marty volunteers to be his surrogate sensor via the use of painful sense-leeches. But when Burnie abuses Marty's good graces, he puts them both in head-exploding danger. When Chef gets tired of chasing Chicken, he finds an even better prey: Marty. Or so he thinks. Chicken helps Marty escape Chef's cleaver, and Marty gives Chicken some etiquette training to get her old job back.
16	"The Holly Show"	Paul Stoica	John C. Falconer	May 19, 2017
16	"Psych-o-Marty"	Anne-Marie Perrotta	Zee Risek	May 19, 2017
When Marty and Burnie take over Holly's webseries, they steal her spotlight and her robo-super fans. But the robots hijack Marty and Burnie's lives and it's up to Holly to help them lose their super-scary super-fans. When Marty takes over Dr. Smartypants' annual job of recalibrating the toons, he and Burnie make a mess of things. Marty races against the clock to get their calibrations to stop Toonville from exploding into the toon-abyss.
17	"A Friend Too Close"	John Hazlett	Louis Piché	May 22, 2017
17	"To Be Continued..."	Lienne Sawatsky	Yann Ben Alluch	May 22, 2017
Burnie and Marty discover that everyone in Toonville hates when they're together. Blaming each other for their unlikableness, they end their friendship. Marty then skyrockets to success, and Burnie sinks into the gutter. Marty finds himself in the second part of a "To Be Continued" episode, with no recollection of what happened in the first part and everyone depending on him to save Toonville! To be continued...
18	"Birthday Boy"	Kevin Shustack	Guy Lamoureux	May 23, 2017
18	"Marty the Monster"	Stephen Senders	John C. Falconer	May 23, 2017
Marty is super excited about his birthday, but when he finds out it's also Carly's birthday, and that he has to work her preschool party at the ToonMart, Marty stops at nothing to reclaim his special day. Marty beats the toughest monster in Toonville and is declared a hero. But he grows tired of his hero status and he vows to reset everything. The problem is Toughy turns out to be a pacifist. Cue the staged fight.
19	"You Can't Handle the Tooth"	James Braithwaite	Guy Lamoureux	May 24, 2017
19	"The Hat Makes the Toon"	Kevin Shustack	Zee Risek	May 24, 2017
When Marty gets a gold-grill after losing his teeth, he becomes super cool and hangs out with Super Simon and his cool guy posse. But he gets bored of them and tries everything to hang with Burnie and Holly again. When Marty's hat is stolen by Hobo Jeb, everyone thinks Hobo Jeb is Marty! Holly and Marty have to get the toons to look past the superficial. And when that doesn't work, well, he has to steal his hat and identity back.
20	"Marty's Theme"	Anne-Marie Perrotta	Zee Risek	May 25, 2017
20	"Logic Police"	David Dias	Yann Ben Alluch	May 25, 2017
When Marty replaces his inner-theme band with a less-than-stellar yodeling crocodile, he puts his relationships and life in serious jeopardy. Holly’s logic board jammed and she vows to destroy all toons because they’re illogical. She turns Toonville into real things, until Marty puts on a toon display of unmatched proportions. A display so toony it saves Toonville.

== Online game ==
An online game was available on Teletoon's website called Marty's Special Delivery.

== International broadcast ==
In February 2017, GoldBee pre-sold pay TV rights to the series to Nickelodeon, except in North America, China and Japan. In August, British free-to-air rights were sold to CITV.
