= Jerry and the Raiders =

- Created by: Nancy Trites-Botkin; Mark Shekter
- Directed by: Adam O'Brien
- Voices of: Sebastien Botkin; Keira Phillips; Ryan LaPlante; Adam McNamara
- Music by: Glenn Morley; Mark Shekter
- Country of origin: Canada
- Original language: English
- No. of seasons: 1
- No. of episodes: 26

Production
- Executive producer: Marc Côté Mark Shekter
- Running time: 11 minutes
- Production companies: FAKE Digital Entertainment; First Star Studios

Original release
- Network: TVOKids (English); Ici Radio-Canada Télé (French); Qubo (United States)
- Release: September 10, 2016 – March 19, 2017

Jerry and the Raiders is a Canadian animated children’s television series created by Nancy Trites-Botkin and Mark Shekter, distributed by 9 Story Media Group, and produced by First Star Studios, with animation done by FAKE Digital Entertainment. The series made its debut on TVOKids in English, as well as Ici Radio-Canada Télé in French. It debuted in the United States on Qubo in October 2019.

The series focuses on a 7-year-old boy named Jerry, whose life spins comically out of control when his two galactic raider action figures, Bakko and Gant (known together as The Raiders), magically spring to life. The Raiders are hyper-curious about nearly everything around them, and thus treat every moment as one big adventure. This often leads to Jerry and his 4-year-old sister Nicole, into a series of household disasters, in which Jerry often cleans up after their mess in solving the everyday mysteries that The Raiders stumble upon.

The show is primarily aimed at children aged 4–8.

== Description ==
To commemorate Jerry's 7th birthday, he is given a pair of boxed action figures, known as Galactic Raiders. Jerry, utterly disappointed with his gifts, opts to not open them, and decides to stash them up onto his head board where he would later have intended to put them into the give-away box. Later that night, a dripping sound was heard from down the hallway, and the Galactic Raiders, Bakko and Gant, magically spring to life and break free from their packaging. In attempting to discover the mystery of this sound, the Raiders using their gadgets to navigate Jerry's room, frantically make enough noise to wake him up. Early on, Jerry is convinced that he is dreaming when he sees his action figures come to life, but once Nicole discovers them, he is ultimately faced with the truth that his toys are special, and that neither his parents nor his friends can find out about them.

Every episode challenges Jerry with daunting children's tasks, from school assignments to chores, as well as one's everyday life activities, from taking care of an animal to playing safely. The Raiders' minds are boggled by these activities, and immediately treat them as some sort of great mystery, or often as a ferocious villain set to take over their neighborhood. Jerry, Nicole and the Raiders pull through each challenge and discover new and interesting things than happen around them, solidifying that things are not always as they appear to be, and simple everyday things always turn out amazing.

Unlike most animated series, which often feature static cameras to portray strong lines of action through characters, Jerry and the Raiders is known for its constant camera movements. Almost every shot contains subtle camera movements, such as trucking and tilting.

== Episodes ==
- Episode 1: The Mighty Drip: The Raiders awaken and try to find the source of the dripping sound.
- Episode 2: Robovac (no hyphen in TV guides but the title card says ROBO-VAC on one line): Jerry is pressured into vacuuming his room, but the Raiders are convinced it's a giant robot.
- Episode 3: A Hole Lot of Lettuce: There are holes in Mom's lettuce in her garden. The Raiders blame Nicole, but there's a bigger mystery at hand.
- Episode 4: Night Spies: Flickering lights are spread across the backyard. The Raiders believe there's an incoming invasion.
- Episode 5: Garbage Thief: Jerry forgets to put the lid onto the trash can, and a thief who loves to dig up garbage is among them.
- Episode 6: A Fishy Tale: Jerry catches a fish in his backyard pond. The Raiders find that this fish actually has legs, and is not actually a fish.
- Episode 7: Web Master: Nicole makes a birthday card for their Mom, but the Raiders use it to fly and destroy a large sticky web in the kitchen.
- Episode 8: Fuzzbots: Jerry's friend Wolf wants to skateboard with him, but Jerry needs his helmet. The Raiders discover it buried in tiny invaders.
- Episode 9: Hair-em Scar-em: Nicole can't find her caterpillar. The Raiders discover that it's being held up within some sort of alien pod.
- Episode 10: Pot of Gold: A pot of gold awaits Nicole and the Raiders at the end of the rainbow, if only the rainbow would stand still.
- Episode 11: Mr. Rathbone: Jerry's neighbor is looking for her cat. The Raiders fear a giant wild animal is on the loose.
- Episode 12: Red Baron: Jerry and Wolf decide to do their school project on the lunar eclipse. The Raiders are convinced it's no eclipse.
- Episode 13: Odor Ogre (no U in TV guides but the title card spells it ODOUR OGRE): Jerry's babysitter Amanda is over for the afternoon, but something stinks horribly around the house.
- Episode 14: Grandfather Clock: Jerry and Nicole are short on time to make hats for a party. The Raiders mount Mom's new grandfather clock to try to stop time.
- Episode 15: Where Is Tom Post?: Nicole goes to feed her friend Tom Post, who accidentally eats Jerry's favorite pen and comic.
- Episode 16: Bubble Trouble: Nicole is too young to chew bubble gum, and so she sets it aside. The Raiders get into a sticky situation.
- Episode 17: Riley Robot: Wolf brings over his cool new toy. The Raiders are jealous of it as it completes Jerry's chores.
- Episode 18: Wilson's Whistle: Jerry's aunt asked him to watch over her puppy. Suddenly, without noticing, Wilson has disappeared.
- Episode 19: Just Add Water: Mom has a guessing game set up for the kids. The Raiders fear what she has in store for them.
- Episode 20: Knock Knock: Jerry and The Raiders are having a sleep-out in the tree house, until they start hearing loud knocking noises.
- Episode 21: Skeeter Skare: The Raiders try to warn Jerry and Nicole of buzzing invaders in the backyard. English debut on TVO 5:41am 15 July. 2017
- Episode 22: Ants In My Pants: Nicole's tea party is ruined when mighty marchers attempt to steal her cookies. Gant goes in alone to save the day. English debut on TVO 5:41am 8 July. 2017
- Episode 23: Push and Pull: The Raiders, who while playing with Jerry's click sticks, end up binding together by magnetism. English debut on TVo 5:30am 8 July 2017.
- Episode 24: Blowrado: Jerry is raking the leaves for an allowance, but the declared villain Blowrado keeps blowing them away.
- Episode 25: Flight of The Bumblers: The Raiders catch an invader digging through a flower. Jerry investigates further to put it into his school project. Engliah debut on TVO 5:30am 15 July 2017.
- Episode 26: Giant Thorom: Loud crashing and lightning bolts in the sky cause the Raiders to shake in their boots.
