= The Secret Railroad =

Animated series

The Secret Railroad or Les Voyages du Tortillard in French, is a series produced by Societe Radio-Canada of 52 (or possibly 61) animated shorts made in Montreal, Quebec, Canada. Episodes last 5 minutes each.

It was originally recorded in English at Place D'Youville in Montreal then subsequently dubbed into French. It was produced by Peter Saunders and Danielle Marleau under the production company Films du Train Secret, and the participation of Les Société Radio-Canada and the Société de Développement de l'Industrie Cinématographique Canadienne. .

It also aired in the United States on The Great Space Coaster in the early 1980s.

== Characters ==
=== Simon ===
(Voiced by Douglas Heintzman) The main character is a young boy named Simon who discovers a magical steam locomotive hidden in the basement of his apartment building. Acting as the engineer Simon uses the locomotive to travel on many magical adventures.

=== Mr. George T. Passenger ===
(Voiced by Neil Shee) Joining Simon every episode is Mr. Passenger (Monsieur Globetrotteur in French), an old man who awaited the coming of the train for many a decade before Simon finally arrived.

=== Mélanie ===
With Mr. Passenger is Mélanie (Melanie), Mr. Passenger's cat who always rides atop his long stove pipe hat.

=== Stella ===
Each episode also features a character named Stella, a girl with star shaped hair. Stella's character changes from episode to episode (a mermaid in an underwater episode for example) but she always has her star shaped hair.

== Theme song lyrics ==
When you are feeling blue,

When you are feeling down.

Just do what Simon did;

Go underground.

Down there in the dark,

You hear a happy sound.

It's the secret railroad.

Adventure bound!

You better climb on board

the train's about to leave.

All you need is a passenger.

Your tickets, please!

== English episode names ==
- A cat's eye view
- A funny thing happened on the way to the railroad
- Animal trackers
- Back track
- Blue...genies...blues!
- Bridging the gaps
- Double Simon or quits
- Elementary my dear passenger
- Engine ills
- Fitting the parts
- Flights of fancy
- Ghost train
- Go wild west young man
- Gold rush railroad
- Hot the only way to travel
- I spy with my little train
- Invisible...man!
- Joly Roger railroad
- Mer-train
- Mr.Passenger's bag
- Near myths
- Next stop wherever
- Out of seasons
- Railroad puzzles
- Railway rhythms
- Reversible railroad
- Robin Dude
- Robot riddles?
- Rocky ride
- Safari so good
- Saturday night steam
- Scaredy cat
- Simon's secret
- Simon, Melanie, Stella, Mr.Passenger
- Slap control stick
- Smoke signals
- Spaced out Liliput
- Special railroad effects
- Stationary passenger
- Stealing the show
- Stella in space
- Stellapatra
- Super Sam
- Talking the night train
- The abominable snow child
- The great train game
- The last train in toyland
- The musical ride
- The spirit of the railroad
- The talking train
- Things that go bump in the tunnel
- Time machine train
- Tooth tracks
- Train bug
- Train in training
- Trainsylvania
- U.F.O...Oh!...Oh!
- Unwelcome on board
- Where there's smoke there's a dragon
- Which way switch
- Whistle stop tours
