= Fatkat =

Former animation studio

- Industry: Animation production
- Founded: May 1999; 27 years ago
- Founder: Gene Fowler
- Defunct: May 2009; 17 years ago
- Fate: Folded into Oasis Animation
- Headquarters: Miramichi, New Brunswick, Canada

Fatkat Animation was an animation studio located in Miramichi, New Brunswick.

== History ==
The company was formed from animators who left Helix Animation in 1999. It was owned and operated by Gene Fowler and his employees. This company was started in Halifax, Nova Scotia, and was taken over by Trainingscape, which saw the creation of over 40 training films for various companies, but as of 2009, it's now known as Oasis Animation.

In the winter of 2003, Trainingscape disbanded and that was when Fowler decided to move Fatkat to his hometown of Miramichi, New Brunswick. Fatkat worked on the film Curious George (2006), television shows such as Happy Tree Friends, Caillou (Season 3 only), Carl², Family Guy, Odd Job Jack, Skunk Fu!, Supernormal, Chaotic and Three Delivery. They had major clients such as I Can't Believe It's Not Butter!, Pepsi, Microsoft, and Toyota.

=== Setbacks ===
Fatkat was, at one point, considered the largest animation studio in Atlantic Canada and the fastest growing animation studio in Canada. However, after government funding for the studio dried up under the Harper government, the 2008 financial crisis occurred and the fact that the business plan didn't actually set a goal of making money, Fatkat eventually dwindled until its closure was announced in May 2009.

At the time of closure, the company was down to employing only 3 people, even though it had received $1 million in government grants since 2005 under the government.

=== 2009 ===
Fowler formed a much smaller successor studio Loogaroo in Miramichi, New Brunswick, despite the fact that he had declared insolvency with Fatkat Animation.

== Filmography ==
=== Television ===
Show	Year(s)	Co-production(s)	Note
Caillou	2002	Cookie Jar Entertainment	season 3 only
Happy Tree Friends	2006	Mondo Media	
Odd Job Jack	2006	Smiley Guy Studios	season 3; animation services
Chaotic	2006–08	Chaotic USA Entertainment Group; 4Kids Entertainment	season 1 only; additional animation
Supernormal	2007	World Leaders Entertainment; ITV Studios	animation services
Skunk Fu!	2007–08	International Rheingold Productions; Cartoon Saloon; Telegael; Hoek, Line & Thinker; Cake Entertainment	animation services
Three Delivery	2008–09	Animation Collective; PVP MEDIA	

=== Film ===
Show	Year(s)	Co-production(s)	Notes
Curious George	2006	Universal Pictures	additional animation services
