= Zafari =

- Genre: Children's television series; Adventure
- Created by: David Dozoretz
- Directed by: David Dozoretz
- Voices of: Mark Camacho; Holly Gauthier-Frankel; Brian Froud
- Composer: Rahman Altin
- Country of origin: Canada
- Original language: English
- No. of seasons: 2
- No. of episodes: 52

Production
- Executive producers: Kinga Grabinski; David Dozoretz; Jan-Fryderyk Pleszczynski
- Running time: 11 minutes
- Production company: Zafari Holdings

Original release
- Network: France Televisions; TiJi
- Release: February 5, 2018 – present

Zafari (stylized as ZAFARI) is a Canadian animated children's television series created by David Dozoretz and executive produced by Claus Tomming. Zafari premiered in July 2018 on FranceTV, NatGeoKids in Latin America, Rai Yoyo in Italy, Sony's TinyPOP network in the UK, in 2019 on Spacetoon in the Arab Countries, and is being distributed worldwide by NBCUniversal/DreamWorks. It is also airing on Amazon Prime Video worldwide and was a launch title on NBCUniversal's new streaming network Peacock.

== Premise ==
Every once in a while, Mother Nature creates animals that are born different. In Zafari, one of them, a young African bush elephant named Zoomba who is magically born with zebra stripes, is shunned from his herd as they feel he's bad luck. He goes to live with other one-of-a-kind animals in a valley at the base of Mt. Kilimanjaro. There, Zoomba learns he is perfect just the way he is, a lesson that he will eventually take back to his herd and the rest of the world.

Set in a valley at the base of Mount Kilimanjaro, the series follows the story of Zoomba, a young elephant with zebra stripes, and Quincy, a place intelligent tarsier who is often misclassified as a monkey, Pokey, a giraffe with peacock feathers, Babatua, a mandrill with penguin feathers, Antonio, a pink flamingo-colored lion, and dozens more. Zafari teaches kids that our differences should not just be tolerated, but celebrated. Zafari stars the voices of Mark Camacho, Holly Gauthier-Frankel, and Brian Froud.

Zafari is the first television show created in a real-time game engine, Epic's Unreal 4.

== Cast ==
=== Main ===
- Holly Gauthier-Frankel as Zoomba, a baby African bush elephant with zebra stripes.
- Brian Froud as Quincy, a tarsier and Antonio, a lion with flamingo feathers.
- Pauline Little as Elspeth, a goose with fox fur.
- Mark Camacho as Bubba, a hippopotamus with skunk fur.
- Mellody Hobson as Mellody, a mustang with butterfly markings.
- Cindy Davis as Renalda, a black rhinoceros with mandrill fur and Xiang, a giant panda with inverted markings.
- Terrance Scammell as Pokey, a reticulated giraffe with peacock feathers and Fan, a giant panda cub with inverted markings.
- Angela Galuppo as Frick, a red kangaroo with tiger stripes, Colette, a spider monkey with parrot feathers and Lulu, a mustang with butterfly markings.
- Richard M. Dumont as Babatua, a mandrill with penguin feathers.
- Rick Jones as Frack, a koala with cheetah spots, Spike, a rattlesnake with hedgehog spikes, Oscar, a nile crocodile with golden lion tamarin fur and Ernesto, an armadillo with a ladybug shell.
- April Star as April, a horse with butterfly markings.
