= Gamerizon =

Mobile game developer

- Type: Private
- Industry: Video games
- Founded: Montreal, Quebec, Canada (2008)
- Founder: Martin Lizée, Robert Lizée & Dominique Bélanger
- Headquarters: Montreal, Quebec, Canada
- Area served: Worldwide
- Key people: Alex Sakiz (CEO); Martin Lizée (Co-founder and Chief Creative Officer); Robert Lizée (Co-founder and Chief Technical Officer); Geri-Lynn Kushneryk (Chief Financial Officer)
- Products: "Chop Chop Ninja", "Chop Chop Runner", "Chop Chop Tennis", "Chop Chop Soccer", "Chop Chop Hockey", "'Chop Chop Caveman", "Chop Chop Kicker", "Chop Chop Rocket", "Chop Chop Slicer", "Chop Chop Ninja World"
- Number of employees: 30
- Website: gamerizon.com

Gamerizon is a video game developer and publisher headquartered in Montreal, Quebec, Canada. Gamerizon develops games for iPhone and iPad. The company's most profitable products on Apple's App Store include "Chop Chop Ninja", "Chop Chop Runner", "Chop Chop Tennis" and "Chop Chop Caveman". According to Gamerizon, 15 million "Chop Chop" games have been downloaded so far on the App Store and six of those have been downloaded a million times each. Gamerizon's Chop Chop series are easily recognizable by the cartoony look of their big-headed characters.

== History ==
In an interview to video game magazine PocketGamer, Alex Sakiz revealed the company’s ambition to expand the Chop Chop Franchise to 20 games and 40 million downloads. In the same interview, he mentioned the Chop Chop games will be available on Android phones and possibly on other platforms.

In March 2011, Gamerizon was named 32nd on PocketGamer‘s Top 50 App Developers.

On September 15 of 2011, Gamerizon announced they have closed a 5 million dollars first round investment with Vanedge Capital and iNovia Capital. The Montreal-based studio will be looking to hire 100 employees within 2 years.

In March 2012, Gamerizon announced their new project at the Game Developers Conference. Chop Chop Ninja World will be the first social freemium action platformer on both iOS and Android. Subsequently, Gamerizon was named by Pocket Gamer in its Top 10 Mobile Game Developers to Watch in 2012. Gamerizon announced on its Facebook page in October that the game will be released worldwide on November 29.

In April 2012, Gamerizon announced Iro, the main character of their hit-game Chop Chop Ninja, will be the star of his own animated series on the Canadian channel Teletoon and will air at the Fall of 2014.

In May 2012, Gamerizon's CEO Alex Sakiz was named in C2-MTL's Top 25 Emerging Entrepreneurs.

== Other projects ==
In addition to its mobile games, Gamerizon contributed to the development of the Star Citizen Web Starmap in collaboration with Turbulent and Cloud Imperium Games. The studio was responsible for developing the interactive 3D components of the front-end JavaScript client. The project received the Cutting Edge of the Year 2016 FWA Award from Adobe.
