= Chop Chop (franchise) =

- Developer: Gamerizon
- Platform: iOS

Chop Chop is a collection of iOS video games created by Gamerizon, first released in 2009. The series features a range of game genres, with a focus on action and sports, and is known for its distinctive art style. By 2011, Gamerizon reported that the series had been downloaded over 15 million times from the App Store.

The series of games then became a Canadian television series on Teletoon, produced by Sardine Productions.

== Games ==
The games listed where released for iOS by Gamerizon.

Game	Release date
Chop Chop Ninja	December 25, 2009
Chop Chop Runner	March 18, 2010
Chop Chop Tennis	May 5, 2010
Chop Chop Soccer	August 4, 2010
Chop Chop Hockey	November 3, 2010
Chop Chop Caveman	November 25, 2010
Chop Chop Kicker	March 24, 2011
Chop Chop Rocket	April 21, 2011
Chop Chop Slicer	June 9, 2011
Chop Chop Ninja World	November 29, 2012

== Animation ==
=== Shorts ===
In 2012, Gamerizon announced that an animated series based on Chop Chop Ninja was in development with Canadian broadcaster Teletoon. The following year, Teletoon officially ordered a series of 40 ninety-second shorts produced by Sardine Productions called Chop Chop Ninja Challenge. A longer form series was also announced to be in development.

Chop Chop Ninja Challenge debuted on Teletoon and Télétoon in Canada on November 8, 2014. The series was later aired in over 100 markets globally.

=== TV series ===
After the shorts proved successful, Teletoon approved the production of a longer series in March 2016. Produced by Sardine Productions, the series, titled Chop Chop Ninja, includes 40 eleven-minute episodes or 20 twenty-two-minute episodes. It debuted on in French on Télétoon on September 3, 2018. The English-language premiere aired on Teletoon on October 6, 2018.

=== Episodes ===
==== Interstitials (2014) ====
There were ten interstitial episodes. Each character does the challenge and the interstitials air for one-and-a-half minutes.

- Hang a Picture (November 8, 2014)
- Catch the Fly (November 15, 2014)
- Catch the Fish (November 22, 2014)
- Get Candy (November 29, 2014)
- Light the Torch (December 6, 2014)
- Steal the Golden Egg (December 13, 2014)
- Put the Monkey in the Barrel (December 20, 2014)
- Ring the Bell (December 27, 2014)
- Save the Waka (January 3, 2015)
- Extinguish the Volcano (January 10, 2015)

==== Season 1 (2018) ====
- Season 1 premiered in Canada on October 6, 2018, and ended on December 9, 2018.

No.	Title	Directed by	Written by	Storyboard by	Original release date	American air date	Prod. code	US viewers (millions)
1	"Iro the Daring"	Suren Perera	Kevin Shustack	Didier Loubat & Yann Ben Alluch	October 6, 2018	TBA	TBA	N/A
1	"Pretty Li'l Pet"	Suren Perera	Paul Stoica	Michel Carbonneau	October 6, 2018	TBA	TBA	N/A
2	"Chop Chop Not!"	Suren Perera	Allen Markuze	Alexei Kazakov	October 7, 2018	TBA	TBA	N/A
2	"Annual Attack"	Suren Perera	Paul Stoica	Yann Ben Alluch	October 7, 2018	TBA	TBA	N/A
3	"Open House"	Suren Perera	Anne-Marie Perrotta	Zee Risek	October 13, 2018	TBA	TBA	N/A
3	"Two Cool Dudes"	Suren Perera	Paul Stoica	Michelle Ku	October 13, 2018	TBA	TBA	N/A
4	"Tetsuo the Bully"	Suren Perera	Lisa Hunter	Raphaele Bard	October 14, 2018	TBA	TBA	N/A
4	"Neeko's Dojo"	Suren Perera	Pat Dussault	Yann Ben Alluch	October 14, 2018	TBA	TBA	N/A
5	"Clone General"	Suren Perera	Lisa Hunter	Aidan Casserly	October 20, 2018	TBA	TBA	N/A
5	"Jo and Yuki BFF's"	Suren Perera	Gerard Lewis & Dominic Webber	Mike Horowitz	October 20, 2018	TBA	TBA	N/A
6	"Who is Chop Chop?"	Suren Perera	Allen Markuze	Norman J. Leblanc	October 21, 2018	TBA	TBA	N/A
6	"Masako"	Suren Perera	Kevin Shustack	Raphaele Bard	October 21, 2018	TBA	TBA	N/A
7	"Substitute Sharp"	Suren Perera	Kevin Shustack	Zee Risek	October 27, 2018	TBA	TBA	N/A
7	"Camping at Kami's"	Suren Perera	Paul Stoica	Yann Ben Alluch	October 27, 2018	TBA	TBA	N/A
8	"Neeko Prankster"	Suren Perera	Shane Simmons	Glen Kennedy	October 28, 2018	TBA	TBA	N/A
8	"Iro's Skill Scam"	Suren Perera	Richard Clark	Mike Horowitz	October 28, 2018	TBA	TBA	N/A
9	"General Chicken"	Suren Perera	Kevin Shustack	Amélie Sakelaris, Alex Basio & Francis Goulet	November 3, 2018	TBA	TBA	N/A
9	"Magic Sandwich"	Suren Perera	Kevin Shustack	Alexei Kazakov	November 3, 2018	TBA	TBA	N/A
10	"Island Fever"	Suren Perera	Richard Clark	Aidan Casserly	November 4, 2018	TBA	TBA	N/A
10	"Secret Mission!"	Suren Perera	Pat Dussault	Raphaele Bard & Amélie Sakelaris	November 4, 2018	TBA	TBA	N/A
11	"Not-So-Nice Niece!"	Suren Perera	Shawn Kalb	Yann Ben Alluch	November 10, 2018	TBA	TBA	N/A
11	"Lady Ninja"	Suren Perera	Lisa Hunter	Alexei Kazakov	November 10, 2018	TBA	TBA	N/A
12	"Yuki's Resort"	Suren Perera	Pat Dussault	Faisal Raja	November 11, 2018	TBA	TBA	N/A
12	"Rizon Awards"	Suren Perera	Kevin Shustack	Aidan Casserly	November 11, 2018	TBA	TBA	N/A
13	"Neeko's Amnesia"	Suren Perera	Paul Stoica	Zee Risek	November 17, 2018	TBA	TBA	N/A
13	"Iro's Orb"	Suren Perera	Richard Clark	Aidan Casserly	November 17, 2018	TBA	TBA	N/A
14	"Lights, Camera, Ninja!"	Suren Perera	Stephen Senders	Alexei Kazakov	November 18, 2018	TBA	TBA	N/A
14	"Neeko Princess"	Suren Perera	Shane Simmons	Zee Risek	November 18, 2018	TBA	TBA	N/A
15	"Evil Plants"	Suren Perera	Kevin Shustack	Alexei Kazakov	November 24, 2018	TBA	TBA	N/A
15	"Doom's-Day-Putt!"	Suren Perera	Kevin Shustack	Charles-Alexandre Gauthier	November 24, 2018	TBA	TBA	N/A
16	"Selfie Stick Sorcery"	Suren Perera	Allen Markuze	Aidan Casserly	November 25, 2018	TBA	TBA	N/A
16	"Mama Tetsuo"	Suren Perera	Richard Clark	Alexei Kazakov	November 25, 2018	TBA	TBA	N/A
17	"Mother Enoki"	Suren Perera	Pat Dussault	Faisal Raja	December 1, 2018	TBA	TBA	N/A
17	"Iro's Quadrant"	Suren Perera	Kevin Shustack	Charles-Alexandre Gauthier	December 1, 2018	TBA	TBA	N/A
18	"Now What?"	Suren Perera	Kevin Shustack	Aidan Casserly	December 2, 2018	TBA	TBA	N/A
18	"Kami's Heat"	Suren Perera	Pat Dussault	Aidan Casserly	December 2, 2018	TBA	TBA	N/A
19	"The Sceptre of Movement"	Suren Perera	Paul Stoica & Alexandre Riendeau	Jeremy O'Neill	December 8, 2018	TBA	TBA	N/A
19	"Guest of Honour"	Suren Perera	Kevin Shustack	Jeremy O'Neill	December 8, 2018	TBA	TBA	N/A
20	"In Charge"	Suren Perera	Paul Stoica & Alexandre Riendeau	Kevin Currie	December 9, 2018	TBA	TBA	N/A
20	"Heart"	Suren Perera	Kevin Shustack	Alexei Kazakov	December 9, 2018	TBA	TBA	N/A
