= Toon-A-Vision =

- Toon-A-Vision logo
- Country: Canada
- Broadcast area: Nationwide
- Headquarters: Dartmouth, Nova Scotia

Programming
- Picture format: 720p (HDTV); 480i (SDTV)

Ownership
- Owner: Atlantic Digital Networks

History
- Launched: June 19, 2018, 7 years ago

Links
- Website: Toon-A-Vision

Toon-A-Vision is a Canadian English language discretionary service television channel owned by Atlantic Digital Networks that launched on June 19, 2018. The channel broadcasts animated programming aimed at preschoolers and teenagers. Its name is a portmanteau of "cartoon" and "television".

== History ==
Atlantic Digital Networks received Category B-exemption from the Canadian Radio-television and Telecommunications Commission (CRTC) for a television service called "Atlantic Cartoon" in 2014. The channel, now known as Toon-A-Vision, launched on Eastlink cable systems throughout Canada in high definition on June 19, 2018. It was developed in conjunction with Huminah Huminah Animation. On July 15, 2019, Atlantic Digital Networks requested the CRTC transfer the channel to a full license after surpassing the commission's subscriber threshold. Its license was approved on September 1, 2020.

The channel was added to Bell Satellite TV and Bell Fibe on December 5, 2019. Cogeco launched the channel on its platforms on April 22, 2020.

== Programming ==
=== Current programming ===
- ABC Monsters
- Albi the Snowman
- Blue Fish Nursery Rhymes
- Buzz Bumble
- Chaotic
- Chilly Beach
- Chuck Chicken
- Devilled Eggz
- Dex Hamilton: Alien Entomologist
- Dive, Olly, Dive
- Doki
- Dragamonz
- Eddie is a Yeti
- Future Card Buddyfight X
- G2G: Got To Go!
- Ghosts of Time
- GoGo Dino Explorers
- Hatchimals: Adventures in Hatchtopia
- The Hive
- I'm A Dinosaur
- I.N.K. Invisible Network of Kids
- Jack
- Jar Dwellers SOS
- Kagagi: The Raven
- Kikoriki
- Leon
- Maddie's Do You Know?
- Manon
- Maple Shorts
- Mia
- Mofy
- My Goldfish Is Evil!
- Oh Yuck!
- Origanimals
- Pet Alien
- Pet Squad
- Pin Code
- Piper’s Pony Tales
- Redakai
- Ricky Sprocket: Showbiz Boy
- Sindbad & the 7 Galaxies
- Skyland
- Smighties
- Talking Tom & Friends
- Tenkai Knights
- The Fairytaler
- Timeblazers
- Tina and Tony
- Toot the Tiny Tugboat
- Wild Grinders
- WonderBalls!
- Yam Roll
- Zo Zo Zombie

=== Reruns ===
- The Adventures of Annie & Ben (September 2021)
- Bat Pat (November 27, 2021)

=== Former programming ===
- Aesop's Theater
- Baby Genius
- Best Ed
- Bunny Ninja
- Ever After High
- Get Well Soon
- Gisele and the Green Team
- Hareport
- The Haunting Hour: The Series
- Horrid Henry
- King Arthur's Disasters
- Kipper
- Little Princess
- Magic Academy
- Martha & Friends
- Monster by Mistake
- Monster High
- Parallel Parker
- Paw Patrol
- Percy the Park Keeper
- Pingu
- Secret Millionaires Club
- Skunk Fu!
- Space POP
- Thomas Edison's Secret Lab
- Tom and the Slice of Bread with Strawberry Jam and Honey
- Uncle Joe's Cartoon Playhouse
- WrestleVille
- Yu-Gi-Oh! Zexal
