= March Entertainment =

Canadian animation production company

March Entertainment was a Canadian animation studio of digital animated entertainment for television and the World Wide Web. The company's properties include the television series Chilly Beach, Maple Shorts, Yam Roll, and Dex Hamilton.

Founded as Infopreneur in 1996 by Dan Hawes and Doug Sinclair as a producer of web content, March Entertainment's Chilly Beach Flash animation series would be broadcast on CBC Television starting in 2003. The property also yielded two movies, The World is Hot Enough and The Canadian President. In 2011, the series launched in the U.S. on the streaming video website Hulu; the series had also been available on iTunes. Their series Yam Roll also made it to Hulu via Catherine Tait's distributor Duopoly Inc, which also released Smiley Guy Studios' Odd Job Jack.

In 2007, the company co-produced the series Dex Hamilton: Alien Entomologist with Australia's SLR Productions. The company also co-produced G2G: Got to Go, which aired on Australia's Nine Network in September 2008 and before airing on Canada's CBC-TV.

In 2009, March produced its first and only animated movie for toymaker Playmobil, entitled The Secret of Pirate Island. The company was in production for a second DVD movie, which has since been scrapped.

March animated season 1 of Mia and Me, an international co-production with Rainbow S.p.A., broadcaster ZDF and Lucky Punch. The show, which mixes live action and CGI animation, was the most requested program at 2010s MIPJunior conference.

March Entertainment was also responsible for the websites iLaugh and Edge of Toon.

The company went into decline in the early 2010s, despite an investment of provincial funds, and was ultimately succeeded by Toonrush.

The company's head office was in Toronto and it had an animation studio located in Sudbury, before closing in 2013.

== Works ==
- Chilly Beach (2003–2008)
- Faireez (2005, distributed with Southern Star Group)
- Maple Shorts! (2005)
- The Very Good Adventures of Yam Roll in Happy Kingdom (2006)
- Uncle Joe's Cartoon Playhouse (2006)
- Chilly Beach: The World Is Hot Enough (2008)
- G2G: Got to Go! (2008)
- Pet Squad (2010)
- Chilly Beach: The Canadian President (2008)
- Dex Hamilton: Alien Entomologist (2008–2009)
- Playmobil: The Secret of Pirate Island (2009)
- Mia and Me (2012) (season 1 only)
