= List of Chilly Beach episodes =

A list of episodes of the Canadian animated television series Chilly Beach. There are 65 episodes spanning across 3 seasons, airing from 2003 to 2008.

== Episodes ==
=== Season 1 (2003–04) ===
No. overall	No. in season	Title	Original release date	Prod. code
1	1	"Separation Anxiety"	September 3, 2003	101
Dale and Frank disagree as hockey fans, in a battle that resembles the real ongoing struggle between "Toronto" and Montreal" fans.
2	2	"Pucked in the Head"	September 17, 2003	102
Frank loses his memory after getting hit in the head by a slap-shot. Later Frank disappears and Dale realizes that Frank is the only one who knows the combination to the town's "beer vault".
3	3	"Love Potion Undetermined"	September 24, 2003	103
Abby's pheromone experiment leads to an unnatural love triangle.
4	4	"Shut Your Space Hole"	October 1, 2003	104
When a black hole threatens earth, it is up to Frank to come up with the true solution that will save the day.
5	5	"Go Figure"	June 4, 2004	105
A travelling ice show makes its way to Chilly Beach. Leading it is Elvis Stojko. When they stop into Chilly Beach, no one liked it at all except for Michel, who decides to leave and join the show.
6	6	"Fever Tale"	October 22, 2003	106
When Abby finds out that her mother plans to move the family to Alaska, she fakes an illness in an effort to stop the move. However, her "illness" causes an epidemic of fear.
7	7	"Angus Rex"	November 5, 2003	107
A frozen dinosaur, discovered under Dale's house, comes to life and wreaks havoc in Chilly Beach.
8	8	"Invasion of the Beer Snatchers"	September 10, 2003	108
After Frank is abducted by aliens it takes all of Dale's wits to manage to save the day.
9	9	"Polar Opposites"	June 9, 2004	109
Chilly Beach becomes the dump site for Toronto's garbage, but with the new dump comes an evil polar bear.
10	10	"The Chilly Beachcombers"	November 12, 2003	110
Dale is excited that he will be able to watch the "missing" episode of his favorite show "The Beachcombers", but after he misses his chance to see it he discovers that it will be later showing in Iceland.
11	11	"Power Pray"	October 15, 2003	111
Dale becomes coach of the Pee Wee Hockey Team when Jacques gets injured.
12	12	"Lord of the Ringettes"	November 19, 2003	112
Dale and Frank's hockey team plays April's team in a game of ringette.
13	13	"Cold War"	June 14, 2004	113
When two Russian soldiers arrive in Chilly Beach from drifting iceberg, it takes Dale and Frank shrewd negotiation skills to relieve tensions.
14	14	"Slush Fund"	June 23, 2004	114
Chilly Beach's tourist trade is dwindling, but Dale and Frank discover a new natural resource that can be exploited for cash.
15	15	"Country Cooking"	February 5, 2003	115
Dale and Frank travel to Ottawa to get support for a petition to allow street hockey on all streets in Canada, but they find out that Chilly Beach is not actually part of Canada. So, they decide to make Chilly Beach its own country.
16	16	"Hollywood Far North"	December 10, 2003	116
A movie director plans to blow up Chilly Beach as a special effects spectacle.
17	17	"Pity Slickers"	October 29, 2003	117
April gets the help of a celebrity to help her "save the seals". However it turns out that it is really the help of Dale and Frank that winds up saving the day.
18	18	"Superzeroes"	July 1, 2004	118
Dale and Frank discover that there perks in being "superheroes" but they soon find out that with great power comes great responsibility.
19	19	"Secret Santa"	December 17, 2003	119
When Santa decides he needs a break from his duties, he comes to Chilly beach and hangs out with Dale. With the holidays fast approaching it is up to Frank and Dale to help Santa get back on track and save Christmas.
20	20	"Natural Born Curlers"	December 3, 2003	120
After the town discovers that Angus is a fantastic curling ice maker, they are disappointed when he makes a choice of his family over the townspeople.
21	21	"Dale to the Chief"	June 8, 2004	121
After Air Force One stops in Chilly beach to refuel, the President of the United States gets left behind. Soon, in a strange twist, Dale becomes the presidential adviser.
22	22	"The Song Remains So Lame"	June 17, 2004	122
When Dale and Frank restart their old high school garage band a music producer becomes interested in representing them. Unfortunately she is only interested in Frank.
23	23	"The Beer Hunters"	November 26, 2003	123
After the beer delivery truck gets lost, due to Dales incompetence, Dale must rally the town and find the missing truck.
24	24	"Brother's Day"	June 24, 2004	124
It's Dale's birthday and he thinks no one remembered. However he gets a surprise when his older more successful brother Dave comes to town.
25	25	"My Big Fat Creep Wedding"	June 21, 2004	125
Dale steps in as Abby's father at the three legged race at the Father/Daughter picnic. What he did not figure on is that the win might lead to bigger things.
26	26	"Slushbucklers"	July 2, 2004	126
After the antiques show comes to Chilly Beach Jacques discovers that he is a cursed ancestor of the pirate "Blackboard".

=== Season 2 (2004–06) ===
No. overall	No. in season	Title	Original release date	Prod. code
27	1	"Syruptitious"	December 28, 2004	201
The boys are upset when maple syrup gets outlawed at Chilly Beach, until Mr. Biggs starts up an illegal maple syrup bar.
28	2	"Polargeist"	October 26, 2004	202
Dale and Frank are in Dale's house putting up "wrapping paper" when they discover a haunted hockey locker room. Dale gets pulled into the Spirit World where Death mistakes him as someone else.
29	3	"Training Daze"	November 23, 2004	203
When the Toronto Ptarmigans come to Chilly Beach to train at the local rink, someone is tampering with the ice because it has frozen trash in it, leaving suspicion on Dale.
30	4	"The Nature of Wings"	November 16, 2004	204
When an endangered bird flies into Chilly Beach and nestles in the hockey rink, David Suzuki declares the rink an Ecological Site, therefore leaving Dale jobless and able to put the whole town in danger.
31	5	"Bitter Grounds"	October 12, 2004	205
Jacques' old friend comes to Chilly Beach and opens up a coffee stand, trying to run him out of business.
32	6	"Aurora Beerealis"	October 5, 2004	206
After Dale messes with the northern lights, the whole town becomes hypnotized.
33	7	"Not Without My Yeti"	December 7, 2004	207
It's Dale and Frank to the rescue when xenophobic Angus captures a yeti and the yeti's family comes looking.
34	8	"Full Moon Wiener"	October 19, 2004	208
Somebody in Chilly Beach (We're not telling who) is bitten by a wiener dog and changes into a cuddly and vicious ankle-biting monster.
35	9	"Winning Freak"	November 30, 2004	209
Dale gets hooked on energy bars, enjoying the performance enhancing benefits until he starts to mutate.
36	10	"Hard Time in Chilly Beach"	February 1, 2005	210
Constable Al throws a bunch of raucous hockey fans into jail, but Frank figures that Team Canada will lose without the fans, so he springs them loose.
37	11	"Canada Joy Land"	January 4, 2005	211
When a Japanese businessman decides to build a new Canada themed amusement park he hires Dale and Frank as technical consultants.
38	12	"Tower of Babble"	January 25, 2005	212
The popularity of cell phones in Chilly Beach causes the phone company to install a brand new cell phone tower, however the tower attracts killer bees.
39	13	"The Souse That Roared"	November 2, 2004	213
When an object from space falls into Chilly Beach, Frank takes the plutonium that was in it. The USA thinks that Frank is using it to create weapons of mass destruction, and gives Chilly Beach 48 hours to hand it over, so Frank has to create a bomb and hand it over in order to prevent the town from being blown up.
40	14	"Chilly Beach We Have a Problem"	November 9, 2004	214
The US Government needs to get the media off their back, so Katherine gives them an idea to fake a Pluto landing on the outskirts of Chilly Beach. Frank stumbles upon the "Pluto Landing" site and is mistaken for an alien. Katherine tells Frank that he'll be a part of a "secret" space mission, that no one shall know about.
41	15	"Fortune Kooky"	January 18, 2005	215
An accidental electric jolt gives Jacques the power to see into the future.
42	16	"Spiritual Matters"	January 11, 2005	216
A visiting spiritual leader proclaims Dale as the "great guru". Things get weird until Canadian rocker Lawrence Gowan comes to the rescue.
43	17	"Driving Mr. Biggs"	March 1, 2005	217
Mr. Biggs is running for election and he hires Dale to help him take on a fast talking competitor.
44	18	"You've Got Meat"	February 8, 2005	218
In a crazy love triangle, Jacques is in love with the new female butcher, who is in love with Dale. Sparks fly as Jacques takes on his competition.
45	19	"Love Conquers Al"	March 29, 2005	219
When Constable Al meets the woman of his dreams, he is blinded by love, and oblivious to her criminal behavior.
46	20	"Employee of the Beer"	March 15, 2005	220
Frank gets to live his dreams when he gets a job in a brewery in Moose Jaw. Unfortunately, all is not as great as he thinks it will be.
47	21	"Bearly Vegan"	February 15, 2005	221
The Bear decides to give up meat, and everything is going great until he goes through withdrawal.
48	22	"Dr. Dale"	February 22, 2005	222
When Chilly Beach gets a new TV station Dale stars in his own "Dr. Phil" style advice program.
49	23	"Christmas Inc."	December 21, 2004	223
When Frank is appointed as Santa's financial adviser, he turns Santa's north pole operation into a capitalist money-grubbing operation.
50	24	"What's Yours Is Mined"	March 8, 2005	224
Angus, Dale, Frank and the Bear are trapped in a mountain cabin with a cache of diamonds. Who will survive the ordeal? Who will get the diamonds? Does anyone trust anyone else?
51	25	"Lumberjackapalooza"	March 22, 2005	225
Dale figures he can impress April with his skills in chainsaw tree carving.
52	26	"Yank My Doodle"	January 10, 2006	226
Dale adjusts to life in the fat lane after he's granted an honorary American citizenship.

=== Season 3 (2007–08) ===
No. overall	No. in season	Title	Original release date	Prod. code
53	1	"Resident Aliens"	October 6, 2007	301
Frank is abducted by aliens, whom he invites to live in Chilly Beach.
54	2	"Dale Where's My Country"	October 13, 2007	302
Katherine is stripped of her ambassador position. Unable to go back to the United States, she attempts to adjust to Canadian culture and live on her own as a citizen of Chilly Beach.
55	3	"How to Succeed in Government Without Really Caring"	October 27, 2007	303
When Dale is invited to spy on the government to earn extra money, he discovers that Parliament member Antoine DelVecchio is stealing tax dollars, causing Antoine to lose everything he has and forcing him to move to Chilly Beach.
56	4	"It's Not You, It's Meat"	December 1, 2007	304
On Schmoopsie's Day, Jacques' girlfriend Lucretia objects to his gift, so she forces him to go on a relationship retreat hosted by Constable Al.
57	5	"Coalition of the Unwilling"	December 8, 2007	305
When Dale accidentally destroys the plumbing of Chilly Beach, all of the town’s water heaters besides his are destroyed. Katherine attempts to convince Dale to give her the last remaining water heater by any means necessary.
58	6	"15 Minutes of Lame"	December 22, 2007	306
Jacques is given a role in a TV show based on his life.
59	7	"Dislodged"	December 29, 2007	307
Dale and Frank are involved in a war between two bowling lodges over an ancient chalice.
60	8	"One Flew Over the Ptarmigan's Nest"	January 5, 2008	308
Since Frank is a Toronto Ptarmigans fan, while Dale is a Montreal Torchieres fan, Dale commits Frank to a mental hospital.
61	9	"General Discontent"	January 12, 2008	309
Frank is appointed as the new Governor General of Canada.
62	10	"Triplets of Hellville"	February 16, 2008	310
When Dale and Frank lose their hockey puck shortly before the town loses power, Jacques tells them a series of three scary stories.
63	11	"Hole in None"	April 12, 2008	311
When Dale and Frank’s usual hockey rink is under renovation, they build a golf course, and a tournament unfolds.
64	12	"Draft Dodgers of the 20.7th Century"	April 26, 2008	312
Dale and Frank meet Bongo Charlie, a hippie draft dodger who has been living in a cave underneath Chilly Beach since 1972. They reintroduce him into society, which of course, goes very wrong.
65	13	"The Tooth Is Out There"	May 3, 2008	313
Dale and Frank inadvertently make a cure for the common cold, using a mix of Jacques’ tooth, Frank’s science, and Dale’s stupidity.

== Films (2008) ==
No.	Title	Original release date
1	"The World Is Hot Enough"	February 5, 2008
Dale wonders why no one ever visits Chilly Beach, and realizes that it's due to the cold climate. Thus, Frank invents a super heater to warm Chilly Beach up. When the U.S. learns about it, they steal it and accidentally use it to destroy the planet. Frank and Dale must travel back through time to undo the damage.
2	"The Canadian President"	2008
Following the take-over of Canada by the United States through "asking nicely", Dale is forced into the position of President of the United States by the scheming Hangelberg Group. However, the incompetent Dale proves harder to control than intended, and he and Frank work to defeat the Group's efforts to brainwash all of Canada through micro-chipping.
