= Jacqueline Pillon =

Canadian voice actress

- Born: Jacqueline Patricia Pillon; December 27; Windsor, Ontario, Canada
- Occupation: Actress
- Years active: 1993–present

Jacqueline Patricia Pillon (born December 27) is a Canadian actress.

== Early life ==
Pillon was born in Windsor, Ontario, the youngest of four children to Eileen (née Corriveau) and Raymond Pillon. She was educated and graduated from the renowned Monsignor Feeney Choir school in London. She ultimately graduated with an Hon. B.Sc. in physical anthropology from the University of Toronto.

== Career ==
At the age of 12, she started her first work in theatre. As a voice actress, she first appeared in Gahan Wilson's The Kid as the title character. Other roles included Jane Doe, Crossed Over, Master Spy: The Robert Hanssen Story, and Gilda Radner: It's Always Something as comedy writer Anne Beatts. She also appeared in Queer as Folk and Street Time.

Her first major animation role was Matt in the PBS animated series Cyberchase. Her voice has been featured in Medabots, Chilly Beach, Odd Job Jack, and Fugget About It. She starred in the Christmas special A Very Barry Christmas opposite Colin Mochrie. She used to provide the voice for the W Network in Canada before she was replaced.

== Filmography ==
Film
Year	Title	Role	Notes
1993	Little Devils: The Birth	Devils	
2001	The Kid	The Kid (voice)	Lead role
2001	Jane Doe	Tech #1 in Data Processing	
2002	Crossed Over	Inmate	
2002	Gilda Radner: It's Always Something	Anne Beatts	
2002	Master Spy: The Robert Hanssen Story	FBI Agent	
2002	The Interrogation of Michael Crowe	Officer Valinski	
2003	Open House	Linda	
2004	Evel Knievel	Snake River Reporter	
2004	The Wool Cap	Signing Woman	
2005	Trump Unauthorized	Karen Dalton	
2005	A Very Barry Christmas	Nutmeg (voice)	
2005	Shania: A Life in Eight Albums	Lucinda	
2005	Recipe for a Perfect Christmas	Sondra Sumner	
2006	Man of the Year	Security Tech	
2008	Dawgs Playing Poker	Biscapone	
2008	XIII: The Conspiracy	XX	

Television
Year	Title	Role	Notes
1999	System Crash	Ms. Flowers	Recurring role
2000–2001	La Femme Nikita	Bodyguard/Bookstore Op	Episodes "Toys in the Basement" and "All the World's a Stage"
2001	High Tech Toys	Haley (voice)	Host and narrator
2001	Medabots	Rintaro Namishima (voice)	English dub
2001	Blue Murder	Janice Anders	Episode "Collateral Damage"
2002–present	Cyberchase	Matt (voice)	Lead role
2002	Moville Mysteries	Mele "Sharon" Kalikimaka (voice)	Episode "Crushed By an Angel"
2003	Odd Job Jack	Small Boy/School Girl (voices)	Episode "Iron Temp"
2003	Street Time	Linda Grady	Recurring role
2003	Starhunter	Gina	Episode "Torment"
2003	Sue Thomas: F.B.Eye	Cathy Cooper	Episode "Cold Case"
2003–2004	Chilly Beach	Michel Mabuis (voice)	Supporting role
2004	Missing	Lucette Pecci	Episode "Truth or Dare: Part 1"
2004–2005	Queer as Folk	Amber Morgan-Leeson	Recurring role
2005	Kojak	Andy	Episode "All That Glitters"
2005–2010	Mayday	Flight Attentant Robin Fech/LAX Tower Controller Robin Wascher	Episodes "A Wounded Bird" and "Cleared for Disaster"
2006	Captain Flamingo	Menu Kid 2 (voice)	Episode "Pancake Panic"
2008	Heartland	Mrs. Wiley	Episode "Born to Run"
2008	The Border	Doctor Georgina Murphy	Episode "Restricted Access"
2009	Busytown Mysteries	Additional voices	Episode "The Mystery of the Mumbling Mummy/The False Alarm Mystery", credited as Jacqueline Pilon
2012–2016	Fugget About It	Cookie Falcone (voice)	Lead role, credited as Jackie Pillon
2021–present	Glowbies	Seventy (voice)	Recurring role
