= Warren United =

- Genre: Comedy
- Country of origin: United Kingdom
- Original language: English
- No. of series: 1
- No. of episodes: 6

Production
- Production companies: Baby Cow Productions, Smiley Guy Studios

Original release
- Network: ITV4
- Release: 22 April – 27 May 2014

Warren United is a British animated comedy series centred on Warren Kingsley, a football fanatic whose interest in the sport is starting to impinge on his family life.

The show was cancelled after one series due to poor ratings. Warren United began airing on 22 April 2014 on ITV4.

== Plot ==
The series centres on Warren Kingsley, a 37½-year-old kitchen salesman who supports a football team called Brainsford United. He lives with his family which includes his wife Ingrid, their 13-year-old daughter Charlie and 7-year-old son Harrison, Warren's mother and her French-Canadian boyfriend Reggie.

== Production ==
The show's working title was The Wild World of Warren.

== Cast and characters ==
- Darren Boyd as Warren Kingsley
- Eleanor Lawrence as Ingrid Kingsley, Warren's wife from Eindhoven
- Morgana Robinson as Charlotte "Charlie" Kingsley, their 13-year-old daughter
- Morwenna Banks as Harrison Kingsley, their 7-year-old son
- Nitin Ganatra as Dilip, Warren's best friend
- Georgie Glen as Warren's mother
- Tony Law as Reggie, her French-Canadian boyfriend
- Johnny Vegas as Fat Baz, the manager of Brainsford United
- Jonathan Kydd as Burger Al, the owner of a burger van, and as Trevor, a Police Horse
- Robert Portal as Michael, a Police Horse
- Clive Tyldesley as The Commentator

== Episode guide ==
No.	Title	Directed by	Written by	Original release date
1	"July"	Unknown	Unknown	22 April 2014
An opposition own goal scored six minutes into stoppage time in the last game of the season keeps Brainsford up. Warren is over the moon until he realises that the first pre-season friendly won’t be for six whole weeks. Dillip tries to help by taking Warren to the cricket. It doesn’t work. Reggie tries to divert him but Warren is unswayed. Finally Ingrid organises some drastic help. Will Warren finally get a result?
2	"True Colours"	Unknown	Unknown	29 April 2014
There's a big cup match for Brainsford United coming up and Warren is beside himself with excitement. They’ve signed a new striker called Ronaldinho, there’s a cheerleader initiative and it might be sunny. Warren persuades Ingrid and Harrison to join him in painting their faces in the team colours: "Everyone else is doing it." Except they aren’t. The Meringues are 5-0 down at half-time; it starts to rain; then the cheerleader pyramid collapses. It's OK though, they'll just wash off the face paint. Except Warren has used indelible enamel paint. Once a Meringue always a Meringue - unless perhaps like Ingrid and Harrison you would prefer not to be.
3	"Mascot"	Unknown	Unknown	6 May 2014
Harrison is chosen to be the mascot at the next Brainsford home game. Warren is ecstatic. The rest of the world less so. When Dave Worsely, Mr Kitchen Madness himself, summons Warren to his office to tell him that he wants his son to take Harrison’s place. Warren won’t sell out, will he? Even for the money he needs for a cataract operation for his mum? What will he do when all his plans take a huge setback?
4	"There is Only One Warren Kingsley"	Unknown	Unknown	13 May 2014
"There is Only One Warren Kingsley ". Or is there? When the Luxor brothers mistakenly spend £50m on a new striker you would think Warren would be happy. Not only is he good-looking and a model citizen but he can actually play. The only problem is that his name is Warren Kingsley – the very same as our story's hero. Warren’s dreams of running onto the pitch as the crowd sing "There’s only one Warren Kingsley" are suddenly just that - dreams. As he so simply puts it, "I was unique. And now I’m two-nique". Meanwhile, Mum seems to be acting strangely. Can things get any worse?
5	"Sponsorship"	Unknown	Unknown	20 May 2014
After a run of bad results Brainsford lose their shirt sponsor and may have to sell players. Warren is devastated, but after a conversation with Dilip, he has a brainwave. He suggests a sponsorship deal to his boss at Kitchen Madness, involving replacing the locker of every player with a replica 1960s kitchen and the tunnel to the pitch being covered in a granite work-top from the 1970s range. Can better kitchen fittings prepare a win for the Meringues? Or has Warren set in motion Brainsford's biggest disaster?
6	"Billionaire"	Unknown	Unknown	27 May 2014
Brainsford’s arch rivals, Altonbury Rovers, have just been taken over by billionaire Middle Eastern owners who plan to buy the whole Brazil team and, if it isn’t available, the Argentina one. Warren is in despair. He hates the Rovers’ new owners. In fact, Warren hates all billionaire owners, unless they buy Brainsford. All he wants is for the Meringues to buy some new players and win something - anything. Anyone can understand that, right? Wrong. Warren soon finds himself in trouble with the police.
