= Pillars of Freedom =

Pillars of Freedom is a children's series created by Smiley Guy Studios Inc. and Nexus Media Inc. for TVO to teach children the importance of civics and voting. The plot follows two young dragons called Spirit and Imm who are trying to restore freedom to their kingdom of Moltonia from the reign of the oppressive Mayor Crag. As Spirit and Imm stand up for their rights based on the Canadian Charter of Rights and Freedoms they unlock the seven forgotten Pillars of Freedom and defeat the mayor in the coming election.

The seven pillars of freedom are Freedom of conscience, Freedom of expression, Freedom of speech, Freedom of assembly, Freedom of association, Freedom of the press, and the Freedom to protest. The online quest game explores the concepts introduced in the television shorts in greater detail regarding the Charter freedoms and topics of municipal civics and allows kids to vote on what they think the characters should do next and receive feedback on these choices. In season 2, which was announced in 2011, the issues of municipal civics and civil planning are explored in greater detail.
