= List of Odd Job Jack episodes =

This is a list of episodes of the Canadian adult animated comedy series Odd Job Jack. Initially airing on The Comedy Network from March 5, 2003 to October 14, 2007, a total of 52 episodes were produced in the span of 4 seasons, each with 13 episodes.

== Series overview ==
| Season | Episodes | Originally released | |
| Season | Episodes | First released | Last released |
|---|---|---|---|
| 1 | 13 | March 5, 2003 | July 31, 2004 |
| 2 | 13 | July 23, 2005 | October 15, 2005 |
| 3 | 13 | July 22, 2006 | October 14, 2006 |
| 4 | 13 | July 22, 2007 | October 14, 2007 |

== Episodes ==
Season 1 premiered on March 5, 2003 and initially concluded on April 9, 2003 until then resuming on June 19, 2004 until ending on July 31, 2004. The first six episodes used a more crude animation style. The next seven episodes switched this style to a more vibrant, nicely-drawn style.

Note: This season was never rereleased on Hulu. There are currently no available English copies on the internet for episodes 7-10; and 12.

=== Season 1 (2003-04) ===
| No. overall | No. in season | Title | Directed by | Written by | Original release date |
|---|---|---|---|---|---|
| 1 | 1 | "Death and Life" | Denny Silverthorne | Jeremy Diamond | March 5, 2003 |
After graduating from university with massive debt, Jack signs up for a job at the Odd Jobs temp agency and meets his career counsellor, Betty Styles. For his first job, he works as a mortician's assistant, during which he locks himself in the freezer.
| 2 | 2 | "I Watch the Watchmen" | Adrian Carter | Jeremy Diamond | March 12, 2003 |
Jack works as a security guard at a widget company and is tasked with figuring out the culprit when the Widget Supreme is stolen. Meanwhile, his friend Leopold Trench hacks and hijacks a spy satellite.
| 3 | 3 | "The Wheel is Not Enough" | Denny Silverthorne | Jeremy Diamond | March 19, 2003 |
While working as a hamster wrangler for famous rodents on a hit film series, Jack and Gary Gerbil, the star of the show, prevent Gary's arch nemesis from destroying the world. Guest star: Dave Foley as Gary Gerbil
| 4 | 4 | "Easy Ryder" | Adrian Carter | Jeremy Diamond | March 26, 2003 |
Despite objections from his family, Jack works as a test subject at a pharmaceutical company. While on the job, he wonders if an encounter with his estranged father was reality, or just a hallucination.
| 5 | 5 | "Waiting for Gordo" | Denny Silverthorne | Jeremy Diamond | April 2, 2003 |
Jack works as a waiter at a ritzy restaurant. When the staff begins to disappear, Jack realizes it's either eat or be eaten in the world of high class cookery. Meanwhile, Jack and his friend Bobby Lee (a.k.a. DJ Sherpa) attend a rave and stay out far too late.
| 6 | 6 | "Go West Young Ryder" | Adrian Carter | Jeremy Diamond | April 9, 2003 |
Jack reminisces with Betty about his best job ever: It was back in his college years, and he and his friends went tree planting in an area that was frequented by a dangerous grizzly bear. For defeating the beast, Jack is dubbed a hero, and gets a little complimentary action. Guest star: Gary Farmer as George Twotrees, Troy Hurtubise as himself
| 7 | 7 | "Fatal Extraction" | Adrian Carter | Jeremy Diamond | June 19, 2004 |
Jack works as a dental assistant in the dramatic (-comedic) environment of a dental ER. Meanwhile, Leopold has a bad toothache but refuses to leave The Trench, opting instead for do-it-yourself surgery. Guest star: John O'Hurley as Dr. Renfield
| 8 | 8 | "Holyland" | Adrian Carter | Jeremy Diamond | June 26, 2004 |
Jack works as a ride attendant at a Bible theme-park for renowned theme-park creator Magnus the Maker. He toils amongst such attractions as the “Holy Roller Coaster,” “Ten Plagues Fun House,” and the “Christ Capades.” Guest star: Christopher Plummer as Magnus the Maker
| 9 | 9 | "Broke & Broker" | Denny Silverthorne | Jeremy Diamond | July 3, 2004 |
Jack works as a stockbroker in the world of high finance and helps his wheeler-dealer boss on her quest for the Next Big Thing. Guest star: Catherine O'Hara as Claudia Johnson
| 10 | 10 | "Skateballs of Steel" | Denny Silverthorne | Jeremy Diamond | July 10, 2004 |
Jack works as an assistant coach and enters the arena of professional sports, a world filled with scalpers, fanatical fans, jocks, and jock straps. Guest star: Jim Van Horne as Wally Weaver
| 11 | 11 | "Almost Wormless" | Adrian Carter | Jeremy Diamond | July 17, 2004 |
Jack works as a roadie for a three-day rock festival that aims to save wormstocks from extinction, and is tasked with securing an important beat for the show. Meanwhile, Bobby finally gets an opportunity to command the main stage. Guest stars: Barenaked Ladies, The Chemical Brothers and Jeff Tweedy
| 12 | 12 | "Fantasy Atoll" | Adrian Carter | Jeremy Diamond | July 24, 2004 |
Jack and Betty are both sent to work as video game testers for a life simulator. At the launch party, they have a drunken encounter. Meanwhile, Leopold goes on a date with a woman he met online (who turns out to be Jack's mother, Babs), Jack’s grandma, Max, meets with an old lover at a marijuana cafe, Bobby gets a recording contract, and Jack's sister, Spoons, tries to save the mammals of the sea.
| 13 | 13 | "American Wiener" | Denny Silverthorne | Jeremy Diamond | July 31, 2004 |
Jack works as a wienermobile driver and heads across the country to Wienerfest. Bobby and Leo join Jack on this rowdy road-trip, with many characters Jack has previously crossed in hot pursuit. Guest star: Don Knotts as Dirk Douglas

=== Season 2 (2005) ===
Season 2 premiered on July 23, 2005 and ended on October 15, 2005. The art style was slightly overhauled for this season featuring more rounder edges and realistic faces.

| No. overall | No. in season | Title | Directed by | Written by | Original release date |
|---|---|---|---|---|---|
| 14 | 1 | "The 2 Marketeers" | Adrian Carter | Jeremy Diamond | July 23, 2005 |
Jack works as an ad whiz, but is employed at the same agency where his mom works, which causes friction when his ideas are chosen over hers. Guest star: Tom Arnold as William Swillberger III
| 15 | 2 | "Lord of the 3-Ring Binder" | Denny Silverthorne | Jeremy Diamond | July 30, 2005 |
Jack works as a teacher's assistant and helps a former mentor bring a book to a publishing house. Meanwhile, Bobby joins a fraternity. Guest star: Scott Thompson as Doctor Professor Randalf
| 16 | 3 | "Iron Temp" | Adrian Carter | Jeremy Diamond | August 6, 2005 |
Jack is sent to Odd Jobs Japan as a game show contestant and drives his bosses crazy. Meanwhile, his competitor, Toshi, replaces him back at home and does everything exceptionally well, causing Betty to fall for him, as well as Jack’s friends and family. Guest star: Megan Follows as herself
| 17 | 4 | "Orgy: The Musical" | Denny Silverthorne | Jeremy Diamond | August 13, 2005 |
Jack works as a stagehand for an ex-pornographer who wants to expose the sex-video industry in his gritty play. When Jack is cast in the lead role, he is unsure if he can do the part. Meanwhile, Jack and Leopold attempt to catch Bobby looking at dirty pictures. Guest star: James Woods as Manny Kowalski
| 18 | 5 | "You Suck!" | Adrian Carter | Michael Goldbach, Jeremy Diamond & Tim Polley | August 20, 2005 |
Jack works as a personal assistant to a once famous washed-up self-help guru who helps people through deprecation therapy. While wildly successful at first, Jack begins to wonder if this method of helping people is doing more bad than good. Guest star: Tom Green as Terence McGavin
| 19 | 6 | "Jack Ryder Goes to War!" | Denny Silverthorne | Jeremy Diamond & Tim Polley | August 27, 2005 |
Jack works as a soldier and must endure the rigors of military life, being caught in a tailspin when Newfoundland threatens to separate from the rest of Canada. Guest star: Leslie Nielsen as Skitzkopf and Rick Mercer as Premier MacCurts
| 20 | 7 | "Odd Job John" | Adrian Carter | Jeremy Diamond | September 3, 2005 |
Over a weekend bong, Max tells Jack the story of his great great grandfather, who worked on the railroad. Guest star: Tony Rosato as Sheriff Ironsides
| 21 | 8 | "The Ten Labours of Jack Ryder" | Denny Silverthorne | Jeremy Diamond & Tim Polley | September 10, 2005 |
Jack works as a doula, dealing with pregnant women as well as their frazzled male counterparts. Worrying that the job is making him too feminine, he takes on a hyper-macho persona he calls “King Daddy Doula”. When the chief midwife is incapacitated, Jack is then forced to help with the delivery of the world’s first set of dectuplets.
| 22 | 9 | "Night of the Flesh-Eating Zombie Meter Maids" | Adrian Carter | Jeremy Diamond | September 17, 2005 |
Jack works as a meter maid, and a gypsy puts a curse on him, making him so good at his job that everyone in town hates him. Leopold, jealous of the attention Jack is getting, unleashes a hoard of zombies on the city in the hopes that it will make him public enemy #1.
| 23 | 10 | "A Christmas Coma" | Denny Silverthorne | Jeremy Diamond & Tim Polley | September 24, 2005 |
A toy puts Jack into a coma as he works as a Christmas gift-wrapper. In a sendup of A Christmas Carol, he is visited by the ghosts of jobs past, present, and future. Meanwhile, his family tries to profit off of his bruise when it begins to resemble the shape of Jesus.
| 24 | 11 | "The Biggest Bang" (Part 1) | Adrian Carter | Jeremy Diamond & Tim Polley | October 1, 2005 |
Jack works as a bellhop at a space-themed hotel for a sci-fi convention, meeting the girl of his dreams. Bobby sells his liver to get into the convention. Guest star: Will Arnett as Tiberius McKorkindale
| 25 | 12 | "Close Encounters of the Uncomfortable Kind" (Part 2) | Adrian Carter | Jeremy Diamond | October 8, 2005 |
Jack works as an astronaut after he and his friends are accidentally launched into space. After just about everything goes wrong, they are put in suspended animation and wake up 16 years later. Guest star: Will Arnett as Tiberius McKorkindale
| 26 | 13 | "Law & Lawlessness" | Denny Silverthorne | Jeremy Diamond | October 15, 2005 |
Jack works as a court reporter during the trial of a man who cuts off celebrities' pinky toes. Meanwhile, Bobby fights a jaywalking ticket. Guest star: Samantha Bee as Linda Callahan

=== Season 3 (2006) ===
Season 3 premiered on July 22, 2006 and ended on October 14, 2006. The changes to the show’s art style in this season were minimal.

| No. overall | No. in season | Title | Directed by | Written by | Original release date |
|---|---|---|---|---|---|
| 27 | 1 | "Twenty-One, You're Dead" | Adrian Carter | Jeremy Diamond | July 22, 2006 |
Jack works as a croupier and enters the lethal world of "Snuff Blackjack." Meanwhile, Bobby gets addicted to scratch and win cards. Guest star: Jason Alexander as Rod
| 28 | 2 | "Jack Ryder and the Fountain of Life" | Denny Silverthorne | Jeremy Diamond | July 29, 2006 |
Jack works as an archaeologist and teams up with his ex-girlfriend, Alberta Malone, to search for the Lost City of Wu, said to contain the Fountain of Life. Guest star: Molly Parker as Alberta Malone
| 29 | 3 | "The Temp, the Slut, the Queen, and Her Corgis" | Adrian Carter | Jeremy Diamond & Josh Greenhut | August 5, 2006 |
While working as a royal timekeeper in Buckingham Palace, Jack manages to take some inappropriate photos of the queen, which ultimately end up in the tabloids, leading to chaos throughout the realm. Guest star: Seán Cullen as Neville
| 30 | 4 | "Kindergarten Temp" | Denny Silverthorne | Jeremy Diamond & Tim Polley | August 12, 2006 |
While Jack is working as a substitute teacher for gifted kids, the children decide to stage an uprising.
| 31 | 5 | "Dragon Dueler" | Adrian Carter | Jeremy Diamond & Tim Polley | August 19, 2006 |
Jack works as a road-construction worker holding the stop/slow sign, but a combination of heat and tar fumes revs up his imagination. Meanwhile, Max loses her marijuana stash. Guest star: Harland Williams as Ralph
| 32 | 6 | "The Big Dump" | Denny Silverthorne | Jeremy Diamond & Tim Polley | August 26, 2006 |
Jack works as a garbage detective and enters a world of power, corruption, and white trash. Meanwhile, Spoons stages a stinky protest. Guest star: John Goodman as Billy Bob Jr. & Bobby Bill Jr.
| 33 | 7 | "29.5" | Adrian Carter | Jeremy Diamond & Tim Polley | September 2, 2006 |
In a take-off of 24, Jack is mistaken for a real secret agent trying to stop an outbreak of Mad Cow disease. Guest star: Christian Slater as Agent Brody
| 34 | 8 | "A Candidacy of Dunces" | Denny Silverthorne | Jeremy Diamond & Tim Polley | September 9, 2006 |
Jack works as a pollster for an elderly mayoral candidate to attract younger voters, but the candidate decides to "do his own thing." Guest star: Jerry Stiller as Jim McDonald
| 35 | 9 | "The Great White Joke" | Adrian Carter | Jeremy Diamond & Tim Polley | September 16, 2006 |
Jack is accidentally hired as a hip-hop clown in a Krumping group hoping to make the Dance Wars finals. Bobby and Leopold start up competing groups after a falling out with both Jack and each other.
| 36 | 10 | "The Man Who Smelled Too Much" | Denny Silverthorne | Jeremy Diamond & Tim Polley | September 23, 2006 |
Discovering his hidden talent, Jack works as a "Nose" for a perfumery and concocts some pretty unexpected scents. Meanwhile, Bobby has a potent case of BO. Guest star: Don Lake as Anton
| 37 | 11 | "Claws" | Adrian Carter | Jeremy Diamond & Tim Polley | September 30, 2006 |
Jack works as a crab fisherman with a crew seeking revenge on a giant crab. Meanwhile, Babs and Max go on an arctic cruise and meet a couple of young studs. Guest star: Seán Cullen as The Captain
| 38 | 12 | "Jack Ryder Gets Hitched" (Part 1) | Denny Silverthorne | Jeremy Diamond & Tim Polley | October 7, 2006 |
Jack becomes a social worker and falls in love with his boss as they help the less fortunate. Meanwhile, Bobby inadvertently turns gay after an accident involving a cash register. Guest star: Sandra Oh as Vanessa
| 39 | 13 | "My Big Miserable African Honeymoon" (Part 2) | Denny Silverthorne | Jeremy Diamond & Tim Polley | October 14, 2006 |
Jack's honeymoon turns into a disaster as he struggles to adjust to his surroundings and as he and his bride are taken hostage by refugees. Babs, Bobby, and Leopold head to Africa in search of Jack, while Betty makes a daring last ditch effort to save him. Guest star: Sandra Oh as Vanessa

=== Season 4 (2007) ===
Season 4 premiered on July 22, 2007 and ended on October 14, 2007. This is the final season of the series.

| No. overall | No. in season | Title | Directed by | Written by | Original release date |
|---|---|---|---|---|---|
| 40 | 1 | "No One Likes a Gorilla!" | Adrian Carter | Jeremy Diamond & Tim Polley | July 22, 2007 |
Jack is a corporate mascot, handing out fliers for a mattress store, dressed in a gorilla costume. Meanwhile, Max takes control of Leopold’s gadgets.
| 41 | 2 | "Jack Ryder: Mindhumper" | Adrian Carter | Jeremy Diamond & Tim Polley | July 29, 2007 |
Jack is a magician's assistant until the magician is taken away for sawing a lady in half and Jack gets to wear the top hat. Meanwhile, Bobby and Leopold switch minds using a gypsy’s talisman, and spend a day in each other’s shoes. Guest star: Seán Cullen as Astoundo
| 42 | 3 | "The Good Locksmith" | Denny Silverthorne | Jeremy Diamond & Tim Polley | August 5, 2007 |
Jack is a locksmith, learning the deft art of picking locks and remaining honest in a crooked biz. Meanwhile, Bobby and Leopold, after a heist movie marathon, assemble a team to perform the perfect heist.
| 43 | 4 | "Insecticidal Tendencies" | Adrian Carter | Jeremy Diamond & Tim Polley | August 12, 2007 |
Jack is an exterminator, initially reluctant due to his gentle nature, but quickly developing a talent and taste for the job. Meanwhile, Max wages war on solicitors after her smoking session is ruined. Guest star: Henry Rollins as Larry
| 44 | 5 | "Flight of the Bumbling Idiot" | Denny Silverthorne | Jeremy Diamond & Tim Polley | August 19, 2007 |
Jack works as a flight attendant, and does his best to fluff pillows, remain calm, and not crash the plane. Meanwhile, Max refuses to get her driver’s license renewed despite several repeated car accidents.
| 45 | 6 | "The Beauty Beast" | Adrian Carter | Jeremy Diamond & Tim Polley | August 26, 2007 |
Jack is a plastic surgeon, and acquires a taste for going under the knife and "improving" himself. Meanwhile, Bobby attempts to renovate Leopold’s trench, with help from Joel and Donna, hosts of “The Refurbishers”. Guest star: Carrie Fisher as Dr. Finch
| 46 | 7 | "Jack Ryder's Unofficial High School Reunion" | Denny Silverthorne | Jeremy Diamond & Tim Polley | September 2, 2007 |
Jack is a limo driver during prom season, and tries to keep his cool and act his age. Meanwhile, Bobby is hired to be a DJ at a prom for a school where his high school crush, Hailey Forsyth, works at. Guest star: Henry Winkler as Devin
| 47 | 8 | "12 Chickens" | Adrian Carter | Jeremy Diamond & Tim Polley | September 9, 2007 |
Jack is an egg farmer, but when a mistake involving a sick chicken inadvertently starts the apocalypse, his future self goes back in time and attempts to kill him. Guest star: Seán Cullen as Tolbert Daze
| 48 | 9 | "Master of Temps" | Denny Silverthorne | Jeremy Diamond & Tim Polley | September 16, 2007 |
Jack is a career counsellor at Odd Jobs and experiences life from the other side of the desk. Meanwhile, Bobby quits working at Big Fat Store, but has trouble finding a new job.
| 49 | 10 | "Revolving Jobs" | Adrian Carter | Jeremy Diamond | September 23, 2007 |
Jack gets his dream job as a spray-on tanner, but on the way to work gets trapped in a revolving door with a fellow sociologist.
| 50 | 11 | "You Almost Got Served" | Denny Silverthorne | Tim Polley | September 30, 2007 |
Jack is a process server and finds the one job where he has a zero success rate, but refuses to quit. Meanwhile, Bobby tries (and fails) to pick up girls after using advice from an instructional video. Guest star: Seán Cullen as Ed
| 51 | 12 | "King Whore" | Adrian Carter | Jeremy Diamond & Tim Polley | October 7, 2007 |
Jack is an escort and tries to show the ladies a good time while remaining on his pimp's good side. Meanwhile, Leopold makes his trench mobile and becomes a pimp to follow in his ancestors’ footsteps, while Max films a sci-fi movie. Guest star: David Cross as Julius J
| 52 | 13 | "Jack and the Magic Pencil" | Denny Silverthorne | Jeremy Diamond & Tim Polley | October 14, 2007 |
Jack works at an animation studio where his boss, Norm, has a magic pencil capable of bringing whatever is drawn with it to life. Jack secretly starts using it, leading to anarchy. Meanwhile, Bobby and Leopold become dysfunctional due to Jack working overtime and leaving a hole in their three-person dynamic. Guest stars: Kenny Hotz as Clay and Fred Willard as Norm
