= Dex Hamilton: Alien Entomologist =

Children's animated television series

- Genre: Science fiction Action; Comedy
- Created by: Matthew Fernandes
- Directed by: Jon Izen
- Voices of: Dwayne Hill; Melissa Altro; Lyon Smith; Stephanie Anne Mills; Carter Hayden
- Music by: Guy Gross
- Countries of origin: Canada; Australia
- Original language: English
- No. of seasons: 1
- No. of episodes: 26

Production
- Executive producers: Daniel Hawes; Suzanne Ryan; Regis Brown; Cherrie Bottger
- Producers: Daniel Hawes; Suzanne Ryan
- Running time: 30 minutes
- Production companies: March Entertainment; SLR Productions

Original release
- Network: Network Ten
- Release: 22 November 2008 – 16 May 2009
- Network: CBC Television
- Release: January 2010 – 2010

Dex Hamilton: Alien Entomologist is a children's animated television series, which is an international co-production between March Entertainment in Canada and SLR Productions in Australia.

== Plot ==
It is the year 3000. Dex Hamilton, a young entomologist and wildlife explorer is called into action when insect-like aliens crawling through the galaxy create a dangerous rift between man and nature. Accompanied by his team of scientists, Zap Monogan, Jenny 10 and Tung "the fantastic frog boy", Dex sets out to observe and capture these strange specimens.

Meanwhile, a villain is genetically modifying super bugs to destroy all worlds.

== Characters ==
- Dex Hamilton (voiced by Dwayne Hill) is an entomologist with a great love for insects. He runs The Habitat, where he and the others maintain a large variety of different habitats in which they can observe insects they've captured for study. He has a Broad Australian accent.
- Sally Keaner (voiced by Melissa Altro) is a wildlife explorer and reporter who occasionally allies with Dex and his team on different situations. She has a pursuit of beauty, and has a phobia towards some of the alien insects, notably the Devil Banshees. She has a Canadian accent.
- Zap Monogan (voiced by Lyon Smith) is a human/insect hybrid who was found by Dex a few months before the series. He has a very laid-back attitude which can sometimes get on the others' nerves, but becomes serious in dire situations. Zap is the strongest in the group and can grow insect wings at will. It is later revealed that Zap was originally created as a weapon by an evil scientist, who used his own DNA in the creation process.
- Jenny 10 (voiced by Stephanie Anne Mills) is a mechanic who maintains the insect's habitats and builds the weapons used by the team to capture bugs. She was created as part of the 'Jenny Project' along with nine other clones, who each possess a unique ability. Jenny 10 has enhanced intelligence and Jenny 8 can turn invisible.
- Tung Swampton (voiced by Carter Hayden) is a frog-like alien who tends to have disgusting hygiene habits and strange taste in food. He can jump long distances and scale walls with little effort, and also has a long tongue, hence the nickname. He sometimes gets in trouble for eating the insects captured on a mission.
- Syrrus (voiced by Dan Chameroy) is an alien bio-terrorist who was sealed in Planet Eltron for centuries. His goal is to assemble an army of deadly insectoid monsters so he can wipe out non-insectoid life from the galaxy to create a paradise for his army. He can transform into a swarm of insects and can control insectoid monsters with his own mind as well.

== Episodes ==
There are 26 episodes of 25 minutes duration each. Episodes are usually screened in a half-hour timeslot.

No.	Title	Directed by	Written by	Original release date
1	"Is This Part of the Tour?"	Jon Izen	Matthew Fernandes, Doug Sinclair & Ava Wheelright	22 November 2008
When his vehicle breaks down during a safari tour inside Hamilton's Habitat, Dex must lead a group of kids to safety while being pursued by a fire-breathing alien insect.
2	"The Real Deal"	Jon Izen	Matthew Fernandes & Ava Wheelright	23 November 2008
Dex guides a young woman named Sally through the wild jungle planet of Titan 64; The two must come to the rescue when a mythical insect kidnaps the parents of a young boy named Henry.
3	"The Dawn of Syrrus"	Jon Izen	Matthew Fernandes, Doug Sinclair & Dwayne Hill	29 November 2008
Stranded on a desert planet, Dex and the team accidentally free an ancient villain, Syrrus, who uses alien bugs to conquer worlds.
4	"Return of the Stryder"	Jon Izen	Matthew Fernandes & Ava Wheelright	30 November 2008
When a toxic alien insect infects Metro City's water supply, Dex and his team must find an antidote before the sickness can spread further.
5	"Family Business"	Jon Izen	Ryan Lussing & Doug Sinclair	6 December 2008
When a long-lost clone of Jenny 10 appears at the Habitat and joins Dex's team, Jenny becomes jealous of this overachieving charmer.
6	"A Blast from the Past"	Jon Izen	Matthew Fernandes, Jono Howard & Ava Wheelright	7 December 2008
Metro City is struck by a swarm of enormous dragonflies; Jenny 10 has knowledge of a porthole linked to the Carboniferous Period; chances of Dex and his team returning home safely are beginning to fade.
7	"Rebirth"	Jon Izen	Matthew Fernandes, Doug Sinclair & Ava Wheelright	13 December 2008
When a rebellious Zap develops dangerous super-powers and flees the Habitat, Dex and the team must retrieve him before he becomes a threat to himself and others.
8	"Youth is Wasted on the Tung"	Jon Izen	Scott Albet, Ryan Lussing & Ava Wheelright	14 December 2008
Zap and Tung are bitten by a Methuselah Beetle, causing their attitudes to radically change, and Dex has to watch them while searching for who's responsible for the beetle.
9	"Danger High Voltage"	Jon Izen	Ryan Lussing	20 December 2008
There's a new insect sanctuary in town threatening to rival the Hamilton's habitat, but Dex suspects some villainy emanating from it.
10	"There's No I in Team"	Jon Izen	Shawn Bishop & Ryan Lussing	21 December 2008
Tung tries to prove he isn't lazy like his friends accuse him to be, but in doing so has put himself in danger of the Giant Solar Mantis.
11	"Could This Be Love?"	Jon Izen	Matthew Fernandes & Doug Sinclair	27 December 2008
The gang find an endangered species threatened by the dangerous Timber Tribe. Can Jane Goodchild and Dex compromise to save the day?
12	"Hello... Is Anybody Out There?"	Jon Izen	Matthew Fernandes, Jono Howard & Ava Wheelright	7 February 2009
Dex gets shipwrecked from an electrical storm, and the only company is the mind-controlling Cranium Cricket who stowed away.
13	"Nature 3000"	Jon Izen	David Evans, Matthew Fernandes & Ava Wheelright	14 February 2009
A vicious arthropod has escaped captivity during a wildlife show taping, threatening Dex's reputation and his team.
14	"A Fish Tale"	Jon Izen	Matthew Fernandes, Doug Sinclair & Ava Wheelright	21 February 2009
A water planet that's been overfished has caused a horde of starving imperial water scorpions to attack a local village out of hunger. Can Dex find a compromise for both?
15	"The Rise of the Black Beetle"	Jon Izen	Matthew Fernandes, Brendan Luno & Dwayne Hill	28 February 2009
The gang pay a visit to Egypt complete with a friend of Dex, but while exploring some ruins, said friend accidentally unleashes a spell and becomes a monster.
16	"I've Got You in My Sites"	Jon Izen	Matthew Fernandes, Jono Howard & Ava Wheelright	7 March 2009
Dex is hire by a multibillionaire named Regis Stone to be a guide on a safari on planet Gigantor, but it is really a disguise for Regis to catch the local fauna.
17	"Black Widow"	Jon Izen	Matthew Fernandes, Mark Van de Ven & Ava Wheelright	12 March 2009
Zap associates himself with the spider-themed punk rocker Black Widow, causing him to ignore his duties.
18	"The Long Journey Home"	Jon Izen	Matthew Fernandes, Doug Sinclair & Ava Wheelright	12 March 2009
Tung takes the team to visit his homeworld Swamp Star-46, but when whip-tailed wasps threaten his village, he has to take charge of the populace.
19	"The Return of Winston Hamilton"	Jon Izen	Matthew Fernandes, Doug Sinclair & Ava Wheelright	28 March 2009
The team find a clue about Dex's father Winston Hamilton, and they go to extreme lengths to track him down.
20	"Oh Snap!"	Jon Izen	David Evans, Matthew Fernandes & Ava Wheelright	4 April 2009
A boy with strange powers named Snap joins the party, but it seems he's friends with Dex's rival Syrrus.
21	"Say It Ain't So"	Jon Izen	Matthew Fernandes, Doug Sinclair & Ava Wheelright	11 April 2009
Dex discovers his childhood hero laser ball champion Bobby Blitz is using Anabolic Tar Slugs to boost his performances, but it might get him killed.
22	"Seeds of Destruction"	Jon Izen	Matthew Fernandes, Brendan Luno & Ava Wheelright	18 April 2009
Giant alien flowers have suddenly grown on Earth, stealing water and blocking out the sun. Dex must find a way to remove them, but doing so isn't exactly safe.
23	"Dex and the Whale"	Jon Izen	Matthew Fernandes, Mark Van de Ven & Ava Wheelright	25 April 2009
Dex and the team find an entire world within the belly of a Whale Strider while engaged in a dogfight with the villain Syrrus.
24	"The Bog Squad"	Jon Izen	David Evans & Ryan Lussing	2 May 2009
When Tung infiltrates an evil amphibian gang of toad-men, he learns about their plot to invade the Habitat and kidnap one of Dex's prized insects.
25	"Star Flies with That?"	Jon Izen	Doug Sinclair	9 May 2009
When the team sets out to collect Star-Flies to power the Habitat's generator, they're taken hostage by a trio of eccentric space-pirates.
26	"Rumble in the Jungle" "Hidden Assets"	Jon Izen	Matthew Fernandes & Brendan Luno	16 May 2009
After a swarm of Syrrus' mutant bugs attack the team, Dex confronts him in his hidden lair and finally learns the truth behind his evil ways.

== Broadcast ==
The series first screened on Network Ten in 2008 and is designed for kids aged 6 and older.

It began airing on CBC Television in Canada in January 2010 and aired 10:30am EST on Saturday mornings, but had stopped by 2019 when the series was picked up by Toonavision.

Qubo aired the series in the United States until 27 December 2014.

== Film ==
Dex Hamilton: Fire and Ice, a full-length prequel film released in 2D and cel-shaded 3D computer animation, broadcast in December 2009 on CBC, before the series' premiere on CBC in 2010 (having already premiered on Network 10 in 2008).

A CGI movie Dex Hamilton and the Doomsday Swarm was released in 2012.

== Game ==
In 2010, March released Dex Hamilton's Bug Quest, a Flash-based online game featuring the show's characters. The game was hosted on the CBC's website as well as the show's official site.
