= Maple Shorts =

- Genre: Animated series
- Country of origin: Canada
- No. of seasons: 2
- No. of episodes: 26

Production
- Running time: 21 minutes
- Production companies: March Entertainment; CBC

Original release
- Network: CBC Television
- Release: April 6, 2005 – August 30, 2006

Maple Shorts is a children's television show produced by March Entertainment, producers of the TV show, Chilly Beach. Maple Shorts debuted in April 2005 and aired on the CBC Television.

Maple Shorts is hosted by a goose and a salmon. Canuckles is a cranky, conceited Canada goose who wanted to direct but settled for being a critic instead. Sela the salmon is Canuckles' bubble-headed, sweet-natured co-host. Together, they critique each short film which airs on the program.

Maple Shorts is the second broadcast television show produced by March Entertainment. Chilly Beach, the company's most popular show, started out as an Internet show using Flash animation.

March Entertainment, founded in 1996, also produces the Maple Shorts Canadian Animators' Flash Film Festival. The festival feeds higher-quality submissions onto the television show, and is used as a developmental vehicle for up-and-coming animators.

== Episodes ==
- Waiting for Schtumpenflugenburgermeyr (13 April 2005)
- The Legend of the Headless Usher (20 April 2005)
- Goose Encounters of the Third Kind (27 April 2005)
- What's Good for the Goose (4 May 2005)
