= Master Spy: The Robert Hanssen Story =

2002 TV movie about FBI agent selling secrets to the Soviet Union

Master Spy: The Robert Hanssen Story (2002) is a made-for-television movie based on the story of Robert Hanssen, who was charged with and convicted of selling American secrets to the Soviet Union. It was written by Norman Mailer and directed by Lawrence Schiller.

== Plot ==
The film depicts abuse perpetrated by Howard Hanssen, Robert Hanssen's father, against Robert. According to Hal Boedeker of the Orlando Sentinel, the events are intended to have viewers sympathize with Hanssen.

According to Boedeker, the film "lingers over his sexual peccadilloes".

== Cast ==
- William Hurt as Robert Hanssen
- Mary-Louise Parker as Bonnie Hanssen
- David Strathairn as Jack Hoschouer
- Ron Silver as Mike Fine
- Hilit Pace as Priscilla Galey
- Wayne Knight as Walter Ballou
- Peter Boyle as Howard Hanssen
- Alexandre Kalugin as Victor Cherkashin
- Lev Prygunov as Leonid Shebarshin
- Scott Gibson as Richard Timber
- Cara Pifko as Jane Hanssen
- Other members of the cast included Dmitri Chepovetsky, Lubomir Mykytiuk, Barry Flatman, Nola Auguston, Kate Trotter, Eugene Lipinski, Bruce Hunter, Colin Fox, Frank Moore, Terry Vnesa, Yvonee Gaudry, Craig Eldridge, Sarah Lafleur, Arnold Pinnock, Lawrence Schiller, Oleg Kalugin, Ned Vukovic, Jacqueline Pillon, and Neil Crone.

== Production ==
Master Spy: The Robert Hanssen Story was filmed in Moscow, Hong Kong, Hawaii, Toronto, and Washington, D.C.

The film was produced by Oakdale Productions and 20th Century Fox Television, and was distributed by Fox Television. The executive producers of the film were Norman Mailer and Lawrence Schiller, the producer was Kay Hoffman, the director was Lawrence Schiller, and the writer was Norman Mailer.

== Reception ==
Master Spy: The Robert Hanssen Story received reviews from publications including Variety, The A.V. Club, the Tampa Bay Times, DVD Talk, the San Francisco Chronicle, and Christopher Null of Filmcritic.com.

Phil Gallo, writing for Variety, wrote that the film was "A psychological drama that fails to haunt, intrigue or even repel its audience, “Master Spy” is a slowly told, drawn-out examination of an FBI agent who fights the demons of his upbringing, Catholicism and unbearable financial debt. Robert Hanssen's story of how he came to sell FBI documents to the KGB is more background than plot as scribe Norman Mailer and director Lawrence Schiller stick with the double spy's family life as the crux of this four-hour mini. William Hurt delivers a consistent performance as the droll, slightly base Hanssen and Mary-Louise Parker is excellent at living within the skin of his devoutly Catholic wife, Bonnie. Over four hours covering 33 years, we see little change in the Hanssens — their dedication to each other never wavers, they maintain traditional roles in the home and religion is their big fallback."

An article in the Tampa Bay Times noted that the film left out some elements of Hanssen's life.
