= Psi Cops =

- Genre: Adult animation Dark comedy Supernatural
- Created by: Bart Batchelor; Chris Nielsen
- Voices of: Bart Batchelor; Chris Nielsen; Tina Grant
- Theme music composer: Virginia Kilbertus
- Opening theme: "Psi Cops Theme"
- Ending theme: "Psi Cops Theme" (instrumental)
- Composer: Virginia Kilbertus
- Country of origin: Canada
- Original language: English
- No. of seasons: 1
- No. of episodes: 24

Production
- Executive producers: Bart Batchelor; Chris Nielsen; David Alpert; Chris Ferguson; Brian Kavanaugh-Jones; Catherine Winder; Robert Kirkman; Jonas Diamond
- Producers: Krista Kelloway; Sophie Caird
- Running time: 11 minutes
- Production companies: Corus Entertainment; Oddfellows Labs; Skybound Galactic; Wind Sun Sky Entertainment

Original release
- Network: Adult Swim
- Release: June 5 – August 28, 2023

Psi Cops (French: Psi Cops: Escouade Paranormale) is a Canadian adult animated television series that premiered on Adult Swim in Canada on June 5, 2023. The series was created by and stars Bart Batchelor and Chris Nielsen, who previously starred in Night Sweats and co-created the web series World Doctors and Daddy and the Big Boy for Mondo Media. It is produced by Wind Sun Sky Entertainment, Skybound Galactic and Oddfellows Labs in association with Corus Entertainment, with animation services provided by Smiley Guy Studios. Sony Pictures Television serves as the distributor of the series. It is the first original series made for Adult Swim in Canada, as all previous originals were made for either Teletoon at Night or Télétoon la nuit.

The series follows Kydd (Nielsen) and Felixx (Batchelor), the top detectives at the paranormal investigation agency Psi Cops, who solve supernatural mysteries despite their overall incompetence.

The series was later acquired by Adult Swim in the United States, which premiered one year later, on July 8, 2024.

== Cast ==
=== Main ===
- Chris Nielsen as Kydd, Felixx's best friend and one of the two field agents for Psi Cops.
- Bart Batchelor as Felixx, Kydd's best friend and one of the two field agents for Psi Cops.
- Tina Grant as Chief Beef, the founder and chief of Psi Cops.

=== Supporting ===
- Tiana Jung as Bitsie
- Dejan Loyola as Eric
- Brian Drummond as Stone Faceman
- Julie Lemieux as Shirls

=== Guest ===
- Jeff Shorkey as Dad
- Ronald Dario as Old Man
- Ryan Bell as Jakes
- Rryla McIntosh as Anna
- Dan Code as Lippy Boy
- Tabitha St. Germain as Sniper Spy
- Kathleen Barr as Head Official
- Liza Huget as Haggard Sailor Lady
- Christina Sicoli as Farmer
- Doron Bell as Bartender

== Episodes ==
No.	Title	Written by	Original release date	United States air date
1	"Alien Autopsy"	Bart Batchelor & Chris Nielsen	June 5, 2023	July 8, 2024
2	"Bloody Mary"	Bart Batchelor, Chris Nielsen & Christine Bortolin	June 5, 2023	July 15, 2024
3	"Breeder"	Bart Batchelor & Chris Nielsen	June 12, 2023	July 15, 2024
4	"Small Townies"	Bart Batchelor & Chris Nielsen	June 12, 2023	July 22, 2024
5	"Faith Healer"	Bart Batchelor & Chris Nielsen	June 19, 2023	July 22, 2024
6	"Mutant Snake"	Bart Batchelor & Chris Nielsen	June 19, 2023	July 29, 2024
7	"Shape Shifter"	Bart Batchelor & Chris Nielsen	June 26, 2023	July 29, 2024
8	"Chupacabra"	Bart Batchelor & Chris Nielsen	June 26, 2023	August 5, 2024
9	"The Facility"	Bart Batchelor & Chris Nielsen	July 3, 2023	July 8, 2024
10	"Kyddnapped"	Bart Batchelor & Chris Nielsen	July 3, 2023	August 5, 2024
11	"Crop Circles"	Bart Batchelor & Chris Nielsen	July 10, 2023	August 12, 2024
12	"Invisible Man"	Bart Batchelor, Chris Nielsen & Nima Gholamipour	July 10, 2023	August 12, 2024
13	"Paperwork"	Bart Batchelor & Chris Nielsen	July 17, 2023	August 19, 2024
14	"Old Witchy Hag"	Bart Batchelor & Chris Nielsen	July 17, 2023	August 19, 2024
15	"Monster Under the Bed"	Bart Batchelor & Chris Nielsen	July 24, 2023	August 26, 2024
16	"The Shadows of Death"	Bart Batchelor & Chris Nielsen	July 24, 2023	August 26, 2024
17	"Illuminaughty"	Bart Batchelor & Chris Nielsen	August 7, 2023	September 2, 2024
18	"Stake Out"	Bart Batchelor & Chris Nielsen	August 7, 2023	September 2, 2024
19	"The Djinn"	Bart Batchelor & Chris Nielsen	August 14, 2023	September 9, 2024
20	"Poppet"	Bart Batchelor & Chris Nielsen	August 14, 2023	September 9, 2024
21	"Murder House"	Bart Batchelor & Chris Nielsen	August 21, 2023	September 16, 2024
22	"Undead Soldier"	Bart Batchelor & Chris Nielsen	August 21, 2023	September 16, 2024
23	"The Cave - Part 1"	Bart Batchelor & Chris Nielsen	August 28, 2023	September 23, 2024
24	"The Cave - Part 2"	Bart Batchelor & Chris Nielsen	August 28, 2023	September 23, 2024

== Production ==
The series was first pitched after David Alpert, the CEO of Skybound Entertainment, discovered World Doctors and asked creators Bart Batchelor and Chris Nielsen for a "genre" version of the series. The duo pitched several ideas before hitting on the idea of "The X-Files Mulder and Scully, but replaced with two morons." Batchelor stated that it took six years from those initial pitches for the series to be officially greenlit by Corus Entertainment.

Scripts for the series were unusually long, with Batchelor stating that he and Nielsen could write as much as 45 pages for a single 11-minute episode, before trimming it down to around 26 or 27 pages. The series is animated by Smiley Guy Studios in Toronto, using a mix of Daz 3D, Adobe After Effects, and Adobe Animate to fully animate 3D models on a 2D plane that can be turned into full 3D for action scenes.

== Broadcast ==
Psi Cops premiered on Adult Swim in Canada on June 4, 2023, with two back-to-back episodes at 12:30 a.m. ET, and it was available on the Global app and the StackTV package on Amazon Prime Video. It also premiered on the Télétoon la nuit block on Télétoon under the title Psi Cops: Escouade Paranormale.

The series was first released in the United States on YouTube as part of the Throwback Toons channel (where it is no longer available) and later premiered on Cartoon Network's nighttime block Adult Swim on July 8, 2024. It was also released on the Sony Liv streaming service in India, and was later licensed to air on the Animation+ FAST Channel.
