= The Dating Guy =

Canadian adult animated sitcom (2009–2010)

- Season 1 DVD cover
- Genre: Animated sitcom
- Created by: Matt Hornburg; Mark Bishop
- Directed by: Joseph Sherman; Jamie Whitney
- Voices of: Fab Filippo; Anand Rajaram; Sean Francis; Lauren Ash
- Composer: Jono Grant
- Country of origin: Canada
- Original language: English
- No. of seasons: 2
- No. of episodes: 26

Production
- Executive producers: John Morayniss; Frank Saperstein; Mark J.W. Bishop; Matt Hornburg; Frank van Keeken
- Producers: Mark Satterthwaite; Mark J.W. Bishop; Matt Hornburg
- Running time: 22 minutes
- Production companies: marblemedia; Blueprint Entertainment (season 1); Entertainment One (season 2)

Original release
- Network: Teletoon Detour
- Release: September 17, 2009 – December 30, 2010

The Dating Guy is a Canadian adult animated sitcom that originally aired on Teletoon at Night from September 17, 2009, to December 30, 2010.

The show was created by Matt Hornburg and Mark Bishop, with executive producers being John Morayniss and Frank Saperstein. Produced by marblemedia and Blueprint Entertainment and, later, Entertainment One, the show also has a Gemini Award-winning tie-in website, with two web series: The Morning After Show, which discusses episodes of the main show, and Dr. Love, which features an in-depth look at dating; unlike the show, the web series are live action.

The show's premise revolves around the adventures of four Canadian twenty-something friends living in Downtown Toronto, looking for love in all the wrong places. Guests such as Russell Peters and Howie Mandel appear on the show.

== Development ==
The show's existence was first noted in 2006; at the time, C.O.R.E., who had most recently produced The Wild, was slated to provide animation services. By 2007, a different animation studio was being sought, with the show then-scheduled to premiere in late 2008. Smiley Guy Studios in Toronto was the animation service. and later in March 2009.

According to Frank Saperstein, the idea behind the show is based on the real-life dating experience of one of its creators. The influence of the founders of marblemedia, Matt Hornburg and Mark Bishop, on the show's premise has also been noted.

== Characters ==
The show focuses on four main characters who constitute a group of friends, Mark, VJ, Woody, and Sam, and a number of recurring characters.

=== Main characters ===
- Mark Dexler (Fab Filippo) – Mark is a 25-year-old single man who works as a copywriter at an ad agency. He shares an apartment with his best friends VJ and Woody.
- VJ Mendhi (Anand Rajaram) – Mark's Indian Canadian, virgin roommate. He works in IT at the same ad agency where Mark works. Despite sharing an apartment with his friends Mark and Woody, he does not pay rent. He is extremely perverted and has seen all the internet porn in the world. It is revealed in the episode 'Too Fast, Too Dexler', that VJ is short for Vagina.
- Woodrow "Woody" Jenkins (Sean Francis) – the womanizing, Black Canadian bartender of the Hotel Ego bar, and lives with Mark and VJ.
- Samantha "Sam" Goldman (Lauren Ash) – Mark's neighbor and friend, who is a concert promoter.

=== Recurring characters ===
- Anderson Anderson (Gabriel Hogan) – Sam's on-and-off-again boyfriend, from the US, who has multiple careers.
- Celia (Bryn McAuley) – a country Mormon who is new to the city and works at the Hotel Ego bar with Woody.
- Vince (Louis Ferreira) – a police officer who takes his job very seriously and his speech is vaguely similar to Al Pacino. He once dated Sam and remains a friend to her.
- Wang (Albert Chung) – the owner of A Taste of Wang the local Chinese restaurant, who is also a part-time drug dealer.
- Lily Wang - Mr. Wang's daughter and employee, who is VJ's love interest and a former girlfriend of Irwin.
- Vikram Cha Cha (Sugith Varughese) – VJ's veterinarian uncle.
- Irwin Chang – the leader of the Chinese mafia who is menacing, despite the fact that he rarely speaks and usually communicates through blowing smoke rings.
- Rudolph - Irwin's accomplice and translator.
- Jeff (Tony Daniels) – an Arab who works at a falafel restaurant. He was killed by cannabis in "Spanking the Monkey".
- Randy (Dwayne Hill) – a common thief who steals anything he can get his hands on. He was killed by being frozen by liquid nitrogen in "24ish", but returns in the next episode "Perfect 10 Killer".
- Brian Booyah (Howie Mandel) – The CEO of Johnson and Booyah (season 2).
- Denise Felcher (Kathleen Laskey) – Mark and VJ's sex addicted boss.
- Bryce (Noah Cappe) – Mark's coworker who acts like his boss.
- Ursula (Krystal Meadows) – A young coworker of Mark and VJ; whom the latter has a crush on.
- Zorro – VJ's perverted, pet raccoon.
- Cpt. Steiner (Aron Tager) – an elderly Nazi and Woody's best customer at Hotel Ego.

== Episodes ==
The show ran for two seasons of 13 episodes each.

=== Season 1 ===
No. overall	No. in season	Title	Original US air date
1	1	"Bonnie & Mark"	September 17, 2009
Mark hits it off with Bonnie just before she robs a bank, making him her accomplice. Sam meets the mysterious street illusionist Archangel who briefly impresses her with his mystical abilities.
2	2	"Beaver Fever"	September 24, 2009
Mark's new girlfriend Brie invites the gang to her parents' cottage for the weekend. Mark is hunted by Brie's father while V.J. and Woody attempt to get lucky with the ladies at an all-female retreat across the lake.
3	3	"Boner Donor"	October 1, 2009
Mark is promised the best sex of his life in exchange for a kidney to save his date's dying brother. What do you think he'll do?
4	4	"A Taste of Wang"	October 8, 2009
V.J. falls for Lily and becomes involved in illegal fish fighting to win her from her gangster boyfriend. To impress Jeanie, Mark lies about knowing a famous singer. Now he must convince Sam, a dead-ringer for the celebrity, to impersonate the badmouthed rocker.
5	5	"Statute of Limitations"	October 15, 2009
Mark is emasculated when an artists sculpts him with a reduced manhood. Elsewhere, Woody gets a tattoo. On his face. Who would do that?
6	6	"Yummy Dummy"	October 22, 2009
Mark hooks up with ventriloquist Shari, but takes a liking to her dummy Mallory.
7	7	"Really Bad Lieutenant"	October 29, 2009
A drunken Woody and V.J. are abandoned at a reenactment pioneer village. They think they have time-traveled. Mark and Sam date police officers Valerie and Vince, a crime fighting duo with reality issues.
8	8	"Captain Petard"	November 5, 2009
Mark meets a gold-digger. He steals a boat to impress her. Woody starts a pillow-fighting league.
9	9	"There's Something About Amelia"	November 12, 2009
VJ and Woody believe the son of Sam's new boyfriend is the Antichrist. Mark dates a were-wolf. Can he date her? What is her budget for hair products? Does she walk on two legs or four? So many questions!
10	10	"Cherry Sundae"	November 19, 2009
A porn star named Cherry Sundae takes a liking to Mark. Because that always happens in real life.
11	11	"Woodyplicity"	December 3, 2009
Woody pretends he has a twin brother in order to date twin sisters. VJ totals Mark's car.
12	12	"Wind Tunnel"	December 10, 2009
Local weathergirl Connie directly goes to work commando after sleeping during the previous night with Mark, flashes the broadcast viewers and loses her job. Mark, feeling responsible, takes action to get her job back, but is forced to accept the position himself. V.J. turns a golf-putting device into the next popular sex toy.
13	13	"He's Here and He's Queer"	December 17, 2009
VJ's family sends him a mail-order bride. Also, someone pops the question.

=== Season 2 ===
No. overall	No. in season	Title	Original US air date
14	1	"24ish"	October 7, 2010
Two Swedish flight attendants wait for Mark and Woody who think that if the guys can get to the airport in 30 minutes a zombie uprising will happen.
15	2	"Perfect 10 Killer"	October 14, 2010
Sam tracks a serial killer who is targeting perfect women. Mark buys his first pair of "man shoes" and falls in with a ring of international spies.
16	3	"Incredible Shrinking Woody"	October 21, 2010
A mad scientist shrinks Woody and Anderson for sinister purposes. Mark and Sam compete on a Japanese game show.
17	4	"AssPocalypse Now"	October 28, 2010
Sam goes to Brazil for a butt augmentation while V.J., on the run from Woody, gets an unexpected gut reduction. Mark follows Sam into the Brazilian jungle to retrieve the one-of-a-kind jeans he needs for work.
18	5	"Leprechaun Interrupted"	November 4, 2010
V.J. and Woody abduct a leprechaun, whose hot Irish daughter puts a hex on them; Sam tries to revive an ex-rocker's career by getting herself committed to a mental hospital.
19	6	"Gross Encounters of the Virgin Kind"	November 11, 2010
V.J. thinks he has had an alien encounter after a night of heavy partying. Sam coaxes her boyfriend to get cosmetic surgery.
20	7	"VJ and the Holy Boner"	November 18, 2010
V.J. embarks on a porn odyssey. Mark reconnects with an old flame.
21	8	"Spontaneous Skidmark"	November 25, 2010
Woody's new basketball-player flame becomes pregnant, forcing Woody to evaluate what type of father he will be. V.J.'s car has a volatile temper.
22	9	"Spanking the Monkey"	December 2, 2010
Sam becomes maternal toward her ex's monkey. Woody and V.J. raise a botanical monster.
23	10	"Brother From Another Tanning Booth"	December 9, 2010
In an experiment, Woody and Mark change their skin tones. A boy band may jeopardize Sam's career as a concert promoter.
24	11	"Too Fast Too Dexler"	December 16, 2010
Mark is dumped for being too safe. Woody lands them both in a gang war. V.J. and Sam glue themselves together an date conjoined twins.
25	12	"Weekend at Booyah's"	December 23, 2010
Mark must make his boss happy after the latter had a short-lived romance with Sam. Woody encounters a promiscuous woman from the afterlife. Guest star: Howie Mandel
26	13	"20,000 VJ's Under the Sea"	December 30, 2010
Mark takes a job working for Russell Peters, who takes the gang on an adventure in his submarine to find Atlantis. Guest star: Russell Peters, Howie Mandel

== Reception ==
A review of the show prior to its release on Teletoon praised it for its humour but criticized it for a perceived lack of polish. A review of the DVD rated it 2/5, praising the show's eccentricity and references to Canadian culture but criticizing its humour and storyline.

The Dating Guy has also been criticized for allegedly being a ripoff of the webcomic Least I Could Do, which was reportedly submitted to Teletoon to create an animated series. It did not come to fruition. Teletoon has reportedly denied the accusation.

=== Awards and nominations ===
The Dating Guy awards and nominations
Year	Association	Category	Nominee	Result	Ref.
2011	Gemini Awards	Best Cross-Platform Project - Fiction	DatingGuy.com	Won	
2011	Banff Rockie Award	Best Cross-Platform Project - Fiction	DatingGuy.com	Won	

== Home video releases ==
A DVD containing only Season 1 was released on April 26, 2011. The first season was also released for online viewing on the US version of Amazon Video until it was removed in 2025. The entire show is available from the Canadian iTunes Store. Seasons 1 and 2 were both available on the US version of Hulu until it was removed in the late 2010s.
