= The World Is Hot Enough =

Chilly Beach: The World Is Hot Enough
- DVD cover
- Directed by: Edin Ibric
- Written by: Daniel Hawes; Doug Sinclair
- Produced by: Daniel Hawes
- Starring: Steve Ashton and Todd Peterson
- Edited by: Kelly Carlson; André Plante
- Music by: Luc Arsenault
- Distributed by: March Entertainment
- Release date: February 5, 2008
- Running time: 72 minutes
- Country: Canada
- Language: English

Chilly Beach: The World Is Hot Enough is a Canadian animated comedy film based on the television series Chilly Beach and produced by March Entertainment. The title is a parody of the James Bond film The World Is Not Enough. An early version of the film had its premiere at Sudbury, Ontario's Cinéfest, and Boston, Massachusetts in 2005. It was released February 5, 2008 on DVD in Canada. A second film, The Canadian President was also later released.

== Plot ==
Dale wonders why no one ever visits Chilly Beach, and he realizes that it's due to the cold climate. Thus, Frank invents a super heater to warm Chilly Beach up. When the U.S. learns about it, they steal it and accidentally use it to destroy the planet. Frank and Dale must travel back through time to undo the damage.

In addition to the James Bond-like opening credits and theme song, the movie contains references to Back to the Future and The Terminator.

== Voice cast ==
- Steve Ashton as Dale McDonald
- Todd Peterson as Frank Shackleford
- Benedict Campbell as The Old Man
- Damon D'Oliveira as Constable Al
- James Colby as Gotham Cop 2
- Kathryn Erbe as FBI Agent Sara
- Kyle Thomas as Joker Thug 1
- Colombe Jacobsen-Derstine as Gotham Pd Detective Annie
- Patrick Renna as Armored Car Truck 1
- Chris Riggi as Jason Bourne Matt Damon looks alike
- Crista Flanagan as Emma Watson looks alike
- Jill Flint as FBI Agent Amy
- Campbell Scott as The President George W. Bush looks alike
- Sam Waterston as CSI Detective Mike
- Ike Barinholtz as The Terminator Arnold Schwarzenegger looks alike
- Landry Allbright as Harley Quinn looks alike
- Leah Lail as Gotham Cop 6
- Shaun Weiss as Gotham Cop 7
- Danny Tamberelli as The Joker looks alike
- Tom Hodges as Gotham Cop 8
- Tom McGowan as FBI Agent Jay
- Jeffrey Nordling as FBI Swat 1
- Scott Bryce as FBI Swat 2
- Frank Pando as FBI Swat 3
- Amanda Setton as Joker Thug 2
- Corena Chase as FBI Swat 5
- Haviland Morris as Rachel
- Philip Ettinger as Hal Jordan/Green Lantern
- Jay Bulger as FBI Swat 6
- Luke Cook as Gotham Cop 5
- Peter Francis James as Gotham Cop 6
- Susan Blommaert as M
- Tara Karsian as CIA Agent 1
- Valerie Mahaffey as FBI Agent Valerie
- C. Thomas Howell as US Navy Seal 1
- Ashlie Atkinson as Ashley
- Marisa Ryan as Gotham Cop 8
- Amy Morton as Gotham Cop 9
- David Shumbris as Gotham Cop 10
- Will Lyman as US Navy Seal 3
- Chris Noth as US Navy Seal 4
- Alex Mckenna as Blake Lively looks alike
- Bug Hall as Ben Affleck looks like
- Tom Guiry as Brad Pitt looks alike
- Zuzanna Szadkowski as Melissa McCarthy looks alike
- Molly Ringwald as Gotham NewsReporter 1
- Bernadette Peters as New York Broadway Musical Stage 1
- Samantha Espie as April June
- Mary Lawliss as Katherine Hilderbrand
- Julie Lemieux as Becky Sue
- Robert Smith as Jacques LaRock
