= Smiley Guy Studios =

Canadian television production company

- Founded: 1998
- Headquarters: 1179 King St W Ste 302, Toronto, ON M6K 3C5, Canada
- Website: smileyguystudios.com

Smiley Guy Studios is a Canadian television production company founded in 1998 by graduates of the Canadian Film Centre including Jeremy Diamond, Adrian Carter and Denny Silverthorne; Jonas Diamond joined in 1999. It is one of the most prominent creators of adult animation in Canada, with shows like Odd Job Jack, The Dating Guy, Sons of Butcher and Corner Gas Animated, unlike most studios which focus primarily on shows targeting children's or family demographics. Smiley Guy also produces family content.

Working with clients on a variety of animated television, film and new media projects such as Odd Job Jack and Hotbox for The Comedy Network, The Ascent of Man with the National Film Board of Canada, Pillars of Freedom for TVO, The Dating Guy, Skatoony, and Sons of Butcher for Teletoon, Steve Jobs Resurrected for Mondo Media, The World of Bruce McCall, The Curse of Clara: A Holiday Tale, Canada's Smartest Person, Turbo Dogs, and The Kids in the Hall: Death Comes to Town for CBC, "The Politics Episode" of One Day at a Time for Pop, Beethoven's Wig, Psi Cops, and Captain Canuck. It produced the animation for the UK adult animated series Warren United by Baby Cow Productions in 2014, as well as the proposed children's show What a Croc! with Whole Hog Creations in 2012.

Along with Vida Spark Productions, it was co-producer of Corner Gas Animated, a revival of the hit live action situation comedy Corner Gas. Its first episode, "Bone Dry", which aired on April 2, 2018, is currently the highest rated premier ever for The Comedy Network. The fourth and final season aired in 2021.

The studio has also pioneered an experimental form of described video, wherein rather than a neutral narrator, descriptions are provided by actors in-character.

== Filmography ==
=== Television ===
Series	Year	Notes	Network
Odd Job Jack	2003–2007	Animation, writing, visual development, storyboarding, design, sound design, music, interactive elements	CTV Comedy Channel
Sons of Butcher	2005–2007	Animation	The Detour on Teletoon
Turbo Dogs	2008–2011	Animation	Kids' CBC
Hotbox	2009–2010	Production, animation	CTV Comedy Channel
The Dating Guy	2009–2010	Animation	Teletoon Detour
The Kids in the Hall: Death Comes to Town	2010	Animation	CBC Television
Pillars of Freedom	2010–2012	Animation, writing, visual development, storyboarding, design, sound design, music, sound mix, interactive elements	TVOKids
Skatoony	2010–2013	Animation (North American version)	Teletoon/Télétoon
GeoFreakZ	2011–2012	Animation	Teletoon
Steve Jobs: Resurrection	2012	Animation	Mondo Media
Teleporting Fat Guy	2012–2015	Animation, Post-Production, Pre-Production	Shut Up! Cartoons
Deep Space 69	2012–2015	Animation (season 1–3)	Mondo Media
Captain Canuck	2013–2016		CBC Television
Warren United	2014	Animation, Interactive, Music, Post-Production, Pre-Production, Sound Design, Sound Mix	ITV4
Furry Force	2014–2015	animation, visual development, storyboarding, design, sound design, music, sound mix.	CollegeHumor
Überdude	2015	Animation, Interactive, Music, Post-Production, Pre-Production, Sound Design, Sound Mix	Shut Up! Cartoons
Chirp	2015–2016	Animation, Pre-Production	Kids' CBC
Bob! The Slob	2015	Animation, visual development, storyboarding, sound design, music, sound mix, interactive elements (pilot only)	Teletoon
Wussywat the Clumsy Cat	2015–2016	Animation	CBeebies
The Great Canadian Baking Show	2017–present	Post-Production	CBC Television
Hatchimals	2017–2018		YouTube
Corner Gas Animated	2018–2021	Animation	CTV Comedy Channel
One Day at a Time	2020	Animation, Pre-Production; "The Politics Episode"	Pop
Black-ish	2020	Animation, Pre-Production; "Election Specia"	ABC
The Fabulous Show with Fay and Fluffy	2022–2024	Animation	Family Jr.
Mary and Flo On the Go!	2022	Animation	YouTube
Jeremy and Jazzy	2022–2024	Animation	CBC Kids
HouseBroken	2022–2023	retake animation; season 2 only	Fox
Psi Cops	2023	Animation	Adult Swim
What the Stink	2023	Animation	YouTube
Playing with Stu	2024	Animation	CBC Kids

=== Feature films ===
Title	Release date	Co-production with	Note
Sk8 Life	2006	Travesty Productions	visual effects
Chemerical Redefining Clean for a New Generation	2009	Take Action Films	Animation
The Bang Bang Club	September 15, 2010		end titles
Hard Core Logo 2	December 4, 2010	Foundation Features	Animation
SOS: Save Our Skins	April 4, 2014	Farmhouse Productions; Duopoly; Baby Cow Productions	Pre-Production, visual development, storyboards, visual effects
Todd and the Book of Pure Evil: The End of the End	October 25, 2023	Aircraft Pictures; Corvid Pictures; Frantic Films Live Action Productions	Animation, Pre-Production

=== Specials/shorts ===
Feature	Year(s)	Client	Notes
See Paris Die!	2005	Outer Boroughs Entertainment	
Mr Happy	2005	Bravo!FACT; Waking Dream Productions	Layout, Animation
The Ascent of Man	2008	National Film Board of Canada	
A Christmas Carl	2008	Waking Dream Productions	Animation
Clear Conscience	2009	Duopoly	Animation
Beethoven's Wig	2011–2012; 2025		Animation
The World's Worst Golf Course	2011	Duopoly	Animation
Blame Cupid Stupid	2011	Bravo!FACT; Chuck Gammage Animation; Waking Dream Productions	Sound editor and sound mix
I (See) New York	2012		Animation
The Curse of Clara: A Holiday Tale	2015	CBC Television	Animation

== Notes ==
- AWN
- Smiley Guy Studios To Restruture [sic] iThentic
