= Odd Job Jack =

- Genre: Animated sitcom
- Created by: Adrian Carter; Denny Silverthorne Jr.; Jeremy Diamond
- Directed by: Adrian Carter; Denny Silverthorne Jr.
- Starring: Don McKellar; Teress Morton; Matthew Ferguson; Enoch Savage; Jeremy Diamond
- Theme music composer: Denny Silverthorne Jr.
- Composers: Denny Silverthorne Jr.; Roger Leavens
- Country of origin: Canada
- Original language: English
- No. of seasons: 4
- No. of episodes: 52 (list of episodes)

Production
- Executive producer: Jonas Diamond
- Producers: Adrian Carter; Denny Silverthorne Jr.; Jeremy Diamond
- Editor: Andrew Anderson
- Running time: 21–23 minutes
- Production company: Smiley Guy Studios

Original release
- Network: The Comedy Network
- Release: March 5, 2003 – October 14, 2007

Related
- Kevin Spencer; Chilly Beach

Odd Job Jack is a Canadian adult animated sitcom starring Don McKellar playing the main character of the series named Jack Ryder and his misadventures in temporary employment. Seen on and produced for The Comedy Network, a cable specialty channel, and once available on iTunes, Adult Swim and MuchMusic in Latin America, 2x2 in Russia, Hulu in the United States, and MusiquePlus in French-speaking Canada. A total of 52 episodes were produced over four seasons. Reruns also aired in winter 2013 on MTV2.

== Production ==
Odd Job Jack was created by Smiley Guy Studios in Toronto. The show was originally developed as a web-based cartoon and based on an early short the creators made called "The Seen", which released in 1997, but quickly moved to cable television distribution. The producers of the show pay homage to their web roots by maintaining a web site that contains unique interactive content to support each episode, largely consisting of Flash games. They advertised this connection as being a "sit.com". An advertising deal with Molson Canadian helped fund the move to television.

On July 14, 2006 in an email to subscribers, Smiley Guy Studios announced FreeJack, an initiative under which they have started releasing the master files of every character, prop, and background from every episode for the upcoming season under a non-commercial share-friendly license. However, in 2007, after the fourth season the show definitely ended production.

Every episode is structured by the opening theme, the full episode and the closing credits. The series featured an experimental form of described video, wherein rather than a neutral narrator, the actors would describe visual sequences in-character.

== Episodes ==
Season	Episodes	Originally released	
Season	Episodes	First released	Last released
1	13	March 5, 2003	July 31, 2004
2	13	July 23, 2005	October 15, 2005
3	13	July 22, 2006	October 14, 2006
4	13	July 22, 2007	October 14, 2007

== Plot ==
The eponymous character, Jack Ryder, graduates from university with a degree in sociology and becomes a temporary employee at an agency called Odd Jobs which specializes in filling difficult and unusual positions. Each episode ends with Jack adding a chapter to a book which he is writing about his experiences on his laptop.

When not working, Jack often hangs with his eccentric friends, Leopold "Leo" Trench, an agoraphobic computer hacker who, like one of the characters in McKellar's earlier comedy series, Twitch City, is unable to leave his apartment but nonetheless leads a complex and bizarre life, and Bobby Lee, an Asian kid who works in the family store by day, and is a club disc-jockey and masked hero by night.

Jack also spends some time at the beginning and end of each episode at the agency where he attempts to develop a rapport with Betty Styles, the female assignment "associate" while under electronic surveillance from the gruff, imperious, and decidedly unpleasant, manager/owner (Mr. Fister) who is often involved in some way in the bizarre conspiracies, sordid sexual escapades, and crimes which lurk behind the workaday appearances of Jack's assignments.

At the conclusion of season three, Betty, after stealing the company jet to rescue Jack from African kidnappers, is fired from Odd Jobs and runs away to a distant country. Jack is greeted in each season four episode with a new assignment associate, each with a personality defect. The first season also featured Jacques, a French Canadian doppelgänger to Jack who serves as an office nemesis.

== Cast ==
- Don McKellar as Jack Ryder, a 25 year old sociologist who works at Odd Jobs. In each episode, he has a new job, while trying to flirt with his career counsellor, Betty Styles, often being met with rejection. He can be seen in every episode writing a journal about his experiences as a temp.
- Teress Morton as Betty Styles, Jack's career counsellor in seasons 1-3. After being fired from Odd Jobs and running away at the end of the season 3 finale, she is replaced by a variety of new career counsellors in season 4.
- Matthew Ferguson as Bobby Lee, a naive boy and one of Jack's friends who works at Big Fat Store, a convenience store owned by his family. In season 1, he has a crime-fighting alter ego known as DJ Sherpa.
- Enoch Savage (episodes 1-6), Jeremy Diamond (episode 7-onward) as Leopold Trench, an agoraphobic computer hacker and one of Jack's friends, he is often seen in his home (known as The Trench).
- Rick Miller as Mr. Fister, Jack and Betty's boss and the manager of Odd Jobs, who oversees them from his office to intervene in their meetings about each episode's job. He is never shown from the front. He does not appear in season 3, but made one final appearance in season 4.
- Mairon Bennett as Spoons Ryder, Jack's sister. She is an activist who will jump at every opportunity to chew out her own brother.
- Julia Donovan as Barbara "Babs" Ryder, Jack's mother. She works as an executive at an advertising company. Her husband, Ron Ryder, either was captured for creating the cure for the common cold or left her behind when Jack was young, leaving her to raise both Jack and Spoons on her own.
- Maria Vacratsis as Maxine "Max" Ryder, Jack's grandmother. Old and retired, she often spends her spare time sitting on the couch, smoking marijuana.

=== Guests ===
The show features voice work by a number of often Canadian celebrities, especially after the first season: celebrities appear occasionally on the second season, and the third season has a special celebrity guest star for each episode, who either play themselves or voice one of the show's eccentric, if not mad, characters. Celebrities in the first season were Dave Foley, Troy Hurtubise, Gary Farmer, the Barenaked Ladies, Jeff Tweedy of Wilco, John O'Hurley, Megan Follows, Christopher Plummer, Rick Mercer, Kenny Hotz, Catherine O'Hara and Don Knotts. The second season sees Tom Arnold, Scott Thompson, James Woods, Tom Green, Leslie Nielsen, Will Arnett, Samantha Bee, and John Goodman accompany Jack on his adventures in the weird world of work.

== Reception ==
Odd Job Jack was nominated for the Gemini Awards in 2006 for best "Best Cross Platform Project" and the Canadian Comedy Awards in 2007 in the "Writing Series" category, while winning the CFTPA Indie Awards in 2008 for "Best Convergent New Media", and the Banff World Television Award for "Interactive Program Enhancements". The series achieved over three million views within its first year on Hulu. Writing for TheGATE.ca critic W. Andrew Powell wrote that ""Odd Job Jack" is also pretty damn funny. It's charm is that it's extremely funny, without half of the insanity or depravity of shows like "South Park". Sure, people get chopped up & eaten, dead people get up and dance, and famous people get made fun of, but it's surprisingly fresh without being utterly offensive." Andrew Ryan for The Globe and Mail noted of the season three premiere that "Odd Job Jack is still sharply written and crudely animated, which is part of its appeal. Be grateful some things remain resistant to change."

== See also ==
- Kevin Spencer
- Chilly Beach
