= Chilly Beach =

Canadian animated sitcom (2003–2006)

- Genre: Animated sitcom
- Created by: Daniel Hawes; Doug Sinclair
- Starring: Steve Ashton; Todd Peterson; Robert Smith; Samantha Espie; Mary Lawliss; Emily Tait; Damon D'Oliveira; Jacqueline Pillon
- Country of origin: Canada
- Original language: English
- No. of seasons: 3
- No. of episodes: 65 (list of episodes)

Production
- Executive producers: Daniel Hawes; Catherine Tait; Liliana Vogt
- Production company: March Entertainment

Original release
- Network: CBC
- Release: September 3, 2003 – May 3, 2008

Related
- Odd Job Jack

Chilly Beach is a Canadian adult animated sitcom that aired on CBC from 2003 to 2008. The series is a comedic depiction of life in the fictional Canadian town of Chilly Beach, described by the producers as "a bunch of Canadians doing the stuff that Canadians do, like playing hockey, drinking beer, and being eaten by polar bears." Chilly Beach plays on nearly every conceivable stereotype that people have about Canadians in a satirical manner. 65 episodes were produced over three seasons.

The first iterations of the concept began in 1998 as a cartoon demonstration for Daniel Hawe's firm Infopreneur, which also served as an animated web series. It was later developed into a CBC TV series which first aired in 2003. An early version of the Chilly Beach feature film, The World Is Hot Enough, made its theatrical debut at Cinéfest in September 2005, and was released to DVD on February 4, 2008. A second film, Chilly Beach: The Canadian President was also produced.

Guest stars in the series have included William Shatner, Joe Flaherty, Leslie Nielsen, Elvis Stojko, Lawrence Gowan, and David Suzuki. The show was produced in Sudbury, Ontario by March Entertainment. In 2011, the series launched in the United States on the streaming video website Hulu; the series had also been available on iTunes. A tie-in browser game was also produced called Beach Hunt.

== Characters ==
Main characters

- Dale MacDonald (voiced by Steve Ashton) is a stupid and fat stereotypical Canadian. He has a crush on April June, who detests Dale, and has a best friend, Frank Shackleford, whose genius would go more appreciated if Dale didn't accidentally destroy most of his brilliant inventions with a stray puck. He owns a Zamboni and considers ice resurfacing a skilled trade. Devoted fan of hockey, especially his favourite team the Montreal Tourtières, in direct opposition to Frank's support of the Toronto Ptarmigans.
- Frank Shackleford (voiced by Todd Peterson) is a beer store manager and Dale's best friend. Also a modest scientific genius; he once created a portal to another galaxy. He holds a PhD in physics, but chooses to run a beer store because "physicists don't get two-fours on weekends".
- Jacques LaRock (voiced by Robert Smith) is an unhygienic and somewhat incompetent greasy spoon owner and former hockey player from Quebec who serves a poutine made from a recipe passed down from his mother.
- April June (voiced by Samantha Espie) is a waitress and ferocious animal rights activist. Dale is constantly trying to get her to date him, but she resolutely remains uninterested.
- Angus MacAuger (voiced by Steve Ashton) is an eccentric and hermetic Scottish trapper
- Katherine Hilderbrand (voiced by Mary Lawliss) is the disgruntled (and highly patriotic) Assistant Deputy American Ambassador to Canada
- Abby Hilderbrand (voiced by Emily Tait) is Katherine's inquisitive and intelligent daughter. She is an aspiring anthropologist constantly trying to understand Canadian culture.
- Constable Al (voiced by Damon D'Oliveira) is an Indo-Canadian mountie, the only form of law enforcement in Chilly Beach usually found riding his police horse.
- Michel Mabuis (voiced by Jacqueline Pillon) is the nephew of Jacques LaRock, a friend of Abby who enjoys figure skating, a fact he has to hide from his hockey-obsessed uncle who considers figure skating weak.
- The Polar Bear (voiced by Robert Smith) a large animal who frequently eats citizens of Chilly Beach, somehow has with a pleasant British accent, and lives with a taciturn penguin

The characters Abby and Michel were deemed unpopular after season one, and largely disappeared from the series in subsequent seasons.

Minor characters

- Antoine DelVecchio (voiced by Joe Flaherty) is Chilly Beach's corrupt and incompetent Member of Parliament.
- Lucretia Marinara (voiced by Andrea Martin) is the local butcher and girlfriend of Jacques LaRock.
- Panic Man is a completely unnamed character who shows up regularly only to panic at whatever is happening and run off.
- The President (voiced by William Shatner) is an unnamed President of the United States. At one point he tells the President of Generistan to call him "Henry".
- Dave Macdonald is Dale's perfect and well-loved older brother who appears in only one episode. He is the total opposite of Dale. He came to Chilly Beach hoping Dale would give him a kidney in order to live. However is turns out their blood types are incompatible, so one of them was actually adopted. He got his new kidney thanks to Frank, who was tied up and gagged by Dale. Apparently, he's from Saskatoon.

== Setting ==
Chilly Beach is a small town located on a large iceberg, presumably in the Canadian Arctic. The iceberg is seemingly a floating island that can move around in the water. There are some trees and wildlife as well as a mountain with caves. According to at least one episode, the island is located in northwestern Hudson Bay, placing it in Nunavut. However where it is has been kept vague as it has been mentioned that they live in a province and in season 1, episode 15 are not actually a part of Canada.

== Home media ==
- Chilly Beach DVD Season 1
- Chilly Beach "The World Is Hot Enough" DVD

== See also ==
- Odd Job Jack
