= Appleby (surname) =

Appleby is an Old English surname, and combines Apple or Appel, indicating an apple, and the Danish suffix by meaning 'settlement', indicating someone who lived near an apple orchard, or someone who farmed apples. Notable people with the surname include:

- Anne Appleby (born 1954), American painter
- Austin Appleby (born 1993), American football quarterback
- Ben Appleby (1876–1961), English footballer
- Bob Appleby (footballer) (1940–2024), English football goalkeeper
- Charlie Appleby (born 1975), British racehorse trainer
- Flynn Appleby (born 1999), Australian rules footballer
- Frank Pierpoint Appleby (1913–2015), Canadian politician
- Fred Appleby (1879–1956), English long-distance runner
- Jim Appleby (1934–2014), English footballer
- Jo Appleby (born 1974), British singer
- John Appleby (1840–1917), American inventor
- John Appleby (? - 1975), British novelist
- Joyce Appleby (1929–2016), American historian
- Ken Appleby (born 1995), Canadian ice hockey player
- Kim Appleby (born 1961), British singer
- Louis Appleby, British psychiatrist
- Melanie Appleby (1966–1990), British singer; sister of Kim
- Percival Appleby (1894–1968), Canadian soldier
- Reginald Appleby (1865–1948), English lawyer
- Richard Franklin Appleby (born 1940), Australian Anglican bishop
- Ritchie Appleby (born 1975), English soccer player
- Robert Appleby (MP) (died 1407), English politician
- Robert Appleby (palaeontologist) (1922–2004), British palaeontologist
- Robert Appleby (coach) (1922–2006), American football and baseball player and coach
- Shiri Appleby (born 1978), American actress
- Stephen Appleby (1912–1984), British pilot
- Steven Appleby (born 1956), cartoonist, illustrator and artist living in Britain
- Stuart Appleby (born 1971), Australian golfer
- Susanna Appleby (1689–1769), English antiquarian
- Theodore Frank Appleby (1864–1924), American politician
- Thomas Appleby (MP) (died 1413), MP for Southampton
- Thomas Appleby (composer) (c. 1488–1563), English Renaissance composer and church musician
- Thomas Appleby (bishop) (died 1395), Bishop of Carlisle

Fictional characters:

- Appleby (Catch-22), a character in the novel Catch-22
- Sir Humphrey Appleby, a fictional character in the television series Yes, Minister
- Sir John Appleby, a fictional detective created by Michael Innes
