= John Appleby =

John Appleby may refer to:

- John Appleby (inventor) (1840–1917), American inventor of knotting device to bind grain bundles with twine
- John Appleby (author), 20th-century American author of pulp novels including Conquered City
- Sir John Appleby, detective created by Michael Innes in the 1930s who appeared in many novels and short stories
- John Appleby (economist), Chief economist, The Nuffield Trust

== See also ==
- Appleby (disambiguation)
