= The Captive City =

The Captive City may refer to:

- The Captive City (1952 film), a 1952 film noir directed by Robert Wise
- The Captive City (1962 film), a 1962 Italian English-language war film directed by Joseph Anthony
- The Captive City, a novel by John Appleby
