= Robert Appleby =

Robert or Bob Appleby may refer to:

- Robert Appleby (MP) (died 1407), for Lincoln
- Robert Appleby (palaeontologist) (1922–2004), British palaeontologist
- Robert Appleby (coach) (1922–2006), American football and baseball player and coach
- Robert Kazinsky (Robert John Appleby, born 1983), English actor and model
- Bob Appleby (footballer) (1940–2024), English football goalkeeper

== See also ==
- Robert Appleby Bartram (disambiguation)
- Charlie Appleby (speedway rider) (Robert Charles Appleby, 1913–1946), Canadian motorcycle speedway rider
