= Appleby =

Appleby may refer to:

== People ==
- Appleby (surname)

== Places ==
=== Australasia ===
- Appleby, New Zealand, a village near Nelson

=== England ===
- Appleby, Lincolnshire, a village in Lincolnshire
- Appleby-in-Westmorland, a town in Cumbria
  - Appleby (UK Parliament constituency), a former Parliamentary borough including Appleby-in-Westmorland
- Appleby Magna, a village and parish in Leicestershire
  - Appleby Parva, a village in the parish of Appleby Magna
- Appleby Lodge, a set of eight 1930s blocks of flats in Rusholme, Manchester

=== North America ===
- Appleby, Codington County, South Dakota, an unincorporated town in the United States
- Appleby, Ontario, a community in Burlington, Ontario, Canada
- Appleby, Texas, a city in the United States
- Appleby Corner, Ontario
- Appleby GO Station, a train and bus station in Ontario, Canada

== Organisations and companies ==
- Appleby (law firm), formerly known as Appleby Spurling Hunter, an offshore legal services provider featured in the Paradise Papers investigation
- Appleby College, an independent day/boarding school in Oakville, Ontario, Canada

== Other uses ==
- Appleby railway station (disambiguation)
- Appleby Horse Fair, an annual gathering of Gypsies and Travellers in Appleby-in-Westmorland
- USS Appleby, a fictional United States Navy destroyer that is the setting for the television series Ensign O'Toole

== See also ==
- Applebee's, large U.S. restaurant chain
