= Bromwell High =

Canadian-British television series

- The main cast of Bromwell High. From left to right: Latrina, Keisha and Natella.
- Created by: Anil Gupta; Richard Osman; Richard Pinto; Sharat Sardana
- Directed by: Pete Bishop
- Starring: Jo Wyatt; Nina Conti; Gina Yashere; Simon Greenall; Graeme Garden; Doon Mackichan; Stephen Mangan; Stephen Merchant; Tracy-Ann Oberman
- Composers: Andy Britton; David Goldsmith
- Countries of origin: United Kingdom; Canada
- No. of seasons: 1
- No. of episodes: 13

Production
- Executive producers: Jimmy Mulville; Cheryl Taylor; Mario Stylianides; Steven DNure; Neil Court
- Producers: Beth Stevenson; Anil Gupta
- Running time: 22 minutes approx.
- Production companies: Hat Trick Productions; Decode Entertainment (Note: As Decode/Bromwell High Productions Inc.)

Original release
- Network: Channel 4 (United Kingdom); The Detour On Teletoon (Canada)
- Release: February 1, 2005 – September 22, 2006

Bromwell High is an adult animated series about a British high school in South London. It first aired on Teletoon in Canada and Channel 4 in the United Kingdom (incomplete run). It is a co-production between Hat Trick Productions in the UK and Decode Entertainment (currently WildBrain) in Canada. It was originally to be entitled Streatham Hill, but was renamed Bromwell High in January 2005. Streatham Hill is a real London suburb, while Bromwell is fictional.

Subsequent international purchases have seen the show screened in the United States on BBC America, on The Box in the Netherlands, dubbed to Spanish and Portuguese on Cartoon Network's Adult Swim in Latin America, on the ABC in Australia, on TVNZ's TV2 in New Zealand, and also dubbed in Quebecois French for the Canadian Télétoon network.

It focuses on three diverse troublemaking teen girls: Keisha, Latrina, and Natella, as they wreak havoc on their impoverished school and its teachers.

The show was designed by David Whittle, who is also responsible for illustrating the popjustice icons series of books.

The show represents a caricatured view of contemporary British society, while "delivering a surreal and outlandish viewing experience." For example, the majority of students at Bromwell High School are immigrant children from the Caribbean and Asia, and some of the male teachers are aging 'chavs'. Many of the characters on the show speak a very poor form of English, including the headmaster, Iqbal. Most of the teachers have an affinity for biscuits (sweets).

Due to the show was intended for both British and Canadian audiences, the characters sometimes use Canadian terms which are different from those heard in Britain. This can sometimes confuse viewers, especially on the occasions when Bromwell is referred to as a "public school"; in Canada, this means a provincial school, open to non-fee paying students, but in the UK, the term refers to a fee-paying, private school which attends the Headmasters' and Headmistresses' Conference. In fact, Bromwell would be correctly termed as a state school in Britain.

There are some other differences between the UK and Canadian versions of the show, notably that the UK version has a longer and slightly different version of the opening credits and theme, and the UK broadcasts were in the 16:9 (widescreen) aspect ratio, while the Canadian versions are cropped to a 4:3 picture.

The show is directed by Pete Bishop (who also directed and co-created with Steven Appleby and Frank Cottrell-Boyce the Captain Star TV series) and was created by Anil Gupta, Richard Osman, Richard Pinto, and Sharat Sardana (with Osman, Pinto and Sardana also contributing as writers to the show).

== Characters ==
=== Main characters ===
- Keisha Marie Christie is a African British teen with a strong voice, a big personality, and the tendency to shoot first and ask irrelevant questions later. She has attention deficit disorder and likes anti-establishment activity and physical violence, often assaulting people with little or no justification. She comes from a broken home and blames society for treating her badly because she is black. She is voiced by Gina Yashere, of whom she is a caricature.
- Latrina is a poor, supposedly attractive chav White British girl who is quite dimwitted but doesn't worry about grades. She is promiscuous and unsophisticated, but she acts with good intentions. She dismisses many things, such as "tolerance", "wheelchair access", and "not having babies", as "for gays". She is voiced by Nina Conti.
- Natella Tendulkar Gavaskar Srivastavah is the youngest child, and only girl, in a family of 12. She is an errant Asian British prodigy who uses her stunning intellect to manipulate pupils and staff alike. She is extremely articulate, ambitious, and somewhat arrogant (often rightfully so). She often tries to overcome depressing situations through reasoning, yet passionately abandons this when she realizes that the situation is either worse or better than originally thought. In any normal school Natella would be top of the class, but at Bromwell High — happy home of the underachiever — her cerebral prowess is considered nothing short of astonishing. She is voiced by Jo Wyatt.

=== Supporting characters ===
- Iqbal bin Ibrahim Maurice Kandallah

Five years before his appointment at Bromwell High, Iqbal had escaped from Parkhurst where he was serving time for an unspecified crime. He subsequently met Mr. Bibby in Angola where they operated a diamond smuggling business together and "dabbled" in human trafficking. After being forced to leave Africa in a U.N. helicopter gunship, Iqbal arrived in England with nothing but the shirt on his back, a faded five pound note in his pocket, and a Bedford van's exhaust chamber full of state-of-the-art hydroponic equipment and marijuana seeds with the potential street value, when cultivated, of £80,000 (equal to £81,000 today). With these simple tools, he ran a mini-cab company and built an empire that today covers many thousand square feet.

Although he had no formal academic qualifications (he does not believe in science, which he calls "hocus-pocus"), Iqbal rose quickly through the ranks to become Headmaster on the night he won Bromwell High in a poker game.

Since he began his tenure, Bromwell High has consistently succeeded in avoiding closure — testament, surely to the quality of leadership he had provided.

Gregarious and larger than life, Iqbal is not a conventional Headmaster by any stretch. His language is colourful though his understanding of basic grammar is non-existent. He tries to make money any way he can, which often involves illegal and unethical practices. He holds very long meetings and assemblies that are often filled with irrelevant and/or ridiculous anecdotes or performances (known unofficially as "Item 53", due to the fact that in each episode the bizarre story/act is promptly followed by Iqbal saying "Next on our list, item 54..."). He can be manipulative and cocky but beneath the rough exterior lurks a conscience, and occasionally Iqbal surprises everyone with (rare) moments of humanity and pastoral excellence.

Iqbal's Bromwell High file number is 1. He is voiced by Simon Greenall (of I'm Alan Partridge fame).

- Roger Bibby

Roger Bibby read geography at Oxford University, where he won a Greco-Roman wrestling scholarship and had to pick an "academic" subject to graduate in.

In his first year, Mr. Bibby came under the spell of an emeritus professor whose study he accidentally wandered into one night thinking it was his own bed. It turned out that it was his own bed and that the "professor" was quite seriously mental. That night, a friendship began that eventually resulted in Mr. Bibby becoming a geography teacher.

Mr. Bibby is the Deputy Head of Bromwell High and the Geography teacher. Extremely articulate and knowledgeable, he has a very professional bearing. However, he is very stern and insensitive, and sometimes evil just for the sake of being evil (he has been known to be friendly with demons, and with Iqbal has links with the slave trade and diamond smuggling in Angola). In one episode he slapped Iqbal in the face just for crying. He is extremely manipulative, and therefore able to commit unethical acts with the Headmaster's consent.

Like the Headmaster, he is insatiably greedy and tries to make money through unethical practices. However, unlike the Headmaster, he is far more calculated when he implements his plans.

Mr. Bibby's Bromwell High file number is 159. He is voiced by Graeme Garden (of The Goodies fame).

- Martin Jackson

Martin read mathematics at Cambridge though he never graduated. He was physically and sexually abused by his tutor, the head of the mathematics department, the rest of the mathematics department, the rowing club, the varsity football and rugby teams and the Christian society.

He spent three years as a research project for the School of Medicine—his blood pressure was found to be high enough to clean car wheels. He did not die, he only whined continuously. Research on Martin led to the development of Prozac.

Despite the fact that he was, and still is, the only mathematics teacher in the school, it took Martin five years to gain promotion to Head of Mathematics Department. His teaching has been described by Ofsted as 'cocking shite'.

Martin is portrayed as an ineffectual teacher. He is in his late thirties, middle-class and lives in a Victorian terraced house near a council estate in southeast London.

When he teaches he does not discipline his students when they act contemptuously. He is also extremely neurotic, and panics at the thought of anything going wrong for him. He does not have a proper teaching qualification; only a certificate in plumbing technology. He often cheats on his wife, Carol Jackson, although he claims that "using a prostitute is not cheating."

When Martin messes up or does something wrong he often hits himself on the head and says "fuck" even when students are present.

Iqbal's nickname for him is "Mongo" (a variant of "mong", an offensive term implying mental retardation, derived from the original name given to Down's syndrome).

He was born Martin Shitely but took his wife's surname after marriage.

Martin's Bromwell High file number is 657. He is also voiced by Simon Greenall.

- Carol Jackson

Carol graduated from Hedgehog College, University of the Lake District, then attended teacher-training college at the Above Burger King School of Teaching, Oxford Street, London.

She then spent five years at the Amnesty International London office, waiting outside the main entrance. Nobody let her in but she did receive free psychiatric help and eventually accepted that she didn't work for Amnesty International and was in fact a nut.

She later met and married Martin Shitely, who took her name.

Carol is now an English teacher at Bromwell. She is in her 30s, wears organic clothes, and reads the Guardian. Carol understands people of all races and creeds except her husband Martin. She is discontented with the lack of intimacy and romance in her marriage; this is probably why she competes with Melanie Dickson for the attention of handsome men. She usually responds to Martin doing something stupid or wrong with "Oh, Martin, you idiot."

Carol's Bromwell High file number is 287. She is voiced by Doon Mackichan (from Smack the Pony).

- Melanie Dickson

Miss Dickson graduated from the University of Pudwacker Salt Flats with a First Class Honours degree in Chemical Biology.

She immediately gained bar work in London and very quickly rose up the ranks to become Bar Manager of "Alcoholiday", an Aboriginal-themed bar in London's Leicester Square.

She moved to Bromwell High thinking it was another themed bar, but within a year she realised that she was Head of Sciences at an inner-city school.

She is an attractive but very rude woman who shows a lack of proper teaching skills. She often taunts and teases people who aren't as pretty as she is, especially Carol.

Originally from Australia, Miss Dickson now teaches all the subjects at Bromwell that nobody else will (History/Science/Music/Etc.) - very poorly. She seldom cares about the subjects she teaches and even chain smokes during class. She competes with Carol Jackson for the affections of handsome men, mainly because she has an insatiable libido.

Melanie's Bromwell High file number is 349. She is voiced by Tracy-Ann Oberman.

- Mr. Phillips

Mr. Phillips grew up in the quiet, crack-addled village of Chomping Frenum on England's west coast. He went missing at age 10, after chasing a worm into the forest. He strayed into an army firing range and was hit by three medium-sized surface-to-air missiles. Fortunately they passed straight through his skull, but he lost 80 percent of his brain matter.

On his way to an interview for a post at Bromwell High, Mr. Philips was caught in the crossfire of a gang-war shoot-out and lost 80 percent of his remaining brain matter.

Mr. Philips is Bromwell High's Physical Education teacher. He is often unaware of his surroundings or current situation, and is therefore utterly ineffective as a teacher. Iqbal refers to him as "the stupid one".

Mr. Phillips' Bromwell High file number is 999. He is voiced by Stephen Merchant.

- Gavin Beale

Gavin was born in a crossfire hurricane. His mother was a tailor and his father was a gambling man. These circumstances made him turn to Christianity, which he hoped would provide some stability in his life.

He studied Theology at Durham University where he obtained a trombone scholarship.

He was ready to enter the church by 1990, in a poor east London parish where he felt he could help ease the suffering and assist the poverty stricken. He decided to defer a year and backpack around Thailand instead.

He claims to have written the novel "The Beach", the manuscript of which he says he left in a Bangkok dance bar, possibly in a Bangkok dancer. No one believes him because he has absolutely no proof and is generally considered to be "a lying twat".

Returning to the poverty-stricken East End parish, he was struck by how disgusting it was so he got a job teaching.

Gavin is now the Religious Education teacher at Bromwell High (he considered being a journalist for NME but became a Christian Fundamentalist without having to change his taste in acoustic-based rock). He acts casual in an effort to connect with his pupils, but this is a thinly veiled attempt to convert his students to Christianity. He consistently offends followers of all other faiths.

Gavin's Bromwell High file number is 742. He is voiced by Stephen Mangan.

- Ms. Jenny Gosby

Ms. Gosby graduated from Oxford Mobile University in 1986. There are no records of her before this. There are, however, records for a Mr. Bruce Gosby, who seems to have vanished during his gap year before attending university.

Bruce was an accomplished rower who took first place in both coxless events. He enjoyed being coxless, as if he were waiting all his life to be without cox.

After teacher training, "Ms." Gosby taught sciences to inmates of Lezzborough Prison, Little Beanflick, Dykeshire. She was dismissed after her involvement in a rooftop protest.

Convicted of inciting a riot, Ms. Gosby was tagged by the police and considered dangerous and psychologically unstable.

She has since been appointed to Head of Biology at Bromwell High, and is also the lunchlady.

Other characters have hinted that she might be transgender.

Ms. Gosby's Bromwell High file number is 123. She is also voiced by Tracy-Ann Oberman.

=== Minor characters ===
- Davis

Considered "cool" and attractive by many of the girls within Bromwell High. Although he is depicted as being intelligent, he is usually rebellious within school and rude to teachers and prefects alike. During the episode "1x06: Valentines's Day", the girls of Bromwell High witnessed him placing a valentine's card into Keisha's and Natella's box. It remains the episode's plot to see who the card is meant for. Although Davis and Aisha have many similarities, Davis has never mentioned that he likes Aisha. His "cool" status comes from his contempt for teachers and his skills in speaking. He is also apparently quite attractive.

- Jamal

Davis' best friend, although he is considerably less popular with the girls of Bromwell High. He is also considerably less intelligent, but less rebellious in school. Latrina has mentioned that she made out with Jamal.

- T'Shawn

T'Shawn is incredibly short and has a high-pitched voice. He is also depicted constantly wearing an orange jacket, regardless of location, weather, and temperature. These three qualities make him horribly unpopular with the children of Bromwell High. It has been established he has feelings of affection for Keisha, although she strongly dislikes him. T'Shawn's catchphrase is, "Oh, baby!"

- Aisha

Similar to Jamal and Davis, Aisha and Belisha are best friends. Aisha is large, strong, and constantly has an angry expression, so is feared by many Bromwell High students. Most of her bullying comes from intimidation, and not actual physical violence. Aisha strongly dislikes Natella and all of her noble causes.

- Belisha

Belisha is loud and brash. Unlike her best friend Aisha, she does not bully students exclusively through intimidation. She is quite willing (even happy, it seems) to physically harm students and damage property. Although she is relatively slim and only slightly tall, she is feared by all the girls, for she is very violent, and more than willing to fight (it can only be assumed that she is quite experienced in a fight, to make up for her small figure). She sometimes tries to outwit Miss Dickson into dismissing school early.

- Kylie

Kylie is a shy, ugly girl with bright red hair and bad acne. She is viewed as unpopular with the students of Bromwell and is picked on by Keisha, Aisha, Belisha, and many of the teachers. She is also voiced by Jo Wyatt.

- Leonora

A representative of the LEA (Iqbal believes this to be a secret organization, and her name to be Pussy Aplenty). She is rather cruel and manipulative individual, using the school, pupils and staff for her own and the LEA's rather shadowy ends.

== Episodes ==
No. in season	Title	Original release date	UK air date
1	"Tolerance"	1 February 2005	9 October 2006 (DVD)
Our trio prepares a presentation on the theme of tolerance, a subject which highlights the multi-cultural diversity within Bromwell High. Keisha and Natella become archrivals in a bid to win a prize which may or may not exist.
2	"Police Story"	8 February 2005	9 October 2006 (DVD)
When a prevalent mobile phone thief continues to evade the local police, Inspector Lehman visits Bromwell High to advise maverick Headmaster Iqbal that he will leave PC Carter at the school to catch the thief; he threatens that they'll clamp down on Iqbal's illegal animal trade if he doesn't comply with the police.
3	"Keisha's In Love"	15 February 2005	16 September 2005
Bromwell High has a new pupil: blue-eyed, golden-haired Spencer. Keisha experiences warm tingles every time she sees him, and responds by punching him. Meanwhile, the Head of Year 8 position becomes vacant and Miss Dickson ("the slutty one") and Mr Philips ("the stupid one") set out to impress Iqbal with their teaching prowess...
4	"No More Teachers"	22 February 2005	23 September 2005
After a sensational performance at the school music evening, English teacher Mr. Anderson is offered a pop star career, leaving the other teachers to ponder their own careers, grow depressed, and dream of pastures new. As they resign and set out on their own personal routes to fame and fortune, Iqbal must replace the entire staff.
5	"Fire Drill"	1 March 2005	9 October 2006 (DVD)
Keisha's fascination with pyromania has spiralled out of control until she can't stop herself from setting fire to the school premises. This becomes Iqbal's problem when one of Keisha's fires reveals that Bromwell High has no wheelchair access.
6	"Valentine's Day"	8 March 2005	9 October 2006 (DVD)
Natella tries to persuade her friends that Valentine's Day is only a "meaningless marketing event created by greeting-card companies to boost sales figures." At school, Miss Dickson decides to banish anyone who doesn't receive any cards to "ugly class", a threat that quashes Natella's high-minded ideas. Then they spot Davis, the coolest boy in school, putting a card in Keisha and Natella's shared box. Which laydee is the lucky recipient?
7	"Goodbye Mr. Crisps"	15 March 2005	9 October 2006 (DVD)
Iqbal and Mr Bibby need to raise money quickly to solve Bromwell High's latest financial crisis, so when Natella introduces Iqbal to her new friend, posh Katie, whom she met at the National Science Competition, Iqbal is ecstatic and amazed to learn just how much some children's parents are willing to pay for a decent education.
8	"Baby Boom"	1 February 2005	19 August 2005
Latrina's mum has just given birth to yet another baby, which Latrina accidentally brings to school in her bag. She swaps the infant with the sex education teacher's doll...will the teacher notice?
9	"Sack Race"	1 February 2005	9 September 2005
When P.E. teacher Mr Philips gives Latrina a grubby old vest that she believes belonged to Bromwell High's famous sporting alumnus Leroy Thomas, she immediately displays an astonishing athletic prowess.
10	"Prefect"	5 April 2005	26 August 2005
It's finally time for Iqbal and Mr Bibby to take drastic measures against Keisha's behavioural problems. To Natella's extreme anguish, they appoint Keisha as a school prefect. Keisha's mission is to reduce crime levels in the school, which she manages through a carefully orchestrated campaign of violence.
11	"Natella Takes Charge"	12 April 2005	9 October 2006 (DVD)
When the girls innocently play with a bomb that has been left in the playground, it unsurprisingly ends with chaos and destruction. To fund the necessary renovations, Iqbal and Mr Bibby arrange for Albanian Chicken Nuggets to sponsor Bromwell High, resulting in a drastic change to the school curriculum.
12	"Drama Queen"	19 April 2005	9 October 2006 (DVD)
Martin and Carol Jackson's marriage is in tatters, and Carol decides to put her energy into organising a school play to exorcise her woes. Latrina is given the star role but encounters an extreme bout of stage fright. Meanwhile, Iqbal and Bibby have managed to secure funding from various banks and must decide how to invest it. A hard-fought battle between the teachers ensues, each one bidding to secure desperately needed cash for their departments.
13	"Sweets"	26 April 2005	2 September 2005
When the girls find themselves in possession of a truck-load of black market sweets, they quickly discover that the sweets are mind-blowing (literally!). Iqbal and Mr Bibby have a chance to shine as the subject of an education article about "Heads and their Deputies"--if the journalist isn't distracted (or worse) by the newly-formed playground sweets racket...or the sudden spate of exploding pupils.

== Home releases ==
In December 2005 a DVD release in Australia featured the first five episodes out of sequence, i.e.: Tolerance, Keisha's in Love, Police Story, No More Teachers and — billed as a "bonus" - Fire Drill. The DVD received an 'M' censor rating, and of the five episodes on it, only Keisha's in Love and No More Teachers were screened in the UK. No further episodes were released in Australia.

A UK DVD release was originally planned for early 2006 - in connection with which a 15m 23s Making of Bromwell High short was certified by the British Board of Film Classification as a '15' on 31 January 2006 - but was subsequently cancelled. The thirteen episodes were certified as '15' on 30 August 2006, apart from Keisha's in Love, which was classified as a '12', for the release of the complete series as a two-disc set on 9 October 2006. This release contains all 13 episodes (seven of which have never aired in the UK, and which appear on the second disc erroneously labelled as "Season Two"), and extras include the previously prepared Making of Bromwell High short, deleted scenes and outtakes, commentary on the episode Sweets, and the original animatic storyboard for Baby Boom.

An uncensored Canadian DVD set was released on 19 August 2008 from Phase 4 Films / kaBOOM! Entertainment and Teletoon as Bromwell High - The Complete Season (Polyvalente Baptiste Huard - La Saison Complète in French). It featured all episodes on two discs, with a rating of 18A under the Canadian Home Video Rating System.

== Titles in other languages ==
- Portuguese: (Brazilian Portuguese) Colégio Bromwell
- French: (Québécois French) Polyvalente Baptiste-Huard
- Spanish: (Latin American) Secundaria Bromwell
- Russian: Shkola Bromvelya (Bromvell) (Школа Бромвеля (Бромвилль), Bromwell School)
