= Robert Appleby Bartram =

Robert Appleby Bartram may refer to:

- Sir Robert Appleby Bartram (shipbuilder) (1835–1925), British shipbuilder
- Robert Appleby Bartram (British Army officer) (1894–1981), shipbuilder, British Army officer and namesake grandson of the above

== See also ==
- Robert Appleby (disambiguation)
