= Appleby, South Dakota =

Unincorporated community in South Dakota, U.S.

Coordinates: 44°49′01″N 97°03′02″W

Appleby is an unincorporated community in Codington County, in the U.S. state of South Dakota.

== History ==
A post office called Appleby was established in 1884, and remained in operation until it was discontinued in 1897. The community was named for John Appleby, the inventor of a popular grain binder.
