= Steven Appleby =

British-Canadian cartoonist

Steven/Nancy Appleby
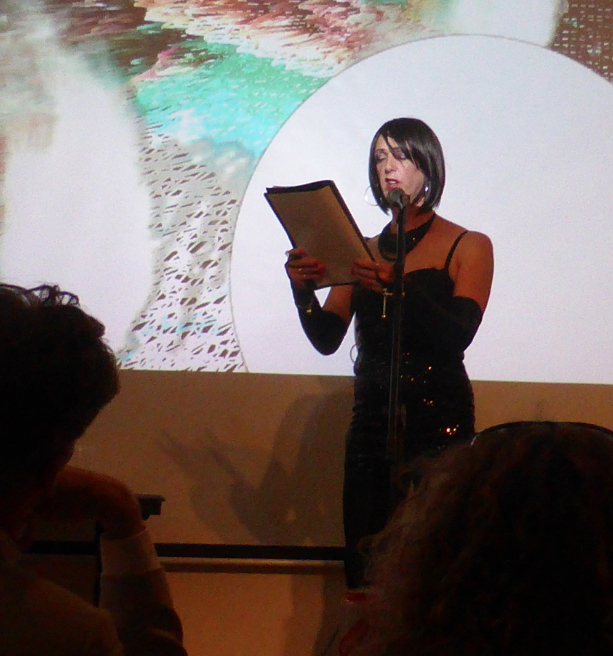
- Steven Appleby at the 2014 Literary Kitchen Festival
- Born: 27 January 1956 (age 70)

Steven Appleby RDI (born 27 January 1956), also known as Nancy Appleby, is an absurdist cartoonist, illustrator and artist living in Britain. She is a dual citizen of the UK and Canada. His publisher describes his humour as "observational or absurd, with a keen sense of the turmoil of fear and obsession that teems beneath the respectable exterior of most of us".

Her work first appeared in the New Musical Express in 1984 with the Rockets Passing Overhead comic strip about the character Captain Star, which also appeared in The Observer, Zeit Magazin (Germany), as well as other newspapers and comics in the UK, Europe and America. Other comic strips followed in many publications including The Times, the Sunday Telegraph and The Guardian. Appleby’s work has also appeared on album covers, most notably Trompe le Monde by the Pixies.

Her comic strip Steven Appleby's Normal Life was translated into German and published in Frankfurter Allgemeine Zeitung, and also made into a radio series for BBC Radio 4. An earlier comic strip, Small Birds Singing, ran for eight years in The Times.

Appleby has also had numerous exhibitions of drawings and paintings, written and drawn many books, and collaborated on a musical play, Crocs In Frocks.

== Early life ==
The oldest of four children, Steven Appleby was born in Newcastle-upon-Tyne in 1956 and grew up in Wooler, near the Scottish border.

Appleby recalls a childhood spent making camps, climbing trees, and hoisting flags outdoors, and reading books such as Arthur Ransome’s Swallows and Amazons. The worlds of cartoonists such as Ronald Searle (St Trinian’s) and Charles Addams (The Addams Family), found on her parents’ bookshelves, also made an impression on her as a child.

In an interview with The Guardian, Appleby describes her mother, Ibbie, as coming ‘... from Canada, a distant land of snow and French toast, far away across the sea, where she skated and skied in the day and danced to big bands by night.’ Towards the end of the Second World War, having fallen in love with Steven’s father, Walter, she came to Britain on a convoy. ‘She travelled alone to live with my father’s family in a tiny village on the coast of north Northumberland while he was still away flying planes in Burma. Together, after the war, they bred boxer dogs, performed with the village amateur dramatic society and laughed at The Goon Show on the wireless.’

Appleby attended Wooler Church of England Primary School, where she won prizes for Plasticine modelling until, aged eleven, she was sent to Bootham School, York, as a boarder, where she pursued her interests in music and art. She played keyboards in school bands and, inspired by Jesus Christ Superstar, wrote and performed (with Nick Battey) Inwards & Outwards, a rock cantata.

After school, in 1974, she took a foundation course in art & design at Manchester Polytechnic, followed by one term on the BA graphic design course (with Malcolm Garrett and Peter Saville) after which she dropped out to play with school friends in a band called Ploog, which was influenced by prog rock and complicated pop that she has described as ‘far beyond their playing capabilities.’ In 1977 Appleby returned to art education. She studied graphic design at Newcastle Polytechnic (1978–1981), then illustration at the Royal College of Art (1981–1984), where her tutor was Quentin Blake. She has lived in London since 1981.

== Career ==
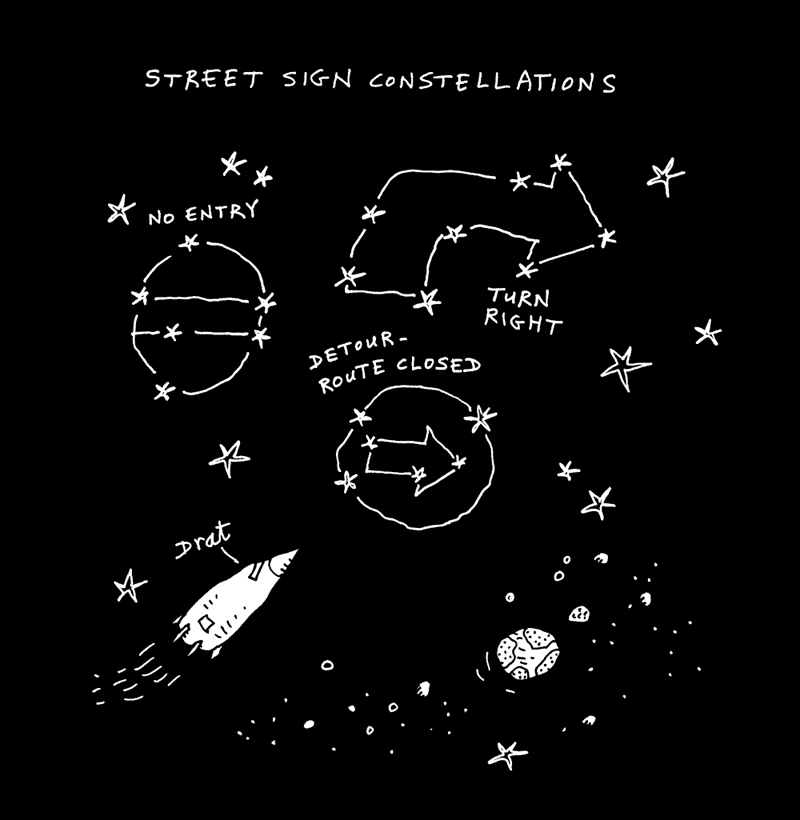
Starsigns , from Daily Life on Other Planets; 2015.

While at the RCA, Appleby met writer George Mole. The two collaborated on a number of projects, including their first book, No, Honestly, I Couldn't Eat Another Mouthful (1984), various cartoon spreads for Punch (Daily Life On Other Planets, Lost Cars), The Observer (Home Economics in the Nineties), The Oldie, and a further three books.

Beginning while she was at the RCA, Appleby worked for her friend and fellow Manchester art school alumnus Malcolm Garrett, who had been commissioned by editor Kasper de Graaf to design a monthly music, art and fashion magazine (New Sounds New Styles). After graduation, Appleby continued to assist Garrett at his company Assorted Images; she worked on book design (When Cameras Go Crazy, More Dark Than Shark), and record sleeves, particularly for Duran Duran. His work on designs for Duran Duran merchandising gave Appleby ideas which would eventually feed into the world of Captain Star, when she was invited by the New Musical Express to submit an idea for a cartoon strip.

Appleby gave up commercial design to concentrate on her own art and creative work in late 1986. Garrett and de Graaf, business partners in Assorted Images, continued to employ her, providing her with a studio and use of the Assorted Images facilities while she developed her own work. A three-year period of patronage followed, allowing Appleby the freedom to make drawings and paintings for various exhibitions. During this time, she developed Rockets Passing Overhead – the Annals of Captain Star for New Musical Express, as well as creating drawings for Punch and many other magazines. She was also able to create Small Birds Singing for The Times and to write, design and draw the comic book Rockets – A Way of Life by Captain J. Star, which was published by Assorted Images in 1988.

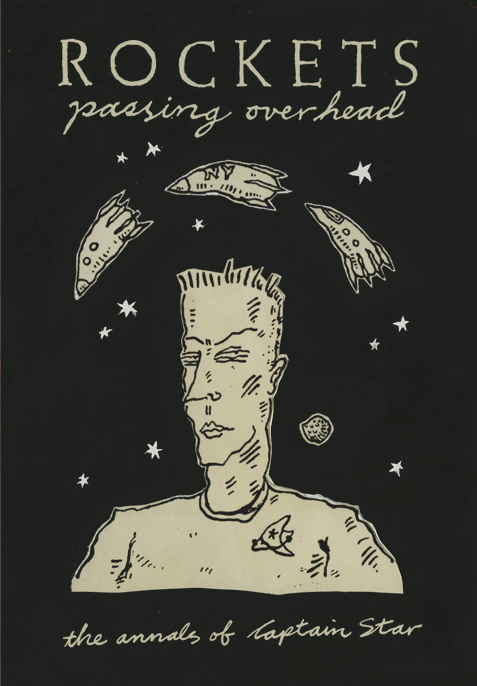
Captain Star illustration for a tea towel design, from Rockets Passing Overhead comic strip; 1987.

In 1987, animator and commercials director Pete Bishop approached Appleby, suggesting they work together. Their meeting led to various Captain Star short animations, a series of TV commercials and the development of the Captain Star TV series (with Frank Cottrell-Boyce). The pilot, written by Cottrell-Boyce, was made in the Assorted Images building. Captain Star (featuring the voices of Adrian Edmondson, Richard E. Grant, Denica Fairman, Gary Martin and Kerry Shale) aired on CITV in the UK in 1997 and was seen on various networks throughout the world, including Teletoon (Canada), YLE (Finland), Canal+ (France), ZDF (Germany) and Nickelodeon. One series of 13 episodes was made.

In 1989, Appleby left her employment at Assorted Images to establish her own studio. Kasper de Graaf continued acting as her agent until 2005.

Appleby has created cartoon strips for publications including The Guardian, The Times, Frankfurter Allgemeine Zeitung, Die Zeit, The Sunday Telegraph, The New Musical Express, The Daily Express and The Observer. She has also written and drawn over 24 books, including Men – The Truth, Jim – the Nine Lives Of A Dysfunctional Cat and Steven Appleby’s Guide To Life – the Complete Guardian Loomus Cartoons, and The Captain Star Omnibus. In 1994 her book of cartoon strips from Die Zeit, Die Memoiren von Captain J. Star, won the Max & Moritz Prize in Germany.

Her other works include the musical play Crocs In Frocks (with Teresa Early & Roger Gosling), performed by theatre company New Peckham Varieties at The Magic Eye Theatre, Peckham and at the ICA, London (2006); and the radio series, Steven Appleby’s Normal Life, which ran for two series and a Christmas special on BBC Radio 4 from 2001 to 2004.

Since 2007 Appleby has collaborated with Linda McCarthy (of Tiny Elephants Ltd) on a series of stop motion animated films based on her eccentric country house cartoon strip Small Birds Singing. A new Small Birds Singing short film, Bob Bobbin and the Christmas Stocking, is currently in production. They also collaborated, in 2011, on a looped gallery piece entitled A Small Repetition of Myself in which a puppet Steven Appleby thinks, draws, discards, then starts over – forever.

Appleby has had numerous solo exhibitions of paintings, prints and ceramics, including Islands (2011) at The Scottish Gallery, Edinburgh and Tell Me All Your Secrets And I Will Put Them In My Drawings (2005), Icebergs (2008) and REAL | UNREAL (2016) at ArteArtesania, Soller, Mallorca.

Appleby spent 2013 as the artist appointed to create all the art for the Royal Brompton Hospital’s new Centre for Sleep As part of this project she made approximately seventy drawings and paintings, including a large glass screen, ‘sleep maps’ painted directly onto the walls, and a book, Into Sleep, to celebrate the completion of the work. She is currently working on a new sleep commission for the hospital.

Her images of rockets feature on the Pixies album sleeve, Trompe Le Monde, and in 2014 she produced over 100 drawings for The Good Inn, a novel by Pixies frontman Black Francis & writer Josh Frank, which was launched with events in New York and at The British Library, London.

In March 2016 Appleby was one of five artists invited to take part in a residency at The Carlton Arms Hotel, New York, where she spent a month painting a mural on the walls and in the bathroom of room 9a. Regarding the experience, she stated, "I’ve never stayed anywhere as wonderful and amazing as the Carlton Arms. Every inch of every wall is a work of art. And now I can die happy because they asked me to paint a room."

== Personal life ==
Appleby lives in Camberwell, south London with her wife, her partner, her two sons and three stepsons. She writes, paints and draws in The Shop, a studio she shares with animation director Pete Bishop.

In the mid-1990s, Appleby came out as a cross-dresser. In 2008, she came out as a transgender person.

In 2013, for the 60th anniversary of the European Convention on Human Rights, Appleby illustrated a bride marrying a hatstand. She stated to The Guardian:

I am a transgender person and the right to be myself is fundamental to my existence. I also totally support the right of anyone to marry whoever they like, regardless of gender, colour, race or religion. I am very fond of hatstands but do not personally want to marry one, despite finding them attractive. In this day and age, when few people wear hats, perhaps a toaster would be a more useful companion. Or a bungalow.

August Crimp, the central character in Appleby's 2020 graphic novel Dragman, has stated, "I dress as a woman, but I’m not doing drag. If anything, I’m trans…I think. I’m really just trying to be myself", and a reviewer has speculated that the plot and themes of Dragman "mirror the struggles of Appleby himself".

In 2021, Appleby stated that she is "relaxed about pronouns", going by both "Steven" & "he" and "Nancy" & "she".

== Selected bibliography ==
- Normal Sex, 1994, ISBN 0-7475-1898-X
- Men: The Truth, 1995, ISBN 0-7475-2251-0
- Happy Families, 1996, ISBN 0-7475-2604-4
- The Secret Thoughts of Babies, 1996, ISBN 0-7475-5855-8
- The Secret Thoughts of Cats, 1996, ISBN 0-7475-5850-7
- The Secret Thoughts of Dogs, 1996, ISBN 0-7475-5870-1
- The Secret Thoughts of Men, 1996, ISBN 0-7475-2969-8
- The Secret Thoughts of Women, 1996, ISBN 0-7475-2968-X
- Antmen Carry Away My Thoughts as Soon as I Think Them, 1996, ISBN 0-7475-3740-2
- The Secret Thoughts, 1997, ISBN 0-7475-3491-8
- Alien Invasion:Steven Appleby's Guide to Having Children, 1999, ISBN 0-7475-4455-7
- Encyclopedia of Personal Problems, 2000, ISBN 0-7475-5067-0
- The Truth About Love, 2000, ISBN 0-7475-4833-1
- Steven Appleby's Normal Life, 2001 ISBN, 0-7475-5614-8
- Mr Concerned's Book of Home Therapy, 2002, ISBN 0-7475-6073-0
- A Book of Machinese Whispers, 2006, ISBN 1-905847-01-7
- The Nine Lives of a Dysfunctional Cat, 2003, ISBN 0-7475-6935-5
- ABC of Childhood, 2005, ISBN, 0-7475-7604-1
- The Little Book of Farts, 2006, ISBN 0-7475-8245-9
- The Captain Star Omnibus, 2008, ISBN 978-0-9739505-6-4
- The Coffee Table Book Of Doom, 2011, ISBN 978-0-224-08695-0
- Guide to Life, 2013, ISBN 978-0852-653777
- Dragman, 2020, ISBN 9781787330177

== Writing credits ==
| Production | Notes | Broadcaster |
|---|---|---|
| Captain Star | 13 episodes | ITV |
| Small Birds Singing | Short film (2007) | N/A |
| How to Destroy the World: Transport | Short film (2008) | N/A |
| How to Destroy the World: Rubbish | Short film (2008) | N/A |
| How to Destroy the World: Games | Short film (2008) | N/A |
| How to Destroy the World: Food | Short film (2008) | N/A |
| A Traditional Christmas at Small Birds Singing | Short film (2009) | N/A |
| The Grand Easter Egg Hunt | Short film | N/A |
| Hinterland | Short film | N/A |

== See also ==
- Captain Star
