= Ben Appleby =

English footballer

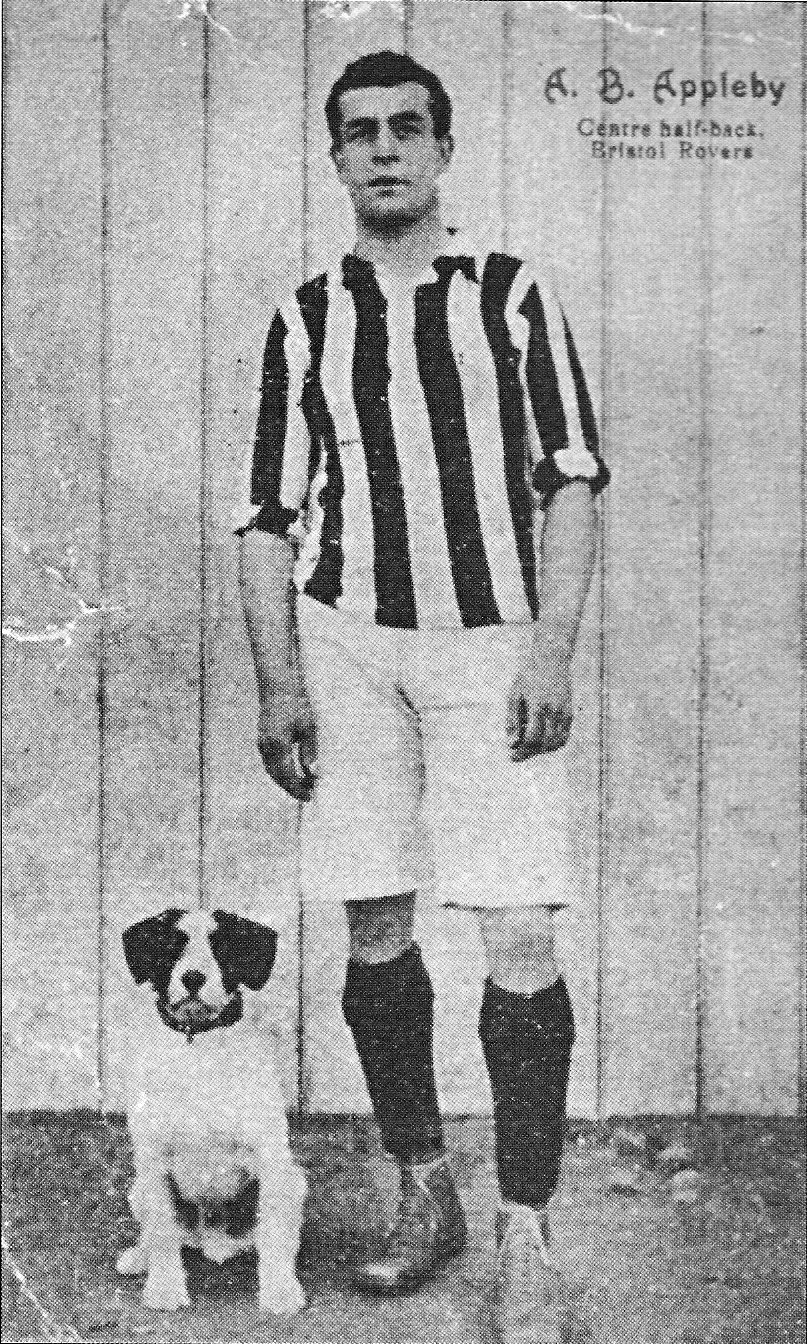
- Ben Appleby during his spell at Bristol Rovers

Personal information
- Full name: Arthur Benjamin Appleby
- Date of birth: 13 June 1876
- Place of birth: Burton upon Trent, England
- Date of death: 22 October 1961 (aged 85)
- Place of death: Bristol, England
- Position: Centre half

Senior career*
Years	Team	Apps	(Gls)
1899–1903	West Bromwich Albion	1	(0)
1903–1908	Bristol Rovers	180	(9)
- * Club domestic league appearances and goals

Arthur Benjamin Appleby (born 13 June 1876) was a professional footballer who spent the vast majority of his career at Bristol Rovers. He was signed by Rovers manager Alfred Homer in 1903 having played just a single game of League football, for West Bromwich Albion against Glossop North End in the Football League Second Division, but he immediately established himself as a regular in the Rovers' first team. He was part of the team that won the Southern League championship in 1905.

Appleby retired from professional football in 1908, going on to play non-League football in Gloucester.

== Sources ==
- Byrne, Stephen; Jay, Mike (2003). Bristol Rovers Football Club - The Definitive History 1883-2003. Stroud: Tempus. pp. 68, 85 & 489. ISBN 0-7524-2717-2.
