= Appleby railway station (disambiguation) =

Appleby railway station (formerly "Appleby West"), is a railway station serving Appleby-in-Westmorland, Cumbria, England.

Appleby railway station may also refer to:

- Appleby GO Station, Burlington, Ontario, Canada
- Appleby East railway station serving Appleby-in-Westmorland, Cumbria, England
- Appleby railway station (Lincolnshire), Appleby, Lincolnshire, England
- Appleby railway station, New Zealand, Tasman district, South Island, New Zealand
