= Pete Bishop =

British film maker, animator and theatre set designer

Pete Bishop is a British film maker, animator and theatre set designer. He is best known as the director of the Channel 4 (Episodes 1-6)/Straight-to-DVD (Episodes 7-13) animation Bromwell High, director of the ITV cartoon series Captain Star, and as the National Theatre's Director of Animation for England People Very Nice.

Bishop was nominated for a 2010 British Olivier Award for animation in set design for his work on the National Theatre production of England People Very Nice.

Bromwell High, a Channel 4 (Episodes 1-6)/Straight-to-DVD (Region 2; Episodes 7-13)/Teletoon/Hat Trick Productions/Decode Entertainment co-production, has been broadcast in the UK, Canada and South America, and won the best comedy award at the 2006 British Animation Awards.

Theatre of Hands, made with M Schlingmann won the 2010 Holland Animation Film Festival (HAFF) Grand Prix.
