= Captain Star =

1997 children's animated television series

- Created by: Steven Appleby; Frank Cottrell-Boyce; Pete Bishop
- Starring: Richard E. Grant; Adrian Edmondson; Denica Fairman; Kerry Shale; Gary Martin; Kate Harper (pilot only); Enn Reitel (pilot only)
- Countries of origin: United Kingdom; Canada
- Original language: English
- No. of series: 1
- No. of episodes: 13

Production
- Executive producers: Dan Maddicott; Geraldine Easter; Steven DeNure; Barbara Biemann; Howard Litton; Margaret Nicoll
- Running time: 30 minutes
- Production companies: Filmworks; Alliance Atlantis; HTV

Original release
- Network: ITV and Nickelodeon (United Kingdom); Teletoon (Canada); Canal+ España (Spain); ZDF (Germany); YLE (Finland); VPRO (Netherlands)
- Release: 8 July 1997 – 27 August 1998

Captain Star is a 1997 animated television series created by Steven Appleby and is based on Appleby's comic Rockets Passing Overhead. It stars Richard E. Grant as the voice of Captain Jim Star. The show was a co-production between Filmworks, Alliance Atlantis, HTV, Canal+ España and ZDF for Nickelodeon UK, in association with YLE and VPRO.

13 half-hour episodes were produced and aired from 1997 to 1998.

== Plot ==
The narrative of Captain Star revolves around the crew of a rocket ship named The Boiling Hell. They receive orders to travel to a dry planet known as "The Nameless Planet" at the Ragged Edge of the Universe, where they are to await their next assignment. The ship's crew comprises the deeply egocentric and often paranoid Captain Star, the Science Officer Scarlett, the nine-headed, six-armed mutant Engineer/Stoker "Limbs" Jones, and the fish-keeping milquetoast Navigator Black. Later on, they are joined by a robot named Jim-Bob-Bob, tasked with laundry duties and various other acts of menial servitude.

Captain Star is heralded in the opening theme song as "the greatest hero any world has ever known." A legendary explorer with hundreds of planets named after him, Captain Star's birthday is celebrated as a holiday throughout the entire universe. Despite his renowned status, the characters in the program find themselves continuously awaiting further orders from Mission Control, which never materialize. Stranded on The Nameless Planet for an extended period, Navigator Black even constructs a fish restaurant during their wait. It remains unclear whether Mission Control has simply forgotten about Captain Star and his crew, but there is an implication that they have spared him the indignity of forced retirement, allowing him to maintain his hero status in the public eye. Throughout the series, events both on and off the planet frequently necessitate Captain Star's intervention.

== Main characters ==
From left to right: Captain Jim Star, Atomic Engine Stoker "Limbs" Jones, First Officer Scarlett, Navigator Black

Captain Jim Star (voiced by Richard E. Grant) — Groomed from birth to be a starship captain, Captain Star is regarded as the greatest captain in the fleet. Leaving the Captains' Academy at the age of 12, Captain Star embarked on a year-long apprenticeship under Captain Ned Nova of the Merry Cheeser. Notably, Captain Nova had named 115 planets after himself, a record eventually surpassed by Captain Star. At present, Captain Star is approximately 127 "space years" old, equating to a man in his 50s in his society. Possessing confidence that borders on arrogance, Captain Star views himself as a hero and deems himself worthy of the widespread acclaim he receives. Despite his lack of humility, he remains unquestionably loyal and firmly believes that his awaited orders will eventually arrive, often disregarding both danger and the advice or concerns of his crew.

First Officer Scarlett (voiced by Denica Fairman) — A strong, brave, redheaded woman, and an accomplished scientist, Scarlett often saves the day through her scientific endeavours. Scarlett's logic and investigative mood are a stark contrast to Captain Star's tendency to improvise in an emergency. On The Nameless Planet, where Captain Star has no ship to command or adventures to lead, Scarlett handles most of his command duties.

Atomic Engine Stoker "Limbs" Jones (voiced by Adrian Edmondson) — Mutated in an atomic accident, "Limbs" Jones has nine heads and six arms. Each of Jones' heads accommodates a different part of his brain, causing each head to have a slightly different personality. Jones is a cat lover, having sequentially named pet cats Sputnik 1 through 374. Conversations between Jones' many heads and other members of the crew often lead them to become impatient and annoyed with him.

Navigator Black (voiced by Kerry Shale/Gary Martin) — Separated from his twin sister at birth because they had different birthdays and once the navigator of the Boiling Hell, Navigator Black sets up a small fish-shaped restaurant on The Nameless Planet and becomes the cook. Obsessed with fish, the restaurant is filled with aquariums. Black often swims with his fish, and even creates a brain-computer interface device that depicts their thoughts. Black has a nervous temperament and often panics under pressure. A running gag in the show is Navigator Black's inability to tell his left from his right.

=== Minor characters ===
Captain Bloater (Gary Martin)

Jasper Quilt (Gary Martin)

Captain Spratt (Denica Fairman)

== Story format and themes ==
Some episodes of Captain Star commence with a flashback to The Boiling Hell's magnificent missions, promptly contrasted with their present state of abandonment on The Nameless Planet as a crew past its prime. These flashbacks serve to set the episode's tone and offer a foreshadowing of the thematic elements in the story. Concluding each episode, Captain Star, seated in his wheelbarrow, recounts an entry in his Captain's Diary that typically begins with "Uneventful day." This is followed by a brief witticism encapsulating the moral of the story.

The Low-Flying Moon, a small moon in an extremely close orbit around The Nameless Planet, frequently passes overhead, causing objects on the ground to briefly levitate for a few seconds.

For a children's television program, Captain Star deals with unusually advanced themes. The primary theme throughout the series is of society's treatment of the aged. While Captain Star appears to be strong and healthy and continues to save the universe, after several years of distinguished service, Mission Control sweeps him under the rug by sending him to the edge of the universe to an unnamed planet and has him remain there without any orders to carry out. Despite continuing to prove his usefulness, there is an ageist undertone that Mission Control assumes that he is no longer a valuable asset because of his age and extensive service.

Many episodes feature a popular TV show titled "Star of Space" in which actors portray the crew of the Boiling Hell in many of Captain Star's most heroic missions. Captain Star is presented as a James Bond-like hero, handsome and virile, who saves the day almost effortlessly. The episodes exaggerate his role in events while minimizing the contributions of his crew — most conspicuously presenting strong and scientifically accomplished first officer Scarlett as a bimbo and damsel in distress. Even when watching events that had just occurred earlier in the episode, the entire crew, except for Scarlett, regard the re-enactments as mostly historically accurate, emphasizing the role of television as a means to control public perception of people and events.

Despite Captain Star being out of the public eye, he continues to be showcased as a hero through public propaganda. By maintaining his active duty status and strategically placing him at the Ragged Edge of the Universe, the public perception keeps him as a timeless hero, forever in his prime. His birthday is celebrated as a public holiday throughout the universe, providing an opportunity to portray him as a larger-than-life figure and promote him as a role model. While not overtly dystopian, there is an implication that the government exploits Captain Star's fame, possibly as a recruitment tool and to foster patriotism, unity, and support for the government.

115 space years prior to the events of the program, Captain Star's former captain, Ned Nova, was ordered into retirement. Ignoring orders, Nova fled in his ship, the Merry Cheeser. Captain Star was ordered to arrest his former captain and chased the Merry Cheeser to a black hole. Refusing to retire, Nova piloted his ship into the black hole. He was discovered in the present day in suspended animation in the stomach of a space slug on The Nameless Planet. Star decided to let him leave in his rocket ship and declared that he could never have been Ned Nova because he was only half Ned Nova's age (thanks to his preservation inside the space slug). While an act of loyalty to his former captain and role model, his willingness to preserve an idealized image of Nova by refusing to arrest him and turn him over to Mission Control in disgrace ironically mirrors Mission Control's decision to preserve an idealized image of Star himself by exiling him on The Nameless Planet.

The program frequently satirizes commercialism in an exaggerated manner. The opening theme discloses that Captain Star's renowned heroics involved renaming inhabited planets after himself, akin to explorers during the colonial era renaming and claiming lands for Europe. He would then proceed to sell unnecessary items to the inhabitants, like a group of aliens purchasing umbrellas before returning to their underwater homes. In the second episode, a persistent "hard sell droid" attempts to peddle a carpet to the crew, refusing to accept "no" for an answer. Ultimately, the crew is compelled to dismantle the droid, revealing its brain to be the size of a pea. Numerous episodes showcase improbable Captain Star-themed products and memorabilia, such as a croquet set featuring a tee and hoops shaped like Captain Star's head, highlighting the pervasive consumerism surrounding Star's identity and likeness.

== Episodes ==
=== Series 1 (1997-1998) ===
No.	Title	Written by	Original release date
1	"The Atomic Alarm Clock"	Frank Cottrell Boyce & Doug Langdale	8 July 1997
To motivate Star to get out of bed in the morning, Scarlett creates an alarm clock wired to the Boiling Hell's weapons systems, which will fire a nuclear warhead at Mission Control if the alarm is not turned off. When the alarm goes off, the Boiling Hell unexpectedly flies into space, seemingly due to a malfunctioning remote control made by Jones. A fan of Star's, Bloater, visits the planet and Star commandeers his ship to pursue the Boiling Hell. They discover the ship's homing beacon was removed and fired into the Junk Nebula to lead them on a wild goose chase, and Star realizes that Bloater's ship is actually the Boiling Hell, stolen and redecorated by Bloater, who wants Mission Control destroyed so he and Star can be free to go on adventures together. The warhead fires and Star and his crew intercept it before impact, and Star arrests Bloater and sentences him to imprisonment in the Stamp-Licking Colonies.
2	"Day of the Zooties"	Frank Cottrell Boyce	15 July 1997
The Nameless Planet is visited by a traveling salesman android from the Zootie Company, who attempts to sell the crew a vacuum and new carpet. Scarlett switches him off and Star orders his merchandise destroyed in the incinerator, but Jones hangs onto a swatch to use as a bath mat. The carpet grows overnight to fill the crew's dwellings and Scarlett discovers the fibers are actually an intelligent organism, which speak in a hypnotic voice to convince Jones not to burn them again. The carpet continues to grow and cover the planet while hypnotizing the crew to continuously wash it. Star uses the android's brain to transform the incinerator into a robot to dirty the carpet in accordance with the salesman's demonstration, but when it goes rogue and begins washing it instead, Star slices open the dust bags on its vacuums, creating a massive outpouring of dust. The carpet recedes and departs into space in swatches.
3	"The Worm Turns"	David Finley	22 July 1997
Scarlet creates a serum that can temporarily shrink objects, but Star is inspired by her microscope and uses it to investigate his meal from Black, and discovers his parsley is actually a species of worm, which Scarlett trains like a pet. An alien ship lands with an important message for Star, and Jones agrees to relay it to Star. A hit on the head causes Jones to forget the message and Star orders Scarlett to send one of her worms into Jones' head to find his lost memories. The worm looks through Jones' memories, represented by a network of storage closets with boxes of files, and takes some of them to nest and lay eggs. To stop the worm, the crew shrinks the laundry robot, Jim-Bob-Bob, and sends it into Jones' head. The worm is washed out through Jones' tear ducts and Jim-Bob-Bob escapes through the nasal passages before it expands back to normal size. Jones remembers the message for Star, but instead of orders, it is an invitation to a ceremony unveiling a new moon in the shape of his head.
4	"No Future"	David Finley	29 July 1997
Numerous unusual events occur on the Nameless Planet, while Star and Jones conduct maintenance on the Boiling Hell. Scarlett investigates a series of caverns on the Nameless Planet and finds cave drawings that indicate the unusual events are forewarnings of an apocalyptic encounter with a comet. A miscommunication with Jones causes Black to dispose of a spring critical to the Boiling Hell's engines, stranding the crew on the planet with only hours until the comet strikes. Jones and Black bicker over who is to blame and, while they each attend therapy with Scarlett, Star has an epiphany. Using the gravitational pull of the Low-Flying Moon to keep the Boiling Hell aloft, in spite of its engine failure, Star positions the ship to be struck a glancing blow by the moon, enough to divert its course to intercept the comet, while the Boiling Hell crash-lands back on the Nameless Planet.
5	"Nine Heads are Better than One"	Frank Cottrell Boyce	5 August 1997
Jones is feelingly lonely after failed attempts to care for various pets and the crew admit they see him more as a crewmate than a friend. Jones sends away for a service promising people their "ideal companion", and meets Friendly Jones, who has six arms like him, but only one head. Friendly quickly endears himself to the crew, but shows disinterest in their hobbies beyond the superficial and advises Jones he works too hard. Believing that Friendly will be a superior friend and crewmate, Jones decides to return himself to the companion service in his place. Friendly neglects Jones' usual duties and the Boiling Hell floods, trapping the crew, while Friendly makes excuses for their predicament. Jones returns and saves the crew, and Star reaffirms Jones is his stoker and angrily dismisses Friendly.
6	"Waiting for Sputnik"	Phil Bedard & Larry Lalonde	12 August 1997
The crew experience disturbances in their hobbies and initially suspect each other, but the culprit turns out to be Sputnik-374, Jones' cat that was lost in space on a previous adventure. While Jones dotes on the cat, it continues to get into mischief and grows at an accelerated rate. Scarlett shows Star her observations from the previous night, when unusual celestial activity took place in "the Great Darkness", and also shows him a crater on the planet that matches a bite impression she took from Sputnik. She believes that the cat is actually a descendant of the original Sputnik, who grew to gigantic size in the Great Darkness, and its children have terrorized the Nameless Planet in the past. Sputnik grows to dwarf the crew and they agree they must get rid of the cat. They deduce it is homesick and arrange for a giant ball of wool to be launched at a constellation believed to contain a portal to the Great Darkness, and Sputnik chases it into space towards the constellation. Sputnik enters a portal and emerges in a scene filmed in live action, depicting it returning home through a pet door and reuniting with its new owner.
7	"Rocket to Nowhere"	Jeff Povey	16 July 1998
A message rocket arrives on the Nameless Planet, but Jones is hang-gliding and accidentally diverts the rocket to the uncharted dark side of the planet. Certain the rocket contains his orders at last, Star sets out to find the rocket with Scarlett and Black, but orders Jones to remain behind and clean in preparation for departure. When it begins to snow, Jones departs after the others, concerned for their safety. After a series of dangerous encounters with strange phenomena on the dark side of the planet, they locate the message rocket, but, to Star's disappointment, it is merely a manufacturer's warning of a design flaw in the crew's space scooter, which explodes. The crew grapnels onto the Low-Flying Moon to escape a pack of two-headed monsters, but see Jones come upon them. The monsters take a liking to Jones, due to his multiple heads, and he tames them, and returns to the crew's landing site to reunite with the others.
8	"It's Written in the Stars"	Frank Cottrell Boyce	23 July 1998
In a flashback, it is shown that infants at Mission Control are assigned crews and jobs based on their birthdate and the positions of the planets and stars at the time of their birth. On the Nameless Planet, it is the crew's birthday, but Star refuses a party because there is nothing to celebrate, and is despondent when the postman delivers the crew's birthday cards, but none for Star. Star's cards arrive the next day and the postman explains Star's birthday was moved and declared a universal holiday. However, because Star no longer shares a birthday with the rest of his crew, he must be reassigned. Captains arrive to celebrate Star's birthday, including Captain Brian, the former captain of the ship Star will be taking over, now promoted to head of timekeeping for the universe. Meanwhile, the Nameless Planet is expanding to dangerous proportions, due to volcanic activity, and with Star's encouragement, Scarlett is able to devise a way to safely vent the lava into space. Scarlett discusses ancient and outdated concepts of perceiving time with Brian, convincing him that one's birthday has no influence on their skills, and they present Star with their evidence. Although initially outraged and believing they are robbing him of the chance to return to active duty, Star decides to remain with his crew and continue to await new orders.
9	"Ned Nova"	Steven Appleby	30 July 1998
Jones is training to be permitted to pilot the Boiling Hell, and crashes his training craft into a space slug that was unexpectedly resting in a cavern on the Nameless Planet. The slug spits out a ball of mucus that dissolves to reveal a statue of a figure in a space suit and Star recognizes the badge on the suit as belonging to Ned Nova, a famous captain. In flashbacks, Star, a child prodigy, graduates the captain's academy at age twelve and becomes Nova's trainee, exploring the universe with him. Nova is eventually ordered to return to Mission Control and retire, but he refuses and deserts, flying into a black hole to escape. The mucus is washed off the statue, which turns out to be the real Ned Nova in a space suit. Scarlett discovers the space slug's mucus acts as a preservative, keeping Nova alive for almost a century. Nova goes missing in the night and Star believes he knows where, and goes to investigate the space slug. Within the slug, Nova is attempting to retrieve his ship and Star aids him. Nova explains he came out of the black hole in an uncharted part of the galaxy and his ship was swallowed by the slug, which came to rest on the planet, due to being unable to digest it. Star has Nova's ship restored and allows Nova to depart the planet to explore the universe as he wishes.
10	"The Gravity of the Situation"	Frank Cottrell Boyce	6 August 1998
A ship arrives on the Nameless Planet, containing Captain Sprat, Science Officer Eric, and Navigator Brown, and the three chat with Star's crew while awaiting new orders. The postman delivers Sprat's orders and she departs, but Star's crew only receive notifications they have been entered in a universal raffle. Black wins first prize, a vacation in the Spice System, and Star's prize is a teddy bear. Star becomes obsessed with the bear and is convinced it actually contains his orders, encoded in the messages played when its pull-string is pulled, but he goes missing while studying it. Black begins to sink into the planet's surface and, when Scarlett recalls what Eric had said about interviewing retired captains, she realizes what is happening: years in space, followed by years on a planet, coupled with depression, are causing them to become dense enough to generate their own gravitational field. Star is found stuck in the ceiling below his workshop and saved, and they save Black. Black is allowed to take his vacation and Scarlett advises a monthly excursion in space to maintain the crew's physical and emotional health. Star lets his teddy bear drift into space, and the bear turns out to be an alien sent as a scout for an invasion, but Star's treatment of him convinces the bears to invade a different planet.
11	"The Collector"	Paul Quarrington	13 August 1998
During a flight simulation, Black is distracted by his snacks and botches his duties, causing the Boiling Hell to "crash". Star advises Black to consider changing careers, and Black admits he is distracted by the health of one of his fish, who has a toothache. Black sends medical x-rays to an institute for rare species to request a doctor, and Jasper Quilt, "the Collector", takes an interest when he sees the skeleton of Jones, who was holding the fish. Quilt goes to the Nameless Planet and presents himself as a doctor for Black's fish, and extracts its tooth after hypnotizing the fish into a trance. Quilt shows the crew around his vessel, which contains specimens of exotic species, but he insists they are all wax reproductions. That night, Quilt sneaks into Jones' quarters and hypnotizes him into a trance, and places Jones in his collection as an example of a nine-headed creature. Quilt departs the planet, but is surprised to see Black aboard, who has decided to become Quilt's cook and fish trainer. They are pursued by the Boiling Hell and Quilt attempts to turn around to fire upon them, but it turns out to be a simulation to trick Quilt into revealing his true colors. Quilt is arrested and sent to the Stamp-Licking Colonies, and the crew unwittingly recites the codeword he used to break his hypnosis, awakening all the captive species on his ship.
12	"The Edge of the Universe"	David Finley	20 August 1998
Black feels unappreciated and takes a long walk, and finds what appears to be a massive black curtain crossing the planet's horizon. He returns the next morning in a far better mood, but also slightly transparent, and unaware he had been gone all night. Scarlett believes he has signs of passing through another dimension and sends up a rocket to photograph the planet from orbit. Black confides in Jones about the curtain, which opens onto a massive auditorium with an audience of various species, and he performed for them to mass applause. Jones relays the story to Scarlett and then follows Black to the curtain, where both of them perform. Scarlett discovers that the Nameless Planet, which travels along the edge of the universe, has partially slipped past that edge and into an unknown dimension, represented by the mysterious curtain. She warns them to stay away for their safety, but they ignore the warning and return, desiring the attention. Scarlett enters the curtain to take photographs and is also persuaded to perform. Star looks at her photographs and discovers four empty seats in the audience where images of the crew are sitting; each time they enter the other dimension, part of their souls remain behind and, eventually, they will be unable to leave and join the audience. Star traps the crew in the cafe and goes to the other dimension, where he regales the audience with stories of his adventures, and he convinces them to let his crew go so they may have more adventures together, and promises to tell them about them when next they meet.
13	"A Galaxy of Stars"	David Finley	27 August 1998
The crew watches "Star of Space", a television show that tells highly dramatized renditions of their adventures; Star is portrayed by Kenneth Shed, an egotistical actor who considers himself more famous than the real Captain Star. Star is unamused by the show and annoyed that Shed falsely claims the two are close friends, and orders the crew not to watch anymore. The next day, Star has gone missing and the crew finds evidence he was abducted, and depart to find him. Star is being held by a Jelloid collector of Star merchandise, and has kidnapped him to enter him in a Captain Star look-alike contest, certain Star will win, but no one will believe he is the real Star. The ship arrives at a convention planet, where many fans of Star and his crew have gathered. Shed also arrives at the convention to be the judge of the look-alike contest, and plans to declare his cousin the winner so people will more closely associate Star's appearance with him. The attendees, annoyed by Shed's narcissism, boo when Shed declares his cousin the winner, and the Jelloid and her henchmen chase Shed off the stage. Star's crew arrive to save him, and the director of Star of Space approaches them and informs them Shed is being replaced as the lead. They offer the part to Star, but he refuses, as there is only one Captain Star. The crew returns to the Nameless Planet and watch Star of Space, where Julian, Shed's accomplice in rigging the look-alike contest, has assumed the role of Star and Shed has been recast as a lowly mechanic.

== Broadcasts by countries ==
UK:

ITV

Nickelodeon

Canada:

Teletoon

Canal Famille

space

Latin America :

Cartoon Network

Locomotion

== Home video ==
At least one VHS release of Captain Star is known to exist, containing the first three episodes of the series.
