= The Captive City (1962 film) =

1962 film

- Original Italian film poster
- Directed by: Joseph Anthony
- Based on: The Captive City by John Appleby
- Starring: David Niven; Lea Massari; Ben Gazzara; Martin Balsam; Michael Craig
- Cinematography: Leonida Barboni
- Edited by: Michael Billingsley; Mario Bonotti; Raymond Poulton
- Music by: Piero Piccioni
- Distributed by: Paramount Films of Italy; American International Pictures (US)
- Release dates: 5 December 1962 (Italy); Sept 1964 (USA)
- Running time: 110 minutes
- Country: Italy
- Language: English

The Captive City (Italian: La città prigioniera) is a 1962 Italian English-language war film directed by Joseph Anthony and starring David Niven, Lea Massari and Ben Gazzara. It is based on the 1955 novel The Captive City by John Appleby. The film was released in the US as Conquered City by American International Pictures as a double feature with The Day the Earth Froze.

== Plot ==
At the end of the Second World War, Athens is liberated by the Allies. Greek soldiers and partisans, fresh from waging guerilla warfare on the Germans join with local insurgents in an attempt to seize power and the British are finally compelled to vacate the city to encamp around its perimeter.

Meanwhile, a small group of men and women in a hotel find themselves besieged by a rebel army that wants the Nazi armaments in the basement.

== Cast ==
- David Niven as Major Peter Whitfield
- Lea Massari as Lelia Mendores
- Ben Gazzara as Captain George Stubbs
- Michael Craig as Captain Robert Elliott
- Martin Balsam as Joseph Feinberg
- Daniela Rocca as Doushka
- Clelia Matania as Climedes
- Giulio Bosetti as Narriman
- Percy Herbert as Sergent Major Reed
- Ivo Garrani as Mavroti
- Odoardo Spadaro as Janny Mendoris
- Roberto Risso as Loveday
- Venantino Venantini as General Ferolou
