= John Appleby (inventor) =

American inventor

John Francis Appleby (1840–1917) was an American inventor who developed a knotting device to bind grain bundles with twine. It became the foundation for all farm grain binding machinery and was used extensively by all the major manufacturers of large grain harvesting machines in the late 19th and early 20th centuries. Appleby's knotting device was a major landmark in the mechanization of agriculture and aided the development of the western wheat fields of the United States.

== Background ==
John Francis Appleby was born in Westmoreland, New York in 1840. In 1844 his extended family of 17 arrived by boat to Milwaukee, Wisconsin. When he was just 18, Appleby invented the basic knotting device that would become the foundation for all farm binding machinery, but no one was interested in the idea at the time.

He served with the 23rd Wisconsin Volunteer Infantry Regiment in the American Civil War, from 1862 to 1865. During the war, Appleby invented and patented a manual magazine feed breech loading needle gun. When the US government rejected the idea, Appleby sold the patent for $500. The weapon was later used extensively by the Prussian Army.

== Grain binder ==
After the war, he returned to Wisconsin and by 1874 had developed a successful wire grain binder. He was unable to gain any financial backing for it because of lack of support from farmers for the use of wire binding because small bits of wire often got into feed grain and were ingested by cattle, causing them harm.

By 1878, Appleby had developed a successful twine binder, which he patented. Twine binders did not cut into the wheat or, like wire binders, kill cattle that happened to eat a strand.

He licensed the twine binder mechanism to the Gammon and Deering Company, which incorporated it into its Marsh Harvester grain binders and harvesters. Primarily on the value of Appleby's twine binder, The Deering Harvester Company (as it became known in 1880) outsold its competitors.

Appleby's design soon became the standard grain binding device used on machines manufactured by Cyrus McCormick’s McCormick Harvesting Machine Company, Champion Machine Works, and the D.M. Osborne Co.

== Later life ==
In 1881, Appleby sold his grain binder machine patent interests to Champion Machine. He continued to work on various inventions, eventually patenting a horse-drawn cotton harvesting machine in 1905.

He died in Chicago in November 1917.

John Appleby is the namesake of the small community of Appleby, South Dakota.
