= Robert Appleby (coach) =

American football and baseball player and coach

Biographical details
- Born: June 20, 1922
- Died: July 11, 2006 (aged 84); Norman, Oklahoma, U.S.

Playing career

Baseball
- 1947: Memphis Chickasaws
- 1953: Decatur Commodores

Coaching career (HC unless noted)

Football
- 1949–1950: Henderson State (assistant)
- 1951–1952: Millikin
- 1953–1956: Toledo (assistant)
- 1958: Evergreen Park HS (IL)
- 1959–1985: Fenton HS (IL)

Baseball
- 1951: Henderson State
- 1952–1953: Millikin
- 1954–1957: Toledo

Head coaching record
- Overall: 6–8–1 (college football); 51–61 (college baseball)

Accomplishments and honors

Championships
- Football; 1 CCI (1952)

Robert William Appleby (June 20, 1922 – July 11, 2006) was an American football and baseball player and coach. He was a two-sport athlete at the Arkansas State Teachers College, playing guard for the football team and pitching for the baseball team. He also played professional baseball for parts of at least three seasons, including a stint at Jonesboro during which he pitched seven consecutive shutouts and 67 scoreless innings.

Appleby spent most of his career as a coach. He was the head baseball coach at Henderson State University (1949–1951), Millikin University (1952–1953), and the University of Toledo (1954–1957). He was also the head football coach at Millikin in 1951 and 1952 and an assistant coach at Henderson and Toledo. He later served as the head football coach at Fenton High School in suburban Chicago from 1959 to 1985.

== Early years ==
Appleby grew up in University City, Missouri, a suburb of St. Louis. He attended University City High School where he was a member of the football, basketball and baseball teams. He received all-county honors at fullback. He attended the Maryville Northwest Missouri College for one semester before being drafted. He served in the Air Corps during World War II. He played football as a halfback for service teams at Kearns Army Air Base and Keasler Field in Mississippi. He later served in Germany where he was a player-coach for the Second Armored Division regimental football team.

After the war, he attended Arkansas State Teachers College (now the University of Central Arkansas) where he played guard for the football team and was a pitcher for the baseball team. He threw a no-hitter for Arkansas State in 1947 and received his bachelor's degree there in 1949.

== Professional baseball and college coaching ==
In July 1947, Appleby signed to play professional baseball for the Memphis Chicks. He appeared in seven games for the Chicks during the 1947 season. He also played for Jonesboro in the Northeast Pro League, pitching seven consecutive shutout and 67 scoreless innings.

From 1949 to 1951, Appleby was the football line coach and baseball coach at Henderson State Teachers College (now Henderson State University) in Arkadelphia, Arkansas.

In July 1951, he was hired by Millikin University as the head coach of the school's football and baseball teams. He served as the baseball coach for the 1952 and 1953 seasons. His teams won College Conference of Illinois (CCI) championships in both football and baseball.

In March 1953, Appleby resigned from Millikin and returned to professional baseball. He appeared in 14 games for the Decatur Commodores during the 1953 season.

In July 1953, Appleby accepted a position as head baseball coach and freshman football coach at the University of Toledo in Toledo, Ohio. He was the head baseball coach at Toledo through the 1957 season. After three years as Toledo's freshman football coach, he became the backfield coach for Toledo's varsity football team in 1956. Athletes mentored by Appleby at Toledo included Mel Triplett who later played eight years in the NFL.

In January 1957, Toledo fired its athletic director as well as Appleby and several other athletic department personnel. At the time of his departure, his 29 wins ranked second among Toledo's baseball coaches, trailing only David V. Connelly.

== High school coaching and later years ==
After leaving Toledo, Appleby worked for many years as a high school football coach, beginning at Evergreen Park High School near Chicago. His Evergreen Park teams won a championship in baseball and finished second in football.

In September 1959, he was hired as the head football coach, assistant baseball coach, and teacher at Fenton High School in suburban Chicago. He remained the head coach at Fenton for more than 25 years. Interviewed in 1968, Appleby noted that the task of coaching high school athletes was more challenging: "You have tremendous pressure in college -- an entirely different atmosphere -- but you also get boys who are more skilled. Actually, I don't think you have to do as much coaching in college."

After retiring from Fenton High School, Appleby taught handicapped skiing in Colorado from 1985 to 2004. He died in July 2006 in Norman, Oklahoma, at age 83.

== Head coaching record ==
=== College football ===
Year	Team	Overall	Conference	Standing	Bowl/playoffs
Millikin Big Blue (College Conference of Illinois) (1951–1952)
1951	Millikin	3–4	3–2	T–3rd	
1952	Millikin	3–4–1	3–0–1	T–1st	
Millikin:		6–8–1	6–2–1		
Total:		6–8–1			
National championship Conference title Conference division title or championship game berth
