= John Appleby (author) =

British author

John Appleby is a 20th-century British author of pulp novels, many of them mysteries or suspense fiction. His works include Captive City, which was made into a film, Conquered City.

== Publications ==
- Tin trumpet at dawn (London : Werner Laurie, 1950) OCLC 10746780
- Aphrodite Means Death. (London : Werner Laurie, 1951) Sydney: Shakespeare Head, 1952. OCLC 223707016. "American edition has title: The arms of Venus."
- Barbary Hoard. New York: Coward-McCann, 1952. OCLC 1662872
- The Singing Cave. Laurie, 1952. OCLC 30168577
- The Dark Corsican. Werner Laurie, UK, 1953
- Stars in the Water. New York: Coward-McCann, 1953. OCLC 1662348. Published in the United States by Dell in 1958, with the title "Grounds for Murder"
- Venice Preserve Me. Hodder & Stoughton, 1954. OCLC 30198989
- The Captive City New York: W. Sloane Associates, 1955. OCLC 1662373
- The Secret Mountains. Hodder & Stoughton, 1955 OCLC 59016005
- The Stuffed Swan. London: Hodder and Stoughton, 1956. OCLC 12652460
- The Bad Summer. New York: I. Washburn, 1958. OCLC 1747219
- The Loving Strangers. London: Hodder and Stoughton, 1968. ISBN 978-0-340-02984-8
