= Total Drama World Tour =

- The Total Drama World Tour logo.
- Starring: Christian Potenza; Clé Bennett; Rachel Wilson; Marco Grazzini; Peter Oldring; Annick Obonsawin; Emilie-Claire Barlow; Scott McCord; Megan Fahlenbock; Carter Hayden; Drew Nelson; Katie Crown; Stephanie Anne Mills; Novie Edwards; Kristin Fairlie; Brian Froud; Carla Collins; Dan Petronijevic
- No. of episodes: 26

Release
- Original network: Teletoon (Canada); Cartoon Network (U.S.)
- Original release: June 10, 2010 – April 24, 2011

Season chronology
- ← Previous; Action Next → Revenge of the Island

Total Drama World Tour (often shortened as TDWT and formerly titled Total Drama: The Musical) is the third season of the Total Drama series. The series' extension was commissioned by Teletoon from the producers, Fresh TV. The season's elements and plot structure is largely based on The Amazing Race, with the semi-final episode being a direct parody of the reality series.

In this season, fifteen returning contestants and two (later three) new contestants are taken on a trip around the world, and compete in cultural themed challenges of countries they visit. An added twist in this season is that they are required to break spontaneously into song, or else be immediately eliminated. The original cast from this and past seasons do not compete in the next season, Total Drama: Revenge of the Island, as there is a new cast. However, nine of these original contestants each have a cameo in the next season, while seven of them return to compete again in the fifth season, Total Drama All-Stars.

A spin-off series based on this season, The Ridonculous Race, premiered in September 2015.

== Plot ==
As with the previous seasons, fifteen returning contestants and two new ones (Alejandro and Sierra, later three with the addition of Blaineley) partake in an elimination-based competition for the grand prize of C$1,000,000 (US$731,485.00), led by series host Chris McLean (Christian Potenza).

In this season, contestants are taken around the world throughout international based challenges and are required to break into song whenever Chris rings a special chime (usually forced and when a mishap happens; Bridgette gets stuck to a pole, the 15 contestants remaining fall off the plane onto Japan, the final four are attacked by a condor, etc.), or face instant elimination. There are 30 songs in total, and every episode takes place in a different location.

As the contestants are eliminated, they take the "Drop of Shame".

This season's entire plot structure and elements is expanded into a related series called Total Drama Presents: The Ridonculous Race, which aired in 2015. This series also takes place around the world and also features eighteen competitors (teams) like Total Drama World Tour, however whereas World Tour was still organized like Survivor, The Ridonculous Race was based on The Amazing Race.

== Episodes ==
Total Drama World Tour is a Canadian animated television series which premiered on June 10, 2010, at 8:30 p.m. EST on Teletoon and it premiered on June 21, 2010, at 9:00 p.m. EST on Cartoon Network. It aired on ABC3 at 6:40 a.m. in Australia.

No. overall	No. in season	Title	Written by (Note: Information is taken from the opening credits of each episode.)	Canadian air date	U.S. air date	Prod. code	U.S. viewers (millions)
55	1	"Walk Like an Egyptian – Part 1"	Shelley Scarrow	June 10, 2010	June 21, 2010	301	2.20
Fifteen of the original contestants of the Total Drama series—Bridgette, Cody, Courtney, DJ, Duncan, Ezekiel, Gwen, Harold, Heather, Izzy, Leshawna, Lindsay, Noah, Owen, and Tyler—have returned to compete in the World Tour. They are joined by two new contestants, Alejandro and Sierra. They are introduced to their new home and transportation method for the competition, along with the new rules of the show. Ezekiel is suddenly eliminated, but manages to make a comeback. The contestants are taken to a new location, Egypt, where they participate in their first challenge, and after Duncan quits the show, three new teams are formed: Team Victory, consisting of Ezekiel, Harold, Bridgette, Lindsay, DJ, and Leshawna, Team Amazon, consisting of Izzy, Cody, Courtney, Heather, and Gwen and Team Chris is Really Really Really Really Hot consisting of Noah, Tyler, Owen, Alejandro, and Sierra.
56	2	"Walk Like an Egyptian – Part 2"	Alex Ganetakos	September 9, 2010	June 28, 2010	302	1.66
The teams using their various rewards, must race across the desert to the Nile River. There, they must weave baskets to cross the deadly river. Sierra and Izzy decide to swap teams, so that they can be with their love interests. In the end, Ezekiel loses his team's reward to an alligator, and along with the rest of his team, is forced to endure the elimination ceremony. As a result, Ezekiel is the first person to be voted off of the show once again, but Ezekiel is not the only one to leave the plane as Duncan quits from not singing. Elimination: Ezekiel
57	3	"Super Crazy Happy Fun Time Japan"	Adam Rotstein & Doug Hadders	September 16, 2010	July 5, 2010	303	N/A
The teams must survive a torturous Japanese game show challenge and then shoot a commercial for candied fish tails. While Heather, Courtney, and Gwen clash based on commercial ideas, Cody and Sierra are forced to work together, and DJ continues to believe he may be cursed. In the end, Team Victory is forced to vote off DJ, because of his bad acting skills. However, with convincing from Alejandro, Harold quits the game, saving DJ from elimination. He says that the team's loss was his fault, then leaves the plane with "honor" by stabbing himself with a fake lightsaber.
58	4	"Anything Yukon Do, I Can Do Better"	Terry McGurrin	September 23, 2010	July 12, 2010	304	N/A
The three teams fly to the Yukon and undertake a number of challenges in the freezing temperatures. Tyler begins to frustrate himself and work extra hard as he tries to get the attention of his former flame, Lindsay. Alejandro takes advantage of Bridgette and gets her stuck to a pole, while DJ gets his team lost . Unexpectedly, Team Chris races past the finish line just in time. At the elimination it comes down to Bridgette or DJ, so Bridgette takes the Drop of Shame for costing her team the challenge.
59	5	"Broadway, Baby!"	Alex Ganetakos	September 30, 2010	July 19, 2010	305	1.59
The three teams head east to the Big Apple at New York City. Sierra's knowledge about the host of the show leads to Chris' plan; however, it is quickly sabotaged thanks to Alejandro's manipulation. Meanwhile, former love rivals begin to team up to go against Heather. After one team wins again and another loses for the first time, it is revealed that the contestants had all participated in the first reward challenge of the season.
60	6	"TDWT Aftermath I: Bridgette over Troubled Water"	Shelley Scarrow	October 7, 2010	July 19, 2010 (Note: All Aftermath episodes were aired as online exclusives in the US.)	306	N/A
The first aftermath of the season has premiered, with Geoff and Blaineley. The other six non-contestants watch alongside as the peanut gallery. The hosts ponder over the whereabouts of two eliminated contestants(Ezekiel and Duncan) after their plunges down from the plane. Harold is interviewed and he sings a song about his crush left in the competition, and Bridgette sings a ballad to apologize for her previous acts of disloyalty. In the end, all is forgiven, much to the dismay of the lesser-liked host, Blaineley.
61	7	"Slap Slap Revolution"	Laurie Elliott	October 14, 2010	July 26, 2010	307	1.82
Chris takes the remaining thirteen contestants to the snowy German Alps, where their next challenge awaits. Alejandro's manipulation of Leshawna causes Noah and Heather to grow extremely suspicious. Meanwhile, Lindsay is finally able to remember Tyler, resulting in him shouting during a song, causing an avalanche. The contestants make a sausage to race down to the second part of the challenge: a dance-off. At the end, Leshawna gets voted off because she jumped off the platform to slap Heather thanks to Alejandro.
62	8	"The Am-AH-Zon Race"	Terry McGurrin	November 4, 2010	August 2, 2010	308	1.59
The three teams are taken to the Amazon rainforest, where their eighteen-hour challenge awaits. One team ends up in deep trouble due to a teammate's poor judgment, giving them their first loss and giving another team their first win. Meanwhile, Owen begins to realize Alejandro might not return their friendship, but brushes it off after being rescued. After Chris reveals the votes, causing Sierra's heartbreak, he then reveals that the episode was actually a reward challenge, sparing Heather from elimination.
63	9	"Can't Help Falling in Louvre"	Adam Rotstein & Doug Hadders	November 18, 2010	August 9, 2010	309	1.87
The contestants arrive in Paris, and everything but love is in the air for these teens. As the three teams struggle to complete their challenge, Sierra is having trouble coping with Cody's previous actions. DJ tries his hardest to either throw the challenge or eliminate his problem, but an unexpected twist ultimately sends Lindsay packing, leaving Tyler upset by the outcome.
64	10	"Newf Kids on the Rock"	Alex Nussbaum	November 25, 2010	August 16, 2010	310	1.53
Chris' hometown, St John's, is visited as the eleven teens compete in their next challenge. DJ (who is the last member of Team Victory) desperately wants to be eliminated, leading Heather to try hard to align herself with him, but is beaten to it by Alejandro. In the end, two teams share the reward and no one is sent home due to Chris' good mood.
65	11	"Jamaica Me Sweat"	Emily Andras & Brendon Yorke	December 2, 2010	August 23, 2010	311	1.47
After the plane runs out of gas, the final eleven are stranded in Jamaica. Owen is starting to have second thoughts about his romantic relationship with Izzy. After an incident, both end up severely injured, with Izzy actually removed from the competition due to the severity of their injury, but not before the two officially break up. Meanwhile, Alejandro's actions from the previous episode are intentionally revealed and because of this, DJ is finally eliminated.
66	12	"TDWT Aftermath II: Revenge of the Telethon"	Alex Ganetakos	December 9, 2010	August 30, 2010	312	N/A
The second installment of season three's Aftermath includes a fundraiser in order to resolve for the plane's fuel shortage. Leshawna, Lindsay, Izzy, and DJ are interviewed, while trying to convince the viewers to donate five hundred thousand dollars. After the Studio experiences some severe destruction, thanks to Blaineley trying to get more views, the goal is increased to one million dollars. Will they reach the enormous goal in a mere thirty minutes or will the show be gone for good? The fate lies in the hands of tough and sassy Leshawna and Izzy, who has turned into a genius.
67	13	"I See London..."	Shelley Scarrow	December 16, 2010	August 30, 2010	313	1.52
With only two teams remaining, the host takes the remaining contestants to London, where their challenge is to capture a criminal before he catches them. In the end, two criminals are caught, bringing Duncan back into the competition, joining a team, and giving his captors the victory instead of the original winners. At the end, Noah ends up eliminated as a result.
68	14	"Greece's Pieces"	Terry McGurrin	December 30, 2010	September 6, 2010	314	N/A
Duncan and the eight contestants travel to Greece to compete in various Olympic challenges. Duncan and Gwen are nervous about their kiss and, unfortunately Tyler has seen it happen and he is forced to reveal it to Alejandro. A fight breaks out and tension between Cody and Duncan grows. After one team wins, three contestants are in the hot seat on the other, but an intern is eliminated instead, sparing Duncan.
69	15	"The Ex-Files"	Laurie Elliott	January 6, 2011	September 13, 2010	315	1.59
The two teams must search Area 51 for intact alien artifacts at Area 52 and bring them back to the Total Drama Jumbo Jet. During the challenge, Duncan and Gwen have their second kiss, thus officially starting a relationship, while an alliance becomes strained. In the end, Team Amazon wins and Tyler gets sent home.
70	16	"Picnic at Hanging Dork"	Michael Gelbart	January 13, 2011	September 20, 2010	316	1.27
The remaining eight contestants travel to Australia, where tension really flares after a past incident. Alejandro and Duncan devise a strategy to weaken Courtney which proves to be quite successful, while the other team is divided into two alliances. In the end, Gwen takes the Drop of Shame after losing a tie-breaker challenge.
71	17	"Sweden Sour"	Terry McGurrin	January 20, 2011	September 27, 2010	317	1.59
The two teams land in Sweden to compete in a "Viking" capture the flag game. Alejandro tries to flirt with Courtney while Cody misses Gwen. Meanwhile, Duncan becomes aware of Alejandro's true nature, thanks to a fallen teammate (Noah), and warns Owen, much to his surprise. Alejandro reveals his true feelings for Heather. In the end, Chris reveals that there will be no elimination again, sparing Courtney and leaving others disappointed.
72	18	"TDWT Aftermath III: Aftermath Aftermayhem"	Laurie Elliott	January 27, 2011	September 27, 2010	318	N/A
After Blaineley forces Bridgette into doing a world tour of Total Drama fan countries, Geoff becomes fed up with her abusive behavior. Noah, Tyler, and Gwen join the peanut gallery, where five of them get the opportunity to re-join the competition. However, one (un)lucky co-host(Blaineley) ends up unintentionally winning instead.
73	19	"Niagara Brawls"	Emer Connon	February 3, 2011	October 4, 2010	319	N/A
The remaining seven are dumped in Niagara Falls for their next challenge, where it is revealed that Blaineley is debuting onto the show and that the teams have merged. The challenges have a wedding theme, leading to added tension for three particular couples. Alejandro attempts to convince Duncan, Heather, and Sierra to vote off Owen.
74	20	"Chinese Fake-Out"	James Hurst	February 10, 2011	October 11, 2010	320	1.70
The final seven go to China for a visit to the Great Wall. Tension continues between four contestants and Cody plans to establish the connection between himself and Sierra. Blaineley allies with Chef. In the end, Blaineley and Courtney are both voted off due to the show's budget problems.
75	21	"African Lying Safari"	Laurie Elliott	February 24, 2011	October 18, 2010	321	N/A
The final five arrive in Tanzania for their next challenge; hunting down Ezekiel who has now gone feral after hiding in the cargo hold. Sierra's obsession with Cody peaks, and Heather and Alejandro continue to deny their attraction towards each other. In the end, Alejandro wins the challenge and Duncan gets sent home for the second time after a close vote.
76	22	"Rapa-Phooey!"	Shelley Scarrow	March 2, 2011	October 25, 2010	322	N/A
The final four contestants are on their way to Easter Island to compete in an egg hunt themed challenge, as Alejandro and Heather maneuver to become closer to the end through manipulating Sierra and Cody. In the end, Heather wins the challenge, but when Sierra is spared, Heather picks Alejandro to stay in first class, so that Sierra may be with Cody.
77	23	"Awwwwww, Drumheller"	Nicole Demerse	March 10, 2011	November 1, 2010	323	N/A
The final four head to Alberta to participate in an archaeology-themed challenge. Alejandro frames Heather to anger Sierra. However, when Heather becomes trapped, Alejandro decides to save her. At the end, Alejandro was supposed to be eliminated, but Sierra accidentally blew up Chris' plane when she brought out lit firecrackers on Cody's birthday cake, and Chris disqualified her from the game for that in pure anger, even though she won the challenge, leaving only Heather, Alejandro, and Cody.
78	24	"TDWT Aftermath IV: Hawaiian Style"	Alex Ganetakos	March 20, 2011	November 1, 2010	324	N/A
The Aftermath show reveals the location of the finale: Hawaii. Owen, Courtney, Blaineley, and Duncan are brought out. Before the peanut gallery is split into three teams and a final challenge is revealed; a representative of each team competes in a surfing competition to win the finalists a possible advantage for the finale. Geoff regains his co-host Bridgette, but with some added company.
79	25	"Planes, Trains & Hot Air Mobiles"	Shelley Scarrow	March 27, 2011	November 8, 2010	325	N/A
After Chris disqualified Sierra for blowing up the plane, Heather, Alejandro, and Cody must engage in a full-out, no-rules race to Hawaii. While Alejandro confronts Heather about her treachery, Cody develops a strong bond with Sierra, who he initially tried to avoid. Ultimately, while Heather guarantees herself a spot in the final two, Alejandro and Cody tie for second place and must battle for dominance in the final challenge.
80	26	"Hawaiian Punch" "Aloha! Finale!"	Alex Ganetakos	April 24, 2011	November 15, 2010	326	1.82
Heather, Alejandro, and Cody come up with a plan to determine who will win $1,000,000. Cody and Alejandro must compete in a tie-breaker to win the last spot in the final two; they had to do a traditional fire dance tie-breaker challenge. Alejandro wins when Heather tricks Cody, eliminating him. After Cody gets eliminated, Chris announces the final challenge, which involves one of Hawaii's active volcanoes. Heather manages to trick Alejandro, bringing them to their ultimate downfall in the game. Alejandro's ending: (Canada, Russia, Bulgaria, Romania, Poland, Africa, Denmark, Sweden, and Hungary). Despite outsmarting Alejandro and kicking him down the volcano on a block of ice, Heather accidentally drops Alejandro's tribute into the volcano, meaning he wins on a technicality. A feral Ezekiel appears and attacks Chris for the case. Everyone runs from the erupting volcano, trampling Alejandro, who asks if he is going to get his money. Then, Alejandro is completely covered in lava flowing down the mountain. When the rest of the cast members are heading for safety by swimming farther out into the ocean, they swim away when flaming rocks start bombarding them. Heather's ending: (United States, Oceania, Latin America, France, Italy, Israel, Serbia, Netherlands, Australia, New Zealand, Brazil, Norway, Britain, the Philippines, and Portugal). She throws her actual tribute into the volcano and wrestles Ezekiel for the million dollars, but fails. After Alejandro is trampled by the cast and covered by lava, the eliminated contestants (except for Blaineley, Alejandro, and Ezekiel) all leave Heather behind to complain that she didn't win. Post-credits scene: After the credits, Chris placed Alejandro into the Drama Machine after he was trampled and burned so he could sign release forms. Then, he arises and asks Chris if the money is safe and Chris tells him about its fiery demise, causing him to shout in horror, parodying Star Wars: Revenge of the Sith. But there's only one way to keep Chris's host life clear: hosting a brand new season. Runner-Up: Alejandro/Heather Winner: Heather/Alejandro

=== Episode finale variations ===
The show's producers created two alternate endings for the final episode, such that the winner seen in one country's broadcasts is the runner-up in other countries (and vice versa) where the show airs. Heather was shown as the first winner when Australia aired the season for the first time worldwide. Heather was also depicted as the winner in airings from Brazil, France, Israel, Italy, Latin America, New Zealand, Norway, the Philippines, Portugal, Serbia, Singapore, Spain (including Catalonia), and in the United States. Canada then aired Alejandro as the winner, which was later aired in Bulgaria, Croatia, Denmark, Finland, Hungary, the Netherlands, Poland, Romania, Russia, South Africa, and in Sweden.

== Characters ==
The main Total Drama World Tour cast consists of host Chris McLean, assistant Chef Hatchet, and the contestants. The remaining contestants from Total Drama Island and Total Drama Action also appear in the show but serving in lesser capacities as commentators on The Aftermath.

=== Staff ===
Character	Voice actor	Description
Chris McLean	Christian Potenza	Chris is the host of the series.
Chef Hatchet	Clé Bennett	Chef is the cook and the co-host of the series.

=== Contestants ===
List of Total Drama Island contestants
Contestant	Label	Voice actor	Team			Finish	
Contestant	Label	Voice actor	Original	Swapped	Merged	Placement	Episode
Ezekiel (Returned to game)			None			1st eliminated (~~Disqualified~~)	1
Duncan (Returned to game)			None			2nd eliminated (Quit)	1
Ezekiel TDI	The Home-Schooled Guy	Peter Oldring	Team Victory	Team Victory		3rd eliminated	2
Harold TDI & TDA	The Uber-Geek	Brian Froud	Team Victory	Team Victory		4th eliminated (Quit)	3
Bridgette TDI & TDA	The Surfer Girl	Kristin Fairlie	Team Victory	Team Victory		5th eliminated	4
Leshawna TDI & TDA	The Lively	Novie Edwards	Team Victory	Team Victory		6th eliminated	7
Lindsay TDI & TDA	The Dimwit	Stephanie Anne Mills	Team Victory	Team Victory		7th eliminated	9
Izzy TDI & TDA	The Insane	Katie Crown	Team Amazon	Team Chris Is Really Really Really Really Hot		8th eliminated (Evacuated)	11
DJ TDI & TDA	The Teddy Bear	Clé Bennett	Team Victory	Team Victory		9th eliminated	11
Noah TDI	The High IQ	Carter Hayden	Team Chris Is Really Really Really Really Hot	Team Chris Is Really Really Really Really Hot		10th eliminated	13
Tyler TDI	The Sporto Who Sucks at Sports	Peter Oldring	Team Chris Is Really Really Really Really Hot	Team Chris Is Really Really Really Really Hot		11th eliminated	15
Gwen TDI & TDA	The Goth Girl	Megan Fahlenbock	Team Amazon	Team Amazon		12th eliminated	16
Owen TDI & TDA	The Big Guy	Scott McCord	Team Chris Is Really Really Really Really Hot	Team Chris Is Really Really Really Really Hot	None	13th eliminated	19
Blaineley	The Celebrity Manhunt Host	Carla Collins			None	14th/15th eliminated	20
Courtney TDI & TDA	The Overachiever	Emilie-Claire Barlow	Team Amazon	Team Amazon	None	14th/15th eliminated	20
Duncan TDI & TDA	The Juvie	Drew Nelson	None	Team Chris Is Really Really Really Really Hot	None	16th eliminated	21
Sierra	The Obsessive Uber-Fan	Annick Obonsawin	Team Chris Is Really Really Really Really Hot	Team Amazon	None	17th eliminated (Disqualified)	23
Cody TDI	The Geek	Peter Oldring	Team Amazon	Team Amazon	None	18th eliminated	26
Heather TDI & TDA	The Queen Bee	Rachel Wilson	Team Amazon	Team Amazon	None	Winner/Runner-up	26
Alejandro	The Arch Villain	Marco Grazzini	Team Chris Is Really Really Really Really Hot	Team Chris Is Really Really Really Really Hot	None	Winner/Runner-Up	26

== Season summary ==
Total Drama World Tour season summary
Episode			Original airdate		Challenge					Eliminated	
No.	Title	Written by	Canada	United States	Location		Song(s)	Winner(s)		Team	Contestant
1	"Walk Like an Egyptian—Part 1"	Shelley Scarrow	June 10, 2010	June 21, 2010	(Egypt)	Giza, Egypt	"Come Fly With Us"	Team Victory		None	~~Ezekiel~~; Duncan
2	"Walk Like an Egyptian—Part 2"	Alex Ganetakos	Sept. 9, 2010	June 28, 2010	(Egypt)	Giza, Egypt	"Lovin' Time" & "Rowin' Time"	Team Amazon	Team Chris	Team Victory	Ezekiel
3	"Super Happy Crazy Fun Time Japan"	Doug Hadders & Adam Rotstein	Sept. 16, 2010	July 5, 2010	(Japan)	Tokyo, Japan	"Before We Die"	Team Amazon	Team Chris	Team Victory	Harold
4	"Anything Yukon Do, I Can Do Better"	Terry McGurrin	Sept. 23, 2010	July 12, 2010	(Canada)	Yukon, CA	"Stuck to a Pole"	Team Chris	Team Amazon	Team Victory	Bridgette
5	"Broadway, Baby!"	Alex Ganetakos	Sept. 30, 2010	July 19, 2010	(United States)	New York City, NY, US	"What's Not to Love"	Team Amazon		None	
6	"Aftermath: Bridgette Over Troubled Water"	Shelley Scarrow	Oct. 7, 2010	Online	None		"Baby" & "I'm Sorry"	Total Drama Aftermath			
7	"Slap Slap Revolution"	Laurie Elliot	Oct. 14, 2010	July 26, 2010	(Germany)	The German Alps	"Eine Kleine"	Team Amazon	Team Chris	Team Victory	Leshawna
8	"The Am-AH-Zon Race"	Terry McGurrin	Nov. 4, 2010	Aug. 2, 2010	(Peru)	The Amazon, Peru	"Gypsy Rap"	Team Victory	Team Chris	None	
9	"Can't Help Falling in Louvre"	Doug Hadders & Adam Rotstein	Nov. 18, 2010	Aug. 9, 2010	(France)	Paris, France	"Paris in the Springtime"	Team Amazon	Team Chris	Team Victory	Lindsay
10	"Newf Kids on the Rock"	Alex Nussbaum	Nov. 25, 2010	Aug. 16, 2010	(Canada)	St. John's, NL, CA	"Sea Shanty Mix"	Team Chris	Team Victory	None	
11	"Jamaica Me Sweat"	Emily Andras & Brendon Yorke	Dec. 2, 2010	Aug. 23, 2010	(Jamaica)	Montego Bay, Jamaica	"Oh My Izzy"	TBD		Team Chris	Izzy
11	"Jamaica Me Sweat"	Emily Andras & Brendon Yorke	Dec. 2, 2010	Aug. 23, 2010	(Jamaica)	Montego Bay, Jamaica	"Oh My Izzy"	Team Chris	Team Amazon	Team Victory	DJ
12	"Aftermath: Revenge of the Telethon"	Alex Ganetakos	Dec. 9, 2010	Online	None		"Save This Show" & "Sisters"	Total Drama Aftermath			
13	"I See London..."	Shelley Scarrow	Dec. 16, 2010	Aug. 30, 2010	(United Kingdom)	London, United Kingdom	"Changing Guard Mix"	Team Amazon		Team Chris	Noah
14	"Greece's Pieces"	Terry McGurrin	Dec. 30, 2010	Sept. 6, 2010	(Greece)	Athens, Greece	"Greek Mix"	Team Amazon		None	
15	"The EX-Files"	Laurie Elliot	Jan. 6, 2011	Sept. 13, 2010	(United States)	Area 51 & 52, Nevada, US	"Boyfriend Kisser"	Team Amazon		Team Chris	Tyler
16	"Picnic at Hanging Dork"	Michael Gelbart	Jan. 13, 2011	Sept. 20, 2010	(Australia)	Victorian Outback, Australia	"Shear the Sheep"	Team Chris		Team Amazon	Gwen
17	"Sweden Sour"	Terry McGurrin	Jan. 20, 2011	Sept. 27, 2010	(Sweden)	Gothenburg, Sweden	"We Built Gwen's Face"	Team Chris		None	
18	"Aftermath Aftermayhem"	Laurie Elliot	Jan. 27, 2011	Online	None		"Her Real Name Isn't Blaineley"	Blaineley (none)		Total Drama Aftermath	
19	"Niagara Brawls"	Emer Connon	Feb. 3, 2011	Oct. 4, 2010	(Canada) (United States)	Niagara Falls	"Blainerific"	Courtney & Duncan		None	Owen
20	"Chinese Fake-Out"	James Hurst	Feb. 3, 2011	Oct. 4, 2010	(China)	Beijing, China	"A Chinese Lesson"	Sierra		None	Blaineley & Courtney
21	"African Lying Safari"	Laurie Elliot	Feb. 24, 2011	Oct. 18, 2010	(Tanzania)	Serengeti, Tanzania	"Wake Up"	Alejandro		None	Duncan
22	"Rapa Phooey!"	Shelley Scarrow	March 3, 2011	Oct. 25, 2010	(Chile)	Easter Island	"Condor"	Heather		None	
23	"Awwwwww, Drumheller"	Nicole Demerse	March 10, 2011	Nov. 1, 2010	(Canada)	Drumheller, Alb., CA	"This Is How We Will End It"	~~Sierra~~		None	Sierra
24	"Hawaiian Style"	Alex Ganetakos	March 20, 2011	Online	(United States)	Hawaii, US	"Who You Gonna Root For?" & "I'm Winning This"	Courtney (none)		Total Drama Aftermath	
25	"Planes, Trains, and Hot Air Mobiles"	Shelley Scarrow	March 27, 2011	Nov. 8, 2010	(Canada)	Drumheller, CA	"I'm Gonna Make It"	Heather		TBD	
25	"Planes, Trains, and Hot Air Mobiles"	Shelley Scarrow	March 27, 2011	Nov. 8, 2010	(Mexico)	Tijuana, MX	"I'm Gonna Make It"	Heather		TBD	
25	"Planes, Trains, and Hot Air Mobiles"	Shelley Scarrow	March 27, 2011	Nov. 8, 2010	(United States)	Hawaii, US	"I'm Gonna Make It"	Heather		TBD	
26	"Hawaiian Punch"	Alex Ganetakos	April 24, 2011	Nov. 15, 2010	(United States)	Hawaii, US	"Versus"	Alejandro		None	Cody
26	"Hawaiian Punch"	Alex Ganetakos	April 24, 2011	Nov. 15, 2010	(United States)	Hawaii, US	"Versus"	Alejandro/Heather		None	Heather/Alejandro

== Elimination table ==
Contestant	Episode																									
Contestant	1–2	3	4	5	6	7	8	9	10	11	12	13	14	15	16	17	18	19	20	21	22	23		24	25–26	26
Alejandro	WIN (Note: This contestant got second place in the challenge.)	WIN	WIN	—N/a	—N/a	WIN	WIN	WIN	WIN	WIN	—N/a	SAFE	SAFE	SAFE	WIN	WIN	—N/a	SAFE	SAFE	WIN	SAFE	BTM2		—N/a	SAFE	WINNER/RUNNER UP
Heather	WIN	WIN	WIN	WIN	—N/a	WIN	BTM2	WIN	SAFE	WIN	—N/a	WIN	WIN	WIN	SAFE	—N/a	—N/a	BTM2	SAFE	BTM2	WIN	SAFE		—N/a	WIN	WINNER/RUNNER-UP
Cody	WIN	WIN	WIN	WIN	—N/a	WIN	SAFE	WIN	SAFE	WIN	—N/a	WIN	WIN	WIN	SAFE	—N/a	—N/a	SAFE	SAFE	SAFE	SAFE	BTM2		—N/a	OUT	
Sierra	WIN	WIN	WIN	WIN	—N/a	WIN	BTM3	WIN	SAFE	WIN	—N/a	WIN	WIN	WIN	SAFE	—N/a	—N/a	BTM2	WIN	BTM2	BTM2	~~WIN~~	DQ			
Duncan	QUIT											SAFE	BTM2	SAFE	WIN	WIN	—N/a	WIN	SAFE	OUT						
Blaineley					Host						Host						WIN	SAFE	OUT					LOST		
Courtney	WIN	WIN	WIN	WIN	—N/a	WIN	SAFE	WIN	SAFE	WIN	—N/a	WIN	WIN	WIN	BTM2	—N/a	—N/a	WIN	OUT					WIN		
Owen	WIN	WIN	WIN	—N/a	—N/a	WIN	WIN	WIN	WIN	WIN	—N/a	SAFE	SAFE	SAFE	WIN	WIN	—N/a	OUT								
Gwen	WIN	WIN	WIN	WIN	—N/a	WIN	BTM3	WIN	SAFE	WIN	—N/a	WIN	WIN	WIN	OUT											
Tyler	WIN	WIN	WIN	—N/a	—N/a	WIN	WIN	WIN	WIN	WIN	—N/a	SAFE	SAFE	OUT			LOST									
Noah	WIN	WIN	WIN	—N/a	—N/a	WIN	WIN	WIN	WIN	WIN	—N/a	OUT					LOST									
DJ	BTM2	BTM2	BTM2	—N/a	—N/a	BTM2	WIN	BTM2	WIN	OUT	Guest															
Izzy	WIN	WIN	WIN	—N/a	—N/a	WIN	WIN	WIN	WIN	EVAC.	Guest															
Lindsay	SAFE	SAFE	SAFE	—N/a	—N/a	SAFE	WIN	OUT			Guest						LOST									
Leshawna	SAFE	SAFE	SAFE	—N/a	—N/a	OUT					Guest						LOST									
Bridgette	SAFE	SAFE	OUT		Guest						Host						Host							Host		
Harold	SAFE	QUIT			Guest																			LOST		
Ezekiel	OUT											LOST														

== Production ==
The season began production in 2009 when Fresh TV commissioned Teletoon to order new Total Drama episodes for an upcoming third season. This season was to be called Total Drama: The Musical when it first entered production. Keith Oliver and Chad Hicks directed this new season while two new voice actors, Marco Grazzini and Annick Obonsawin had to be hired if they wanted to voice the two new characters, Alejandro and Sierra. The season's title was later changed to the current title, Total Drama World Tour in 2010 upon the airing of Celebrity Manhunt's Total Drama Action Reunion Special due to the singing no longer being the main focus for this season.

== Reception ==
=== Awards and accolades ===
Total Drama World Tour won numerous awards in 2011, from such outlets as the ToonZone Awards and the KidScreen Awards. At the ToonZone Awards, it won "Best Foreign Series", "Best Music Score on a TV Series", and "Best Voice Actress" for Annick Obonsawin. It was additionally nominated for "Best Original Song" for Oh My Izzy (sung by Scott McCord and Megan Fahlenbock), and "Best Voice Actor" for Carter Hayden. In the 2011 KidScreen Awards, the season won "Best Animated Series", "Best Voice Talent", and "Best Tweens/Teens Program".

=== Critical reception ===
Despite the many accolades and the enormous fan appraisal that still goes on to this day, and critical acclaim, some events of this season were severely criticized, such as the under-use of characters who had smaller roles in the preceding seasons, and the overuse of characters who had already won a preceding season or, at the very least, made it far into them. Other aspects of the season that had a negative reception were the creator's handling of Ezekiel (where he was turned into a feral monster over time), as many fans felt he was not given justifiable character development; the constant losing streak of Team Victory and the love triangle between Duncan, Courtney and Gwen. The love triangle was eventually addressed in a video with the show's creators on Christian Potenza's YouTube channel, revealing that the breaking up of Duncan and Courtney was actually a network request, rather than a decision on the creator's part. Total Drama World Tour currently holds a 7.8 on Metacritic, which indicates "generally favorable reviews".

== Media ==
=== DVD releases ===
Australia is the only country that released Total Drama World Tour on home video, which was released on a Region 4 DVD. The first part of the season was released in a Collection 1 DVD on April 3, 2013 while the second half of the season was released in a Collection 2 DVD on August 7, 2013.

=== Online website ===
Teletoon hosted a Total Drama World Tour based website starting in 2010 called Total Drama Online where people could play games and earn badges to win prizes, but was only available in Canada. The site was then replaced with universal games available to everyone in 2013, but removed all special features from the site.
