= Total Drama All-Stars and Pahkitew Island =

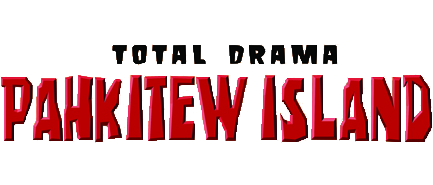
- Top: logo for Total Drama All-Stars; Bottom: logo for Total Drama Pahkitew Island
- Starring: Christian Potenza; Clé Bennett; All-Stars: Cory Doran; Barbara Mamabolo; Megan Fahlenbock; James Wallis; Emilie-Claire Barlow; Alex House; Kevin Duhaney; Drew Nelson; Annick Obonsawin; Rachel Wilson; Brian Froud; Laurie Elliot; Tyrone Savage; Stephanie Anne Mills; Pahkitew Island: Zachary Bennett; Sarah Podemski; Rochelle Wilson; Katie Bergin; Bruce Dow; Kristi Friday; Daniel DeSanto; Christopher Jacot; Sunday Muse; Bryn McAuley; Ian Ronningen
- No. of episodes: 26

Release
- Original network: Teletoon (Canada); Cartoon Network (U.S.); APTN (Canada, season 5b)
- Original release: September 10, 2013 – July 18, 2014

Season chronology
- ← Previous; Revenge of the Island Next → Island

Total Drama All-Stars (often shortened as TDAS) and Total Drama Pahkitew Island (/ˈpækɪˌteɪuː/; often shortened as TDPI) are the two parts with 13-episode segments that both make up the fifth season of Total Drama. The season was commissioned by Cartoon Network in October 2012, ordering 26 episodes. It is a sequel to Total Drama Island, Total Drama Action, Total Drama World Tour, and Total Drama: Revenge of the Island. The season was produced by Fresh TV in association with the Aboriginal Peoples Television Network and distributed by Cake Entertainment. Owing to the series' premise, the season presents itself as a parody of reality television series, such as Survivor.

The entire season first premiered in the United States starting on September 10, 2013, on Cartoon Network with the first part, while the second part premiered in the United States on July 7, 2014, for a two-week time period. In Canada, the first part premiered on Teletoon during their "Can't Miss Thursdays" time slot starting January 9, 2014, while the second part of the season also premiered during their "Can't Miss Thursdays" time slot on Teletoon starting on September 4, 2014. The second half of the season also premiered on APTN in 2015.

== Synopsis ==
Similar to Total Drama: Revenge of the Island, this season also consists of 13-episode segments; though, it returns to the traditional 26-episode length of the first three seasons. The winning characters for All-Stars are either Mike or Zoey, and the winning characters for Pahkitew Island are either Shawn or Sky, varying based on the region in which season finale airs. The grand prizes for both parts of this season are both C$1,000,000.

=== All-Stars ===
Total Drama All-Stars is the first part of the season. Christian Potenza first announced the season in an interview with Tom McGillis (the creator of the series), saying that Total Drama All-Stars would be very similar to Total Drama Island and Total Drama: Revenge of the Island, due to the high worldwide ratings of the latter. Therefore, this part of the season takes place back at Camp Wawanakwa; in a single location once again, unlike Total Drama World Tour. This part is also very similar to the previous season, Total Drama: Revenge of the Island (both being very similar in terms of length, location, features and cameos).

This half is an all-star season which features a return of fourteen contestants from both the first and second generation cast. This is the first season to feature characters from two different generations competing together. The theme for the season is "Heroes vs. Villains", meaning that competitors are separated into teams based on their past performance. Contestants that were relatively kind and good-natured were placed on the "Heroic Hamsters", while contestants that acted antagonistic were placed on the "Villainous Vultures". Both the season's first title, "All-Stars" and the "Heroes vs. Villains" theme take after respective seasons from Survivor.

Cartoon Network's official synopsis describes the first part, Total Drama All-Stars as:

Total Drama is back, but this time the team at Fresh TV have assembled the best loved and most hated contestants from seasons past to compete – Heroes vs. Villains style!

=== Pahkitew Island ===
A brand new island is used for this season. This is the first new main location in the series since Total Drama Action.

Total Drama: Pahkitew Island is the second part of the fifth season. It was first announced on June 11, 2013, as a "sixth" season, even though it is still part of the fifth season. This part features an entire new cast considered as the third generation of Total Drama characters and takes place at a brand new island, due to Camp Wawanakwa sinking into the ocean in the season finale of All Stars.

Italy was the first country to air Total Drama: Pahkitew Island starting on June 13, 2014; the season aired in North America throughout the second half of 2014. This is the first season to air a new episode every day in the United States. This part was story edited by Terry McGurrin, while Dennis Jackson and Melanie Jackson, series creators of Wapos Bay, also helped write and consult the plot for Pahkitew Island. Total Drama: Pahkitew Island was sponsored by the Aboriginal Peoples Television Network, who helped with the Cree translations for the team names and various season references.

A general synopsis from Teletoon describes the second part, Total Drama: Pahkitew Island as:

It's an all-new season in an all-new location: Pahkitew Island. Given that the Cree word for "explode" is Pahkitew, it's no wonder that host Chris McLean chose this new island to put a fresh collection of victims – er, contestants – through the most grueling challenges yet. Once again teen freaks, geeks, egos, and cowards smash, crash, and bash their way through the season with one goal in mind: winning that one million dollar prize. Who will take it home? No one knows until the final episode drops and the pain finally stops.

== Plot ==
Both parts feature a fictional titular reality show that follows the competition of fourteen animated teenagers at a fictional island. For Total Drama All-Stars, the original island used in the first season is featured, where the producers say it is located somewhere in Muskoka, Ontario. The second part of the season, Total Drama: Pahkitew Island, features a brand new island which producers say it is located somewhere in Western Canada. The season's animated characters are depicted as campers who participate in themed challenges and must avoid being voted off the island by other fellow campers. At the end of the series, the winning contestant or the last camper to stand on the island will win C$1,000,000. The competition is hosted by Chris McLean (Christian Potenza), who is assisted by the camp's chef, Chef Hatchet (Clé Bennett).

At the beginning of the competition, the fourteen campers are evenly placed into two teams which are themed to the genre of the competition. In each episode, the two teams participate in a challenge, in which one or more campers can win invincibility for their team. The losing team is called to the campfire at night, where they must vote one of their members off the island. The camper with the most votes is eliminated from the competition. At this campfire, McLean passes out marshmallows to the campers who have not been voted off, while the one who does not get a marshmallow is eliminated. That eliminated person must then walk to the island's dock and will be forced off of the island, and told to "never, ever come back", according to Chris.

About halfway through the competition, the teams are disbanded, after which the challenges continue; the winner of each challenge then only receives invincibility for him or herself, whereupon a camper without invincibility is voted off the island. This process of elimination continues on until two players remain on the island. These two players, are now then subject to a final contest. At the end, a camper wins the competition, while the loser ends up being the runner-up. However, the runner-up is the winner in the other ending of the finale, as there are always two endings to Total Drama seasons. This season, along with every other season in the series, is a parody of the reality show Survivor while the host, Chris McLean is very similar to Survivor host Jeff Probst with the evil persona of Fear Factor's Joe Rogan.

== Episodes ==
The first part consisting of thirteen episodes is an all-star season using fourteen returning characters from the two previous seasons, while the last thirteen episodes consist of a new cast introducing fourteen new characters. Both halves with 13 episodes each are part of the 26 episodes that Cartoon Network ordered in 2012. Cartoon Network aired the whole season first starting on September 10, 2013, on Tuesdays at 7:00 p.m. EST in the United States, with Teletoon airing the season later on January 9, 2014, at 7:00 p.m. EST.

This season also features the 100th episode of the entire series which was aired in Canada on February 27, 2014. The 100th episode of the series is the 9th episode of this season, "Zeek and Ye Shall Find". All episodes for the fifth season are 21 minutes and 20 seconds long, all of them much shorter than previous seasons. This is the first season to feature a 20-second intro, as every other previous season had a full one-minute intro section.

=== Total Drama All-Stars ===
No. overall	No. in season	Title	Written by (Note: Information is taken from the opening credits of each episode.)	U.S. air date	Canadian air date	Prod. code	US viewers (millions)
94	1	"Heroes vs. Villains"	Alex Ganetakos	September 10, 2013	January 9, 2014	501	2.11 Elimination: Lindsay
95	2	"Evil Dread"	Terry McGurrin	September 17, 2013	January 9, 2014	502	1.60 Elimination: Lightning
96	3	"Saving Private Leechball"	Alex Ganetakos	September 24, 2013	January 16, 2014	503	1.56 Elimination: Jo
97	4	"Food Fright"	Laurie Elliott	October 1, 2013	January 23, 2014	504	1.57 Elimination: Sam
98	5	"Moon Madness"	Ed MacDonald	October 8, 2013	January 30, 2014	505	1.51
99	6	"No One Eggspects the Spanish Opposition"	Terry McGurrin	October 15, 2013	February 6, 2014	506	1.51 Elimination: Heather
100	7	"Suckers Punched"	Laurie Elliott	October 22, 2013	February 13, 2014	507	1.45 Elimination: Sierra
101	8	"You Regotta Be Kidding Me"	Ed MacDonald	October 29, 2013	February 20, 2014	508	1.19 Elimination: Duncan
102	9	"Zeek and Ye Shall Find"	Terry McGurrin	November 5, 2013	February 27, 2014	509	1.37 Elimination: Cameron
103	10	"The Obsta-kill Course"	Laurie Elliott	November 12, 2013	March 6, 2014	510	1.55 Elimination: Alejandro
104	11	"Sundae Muddy Sundae"	Ed MacDonald	November 19, 2013	March 13, 2014	511	1.55 Elimination: Courtney
105	12	"The Bold & the Booty-ful"	Alex Ganetakos & Terry McGurrin	November 26, 2013	March 20, 2014	512	1.75 Elimination: Gwen and Scott
106	13	"The Final Wreck-ening"	Alex Ganetakos	December 3, 2013	March 27, 2014	513	1.84 Runner-Up: Zoey/Mike Winner: Mike/Zoey

=== Total Drama Pahkitew Island ===
No. overall	No. in season	Title	Written by	U.S. air date	Canadian air date	Prod. code	US viewers (millions)
107	14	"So, Uh, This Is My Team?"	Terry McGurrin	July 7, 2014	September 4, 2014	601	2.06 Elimination: Beardo
108	15	"I Love You, Grease Pig!"	Laurie Elliott	July 7, 2014	September 4, 2014	602	Elimination: Leonard
109	16	"Twinning Isn't Everything"	Ed MacDonald	July 8, 2014	September 11, 2014	603	Elimination: Amy
110	17	"I Love You, I Love You Knots"	Miles Smith	July 9, 2014	September 18, 2014	604	1.88 Elimination: Rondey
111	18	"A Blast from the Past"	Laurie Elliott	July 10, 2014	September 25, 2014	605	Elimination: Samey
112	19	"Mo' Monkey, Mo' Problems"	Ed MacDonald	July 11, 2014	October 2, 2014	606	Quit: Ella
113	20	"This is the Pits!"	Miles Smith	July 14, 2014	October 9, 2014	607	N/A
114	21	"Three Zones & a Baby"	Laurie Elliott	July 14, 2014	October 16, 2014	608	Elimination: Topher
115	22	"Hurl & Go Seek"	Terry McGurrin	July 15, 2014	October 23, 2014	609	Elimination: Dave
116	23	"Scarlett Fever"	Miles Smith	July 16, 2014	October 30, 2014	610	Elimination: Scarlett and Max
117	24	"Sky Fall"	Alice Prodanou	July 17, 2014	November 6, 2014	611	1.59 Elimination: Jasmine
118	25	"Pahk'd with Talent"	Alex Ganetakos	July 18, 2014	November 13, 2014	612	Elimination: Sugar
119	26	"Lies, Cries & One Big Prize"	Terry McGurrin	July 18, 2014	November 20, 2014	613	Runner-Up: Shawn/Sky Winner: Sky/Shawn

== All-Stars ==
=== Characters ===
7 characters from Total Drama World Tour and 7 characters from Total Drama: Revenge of the Island returned to compete in Total Drama All-Stars. They all competed together during several "Heroes vs. Villains" themed challenges, which means that all the heroes competed against all the villains.

==== Staff ====
Character	Voice actor	Description
Chris McLean	Christian Potenza	Chris returns as the host of the series.
Chef Hatchet	Clé Bennett	Chef returns as the cook and co-host of the series.

==== Contestants ====
The 14 returning characters who competed in Total Drama All-Stars are Alejandro (Alessandro in VQ), Cameron, Courtney (Audrey in VQ), Duncan (Hugo in VQ), Gwen (Joëlle in VQ), Heather (Marilou in VQ), Jo, Lightning (Dutonnerre in VQ), Lindsay (Tania in VQ), Mike (Michel in VQ), Sam, Scott (Steph in VQ), Sierra (Sarah-Laurie in VQ), and Zoey (Zoé in VQ).

List of Total Drama All-Stars contestants
Contestant	Label	Voice actor	Team				Finish	
Contestant	Label	Voice actor	Original	1^{st} Swap	2^{nd} Swap	Merged	Placement	Ep. No.
Lindsay TDI, TDA, & TDWT	The Dumb Princess	Stephanie Anne Mills	Heroic Hamsters				1st eliminated	1
Lightning TDRI	The Over-Achieving Athlete	Tyrone Savage	Villainous Vultures				2nd eliminated	2
Jo TDRI	The Take-No-Prisoners Machine	Laurie Elliott	Villainous Vultures				3rd Eliminated	3
Sam TDRI	The Nice Guy Gamer	Brian Froud	Heroic Hamsters	Heroic Hamsters			4th eliminated	4
Heather TDI, TDA, & TDWT	The Queen Bee	Rachel Wilson	Villainous Vultures	Villainous Vultures	Villainous Vultures		5th eliminated	6
Sierra TDWT	The Obsessive Uber-Fan	Annick Obonsawin	Heroic Hamsters	Heroic Hamsters	Heroic Hamsters		6th eliminated	7
Duncan TDI, TDA, & TDWT	The Delinquent Heartthrob	Drew Nelson	Villainous Vultures	Heroic Hamsters	Heroic Hamsters	Merge	7th eliminated (Disqualified)	8
Cameron TDRI	The Wide-Eyed Bubble Boy	Kevin Duhaney	Heroic Hamsters	Heroic Hamsters	Villainous Vultures	Merge	8th eliminated (Evacuated)	9
Alejandro TDWT	The Arch Villain	Alex House	Villainous Vultures	Villainous Vultures	Villainous Vultures	Merge	9th eliminated	10
Courtney TDI, TDA, & TDWT	The Type-A	Emilie-Claire Barlow	Heroic Hamsters	Villainous Vultures	Villainous Vultures	Merge	10th eliminated	11
Gwen TDI, TDA, & TDWT	The Loner	Megan Fahlenbock	Villainous Vultures	Villainous Vultures	Villainous Vultures	Merge	11th eliminated (Disqualified)	12
Scott TDRI	The Trouble-Maker	James Wallis	Villainous Vultures	Villainous Vultures	Villainous Vultures	Merge	12th eliminated	12
Mike TDRI	The Multiple Personality Disorder	Cory Doran	Heroic Hamsters	Heroic Hamsters	Heroic Hamsters	Merge	Winner/Runner-up	13
Zoey TDRI	The Indie Chick	Barbara Mamabolo	Heroic Hamsters	Heroic Hamsters	Heroic Hamsters	Merge	Winner/Runner-up	13

=== Elimination Table ===
Contestant	Episode												
Contestant	1	2	3	4	5	6	7	8	9	10	11	12	13
Zoey	In	Win	Win	In	In	Win	In	In	In	Win	Win	Win	WINNER/RUNNER UP
Mike	In	Win	Win	In	In	Win (Note: This contestant won the challenge and was exiled to Boney Island.)	In	In	In	Low	In	Low	WINNER/RUNNER-UP
Scott	Win	In	In	Win	Win	In	Win	In	In	In	Low	Out	
Gwen	Win	In	In	Win	Win	In	Win	In	Win	In (Note: This contestant was exiled to Boney Island.)	In	DQ	Lose
Courtney	Low	Win	Win	Win	Win	In	Win	In	In	In	Out		
Alejandro	Win	In	In	Win	Win	Safe	Win	Win	In	Out			Lose
Cameron	In	Win	Win	In	Low	In	Win	Low	Evac.				Lose
Duncan	Win	In	In	In	In	Win	In	DQ					
Sierra	In	Win	Win	Low	In	Win	Out						
Heather	Win	In	Low	Win	Win	Out							Lose
Sam	In	Win	Win	Out									
Jo	Win	Low	Out										
Lightning	Win	Out											
Lindsay	Out												

=== Locations Table ===
	Locations		
	Camp Wawanakwa		Boney Island
	McLean Spa Hotel	Cabins	Boney Island
Episode 1	Alejandro, Duncan, Gwen, Heather, Jo, Scott	Cameron, Courtney, Mike, Sam, Sierra, Zoey	Lightning
Episode 2	Cameron, Courtney, Mike, Sierra, Zoey	Alejandro, Duncan, Gwen, Heather, Jo, Scott	Sam
Episode 3	Cameron, Duncan, Mike, Sam, Sierra, Zoey	Alejandro, Courtney, Gwen, Heather, Scott	Cameron
Episode 4	Alejandro, Courtney, Gwen, Heather, Scott	Cameron, Duncan, Mike, Sierra, Zoey	Scott
Episode 5	Alejandro, Cameron, Courtney, Gwen, Heather, Scott	Duncan, Mike, Sierra, Zoey	Scott
Episode 6	Duncan, Sierra, Zoey	Alejandro, Cameron, Courtney, Gwen, Scott	Mike
Episode 7	Cameron, Courtney, Gwen, Scott	Duncan, Mike, Zoey	Alejandro
Episode 8	Alejandro	Cameron, Courtney, Gwen, Mike, Scott, Zoey	—N/a
Episode 9	Gwen	Courtney, Mike, Scott, Zoey	Alejandro
Episode 10	Zoey, Mike	Courtney, Scott	Gwen
Episode 11	Zoey	Gwen, Mike, Scott	—N/a
Episode 12	Zoey	Mike	—N/a

== Pahkitew Island ==
=== Characters ===
These are the fourteen new characters that were introduced in the second part of this season. Listed from left to right in order: Standing: Beardo, Max, Scarlett, Dave, Ella, Shawn (French Canadian/American winner), Sugar, and Leonard Sitting: Sky (English Canadian winner), Jasmine, Sammy (Samey), Amy, Topher, and Rodney

Total Drama: Pahkitew Island features an entire new cast. This is the second time the series completely replaces any existing cast with an all new cast. The new characters competing are Amy, Beardo (Barbu in VQ), Dave (David in VQ), Ella (Eleanor in VQ), Jasmine, Leonard, Max, Rodney, Samey, Scarlett, Shawn (Cédric in VQ), Sky (Kristelle in VQ), Sugar, and Topher (Quentin in VQ).

==== Staff ====
Character	Voice actor	Description
Chris McLean	Christian Potenza	Chris returns as the host of the series.
Chef Hatchet	Clé Bennett	Chef returns as the cook and co-host of the series.

==== Contestants ====
List of Total Drama: Pahkitew Island contestants
Contestant	Label	Voice actor	Team			Finish	
Contestant	Label	Voice actor	Original	Swap	Merged	Placement	Ep. No.
Beardo	The Human Soundboard	Clé Bennett	Wâneyihtam Maskwak			1st eliminated	14
Leonard	The LARPer	Clé Bennett	Wâneyihtam Maskwak			2nd eliminated	15
Amy	The Evil Twin	Bryn McAuley	Pimâpotew Kinosewak			3rd eliminated	16
Rodney	The Country Boy	Ian Ronningen	Pimâpotew Kinosewak			4th eliminated	17
Samey	The Good Twin	Bryn McAuley	Pimâpotew Kinosewak			5th eliminated	18
Ella	The Fairytale Princess	Sunday Muse	Wâneyihtam Maskwak			6th eliminated (Disqualified)	19
Topher	The Chris Wannabe	Christopher Jacot	Pimâpotew Kinosewak	Pimâpotew Kinosewak		7th eliminated	21
Dave	The Normal Guy	Daniel DeSanto	Wâneyihtam Maskwak	Wâneyihtam Maskwak	Merge	8th eliminated	22
Scarlett	The Quiet Brainiac	Kristi Friday	Pimâpotew Kinosewak	Pimâpotew Kinosewak	Merge	9th eliminated (Disqualified)	23
Max	The Super Villain	Bruce Dow	Pimâpotew Kinosewak	Wâneyihtam Maskwak	Merge	10th eliminated (Disqualified)	23
Jasmine	The Australian Outback Girl	Katie Bergin	Pimâpotew Kinosewak	Pimâpotew Kinosewak	Merge	11th eliminated	24
Sugar	The Pageant Queen	Rochelle Wilson	Wâneyihtam Maskwak	Wâneyihtam Maskwak	Merge	12th eliminated	25
Sky	The Athlete	Sarah Podemski	Wâneyihtam Maskwak	Pimâpotew Kinosewak	Merge	Winner/Runner-up	26
Shawn	The Zombie Conspiracy Nut	Zachary Bennett	Wâneyihtam Maskwak	Wâneyihtam Maskwak	Merge	Winner/Runner-Up	26

=== Elimination Table ===
Contestant	Episode												
Contestant	14	15	16	17	18	19	20	21	22	23	24	25	26
Shawn	In	In	Win	Win	Win	Win	In	Win	In	In	Win	Win	WINNER/RUNNER-UP
Sky	In	In	Win	Win	Win	Win	In	Low	Low	In	In	In	WINNER/RUNNER-UP
Sugar	In	In	Win	Win	Win	Win	In	Win	Win	In	Low	Out	
Jasmine	Win	Win	In	In	Low	In	In	In	Win	In	Out		WINNER
Max	Win	Win	In	In	In	Low	In	Win	In	DQ			
Scarlett	Win	Win	In	Low	In	In	In	In	In	DQ			
Dave	In	In	Win	Win	Win	Win	In	Win	Out				Lose
Topher	Win	Win	In	In	In	In	In	Out					
Ella	In	Low	Win	Win	Win	DQ							
Samey	Win	Win	Low	In	Out								
Rodney	Win	Win	In	Out									
Amy	Win	Win	Out		Out								
Leonard	Low	Out											
Beardo	Out												

== Production ==
On June 28, 2011, Christian Potenza mentioned an upcoming season of Total Drama. This was the first time a cast member mentioned a fifth season to the public. One year later on July 19, 2012, Christian Potenza announced a fifth season of Total Drama in an interview with Tom McGillis, saying that Season 5 will be just like Seasons 1 and 4. This hinted that this season will take place back at an island.

As shown in the Fresh TV official website, it seemed that there would be 26 new episodes to be aired in 2013–2014 for Season 5. Tom McGillis later stated that the new 26 episodes will be split into two 13-episode seasons; where the first part will feature some of the existing cast, while the second part will consist of an only new cast which are yet to be introduced. Voice actors began recording lines for Season 5 in December 2012.

=== Total Drama All-Stars ===
On January 28, 2013, Cartoon Network confirmed that the new season title will be Total Drama All-Stars for Part 1. Two days later on January 30, both Christian Potenza and Drew Nelson confirmed the title for Episode 4 which is "Food Fright". Drew Nelson also confirmed that the two new teams for this season are the Heroic Hamsters and the Villainous Vultures. Rumors started floating in early 2010 about the season being "Heroes vs. Villains" and that both the original and the new cast would compete together, but it wasn't until December 19, 2012, when Tom McGillis confirmed on ABC3 Australia that the theme for this season will indeed be "Heroes vs. Villains".

On February 1, 2013, Christian Potenza released a new video that contains several new information about Total Drama All-Stars, including season episode titles, new voice actors, and plot information. That same day, Christian Potenza also released the first lines of the season from Episode 4:

When a Hero's eating time is up, they hear this ... and the Villains get this ... Last time on a very special episode of Total Drama All-Stars: ... Say hello to my metal friend! ... I sincerely doubt it, Al ... next, I'll allow it, his pain was our gain ... Which team will finish their barf-tastic breakfast first? Find out after the break on Total Drama All-Stars!

On June 11, 2013, it was confirmed that the airdate for the whole season will take place in early 2014; mostly during the winter of 2014. Tom McGillis later confirmed on Twitter that the Canadian airdate will be in January 2014, while the U.S. airdate will be in September 2013. On August 19, 2013, Cartoon Network released the first official trailer for Total Drama All-Stars along with a new website that reveals all the characters. Lindsay and Jo's eliminations were leaked via episode scripts and trailers before the season started airing.

=== Total Drama: Pahkitew Island ===
As for Total Drama: Pahkitew Island, production was done, and it was released in the United States. The season was first announced to air on May 27, but was later delayed to July 7. This part is under the same production code as the previous part, Total Drama All-Stars. However, the script for the entire first episode was leaked online about a year before the season's release. Scarlett's final design along with one second of the fully animated first episode was also leaked on Instagram by her Venezuelan Spanish voice actor.

On March 21, 2014, the entire cast design was revealed by Fresh TV along with new promotions for the season. Bryn McAuley who will be voicing the twins, Amy and Samey, was the first confirmed voice actress. On April 9, 2014, Fresh TV Inc. celebrated the International Day of Pink by making the Pahkitew Island cast all wear pink clothing, symbolizing the support for anti-bullying. Before the official cast release Sunday Muse was also confirmed to voice Ella, while Ian Ronningen was set to voice Rodney. On May 30, 2014, a new teaser trailer was released for Total Drama: Pahkitew Island in Italy, marking the first time fully animated scenes were released to the public. Several trailers in English were released later on Cake Entertainment's website. On June 16, Cartoon Network posted the Pahkitew Island website, along with the audition tapes for Sugar, Samey, Amy, Leonard, and Max. Italy was the first country to air full episodes of Pahkitew Island. On June 23, the audition tapes of Beardo, Rodney, Ella, Topher, and Dave were released. On June 26, the entire cast and the characters they voiced were released via Fresh's re:fresh blog. On July 1, ABC3 announced that Total Drama: Pahkitew Island will air on July 14, 2014, in Australia.

== Reception ==
=== Ratings ===
Total Drama All-Stars was the #1 telecast on Cartoon Network with the highest ratings for the week of the season premiere. Additionally, it ranked as the #1 telecast on all television among kids 6–11 and 9–14 for Tuesday prime-time airings. It also claimed #1 in its 7 p.m. time period among kids 9–14 and 6–11.

=== Critical reaction ===
Like the previous season, both parts of the fifth season were criticised for their short length in comparison to the first three seasons.

==== All-Stars ====
Total Drama All-Stars has received mixed-to-negative reviews from critics, but overwhelmingly unfavorable reviews from the show's fanbase. Many lamented the "character derailment" within the old and new cast of characters, especially that of the host Chris McLean, the predictability of eliminations, the absurdity of the show despite its "reality show" premise, and for leaving many character arcs unresolved.

==== Pahkitew Island ====
Total Drama: Pahkitew Island received considerably more positive reviews from critics. However, there was some criticism regarding the stereotypes of the new cast, with many criticising the new contestants for being unrealistic and, as with All-Stars, for the lack of closure to certain character arcs in-tandem with Chris McLean's aforementioned derailment.

== See also ==
- Total Drama Island (the original set of contestants)
- Total Drama: Revenge of the Island (the first time a new cast was introduced)
