= Mia Kihl =

Swedish voice actress

Maria Kihl or Mia Kihl (born April 23, 1979 in Stockholm), is a Swedish voice actress.

== Roles ==
- The Fairly OddParents - Vicky (Starting from Season 2).
- Goof Troop - Max.
- Quack Pack - Louie.
- TaleSpin - Molly Cunningham (1st Voice), Additional Voices.
- Total Drama Island - Sadie.
- Yu-Gi-Oh! - Anzu Mazaki
- Winx Club - Flora
- Fuller House - Kimmy Gibbler.
