= Marco Grazzini =

Canadian film and television actor

- Occupation: Actor
- Years active: 2006–present

Marco Grazzini is a Canadian film and television actor.

== Background ==
Grazzini is a University of Toronto alumnus, having majored in Italian and Spanish with a minor in Sociology. His notable TV and movie credits include NBC's Heroes Reborn, Crackle's The Art of More and Fresh TV's Total Drama World Tour. His other passions include photography and cooking.

== Filmography ==
=== Film ===
Year	Title	Role	Notes
2006	Suicide	Militant	Short film
2010	Verona	Jock	Short film
2011	Hi, Honey	Marco	Short film
2012	Margarita	Carlos	
2017	Separation	Party Goer	Short film
2017	Highly Functional	Victor	
2018	Anon	Officer Alvarez	
2019	Good Sam	Jack Hansen	

=== Television ===
Year	Title	Role	Notes
2007, 2015	Mayday	Co-pilot Valendia, First Officer Zille	2 episodes
2008	Of Murder and Memory	Ernesto Navarro	Television film
2009	Being Erica	Jeff	Episode: "Til Death"
2009	Da Kink in My Hair	Mr. Cut N' Run	Episode: "Oil's Well That Ends Well"
2010	H.M.S.: White Coat	Grad Student	Television film
2010	Total Drama Action	Alejandro (voice)	Episode: "Celebrity Manhunt's Total Drama Action Reunion Special"
2010	Total Drama World Tour	Alejandro, Zing-Zing (voices)	26 episodes
2010	Nikita	Oliver	Episode: "Phoenix"
2010–2011	Connor Undercover	The Messenger	3 episodes
2011	Deck the Halls	Fred Torres	Television film
2011	Poe		ABC TV series
2011	Awakening	Zachary	The CW pilot
2011	Wish List	Dr. Sweet	Television film
2011	XIII: The Series	Angel	Episode: "Costa Verde"
2011	Deck the Halls	Fred Torres	Television film
2012	Degrassi: The Next Generation	Soccer Coach	Episode: "Can't Tell Me Nothing: Part 1"
2012	Offline	Paul Rogers	Television film
2014	Beauty & the Beast	Detective Billings	Episode: "Recipe for Disaster"
2014	The Listener	Anthony De Souza	Episode: "The Lockup"
2015	Heroes Reborn	Oscar Gutierrez/El Vengadoe	2 episodes
2015	Warrior	Kade Forrester	Television film
2015–2016	The Art of More	Gonzalo Silas	6 episodes
2016	The Flash	Joey Monteleone / Tar Pit	Episode: "Fast Lane"
2016	The Magicians	Margo's Ex-Boyfriend	Episode: "Homecoming"
2016	Killjoys	Hank	Episode: "Meet the Parents"
2016–2020	Kim's Convenience	Alejandro	CBC TV-series, Recurring; 6 episodes
2018	A Series of Unfortunate Events	Chauffeur	2 episodes
2018	Supernatural	Angel Commander	Episode: "Bring 'em Back Alive"
2019	The Story of Us	Rick	Hallmark Movie
2019	The Murders	Pete Canning	4 episodes
2019	The InBetween	Gio Salonga	Episode: "Let Me in Your Window"
2019	A Taste of Summer	David	Hallmark Movie
2020	A Valentine's Match	Brooks	Hallmark Movie
2020	Christmas Unwrapped	Erik Gallagher	Lifetime Movie
2020	Lonestar Christmas	Mateo	Lifetime Movie
2020	Close Up	Mr. Heller	Television film
2020–present	Virgin River	Mike Valenzuela	Main seasons 3–present; recurring season 2
2021	Right in Front of Me	Nick	Hallmark Movie
2022	Polly Pocket	Matteo, Talk-amole Podcast Host (voices)	Episode: "Guactober Fest"
2022	Designing Christmas	Pablo	Television film
2023	Hearts in the Game	Diego	Hallmark Movie
2023	Haunted Harmony Mysteries: Murder in G Major	Griff	Hallmark Movie
2026	Watson	Miguel Alvarado	Episode: "Sic Semper Tyrannis"

=== Video games ===
Year	Title	Role	Notes
2019	Need for Speed Heat	Cop Chatter Talent	
