= Kristin Fairlie =

Canadian actress

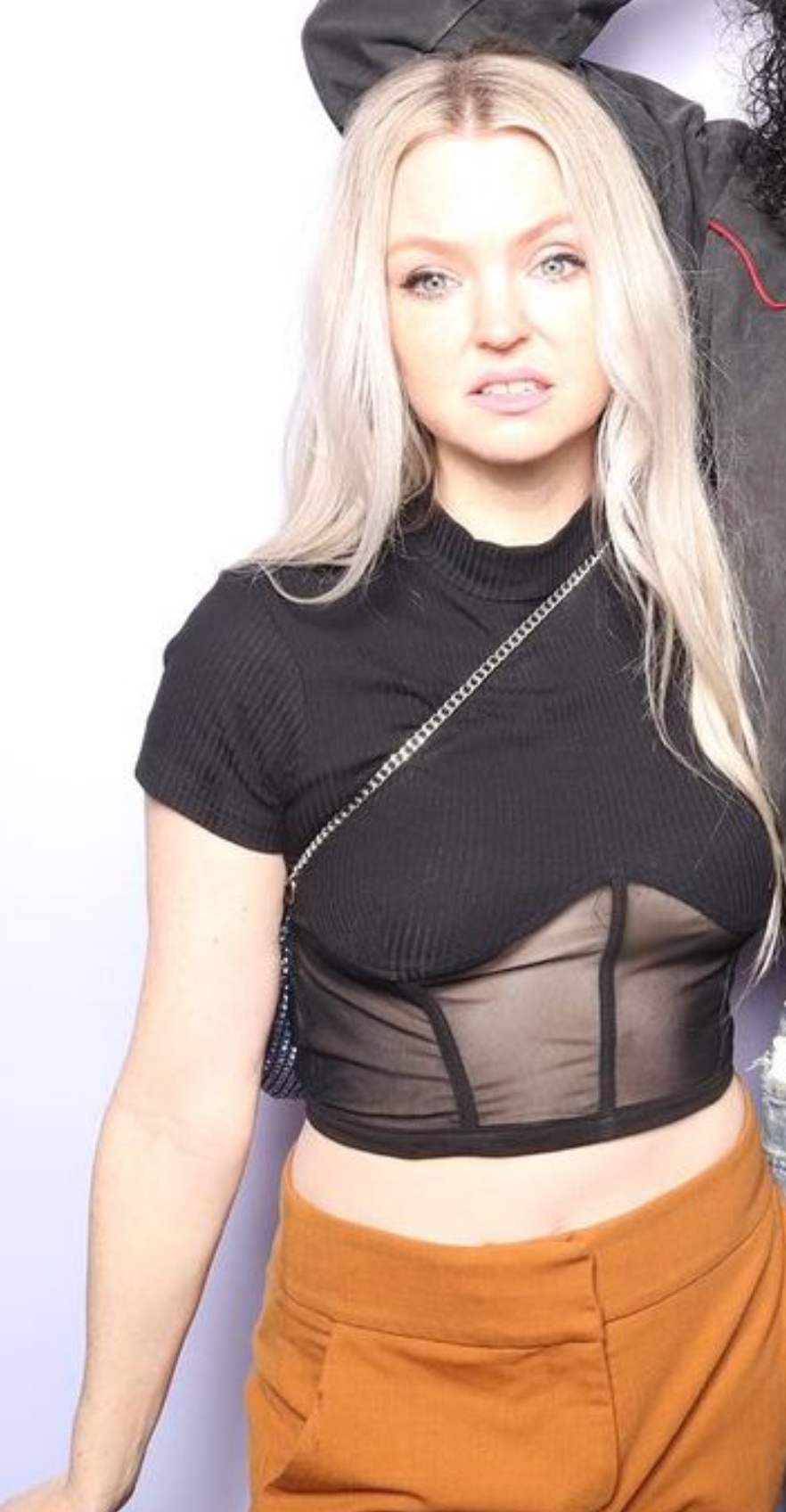
- Fairlie at Listening Party 2023
- Born: Kristin Louise Fairlie; 1982 or 1983 (age 43–44); Scarborough, Ontario, Canada
- Occupation: Actress
- Years active: 1991–present

Kristin Louise Fairlie (born April 22, 1982 or April 22, 1983) is a Canadian actress. In 1998, she won a Young Artist Award for Best Ensemble for her lead role in the Showtime original movie The Sweetest Gift. As a voice actress, Fairlie has voiced the roles of the title character in Little Bear, Bridgette in Total Drama, Carrie in Total Drama Presents: The Ridonculous Race and Emma in Stoked.

== Career ==
At the age of 11, Fairlie made her feature film debut in The Scarlet Letter . In 1999, she was among the winners of the Youth in Film Awards for Best Performance in a TV Movie/Pilot/Made-for-Video: Young Ensemble for her role in the Showtime television film The Sweetest Gift. Since then she appeared in the film The Virgin Suicides.

Fairlie voiced the supporting character of Nicole on the cartoon series Madeline. Since then she has lent her voice to many cartoons but she is best known as the voice of Little Bear in the animated series Little Bear and The Little Bear Movie, since she was 11 until 18. She starred as young Babar in the animated Feature film Babar: King of the Elephants, and appeared on the film's soundtrack. She is the voice of Bridgette on Total Drama, Emma on Stoked and Carrie in Total Drama Presents: The Ridonculous Race. Fairlie joined the cast of the Teletoon animated series Detentionaire. Other cartoons include Skyland, The Dating Guy, 6teen, Pearlie, Skatoony and Peg + Cat.

Fairlie has made guest appearances on TV series like Heartland, Murdoch Mysteries, The Eleventh Hour, and Goosebumps. Her guest-starring role on the series Flashpoint was noted by Kate Taylor of The Globe and Mail as "a chillingly convincing performance as a teenage bully". Fairlie appeared on the teen series renegadepress.com. Following the end of the series, she joined the cast of Instant Star to play Megan, the villain of the final season. The series was produced by Degrassi company Epitome Pictures for CTV and The N.

Fairlie starred in the made for television film Gracie's Choice opposite Kristen Bell, Anne Heche, and Diane Ladd. Fairlie later appeared in the award-winning indie comedy You Might as Well Live as untalented pop singer Stormy Blaze – her performance of Stormy's first single garnered her a mention by Variety's Dennis Harvey: "though the soundtrack standout (duly reprised under closing credits) is "Stormy Blaze," aka the sister’s hilariously heinous debut single." In 2011, Fairlie appears in a cameo in the indie comedy Moonpoint, and in the Julia Roberts produced film Jesus Henry Christ.

== Filmography ==
Film roles
Year	Title	Role	Notes
1993	Candles, Snow and Mistletoe	Unknown	
1995	The Scarlet Letter	Faith Stonehall	
1999	Babar: King of the Elephants	Young Babar	Voice role
1999	The Virgin Suicides	Amy Schraff	
2001	The Little Bear Movie	Little Bear	Voice role
2006	Repo! The Genetic Opera	Shilo Wallace	Short film
2008	Poker Night	Sybil	
2009	You Might as Well Live	Veronica Mutt / Stormy Blaze	
2011	Moon Point	Sheila	
2018	Tabaluga	Lilli	Voice role; International Version

Television roles
Year	Title	Role	Notes
1993	Madeline	Nicole	Voice role; recurring role
1994	Against Their Will: Women in Prison	Abby	TV movie
1995	The Silence of Adultery	Unknown	TV movie
1995–96	Road to Avonlea	Becky Lester	Recurring role; 10 episodes
1995–2001	Little Bear	Little Bear	Voice role; lead role; 65 episodes
1996	Goosebumps	Regina Barstow	Episode: "Go Eat Worms"
1996	Psi Factor: Chronicles of the Paranormal	Clara Preston	Episode: "UFO Duplication/Clara's Friend"
1997	The Defenders: Payback	Chris	TV movie
1998	The Sweetest Gift	Kate Martin	TV movie
1999	Vanished Without a Trace	Sarah	TV movie
1999	Wind at My Back	Ruby Trammel	Episodes: "The Crystal Skull", "The Strap"
2000	Redwall	Auma	Voice role (season 2)
2001	A Mother's Fight for Justice	Allie Stone	TV movie
2001	Within These Walls	Emily	TV movie
2003	Do or Die	Fatima	TV movie
2003	Wild Card	Sorority Pledge	Episode: "Hell Week"
2004	Gracie's Choice	Rose Carlton	TV movie
2004	Metropia	Cyanne	TV movie
2004–05	Train 48	Jesse	2 episodes
2005	The Dive from Clausen's Pier	Jamie	TV movie
2006	Renegadepress.com	Charlotte	Episodes: "The Retrospective", "The Dance"
2006	Doomstown	Kelly	TV movie
2007	Total Drama Island	Bridgette	Voice role; main role; 21 episodes
2008	Murdoch Mysteries	Petunia	Episode: "Power"
2008	6teen	Joanie	Voice role; episode: "Opposites Attack"
2008	Instant Star	Megan	5 episodes
2008	Flashpoint	Brianna	Episode: "Attention Shoppers"
2009–10	Total Drama Action	Bridgette / Kelsey	Voice role; recurring role; 9 episodes
2009	Heartland	Tara	Episode: "Do or Die"
2009–13	Stoked	Emma Mackenzie	Voice role; main role; 52 episodes
2009	The Dating Guy	Mandy (voice)	Episode: "Bonnie & Mark"
2010	Pearlie	Splish	Voice role; one episode
2010–11	Total Drama World Tour	Bridgette	Voice role; recurring role; 10 episodes
2010	Breathing Underwater	Kristen	
2010–13	Skatoony	Princess Nebula / Bridgette	Voice role; recurring role/ Episode; "Quizoo"
2011–15	Detentionaire	Ruby Kwee	Voice role
2012	Total Drama: Revenge of the Island	Bridgette	Voice role; episode; "Backstabbers Ahoy!"
2013–18	Peg + Cat	Juliet Capulet	Voice role
2013	Teenage Fairytale Dropouts	Trixie / Kelsi / Cally	Voice role
2015	Total Drama Presents: The Ridonculous Race	Carrie	Voice role; main role; 24 episodes
2018–23	Total DramaRama	Bridgette	Voice Role

Video game roles
Year	Title	Role	Notes
1999	Little Bear Preschool Thinking Adventures	Little Bear	Voice role
1999	Little Bear: Kindergarten Thinking Adventures	Little Bear	Voice role
2000	Little Bear Toddler Discovery Adventures	Little Bear	Voice role

Audiobooks
Year	Title	Role	Notes
2021	Phil Fly's First Flight	Narrator / Phil Fly	Voice role; lead role
