= Stephanie Anne Mills =

Canadian actress (born 1979)

- Born: March 7, 1979 (age 47); Edmonton, Alberta, Canada
- Occupation: Actress
- Years active: 1998–present

Stephanie Anne Mills (born March 7, 1979) is a Canadian actress.

== Biography ==
Mills was born in Edmonton, the youngest of three daughters to Margaret (née Achtymichuk), who was of Ukrainian descent and Harvey Mills, the president of Pacemaker Automotive. She aspired to be a singer, dancer and actress as a young child. In 2003, she had starred in Eloise at the Plaza with Julie Andrews. She does voice work for Total Drama as Lindsay and Katie, 6teen as Kirsten, Sidekick as Vana Glama, and Total Drama Presents: The Ridonculous Race as Kitty. She also has shown her acting roles in films and shows such as Rumours, The Safety of Objects, The Hoop Life, In Cold Blood and Gossip, among others.

== Filmography ==
=== Film ===
Year	Title	Role	Notes	Ref
1998	Urban Legend	Felicia		
2001	The Safety of Objects	Karen	Credited as Stephanie Mills	
2011	Mulroney: The Opera	Mila Mulroney	Working title was Politics Is Cruel: An Opera	
2012	Dex Hamilton and the Doomsday Swarm	Jenny 10		

=== Television ===
Year	Title	Role	Notes	Ref
2002–2003	Moville Mysteries	Veronica, Matilda Patella (voices)	Episodes: "Curse of the Mommies" and "Sold Your Soul For... What?"	
2003–2004	My Dad the Rock Star	Serenity Zilla (voice)	Main role	
2003	Hunger Point	Abby	TV movie	
2003	Eloise at the Plaza	Molly Daniels		
2003–2010	Franny's Feet	Lulu the Loon, additional voices		
2004	6teen	Kirsten (voice)		
2005	Interlude	Maiko Tamaki (voice)	English dub	
2006	Pandalian	Mi (voice)		
2006–2008	Growing Up Creepie	Carla (voice)		
2006	Miss Spider's Sunny Patch Friends	Dazzle	Episode: "Bug Talk"	
2006–2007	Ruby Gloom	Venus (voice; uncredited)		
2007	Total Drama Island	Lindsay, Katie (voices)		
2007	Roxy Hunter and the Mystery of the Moody Ghost	Rebecca		
2007	Iggy Arbuckle	Zoop, Art lover (voice)		
2007	Super Why!	Witch (voice)	Episode: "The Ghost Who Was Afraid of Halloween"	
2008-2009	Dex Hamilton: Alien Entomologist	Jenny 10 (voice)		
2008-2009	Bakugan Battle Brawlers	Chan Lee (voice)	English dub, Recurring role	
2009	Throwing Stones	Cindy Boshyk	TV pilot	
2009	Total Drama Action	Lindsay, Katie (voices)		
2009–2010	Bakugan Battle Brawlers: New Vestroia	Chan Lee (voice)	English dub	
2009-2011	Producing Parker	Helen McDonald, Mandy	2 episodes	
2010	Total Drama World Tour	Lindsay, Katie (voices)		
2010–2011	Bakugan: Gundalian Invaders	Princess Fabia Sheen (voice)	English dub, Main Cast	
2010–2013	Sidekick	Vana Glama (voice)	Main role	
2010, 2013	Skatoony	Katie (voice)	Episodes: "Xcqankly" and "CJ's Birthday"	
2011	My Big Big Friend	Daisy (voice)	Episode: Flower Power	
2011	Bakugan: Mechtanium Surge	Queen Fabia Sheen (voice)	English dub	
2012	Total Drama: Revenge of the Island	Lindsay (voice)	Episode: "Runaway Model"	
2012	Come Dance With Me	Demi Clayton	TV movie	
2012	Good God	Christine Adams		
2013	Total Drama All-Stars	Lindsay (voice)	Episode: "Heroes vs. Villains"	
2013	Seed	Zoey		
2014	Trucktown	Rosie (voice)	Recurring	
2014	Julius Jr.	Daphne (voice)	1 episode	
2015	Total Drama Presents: The Ridonculous Race	Kitty (voice)	22 episodes	
2016	Ranger Rob	Dakota (voice)	Main role, Seasons 1-2	
2020	Total DramaRama	Brightly (voice)	Episode: "Cartoon Realism"	
