= You Might as Well Live =

- Film poster
- Directed by: Simon Ennis
- Written by: Simon Ennis; Joshua Peace
- Produced by: Jonas Bell Pasht; Ari Lantos
- Starring: Joshua Peace; Michael Madsen; Stephen McHattie; Dov Tiefenbach; Kristen Hager; Liane Balaban; Greg Bryk; Dan Lett; Kristin Fairlie
- Cinematography: Jonathan Bensimon
- Edited by: Matt Lyon
- Music by: Don MacDonald
- Production companies: APB Pictures; E1 Entertainment; Serendipity Point Films
- Distributed by: E1 Entertainment
- Release dates: January 2009 (Sundance); August 28, 2009 (Canada)
- Running time: 78 minutes
- Country: Canada
- Language: English

You Might As Well Live is a 2009 Canadian comedy film directed by Simon Ennis. The film stars Joshua Peace as Robert Mutt, an unsuccessful slacker who has just been released from the hospital following a suicide attempt and is on a quest to transform his life after experiencing a vision of baseball legend Clinton Manitoba telling him that the three keys to success in life are to "get money, a girlfriend and a championship ring." The film’s title comes from the poem "Resumé", by Dorothy Parker.

== Cast ==
- Joshua Peace as Robert Mutt
- Michael Madsen as Clinton Manitoba
- Stephen McHattie as Fred Steinke
- Dov Tiefenbach as "Hershey" Hershenfield
- Kristen Hager as "Cookie" De Whitt
- Liane Balaban as Edna Kemperton
- Greg Bryk as "Dixie"
- Dan Lett as J. Amberson De Whitt
- Kristin Fairlie as Veronica Mutt / Stormy Blaze
- Tony Nappo as Eugene "Euge" Dillion
- Clark Johnson as George
- Martha Burns as Dr. Elizabeth
- Julian Richings as Dr. Pooseby
- Paula Boudreau as Winifred Steinke
- Boyd Banks as Uncle Casper
- Diane Gordon as Mildred Mutt
- Alessandro Costantini as Ari
- Cameron Ansell as Jonas
- Aron Tager as Rabbi Kirshenblat
- Kathryn Haggis as Greta
- Araxi Arslanian as The Connection
- Scott Anderson as Lester "The Registrar"
- Marcus Yau as Robert Jr.
- Nicole Arbour as Regina Manitoba

== Release ==
=== Critical reception ===
On review aggregation website Rotten Tomatoes, the film holds an approval rating of 67% based on 6 reviews, and an average rating of 5.5/10.

Variety's Dennis Harvey gave the film a mostly positive review, remarking that the film was "a promising first-feature collaboration for director Simon Ennis and co-writer/star Joshua Peace", and noted that "[w]hile it's seldom uproarious, there's steady amusement". Katherine Monk of the Edmonton Journal called the film an "overlong comedy sketch", but opined that it was redeemed by strong acting.

=== Accolades ===
The film's make-up team, Robbi O'Quinn and Leanne Morrison, received a Genie Award nomination for Best Makeup at the 30th Genie Awards.
