= Total Drama Island =

Canadian animated comedy television series

- Starring: Christian Potenza; Clé Bennett; Scott McCord; Megan Fahlenbock; Rachel Wilson; Drew Nelson; Novie Edwards; Dan Petronijevic; Stephanie Anne Mills; Kristen Fairlee; Katie Crown; Brian Froud; Emilie Barlow; Lauren Lipson; Sarah Gaddon; Peter Oldring; Adam Reid; Carter Hayden; Julia Chantrey
- No. of episodes: 27

Release
- Original network: Teletoon (Canada); Cartoon Network (USA)
- Original release: July 8, 2007 – November 29, 2008

Season chronology
- Next → Action

Total Drama Island (sometimes shortened to TDI) is the first season of the Total Drama series, a Canadian animated television series created by Tom McGillis and Jennifer Pertsch. The series premiered in Canada on Teletoon on July 8, 2007, and later in the US on Cartoon Network on June 5, 2008. The season has 26 episodes, each 22 minutes in duration, as well as a special 44-minute season finale.

== Plot ==
A grand view of the main setting used in this season (which is artificially recreated in the next season). The island is also used in the fourth and fifth seasons (which leads to its destruction).

Total Drama Island is set in the fictional titular reality show, which follows the competition of twenty-two unsuspecting and unwitting campers at Camp Wawanakwa, the most rundown, insect-infested, disgusting island in an unspecified area in Muskoka, Ontario. The campers participate in competitions and challenges that get more insane and dangerous each week to avoid being voted off the island by their fellow campers and teammates. At the end of the series, the winning contestant is said to receive C$100,000 (US$73,129.00). The competition is hosted by Chris McLean, assisted by the camp's chef, Chef Hatchet, who is also Chris's best friend despite being mistreated at times. Egotistical and immoral, unless something affects him legally, Chris places the show's contestants in various life-threatening challenges.

At the beginning of the season, the campers are placed into two groups of eleven, the "Screaming Gophers" and the "Killer Bass". In each episode, the teams participate in a challenge, in which one or more campers can win invincibility for their team. The losing team is called to the campfire that night, where the losing team vote one of their members off the island. The camper with the most votes is eliminated from the competition. At this campfire, Chris passes out marshmallows to the campers who have not been voted off, while the one who does not get a marshmallow must walk down the Dock of Shame to the Boat of Losers, which will take them away from the island (which is actually a hotel/resort quite close to the island with a pool and luxuries) and they will "never, never, never, ever, ever, ever, come back, ever" according to Chris (this was proved to be a lie in Episode 15, "No Pain, No Game", when he brought Eva and Izzy back into the game).

In Episode 14, the teams are disbanded, so it is every camper for themselves, after which the challenges continue; the winner of each challenge then only receives invincibility for themselves, whereupon the rest of the campers vote one camper without invincibility off the island (with a few exceptions where elimination is determined by the challenge itself). This process of elimination continues until two players remain where they are then subject to a final contest.

Total Drama Island is a parody of the reality show Survivor. McLean is very similar to Survivor host Jeff Probst. This is the first season in which the winner does not get to keep the money, due to it being eaten by a shark in the episode "Total Drama, Drama, Drama, Drama Island". The season finale, "The Very Last Episode, Really!" had two endings that changed whether Gwen or Owen won the season, with the winner depending on the country the season aired in. This tradition of two endings for each finalist was kept for the rest of the original series' run, and its spin off The Ridonculous Race. The following special, "Total Drama Drama Drama Drama Island" and season, Total Drama Action had alternate versions to acknowledge a specific ending in their episodes, but previous winners were simply never directly acknowledged following Action.

== Episodes ==
Total Drama Island premiered on July 8, 2007, on the Teletoon channel. This season has 26 episodes, each 22 minutes long, and two special episodes. It was the third Cartoon Network show outside of Adult Swim and Toonami to have the U.S. rating of either "TV-PG" or "TV-PG-D", and a parental-guidance warning after every commercial break and at the beginning of the show (the first two being Sunday Pants and IGPX). Its rating in Canada was initially "G"; current broadcasts are rated "PG".

No. overall	No. in season	Title	Written by	Canadian air date	U.S. air date	Prod. code
1	1	"Not-So Happy Campers – Part 1"	Jennifer Pertsch	July 8, 2007	June 5, 2008	101
In the series premiere, twenty-two campers arrive at the run-down Camp Wawanakwa, where they will spend eight weeks with Chris McLean as the host of the competition. The campers are split into two teams: the Screaming Gophers and the Killer Bass. The Screaming Gophers consist of Noah, Justin, Katie, Cody, Beth, Trent, Lindsay, Leshawna, Heather, Owen, and Gwen. The Killer Bass are Ezekiel, Eva, Tyler, Izzy, Sadie, Courtney, Harold, Bridgette, DJ, Geoff, and Duncan. The campers then prepare to compete in their first challenge: jumping off a 1,000 ft. tall cliff into shark-infested waters. Main characters: All 22 contestants.
2	2	"Not So Happy Campers – Part 2"	Jennifer Pertsch	July 8, 2007	June 12, 2008	102
The two teams face off in their very first challenge: jumping off a thousand foot cliff into a small safe zone surrounded by shark-infested waters, then building a hot tub out of wood. Katie and Izzy swap teams so Katie could be on the same team as Sadie, while Heather and Leshawna start up a fierce rivalry. The Screaming Gophers work well together while the Killer Bass struggle to cooperate. Courtney finds herself on the chopping block for her overbearing attitude and refusing to jump into the water, but her team instead votes out Ezekiel following his series of sexist remarks. Main Characters: All 22 contestants. Elimination: Ezekiel
3	3	"The Big Sleep"	Nicole Demerse	July 15, 2007	June 19, 2008	103
The two teams compete in a twenty kilometer race and a buffet-eating contest, only to discover that their real challenge is an "Awake-A-Thon" to test who can stay awake the longest. Gwen and Trent start to bond while Heather forms the first alliance with Lindsay and Beth. Gwen wins the challenge for the Gophers. The Bass vote off the short-tempered Eva after she accuses her teammates of stealing her MP3 player, which in actuality was stolen by Heather to get the Bass to vote off their strongest competitor. Main Characters: Owen, Gwen, Trent, Eva, and Heather. Elimination: Eva
4	4	"Dodgebrawl"	Alex Nussbaum	July 22, 2007	June 26, 2008	104
The two teams participate in a five-round game of dodgeball. The Gophers dominate initially thanks to Owen and Cody displaying surprising skill - that is, until Duncan is forced by Courtney to take charge, which turns the tides of the game. Ultimately, Harold wins the tiebreaking bout in a one-on-one showdown versus Owen, while Noah is eliminated due to being nothing but sarcastic and refusing to help his team. Main Characters: Noah, Lindsay, and Heather. Elimination: Noah
5	5	"Not Quite Famous"	Jennifer Cowan	July 29, 2007	July 3, 2008	105
The two teams participate in a talent show, with the Gophers selecting Justin, Trent, and Heather to compete while the Bass initially choose DJ, Courtney, and Geoff. The rivalry between Gwen and Heather intensifies after Heather reads Gwen's diary aloud before the other contestants, and the viewing public, revealing Gwen has a crush on one of her teammates. After Courtney sustains an injury, Bridgette falls ill, and Geoff breaks his skateboard, the Bass turn to Harold, who wins the contest by beatboxing. Heather avoids elimination by convincing her teammates to vote out Justin. Main Characters: Gwen, Lindsay, Justin, and Heather. Elimination: Justin
6	6	"The Sucky Outdoors"	Jennifer Pertsch	August 5, 2007	July 10, 2008	106
The two teams must spend an entire night alone in the woods. Katie and Sadie get lost in the woods and start a fight that jeopardizes their friendship. Izzy, meanwhile, dresses as a bear and pranks her fellow Gophers. By virtue of Katie and Sadie getting lost and failing to return to camp in time, the Bass lose the challenge; with Katie and Sadie they vote to eliminate Katie as a result. Main Characters: Katie and Sadie. Elimination: Katie
7	7	"Phobia Factor"	Shelley Scarrow	August 12, 2007	July 17, 2008	107
A discussion of fears evolves into a fear-facing challenge, thanks to some eavesdroppers. Most of the campers conquer their fears, but a few others don't fare as well. Courtney finds herself on the chopping block once again after bragging about how she's not afraid of anything, but ultimately failing to overcome her fear of green jelly and costing her team the challenge. However, Tyler is ultimately voted off for being too afraid to face his fear of chickens. Main Characters: Tyler and Courtney. Elimination: Tyler
8	8	"Up the Creek"	Alex Nussbaum	August 19, 2007	July 24, 2008	108
The teams embark on a canoe venture to the nearby Boney Island, which Chris warns them is haunted. Beth, having missed Chris' instructions, rushes to join her team. Upon arrival to the island, the teams must build a fire, then race back to camp. Cody, having deduced that Gwen and Trent like each other, arranges to have them canoe back to camp with each other. Geoff helps DJ overcome his hydrophobia while DJ helps Geoff get closer to Bridgette. Beth takes a tiki doll from the island as a souvenir. Thanks to DJ taking Izzy's advice and pushing his team's canoes, the Bass narrowly edge out the Gophers in the race to win. At the elimination ceremony, Izzy is intercepted by an RCMP helicopter and flees from the island before the last marshmallow can be awarded. Main Characters: Cody and Izzy. Elimination: Izzy
9	9	"Paintball Deer Hunter"	Shelley Scarrow	August 26, 2007	July 31, 2008	109
The two teams compete in a paintball competition, with members of each team divided into "hunters" and "deer". Beth stands up for herself and mutinies from Heather's alliance. The ensuing barrage of friendly fire costs the Gophers their second challenge in a row. Cody gets mauled by a bear, and his fellow Gophers vote him out as a result. Main Characters: Cody, Beth, and Heather. Elimination: Cody
10	10	"If You Can't Take the Heat..."	Alex Ganetakos	September 2, 2007	August 7, 2008	110
The two teams compete in a cooking challenge. Duncan, Geoff and DJ incessantly tease and pick on Harold after he leaves his dirty underwear lying around their cabin. Meanwhile, Leshawna and Heather's conflict reaches a boiling point. The Screaming Gophers end up locking Heather in the fridge. The dysfunctional Gophers lose their third challenge in a row, but not before learning of the tiki doll Beth brought back from the cursed Boney Island. In the end, Beth is voted off the island for cursing her team. Main Character: Heather. Elimination: Beth
11	11	"Who Can You Trust?"	Alex Nussbaum	September 9, 2007	August 14, 2008	111
The two teams are put to the ultimate tests in trust, pitting together mortal enemies and potential relationships. DJ relies on Geoff to take care of his pet bunny, but Geoff fails to complete his duties. But, thanks to an unexpected favour from Duncan, the rabbit is fine - as far as they know. The Bass eliminate Sadie after she knocks Courtney unconscious during the challenge. Main Characters: ??? Elimination: Sadie
12	12	"Basic Straining"	Jennifer Pertsch	September 16, 2007	August 21, 2008	112
Chef Hatchet takes charge of the challenge, and subjects the campers to a grueling boot camp. Duncan repeatedly taunts and disobeys Chef, leading to his solitary confinement in the boat house. Courtney goes to check on him, and the two promptly embark on a rule-breaking crusade which ignites a romance between them. The Bass lose the challenge and Harold, fed up with Duncan's persistent bullying of him, rigs the votes to eliminate a bewildered Courtney. Main Characters: Duncan and Courtney. Elimination: Courtney
13	13	"X-Treme Torture"	Erika Strobel	September 23, 2007	August 28, 2008	113
Chris has the contestants paired off for the next immunity challenge, a series of extreme sports challenges. Gwen and Bridgette begin a dispute when they find a love poem that someone wrote for Leshawna, believing it instead to be written for them by their respective love interests, but later make amends. During the final part of the challenge, Heather loses her top and has her breasts exposed. This breaks Harold's concentration and causes him to lose the challenge. The Killer Bass elect to vote him off, and he reveals that he wrote the love poems to Leshawna, getting a kiss from her before his exit. Main Characters: Bridgette and Gwen. Elimination: Harold
14	14	"Brunch of Disgustingness"	Alex Nussbaum	September 30, 2007	September 4, 2008	114
The Bass and Gopher teams are disbanded, and the campers are divided into a five-on-five battle of the sexes; a nine-course meal consisting of Chris and Chef's diabolically concocted "dishes." Both sides struggle to work together at various stages, but the five male competitors win on the back of Owen's insatiable appetite. They enjoy a weekend away from camp at a spa resort, while the new girls' alliance quickly splinters.
15	15	"No Pain, No Game"	Erika Strobel	October 7, 2007	September 11, 2008	115
The two teams are officially dissolved and Izzy and Eva both return to the game. The campers then face an excruciating torture challenge with individual immunity at stake for the first time. Leshawna wins the challenge while Eva is voted off again for her temper. Main Characters: Eva and Heather. Elimination: Eva (2nd time)
16	16	"Search & Do Not Destroy"	Alex Nussbaum	October 14, 2007	September 18, 2008	116
The campers embark on a scavenger hunt for keys that will unlock corresponding treasure chests, only one of which contains immunity. Heather, eager to stoke tension, kisses Trent in front of Gwen, stunting their long-building romance. Leshawna attempts to rally the other contestants to vote Heather out of the competition, but when Heather wins immunity, they eliminate Trent instead, but not before he and Gwen make up. Main Characters: Trent, Heather, Leshawna, and Gwen. Elimination: Trent
17	17	"Hide & Be Sneaky"	Tom McGillis	October 21, 2007	September 25, 2008	117
The campers play an extreme game of hide and seek with Chef, who hunts them down one by one with a huge water gun. Duncan forms a guys' alliance, and brings Owen, Geoff and DJ aboard. With Heather and Leshawna winning immunity, he convinces them to vote off Bridgette. Before she leaves, Geoff and Bridgette confess their feelings for each other, but are unable to kiss due to her getting sprayed by a skunk in the challenge. Main Characters: Geoff and Bridgette. Elimination: Bridgette
18	18	"That's Off the Chain!"	Erika Strobel	October 28, 2007	October 2, 2008	118
The campers build bikes from scratch, and race them in a romping motocross adventure. Heather betrays Lindsay on her way to winning the instant-elimination challenge, which leads to an explosive rebuttal from Lindsay on her way out. Main Characters: Lindsay and Heather. Elimination: Lindsay
19	19	"Hook, Line & Screamer"	Erika Strobel	November 4, 2007	October 9, 2008	119
The campers are tasked with surviving a real-life horror movie. A "psycho killer" picks them off one by one with the exception of Duncan and Gwen. During the challenge, Owen grows closer with Izzy, but ends up in hot water when he throws her to the killer. However, the challenge takes a frightening twist when Gwen encounters a real killer. In the end, DJ is eliminated by Chris for performing the worst in the challenge. Main Characters: Owen and Izzy/Duncan and Gwen Elimination: DJ
20	20	"Wawanakwa Gone Wild!"	Shelley Scarrow	November 11, 2007	October 16, 2008	120
The campers square off in a challenge where they must trap a certain animal. Gwen gets a delicious meal as a reward for catching her animal first, while Duncan and Heather form a temporary alliance. Chef and Heather get tranquilized by Izzy while Owen ends up having very bad luck. This all leads up to Izzy getting voted off once again. Main Characters: Duncan, Heather, and Izzy. Elimination: Izzy (2nd time)
21	21	"Trial by Tri-Armed Triathlon"	Shelley Scarrow	November 18, 2007	October 23, 2008	121
The final six campers are split into three pairs and must compete in various challenges using teamwork. Some groups have trouble working together, while Gwen and Duncan respectively open up to Geoff and Leshawna; Gwen is reticent about not fitting in, while Duncan reveals he's much kinder-hearted than he portrays. Owen reaches his breaking point with Heather when she insults Izzy. Once the triathlon is finished and none of the teams win, it is revealed that nobody is safe. With all six players eligible for the Dock of Shame, Geoff is eliminated. Main Characters: Gwen and Geoff. Elimination: Geoff
22	22	"Haute Camp-Ture" "After the Dock of Shame"	Alex Nussbaum	November 25, 2007	October 30, 2008	122
Chris visits the luxurious Playa Des Losers and catches up with the previously eliminated contestants. After learning their thoughts on the final five, he reveals a shocking twist in which the eliminated contestants will vote off the next camper. Leshawna is inadvertently eliminated after a series of hijinx. Elimination: Leshawna
23	23	"Camp Castaways"	Erika Strobel	December 2, 2007	November 6, 2008	123
After a huge flood, the campers float away to a "deserted island" and try to fend for themselves while dealing with the dangers there, as well as enduring each other. Meanwhile, the hosts are having a day of relaxation on the same island. While the final four are separated at first, they eventually wind up back together again and, after Owen's mental breakdown, his new "friend", Mr. Coconut, is "eliminated" by Chris.
24	24	"Are We There, Yeti?"	Alex Nussbaum	December 9, 2007	November 13, 2008	124
The campers wake up in the middle of the wilderness. The challenge is to race back to camp and tag a totem pole. The boys are on one team while the girls are on the other. Since Chris is off for the day, Chef takes over as host. In the end, Owen's eating habits distract him and allow the girls to win the challenge, resulting in Duncan's elimination. Elimination: Duncan Note: During the beginning of the episode, Chef is seen splitting Mr. Coconut in half with a knife.
25	25	"I Triple Dog Dare You!"	Erika Strobel	December 16, 2007	November 20, 2008	125
The final three campers must participate in a series of dares invented by the eliminated campers, with the first camper to refuse a dare being automatically eliminated. Gwen and Owen form an alliance to take down Heather. Eventually, Heather fails a dare on a technicality and loses all of her hair and the competition, allowing Owen and Gwen to move on to the final challenge... Elimination: Heather
26	26	"The Very Last Episode, Really!"	Jennifer Pertsch	January 4, 2008	December 11, 2008	126
Gwen and Owen participate in one last challenge for the grand prize, with all of the previously eliminated campers returning to watch. After a race filled with sabotage, heartbreak, and brownies, Owen wins the grand prize and Gwen goes home with a "consolation prize". In the alternative version, Gwen wins. Runner-Up: Gwen/Owen Winner: Owen/Gwen (Note: Owen was confirmed to be the canon winner by both Chris and Priya in episode 20 of Part 2 of the reboot of Total Drama Island. Owen's ending also aired originally in Canada, the series' country of origin.)
27	27	"Total Drama Drama Drama Drama Island"	Jennifer Pertsch and Tom McGillis	November 29, 2008	December 18, 2008	127
Chris has one final challenge for all of the contestants, forcing them to form their own respective teams, and participate in an all-out, no-rules hunt for one million dollars! However, after a series of unpredictable and out-of-control events, the money is eaten by a shark and there is only one way to settle this tie.

Source for list:

=== Episode finale variations ===
For every season, the show's producers create two alternate endings for the final episode, such that the winner seen in one country's broadcasts is the runner-up in other countries (and vice versa) where the show airs. Owen is the original winner in Canada, but he is also the winner in Australia, Brazil, Bulgaria, Croatia, Denmark, France, Hungary, India, Indonesia, Ireland, Israel, Italy, Latin America (Cartoon Network), the Middle East, the Netherlands, New Zealand, the Philippines, Poland (Netflix), Portugal, Russia, Serbia, Singapore, Spain, South Africa, Turkey, United Kingdom, and the United States. Gwen is the original runner-up in Canada, but she is shown as the winner in Brazil (Boomerang and TBS), Latin America (Boomerang and TBS), Norway, Poland, Romania and Sweden.

== Characters ==
The primary cast of Total Drama Island. Top: DJ, Duncan, Tyler, Harold, Geoff, and Heather Standing: Lindsay, Leshawna, Eva, Justin, Owen, Noah, Trent, Gwen, and Cody Sitting: Izzy, Bridgette, Courtney, Katie, Sadie, Ezekiel, and Beth

=== Staff ===
Character	Voice actor	Description
Chris McLean	Christian Potenza	Chris is the host of the series.
Chef Hatchet	Clé Bennett	Chef is the cook and Chris' assistant for challenges.

=== Contestants ===
There are 22 original contestants who competed in Total Drama Island. They are Beth, Bridgette, Cody, Courtney, DJ, Duncan, Eva, Ezekiel, Geoff, Gwen, Harold, Heather, Izzy, Justin, Katie, Leshawna, Lindsay, Noah, Owen, Sadie, Trent, and Tyler. Many of the characters return in later seasons either as contestants or as guests.

List of Total Drama Island contestants
Contestant	Label	Voice actor	Team				Finish	
Contestant	Label	Voice actor	Original	Swapped	Battle of the sexes	Merged	Placement	Episode
Ezekiel	The Home-Schooled Guy	Peter Oldring	Killer Bass	Killer Bass			1st eliminated	2
Eva (Returned to game)			Killer Bass	Killer Bass			2nd eliminated	3
Noah	The Schemer	Carter Hayden	Screaming Gophers	Screaming Gophers			3rd eliminated	4
Justin	The Eye Candy	Adam Reid	Screaming Gophers	Screaming Gophers			4th eliminated	5
Katie	The Sweet Girl	Stephanie Anne Mills	Screaming Gophers	Killer Bass			5th eliminated	6
Tyler	The Jock	Peter Oldring	Killer Bass	Killer Bass			6th eliminated	7
Izzy (Returned to game)			Killer Bass	Screaming Gophers			7th eliminated (Left)	8
Cody	The Geek	Peter Oldring	Screaming Gophers	Screaming Gophers			8th eliminated	9
Beth	The Wannabe	Sarah Gadon (Note: Sarah Gadon was credited as Sarah Gaddon in the closing credits.)	Screaming Gophers	Screaming Gophers			9th eliminated	10
Sadie	The Sweet Girl's Friend	Lauren Lipson	Killer Bass	Killer Bass			10th eliminated	11
Courtney	The Type-A	Emilie-Claire Barlow	Killer Bass	Killer Bass			11th eliminated	12
Harold	The Dweeb	Brian Froud	Killer Bass	Killer Bass			12th eliminated	13
Eva	The Female Bully	Julia Chantrey	Killer Bass	Killer Bass		None	13th eliminated	15
Trent	The Cool Guy	Scott McCord	Screaming Gophers	Screaming Gophers	Guys	None	14th eliminated	16
Bridgette	The Surfer Girl	Kristin Fairlie	Killer Bass	Killer Bass	Girls	None	15th eliminated	17
Lindsay	The Dumb Princess	Stephanie Anne Mills	Screaming Gophers	Screaming Gophers	Girls	None	16th eliminated	18
DJ	The Brickhouse with a Heart	Clé Bennett	Killer Bass	Killer Bass	Guys	None	17th eliminated	19
Izzy	The Psycho Hose Beast	Katie Crown	Killer Bass	Screaming Gophers		None	18th eliminated	20
Geoff	The Party Guy	Dan Petronijevic	Killer Bass	Killer Bass	Guys	None	19th eliminated	21
Leshawna	The Sister with 'Tude	Novie Edwards	Screaming Gophers	Screaming Gophers	Girls	None	20th eliminated	22
Duncan	The Delinquent	Drew Nelson	Killer Bass	Killer Bass	Guys	None	21st eliminated	24
Heather	The Queen Bee	Rachel Wilson	Screaming Gophers	Screaming Gophers	Girls	None	22nd eliminated	25
Gwen	The Loner	Megan Fahlenbock	Screaming Gophers	Screaming Gophers	Girls	None	Runner-up	26
Owen	The Funniest Guy Around	Scott McCord	Screaming Gophers	Screaming Gophers	Guys	None	Winner	26

== Season summary ==
Total Drama Island Returns season summary
Episode			Original airdate		Challenge winner(s)	Eliminated	
No.	Title	Written by	Canada	United States	Challenge winner(s)	Team	Contestant
1	"Not So Happy Campers- Part 1	Jennifer Pertsch	July 8, 2007	June 5, 2008	None		
2	"Not So Happy Campers- Part 2	Jennifer Pertsch	July 8, 2007	June 12, 2008	Screaming Gophers	Killer Bass	Ezekiel
3	"The Big Sleep"	Nicole Demerse	July 15, 2007	June 19, 2008	Screaming Gophers	Killer Bass	Eva
4	"Dodgebrawl"	Alex Nussbaum	July 22, 2007	June 26, 2008	Killer Bass	Screaming Gophers	Noah
5	"Not Quite Famous"	Jennifer Cowan	July 29, 2007	July 3, 2008	Killer Bass	Screaming Gophers	Justin
6	"The Sucky Outdoors"	Jennifer Pertsch	Aug. 5, 2007	July 10, 2008	Screaming Gophers	Killer Bass	Katie
7	"Phobia Factor"	Shelley Scarrow	Aug. 12, 2007	July 17, 2008	Screaming Gophers	Killer Bass	Tyler
8	"Up the Creek"	Alex Nussbaum	Aug. 17, 2007	July 24, 2008	Killer Bass	Screaming Gophers	Izzy
9	"Paintball Deer Hunter"	Shelley Scarrow	Aug. 26, 2007	Jul. 31, 2008	Killer Bass	Screaming Gophers	Cody
10	"If You Can't Take the Heat..."	Alex Ganetakos	Sept. 2, 2007	Aug. 7, 2008	Killer Bass	Screaming Gophers	Beth
11	"Who Can You Trust?"	Alex Nussbaum	Sept. 9, 2007	Aug. 14, 2008	Screaming Gophers	Killer Bass	Sadie
12	"Basic Straining"	Jennifer Pertsch	Sept. 16, 2007	Aug. 21, 2008	Screaming Gophers	Killer Bass	Courtney
13	"X-Treme Torture"	Erika Strobel	Sept. 23, 2007	Aug. 28, 2008	Screaming Gophers	Killer Bass	Harold
14	"Brunch of Disgustingness"	Alex Nussbaum	Sept. 30, 2007	Sept. 4, 2008	DJ, Duncan, Geoff, Owen, & Trent (Guys' Team)	None	
15	"No Pain, No Game"	Erika Strobel	Oct. 7, 2007	Sept. 11, 2008	Leshawna	None	Eva
16	"Search and Do Not Destroy"	Alex Nussbaum	Oct. 14, 2007	Sept. 18, 2008	Heather	None	Trent
17	"Hide and Be Sneaky"	Tom McGillis	Oct. 21, 2007	Sept. 25, 2008	Heather & Leshawna	None	Bridgette
18	"That's Off the Chain!"	Erika Strobel	Oct. 28, 2007	Oct. 2, 2008	Heather	None	Lindsay
19	"Hook, Line, and Screamer"	Erika Strobel	Nov. 4, 2007	Oct. 9, 2008	Gwen	None	DJ
20	"Wawanakwa Gone Wild!"	Shelley Scarrow	Nov. 11, 2007	Oct. 16, 2008	Gwen	None	Izzy
21	"Trial by Tri-Armed Triathlon"	Shelley Scarrow	Nov. 18, 2007	Oct. 23, 2008	Tie	None	Geoff
22	"Haute Camp-ture"	Alex Nussbaum	Nov. 25, 2007	Oct. 30, 2008	None	None	Leshawna
23	"Camp Castaways"	Erika Strobel	Dec. 2, 2007	Nov. 6, 2008	None		
24	"Are We There Yeti?"	Alex Nussbaum	Dec. 9, 2007	Nov. 13, 2008	Gwen & Heather	None	Duncan
25	"I Triple Dog Dare You!"	Erika Strobel	Dec. 16, 2007	Nov. 20, 2008	Gwen & Owen	None	Heather
N/A	"Total Drama Island Recap" (CA) "TDI Rundown" (US)	None Matt McElhannon	Jan. 4, 2008	Dec. 4, 2008	Recap		
26	"The Very Last Episode, Really!"	Jennifer Pertsch	Jan. 4, 2008	Dec. 11, 2008	Owen (Note: Owen was confirmed to be the canon winner by both Chris and Priya in episode 20 of Part 2 of the reboot of Total Drama Island.)	None	Gwen
27	"Total Drama, Drama, Drama, Drama Island"	Jennifer Pertsch & Tom McGillis	Nov. 29, 2008	Dec. 18, 2008	Special		

== Elimination table ==
Contestant	Episode																										
Contestant	1–2	3	4	5	6	7	8	9	10	11	12	13	14	15	16	17	18	19	20		21	22	23	24	25	26	27
Owen	WIN	WIN	SAFE	SAFE	WIN	WIN	SAFE	SAFE	SAFE	WIN	WIN	WIN	WIN	SAFE	SAFE	BTM3	SAFE	SAFE	SAFE		SAFE	SAFE	BTM2	BTM2	WIN	WINNER	Yes
Gwen	WIN	WIN	SAFE	SAFE	WIN	WIN	SAFE	SAFE	SAFE	WIN	WIN	WIN	—N/a	SAFE	SAFE	SAFE	SAFE	WIN	WIN	BTM2	BTM2	SAFE	SAFE	WIN	WIN	RUNNER-UP	Yes
Heather	WIN	WIN	SAFE	BTM2	WIN	WIN	SAFE	BTM2	BTM2	WIN	WIN	WIN	—N/a	BTM2	WIN	WIN	WIN	SAFE	SAFE		SAFE	SAFE	SAFE	WIN	OUT		Yes
Duncan	SAFE	SAFE	WIN	WIN	SAFE	SAFE	WIN	WIN	WIN	SAFE	SAFE	BTM2	WIN	SAFE	SAFE	BTM2	SAFE	SAFE	SAFE		SAFE	SAFE	SAFE	OUT			Yes
Leshawna	WIN	WIN	SAFE	SAFE	WIN	WIN	SAFE	SAFE	SAFE	WIN	WIN	WIN	—N/a	WIN	SAFE	WIN	SAFE	SAFE	SAFE		SAFE	OUT					Yes
Geoff	SAFE	SAFE	WIN	WIN	SAFE	SAFE	WIN	WIN	WIN	SAFE	SAFE	SAFE	WIN	SAFE	SAFE	SAFE	SAFE	SAFE	SAFE		OUT						Yes
Izzy	WIN	WIN	SAFE	SAFE	WIN	WIN	LEFT							SAFE	SAFE	SAFE	SAFE	SAFE	OUT								Yes
DJ	SAFE	SAFE	WIN	WIN	SAFE	SAFE	WIN	WIN	WIN	SAFE	SAFE	SAFE	WIN	SAFE	SAFE	SAFE	SAFE	OUT									Yes
Lindsay	WIN	WIN	BTM2	SAFE	WIN	WIN	BTM2	SAFE	SAFE	WIN	WIN	WIN	—N/a	SAFE	SAFE	SAFE	OUT										Yes
Bridgette	SAFE	SAFE	WIN	WIN	SAFE	BTM3	WIN	WIN	WIN	SAFE	SAFE	SAFE	—N/a	SAFE	SAFE	OUT											Yes
Trent	WIN	WIN	SAFE	SAFE	WIN	WIN	SAFE	SAFE	SAFE	WIN	WIN	WIN	WIN	SAFE	OUT												Yes
Eva	SAFE	OUT												OUT													No
Harold	SAFE	BTM2	WIN	WIN	SAFE	SAFE	WIN	WIN	WIN	BTM2	BTM2	OUT															Yes
Courtney	BTM2	SAFE	WIN	WIN	SAFE	BTM2	WIN	WIN	WIN	SAFE	OUT																No
Sadie	SAFE	SAFE	WIN	WIN	BTM2	SAFE	WIN	WIN	WIN	OUT																	No
Beth	WIN	WIN	SAFE	SAFE	WIN	WIN	SAFE	SAFE	OUT																		Yes
Cody	WIN	WIN	SAFE	SAFE	WIN	WIN	SAFE	OUT																			No
Tyler	SAFE	SAFE	WIN	WIN	SAFE	OUT																					No
Katie	SAFE	SAFE	WIN	WIN	OUT																						No
Justin	WIN	WIN	SAFE	OUT																							Yes
Noah	WIN	WIN	OUT																								No
Ezekiel	OUT																										No

== Production ==
=== As Camp TV ===
Development began in 2003, as a project called Camp TV. A later pitch was made in 2004; both pitches were eventually rejected.

On February 15, 2006, it was announced that Tom McGillis and Jennifer Pertsch were working on a project called Camp TV. According to Tom McGillis, Fresh TV was approached by Teletoon to create the show.

=== As Total Drama ===
==== Development ====
On March 27, 2006, the project was renamed Total Drama Island and the franchise was also renamed Total Drama. Production began in June 2006.

==== Writing ====
Tom McGillis and Jennifer Pertsch studied what tweens liked (and disliked) about reality television shows in the writing process. McGillis said that they used a "countrywide online research project" to determine what 9-to-14 year olds were watching. It was found that Canadian tweens enjoyed watching Fear Factor, Survivor, The Amazing Race, American Idol, and Canadian Idol.

==== Animation ====
The season was animated at Elliott Animation and was directed by Todd Kauffman and Mark Thornton. Fresh TV partners McGillis, Pertsch, Elliott and Irving produced the series. The budget for the series was US$8,000,000. It was animated in Flash, at Elliott Animation's studio in Toronto. All the characters were designed by Kauffman.

==== Confidentiality agreement ====
Every cast and crew member on Total Drama Island had to sign a confidentiality agreement not to disclose who the winner was.

==== Casting ====
Voice actors from the series 6teen have lent their voices for Total Drama Island.

Christian Potenza, who played the character Jude on 6teen, played the role of host Chris McLean. Potenza said that the best part of the job was that his character could not be voted off the show.

Emilie-Claire Barlow plays a recurring role as Chrissy on 6teen and plays Courtney on Total Drama Island. Barlow stated that Courtney was her favourite character that she had ever played.

Other voice actors from 6teen include Julia Chantrey as Eva; Drew Nelson (Kai) as Duncan; Megan Fahlenbock (Jen) as Gwen; Adam Reid (Wayne) as Justin; Stephanie Anne Mills (Kirsten) as Lindsay and Katie; Rachel Wilson (Melinda Wilson) as Heather; and Scott McCord (Stone) as Owen and Trent.

== Reception ==
=== Ratings ===
Carole Bonneau, the Vice President of Teletoon stated that Total Drama Island, along with 6teen were "consistently top performers" for audiences of ages 6–11, and also helped to bring in older viewers as well. When Total Drama Island aired on Cartoon Network, it performed very well; The Toronto Star reported that, "in some age groups [Total Drama Island showed] a 500% ratings increase in [its] time slot." On December 11, 2008, Total Drama Island garnered 3.5 million viewers. That year, the series was the top "regularly scheduled Thursday night program at 9 p.m. on all television throughout third quarter among kids 2-11, 6-11 and 9-14," according to the Animation World Network. On Memorial Day weekend of 2009, a marathon of Total Drama Island increased viewership in age groups 2–11, 6–11, and 9–14, each by 20% or more compared to the same week in 2008. As of 2011, Total Drama Island has aired in over 188 countries.

=== Critical reception ===
Total Drama Island has received generally positive reviews. The series was nominated for a Gemini Award for "Best Animated Program or Series", shared by Tom McGillis, Jennifer Pertsch, George Elliott and Brian Irving. Common Sense Media gave the show 4 out of 5 stars, deeming it an "enjoyable, smart show" and finding that it appealed to all demographics. Matthew Price of The Oklahoman gave a mixed review of the series, stating that it "starts unbelievably slowly", but deeming that the later episodes effectively spoofed reality shows. Debi Enker of The Age gave a negative review of the season's last episode, calling the art, design and writing "lamentable."

== Media ==
=== DVD releases ===
A DVD was released by Warner Home Video on August 18, 2009, in the United States. It contains all of the 27 episodes (including TDI Rundown) of season one of this series in a 4 disc set, for a total of 594 minutes long. In addition, its bonus features (entitled as X-tras) are the audition tapes of twenty two campers, played after each of their respective eliminations, as well as Izzy's second audition tape and her exclusive interview with Chris (the latter of which is shown after Eva's second elimination). In Australia, Total Drama Island is on Region 4 DVD as separate volumes. This series of discs contains the widescreen version with uncut scenes and original dialogue, as seen on Teletoon and ABC3. In reviewing the DVD for season, Matthew Price of The Oklahoman wrote that while the show started out "unbelievably slowly," the series became more interesting as campers began getting voted off. Price also praised the parody of reality shows. In another review of the DVD, Jeffrey Kauffman of DVD Talk wrote that the character development was compelling and that the parody of reality shows were very funny. Mac McEntire of DVD Verdict praised the character development as well, but noted that the show sometimes sinks to "lowbrow gross-outs". Both Kauffman and McEntire recommended the series DVD.

=== Total Drama Island: Totally Interactive! ===
Total Drama Island: Totally Interactive! was an online game in Canada and the US marketed in conjunction with the television series. It was produced by Xenophile Media. By registering a free account, the player could play games using a customizable avatar to earn points for marshmallows. Marshmallows are used as money in the game so the player can buy in-game items. The player who earned the most points had their avatar make a cameo appearance in the season finale. The games were based on the challenges in the show. Total Drama Island: Totally Interactive! was nominated for an Interactive Emmy Award in 2007. However, the website is no longer available, as it was replaced by Total Drama Online and the Teletoon and Cartoon Network official sites.

== See also ==
- Battle for Dream Island, an animated web series inspired by Total Drama Island
- Mockumentary
