= Total Drama Action =

- The Total Drama Action logo.
- Starring: Christian Potenza; Clé Bennett; Sarah Gadon; Drew Nelson; Brian Froud; Stephanie Anne Mills; Adam Reid; Scott McCord; Novie Edwards; Rachel Wilson; Emilie-Claire Barlow; Katie Crown; Megan Fahlenbock; Dan Petronijevic; Kristin Fairlie
- No. of episodes: 27

Release
- Original network: Teletoon (Canada); Cartoon Network (U.S.)
- Original release: January 11, 2009 – June 10, 2010

Season chronology
- ← Previous; Island Next → World Tour

Total Drama Action (abbreviated to TDA) is a Canadian animated television series. It is the second season of Total Drama, airing after Total Drama Island. It premiered on Teletoon on January 11, 2009. This season was also created by the makers of 6teen, another Teletoon program. Unlike in previous seasons, Teletoon did not air new episodes every week.

== Plot ==
Like Total Drama Island, the previous season of Total Drama, much of Total Drama Action chronicles the events of the eponymous fictional reality show. The Total Drama series itself is an "animated reality television series," which stars the cast and crew of the fictional series, parodying many aspects of reality television. After last season's winner forgoes their prize money of C$100,000 (US$73,129.00) for a challenge (open to all 22 of Total Drama Island's contestants) in which the winner would receive C$1,000,000 (US$731,485.00), the money was left in limbo after a situation resulted in a 14-way tie.

Consequently, host Chris McLean (voiced by Christian Potenza) initiated a second season featuring all 14 contestants who tied. Two weeks after the aforementioned tie, the contestants who tied are told to arrive at an abandoned movie studio lot in Toronto, Ontario, where the new season, titled Total Drama Action, would take place. Due to its location, Chris told the contestants that the challenges would all be in the form of various movie genres. The accommodations of the contestants are handled by the underpaid Chef Hatchet (Clé Bennett), similar to how they were handled in the previous season. The outhouse, which was used as a confessional in Total Drama Island, has been replaced with a makeup trailer.

After the quick elimination of two contestants, the couple Bridgette (Kristin Fairlie) and Geoff (Dan Petronijevic), a second challenge determined the team captains of the two competing teams: the Screaming Gaffers, headed by Gwen (Megan Fahlenbock), and the Killer Grips, headed by Trent (Scott McCord). From then on, challenges would alternate between "reward challenges" where winners would receive a special prize, and "elimination challenges" where the losing team would vote off one of its own in an elaborate "Gilded Chris Ceremony".

The pattern of reducing the contestants down was briefly interrupted on two occasions: once when Izzy (Katie Crown) was reinstated following a voting irregularity where her alter-ego, "E-Scope", was voted off, and another time when Courtney (Emilie-Claire Barlow), a contestant who did not originally qualify for Total Drama Action, successfully sued the show and was added to the game. The players eliminated would make the "Walk of Shame" and to the "Lame-o-sine", where they leave the movie studio.

Once seven contestants were left, the Screaming Gaffers and the Killer Grips were dissolved, and the challenges became more individual-oriented. Chris hired Owen as his ringer to sabotage the other contestants and create drama. Eventually, two contestants were left standing: Duncan (Drew Nelson) and Beth (Sarah Gadon), with both contestants being considered official winners depending on the country of airing.

== Episodes ==
Total Drama Action debuted on January 11, 2009, at 6:30 p.m. on Teletoon, with its premiere on Cartoon Network following on June 11, 2009. In the U.S., Cartoon Network creates a disclaimer with a TV-PG-D rating before the previous show's recap. In the UK it aired on April 11, 2011, at 10:00 GMT as part of Disney XD's Easter Shows.

No. overall	No. in season	Title	Written by (Note: Information is taken from the opening credits of each episode.)	Canadian air date	U.S. air date	Prod. code
28	1	"Monster Cash"	Alice Prodanou	January 11, 2009	June 11, 2009	201
The participating contestants arrive to a rough start, at the film studio back lot to meet Chris McLean, where he tells them about the modifications and changes from Total Drama Island to Total Drama Action. Their first challenge will be one of the monstrous proportions, and Owen gets to pick the trailer for his fellow males.
29	2	"Alien Resurr-eggtion"	Nicole Demerse	January 18, 2009	June 18, 2009	202
The fourteen cast members must retrieve "alien" eggs and return them to the trailers without being caught by Mama Alien. However, the search for the eggs is made quite difficult thanks to Geoff and Bridgette's relationship and the alien's paintball skills. It's a race through a dark maze of alien slime, ending with Gwen and Trent winning, and Geoff and Bridgette will not be escaping this episode's elimination. Elimination: Bridgette and Geoff
30	3	"Riot on Set"	Alex Nussbaum	January 25, 2009	June 25, 2009	203
The teams are chosen by Gwen and Trent of the previous challenge, and their first challenge is to put on a play. While Izzy is chosen to play an old lady, the other team picks Duncan for the role of a rundown gangster. DJ's insecurity is discovered by Chef who decides to use it for his means. But when someone gives him the wrong scripts, things start to get weird and chaotic on the set. It all leads up to Izzy getting eliminated for her bad performance and getting 12th.
31	4	"Beach Blanket Bogus"	Emily Andras	February 1, 2009	July 2, 2009	204
The final eleven participate in a beach-themed challenge. Beth attempts to befriend the rest of her team, while Trent starts to have some problems with his relationship with Gwen. Meanwhile, Justin begins to show his true nature. The team that wins receives a wicked beach party.
32	5	"3:10 to Crazytown"	Nicole Demerse	February 8, 2009	July 9, 2009	205
The teams compete in Western-themed challenges. Trent continues to throw challenges for his love and Gwen can't stand it anymore. Their relationship finally reaches its end and Justin angrily blackmails Gwen as a result. It all ends with Trent taking the blame and being voted off, with Gwen owing the Grips a favour. Elimination: Trent
33	6	"Aftermath I: Trent's Descent"	Alice Prodanou	February 15, 2009	July 16, 2009	206
Geoff and Bridgette are hosting this season's new feature: a behind-the-scenes talk show. The non-returning contestants are back as the peanut gallery and Izzy and Trent are the guests of honor. However, the hosts start to have problems with each other as the show progresses.
34	7	"The Chefshank Redemption"	Brendon Yorke	April 5, 2009	July 23, 2009	207
The competition starts to heat up when the ten remaining castmates face the prison movie challenge. The Grips are pretty confident, as they have a special deal with Gwen from the opposing team as a result of her past actions. One team wins the first challenge, and Izzy returns to the competition. Gwen votes herself off due to her previous actions, though she feels she earned some extra "karma points" in doing so. Elimination: Gwen
35	8	"One Flu Over the Cuckoos"	Alex Ganetakos	April 12, 2009	July 30, 2009	208
The nine castmates take part in a medically-themed challenge. Izzy has returned, making Owen very happy. Leshawna tries to make an alliance with Duncan and Harold, to outnumber Heather. Then, when an infectious disease breaks out, things go critical on set. When Duncan and Leshawna save the cast, their acting skills gets Leshawna the reward.
36	9	"The Sand Witch Project"	Shelley Scarrow	April 19, 2009	August 6, 2009	209
The castmates compete in a horror-themed challenge. Lindsay starts taking the leadership role of her team, and DJ's conscience begins to bother him about his previous actions. This leads to DJ quitting from the competition even though his team won the challenge, saving Lindsay and Justin from potential elimination. Elimination: DJ
37	10	"Masters of Disasters"	Alex Nussbaum	April 26, 2009	August 13, 2009	210
It is a disastrous time for the eight cast members, as they face their disaster movie challenge, which includes earthquakes, floods, and lava spills. The disasters get much worse as Owen gets seriously injured and the others find themselves in deep water - literally! Leshawna accidentally reveals her secret in front of her teammates, angering them. Ultimately, the castmates are saved by Harold and the Gaffers win a reward.
38	11	"Full Metal Drama"	James Hurst	May 3, 2009	August 20, 2009	211
War comes to the set as tensions rise between the castmates. As lies and mistrusts continue to plague Leshawna, Duncan and Harold are at each other's throats about who is the better teammate while someone's influential powers start to wear off on two others. In the end, Duncan and Harold become allies and win the war while Izzy's disinterest in Justin is still enough to get her eliminated again. Elimination: Izzy (2nd time, as herself)
39	12	"Aftermath II: Forgive & For-Gwen"	Shelley Scarrow	May 10, 2009	August 27, 2009	212
The Aftermath show returns with Gwen and Trent in the hot seat, but trouble erupts when Geoff attempts to boost viewers with harsh segments and embarrassing clips of the guests, which push apart Geoff and Bridgette. Gwen's behavior on the show made her lose a lot of her friends from the previous season, but Trent manages to save her relationship with everyone in the studio.
40	13	"Ocean's Eight -or Nine"	Paul Poque	June 24, 2009	September 3, 2009	213
The two teams compete in a series of bank heist themed challenges, while Leshawna faces the consequences of her past actions, and begins to regret what she did. Then, the action really heats up when Courtney returns to the show due to a lawsuit. This leads to the losing team trying to send Courtney home, but in the end, their votes are declared null and void, and Owen is sent home instead.
41	14	"One Million Bucks B.C."	John Slama	September 10, 2009	September 10, 2009	214
Chris turns back the clock to the stone age in this challenge, and the eight castmates are forced to take part in prehistoric challenges. While Courtney bends the rules, Duncan proves that he is not above cheating. Meanwhile, Heather goes to drastic measures in order to get what she wants. In the end, one team proves that they are higher than the other in the evolution chart and receive a nice good meal.
42	15	"Million Dollar Babies"	Richard Clark	September 17, 2009	September 13, 2009	215
The final eight compete in sports-themed challenges. Beth's infatuation with a mysterious love, combined with Courtney's new rules and conditions, causes a small problem to arise between Leshawna and the other seven. However, after an accepted apology, Heather gets sent home instead. Elimination: Heather
43	16	"Dial M for Merger"	Alan Resnick	October 1, 2009	September 24, 2009	216
The teams have been dissolved as the seven castmates faces off in a spy challenge filled with lasers, explosives, bombs, and really bad accents! Justin trusts his previously reluctant brain throughout the challenges, and Leshawna successfully makes an alliance with Duncan and Harold. After the blackmail plot of a schemer gets foiled, two winners are declared and this earns them a trip that was not worth the effort.
44	17	"Super Hero-ld"	Alex Nussbaum	October 8, 2009	October 1, 2009	217
It is a super time on set as the seven contestants participate in superhero-based challenges. Courtney forms a fierce, fierce rivalry with Lindsay, while Duncan and Harold maintain their old rivalry as their "alliance" falls apart. A new alliance is formed, replacing an old one and it all ends with Leshawna's elimination, and Harold's heartbreak. Elimination: Leshawna
45	18	"Aftermath III: O-wen or Lose"	Alice Prodanou	October 22, 2009	October 8, 2009	218
It is another episode of the Total Drama Aftermath, Owen, Heather, and Leshawna take the stage for an exclusive interview about their time on the show. However, trouble ensues when Bridgette finally becomes fed up with Geoff's new attitude to the point that she breaks up with him on live TV. It takes several people and a shocking therapy to finally make this Captain Hollywood realize the error of his ways.
46	19	"The Princess Pride"	Heather Jackson	November 5, 2009	October 15, 2009	219
Fairy tales come to the set of the show as a princess is crowned, causing two knights to form a fierce rivalry over love. Despite fighting his way through dragons and ogres, Justin finally meets his ultimate end in the game and gets his long waited comeuppance after Courtney refuses to return his love. Elimination: Justin
47	20	"Get a Clue"	Alex Nussbaum	November 12, 2009	October 22, 2009	220
It is crime-solving time on set as the final five participates in three mystery-themed challenges. As Lindsay starts to apply herself, Courtney continues to be fed up with her. As a result, the two find themselves butting heads quite often. To make matters worse, Chris is found dead on a moving train, and Courtney seems to be amongst them. In the end, Lindsay wins a reward and uses it to make someone else jealous, asserting her strategic prowess.
48	21	"Rock 'n Rule"	Alan Resnick	November 19, 2009	October 29, 2009	221
The final five turn into six after Owen returns to the game after got kicked off unfairly and filed a lawsuit and Chris agrees to let him back so he could pay off his family's debt because of a cheese seller. He and the final five compete in rock and roll themed challenges. Courtney wins invincibility again, so Lindsay plots for Duncan's downfall to weaken Courtney's chances. In the end, Lindsay accidentally eliminates herself, leaving Beth sad. Elimination: Lindsay
49	22	"Crouching Courtney, Hidden Owen"	Alex Ganetakos	November 19, 2009	November 5, 2009	222
A kung fu challenge comes to the set as the boys battle against the girls. Owen is not allowed to compete and must sabotage the teams instead for extra drama, but fails. Courtney desperately tries to form an alliance with Beth, while Harold and Duncan start to mend their conflict. However, Owen soon ruins their new friendship and the unlikely winner, Harold, earns himself a feast.
50	23	"2008: A Space Owen"	Ken Cuperus	November 26, 2009	November 12, 2009	223
The show lifts off as the final five compete in space-themed challenges in order to win immunity. Courtney and Beth start to feel a strain on their recently made alliance, and Owen can't shake off his guilt. Beth and Harold begin to secretly develop crushes on each other. After a number of calculations, Harold believes that Owen is a traitor among the cast, but he is unable to warn the other remaining castmates before being eliminated. Elimination: Harold
51	24	"Top Dog!"	Ken Cuperus	November 26, 2009	November 19, 2009	224
The final five narrows to the final four as they participate in an animal-themed challenge, as the castmates return to the location of season one. The drama intensifies when Owen is exposed for the mole he is. At the elimination ceremony, Courtney meets her end in the contest, along with her long awaited comeuppance, but not before discovering a spy and causing Owen to be fired. This all leads up to Duncan and Beth being determined. Elimination: Courtney and Owen (2nd time)
52	25	"Mutiny on the Soundstage!"	Brendon Yorke	December 3, 2009	December 3, 2009	225
Duncan and Beth compete in a pirate-themed challenge. However, total chaos breaks loose as they start a fight that threatens their friendship. The final two are pushed through a treasure hunt of knowledge and endure all of the elimination challenges in addition to one more, due to a choice. As the two finalists race to the end, something unexpected happens.
53	26	"Aftermath IV: Who Wants to Pick a Millionaire???"	Alex Nussbaum	December 10, 2009	December 10, 2009	226
Duncan and Beth attempt to find a way to break the tie and eventually are asked various questions by the eliminated contestants, who then vote for the winner. Runner-Up: Beth/Duncan Winner: Duncan/Beth
54	27	"Celebrity Manhunt's TDA Reunion Special"	Brendon Yorke	June 10, 2010	April 6, 2010	227
All twenty-two contestants gather at the Gemmie Awards for their show's nomination. However, their world comes crashing down when Chris announces a new reality show to replace them. In a desperate attempt to save their fame, all of the contestants (plus a new face) join together in a race to New York City in a bus to beat a team of dirtbags and their leader. All the while, a third show documents their every move.

=== Episode finale variations ===
The show's producers created two alternate endings for the final episode, such that the winner seen in one country's broadcasts is the runner-up in other countries (and vice versa) where the show airs. In Canada, Duncan was aired as the winner as well as in Denmark, Latin America, Norway, the Philippines, and in the United States. Beth is also depicted as the winner in airings from Australia, Brazil, Bulgaria, Croatia, Finland, France, Hungary, Israel, Italy, the Netherlands, New Zealand, Poland, Portugal, Romania, Russia, Serbia, Singapore, Spain, South Africa, Sweden, and the United Kingdom.

== Characters ==
The main Total Drama Action cast consists of host Chris McLean, assistant Chef Hatchet, and the contestants that make up the castmates. The remaining contestants from Total Drama Island also appear on the show, but serve in lesser capacities as commentators on The Aftermath. The contestants were Trent, Lindsay, Gwen, Owen, DJ, Beth, Geoff, Leshawna, Izzy, Heather, Bridgette, Justin, Harold, Duncan, and eventually Courtney.

=== Staff ===
Character	Voice actor	Description
Chris McLean	Christian Potenza	Chris is the host of the series.
Chef Hatchet	Clé Bennett	Chef is the cook and the co-host of the series.

=== Contestants ===
List of Total Drama Action contestants
Contestant	Label	Voice actor	Team		Finish	
Contestant	Label	Voice actor	Original	Merged	Placement	Episode
Bridgette	The Surfer Girl	Kristin Fairlie	None		1st/2nd eliminated	2
Geoff	The Party Guy	Dan Petronijevic	None		1st/2nd eliminated	2
E-Scope (Izzy) (Returned to game)			Killer Grips		3rd eliminated	3
Trent	The Deep & Mysterious	Scott McCord	Killer Grips		4th eliminated	5
Gwen	The Goth Girl	Megan Fahlenbock	Screaming Gaffers		5th eliminated	7
DJ	The Teddy Bear	Clé Bennett	Screaming Gaffers		6th eliminated (Quit)	9
Izzy	The Insane	Katie Crown	Killer Grips		7th eliminated	11
Owen (Returned to game)			Killer Grips		8th eliminated	13
Heather	The Queen Bee	Rachel Wilson	Screaming Gaffers		9th eliminated	15
Leshawna	The Lively	Novie Edwards	Screaming Gaffers	None	10th eliminated	17
Justin	The Jaw-Dropping	Adam Reid	Killer Grips	None	11th eliminated	19
Lindsay	The Dimwit	Stephanie Anne Mills	Killer Grips	None	12th eliminated	21
Harold	The Uber-Geek	Brian Froud	Screaming Gaffers	None	13th eliminated	23
Courtney (Note: Courtney debuted in episode 13.)	The Overachiever	Emilie-Claire Barlow	Killer Grips	None	14th eliminated	24
Owen	The Big Guy	Scott McCord	Killer Grips	None	15th eliminated (Disqualified)	24
Beth	The Wannabe	Sarah Gadon	Killer Grips	None	Winner/Runner Up	26
Duncan	The Criminal	Drew Nelson	Screaming Gaffers	None	Winner/Runner Up	26

== Season summary ==
Total Drama Action season summary
Episode			Original airdate		Challenge		Eliminated	
No.	Title	Written by	Canada	United States	Movie genre	Winner(s)	Team	Castmate
1	"Monster Cash"	Alice Prodanou	Jan. 11, 2009	June 11, 2009	Monster	Owen	None	
2	"Alien Resurr-eggtion"	Nicole Demerse	Jan. 18, 2009	June 18, 2009	Alien	Gwen & Trent	None	Bridgette & Geoff
3	"Riot on Set"	Alex Nussbaum	Jan. 25, 2009	June 25, 2009	Drama	Screaming Gaffers	Killer Grips	E-Scope
4	"Beach Blanket Bogus"	Emily Andras	Feb. 1, 2009	July 2, 2009	Beach	Screaming Gaffers	None	
5	"3:10 to Crazytown"	Nicole Demerse	Feb. 8, 2009	July 9, 2009	Western	Screaming Gaffers	Killer Grips	Trent
6	"The Aftermath: I"	Alice Prodanou	Feb. 15, 2009	July 16, 2009	Total Drama Aftermath			
7	"The Chefshank Redemption"	Brendon Yorke	April 5, 2009	July 23, 2009	Prison	Killer Grips	Screaming Gaffers	Gwen
8	"One Flu Over the Cuckoos"	Alex Ganetakos	April 12, 2009	July 30, 2009	Medical	Leshawna (Screaming Gaffers)	None	
9	"The Sand Witch Project"	Shelley Scarrow	April 19, 2009	Aug. 6, 2009	Horror	Screaming Gaffers	Screaming Gaffers	DJ
10	"Masters of Disasters"	Alex Nussbaum	April 26, 2009	Aug. 13, 2009	Disaster	Screaming Gaffers	None	
11	"Full Metal Drama"	James Hurst	May 3, 2009	Aug. 20, 2009	War	Screaming Gaffers	Killer Grips	Izzy
12	"The Aftermath: II"	Shelley Scarrow	May 10, 2009	Aug. 27, 2009	Total Drama Aftermath			
13	"Ocean's Eight—or Nine"	Paul Pogue	June 24, 2009	Sept. 3, 2009	Bank heist	Screaming Gaffers	Killer Grips	Owen
14	"One Million Bucks, B.C."	John Slama	Sept. 17, 2009	Sept. 10, 2009	Prehistoric	Killer Grips	None	
15	"Million Dollar Babies"	Richard Clark	Sept. 24, 2009	Sept. 13, 2009	Sports	Killer Grips	Screaming Gaffers	Heather
16	"Dial M for Merger"	Alan Resnick	Oct. 1, 2009	Sept. 24, 2009	Spy	Courtney & Lindsay	None	
17	"Super Hero-ld"	Alex Nussbaum	Oct. 8, 2009	Oct. 1, 2009	Superhero	Courtney	None	Leshawna
18	"The Aftermath: III"	Alice Prodanou	Oct. 15, 2009	Oct. 8, 2009	Total Drama Aftermath			
19	"The Princess Pride"	Heather Jackson	Nov. 5, 2009	Oct. 15, 2009	Fairy tale	Courtney	None	Justin
20	"Get a Clue"	Alex Nussbaum	Nov. 12, 2009	Oct. 22, 2009	Mystery	Lindsay	None	
21	"Rock n' Rule"	Alan Resnick	Nov. 19, 2009	Oct. 29, 2009	Rock & roll	Courtney	None	Lindsay
22	"Crouching Courtney, Hidden Owen"	Alex Ganetakos	Nov. 19, 2009	Nov. 5, 2009	Kung fu	Harold	None	
23	"2008: A Space Owen"	Ken Cuperus	Nov. 26, 2009	Nov. 12, 2009	Space	Beth	None	Harold
24	"Top Dog"	Ken Cuperus	Nov. 26, 2009	Nov. 19, 2009	Animal buddy	Beth	None	Courtney
24	"Top Dog"	Ken Cuperus	Nov. 26, 2009	Nov. 19, 2009	Animal buddy	Beth	None	Owen
25	"Mutiny on the Soundstage"	Brendon Yorke	Dec. 3, 2009		Pirate & misc.	Tie	To be continued…	
26	"The Aftermath: IV"	Alex Nussbaum	Dec. 10, 2009		None	Beth/Duncan	None	Duncan/Beth
27	"Celebrity Manhunt's Total Drama Action Reunion Special"	Brendon Yorke	June 10, 2010	April 6, 2010	Special			

== Elimination table ==
Contestant	Episode																									
Contestant	1	2	3	4	5	6	7	8	9	10	11	12	13	14	15	16	17	18	19	20	21	22	23	24	25–26	27
Beth	—N/a	SAFE	SAFE	—N/a	SAFE	—N/a	WIN	—N/a	SAFE	—N/a	SAFE	—N/a	SAFE	WIN	WIN	—N/a	SAFE	—N/a	SAFE	—N/a	SAFE	—N/a	WIN	WIN	WINNER	No
Duncan	—N/a	SAFE	WIN	WIN	WIN	—N/a	SAFE	—N/a	WIN	WIN	WIN	—N/a	WIN	—N/a	SAFE	—N/a	BTM2	—N/a	BTM2	—N/a	BTM2	—N/a	SAFE	SAFE	WINNER	Yes
Owen	WIN	SAFE	SAFE	—N/a	BTM2	—N/a	WIN	—N/a	SAFE	—N/a	SAFE	—N/a	OUT					Guest			SAFE	—N/a	SAFE	DQ		Yes
Courtney													SAFE	WIN	WIN	WIN	WIN	—N/a	WIN	—N/a	WIN	—N/a	BTM2	OUT		Yes
Harold	—N/a	SAFE	WIN	WIN	WIN	—N/a	SAFE	—N/a	WIN	WIN	WIN	—N/a	WIN	—N/a	SAFE	—N/a	SAFE	—N/a	SAFE	—N/a	SAFE	WIN	OUT			Yes
Lindsay	—N/a	SAFE	BTM3	—N/a	SAFE	—N/a	WIN	—N/a	BTM2	—N/a	SAFE	—N/a	SAFE	WIN	WIN	WIN	SAFE	—N/a	SAFE	WIN	OUT					Yes
Justin	—N/a	SAFE	BTM3	—N/a	SAFE	—N/a	WIN	—N/a	BTM2	—N/a	BTM2	—N/a	SAFE	WIN	WIN	—N/a	SAFE	—N/a	OUT							No
Leshawna	—N/a	BTM3	WIN	WIN	WIN	—N/a	SAFE	WIN	WIN	WIN	WIN	—N/a	WIN	—N/a	BTM2	—N/a	OUT	Guest								Yes
Heather	—N/a	SAFE	WIN	WIN	WIN	—N/a	BTM2	—N/a	WIN	WIN	WIN	—N/a	WIN	—N/a	OUT			Guest								Yes
Izzy	—N/a	SAFE	OUT			Guest	WIN	—N/a	SAFE	—N/a	OUT	Guest														Yes
DJ	—N/a	SAFE	WIN	WIN	WIN	—N/a	SAFE	—N/a	QUIT			Guest														Yes
Gwen	—N/a	WIN	WIN	WIN	WIN	—N/a	OUT					Guest														Yes
Trent	—N/a	WIN	SAFE	—N/a	OUT	Guest																				No
Bridgette	—N/a	OUT				Host						Host						Host							Host	Yes
Geoff	—N/a	OUT				Host						Host						Host							Host	No

== Production ==
Like Total Drama Island, Total Drama Action was developed and produced by Fresh TV, targeting an age group of 10-to 16-year-olds. Many of the show's settings, as well as the show's opening sequence, are deliberately made to be as close as possible to their Total Drama Island counterparts; Camp Wawanakwa, the setting of Total Drama Island, was also revisited on several occasions, most notably as the site of some of the season's challenges. All of the cast of Total Drama Island return in the same roles as that of Total Drama Island, though some had their roles reduced as their characters were not as prominent in this season. As with Total Drama Island, two endings were commissioned for the series, one with each of the final two competitors winning; after the airing of the penultimate episode and prior to the season finale, viewers were prompted to the show's website (either at Teletoon for viewers in Canada or Cartoon Network for American viewers) to vote for the desired ending. Unlike Total Drama Island, however, the alternate ending was available as a webcast on the show's website immediately following its airing.

== Reception ==
Total Drama Action has received generally positive reviews from critics and fans, though not as much as its predecessor. Most critics agree the season does not live up to the first season, Total Drama Island, though they did praise for its character development on characters who did not get as much time in the previous season. Total Drama Action received a 7.6 on Metacritic by fans, which indicates "generally favorable reviews".

== Media ==
=== DVD releases ===
Total Drama Action has only been publicly sold on DVD in Australia. The first half of the season was released on a Region 4 DVD, on November 2, 2011. The second half of the season was released exclusively to Australia, on July 4, 2012.
