= Drew Nelson (actor) =

Canadian voice, stage, film and television actor

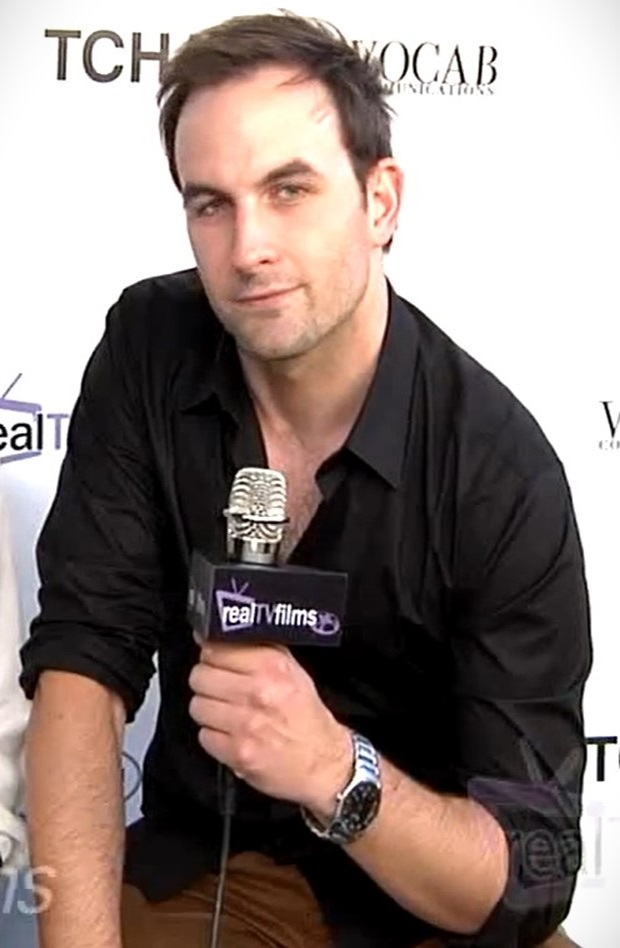
- Nelson interviewed at Toronto International Film Festival 2011
- Born: August 11, 1979 (age 47); Etobicoke, Ontario, Canada
- Occupations: Actor; writer; producer
- Years active: 2001–present

Drew Nelson (born August 11, 1979) is a Canadian voice, stage, film and television actor from Etobicoke, Ontario. He is best known for voicing Duncan on the Canadian cartoon series Total Drama and playing Matt Sayles in The Strain.

== Personal life ==
Nelson was born in Etobicoke, a suburb of Toronto, Ontario, on August 11, 1979. He attended Richview Collegiate Institute and Humber College.

== Career ==
He has been in numerous television shows. He first appeared in the television series Friends as an extra.

His performances include appearing as a guest-star or extra in various movies or TV shows, such as Fringe, Supernatural, and Rookie Blue. Most of Nelson's best-known roles are in cartoons, such as Duncan in Total Drama, Kai in 6teen, and Jason in Girlstuff/Boystuff. He also had a recurring role on the FX series, The Strain.

Nelson is also currently working on a project called Lost Ones as a writer-producer. The project is an urban fantasy centered around a 13-year-old orphan named Malik. It is set against the backdrop of hip hop and street art. The film follows Malik and his crew as they plot to foil a greedy mayor's plans to gentrify their hood.

== Filmography ==
=== Anime ===
Year	Title	Role	Notes
2006	The Story of Saiunkoku	Spy	Episode: "Poking a Bush Draws Out a Snake"
2007	Death Note	Matt	2 episodes

=== Film ===
Year	Title	Role	Notes
1995	Die Hard with a Vengeance	Kindergarten Student	Uncredited
2001	681-0638	Sterling	
2004	My Brother's Keeper	Lance	
2006	Catch and Release	Scott Prosper	Short Film
2006	Perennial	Jaret	Short Film
2007	Live Free or Die Hard	Cyber Hacker	Uncredited
2007	The Rocket Man	Lenny	Short Film
2008	Dawgs Playing Poker	Alex	
2013	A Plain Morning	Greg	Short Film
2014	The Whale	Kyle McWhirter	Short Film
2015	Man Vs.	Terry Woods	
2015	To Carry On	The Machinist	Short Film
2015	Fifth Street	Stuart	Short Film
2018	Knuckleball	Deputy Sherriff Drew	
2018	Fahrenheit 451	Bartender	
2019	Demons Inside Me	Harrison Carter	
2020	Kitty Mammas	Darryl	
2024	Dada	Engineer	
2027	Paranormal Activity 8	Self	

=== Television ===
Year	Title	Role	Notes
2001	In a Heartbeat	Daredevil	Episode: "Race of a Lifetime"
2002	Earth: Final Conflict	Damon	Episode: "Atavus High"
2002	The Red Sneakers	Jacob	TV movie
2002	The Matthew Shepard Story	Lance	TV movie
2002	Two Against Time	Eddie Bramante	TV movie
2002	Recipe for Murder	Fan #1	TV movie
2002	Conviction	Billy	TV movie
2002–2005	Girlstuff/Boystuff	Jason (voice)	34 episodes
2004	Queer as Folk	Pink Posse / Robbie	2 episodes
2004	Degrassi: The Next Generation	Keg Guy	Episode: "Ghost in the Machine: Part 2"
2004	Spynet	Rod	Episode: "The Talented Mr. Minnifield"
2004	Braceface	Alex (voice)	Episode: "Leap of Faith"; uncredited
2005	6teen	Kai (voice)	Episode: "The New Guy"
2005	Mind Over Murder	Dr. Michaels	TV movie
2007–2013	Total Drama	Duncan (voice)	74 episodes
2008	Smallville	CSI Agent #2	Episode: "Plastique"
2008	Supernatural	Crossroads Demon	Episode: "I Know What You Did Last Summer"
2009	Fringe	Carl Langdon	Episode: "Dream Logic"
2011	InSecurity	Special Agent Tom Daley	2 episodes
2011	XIII: The Series	Jacob Locke	2 episodes
2011	Rookie Blue	Vincent Walker	Episode: "Best Laid Plans"
2011	Flashpoint	Bernard Moore	Episode: "Grounded"
2011	Against the Wall	Rick Rose	Episode: "Memories We Fear"
2011	Lost Girl	Clive	Episode: "Can't See the Fae-Rest"
2013	Suits	Graham Stenton	Episode: "Shadow of a Doubt"
2014	The Listener	Steven Wolff	Episode: "Zero Recall"
2014	The Strain	Matt Sayles	6 episodes
2014	Saving Hope	Colin Merrifield	Episode: "Breaking Away"
2014	Charlie and Yoni		TV movie
2015	CSI: Cyber	Robert Gaines	Episode: "Brown Eyes, Blue Eyes"
2016–2017	People of Earth	Kurt the Reptilian / The Deer	12 episodes
2016–2017	The Girlfriend Experience	Matt Cusick / Jim Kinsler	8 episodes
2018	Blink Twice	Ryan	Episode: "Fragment"
2018	Entertaining Christmas	Steve Ryan	TV movie
2018–2023	Total DramaRama	Duncan (voice)	56 episodes
2019	My Mother's Killer Boyfriend	Ben Weston	TV movie
2020	Diggstown	Victor Deer	Episode: "Cheryl Battiste"
2021	A Romance Wedding	Will Mason	TV movie
2021	Dream Date	Maurice	TV movie
2021	A Whirlwind Wedding	Kyle Billings	TV movie
2021	Blood and Water	Ben McMurphy	7 episodes
2022	Mayor of Kingstown	Shift Commander	Episode: "The Lie of the Truth"
2022	Hudson & Rex	Keith Traymore	Episode: "Nightmare on Water St."
2022	Five Days at Memorial	Nick Edmunds	Episode: "Nobody Knows the Trouble I've Seen"
2022	Witch Mountain	Meadows	TV Movie
2023	Burned by Love	Grant Drysdale	TV Movie
2025	Reacher	Greene	Episode: "Smoke on the Water"
2025	Mafia Boss Takes High School	Vinny Bergini	TV Mini Series
