= List of Total Drama episodes =

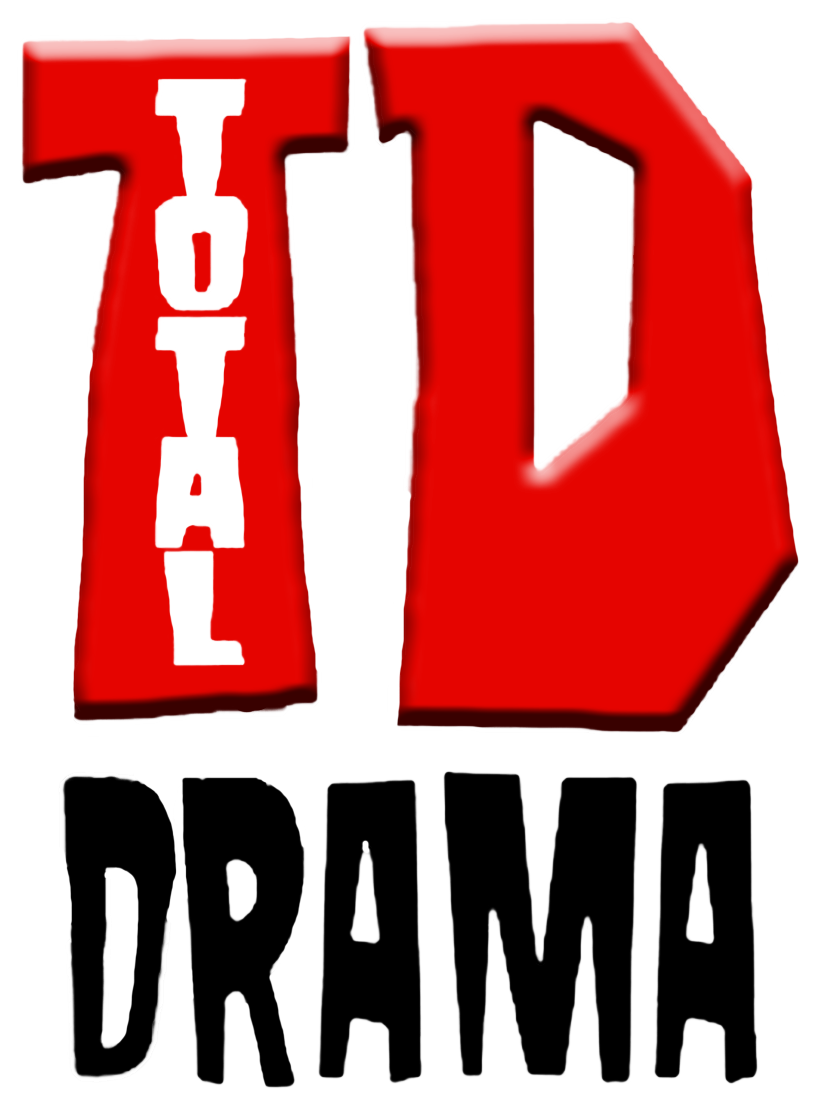
The main series' logo

This article contains a list of all the episodes to the Total Drama series, a Canadian animated television show which aired on Teletoon in Canada and Cartoon Network in the United States.

As of April 14, 2024, a total of 145 episodes of Total Drama have been broadcast over six seasons; the 100th episode of the series was aired on February 27, 2014.

== Series overview ==
Series	Season	Title	Episodes		Originally released (Canada)	
Series	Season	Title	Episodes		First released	Last released
Total Drama	1	Island (2007)	27		July 8, 2007	November 29, 2008
Total Drama	2	Action	27		January 11, 2009	June 10, 2010
Total Drama	3	World Tour	26		June 10, 2010	April 24, 2011
Total Drama	4	Revenge of the Island	13		January 5, 2012	April 12, 2012
Total Drama	5	All-Stars	26	13	September 10, 2013	December 13, 2013
Total Drama	5	Pahkitew Island	26	13	July 7, 2014	July 18, 2014
Total Drama	6	Island (2023)	26	13	October 21, 2023	December 2, 2023
Total Drama	6	Island (2024)	26	13	March 3, 2024	April 14, 2024
Total Drama Presents:	1	The Ridonculous Race	26		September 7, 2015	October 9, 2015

== Episodes ==
=== Season 1: Island (2007–08) ===
No. overall	No. in season	Title	Written by	Canadian air date	U.S. air date	Prod. code
1	1	"Not-So Happy Campers – Part 1"	Jennifer Pertsch	July 8, 2007	June 5, 2008	101
2	2	"Not So Happy Campers – Part 2"	Jennifer Pertsch	July 8, 2007	June 12, 2008	102
3	3	"The Big Sleep"	Nicole Demerse	July 15, 2007	June 19, 2008	103
4	4	"Dodgebrawl"	Alex Nussbaum	July 22, 2007	June 26, 2008	104
5	5	"Not Quite Famous"	Jennifer Cowan	July 29, 2007	July 3, 2008	105
6	6	"The Sucky Outdoors"	Jennifer Pertsch	August 5, 2007	July 10, 2008	106
7	7	"Phobia Factor"	Shelley Scarrow	August 12, 2007	July 17, 2008	107
8	8	"Up the Creek"	Alex Nussbaum	August 19, 2007	July 24, 2008	108
9	9	"Paintball Deer Hunter"	Shelley Scarrow	August 26, 2007	July 31, 2008	109
10	10	"If You Can't Take the Heat..."	Alex Ganetakos	September 2, 2007	August 7, 2008	110
11	11	"Who Can You Trust?"	Alex Nussbaum	September 9, 2007	August 14, 2008	111
12	12	"Basic Straining"	Jennifer Pertsch	September 16, 2007	August 21, 2008	112
13	13	"X-Treme Torture"	Erika Strobel	September 23, 2007	August 28, 2008	113
14	14	"Brunch of Disgustingness"	Alex Nussbaum	September 30, 2007	September 4, 2008	114
15	15	"No Pain, No Game"	Erika Strobel	October 7, 2007	September 11, 2008	115
16	16	"Search & Do Not Destroy"	Alex Nussbaum	October 14, 2007	September 18, 2008	116
17	17	"Hide & Be Sneaky"	Tom McGillis	October 21, 2007	September 25, 2008	117
18	18	"That's Off the Chain!"	Erika Strobel	October 28, 2007	October 2, 2008	118
19	19	"Hook, Line & Screamer"	Erika Strobel	November 4, 2007	October 9, 2008	119
20	20	"Wawanakwa Gone Wild!"	Shelley Scarrow	November 11, 2007	October 16, 2008	120
21	21	"Trial by Tri-Armed Triathlon"	Shelley Scarrow	November 18, 2007	October 23, 2008	121
22	22	"Haute Camp-Ture" "After the Dock of Shame"	Alex Nussbaum	November 25, 2007	October 30, 2008	122
23	23	"Camp Castaways"	Erika Strobel	December 2, 2007	November 6, 2008	123
24	24	"Are We There, Yeti?"	Alex Nussbaum	December 9, 2007	November 13, 2008	124
25	25	"I Triple Dog Dare You!"	Erika Strobel	December 16, 2007	November 20, 2008	125
26	26	"The Very Last Episode, Really!"	Jennifer Pertsch	January 4, 2008	December 11, 2008	126
27	27	"Total Drama Drama Drama Drama Island"	Jennifer Pertsch and Tom McGillis	November 29, 2008	December 18, 2008	127

=== Season 2: Action (2009–10) ===
No. overall	No. in season	Title	Written by (Note: Information is taken from the opening credits of each episode.)	Canadian air date	U.S. air date	Prod. code
28	1	"Monster Cash"	Alice Prodanou	January 11, 2008	June 11, 2008	201
29	2	"Alien Resurr-eggtion"	Nicole Demerse	January 18, 2008	June 18, 2008	202
30	3	"Riot on Set"	Alex Nussbaum	January 25, 2008	June 25, 2008	203
31	4	"Beach Blanket Bogus"	Emily Andras	February 1, 2009	July 2, 2009	204
32	5	"3:10 to Crazytown"	Nicole Demerse	February 8, 2009	July 9, 2009	205
33	6	"Aftermath I: Trent's Descent"	Alice Prodanou	February 15, 2009	July 16, 2009	206
34	7	"The Chefshank Redemption"	Brendon Yorke	April 5, 2009	July 23, 2009	207
35	8	"One Flu Over the Cuckoos"	Alex Ganetakos	April 12, 2009	July 30, 2009	208
36	9	"The Sand Witch Project"	Shelley Scarrow	April 19, 2009	August 6, 2009	209
37	10	"Masters of Disasters"	Alex Nussbaum	April 26, 2009	August 13, 2009	210
38	11	"Full Metal Drama"	James Hurst	May 3, 2009	August 20, 2009	211
39	12	"Aftermath II: Forgive & For-Gwen"	Shelley Scarrow	May 10, 2009	August 27, 2009	212
40	13	"Ocean's Eight -or Nine"	Paul Poque	June 24, 2009	September 3, 2009	213
41	14	"One Million Bucks B.C."	John Slama	September 10, 2009	September 10, 2009	214
42	15	"Million Dollar Babies"	Richard Clark	September 17, 2009	September 13, 2009	215
43	16	"Dial M for Merger"	Alan Resnick	October 1, 2009	September 24, 2009	216
44	17	"Super Hero-ld"	Alex Nussbaum	October 8, 2009	October 1, 2009	217
45	18	"Aftermath III: O-wen or Lose"	Alice Prodanou	October 22, 2009	October 8, 2009	218
46	19	"The Princess Pride"	Heather Jackson	November 5, 2009	October 15, 2009	219
47	20	"Get a Clue"	Alex Nussbaum	November 12, 2009	October 22, 2009	220
48	21	"Rock 'n Rule"	Alan Resnick	November 19, 2009	October 29, 2009	221
49	22	"Crouching Courtney, Hidden Owen"	Alex Ganetakos	November 19, 2009	November 5, 2009	222
50	23	"2008: A Space Owen"	Ken Cuperus	November 26, 2009	November 12, 2009	223
51	24	"Top Dog!"	Ken Cuperus	November 26, 2009	November 19, 2009	224
52	25	"Mutiny on the Soundstage!"	Brendon Yorke	December 3, 2009	December 3, 2009	225
53	26	"Aftermath IV: Who Wants to Pick a Millionaire???"	Alex Nussbaum	December 10, 2009	December 10, 2009	226
54	27	"Celebrity Manhunt's TDA Reunion Special"	Brendon Yorke	June 10, 2010	April 6, 2010	227

=== Season 3: World Tour (2010–11) ===
No. overall	No. in season	Title	Written by	Canadian air date	U.S. air date	Prod. code	U.S. viewers (millions)
55	1	"Walk Like an Egyptian – Part 1"	Shelley Scarrow	June 10, 2009	June 21, 2009	301	2.20
56	2	"Walk Like an Egyptian – Part 2"	Alex Ganetakos	September 9, 2009	June 28, 2009	302	1.66
57	3	"Super Crazy Happy Fun Time Japan"	Adam Rotstein & Doug Hadders	September 16, 2009	July 5, 2009	303	N/A
58	4	"Anything Yukon Do, I Can Do Better"	Terry McGurrin	September 23, 2010	July 12, 2010	304	N/A
59	5	"Broadway, Baby!"	Alex Ganetakos	September 30, 2010	July 19, 2010	305	1.59
60	6	"TDWT Aftermath I: Bridgette over Troubled Water"	Shelley Scarrow	October 7, 2010	July 19, 2010 (Note: All Aftermath episodes were aired as online exclusives in the US.)	306	N/A
61	7	"Slap Slap Revolution"	Laurie Elliott	October 14, 2010	July 26, 2010	307	1.82
62	8	"The Am-AH-Zon Race"	Terry McGurrin	November 4, 2010	August 2, 2010	308	1.59
63	9	"Can't Help Falling in Louvre"	Adam Rotstein & Doug Hadders	November 18, 2010	August 9, 2010	309	1.87
64	10	"Newf Kids on the Rock"	Alex Nussbaum	November 25, 2010	August 16, 2010	310	1.53
65	11	"Jamaica Me Sweat"	Emily Andras & Brendon Yorke	December 2, 2010	August 23, 2010	311	1.47
66	12	"TDWT Aftermath II: Revenge of the Telethon"	Alex Ganetakos	December 9, 2010	August 30, 2010	312	N/A
67	13	"I See London..."	Shelley Scarrow	December 16, 2010	August 30, 2010	313	1.52
68	14	"Greece's Pieces"	Terry McGurrin	December 30, 2010	September 6, 2010	314	N/A
69	15	"The Ex-Files"	Laurie Elliott	January 6, 2011	September 13, 2010	315	1.59
70	16	"Picnic at Hanging Dork"	Michael Gelbart	January 13, 2011	September 20, 2010	316	1.27
71	17	"Sweden Sour"	Terry McGurrin	January 20, 2011	September 27, 2010	317	1.59
72	18	"TDWT Aftermath III: Aftermath Aftermayhem"	Laurie Elliott	January 27, 2011	September 27, 2010	318	N/A
73	19	"Niagara Brawls"	Emer Connon	February 3, 2011	October 4, 2010	319	N/A
74	20	"Chinese Fake-Out"	James Hurst	February 10, 2011	October 11, 2010	320	1.70
75	21	"African Lying Safari"	Laurie Elliott	February 24, 2011	October 18, 2010	321	N/A
76	22	"Rapa-Phooey!"	Shelley Scarrow	March 2, 2011	October 25, 2010	322	N/A
77	23	"Awwwwww, Drumheller"	Nicole Demerse	March 10, 2011	November 1, 2010	323	N/A
78	24	"TDWT Aftermath IV: Hawaiian Style"	Alex Ganetakos	March 20, 2011	November 1, 2010	324	N/A
79	25	"Planes, Trains & Hot Air Mobiles"	Shelley Scarrow	March 27, 2011	November 8, 2010	325	N/A
80	26	"Hawaiian Punch" "Aloha! Finale!"	Alex Ganetakos	April 24, 2011	November 15, 2010	326	1.82

=== Season 4: Revenge of the Island (2012) ===
No. overall	No. in season	Title	Written by	Original air date	U.S. air date	Prod. code	U.S. viewers (millions)
81	1	"Bigger! Badder! Brutal-er!"	Alex Ganetakos	January 5, 2012	June 5, 2012	401	3.3
82	2	"Truth or Laser Shark"	Jenn Engels	January 12, 2012	June 12, 2012	402	N/A
83	3	"Ice Ice Baby"	Laurie Elliott	January 19, 2012	June 19, 2012	403	N/A
84	4	"Finders Creepers"	Charles Johnston	January 26, 2012	June 26, 2012	404	1.85
85	5	"Backstabbers Ahoy!"	Scott Oleszkowicz	February 2, 2012	July 3, 2012	405	N/A
86	6	"Runaway Model"	Alex Nussbaum	February 9, 2012	July 10, 2012	406	N/A
87	7	"A Mine is a Terrible Thing to Waste"	Eliza Crosland	February 16, 2012	July 17, 2012	407	N/A
88	8	"The Treasure Island of Dr. McLean"	Laurie Elliott	February 23, 2012	July 24, 2012	408	N/A
89	9	"Grand Chef Auto"	Jeremy Winkels	March 1, 2012	July 31, 2012	409	N/A
90	10	"Up, Up & Away in My Pitiful Balloon"	Richard Clark	March 8, 2012	August 14, 2012	410	N/A
91	11	"Eat, Puke & Be Wary"	Alex Nussbaum	March 22, 2012	August 21, 2012	411	N/A
92	12	"The Enchanted Franken-Forest"	Laurie Elliott	March 29, 2012	August 28, 2012	412	N/A
93	13	"Brain vs. Brawn: The Ultimate Showdown"	Alex Ganetakos	April 12, 2012	August 28, 2012	413	N/A

=== Total Drama All-Stars ===
Chris and Chef celebrating the 100th episode of the series.

No. overall	No. in season	Title	Written by	U.S. air date	Canadian air date	Prod. code	US viewers (millions)
94	1	"Heroes vs. Villains"	Alex Ganetakos	September 10, 2013	January 9, 2014	501	2.11 Elimination: Lindsay
95	2	"Evil Dread"	Terry McGurrin	September 17, 2013	January 9, 2014	502	1.60 Elimination: Lightning
96	3	"Saving Private Leechball"	Alex Ganetakos	September 24, 2013	January 16, 2014	503	1.56 Elimination: Jo
97	4	"Food Fright"	Laurie Elliott	October 1, 2013	January 23, 2014	504	1.57 Elimination: Sam
98	5	"Moon Madness"	Ed MacDonald	October 8, 2013	January 30, 2014	505	1.51
99	6	"No One Eggspects the Spanish Opposition"	Terry McGurrin	October 15, 2013	February 6, 2014	506	1.51 Elimination: Heather
100	7	"Suckers Punched"	Laurie Elliott	October 22, 2013	February 13, 2014	507	1.45 Elimination: Sierra
101	8	"You Regotta Be Kidding Me"	Ed MacDonald	October 29, 2013	February 20, 2014	508	1.19 Elimination: Duncan
102	9	"Zeek and Ye Shall Find"	Terry McGurrin	November 5, 2013	February 27, 2014	509	1.37 Elimination: Cameron
103	10	"The Obsta-kill Course"	Laurie Elliott	November 12, 2013	March 6, 2014	510	1.55 Elimination: Alejandro
104	11	"Sundae Muddy Sundae"	Ed MacDonald	November 19, 2013	March 13, 2014	511	1.55 Elimination: Courtney
105	12	"The Bold & the Booty-ful"	Alex Ganetakos & Terry McGurrin	November 26, 2013	March 20, 2014	512	1.75 Elimination: Gwen and Scott
106	13	"The Final Wreck-ening"	Alex Ganetakos	December 3, 2013	March 27, 2014	513	1.84 Runner-Up: Zoey/Mike Winner: Mike/Zoey

=== Total Drama Pahkitew Island ===
No. overall	No. in season	Title	Written by	U.S. air date	Canadian air date	Prod. code	US viewers (millions)
107	14	"So, Uh, This Is My Team?"	Terry McGurrin	July 7, 2014	September 4, 2014	601	2.06 Elimination: Beardo
108	15	"I Love You, Grease Pig!"	Laurie Elliott	July 7, 2014	September 4, 2014	602	Elimination: Leonard
109	16	"Twinning Isn't Everything"	Ed MacDonald	July 8, 2014	September 11, 2014	603	Elimination: Amy
110	17	"I Love You, I Love You Knots"	Miles Smith	July 9, 2014	September 18, 2014	604	1.88 Elimination: Rondey
111	18	"A Blast from the Past"	Laurie Elliott	July 10, 2014	September 25, 2014	605	Elimination: Samey
112	19	"Mo' Monkey, Mo' Problems"	Ed MacDonald	July 11, 2014	October 2, 2014	606	Quit: Ella
113	20	"This is the Pits!"	Miles Smith	July 14, 2014	October 9, 2014	607	N/A
114	21	"Three Zones & a Baby"	Laurie Elliott	July 14, 2014	October 16, 2014	608	Elimination: Topher
115	22	"Hurl & Go Seek"	Terry McGurrin	July 15, 2014	October 23, 2014	609	Elimination: Dave
116	23	"Scarlett Fever"	Miles Smith	July 16, 2014	October 30, 2014	610	Elimination: Scarlett and Max
117	24	"Sky Fall"	Alice Prodanou	July 17, 2014	November 6, 2014	611	1.59 Elimination: Jasmine
118	25	"Pahk'd with Talent"	Alex Ganetakos	July 18, 2014	November 13, 2014	612	Elimination: Sugar
119	26	"Lies, Cries & One Big Prize"	Terry McGurrin	July 18, 2014	November 20, 2014	613	Runner-Up: Shawn/Sky Winner: Sky/Shawn

=== Season 6: Island (2023–24) ===
No. overall	No. in season	Title	Written by	Original air date	U.S. air date	Prod. code	U.S. viewers (millions)
120	1	"Meet the Victims"	Jennifer Pertsch	October 21, 2023	June 1, 2024	101	0.111
121	2	"Pirates of the Cabbage'an"	Terry McGurrin	October 21, 2023	June 8, 2024	102	0.141
122	3	"Drown Town Abbey"	Sam Ruano	October 28, 2023	June 15, 2024	103	0.120
123	4	"Numbskull Island"	Miles G. Smith	October 28, 2023	June 22, 2024	104	0.106
124	5	"Jurassic Fart"	Neha Kohli	November 4, 2023	June 29, 2024	105	0.050
125	6	"The Launchback of Notre Game"	Laurie Elliott	November 4, 2023	July 6, 2024	106	0.119
126	7	"Severe Eggs and Pains"	Nigel Downer	November 11, 2023	July 13, 2024	107	0.125
127	8	"The Wheel of Vomit"	Andrew Harrison	November 11, 2023	July 20, 2024	108	0.054
128	9	"Paddle Field Earth"	Ben Joseph	November 18, 2023	July 27, 2024	109	0.145
129	10	"The Truth, The Pole Truth and Nothing But the Truth"	Tony Tran	November 18, 2023	August 3, 2024	110	0.114
130	11	"Tortoise Rigamortis"	Miles G. Smith	November 25, 2023	August 10, 2024	111	0.116
131	12	"Caved by the Bell"	Andrew Harrison	November 25, 2023	August 17, 2024	112	0.167
132	13	"Magma Cum Laude"	Neha Kohli	December 2, 2023	August 24, 2024	113	TBA

=== Part 2 ===
No. overall	No. in season	Title	Written by	Original air date	U.S. air date	Prod. code	U.S. viewers (millions)
133	14	"The Pink Painter Strikes Again"	Andrew Harrison	March 3, 2024	May 31, 2025	114	0.073
134	15	"Taking It to the Rim Reaper"	Neha Kohli	March 3, 2024	June 7, 2025	115	0.070
135	16	"You Poor Saps"	Miles G. Smith	March 10, 2024	June 14, 2025	116	0.049
136	17	"Choosin' for a Bruisin'"	Laurie Elliott	March 10, 2024	June 21, 2025	117	0.041
137	18	"Ice to Beat You"	Nigel Downer	March 17, 2024	June 28, 2025	118	0.047
138	19	"Canoe Believe It?"	Amanda McNeice	March 24, 2024	July 5, 2025	119	TBA
139	20	"Fun Fight at the O'Cake Corral"	Tony Tran	March 24, 2024	July 12, 2025	120	0.062
140	21	"Haulin' n' Ballin'"	Andrew Harrison	March 31, 2024	July 19, 2025	121	0.058
141	22	"Breaking Up Is Hard to Do"	Amanda McNeice	March 31, 2024	July 26, 2025	122	0.060
142	23	"Circling the Drain"	Andrew Harrison	April 7, 2024	August 2, 2025	123	0.039
143	24	"Working K9 to 5"	Raf Antonio	April 7, 2024	August 9, 2025	124	0.070
144	25	"Off the Hook!"	Miles G. Smith	April 14, 2024	August 16, 2025	125	0.048
145	26	"Soar Losers"	Terry McGurrin	April 14, 2024	August 23, 2025	126	0.074

== Spin-offs ==
=== The Ridonculous Race ===
No.	Title	Written by	Canadian air date	U.S. air date	Prod. code	US viewers (millions)
1	"None Down, Eighteen to Go – Part 1"	Alex Ganetakos	January 4, 2016	September 7, 2015	701	1.60
2	"None Down, Eighteen to Go – Part 2"	Terry McGurrin	January 5, 2016	September 7, 2015	702	1.47
3	"French is an Eiffel Language"	Laurie Elliott	January 6, 2016	September 8, 2015	703	1.19
4	"Mediterranean Homesick Blues"	Kurt Firla	January 7, 2016	September 9, 2015	704	1.33
5	"Bjorken Telephone"	Terry McGurrin	January 11, 2016	September 10, 2015	705	1.37
6	"Brazilian Pain Forest"	Laurie Elliott	January 12, 2016	September 11, 2015	706	1.05
7	"A Tisket, a Casket, I'm Gonna Blow a Gasket"	Terry McGurrin	January 13, 2016	September 14, 2015	707	1.09
8	"Hawaiian Honeyruin"	Shelley Scarrow	January 14, 2016	September 15, 2015	708	1.01
9	"Hello & Dubai"	Miles Smith	January 18, 2016	September 16, 2015	709	1.09
10	"New Beijinging"	L. Elliott / M. Smith	January 19, 2016	September 17, 2015	710	1.18
11	"I Love Ridonc & Roll"	Miles Smith	January 20, 2016	September 18, 2015	711	1.08
12	"My Way or Zimbabwe"	Shelley Scarrow	January 21, 2016	September 21, 2015	712	1.19
13	"The Shawshank Ridonc-tion"	Terry McGurrin	January 25, 2016	September 22, 2015	713	1.19
14	"Down & Outback"	Miles Smith	January 26, 2016	September 23, 2015	714	1.19
15	"Maori or Less"	Shelley Scarrow	January 27, 2016	September 24, 2015	715	1.29
16	"Little Bull on the Prairie"	Meghan Read	January 28, 2016	September 25, 2015	716	1.18
17	"Lord of the Ring Toss"	Terry McGurrin	February 1, 2016	September 28, 2015	717	1.28
18	"Got Venom"	Miles Smith	February 2, 2016	September 29, 2015	718	1.18
19	"Dude Buggies"	Craig Martin	February 3, 2016	September 30, 2015	719	1.14
20	"El Bunny Supremo"	Shelley Scarrow	February 4, 2016	October 1, 2015	720	1.23
21	"Ca-Noodling"	Meghan Read	February 8, 2016	October 2, 2015	721	1.16
22	"How Deep Is Your Love"	Terry McGurrin	February 9, 2016	October 5, 2015	722	1.28
23	"Darjeel with It"	Miles Smith	February 10, 2016	October 6, 2015	723	0.99
24	"Last Tango in Buenos Aires"	Craig Martin	February 11, 2016	October 7, 2015	724	1.18
25	"Bahamarama" (Part 1)	Alex Ganetakos	February 15, 2016	October 8, 2015	725	1.29
26	"A Million Ways to Lose a Million Dollars" (Part 2)	Terry McGurrin	February 15, 2016	October 9, 2015	726	1.14

=== Total DramaRama ===
Season	Episodes	Originally released	
Season	Episodes	First released	Last released
1	51	September 1, 2018	November 30, 2019
2	51	January 11, 2020	March 27, 2021
3	50	April 3, 2021	July 22, 2022
Special		April 15, 2023	

== Home media ==
Season	DVD release dates		
Season	Region 1	Region 4	
1	August 18, 2009	May 5, 2010	September 29, 2010
2	—N/a	November 2, 2011	July 4, 2012
3	—N/a	April 3, 2013	August 7, 2013
4	—N/a	October 8, 2014	
5	—N/a	March 4, 2015	July 8, 2015
