= Duncan Disorderly =

Duncan Disorderly, a play on the phrase drunk and disorderly, may refer to:

- Duncan Ferguson (born 1971), Scottish footballer
- A character played by Steve Coogan in his early stand-up routines
- A 2019 episode of Total DramaRama
