= Total Drama Presents: The Ridonculous Race =

Animated spoof Canadian television series

- Genre: Animated comedy; Reality competition
- Created by: Tom McGillis; Jennifer Pertsch
- Developed by: Alex Ganetakos; Terry McGurrin
- Written by: Terry McGurrin; Alex Ganetakos; Laurie Elliott; Kurt Firla; Shelley Scarrow; Miles Smith; Meghan Read; Craig Martin
- Directed by: Chad Hicks; Keith Oliver
- Presented by: Terry McGurrin
- Country of origin: Canada
- Original language: English
- No. of seasons: 1
- No. of episodes: 26

Production
- Executive producers: Tom McGillis; Jennifer Pertsch; George Elliot; Brian Irving; Alex Ganetakos; Terry McGurrin
- Producers: Wren Errington; Christine Thompson
- Running time: 20 minutes, 32 seconds
- Production company: Fresh TV

Original release
- Network: Cartoon Network
- Release: January 4 – February 15, 2016

Related
- Total Drama; Total DramaRama

Total Drama Presents: The Ridonculous Race (also known as Total Drama: The Ridonculous Race or simply The Ridonculous Race) is a Canadian animated television series which lampoons the conventions commonly found in reality television (specifically The Amazing Race). The show is a spin-off of the original Total Drama series created in 2007 and the second series created as part of the overall franchise. The series is created by Fresh TV Inc. and distributed by Cake Entertainment. The series originally premiered in the United States on Cartoon Network on September 7, 2015, while in Canada, the series premiered on the Canadian version of Cartoon Network on January 4, 2016. It also aired on ABC3 in Australia, starting December 23, 2019, and CBBC (via BBC iPlayer) in the United Kingdom. The series consists of 26 episodes.

== Plot ==
There are 36 racers, divided into teams of two, who visit a different country or location in every episode and perform in "legs". Teams must race to the "Chill Zone", the finish line for each leg taking on the form of a gold "Carpet of Completion". The first team to arrive there have the advantage of starting early, while the team finishing last may face elimination. In each of the 26 episodes, each team is required to press a button on any "Don-box" they meet to receive clues that let them decide which challenge they will have to complete.

Each challenge contains a task that teams must complete to advance throughout the leg. Challenges come in four different types: "All-In", which has both members of each team complete a task together; "Botch-or-Watch", which requires one member of each team, usually the team member who did not take on a prior challenge's component, to perform a task; "Either-or", in which teams are given a choice between two different tasks that have to be completed in the same manner as an "All-In"; and "Superteam", in which multiple teams complete together as a team to finish a task.

== Characters and cast ==
Total Drama Presents: The Ridonculous Race has 32 brand new contestants and four contestants from the original Total Drama series. Unlike the original series, contestants compete in teams of two throughout the season, resulting in a total of 18 teams.

Contestant	Voice	Team name	Finish		
Contestant	Voice	Team name	Finish	Placement	Episode
Leonard	Clé Bennett	LARPers	1st eliminated (in Sahara Desert, Morocco)	18th place	2
Tammy	Nicki Burke	LARPers	1st eliminated (in Sahara Desert, Morocco)	18th place	2
Gerry	David Huband	Tennis Rivals	2nd eliminated (in Paris, France)	17th place	3
Pete	Adrian Truss	Tennis Rivals	2nd eliminated (in Paris, France)	17th place	3
Ellody	Emilie-Claire Barlow	Geniuses	3rd eliminated (in Calanque de Maubois, France)	16th place	4
Mary	Katie Griffin	Geniuses	3rd eliminated (in Calanque de Maubois, France)	16th place	4
Laurie	Emilie-Claire Barlow	Vegans	4th eliminated (in Rio de Janeiro, Brazil)	15th place	6
Miles	Katie Griffin	Vegans	4th eliminated (in Rio de Janeiro, Brazil)	15th place	6
Jen	Ashley Botting	Fashion Bloggers	5th eliminated (in Transylvania, Romania)	14th place	7
Tom	Jeff Geddis	Fashion Bloggers	5th eliminated (in Transylvania, Romania)	14th place	7
Kelly	Julie Lemieux	Mother & Daughter	6th eliminated (in Dubai, United Arab Emirates)	13th place	9
Taylor	Bryn McAuley	Mother & Daughter	6th eliminated (in Dubai, United Arab Emirates)	13th place	9
Jay	Lyon Smith	Adversity Twins	7th eliminated (in Oulu, Finland)	12th place	11
Mickey	Lyon Smith	Adversity Twins	7th eliminated (in Oulu, Finland)	12th place	11
Chet	Darren Frost	Stepbrothers	8th/9th eliminated (in New Zealand)	11th place	14
Lorenzo	Carlos Díaz	Stepbrothers	8th/9th eliminated (in New Zealand)	11th place	14
Rock	Carlos Díaz	Rockers	8th/9th eliminated (in New Zealand)	10th place	14
Spud	Carter Hayden	Rockers	8th/9th eliminated (in New Zealand)	10th place	14
Dwayne	Neil Crone	Father & Son	10th eliminated (in Alberta, Canada)	9th place	16
Junior	Jacob Ewaniuk	Father & Son	10th eliminated (in Alberta, Canada)	9th place	16
Noah	Carter Hayden	Reality TV Pros	11th eliminated (in Flores, Indonesia)	8th place	18
Owen	Scott McCord	Reality TV Pros	11th eliminated (in Flores, Indonesia)	8th place	18
Crimson	Stacey DePass	Goths	12th eliminated (in Acapulco, Mexico)	7th place	20
Ennui	Carter Hayden	Goths	12th eliminated (in Acapulco, Mexico)	7th place	20
Brody	Returned to game		13th eliminated (in Cần Thơ, Vietnam)		21
Geoff	Returned to game		13th eliminated (in Cần Thơ, Vietnam)		21
Ryan	Joseph Motiki	Daters/Haters	14th eliminated (in Darjeeling, India)	6th place	23
Stephanie	Nicki Burke	Daters/Haters	14th eliminated (in Darjeeling, India)	6th place	23
Carrie	Kristin Fairlie	Best Friends	15th eliminated (Medically evacuated) (in Buenos Aires, Argentina)	5th place	24
Devin	Jeff Geddis	Best Friends	15th eliminated (Medically evacuated) (in Buenos Aires, Argentina)	5th place	24
Emma	Stacey DePass	Sisters	16th eliminated (in Nassau, The Bahamas)	4th place	25
Kitty	Stephanie Anne Mills	Sisters	16th eliminated (in Nassau, The Bahamas)	4th place	25
Jacques	Scott McCord	Ice Dancers	17th eliminated (in New York City, New York, United States)	3rd place	26
Josee	Julie Lemieux	Ice Dancers	17th eliminated (in New York City, New York, United States)	3rd place	26
Brody	Scott McCord	Surfer Dudes	Runners-up/Winners (in New York City, New York, United States)	2nd place/1st place	26
Geoff	Dan Petronijevic	Surfer Dudes	Runners-up/Winners (in New York City, New York, United States)	2nd place/1st place	26
MacArthur	Evany Rosen	Police Cadets	Winners/Runners-up (in New York City, New York, United States)	1st place/2nd place	26
Sanders	Nicole Stamp	Police Cadets	Winners/Runners-up (in New York City, New York, United States)	1st place/2nd place	26

Quebec Version:

Contestant	Voice	Team name	Finish		
Contestant	Voice	Team name	Finish	Placement	Episode
Léonard	Marc St-Martin	Les joueurs grandeur nature	1st eliminated (in Sahara Desert, Morocco)	18th place	2
Heidi	Marika Lhoumeau	Les joueurs grandeur nature	1st eliminated (in Sahara Desert, Morocco)	18th place	2
Gerry	François L'écuyer	Les adversaires de tennis	2nd eliminated (in Paris, France)	17th place	3
Pierre	Philippe Martin	Les adversaires de tennis	2nd eliminated (in Paris, France)	17th place	3
Élodie	Natalie Hamel-Roy	Les génies	3rd eliminated (in Calanque de Maubois, France)	16th place	4
Marie	Éveline Gélinas	Les génies	3rd eliminated (in Calanque de Maubois, France)	16th place	4
Laurie	Natalie Hamel-Roy	Les végés	4th eliminated (in Rio de Janeiro, Brazil)	15th place	6
Michèle	Catherine Proulx-Lemay	Les végés	4th eliminated (in Rio de Janeiro, Brazil)	15th place	6
Jen	Élisabeth Lenormand	Les blogueurs de mode	5th eliminated (in Transylvania, Romania)	14th place	7
Tom	Nicholas Savard L'Herbier	Les blogueurs de mode	5th eliminated (in Transylvania, Romania)	14th place	7
Karine	Marika Lhoumeau	La fille et la mère	6th eliminated (in Dubai, United Arab Emirates)	13th place	9
Charlotte	Éveline Gélinas	La fille et la mère	6th eliminated (in Dubai, United Arab Emirates)	13th place	9
Alain	Kevin Houle	Les jumeaux de malheur	7th eliminated (in Oulu, Finland)	12th place	11
Maxime	Kevin Houle	Les jumeaux de malheur	7th eliminated (in Oulu, Finland)	12th place	11
Serge	Benoît Éthier	Les demi-frères	8th/9th eliminated (in New Zealand)	11th place	14
Lorenzo	Claude Gagnon	Les demi-frères	8th/9th eliminated (in New Zealand)	11th place	14
Roch	Alexandre Fortin	Les rockeurs	8th/9th eliminated (in New Zealand)	10th place	14
Bob	Christian Perrault	Les rockeurs	8th/9th eliminated (in New Zealand)	10th place	14
Denis	Patrick Chouinard	Le fils et le père	10th eliminated (in Alberta, Canada)	9th place	16
Denis Junior	Julie Beauchemin	Le fils et le père	10th eliminated (in Alberta, Canada)	9th place	16
Lucas	Philippe Martin	Les professionnels de la téléréalité	11th eliminated (in Flores, Indonesia)	8th place	18
Gontran	Patrick Chouinard	Les professionnels de la téléréalité	11th eliminated (in Flores, Indonesia)	8th place	18
Cramoisi	Camille Cyr-Desmarais	Les gothiques	12th eliminated (in Acapulco, Mexico)	7th place	20
Lassitude	Claude Gagnon	Les gothiques	12th eliminated (in Acapulco, Mexico)	7th place	20
Brice	Returned to game		13th eliminated (in Cần Thơ, Vietnam)		21
J.F.	Returned to game		13th eliminated (in Cần Thơ, Vietnam)		21
Antoine	Alexandre Fortin	Les amoureux	14th eliminated (in Darjeeling, India)	6th place	23
Stéphanie	Myriam de Verge	Les amoureux	14th eliminated (in Darjeeling, India)	6th place	23
Charlie	Geneviève Désilets	Les meilleurs amis	15th eliminated (Medically evacuated) (in Buenos Aires, Argentina)	5th place	24
Devin	Marc St-Martin	Les meilleurs amis	15th eliminated (Medically evacuated) (in Buenos Aires, Argentina)	5th place	24
Emma	Camille Cyr-Desmarais	Les sœurs	16th eliminated (in Nassau, The Bahamas)	4th place	25
Cathou	Rachel Graton	Les sœurs	16th eliminated (in Nassau, The Bahamas)	4th place	25
Jacques	Benoît Éthier	Les patineurs artistiques	17th eliminated (in New York City, New York, United States)	3rd place	26
Josée	Fanny Rainville	Les patineurs artistiques	17th eliminated (in New York City, New York, United States)	3rd place	26
Brice	Christian Perrault	Les partenaires de surf	Runners-up/Winners (in New York City, New York, United States)	2nd place/1st place	26
J.F.	Sébastien Rajotte	Les partenaires de surf	Runners-up/Winners (in New York City, New York, United States)	2nd place/1st place	26
MacGuire	Julie Beauchemin	Les cadettes de police	Winners/Runners-up (in New York City, New York, United States)	1st place/2nd place	26
Santerre	Rose-Maïté Erkoreka	Les cadettes de police	Winners/Runners-up (in New York City, New York, United States)	1st place/2nd place	26

== Elimination table ==
This table summarizes the order in which the teams have ranked overall throughout the series. The teams are listed in reverse order of elimination.

Team		Label	Position (by leg)																									
Team		Label	1	2	3	4	5	6	7	8	9	10	11	12	13	14^{7}	15	16	17	18	19	20	21	22	23	24	25	26
1st/2nd	MacArthur & Sanders	Police Cadets	3rd	2nd	1st	3rd	11th	13th	7th	8th	8th	5th	2nd	1st	11th^{⊂}_{⋑}	9th	3rd	5th	7th	6th	3rd	1st	1st^	5th	2nd	2nd	3rd	1st/2nd
2nd/1st	Brody & Geoff	Surfer Dudes	13th	6th	3rd	15th	5th	4th	8th	1st	9th	6th	5th	2nd	8th	8th	6th	1st	1st	7th	5th	6th	6th				1st	2nd/1st
3rd	Jacques & Josee	Ice Dancers	1st	3rd	2nd	1st	3rd	1st	1st	3rd	4th	4th	4th	11th	10th^{⊂}_{⋑}	1st	1st	7th	2nd	2nd	6th	2nd^{8}	1st^	1st^{9}	4th^{10}	1st	2nd	3rd^{12}
4th	Emma & Kitty	Sisters	8th	11th	10th	9th	10th	7th	3rd	5th	1st	3rd	7th	5th	4th	4th	8th	6th	3rd	4th	4th	3rd	4th	4th	1st	4th	4th	
5th	Carrie & Devin	Best Friends	2nd	1st	4th	14th	7th	11th	10th	2nd	12th	10th	9th	4th	1st	7th	2nd	3rd	5th	5th	7th	4th	5th+	3rd	3rd	3rd		
6th	Ryan & Stephanie	Daters / Haters	5th	5th	8th	6th	6th	10th	13th	13th	5th	1st	3rd	3rd	6th	3rd	5th	2nd	8th^{⊂}_{⋑}	3rd	2nd	4th	1st^	2nd	5th			
7th	Crimson & Ennui	Goths	18th	14th	13th	8th	1st	2nd	12th^{6}	10th	7th	8th	10th	8th	7th	2nd	4th	4th	6th	1st	1st	7th						
8th	Noah & Owen	Reality TV Pros	6th	8th	16th^{1}	2nd	4th	12th	2nd	4th	2nd	2nd	11th	6th	5th	6th	9th	8th	4th	8th								
9th	Dwayne & Junior	Father & Son	4th	17th	5th	4th^{2}	8th	6th	6th	6th	6th	11th	6th	10th	3rd	5th	7th	9th										
10th	Rock & Spud	Rockers	11th	9th	15th	13th	14th	14th	9th	11th	11th	12th	1st	9th	9th	10th												
11th	Chet & Lorenzo	Stepbrothers	16th	15th	6th	7th	9th	5th	4th	7th	10th	7th	8th	7th	2nd	11th												
12th	Jay & Mickey	Adversity Twins	14th	12th	12th	12th	12th	7th	11th	9th	3rd	9th	12th															
13th	Kelly & Taylor	Mother & Daughter	12th	13th	11th	10th	13th^{4}	3rd	5th	12th	13th																	
14th	Tom & Jen	Fashion Bloggers	10th	10th	7th	5th^{3}	2nd	9th	14th																			
15th	Laurie & Miles	Vegans	9th	16th	14th	11th	15th	15th^{5}																				
16th	Ellody & Mary	Geniuses	7th	7th	9th	16th																						
17th	Gerry & Pete	Tennis Rivals	17th	4th	17th																							
18th	Leonard & Tammy	LARPers	15th	18th																								

=== Key ===
Each column shows the results of the leg of the race from that episode of the series.

- A red team placement indicates the team was eliminated.
- A brown team placement indicates the team withdrew from the race.
- An underlined blue team placement indicates the team came in last on a non-elimination leg.
- A brown ⊃ or a cyan ⋑ indicates that the team found a Boomerang and could choose a team to repeat the previous task, while a ⊂ or ⋐ indicates the team who received it.
- Matching coloured symbols (pink + and teal ^) indicate teams who worked together during the leg as a result of a Superteam twist.

Notes

1. Noah & Owen initially arrived 11th, but were issued a 20-minute penalty for failing to ride their cheese wheel down the river and roll it to the Chill Zone as instructed, since Owen had consumed the whole cheese. Five teams checked in during their penalty time, dropping them to 16th.
2. Dwayne & Junior initially arrived 1st, but were issued a 20-minute penalty for Dwayne reading the Travel-Tip before reuniting with Junior on the beach. Three teams (excluding Tom & Jen) checked in during their penalty time, dropping them to 4th.
3. Tom & Jen initially arrived 2nd, but were issued a 20-minute penalty for arriving at Calanque de Maubois by yacht instead of train as instructed. Two teams checked in during their penalty time, dropping them to 5th (after Dwayne & Junior).
4. Kelly & Taylor initially arrived 7th, but were issued a one-hour penalty for Taylor failing to follow Kelly back through the geyser field after incorrectly repeating the Icelandic phrase during the All-In, when she was instructed to do so. Six teams checked in during their penalty time, dropping them to 13th.
5. Laurie & Miles initially arrived 1st, but were issued a 30-minute penalty for Miles making both components of the Brazilian carnival costume during the All-In, when she and Laurie were instructed to make one each. All other teams checked in during their penalty time, dropping them to last and resulting in their elimination.
6. Crimson & Ennui initially arrived 6th, but were issued a 10-minute penalty for switching positions during the All-In. Six teams checked in during their penalty time, dropping them to 12th.
7. Leg 14 was a double-elimination leg, where the last two teams to reach the Chill Zone were eliminated.
8. Jacques & Josee initially arrived 1st, but were issued a 10-minute penalty for arriving at the Chill Zone on foot, when they were instructed to ride burros there. MacArthur & Sanders checked in during this time, dropping them to 2nd.
9. Jacques & Josee initially arrived 1st, but were issued a 30-minute penalty for failing to collect a ball from the bottom of the borehole as instructed, since they had instead stolen the ball from Emma & Kitty while suspended on the way down. This did not affect their final placement.
10. Jacques & Josee initially arrived 1st, but were issued a one-hour penalty for disconnecting the trailing carriages of the train that transported them to the Chill Zone. Three teams checked in during this time, dropping them to 4th.
11. In Leg 24, Carrie & Devin checked in the Chill Zone in 3rd place and were declared safe. While they celebrated, trailing team Emma & Kitty accidentally knocked Devin off the cliff where the Chill Zone was located after losing control of their emu from the Botch-or-Watch. Carrie & Devin were forced to withdraw from the race due to Devin's injuries and had to choose a previously eliminated team to replace them. Brody & Geoff were chosen to return to the race.
12. Jacques & Josee were last to arrive at the mid-point Chill Zone in Central Park and were eliminated in the middle part of the Final Leg.
13. The Final Leg has two endings, depending on the location of the audience. Brody & Geoff are the winners in Australia, Brazil, Bulgaria, Canada (Crave), Denmark, France, Israel, Latin America, Netherlands, Norway, Poland, Portugal, Romania (Megamax), Russia, Spain, the United Kingdom (BBC iPlayer), and the USA. MacArthur & Sanders are the winners in Canada, Croatia, Hungary, Italy, Romania, and the USA (Netflix).

== Production ==
Production took place from January 1, 2014 to October 30, 2015. It was announced that Alex Ganetakos was producing the show, Terry McGurrin was writing the screenplay, and that Chad Hicks was directing. The new host Don was revealed in a Fresh TV post in October 2014. It was confirmed that 26 episodes would be picked up for the show and that it would air sometime the same year. However, one of the producers, Alex Ganetakos, stated that many Ridonculous Race seasons are possible if the first season is successful. In June 2015, the entire first episode was leaked online, revealing all of the characters three months before Fresh TV could release their designs on their website.

=== Casting ===
Even though some of the characters from the main series do make appearances, the spin-off series has a predominantly new cast. In fact, there are only four characters returning from the original series, while the rest are brand new characters. Kristin Fairlie, the voice actor for the character Bridgette from the original series, was cast to voice one of the new contestants, Carrie. Scott McCord (voice of characters Owen and Trent in the original series) as well as Carter Hayden (voice of Noah in the original) were also revealed to be returning to the cast, and were seen in the recording studio together. It was later confirmed that the actors were indeed going to voice the characters Owen and Noah. It was eventually revealed that the first pair is to be the aforementioned character Carrie and her best friend Devin, who is played by Jeff Geddis. In February, the second pair was revealed: Stephanie and Ryan. The two are voiced by Nicki Burke of Dead Rising 2 and Joseph Motiki, from Rescue Heroes. In a new promotion by Cake Entertainment, Geoff was also revealed to be among the returning cast, teamed up with Brody, one of his friends from home. The father-son team of Dwayne and Dwayne Jr. was also revealed.

In June, a pair of goths called Ennui and Crimson, and Mary and Ellody, two close friends who are dubbed the "Geniuses", were revealed with news that returning voice actors Carter Hayden and Emilie-Claire Barlow (voice of Courtney) from the original series would play them. A week later, the fourth pair to be released are Emma and Kitty, who are Asian sisters with opposite personalities, referred to as the "Sisters". A week later, another team was confirmed; Chet and Lorenzo, known as "the Stepbrothers". Next to be revealed are twins Mickey and Jay, called "the Adversity Twins", who are plagued with countless phobias, allergies, injuries, disorders, immunities, and ailments. The rest of the teams were all revealed shortly thereafter.

== Episodes ==
No.	Title	Written by	Canadian air date	U.S. air date	Prod. code	US viewers (millions)
1	"None Down, Eighteen to Go – Part 1"	Alex Ganetakos	January 4, 2016	September 7, 2015	701	1.60
Total Drama returns with a new host Don and 18 teams of two. All 36 characters are then paired off into 18 teams of two. They all start off in Toronto, Ontario, Canada and must race around the world for a chance at $1 million. Their first challenge is to either climb the stairs of the CN Tower or take the elevator and do a sky-walk around the tower (Scares). Either-Or: Stairs or Scares Stairs: Adversity Twins, Daters Scares: Fashion Bloggers, Best Friends, Tennis Rivals, Sisters, Vegans, Reality TV Pros, Rockers, Geniuses, LARPers, Goths, Mother & Daughter Switch: Father & Son, Surfer Dudes, Police Cadets, Ice Dancers, Stepbrothers (All Scares to Stairs)
2	"None Down, Eighteen to Go – Part 2"	Terry McGurrin	January 5, 2016	September 7, 2015	702	1.47
All eighteen teams travel to the first destination, Morocco in the scorching hot Sahara Desert Their second challenge is to choose 5 spices from a local kiosk then take them across the Sahara on camels and then eat them in a Moroccan stew at a restaurant. LARPers Tammy and Leonard tried to buy the spices with "Dragon Coins", much to the kiosk owner's disbelief. Best friends Carrie and Devin reach the Chill Zone first, while the LARPers Tammy and Leonard come in last place after they tried to use magic on the other teams and thus become the first team eliminated. All-In: The Spice is Right Botch or Watch: Just Stew It Botch or Watch Performers: Sanders, Devin, Josee, Crimson, Ryan, Brody, Mary, Owen, Chet, Spud, Kelly, Jay, Emma, Tom, Pete, Leonard, Miles, and Dwayne
3	"French is an Eiffel Language"	Laurie Elliott	January 6, 2016	September 8, 2015	703	1.19
The final Seventeen teams now travel to Paris, France, where they all go to the Eiffel Tower to draw pictures of their partners, explore the catacombs rowing down the river on giant wheels of Roquefort cheese, and make their way to the Louvre, where the Chill Zone is located. The Police Cadets arrive first, while Tennis Rivals, Gerry and Pete, get last place due to their slow pace and become the second team eliminated, barely saving the Reality TV Pros, Noah and Owen, from elimination despite receiving a time penalty for Owen eating the cheese wheel they were supposed to ride on. Also during this the Dater’s relationship started to deteriorate. Botch or Watch: Caricature All-Ins: Catacomb Cheese Hunt, Cheese Rowing Botch or Watch Performers: Carrie, Jacques, Ellody, Noah, Stephanie, MacArthur, Geoff, Kitty, Taylor, Lorenzo, Mickey, Ennui, Junior, Jen, Rock, Gerry, and Laurie
4	"Mediterranean Homesick Blues"	Kurt Firla	January 7, 2016	September 9, 2015	704	1.33
Sixteen remaining teams now head south to Calanque de Maubois on the coast of the Mediterranean Sea. Their challenge is to swim with sharks, build a sandcastle exactly a replica of the Palace of Versailles and then make their way to Iceland on speedboats. The Ice Dancers take first place, while Surfer Dudes Geoff and Brody manage to stay in the race after struggling in the shark challenge. The Geniuses are 16th in the end after working too hard on a sand equation. Botch or Watch: Who Wants to Swim With Sharks All-In: Sandpalace of Versailles Botch or Watch Performers: Devin, Brody, Sanders, Josee, Dwayne, Chet, Ryan, Tom, Mary, Rock (supposed to be Spud), Crimson, Owen, Emma, Miles, Jay, and Kelly
5	"Bjorken Telephone"	Terry McGurrin	January 11, 2016	September 10, 2015	705	1.37
Fifteen remaining teams are now in Iceland, where they first must run through a geyser field and repeat an Icelandic phrase, after which they must either eat an Icelandic feast or look for fossils in a cave. The Goths are the first team to finish, while the Mother & Daughter team, Kelly and Taylor, receive a one-hour penalty, and the Vegans come in last after reluctantly eating meat. However, it is a non-elimination leg, so they are spared the elimination. All-In: Broken Icelandic Telephone Either-Or: Feast or Fossil Feast: Goths, Surfer Dudes, Rockers, Mother & Daughter, Daters, Reality TV Pros Fossil: Ice Dancers, Sisters, Fashion Bloggers, Police Cadets, Best Friends, Adversity Twins, Father & Son, Stepbrothers Switch: Vegans (Fossil to Feast)
6	"Brazilian Pain Forest"	Laurie Elliott	January 12, 2016	September 11, 2015	706	1.05
The final 15 remaining teams now travel to Rio de Janeiro, Brazil, where they must face a kitchen mitt full of painful bullet ants and prepare a costume for the Carnival. The Ice Dancers take first place once again. Meanwhile, despite being the first to arrive at the Chill Zone, the Vegans end up with a 30-minute penalty because Miles made all of the feather costume that gets them 15th and eliminated from the race. Botch or Watch: Bullet Ant Mitt All-Ins: Swing Your Butts to the Coconuts, Carnival Fashion, Hang Gliding Botch or Watch Performers: Laurie, Lorenzo, Chet, MacArthur, Mickey, Taylor, Spud, Jacques, Geoff, Ennui, Carrie, Stephanie, Jen, Noah, Junior, and Kitty (did not perform)
7	"A Tisket, a Casket, I'm Gonna Blow a Gasket"	Terry McGurrin	January 13, 2016	September 14, 2015	707	1.09
Fourteen remaining teams now travel to Transylvania, Romania Also known as the place of the dead. Their challenge is to transport themselves in coffins and then perform gymnastics. The Ice Dancers came in first once again. During the challenge, Noah develops a crush on competitor Emma. The Goths are penalized so they come in 12th instead. Daters Stephanie and Ryan begin to argue and are second-last to arrive, while Fashion Bloggers, Tom and Jen, are eliminated after reconciling from a fight over their blog. All-In: Lay to Rest Botch or Watch: Gymnastics Botch or Watch Performers: Josee, Chet, Owen, Kelly, Emma, Dwayne, Crimson, Sanders, Ryan, Jay, Devin, Rock, Tom, and Brody
8	"Hawaiian Honeyruin"	Shelley Scarrow	January 14, 2016	September 15, 2015	708	1.01
The thirteen remaining teams travel to Hawaii, where they dive for wedding rings and perform the traditional Hawaiian marriage of walking over hot coal. The Ice Dancers find a Lucky charm while Kelly tells her spoiled daughter off for her attitude. The Surfer Dudes, Geoff and Brody, come in first, while the Daters, now known as the Haters, fight throughout the challenge and come in last. They break up with one another before Don reveals it is another non-elimination leg. Botch or Watch: Diving for Wedding Rings All-In: Wedding Walk on Fire Botch or Watch Performers: Spud, Jacques, Kitty, Carrie, Geoff, MacArthur, Taylor, Stephanie, Mickey, Noah, Ennui, Junior, and Lorenzo All-In Grooms: Jacques, Josee, Brody, Devin, MacArthur, Lorenzo, Junior, Mickey, Owen, Kitty, Kelly, Ennui, Spud, and Ryan All-In Brides: Jacques, Josee, Geoff, Carrie, Sanders, Chet, Dwayne, Jay, Noah, Emma, Taylor, Crimson, Rock, and Stephanie
9	"Hello & Dubai"	Miles Smith	January 18, 2016	September 16, 2015	709	1.09
The thirteen remaining teams travel to the Burj Al Arab hotel in Dubai to either serve a tennis ball or clean windows (Squeegee). Owen and Noah form an alliance with the Sisters, Emma and Kitty, leading to the latter team finishing first, while Kelly's attempts to discipline her daughter Taylor end up getting them eliminated from the race. Either-Or: Serve or Squeegee Serve: Surfer Dudes, Best Friends, Stepbrothers, Goths, Daters/Haters, Adversity Twins, Rockers, Police Cadets Squeegee: Reality TV Pros, Sisters Switch: Father & Son, Mother & Daughter, Ice Dancers (All Serve to Squeegee)
10	"New Beijinging"	L. Elliott / M. Smith	January 19, 2016	September 17, 2015	710	1.18
The final twelve remaining teams now travel to Beijing, China, to see the Beijing National Stadium, eat local delicacies, and finally make their way to the Chill Zone located in the Great Wall of China. The Haters end up becoming the first team to arrive, coming in first place. The Ice Dancers' bad luck continues, while Noah and Emma grow closer together. The Rockers, Rock and Spud, come in last, but are safe because of another non-elimination leg. All-Ins: Crow's Nest Parachuting, Street Food Botch or Watch: Rickshaw Pulling Botch or Watch Performers: Josee, Sanders, Brody, Ryan, Emma, Owen, Spud (supposed to be Rock), Dwayne, Devin, Chet, Crimson, and Jay All-In Cooks: Ennui, Ryan, Mickey, Geoff, Chet, Josee, Emma, Owen, Spud, Junior, and Devin All-In Eaters: Crimson, Stephanie, Jay, Brody, Lorenzo, Jacques, Kitty, Noah, Rock, Dwayne, and Carrie Note: The Police Cadets were not seen during the Street Food challenge.
11	"I Love Ridonc & Roll"	Miles Smith	January 20, 2016	September 18, 2015	711	1.08
The twelve remaining teams now travel to Oulu, Finland, where they first must enter a sauna chamber and then play air guitar on stage. The Rockers manage to bounce into first place, while the Goths, Crimson and Ennui, lose their makeup, Josee finds out her lucky charm is cursed, and Noah nearly comes in last before being motivated by Owen. In the end, the Adversity Twins, Jay and Mickey, come in last after suffering from stage fright, including sabotage by Emma that caused them to be eliminated. All-In: Finnish Spa Day Botch or Watch: Air Out Your Rock-On Botch or Watch Performers: Noah, Mickey, Kitty, MacArthur, Junior, Ryan (supposed to be Stephanie), Jacques, Ennui, Spud, Carrie, Geoff and Lorenzo
12	"My Way or Zimbabwe"	Shelley Scarrow	January 21, 2016	September 21, 2015	712	1.19
The final eleven remaining teams now travel to Zimbabwe to take a selfie of them going over Victoria Falls and with a white rhino. The Ice Dancers travel back to Hawaii to break the curse, while Dwayne and Junior, become separated from each other. The Police Cadets, Sanders and MacArthur, win the leg. In the end, Dwayne reunites with his son, and the Ice Dancers end up coming in last after they arrive in Zimbabwe last. However, they are saved by a non-elimination leg, and they vow to take down the other teams. All-In: Selfie Safari
13	"The Shawshank Ridonc-tion"	Terry McGurrin	January 25, 2016	September 22, 2015	713	1.19
The eleven remaining teams head for Australia, where they must first enter Geelong Prison and then escape by using various methods possible. Both the Ice Dancers and the Police Cadets get a Boomerang (which sends back a team to repeat the previous challenge) and use it on each other. The Stepbrothers finally begin to get along, while Carrie tries to reveal her feelings for Devin, who later finds out his girlfriend Shelly has broken up with him. In the end, the Ice Dancers beat out the Cadets for last place, but another non-elimination round saves them. All-Ins: Geelong Jailbreak, Craft-a-Raft
14	"Down & Outback"	Miles Smith	January 26, 2016	September 23, 2015	714	1.19
The eleven remaining teams stay in Australia for a bunny hunt challenge. The Ice Dancers paint a bunny to fool the Police Cadets. They then fly their own gliders to New Zealand. The Goths adopt a bunny, which they name "Loki", for themselves. The Ice Dancers finally come back on top, while both the Stepbrothers and the Rockers end up 11th & 10th in a double elimination and are thus cut from the race. All-In: Bunny Bagging
15	"Maori or Less"	Shelley Scarrow	January 27, 2016	September 24, 2015	715	1.29
The final nine remaining teams start off in New Zealand and they all catch a train to either jump down (off) the Kawarau Bridge to catch a fish or jump around doing a Māori war dance. The Ice Dancers swiftly zoom into first place, while Emma and Noah become too distracted by each other, causing the Reality TV Pros to lose the game. Emma breaks off her relationship with Noah, much to the latter's shock. However, it was another non-elimination leg so they are still in the race. Either-Or: Jump Down or Jump Around Jump Down: Daters/Haters, Goths, Police Cadets, Sisters, Reality TV Pros, Surfer Dudes Jump Around: Ice Dancers, Best Friends, Father & Son
16	"Little Bull on the Prairie"	Meghan Read	January 28, 2016	September 25, 2015	716	1.18
The nine remaining teams travel to Alberta, Canada, to consume a pot of pork and beans and then ride a mechanical bull. The Cadets delay the Ice Dancers, Stephanie slows Ryan down due to her hatred of beans, and Brody is unable to stay on the mechanical bull. In the end, The Surfer Dudes win the leg, while Dwayne and Junior are last to arrive and are eliminated but Junior and Dwayne finally become great friends. All-In: Tip Your Hat, Spill Your Beans, and Eat Like a Cowboy by All Means Botch or Watch: Mechanical Bull Riding Botch or Watch Performers: Brody, Devin, Crimson, Stephanie, MacArthur, Kitty, Noah, Jacques, and Dwayne
17	"Lord of the Ring Toss"	Terry McGurrin	February 1, 2016	September 28, 2015	717	1.28
The final eight remaining teams now travel to the Arctic Circle, where they must play ring toss on narwhal horns and then build an igloo. The Surfer Dudes overcome the Ice Dancers' mind games and come in first once again, while Ryan and Stephanie come in last once again after using a Boomerang on themselves. It is revealed to be another non-elimination leg, so they stay in the race. Botch or Watch: Narwhal Ring Toss All-In: Igloo Building Botch or Watch Performers: Geoff, Ryan, Carrie, Sanders, Ennui, Owen, Josee, Emma, and Stephanie
18	"Got Venom"	Miles Smith	February 2, 2016	September 29, 2015	718	1.18
The eight remaining teams now travel to Flores, Indonesia, where they must all collect Komodo dragon venom and then find a quilt with the series logo on it. The Goths come in first, while Noah is buried under a pile of rugs and Owen spends too long trying to find him. As a result, Noah and Owen are eliminated. Emma kisses Noah before their departure. All-Ins: How to Milk Your Dragon, Prepare to Meet Your Loom
19	"Dude Buggies"	Craig Martin	February 3, 2016	September 30, 2015	719	1.14
The final seven remaining teams now travel to Las Vegas, Nevada, where they must either ride dune buggies in a bonanza and collect three flags or do a magic show (perform a magic trick) right in front of a magician. The Surfer Dudes struggle to complete the challenge, while the Goths come in first once again, angering the Ice Dancers. After the five stages of heartbreak, Devin suddenly realizes he likes Carrie, but almost at the same time she stops liking him. However, they are saved because of another non-elimination leg. Either-Or: Dune Buggy Bonanza or Magic Show Dune Buggy Bonanza: Surfer Dudes, Police Cadets, Sisters Magic Show: Daters/Haters, Goths Switch: Ice Dancers (Magic Show to Dune Buggy Bonanza), Best Friends (Dune Buggy Bonanza to Magic Show)
20	"El Bunny Supremo"	Shelley Scarrow	February 4, 2016	October 1, 2015	720	1.23
The seven remaining teams drive a bus to Acapulco, Mexico, where they must eat spicy peppers in order to determine which height they will jump from on a cliff to get the next travel tip. They then must ride their burros to the chill zone. Devin is unable to eat the pepper and is blinded when he rubs pepper juice in his eyes. The Cadets win the leg, while the Goths are eliminated after the Ice Dancers kidnapped Loki. All-Ins: Who Loves Pepper and Who Loves Dip?, Burrowed Alive
21	"Ca-Noodling"	Meghan Read	February 8, 2016	October 2, 2015	721	1.16
The final six remaining teams now travel to Cần Thơ, Vietnam, and are being merged into two temporary super-teams to go noodling for Mekong Giant Catfish. The team consisting of the Ice Dancers, the Police Cadets, and the Haters, called the Axis of Evil, win the leg, while the other team gets separated again. In the end, the Surfer Dudes are eliminated after sacrificing their win for Carrie and Devin. Superteam: Catfish Noodling All-In: Get Lost and Found Underground
22	"How Deep Is Your Love"	Terry McGurrin	February 9, 2016	October 5, 2015	722	1.28
The final five pairings of remaining teams now travel to Siberia, Russia, where they must traverse down the Kola Borehole, the deepest hole in the world to collect a ball. The Ice Dancers cheat for the lead, and even with a major penalty, they still win the leg. MacArthur accidentally breaks Sanders' arm and they come in last, but they are saved by the non-elimination after Sanders decides to keep going. All-Ins: Ice Yachting in Swimsuits, Who’s Ready to Go Deep
23	"Darjeel with It"	Miles Smith	February 10, 2016	October 6, 2015	723	0.99
The final five remaining teams now travel to Darjeeling, India to harvest tea crops and then ride a train. The Ice Dancers once again cheat their way to first by derailing the train, only to receive a one-hour penalty for that. All other teams take advantage of the penalty, and Emma and Kitty win the leg. The Ice Dancers finish fourth and are still in the race, while Ryan and Stephanie stop before the Chill Zone to declare that they have now made up for each other and become Daters again, eliminating both of them from the race. All-In: Tea Time
24	"Last Tango in Buenos Aires"	Craig Martin	February 11, 2016	October 7, 2015	724	1.18
The final four remaining teams now travel to Buenos Aires, Argentina, for a tango dancing challenge. The Ice Dancers apply legal sabotage to help them win the leg. Later on, the Best Friends, Carrie and Devin, finally confess their true feelings for each other, but it all does not end so well. After Emu lost control of the sisters' emu while heading to chill zone, Devin is accidentally pushed off a cliff by the emu, resulting in serious injury and the Best Friends forced to withdraw from the race. However, they get to choose one of the previously eliminated teams to come back to the race, so they choose the Surfer Dudes to take their place. All-In: Tango Takedown Botch or Watch: Ride 'Em Gaucho Botch or Watch Performers: Jacques, Kitty, MacArthur, and Devin
25	"Bahamarama" (Part 1)	Alex Ganetakos	February 15, 2016	October 8, 2015	725	1.29
The final four remaining teams now travel to the Bahamas, where they first find a secret map that leads to an underwater treasure. Josee's claustrophobia makes her run out of oxygen really fast, forcing MacArthur to reluctantly rescue her. Meanwhile, the Sisters, Emma and Kitty, are delayed when Kitty gets stuck in a rock. The returning team, the Surfer Dudes, come in first. Once the rest of the teams escape, it's a close race to the finish. In the end, Emma and Kitty end up coming in last, so they are the last team eliminated from the race. The final three teams are being headed for the finale in New York City. All-In: Arrr, Matey! This Way be Treasure Maps Botch or Watch: Dive to Survive Botch or Watch Performers: Kitty, Brody, Josee, and MacArthur
26	"A Million Ways to Lose a Million Dollars" (Part 2)	Terry McGurrin	February 15, 2016	October 9, 2015	726	1.14
The final three teams are now in New York City and are getting ready for the finale. Their first challenge is to go to the Empire State Building and climb up all the way to the top in order to grab a case and then take the case to Central Park. The Surfer Dudes are forced to take the subway after their taxi was sabotaged by the Ice Dancers' taxi, and end up in a huge lead, so they reach Central Park first with the case. The Police Cadets reach the Chill Zone first by a few seconds, while the Ice Dancers are finally eliminated from the race. The final challenge is to take the case to the lake and then try to figure out the combination that is being written on one of several buoys, and then open the case that will reveal a map that leads to the finish line to sprint that leads to a stage is where Don and the other eliminated contestants are waiting in another part of Central Park with the eliminated contestants being sitted on bleachers. The Surfers are delayed due to a misunderstanding, and both teams search at the same time. The Cadets are the first to open up their briefcase, but MacArthur accidentally puts a hole in their boat, forcing her to row as fast as she can to shore, tiring her out.: Notes: This episode has two different endings.; After reminiscing about how great the race was, MacArthur tells Brody to keep in touch. Subsequently, the last scene of the season is edited to depict the Surfers holding the million dollar prize, while the Cadets are standing out with the rest of the teams in the peanut gallery. All-Ins: Who’s Ready to Face the Traffic, Buoys Will be Buoys

== Media ==
A video game has been released that allows players to choose any of the series' 36 main characters and race them in short endless runner games. The game, titled "Donculous Dash", was released on January 4, 2016, in Canada only. The game can be downloaded from the Canadian app store and a demo version is also available on their Cartoon Network website.

== Availability ==
The Ridonculous Race is seldom released on any home media, not even Region 4 DVD nor digital download. The only availability of the spinoff is the entirety of the series released as one video on YouTube. In the United Kingdom, the season is available on BBC iPlayer as of April 4, 2022.

== See also ==
- The Amazing Race, the reality series that The Ridonculous Race primarily parodies.
  - The Amazing Race Canada, the Canadian edition of The Amazing Race.
- In Real Life, a similar reality series that was also produced in Canada.
- Total Drama World Tour, the third season of the original series by the same producers.
