= Total DramaRama =

Animated television series

- Genre: Comedy
- Created by: Jennifer Pertsch; Tom McGillis
- Directed by: Keith Oliver; Chad Hicks; Christos Katopodis; George Elliott
- Voices of: Deven Mack; Emilie-Claire Barlow; Katie Crown; Cory Doran; Scott McCord; Drew Nelson; Sarah Gadon; Christian Potenza; Kristin Fairlie; Lilly Bartlam; Bahia Watson; Darren Frost; Wyatt White; Evany Rosen
- Theme music composer: Voodoo Highway Music
- Opening theme: "Total DramaRama"
- Ending theme: "Total DramaRama"
- Composer: Voodoo Highway Music
- Countries of origin: Canada; United States
- Original language: English
- No. of seasons: 3
- No. of episodes: 152 (list of episodes)

Production
- Executive producers: Terry McGurrin; Alice Prodanou; Andrew Harrison; Jennifer Pertsch; Tom McGillis; George Elliott; Brian Irving
- Producers: Wren Errington; Sonia Santarelli
- Running time: 11 minutes
- Production companies: Fresh TV Inc. Corus Entertainment

Original release
- Network: Teletoon (Canada); Cartoon Network (U.S.)
- Release: September 1, 2018 – April 15, 2023

Related
- Total Drama; The Ridonculous Race; 6teen

Total DramaRama (originally titled Total Drama Daycare) is an animated comedy children's television series created by Tom McGillis and Jennifer Pertsch that premiered on Cartoon Network in the United States on September 1, 2018, and on Teletoon in Canada on October 7, 2018. The show, serving as a crossover prequel spin-off as well as the second spin-off of Total Drama following The Ridonculous Race, is set in an alternate universe of Total Drama and 6teen. The series was co-produced by Fresh TV and Corus Entertainment in association with Cartoon Network, and distributed by Cake Entertainment.

== Premise ==
The series re-introduces some of the original Total Drama characters in an alternate universe where they are aged down from teenagers to toddlers, being taken care of by Chef Hatchet. Each episode features dream sequences, cutaways, visual jokes, confessionals, and flashbacks.

A Ridonculous Race contestant, MacArthur, has made recurring appearances and several other characters from the Total Drama series and The Ridonculous Race have made cameo appearances throughout the series.

== Episodes ==
Season	Episodes	Originally released	
Season	Episodes	First released	Last released
1	51	September 1, 2018	November 30, 2019
2	51	January 11, 2020	March 27, 2021
3	50	April 3, 2021	July 22, 2022
Special		April 15, 2023	

== Characters ==
- Chef Hatchet (voiced by Deven Mack)
- Courtney (voiced by Emilie-Claire Barlow)
- Gwen (voiced by Lilly Bartlam)
- Duncan (voiced by Drew Nelson)
- Owen (voiced by Scott McCord)
- Izzy (voiced by Katie Crown)
- Noah (voiced by Cory Doran)
- Bridgette (voiced by Kristin Fairlie)
- Harold (voiced by Darren Frost)
- Beth (voiced by Sarah Gadon)
- Jude Lizowski (from 6teen) (voiced by Christian Potenza)
- Leshawna (voiced by Bahia Watson)
- Cody (voiced by Wyatt White)
- Lightning (voiced by Kwaku Adu-Poku)
- Sugar (voiced by Rochelle Wilson)
- MacArthur (from The Ridonculous Race) (voiced by Evany Rosen)

== Production ==
The show was under production as of December 19, 2017 under the title Total Drama Daycare. It first aired on Cartoon Network in the United States on September 1, 2018. Jennifer Pertsch revealed in an interview with TV Kids that Fresh took "11 favorites from the original cast and aged them down to 4".

On February 13, 2019, the series was greenlit for a second season. On June 23, 2020, Corus Entertainment announced that the series was renewed for a third season, which premiered in Canada in mid-2021. Revenge of the Island contestant, Lightning, and Pahkitew Island contestant, Sugar, were aged down to join the cast.

== Broadcast ==
=== Streaming ===
The first season is available to stream on HBO Max as of September 20, 2021. The second season is also available to stream on HBO Max. The first 25 episodes of the third season were added to HBO Max on June 6, 2022, while the remaining episodes of season three were added on September 2, 2022.

== Reception ==
=== Critical ===
Total DramaRama has received mostly mixed reviews. Emily Ashby of Common Sense Media gave the series three stars out of five and found that it was as entertaining as previous entries in the Total Drama franchise, declaring that "Total Drama fans who tune in for DramaRama will appreciate the humor in seeing these familiar characters' big personalities in little bodies." The Washington Post found that "the satire that defined the Total Drama shows is less clever" than it had been in previous seasons, and recommended the series for ages 7 and up.

=== Ratings ===
Viewership and ratings per season of Total DramaRama
Season	Episodes	First aired		Last aired		Avg. viewers (millions)
Season	Episodes	Date	Viewers (millions)	Date	Viewers (millions)	Avg. viewers (millions)
1	51	September 1, 2018	0.72	November 30, 2019	0.37	0.61
2	51	January 11, 2020	0.47	March 27, 2021	0.30	0.30
3	49	April 3, 2021	0.18	July 22, 2022	—N/a	0.17
