= Carter Hayden =

Canadian actor

- Born: February 12, 1982 (age 44); British Columbia, Canada
- Occupation: Actor
- Years active: 2001–present

Carter Hayden (born February 12, 1982) is a Canadian voice, film and television actor, well-known for his role as Noah in the animated franchise Total Drama.

== Early life ==
Hayden was born in British Columbia on February 12, 1982.

== Career ==
He voiced Noah in the first season, Total Drama Island, the second season, Total Drama Action, and the third season, Total Drama World Tour and later reprised the role in both Skatoony, as well as the official spin-off series Total Drama Presents: The Ridonculous Race.

Noah has since become one of the most popular Total Drama characters, and for his performance in the third season (for which he had to sing on several occasions), Hayden was nominated for "Best Voice Actor in a TV Series" in the 2011 ToonZone Awards.

From 2011 to 2015, he was the official announcer for the original Disney XD in Canada. He was replaced with Cory Doran since October 9th, 2015, when the channel rebranded to Family CHRGD.

== Filmography ==
=== Film ===
Year	Title	Role	Notes
2001	Treed Murray	KC	
2008	Dawgs Playing Poker	Eager Police Officer	
2013	Pop the Grapes	Toni	Short Film
2015	Jack in the Box	Jack	Short Film

=== Television ===
Year	Title	Role	Notes
2001	In a Heartbeat	Faustus	Episode: "Be True to Your School"
2003	The Blobheads	Roy	Episode: "The Good, the Blob and the Ugly"
2006	The Buck Calder Experience	Clapper Loader	TV Movie
2006	Monster Warriors	Phil the Pilot	Episode: "Pterodactyls"
2007	Erky Perky	Boof (voice)	2 episodes
2007–2011	Total Drama	Noah (voice)	30 episodes
2008–2009	Dex Hamilton: Alien Entomologist	Tung (voice)	26 episodes
2010	Dex Hamilton: Fire and Ice	Tung (voice)	TV Movie
2010	Skatoony	Noah (voice)	Episode: "Invasion"
2010–2013	Sidekick	Kid Ruthless (voice)	11 episodes
2011	Warehouse 13	Wally (Frat Guy)	Episode: "Insatiable"
2012	King	Trevor	Episode: "Alicia Pratta"
2013–2017	Camp Lakebottom	Jordan Buttsquat (voice)	10 episodes
2014	Orphan Black	Paul	3 episodes
2015	Total Drama Presents: The Ridonculous Race	Ennui / Noah / Spud (voices)	21 episodes
2017	The Beaverton	Chad Bankes	Episode: "Episode #1.8"
2017–2019	Hotel Transylvania: The Series	Klaus / Additional Voices	10 episodes
2018	Max Voltage	Larry	

=== Video games ===
Year	Title	Role	Notes
2016	Watch Dogs 2	Lewis (voice)	
