= Total Drama =

Canadian animated comedy

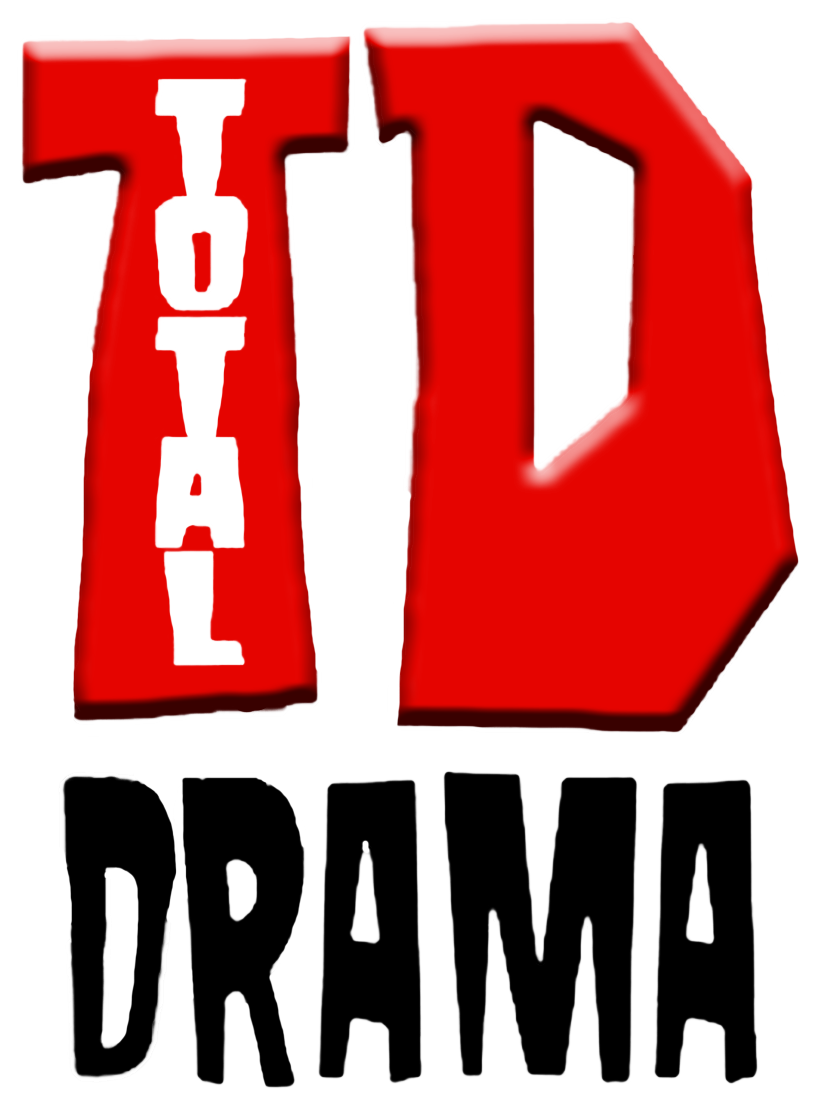
- Genre: Comedy drama Mockumentary; Parody; Slice of life Satire; Slapstick
- Created by: Jennifer Pertsch; Tom McGillis
- Directed by: Todd Kauffman (seasons 1–2); Mark Thornton (seasons 1–2); Keith Oliver (seasons 1–2 (animation), seasons 3–6); Chad Hicks (seasons 3–5)
- Voices of: Christian Potenza; Clé Bennett; Terry McGurrin; Deven Mack
- Theme music composer: Voodoo Highway Music & Post Inc.
- Opening theme: "I Wanna Be Famous!"
- Ending theme: "I Wanna Be Famous!" (Alt. Arrangement)
- Composers: Brian Pickett; James Chapple; Dave Kelly; Greame Cornies
- Country of origin: Canada
- Original language: English
- No. of seasons: 6
- No. of episodes: 145 (list of episodes)

Production
- Executive producers: Tom McGillis; Jennifer Pertsch; George Elliott; Brian Irving; Alex Ganetakos (seasons 4–5); Terry McGurrin (season 6)
- Running time: 22 minutes 44 minutes (specials)
- Production companies: Fresh TV; Cake Entertainment; Corus Entertainment (season 6)

Original release
- Network: Teletoon
- Release: July 8, 2007 – November 20, 2014
- Network: Cartoon Network
- Release: October 21, 2023 – April 14, 2024

Related
- Total Drama Presents: The Ridonculous Race (2015); Total DramaRama (2018–2023)

Total Drama (often shortened as TD) is a Canadian animated television comedy series created by Jennifer Pertsch and Tom McGillis that premiered on Teletoon (now the Canadian version of Cartoon Network) in Canada on July 8, 2007, and on Cartoon Network in the U.S. on June 5, 2008. Also, in March 21, 2009, the United Kingdom premiered Total Drama on Jetix. The series is both a homage and satire of common conventions from reality television competition shows like Survivor.

Each season revolves around a group of teens competing in an elimination-style competition, in that the contestants compete in challenges both as teams and individually for rewards and immunity from elimination. The teams merge roughly halfway through the competition into individuals. As the contestants develop relationships with each other, they are progressively eliminated from the game. When there are only two or three contestants remaining, they compete in a final challenge where the winner is awarded a cash prize: C$100,000 (US$73,129.00) in the first season, or C$1,000,000 (US$731,485.00) from the second season onward. The series currently consists of six seasons: Island (2007), Action, World Tour, Revenge of the Island, the two-part All-Stars and Pahkitew Island, and the two-part Island (2023–2024).

Total Drama has developed a cult following and spawned a franchise. A spin-off series, Total Drama Presents: The Ridonculous Race, premiered on September 7, 2015. A second spin-off series, Total DramaRama, premiered on September 1, 2018, in the U.S., and on October 7, 2018, in Canada. While Netflix started streaming selected seasons of Total Drama in 2014, the entire series streamed on Netflix in the United States from 2018 until being removed on February 1, 2021.

It was announced on February 17, 2021 that a revival of Total Drama had been greenlit, with two new seasons being produced for Cartoon Network and HBO Max in the United States, Cartoon Network in Canada, and CBBC in the United Kingdom. The first part came out in Italy on April 8, 2023, with the original English version being available on Discovery+ in the region, and will later see an international extension. Despite being announced as two seasons, the revival was later revealed in the end credits to be one season, similar to the fifth season.

== Production ==
Tom McGillis says they used a "countrywide online research project" to determine this demographic's likes. Fresh TV partners McGillis, Jennifer Pertsch, George Elliott and Brian Irving produced the series. The budget for the first season was US$8,000,000. It was animated in Flash, at Elliott Animation's studio in Toronto.

Every cast and crew member on Total Drama had to sign a confidentiality agreement not to disclose who the winner was. All the characters were designed by Todd Kauffman, who previously designed characters for shows such as Bob and Margaret and Yin Yang Yo!. An early name for the series was Camp TV when the series first started production in 2006.

The fifth season was divided into two different segments. The first segment, Total Drama All-Stars, takes place on the original island from the first season, Camp Wawanakwa, while the second segment, Total Drama: Pahkitew Island, features a new setting and cast.

McGillis had stated in 2013 that his personal goal was for Total Drama to go up to ten seasons. Alex Ganetakos, the executive story editor and the senior writer for the series, also mentioned in 2014 that the production team planned to make more seasons in the future.

In a Q&A on September 25, 2018, when asked if there would be additional seasons, McGillis responded with "Nope. Sorry to be a dreamkiller, but there's no market for this experience in the wider entertainment marketplace right now".

On February 17, 2021, it was announced that two new seasons were being produced for Cartoon Network and HBO Max. On June 22, 2022, it was announced by Cake Entertainment that the BBC had joined Warner Bros. Discovery as a co-commissioner for the new seasons and would air them on the CBBC Channel in the United Kingdom. In addition, the previous five seasons of the show and its spin-offs would be added to BBC iPlayer.

On October 6, 2022, Regular Capital posted a tweet revealing a new poster for Total Drama that showed the new cast and Chef in a new design.

On October 27, 2022, it was confirmed in an interview with Terry McGurrin on YouTube that Deven Mack would replace Clé Bennett as the voice of Chef Hatchet due to Bennett moving to Hollywood, and reprising his role from the spin-off series Total DramaRama. He later clarified on Twitter that despite essentially filling the role of a season six or seven, the new seasons are instead being produced as a new series.

On March 28, 2023, it was confirmed that Terry McGurrin would be replacing Christian Potenza as Chris McLean because of "creative decisions".

== Episodes ==
A list of all the seasons that have aired with the original Canadian air dates shown below along with basic elements for each season. The 100th episode aired on February 27, 2014.

Series	Season	Title	Episodes		Originally released (Canada)	
Series	Season	Title	Episodes		First released	Last released
Total Drama	1	Island (2007)	27		July 8, 2007	November 29, 2008
Total Drama	2	Action	27		January 11, 2009	June 10, 2010
Total Drama	3	World Tour	26		June 10, 2010	April 24, 2011
Total Drama	4	Revenge of the Island	13		January 5, 2012	April 12, 2012
Total Drama	5	All-Stars	26	13	September 10, 2013	December 13, 2013
Total Drama	5	Pahkitew Island	26	13	July 7, 2014	July 18, 2014
Total Drama	6	Island (2023)	26	13	October 21, 2023	December 2, 2023
Total Drama	6	Island (2024)	26	13	March 3, 2024	April 14, 2024
Total Drama Presents:	1	The Ridonculous Race	26		September 7, 2015	October 9, 2015

== Broadcast ==
Total Drama first premiered on July 8, 2007, on Teletoon in Canada, while the series aired almost a year later on Cartoon Network in the United States on June 5, 2008. Since then, Total Drama has become an international franchise and one of the biggest successes for Fresh TV. As of September 2011, the entire series has been shown in over 100 countries around the world, with the first season airing in 188 countries worldwide. The fourth season first aired on Canal+ Family (later on Télétoon+) in France, while the fifth season first aired on K2 in Italy. Australia was the first country to air the third season. Total Drama Island also aired on Pop Max (formerly known as Kix) and Disney XD in the United Kingdom, with Action on Disney XD only and subsequent series unaired in the territory until Total DramaRama was picked up by Pop. Subsequently, a deal with the BBC led to The Ridonculous Race being added to BBC iPlayer and the 2023 Island reboot airing on CBBC. The BBC also gained non-exclusive rights to Total Dramarama, running it concurrently with Pop. In autumn 2024 some of the later seasons of the original run—Revenge of the Island, All-Stars and Pahkitew Island—became available on iPlayer.

== Characters ==
Total Drama has had a total of 68 characters in the series who were introduced as contestants through seven seasons. The first three seasons consist of an original cast, with a total of 25 characters. 22 were introduced in the first season, while the other 3 were introduced in the second season's special before becoming main characters in the third season. The fourth season consists of a new cast with 13 characters. The first part of the fifth season brings back 14 contestants from the previous two casts each to compete together for the million. A third cast with 14 characters were introduced in the second part of the fifth season. For The Ridonculous Race, 32 new characters were introduced. A fourth cast with 16 new characters were introduced in the revival of Total Drama Island.

Characters of the Total Drama series

Introduced in
Total Drama Island

First generation: 22 contestants total
(3 not shown, introduced in World Tour)

Introduced in
Total Drama: Revenge of the Island

Second generation: 13 contestants total

Introduced in
Total Drama: Pahkitew Island

Third generation: 14 contestants total

By season, 22 characters competed in the first season, 15 competed in the second season, 18 competed in the third season, 13 competed in the fourth season, 14 characters competed in both parts of the fifth season (28 characters in total for the fifth season), 36 competed in the spin-off series The Ridonculous Race, and 16 new characters competed in both parts of the revival season.

=== Cast ===
List indicators

This section includes characters who will appear or have appeared in more than two films in the series.

- An empty grey cell indicates the character was not in the film, or that the character's official presence has not yet been confirmed.
- ^{E} indicates an appearance not included in the theatrical cut.
- ^{G} indicates a guest appearance in the season.
- ^{M} indicates an appearance in onscreen movie footage.
- ^{P} indicates an appearance in onscreen photographs.
- ^{Y} indicates a younger version of the character.

Character	Main series								Spin-off series			
Character	Total Drama Island	Total Drama Action	Total Drama World Tour	Total Drama: Revenge of the Island	Total Drama All-Stars	Pahkitew Island	Total Drama Island	Total Drama Island	Total Drama Presents: The Ridonculous Race	Total DramaRama		
Character	2007-08	2009-10	2010-11	2012	2013	2014	2023	2024	2015	Season 1 2018-19	Season 2 2020-21	Season 3 2021-22
Chris McLean	Christian Potenza	Christian Potenza	Christian Potenza	Christian Potenza	Christian Potenza	Christian Potenza	Terry McGurrin	Terry McGurrin	Silent cameo			Christian Potenza
Chef Hatchet	Clé Bennett	Clé Bennett	Clé Bennett	Clé Bennett	Clé Bennett	Clé Bennett	Deven Mack	Deven Mack		Deven Mack	Deven Mack	Deven Mack
Owen	Scott McCord	Scott McCord	Scott McCord	Scott McCord	Scott McCord^{G}			Scott McCord	Scott McCord	Scott McCord^{Y}	Scott McCord^{Y}	Scott McCord^{Y}
Gwen	Megan Fahlenbock	Megan Fahlenbock	Megan Fahlenbock	Megan Fahlenbock	Megan Fahlenbock					Lily Bartlam^{Y}	Lily Bartlam^{Y}	Lily Bartlam^{Y}
Heather	Rachel Wilson	Rachel Wilson	Rachel Wilson	Rachel Wilson	Rachel Wilson							Silent cameo
Duncan	Drew Nelson	Drew Nelson	Drew Nelson	Drew Nelson	Drew Nelson			Silent cameo^{P}		Drew Nelson^{Y}	Drew Nelson^{Y}	Drew Nelson^{Y}
Leshawna	Novie Edwards	Novie Edwards	Novie Edwards	Silent cameo						Bahia Watson^{Y}	Bahia Watson^{Y}	Bahia Watson^{Y}
Geoff	Dan Petronijevic	Dan Petronijevic	Dan Petronijevic	Silent cameo					Dan Petronijevic	Silent cameo^{Y}		Silent cameo^{Y}
Izzy	Katie Crown	Katie Crown	Katie Crown	Katie Crown	Katie Crown^{G}			Silent cameo^{P}		Katie Crown^{Y}	Katie Crown^{Y}	Katie Crown^{Y}
DJ	Clé Bennett	Clé Bennett	Clé Bennett	Clé Bennett						Silent cameo^{Y}		Silent cameo^{Y}
Lindsay	Stephanie Anne Mills	Stephanie Anne Mills	Stephanie Anne Mills	Stephanie Anne Mills	Stephanie Anne Mills							
Bridgette	Kristin Fairlie	Kristin Fairlie	Kristin Fairlie	Kristin Fairlie						Kristin Fairlie^{Y}	Kristin Fairlie^{Y}	Kristin Fairlie^{Y}
Trent	Scott McCord	Scott McCord	Scott McCord	Silent cameo						Silent cameo^{Y}		Silent cameo^{Y}
Eva	Julia Chantrey	Julia Chantrey	Julia Chantrey	Silent cameo								
Harold	Brian Froud	Brian Froud	Brian Froud	Silent cameo						Darren Frost^{Y}	Darren Frost^{Y}	Darren Frost^{Y}
Courtney	Emilie-Claire Barlow	Emilie-Claire Barlow	Emilie-Claire Barlow	Silent cameo	Emilie Claire-Barlow			Silent cameo^{P}		Emilie Claire-Barlow^{Y}	Emilie Claire-Barlow^{Y}	Emilie Claire-Barlow^{Y}
Sadie	Lauren Lipson	Lauren Lipson	Lauren Lipson	Silent cameo								Silent cameo^{Y}
Beth	Sarah Gadon	Sarah Gadon	Sarah Gadon	Silent cameo						Sarah Gadon^{Y}	Sarah Gadon^{Y}	Sarah Gadon^{Y}
Cody	Peter Oldring	Peter Oldring	Peter Oldring	Silent cameo	Silent cameo					Wyatt White^{Y}	Wyatt White^{Y}	Wyatt White^{Y}
Tyler	Peter Oldring	Peter Oldring	Peter Oldring	Silent cameo								
Katie	Stephanie Anne Mills	Stephanie Anne Mills	Stephanie Anne Mills	Silent cameo						Silent cameo^{Y}		Silent cameo^{Y}
Justin	Adam Reid	Adam Reid	Adam Reid	Silent cameo								
Noah	Carter Hayden	Carter Hayden	Carter Hayden	Silent cameo					Carter Hayden	Cory Doran^{Y}	Cory Doran^{Y}	Cory Doran^{Y}
Ezekiel	Peter Oldring	Peter Oldring	Peter Oldring	Animal sounds only	Animal sounds only				Silent cameo^{P}			
Alejandro		Marco Grazzini	Marco Grazzini	Silent cameo	Alex House							Silent cameo
Sierra		Annick Obonsawin	Annick Obonsawin	Silent cameo	Annick Obonsawin							
Blaineley		Carla Collins	Carla Collins		Silent cameo				Silent cameo			
Cameron				Kevin Duhaney	Kevin Duhaney							
Lightning				Tyrone Savage	Tyrone Savage							Kwaku Adu-Poku^{Y}
Zoey				Barbara Mamabolo	Barbara Mamabolo							
Scott				James Wallis	James Wallis							
Jo				Laurie Elliott	Laurie Elliott							
Scott				Cory Doran	Cory Doran							
Dakota				Carleigh Beverly	Silent cameo^{P}							
Anne Maria				Athena Karkanis					Silent cameo			
Brick				Jon Cor								
Sam				Brian Froud	Brian Froud							
Dawn				Caitlynne Medrek								
B				Silent role								
Staci				Ashley Peters								
Shawn						Zachary Bennett						
Sky						Sarah Podemski						
Sugar						Rochelle Wilson						Rochelle Wilson^{Y}
Jasmine						Katie Bergin			Silent cameo^{M}			Silent cameo
Max						Bruce Dow			Silent cameo^{M}		Tristan Mammitzsch^{Y}	Silent cameo^{Y}
Scarlett						Kristi Friday			Silent cameo^{M}			
Dave						Daniel DeSanto						
Topher						Christopher Jacot			Silent cameo^{M}			
Ella						Sunday Muse					Sunday Muse^{Y}	Silent cameo^{Y}
Samey						Bryn McAuley			Silent cameo^{M}			
Rodney						Ian Ronningen			Silent cameo^{M}			
Amy						Bryn McAuley						
Leonard						Clé Bennett			Clé Bennett			
Beardo						Clé Bennett						
Priya							Eman Ayaz	Eman Ayaz				
Bowie							Brandon Michael Arrington	Brandon Michael Arrington				
Millie							Barbara Mamabolo	Barbara Mamabolo				
Julia							Julie Sype	Julie Sype				
Emma							Melanie Leishman	Melanie Leishman				
Chase							Julius Cho	Julius Cho				
Zee							Gerardo Gismondi	Gerardo Gismondi				
Ripper							Fred Kennedy	Fred Kennedy				
Wayne							Jack Copland	Jack Copland				
Raj							Varun Saranga	Varun Saranga				
MK							Kimberly Ann Truong	Kimberly Ann Truong				
Damien							Daniel Keith Morrison	Daniel Keith Morrison				
Scary Girl							Katie Griffin	Katie Griffin				
Nichelle							Tymika Tafari	Tymika Tafari				
Axel							Tamara Almeida	Tamara Almeida				
Caleb							Kwaku Adu-Poku	Kwaku Adu-Poku				
Don									Terry McGurrin	Terry McGurrin^{G}	Silent cameo	
MacArthur								Evany Rosen	Evany Rosen	Evany Rosen	Evany Rosen	Evany Rosen
Sanders									Nicole Stamp			
Brody									Scott McCord			
Josee									Julie Lemieux			
Jacques									Scott McCord			
Kitty									Stephanie Anne Mills			
Emma									Stacey DePass			
Devin									Jeff Geddis	Silent cameo^{P}		
Carrie									Kristin Fairlie	Silent cameo^{P}		
Stephanie									Nicki Burke			
Ryan									Joseph Motiki			
Ennui									Carter Hayden			
Crimson									Stacy DePass			
Dwayne									Neil Crone			
Junior									Jacob Ewaniuk			
Rock							Silent cameo^{M}		Carlos Díaz			
Spud							Silent cameo^{M}		Carter Hayden			
Lorenzo									Carlos Díaz			
Chet									Darren Frost	Silent cameo^{P}		
Jay									Lyon Smith			
Mickey									Lyon Smith			
Kelly									Julie Lemieux			
Taylor									Bryn McAuley			
Tom									Jeff Geddis			Silent cameo
Jen									Ashley Botting			Sarah Gadon^{G}
Laurie									Emilie-Claire Barlow		Silent cameo^{P}	
Miles									Katie Griffin			
Ellody									Emilie-Claire Barlow			
Mary									Katie Griffin			
Pete								David Huband^{G}	Adrian Truss			
Gerry								Silent cameo	David Huband			
Tammy									Nicki Burke			
Jude										Christian Potenza^{Y}	Christian Potenza^{Y}	Christian Potenza^{Y}

=== Roles outside series ===
Total Drama characters are occasional special guests in Skatoony where the characters are interviewed to play in quiz trivia games against real people and other Canadian series characters. Geoff, Leonard, Noah, and Owen also appear in Total Drama Presents: The Ridonculous Race as contestants. Beth, Bridgette, Cody, Courtney, DJ, Duncan, Ella, Geoff, Gwen, Harold, Izzy, Katie, Leshawna, Lightning, Max, Noah, Owen, Sadie, Sugar, and Trent appear in the alternate-universe spin-off Total DramaRama as young children, along with Alejandro, Carrie, Chef Hatchet, Chet, Chris McLean, Don, Heather, Jasmine, Jen, Laurie, MacArthur, and Tom appearing as teenagers and adults.

== Reception ==
=== Broadcast ===
The series has received high ratings, ranking #1 in the under-14 age group throughout its run. As of 2011, the first season has been shown in over 188 countries, while the rest of the series was shown in at least 100 countries.

=== Critical reception ===
The first season, Island, received generally positive reviews. Common Sense Media gave the show 4 out of 5 stars, calling it a "clever cartoon reality show spoof".

The second season, Action, received generally positive reviews from critics, who despite criticizing the overt similarity to the previous season, praised the development of characters who had less time in Island.

The third season, World Tour, received critical acclaim for the antagonist of the season, Alejandro, the musical numbers and humor, with minor criticism directed at Ezekiel's development and the Gwen-Courtney-Duncan love triangle.

The fourth season, Revenge of the Island, was criticized for a shorter length and a weaker cast than previous seasons and received mixed to positive reviews.

The first part of the fifth season, All-Stars, was heavily criticized for its character derailment, challenges, main antagonist, and lack of payoff. The second part, Pahkitew Island, was criticized for its more stereotyped cast but was received more positively than All-Stars.

== Legacy ==
Total Drama has garnered a cult following. Co-creator Tom McGillis commented on the series' popularity, saying that, "For tweens around the world, Total Drama is more than just a parody of a reality show. It's THEIR reality show". Total Drama was cited by Cary and Michael Huang as an influence for Battle for Dream Island, which has inspired a genre of animation known as "object shows".

=== Awards and nominations ===
Year	Award Event	Category	Nominee/work(s)	Result
2008	23rd Gemini Awards	Best Animated Program or Series	Total Drama Island	Nominated
2008	International Interactive Emmy®	Interactive Program	Total Drama Island: Totally Interactive!	Nominated
2010	Kidscreen Awards	Tweens/Teen; Best Animated Series	Total Drama Island	Won
2010	Kidscreen Awards	Viewer's Choice; Tweens/Teens Program	Total Drama Island	Won
2010	25th Gemini Awards	Best Children's or Youth Fiction Program or Series	Total Drama Action	Nominated
2010	ToonZone Awards	Best Foreign Series	Total Drama World Tour	Won
2010	ToonZone Awards	Best Music Score on a TV Series	Total Drama World Tour	Won
2010	ToonZone Awards	Best Song in a TV Series	Oh My Izzy (Total Drama World Tour)	Nominated
2010	ToonZone Awards	Best Voice Actor in a TV Series	Carter Hayden (Noah)	Nominated
2010	ToonZone Awards	Best Voice Actress in a TV Series	Annick Obonsawin (Sierra)	Won
2011	Kidscreen Awards	Tweens/Teens (Best Animated Series)	Total Drama World Tour	Won
2011	Kidscreen Awards	Creative Talent (Best Voice Talent)	Total Drama World Tour	Won
2011	Kidscreen Awards	Viewer's Choice (Best Tweens/Teens Program)	Total Drama World Tour	Won
2012	Pixie Awards	Animation	Total Drama World Tour	Won
2012	Kidscreen Awards	Programming—Tweens/Teens (Best Companion Website 2012)	Total Drama World Tour Online	Won
2015	Cynopsis Kids !magination Awards	Kids 2-11 Series/Special	Total Drama: Pahkitew Island	Won
2015	Youth Media Alliance Awards of Excellence	Ages 9–14 (Best Television Program, Animation)	Total Drama: Pahkitew Island	Won
2015	3rd Canadian Screen Awards	Best Children's or Youth Fiction Program or Series	Total Drama All-Stars	Nominated
2015	3rd Canadian Screen Awards	Best Performance in a Children's or Youth Fiction Program or Series	Christian Potenza (for "Heroes Vs. Villains")	Nominated
2015	ACTRA Toronto Awards	Best Voice Performance	Cory Doran	Won
2017	5th Canadian Screen Awards	Best Writing and Animated Program or Series	Total Drama Presents: The Ridonculous Race (Alex Ganetakos)	Nominated
2017	5th Canadian Screen Awards	Cross-Platform Project, Children's	Total Drama Presents: 'Donculous Dash	Nominated
2019	Youth Media Alliance	Best Animation Program, Ages 6–9	"That's a Wrap" (Total DramaRama)	Won
2020	8th Canadian Screen Awards	Best Animation Program or Series	Total DramaRama	Nominated

== Media ==
=== DVD releases ===
Season	DVD release dates		
Season	Region 1	Region 4	
1	August 18, 2009	May 5, 2010	September 29, 2010
2	—N/a	November 2, 2011	July 4, 2012
3	—N/a	April 3, 2013	August 7, 2013
4	—N/a	October 8, 2014	
5	—N/a	March 4, 2015	July 7, 2015

Up until November 2, 2011, only Total Drama Island had been released on DVD. Cartoon Network released their Total Drama Island DVD in the U.S. on August 18, 2009 (Region 1), while Madman Entertainment (Region 4) also released Total Drama Island on DVD in Australia, but this time in two parts (Collection 1 on May 5, 2010, and Collection 2 on September 29, 2010). However, almost two years after Total Drama Action was first aired, Madman released their Collection 1 DVD of the second season on November 2, 2011 (with Collection 2 being released on July 4, 2012), making Australia the only country that has released the entirety of Total Drama Action for private home viewing. Australia also released Total Drama World Tour on DVD with Collection 1 being released on April 3, 2013, and Collection 2 being released on August 7, 2013. On October 8, 2014, Total Drama: Revenge of the Island was released into one part due to it being a shorter season. The first part of the fifth season, Total Drama All-Stars, was released on March 4, 2015, with the second part, Total Drama: Pahkitew Island, being released on July 7, 2015.

=== Online promotion ===
Teletoon hosted a Total Drama-based website called "Total Drama Online" from 2009 to 2013 where players could play games and earn badges to win prizes. Even though most features (like user accounts, original avatar designer and badge counter) from this website were only exclusive to Canadian viewers, all of the games and basic elements were available to the rest of the world. Cartoon Network also had their own Total Drama website from 2009 to 2015, which was very similar to the Canadian website, but was only exclusive to American viewers. Various alternate websites based on the series also exist throughout most of the other countries the show airs in, which are all in their respective languages.

=== Spin-off series ===
==== The Ridonculous Race ====
A spin-off series titled Total Drama Presents: The Ridonculous Race takes place in the same universe as the original show. The series is modeled on the format of The Amazing Race where the contestants are grouped into tag teams who race around the world throughout the series. There is a new host named Don, who replaced the original host Chris. Even though a few of the characters from the main series make appearances, the spin-off series is primarily dominated by a new cast. The spin-off series includes 18 pairs of teams (36 characters). It first premiered on September 7, 2015, on Cartoon Network and later premiered on January 4, 2016, on the Canadian version of Cartoon Network.

==== Total DramaRama ====
A second spin-off series was announced on December 19, 2017, as Total Drama Daycare. The series was later renamed Total DramaRama so that viewers would not mistake it for a daycare season of Total Drama. It first premiered on September 1, 2018, on Cartoon Network in the U.S. and on October 7, 2018, on Teletoon in Canada. The series has a runtime length of eleven minutes, and is a slice of life comedy. It features some of the original characters from Total Drama Island as toddlers such as Beth, Bridgette, Cody, Courtney, Duncan, Gwen, Harold, Izzy, Leshawna, Noah, and Owen, as well as Jude from 6teen. Chef Hatchet also returns as a younger adult. The series began production in early 2017.

On February 13, 2019, the series was greenlit for a second season.

On June 23, 2020, Corus Entertainment announced that the series was renewed for a third season, which was set to premiere in mid-2021. Revenge of the Island contestant, Lightning, and Pahkitew Island contestant, Sugar, were aged down to join the cast.
