= Shelley Scarrow =

Canadian television producer and writer

- Born: Sarnia, Ontario, Canada
- Occupations: Television producer and writer
- Writing career
- Notable work: Degrassi: The Next Generation
- Notable awards: Writers Guild of Canada award

Shelley Scarrow is a Canadian television producer and writer from Sarnia, Ontario. She won a Writers Guild of Canada award for her work on the Degrassi: The Next Generation season three episode "Pride" (which she shared with her husband James Hurst and Aaron Martin). Scarrow has also been nominated for a Gemini Award. She is a writer on the TV shows Being Erica, Total Drama, and Wynonna Earp.
