= List of Total DramaRama episodes =

Episode list for an animated show

Total DramaRama is an animated comedy children's television series created by Tom McGillis and Jennifer Pertsch that premiered on Cartoon Network in the United States on September 1, 2018, and on Teletoon in Canada on October 7, 2018.

== Series overview ==
Season	Episodes	Originally released	
Season	Episodes	First released	Last released
1	51	September 1, 2018	November 30, 2019
2	51	January 11, 2020	March 27, 2021
3	50	April 3, 2021	July 22, 2022
Special		April 15, 2023	

== Episodes ==
=== Season 1 (2018–19) ===
No. overall	No. in season	Title	Written by	Canadian air date	U.S. air date	Prod. code	U.S. viewers (millions)
1	1	"Venthalla"	Terry McGurrin	October 7, 2018	September 1, 2018 (Note: "Venthalla" was released on the Cartoon Network website on July 30, 2018.)	V101	0.72
Owen wins an uberball from the crane machine, but the ball was confiscated by Mr. Hatchet, known as Chef. Duncan leads the kids through the vents to retrieve that toy, but the escape plan was thought up by him. Meanwhile, Noah stays behind to distract Mr. Hatchet from noticing the kids are absent, despite not actually being absent.
2	2	"Duck Duck Juice"	Terry McGurrin	October 28, 2018	September 1, 2018 (Note: "Duck Duck Juice" was released on the Cartoon Network website on August 13, 2018.)	V102	0.77
Izzy and Jude dare each other to have Chef's favorite drink, the rainbow pegasus juice mix. After drinking, they both get hyped up on sugar and the kids have to look after them. Meanwhile, Duncan and Courtney go to the store to buy Chef a new juice mix to prevent him from going crazy.
3	3	"Cluckwork Orange"	Laurie Elliott	October 28, 2018	September 1, 2018	V103	0.80
Jude meets a chicken from a petting zoo and befriends it. He doesn't know that the chicken is an evil psychopath and the kids have to warn him about it. Meanwhile, Cody slowly becomes a werewolf after sucking his thumb after petting a wolverine.
4	4	"Free Chili"	Miles Smith	October 21, 2018	September 1, 2018	V104	0.75
When Owen accidentally puts his walkie talkie inside a chili dog, the kids think it is an alien chili dog, especially Harold, who thinks that there are real aliens trying to take over the world.
5	5	"The Date"	Jennifer Pertsch	October 7, 2018	September 8, 2018	V105	0.72
Chef is in a devastated mood after a breakup with his girlfriend and will not serve the kids pizza until he is happy again. The kids create a secret admirer, which brings Chef into a happy mood, and he starts serving pizza them again. Unfortunately, the plan is unintentionally ruined by Izzy, who sets up a date with the secret admirer, causing Owen and Jude to go disguised as the admirer.
6	6	"Aquarium for a Dream"	Andrew Harrison	October 14, 2018	September 8, 2018	V106	0.74
Chef buys the kids a new goldfish that they are allowed to take care of. However, the goldfish gets killed and, not wanting to hurt the kid's feelings, Chef replaces it with a new fish. After this happens a few times, Gwen realizes something is up, and she tries to convince Chef to tell the other kids the truth.
7	7	"Cuttin' Corners"	Jocelyn Geddie	October 21, 2018	September 15, 2018	V107	0.78
Izzy brings a cake to the daycare. Wanting a piece on the corners of the cake, Beth, Leshawna, and Duncan try to become her best friends to get a corner piece, but as a result, they have to participate in Izzy's extreme stunts and games.
8	8	"Sharing is Caring"	Terry McGurrin	November 4, 2018	September 15, 2018	V108	0.79
When Courtney brings a collector's toy to show and tell that is worth a fortune, the kids want her to share it with them, but Courtney refuses. This results in a battle for the toy.
9	9	"Ant We All Just Get Along?"	Ryan Belleville	November 4, 2018	September 22, 2018	V109	0.81
The kids find an anthill and each want to do something different with it. Beth and Owen want to protect the ants while Courtney and LeShawna want to dispose of them. Meanwhile, Chef plays a game in the classroom.
10	10	"Germ Factory"	Jennifer Pertsch	October 14, 2018	September 29, 2018	V110	0.75
LeShawna is sick and is absent from the daycare. Duncan realizes that getting sick is the best plan to escape, and he organizes a plot to get sick and escape the daycare.
11	11	"Cone in 60 Seconds"	Craig Brown	November 11, 2018	October 6, 2018	V111	0.72
Owen is excited to get ice cream, but he loses his money and needs to get more. After getting money from the kids, he can finally get his ice cream, but the ice cream lady, MacArthur, goes to the park. The kids chase after the truck to get the ice cream.
12	12	"The Bad Guy Busters"	Craig Brown	November 11, 2018	October 13, 2018	V112	0.81
After watching a superhero movie, Owen, Jude, Beth, and Izzy decide to make their own superhero team. However, they can't find a villain to fight, so Izzy decides to create her own villain and the superheroes face off against her.
13	13	"That's a Wrap"	Miles Smith	November 18, 2018	October 20, 2018	V113	0.63
At a field trip at the museum, Duncan wants to scare Courtney. He enlists the help of Cody to make the scare happen.
14	14	"Tiger Fail"	Evany Rosen	November 18, 2018	October 27, 2018	V114	0.73
The kids are playing loudly inside and Chef cannot get any work done, so he promises to buy the kids ice cream if they are quiet. All the kids want chocolate ice cream. That is, everyone except for Gwen, who wants tiger tail ice cream. Chef suggests the kids play the quiet game to determine the flavor. The kids try to get Gwen to talk so they can get chocolate ice cream.
15	15	"A Ninjustice to Harold"	Laurie Elliott	November 25, 2018	November 3, 2018	V115	0.65
Harold enjoys being the ninja of the class, but he soon becomes jealous when the kids call Beth a ninja. Harold then sets up a ninja battle between the two.
16	16	"Having the Timeout of Our Lives"	Miles Smith	November 25, 2018	November 10, 2018	V116	0.79
When Owen gets his first timeout, Duncan shows him a secret arcade below the carpet. Owen and Duncan have a lot of fun there, but Owen needs to get another timeout to be there again. With Duncan's help, Owen gets a lot of timeouts, but on the downside, he loses most of his friends. In the end, Duncan allows Owen to tell them about the arcade.
17	17	"Hic Hic Hooray"	Andrew Harrison	November 24, 2018	November 17, 2018	V117	0.69
After Bridgette drinks a can of soda, she gets the hiccups, and she tries to stop them so she won't get sent to "Hiccup Island", which is just a tall tale made up by Noah.
18	18	"Bananas & Cheese"	Shawn Kalb	November 24, 2018	November 24, 2018	V118	0.54
Famous musicians "Bananas & Cheese" are coming to visit the daycare, but Duncan does everything he can to stop them, since their music is terrible and, unbekonwnst to the rest of the class,"Bananas & Cheese" are really his parents.
19	19	"Inglorious Toddlers"	Miles Smith	December 9, 2018	December 1, 2018	V119	0.60
After getting a high score on a video game, Noah is recruited to a toddler military school, leaving Owen sad and alone. Will Owen be able to convince Noah to come back?
20	20	"Not Without My Fudgy Lumps"	Alice Prodanou	December 9, 2018	December 8, 2018	V120	0.73
Owen's fudgy lumps are accidentally left outside, and he must get them back before they're eaten by the wildlife.
21	21	"Paint That a Shame"	Alice Prodanou	December 16, 2018	December 15, 2018	V121	0.58
LeShawna wins two tickets to "Wild Ride Kingdom", and she makes the other have a paint balloon battle to decide who gets the other ticket.
22	22	"Snots Landing"	Laurie Elliott	December 16, 2018	December 22, 2018	V122	0.70
A missing piece in Courtney's diorama gets stuck up Beth's nose, and Beth tries to get it out before Courtney notices.
23	23	"Know it All"	Craig Brown	December 30, 2018	December 29, 2018	V123	0.50
Courtney must go the whole day without telling the others what to do, but the other kids try to push her to her limit.
24	24	"A Licking Time Bomb"	Andrew Harrison	December 30, 2018	February 2, 2019	V124	0.65
Owen and Noah become cookie salesmen, but Owen becomes stressed because he's not allowed to tell anyone the secret ingredient.
25	25	"From Badge to Worse"	Steve Westren	February 3, 2019	February 9, 2019	V125	0.55
In order to receive her final badge, Courtney must become Gwen's friend.
26	26	"Toys Will Be Toys"	Steve Westren	February 10, 2019	February 16, 2019	V126	0.64
Courtney tries to become an internet-famous toy reviewer with help from Bridgette, but none of her videos are gaining traction, and she's constantly overshadowed by Jude and Owen's videos.
27	27	"All Up In Your Drill"	Miles Smith	February 10, 2019	February 23, 2019	V127	0.64
Duncan wants to be appointed to class firefighter and make Courtney give up that role, but when an actual emergency happens, he is unprepared.
28	28	"Snow Way Out"	Laurie Elliott	February 3, 2019	March 2, 2019	V128	0.68
The kids try to get Owen to stop wearing his new snowsuit all the time. However, he refuses and keeps wearing it, much to the kids' annoyance.
29	29	"Stay Goth, Poodle Girl, Stay Goth"	Alice Prodanou	February 24, 2019	March 9, 2019	V129	0.55
Gwen accidentally brings her toy poodle to school, and she tries to keep it hidden for the day before the other kids find out about it.
30	30	"Gum and Gummer"	Laurie Elliott	February 24, 2019	March 16, 2019	V130	0.66
Beth accidentally gets her gum stuck in LeShawna's hair, and the former must get it out before the latter notices.
31	31	"Invasion of the Booger Snatchers"	Miles Smith	March 24, 2019	March 23, 2019	V131	0.56
Aliens from another planet take over the bodies of everyone in the daycare, and Harold must figure out how to stop them with Izzy's help.
32	32	"Wristy Business"	Shawn Kalb	March 24, 2019	March 30, 2019	V132	0.69
Beth and LeShawna keep faking injuries to get more attention from everyone at the daycare, but their competing gets way out of control.
33	33	"Melter Skelter"	Josh Gal	March 31, 2019	March 30, 2019	V133	0.69
After seeing an ad for a new expensive toy, the kids ask Chef to get it for them, but he refuses since they have enough toys already, so Beth sets out to destroy all the toys in the daycare.
34	34	"The Never Gwending Story"	Mike Kiss	March 31, 2019	April 6, 2019	V134	0.53
Tired of children's stories, Gwen tells the class her own scary take on a children's story, but the monster she made up has seemingly come to life.
35	35	"There Are No Hoppy Endings"	Miles Smith	April 21, 2019	April 15, 2019	V135	0.47
Chef struggles to maintain his sanity when the kids continue to blame a stuffed rabbit named Hoppy for everything bad they do.
36	36	"Too Much of a Goo'd Thing"	Laurie Elliott	April 27, 2019	April 22, 2019	V136	0.46
Beth refuses to believe that the adorable goo creature she created out of slime is consuming the kids until she and Gwen are the only two left in class.
37	37	"The Price of Advice"	Ashley Lannigan	April 27, 2019	April 29, 2019	V137	0.46
After a paper origami fortune teller tells Izzy she's the world's best advice giver, she's determined to prove it.
38	38	"Mother of All Cards"	Laurie Elliott	May 26, 2019	May 6, 2019	V138	0.50
Chef attempts to trick the kids into making his mother cards after he forgets Mother's Day.
39	39	"Duncan Disorderly"	Josh Gal	April 21, 2019	May 13, 2019	V139	0.48
When Duncan escapes from the class nature walk, he realises that Cody and Beth are still with him. He takes them on a day through the city and learns that child care is harder than it looks. Meanwhile, on the nature walk, Chef gets stuck working at a restaurant after the kids need to use the bathroom.
40	40	"Soother or Later"	Ashley Lannigan	May 5, 2019	May 20, 2019	V140	0.51
Duncan finally manages to break out, only to realize that there is currently a thunderstorm, so along with Izzy, he embarks on an adventure back to the daycare.
41	41	"Camping is In Tents" (Note: "Camping is In Tents" is a half-hour special.)	Josh Gal	June 10, 2019	May 27, 2019	V141	0.38
A class camping trip turns into a treasure hunt while Harold is determined to catch Bigfoot and keep everyone safe.
42	42	"Mutt Ado About Owen"	Laurie Elliott	May 5, 2019	November 2, 2019	V142	0.48
After accidentally hypnotizing Owen into being a dog, Harold thinks he must reverse the hypnosis to avoid going to jail.
43	43	"Simons Are Forever"	Miles Smith	May 26, 2019	November 2, 2019	V143	0.47
Duncan and Leshawna try to take advantage of Izzy's love for the game of Simon Says.
44	44	"Stop! Hamster Time"	Miles Smith	June 23, 2019	November 9, 2019	V144	0.54
Owen takes over the job of caring for the class hamster and learns that he's evil.
45	45	"Driving Miss Crazy"	Ashley Lannigan	June 23, 2019	November 9, 2019	V145	0.56
Duncan leads Beth to believe she's broken his battery-powered bike and makes her chauffeur him around in a wagon for the day as punishment.
46	46	"Weiner Takes All"	Mike Kiss	June 30, 2019	November 16, 2019	V146	0.47
After forgetting to book a Hot Diggity Doggity Dog mascot on National Hotdog Day, Chef tries to pass off an Australian man dressed as a kangaroo as a substitute.
47	47	"Apoca-lice Now"	Ashley Lannigan	June 30, 2019	November 16, 2019	V147	0.44
When Chef brokers a truce with lice by asking three kids to "host" them on their heads, Courtney instigates a kid vs. lice war.
48	48	"Gnome More Mister Nice Guy"	Miles Smith	July 28, 2019	November 23, 2019	V148	0.46
When the daycare gets taken over by evil gnomes, Duncan decides to work with the gnomes.
49	49	"Look Who's Clocking"	Mike Kiss	July 28, 2019	November 23, 2019	V149	0.51
When Harold's warnings not to mess with the clock go ignored, the kids are forced to save themselves when Duncan tears a hole in the fabric of time.
50	50	"Harold Swatter and the Goblet of Flies"	Alice Prodanou	August 4, 2019	November 30, 2019	V150	0.36
After finding what he believes to be a magic wand, Owen thinks he has accidentally turned Harold into a housefly.
51	51	"Stink. Stank. Stunk."	Laurie Elliott	August 4, 2019	November 30, 2019	V151	0.37
When a skunk comes seeking its annual revenge on Chef, Duncan sees it as an opportunity to get a break from daycare.

=== Season 2 (2020–21) ===
No. overall	No. in season	Title	Written by	Canadian air date	U.S. air date	Prod. code	U.S. viewers (millions)
52	1	"Glove Glove Me Do"	Miles Smith	April 4, 2020	January 11, 2020 (Note: "Glove Glove Me Do" was released on the Cartoon Network website on December 27, 2019.)	CN202	0.47
Owen finds two magical gloves at the Lost and Found that make him perfect at everything, but the greatness comes at a high price.
53	2	"Robo Teacher"	Terry McGurrin	April 4, 2020	January 18, 2020	CN201	0.47
Chef gets replaced with another teacher, to the kids' excitement. Little do they know that said teacher is actually a robot in disguise.
54	3	"The Tooth About Zombies"	Andrew Shenkman	April 11, 2020	January 25, 2020	CN203	0.48
When Beth doesn't want to see the dental hygienist and Gwen wants to see the annual zombie parade, they both try to help each other with their situations.
55	4	"Lie-Ranosaurus Wrecked"	Miles Smith	April 11, 2020	February 1, 2020	CN204	0.58
Owen pretends to be Izzy's dinosaur after she believes dinosaurs are found underground.
56	5	"An Egg-stremely Bad Idea"	Laurie Elliott	April 18, 2020	February 8, 2020	CN205	0.41
Izzy and Owen attempt to give Gwen's egg chair so as to brighten her day, but she is utterly enraged by their efforts, so they must fix their mistake.
57	6	"Exercising the Demons"	Andrew Harrison	April 18, 2020	February 8, 2020	CN206	0.40
Fearing for the kids' health, Chef gets a trainer to put them through rigorous exercise.
58	7	"Pudding the Planet First"	Terry McGurrin	April 25, 2020	April 18, 2020	CN207	0.39
After Chef says opposing viewpoints make the world more interesting and fun, Izzy applies it in the worst way possible.
59	8	"Supply Mom"	Laurie Elliott	April 25, 2020	April 18, 2020	CN208	0.39
When Chef's mom becomes the supply teacher for a day, Duncan replaces Chef's to-do list with one of his own.
60	9	"Mooshy Mon Mons"	Andrew Shenkman	May 2, 2020	April 25, 2020	CN209	0.33
After eating Chef's extremely rare and expensive chocolates, Courtney, Owen, Izzy and Beth travel all the way to the Norberian Alps of Fruffenberg to replace them.
61	10	"Student Becomes the Teacher"	Alice Prodanou	May 2, 2020	April 25, 2020	CN210	0.31
Chef is knocked unconscious right before a School Board Evaluator shows up for a big review, so Owen has to fill in to prevent Chef to lose his Teaching License and to ensure the kids earn the pony ride Chef promised for good behavior.
62	11	"Beth and the Beanstalk"	Terry McGurrin	June 27, 2020	May 2, 2020	CN211	0.27
When Chef confiscates Beth's chocolate bar, she gets Jellybeans from Owen and when she spits them out, a giant beanstalk grows in the daycare center, leading Beth, Owen and Izzy to climb up this magical beanstalk.
63	12	"Piñata Regatta"	Miles Smith	July 18, 2020	May 2, 2020	CN212	0.29
It is Cinco de Mayo and everyone has knocked every piñata but one, when Izzy finds it she decides to befriend it but not before it becomes a giant monster.
64	13	"A Dame-gerous Game"	Andrew Shenkman	July 18, 2020	May 9, 2020	CN213	0.37
After winning a Hide and Seek competition, Bridgette, Cody, Leshawna and Owen are invited on a private island by a former champion who forces them to play for their freedom.
65	14	"Royal Flush"	Andrew Harrison	November 7, 2020	May 9, 2020	CN214	0.36
The other kids fear Harold has accidentally flushed himself down Chef's fancy new toilet so they travel into the sewer on a rescue mission.
66	15	"Total Eclipse of the Fart"	Josh Gal	November 7, 2020	May 16, 2020	CN215	0.26
When Leshawna accidentally swallows her baby tooth, she tries to kidnap the tooth fairy to get her tooth fairy money, but instead she kidnaps Smellion, the fart fairy.
67	16	"Dissing Cousins" (Note: "Dissing Cousins" is a half-hour special.)	Miles Smith	January 4, 2021	May 23, 2020	CN216 CN217	0.30
It's Cousins’ Day at the daycare and Chef has invited Gwen and Owen’s cousins Ella and Max Mayhem respectively.
68	17	"For a Few Duncans More"	Josh Gal	January 5, 2021	September 14, 2020	CN218	0.34
When Chef brings in a new copy machine on Pizza day, Duncan tests it on himself and it brings paper copy's of himself to life.
69	18	"He Who Wears the Clown"	Miles Smith	January 5, 2021	September 14, 2020	CN219	0.34
When a clown shows up at daycare for Harold's birthday, Owen wishes to be a clown so the clown has him honk on his nose three times. Owen becomes a clown, but eventually learns that everything has a price on it.
70	19	"Us 'R' Toys"	Andrew Shenkman	January 6, 2021	September 15, 2020	CN220	0.25
When Chef finds one of his old toys in his garage, the kids don't find it interesting until Chef accidentally wished him, Duncan, and Gwen into one of his old toys with a wishing stone.
71	20	"Dream Worriers"	Josh Gal	January 6, 2021	September 15, 2020	CN221	0.26
When Izzy had a crazy dream, she was gonna talk to Bridgette, Leshawna and Owen about it, but forgets all about it, but Harold tells them if someone forgets something in their dreams, their brains will turn into potato soup and comes out of your brain, leading to Leshawna, Bridgette and Owen to go into her brain and fix her dreams.
72	21	"Grody to the Maximum"	Miles Smith	January 7, 2021	September 16, 2020	CN222	0.26
Cody is pretending to be a new kid named Grody so he can be as cool as the others with a new cool shirt but there's only one person who isn't believing in him ...Courtney.
73	22	"Wiggin' Out"	Andrew Harrison	January 7, 2021	September 16, 2020	CN223	0.27
When Bridgette won a plague for donating her hair for a hairless cat charity, Leshawna, Izzy and Owen want in to so they could get a plague like Bridgette.
74	23	"The Upside of Hunger"	Alix Markman	January 8, 2021	September 17, 2020	CN224	0.26
When Owen is left hungering with no food to eat, he goes to his secret pantry to bake a cake but it opens a portal to a dimension where everything is the opposite of themselves.
75	24	"Fire in the Hole"	Amanda McNeice	January 8, 2021	September 17, 2020	CN225	0.25
When Duncan makes a chili so hot, it accidentally burns right through the core of the Earth where Terry Spice, ruler of the Underworld wants more of his chili but Duncan refuses to make more of it, so he brings Gwen, Owen, Leshawna and Beth's fears to life to make him make more of his chili for him.
76	25	"Ghoul Spirit"	Miles Smith	October 31, 2021	October 26, 2020	CN226	0.32
Gwen is upset because she got a friendly ghost named Floater instead of scary one, so Courtney and Owen try to help him be scary for her, but when Chef is noticing all the strange things around the Daycare, he calls a ghost hunter to take care of the problem.
77	26	"Duncan Carving"	Miles Smith	October 31, 2021	October 26, 2020	CN227	0.28
When Duncan finishes all of his candy after Halloween, he tries to ask Beth, Owen, Courtney and Cody for their candy but they refuse, making Duncan upset but not before hearing a story of Izzy where she tells the story of Carvin Marvin, a kid who ate pumpkin seeds on Halloween and turned his head into a Jack 'o Lantern who eats kids if they don't have any candy, giving Duncan the idea to trick his classmates into giving him candy after hearing Izzy's story.
78	27	"Tu Ba Or Not Tu Ba"	Andrew Shenkman	March 15, 2021	October 27, 2020	CN228	0.27
When Chefs gets an audition to be on Tubilicious after the band saw him in his Tuba video, the kids let Noah train him for the audition while they look for a new teacher if Chef accepts the gig.
79	28	"Dude Where's Macaw"	Miles Smith	March 15, 2021	October 28, 2020	CN229	0.28
After Harold and Duncan accidentally see Chef playing an old game called Macaw Wash and used to be an old champion of the game, they challenge Chef to play a name game called Pain Apple against the reigning champion of the game, Beth.
80	29	"Way Back Wendel"	Amanda McNeice	March 16, 2021	October 29, 2020	CN230	0.20
Courtney accidentally digs up a time capsule while competing against the rest of the class and accidentally find Wendel, a black and white kid who put himself their in order to find a new challenger in the future, with Courtney accepting his challenge after he insults her, but little do they know, the longer the time capsule stays here, the more the world will turn black and white if Wendel stays here any longer.
81	30	"Stingin' in the Rain"	Josh Gal	March 16, 2021	October 30, 2020	CN231	0.23
After Courtney forgets her ancient coin for show and tell, she has Chef look for it but when he is accidentally locked outside of the daycare, he tries to get the kids to open the door for him but they refuse, thinking he is a burglar.
82	31	"Cartoon Realism"	Andrew Shenkman	March 17, 2021	November 14, 2020	CN232	0.31
While visiting to a studio who makes the Chinchillie Chinchilla cartoon, Beth and Gwen meet the real cartoon character from the show itself and discovers he comes from an alternate reality that the studio "borrowed" into making the Chinchillie Chinchilla cartoon.
83	32	"OWW"	Andrew Harrison	March 17, 2021	November 14, 2020	CN233	0.32
The kids discover that Chef used to be in a wrestling team called Hot Lunch where he used to be called Soup with his partner Sammy, they convince him on how to be wrestlers in order to not listen to Courtney's boring Shakespeare performance.
84	33	"Gobble Head"	Miles Smith	April 12, 2021	November 21, 2020	CN234	0.30
When the kids aren't appreciating Chef on Appreciation Day, he tries to make them a turkey to make them appreciate him, but accidentally summons Gobble Head the Cyborg Turkey from the Cookro Nomicon who hunts unappreciated kids for sport.
85	34	"Me, My Elf, and I"	Laurie Elliott	December 20, 2020	December 5, 2020	CN235	0.26
Duncan realizes he isn't going to be getting any gifts on Christmas so he tricks Chef and his friends into going to the North Pole and deleting the Naughty List from Santa's computer so he can get gifts on Christmas.
86	35	"Snow Country for Old Men"	Miles Smith	December 20, 2020	December 5, 2020	CN236	0.24
Chef accidentally brings Flakey the Snowman to life after the kids don't appreciate him in his Winter Wonderman Persona and they start to like Flakey more than Chef but this snowman isn't as jolly as he looks.
87	36	"Jelly Aches"	Miles Smith	March 18, 2021	December 12, 2020	CN237	0.26
A jealousy troll wreaks havoc around the school, but Jude gets in the way of her mishap!
88	37	"Simply Perfect"	Amanda McNeice	March 18, 2021	December 12, 2020	CN238	0.26
Courtney orders a Brainiac Ray to help the students prepare for a big test, but she and Gwen find out that it doesn't work as advertised.
89	38	"Baby Brother Blues"	Laurie Elliott	March 19, 2021	December 19, 2020	CN239	0.31
Beth gets a baby brother, but finds a family at the zoo in fear of getting replaced. Meanwhile, back at the daycare, Owen and Noah stall Beth's mother to keep her from finding out what's going on.
90	39	"Space Codyty"	Andrew Shenkman	March 19, 2021	December 19, 2020	CN240	0.25
Izzy thinks that Cody is an alien, so she, Cody, and Chef go into space, to find out that Cody is an alien!
91	40	"Snack to the Future"	Josh Gal	April 12, 2021	January 23, 2021	CN241	0.22
In order to get his favorite snack sooner, Owen travels to the future, but accidentally travels to the past with Harold, Gwen, and Izzy.
92	41	"The Gold and the Stickerful"	Amanda McNeice	April 13, 2021	January 23, 2021	CN242	0.24
Courtney gets obsessed with Chef's new sticker program, and it is up to the others (and Courtney's brain) to save her.
93	42	"Bad Seed"	Andrew Harrison	April 13, 2021	January 30, 2021	CN243	0.27
Izzy turns her new baby plant into a love monster.
94	43	"A Fish Called Leshawna"	Amanda McNeice	April 14, 2021	February 6, 2021	CN244	0.28
After eating magical fish sticks, LeShawna achieves her life's dream and becomes a mermaid!
95	44	"Double Oh Beth"	Andrew Harrison	April 14, 2021	February 13, 2021	CN245	0.21
Beth is revealed to be a spy, and when she has to tackle watching Cody, saving Chef, and defeating her arch-nemesis Beartop Manbelow, it's up to Double-O-Beth to save the day!
96	45	"Duncan Duty"	Miles Smith	April 15, 2021	February 20, 2021	CN246	0.19
Tired of Duncan's pranks, Chef gets Beth to make sure Duncan's pranking days are over.
97	46	"Encore'tney"	Andrew Shenkman	April 15, 2021	February 27, 2021	CN247	0.24
Courtney finds a magical book that wants her to be perfect, but the book brings her into a time-loop and only LeShawna can help Courtney before the book completely takes over her life!
98	47	"Life of Pie"	Miles Smith	April 16, 2021	March 6, 2021	CN248	0.16
Owen, Jude, and Izzy bring a pizza to life and help him find a new purpose instead of being eaten.
99	48	"AbaracaDuncan"	Miles Smith	April 16, 2021	March 13, 2021	CN249	0.28
Duncan uses magic as a chance to escape from the daycare, but Harold becomes the target of a sorcer hunt. It's up to Duncan to save him before Harold goes Presto!
100	49	"Shock & AWW"	Andrew Harrison	July 4, 2021	March 20, 2021	CN250	0.26
Courtney orders a new carpet with static electricity powers, and the kids do whatever they can to make Courtney give them back the old carpet.
101	50	"School District 9"	George Elliott	July 4, 2021	March 27, 2021	CN251	0.31
Owen wants to prove that he has skills to offer to the world.
102	51	"The A-Bok-Bok-Bokalypse"	Andrew Harrison	June 27, 2020	March 27, 2021	CN252	0.30
When everybody at the school gets chicken pox, Jude, Courtney, Izzy, and Gwen go to the Chicken Queen to apologize for their past misdeeds. Unfortunately, Jude starts to turn into a chicken.

=== Season 3 (2021–22) ===
No. overall	No. in season	Title	Written by	Canadian air date	U.S. air date	Prod. code	U.S. viewers (millions)
103	1	"Gumbearable"	Laurie Elliott	June 6, 2021	April 3, 2021	CN301	0.18
Owen thinks he swallowed gum and has to jump into a volcano, but when it turns out it stuck to his teddy bear, the kids must stop him.
104	2	"Whack Mirror"	Andrew Harrison	June 6, 2021	April 17, 2021	CN302	0.17
Cody and Beth make faces in a haunted mirror, but then they come to life and frame them.
105	3	"Broken Back Kotter"	Andrew Shenkman	June 13, 2021	April 24, 2021	CN303	0.22
Izzy nominates Chef for a brutal competition, but when Chef tries to avoid it, the kids try and make him win, but accidentally make him freeze in fear, so they use technology to make him move.
106	4	"Weekend at Buddy's"	Miles Smith	June 13, 2021	May 1, 2021	CN304	0.22
When Duncan accidentally destroys Cody’s toy friend Buddy, Owen and Beth have to find a way to stop Cody from learning the truth.
107	5	"MacArthur Park"	Andrew Harrison	June 20, 2021	May 8, 2021	CN305	0.17
MacArthur plans to destroy the school due to the people there making her lose jobs constantly. Only Cody can make MacArthur have a change of heart.
108	6	"Last Mom Standing"	Andrew Shenkman	June 20, 2021	May 15, 2021	CN306	0.22
When Mrs. Hatchet and Leshawna's grandma drop off their little ones at the daycare at the same time, it results into a battle of the last mom standing and what seems like sweet love at first turns into a competition that goes way too far!
109	7	"Carmageddon"	Andrew Shenkman	June 27, 2021	May 22, 2021	CN307	0.24
When Chef gets a new indestructible car, Duncan becomes bugged and is determined to destroy it.
110	8	"Sugar & Spice & Lightning & Frights"	Laurie Elliott	June 27, 2021	May 29, 2021	CN308	0.16
Two kids, Sugar and Lightning, become the newest students at the daycare. But Sugar's competitive nature and Lightning's heroic nature leads to drama with Leshawna and Duncan respectively.
111	9	"Breaking Bite"	Andrew Harrison	September 5, 2021	July 5, 2021	CN309	0.17
Beth becomes the big dog on campus after she bites Duncan, but being the big dog is a dangerous thing, especially when she didn't actually bite anybody.
112	10	"I Dream of Meanie"	Miles Smith	September 5, 2021	July 6, 2021	CN310	0.22
When Cody keeps screaming in his sleep, Gwen and Duncan take a trip into his dreams to see what is scaring him.
113	11	"Squirrels Squirrels Squirrels"	Andrew Harrison	September 12, 2021	July 7, 2021	CN311	0.19
114	12	"Say Hello to My Little Friends"	Laurie Elliott	September 12, 2021	July 8, 2021	CN312	0.28
115	13	"WaterHose-Five"	Joel Buxton	September 19, 2021	July 12, 2021	CN313	0.33
116	14	"Cody the Barbarian"	Andrew Shenkman	September 19, 2021	July 13, 2021	CN314	0.23
117	15	"TP2: Judgement Bidet"	Andrew Harrison	September 26, 2021	July 14, 2021	CN315	0.19
Beth, Harold and Owen try to uncover why there is a toilet paper shortage only to find a gator singer named Sewer Mike, who steals toilet paper to use as his audience.
118	16	"Dial B for Birder"	Amanda McNeice	September 26, 2021	July 15, 2021	CN316	0.20
Chef gets a new parrot named Tommy Ouiseau which steals the attention away from Sugar's performances. Tommy starts becoming an evil bird and sets up dangerous traps on Chef, as well as stealing from other places too. Harold finally confesses his secrets to Chef and Tommy is put in bird jail.
119	17	"A Hole Lot of Trouble"	Miles Smith	October 3, 2021	July 19, 2021	CN317	0.18
120	18	"A Tall Tale"	Andrew Harrison	October 3, 2021	July 20, 2021	CN318	0.24
121	19	"Chews Wisely"	Laurie Elliott	October 10, 2021	July 21, 2021	CN319	0.23
122	20	"A Dingo Ate My Duncan"	Aisha Brown	October 10, 2021	July 22, 2021	CN320	0.19
123	21	"Erase Yer Head"	Miles Smith	October 17, 2021	September 4, 2021	CN321	0.23
124	22	"Teacher, Soldier, Chef, Spy"	Andrew Shenkman	October 17, 2021	September 11, 2021	CN322	0.23
125	23	"Thingameroo"	Andrew Harrison	October 24, 2021	September 18, 2021	CN323	0.16
126	24	"CodE.T."	Andrew Harrison	October 24, 2021	September 25, 2021	CN324	0.13
Cody gets ill and asks the other students to call his home.
127	25	"Quiche It Goodbye"	Ben Joseph	November 21, 2021	October 2, 2021	CN325	0.16
128	26	"Ice Guys Finish Last"	Andrew Harrison	November 21, 2021	October 9, 2021	CN326	0.15
129	27	"Trousering Inferno"	Andrew Shenkman	November 28, 2021	October 16, 2021	CN327	0.22
130	28	"The Big Bangs Theory"	Miles Smith	November 28, 2021	October 23, 2021	CN328	0.19
131	29	"Gwen Scary, Gwen Lost" (Note: "Gwen Scary, Gwen Lost" is a half-hour special.)	Laurie Elliott	October 31, 2021	October 29, 2021	CN329 CN330	0.16
132	30	"Mad Math: Taffy Road"	Amanda McNeice	December 5, 2021	November 6, 2021	CN330	0.19
133	31	"Bearly Edible"	Jadiel Dowlin	December 5, 2021	November 13, 2021	CN331	0.21
134	32	"Not for the Paint of Heart"	Ben Joseph	December 12, 2021	November 20, 2021	CN332	0.13
135	33	"Daycare of Rock"	Laurie Elliott	December 12, 2021	November 27, 2021	CN333	0.18
136	34	"Aches and Ladders"	Andrew Harrison	March 6, 2022	December 4, 2021	CN334	0.12
137	35	"The Tree Stooges Save Christmas" (Note: "The Tree Stooges Save Christmas" is a half-hour special.)	Andrew Harrison Miles Smith	December 19, 2021	December 9, 2021	CN335 CN336	0.16
138	36	"Cactus Makes Perfect"	Miles Smith	March 6, 2022	February 7, 2022	CN337	0.11
Cody tries to get a new best friend after his horoscope predicted that he'll lose his BFF, Lightning. When he finally becomes friends with a cactus in which he names "Ouchie," Lightning feels jealous over it and tries to get Cody back by taking his cactus away during naptime.
139	37	"Virtual Reality Bites"	Andrew Harrison	March 13, 2022	February 8, 2022	CN338	0.16
140	38	"The Opening Act"	Ben Joseph	March 13, 2022	February 9, 2022	CN339	0.09
141	39	"Van Hogling"	Amanda McNeice	March 20, 2022	February 10, 2022	CN340	0.08
142	40	"Ticking Crime Bomb"	Andrew Harrison	March 20, 2022	February 11, 2022	CN341	0.10
143	41	"Knit Wit"	Miles Smith	July 17, 2022	June 6, 2022	CN342	0.11
144	42	"The Fuss on the Bus"	Andrew Shenkman	July 17, 2022	June 7, 2022	CN343	0.18
145	43	"The Cone-versation"	Ben Joseph	July 24, 2022	June 8, 2022	CN344	0.13
146	44	"Oozing Talent"	Andrew Harrison	July 24, 2022	June 9, 2022	CN345	0.15
147	45	"Senior Sinisters"	Jadiel Dowlin	July 31, 2022	June 10, 2022	CN346	0.10
148	46	"Be Claws I Love You, Shelley"	Laurie Elliott	July 31, 2022	July 18, 2022	CN347	0.07
149	47	"Total Trauma Rama"	Miles Smith	August 7, 2022	July 19, 2022	CN348	0.10
150	48	"The Doomed Ballooned Marooned"	Harmeet Bhatti	August 7, 2022	July 20, 2022	CN349	0.11
151	49	"Legends of the Paul"	George Elliott	August 14, 2022	July 21, 2022	CN350	0.14
152	50	"A Bridgette Too Far"	Andrew Harrison	August 14, 2022	July 22, 2022	CN351	N/A

== Special (2023) ==
Title	Written by	Canadian air date	U.S. air date	Prod. code	U.S. viewers (millions)
"A Very Special Special That's Quite Special"	Miles G. Smith	April 22, 2023	April 15, 2023	TBA	0.14
