= Laurie Elliott =

Canadian comedian (born 1971)

- Born: January 18, 1971 (age 55); Montreal, Quebec, Canada
- Occupations: Actress, television writer, comedian
- Years active: 1994–present

Laurie Elliott (born January 18, 1971) is a Canadian actress, television writer, and stand-up comedian. She is best known as the voice of Jo from Total Drama. She also worked as a writer of Nickelodeon's Corn & Peg for its two seasons (2019–2020).

== Career ==
She has appeared in The Red Green Show, and won the 2006 Canadian Comedy Award as Best Female Stand-up. She is also a member of the sketch comedy duo Kevlor-2000 with Kevin MacDonald.

In 2003, Elliott participated in an April Fool's prank staged by Canada's Comedy Network, which announced that she was slated to star in a new remake of the 1970s Canadian sitcom The Trouble with Tracy.

Elliott participated in the Canadian live comedy show Video on Trial which also starred fellow Canadian comedians such as Debra DiGiovanni, Ron Sparks and Nikki Payne.

Elliot starred in Atomic Betty as Noah Parker, Rodney Patella in Moville Mysteries, and voiced Jo on Skatoony, Total Drama Revenge of the Island and Total Drama: All-Stars. Elliot has also written quite a few episodes of the Total Drama television series, including the Total Drama World Tour episodes "Slap Slap Revolution", "The EX-Files", "Aftermath Aftermayhem" and "African Lying Safari", the Total Drama: Revenge of the Island episodes "Ice Ice Baby", "The Treasure Island of Dr. McLean" and "The Enchanted Franken-Forest", the Total Drama: All-Stars episodes "Food Fright", "Suckers Punched", and "The Obsta-Kill Course", the Total Drama: Pahkitew Island episodes "I Love You, Grease Pig", "A Blast from the Past", and "Three Zones and a Baby", and the Total Drama spin-off series Total Drama Presents: The Ridonculous Race episodes "French Is an Eiffel Language", "Brazilian Pain Forest", and "New Beijinging". She also wrote episodes of Corn & Peg.

== Awards and nominations ==
Year	Award	Category	Work	Result	Ref
2000	Tim Sims Encouragement Fund Award	Cream of Comedy	Various	Won	
2006	Gemini Awards	Best Ensemble Performance in a Comedy Program or Series	The Red Green Show	Nominated	
2009	Canadian Comedy Awards	Best Taped Live Performance	Just For Laughs Gala	Nominated	
2010	Canadian Comedy Awards	Best Performance by a Female - Television	Almost Audrey	Won	
2010	Canadian Comedy Awards	Best Female Stand-Up	Various	Won	
2013	Canadian Comedy Awards	Best Female Stand-Up	Various	Nominated	
2014	Canadian Comedy Awards	Best Performance by a Female - Web	But I'm Chris Jericho!	Nominated	
2024	Juno Award	Comedy Album of the Year	Sexiest Fish in the Lake	Nominated	
