= James Hurst (screenwriter) =

Canadian television producer and writer

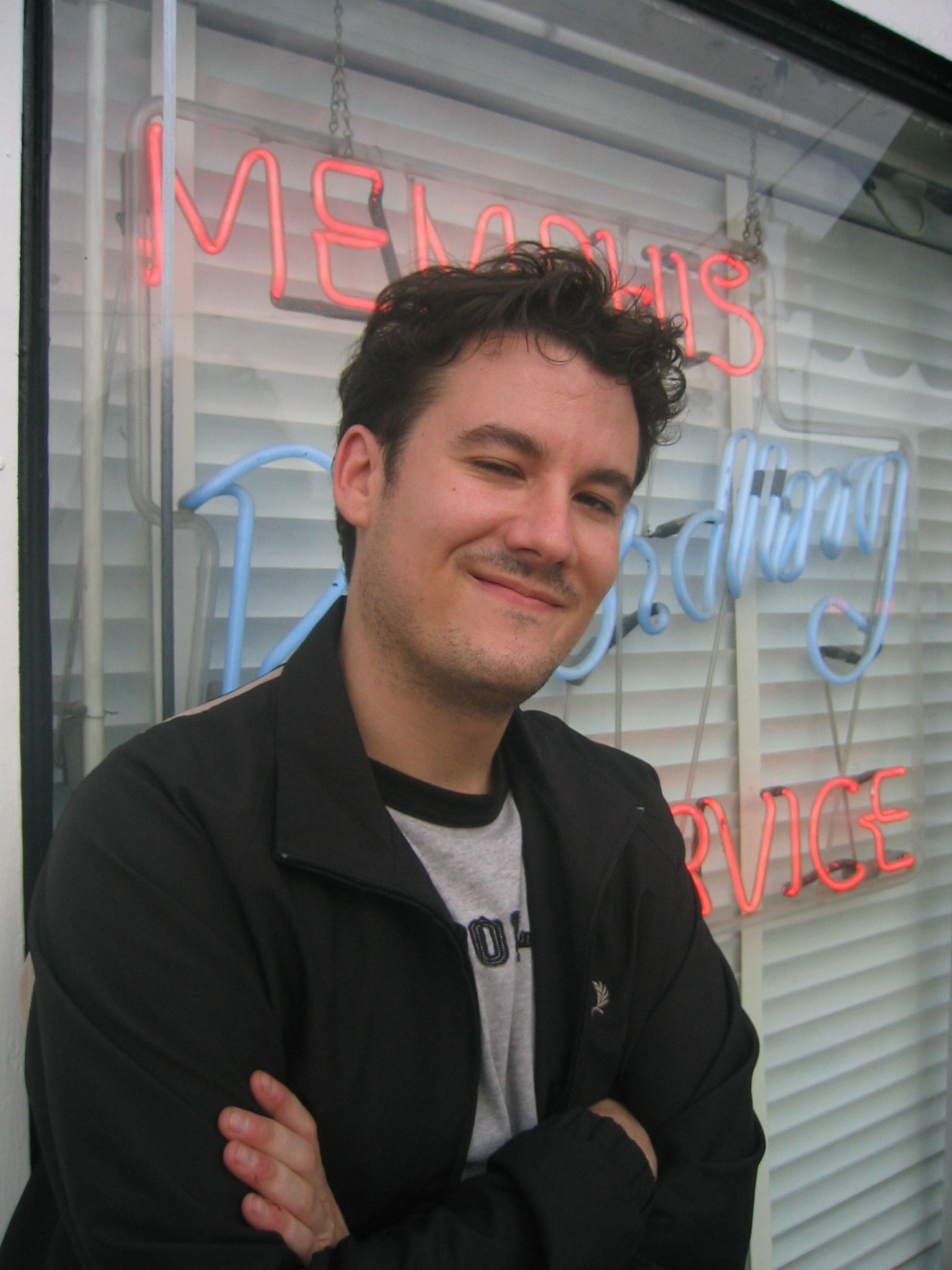
- Hurst in 2008
- Born: Montreal, Canada,
- Education: York University
- Occupations: Television producer and writer

James Hurst is a Canadian writer/creator/producer of television series with experience in scripted drama and comedy series in Canada. He launched his career with the teen drama series Degrassi: The Next Generation (CTV & TeenNick), writing thirty episodes and showrunning seasons five and six. He went on to write/produce many series, including Flashpoint (CTV and CBS), Being Erica (CBC and Soapnet), Sophie (CBC), Todd and the Book of Pure Evil (Space) and most recently The Listener (CTV and Fox Intl). As creator, James developed the concept and wrote the pilot for the teen music drama Instant Star (CTV and Teen Nick). Along with novelist Andrew Pyper, James is co-creator of a number of series in development.

A graduate of York University, James has won two WGC Screenwriting Awards (2004 and 2005) and received three nominations (2006, 2007, 2010). He has also received two Gemini nominations (2007 and 2004). Wearing a different hat, James has also contributed to WireTap and This American Life, both for Public Radio International.
