= Lucas the Spider =

Animated character created by Joshua Slice

- Lucas the Spider character
- First appearance: Lucas the Spider; November 5, 2017
- Created by: Joshua Slice
- Voiced by: Lucas Slice (shorts and YouTube Rewind 2018); Simon Webster (series)

In-universe information
- Species: Jumping spider
- Gender: Male

Lucas the Spider is an animated character created by animator Joshua Slice, named after and previously voiced by his nephew. Lucas is based on a jumping spider and has starred in multiple short YouTube videos between 2017 and 2019.

== History ==
The first Lucas the Spider video was uploaded on November 5, 2017. Lucas was met with a highly positive reception for his gentle and warm-hearted nature.

In 2018, a talking plushie of Lucas the Spider was released for sale online. In May 2018, the series was acquired by Canadian production company Fresh TV. In December 2018, Lucas the Spider appeared in YouTube Rewind 2018.

2020 saw no new YouTube episodes. In various replies within posts to comments on his Instagram, Slice has stated that they "haven't posted any new content for a while because the team is hard at work on the TV show!" A short upload on YouTube on July 29, 2021 announced then-upcoming episodes on the Cartoonito programming block on Cartoon Network. This was followed by more short cartoons and excerpts from television episodes.

A species of jumping spiders, Salticus lucasi, has been named after this character.

== YouTube episodes ==
YouTube episodes are between nineteen and eighty-five seconds in length.

No.	Title	YouTube premiere date
1	Lucas the Spider or Episode One	November 5, 2017
2	It's Cold Outside!	December 1, 2017
3	Playtime	December 24, 2017
4	Captured	January 20, 2018
5	Musical Spider	February 10, 2018
6	Polar Bear	March 4, 2018
7	Encore!	March 30, 2018
8	Giant Spider	May 19, 2018
9	Naptime	June 19, 2018
10	One Man Band	August 31, 2018
11	Spinning Webs	September 21, 2018
12	Scary Stories	October 12, 2018
13	New Friend	November 10, 2018
14	Don't Eat Me	December 20, 2018
15	I'm Starving!	February 14, 2019
16	What Is That?	April 20, 2019
17	Where Did It Go?	June 3, 2019
18	It Slipped	July 6, 2019
19	It's Hot	August 2, 2019
20	Anybody Home?	August 30, 2019
21	The Sky is Falling	October 4, 2019
22	The Imposter	October 25, 2019
23	Jumping Spider	November 28, 2019
24	Drawn Together	December 20, 2019

Following these, three compilation shorts were posted:

- All the Songs (March 5, 2021)
- Boop (April 16, 2021)
- How to be a Friend Like Lucas (May 21, 2021)

In February 2020, it was announced that a Lucas the Spider TV series has secured a global distribution deal with Cartoon Network and Boomerang. It is shown on Cartoon Network's Cartoonito block. A 'first look' cartoon titled "Fun with Findley" was uploaded on YouTube on July 29, 2021. In the following months, this was followed by more new shorts (initially introducing supporting characters from the TV series) and excerpts from the TV show (not mentioned in this table).

No.	Title	YouTube premiere date
25	Fun with Findley	July 29, 2021
26	Arlo's Lullaby	August 13, 2021
27	Extreme Bodhi	August 27, 2021
28	Stand Up Dimples	September 12, 2021
29	Marvelous Maizie	September 24, 2021
30	Hey Avocado	October 8, 2021
31	The Altogether Song	October 23, 2021
32	Web Practice (Note: An 'anniversary original episode repost' with a new animated leader. Available for one day only.)	November 19, 2021

== Characters ==
- Lucas is a jumping spider. He lives in a big, bright Victorian house called House with all his friends. His alter egos Dr. Lucas first appeared in "The Big Squeak", Detective Lucas first appeared in "Farewell Sweet Ride", and The Mighty Boop first appeared in "The Mighty Boop and Fly Wonder".
- Findley (a.k.a. Bzzz) is a housefly and one of the main characters. He is Lucas' best friend and sidekick. He loves eating anything from the garbage. He first appeared in "New Friend".
- Bodhi is a chameleon and one of Lucas' friends. She loves doing different sports like snowboarding and sometimes enjoys meditating. Because she's a chameleon, Bodhi also has the ability to change colors and turn invisible. She first appeared in "Extreme Bodhi".
- Avocado is a French Bulldog puppy. She mostly wears pink pajamas with bones on them, but wears different clothing in some episodes. She first appeared in "Hey Avocado".
- Arlo is a blue and white baby owl who lives outside in a tree along with his mother and Maizie. He sometimes visits Lucas and his other friends in House. He first appeared in "Arlo's Lullaby". Arlo's stuffed mouse is Wimble.
- Maizie is a bumblebee who lives outside along with Arlo, his mother, and her family. Maizie has a pink flower on her head. She often crashes somewhere, then calls it "landing". Maizie also visits Lucas and his other friends in House sometimes. She first appeared in "Marvelous Maizie".
- Dimples is a purple goldfish who lives in a tank with Weebiscuit and Hans. She first appeared in "Stand Up Dimples".
- Weebiscuit is a yellow seahorse who is one of the characters in Lucas the Spider. He is one of Lucas' friends who lives in a tank with Dimples and Hans. Unlike the other characters, he can't talk. He first appeared in "Stand Up Dimples".
- Ant is a recurring character. It is one of Lucas' friends. It first appeared in "Extreme Bodhi". As his name indicates is regular ant.
- Bird is a recurring character. Bird appears to be a female house sparrow, though she is often given a call that sounds more like a crow. She is Lucas' primary rival. She first appeared in "Encore".
- Moth is a minor character and antagonist. He has only appeared in "Ghost Camp", in which he flies around the slide which scares Lucas, and Lucas thinks he's Whitebone. As his name indicates, he is a regular moth
- Skunk is a minor character. She first appeared in "Skunked". As his names indicates, is regular skunk.
- Jump-Jump is a caterpillar who is a minor character. She is one of Lucas' friends. She has only appeared in "Jumping Pal".
- Robot is a minor character. He is known as the Beep Beep Beast in "Never Boop a Robot" when he malfunctions after falling off the table. He is later repaired in “Boops in the Night”. He is one of Lucas' rivals.
- Jennifer is the baby chick whom Lucas is friends with. She is an inanimate figure like Hans.
- Kevin (robot) and Irene (purple alien) live in the dollhouse. They are often seen both inside and outside the dollhouse. Both Kevin and Irene are also inanimate figures.

== Television series ==
Lucas the Spider
- Genre: Slapstick; Sci-fi; Comedy; Preschool
- Created by: Joshua Slice
- Directed by: Paul Brown
- Voices of: Simon Webster; Christian Micah-Don Campbell; Evie Loiselle; Antonina Battrick; McKenzie Cornelius; Ethan MacIver-Wright; Kaia Lee Ozdemir
- Theme music composer: Voodoo Highway Music
- Composer: Voodoo Highway Music
- Countries of origin: United States; Canada
- Original language: English
- No. of seasons: 1
- No. of episodes: 77

Production
- Executive producers: George Elliott; Brian Irving; Jennifer Pertsch; Tom McGillis; Matthew Wexler
- Producers: George Elliott; Suzy Queen; Ameena Siddique
- Editors: Annellie Samuel; Jason Pichonsky
- Running time: 7 minutes
- Production companies: Wexworks Media; Fresh TV

Original release
- Network: Cartoon Network, Max (US); Family Channel (Canada)
- Release: September 18, 2021 – December 1, 2023

In March 2018, following the purchase of the series by Fresh TV, the company announced to produce a long-form series based on the web series.

In February 2020, Cartoon Network acquired the US broadcast rights to the series for a broadcast in early 2021 on the main channel and on Boomerang. However, the series instead became a launch series for the Cartoonito block, and began airing on the block on September 18, 2021. The series left Cartoonito on September 23, 2022, and later HBO Max on September 30, leaving three episodes unaired in the US, however they would air in Canada. On August 31, 2023, the series returned to Max, with all episodes of Season 1. Season 1 began streaming on Netflix on October 30, 2023.

The series returned to the Cartoonito lineup on December 1, 2023 to air its last three episodes, but left the lineup again on April 5, 2024. In October 2024, the series began airing on Discovery Family.

=== Episodes ===
No.	Title	Written by	Original release date	U.S. viewers (millions)
1	"Too Hot to Handle"	Amanda McNeice	September 18, 2021 (Note: This episode was first released on the Cartoon Network app and video-on-demand services on September 13, 2021.)	0.08
2	"The Big Squeak"	Bec Hill	September 18, 2021	0.08
3	"Big Jumping Spider"	Matt Baker	September 18, 2021	0.08
4	"Ghost Camp"	Kristen McGregor	September 25, 2021	0.06
5	"Boo!"	Dave Ingham	September 25, 2021	0.06
6	"Never Boop a Robot"	Dave Ingham	September 25, 2021	0.06
7	"Lonesome Lucas"	Josh Gal	October 2, 2021	0.12
8	"I Can't See You"	Josh Gal	October 9, 2021 (Note: This episode was first released on the Cartoon Network app and video-on-demand services on October 2, 2021.)	N/A
9	"To Catch a Fly"	Dave Ingham	October 16, 2021	N/A
10	"Sliding"	Matt Baker	October 23, 2021	N/A
11	"Spinning Webs"	Amanda McNeice	October 30, 2021	N/A
12	"I'm Taking You In"	Josh Gal	November 6, 2021	N/A
13	"Something Up There"	Kristen McGregor	November 13, 2021	N/A
14	"Home Sweet Home"	Amanda McNeice	November 20, 2021	N/A
15	"Bye Bye Bee"	Amanda McGregor	November 27, 2021	N/A
16	"Jeepers Peepers"	Dave Ingham	December 4, 2021	N/A
17	"House is Breathing"	Josh Gal	December 11, 2021	N/A
18	"Boingo"	Bec Hill	December 18, 2021	N/A
19	"Findley's Bad Day"	Matt Baker	December 25, 2021 (Note: This episode was first released on the Cartoon Network app and video-on-demand services on December 18, 2021.)	N/A
20	"You Rang?"	Dave Ingham	January 9, 2022	N/A
21	"Do You Speak Dance?"	Bec Hill	January 16, 2022	N/A
22	"A New Spider in Town"	Josh Gal	January 16, 2022	N/A
23	"Dollhouse Mates"	Josh Gal	January 16, 2022	N/A
24	"Lucas We Have a Problem"	Matt Baker	January 23, 2022	N/A
25	"Egg-Scuse Me"	Bec Hill	January 23, 2022	N/A
26	"Pokey Dokey"	Amanda McNeice	January 23, 2022	N/A
27	"Boot Castle"	Josh Gal	February 3, 2022	N/A
28	"Avocado's Looooong Time Out"	Dave Ingham	February 3, 2022	N/A
29	"Tanks Giving"	Josh Gal	February 3, 2022	N/A
30	"Flying"	Dave Ingham	February 4, 2022	N/A
31	"Dr. Lucas Is in the House"	Josh Gal	February 4, 2022	N/A
32	"Arlo's Portrait"	Dave Ingham	February 4, 2022	N/A
33	"House Flies Don't Dance"	Josh Gal	February 11, 2022	N/A
34	"Flying the Nest"	Dave Ingham	February 11, 2022	N/A
35	"The Insult"	Unknown	February 11, 2022	N/A
36	"I'll Do it in a Minute"	Dave Ingham	February 18, 2022	N/A
37	"Cloud Gazing"	Josh Gal	February 18, 2022	N/A
38	"Don't Do That Arlo"	Dave Ingham	February 18, 2022	N/A
39	"Prickly Pals"	Josh Gal	April 29, 2022	N/A
40	"A Sting in the Tale"	Dave Ingham	April 29, 2022	N/A
41	"Tongue Twister"	Josh Gal	April 29, 2022	N/A
42	"Sleeping Dogs"	Josh Gal	May 6, 2022	N/A
43	"Skunked"	Dave Ingham	May 6, 2022	N/A
44	"Arlo And The Snake"	Dave Ingham	May 6, 2022	N/A
45	"Crack In the Tank"	Dave Ingham	May 13, 2022	N/A
46	"Big Mouth"	Dave Ingham	May 13, 2022	N/A
47	"Art From the Heart"	Josh Gal	May 13, 2022	N/A
48	"Lucas and His Friends"	Dave Ingham	May 20, 2022	N/A
49	"The Owl That Said Why"	Amanda McNeice	May 20, 2022	N/A
50	"Happy Burpday"	Josh Gal	May 20, 2022	N/A
51	"The Legend of Big Butt"	Dave Ingham	May 27, 2022	N/A
52	"Arlo Needs a Nap"	Amanda McNeice	May 27, 2022	N/A
53	"Everyone's a Critic"	Josh Gal	May 27, 2022	N/A
54	"Flash and Boom"	Josh Gal	June 3, 2022	N/A
55	"House Sitting"	Amanda McNeice	June 3, 2022	N/A
56	"Findley is Sick"	Dave Ingham	June 3, 2022	N/A
57	"A Song for Wimble"	Josh Gal	June 10, 2022 (Note: This episode was first released on the Cartoon Network app and video-on-demand services on June 3, 2022.)	N/A
58	"I Want My Baby Acorn Back"	Amanda McNeice	June 10, 2022	N/A
59	"The Giggles"	Dave Ingham	June 10, 2022	N/A
60	"Puppy Love"	Dave Ingham	September 6, 2022	N/A
61	"House Grand Prix"	Amanda McNeice	September 6, 2022	N/A
62	"Farewell Sweet Ride"	Dave Ingham	September 6, 2022	N/A
63	"The Mighty Boop and Fly Wonder"	Amanda McNeice	September 12, 2022	N/A
64	"Lucas and Findley Get Antsy"	Amanda McNeice	September 12, 2022	N/A
65	"Mock Me Not"	Josh Gal	September 12, 2022	N/A
66	"Jumping Pal"	Dave Ingham	September 19, 2022	N/A
67	"Trouble at the Top"	Dave Ingham	September 19, 2022	N/A
68	"Avacado's Fan"	Dave Ingham	September 19, 2022	N/A
69	"The Scent of a Dog"	Amanda McNeice	September 21, 2022 (Note: This episode was originally scheduled for September 26, 2022, but was pushed forward at the last minute)	N/A
70	"The Need for Seed"	Josh Gal	September 21, 2022	N/A
71	"Bloom Patrol"	Josh Gal	September 21, 2022	N/A
72	"Behind the Door"	Dave Ingham	September 22, 2022 (Note: This episode was originally scheduled for October 3, 2022, but was pushed forward at the last minute)	N/A
73	"Findley the Brave"	Matt Baker	September 22, 2022	N/A
74	"Fixing Up the Tree"	Dave Ingham	September 22, 2022	N/A
75	"Waiting for Maizie"	Unknown	December 1, 2023 (Note: This episode was originally scheduled for October 10, 2022) (Note: This episode was first available to stream on Max on August 31, 2023 and Netflix on October 30, 2023.)	N/A
76	"Boops in the Night"	Unknown	December 1, 2023	N/A
77	"Lucas the Pirate"	Unknown	December 1, 2023	N/A

== Ratings ==
Viewership and ratings per season of Lucas the Spider
Season	Episodes	First aired		Last aired		Avg. viewers (millions)
Season	Episodes	Date	Viewers (millions)	Date	Viewers (millions)	Avg. viewers (millions)
1	74	September 18, 2021	0.08	December 1, 2023	TBD	0.08
