= List of 6teen episodes =

6teen is a Canadian animated teen comedy drama television series created by Jennifer Pertsch and Tom McGillis and produced by Nelvana and Fresh TV. Set mainly in the fictional Galleria Mall, the show revolves around the lives of six sixteen-year-old friends as they explore their first part-time jobs, relationships, friendships, and other teenage issues. The series premiered on November 7, 2004 on Teletoon. In the United States, the series first premiered on Nickelodeon on December 18, 2005, and was removed from the schedule on May 13, 2006. The show later relaunched on Cartoon Network in 2008, where 24 episodes were unaired for censorship reasons. The series finale aired on February 11, 2010 and included an acoustic version of the theme song by Brian Melo. The show ended with a total of four seasons and 91 regular-length episodes, in addition to two one-hour specials.

A special reunion eight-minute PSA webisode titled "Vote, Dude!" was released on YouTube on September 12, 2018, with the original voice cast reprising their respective roles to raise awareness for voting in the 2018 US midterm elections.

== Series overview ==
Season	Episodes	Originally released	
Season	Episodes	First released	Last released
1	27	November 7, 2004	June 22, 2005
2	27	November 2, 2005	December 21, 2006
3	26	September 5, 2007	April 25, 2008
4	13	September 10, 2009	February 11, 2010
Webisode		September 12, 2018	

== Episodes ==
=== Season 1 (2004–05) ===
No.	Title	Written by	Original release date	Prod. code
1	"Take This Job and Squeeze It"	Jennifer Pertsch	November 7, 2004	101
Jen, Nikki, Jonesy, Jude, and Wyatt have all been friends since kindergarten. They all go to the mall to try to get jobs while on their holidays. They meet Caitlin, a 15-year-old spoiled girl (who goes to their high school), who finds out that she needs to get a job in order to pay back her father's credit card bill. Jen gives Caitlin her old job at the Squeeze, and Caitlin ends up as a sixth member of the gang. Caitlin's old friend, Tricia, ends their friendship because of Caitlin getting a job which leads to both of them in future disagreements.
2	"The Big Sickie"	Seán Cullen	November 14, 2004	102
The gang all agree: work sucks, and they need a day off. Jonesy, having gotten a new job at the amusement park, offers to sneak them in for a day off. Everyone is for it, except Jen. Therefore, the gang makes numerous attempts to get her to call in sick. Nikki doesn't accept Caitlin as a friend, since she has known the others since kindergarten. But eventually the two find common ground when Nikki notices Caitlin isn't as obnoxious as she seems. Jen ends up going to the amusement park, where Coach Halder catches her and puts her on probation; she doesn't care, and continues having fun. Note: "The Big Sickie" is the only episode of the first three seasons that Jonesy was not seen being fired from a job.
3	"The Slow and the Even-Tempered"	George Westerholm	November 21, 2004	112
Jude tries to teach Jen how to drive. Meanwhile, Jonesy gets employed by Ron the Rent-a-cop. Jen drives the car in the atrium into the fountain, and Jonesy gets fired. Ron makes Jonesy take off his uniform in front of the whole mall.
4	"A Lime to Party"	Tom McGillis	November 28, 2004	103
Jonesy gets a job at the new juice station at the food court: the Lime. It becomes more popular than Caitlin's Lemon, and her boss tells her that, unless Jonesy is run out of business, Caitlin will have to move to a new mall to sell drinks. Wyatt wins VIP tickets for the Mighty Weasels concert, and both Nikki and Jude compete to get them. But in the end, Wyatt gives the tickets to his love interest, Serena.
5	"Deck the Mall"	Jennifer Pertsch	December 5, 2004	106
The gang tries to survive the Christmas shopping rush and ends up locked in the mall. Jonesy is hired as "Santa's little helper", but is later fired for hitting on a mom. The gang then goes to a movie, but they are kicked out for making too much noise.
6	"The Sushi Connection"	Tom McGillis (story); Jennifer Pertsch (story/teleplay)	December 12, 2004	113
Caitlin really likes Kyle Donaldson, a handsome tennis player, so Jen and Jonesy try to help her to get a date with him. Meanwhile, Nikki is teased by The Clones after becoming a temporary assistant manager because her tag says "Ass. Man.", which is short for Assistant Manager.
7	"The Five Finger Discount"	Sean Carley	December 19, 2004	107
While normally the most strict and lawful of the gang, Jen steals an expensive sports jacket to be hip and impress a guy who does not pay much attention to her. Meanwhile, Jude falls for a talking chair named Betty.
8	"Breaking Up with the Boss' Son"	Sean Carley	December 23, 2004	104
Jen falls in love with Coach Halder's son, and then tries to break up with him when she discovers that he is a jerk. Meanwhile, Jonesy works for Darth after destroying an expensive speaker.
9	"Employee of the Month"	Seán Cullen	January 2, 2005	108
In an attempt to make Nikki less individualistic, Chrissy declares her the new "Employee of the Month." Their brainwashing starts to work, and Nikki slowly becomes another Clone. Jonesy is the secret shopper, and Jen tries to get her store reputation back up after being rude to Jonesy.
10	"Idol Time at the Mall"	George Westerholm	January 9, 2005	105
Using a song that describes how great his friends are, Wyatt wins an idol competition taking place in the mall and becomes famous. However, when none of them attend his first gig the following day, he makes a few "changes" to the song that won him the contest. But then the gang gets mad at him for ruining their reputation.
11	"The Fake Date"	George Westerholm	January 16, 2005	109
Jen tries to impress Charlie Dobbs, a new employee at the Penalty Box, by making him jealous. She finds herself a "fake date" to make her plan work, and Jude is the one who must become her boyfriend for a couple of hours. Nikki and Jonesy get stuck in an elevator.
12	"Mr. Nice Guy"	Seán Cullen	February 20, 2005	111
Jonesy tries to cheer up Wyatt by taking him on a double date. The two girls love Wyatt's honesty and maturity and ignore Jonesy's disgusting style. Jonesy becomes jealous and competes with Wyatt. Meanwhile, Jen bets Caitlin that teen magazines are trash and will not help Jude with his problem.
13	"The Girls in the Band"	Tom McGillis	February 27, 2005	110
DawgToy, a boy band, comes to the mall, so Caitlin and Jen try to get close to their idols, but Nikki accidentally wins the competition for a role in DawgToy's video, which makes Jen jealous. Meanwhile, the boys enjoy some needed "guy time," and they bet that Wyatt can't loosen up because he can't fart on command. In addition, Jonesy dresses up as Pokey the Panda after the previous employee is hospitalized (because of Caitlin accidentally knocking into him), but Jonesy, Jude, and Wyatt misuse the mascot costume by doing immoral stunts while wearing the costume (such as kissing a girl and skateboarding down the escalator).
14	"Clonesy"	George Westerholm	March 6, 2005	115
Jonesy takes Nikki out on a date. Jen, Caitlin, and Wyatt try to stop their relationship dead in its tracks out of fear that if it fails, their friendship might be in danger. Meanwhile, Jude uses too much of Jen's muscle-relaxing cream, and his whole body becomes numb, so he's forced to look for help by pushing himself on his skateboard with his mouth.
15	"Stupid Over Cupid"	George Westerholm	March 27, 2005	119
It's Valentine's Day in the mall, and the six best friends try to either find a date or boycott the whole thing; Jonesy offers himself a date to the highest bidder, which, after initially not taking off, results in him becoming the prize in a bidding war between an angry ex, a gay cowboy, and a geek (which results in Nikki saving Jonesy by placing a fake bet of 20,000 dollars). Wyatt makes plans for his date with Serena, but calls them off when he overhears her talking about how she dislikes the unoriginality of traditional Valentine's Day gifts (such as roses and chocolates); he ends up just getting her a CD of her favorite band and inviting her to have a hot dog. Nikki plans out a girls-only Valentine's Day, but Caitlin and Jen are desperate for dates; after their attempts to get dates fail, they decide to stay with Nikki and have a great time.
16	"The Khaki Girl"	Jennifer Pertsch (story/teleplay); Stacey DePass (story)	April 10, 2005	116
Jude meets Starr for the second time, at the water fountain where they both fall in love with each other; Caitlin and her former friend, Tricia, compete against each other at a Khaki Barn contest (where the winner becomes a Khaki Girl). They do a shop-off to see who's best fit to be the Khaki Girl, and when Caitlin is close to winning, Tricia cheats and becomes the Khaki Girl; however, after Tricia throws up on the manager, Caitlin wins by default. Jonesy tries to sell Roast Burky chunklets and ends up causing a disaster at the mall (causing everyone who ate them to get food poisoning, as Jude forgot to plug in the freezer) when he trusts Jude to help him. This leads to Jonsey getting fired for something that wasn't even his fault.
17	"The (Almost) Graduate"	Jennifer Pertsch (story); Seán Cullen (teleplay)	April 17, 2005	121
Wyatt tries to impress the older Serena by making her believe that he is more mature than she thinks. Meanwhile, Caitlin and Jonesy get an interview at Albatross & Finch, and Jonesy surprisingly gets employed due to his arrogance appealing to Albatross & Finch's self-centered employees.
18	"Bring It On"	George Westerholm	April 24, 2005	122
A gender war divides the group when Jonesy works at the Penalty Box and proves to be a better salesman than Jen. Jude becomes the mall's unofficial babysitter, resulting in him biting off more than he can chew and developing a new view on how children's minds really work. The girls end up winning after the boys couldn't handle taking care of the bratty children Jude was babysitting.
19	"The Swami"	Seán Cullen	May 8, 2005	117
Jonesy becomes the manager of a guru. When the guru is unable to come to the mall for his speech, Jonesy gets Jude to take his place. Jude gives people his ridiculous advice, leading to catastrophic events with Wyatt stuck up a ladder when he is afraid of heights.
20	"Cecil B. Delusioned"	George Westerholm	May 15, 2005	123
Jonesy makes his own version of "Prank TV," using a video camera to tape Nikki. Wyatt is failing gym, and Jen helps him.
21	"The Birthday Boy"	Alex Ganetakos (story/teleplay); Tom McGillis (story)	June 1, 2005	118
Wyatt is not very happy about his birthday, as his parents are throwing him a "Trailer Park" themed party. Furthermore, Jonesy still cannot get Nikki out of his head. Caitlin, Jen, and Jude become obsessed with an online life simulator game. After the mall closes at 6:00, they forget about celebrating Wyatt's birthday.
22	"Enter the Dragon"	Alex Ganetakos	June 12, 2005	114
The guys try to get tickets for a new karate movie, but the girls are acting strange (Caitlin is acting very defensive and upset, Jen has cramps, and Nikki is acting nicer than usual as well as eating chocolate, which she normally hates) because they're having their periods. The guys do not know this and freak out because the girls supposedly have the only tickets left. But then they figure out that Jude had them the whole time. In addition, Jonesy tries to work at the sushi restaurant, but has trouble understanding the owner's teachings as well as annoying the staff.
23	"One Quiet Day"	Jennifer Pertsch	June 12, 2005	120
After Jonesy claims that Jen cannot go an evening without telling others what to do, he turns the claim into a bet with the whole gang staking some money. Jen must not be pushy, bossy, or tell anyone what to do until the end of the day, which turns out to be hard after the gang tries their best to make Jen crack. But after Nikki and Wyatt attempt to get tattoos, Jen finally bursts out. Meanwhile, Jude does not want to study for his exams, and his friends make him do it by any means necessary.
24	"It's Always Courtney, Courtney, Courtney!"	Jennifer Pertsch	June 19, 2005	126
Jen's big sister is back from college (where she flunked out after her second year), and Jen is horrified when she starts hanging out with her gang. As usual, Jen has landed smack-dab in the middle of her sister's shadow — Courtney is prettier, sexier, more stylish, funnier, and better-traveled. She's also kind of a shallow witch and is dismissive as ever of Jen, but none of the gang seems to notice. Every guy in sixth grade had a crush on her. Jen's used to guys falling all over her sister, but she's dismayed to see that Nikki and Caitlin can't get enough of her. Desperate to get her attention back, Jen tries to have fun at a dance party, but the top of her backless dress comes off, exposing her breasts. When Courtney leaves the gang all hanging in the wind, they realize that they already had the affection of the cooler sister who could bail them out: Jen. Meanwhile, Jonesy dates Lydia, a girl who is nuts for him. Nikki and Jonesy share their first kiss. Note: The title is a reference to The Brady Bunch episode "Marcia, Marcia, Marcia" where Jan is jealous of her older sister, Marcia.
25	"The One with the Text Message"	Jennifer Pertsch	June 19, 2005	125
Serena breaks up with Wyatt via text message, and the gang tries to help Wyatt get over it.
26	"Boo, Dude!"	Jennifer Pertsch	June 19, 2005	124
Jonesy, Wyatt, and Jude try to prank Ron by closing down all the bathrooms and photographing him with his pants down, but end up pranking Caitlin. Meanwhile, Jen wants to stop Coach Halder's Jason Voorhees-style jokes at the Penalty Box.
27	"Dude of the Living Dead"	Tom McGillis; Jennifer Pertsch	June 22, 2005	999
The whole mall becomes infested with zombies. Jen has a giant zit on her forehead, and only the gang, Ron, The Clones, and Darth are left. The Clones go first because of their stupidity. Ron and Darth both act surprisingly more heroically than usual, and both sacrifice themselves to save the rest of the gang while fighting off many zombies. They find out that Starr is alive too, and Jude comes up with a plan to kill the Zombies. It works for a while, but fails later. The group gets bitten, Jude and Starr are left, they kiss, and then Zombie Jen pops her zit, causing Jude to puke in Starr's mouth again. Jude wakes up and finds that he was dreaming after having fallen asleep while watching a 24-hour monster movie marathon. But when he goes to the mall that morning, he sees that Jen has a zit on her forehead and screams in horror. Note: "Dude of the Living Dead" was an hour-long episode and co-directed by Gary Hurst.

=== Season 2 (2005–06) ===
No.	Title	Written by	Original release date	Prod. code
28	"Going Underground"	Jennifer Pertsch	November 2, 2005	201
Jude is fired from Stick-It (which also gets shut down in the process permanently) after a customer complains about finding a cockroach in his food and the fact Jude did not clean up the kiosk, and Wyatt is fired from Spin This for getting on Serena's nerves. After this happens, they attempt to apply at Taj Mahome Video, but the managers kick them both out without even looking at their resumes. Both find themselves at Underground Video, working for the cynical so-called movie expert Wayne. Meanwhile, Caitlin is afraid her boyfriend, Tallen, will break up with her for constantly injuring him, until she finds out he's a terrible kisser. Goof: At the end of the episode, Caitlin's cake switches between chocolate cake with pink icing to pink cake with chocolate icing.
29	"Deadbeat Poets Society"	Jennifer Pertsch	November 9, 2005	202
Starr wants to help Wyatt control his anger, and introduces him to a small poet society. All goes well until his friends find out, go to one of his readings to support him and Caitlin farts during one of his poems, causing the whole gang to laugh and embarrass Wyatt (the title is a reference to the movie Dead Poets Society starring Robin Williams).
30	"Career Day"	Hugh Duffy	November 16, 2005	203
Caitlin's career test is accidentally switched with Nikki's, which causes The Clones to be nice to Nikki because they think that she is destined to be a retail specialist. Meanwhile, Jude destroys a copy of Wayne's beloved film and is afraid that Wayne will fire him. In addition, Jonesy is working as the mall PA, but gets fired for misusing the microphone and leading Ron on several wild goose chases that Jonesy made up or caused.
31	"Fish and Make Up"	Alice Prodanou	November 23, 2005	204
Jude finds himself a new goldfish friend named "Fish." Meanwhile, Nikki snaps at Caitlin, after Caitlin keeps telling stories to her friends about her new crush, Wade, which leads to Caitlin and Nikki being no longer friends. After the gang is forced to take sides, they try to get Nikki and Caitlin back together but fail until Fish's funeral brings them together.
32	"Awake the Wyatt Within"	George Westerholm	November 30, 2005	205
Wyatt tries to get Serena back, and finds out that Wayne might be his only hope because of his ability to choose the perfect movies for broken couples. Meanwhile, Jen wants to end her relationship with Charlie Dobbs, but the gang loves him and persuades Jen to keep her relationship with Charlie, much to her dismay. Also, Jonesy has an argument with Nikki over her style, and Caitlin's blender is broken, which stands in the way for the bonus that she wants.
33	"Unhappy Anniversary"	Jennifer Pertsch	December 7, 2005	206
Jonesy and Nikki have been together for three months. The two try to find gifts for each other, which leads to a big misunderstanding. Jude crashes at Wyatt's place because his aunt is in town. Meanwhile, Caitlin has a date with Zane, but has to deal with Tricia, who plans to ruin her life in revenge for dating her ex.
34	"Pillow Talk"	Seán Cullen	December 14, 2005	207
The gang exchange embarrassing stories, promising to keep them secret. Caitlin tells her boyfriend who divulges all the stories to the public while being hypnotized. Jonesy takes advantage of his new job screening applicants for a dating service. Note: During an April 1, 2010 rerun, they played farts and burps in the show.
35	"In a Retail Wonderland"	George Westerholm	December 18, 2005	211
Starr wants to help Jen during the Christmas rush by calming her down, so she teaches Jen yoga. Also, Nikki does not want to go to Acapulco with her parents. Wayne falls asleep on the job, so he dreams he's visited by three ghosts that teach him about the true meaning of Christmas. Meanwhile, Caitlin loses the will to shop. Note: The title is a reference to the classic holiday song Winter Wonderland.
36	"Midnight Madness"	Hugh Duffy	December 26, 2005	212
The gang convinces Jen to throw a small get-together for New Year's Eve at her house, and everyone is excited, including Nikki who's coming back from Acapulco with her parents. However, Jonesy tries to turn the party into a "chick fest." Meanwhile, Wyatt takes advantage of Serena and Chad's relationship problems to make up with Serena.
37	"Welcome to the Darth Side"	Alice Prodanou	December 27, 2005	209
Nikki is temporarily fired from the Khaki Barn because of Jonesy, and forced to work with Darth and Caitlin helps her to set Darth up with Julie. Meanwhile, Jen and Jonesy try to compete in salesmanship to win sporting equipment and Jen makes a deal with Officer Ron so she can sell most of her products. Also, Jude sets Wyatt up with Lydia, but she thinks that Wayne is Wyatt (this title is a reference to Welcome to the Dark Side).
38	"The New Guy"	Seán Cullen; Jennifer Pertsch	December 28, 2005	210
Ron the Rent-a-cop hires an assistant security guard, Kai (Drew Nelson), who is way more fun than Ron. But after the gang gets Ron to quit, they find out that the assistant security guard is nothing but an inexperienced rookie. When Caitlin sees how sad Ron is without his job, she gets him to hang out with them. But after finding out what a downer Ron is, the others don't want to hang out with him and make another plan to get Ron's job back.
39	"Major Unfaithfulness"	Jennifer Pertsch	December 29, 2005	214
Caitlin cheats on her hairdresser for a famous stylist, but her boyfriend thinks that she's cheating on him instead after hearing something from Jude. Meanwhile, Underground Videos is sold to Taj Mahome Video, so Wayne, Jude, and Wyatt find a way to buy it back.
40	"Waiting to Ex-Sale"	Jennifer Pertsch	December 29, 2005	215
Jonesy is scared to donate blood because of a childhood experience of getting hit in the nose with a soccer ball, unlike Jude who is obsessed with donating blood because he wants the free donuts the nurse gives away to the people who donate. Meanwhile, Caitlin and Jen wait in line for a once-in-a-lifetime sale at Albatross & Finch, but the line to get in is extremely long (the episode title is a reference to the 1995 romance movie Waiting to Exhale).
41	"Losing Your Lemon"	Hugh Duffy	January 8, 2006	208
Caitlin has paid up the credit debt she accrued a long time ago and is free to go, so she quits her job. Meanwhile, doppelgängers of the gang show up in the mall because of the snobbish Tricia, Caitlin's ex-best friend, and Jude plays with the fish at the sushi restaurant with Starr. Note: Smithy is seen in this episode as Tricia's friend and doppelganger of Jonesy and is seen again as Jen's boyfriend in episode 60 "The New Jonesy".
42	"The Hunted"	Nicole Demerse	January 15, 2006	216
Nikki falls for the new salesman at Albatross & Finch named Hunter, so Nikki asks Caitlin to ask him out for her but Caitlin ends up dating him instead. Meanwhile, Jude and Wyatt start a psychic hotline because the real phone number is only a digit off Underground Video's number.
43	"Lights Out"	Tom McGillis	January 22, 2006	217
Starr goes goth, and Jude goes goth as well to impress her. Meanwhile, the rest of the gang visits the movie theatre during a power outage at the mall.
44	"A Ding from Down Under"	Terry McGurrin	January 29, 2006	218
Jude starts a long-distance relationship with a girl from Australia, who eventually is revealed to already have a local boyfriend. Meanwhile, Wyatt gets fired from Underground Video because of ruining a sacred video, and starts to work at "Burger McFlipsters." Surprisingly, he does well and is promoted to assistant manager by his boss, Tim, as Wyatt's singing has earned the restaurant more profits than usual. Jonesy applies there due to Wyatt drawing in many female customers, but his singing is horrible. This causes Jonesy to quit rather than getting fired. Jen also is a target in Coach Halder and his son Cory's paintball training. After she gets hit constantly, she counterattacks them (Alan Park guest stars as Tim).
45	"The Wedding Destroyers"	Jennifer Pertsch	February 5, 2006	219
As the wedding between Jonesy's Dad and Jen's Mom approaches, it's all too clear that the amalgamation of the two families is not going to be smooth sailing. The feud starts when Jonesy sees Jen topless. When "Grind Me" gets double booked for their Mom's wedding shower and Jonesy's Dad's Stag, everything breaks loose. The parents are finally forced to make a decision to postpone their wedding until the children are grown and out of the house. The kids and parents want to work things out. Meanwhile, The Clones accuse Nikki of stealing merchandise, and desperately call in Ron the Rent-a-cop to prove it (the episode title is a reference to the 2005 comedy film Wedding Crashers).
46	"The Lords of Malltown"	Tom McGillis	February 12, 2006	213
Jude teaches Wyatt to loosen up by coaching him to skateboard like a pro, while Caitlin makes Jen go out with her on an unwanted double-date. Jonesy also works as a janitor in disguise only to be fired for hiding trash throughout the mall and not properly cleaning up the place (the episode title is a reference to the 2005 skateboarding film Lords of Dogtown).
47	"Jonesy's Low Mojo"	Tom McGillis	February 19, 2006	220
Jonesy is beaten by a twelve-year-old at an arcade game and tries desperately to take his title back at all costs, even if it means cheating. Meanwhile, Nikki falls for a new guy named Stone.
48	"Smarten Up"	Carolyn Hay	February 26, 2006	221
Caitlin lies about being in college to win the heart of a cute college boy, while Jude attempts to win a "Roll Up the Rim to Win"-style contest at Grind Me only to get a caffeine addiction.
49	"Dirty Work"	Nicole Demerse	March 5, 2006	222
Jonesy starts his own business, a "breaking bad news service" that delivers all types of bad news to people on behalf of someone else, which he makes a lot of money on, and "catches girls on the rebound," too. Everything is fine, until Wayne gets furious at Jonesy for taking away his fries under his mom's orders, so Wayne starts man-hunting Jonesy around the mall. Also, to make matters worse, Jonesy is hired by Nikki's boyfriend to break up with her on his behalf. Meanwhile, bullying girls at the escalator hold Jen's house keys and Jude's old skateboard hostage.
50	"Over Exposed"	Alex Ganetakos	April 6, 2006	225
Jonesy accidentally sees Jen fully naked when her towel falls off during an argument. They both swear secrecy, but end up telling the rest of the gang while Jonesy struggles to get the image out of his head. Meanwhile, Chrissy starts working at the Soft Rock Café (a parody of the Hard Rock Café), and Kristen and Kirsten begin looking up to Nikki instead. Jude also gets addicted to Burger McFlippster's Ragin’ Cajun fries. At the end, Nikki helps out Jen to feel comfortable again by showing the entire Soft Rock Café a picture of Jonsey naked.
51	"A Crime of Fashion"	Alice Prodanou	April 13, 2006	223
Tricia frames Caitlin for stealing clothes from Albatross & Finch. Meanwhile, Jude sees a mannequin in a display window, which looks just like him wearing formal wear but soon finds out that another store uses his image for a mannequin in a thong. Plus, Jonesy tries to get a date with a beautiful French exchange student working at an ice cream shop. But after Jen's older sister, Courtney, drops off his brother, he embarrasses him in front of her.
52	"Spring Fling"	Carolyn Hay	April 20, 2006	224
The girls try to make Nikki a Spring Queen, but Tricia stands in the way, and seduces Jonesy to help her in the campaign against Nikki. When Nikki finds out about this, she feels betrayed and hits Jonesy with a chair.
53	"Girlie Boys"	Alice Prodanou	April 27, 2006	226
Jonesy gets a job in the mall's spa. Meanwhile, Jude tries to compete against his rival Mike Dent in a skateboarding race. Wyatt encourages this because Mike used to take his cookies in kindergarten. He starts to practice by pulling Caitlin around on his skateboard, but when he finds out he's getting slower, he goes to great lengths (such as shaving all his hair off) to go faster. Little does he know that the only reason he's getting slower is because Caitlin is gaining weight at her part-time job, where she eats nothing but free chocolate (6 pounds of it a day).
54	"Snow Job"	Jennifer Pertsch	December 21, 2006	998
The biggest snowstorm of the year means that it's "snow day," and with only 3 days before the biggest dance of the year, the gang use the time to work out important issues at the mall. Jonesy wants to ask Nikki to the dance, but instead goes with the "Hottest Girl" in school, Wyatt and Caitlin want to "score" their "dream dates," but are worried they might humiliate themselves trying, and Jude is worried about the fact that Ron the "Rent-a-cop" bans him from the mall and that he might be banned forever. Note: This was an hour-long episode.

=== Season 3 (2007–08) ===
No.	Title	Written by	Original release date	Prod. code
55	"Sweet 6teen"	Terry McGurrin	September 5, 2007	301
Caitlin's 16th birthday is coming up and she wants to have the most "awesome expensive party ever." But when Tricia hears Caitlin's going to have Chill TV there to film the party for its reality show Sweet 16, she persuades Caitlin to have a joint Sweet 16 with her. Meanwhile, Jude lowers the mall temperature to make the ice in the ice rink have a better sliding effect.
56	"Baby, You Stink"	Dave Dias	September 13, 2007	302
Jonesy, Wyatt, and Jude agree not to shower or clean themselves for a week to determine which one of them smells the worst and the best, with Nikki, Jen, and Caitlin as the judges. Meanwhile, Caitlin persuades her new boyfriend to try to get a good baby picture in a brand new "Make A Baby" booth that's just been added to the mall, but every picture she takes with him ends up ugly. When Jen goes in with Jude, their baby is perfect (so are all the other couples, like Wyatt and Marlowe and Darth and Julie), which makes Caitlin break up with her boyfriend and look around the mall for cute boys she can go in with to have a perfect baby.
57	"Selling Out to the Burger Man"	Katherine Gougeon	September 17, 2007	303
Caitlin "falls in love" with Les Bland, who buys her many new clothes. Meanwhile, Wyatt writes down a new jingle in order to be rewarded with free food and rehearsal space for a band at Burger McFlipsters.
58	"The Journal"	Alex Ganetakos	October 7, 2007	305
Jonesy gets a new job at the mall's Lost & Found, and comes along Jen's precious journal and gives it to Caitlin, but she, Nikki, and Wyatt end up reading it and learns Jen's thoughts about them. Soon, the gang feels guilty after the whole mall knows all Jen's deepest secrets. Jen freaks out, hides in her room, and threatens to never talk to her so-called friends again. Meanwhile, Jonesy starts selling the lost and found items to people in the mall.
59	"Silent Butt Deadly"	Terry McGurrin	October 14, 2007	306
Nikki and Jonesy spend some quality time at Jonesy's house, until Nikki needs to use the bathroom next door to Jonesy's bedroom, and a faulty flusher causes a flood. Meanwhile, Jude starts secretly dating a senior named Melinda Wilson.
60	"The New Jonesy"	Anita Kapila	October 15, 2007	307
Jen starts dating a guy named Smithy (last seen in the season 2 episode "Losing Your Lemon"). The gang realizes that Smithy acts and looks just like Jonesy, but Jen doesn't believe them until she gets a closer look at Smithy. Meanwhile, Jude races his Zamboni against Ron the Rent-a-cop to see which vehicle will stay at the mall. And later on, Jonesy wears a wig that looks like Smithy's hair and then Jen accidentally kisses Jonesy for looking like Smithy.
61	"Wrestlemania"	Hugh Duffy	November 4, 2007	304
Jen gets promoted to Assistant Coach at The Penalty Box, only to order too much wrestling merchandise from a marketing representative when she develops a crush on him. Jen needs to sell the wrestling gear while her job is still on the line, so Jonesy, in his wrestling name "The Stud," lends a hand along with Jude and Wyatt as color commentators. Meanwhile, Nikki's ex-boyfriend Stone returns to the mall so Nikki tries to get over him, with Caitlin's help.
62	"Prank'd"	Dave Dias	November 6, 2007	308
Jonesy keeps pranking Jen, much to her dismay, so Jen tries to get revenge on Jonesy by fighting fire with fire and pranking him badly. Meanwhile, Caitlin also apparently wins a contest from the bank that gives her money to spend. She then spends it on some diamond and earrings that makes Tricia believe that Caitlin working in the lemon is fake, which causes Tricia to stalk Caitlin.
63	"2–4–1"	Alex Ganetakos	November 12, 2007	309
Caitlin falls in love with two different guys named Vince and Blake at the same time while in the change room wearing a dress. Both guys only notice Caitlin and not Jen due to Jen's hideous poodle sweatshirt and her drooling over both of them, along with Caitlin fluttering her eyelashes at both boys. Jen's jealous throughout the whole episode. Meanwhile, an old bickering couple get a new job at Burger Mcflipsters with Wyatt.
64	"Another Day at the Office"	Geoffrey Pertsch; Jennifer Pertsch	November 25, 2007	314
Jonesy opens an account at the bank, but he later impersonates the bank's manager from the head office, giving out loans to his friends and rejecting loans from others. Meanwhile, Nikki seeks revenge by playing a huge prank on the Khaki Clones. In addition, Jen tries to sell some of her old sports equipment to pay for her snowboarding trip to Whistler to no avail.
65	"Oops, I Dialed It Again"	Terry McGurrin	November 28, 2007	310
Nikki starts admiring and complimenting with the customers at the Khaki Barn so she can earn more money to buy Jonesy new skates, but when she accidentally calls Jonesy on one of the new cell phones Caitlin gave all of them, he overhears her flirting with one of the customers and thinks she's cheating on him. Meanwhile, Jen gets stuck in a question booth, and Wyatt lets the gang endlessly prank him so he can finish his new album.
66	"How the Rent-A-Cop Stole Christmas"	Jennifer Pertsch	December 20, 2007	322
Ron the Rent-a-Cop seems determined to put an end to Christmas by confiscating all of the Mall decorations and otherwise getting out of control and abusing his power as the head of mall security. Meanwhile, Nikki's mom, Mrs. Wong, doesn't think Jonesy is right for Nikki so she attempts to interfere in her daughter's relationship with Jonesy by setting her up with other boys in the mall.
67	"Insert Name Here"	Nicole Demerse	January 7, 2008	313
Wyatt accidentally calls his girlfriend, Marlowe, "Serena," the name of his ex-girlfriend, several times. Meanwhile, Jude falls in love with French Canadian figure skater Claudette, who only speaks French. All while Jonesy charges couples money to make out in an old sports car.
68	"All Pets Are Off"	Alex Nussbaum	January 31, 2008	315
Caitlin falls for a guy who loves animals, so after seeing Tricia with a cute new pet, Caitlin decides to have one for herself to impress him. Meanwhile, Jude's lucky coin falls into the air vent and he gets stuck while trying to retrieve it.
69	"J Is For Genius"	Nicole Demerse	February 3, 2008	318
Jonesy challenges Nikki to an IQ face off by taking IQ tests, so Jonesy pays Wayne to switch his test with a copy of his, leading Jonesy to have a 99% score and be hired as a computer technician in the computer store "Things That Beep." Meanwhile, Jen gets along with the intern coach of The Penalty Box when Coach Halder takes a short leave of absence. Later, Jude and Ron get hooked on a romantic soap opera.
70	"Bicker Me Not"	Alex Ganetakos	February 10, 2008	319
Jonesy accidentally breaks up George and Gracie Bickerson's marriage and Nikki won't speak to Jonesy until he gets them back together. Caitlin sends letters to Kevin, the other Lemon employee who works in the mornings. By the end of the episode, Caitlin meets Kevin and learns he is gay.
71	"Love At Worst Sight"	Alex Nussbaum	February 17, 2008	320
Marlowe gets excited after getting a job at "Spin This," which upsets Wyatt, since he used to work there before Serena fired him for taking her rejection too seriously. Meanwhile, Jonesy scams people into buying glasses for his new job as an assistant optometrist by replacing the normal eye chart with a blurry eye chart to earn more commission.
72	"The One with the Cold Sore"	Terry McGurrin	February 24, 2008	316
While Caitlin tries to deal with her aching cold sore, a teen movie gets filmed at the Mall, and auditions for movie extras are held at "Grind Me." Jonesy wants to be discovered, but the director decides to pick Jen, who later gets a supporting role in the film, after one of the actresses decides to drop out. Meanwhile, Wyatt and Nikki suspect that Caitlin and Jude have started dating.
73	"Double Date"	Patrick Crowe	March 2, 2008	311
Jonesy and Nikki win a pair of tickets to one of Jonesy's favorite sci-fi flicks, War Star Galaxy Force (which parodies the Star Wars saga), but the other pair of tickets are awarded to Darth and Julie, meaning they all have to be together. During the filming, Jonesy and Darth work on a plan to film the movie in order to sell unlicensed DVDs. Meanwhile, some of the girls in the mall, led by Tricia, want to get back at their boyfriends for doing rude, dumb and mean things around or to them, until Caitlin and Jen discover that Tricia's feminist kick is really a scam to try to turn Caitlin and her friends against each other.
74	"Fashion Victims"	Alice Prodanou	March 10, 2008	312
Jen is putting some old clothes up for the mall clothing donation drive, but Jonesy sees that the donated clothes were from his father and uses the donated wardrobe for himself in an attempt to act cool. He is discovered by a mysterious man who claims he is the latest teen-trend finder, and offers Jonesy a job. Jonesy gladly accepts and attempts to find hot new trends.
75	"Whoa, Baby!"	Alice Prodanou	March 11, 2008	317
Caitlin falls for a guy named Sawyer, but she feels the needs to make her breasts bigger since Sawyer is into large-chested girls. Caitlin then buys a water bra, which gives Jonesy the idea to sell bras with water balloons stuffed in them. Meanwhile, Diego and Robbie drive Jen completely nuts since Jen hates her three stepbrothers, but finds out her mom is pregnant and is desperate to find out if it is a girl or a boy.
76	"Cheapskates"	Nicole Demerse	March 12, 2008	321
Griffin, a new employee at The Penalty Box, asks Jen out on a date, only later to find out that he's more of a miser than a hunky guy. Meanwhile, Caitlin dates a boy named Jasper, and each mistakenly thinks the other speaks fluent Spanish.
77	"Opposites Attack"	Sean Carley	March 13, 2008	323
Jonesy gets a job as a customer service rep at a travel agency and has much in common with his co-worker Joanie, and they start to spend a little bit too much time with each other. Nikki notices this and starts to fear that Jonesy might dump her for Joanie. Meanwhile, Jude gets a job at the Penalty Box.
78	"Mr. and Mr. Perfect"	Alex Ganetakos	March 14, 2008	324
A dating dispute ensues when Jen needs a date for her cousin's wedding to avoid being seated at the lame children's table. Nikki and Jonesy find a perfect candidate named Dax who is an old friend of Nikki's, but Caitlin feels that the guy that she found, Dougray, is even more perfect. Meanwhile, Ron puts Wyatt in mall jail on a trumped-up charge of littering and blackmails him into teaching Ron how to play the guitar to play a song for his crush (Yummy Mummy). Jude also throws a beach vacation in the mall.
79	"Date and Switch"	Robin J. Stein; Alice Prodanou	April 20, 2008	325
Wyatt has a fear that Marlowe could break up with him after they've gotten on each other's nerves for a while. Caitlin meets a cute boy named Calum at a party and later realizes he's a nerd so she writes him a fake phone number, but she writes the number on the back of her very own Khaki Card, on which she saved shopper's card points since she was 14 years old. So Caitlin needs to find a way to search for Calum and get her Khaki card back.
80	"Life Slaver"	Alice Prodanou; Terry McGurrin	April 25, 2008	326
Caitlin saves Darth from a bully, who had strung him up over a mezzanine railing, and gets protection from the Jedi force as her reward, but Darth's girlfriend Julie is jealous that Darth is spending so much time around Caitlin, and wants revenge. Meanwhile, Jonesy and Jude find a box of old security tapes from over 30 years ago, which featured a younger version of Ron the Rent-a-cop. Later, Jen gets bad luck after deleting a chain e-mail that says she must forward it to 100 addresses, or get bad luck forever.

=== Season 4 (2009–10) ===
No.	Title	Written by	Original release date	Prod. code
81	"Labour Day Part A"	Terry McGurrin	September 10, 2009	401
Jen's mother, Emma will be soon going into labor at the hospital while Jonesy and Jude start wheelchair races in the hospital corridors. Caitlin is forced to use a pay phone, which she has a fear of using, rather than her cell phone which she is forbidden to use in the hospital. Meanwhile, Nikki is too afraid of babies to help Jen's mother with the breathing exercises. Jen tries to be excused from work to go see her mother at the hospital, but she ends up getting stuck in many places, from having her shoelace stuck in the escalator to getting put in the slammer at Ron the Rent-a-cop's office, and when Nathan, a new boy Jen likes, helps to free her, they both end up stuck inside one of the mall's elevators.
82	"Labour Day Part B"	Terry McGurrin	September 17, 2009	402
Jen and Nathan are still stuck in the elevator at the mall, Jude chats up with a dead body, and Jonesy becomes a clown to entertain the kids at the hospital, while Nikki is in love with newborn babies in the hospital's nursery, but she accidentally puts two babies in the wrong cribs. But she then puts them back. She then goes to Jonesy for advice on how to switch the babies back, eventually leading into Nikki telling Jonesy that she loves him. She then disguises herself as a nurse in an attempt to switch the babies back and prevent a couple from mistakenly taking the wrong baby home. In the end, Jude takes a picture of everyone gathered around the new baby, Emma.
83	"6 Teens and a Baby"	Alex Nussbaum	September 24, 2009	403
Jen's mom asks Jen if she can take care of baby Emma, until Coach Halder calls Jen to report to work at the Penalty Box. Jen then assigns Jonesy to take care of baby Emma on her behalf while she works. Jonesy gets bored at home, so he takes Emma to the mall, but baby Emma kept crying so he gives her to Nikki to look after. Nikki, meanwhile, experiences weird dreams about being in a relationship with Darth, so she passes the baby to Caitlin. Baby Emma then vomits all over Caitlin, who then gives her to Wyatt at Burger McFlipster's. Needing to get away from his new co-worker Wayne, Wyatt leaves with the baby and heads to the ice rink to give her to Jonesy, but Jude puts her on the Zamboni, which then drives off into the mall after Jude accidentally disengages the parking brake. Ron the Rent-a-cop gets baby Emma and gives her back to Jen, who then finds out her parents are getting home and she has to rush home with her baby sister before they arrive. Meanwhile, Wayne is hired to work at Burger McFlipster's after he announces that Underground Video is shut down. This is a title reference to the movie Three Men and a Baby.
84	"Blast from the Past"	Charles Johnston	October 1, 2009	404
Olympic athlete Travis Gibson visits the mall to meet Jen, but Jen won't spend time with him because of the time Travis threw a rock right at her forehead back in grade 2 and gave her a nasty scar. Caitlin decides to give up boys for good and go into art after her new flame Spencer dumps her. Jonesy can't seem to remember where he got hired for a new job. Jude, who is now unemployed after getting fired from the ice rink, looks to find ways to make some money, including fishing coins out of the mall fountain and making a bet with an elderly man at a classic game shop. A picture of Camp Wawanakawa from Total Drama Island can be seen at the art show. In the end, Jen ends up dating Travis.
85	"Quit It!"	Duana Taha	October 8, 2009	405
Nikki quits her job at the Khaki Barn and gets a new job at a cooking store. But she soon finds out that cooking isn't in her blood, due to the fact that she made pumpkin muffins and accidentally put laxatives in them causing her to get fired and get her old job back. Meanwhile, Wyatt starts dating Lacey, a girl who has way too much in common with him and it starts to creep Wyatt out. Also, Jude gets a copy of the game "Rock Maniac" (a direct parody of the real-life Rock Band and Guitar Hero game series) in his store and the gang start their own "Battle of the Rock Maniac Bands" contest.
86	"Kylie Smylie"	Laurie Elliott	October 15, 2009	406
Teen singer Kylie Smylie visits the mall to sign some autographs for her fans and perform a concert as well. Caitlin, who wrote a contest essay to get a chance to meet Kylie, is declared the winner. Serena broke up with Chad and wants to have another shot at a relationship with Wyatt, but he refuses and instead accepts Kylie (leaving Serena saddened in the process), as she has interest in him. Unfortunately, Kylie's father/manager, an ex-pro wrestler called Sgt. Beef, won't let Kylie date until she's at least 21. Jonesy scores a job as Kylie's bodyguard and Jen tries everything she can just to see her. Nikki and Jude have problems with the Escalator Girls and need to find a way to get back at them.
87	"The List"	Terry McGurrin	November 12, 2009	407
Jude finds out that he has a lucky zit, while Wyatt becomes depressed because he can't manage to get a girlfriend after his last date disaster. Jonesy gives him "The List," which is a list of girls he had previously dated and short details about them, which leads to Nikki and him having a fight about how long have they dated and Nikki declaring that they are going to have a break from each other until Jonesy can figure out why and how he's dating her. Near the end, Jonesy finally declares Nikki as "The One," mostly what Caitlin calls every boy that she dates. Meanwhile at Albatross & Finch, Caitlin notices she had lost her credit card and she sets out to find it, with help from Jen, by tracing purchases made on the card after its disappearance.
88	"Great Expectations"	Charles Johnston	November 19, 2009	408
After Jonesy gets a job in a mini golf course, he starts charging couples to make out in the pitch black UFO, which ends up with Caitlin and Wyatt accidentally kissing when each thinks the other to be their respective dream dates. Meanwhile, Jude's 10-year-old cousin, Jade, comes to the mall. She is crushing on Jonesy, buying him presents (new shoes, sunglasses) which makes Nikki convinced that she is shoplifting, but while trying to catch Jade in the act, Ron catches Nikki and, convinced (as usual) that Nikki is up to no good while overlooking the real culprit in Jade, throws Nikki in the mall security lockup. When Jonesy comes to bail her out, Jade convinces him to accept her as his new girlfriend in exchange for getting the keys from her. Meanwhile, Travis Gibson comes back to the Galleria to Jen's delight, but he makes Jen feel like he is not paying any attention to her, so Jen gets paranoid as usual and spies on him, also Travis ends up breaking up with Jen because his Olympic training leaves him with no time for a relationship.
89	"Out of this World"	Laura Morris	February 11, 2010	409
Caitlin tries to find a way to fix the blender after one of her giant earrings dropped into it, but both she and Jen develop crushes on the repairman who comes to fix the blender. The girls turn it into a competition to see who can get a date with him first, and with Nikki as the referee, Jen secretly gets her to spy on Caitlin to see if she tries resorting to her usual tricks (like eyelash-fluttering) to get the repairman. However the repair man turns out not to be so handy and they resort to not dating him. The girls fix the blender just in time and Caitlin does not get fired. Jonesy, Jude and Wyatt wait in a long line for a blockbuster alien movie, but they keep getting out of line and losing their spots, until they make a deal with Wayne to keep their spots in the lineup – but then, Wayne goes back on his word and causes the guys to all lose their spots again through various dirty tricks. When Nikki stops by, Jude asks her to empty what appears to be a jalapeño pepper jar, but Nikki finds out what is in the jar (Jude's own urine, because he needed to relieve himself without losing his spot in the ticket lineup) and throws it up in the air, where it lands on Ron the Rent-a-cop. Once again, Ron uses the incident as an excuse to harass the gang by throwing them in the mall security lockup until Jonsey bails them out by giving Ron his, Jude's and Wyatt's tickets for the movie.
90	"On Your Mark, Get Set... Date!"	Alex Nussbaum	February 11, 2010	410
Wyatt, Caitlin, Jen, and Jude are loveless at the time so they get mad when they see Jonesy and Nikki flirting with each other right in front of them. Nikki suggested sarcastically to join a speed dating session, and Jonesy decided he wanted to host it because he got kicked from his last job, and needed money. So, Nikki and Jonesy start a speed dating service for Jen, Caitlin, Jude and Wyatt to help find their special someones. Jen received a new method of being mean and unattainable for getting guys from Jonesy while Nicki seconded Caitlin's idea to be nice and respectful to the guys. Therefore, they made it a competition; Caitlin used her nice and sweet act and Jen used her too-good-for-you methods on the double date they had to go to with the two Asian twins they chose. Both of them are nervous, and Jonesy and Nikki at once interfered with the foursome because of arguing. What made it worse was that Caitlin kissed the wrong boy! Jen purposely kissed the other boy as payback, and the four switched couples, and it was for the best because they liked each other more. Meanwhile, Jude sees Starr again, but he has to take an IQ test to see if he's smart enough to hang out with her because Starr had decided to change her image into a nerd. At first, he freaked out and made Wayne do his IQ Test, which he procrastinated on and got a score 62. When Jude actually does it himself, it turned out he was a genius, which was obviously a stroke a luck. Meanwhile, Wyatt meets a new barista from Grind Me at the dating session, but they both eventually find out that their relationship is centered around coffee, the only thing they have in common, which is typical for Wyatt.
91	"Role Reversal"	Terry McGurrin	February 11, 2010	411
A Sadie Hawkins dance comes to the mall where the girls ask the guys out. While Jude and Wyatt struggle to get chosen, Caitlin and Jen try to overcome the pressure of asking the guys. Nikki becomes friends with a new Khaki Barn employee Jean, but spends so much time with her, she forgets to ask Jonesy to the dance, and Caitlin needs to find a way out of date with Wayne after he mistakenly thinks she asked him out.
92	"Bye Bye Nikki? Part A"	Nicole Demerse	February 11, 2010	412
Nikki's father is accepted for a job up in Iqaluit, and Nikki doesn't want to go, so Jonesy gets Caitlin to tell Mr. Wong that his interview was moved to Grind Me at the mall, and Jonesy pretends to be Mr. Wong at the real interview, when he tries to do everything he can to make him not get the job. It doesn't work, however, because he gets the job anyway. So Nikki has to convince her parents to let her stay but she has to find a place to stay first. Jen's mom said she could stay with them for a semester but Nikki's parents don't want her living under the same roof as her boyfriend, so Nikki and Jonesy pretend to break up so she can stay with them. But Nikki finds out that living with Jen is too hard. Meanwhile, Jude loses his house keys while his parents are away so he temporarily lives in the mall, where he is repeatedly hounded by Ron the Rent-a-cop.
93	"Bye Bye Nikki? Part B"	Alice Prodanou	February 11, 2010	413
When Nikki's friends do a going-away party at Grind Me for her, Nikki's parents said they would stay as her father would keep his old job, but Nikki objects and admits that it should be time for her to "grow up" and that she should finally make some self-sacrifice after everything that her parents have done for her. So she agrees to move up North to Iqaluit so her father can get the job. Upon departing, Nikki attempts to call Jonesy on the cell phone just to tell him that she doesn't want to break up with him, and Jonesy wishes the same. The gang says good bye to Nikki and tell her they'll talk to her soon, as she bids them one final farewell. It finishes with Jonesy saying "Maybe everything will be okay after all..." The episode, and the series ends, with the camera zooming out to a wide shot of the mall food court as all the supporting characters in the show are seen walking through.

=== Special episode (2018) ===
On May 16, 2018, Jen's voice actor, Megan Fahlenbock, tweeted "One time 6teen reunion episode is coming ... stay tooned! #6teenforever." Christian Potenza, Jude's voice actor, later announced that a 6teen special reunion episode was in the works. Tom McGillis, president of Fresh TV and one of the creators and executive producers of 6teen also confirmed the special episode, tweeting "6teen reunion episode coming soon. They've aged! #8teen". Serving as a public-service announcement regarding the 2018 US midterm elections, the webisode was released on YouTube on September 12, 2018, with the original voice cast reprising their respective roles.

Title	Original release date
"Vote, Dude!"	September 12, 2018
The gang, now eighteen years old, reunite at the mall and discuss topics about the 2018 US midterms, such as Wyatt's criticism of Donald Trump, Jonesy's support of MAGA, Nikki's dissatisfaction with democracy, Jen's enthusiasm for voting, and Caitlin's ignorance towards politics. Jude gives out a compelling speech about the importance of voting and encourages everyone to vote, but Darth reminds the group that they cannot vote for the midterms since they all live in Canada, resulting in them going back to their daily routine.
