= Gage Munroe =

Canadian actor

- Born: January 4, 1999 (age 27); Toronto, Ontario, Canada
- Occupation: Actor
- Years active: 2007–present

Gage Munroe (born January 4, 1999) is a Canadian actor. He has performed roles on television programs like Stoked, Murdoch Mysteries, Mr Moon, Falling Skies, and Alphas, and has appeared in films like the 2008 Canadian drama One Week (directed by Michael McGowan) and the 2011 epic Immortals (alongside Henry Cavill and Mickey Rourke).

Munroe's best known role was as PK in the festival-lauded Canadian action film I Declare War. He is also known for providing the voices of Hank N Stein in Hotel Transylvania: The Series, Justin in the first two seasons of Justin Time, Marshall in the first season of PAW Patrol, and for playing Josh Philips in the Christian drama The Shack.

== Filmography ==
Film roles
Year	Film	Role	Notes
2008	Coopers' Camera	Dougie	
2008	One Week	Young Ben	
2010	Break a Leg		Short film
2010	Devil	Jesse Bowden	Uncredited
2011	Immortals	Acamas	Minor role
2012	I Declare War	P.K.	Main role
2012	Mad Ship	Petter	
2014	Skating to New York	Art Bouchard	
2015	Pirate's Passage	Jim Hawkins	
2017	The Shack	Josh Philips	
2018	Seven in Heaven	Eric Dragle	
2019	Brotherhood	Jack Wigington	
2019	Guest of Honour	Walter	
2021	Nobody	Brady Mansell	
2022	Luckiest Girl Alive	Peyton Powell	
2025	Nobody 2	Brady Mansell	
2027	Lice	TBA	Post-production

Television roles
Year	Title	Role	Notes
2007	Super Why!	Dragon (voice)	Episode #1.6
2008	ReGenesis	Ryan / Kid	Episode: "The Truth"
2008	An Old Fashioned Thanksgiving	Solomon Bassett	Hallmark Channel Original Movie
2009	The Jon Dore Television Show	Boy	Episode: "Jon's Christmas"
2009	Hotbox	Unknown	1 episode
2009	Stoked	George Ridgemount (voice)	11 episodes
2009–2012	My Big Big Friend	Matt	25 episodes
2010	Doodlebops Rockin' Road Show	Steve	1 episode
2010	Bloodletting & Miraculous Cures	Devil Child	TV miniseries; episode: "Family Practice"
2010	Murdoch Mysteries	Bobby Brackenreid	Episode: "Rich Boy, Poor Boy"
2010	The Bridge	Eddy	Episode: "God Bless the Child"
2010	The Ron James Show	Thomas	Episode #2.6
2010	The Night Before the Night Before Christmas	Toby Fox	Hallmark Channel Original Movie; Nominated – Young Artist Award for Best Performance in a TV Movie, Miniseries or Special – Leading Young Actor
2010	Sundays at Tiffany's	Young Michael	Lifetime Channel Film
2010	Mr Moon	Mr. Moon (voice)	52 episodes
2011	Life with Boys	Jimmy	Episode: "Battling Bullies with Boys"
2011	Babar and the Adventures of Badou	Jake (voice)	2 episodes
2011	Falling Skies	Eli Russell	Episode: "Sanctuary: Part 1"
2011-2014	Justin Time	Justin (voice)	Main role (Seasons 1-2)
2012	The Firm	Kyle Hannon	Episode: "Chapter Ten"
2012	Alphas	Tyler Hicks	2 episodes
2013	Beauty & the Beast	Milo	Episode: "On Thin Ice"
2013	Grojband	Mick Mallory (voice)	Episode: "Knight to Remember"
2013–2014	Paw Patrol	Marshall (voice)	Main role (Season 1)
2013	Christmas with Tucker	George McCray	TV movie
2014	Remedy	Kyle West	Episode: "Scary Bears"
2015	The Lizzie Borden Chronicles	Everett Chaswick	Episodes: "The Sisters Grimke", "Capsize"
2015	Dark Matter	T.J.	Episodes: #1.3, #1.6
2016	Little People	Wayne Whale (Voice)	Episode: Team Hero/Potty Ahoy!
2016	Murdoch Mysteries	Stephen Taylor	Episode: "Once Upon a Murdoch Christmas"
2017	The Expanse	Jefferson Errinwright	Episodes: "The Monster and the Rocket", "Caliban's War"
2017–2020	Hotel Transylvania: The Series	Hank N Stein (voice)	Main role
2022	Tales of the Walking Dead	Arnaud	Episode: "Davon"
2022	Transplant	Cory	
2025	Wayward	Riley	Recurring role
