= Really Me =

2011–2013 Canadian TV series

- Genre: Teen sitcom
- Created by: Tom McGillis; Jennifer Pertsch
- Starring: Sydney Imbeau; Kiana Madeira; Wesley Morgan; Azer Greco; Neil Crone; Heather Hanson; Mike Lobel
- Theme music composer: Chantal Kreviazuk; Raine Maida; Jordan Miller; Kylie Miller
- Opening theme: "Story of My Life", performed by Done with Dolls
- Composers: Anthony Vanderburgh; Don Breithaupt
- Country of origin: Canada
- Original language: English
- No. of seasons: 2
- No. of episodes: 26

Production
- Executive producers: Alice Prodanou; Bob Higgins; Sander Schwartz; Brian Irving; Jennifer Pertsch; Tom McGillis; George Elliott
- Producers: Jim Corston; Brian Irving
- Production locations: Toronto, Ontario, Canada
- Cinematography: Mitchell Ness; Gerald Packer
- Editor: Ellen Fine
- Camera setup: Multi-camera
- Running time: approx. 23 mins.
- Production companies: Fresh TV; Really Me Productions

Original release
- Network: Family Channel
- Release: April 22, 2011 – April 5, 2013

Really Me is a Canadian teen sitcom series that originally aired on Family Channel. It premiered on April 22, 2011 and on the French-language VRAK.TV on August 31, 2011. On June 13, 2011, Family announced that the series was being renewed for a second season, which premiered on October 5, 2012. No third season was planned for the series according to the Fresh TV website in 2012. The final episode aired on April 5, 2013 in Canada. It started airing on Netflix in the U.S. on June 15, 2015.

== Plot ==
The series is about a fifteen-year-old girl named Maddy who wins a contest to get her own reality TV show with her best friend Julia. But being a star isn't as easy as Maddy had thought. She has to deal with the cameras and embarrassing moments that will be seen by all her high school peers and friends. Even though there are tons of cameras, mistakes, and drama, Maddy and Julia will always stick together to get through the many obstacles that they face in their everyday life.

== Characters ==
=== Main characters ===
- Maddy Cooper (Sydney Imbeau) – Maddy used to be an average fifteen-year-old girl, but once she won the contest to have her own TV show with Julia her life took a spin. Like most teenage girls Maddy wants to date a cute guy, have tons of fun with her friends and be on TV. She's very optimistic, but sometimes that can take her the wrong way. But for better or worse, Maddy is who she is.
- Julia Wilson (Kiana Madeira) – Julia is Maddy's best friend and always supports her no matter what. She has a crush on Maddy's brother, Brody, but he has no idea. Although, she ends up falling for another guy in "claps of thunder".Julia has a fun and out going personality and she is the type of friend you can count on. Also, she has a knack for opening any lock.
- Brody Cooper (Wesley Morgan) – Maddy's brother, Brody was born for TV and he loves fame and fortune even more than Maddy. He's a popular athlete, and captain of almost every team at school. He slacks a lot at school and doing work, and he's always desperate for attention.
- Clarke Cooper (Azer Greco) – Clarke is a very smart little eight-year-old. He is said to be smarter than both his father and brother, Brody, combined. Being famous doesn't bother him since he thinks he would already be famous and rich someday. He has a crush on Julia.
- Ray Cooper (Neil Crone) – Ray was once a professional hockey player, but still acts like a frat boy. He's the widowed father of Maddy and is thought to have too many pucks to the head because of his silly dad behaviour. He has a lot of time on his hands but he's not very smart so he can easily find himself in ridiculous situations.
- Charlene (Heather Hanson) – Charlene is the television producer for Maddy's show. She is very sarcastic, stressed out and tends to yell a lot on the phone. However, deep down she's truly a sweet person and cares for Maddy and her family. But when the ratings go low, Charlene does whatever it takes to create drama in Maddy's life.
- DJ (Mike Lobel) – He just came out of film school, but he is not that smart. He's very eager to please but sometimes forgets to do his job and film the show. He often falls for Maddy's tricks to ditch him and can end up chasing another blond-haired teenager while Maddy escapes. For some reason, he always talks like a slacker (also known as dude slang).
- Mr. Henshaw (Seán Cullen) – Maddy and Julia's mean-spirited and tyrannical science teacher who despises the Cooper family.

== Episodes ==
=== Season 1 (2011–12) ===
No. overall	No. in season	Title	Directed by	Written by	Original release date	Prod. code
1	1	"A Star Is Born"	Brian K. Roberts	Jennifer Pertsch	March 26, 2011	101
Maddy wins her own reality TV show featuring her and her family.
2	2	"Fandemonium"	Brian K. Roberts	Unknown	April 24, 2011	102
Maddy worries over a negative comment by an online viewer, trying to discover the viewer's identity; Ray is saddened by his family's forgetting his birthday.
3	3	"Grounded in Reality"	Brian K. Roberts	Unknown	May 1, 2011	103
Maddy's show is nominated for an award, but after getting in trouble at school, she may not be able to attend the awards show. Note: Twixxer is a parody of Twitter. A Twixx is a parody of a Tweet.
4	4	"Score"	Brian K. Roberts	Alex Ganetakos	May 8, 2011	104
Maddy accidentally destroys Ray's favourite possession while he is out of town and attempts to repair it before he returns.
5	5	"Save the Date!"	Brian K. Roberts	Alice Prodanou	July 22, 2011	108
The overprotective men of Maddy's family make it difficult for her to date.
6	6	"Comedy Gold...Fish"	Brian K. Roberts	Alice Prodanou	August 12, 2011	106
Clarke gives Maddy a task so important failure may mean the end of their relationship; Brody's attempts to make the ill Ray feel better only worsen the situation.
7	7	"Tough Break"	Marta Borowski	Lyndon Casey	August 12, 2011	110
Maddy and an old friend meet; Brody enters a sleeping competition.
8	8	"Too C.U.T.E."	Brian K. Roberts	Unknown	August 19, 2011	105
Maddy tries to raise money for a good cause but must compete with Brody after he sets up a similar fundraiser.
9	9	"Best Frenemies Forever"	Brian K. Roberts	Conor Casey	September 2, 2011	109
Maddy and Tiara fight after Charlene creates a fake commercial; Brody attempts to help Clarke win over Julia.
10	10	"Jealous of My Relish"	Brian K. Roberts	Jennifer Pertsch	November 20, 2011	111
Maddy is forced to make a decision that may come between her and her family after becoming a spokesperson for the Beach Shack.
11	11	"A Very Maddy Christmas"	Brian K. Roberts	Alex Ganetakos	December 3, 2011	107
Maddy tries to make things right after she upsets her family's Christmas vacation plans.
12	12	"Mad Matt"	Brian K. Roberts	Unknown	December 17, 2011	112
Newton asks Julia out on a date; Brody does his best to act like the man of the house.
13	13	"Really Donkers"	Brian K. Roberts	Alex Ganetakos	March 23, 2012	113
As Maddy's show faces cancellation, she offers to pull an audacious stunt her father disapproves of.

=== Season 2 (2012–13) ===
No. overall	No. in season	Title	Directed by	Written by	Original release date	Prod. code
14	1	"A Newtmare on Elm Street"	Unknown	Unknown	October 5, 2012	201
Maddy begins to have romantic dreams about Newton, forcing her to take action.
15	2	"Scary Poppins"	Unknown	Unknown	October 19, 2012	202
When Maddy is left babysitting, Ray pretends to be rake face to scare the kids. Meanwhile, Brody is doing challenges like pumpkin carving to get a girl.
16	3	"Extreme Sixteen"	Unknown	Unknown	November 9, 2012	212
Maddy gets on Extreme Sixteen but the producer of Extreme Sixteen gets rid of Julia. Brody wants his own sweet sixteen. Guest Star: Brittany Adams as Gwennifer Note: Maddy turns sixteen in this episode. Also, pictures of Brody at Maddy's party are seen during the credits.
17	4	"Cuffed Up"	Unknown	Unknown	December 26, 2012	204
Ray tries to get Maddy and Brody to get along and he ends up handcuffing them together.
18	5	"Get Him to the Geek"	Unknown	Unknown	January 6, 2013	205
Maddy and Brody try to get a good birthday present for Clarke. Ray tries to make a good birthday party for Clarke.
19	6	"Oh Brody, Where Art Thou?"	Unknown	Unknown	January 11, 2013	206
Maddy accidentally breaks up Tiara and her boyfriend so she makes a dating show to get Tiara a new boyfriend. The new boyfriend turns out to be Brody but Brody eventually doesn't want to be Tiara's boyfriend so Maddy gets Tiara to break up with him but when she does, she makes Brody unpopular, so she has to make Brody popular again. Meanwhile, Clarke and Ray start selling delicious hot dogs, which starts to overthrow Moondoggie's business.
20	7	"Truth or Dare"	Unknown	Unknown	January 25, 2013	207
Brody makes a bet on whether Maddy can lie or not. Ray decides to adopt an egg.
21	8	"Clap of Thunder"	Unknown	Unknown	February 8, 2013	208
Julia auditions for a play so she can kiss a cute guy but Maddy gets the lead instead and Julia becomes an understudy. Ray finds a conveyer belt from a garbage truck and Brody, Clarke and him decide to play with it.
22	9	"UFO-ney"	Unknown	Unknown	February 15, 2013	210
With a Maddy - Brody prank war in full effect, Maddy and Julia pull the ultimate practical joke on Brody, convincing him that he's had an alien encounter. But things quickly spiral out of control.
23	10	"Cooper Collegiate"	Unknown	Unknown	February 22, 2013	211
When Maddy receives a failing grade on a science project, she convinces Dad of Mr. Henshaw's 'evil-ness' and ends up being home-schooled. While home-school seems cool at first, Maddy ends up missing her BFF Julia.
24	11	"Sauce Boss"	Unknown	Unknown	March 1, 2013	209
When Maddy receives a failing grade on a science project, she convinces Dad of Mr. Henshaw's 'evil-ness' and ends up being home-schooled. While home-school seems cool at first, Maddy ends up missing her BFF Julia.
25	12	"Residence Evil"	Unknown	Unknown	March 29, 2013	213
Julia arranges for a new zombie film to be shot at Maddy's house.
26	13	"You're Really Me!"	Brian K. Roberts	Ethan Banville	April 5, 2013	211
Maddy uses her newfound lookalike to her advantage.

=== Shorts (2011) ===
No.	Title	Original air date (Canada)	End of airing (finale)	Prod. code
1	"Cruisin"	December 5, 2011	December 12, 2011	RM01
2	"The Cruise is Great"	December 13, 2011	December 15, 2011	RM02
3	"What's Your Favourite Part?"	December 16, 2011	December 25, 2011	RM03

== Telecast and home release ==
Really Me originally aired on Family Channel. It premiered on April 22, 2011 and on the French-language VRAK.TV on August 31, 2011. The final episode aired on April 5, 2013 in Canada with repeats aired until the mid-2010s. It started airing on Netflix in the U.S. on June 15, 2015. Foreign networks had been aired with the show: HBO Family in Latin America and Brazil, Pop Girl in the United Kingdom, RTÉ Two (part of TRTÉ) in Ireland, JOJO in Turkey, Frisbee in Italy, KiKa in Germany, ABC3 in Australia, Star TV in Romania, and Disney Channel in the Netherlands and Belgium.

In the early 2010s, Australian distributor is eventually planning a three-disc DVD set (seasons 1 and 2) with all episodes from the show.
