= Grojband =

Canadian animated television series

- Promotional poster depicting the main characters; from left to right: Laney, Corey, Kin and Kon
- Genre: Comedy; Musical
- Created by: Todd Kauffman; Mark Thornton
- Directed by: Todd Kauffman; Mark Thornton
- Voices of: Lyon Smith; Bryn McAuley; Tim Beresford; Sergio Di Zio; Alyson Court; Denise Oliver; Graeme Cornies
- Theme music composer: Brian Pickett; Graeme Cornies
- Opening theme: "Grojband" performed by Lyon Smith
- Composers: Brian Pickett; Graeme Cornies; James Chapple; David Kelly
- Country of origin: Canada
- Original language: English
- No. of seasons: 1
- No. of episodes: 26 (50 segments)

Production
- Executive producers: Tom McGillis; Jennifer Pertsch; Brian Irving; George Elliott; Bob Higgins; Sander Schwartz
- Production locations: Toronto, Ontario, Canada
- Editors: Mary Dorich; Tom Berger
- Running time: 11 minutes (48 short-length segments); 22 minutes (2 long-length specials)
- Production companies: Elliott Animation; Neptoon Studios; Fresh TV; FremantleMedia Enterprises

Original release
- Network: Teletoon
- Release: September 12, 2013 – March 10, 2014

Grojband (a phonetic spelling of "garage band") is a Canadian animated television series created by Todd Kauffman and Mark Thornton for Teletoon in Canada and Cartoon Network in the United States. Produced by Fresh TV and Neptoon Studios, with animation by Elliott Animation, in association with FremantleMedia Enterprises, the series premiered on June 10, 2013, in the United States, on September 5, 2013, in Canada, and on April 21, 2014 in the United Kingdom. It is executive produced by Tom McGillis and Jennifer Pertsch, the creators of the hit animated reality franchise Total Drama. 26 episodes were produced.

== Synopsis ==
Grojband follows the story of a Canadian indie rock garage band of the same name, formed by Corey Riffin and his three best friends: Laney and twin brothers Kin and Kon. Together, they strive to propel their band to international stardom. When they struggle to come up with lyrics, Corey and his friends enlist the help of Trina, Corey's sister. By tapping into her emotions to write entries in her diary, they find the lyrical inspiration they need for Corey to create the perfect song.

== Characters ==
=== Grojband ===
- Corey Jaron Riffin (voiced by Lyon Smith) – Corey is the younger brother of Trina Riffin. He is the confident, optimistic, laidback, and quirky 13-year-old leader, vocalist, and guitarist of Grojband. Although good-natured, he is on a constant search for new gigs for the band to perform at and will do whatever it takes to play music at them, which is usually by angering his sister, Trina, who will write in her diary. He then translates her venting into lyrics for their songs due to the fact he is unable to come up with lyrics of his own. He is named after the late Canadian musician Corey Crewe.
- Laney Penn (voiced by Bryn McAuley) – Laney is the bassist, vocalist and self-proclaimed band manager of Grojband. She is the younger sister of Chloe. Laney is a short, sarcastic, ambitious, and passionate redhead and the only female in the band, the latter of which everyone else isn't able to acknowledge. She tends to be the most rational member of the band, mainly because she cares about the others, but is usually prone to giving in to Corey and his schemes. This is because she has a crush on Corey, to which Corey is oblivious towards. Her name is a pun on the famous Beatles song "Penny Lane".
- Kin Kujira (voiced by Sergio Di Zio) – Kin is the Japanese keyboardist of the band, and Kon's small, bespectacled older twin brother and best friend. Despite his eccentric behaviour and antics, he is extremely smart and has a knack for advanced technology, often building strange gadgets that help the band with their gigs.
- Kon Kujira (voiced by Tim Beresford) – Kon is the Japanese drummer of the band, and Kin's large, overweight younger twin brother and best friend. Kon is sometimes dense and just as crazy as his brother Kin, but is very strong, usually well-meaning, and has a cherubic and excitable demeanor. He and his brother derive their first names from King Kong and their last name from Gojira, the Japanese name for Godzilla.

=== The Newmans ===
The Newmans are a gender-reversed doppelgänger band to Grojband. They are Grojband's rivals and always compete with them for different gigs or in contests. They are named after the character Newman from Seinfeld. Their voice actors are the same as the original Grojband.

- Carrie Beff – Corey's doppelgänger: a stuck-up, shallow girl who is the leader, guitarist, and vocalist of The Newmans. She is also Mina's younger sister. As seen throughout the show, Corey and Carrie are bitter enemies, as one would love to see the other go down. However, both have shown a slight tolerance for each other, and will work together if the situation calls for it.
- Larry (Lenny) Nepp – Laney's gender-bent rival: bassist and band manager of The Newmans. Similar to Laney, Larry has a visible crush on Carrie, Corey's gender-warped rival, as seen in one episode. He isn't as courageous as her, though.
- Kim Kagami – Kin's gender-bent rival, who is also the keyboardist of The Newmans. When Grojband and the Newmans fused together in one episode, Kin fused with Kim and both showed some jealousy against their respective twin for being such great friends with each other.
- Konnie Kagami – Kon's gender-bent rival, who is also the drummer of The Newmans. In one episode, it is shown that under certain circumstances, Kon and Konnie are able to get along.

=== Others ===
- Katrina "Trina" Riffin (voiced by Alyson Court) – Trina is Corey's 16-year-old sister. She is mean, cruel, self-centered, and always determined to make Corey's life miserable. She is the series' main antagonist and constantly tries to ruin Grojband's gigs. Whenever she is overcome with emotion (usually anger, sometimes love/happiness, fear, or sadness), she impulsively writes her diary in a dramatic manner, which provides Grojband with the lyrical inspiration they need for their songs. She has a crush on the cute neighborhood boy, Nick Mallory, who doesn't give her the time of day. She was kind with others at one point in her life. She is named after the late Canadian musician Trina Crewe.
- Bernadette "Mina" Beff (voiced by Denise Oliver) – Mina is a timid, naive, and bespectacled 16-year-old girl who thinks is Trina's best friend, but in reality, she is more like her slave. Although much nicer than Trina, she wishes to be as cool as Trina, and does whatever she tells her to do. Her real name is Bernadette, but Trina forced her to legally change it so their names would rhyme. She is also Carrie's older sister. Her last name is a pun on the phrase "BFF", or "Best Friends Forever". In the series finale, after Trina abandons her to be destroyed by a meteor, Mina finally snaps, stands up to Trina and scolds her for everything she went through for her so-called friend.
- Nick Mallory (voiced by Graeme Cornies) – Nick is an extremely cool and handsome 16-year-old boy, whom all the girls in school adore, especially Trina. He is sometimes referred to as "Hunky Nick Mallory" by Trina and many others around him. He always refers to himself in the third person, but isn't inherently antagonistic, and will sometimes aid the band when they see use of him. He has a little brother named Mick Mallory who looks and acts just like him. He is named after Nick Moore and Mallory Keaton, two characters from the sitcom Family Ties.
- Kate Persky and Allie Day (voiced by Addison Holley and Madelyn May respectively) – Allie and Kate are Grojband's 9-year-old groupies and their biggest (and possibly, only) fans. They are head-over-heels in love with Corey, and are willing to do anything for him, but they can be creepy and obsessive at times. They are named after the title characters of the sitcom Kate & Allie, while their last names come from Bill Persky and Linda Day, the directors of the aforementioned series.
- Mayor Mellow (voiced by Kedar Brown) – The diminutive mayor of Peaceville, who is always seen carrying a picture of his mother around, and speaks in rhymes. He is well-intentioned and wants what is best for his town, but his ways to do it are questionable and often extreme. He also has a somewhat short fuse, and he jumps to the conclusion too soon at times. In "The Pirate Lounge for Me", Mellow is revealed to have been a former lounge singer known as Melodious Monk.
- Buzz Newsworthy and Chance Happening (voiced by Dwayne Hill and Julie Lemieux respectively) – The news anchors of the Peaceville News. They are quick on the scene to cover important news events. However they have a habit of exaggerating the stories. They also sometimes have feuds over who is more proficient.

=== Recurring ===
- Barney (voiced by Robert Tinkler) – A very rich billionaire who owns multiple businesses around Peaceville. He is always addressed by the name of the business in front of his real name: such as while he works at the salad restaurant he is referred to as "Salad Barney", or at the coffee house he is referred to as "Bean Barney".
- Party Danimal (voiced by Christian Potenza) – The school party critic who first appeared in the episode "Pox N' Roll", he rates other people's parties with a score out of "10 Awesomes".
- Captain Tighty Whitey (voiced by Robert Tinkler) – A pirate captain who enjoys stealing things from people and finding treasure. He first appeared in the episode "On the Air and Out to Sea".
- G'ORB (voiced by Robert Tinkler) – An evil alien space orb who is bent on destroying the world. He is the leader of a band called The Orb Experience, made up of three other space orbs named T'ORB, Z'ORB, and N'ORB. He first appeared in the episode "Space Jammin'" where he challenged Grojband to a battle of the bands and lost. He was only a minor one-time character with the rest of the band until he returned in the finale episode "Hear Us Rock Part 2", where he returned and challenged Grojband to a rematch and threatened to destroy the world with an apocalyptic meteor if they lost. G'ORB cheated in the battle of the bands to make him win but at the end of the episode, T'ORB had become fed up with putting up with all of his plans, he stood up to him, overthrew him and let Grojband win. After this, T'ORB broke up the band, forced G'ORB to apologize, and made him give up evil and become good.
- Chloe Penn (character has no spoken dialogue) – A tall redhead girl who mainly appears in the show as a background character. Chloe is shown to have a romantic interest towards Nick Mallory, as well as Party Danimal in one occasion. Co-creator Todd Kauffman confirmed her to be Laney's older sister, albeit unofficially.

== Episodes ==
No.	Title	Written by	Canadian air date	American air date
1a	"Cloudy with a Chance of Malt Balls"	Amy Cole	September 12, 2013	June 10, 2013
Corey, Laney, Kin, and Kon must impress movie star Cherry Grapestain to get Grojband music into her new movie trailer. They have to impress her at her new premiere and rock the drive-in. Trina's emotion: Anger; Song: "Cherry Cherry"
1b	"Dance of the Dead"	Meghan Read	September 12, 2013	June 10, 2013
When a haunted amp and Corey's terrible lyrics meet, zombies rise from the dead to eat brains in Peaceville. Trina's emotion: Anger; Songs: "Halloween Song" and "Zombie Dance"
2a	"Pox N' Roll"	Kyle Hart	October 3, 2013	June 11, 2013
When Corey gets chicken pox, Trina alerts the Mayor who seals the place in an outbreak dome – with Trina inside, no less. Corey wants to throw an amazing party after contracting chicken pox. Trina's emotion: Love; Song: "Chicken Pox Rocks!"
2b	"No Strings Attached"	Meghan Read	October 3, 2013	June 11, 2013
Corey's favorite animatronic band, The Bubble Bunch (a parody of Yo Gabba Gabba!) is retiring. Trina decides to melt the puppet band (along with Corey's inspiration) and now Corey uses Grojband as a replacement of The Bubble Bunch. Trina's emotion: Fear; Songs: "Bubble Bunch Band Theme Song" and "Running from the Puppets"
3a	"In-D Road Rager"	Miles Smith	October 17, 2013	June 12, 2013
Corey takes the coolness of indie music a little too far, and unwittingly enters his band in an indie race called the local Indie Indie 400. Trina's emotion: Anger; Song: "Thrash, Bash, Burn and Crash"
3b	"Math of Kon"	Amy Cole	October 17, 2013	June 12, 2013
Corey has booked the band to play the Try-Math-Alon, since nerds are an untapped fanbase, so Corey has Kon win the "Try-Math-Alon" to allow the band to play there. Trina's emotion: Anger; Song: "Math Song"
4a	"Space Jammin'"	Kyle Hart	November 14, 2013	June 13, 2013
Grojband gets shut out of Peaceville's version of Woodstock, Slugfest and encounter aliens that want to battle with their band for making a crop circle that summoned them. Trina's emotion: Anger; Songs: "Entry 4987: My Secret Fear and Junk" and "My Secret is Out"
4b	"Wish Upon a Jug"	Mike Kiss	November 14, 2013	June 13, 2013
Trina and Corey battle each other with wishes by using genies that they found them inside jugs. Corey is able to find a cow genie in a milk bottle and try to wish his musical mojo back – but the genie rules prohibit it. Trina's emotion: Anger; Song: "I Wish Away My Wishes"
5a	"All You Need is Cake"	Meghan Read	November 7, 2013	June 14, 2013
Corey and Laney must "fall in love" for the band to sing at a wedding and get free cake; however, they also run the risk of ruining their friendship with Kin and Kon and having Grojband disbanded. Trina's emotion: Sadness; Song: "Please Come Back"
5b	"Helmet"	Laurie Elliott	November 7, 2013	June 14, 2013
After Corey's voice starts cracking, Kin makes a helmet that "auto-tones" his voice, but (thanks to Trina) the helmet becomes evil and uses its laser to turn anything imperfect, perfect. Trina's emotion: Love; Song: "Perfect"
6a	"Monster of Rock"	Ethan Banville	September 5, 2013	June 17, 2013
Corey thinks underground music is the band's thing, but accidentally awakens a sewer monster when Grojband practices for an underground gig that is literally underground. Trina's emotion: Anger; Song: "Sweet Dreams"
6b	"One Plant Band"	Craig Martin	September 5, 2013	June 17, 2013
Corey attempts to make the band go vegan to play the opening of a new vegan restaurant. Grojband's music makes Trina's science project plant become self-aware. Trina's emotion: Anger; Song: "Cheesy Cheese Song" and "Yeah!"
7a	"Creep Away Camp"	Laurie Elliott	September 19, 2013	June 19, 2013
Grojband competes against the Newmans in a scary campfire song contest, as Corey and the band seek help from scare-master Blade Stabbington. Trina's emotion: Anger; Songs: "Ghosts of Clowns" and "Welcome to My Nightmare"
7b	"Zoohouse Rock"	Ethan Banville	September 19, 2013	June 19, 2013
Thinking costumes may be the Grojband's new gimmick, Corey dresses the band in bear costumes, but Trina gets them locked up in Major Mellow's zoo. Trina's emotion: Anger; Song: "Stuck in Peaceville Zoo"
8a	"Smash Up Terby"	Mark Satterthwaite, Mark Thornton, & Todd Kauffman	September 26, 2013	June 21, 2013
Corey and the band are booked to play the demolition derby, and they’ll have to enter Trina in the derby to get their lyrics. Trina's emotion: Anger; Songs: "Butt Crack Neighbor" and "Tire Tracks"
8b	"Queen Bee"	Brandon Birch	September 26, 2013	June 21, 2013
Trina enters the Peaceville Queen Bee pageant, and it's up to Grojband to make sure she wins to get new happy lyrics from her to play there. Trina's emotion: Anger; Song: "Queen Bee"
9	"Dreamreaver"	Ethan Banville	October 10, 2013	June 25, 2013
In this half-hour episode, Grojband's first music video goes awry, as Trina watches it and her brain breaks. Corey, Laney, Kin, and Kon must go inside her insane mind to stop it (and to retrieve some twisted lyrics as well). Trina's emotion: Anger; Songs: "Booty Booty Pow!" and "My Mind"
10a	"Super Zeroes"	Laurie Elliott	November 21, 2013	June 27, 2013
Corey decides on a new gimmick to play at kid's parties dressed as superheroes, but Trina tries to out them as frauds and her plan backfires. Trina's emotion: Anger; Song: "We're not Heroes"
10b	"Knight to Remember"	Miles Smith	November 21, 2013	June 27, 2013
When a comet passes by Peaceville, the town becomes an old medieval time of knights and adventure, and then Mina starts to act like Trina. Corey gets the band a job as royal minstrels to a fake princess at a LARP game. Mina's emotion: Anger; Song: "Go Away"
11a	"Line of Credit"	Ethan Banville	December 5, 2013	July 1, 2013
Believing that nothing is cooler than cred, Grojband has to go straight to get cred, but they'll have to go thug first. Corey decides to become tough to improve the band's image. Trina's emotion: Anger; Song: "Knock it Off"
11b	"Hair Today, Kon Tomorrow"	Kyle Hart	December 5, 2013	July 1, 2013
Hair metal and a dog show collide when Corey thinks it's time for Hair Metal to make a comeback at the Peaceville Doggie Doozie Dog Show. Things get crazier from there when Kon thinks he's a dog. Trina's emotion: Anger; Song: "Dog Gone"
12a	"On the Air and Out to Sea"	Brandon Birch	December 5, 2013	July 3, 2013
When Corey's pirate radio station stops actual pirates from listening, it leads to a run-in with real pirates and the band is forced to walk the plank. Trina's emotion: Anger; Song: "My Heart is in the Sea"
12b	"Ahead of Our Tone"	Evan Thaler Hickey	December 5, 2013	July 3, 2013
Trying to be "ahead of their time," the band travels into the future to bring back the music trend from one year ahead – only to discover it is ruled by an evil cyborg Trina. Trina's emotion: Love; Song: "You're Going Down"
13a	"Love In a Nethervator"	Kyle Hart	December 12, 2013	July 8, 2013
Elevator music sinks to new lows – elevator music at the center of the earth. Trina's emotion: Anger; Song: "Busting out of Here"
13b	"Six Strings of Evil"	Amy Cole	December 12, 2013	July 8, 2013
After Trina destroys Corey's guitar with a woodchipper, Corey decides to buy a new one, which just happens to be evil. Trina's emotion: Anger; Song: "No I Won't Play"
14a	"Rockersize"	Dave Dias	November 5, 2014	February 23, 2015 (Note: This episode was first released on the Cartoon Network app and website on March 31, 2014.)
Grojband offers an impromptu concert to three old women who take gym class. Trina's emotion: Anger; Song: "Yesterday"
14b	"Grin Reaper"	Dennise Fordham	November 5, 2014	February 23, 2015
Peaceville is under a happy spell by the happiest man in the world. Trina's emotion: Anger; Song: "Everything Stinks"
15a	"Rock the House"	Kyle Hart	March 12, 2015	February 28, 2015
Grojband faces off against the Newmans in a Battle of the Bands Extreme Curling competition. Trina's emotion: Anger; Song: "We Are Victorious"
15b	"War and Peaceville"	Scott Oleszkowicz	March 12, 2015	February 28, 2015
Peaceville's centennial erupts in a Riffin/Mallory feud when Corey sings the original inflammatory town anthem. Trina's emotion: Love; Songs: "100 Years Ago Today" and "100 Years Ago Today Remake"
16a	"Myme Disease"	Meghan Read	March 19, 2015	March 1, 2015
When the favorite town statue (who was actually a statue performer) is taken down, Grojband decides to take the prime performance spot left behind. A turf war erupts between Corey and a group of mimes when they take the last busking spot in the park. Meanwhile, Trina is having her portrait painted by Nick Mallory. Trina's emotion: Anger; Song: "Quiet Noise"
16b	"Kon-fusion"	Scott Oleszkowicz	March 19, 2015	March 1, 2015
Grojband and the Newmans must form a music mashup at DJ Fusion's restaurant Fuse This. What happens, however, when they are fused up by Trina's evil plan to fuse her hand with Nick Mallory's hand (so they can be together forever) and Grojband and the Newmans are fused into 4 individual "freaks"? Trina's emotion: Anger; Song: "1+1"
17a	"Inn-Er Face"	Craig Martin	March 26, 2015	March 7, 2015
The science fair is underway, and Corey wants to prove the healing powers of rock, but Trina shrinks and ingests Kon, leading to a Fantastic Voyage-esque adventure. Trina's emotion: Anger; Song: "You Turned All My Protons into Kon-Tons"
17b	"Who Are You"	Jeff Detsky	March 26, 2015	March 7, 2015
Corey hears that hipsters only like bands they've never heard of, and he thinks Grojband is a perfect fit. Trina's emotion: Love; Song: "Shades"
18a	"Pop Goes the Bubble"	Evan Thaler Hickey	April 2, 2015	March 8, 2015
Grojband is going pop at Peaceville's Annual Soda-Fest, the Carbo-Nation Festival, but thanks to some meddling from Trina, Mayor Mellow bans bubbles, including soda bubbles, because Major Mellow has a bottle cap inside his brain. Corey takes it upon the band to save the bubbles, but how will they make the flat town bubbly again? Trina's emotion: Anger; Song: "This Bubble Don't Pop"
18b	"Girl Fest"	Amy Benham	April 2, 2015	March 8, 2015
Tough girl-rocker Candy Jams mistakes Laney for the bandleader, making Grojband her opener. Trina's emotion: Anger; Songs: "Sweet Dreams (Reprise)" and "You're So Untrue"
19a	"The Bandidate"	Amy Cole	April 9, 2015	March 14, 2015
Corey thinks Grojband needs to get political, and decides to speak out against new school president Trina. Trina's emotion: Anger; Song: "Bring her Down"
19b	"The Pirate Lounge for Me"	Brandon Birch	April 9, 2015	March 14, 2015
Wanting to combine rocking with relaxing leads Corey to transform the garage into a swingin' lounge, and even Mayor Mellow gets into the swing. He orders the town to chill out, but their lowered guard leaves the town open to a pirate invasion. Trina's emotion: Happiness; Song: "Nothing"
20a	"Hologroj"	Kyle Hart	April 27, 2015	March 15, 2015
Believing nothing bumps up a band's popularity like a mysterious disappearance, Corey tells the news that Grojband has vanished, and plans to capitalize with a performance by hologram versions of the band. Trina's emotion: Anger; Song: "I'm Back"
20b	"The Snuffles with Snarffles"	Mike Kiss	April 27, 2015	March 15, 2015
Corey decides to use music to bring awareness to the sniffles suffered by Snuffles, a cute local puppy, earning the hatred of local war hero, Wheelie the Cat. Trina's emotion: Love; Song: "Kitty Rock"
21a	"Bee Bop a Loofah"	Ashley Lannigan	May 4, 2015	March 21, 2015
When Trina makes the town's water reservoir run dry, nobody can take showers anymore, and so their hygiene deteriorates. Corey and the band decide to end the stink wave by rocking out through the sewer pipes. The Peaceville Stationary Marathon is coming, providing the perfect audience for Grojband's newest thing – shower music. Trina's emotion: Anger; Song: "B.O. Away"
21b	"A-capella-lips Now"	Brandon Birch	May 4, 2015	March 21, 2015
Peaceville is flooded and the power is out, but Corey sees the perfect opportunity to go unplugged. Trina's emotion: Anger; Song: "Stuck on the Island"
22a	"Soulin' Down the Road"	Mike Kiss	May 11, 2015	March 22, 2015
When Kin's soul-amplifier malfunctions, Trina's soul is trapped in her car. Corey has to find a way to free it, and get lyrics for the show, but the problem is that Trina enjoys being a car. Trina's emotion: Sadness; Songs: "Baby, Baby, Yeah!" and "These Old Rusty Eyes"
22b	"That's My Jam"	Mike Kiss	May 11, 2015	March 22, 2015
Corey is determined to win the Peaceville jam competition with this summer's hot new jam. Trina's emotion: Anger; Song: "That's My Jam"
23a	"For Hat and Country"	Ian MacIntyre	May 18, 2015	March 28, 2015
Corey wants the coolest cowboy hat he's ever seen, but it can only be sold to someone who is "truly country." Corey sees only one way to prove he's worthy – by separating from Peaceville and forming the People's Rockpublic of Grojland. Trina's emotion: Anger; Song: "I Must be Losing my Mind"
23b	"It's In the Card"	Dave Dias	May 18, 2015	March 28, 2015
If Grojband is going to be a Valentine's band, they need to get their love song into a huge pile of electronic greeting cards, but when everyone in town breaks up, they're to blame. Trina's emotion: Love; Song: "Love" and "Your Card"
24a	"Saxsquatch"	Doug Hadders & Adam Rotstein	May 18, 2015	March 29, 2015
Corey's desire to play atop Howling Heights mountain leads the band to find the Saxquatch. Trina's emotion: Anger; Song: "One More Memory of You"
24b	"Group Hug"	Meghan Reed	May 18, 2015	March 29, 2015
Grojband's first groupies decide that they should have their own dedicated song so other fans know who comes first. Trina's emotion: Sadness; Song: "Corey's Groupie Song" and "Our Number Ones Always Came First"
25a	"Curse of the Metrognome"	Craig Martin	May 25, 2015	April 11, 2015
With Grojband set to play New Year's Eve, Trina unleashes the mystical Metrognome – a little guy with a big appetite for timing. Trina's emotion: Anger; Song: "When we Make Today Our Day"
25b	"Dueling Buttons"	Kyle Hart	May 25, 2015	April 11, 2015
Solo Shredder, the guitar-based video game, has rolled into Peaceville, and Corey is sure he can prove he's the best, but when Trina bests him, he's not sure what he's good at anymore. Trina's emotion: Anger; Song: "Nick Nicky Nick" and "Sick Tricky Lick and a Pick Flick"
26	"Hear Us, Rock!"	Mike Kiss	May 25, 2015	April 12, 2015
In the final episode, the ancient Samban prophecy foretold the Earth would be destroyed by rock on this day. Can Grojband figure out how to save the planet, and what will it cost? Trina's emotions: Sadness and Happiness; Songs: "If the World is Ending" and "I'm Giving it All"

== Production ==
Series co-creator Todd Kauffman has stated that he had always wanted to make a series about a garage band, and believed the concept of having the band's songs come out of the diary of the lead character's sister would make the premise more interesting. Using this idea, he was able to successfully pitch the series to Fresh TV and its president Tom McGillis. Soon afterwards, Teletoon, FremantleMedia, and Cartoon Network all took interest in the project and came in to help with its production and distribution.

The series is animated in Adobe Flash, with series co-creator Mark Thornton stating that using the software removes the need to outsource the show's animation to countries outside of Canada as is commonly done with American animated series. In producing the series, the creators sought to homage and take inspiration from a wide variety of movies and television series, particularly the works of American animators like Craig McCracken, Maxwell Atoms, and Genndy Tartakovsky, as well as Ferris Bueller's Day Off and the works of Phil Lord and Christopher Miller. They also sought to explore many genres and styles of music with the series, including country music, heavy metal, yodeling, sea shanties, and even elevator music.

Many concepts were changed as the series developed. Notably, Grojband was originally pitched as a 22-minute series with its intro and theme song being 60 seconds long, but in the final product, episodes are instead 11 minutes long and the show's intro and theme song are 20 seconds long. These changes resulted in the removal of several plot elements ignored or unexplained in the final product, including the presence of the characters' parents and Corey and his band having to return Trina's diary back to her without being noticed at the end of every episode. Another notable change between the original pitch and the final product is that Corey and Trina's shared last name is "Trippin" instead of "Riffin".

== Broadcast ==
In the United States, the series was aired on Cartoon Network and Boomerang from June 10, 2013 to July 12, 2015. In Canada, it debuted on September 5, 2013 on Teletoon and Télétoon. Grojband debuted on February 10, 2014 on ABC3 in Australia and in April 2014 on Pop in the United Kingdom. The show started airing on April 8, 2014 on Cartoon Network in Africa.

== Home media ==
On December 10, 2013, an official website for the series was launched.

Singles from various episodes were released on the ITunes Store in mid-2013.

In United States of America, the entire was released on DVD, Digital HD, on February 16 2014 by 20th Century Home Entertainment, Two volumes were released: Rock On (containing episodes 1—13) and Hear Us Rock! (containing episodes 14—26)

In Australia, the entire series was released on DVD on June 4, 2014 by Shock Entertainment. Two volumes were released: Rock On (containing episodes 1–13) and Hear Us Rock! (containing episodes 14–26).

On December 1, 2015, all 26 episodes of Grojband were added to Netflix in the US. Two years later, the show was removed.

On December 30, 2025, all 26 episodes of Grojband were added to Tubi.
