= Stoked (TV series) =

Canadian animated television series

- Genre: Comedy; Animation; Teen drama
- Created by: Jennifer Pertsch; Tom McGillis
- Directed by: Faruk Cemalovic
- Voices of: Jeff Geddis; Katie Crown; Kristin Fairlie; Mazin Elsadig; Anastasia Phillips; Arnold Pinnock; Cory Doran
- Theme music composer: Brian Pickett; Greame Cornies
- Composers: James Chapple; David Kelly; Brian Pickett; Graeme Cornies
- Country of origin: Canada
- Original language: English
- No. of seasons: 2
- No. of episodes: 52 (list of episodes)

Production
- Executive producers: Tom McGillis; Jennifer Pertsch; George Elliott; Brian Irving
- Editor: Tom Berger
- Running time: 22 minutes
- Production company: Fresh TV

Original release
- Network: Teletoon
- Release: June 25, 2009 – January 26, 2013

Stoked (stylized as Stōked) is a Canadian animated series produced by Fresh TV that premiered on Teletoon on June 25, 2009 and ended on January 26, 2013. It aired on Teletoon in Canada, ABC3 in Australia and on Cartoon Network in the United States. The series was created by Jennifer Pertsch and Tom McGillis, who also created 6teen and the Total Drama series.

== Plot ==
Stoked was a animated situational comedy about a group of Groms who come together one summer on the legendary Surfer's Paradise Hotel in British Columbia. Emma, Reef, and Fin join locals Broseph, Lo, along her brothers Ty and George, and Johnny to work at the world-renowned Surfer's Paradise Ridgemount Resort, stoked to have the best summer of their lives. But instead they find the worst jobs ever, hideous uniforms, zero respect, a run-down staff house, and a tacky, fake, Kooksville resort. For twelve weeks, they will spend their first summer away from home and work the hardest that they have ever worked in their lives, but most importantly, they have the opportunity to surf on their days off.

== Episodes ==
Season	Episodes		Originally released	
Season	Episodes		First released	Last released
1	26	Canada	June 25, 2009	June 3, 2010
1	26	Australia	September 2, 2010	October 7, 2010
1	26	U.S.	July 16, 2009	July 26, 2010
2	26	Canada	September 16, 2010	January 26, 2013
2	26	Australia	March 24, 2011	April 28, 2011

== Characters ==
=== Main ===
- Reef: The new surf instructor of the resort, he has dreamed of going to Sunset Beach all of his life and finally made it. He wiped out once and slammed his jaw into a reef until he earns his nickname. Reef is voiced by Jeff Geddis.
- Fin McCloud: She is the ultimate surfer girl: tough, enjoyable and laid-back. She is totally into feminism, which is something she and Reef argue frequently about. A running gag is her proficiency for belching. Fin is voiced by Katie Crown.
- Emma Mackenzie: She is from Calgary, Alberta, and before coming to Sunset Beach, but she had never surfed before. She was intent on surfing as soon as she saw a surf film with her older brothers. Emma is voiced by Kristin Fairlie.
- Broseph: He is a chilled-out, local Caribbean surfer, with wisdom that is not seen by many and is a loyal friend. Broseph is voiced by Mazin Elsadig.
- Lauren "Lo" Ridgemount: She is the daughter of the resort's owner. Lo's life has been being spoiled, but is forced to work at the resort by her father after throwing a massive party. She loves shopping and surfing. She is voiced by Anastasia Phillips.
- Johnny St. James: He works at the front desk of the hotel. He also harbours a massive crush on Emma. Johnny is voiced by Arnold Pinnock.

=== Supporting ===
- Andrew "Bummer" Baumer: The day manager of the resort, he is rigid and illiberal with the workers below him. He is voiced by Cory Doran.
- Tyler "Ty" Ridgemount: Lo's older brother who also surfs, and Emma has a crush on. Ty is voiced by Jamie Spilchuk.
- George Ridgemount: Lo and Ty's 12-year-old younger brother. He is voiced by Gage Munroe.
- Grommet: Grommet only appeared in a few episodes. He is Broseph's younger brother and is actually with George, being best friends.
- Ripper: An Australian friend of the group and a soul surfer. Ripper is voiced by Sergio Di Zio.
- "No Pants" Lance: He is another of the returning staff and Ripper's best friend. He is voiced by Cory Doran.
- Kelly: A bossy, selfish, snobbish, and possibly sadistic girl who leads the staff seniors in their harassment and intimidation towards the Groms. She is voiced by Lauren Lipson.
- Rosie: She is a maid at Surfer's Paradise. She is voiced by Fiona Reid.
- Snack Shack: An overweight employee at Surfer's Paradise Ridgemount Resort. He works at the "Snack Shack" at the hotel's pool. He also works part time at a bakery in Sunset Beach that sells beaver tails. He is voiced by Darren Frost.
- Wipeout: Dressed in a purple orca costume, Wipeout poses as the resort's mascot, carrying around a large radio and dancing to greet visitors. He is voiced by Sergio Di Zio.
- Mr. Ridgemount: He is the owner of the resort and is the head of the Ridgemount Hotel chain of which Surfer's Paradise is the flagship property. His face is unseen. He is voiced by Jamie Watson.
- Mrs. Ridgemount: She is Lo, Ty and George's mother and a stereotypical trophy wife, although in a midlife crisis. She is voiced by Emilie-Claire Barlow.
- The Kahuna: He is a very friendly person whose laid-back personality resembles that of a boho guy. He is voiced by Jamie Watson.
- Mark and Todd Marvin: Twin brothers who are guests at the resort and they're the loudest children who get on everyone's nerves.
- Mr. & Mrs. Marvin: They are the parents of Mark and Todd, who frequently allow their children to run wild and undertake destructive behaviour in the hotel. Voiced by Terry McGurrin and Katie Crown.
- Sonny and Buster: A shark and a yellow tang who are two fish that reside in the Lobbyquarium. Buster is friendly and dim-witted, although he tries to be without any violence, and can have a mean dash. Sonny speaks with a New York accent, and makes bets with other fish in the aquarium.

== Telecast and home media ==
Stoked premiered on Teletoon on June 25, 2009 with the final episode aired on January 26, 2013. It aired on Teletoon with repeats until the mid-2010s, ABC3 in Australia and on Cartoon Network in the U.S. In the 2010s, the show has been released on DVD by Phase 4's KaBoom! in Canada. Season 1 was made available for purchase on Apple TV.
