= 6teen =

Canadian animated comedy television series

- Genre: Animated sitcom; Comedy; Teen drama; Teen sitcom
- Created by: Jennifer Pertsch; Tom McGillis
- Directed by: Karen Lessman; Gary Hurst ("Dude of the Living Dead")
- Voices of: Christian Potenza; Brooke D'Orsay; Stacey DePass; Megan Fahlenbock; Jess Mal Gibbons; Terry McGurrin; Jamie Watson; Darren Frost; Emilie-Claire Barlow; Stephanie Anne Mills; Lauren Lipson
- Theme music composer: Don Breithaupt; Anthony Vanderburgh
- Opening theme: "6teen Theme" by Phil Naro
- Ending theme: "6teen Theme" (instrumental)
- Composers: Don Breithaupt; Anthony Vanderburgh
- Country of origin: Canada
- Original language: English
- No. of seasons: 4
- No. of episodes: 93 (list of episodes)

Production
- Executive producers: Scott Dyer; Doug Murphy; Tom McGillis; Jennifer Pertsch; George Elliott (seasons 3–4); Brian Irving (seasons 3–4)
- Producer: Tom McGillis (season 1)
- Running time: 22 minutes
- Production companies: Nelvana Limited; Fresh TV (seasons 3–4)

Original release
- Network: Teletoon
- Release: November 7, 2004 – February 11, 2010

Related
- Total Drama; Stoked

6teen is a Canadian Flash animated teen comedy drama television series created by Jennifer Pertsch and Tom McGillis which originally aired for four seasons and 93 episodes on Teletoon from November 7, 2004, until February 11, 2010.

Majority-directed by Karen Lessman and co-produced by Nelvana Limited and Fresh TV for two seasons each, it also aired in the U.S. on Nickelodeon from December 18, 2005, to May 13, 2006, and on Cartoon Network (along with Total Drama Island and Stoked) from October 23, 2008, until June 21, 2010. Nelvana produced 78 of the overall 93 episodes and two 45-minute television specials.

As of February 2023, the series is available in various compilation bundles on YouTube. It can also currently be streamed on Tubi.

== Plot ==
6teen is an animated comedy that delves into the themes of friendship, personal growth, self-discovery, and the challenges of being a teenager. Set in the Galleria Mall, a fictional large shopping mall based on the Toronto Eaton Centre and the West Edmonton Mall, the show revolves around the lives of six sixteen-year-old friends who work on part-time jobs at different stores within the mall. The main characters, Jude, Caitlin, Jonesy, Nikki, Jen, and Wyatt, face various adventures while dealing with typical teenage issues, such as crushes, relationships, friendships, school and jobs. The group frequently hangs out at the mall's central food court, where they share their experiences, provide support to one another, and engage in banter.

== Production and reunion ==
The show's creators, Tom McGillis and Jennifer Pertsch, researched by taking the writers to visit the Toronto Eaton Centre to observe teens hanging out in there. They have also observed multiple students in their classrooms and homes. According to its research, preteen-aged children watched adult-targeted sitcoms on the basis of their smart writing, fast-paced dialogue and various plot lines. The working title of the show was The Mall in reference to shopping and teenage antics at the Toronto Eaton Centre.

Among the team of writers and directors for the show include Seán Cullen (The Seán Cullen Show), George Westerholm (This Hour Has 22 Minutes), Gary Hurst, Alice Prodanou and Hugh Duffy. The series' main characters were designed by Brad Coombs and the music was composed by Donald "Don" Breithaupt and Anthony Vanderburgh.

The show was produced with a then newly implemented hybrid-2D-computer animation animation software called "Opus" through a development partnership between Teletoon, Nelvana and Montreal-based acclaimed animation software company Toon Boom Animation.

An acoustic version of the theme music by Brian Melo is included in the show's final episode, "Bye Bye Nikki?".

A special reunion public service announcement titled "Vote, Dude!" was released on YouTube on September 12, 2018, with the original voice cast reprising their respective roles to raise awareness for voting in the 2018 US midterm elections.

== Characters ==
From left to right: Jen, Caitlin, Jude, Wyatt, Nikki, and Jonesy.

- Brooke D'Orsay as Caitlin Cooke: A peppy, spoiled, blonde-haired English Canadian girl with a love for fashion and shopping. She is the newest member of the group, which she joined after she started working at The Big Squeeze lemonade stand in order to pay off the debt she accrued on her father's credit card.
- Megan Fahlenbock as Jennifer "Jen" Masterson: A responsible, athletic Irish Canadian girl who is the tomboy of the group. Her mother married Jonesy's father, reluctantly making the pair step-siblings. Jen also has a controlling side and often pushes herself into other people's business.
- Terry McGurrin as Jonesy Garcia: A laid-back, flirtatious Latin American Canadian boy who is in a relationship with Nikki Wong for most of the series. He picks on Jen Masterson and calls her "step-sis" because his father eventually marries Jen's mother. As a running gag, he gets fired from a new job at a store in almost every episode.
- Stacey DePass as Nicole "Nikki" Wong: A rebellious, no-nonsense Chinese Canadian tomboy with a quick, sarcastic wit who is in a relationship with Jonesy Garcia for most of the series. A younger version of Nikki made a cameo appearance in the second episode of Total DramaRama (similar to Jude's age), titled "Duck Duck Juice".
- Christian Potenza as Jude Lizowski: A fun-loving, easy-going Jewish Canadian boy with a knack for extreme sports, over-the-top comportment and pranks, who works various jobs throughout the series, his first one being the sole employee of a skewer restaurant in the mall. A younger version of Jude is featured in the Total Drama spin-off, Total DramaRama.
- Jess Mal Gibbons as Wyatt Williams: A sensitive, music-loving Black Canadian boy with a caffeine addiction. He initially works in a music store and has a brief romantic relationship with his boss, Serena, who later fires him after he's unable to handle being rejected by her, leading him to work at a video rental store and then for the rest of the series a burger restaurant in the food court. He fancies himself as being somewhat more mature than his friends and is often portrayed as the most responsible of the group, along with Jen.

== Episodes ==
Season	Episodes	Originally released	
Season	Episodes	First released	Last released
1	27	November 7, 2004	June 22, 2005
2	27	November 2, 2005	December 21, 2006
3	26	September 5, 2007	April 25, 2008
4	13	September 10, 2009	February 11, 2010
Webisode		September 12, 2018	

== Home media ==
In Canada, 52 episodes have been released on DVD. The first 13 episodes of the first season were released in a DVD box set titled 6teen: The Complete First Season on November 13, 2007; however, the episodes on the DVD are not in the same order in which they aired. In the United States, 6teen: Season 1 Volume 1, 6teen: Dude of the Living Dead, and 6teen: Deck the Mall were released in 2009. iTunes releases have been made in both Canada and the United States, and many episodes of the series are available on Nelvana's YouTube channel, Retro Rerun.

== Reception and honours ==
The show received generally positive reviews. Alex Kucharski of The Toronto Star described the show as a "funny, exciting new teen comedy-drama", though he criticized some of the elements of the show as "unrealistic".

In the winter/spring season of 2005, 6teen ranked among Teletoon's Top 10 for children aged 10+ in both English and French markets, and was also the only Canadian production to be nominated for that year's Italian "TV Series for All Audiences" Pulcinella Award. Furthermore, it received an award from the Alliance for Children and Television for being the best of children's television to fall under the 9–14 age group on June 2, 2007. Carole Bonneau, the then-vice-president of programming at Teletoon, has remarked about the show:

Aesthetically appealing, with an upbeat musical score, combined with its power to invite empathy from teens towards the main characters, with 6teen Teletoon delivers a series that is a perfect match for today's generation.

Locally, the show garnered about 2.5 million viewers each episode and about 1.8 million viewers each episode on Cartoon Network in the United States. It soon became one of the network's top shows between October 2008 and September 2009 with the steady increase in ratings up to its peak of 3.7 million viewers on June 11, 2009, following the season premiere of Total Drama Action. As time went on, starting in October 2009, the show declined in ratings falling to its lowest rating at 1.6 million viewers for its June 21, 2010 series finale.

In 2009, the show won the Daytime Emmy for Outstanding Original Song (Main Title and Promo) for its theme song which was performed by Phil Naro.

== U.S. broadcast censorship ==
Due to the show being a teen sitcom, 24 out of the 93 produced episodes were considered too risqué or inappropriate for younger children by its American broadcasters Cartoon Network and Nickelodeon, leading to either their censorship or removals. With the legalization of same-sex marriage in Canada occurring in 2005, many of its episodes included references and innuendos to homosexuality, most of which were censored in the U.S. Other censorships and bans in the U.S. included a plot line that focused on shoplifting and nude images that were modified from the series' original blur-out to a full black bar.
