= Fresh TV =

Canadian production company

Fresh TV Inc.
- Logo used since 2016
- Industry: Entertainment
- Founded: 2004; 22 years ago
- Headquarters: 237 Wallace Avenue; Toronto, Ontario; M6H 1V5
- Key people: Tom McGillis; Jennifer Pertsch; Brian Irving; George Elliott
- Products: Full-service production, development, financing, distribution
- Brands: Total Drama; Lucas the Spider
- Number of employees: 100+
- Divisions: Elliott Animation
- Website: freshtvinc.com

Fresh TV Inc. (formerly Fresh Animation) is a Canadian production company specializing in family entertainment aimed at preteens and teenagers, headquartered in Toronto, Ontario. Shows that have been broadcast internationally include Stoked, 6teen, and the Total Drama franchise. They expanded their focus to include live-action, with My Babysitter's a Vampire, Really Me, and Backstage.

Fresh TV's sister company, Elliott Animation Inc., is an internationally recognized 2D and 3D animation studio based in Toronto.

== Productions ==
- Total Drama (2007–present)
- 6teen (2007–10) (co-production with Nelvana) (seasons 3–4)
- Stoked (2009–13)
- My Babysitter's a Vampire (2010)
- My Babysitter's a Vampire (2011–12)
- Really Me (2011–13)
- Grojband (2013–15)
- Bunks (2013)
- Total Drama Presents: The Ridonculous Race (2015)
- Looped (2016)
- Backstage (2016–17)
- Total DramaRama (2018–23)
- Lucas the Spider (2021–23)
