= Brian Irving =

Canadian screenwriter and filmmaker

Brian Irving is a Canadian screenwriter and filmmaker. One of the founders of Fresh TV. As an executive producer and producer his past projects include Sabrina the Teenage Witch starring Melissa Joan Hart, Total Drama, Stoked, My Babysitter's a Vampire, Really Me, Bunks and Backstage. As a screenwriter and story editor his films include Sabrina The Teenage Witch, Redline, Deadly Past, Vampire Hunter "D", Rats and Sabotage.

Brian was the business partner of the children's book author and illustrator, Dayal Kaur Khalsa. He started his career in the arts while still a teenager and later created a number of arts focused businesses.
