= Tom McGillis =

Canadian producer and screenwriter

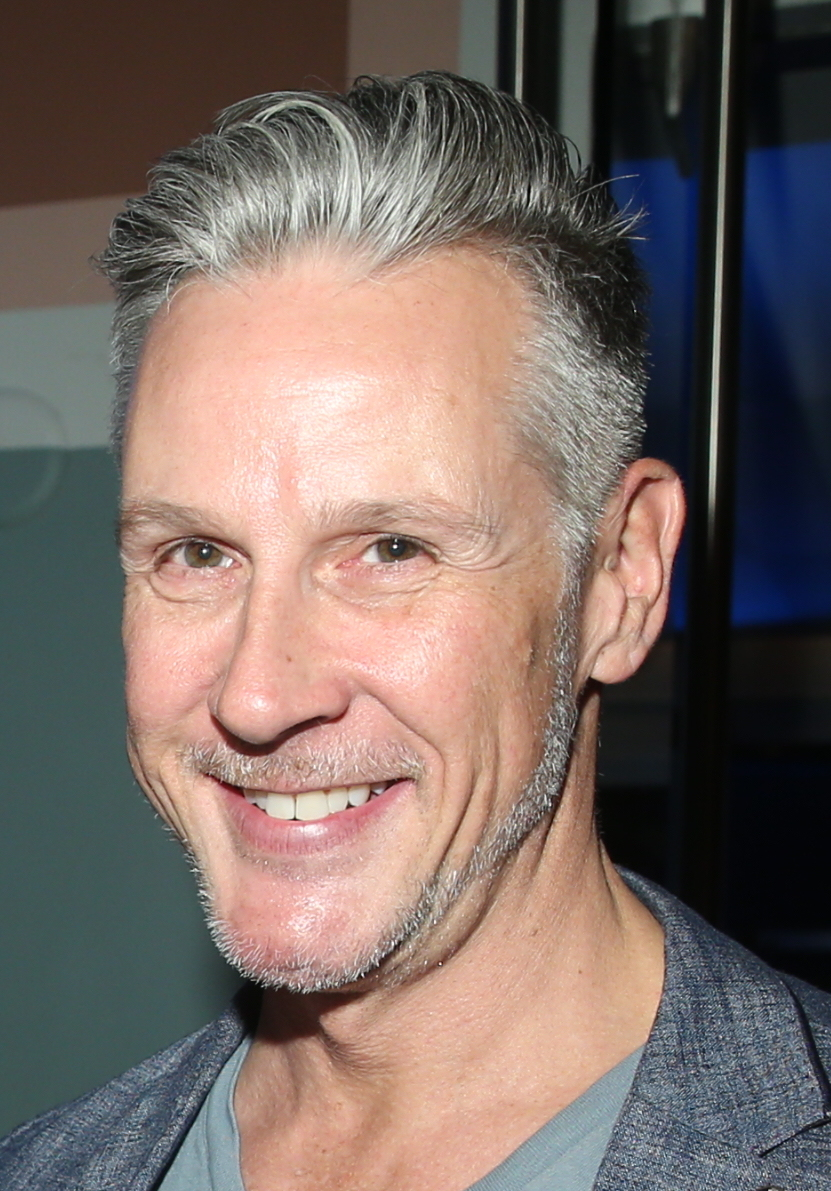
McGillis at a 2018 CFC event in Los Angeles

Tom McGillis is a Canadian writer, producer, and the president of Fresh TV Inc.

== Early life ==
McGillis was born to Marguerite (née Hogg) and Donald McGillis.

== Career ==
Along with partner Jennifer Pertsch, he was the creator and executive producer of the animated series 6teen, Total Drama, and its first spin-off series Total Drama Presents: The Ridonculous Race, Stoked, and non-animated show My Babysitter's a Vampire. He is also one of the executive producers of Stoked and Grojband.

== Awards ==
In 2007, 6teen won the Alliance for Children and Television's "Award of Excellence, Animation" for programming for children, ages 9–14, then, in 2008, McGillis and his team received a Gemini Award nomination for best animated program or series for Total Drama Island.

== Personal life ==
McGillis is openly gay.
