= Jennifer Pertsch =

Canadian television producer (born 1972)

Jennifer Pertsch (born 1976) is a Canadian writer, producer, and one of the founding partners of Fresh TV, a production studio specializing in teen and family oriented television projects. She began her career as a writer for Nelvana Ltd., before moving to Fresh TV. She co-created and executive-produced 6teen, Stoked, Total Drama Island, Total Drama Action, and Total Drama World Tour.

== Early life ==
Pertsch was born to Caroline and Eric Pertsch in 1976.

== Awards ==
In 2007, 6teen was awarded the Alliance for Children and Television's "Award of Excellence, Animation" for programming for children, ages 9–14. She has received an Emmy Award for her writing on the award-winning series Rolie Polie Olie, and a Gemini Award nomination for best animated program or series for Total Drama Island. Total Drama Island has also won Youth Media AlLiance Awards.
