= List of Total Drama characters =

Total Drama is a Canadian animated comedy television series that began airing on Teletoon in 2007 in Canada and on Cartoon Network in 2008 in the United States. The first season, titled Total Drama Island, follows twenty-two contestants on a reality show of the same name. A second season, titled Total Drama Action, began airing in 2009, this time following fourteen (later fifteen) returning contestants. The third season, Total Drama World Tour, began in June 2010, and follows fifteen returning contestants along with two (later three) new contestants. The show's fourth season, Total Drama: Revenge of the Island, began airing in 2012, and was the first season to feature an entirely new set of contestants. The fifth season began airing in 2014, and was split into two parts, Total Drama All-Stars and Total Drama: Pahkitew Island. The first part features contestants from the first four seasons, while the second part introduces new contestants. The sixth season, the 2023 revival, introduced new contestants, completely retiring all previous casts from the show.

A spin-off, titled Total Drama Presents: The Ridonculous Race, began airing on Cartoon Network Canada, in 2016. Like the original series, it follows contestants of a reality game show, The Ridonculous Race. Four contestants from Total Drama compete in the spin-off, while three other characters make silent cameos. Another spin-off series, titled Total DramaRama, premiered in September 2018. It features several returning characters from Total Drama and one character from 6teen which includes seven males (Cody, Duncan, Harold, Jude, Lightning, Noah, and Owen) and seven females (Beth, Bridgette, Courtney, Gwen, Izzy, Leshawna, and Sugar). Other characters, such as DJ, Geoff, Katie, Sadie, and Trent, were shown as background characters.

== Cast ==
This voice actor is credited for their appearance.
This voice actor is not credited for their appearance.

Voice actor	Total Drama						Total Drama Presents: The Ridonculous Race	Total DramaRama		
Voice actor	Island	Action	World Tour	Revenge of the Island	All-Stars Pahkitew Island	Island (2023)	Total Drama Presents: The Ridonculous Race	Season 1	Season 2	Season 3
Emilie-Claire Barlow	Courtney	Courtney	Courtney		Courtney		Ellody Laurie	Courtney	Courtney	Courtney
Clé Bennett	Chef Hatchet DJ	Chef Hatchet DJ Mama	Chef Hatchet DJ	Chef Hatchet DJ	Beardo Chef Hatchet Leonard		Leonard			
Julia Chantrey	Eva	Eva	Eva							
Katie Crown	Izzy	Izzy	Izzy	Izzy	Izzy			Izzy	Izzy	Izzy
Novie Edwards	Leshawna	Leshaniqua Leshawna	Leshawna							
Megan Fahlenbock	Gwen	Gwen	Gwen	Gwen	Gwen			Old Gwen		
Kristin Fairlie	Bridgette	Bridgette Kelsey	Bridgette	Bridgette			Carrie	Bridgette	Bridgette	Bridgette
Brian Froud	Harold	Harold	Harold	Sam	Sam The killer					
Sarah Gadon	Beth	Beth Ginger Tourist	Beth					Beth	Beth	Beth
Carter Hayden	Noah	Noah	Noah				Ennui Noah Spud			
Lauren Lipson	Sadie Owen's mother	Sadie Owen's mother	Sadie							
Scott McCord	Owen Trent The killer	Owen Trent	Owen Trent	Owen	Owen	Owen	Brody Jacques Owen	Owen	Owen	Owen
Stephanie Anne Mills	Katie Lindsay	Katie Lindsay	Katie Lindsay	Lindsay	Lindsay		Kitty			
Drew Nelson	Duncan	Duncan	Duncan	Duncan	Duncan			Duncan	Duncan	Duncan
Peter Oldring	Cody Ezekiel Tyler	Cody Ezekiel Tyler	Cody Ezekiel Tyler		Ezekiel					
Dan Petronijevic	Geoff	Brady Geoff	Geoff				Geoff			
Christian Potenza	Chris McLean	Chris McLean	Chris McLean Jerd McLean	Chris McLean	Chris McLean			Jude Lizowski	Jude Lizowski	Jude Lizowski Chris McLean
Adam Reid	Justin	Gordon Justin	Justin							
Rachel Wilson	Heather	Heather	Heather	Heather	Heather					
Carla Collins		Blaineley	Blaineley							
Marco Grazzini		Alejandro	Alejandro							
Dwayne Hill		Josh	None^{1}						Josh	
Annick Obonsawin		Sierra	Sierra		Sierra					
Carleigh Beverly				Dakota						
Jon Cor				Brick						
Cory Doran				Mike	Mike			Noah	Noah	Noah
Kevin Duhaney				Cameron Cameron's mother	Cameron					
Laurie Elliott				Jo	Jo					
Athena Karkanis				Anne Maria						
Barbara Mamabolo				Zoey	Zoey	Millie				
Caitlynne Medrek				Dawn						
Ashley Peters				Staci						
Tyrone Savage				Lightning	Lightning					
James Wallis				Scott	Scott					
Zachary Bennett					Shawn					
Katie Bergin					Jasmine					
Daniel DeSanto					Dave					
Bruce Dow					Max					
Kristi Friday					Scarlett					
Alex House					Alejandro Jose					
Christopher Jacot					Topher					
Bryn McAuley					Amy Samey		Taylor			
Sunday Muse					Ella				Ella	
Sarah Podemski					Sky					
Ian Ronningen					Rodney					
Rochelle Wilson					Sugar					Sugar
Kwaku Adu-Poku						Caleb				Lightning
Tamara Almeida						Axel				
Brandon Michael Arrington						Bowie				
Eman Ayaz						Priya				
Jack Copland						Wayne				
Julius Cho						Chase				
Gerardo Gismondi						Zee				
Fred Kennedy						Ripper				
Melanie Leishman						Emma				
Daniel Keith Morrison						Damien				
Varun Saranga						Raj				
Julie Sype						Julia				
Tymika Tafari						Nichelle				
Kimberly-Ann Truong						MK				
Ashley Botting							Jen			
Nicki Burke							Stephanie Tammy		Abs	Abs
Neil Crone	Duncan's father						Dwayne			
Stacey DePass							Crimson Emma	Fire Chief Blaze		Janet "Jaws" Janetti
Carlos Díaz							Lorenzo Rock			
Jacob Ewaniuk							Junior			
Darren Frost							Chet	Harold	Harold	Harold
Katie Griffin						Scary Girl	Mary Miles	Duncan's mother	Beth's mother	
Jeff Geddis							Devin Tom			
David Huband							Gerry			
Julie Lemieux	Heather's mother						Josee Kelly	Flo	Mod	
Terry McGurrin						Chris McLean	Don	Colonel McColonelson Don		
Joseph Motiki							Ryan			
Evany Rosen							MacArthur	MacArthur	MacArthur	MacArthur
Lyon Smith							Jay Mickey	Duncan's father		
Nicole Stamp							Sanders			
Adrian Truss							Pete			
Deven Mack						Chef Hatchet		Chef Hatchet	Chef Hatchet	Chef Hatchet
Bahia Watson								Leshawna	Leshawna	Leshawna
Lilly Bartlam								Gwen	Gwen	Gwen
Wyatt White								Cody	Cody	Cody
Tristan Mammitzsch									Max	
Guest cast
Keith Oliver			Alejandro (Robot Suit)							

^1 Despite his character, Josh, not appearing, Dwayne Hill is still credited at the end of Total Drama World Tour.

== Characters ==
=== Hosts ===
- Chris McLean (voiced by Christian Potenza and later Terry McGurrin from season 6 onward, as well as Jose Estrada in outside content) is the Scottish Canadian host of the main Total Drama series.
- Chef Hatchet (voiced by Clé Bennett and later Deven Mack in Total DramaRama and season 6) is the Black Canadian chef for the Total Drama series, and the occasional co-host.
- Mildred "Blaineley" Stacey Andrews O'Halloran (voiced by Carla Collins) is the host from Celebrity Manhunt before moving to Total Drama Aftermath and she was briefly a contestant on Total Drama World Tour. She frequently clashed with Bridgette and Geoff as she attempted to incite drama in their relationship, leading Geoff to trick Blaineley into winning the "Second Chance" challenge to become a contestant on Total Drama World Tour. She is voted off alongside Courtney when it is revealed she attempted to make a secret alliance with Chef to help her win (both were eliminated and did not have a tiebreaker challenge due to budget cuts on the show), after which she reveals that she was supposed to be the host of Total Drama, but Chris became the host because she turned down the job.
- Don (voiced by Terry McGurrin) is the host of The Ridonculous Race.

=== Contestants ===
==== Debuted in Total Drama Island ====
- Beth (voiced by Sarah Gadon) is a contestant on Total Drama Island and Total Drama Action. She is a geeky but friendly girl who tends to get along with everybody due to her amiable behavior. She initially forms an alliance with Heather and Lindsay in Island before leaving due to Heather's bossy behavior, but remains close friends with Lindsay.
- Bridgette (voiced by Kristin Fairlie) is a contestant on Total Drama Island, Total Drama Action, and Total Drama World Tour. She is a surfer chick and a vegetarian who is passionate about tending to animals. She eventually begins dating Geoff and the two cohost Total Drama Aftermath after their early eliminations in Action.
- Cody Emmett Jameson Anderson (voiced by Peter Oldring and later Wyatt White on Total DramaRama) is a contestant on Total Drama Island and Total Drama World Tour. He is a geek who tries to be cool but fails constantly. He develops a crush on Gwen, but ends up helping Trent bond with her after seeing she's more interested in him. In World Tour, he's forced to put up with Sierra, who is his biggest fan and is smitten over him.
- Courtney (voiced by Emilie-Claire Barlow) is a contestant on Total Drama Island, Total Drama Action, Total Drama World Tour, and Total Drama All-Stars. She is stubborn, highly uptight, and very strict, often trying to commandeer her team to no avail. She initially did not qualify for Action but managed to get in by suing the show, becoming the main antagonist of the season. She and Duncan developed a romance in the first season, but the two broke up after her uptight behavior and Duncan's feelings for Gwen led him to cheat on her. She briefly dated Scott in All-Stars, but they later broke up when she lost everyone's trust.
- Devon "DJ" Joseph (voiced by Clé Bennett) is a Jamaican Canadian contestant on Total Drama Island, Total Drama Action, and Total Drama World Tour. He is kind and considerate to others, a talented cook, and loves animals and his mother. He was briefly in an alliance with Chef in Action but later decided to quit the competition out of guilt from the advantages the partnership brought him. In World Tour, he was cursed in Egypt to unintentionally harm any animal he came across.
- Duncan (voiced by Drew Nelson) is a contestant on Total Drama Island, Total Drama Action, Total Drama World Tour, and Total Drama All-Stars. He is a rebellious punk and an ex-convict from juvenile detention. He initially dated Courtney in Island, but eventually developed feelings for Gwen in World Tour. In All-Stars his obsession with portraying himself as a bad boy led to Gwen dumping him.
- Eva (voiced by Julia Chantrey) is a contestant on Total Drama Island. She is a strong athlete with a fiery temper.
- Ezekiel (voiced by Peter Oldring) is a contestant on Total Drama Island and Total Drama World Tour. He is a Canadian homeschooled farm boy who makes sexist comments about the female contestants who is the first one eliminated in both seasons he competed in. In World Tour, his obsession with winning drove him to stowing away on the plane, eventually turning him feral and making him an obstacle for contestants that season as well as the subsequent seasons.
- Geoffrey "Geoff" (voiced by Dan Petronijevic) is a contestant on Total Drama Island, Total Drama Action, and The Ridonculous Race. He is a surfer with a positive attitude and is always up for a party. He began dating Bridgette and the two cohosted Total Drama Aftermath. In The Ridonculous Race, he competed with his best friend and fellow surfer enthusiast, Brody.
- Gwen (voiced by Megan Fahlenbock) is a contestant on Total Drama Island, Total Drama Action, Total Drama World Tour, and Total Drama All-Stars. She is a goth girl who does not initially like socializing with others. In the first season, she proves to be a strong rival to Heather and eventually develops a relationship with Trent, but then in Action broke everything; Trent and Gwen are put into different teams, which results with the two break up afterward when the competition and Trent's attempts to appease her prove to be too much. Despite forming a friendship with Courtney in World Tour, she shatters it when she begins dating Duncan. In All-Stars, she breaks up with Duncan while trying to make amends with Courtney, until she learns her true colors.
- Harold Norbert Cheever Doris McGrady V (voiced by Brian Froud) is a contestant on Total Drama Island, Total Drama Action, and Total Drama World Tour. A parody of Napoleon Dynamite, he is an awkward nerd who is constantly bullied by Duncan. He develops feelings for Leshawna and feels the need to constantly prove himself to her.
- Heather (voiced by Rachel Wilson) is a contestant on Total Drama Island, Total Drama Action, Total Drama World Tour, and Total Drama All-Stars. She is a malicious, insolent, and snobby girl who will not stop at anything to win the million-dollar cash prize and acts as the main antagonist during the first season. In the third season, she competes against the equally malicious Alejandro, and despite their competitive drives, eventually begin dating in All-Stars.
- Izzy (voiced by Katie Crown) is a contestant on Total Drama Island, Total Drama Action, and Total Drama World Tour. She is a zany girl who is very hyperactive and a compulsive liar. In both Island and Action, she returns to the competition after early eliminations. She initially dates Owen during the first season, but later breaks up with him in World Tour after suddenly growing smart from a head injury.
- Justin (voiced by Adam Reid) is a model contestant on Total Drama Island and Total Drama Action. He is a handsome boy who makes girls, boys, and animals swoon when he stares into their eyes. He is initially silent in Island, but in Action is much more involved and plays more of an antagonistic role in the first half of the season.
- Katie (voiced by Stephanie Anne Mills) is a contestant on Total Drama Island and Sadie's best friend. They dress alike by wearing a black and white striped tube top and pink hot pants, but she is taller and skinnier with a tan.
- Leshawna (voiced by Novie Edwards) is a sassy and bold contestant on Total Drama Island, Total Drama Action, and Total Drama World Tour. She is a curvy African Canadian girl with a particularly large behind. While she generally gets along with the rest of the contestants, particularly with Gwen and Harold, she has a strong rivalry with Heather.
- Lindsay (voiced by Stephanie Anne Mills) is a contestant on Total Drama Island, Total Drama Action, Total Drama World Tour, and Total Drama All-Stars. She is a stereotypical dumb blonde who has a sweet, bubbly personality. She and Beth are initially in an alliance with Heather until the latter's manipulative personality becomes more apparent. She remains close friends with Beth and dates Tyler, but occasionally has issues remembering who he is.
- Noah (voiced by Carter Hayden) is a contestant on Total Drama Island, Total Drama World Tour, and The Ridonculous Race. He is a cynical, sarcastic boy who constantly insults his teammates who relies more on brains than brawn. He develops a friendship with Owen and the two compete on the Ridonculous Race as a team, where he falls in love with Emma of the Sisters team.
- Owen (voiced by Scott McCord) is an overweight bumbling contestant on Total Drama Island, Total Drama Action, Total Drama World Tour, and The Ridonculous Race. Owen is a contestant who loves to eat and has an enthusiastic personality. In Action, Chris brings him back after an early elimination to serve as a mole and sabotage the remaining contestants. He initially dates Izzy before she breaks up with him in World Tour, during which he becomes friends with Noah, who becomes his partner for The Ridonculous Race. The two are known as "Reality TV Pros" as they competed in several reality shows following World Tour.
- Sadie (voiced by Lauren Lipson) is a contestant on Total Drama Island and Katie's best friend. The two dress alike by wearing black and white striped tube tops with pink hot pants and have similar personalities, but Sadie is heavier and shorter with fair skin.
- Trenton "Trent" (voiced by Scott McCord) is a contestant on Total Drama Island and Total Drama Action. He is a guitar player with a laid-back attitude who has a crush on Gwen during the first season. The two begin dating, but their relationship quickly falls apart in Action after they are placed on opposite teams.
- Tyler (voiced by Peter Oldring) is a contestant on Total Drama Island and Total Drama World Tour. He is an uncoordinated athlete who frequently injures himself. He and Lindsay become one of the first couples of the show, but have a hard time maintaining the relationship as Lindsay frequently forgets who he is.

==== Debuted in Total Drama World Tour ====
- Alejandro Burromuerto (Burromuertos in Total Drama All-Stars) (voiced by Marco Grazzini in Total Drama World Tour and Alex House in Total Drama All-Stars^{1}) is a contestant on Total Drama World Tour and Total Drama All-Stars. He is a handsome young Spanish man who is the main antagonist of the third season. He instigated the elimination of nearly every other contestant in the season, either by exploiting his looks or sowing discord among the others. He also talks about his impressive family from time to time (crediting his relatives for the skills he has garnered to this day), but loathes his brother José for being subjectively better than him and for calling him "Al" on purpose (the latter, which Owen does repeatedly since he cannot pronounce "Alejandro"). He creates a long-lasting rivalry with Heather, one of the few people to actually see through his manipulations and actively work against him, but he eventually falls in love with her (although he tries hard not to admit it). Amidst the chaos of the final challenge, he is trampled by the other contestants and burned by lava, forcing Chris to place him inside the robotic "Drama Machine" so he can sign release forms for the incident, and allowing him to recover from his injuries after a year. He returns in All-Stars, where he attempts to warn the other contestants of Mal's evil nature, but is voted off due to the contestants' distrust of him and his heinous actions. After his elimination, he begins dating Heather.
- Sierra (voiced by Annick Obonsawin) is a contestant on Total Drama World Tour and Total Drama All-Stars. A Total Drama fan girl and blogger who has an obsessive crush on Cody. During the third season, she makes multiple attempts to make Cody fall in love with her, leaving him often terrified at her advances. Sierra ultimately places fourth after Chris disqualifies her for accidentally blowing up the plane they were traveling on. She returns in All Stars, where her mind begins to slowly deteriorate and causes her to mistake Cameron for Cody. Cameron convinces his teammates to vote her off for both of their sakes.

==== Debuted in Total Drama: Revenge of the Island ====
- Anne Maria (voiced by Athena Karkanis) is a contestant on Total Drama: Revenge of the Island. She is a New Jersey woman who is obsessed with her looks and is involved in a love triangle with Mike and Zoey, as she is infatuated with Mike's alternate personality, Vito. During the mine challenge, she receives a large diamond from the feral Ezekiel. Thinking she no longer needs the million-dollar cash prize, and not knowing the diamond is worthless, she quits the show.
- Beverly "B" is a contestant on Total Drama: Revenge of the Island. He is an intelligent individual who does not speak. In the second episode, his real name is revealed to be Beverly. He is voted off after Scott throws a challenge for his team and frames B for the loss.
- Brick McArthur (voiced by Jon Cor) is a contestant on Total Drama: Revenge of the Island. He is a military cadet who always follows his creed and forms a rivalry with Jo. Even though he is a disciplined cadet, he often displays a sensitive side that his enemies take advantage of. He is voted off for rescuing the other team during the challenge in the mines.
- Cameron Corduroy Wilkins (voiced by Kevin Duhaney) is a contestant on Total Drama: Revenge of the Island and Total Drama All-Stars. He is an intelligent computer nerd who is physically frail as a result of his mother raising him in a bubble. He eventually makes it to the finale of the fourth season with Lightning. In All-Stars, Cameron becomes the target of Sierra's affections as she begins mistaking him for Cody. During the 100th episode, he is severely injured after he and Gwen rescue the contestants from Ezekiel, resulting in his elimination. He later assists Zoey in the final two with Gwen.
- Dakota Milton (voiced by Carleigh Beverly) is a contestant on Total Drama: Revenge of the Island. She is a fame-hungry girl who is eliminated early in the competition after her desire for camera time costs her team the challenge. She returns to the island to get more screen time, which Chris by making her an intern. After Chris sends her into a mine filled with radiation to test it for the contestants, she mutates into a giant monster that Sam calls "the Dakotazoid". She also began competing again in Anne Maria's place, but was eliminated again immediately when Scott protected himself with the immunity statue. After her elimination, she began dating Sam and started a career as a wrestler.
- Dawn (voiced by Caitlynne Medrek) is an English Canadian contestant on Total Drama: Revenge of the Island. She is a nature lover who is shown to be able to read people's feelings through their aura. She is voted off after Scott frames her for stealing the other contestants' belongings.
- Jo (voiced by Laurie Elliott) is a contestant on Total Drama: Revenge of the Island and Total Drama All-Stars. She is a competitive jock who's willing to go to any lengths to win. She forms intense rivalries with Brick and Lightning and makes multiple alliances along the way to stay in the game before eventually betraying them. Her last alliance with Cameron led to her downfall after he betrays her, something she was proud of. In All-Stars, she is voted off early for her confrontational attitude and costing her team the challenge.
- Rudolph "Lightning" Jackson (voiced by Tyrone Savage) is a jock contestant on Total Drama: Revenge of the Island and Total Drama All-Stars. He is an arrogant athlete who is talented at football and almost always refers to himself in the third person. Despite his lack of intelligence, he makes it to the finale and faces off against Cameron. After being struck by lightning indirectly by Cameron in the final episode, his hair turns white. In the following season, he is eliminated early after his egotistical attitude costs his team the challenge.
- Mike (voiced by Cory Doran) is a contestant on Total Drama: Revenge of the Island and Total Drama All-Stars. Mike is a boy who has multiple personalities: the grumpy old man Chester, Russian gymnast Svetlana, Italian tough guy Vito, Australian adventurer Manitoba Smith, and the hidden evil Mal. In the fourth season, he develops feelings for Zoey, but is afraid to reveal his disorder to her, which Scott takes advantage of to win the go-kart challenge and eliminate him. In All-Stars, his alternate personality, Mal, takes over his body and becomes the main antagonist for the season. Mike and his other personalities work together inside his subconscious to escape and kill Mal by hitting a "reset button" that leaves Mike as the sole personality as he competed in the finale with Zoey.
- Sam (voiced by Brian Froud) is a contestant on Total Drama: Revenge of the Island and Total Drama All-Stars. He is a gamer with a generally optimistic attitude. He develops a crush on Dakota and eventually begins dating her after she mutates from radiation exposure. He is eliminated after his lack of physical strength costs his team the challenge. In All-Stars, he is eliminated after he is caught cheating during the pancake-eating challenge to save food in case he gets sent to Boney Island.
- Scott (voiced by James Wallis) is a contestant on Total Drama: Revenge of the Island and Total Drama All-Stars. Scott is a selfish, sociopathic, scheming farm boy who serves as the main antagonist of the fourth season. He continuously sabotages his own team so he can control who ends up being eliminated. He is also constantly chased by the mutant shark Fang after he lost one of his teeth to Scott, eventually injuring Scott to the point that he needed to heal in a "trauma chair". In All-Stars, Scott develops a relationship with Courtney, but eventually breaks up with her after she depicts him as a rat in her elimination chart. He gets eliminated by Zoey due to her making a promise with Mike to bring him to the finale.
- Staci (voiced by Ashley Peters) is a contestant on Total Drama: Revenge of the Island. She is an extremely talkative girl who is voted off first due to exaggerating about her family and lying about how they invented everything.
- Zoey (voiced by Barbara Mamabolo) is a contestant on Total Drama: Revenge of the Island and Total Drama All-Stars. She is a kind, retro girl from a small town. During the fourth season, she develops feelings for Mike, but finds it difficult to start a relationship due to the latter's attempts to hide his multiple personalities and Anne Maria's crush on Vito. In All-Stars, Zoey is warned by the other contestants about Mal's nature, but does not initially believe them due to their distrustful nature and her relationship with Mike. She makes it to the finale with Mike and eventually helps him overcome Mal's influence.

==== Debuted in Total Drama: Pahkitew Island ====
- Amy (voiced by Bryn McAuley) is a contestant on Total Drama: Pahkitew Island. She is Samey's older twin sister, whom she constantly bullies. When Amy frames Samey for losing one of the team's challenges, Samey convinces the others that she is Amy after Amy eats a poisonous apple and becomes unable to speak. After Amy's elimination, she swims back to the island to get revenge on her sister, resulting in both of their eliminations, and she will be shot out of the cannon again by Chris to avoid the confusion, but this time with Samey. It's unknown how the conflict will continue.
- Beardo (voiced by Clé Bennett) is a contestant on Total Drama: Pahkitew Island. Beardo annoyed the other contestants with his ability to make convincing sound effects, which resulted in him getting voted off first.
- Dave (voiced by Daniel DeSanto) is a contestant on Total Drama: Pahkitew Island. A germophobe who sees himself as the only "normal" contestant on the show, Dave thinks logically about challenges but is very critical of his teammates. He develops a crush on Sky, but when she rejects his advances, he convinces the other contestants to vote him off. He becomes Sky's teammate in the finale, but turns against her after finding out she was dating someone before coming on the show. He tries to win the one million cash prize in order to burn it in front of her as revenge, but fails. At the end of the episode, he is accidentally abandoned on the island by Chris and the other contestants and is forced to face the scuba bear 3.0 again. It's unknown what happened to him after the show ended.
- Ella (voiced by Sunday Muse) is a contestant on Total Drama: Pahkitew Island. A parody of Disney's Snow White, Ella is a girl who loves singing and gets along with animals. After Chris threatens to eliminate her if she sings any further, Sugar convinces her to sing to help her teammates during a challenge before sending Chris an anonymous tip to get her eliminated.
- Jasmine (voiced by Katie Bergin) is a contestant on Total Drama: Pahkitew Island. Jasmine is a tall Australian survivalist who is very outgoing and intimidating, but also cares a lot about her teammates and her crush, Shawn. She makes it to the final four, but is eliminated after Sugar sabotages her during the challenge. In the finale, Chris turns her against Shawn by revealing how he did not want to split the prize money with her, but the two can reconcile regardless of whether Shawn ends up winning or not.
- Leonard (voiced by Clé Bennett) is a contestant on Total Drama: Pahkitew Island and The Ridonculous Race. A lover of Live Action Role Playing Games, he dresses as a wizard and believes he has magical abilities, which result in early eliminations on both of the shows he competed on.
- Maximillian "Max" (voiced by Bruce Dow) is a contestant on Total Drama: Pahkitew Island. He is an aspiring supervillain who is constantly scheming, but in actuality is very incompetent. He sees Scarlett as his evil assistant, greatly annoying her in the process.
- Rodney (voiced by Ian Ronningen) is a contestant on Total Drama: Pahkitew Island. Rodney is a kind and caring country boy who constantly falls in love with any girl for the simplest of gestures. He is eventually voted off when his crushes on multiple contestants causes his team to lose a truth-or-dare challenge.
- Samantha "Samey" (voiced by Bryn McAuley) is a contestant on Total Drama: Pahkitew Island. She is the younger twin sister and polar opposite of Amy. Samey is very kind but timid due to the constant abuse from her sister. She prefers to be called Sammy, but Amy gets everyone to refer to her as Samey, as she is the younger twin. Samey gets revenge on her sister by tricking Amy into eating a poisonous apple that makes her unable to talk, allowing her to deceive the others into thinking she is Amy. She pretends to be Amy to remain in the competition before the real Amy returns to the island for revenge, resulting in both of their eliminations, and she will be shot out of the cannon by Chris to avoid the confusion, but this time with Amy. It's unknown how the conflict will continue.
- Scarlett (voiced by Kristi Friday) is a contestant on Total Drama: Pahkitew Island. She is a quiet, highly intelligent girl who helps out Max with his "evil" doings, much to her ire. When she finds the control room for the island, she is revealed to be twisted and psychotic and threatens Chris and the other contestants' lives to get the prize money, but she is defeated and eliminated shortly afterwards.
- Shawn (voiced by Zachary Bennett) is a contestant on Total Drama: Pahkitew Island. A firm believer in zombie apocalypse conspiracy theories, Shawn believes he is constantly on the run from zombies. He has a crush on Jasmine, but his fear of zombies often gets in the way of their relationship. He eventually makes it to the finale with Sky.
- Sky (voiced by Sarah Podemski) is a contestant on Total Drama: Pahkitew Island. An aspiring Olympic gymnast, Sky tries to concentrate solely on winning the million dollars, but is often distracted by Dave. She eventually makes it to the finale with Shawn.
- Sugar (voiced by Rochelle Wilson) is a contestant on Total Drama: Pahkitew Island. A parody of Honey Boo Boo, Sugar is an unintelligent yet fearless pageant lover with disgusting habits. She develops an intense hatred for Ella despite the latter wanting to become friends with her. Sugar then tricks Sky into forming an alliance with her, when she actually wants Sky out of the game, but it backfired. After making it to the final three, she is eliminated after performing the worst in her talent show challenge.
- Topher (voiced by Christopher Jacot) is a contestant on Total Drama: Pahkitew Island. A huge fan of the show's host, Topher, is often more focused on becoming the new Chris than on the challenges. He eventually steals Chris' phone and attempts to convince the show's producers (later revealed to be Chris playing a trick on Topher) to allow him to replace Chris, eventually costing his team the challenge.

==== Debuted in The Ridonculous Race ====
- Brody (voiced by Scott McCord) is a contestant on The Ridonculous Race. He competed with Geoff as the "Surfer Dudes" team. At the beginning of the race, he did not take the race seriously, but started to after he and Geoff returned after being previously eliminated. He also develops a crush on MacArthur, one that she reciprocates over time but does not act on due to the competition.
- Carrie and Devin (voiced by Kristin Fairlie and Jeff Geddis) are contestants on The Ridonculous Race. They compete as the "Best Friends" team. At the beginning of the season, they are best friends. However, it is quickly revealed that Carrie has been in love with Devin since the third grade, but Devin has a girlfriend named Shelley. After Shelley breaks up with him, Devin realizes he loves Carrie after going through the five stages of grief, but at this point, she has given up hope of ever being with him. Eventually, they confess their feelings and begin to date, only for Devin to suffer a freak accident that seriously injures him, forcing them to quit the race. They chose the "Surfer Dudes" team to take their place in the race.
- Chet and Lorenzo (voiced by Darren Frost and Carlos Díaz) are contestants on The Ridonculous Race. They compete as the "Stepbrothers" team. Before the race, Chet's mother married Lorenzo's father, and the two have hated each other since then. In an attempt to get them to get along better, the parents forced Chet and Lorenzo to join the race. During the competition, they begin to form a close bond as they realize they have similar interests.
- Crimson and Ennui (voiced by Stacey DePass and Carter Hayden) are contestants on The Ridonculous Race. They compete as the "Goths" team. Despite their apathy for everything, especially the competition, they prove to be a competent team. While in Australia, they adopt a bunny and name him Loki. After Loki is stolen by the "Ice Dancers" team, the "Goths" are eliminated while trying to look for him.
- Dwayne and Junior (voiced by Neil Crone and Jacob Ewaniuk) are contestants on The Ridonculous Race. They compete as the "Father & Son" team. Dwayne is a middle-aged man who is desperately trying to please his son by acting cool and younger than he is. Junior is usually embarrassed by his father's antics and clumsiness. Despite Dwayne often failing to impress his son, they end up closer as the race progresses, with Junior appreciating his father's attempts.
- Ellody and Mary (voiced by Emilie-Claire Barlow and Katie Griffin) are contestants on The Ridonculous Race. They compete as the "Geniuses" team. During the race, they often let their need to plan slow them down, which eventually results in their elimination during a sandcastle challenge.
- Emma and Kitty (voiced by Stacey DePass and Stephanie Anne Mills) are contestants on The Ridonculous Race. They compete as the "Sisters" team. Emma is a no-nonsense, competitive law student who is distrustful of others after her last relationship, while Kitty is cheerful and carefree. During the race, Emma falls in love with Noah, with both of their respective teammates helping to push their relationship forward, despite it causing some setbacks for both of their teams.
- Gerry and Pete (voiced by David Huband and Adrian Truss) are contestants on The Ridonculous Race. They compete as the "Tennis Rivals" team. They are two retired professional tennis players who had a fierce rivalry during their competition days and decided to compete in the race so they could finally get along.
- Jacques and Josee (voiced by Scott McCord and Julie Lemieux) are contestants on The Ridonculous Race. They compete as the "Ice Dancers" team. They are two highly competitive Canadian figure skaters who hate to finish anything other than first place after embarrassing themselves at the Winter Olympics. They become the main antagonists as they typically resort to sabotaging the other contestants in a desperate attempt to claim first place, especially during the later parts of the season.
- Jay and Mickey (both voiced by Lyon Smith) are contestants on The Ridonculous Race. They compete as the "Adversity Twins" team. They are a pair of frail identical twins who were born with many different allergies, phobias, and disorders on top of the terrible luck they tend to have.
- Jennifer "Jen" and Thomas "Tom" (voiced by Ashley Botting and Jeff Geddis) are contestants on The Ridonculous Race. They compete as the "Fashion Bloggers" team. As best friends, the two developed a very popular fashion blog and are always looking for new styles to try and promote. During the race, they get into an argument over who truly started the blog, but they eventually resolve their differences before they are eliminated. They also appear as the producers in Total DramaRama episode "A Bridgette Too Far", where Tom is shown playing with paddle ball, and Jen is online shopping as part of the relaxation.
- Kelly and Taylor (voiced by Julie Lemieux and Bryn McAuley) are contestants on The Ridonculous Race. They compete as the "Mother & Daughter" team. Hailing from a rich family, Kelly is a trophy wife who is desperately clinging to her youth in a bid to appease her daughter. Taylor, who is rude and disrespectful towards her mother, believes she is a strong athlete as a result of being given many fake awards growing up. Kelly eventually takes Dwayne's advice and starts being stricter towards her daughter.
- Laurie and Miles (voiced by Emilie-Claire Barlow and Katie Griffin) are contestants on The Ridonculous Race. They compete as the "Vegans" team. Much to their dismay, they end up being forced to eat meat during the Iceland leg of the race. Laurie attacks Don after being told that the leg turned out to be a non-elimination leg, the resulting karma leading to their elimination in the next episode.
- Rock and Spud (voiced by Carlos Díaz and Carter Hayden) are contestants on The Ridonculous Race. They compete as the "Rockers" team. Between the two, Spud is significantly more dim-witted and has a slower reaction time, leaving Rock to put in more of the work.
- Ryan and Stephanie (voiced by Joseph Motiki and Nicki Burke) are contestants on The Ridonculous Race. They compete as the "Daters" team. Despite their initial strong passion, they grow to detest each other as the race goes on and break up, eventually calling themselves the "Haters" team. Near the end of the race, they make up and become a couple again.
- Sanders and Valentina "MacArthur" Escobar (voiced by Nicole Stamp and Evany Rosen) are contestants on The Ridonculous Race. They compete as the "Police Cadets" team. Between the two, MacArthur is much more aggressive, while Sanders is often the voice of reason. After MacArthur accidentally breaks Sanders' arm during one of the challenges and nearly costs them the race, she begins letting Sanders take charge more often. They form an aggressive rivalry with the "Ice Dancers" team and manage to eliminate them in the finale.
- Tammy (voiced by Nicki Burke) is a contestant on The Ridonculous Race. She is Leonard's childhood friend and competed with him as the "LARPERs" team.

==== Debuted in Total Drama Island (2023) ====
- Axel (voiced by Tamara Almeida) is a contestant on Total Drama Island (2023). Axel is a serious survivalist and combat expert preparing for a hypothetical zombie apocalypse.
- Bowie (voiced by Brandon Arrington) is a contestant on Total Drama Island (2023). Bowie is Total Drama's first openly gay contestant and is incredibly competitive and strategic.
- Caleb (voiced by Kwaku Adu-Poku) is a contestant on Total Drama Island (2023). He is a gorgeous hunk who can make even animals fawn over him.
- Chase (voiced by Julius Cho) is a contestant on Total Drama Island (2023). Chase is part of a livestream with two of his friends and his on-again-off-again girlfriend, Emma.
- Damien (voiced by Daniel Keith Morrison) is a contestant on Total Drama Island (2023). Damien is fun, supportive, intelligent, scientifically knowledgeable, and cares for his friends.
- Emma (voiced by Melanie Leishman) is a contestant on Total Drama Island (2023). Emma was originally Chase's girlfriend and part of his livestream until his careless nature, selfishness, and lack of empathy caused her to break up with him.
- Julia (voiced by Julie Sype) is a contestant on Total Drama Island (2023). Julia is a social media influencer who hides her selfish, temperamental personality with a peaceful, positive online persona.
- Millie (voiced by Barbara Mamabolo) is a contestant on Total Drama Island (2023). Millie is a researcher and writer who is studying how the mindset of her generation has taken a turn for the worse compared to her parents' generation.
- Mary Kate "MK" (voiced by Kimberly-Ann Truong) is a contestant on Total Drama Island (2023). MK is a minor thief who likes working behind the scenes by using contestants' personal information to her advantage, even if it means going too far.
- Nichelle LaDonna (voiced by Tymika Tafari) is a contestant on Total Drama Island (2023). Nichelle is a film and TV star who is overly confident in her physical skills, even though all her stunts were performed by stuntpeople.
- Priya (voiced by Eman Ayaz) is a contestant on Total Drama Island (2023). Priya's parents have trained her since birth to compete on Total Drama, but she dreams of becoming a doctor.
- Rajesh "Raj" (voiced by Varun Saranga) is a contestant on Total Drama Island (2023). Raj is Wayne's best friend and fellow hockey teammate from Northern Alberta, Canada.
- Stefano "Ripper" (voiced by Fred Kennedy) is a contestant on Total Drama Island (2023). Ripper is described as a jerk who does not care what anyone thinks and is the blend of all of the worst personality traits known to man.
- Lauren "Scary Girl" (voiced by Katie Griffin) is a contestant on Total Drama Island (2023). Lauren loves seeing other people hurt or in pain.
- Wayne (voiced by Jack Copland) is a contestant on Total Drama Island (2023). Wayne is Raj's best friend and fellow hockey teammate from Northern Alberta, Canada.
- Hezekias "Zee" (voiced by Gerardo Gismondi) is a contestant on Total Drama Island (2023). Zee is a laid-back, go-with-the-flow, fun dude with a love of orange soda. Zee is also Total Drama's first amputee contestant, having been born without the lower half of his left leg.

=== Placements ===
Character	S1	S2	S3	S4	S5A	S5B	RR	S6A	S6B
Alejandro			1st/2nd		6th				
Amy						12th			
Anne Maria				8th					
Axel								15th	10th
B				12th					
Beardo						14th			
Beth	16th	1st/2nd							
Blaineley			6th/7th						
Bowie								2nd	11th
Brick				9th					
Bridgette	10th	14th/15th	16th						
Brody							1st/2nd		
Caleb								16th	2nd/3rd
Cameron				1st/2nd	7th				
Carrie							5th		
Chase								6th	15th
Chet							11th		
Cody	17th		3rd						
Courtney	14th	4th	6th/7th		5th				
Crimson							7th		
Dakota				7th					
Damien								12th	6th
Dave						7th			
Dawn				11th					
Devin							5th		
DJ	8th	11th	12th						
Duncan	4th	1st/2nd	5th		8th				
Dwayne							9th		
Ella						9th			
Ellody							16th		
Emma (RR)							4th		
Emma (TD)								5th	13th
Ennui							7th		
Eva	12th								
Ezekiel	22nd		18th						
Geoff	6th	14th/15th					1st/2nd		
Gerry							17th		
Gwen	1st/2nd	12th	9th		4th				
Harold	13th	5th	17th						
Heather	3rd	9th	1st/2nd		10th				
Izzy	7th	10th	13th						
Jacques							3rd		
Jasmine						4th			
Jay							12th		
Jen							14th		
Jo				5th	12th				
Josee							3rd		
Julia								4th	2nd/3rd
Junior							9th		
Justin	20th	7th							
Katie	19th								
Kelly							13th		
Kitty							4th		
Laurie							15th		
Leonard						13th	18th		
Leshawna	5th	8th	15th						
Lightning				1st/2nd	13th				
Lindsay	9th	6th	14th		14th				
Lorenzo							11th		
MK								11th	7th
MacArthur							1st/2nd		
Mary							16th		
Max						5th			
Mickey							12th		
Millie								3rd	14th
Mike				6th	1st/2nd				
Miles							15th		
Nichelle								14th	12th
Noah	21st		11th				8th		
Owen	1st/2nd	3rd	8th				8th		
Pete							17th		
Priya								1st	4th
Raj								9th/10th	5th
Ripper								8th	9th
Rock							10th		
Rodney						11th			
Ryan							6th		
Sadie	15th								
Sam				10th	11th				
Samey						10th			
Sanders							1st/2nd		
Scarlett						6th			
Scary Girl								13th	16th
Scott				4th	3rd				
Shawn						1st/2nd			
Sierra			4th		9th				
Sky						1st/2nd			
Spud							10th		
Staci				13th					
Stephanie							6th		
Sugar						3rd			
Tammy							18th		
Taylor							13th		
Tom							14th		
Topher						8th			
Trent	11th	13th							
Tyler	18th		10th						
Wayne								9th/10th	1st
Zee								7th	8th
Zoey				3rd	1st/2nd				
