= Z-Squad =

- Genre: Adventure; Action
- Created by: Enpix+ Nelvana
- Written by: Jin Choi; Chan Kim
- Story by: Jin Choi
- Directed by: Jin Choi
- Voices of: Alyson Court; Ashley Botting; Sunday Muse; Zachary Bennett; Lyon Smith; Tyrone Savage; Emily Claire Barlow; Noah Cappe; Dwayne Hill; Martin Roach; Melissa Altro
- Countries of origin: South Korea; Canada
- Original languages: Korean; English
- No. of episodes: 26

Production
- Executive producers: Jin Choi; Scott Dyer; Doug Murphy
- Producers: Sean V. Jeffrey; Marlene Sharp; Gina Shim
- Running time: 30 minutes
- Production companies: Enemes; Daiwon C&A Holdings; KT; SOVIK; Nelvana
- Budget: $7,000,000

Original release
- Network: SBS
- Release: December 4, 2006 – June 4, 2007

Z-Squad (Korean: 크리스탈요정 지스쿼드, The Fairies of Crystals Z-Squad) is an animated television series created by Enpix+ and Nelvana.

== Plot ==
Z-Squad chronicles the adventures of three ordinary school girls turned super heroines and their newfound, cuddly alien counterparts, the Zoots, as they search for enchanted crystals to save the Earth and Z-Nation from a cast of bumbling baddies. It is aimed at kids aged 6 to 9 and there are 26 x 24-minute episodes available. Girls will cheer the competitive-spirited heroines; boys will back the sarcastic schoolboys called the Drop Dead Gorgeous Three (the DDG3), as well as the powerful Prince Aramis and a wise wizard Woolaf.

== Characters ==
=== Main characters ===
- Chaney (채니; voiced by Chung Misook (정미숙) in the Korean version, and Alyson Court in the English version) is the first member of the Z-Squad with red hair with yellow, pink, and orange streaks that is tied up with two pigtails, white sun visor hat with a yellow trim and a pink star, and red eyes (yellow in the pilot). Her theme colors are red and yellow. She is represented by stars with her alien counterpart, Zora, the red Zoot of Courage.
- Haemi (혜미; voiced by Eun Yeong Seon (은영선) in the Korean version, and Sunday Muse in the English version) is the second member of the Z-Squad with short magenta hair that is tied up in a blue headband with a ribbon, and magenta eyes. Her theme colors are pink and blue. She is represented by hearts with her alien counterpart, Zef, the pink Zoot of Love.
- Jeanie (지니; voiced by Park Youngnam (박영남) in the Korean version, and Ashley Botting in the English version) is the third and final member of the Z-Squad with green hair that is clipped up in a yellow hair clip, and turquoise blue eyes (formerly green in the pilot) with rose round glasses (red in the pilot). Her theme colors are green and yellow. She is represented by four-leaf clovers with her alien counterpart, Zuma, the green Zoot of Hope.

=== Minor characters ===
- Jinu (지누; voiced by Kang Soo-jin (강수진) in the Korean version, and Zachary Bennett in the English version)
- Cal (민; voiced by Kim Youngsun (김영선) in the Korean version, and Tyrone Savage in the English version)
- Tae-o (태오; voiced by Son Jeong Ah (손정아) in the Korean version, and Lyon Smith in the English version)
- Bernice (뚱녀; voiced by Choi Moon-ja (최문자) in the Korean version, and Emilie-Claire Barlow in the English version)
- Aramis (에르메스; voiced by Son Jeong-ah (손정아) in the Korean version, and Noah Cappe in the English version)
- Woolaf (울라프; voiced by Yoo Dong-kyun (유동균) in the Korean version, and Dwayne Hill in the English version)
- Bakoo (벌룬; voiced by Noh Min (노민) in the Korean version, and Martin Roach in the English version)
- Grindel (그린들; voiced by Choi Moon-ja (최문자) in the Korean version, and Melissa Altro in the English version)

== Production ==
The series' unique blend of traditional 2D anime design with 3D cel shading has earned many awards, including the prestigious Grand Prix Award at KOCCA's Star Project Competition in South Korea.

== Episodes ==
Series #	English title	Korean airdate
1	"Super Trio"	December 4, 2006
2	"Z-Squad"	December 18, 2006
3	"First Mission"	January 8, 2007
4	"Power Belt - Part 1"	January 15, 2007
5	"Power Belt - Part 2"	January 22, 2007
6	"Blind Love"	January 29, 2007
7	"The Riddle of the Pandora Zoot"	February 12, 2007
8	"Shaking the Foundation"	February 26, 2007
9	"Unfair Match"	March 5, 2007
10	"Luther's Revenge"	March 12, 2007
11	"Pollution Zoot"	March 19, 2007
12	"Endangered Love Zoot"	March 26, 2007
13	"Teamwork - Part 1"	April 9, 2007
14	"Teamwork - Part 2"	April 16, 2007
15	"The Zoot of Greed - Part 1"	April 17, 2007
16	"The Zoot of Greed - Part 2"	April 23, 2007
17	"The Zoo"	April 24, 2007
18	"The Sorrow of Bernice"	April 30, 2007
19	"Rules of the Road - Part 1"	May 1, 2007
20	"Rules of the Road - Part 2"	May 8, 2007
21	"My Favourite Dog - Part 1"	May 14, 2007
22	"My Favourite Dog - Part 2"	May 15, 2007
23	"Communication Breakdown"	May 21, 2007
24	"Game Over"	May 22, 2007
25	"Thanks for the Memories - Part 1"	May 28, 2007
26	"Thanks for the Memories - Part 2"	June 4, 2007

== Broadcast ==
Z-Squad first aired in South Korea on SBS between December 2006 and June 2007. The series was later broadcast on Champ TV, Cartoon Network, Anione, and KT IPTV.

The show had its English-language debut on Pop Girl in the United Kingdom. Along with Di-Gata Defenders, Z-Squad was introduced as part of the Syfy Kids block on the multi-national KidsCo network in June 2013. It was also one of the shows included when NBC ported Syfy Kids to Asia the following month. It was aimed at ages 6–10.

Initial plans for a North American broadcast reportedly included YTV and Teletoon in Canada, with Disney Channel on board in the United States. However, the show would never air on linear television in either market, instead being limited to video-on-demand platforms. In Canada, the series was included as part of the Kids Suite service for Rogers Cable customers in 2014. In the United States, Z-Squad is available to purchase on Amazon Video and is available to stream on Tubi TV.
