= Total Drama: Revenge of the Island =

- The Total Drama: Revenge of the Island logo.
- Starring: Christian Potenza; Clé Bennett; Kevin Duhaney; Tyrone Savage; Barbara Mamabolo; James Wallis; Laurie Elliott; Cory Doran; Carleigh Beverly; Athena Karkanis; Jon Cor; Brian Froud; Caitlynne Medrek; Ashley Peters
- No. of episodes: 13

Release
- Original network: Teletoon (Canada); Cartoon Network (U.S.)
- Original release: January 5 – April 12, 2012

Season chronology
- ← Previous; World Tour Next → All-Stars; Pahkitew Island

Total Drama: Revenge of the Island (also called TDROTI or TDRI for short) is the fourth season of Total Drama. The series' extension was commissioned by Teletoon from the producers, Fresh TV. It is a sequel to Total Drama Island, Total Drama Action, and Total Drama World Tour and is a parody of reality TV shows, with this season taking the contestants back to Camp Wawanakwa (the original setting of the first season), only this time the island is radioactive. Total Drama: Revenge of the Island notably features an entirely new cast. The thirteen new contestants who are introduced in here are Anne Maria, B/Beverly, Brick, Cameron, Dakota, Dawn, Jo, Lightning, Mike, Sam, Scott, Staci, and Zoey. This season has new friendships, new rivalries, and new relationships. However, the season is only half the length of any previous seasons, with just 13 episodes.

== Plot ==
Like Total Drama Island, this season is a fictional reality show that follows the competition of thirteen new contestants at Camp Wawanakwa, a summer camp on a fictional island located in an unspecified area in Muskoka, Ontario. However, since the island has been forgotten and left alone for the past two seasons, the island has been used as a toxic nuclear waste dump, transforming it into the perfect location for the most dramatic and brutal challenges yet. The new cast of campers must then participate in competitions to avoid being voted off the island as they all try to get ready to compete with some of the most popular original contestants in the fourth season. They spend almost 2 weeks (13 days) in this camp competing in challenges for immunity and at the end of the season, one winning contestant will have the chance to win C$1,000,000 (US$731,485.00). The competition is hosted by Chris McLean (Christian Potenza), who is assisted by the camp's chef, Chef Hatchet (Clé Bennett).

At the beginning of the season, the thirteen campers are placed onto two teams, the Mutant Maggots and the Toxic Rats. In each episode, the teams participate in a challenge, in which one or more campers can win invincibility for their team. The losing team is called to the elimination ceremony at night, where they vote one of their own members off the island. At the ceremony, Chris declares which contestants are safe by calling their name and giving them a marshmallow, while the one whose name is not called is eliminated from the game and given a radioactive marshmallow. The eliminated camper is then taken to the Hurl of Shame and catapulted. However, an eliminated camper can stay in the game if they find a wooden Chris head (the elimination goes to the contestant with the second most number of votes).

About halfway through the season, the Toxic Rats and the Mutant Maggots are disbanded, after which the challenges continue; the winner of each challenge then only receives invincibility for him or herself, whereupon a camper without invincibility is voted off the island. This process of elimination is continued until two players (Cameron and Lightning) remain on the island, where then they are subject to a final contest for the million.

== Episodes ==
Total Drama: Revenge of the Island premiered on both Teletoon and Cartoon Network in 2012. Teletoon aired Total Drama: Revenge of the Island in Canada on Thursday nights at 7:00 p.m. EST from January 5, 2012, to April 12, 2012, while on June 5, 2012, the U.S. started airing it on Tuesday nights at 7:30 p.m. EST on Cartoon Network. However, the first worldwide airing for this season was in France via Canal+ Family.

No. overall	No. in season	Title	Written by (Note: Information is taken from the opening credits of each episode.)	Original air date	U.S. air date	Prod. code	U.S. viewers (millions)
81	1	"Bigger! Badder! Brutal-er!"	Alex Ganetakos	January 5, 2012	June 5, 2012	401	3.3
After Chris and Chef placed Alejandro in the Drama Machine due to his lava injury after the events of Season 3, They head back to Camp Wawanakwa, the area has been used as a bio-hazardous waste dump, causing all of the island's environment and creatures to become radioactive. Thirteen new contestants are introduced: Anne Maria, B/Beverly, Brick, Cameron, Dakota, Dawn, Jo, Lightning, Mike, Sam, Scott, Staci, and Zoey. They are divided into two teams: the Toxic Rats and the Mutant Maggots. Zoey and Mike build a close bond, but he hides that he has multiple personality disorder from her. Staci manages to annoy her entire team with her constant lies, causing her to be the first eliminated. Elimination: Staci
82	2	"Truth or Laser Shark"	Jenn Engels	January 12, 2012	June 12, 2012	402	N/A
The campers must compete in the first part of their challenge; a tell-all trivia game that winds up embarrassing several contestants. Due to the campers ending the first challenge prematurely, Chris makes the second challenge, an obstacle course, harder for both teams. Cameron wins for the Mutant Maggots, sending the Toxic Rats to the elimination ceremony. In the end, Dakota is voted off due to constantly being distracted by the paparazzi. Elimination: Dakota
83	3	"Ice Ice Baby"	Laurie Elliott	January 19, 2012	June 19, 2012	403	N/A
During some of the iciest challenges yet, Jo asserts herself as the team leader while Scott plans to sabotage his team, hoping to eliminate threats. Meanwhile, Mike showcases a new personality named Vito. B/Beverly is framed by Scott for losing the challenge. As a result, B/Beverly is voted off, while Dakota returns to the island but is made an intern. Elimination: B/Beverly
84	4	"Finders Creepers"	Charles Johnston	January 26, 2012	June 26, 2012	404	1.85
The two teams are sent into the woods at night on a scavenger hunt, where a mutant spider hunts them down one by one. Vito hooks up with Anne Maria, despite Mike being interested in Zoey. Meanwhile, Scott continues to sabotage his team but winds up winning due to Brick leaving his teammates behind. The Mutant Maggots attend their first elimination ceremony, where Brick volunteers for elimination, but ends up switching to the Toxic Rats.
85	5	"Backstabbers Ahoy!"	Scott Oleszkowicz	February 2, 2012	July 3, 2012	405	N/A
As the Toxic Rats deal with their new teammate Brick, Mutant Maggots become divided thanks to Mike, whose personality Vito causes tension with Zoey. When the contestants' most prized possessions start vanishing, Scott tries to blame Brick. The rivalry between Brick and Jo intensifies. Dawn takes charge of her team and deduces that Scott is sabotaging the Toxic Rats. Scott frames her for stealing everyone's items, resulting in Dawn's elimination. Elimination: Dawn
86	6	"Runaway Model"	Alex Nussbaum	February 9, 2012	July 10, 2012	406	N/A
The campers are forced to find an animal on the island and dress it up for a fashion show. Sam gets advice from Dakota, who appreciates someone listening to her. When Lindsay is captured by an angry sasquatch and taken to Boney Island, Sam has a chance to prove himself, but loses the challenge and is eliminated. However, he does manage to win over Dakota's heart. Later, Chris makes Jo and Scott switch teams. Elimination: Sam
87	7	"A Mine is a Terrible Thing to Waste"	Eliza Crosland	February 16, 2012	July 17, 2012	407	N/A
The nine contestants remaining are sent into an abandoned mine, where Jo takes charge of her team, and Mike reveals a new personality named Manitoba Smith. Brick throws the challenge to save his old team, which results in his elimination. Meanwhile, Ezekiel (still mutated from World Tour) falls in love with Anne Maria, and gives her a giant diamond. This leads to her quitting the competition, before discovering too late that the diamond is fake. Dakota returns to the Mutant Maggots to take Anne Maria's place as a contestant on the show. Elimination: Brick Quit: Anne Maria
88	8	"The Treasure Island of Dr. McLean"	Laurie Elliott	February 23, 2012	July 24, 2012	408	N/A
The teams are tasked with finding treasure consisting of a buried Gwen and Sam. Dakota starts mutating due to toxic exposure from the mine challenge and tries to befriend Zoey. Meanwhile, Cameron tries to help Mike keep his personality under control. Scott, again sabotaging the team, is revealed to have found the idol, and asks Zoey to keep it a secret. Meanwhile, Dakota mutates further, becoming "The Dakotazoid," and reunites with Sam. Cameron accidentally discloses Mike's multiple personality disorder to Scott. Scott gets eliminated but uses the idol to save himself and Zoey uses her vote to eliminate Dakota instead. Elimination: Dakota (2nd time)
89	9	"Grand Chef Auto"	Jeremy Winkels	March 1, 2012	July 31, 2012	409	N/A
The final six are merged, and Chris sends the players on a go-kart challenge. Scott continually blackmails Mike into doing everything for him, Jo betrays Lightning, and Zoey becomes more fed up with Mike's behavior. Mike battles his inner personalities and comes out on top, before he finally admits the truth to Zoey. However as Scott wins the challenge, he is allowed to eliminate the contestant of his choice, which is Mike. Elimination: Mike
90	10	"Up, Up & Away in My Pitiful Balloon"	Richard Clark	March 8, 2012	August 14, 2012	410	N/A
The competition is down to the final five, and when Chris places the contestants in an aerial-based challenge, tensions between them grow, especially Zoey and Scott. Jo ropes Cameron into an alliance. However, after Heather shows up and steals the money (for losing it last season), the challenge shifts to catching her. In the end, the money is reclaimed and Jo is betrayed by Cameron and eliminated. Before Jo is hurled she insults Lightning calling him an idiot for thinking she was a boy. Elimination: Jo
91	11	"Eat, Puke & Be Wary"	Alex Nussbaum	March 22, 2012	August 21, 2012	411	N/A
The final four are forced to partake in a disgusting cooking challenge after Chris gets caught in Scott's trap and thrown into the bathrooms. Cameron and Zoey join forces to get rid of Scott, while Scott tries to eliminate Lightning. Chef hunts the contestants down in the woods, and Zoey finally snaps from the trauma, becoming "Commando Zoey." Cameron steals immunity from Lightning behind his back, while Scott is finally eliminated, getting his comeuppance in the form of Fang. Elimination: Scott
92	12	"The Enchanted Franken-Forest"	Laurie Elliott	March 29, 2012	August 28, 2012	412	N/A
The final three face off in a forest full of toxic carnivorous plants. Zoey and Cameron's friendship becomes severely strained. When Cameron is in danger, Zoey gives up winning to save Cameron, allowing Lightning to win the challenge and the choice of whom to eliminate. He decides to eliminate Zoey so that he can settle his rivalry with Cameron for good in the finale. Elimination: Zoey
93	13	"Brain vs. Brawn: The Ultimate Showdown"	Alex Ganetakos	April 12, 2012	August 28, 2012	413	N/A
Cameron and Lightning remain in the competition, and their mission is to battle it out for the million-dollar prize! They are taken to the Colosseum to fight in the ultimate final challenge, which features numerous obstacles and the return of a few old faces. In Cameron's ending, he manages to pin Lightning and wins the million and decides to split it with everyone. In Lightning's ending, he pins Cameron and wins, but suffers from injuries due to being struck by actual lightning. Runner-Up: Lightning/Cameron Winner: Cameron/Lightning

=== Episode finale variations ===
For every season, the show's producers create two alternate endings for the final episode, such that the winner seen in one country's broadcasts is the runner-up in other countries (and vice versa) where the show airs. Cameron is the original winner in Canada, but he is also shown as the winner in Australia, Bulgaria, Croatia, Denmark, France, Hungary, Israel, Italy, Latin America and Brazil (Cartoon Network), the Middle East, the Netherlands, New Zealand, Portugal, Russia, Serbia, Singapore, Spain, South Africa, Finland, Japan, Latin America, Brazil, Norway, Poland, Romania, and Sweden, Turkey, and the United Kingdom. Lightning is the original runner-up in Canada, but he is also the winner in the Philippines.

When the season finale aired in the United States, the penultimate episode and finale were aired together and advertised as a 1-hour finale where viewers could vote for a winner. Although Zoey places 3rd no matter what, viewers were allowed to vote for her on Cartoon Network's website.

== Characters ==
The primary cast of Total Drama: Revenge of the Island which as shown from left to right are: Top: Cameron (Canadian winner) Standing: Anne Maria, Mike, Zoey, Lightning (American winner), Dawn, B, Sam, Brick, Scott, and Jo Sitting: Dakota and Staci

Unlike previous seasons, Total Drama: Revenge of the Island features a new set of contestants, which are Anne Maria, B, Brick, Cameron, Dakota, Dawn, Jo, Lightning, Mike, Sam, Scott, Staci, and Zoey. This is the very first time the series completely replaces every existing cast member with an all-new cast. All of the new contestants have their own audition tapes for the season. They can be seen online on Teletoon's official website, online on Cartoon Network's official website, or on YouTube.

=== Staff ===
Character	Voice actor	Description
Chris McLean	Christian Potenza	Chris returns as the host of the series.
Chef Hatchet	Clé Bennett	Chef returns as the cook and co-host of the series.

=== Contestants ===
List of Total Drama: Revenge of the Island contestants
Contestant	Label	Voice actor	Team				Finish	
Contestant	Label	Voice actor	Original	First swap	Second swap	Merged	Placement	Episode
Staci	The Compulsive Liar	Ashley Peters	Toxic Rats				1st eliminated	1
Dakota (Returned to game)			Toxic Rats				2nd eliminated	2
B/Beverly	The Strong, Silent Genius	None	Toxic Rats				3rd eliminated	3
Dawn	The Moonchild	Caitlynne Medrek	Toxic Rats	Toxic Rats			4th eliminated	5
Sam	The Nice-Guy Gamer	Brian Froud	Toxic Rats	Toxic Rats			5th eliminated	6
Brick	The Cadet	Jon Cor	Mutant Maggots	Toxic Rats	Toxic Rats		6th eliminated	7
Anne Maria	The Jersey Shore Reject	Athena Karkanis	Mutant Maggots	Mutant Maggots	Mutant Maggots		7th eliminated (Quit)	7
Dakota	The Fame-Monger	Carleigh Beverly	Toxic Rats	Intern	Mutant Maggots		8th eliminated	8
Mike	The Multiple Personality Disorder	Cory Doran	Mutant Maggots	Mutant Maggots	Mutant Maggots	None	9th eliminated	9
Jo	The Take-No-Prisoners Jock-ette	Laurie Elliott	Mutant Maggots	Mutant Maggots	Toxic Rats	None	10th eliminated	10
Scott	The Devious	James Wallis	Toxic Rats	Toxic Rats	Mutant Maggots	None	11th eliminated	11
Zoey	The Indie Chick	Barbara Mamabolo	Mutant Maggots	Mutant Maggots	Mutant Maggots	None	12th eliminated	12
Lightning	The Athletic Overachiever	Tyrone Savage	Toxic Rats	Toxic Rats	Toxic Rats	None	Winner/Runner-up	13
Cameron	The Wide-Eyed Bubble Boy	Kevin Duhaney	Mutant Maggots	Mutant Maggots	Mutant Maggots	None	Winner/Runner Up	13

=== Original concepts ===
The original concept designs of the twelve characters' lineup in the early production stages.

In the early production stages, the character lineup had twelve contestants, and most of them had body shapes, colors, clothing, heights, hair styles, and faces that were completely different from the final designs. The thirteenth character who was added later was B. His design was similar to that of the character in the Total Drama Island special as the man in the car when Courtney "discovered" civilization. That character also happened to be DJ's prototype from the original Camp TV promos. Jo was later renamed to B (which stands for Beverly) while also getting his final design. The only other characters to have their name changed was Mary; she ended up using the name 'Jo'. Despite the rename, this character underwent the least amount of change in design. The other contestant who got renamed was Molly, being renamed to 'Zoey', while also carrying over her label. Anne Maria, Brick, Lightning, and Scott had minor modifications made to their outfits. Sam and Scott had different facial hair. The characters who had the most changes made to their designs were Dakota, Staci, and Zoey, who was originally named "Molly". Zoey's final design actually used the clothing and body shape from the original design for Dakota. Mike and Cameron had their ethnicities changed. Dawn, who was not in the original lineup, replaced an unused character named Zoey. Cameron's initial design would be reused for Jay and Mickey on Total Drama Presents: The Ridonculous Race.

=== Cameos ===
Although the original contestants did not compete again in this season (according to Chris, they had outlived their usefulness), nine of them still had cameo appearances throughout the season: Bridgette, DJ, Duncan, Ezekiel, Gwen, Heather, Izzy, Lindsay, and Owen. However, at the beginning of the season, all of the original contestants (except for Blaineley) were seen together on a yacht, revealing their status after Total Drama World Tour. They were all last seen (except for the nine who cameo) leaving on the yacht right before the new contestants were first introduced.

A list of all the cameos in Total Drama: Revenge of the Island and their roles during their cameos are shown below:

List of cameo appearances

Episode	Character	Role
1	Owen	He asked Chris why the boat with the original contestants was leaving, but then Chris blew him away with a bomb.
4	Izzy	She was disguised as a gigantic mutated spider to terrorize and capture the contestants during the challenge. Also, she captures Chef at the end.
5	Bridgette	She was used to help Chris chum the water and test the challenge, along with Dakota.
6	Lindsay	She was used as a judge in a fashion model contest, and later also used as a hostage against Sasquatchanakwa during a challenge to rescue her.
7	Ezekiel	He was found underground in the mine by Anne Maria as the leader over giant mutated gophers.
8	Gwen	She was found buried underground, along with Sam, as a damsel for the contestants to rescue in a challenge.
9	Duncan	He was used as a challenge demonstrator, but he escaped and later returned to blow up Mt. Chrismore.
10	Heather	She was used as a test dummy to fly through rings of fire, but she later steals the million dollar case and attempts to flee away.
11	DJ	He was used as a food eater and a judge for the cooking challenge, but he later runs away in fear.
12	Ezekiel	He was found trying to get out of the mine he was stuck in, but was then pushed back down by Lightning.
13	Ezekiel	He was used as one of the mutant creatures who were released to interfere with the final challenge. He saves Anne Maria from a mutant animal before proceeding to kiss her, much to her disgust and dismay.

The fifteen original contestants who no longer appeared after the first episode of the fourth season were Alejandro, Beth, Cody, Courtney, Eva, Geoff, Harold, Justin, Katie, Leshawna, Noah, Sadie, Sierra, Trent, and Tyler. Harold was thought to have a cameo as soon as Brian Froud was confirmed to be part of the cast, but it turned out that Brian voices Sam instead. Out of all the cameos, Ezekiel is the only original contestant who made cameos in more than one episode in the season (by this point in the series, however, he was a completely feral beast who was incapable of speaking English and his role served as a plot antagonist), while DJ is the only cameoing character who has the same voice actor as a main character (Chef) already with a major role.

== Elimination Table ==
Contestant	Episode													
Contestant	1	2	3	4	5	6	7		8	9	10	11	12	13
Cameron	WIN	WIN	WIN	—N/a	WIN	WIN	WIN		SAFE	SAFE	WIN	WIN	SAFE	WINNER/RUNNER UP
Lightning	SAFE	SAFE	SAFE	WIN	SAFE	SAFE	LOW		WIN	SAFE	LOW	LOW	WIN	WINNER/RUNNER-UP
Zoey	WIN	WIN	WIN	—N/a	WIN	WIN	WIN		SAFE	SAFE	SAFE	LOW	OUT	
Scott	SAFE	SAFE	SAFE	WIN	LOW	SAFE	WIN		IDOL	WIN	SAFE	OUT		
Jo	WIN	WIN	WIN	—N/a	WIN	WIN	SAFE		WIN	SAFE	OUT			
Mike	WIN	WIN	WIN	—N/a	WIN	WIN	WIN		SAFE	OUT				
Dakota	LOW	OUT							OUT					
Anne Maria	WIN	WIN	WIN	—N/a	WIN	WIN	WIN	QUIT						
Brick	WIN	WIN	WIN	SWAP	SAFE	LOW	OUT							
Sam	SAFE	SAFE	LOW	WIN	SAFE	OUT								
Dawn	SAFE	SAFE	SAFE	WIN	OUT									
B	SAFE	LOW	OUT											
Staci	OUT													

== Production ==
Total Drama: Revenge of the Island was developed and produced by Fresh TV and distributed by Cake Entertainment. Since all the characters in this season are completely new, the studio had to hire several new voice actors to voice the new characters, but Brian Froud (the voice actor of Harold) returned to voice Sam, one of the new characters. This season was directed by Keith Oliver and Chad Hicks, and Todd Kauffman had a small role in the making of this season. Production started in early 2010 when the season was first announced as Total Drama Reloaded, and the new characters were first released to the public by then. Production continued for almost a year well on schedule for a 2011 release date. However, major delays in 2011 caused the season's air date to be pushed back to 2012, since many scenes consisting of radioactive material had to be cut out or edited. There were also some other things that did not make the final cut also, including some backgrounds, extra scenes, a flying squirrel concept and an episode about Dakota hosting the show when she locks Chef and Chris in a closet.

=== Air date conflict and production delays ===
As revealed by Christian Potenza on the Total Drama: Live Action Panel at Canada's 2011 Fan Expo, Total Drama: Revenge of the Island was originally scheduled to air in July 2011 in the United States and in September 2011 in Canada, but due to the 2011 Tōhoku earthquake and tsunami and the nuclear accident which caused many Japanese citizens to receive radiation poisoning, many staff members found some of the season's scenes of radioactive material and creatures to be considered insensitive to victims of the disaster. This initiated the producers' decision to modify the storyline of the season in order to remove some of the radioactive references, leading to many scenes being edited out.

This process of re-editing the entire season required more production time, causing the U.S. air date to be delayed until September 2011 (the time when Canada was originally supposed to air the season), but failure to complete the full season by then (with many scenes that still had to be changed) now caused more delay for both the U.S. and Canada, until the season was fully finished by late 2011 for an early French airing. France aired the entire season on Canal+ in just 8 days from December 21, 2011, to December 29, 2011, becoming the only country to air the season in 2011.

Total Drama: Revenge of the Island aired in Canada four months later than originally expected on January 5, 2012, while the new rescheduled air date for the U.S. was not until June 5, 2012 (eleven months later than the original air date of July 2011). Although, they only aired the French version of the season that did not include the voices from the original voice actors (except Chris and Chef).

On May 28, 2012, Australia also began to air the season almost as fast as France did (one episode per weekday). Italy started to air the season on January 9, 2012, while Cartoon Network also aired the season in the Netherlands, Romania, Scandinavia and Hungary starting on March 5, 2012, Russia and Bulgaria on March 6, 2012, Poland and Africa on March 8, 2012 and Latin America on April 2, 2012. Originally, the season finale was set to air in the U.S. on September 11, 2012, but was instead pulled up to August 28 (two weeks from the original date) due to that date being a national memorial holiday.[citation needed] The final two episodes were aired together and advertised as a one-hour full-length season finale.

=== History ===
On March 25, 2011, the designs of all the 13 contestants were revealed. On March 27, 2011, all the names and personalities of the contestants were revealed in a press release. On April 5, 2011, Christian Potenza posted a YouTube video of him recording the first line of Total Drama: Revenge of the Island. The quote was:

Camp Wawanakwa! Once a paradise on earth, now a radioactive [biohazardous] dump! The perfect setting to drop a gang of teen-freaks and let 'em run wild! We're going back to the island, baby! A whole new set of campers. Each one more abnormal than the next [last]. A whole new set of radioactive [dangerous] challenges! Insane, deranged, disgusting! These are just a few words that describe this season's high level of drama and another million dollar prize! Stay tuned for a brand new vengeful season of Total! Drama! Revenge of the Island!

This line is used for the promotional trailer that Teletoon showed at the end of the Total Drama World Tour finale, which was first released on April 24, 2011 (Easter Sunday). On June 1, 2011 Christian Potenza released on his Facebook the new season logo along with more final designs of the characters. On June 3, 2011, there were snapshots of radioactive Camp Wawanakwa. On August 25, 2011, the Total Drama: Revenge of the Island flipbook was released. On August 28, 2011, the first official cast image was released to the public via Facebook. On September 24, 2011, the third official trailer was released which contained new scenes and confirmed the team assignments. On September 27, 2011, at the Total Drama: Live Action Panel at Canada's 2011 Fan Expo, Cory Doran confirmed all of Mike's personalities, and Christian Potenza said that the team name for the Radioactive Rats was scrapped. On October 13, 2011, Christian Potenza revealed several things about the intro of the season and said that promos will be out soon. On November 28, 2011, the official Canadian air date for the season was announced to air on January 5, 2012. On December 14, 2011, an animated interview with Chris McLean and a fan was released and revealed that the new team name is now "Toxic Rats". On December 18, 2011, the official Total Drama: Revenge of the Island website was launched that includes interactive menus and biographies of all the new contestants, as well as videos and season descriptions. On December 21, 2011, France began to air the season's episodes, two weeks before Canada. On Christmas 2011, all of the auditions of the 13 new characters were released on Teletoon's official Total Drama site.

== Reception ==
Total Drama: Revenge of the Island has received generally positive reviews, despite attracting some criticism for its shorter length in comparison to the previous seasons and the supposed flanderization of the host Chris McLean. In the United States, over 3.3 million people have viewed the season, with over 51% growth over last year, making Total Drama: Revenge of the Island the #1 telecast of the year for Cartoon Network. Tom McGillis said in a 2012 interview that both Total Drama: Revenge of the Island and Total Drama Island are the highest rated seasons of the series. This season has been viewed in over 100 countries, worldwide.

== Media ==
Madman Entertainment released Season 4 of Total Drama on October 8, 2014, on a Region 4 DVD.
