= Total Drama Island (2023) =

Canadian animated TV series

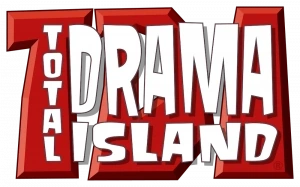
- The Total Drama Island logo
- Starring: Terry McGurrin; Deven Mack; Eman Ayaz; Julie Sype; Jack Copland; Brandon Michael Arrington; Varun Saranga; Gerardo Gismondi; Barbara Mamabolo; Melanie Leishman; Kimberly Ann Truong; Daniel Keith Morrison; Fred Kennedy; Kwaku Adu-Poku; Julius Cho; Tamara Almeida; Tymika Tafari; Katie Griffin
- No. of episodes: 26

Release
- Original network: Cartoon Network (Canada); Cartoon Network (U.S.); CBBC (U.K.)
- Original release: October 21, 2023 – April 14, 2024

Season chronology
- ← Previous; All-Stars; Pahkitew Island Next → TBA

Total Drama Island is the sixth season of the Canadian animated television series Total Drama, and the first season of the revival series after its eight-year hiatus. The first part of the season premiered in Italy on K2 and Discovery+ on April 10, 2023, and the second part of the season premiered in Italy on December 4, 2023. The first part of the season also premiered in the United States on June 1, 2024, and the second part of the season premiered on May 31, 2025 on Cartoon Network with the episodes dropping next day on Max.

The season was produced by Fresh TV and Corus Entertainment, in association with Cartoon Network and the BBC, and distributed by Cake Entertainment. Despite being announced as two 13-episode seasons, it was later revealed in the credits of the second half that they were one 26-episode season, similar to the previous season. Unlike previous seasons, there are no alternate endings.

== Plot ==
The season takes place fifteen years after the events of the first season, also titled Total Drama Island, and features new contestants competing on a new island modeled after Camp Wawanakwa, located in an unspecified area in Muskoka, Ontario. They spend almost 2 weeks (13 days) on the island competing in challenges for immunity. At the end of the season, one contestant will win C$1,000,000 (US$740,990.00). The competition is hosted by Chris McLean (Terry McGurrin, replacing Christian Potenza), who is assisted by the camp's chef and his co-host, Chef Hatchet (Deven Mack, replacing Clé Bennett).

== Episodes ==
=== Part 1 ===
No. overall	No. in season	Title	Written by	Original air date	U.S. air date	Prod. code	U.S. viewers (millions)
120	1	"Meet the Victims"	Jennifer Pertsch	October 21, 2023	June 1, 2024	101	0.111
Chris welcomes 16 new campers back to the original island and divides them into two teams who will face off in a blindfolded challenge that's sure to cause pain. Elimination: Celeb
121	2	"Pirates of the Cabbage'an"	Terry McGurrin	October 21, 2023	June 8, 2024	102	0.141
The two teams go to war, firing cabbages from cannons at each other from their respective pirate ships. The first team to sink the other will be the winner, but someone takes a very personal interest in one specific target. Elimination: Axel
122	3	"Drown Town Abbey"	Sam Ruano	October 28, 2023	June 15, 2024	103	0.120
Each team has a member placed into a clear glass tank that is locked and slowly filling with water. In order to free them, they must retrieve the codes at the far end of a dangerous obstacle course. Elimination: Nichelle
123	4	"Numbskull Island"	Miles G. Smith	October 28, 2023	June 22, 2024	104	0.106
It's just a normal game of capture the flag, except the flag is a skull, and the opponents are armed with fire hoses, toilet plunger harpoons and giant rolling boulders. Elimination: Scary Girl
124	5	"Jurassic Fart"	Neha Kohli	November 4, 2023	June 29, 2024	105	0.050
After an all-bean breakfast, the teams must cross the island in silence to avoid being eaten by raptors. The first team to reach the other side claims victory. Elimination: Damien
125	6	"The Launchback of Notre Game"	Laurie Elliott	November 4, 2023	July 6, 2024	106	0.119
Catapult your team member into distant scoring zones to earn points, but if you miss you'll be landing in a penalty zone filled with all kind of evil. The first team to reach 10,000 points wins. The losing team, as always, will be sending someone home. Elimination: MK
126	7	"Severe Eggs and Pains"	Nigel Downer	November 11, 2023	July 13, 2024	107	0.125
Chris responds to the network's request for a holiday special by making the campers hunt for eggs. Who cares that it's not Easter? And who cares if the hunt is for Cassowary eggs? With the teams now merged, it's all about being the first one back with an egg and winning immunity. Well, that and not getting gutted by a giant bird. Elimination: Wayne and Raj
127	8	"The Wheel of Vomit"	Andrew Harrison	November 11, 2023	July 20, 2024	108	0.054
Chef finally gets to show off his fancy culinary skills in an eating challenge where each dish is a tastebud's nightmare. The last camper still eating wins immunity. Elimination: Ripper
128	9	"Paddle Field Earth"	Ben Joseph	November 18, 2023	July 27, 2024	109	0.145
Today's challenge involves canoeing, hiking and mountain climbing. It's just like normal summer camp, except that you canoe over a waterfall, hike through a geyser field and climb a mountain that's actually the world's biggest beehive. Elimination: Zee
129	10	"The Truth, The Pole Truth and Nothing But the Truth"	Tony Tran	November 18, 2023	August 3, 2024	110	0.114
One member from each team must spend the day balancing on a pole under the hot sun, and with no food in their tummy. Elimination: Chase
130	11	"Tortoise Rigamortis"	Miles G. Smith	November 25, 2023	August 10, 2024	111	0.116
With just five campers remaining, things are getting tense, so today is just about having fun taking selfies with wild animals. Elimination: Emma
131	12	"Caved by the Bell"	Andrew Harrison	November 25, 2023	August 17, 2024	112	0.167
The final four must hunt for coins in a dark and spooky cave. The challenge only gets worse when they discover that something is also hunting them. Elimination: Julia
132	13	"Magma Cum Laude"	Neha Kohli	December 2, 2023	August 24, 2024	113	TBA
This is it! Today, one of the three remaining campers will become a millionaire. The only thing standing in their way is two other campers, a forest, some lava, some violent goats, a mountain and vomit. Other than that, it's pretty easy. Runner-Ups: Millie and Bowie Winner: Priya

=== Part 2 ===
No. overall	No. in season	Title	Written by	Original air date	U.S. air date	Prod. code	U.S. viewers (millions)
133	14	"The Pink Painter Strikes Again"	Andrew Harrison	March 3, 2024	May 31, 2025	114	0.073
They're back! All 16 campers from the first series return for more spills, thrills, and drama! And a very special guest arrives on the island to really mess things up. Hope everyone packed an extra pair of pants! Elimination: Scary Girl
134	15	"Taking It to the Rim Reaper"	Neha Kohli	March 3, 2024	June 7, 2025	115	0.070
Things get wet, wild and gross when the campers play waterslide basketball! Elimination: Chase
135	16	"You Poor Saps"	Miles G. Smith	March 10, 2024	June 14, 2025	116	0.049
Tensions run high in this week's challenge when the Campers find themselves in a sticky situation. Elimination: Millie
136	17	"Choosin' for a Bruisin'"	Laurie Elliott	March 10, 2024	June 21, 2025	117	0.041
The campers get tested on how well they know each other. Correct answers could win them immunity, but incorrect answers drop them into a pool of hungry wolverines. Elimination: Emma
137	18	"Ice to Beat You"	Nigel Downer	March 17, 2024	June 28, 2025	118	0.047
A chilling challenge inside an iceberg leads to the coldest elimination of the season. Elimination: Nichelle
138	19	"Canoe Believe It?"	Amanda McNeice	March 24, 2024	July 5, 2025	119	TBA
During a fun-filled day of canoe jousting, a special friendship is founded and an outed cheater gets pounded. Elimination: Bowie
139	20	"Fun Fight at the O'Cake Corral"	Tony Tran	March 24, 2024	July 12, 2025	120	0.062
It's definitely no cake walk as Campers compete in the ultimate island bake-off. A very special guest judge even stops by for a bite! Elimination: Axel and Ripper
140	21	"Haulin' n' Ballin'"	Andrew Harrison	March 31, 2024	July 19, 2025	121	0.058
The fate of Priya and Caleb's relationship hangs in the balance as Zee struggles to keep a secret. And it all plays out during a brutal game of human pinball. Elimination: Zee
141	22	"Breaking Up Is Hard to Do"	Amanda McNeice	March 31, 2024	July 26, 2025	122	0.060
Caleb is desperate to put his relationship with Priya back together, while the campers tear apart the largest objects they can find. Elimination: MK
142	23	"Circling the Drain"	Andrew Harrison	April 7, 2024	August 2, 2025	123	0.039
Julia gets between Caleb and Priya during the most painful memory game of all time. Elimination: Damien
143	24	"Working K9 to 5"	Raf Antonio	April 7, 2024	August 9, 2025	124	0.070
Release the hounds! Campers are hunted by a pack of fearsome attack dogs... and one pug. Elimination: Raj
144	25	"Off the Hook!"	Miles G. Smith	April 14, 2024	August 16, 2025	125	0.048
Things get scary when campers are pulled into a fishhook challenge that pits them against both each other and their worst dreaded fears. Elimination: Priya
145	26	"Soar Losers"	Terry McGurrin	April 14, 2024	August 23, 2025	126	0.074
Only three campers remain to take on the final challenge and potentially win the $1 million that Chris promised them. Runner-Ups: Julia and Caleb Winner: Wayne

== Characters ==
Total Drama Island features an entirely new cast of 16 contestants. This is the third time the series completely replaces any existing cast with an all-new cast. The new contestants competing are: Axel, Bowie, Caleb, Chase, Damien, Emma, Julia, Millie, MK, Nichelle, Priya, Raj, Ripper, Scary Girl, Wayne, and Zee.

=== Hosts ===
Character	Voice actor	Role
Chris McLean	Terry McGurrin	Host
Chef Hatchet	Deven Mack	Chef and co-host

=== Contestants ===
Although both parts share the same group of sixteen contestants, their teams and placements differ across both.

==== Part 1 ====
List of Total Drama Island (2023) Part 1 contestants
Contestant	Label	Voice actor	Team		Finish	
Contestant	Label	Voice actor	Original	Merged	Placement	Episode
Caleb	The Smoking Hot Player	Kwaku Adu-Poku	Frogs of Death		16th	1: Meet the Victims
Axel	The Hard Core	Tamara Almeida	Ferocious Trout		15th	2: Pirates of the Cabbage'an
Nichelle	Gorgeous with a Side of Substance	Tymika Tafari	Frogs of Death		14th	3: Drown Town Abbey
Scary Girl	AKA Lauren	Katie Griffin	Ferocious Trout		13th	4: Numbskull Island
Damien	The Reactionary	Daniel Keith Morrison	Ferocious Trout		12th	5: Jurassic Fart
MK	The Outrageous and Underestimated	Kimberly Ann Truong	Frogs of Death		11th	6: The Launchback of Notre Game
Raj	The Hockey Bros	Jack Copland	Frogs of Death	None	9th/10th (Evacuated)	7: Severe Eggs and Pains
Wayne	The Hockey Bros	Varun Saranga	Frogs of Death	None	9th/10th (Evacuated)	7: Severe Eggs and Pains
Ripper	The Bad Boy	Fred Kennedy	Ferocious Trout	None	8th	8: The Wheel of Vomit
Zee	The Good Vibes Only Guy	Gerardo Gismondi	Ferocious Trout	None	7th	9: Paddle Field Earth
Chase	The Other YouTube Sensation	Julius Cho	Ferocious Trout	None	6th	10: The Truth, The Pole Truth and Nothing But the Truth
Emma	The Breakout YouTube Star	Melanie Leishman	Frogs of Death	None	5th	11: Tortoise Rigamortis
Julia	The Influencer and Evil in Human Form	Julie Sype	Frogs of Death	None	4th	12: Caved by the Bell
Millie	The Book-Smart One	Barbara Mamabolo	Ferocious Trout	None	3rd	13: Magma Cum Laude
Bowie	The Loveable Party Boy	Brandon Michael Arrington	Frogs of Death	None	2nd (Runner-up)	13: Magma Cum Laude
Priya	The Novice of Everything	Eman Ayaz	Ferocious Trout	None	1st (Winner)	13: Magma Cum Laude

==== Part 2 ====
List of Total Drama Island (2023) Part 2 contestants
Contestant	Label	Voice actor	Team		Finish	
Contestant	Label	Voice actor	Original	Merged	Placement	Episode
Scary Girl	AKA Lauren	Katie Griffin	Team Skunk Butt		16th	14: The Pink Painter Strikes Again
Chase	The Other YouTube Sensation	Julius Cho	Team Skunk Butt		15th	15: Taking It to the Rim Reaper
Millie	The Book-Smart One	Barbara Mamabolo	Team Rat Face		14th	16: You Poor Saps
Emma	The Breakout YouTube Star	Melanie Leishman	Team Rat Face		13th	17: Choosin' for a Bruisin'
Nichelle	Gorgeous with a Side of Substance	Tymika Tafari	Team Rat Face		12th (Quit)	18: Ice to Beat You
Bowie	The Loveable Party Boy	Brandon Michael Arrington	Team Skunk Butt	None	11th	19: Canoe Believe It?
Axel	The Hard Core	Tamara Almeida	Team Rat Face	None	10th	20: Fun Fight at the O'Cake Corral
Ripper	The Bad Boy	Fred Kennedy	Team Skunk Butt	None	9th (Quit)	20: Fun Fight at the O'Cake Corral
Zee	The Good Vibes Only Guy	Gerardo Gismondi	Team Rat Face	None	8th	21: Haulin' n' Ballin'
MK	The Outrageous and Underestimated	Kimberly Ann Truong	Team Skunk Butt	None	7th	22: Breaking Up Is Hard to Do
Damien	The Reactionary	Daniel Keith Morrison	Team Rat Face	None	6th	23: Circling the Drain
Raj	The Hockey Bros (with Wayne)	Varun Saranga	Team Skunk Butt	None	5th	24: Working K9 to 5
Priya	The Novice of Everything	Eman Ayaz	Team Rat Face	None	4th	25: Off the Hook!
Julia	The Influencer and Evil in Human Form	Julie Sype	Team Skunk Butt	None	Tied for 2nd (Runners-up)	26: Soar Losers
Caleb	The Smoking Hot Player	Kwaku Adu-Poku	Team Rat Face	None	Tied for 2nd (Runners-up)	26: Soar Losers
Wayne	The Hockey Bros (with Raj)	Jack Copland	Team Skunk Butt	None	1st (Winner)	26: Soar Losers

==== Guests/cameos ====
List of Total Drama Island (2023) Part 2 guests/cameos
Character	Voice actor	Role
Axe Hatchet	Molly Johnson	Episode: "The Pink Painter Strikes Again"
Owen	Scott McCord	Episode: "Fun Fight at the O'Cake Corral"
MacArthur	Evany Rosen	Episode: "Working K-9 to 5"
Pete	David Huband	Episode: "Off the Hook!"
Leshawna's Grandmother	Jackie Richardson	Episode: "Off the Hook!"

In addition, Gerry, aka the Tennis Rival from Total Drama Presents: The Ridonculous Race, makes a cameo in Off the Hook! inside Julia's fear tank along with Pete (although only Pete speaks). Rock and Spud, the Rockers also from The Ridonculous Race, make non-speaking cameo appearances in one of Nichelle's films, and Courtney, Duncan, and Izzy make very brief appearances on photos.

== Elimination table ==
=== Part 1 ===
Contestant	Episode												
Contestant	1	2	3	4	5	6	7	8	9	10	11	12	13
Priya	Win	In	Win	In	In	Win	In	In	In	In	In	Win	Winner
Bowie	In	Win	In	Win	Win	In	In	In	Low	In	Low	In	Runner-up
Millie	Win	In	Win	In	In	Win	Win	Low	In	Low	In	Low	Out
Julia	In	Win	In	Win	Win	Low	In	Win	Win	In	Win	Out	
Emma	Low	Win	In	Win	Win	In	In	In	In	Win	Out		
Chase	Win	In	Win	In	In	Win	In	In	In	Out			
Zee	Win	In	Win	In	In	Win	In	In	Out				
Ripper	Win	Low	Win	Low	Low	Win	In	Out					
Raj	In	Win	In	Win	Win	In	Evac.						
Wayne	In	Win	In	Win	Win	In	Evac.						
MK	In	Win	Low	Win	Win	Out							
Damien	Win	In	Win	In	Out								
Scary Girl	Win	In	Win	Out									
Nichelle	In	Win	Out										
Axel	Win	Out											
Caleb	Out												

=== Part 2 ===
Contestant	Episode												
Contestant	14	15	16	17	18	19	20	21	22	23	24	25	26
Wayne	In	In	Win	Win	Win	In	Win	In	In	In	In	In	Winner
Caleb	Win	Win	In	In	In	In	In	Low	Win	Safe (Note: As the winner of the challenge, Julia was able to share immunity with another camper, and she ended up sharing it with Caleb.)	Low	Win	Runners-up
Julia	In	In	Win	Win	Win	In	Win	In	Low	Win	Win	Safe (Note: Julia played the Invincibility Statue, nulling all votes against her.)	Runners-up
Priya	Win	Win	In	Low	In	In	In	Win	In	Low	In	Out	
Raj	In	In	Win	Win	Win	In	Win	In	In	In	Out		
Damien	Win	Win	In	In	In	Win	In	In	In	Out			
MK	In	In	Win	Win	Win	Low	In	In	Out				
Zee	Win	Win	In	In	In	In	In	Out					
Ripper	In	Low	Win	Win	Win	In	Quit						
Axel	Win	Win	In	In	In	In	Out						
Bowie	Low	In	Win	Win	Win	Out							
Nichelle	Win	Win	In	In	Quit								
Emma	Win	Win	Low	Out									
Millie	Win	Win	Out										
Chase	In	Out											
Scary Girl	Out												

== Production ==
=== Development ===
On February 17, 2021, it was announced that two new seasons were being produced for Cartoon Network and Max. On June 22, 2022, it was announced by Cake Entertainment that the BBC had joined Warner Bros. Discovery as a co-commissioner for the new seasons and would air them on CBBC in the United Kingdom. In addition, the previous five seasons of the show and its spin-offs would be added to BBC iPlayer. Terry McGurrin later clarified on Twitter that despite essentially filling the role of sixth and seventh seasons, the new seasons are instead being produced as a new series. Despite its similar appearance and being listed in promotional material as Wawanakwa, Terry McGurrin clarified on December 14, 2022, that it is a separate island, and that Wawanakwa still sank, with the new island featuring different landmarks and there no longer being a sign on the dock.

=== Casting ===
Christian Potenza initially announced that he would reprise his role as Chris McLean from the original, having recorded his lines for the series by late September 2021. However, in late March 2023, following the release of the first English trailer for the series, Terry McGurrin revealed that he would replace Potenza as the voice of Chris instead, citing it as a creative decision taken during development. On October 27, 2022, it was confirmed in an interview with McGurrin on YouTube that Deven Mack would replace Clé Bennett as the voice of Chef Hatchet, reprising his role from the spin-off series Total DramaRama. On April 5, 2023, Fred Kennedy announced on his Twitter account that he would be voicing Ripper, one of the contestants in the series.
