= Go Away, Unicorn! =

Canadian animated television series

- Genre: Comedy; Fantasy
- Based on: Go Away, Unicorn! by Emily Mullock
- Developed by: Dan Signer
- Directed by: Jason Groh
- Voices of: Chris Diamantopoulos; Rebecca Husain; Jennifer Hale
- Theme music composer: Walk Off the Earth
- Composer: Matt Ouimet
- Countries of origin: United States; Canada
- Original language: English
- No. of seasons: 1
- No. of episodes: 26

Production
- Executive producers: Andrea Gorfolova; Ashley Rite
- Producer: Coral Schoug
- Running time: 22 minutes
- Production companies: Sonar; Nelvana Limited

Original release
- Network: YTV (Canada); Disney Channel (US)
- Release: September 7, 2018 – June 8, 2019

Go Away, Unicorn! is an animated children's television series co-produced for YTV and Disney Channel by Sonar and Nelvana Limited. Evan Thaler Hickey and Alex Ganetakos provide story editing services for the series, with Jason Groh directing. The series aired from September 7, 2018, to June 8, 2019.

== Plot ==
The series, based on the book of the same name by Emily Mullock (originally published by McKellar & Martin), features a young girl named Alice and her best friend—an energetic male unicorn—as they explore their differences and realize that friendships can be found at the unlikeliest of places.

The series stars Chris Diamantopoulos (Mickey Mouse) as the eponymous Unicorn and Rebecca Husain (Beat Bugs) as Alice. Alice's other friends include Varun Saranga as Ollie, an Indian-Canadian boy whose father was a champion speller back in his homeland, and spelled the very lengthy word vakrapucchalalajjihvaindramahhakarman, which is another word for a dog; and Pixie, a happy-go-lucky girl who loves pink glitter, tossing it into the air every now and then.

== Characters ==
- Alice (voiced by Rebecca Husain) is a sassy 8-year-old girl who aspires to succeed in all of her endeavors.
- Unicorn (voiced by Chris Diamantopoulos) is a cheerful and energetic male unicorn who constantly causes all kinds of shenanigans, but ultimately comes through for Alice.
- Ollie (voiced by Varun Saranga) is an Indian-Canadian boy, whose father could spell in three languages in his native country as a child.
- Pixie (voiced by Josette Halpert) is a very happy-go-lucky girl who loves pink glitter, tossing it into the air every now and then.
- Hugo (voiced by Jennifer Hale) is Alice's baby brother.
- Tanya (voiced by Jennifer Hale) is Alice and Hugo's mom.
- Chuck (voiced by Chris Diamantopoulos) is Alice and Hugo's dad.

== Production ==
Go Away, Unicorn! was under development as a co-production between Tricon Films & Television via Tricon Kids & Family and Mercury Filmworks as of March 27, 2013 with Tricon as international distributor. The series was pick up by Disney Channels Worldwide and Corus Entertainment when Tricon was considered insolvent in December 2016. Sonar Entertainment purchased Tricon's assets including this series. By October 2017, Sonar and Nelvana began producing the planned 52 11-minute segments totaling 26 half-hour episodes, as well as 10 x one-minute shorts. The Canada Media Fund is aiding in the production of the series, while CentraIP is the worldwide licensing agent.

== Episodes ==
All episodes were directed by Jason Groh.

No.	Title	Written by	Storyboard by	Canadian air date	American air date	Prod. code	U.S. viewers (millions)
1a	"Bounce Away, Unicorn!"	Dan Signer	Kerry Sargent	September 7, 2018	March 3, 2019	101	N/A
A unicorn invites himself to Alice's birthday party.
1b	"Take a Dive, Unicorn!"	Dan Signer	Bradley Overall	September 7, 2018	March 3, 2019	102	N/A
Unicorn and Alice go to the aquarium to look at fish.
2a	"Get a Clue, Unicorn!"	Josh Sager & Jerome Simpson	Kirk Jorgensen	September 7, 2018	March 3, 2019	103	N/A
Unicorn and Alice go on a mystery to find Alice's missing toy.
2b	"Move Out, Unicorn!"	Dan Signer	Cory Wilson	September 7, 2018	March 3, 2019	104	N/A
Alice has second thoughts after kicking Unicorn out to hang out with Pixie.
3a	"Stop Babying Me, Unicorn!"	Evan Thaler Hickey	Kerry Sargent; Jung Ho Chang	September 15, 2018 (Note: "Stop Babying Me, Unicorn!" premiered as a sneak peek on January 15, 2019.)	March 10, 2019	105	0.31
Unicorn is bragging about how babysitting is so easy.
3b	"Take a Hike, Unicorn!"	Nathaniel Moher	Bradley Overall	September 15, 2018 (Note: "Take a Hike, Unicorn!" premiered as a sneak peek on January 21, 2019.)	March 10, 2019	106	0.31
Alice's family don't listen to her about having no electronics on the hike, not even Unicorn.
4a	"Kick It, Unicorn!"	Steph Kaliner	Kirk Jorgensen	September 16, 2018	March 10, 2019	107	0.29
Unicorn becomes a disaster to Alice's team, so Alice switches him with the other team.
4b	"Stop Stirring the Pot, Unicorn!"	Evan Thaler Hickey	Christopher Richard	September 16, 2018	March 10, 2019	108	0.29
Unicorn is scared after mistakingly claiming a chef is using "Unicorn Chowder".
5a	"Giddy Up, Unicorn!"	Nathaniel Moher	Kerry Sargent	September 22, 2018	March 17, 2019	109	0.30
Alice's plans to win the horse contest are ruined when Unicorn sends her horse on a cruise.
5b	"Go Away for a Spell, Unicorn!"	Nadiya Chettiar	Bradley Overall	September 22, 2018	March 17, 2019	110	0.30
All of the stuff Unicorn is doing to Ollie aren't helping him prepare for the Spelling Bee.
6a	"March Away, Unicorn!"	Josh Sager & Jerome Simpson	Kirk Jorgensen	September 23, 2018	March 17, 2019	111	0.28
Unicorn becomes a distraction to the marching band team.
6b	"Bow Out, Unicorn!"	Dan Signer	Christopher Richard	September 23, 2018	March 17, 2019	112	0.28
Alice's plans of doing karate and getting the brown belt are interrupted when Unicorn causes a disturbance to everyone.
7a	"Rap It Up, Unicorn!"	Steph Kaliner	Kerry Sargent	September 29, 2018	March 24, 2019	113	N/A
Alice doesn't know how to rap to save the convenience store.
7b	"Repeat After Me, Unicorn!"	Story by : Dan Signer; Teleplay by : Nathaniel Moher	Bradley Overall	September 29, 2018	March 24, 2019	114	N/A
Alice is sick, so she wants Unicorn to take over to get her accepted at the science studio.
8a	"Trick or Treat, Unicorn!"	Shawn Kalb	Kirk Jorgensen	October 20, 2018	October 27, 2019	115	N/A
Unicorn celebrates his first halloween.
8b	"Go Away, Frankencorn!"	Ken Cuperus	Christopher Richard	October 20, 2018	October 27, 2019	116	N/A
Alice makes Unicorn a new friend, which he dislikes at first but quickly becomes friends with afterwards.
9a	"Strut and Turn, Unicorn!"	Cole Bastedo	Kerry Sargent; Nicholas Hehn	September 30, 2018	March 24, 2019	117	N/A
Pixie and Alice are squabbling over what is best at a fashion show.
9b	"Roll On, Unicorn!"	Evan Thaler Hickey	Bradley Overall	September 30, 2018	March 24, 2019	118	N/A
Alice doesn't know how to ride a bike.
10a	"Make Like a Tree, Unicorn!"	Ashley Lannigan	Kirk Jorgensen	December 1, 2018	December 22, 2019	119	N/A
Unicorn is messing around whilst decorating the Christmas Tree.
10b	"Claus Out, Unicorn!"	Alex Ganetakos	Christopher Richard	December 1, 2018	December 22, 2019	120	N/A
Unicorn is disguised as Santa Claus.
11a	"Smarten Up, Unicorn!"	Steph Kaliner	Kerry Sargent	October 27, 2018	March 31, 2019	121	0.31
Unicorn finds Naja insufferable when she is "getting all the attention from Alice".
11b	"Go Away, Corné!"	Steph Kaliner	Bradley Overall	October 27, 2018	March 31, 2019	122	0.31
Unicorn is disguised as Corné to get the kids inside the art studio, which is for adults only.
12a	"Ready, Set, Go Away, Unicorn!"	Ashley Lannigan	Kirk Jorgensen	November 10, 2018	March 31, 2019	123	0.31
Unicorn doesn't help Alice and Tanya audition for their favourite reality game show.
12b	"Can't Touch This, Unicorn!"	Emer Connon	Christopher Richard	November 10, 2018	March 31, 2019	124	0.31
Alice and Chuck enter a father/daughter model building competition without telling Unicorn.
13a	"Swap 'Til You Drop, Unicorn!"	Story by : Dan Signer; Teleplay by : Nathaniel Moher	Kerry Sargent	November 24, 2018	April 7, 2019	125	0.34
Unicorn "accidentally" gives away Alice's toy to Chaz.
13b	"Grow Up, Unicorn!"	Jeremy Winkels	Bradley Overall	November 24, 2018	April 7, 2019	126	0.34
Unicorn only makes Hugo and the 3 triplet babies' play date worse.
14a	"Let It Slide, Unicorn!"	Ashley Lannigan	Kirk Jorgensen	December 8, 2018	April 7, 2019	127	0.34
Unicorn is too scared to get out of the way in the slide at the water park.
14b	"The Tooth Hurts, Unicorn!"	Mike McPhaden	Chris Richard	December 8, 2018	April 7, 2019	128	0.34
Unicorn believes that the tooth fairy would come.
15a	"Party On, Unicorn!"	Steph Kaliner	Brian Wong	December 22, 2018	April 14, 2019	129	0.32
Unicorn ruins everything at Tanya and Chuck's wedding party.
15b	"Quiet on the Set, Unicorn!"	Emer Connon	Nicholas Hehn; Bradley Overall	December 22, 2018	April 14, 2019	130	0.32
Alice and Unicorn make a movie about Marie Curie.
16a	"Dig This, Unicorn!"	Jeremy Winkels	Kirk Jorgensen	January 26, 2019	April 14, 2019	131	0.32
Alice, Unicorn and the gang attempt to "find a buried treasure".
16b	"Disappear, Unicorn!"	Steph Kaliner	Christopher Richard	January 26, 2019	April 14, 2019	132	0.32
Alice "accidentally" loses Unicorn's powers, so she tries to get them back.
17a	"Snap Out Of It, Unicorn!"	Shawn Kalb	Brian Wong	February 2, 2019	April 21, 2019	133	0.32
A hypnotiser "accidentally" hypnotises Unicorn.
17b	"Fix It Up, Unicorn!"	Mark Steinberg	Bradley Overall	February 2, 2019	April 21, 2019	134	0.32
Alice "accidentally" breaks Unicorn's horn, so she uses her powers to fix it.
18a	"This Is Tutu Much, Unicorn!"	Jocelyn Geddie	Kirk Jorgensen	March 9, 2019	April 21, 2019	135	0.32
Alice has to beat Chaz in ballet.
18b	"Get Real, Unicorn!"	Josh Saltzman	Christopher Richard	March 9, 2019	April 21, 2019	136	0.32
Alice has to "accidentally" prove that Unicorn is real.
19a	"Blast Off, Unicorn!"	Doug Hadders & Adam Rotstein	Brian Wong	March 16, 2019	April 28, 2019	137	0.30
Unicorn "accidentally" blasts everybody in outer space.
19b	"Stay Out, Unicorn!"	Mark De Angelis	Bradley Overall	March 16, 2019	April 28, 2019	138	0.30
The robot monitor of the house kicks Unicorn out.
20a	"Buzz Off, Unicorn!"	Nathaniel Moher	Kirk Jorgensen	March 23, 2019	April 28, 2019	139	0.30
Unicorn "accidentally" becomes the new Queen Bee.
20b	"There's No Escape, Unicorn!"	Mike McPhaden	Christopher Richard	March 23, 2019	April 28, 2019	140	0.30
Alice and Unicorn's entire family give up on an escape room by "accidentally" saying they give up.
21a	"Go Away, Unipox!"	Josh Saltzman	Mitch Manzer	March 30, 2019	May 5, 2019	141	0.30
Alice and her friend's attempt to "accidentally" cure Unicorn's chicken pox does not help matters one bit.
21b	"Quit Foolin' Around, Unicorn!"	Charles Johnston	Jung Ho Chang; Bradley Overall	March 30, 2019	May 5, 2019	142	0.30
Alice's pranks have gone too far!
22a	"Go Away, Tune-icorn!"	Alex Ganetakos	Kirk Jorgensen	April 27, 2019	May 12, 2019	143	0.30
Alice's attempt to sing and dance nonstop goes too far!
22b	"You've Been Flagged, Unicorn!"	Jocelyn Geddie	Christopher Richard	April 27, 2019	May 12, 2019	144	0.30
Alice has to play the flag game with her worst enemy... CHAZ!
23a	"Snow Away, Unicorn!"	Jeremy Winkels	Mitch Munzer	May 4, 2019	May 19, 2019	145	0.25
Unicorn "accidentally" brings a snowman to life... LITERALLY!
23b	"Lead the Way, Unicorn!"	Grant Sauvé	Bradley Overall	May 4, 2019	May 19, 2019	146	0.25
The fact that Alice and her 3 best friends have gone on a racing toboggan goes too far... LITERALLY!
24a	"Ready or Bot, Unicorn!"	Evan Thaler Hickey	Kirk Jorgensen	May 18, 2019	June 2, 2019	147	0.29
Unicorn "accidentally" breaks Alice's robot just for her to "win the contest".
24b	"Pig Out, Unicorn!"	Alex Ganetakos	Christopher Richard	May 18, 2019	June 2, 2019	148	0.29
Unicorn and the guinea pig both go away.
25a	"Dream On, Unicorn!"	Alex Ganetakos	Mitch Manzer	May 25, 2019	June 9, 2019	149	0.34
Alice and Unicorn's dreams come true... LITERALLY!
25b	"You Rule, Unicorn!"	Evan Thaler Hickey	Bradley Overall	May 25, 2019	June 9, 2019	150	0.34
Unicorn's rules go too far!
26a	"Big Surprise, Unicorn!"	Evan Thaler Hickey	Kirk Jorgensen	June 8, 2019	June 16, 2019	151	0.27
Alice and her 3 best friends try to find the missing Bigfoot.
26b	"Go Away, Alice!"	Alex Ganetakos	Christopher Richard	June 8, 2019	June 16, 2019	152	0.27
In the series finale, Alice wants to discover Unicorn and his new dragon friend's plans at all costs.

== Broadcast ==
The show broadcast worldwide but premiere in the third quarter of 2018 on YTV in Canada before an international roll out. The series was also shown on Teletoon's French counterpart Télétoon.

In the United States, Go Away, Unicorn! aired from March 3 to December 22, 2019 on Disney Channel.

== Merchandise ==
Toys have been licensed worldwide by Jazwares, and were scheduled for release during fall 2019.
