= Jon Cor =

Canadian actor

- Born: November 17, 1984 (age 41); Timmins, Ontario, Canada
- Occupations: Actor, author
- Years active: 2005–present
- Website: www.joncorofficial.com

Jon Cor (born November 17, 1984) is a Canadian actor and author, best known for playing Hodge Starkweather in Shadowhunters: The Mortal Instruments, Brick in Total Drama: Revenge of the Island, Chillblaine in The Flash, and Ryan in Saw 3D.

== Early life ==
Cor studied theatre arts at Fanshawe College.

== Career ==
He is known for playing the role of Jake in Beaver Falls, Brick in Total Drama Revenge of the Island, Zach Creed in Being Erica, Jake Byers in The Boy She Met Online, Hodge Starkweather in Shadowhunters: The Mortal Instruments, and Saw 3D as Ryan.

Cor appeared on The Flash as Mark Blaine / Chillblaine, initially in a recurring role in seventh and eighth seasons before he was promoted to main cast for the ninth season.

=== Writing ===
In 2004, Cor wrote the novel In Heat.

== Filmography ==
=== Films ===
Year	Title	Role	Notes
2006	American Pie Presents: The Naked Mile	Trent	
2007	Matters of Life & Dating	Rocky	TV movie
2008	The Rocker	Paul	
2008	The Tenth Circle	Seth	TV movie
2008	Nothing Really Matters	70's Icon	
2008	Growing Op	Philip	
2009	Stripped Naked	Jack	
2010	The Boy She Met Online	Jake Meyers	
2010	H.M.S.: White Coat	Zack Fisher	
2010	Saw 3D	Ryan	
2010	Forbidden Fruit	Adam	short
2014	Patch Town	Sergei	
2014	Teen Lust	Brad	
2015	The Perfect Girlfriend	Brandon Moore	
2018	Trouble in the Garden	Colin	
2019	Goliath	Garrett Walker	
2019	Dating a Sociopath	Brian	

=== TV ===
Year	Title	Role	Notes
2005–07	Life with Derek	James Burton	Episodes: "The party" (2005) "Things That Go Bump in the Night" (2007)
2008	Murdoch Mysteries	Pearson	Episode: "Still Waters"
2008	Degrassi: The Next Generation	Tom Blake	Episodes: "Uptown Girl: Part 1" & "Part 2"
2009–11	Being Erica	Zach Creed	5 episodes
2011	Suits	Tom Keller	Episode: "Errors and Omissions"
2011–12	Beaver Falls	Jake	12 episodes
2012	Being Human	Connor McLean	Episodes: "(I Loathe You) For Sentimental Reasons" "Addicted to Love" "Mama Said There'd Be Decades Like These" "The Ties That Blind"
2012	Total Drama: Revenge of the Island	Brick (voice)	8 episodes
2012	Skatoony	Brick (voice)	Episode: "Vikings"
2013	Defiance	Lamu	Episode: "The Bride Wore Black"
2014	Played	Adam	Episode: "Webisode: 'Made' - Maria"
2014	Spun Out	Adam Brixton	Episode: "Mad About Beckett"
2014	The Listener	JJ Jones	Episode: "The Lockup"
2015	Dark Matter	Vons	Episodes: #1.10 & #1.11
2016–17	Shadowhunters: The Mortal Instruments	Hodge Starkweather	Recurring (Season 1); Guest (Season 2) 10 episodes
2017	Supernatural	Wraith	Episode: "Patience"
2018	Love On Safari	Tom Anderson	Television film (Hallmark)
2019	Picture Perfect Mysteries: Newlywed and Dead	Greg Adams	Television Film (Hallmark)
2019	Picture A Perfect Christmas	David	Television Film (Hallmark)
2018–2019	Lost in Space	Resolute Officer	3 episodes
2020	Christmas On The Vine	Tyler Lockwood	Television Film (Lifetime)
2021	Crossword Mysteries: Riddle Me Dead	Hunter Hall	Television Film (Hallmark)
2021	Love at the Ranch (AKA Love at Cedar Creek)	Hank	Television Film
2022	The Way to the Heart	Logan	Television Film
2021–2023	The Flash	Mark Blaine / Chillblaine	Recurring role (Season 7–8); Main role (Season 9) 26 episodes
