= Ashley Botting =

Canadian actress

Ashley Botting is a Canadian actress, comedian and writer. She is most noted for her work as part of the writing team for This Hour Has 22 Minutes, who collectively won the Canadian Screen Award for Best Writing in a Variety or Sketch Comedy Program or Series at the 12th Canadian Screen Awards in 2024.

She began her career with the Toronto company of The Second City, appearing in shows such as Bird Flu Over the Cuckoo's Nest, Tazed and Confused, Stephen Harper! The Musical, Sixteen Scandals, and How to Kill a Comedian. In 2020 she directed the livestreamed CERB Your Enthusiasm, the last show ever to be produced from Second City's Mercer Street theatre before the company moved to York Street in 2022.

She has also been a regular contributor with The Bad Dog Theatre Company, appearing in shows such as Troubadour, Holiday! An Improvised Musical, and her own Ashley with a Y. With the cast of Holiday! An Improvised Musical, she was a Dora Mavor Moore Award nominee for Outstanding Performance by an Ensemble, Musical Theatre, in 2024.

She has also had voice acting roles in the animated series BeyWheelz, Z-Squad, Arthur, Total Drama Presents: The Ridonculous Race, Odd Squad and Trailer Park Boys: The Animated Series, and has had guest appearances in Schitt's Creek, The Beaverton and What We Do in the Shadows. She has written for Odd Squad, Because News and The Snoopy Show.
