= Barbara Mamabolo =

Canadian actress and singer (born 1985)

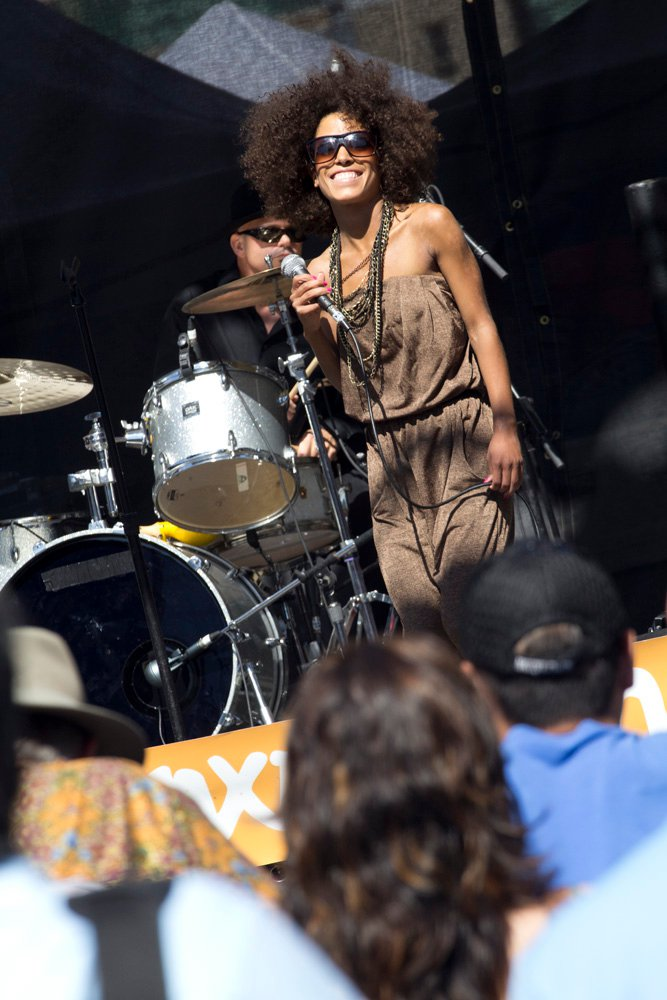
- Mamabolo performing At Yonge and Dundas Square in 2011
- Born: November 30, 1985 (age 40); Toronto, Ontario, Canada
- Occupations: Actress, singer
- Years active: 1998–present
- Spouse: Rob Stefaniuk (m. 2016)
- Children: 1

Barbara Mamabolo (born November 30, 1985) is a Canadian actress and singer.

== Career ==
Mamabolo has made guest-star appearances on the critically acclaimed series The Eleventh Hour, Sue Thomas: F.B. Eye, and Relic Hunter. Her stage credits include the role of Becky at the Tarragon Theatre's production of The Little Princess, a principal role in Ross Petty's Peter Pan at the Elgin Theatre, Dorothy in the Leah Polsun Theatre's production of The Wizard of Oz, and a member of the ensemble cast of Judy and David in Concert at the Ford Centre. She also played the role of Jude Harrison's best friend, Katarina "Kat" Benton, in first season of the hit CTV teen drama television series, Instant Star. Mamabolo also appeared, albeit briefly, in two episodes of the television drama, MVP. Mamabolo's most recent movie appearance as of 2006 was in 5ive Girls. She played the role of Carla's minion Robin in Disney's 2004 teen comedy film Confessions of a Teenage Drama Queen, alongside Lindsay Lohan and Megan Fox.

Mamabolo has since moved on to a variety of television series, including starring as the title character of the YTV television series Zixx. She has appeared in children's sci-fi series Mentors as Glay and co-hosts education travel series Get Outta Town. She also voices Boo Boo in the animated television series Ruby Gloom, Scoop in Oh No! It's an Alien Invasion, Lydia Fox on Arthur, and Zoey & Millie in Total Drama.

Barbara Mamabolo was nominated for the 2003 Annual Young Artist Awards for Best Performance in a TV Drama Series - Guest Starring Young Actress for The Zack Files.

She also voices Cynder in the video game Skylanders: Spyro's Adventure (2011).

Mamabolo has released her first record with her band Mamabolo entitled "Falling to Pieces". The band has toured with Men Without Hats and has performed at the NXNE and Montreal Jazz Festivals. Barbara Mamabolo performed one of the band's singles, "Night After Night", in the 2009 film Suck.

== Filmography ==
=== Film ===
Year	Title	Role	Notes
1999	Revelation	Davis' Daughter	
1999	The Wishing Tree	Celia	
2003	Fast Food High	Tiffany	
2004	Confessions of a Teenage Drama Queen	Robin	
2006	5ive Girls	Leah	
2009	Suck	Danielle	
2015	Anxietyville	Claire	
2015	Born to Be Blue	Janelle	

=== Television ===
Year	Title	Role	Notes
1999	Dangerous Evidence: The Lori Jackson Story	Dena Collier	Television film
2000	Falcone	Nina Patterson	2 episodes
2000	Livin' for Love: The Natalie Cole Story	Pam	Television film
2000	Dear America: Color Me Dark	Rosie Hamilton	Television film
2001	A Mother's Fight for Justice	Little Jo	Television film
2001	Soul Food	Darlene	Episode: "Life Lessons"
2001	Relic Hunter	Samantha	Episode: "Treasure Island"
2001	The Zack Files	Emily	2 episodes
2002	Tru Confessions	Ali	Television film
2002	Degrassi: The Next Generation	Older Girl at Party	Episode: "Shout: Part 1"
2003	Beautiful Girl	Cathy Farwell	Television film
2003	Missing	Private Anna Hicks	Episode: "Basic Training"
2004–2005	Strange Days at Blake Holsey High	Tara	4 episodes
2004	The Eleventh Hour	Nicole	Episode: "Hard Seven"
2004	Zixx	Zixx Phunkee Zee	13 episodes
2004	Brave New Girl	Angel	Television film
2004	Man in the Mirror: The Michael Jackson Story	Janet Jackson	Television film
2004	Sue Thomas: F.B.Eye	Anita	Episode: "The Body Shop"
2006	Zoé Kézako	Voice	3 episodes
2004–2006	Instant Star	Kat Benton	15 episodes
2004–2007	Renegadepress.com	Carmen	9 episodes
2004–2010	Franny's Feet	Additional voices	6 episodes
2005	Beautiful People	Zoe	4 episodes
2005	Zixx: Level Two	Zixx	Episode: "Guardian of the Golden Gate"
2006–2008	Ruby Gloom	Boo Boo	20 episodes
2006–2008	6teen	Marlowe	7 episodes
2008	MVP	Zyth	Episode: "Game On"
2009	Zixx: Level Three	Zixx	13 episodes
2009	The Listener	Franny Petrie	Episode: "Iris"
2009	Bob & Doug	Juliet LeDeux	Episode: "Bob Falls in Love"
2009	Flashpoint	Trudy Vargas	Episode: "Exit Wounds"
2009–2013	Beyblade: Metal Fusion	Madoka	141 episodes
2010, 2015	Arthur	Lydia Gordon	2 episodes
2010–2011	Bakugan Battle Brawlers	Zenet Surrow	9 episodes
2012	Total Drama: Revenge of the Island	Zoey	13 episodes
2012	Skatoony	Zoey	Episode: "Stoopid Santa"
2013	Total Drama: All-Stars	Zoey	12 episodes; voice absent in "Food Fright"
2013	Oh No! It's an Alien Invasion	Scoop	40 episodes
2013	State of Syn	Lux	5 episodes
2013–2014	Beyblade: Shogun Steel	Madoka	26 episodes
2014	The Divide	Nina	Episode: "Never Forget"
2015	MsLabelled	Rumi	15 episodes
2016	My 90-Year-Old Roommate	Amanda	2 episodes
2017	Haunters: The Musical	Iggy	18 episodes
2018	Mysticons	Vesper	Episode: "Scream of the Banshee"
2019	Star Trek: Short Treks	Bounty Hunter	Episode: "The Escape Artist"
2019	Bakugan: Battle Planet	Various voices	6 episodes
2020–2021	Hero Elementary	Jada / Jada's Mom / Scout	4 episodes
2023-2024	Total Drama Island	Millie	18 episodes
