= Tyrone Savage =

Canadian actor (born 1985)

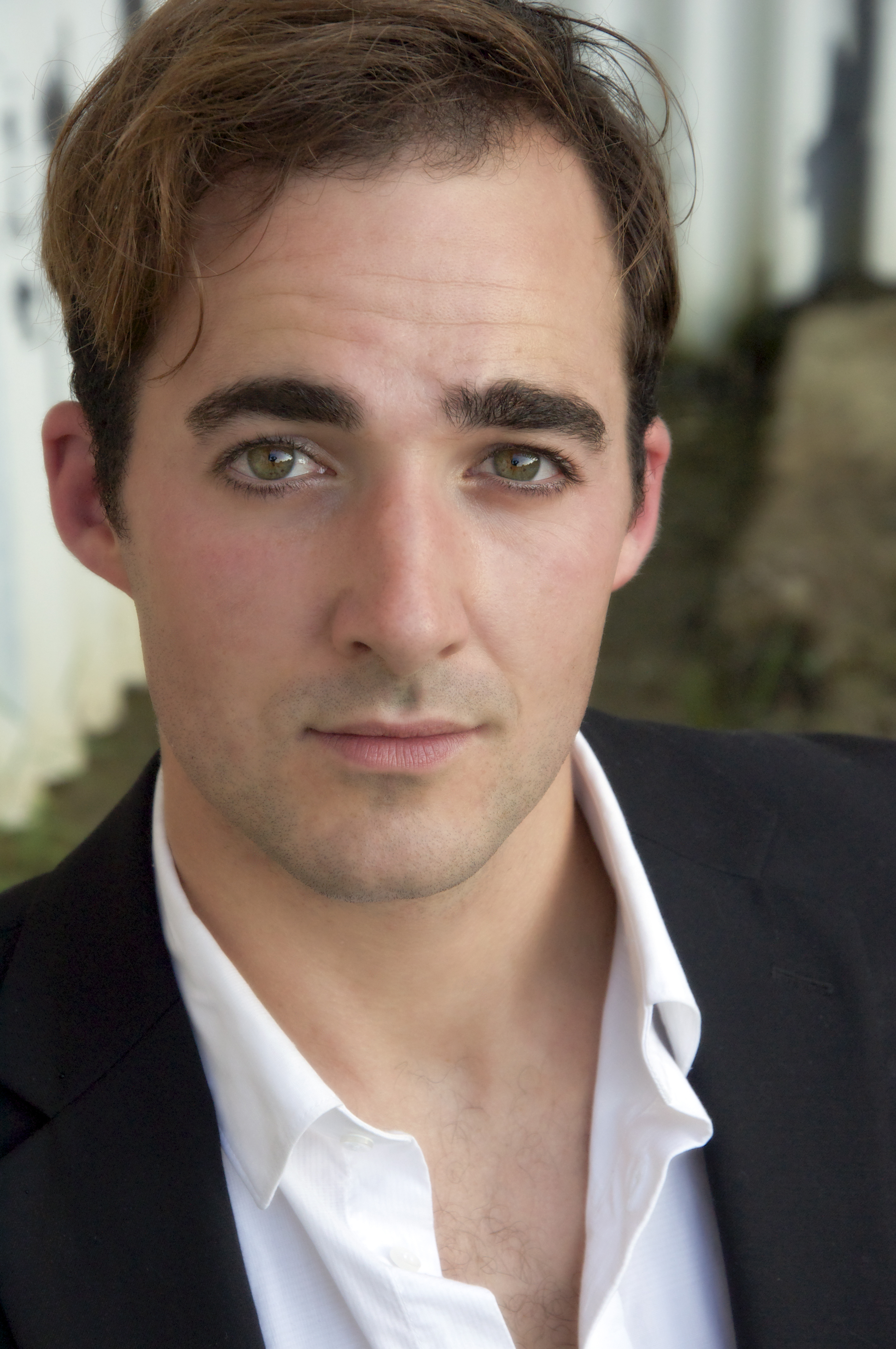
- Savage in 2013
- Born: May 15, 1985 (age 41); Toronto, Ontario, Canada
- Occupations: Actor, director
- Years active: 1995–present
- Parents: Booth Savage (father); Janet-Laine Green (mother)

Tyrone Savage (born May 15, 1985) is a Canadian actor and director. He is the son of actor Booth Savage and Janet-Laine Green. He provided the voices of Matthias in Redwall and Lightning in Total Drama.

== Filmography ==
=== Film ===
Year	Title	Role	Notes
2000	Learning to Swim	Boy	
2007	American Pie Presents: Beta House	Edgar Willis	
2020	Learning to Love Again	Greg	

=== Television ===
Year	Title	Role	Notes
1996–2001	Wind at My Back	Fat Bailey	65 episodes
1998–1999	Mythic Warriors	Youing Achilles (voice)	2 episodes
1999	Tales from the Cryptkeeper	Evan Wagner (voice)	1 episode
1999–2002	Redwall	Matthias (voice)	28 episodes
2000	Anne of Green Gables: The Animated Series	Orville (voice)	1 episode
2000–2003	Franklin	Jack Rabbit (voice)	3 episodes
2001	A Wind At My Back Christmas	Fat Bailey	TV movie
2002	Sagwa, the Chinese Siamese Cat	Additional Voices	1 episode
2006–2007	Z-Squad	Cal (voice)	26 episodes
2010–2011	Bakugan: Gundalian Invaders	Linus Claude / Sein Pam (voice)	English dub 9 episodes
2011	Bakugan: Mechtanium Surge	Coredegon / Mechtavius Destroyer (voice)	English dub
2012	Total Drama: Revenge of the Island	Lightning (voice)	13 episodes
2012	Skatoony	Lightning (voice)	1 episode
2013	Total Drama: All-Stars	Lightning (voice)	3 episodes
2014	Grojband	DJ Fusion (voice)	1 episode
2019; 2024	The Dragon Prince	Lainr (voice)	2 episodes

=== Video games ===
Year	Title	Voice role	Notes
2018	Assassin's Creed Odyssey	Alkibiades	
2020	Immortals Fenyx Rising	Fenyx	
