= Varun Saranga =

Canadian actor

- Saranga at Dragon Con in 2026
- Occupation: Actor
- Years active: 2009–present
- Children: 1

Varun Saranga is a Canadian actor and filmmaker, most noted for his regular role as Jeremy Chetri in the television series Wynonna Earp.

== Career ==
Saranga began his career as a child actor playing Indie's older brother A.J. in the teen sitcom How to Be Indie. In 2014 he had a supporting role in the television miniseries The Best Laid Plans.

In 2017, he appeared in the horror television film Neverknock as the love interest of Kiana Madeira's lead character. In 2019 he joined the cast of Burden of Truth in a regular role in the second season as Noah Achari.

In 2023, he had a recurring role as Alvin Canada in the television sitcom Shelved and was also the lead of the holiday romantic comedy series on The Roku Channel called The Holiday Shift.

In 2026, he appeared in the horror film Ready or Not 2: Here I Come, playing Madhu Rajan, with critics praising his performance for "some truly terrific timing, lightening up even some of the most violent sequences."

He is an alumnus of the Actors Conservatory program at the Canadian Film Centre, and has also directed a number of short films.

== Filmography ==
=== Film ===
| Year | Title | Role | Notes |
|---|---|---|---|
| 2016 | Russet Season | Will | Short Film |
| 2018 | eHero | Wayne Levin | |
| 2018 | Softcore | Corey | Short Film |
| 2018 | Amityville Witch Activity | Varun | Short Film |
| 2018 | Appiness | Raj | |
| 2022 | Daniel's Gotta Die | Carter | |
| 2022 | The Baker | Mani | |
| 2023 | Fingernails | Garth | |
| 2024 | Don't Forget | Grant | Short Film |
| 2024 | A Thousand Cuts | Lex | |
| 2026 | Ready or Not 2: Here I Come | Madhu Rajan | |

=== Television ===
| Year | Title | Role | Notes |
|---|---|---|---|
| 2009–2011 | How to Be Indie | AJ Mehta | 27 episodes |
| 2009 | Cra$h & Burn | Amar Bhutta | Episode: "Trust" |
| 2010 | Unnatural History | Daveed | Episode: "Public School Enemies" |
| 2011 | Mudpit | Kid Customer | Episode: "Muzika's Most Wanted" |
| 2012 | Bunks | Sanjay | Television film |
| 2013 | Lucky 7 | Malik | 2 episodes |
| 2014 | The Best Laid Plans | Pete 2 | 6 episodes |
| 2015 | Young Drunk Punk | Naseef | Episode: "Sound Judgement" |
| 2017 | Save Me | Sohail | Episode: "H.B.D." |
| 2017 | Orphan Black | Neal | Episode: "Let the Children and Childbearers Toil" |
| 2017 | Odd Squad | Over Easy | Episode: "The Breakfast Club/Dr. O: Party Time, Excellent" |
| 2017 | People of Earth | Kevin, Motel clerk | Episode: "Gerry's Return" |
| 2017 | Dark Haven High | Mr. Zing | Episode: "The Lizard of Ooze" |
| 2017 | Neverknock | Gavin | Television film |
| 2017–2018 | Schitt's Creek | Gary | 2 episodes |
| 2017–2018 | Workin' Moms | Chad | 8 episodes |
| 2017–2021 | Wynonna Earp | Jeremy Chetri | 35 episodes |
| 2018 | Killer High | Ronnie | Television film |
| 2018–2019 | Carter | Vijay Gill | 7 episodes |
| 2018–2019 | Go Away, Unicorn! | Ollie | Voice role, 42 episodes |
| 2019 | Adventures in Casting | Camera operator | 3 episodes |
| 2019 | Burden of Truth | Noah Achari | 5 episodes |
| 2020 | Nurses | Dev Sikka | 3 episodes |
| 2021 | Hudson & Rex | Levi Gill / Armie Modi | Episode: "The Secret Life of Levi" |
| 2021 | Endlings | Noah Fossey | 9 episodes |
| 2021–2022 | Strays | Ravi | 5 episodes |
| 2022 | The Kids in the Hall | Intern | 1 episode |
| 2022 | Coroner | Rohan Arjune | Episode: "True Crime" |
| 2022–2023 | Sort Of | Ismail "Izzy" | 9 episodes |
| 2023 | Shelved | Alvin Canada | 7 episodes |
| 2023 | The Holiday Shift | Sam | 5 episodes |
| 2023 | SurrealEstate | Zayan Wali | Episode: "Dearly Departed" |
| 2023–2024 | Total Drama Island | Raj | Voice role, 22 episodes |
| 2024 | Wynonna Earp: Vengeance | Jeremy Chetri | TV Special |
| 2025 | Brilliant Minds | Thomas | Episode: "The Doctors Graveyard" |
| 2026 | Slo Pitch | Roy | 3 episodes |
