= Christian Potenza =

Canadian actor

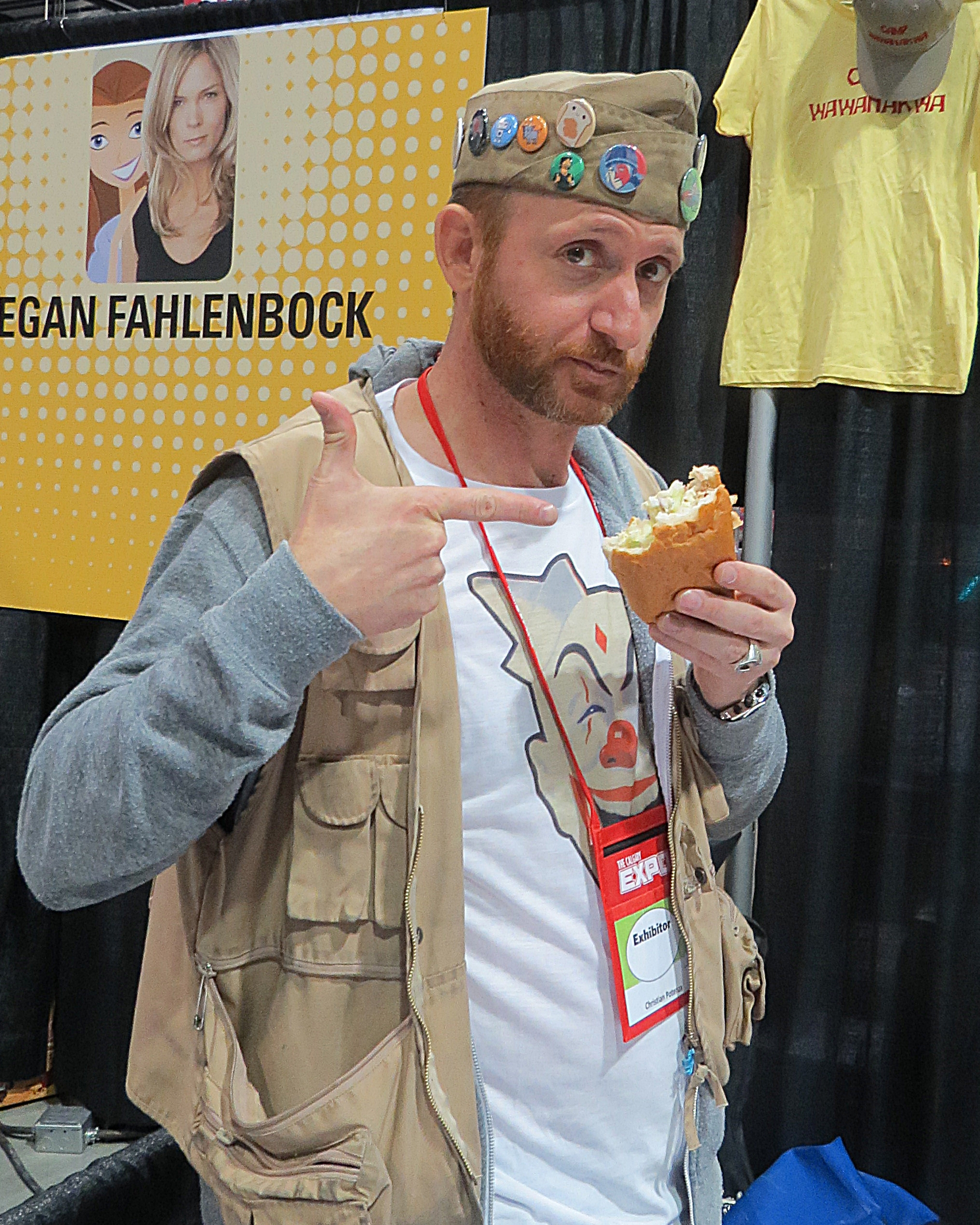
- Potenza in 2014
- Born: Anthony Christian Potenza; Ottawa, Ontario, Canada
- Occupations: Actor; comedian
- Years active: 1997–present
- Spouse: Edie Inksetter (m. 1997; div. 2000)
- Children: 1

Anthony Christian Potenza is a Canadian actor, comedian and teacher. He has voiced Jude Lizowski on 6teen as well as Brando Beaver and both of the Bison Brothers in Pikwik Pack. From 2007 to 2022, Potenza was the voice actor for Chris McLean in Total Drama.

== Early life ==
Potenza was born in Ottawa, Ontario to Anne (née Clement) and Joseph Potenza.

== Career ==
Potenza has been on television since 1997, when he first appeared in the television series Riverdale as the character Jimmy.

His performances include appearing as Doug in the CBC Television hockey comedy series The Tournament, as well as CSA Agent Joel in the 2002 Jackie Chan movie The Tuxedo. Most of Potenza's roles are in television commercials, including a giant yellow toothbrush in the "evil gingivitis" commercials for Listerine, a dog in the Fido commercials "The Office" and "The Promotion", as well as a sunflower in Canadian Kia ads. He performed the voice for Jude Lizowski on 6teen; another cartoon character is Trevor Troublemeyer on the show Sidekick. He also guest starred in the show Grojband as Party Danimal and performed the voice for Chris McLean in the Total Drama series.

He also appeared in an episode of Colin and Justin's Home Heist in 2007, in which the suburban Oakville home he shares with his daughter Teagan was remodelled.

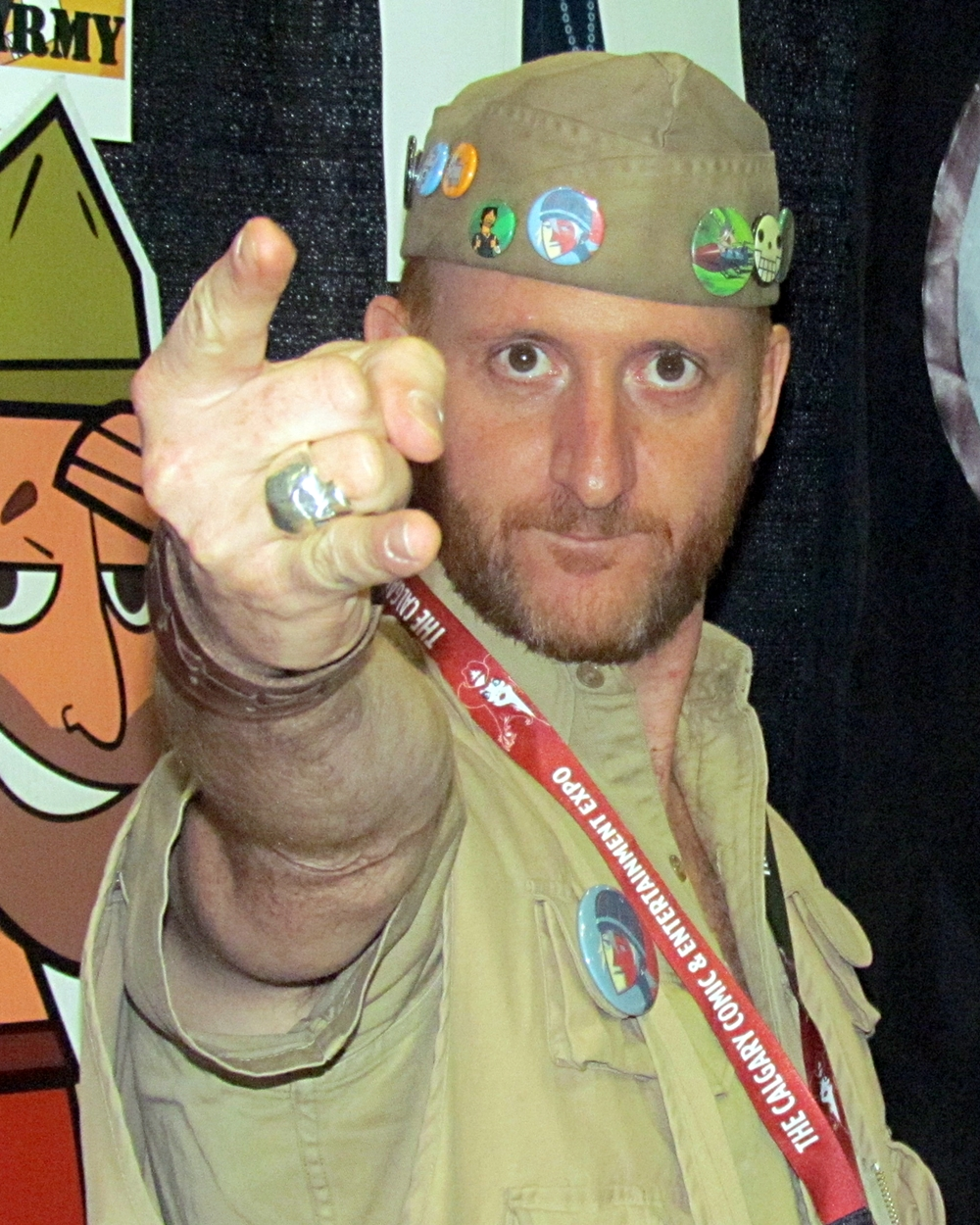
Potenza in 2012

Potenza also portrays Ryan Archer in the web series But I'm Chris Jericho!. He is the voice of Brando Beaver and both of the Bison Brothers in Pikwik Pack.

His YouTube channel, The Infinity Forge (originally called "SwitchBoardNetwork"), largely features videos of his experiences as a voice actor for Teletoon, and has gathered a respectable fan following. He has also guest-starred on various independent animated series on YouTube.

In 2024, Potenza hosted a bi-weekly segment on The Corcoran Entertainment Show, where he and his co-host Franky Corcoran pitched content ideas from a series of guests.

== Personal life ==
=== Allegations ===
In February 2022, Potenza was accused of drugging and sexually assaulting his acting students in a Facebook post by actress Sonya Côté. These allegations gained publicity in March 2023 when it was announced that Potenza would not be returning as the voice of Chris McLean in the Total Drama revival, having been replaced by Terry McGurrin.

In January 2024, Potenza addressed the allegations on The Corcoran Entertainment Show, naming Sonya Côté directly and denying all accusations, claiming she had orchestrated a calculated smear campaign to damage his reputation and take over his studio, after he had refused to let her draw pornography in his classroom. Côté has not publicly responded in detail to Potenza's statements, and the allegations have not resulted in confirmed legal proceedings as of 2026, as none of Potenza's students have ever come forward to corroborate Côté's claims. Potenza has since returned to both teaching and acting, while Côté has, seemingly, closed most of her social media accounts.

== Filmography ==
=== Film ===
Year	Title	Role
1999	Forever Mine	Corrections Officer
2002	The Tuxedo	CSA Agent Joel
2003	The Arbuckle Academy	Bobby
2004	Ham & Cheese yum yum	Patt Watts
2004	My Brother's Keeper aka Le Sang du frère (Canada: French title)	Dave
2005	King's Ransom	Officer Holland
2005	A Wing and a Prayer	Barry
2005	The White Dog Sacrifice	Rob
2005	Neil	Homeless Man
2006	Run Robot Run!	Garth
2006	Population 436	Frank Ramsey
2011	Moon Point	Rick
2011	Sharpay's Fabulous Adventure	Mic Tech Guy
2013	Bunks	Crawl
2014	Daisy, A Hen into the Wild	Mayor/Mr. Otter
2014	Shelby	Uncle Stephen
2021	V/H/S/94 (Segment Storm Drain)	Cameraman Jeff

=== Television ===
Year	Title	Episode	Role
1997	Riverdale		Jimmy
1998	Naked City: Justice with a Bullet		Rudy
1999	La Femme Nikita aka Nikita (Canada: English title)	"Any Means Necessary"	Reuben
2000	The Famous Jett Jackson	"Beauregard's Beach Bash"	Deputy Spencer
2000	Hendrix		Chas Chandler
2000	One Kill		Parker
2000	The Thin Blue Lie		Danny O'Brien
2000	Twice in a Lifetime	"Birds of Paradise"	Young Barry Kirkbride
2001	Degrassi: The Next Generation	"The Mating Game"	Cashier
2001	The Famous Jett Jackson	"Battle of Wilsted"	Deputy Spencer
2001	Leap Years	5 episodes	Lighting Guy
2002	Escape from the Newsroom		Chris
2002	Patti		
2002–2003	Moville Mysteries		Gizzard Gizersky (voice)
2003	The One	Bill	
2003–2004	Foolish Girl		Punk Rock Boyfriend (voice)
2004	The Eggs	2 episodes	The Monos
2004–2010	6teen	All	Jude Lizowski (voice)
2005	Funpak	Not-So-Superheroic Adventures of Sidekick shorts only	Trevor Troublemeyer
2005	The Tournament		Doug
2005	The Shakespeare Comedy Show	Episode #1.2	
2007	Ten Seconds		Friend
2007–2014	Total Drama	All (except "Are We There Yeti?", TDA Aftermaths II & III, and TDWT Aftermaths)	Chris McLean, Jerd McLean (voices)
2008–2010	Stoked	"Take Your Kook to Work Day" "Grand Theft Whale Bus"	Shep, Announcer guy (voices)
2010–2011	Jimmy Two-Shoes	"Everyone Can Whistle", "Heloise's Secret Admirer"	Peep (voice)
2010–2013	Sidekick	All	Trevor Troublemeyer (voice)
2011–2013	Almost Naked Animals		Dirk Danger (voice)
2011	Detentionaire		Zed, The Skaters (voices)
2011, 2013	Scaredy Squirrel	"Life Slaver", "Stack to School"	Viking, Bobby Lovelife (voice)
2012	Murdoch Mysteries	"Back and to the Left"	Jack "Shoeless Jack" Leary
2013	Skatoony	"Pop Video"	Chris McLean, Doug (voices)
2013	Last Car Standing	All	Himself (host)
2013–2014	Grojband	"Pox N' Roll", "Grin Reaper"	Party Danimal (voice)
2017–2018	Wishfart	All	Neptune (voice)
2018	Carter	"Voiceover"	Clifford
2018–2022	Total DramaRama	Main Role/Episodes: "Broken Back Kotter", "A Hole Lot of Trouble"	Jude Lizowski, Chris McLean (voices)
2019–2021	Norman Picklestripes		Additional voices
2020–2021	Pikwik Pack		Bison Bros (voice)
2022	Transformers: BotBots		Clogstopper (voice)

== Awards and nominations ==
Year	Award	Category	Work	Result
2005	Gemini Awards	Best Ensemble Performance in a Comedy Program or Series	The Tournament ("The Warrior Women")	Nominated
2006	Gemini Awards	Best Ensemble Performance in a Comedy Program or Series	The Tournament ("Saturday at the Tournament")	Nominated
2008	Gemini Awards	Best Individual or Ensemble Performance in an Animated Program or Series	6Teen ("Silent Butt Deadly")	Nominated
2015	Canadian Screen Awards	Best Performance in a Children's or Youth Program or Series	Total Drama All Stars ("Hero vs Villains")	Nominated
