= Cake Entertainment =

Family and kids' entertainment company

Cake Entertainment Limited
- Formerly: Cake Distribution
- Type: Private
- Industry: Entertainment
- Founded: 2002; 24 years ago
- Headquarters: London, England, UK
- Area served: Worldwide
- Key people: Edward Galton
- Services: Production; Distribution
- Divisions: Cake Distribution; Cake Production
- Subsidiaries: CakeStart Entertainment (joint-venture with Kickstart Entertainment)
- Website: cakeentertainment.com

Cake Entertainment Limited (stylised as CAKE, formerly Cake Distribution) is a British independent company that specializes in the production, distribution, financing and development of kids' and family entertainment brands.

== History ==
CAKE works with producers of animation and live-action content, including Rovio Entertainment Ltd, Ragdoll Productions, Fresh TV, Channel X and Animation Collective.

In addition, CAKE partners with production companies such as Anima Estudios (Space Chickens in Space for Disney EMEA), Paper Owl Films (Pablo for CBeebies), TeamTO (Angelo Rules, Mighty Mike),(Fun Street), Thuristar (Mush-Mush and the Mushables), Cheeky Little Media and Kickstart Entertainment co-producing new entertainment material and developing these brands.

In late-March 2006, Cake Entertainment had entered the distribution activities by partnering with Dutch development & production company Hoek, Line & Thinker to form a joint-venture distribution division called Cake Distribution with Tom van Waveren becoming president of the new distribution arm.

In December 2009, Cake Entertainment entered the video platform service by partnering with young animator Junior Jesman and London-based animation production studio Blue Zoo Animation Studio to develop & produce an animated web series entitled If I Was... for French streaming network Dailymotion with Blue Zoo Animation Studio would provide & develop animation services while Cake Entertainment would distribute the series online.

At the start of September 2010, Genevieve Dexter who had co-founded British entertainment & distribution company Cake Entertainment had sold her majority stake of the distribution company Cake Entertainment to co-founder & co-director of the company Tom van Waveren.

In 2011, Spanish producer Zinkia Entertainment acquired a 51% majority stake in CAKE, who became the licensor for various Zinkia properties including Pocoyo. The stake was purchased back by the Cake's management in July 2014 after Zinkia Entertainment entered administration.

In March 2017, Cake Entertainment teamed up with Australian animation production company Studio Moshi to establish a joint-venture Irish animation production company based in Dublin called Gingerbread Animation with the new Irish joint venture animation production studio would produce & develop its own animated series whilst Cake Entertainment would handle distribution to Gingerbread Animation's productions as the new joint venture animation studio would also handle production services for third-party companies.

In 2018, Cake was most voted "Best International Distributor" by Animation Magazine and No 2 Distributor in Kidscreen’s 2018 Hot50.

In March 2021, Cake Entertainment announced a restructure of its operations with them creating its own in-house production arm called Cake Productions Ltd that would support an increasing volume of its development and production activities such as Supa Team 4 whilst Cake Entertainment would distribute its upcoming in-house productions from its production division Cake Productions Ltd as the company had also restructured its distribution services with its co-founder & CEO Tom van Waveren stepping down his role at Cake Entertainment after 15 years as Cake Entertainment's CCO and managing director Ed Galton had become the new CEO of Cake Entertainment whilst its financial director Cat Seddon became Cake's newly created COO role.

In May 2021, Cake Entertainment announced it had partnered with Canadian animation studio & production company Kickstart Entertainment with the establishment of their joint-venture production company named CakeStart Entertainment that would develop and produce kids & family live-action films and television series with former Disney Branded Television original series alum Kory Lunsford leading the joint-venture production company CakeStart Entertainment as its president whilst Cake Entertainment would handle distribution to CakeStart's productions worldwide.

In 2024, Cake acquired the brand and back catalogue of Jetpack Distribution, which was liquidated and closed down a month earlier.

In June 2026, Cake announced that it had partnered with TV Asahi to secure exclusive distribution rights to the Doraemon anime catalogue globally outside Asia, as well as to produce new English dubs of the series. The deal excludes rights in Italy (held by CPLG), Türkiye (held by Animation International), Spain and Portugal (held by LUK Internacional).

== Distribution ==
=== Pre-school/Bridge ===
- Aesop's Theater
- B.O.T. and The Beasties
- Charlie and Lola
- Ella Bella Bingo
- Ellen's Acres
- Get Well Soon
- Kiddets
- Kiri and Lou
- Lah-Lah's Adventures
- Lucas the Spider
- Pablo
- Pete the Cat
- The Razzberry Jazzberry Jam
- Ready Jet Go!
- Space Racers
- Tiny Planets
- Tish Tash
- Toby's Travelling Circus
- Tom and the Slice of Bread with Strawberry Jam and Honey
- Wanda and the Alien
- Weather Hunters
- The WotWots
- Woozle & Pip

=== 6-12 ===
- Abominable Christmas
- Angelo Rules
- Angry Birds Blues
- Angry Birds Stella
- Angry Birds Toons
- Clay Kids
- Dear Dracula
- Dennis the Menace and Gnasher
- Doodlez
- Eliot Kid
- Frozen in Time
- Fun Street
- Hareport
- HTDT
- Jorel's Brother
- Kappa Mikey
- King Arthur's Disasters
- Mechamato
- Mighty Mike
- A Monsterous Holiday
- My Knight and Me
- The Naughty List
- Piggy Tales
- Plankton Invasion
- Rimba Racer
- Stoked
- Three Delivery
- Thumb Wrestling Federation
- Trunk Train
- Under Wraps

=== Live-action ===
- Aifric
- Dead Gorgeous
- DreaMars
- The Cul De Sac
- Incredible Crew
- Snow Black
- So Awkward
- The Sparticle Mystery

=== Anime ===
- Doraemon

== Productions ==
Title	Years	Network	Notes
Total Drama	2007–2024	CBBC; Cartoon Network Canada (Canada); Cartoon Network (United States)	co-production with Fresh TV and Corus Entertainment (season 6)
Skunk Fu!	2008	BBC One/CBBC (United Kingdom); TG4/RTÉ One (Ireland); Kids' WB/Qubo (United States)	co-production with International Rheingold Productions, Cartoon Saloon and Telegael, Hoek, Line & Thinker
Angelo Rules	2010–present	France 3, France 4, TéléTOON+ & France Télévisions; Cartoon Network (United Kingdom)	co-production with TeamTO and International Rheingold Productions
Oscar's Oasis	2010–2011	Canal+ Family/Teletoon+/TF1 (France); EBS (South Korea)	co-production with TeamTO, Tuba Entertainment and Synergy Media
Poppy Cat	2011–2012	Nick Jr. UK	co-production with Coolabi Productions, King Rollo Films and Ingenious Media (season 2)
Bottersnikes & Gumbles	2015–2017	CBBC; 7TWO (Australia); Netflix	co-production with Cheeky Little Media, Kickstart Entertainment, Mighty Nice, Seven Productions, CBBC and Netflix Studios
Olobob Top	2017–2019	CBeebies; S4C (Wales)	co-production with Beakus and Cloth Cat Animation
Pablo	2017–2020	CBeebies; RTÉjr (Ireland)	co-production with Paper Owl Films, Kavaleer Productions and Ingenious Media
Total DramaRama	2018–2023	Cartoon Network (Canada/United States)	co-production with Fresh TV, Corus Entertainment and Cartoon Network; A pre-school spin-off to Total Drama
Space Chickens in Space	2018–2019	Disney XD; 9Go! (Australia)	co-production with Gingerbread Animation, Ánima Estudios, Studio Moshi and Ingenious Media
Treasure Trekkers	2019	Canal+ Family (France)	co-production with TT Productions
Mush-Mush and the Mushables	2020–2024	Boomerang UK/Tiny Pop; Piwi+/Canal+ Family/Canal+ Kids (France); La Trois/Ketnet (Belgium); RTS 1 (Switzerland); RTL Telekids (Netherlands)	co-production with Thruistar and La Cabane Produdctions
Dodo	2021–present	Sky Kids	co-production with Wildseed Studios, Telegael, Toonz Media Group and Ingenious Media
Angry Birds: Summer Madness	2022	Netflix	co-production with Rovio Entertainment, Kickstart Entertainment and Yowza! Animation
Pretty Freekin Scary	2023	Disney Channel	via CakeStart Entertainment co-production with Cloudco Entertainment, Kickstart Entertainment and Apt. 11H Productions
Supa Team 4	2023	Netflix	Previously titled as Mama K Team 4 co-production with Triggerfish Animation Studios and Superprod Studio
Armorsaurs	2025–present	Disney XD	co-production with MGA Entertainment, MGA Studios and Daewon Media

- Nikhil & Jay (CBeebies)

== Popcorn Digital ==
Founded by CAKE, Popcorn Digital is a kids' and family digital content creator. It works with leading brands including Angry Birds, Pablo, Ferly, Angelo Rules and Oscar’s Oasis. Popcorn Digital is led by youtuber and video producer Matt Lieberman. Lieberman has driven over 1M followers and 500M views for clients including Warner Bros Discovery, FOX Entertainment and Group Nine Media.
