= Télétoon+ =

téléTOON+
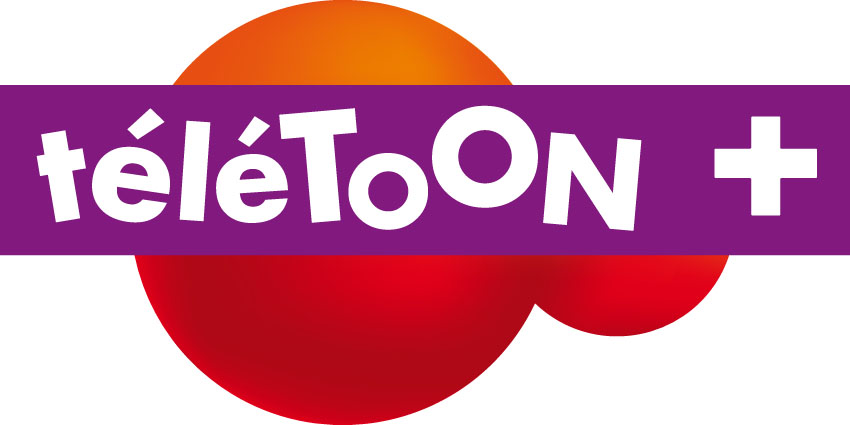
- Country: France
- Broadcast area: France, Belgium, Luxembourg, Africa, Switzerland

Programming
- Language: French
- Timeshift service: Télétoon +1

Ownership
- Owner: Canal+
- Sister channels: Canal+ Kids; Piwi+

History
- Launched: 17 December 1996; 29 years ago
- Former names: Télétoon (1996-2011)

Links
- Website: Télétoon+

Availability

Terrestrial
- Easy TV (Congo): Channel 21
- Freebox (Congo): Channel 150

Télétoon+ (formerly Télétoon, stylized téléTOON+) is a French pay television channel operated by Canal+, focusing its programming on animation (and live-action in evening) for children ages 7 to 14. It was launched on 17 December 1996.

The channel shares no relation to Télétoon, a Canadian channel owned by Corus Entertainment that launched the following year and also airs French-language animated programming.

== History ==
Télétoon was launched by TPS at its launch on 16 December 1996.

1996–1999 Télétoon logo.

Télétoon +1 was launched on 2 September 2002, importing the popular concept in UK of « replay channel ».

Télétoon joined Canalsat on 21 March 2007 when it merged with TPS.

From 2006 to 2009, an English-language version of Télétoon was distributed on MyTV in Nigeria.

In 2012, Canal+ wanted to remove Télétoon+ of ISP offers on 2 April, which was part of the obligations imposed when TPS and Canalsat merged to allow ISPs to develop their TV offers. The previous year, TPS-Canalsat merger was "cancelled" by the Autorité de la Concurrence and Canal+ was heavily fined for its dominant position without having respected its obligations, and the French Competition Authority imposed new injunctions on 23 July 2012. Meanwhile, Canal+ tried to convince the Council of State that its economic situation was difficult.

Since 1 July 2015, Télétoon+ is available in HD.

In 2017, Télétoon+ became a Canal+ exclusive. Since this year Télétoon+ started to air shows in their first run rather than most of them premiering on Canal+ Family and started airing live-action shows around this period.

== Programmes on Télétoon+ ==
Canal+ produce a lot of TV series.

- 3 Amigonauts
- Abominable and the Invisible City
- Almost Naked Animals
- Angel's Friends
- Angelo Rules
- Atomic Betty
- Action Dad
- Being Ian
- Boule et Bill
- Braceface
- Butt-Ugly Martians
- Camp Lakebottom
- Captain Biceps
- Captain Flamingo
- Copy Cut
- Cosmic Quantum Ray
- Cosy Corner
- The Crumpets
- Cyberchase
- The Daltons
- Danny Phantom
- Detentionnaire
- Trust Me, I'm a Genie
- Etucekoi
- Endangered Species
- Fairly OddParents
- FloopaLoo, Where Are You?
- Girlstuff/Boystuff
- Gnark
- Grossology
- Horseland
- Hot Wheels: Battle Force 5
- Iggy Arbuckle
- I, Elvis Riboldi
- Jacob Two-Two
- Jewelpet
- Kaeloo
- Kika and Bob
- King
- Kirarin Revolution
- Kirby: Right Back at Ya!
- Kung Foot
- Lili's Island
- Little Tornados
- Legend Quest
- Lucky Luke
- Magical Doremi
- The Magic School Bus
- Martin Morning
- The Minimighty Kids
- The Minimighty Squad
- Monster Allergy
- My Dad the Rock Star
- My Life as a Teenage Robot
- The Mysterious Cities of Gold
- Ned's Newt
- Nerds and Monsters
- Numb Chucks
- Oddbods
- Olliver's Adventures
- Oggy and The Cockroaches
- Peanuts
- Pet Alien
- Plankton Invasion
- Scary Larry
- Sgt. Frog
- Sherlock Yack
- Shugo Chara!
- Smurfs
- SpongeBob SquarePants
- Stickin' Around
- Stoked
- Swept Away
- Sweet Little Monsters
- Teenage Mutant Ninja Turtles
- Adventures of Sonic the Hedgehog
- Tokyo Mew Mew
- Total Drama Island
- Total DramaRama
- Tracey McBean
- The Sisters
- What About Mimi?
- Winx Club
- Yakari
- Zoé Kézako
