= Doraemon Land =

- Genre: Game show
- Presented by: Laura Artolachipi
- Country of origin: Spain
- Original language: Spanish
- No. of seasons: 1
- No. of episodes: 11

Production
- Executive producers: Carlos García Casado; Sophie Leclair; Francisco Gratacós; Meritxell Gratacós; Ana González; Monica Chavez; Risto Mejide; Marc Ros; Enrique Darriba; Jesus Ugarte
- Producers: 60dB; LUK Internacional; Turnek; Fujiko-Pro
- Production locations: David Botello; César Heinrich
- Running time: 30 minutes

Original release
- Network: Boing
- Release: 10 October – 19 December 2014

Doraemon Land is a Spanish game show based on the anime and manga series Doraemon. The space was produced by 60dB, Luk Internacional and Turnek. The show was broadcast on Boing channel every Friday night at 9 PM. The MC was actress Malaga Laura Artolachipi.

== History ==
In the second quarter of 2014, Spain Media attracted the player through two ways: the first was writing one's name on the Boing website, and the second was a voice test in Malaga between 30 and 31 May 2014 and in Madrid between 6 and 7 June 2014.

== Episodes ==
No.	Original release date	Rating
1	10 October 2014	3.4%
2	17 October 2014	3.0%
3	24 October 2014	3.1%
4	31 October 2014	1.7%
5	7 November 2014	2.5%
6	14 November 2014	2.2%
7	21 November 2014	2.4%
8	28 November 2014	3.0%
9	5 December 2014	1.4%
10	12 December 2014	2.5%
11	19 December 2014	2.1%

=== Contestants ===
Player	Episode 1	Episode 2	Episode 3	Episode 4	Episode 5	Episode 6	Episode 7	Episode 8	Episode 9	Episode 10	Episode 11 (G.F.)
Alesia and María	3										
Samuel and Daniel	1										Finalist
Cayetano and María	2										
Carolina and Iris		2									
Juan and Adrián		1									Finalist
Isabel and Alejandra		3									
Irene and Lidia			3								
Rubén and Eduardo			1								Finalist
Eugenia and Carmen			2								
Jaume and Lourdes				3							
María and Raquel				1							Finalist
Paula and Joaquín				2							
Claudia and Paula					3						
Yaiza and Libe					2						
Adriana and Paula					1						Finalist
Unai and Gonzalo						2					
Irene and Laura						1					Finalist
Jaime and Darío						3					
Andrea and Alejandra							2				
Rafael and Cristian							3				
Juan and Hugo							1				Finalist
Eloy and Yago								2			
Natalia and Alba								1			Won
Noah and Ana								3			
Rubén and Adrián									3		
Antonio and María									2		
Adriana and Álvaro									1		Finalist
Jorge and Nicolás										2	
Rodrigo and Gonzalo										1	Finalist
Adrián and Daniel										3	
