= Oscar's Oasis =

Animated television series

- Series's poster
- Genre: Silent comedy; Slapstick
- Created by: Tae-Sik Shin
- Directed by: Arthur Qwak; Tae-Sik Shin; Joeri Christiaen; Frédéric Martin; Fabrice Fouquet; Stéphane Mit; Yoshimichi Tamura; Geoffroy De Crécy; Lionel Allaix; Marco Allard; Dominique Debar; Olivier Derynck
- Voices of: Marie Facundo; Sly Johnson; Martial Le Minoux; Jérémy Prevost
- Composer: Le Chantier
- Countries of origin: France; South Korea; United Kingdom
- Original languages: Silent; Interjection
- No. of seasons: 1
- No. of episodes: 78 + 7 shorts + 1 pilot

Production
- Executive producers: Sung-Jai Ahn; Corinne Kouper; Eugene Kang; Tom van Waveren; Genevieve Dexter; Guillaume Hellouin
- Editor: Nazim Meslem
- Running time: 4 minutes (pilot); 1–3 minutes (shorts); 7 minutes (original)
- Production companies: TeamTO; Tuba Entertainment; Cake Entertainment; Synergy Media

Original release
- Network: Canal+ Family / Télétoon+ / TF1 (France); EBS (South Korea)
- Release: 5 September 2010 – 25 September 2011

Oscar's Oasis (known as Oscar & Co in French) is an animated comedy television series consisting of 78 7-minute episodes. It was produced by Tuba Entertainment and TeamTO, in co-production with Cake Entertainment and Synergy Media, with the participation of TF1, Canal+ Family, Télétoon+, EBS, BENEX, and Carrimages 5, and the support of National Center of Cinematography and the moving image (CNC), the Rhône-Alpes Region, the Poitou-Charentes region and Korea Creative Content Agency (KOCCA). Although the series contains no dialogue, it features the voices of Marie Facundo, Sly Johnson, Martial Le Minoux and Jérémy Prevost. The show takes heavy inspiration from the Wile E. Coyote and Road Runner shorts from the Golden age of American animation.

Originally, the series started out as a short called Oasis, which then later became a series that was called Ooohhh Asis, and was composed of seven one-minute-and-a-half episodes, which were broadcast on 26 March 2008 from TF1 and in 2009 on Nickelodeon.

Oscar's Oasis debuted in its new format at the 2010 MIPTV Media Market. The series premiered on Canal+ and Canal+ Family in September 2010, and has been broadcast on TF1 since late summer 2011. In July 2011, the series was released on the Nintendo 3DS in 3D. The show started airing on Gulli on July 2, 2019.

== Plot ==
Oscar is a lizard who lives in a non-specific desert that has features from several different real deserts, like the Sahara, Kalahari Desert, and North American deserts. An asphalt concrete highway runs through the area, used from time to time by various cargo trucks. Oscar is generally searching for food or water; he sometimes discovers liquid, in bottles or elsewhere, but is usually frustrated from recovering it for drink. An oasis supplies the only fresh water in the area, but its large population of crocodiles renders it inaccessible. At considerable personal risk (lizard is a delicacy for chickens), Oscar occasionally manages to steal an egg from a nearby hen coop, and he sometimes explores one of the piles of trash that litter the parched landscape. The Trio, which consists of a vulture named Buck, a hyena named Harchi, and a fennec fox named Popy, inhabit an abandoned school bus situated on a neighboring hill, but they mostly race about on a cast-off bed or grocery cart driven by Harchi and directed by Popy. Like Oscar, the Trio constantly searches for food and water - often competing with him, and sometimes abusing him as a means, but occasionally cooperating with him when it suits their purpose. The characters often find themselves falling off cliffs similar to Wile E. Coyote and the Road Runner, wherein the law of gravity is briefly suspended while the character comes to realize their imminent doom.

== Characters ==
=== Main ===
The four primary characters are:

- Oscar (voiced by Marie Facundo) - a lizard and the main character of the show who often gets into trouble with Buck, Harchi, Popy, and even the chickens. He often tries to catch flies and find some water, but most of the time, it backfires on him. Whenever Oscar has something interesting, the Trio always tries to take it from him, while he in turn often tries to steal their food. In Oasis and Ooohhh Asis, he had no name.
- Popy (voiced by Marie Facundo) - a fennec fox and the leader of the Trio, who strategizes and gives directions. She is clever and sneaky, tricking the other animals as well as the two others in the trio. As shown in the episodes "Pronto Express", "Forbidden Paradise", and "Bad Seed", she is also greedy. In Oasis and Ooohhh Asis, she was originally male and called Panic.
- Harchi (voiced by Sly Johnson) - a hyena and the brawn of the Trio, who is unintelligent and given the physical jobs. He normally acts as the driving force behind the makeshift cart that he and his friends use to chase Oscar or the chickens. In the event of them taking a collective tumble, Harchi typically catches everyone so that they avoid the ravine. In Oasis and Ooohhh Asis he is the only character to have his name consistent.
- Buck (voiced by Sly Johnson) - a vulture and the brains of the Trio, who tolerates when Harchi gets chastised by Popy. In Oasis and Ooohhh Asis, he was originally called Burk.

=== Reccurrent ===
- Manolo (voiced by Martial Le Minoux) - a truck driver who transports various items in the series. He is always asleep at the wheel while his dog, Roco, drives.
- Roco - (voiced by Marc du Pontavice) - Manolo's loyal and faithful dog. He always tries to keep their cargo safe and frequently chases Oscar and the trio or tries to deter them from the contents of the truck. He is generally more friendly with Oscar than with the trio.
- Lizardette (voiced by Carla Hijii) - a female lizard to whom Oscar's heart belongs, though they sometimes compete with each other over things. In the episode "Corn to Be Wild", she has babies, but it is unknown who her mate is.
- The Chickens (voiced by Paul Ihara) - their half-closed eyes give them a nonchalant, blasé appearance. They fall blindly into the traps laid for them, and get out of them without realizing they have escaped any kind of danger. They always try to eat Oscar.
- The Crocodiles (voiced by Samuel J. Adkins) - the most feared animals of the desert and the top predators.
- The Skunk (voiced by Michael Na-Ra) - He doesn't smell good. He uses his smell to terrorize the other denizens of the desert, however Oscar is unaffected by his smell and often unwittingly scares him off instead. He often takes the trio's fruit.
- The Meerkats (voiced by Christopher Stiller) - The "thieves" of the desert who sometimes steal stuff from the trio as they compete with Oscar. In some episodes, however, they work together with Oscar against the trio.
- The Dung Beetles (voiced by Richard Mori) - Oscar's friends who occasionally help him out of tough predicaments. In the episode "Revenge of the Small Fry", Oscar once helped them roll up a large ball of dung, which they have never forgotten.
- Junior (voiced by Will Villar) - Oscar's adopted son who made only one appearance in the show.
- The Fly (voiced by Michelle Cole) - Oscar's prey which he sometimes eats, but is quick and is not always eaten by him.

== Episodes ==
Each episode runs for 7 minutes. There is one episode in Oasis, 7 episodes in Ooohhh Asis, and 78 episodes in Oscar's Oasis, which is 86 episodes total.

Season	Episodes	Originally released	
Season	Episodes	First released	Last released
Pilot		2004	
Ooohhh Asis	7	February 17, 2007	2007
Oscar's Oasis	78	September 5, 2010	September 25, 2011

=== Oasis (2004) ===
1. "Oasis": The Lizard, the Trio and Burk’s children, Boogi and Woogi, search for an oasis in the desert, but to no avail and they all end up falling off a cliff, not knowing that farther from the cliff, is an oasis.

=== Ooohhh Asis (2007) ===
1. "Panic Attack": The Trio try to catch a chicken by riding on a tire that The Lizard gets stuck on & is then caught by the chicken, but after a wild ride, the Trio land on a precipice that topples to the ground when the tire hits it and they fall to their doom along with the Lizard.
2. "Happy Harchi": The Trio try to catch a chicken by riding on a pogo stick, which the Lizard gets stuck on, but they land onto a precipice and they topple into a tar pit when the Lizard tries to let go and causes the Trio to slam into the precipice, and they have a close encounter with a rattlesnake that the Lizard awoke while trying to catch a fly.
3. "Cool Wing Burk": While the Trio are trying to catch a chicken by riding on a mower, the Lizard gets caught by a female vulture whom Burk falls in love with, which causes problems for the Trio since he is driving, and when he offers her the chicken, she drops Oscar, causing the mower to turn on and the Trio to fall off a cliff and the female to fall in love with the chicken.
4. "Canyon Crossing": While catching the chicken with a shopping cart, the chicken changes positions, causing them to have to try many ways to cross a canyon, but they keep falling off a cliff.
5. "Don't Count Your Chickens": The Trio finds a truck loaded with chickens, and they try to chase it on a bed with wheels, but the chickens start chasing and attacking them upon seeing the Lizard stuck onboard, causing them to crash into a sign that falls down with them while the Lizard keeps getting chased.
6. "Chicken Chasseur": Panic disguises himself as a chicken, but after a chase on a boat, a mix-up in positions ends up with Panic getting cooked. They continue the chase and they dispose of the suit, which falls on the Lizard.
7. "A Bird in the Paw": The Trio tries to catch a bigger chicken with bumper cars that the Lizard gets stuck on, but then the tables turn when the bigger chicken starts trying to eat and chase them instead of running.

=== Oscar's Oasis (2010–11) ===
1. "Bad Trip" (September 5, 2010): A thirsty Oscar and the Trio fight over a bottle of water to revive themselves.
2. "Egg Race": Oscar tries to steal eggs from the chickens that the Trio wants to eat.
3. "Finding Water": (First appearance of Manolo and Roco) Oscar and the Trio fight over Roco's water finding sticks, then later fight over a water bottle that Oscar gets his head stuck in.
4. "Baby Doll": Oscar makes friends with a baby doll that the Trio are using for their target practice game.
5. "Falling in Love": (First appearance of Lizardette) Oscar falls in love with a green female lizard named Lizardette, who is then caught by a chicken, which in turn is captured by the Trio, so Oscar goes to rescue her while the chickens rescue their comrade.
6. "The Fly": (First appearance of the fly) Oscar tries relentlessly to catch a fly while the Trio try to steal a load of apples from Roco's truck.
7. "Hot Dog Way of Life": Oscar and the Trio try to steal a vending machine from Roco's truck.
8. "Walking on the Moon": (First appearance of the meerkats) Oscar takes a wild ride on a replica of the moon while the Trio pursues a chicken.
9. "Chicken Charmer": Oscar use a trumpet to put the chickens under his control and enslaves them into making eggs and also uses them as an army to protect his egg cache from the Trio.
10. "Oasis Cup": Popy and Harchi compete in a game of tennis with Buck as the scorekeeper and Harchi continuously winning to Popy, and it worsens when Oscar mistakes the ball for an egg.
11. "Home Sweet Home": Oscar wants a place to rest for the night, so he takes up the home-making business, but the Trio, who now live right by him in an abandoned bus and are currently having a housewarming party, inadvertently ruin his chances.
12. "Road Runners": Oscar tries to catch a fly while the Trio tries to chase a chicken.
13. "Top Gun": Oscar mistakes a missing page from the Trio's storybook with a glass of water for a real one, making it hard for the Trio to retrieve the missing page to finish the story.
14. "Beach Dream": Oscar tries to relax in an oasis in the desert, but the Trio also find it too and inadvertently ruin his attempts.
15. "Blueberry": Oscar tries to climb a cliff to get to a blueberry bush while the Trio try to reach the water bowl in Roco's chicken pen. However, they all keep on ruining each other's attempts at the worst possible time.
16. "Meerkat Blues": A group of meerkats steel the Trio's soda cans for their party & Oscar takes the advantage to steal from them which causes the Trio to believe Oscar is responsible & chase him, until they realize the meerkat's folly & join him.
17. "Parasol, Parabole and Satellite Dish": Oscar uses an umbrella in the chicken pen to get shade, but the Trio want to use it as a satellite dish to watch on an old TV with bad signal.
18. "Barbecue Party": A thirsty Oscar finds a water bottle that the Trio are using to light their barbecue grill.
19. "Pronto Express": Oscar discovers the joys of food delivery when he steals a phone from the Trio's home, where Popy is not willing to share the food with her friends.
20. "Junior": An egg falls off a truck bound for the zoo and into the hands of Oscar. It then hatches into a baby lizard and Oscar decides to care for him while trying to protect and teach him everything about the facts of life. Later, he then suddenly grows into a giant while raiding the chicken pen and protects Oscar from the Trio who want to eradicate them both.
21. "Strike!": Oscar tries to extract coconut water from Roco's coconut that the Trio are using for a game of bowling that Harchi keeps winning.
22. "Cuckoo Horn": Oscar finds a cuckoo clock and becomes fascinated with the baby rubber duck that comes out, but the Trio steal as a horn in order to give Roco a taste of his own medicine after they are annoyed by Roco's horn.
23. "Fly Force One": When Oscar eats one too many flies, they (who are still alive) suddenly make Oscar forever airborne which he uses as an advantage against the Trio.
24. "The Great Escape": Oscar is captured by the Trio and is enslaved as a pet. After days of enslavement, he decides to break free, but the Trio are alerted and try to reclaim him.
25. "Rock a Bye Booboo": Oscar gets ahold of a music box that, when activated, plays an alluring melody that puts whoever is listening to sleep, that he and the Trio both fight over and take advantage of.
26. "Fluff the Magic Lizard": When Oscar is covered in chicken feathers, the other chickens and the Trio mistake him for a real chick, & the chickens treat him as one of their own, Popy and Buck try to eat him, while Harchi's heart is touched by him, and he decides to keep him, much to his friends’ dismay.
27. "Lost": During a chase, Oscar and Harchi get lost and Oscar tries to get him home while Popy and Buck believe they are dead.
28. "Forbidden Zone": (First appearance of the Skunk) Oscar and the Trio meet a skunk that has a super deadly odor that repels the Trio, but does not work on Oscar since he has a lack of smell and tries to repay the skunk while the Trio chase him.
29. "Chicken Ace": While being chased by the Trio, a chicken gets tied up to a fan and an electric box that Oscar is using to stay cool, which causes the fan to accidentally go at his maximum speed and makes the chicken (and Oscar, who is onboard) fly.
30. "Lizard: Wanted": The Trio use a camera to put up wanted posters for Oscar when he steals their food, and trick Roco into capturing him for a reward, but after he captures him, he realizes the folly and in turn puts wanted posters for the Trio to the crocs.
31. "Yummi Oscar": Oscar obtains a box of gummy snacks that Harchi had hid, which however melt into sludge that Oscar falls into and becomes covered with, causing the Trio to think he is also a gummy snack, so they try to eat him.
32. "Mom in Spit of Himself": After a successful attempt to steal chicken eggs, Oscar inadvertently becomes the newly hatched chick's caretaker, which he now must defend from every danger, including the Trio.
33. "Corn to Be Wild": Oscar tries to obtain an ear of corn that Lizardette also wants to feed her own children, but the Trio steal it for their vegetable soup, forcing them to work together.
34. "Amazing Chicken": A chicken eats some nuclear waste that turns it into gigantic green chicken, causing Oscar, the Trio and Roco to run for their lives, but the effects turn out to be only temporary, and the chicken turns back to normal, but not without laying a giant egg that hatches a giant green chick.
35. "Power of Love": Oscar tries to steal some flowers from the Trio to give to Lizardette so he can woo her, but the successful effort turns out to be in vain after Lizardette unexpectedly eats it.
36. "Seventh Heaven": Oscar and the Trio go on a balloon chase across the desert in the escalating efforts of battle over the Trio's cache of cans full of ears of corn, resulting in a dogfight.
37. "Pineapple Chase": Oscar, the Trio, the meerkats, and the skunk all fight over a can of pineapples that fell off a truck, until they come across the crocodiles and the can falls back into the truck as they run for their lives.
38. "Sweet Smell of Success": Oscar uses sweet-smelling perfume to woo Lizardette, but it does not go well as Oscar keeps ending up in something smelly and the Trio wants to use it to attract the chickens.
39. "Food Chain": Oscar finds an egg in a nest that hatches out a baby vulture, who Buck tries to raise and prevents Popy and Harchi from trying to eat it, while Oscar tries to crack open a walnut. Eventually, the Trio return the chick to its mother.
40. "Barrel Story": Oscar and the Trio fight over a barrel of water that does not seem to open, and it gets worse when a mix-up happens when the chase comes across a truck full of barrels, resulting in Oscar claiming a barrel of gasoline.
41. "Egg Over Easy": A vulture egg falls from its nest into Oscar's hands, and the baby, active inside the egg, sends Oscar on a wild ride and it gets worse when the Trio decide to eat it. Eventually, the mother vulture retrieves the egg and Oscar, and at the nest, the egg eventually hatches & Oscar decides to take advantage of his current situation.
42. "Forbidden Paradise": Popy will not let Buck, Harchi, and Oscar take her can of corn juice, so when it ends up in Roco's chicken pen, Oscar and the Trio try to claim it all without alerting Roco.
43. "Scam Sandwich": While hiding from some pesky flies, Oscar unexpectedly teams up with the Trio to steal Roco's sandwich. It ends up with Oscar getting stuck in the sandwich while the Trio claim it for themselves, but while squabbling over their shares, Roco surprise attacks them, leaving Oscar with the sandwich.
44. "Get Out of It": Oscar and the Trio fight over a fallen crate that they think is full of food, with the Trio getting the claim and Oscar getting thrown out. However, the crate turns out to be full of baby lizards while Oscar gets the real crate that is full of apples.
45. "Winning Ticket": The Trio receive a lottery ticket, but it gets blown away by the wind and into the hands of Oscar, who only sees it as a way to get shade. After a fight, the lottery ticket is ripped apart by Roco's car engine, ruining the Trio's dreams, but finally giving Oscar the shade he needs.
46. "Collector Mania": Popy is putting together a collection of rubber duckies from popcorn boxes, but when Oscar accidentally gets his hands on the last one before the Trio and then loses it to the chickens, who think it is one of their own, he is assigned by Popy to get it back.
47. "Lucked Out": Roco's lucky horseshoe accidentally falls into Oscar's mouth, giving him good luck all the time. The Trio learns of this and try to use him to steal food from Roco, who sets out to reclaim his lucky charm.
48. "Firefly Flash": Oscar uses some fireflies he caught in a glass bottle to use them to attract flies, but the Trio steal the firefly-filled bottle to use as a lantern while trying to get chickens from Roco, prompting Oscar to save his new firefly friends.
49. "Godlizard Returns": A misunderstanding involving dung beetles rolling out alien signs and Oscar getting his head stuck in a fishbowl cause the Trio to think that Oscar is an alien. When they realize the folly, a real UFO unexpectedly appears and shrinks the Trio down to insect size as well as giving them different skin colors, making them afraid of a "giant" Oscar.
50. "My Bodyguard": Inspired by comic books about superheroes, Roco dons a Superman costume to help people in need, but then begins to think second thoughts when he is hired by Oscar as his bodyguard.
51. "Touching Bottom": Oscar tries to steal bananas from the Trio and manages to get them stuck in a deep chasm, but then has to defend them from the meerkats. After the Trio escape and swindle Oscar for protecting the bananas, he then teams up with the meerkats to teach them a lesson, eventually getting them stuck in the chasm again, and they rig it with peels.
52. "Sound Bites": Oscar finds and uses an animal-noise making machine with wheels, that has different reactions for every animal that hears it, but when the Trio realize the folly, they use it to their advantage, until playing a sheep sound to mock Oscar summons the crocodiles, who proceed to chase them and trample the machine. Oscar then uses the moment to steal the Trio's food.
53. "Black Run": Oscar goes up a hill to retrieve an egg while the trio go sand dune surfing. When the egg ends up at the bottom of the hill, the Trio challenge Oscar to a race down the hill on sleds and sand surfboards make from junk. Oscar wins, but he accidentally smashes the egg in a victory dance.
54. "One for All": The skunk tries to steal food from the Trio while they are playing poker, but is unable to due to Oscar interfering and the Trio's own countermeasures. In the end, Oscar steals a watermelon and shares it with the skunk, taking a liking to him.
55. "Frost Bitten": Oscar and the Trio compete for a block of ice in the back of Roco's truck. Their fighting results in the truck veering off a cliff and destroying the ice block.
56. "Day of the Chicken": Oscar and the Trio team up to fend off against an army of chickens, which are led by a chick who believes Oscar to be his mother after another egg attempt. Oscar and Harchi form a close bond, resulting in Oscar having to sacrifice himself to save Harchi and the others by agreeing to come with the chick and its army.
57. "The Unexpected Hero": In order to impress Lizardette, Oscar becomes a hero by using a stolen kite from the Trio and prevents harm from coming towards a little baby meerkat. However, his plan backfires when the meerkats also revere him.
58. "Busy Day": A failed attempt to get chickens involving Buck in a disguise, ends up with the latter getting amnesia after he and the rest of the Trio fall off a cliff, causing him to believe he is a chicken, forcing Popy and Harchi to snap him out of it. Meanwhile, Oscar helps protect Lizardette's egg, but when it is lost to Buck, who believes it to be his egg, both of the other's situations collide.
59. "Lizard in the Sky": Seeing how Lizardette likes fireworks, Oscar decides to steal fireworks from Popy's surprise birthday party which Harchi and Buck try hard to keep a secret from her, but it gets hard when Oscar's plans interfere.
60. "Hiccup and Away": Oscar eats a chicken egg too fast, causing him to get uncontrollable hiccups that start out as a nuisance, but Oscar discovers that if he holds his breath, his hiccups can eject him sky high, and uses this advantage to steal the Trio's food.
61. "Bad Seed": Popy doesn't want to share her food with Harchi and Buck, so she pretends to be sick so that she can sneakily eat up all the strawberries, but it backfires, when Oscar, also hungry, get in her way, and to add insult to injury, Harchi and Buck try various and bizarre methods of "curing" her.
62. "Smells Like Trouble": Oscar is having a hard time trying to steal food from the Trio, so he observes that the skunk uses his bad smell to deter others, so Oscar "borrows" some of the skunk's smell, and uses it to his advantage, but soon learns there are also negative sides of having a bad smell.
63. "Leader of the Pack": The meerkat clan's attempts to steal from the Trio fail, so Oscar decides to step in by gaining control of them by impressing them, and they proceed to get the upper hand on their enemies.
64. "Momma Croc": In order to steal food from the Trio so he can impress Lizardette, Oscar allows a female crocodile to mistake him for a newly hatched baby crocodile, and uses her to accomplish his goals, but it backfires when the crocodile gets too strict and overprotective of her "son".
65. "Toothbrush Tussel": After eating foul-smelling food, Harchi gets a powerful bad breath, so Popy and Buck try many ways to fix it, including brushing his teeth, but the other toothbrush could not bear Harchi's breath, and Oscar needs something to desperately get rid of an itch on his back.
66. "Radio Active": Roco learns that he can use his radio to make his sleepy owner Manolo move to his will, and uses this against Oscar and the Trio when the former tries to steal from him, while the latter decides to get rid of the radio to regain the upper hand on Roco.
67. "Sweet Heart": Oscar is in love with Lizardette, but she only has eyes for Harchi, so Oscar decides to be a hero so Lizardette can love him more than Harchi. This episode features reused clips from previous episodes, mainly the ones with Lizardette.
68. "Golf Club": The Trio are playing golf, with Harchi once again always winning against Popy, but the competition starts to get rougher and tougher when Oscar mistakes their golf ball for an egg.
69. "A Manolo's Best Friend": The Trio finally manage to steal from Roco's truck, and eject him from it to take control, causing Roco to get separated from Manolo in the process, so Oscar helps him reunite with his owner and take revenge against the Trio.
70. "Revenge of the Small Fry": Oscar wants to steal a banana that is heavily guarded by the Trio, so by enlisting the help of the dung beetle colony by helping them, they besiege their home to retrieve the food.
71. "He's Got Rhythm": Oscar accidentally eats the Trio's radio during a raid on their front door, and learns that by using his tail to change channels, he can put different effects on the other animals and uses it to his advantage, while the Trio search for their radio.
72. "Roco's Treasure": Oscar and the Trio see Roco hiding something and dig it out, revealing a treasure map, which delights them and they race to claim the treasure first, while Roco tracks them down to retrieve his map and treasure.
73. "Follyball": In order to impress Lizardette, Oscar is forced to participate in the Trio's volleyball match so Buck can have a partner, with Oscar and Buck playing two on two with Popy and Harchi.
74. "Down in the Dumps": Oscar and the Trio's fun in the junk dumps is interrupted by Roco, whom starts throwing all the dump in his truck after he get hurt while chasing them, causing them to have to team up to retrieve back their stolen junk.
75. "Witness the Fitness": Harchi has become so fat from eating too much that he and the Trio cannot keep up with Roco when they try stealing from him, so Popy and Buck put him into a fitness crash course, with Oscar, who is having a hard time getting chicken eggs, swindled into helping by delicious hot dogs. It works, but the crash course unintentionally helps benefit Oscar, and uses his new fitness to seek revenge.
76. "Hunt for Red Hot Chili Pepper": A thirsty Oscar finds a jar of red hot chili peppers that cause him to breathe fire and get ejected sky high, which causes accidents to happen to the residents of the desert and cause Oscar to become a victim.
77. "For a Fistful of Corn": Oscar and the Trio keep attempting to steal Roco's cargo of corn after Roco gets ejected out while guarding, but they fail every time while Roco tries to get back to his truck.
78. "Picture Perfect" (September 25, 2011): (Inspired by the earlier episode "Lizard: Wanted") In the final episode, Oscar finds a camera that takes a picture of him, and Oscar believes the photo is another lizard, so when the Trio steal it from him, Oscar tries to get it back.
