= TeamTO =

French animated motion picture studio

- Logo used since 2026
- Type: Private
- Industry: Animation
- Founded: 2005; 21 years ago
- Headquarters: 20 Rue de la Pierre Levée, 75011, Paris, FR, Paris, France
- Number of locations: Bourg-lès-Valence, France (2015); Los Angeles, California, U.S. (2011); Beijing, China (2016)
- Area served: International
- Key people: Marco Balsamo (President and CEO) Tara Sibel (COO and Deputy CEO)
- Services: Animations Services; Animation Production; Animation Software Technology
- Parent: RIVA Studios (2024–present)
- Subsidiaries: TeamTO USA; TeamTOKO Citrus Software
- Website: teamto.com

TeamTO (pronounced “team-toe”) (Note: TeamTO officially stylizes its name with a capitalized “TO”. According to the company, the “TO” is derived from the Japanese word tobiuo (飛魚), meaning “flying fish,” which inspired the studio’s 2026 corporate rebranding and logo.) is a French animation studio headquartered in Paris and Valence, France. The company develops, finances, produces, and provides animation services for animated television series and feature films. Since December 2024, TeamTO has operated as a subsidiary of RIVA Studios, an independent Italian-American production studio founded by Marco Balsamo and Tara Sibel.

Founded in 2005, TeamTO became one of France's leading independent animation studios. The company is known for producing and contributing to internationally distributed animated series including Angelo Rules, Rabbids Invasion, PJ Masks, Mighty Mike, The Creature Cases, Jade Armor, and Kiya & the Kimoja Heroes. Throughout its history, TeamTO has collaborated with broadcasters, streaming platforms, and production companies including Disney Television Animation, DreamWorks Animation Television, Netflix Animation, Sony Pictures Television Kids, France Télévisions, Ubisoft Film & Television, and The Tetris Company.

Following judicial restructuring proceedings in 2024, TeamTO was acquired by RIVA Studios. Since February 2025, the company has been led by President and chief executive officer Marco Balsamo. Under its new ownership, TeamTO has expanded beyond its traditional focus on computer-generated children's animation through investments in original intellectual property, 2D animation, anime-inspired productions, proprietary production technology, and productions for teen and adult audiences, while continuing to provide animation production services for third-party clients.

== History ==
=== Founding and Growth (2005-2024) ===
TeamTO was founded in 2005 by Guillaume Hellouin, Corinne Kouper, and Caroline Souris as an independent French animation studio specializing in computer-generated animation. The company established its headquarters in Paris and later expanded its production operations to Valence, where it developed one of Europe's largest computer-generated animation production facilities. During its expansion, TeamTO also established international offices in Los Angeles, London, and Beijing to support business development, international co-productions, and client relations.

During the late 2000s and 2010s, TeamTO established itself as both an original content producer and a provider of animation services for international productions. The company produced or co-produced animated series including Angelo Rules, Hareport, Oscar’s Oasis, Plankton Invasion, Rabbids Invasion, Mighty Mike, Jade Armor, The Creature Cases, and Kiya & the Kimoja Heroes.

Alongside its original productions, TeamTO provided animation services for numerous international series, including Sofia the First and Elena of Avalor for Disney Television Animation, Skylanders Academy for Activision Blizzard Studios, City of Ghosts for Netflix Animation, and Dew Drop Diaries for DreamWorks Animation Television.

Over the following two decades, TeamTO became known for its computer-generated television animation and collaborated with broadcasters, distributors, streaming platforms, and production companies throughout Europe, North America, and Asia.

=== Judicial restructuring and acquisition (2024) ===
In October 2024, TeamTO entered judicial restructuring (redressement judiciaire) proceedings following financial difficulties affecting both the company and the wider animation industry. The proceedings were initiated by the Paris Commercial Court to allow the company to restructure while maintaining its operations.

During the restructuring process, RIVA Studios entered negotiations to acquire TeamTO's assets and business operations. On 5 December 2024, the French Commercial Court approved the acquisition, transferring ownership of the company to RIVA Studios.

The acquisition enabled TeamTO to continue its operations, preserve its production pipeline, maintain relationships with existing clients and partners, and retain a significant portion of its workforce under new ownership.

=== New Ownership (2025 - Present) ===
In February 2025, Marco Balsamo was appointed president and chief executive officer of TeamTO with Tara Sibel serving as Chief Operating Officer and Deputy Chief Executive Officer.

Following the acquisition, the company broadened its strategic focus beyond computer-generated children's programming by investing in original intellectual property, 2D animation, productions aimed at teen and adult audiences, and proprietary production technologies while continuing to provide animation production services.

In 2026, TeamTO launched TeamTOKO, a production division dedicated to anime-inspired television series and feature films. The division was established to develop creator-driven projects influenced by Japanese animation while combining European production practices and international co-production models. Its initial development slate included the television series Shadow Soccer and the feature film Akira’s Flying Wheelchair. Further, the division announced the planned development of their first original animated series, named Junichiro Jackson (JJ), with a proof of concept that released on YouTube on July 22, 2026. JJ will be developed in collaboration with the studio Martian Blueberry.

During the 2026 edition of the Annecy International Animation Film Festival, TeamTO announced several new strategic initiatives, including the launch of TeamTO Creator Lab, an incubator program supporting professional animation creators in the development of original intellectual property, and expanded investment in proprietary production software and animation technology. At its launch, TeamTO announced animator and creator Havtza as the inaugural recipient of the TeamTO Creator Lab, becoming the first creator selected to participate in the initiative.

At the same festival, the studio announced Tetris: World Builders, an animated television series developed in partnership with The Tetris Company. The announcement featured an on-stage appearance by Maya Rogers, chief executive officer of The Tetris Company, during TeamTO's Studio Focus presentation.

== Organization ==
Following its acquisition by RIVA Studios, TeamTO reorganized its operations into three principal business divisions focused on animation production, intellectual property management, and production technology.

=== TeamTO Animation ===
TeamTO Animation is responsible for the development, financing, production, and delivery of animated television series, feature films, and short-form productions. The division develops original intellectual property, manages international co-productions, and provides animation production services for third-party studios, broadcasters, and streaming platforms.

=== TeamTO Films ===
TeamTO Films oversees the company's intellectual property portfolio and content catalogue. Its responsibilities include project financing, commercial strategy, distribution support, licensing, and the long-term management and commercial exploitation of the studio's film and television library.

=== TeamTO Technology ===
TeamTO Technology is responsible for the research and development of proprietary animation technologies, production software, and pipeline tools used throughout the studio's productions. The division works closely with Citrus Software, a technology company established by RIVA Studios to develop and commercialize TeamTO's proprietary production technologies for the broader animation industry.

=== TeamTOKO ===
TeamTOKO is TeamTO's anime-inspired production division, launched in 2026. The label develops original animated television series and feature films influenced by Japanese animation while combining European production practices with international co-production models.

TeamTOKO was established as part of TeamTO's broader strategy to expand beyond its traditional focus on computer-generated children's programming into productions for teen, young adult, and adult audiences. The label develops creator-driven projects across a range of genres, including action, fantasy, science fiction, sports, and coming-of-age stories.

The label's initial development slate included the animated feature film Akira’s Flying Wheelchair and the television series Shadow Soccer, an anime-inspired sports drama presented at Cartoon Forum in Toulouse in September 2025.

=== TeamTO Creator Lab ===
TeamTO Creator Lab is an animation development initiative established by TeamTO in 2026 to support professional creators in the development of original animated intellectual property.

The program provides writers, directors, artists, and producers with development support, creative mentorship, production resources, and access to TeamTO's financing, packaging, and international co-production expertise during the early stages of project development. Its objective is to accelerate the development of original animated television series and feature films while fostering long-term creative partnerships with established and emerging talent.

The program was announced during the 2026 edition of the Annecy International Animation Film Festival. At its launch, TeamTO announced animator and creator Havtza as the inaugural recipient of the TeamTO Creator Lab, becoming the first creator selected to participate in the initiative.

Projects developed through TeamTO Creator Lab may receive continued support through TeamTO's development, production, financing, and international distribution pipeline.

=== Citrus Software ===
Citrus Software is a French software company established by RIVA Studios in 2025 to develop, maintain, and commercialize TeamTO's proprietary animation software.

The company was created to bring TeamTO's internally developed production technologies to the wider animation industry while continuing to support the studio's own productions. Its software portfolio includes Tangerine, Yuzu, and Mikan, all of which originated from TeamTO's in-house research and development efforts.

==== Tangerine ====
Tangerine is a real-time animation platform developed by Citrus Software. Originally created for TeamTO's internal productions, the software enables artists to animate collaboratively in real time while providing immediate visual feedback throughout production. It supports both 3D and hybrid 2.5D animation workflows and is designed to accelerate creative iteration and production efficiency.

==== Yuzu ====
Yuzu is a production management platform developed by Citrus Software for animation studios. Designed specifically for animation pipelines, it provides project planning, production scheduling, asset management, workflow automation, analytics, and collaboration across creative, technical, and production departments.

==== Mikan ====
Mikan is a free and open-source rigging toolkit developed by Citrus Software. Originally created for TeamTO's internal productions, the software was released publicly to support character rigging workflows across the animation industry. Mikan integrates with both Tangerine and third-party animation software as part of Citrus Software's broader production technology ecosystem.

== Productions ==
Note: (Note: Unless otherwise indicated, production credits listed in the filmography reflect TeamTO’s principal role on each production (e.g., original production, co-production, production, or animation services) and may not represent every participating studio or production entity.)

Since its founding in 2005, TeamTO has developed, financed, produced, co-produced, and provided animation services for animated television series, feature films, and short films. (Note: Dates shown in the filmography refer to the original release period of each production rather than the duration of TeamTO’s involvement where those differ.) The studio has worked across original productions, international co-productions, and service work for broadcasters, streaming platforms, and production companies worldwide.

TeamTO is best known for original productions including Angelo Rules, Hareport, Plankton Invasion, Mighty Mike, Jade Armor, The Creature Cases, and Kiya & the Kimoja Heroes. The studio has also co-produced internationally distributed series such as Rabbids Invasion, PJ Masks, Oscar’s Oasis, Babar and the Adventures of Badou, and Ricky Zoom.

In addition to its original productions, TeamTO has provided animation services for productions including Sofia the First, Elena of Avalor, Skylanders Academy, City of Ghosts, and Dew Drop Diaries, collaborating with studios including Disney Television Animation, DreamWorks Animation Television, Netflix Animation, Sony Pictures Television Kids, Activision Blizzard Studios, Entertainment One, France Télévisions, and Ubisoft Film & Television.

Following its acquisition by RIVA Studios, TeamTO expanded its original development slate to include productions for preschool, children, teen, and adult audiences. Projects announced under the new ownership include Tetris: World Builders, Junichiro Jackson, and Akira's Flying Wheelchair. (Note: Productions listed as In development have been publicly announced by TeamTO or its production partners but have not yet entered general release.)

=== Television series ===
Years	Title	Role	Production partners / Client
2007–08	Zoé Kézako	Co-production	Télé Images Kids; M6
2010	Hareport	Original production	Vivi Film
2010–15	Babar and the Adventures of Badou	Co-production	Guru Studio; Pipeline Studios; LuxAnimation
2010–present	Angelo Rules	Original production	CAKE Entertainment; International Rheingold Productions
2010–11	Oscar's Oasis	Co-production	Tuba Entertainment; CAKE Entertainment; Synergy Media
2011–12	Plankton Invasion	Original production	Vivi Film; Tinkertree
2013–17	Rabbids Invasion	Co-production	Ubisoft Film & Television; Anima; France Télévisions
2015–19	PJ Masks	Co-production / Animation services	Frog Box; Entertainment One
2016–17	My Knight and Me	Original production	Thuristar
2019–21	Mighty Mike	Original production	CAKE Entertainment
2019–22	Ricky Zoom	Co-production	Entertainment One
2021	City of Ghosts	Production	Netflix Animation Studios
2021–present	Presto! School of Magic	Co-production	Federation Kids & Family
2022–present	The Creature Cases	Production	Sony Pictures Television Kids
2022–present	Jade Armor	Original production	France Télévisions; Super RTL
2023–24	Kiya & the Kimoja Heroes	Co-production	Entertainment One; Triggerfish Animation Studios; Frog Box Productions; Disney Branded Television
In development	What’s Up Eesha?	Original production	France Télévisions; Dandelooo
In development	Tetris: World Builders	Original production	The Tetris Company

=== Feature Films ===
Year	Title	Role	Production partners
2014	Yellowbird	Co-production	On Entertainment; Futurikon
In development	Akira’s Flying Wheelchair	Original production	—

=== Animated shorts ===
Year	Title	Role
2008	Le Dilemme du beurre	Original production
2017	Welcome to My Life	Animation services

=== Animation services ===
Years	Title	Client
2011	La Minute du Chat	Salut ça va ?
2013–15	Pac-Man and the Ghostly Adventures	41 Entertainment; Arad Productions; Bandai Namco Entertainment; OLM Digital
2013–14	Calimero	Gaumont Animation; Studio Campedelli
2015–18	Sofia the First	Disney Television Animation
2016–18	Skylanders Academy	Activision Blizzard Studios
2016–18	Elena of Avalor	Disney Television Animation
2023	Dew Drop Diaries	DreamWorks Animation Television

=== Awards and nominations ===
Year	Production	Award	Category	Result
2012	Plankton Invasion	Cartoons on the Bay – Pulcinella Awards	TV Series for Kids	Nominated
2013	Angelo Rules	International Emmy Kids Awards	Kids: Animation	Nominated
2015	TeamTO	Cartoon Movie	European Producer of the Year	Won
2022	Jade Armor	International Emmy Kids Awards	Kids: Animation	Nominated
2023	The Creature Cases	Annie Awards	Best TV/Media – Preschool	Nominated
2026	The Creature Cases	Children's and Family Emmy Awards	Outstanding Editing for a Preschool Animated Program	Nominated

== Logo ==
In 2026, the company introduced a redesigned visual identity featuring a flying fish. According to TeamTO, the “TO” in the company's name is derived from the Japanese word tobiuo (飛魚), meaning “flying fish.” The redesigned logo accompanied a broader corporate rebranding following the studio's acquisition by RIVA Studios and reflects the company's expanded focus on original intellectual property, anime-inspired productions, and proprietary animation technology.
