= My Knight and Me =

Animated television series

- Genre: CGI animation Fantasy; Comedy
- Created by: Joeri Christiaen
- Directed by: Joeri Christiaen
- Voices of: Jules de Jongh; Kaycie Chase; David Gasman
- Composers: Frederik Segers; Jan Duthoy
- Countries of origin: France; Belgium
- Original language: English
- No. of seasons: 1
- No. of episodes: 52

Production
- Producers: Corrine Kouper; Perrine Gauthier
- Running time: 11 minutes
- Production companies: TeamTO; Thuristar

Original release
- Network: OUFtivi (Wallonia); Télétoon+ (France); Canal+ Family (France)
- Release: August 28, 2016 – June 29, 2017

My Knight and Me (French: Mon Chevalier et Moi) is an animated fantasy television series created by Joeri Christiaen. The series is a co-production between TeamTO and Thuristar, in co-production with Canal+ Family, Télétoon+, VRT-Ketnet and RTBF-Ouftivi, with the participation of Super RTL. It is based on the animated short film 850 Meters, made by Thuristar and Lunanime.

== Premise ==
The series is set in the Dark Ages, and focuses on Jimmy the Squire, along with his friend, Cat the Princess, and his father, Henri of Orange, a chivalrous knight; as they all embark on fun adventures.

== Cast and characters ==
=== Main ===
- Jules de Jongh as Jimmy of Orange the Squire, son and squire of Henri of Orange. Jimmy is an unconventional squire, preferring to use his brain and to innovate rather than follow the tried and true-and questionable-brawn methods of other knights and squires. Jimmy is short for James.
- Kaycie Chase as Cat the Princess, a tomboy princess who likes to tag along with Jimmy and Henri on their adventures. Despite the disapproval of her elders, she dreams of being a knight one day and is quite acrobatic. Cat has two main outfits, often used in each show. One is her "typical princess" outfit, consisting of a full body dress with a chest plate. The other is her "Princess Knight" outfit, which consists of the same but a much shorter skirt and chain mail legs, which appear nearly the same as the other knights and squires. In one episode she modifies her outfit in homage to the Swan, and is dubbed "Little Swan" by the black rats. Cat is short for Catherine.
- David Gasman as Henri of Orange, Jimmy's good-natured but somewhat clueless father. Henri is a supportive father to his eccentric son, though he worries about including Cat on their kingdom-saving adventures. A talented musician, Henri is rarely without his trusty mandolin Mandy and rides into action on his trusty horse Torpedo, and is known for seeking to carry out his duties as a knight without regard for recognition.

=== Recurring ===
- Jules de Jongh as the Queen, Cat's mother from whom Cat is constantly trying to hide her adventures. Despite her apparent disapproval, the Queen has admitted to being an admirer of the Swan, a black-suited hero from her younger days. It is subsequently revealed that she was in fact the Swan, though she's gotten rusty due to loss of practice and old age.
- David Gasman as the Knight of Red, a knight who trains the squires in preparation for eventual knighthood; he evokes a stereotypical gym coach and carries a whistle with him everywhere.
- Perlin, the kingdom's resident wizard who is a tad absent-minded.
- Colbert, a short, bespectacled monk who handles the assignments of the various knights from the Quest Desk. In "Fearless Colbert" it is revealed that he trained as a knight but failed in the role due to his diminutive size, and ended up in his current career after standing in at the Quest Desk as a youth and maintaining the role by concealing his failure to graduate.
- Kaycie Chase as Ronnie Flash, a young boy of Jimmy and Cat's age who is Epic's resident news reporter.
- Harriet Carmichael as Lady Fontaine, Cat's teacher at Princess School. She is often frustrated by Cat's tomboyish behavior, while Cat is usually forced to escape her care in order to go on adventures.
- Cynthia, a blonde girl in Cat's class at school who wears her hair up; she is usually partnered with Lance when the squires and young ladies have classes together.
- Curt, a chubby young boy who is in Lance and Jimmy's class at Knight School; he lacks confidence and is often bullied by Lance, while Jimmy usually comes to his defense.
- Bjorn, a young dragon and son of the villainous Bad Jack. Unlike his father, Bjorn displays no real hostility towards the people of Epic and is even friends with Jimmy, occasionally helping him on his adventures.
- Christopher Ragland as Wilfred the White, an egotistical knight who cares more about his image than about actually carrying out the duties of a knight. He is the uncle of Lance, who serves as his squire, and is as contemptuous of Henri as his nephew is of Jimmy, though Henri is usually oblivious to Wilfred's taunts and belittling comments. Most of his attempted jabs at Henri's pride come from the House of Orange's coming from peasant stock rather than the traditional nobility-born knights. Wilfred is Epic's first knight, but achieved his position through trickery and seeks to maintain it through devious methods, such as teaming up with the Cursed Forest Witch.
- Christopher Ragland as Lance of White, Wilfred's squire and Jimmy's rival. Lance is a rich, spoiled brat who delights in antagonizing Jimmy, particularly when he or Henri does something embarrassing.
- Jules de Jongh as the Cursed Forest Witch, an evil witch who once lived in epic but was banished by the Queen; she now seeks to take over the kingdom using her dark magic. A running gag involves her being turned into a frog by her own magic.
- David Gasman as Bad Jack, Epic's most fearsome dragon and a frequent antagonist of Jimmy, Cat, and Henri. He spends more time seeking treasure and tormenting the people of Epic than with his son Bjorn, and is also distanced from his vegan, peace-loving brother Jeff.
- Christopher Ragland as the Black Rats, a group of human-sized anthropomorphic rats who wear grungy armor and colored masks, the latter being reminiscent of the Teenage Mutant Ninja Turtles (though the rats number five and have members with green and yellow masks but none with an orange one). They often menace travelers, either of their own accord or in alliance with other villains such as the Witch.
- The Cyclops, a one-eyed giant who rarely speaks but is an occasional menace to Epic, either of his own accord or as a pawn of other villains such as the Cursed Forest Witch. His greatest distinguishing feature is his obsession with knight armor, which is the primary motivation for most of his rampages.
- The Green Venom Witch, one of the various colleagues of the Cursed Forest Witch. At one point she took over the Cursed Forest Witch's hut due to the Cursed Forest Witch's failure to take over Epic, but was later expelled.
- Zerlin, aka Bathagalflupe the Dread-Zerlin the wizard's older brother and an evil sorcerer who wishes to rule over Epic. He enjoys using his dark magic to force others to do his bidding, but acknowledges his younger brother as the superior magic user except for Perlin's unwillingness to fight dirty.
- The Two-Headed Giant, whose two heads each have their own mind that don't always get along.
- The Rock Monster, an ape-like being made up of living rock who eats rocks.
- Various as the Knights, several near-identical knights who serve as background characters and comedy relief. Their features are obscured by their helmets, while the Queen's personal guard wear sunglasses and headsets in parody of the Secret Service. It is not uncommon for them to appear in their undergarments-wife beaters and boxer shorts-as a gag.

== Episodes ==
No. overall	No. in season	Title	Original U.S. air date	U.S. viewers (millions)
1	1	"How to Save a Princess"	January 2, 2017	0.67
When Jimmy shows off at an exercise about "how to save a princess" from a tower, Cat gets kidnapped by Bad Jack.
2	2	"The Cat and the Swan"	January 2, 2017	0.98
To celebrate the Dragon New Year, Bad Jack plans to throw Henri and Jimmy into a bottomless pit.
3	3	"Witch Hunters"	January 3, 2017	0.83
When the evil witch turns all the knights into frogs but Henri, he's the only one who can save the kingdom.
4	4	"Bad Bad Mandolin"	January 3, 2017	0.82
When Jimmy loses his dad's prized mandolin, he makes a deal with a witch to replace it.
5	5	"Epic Ballroom"	January 4, 2017	0.78
When Jimmy and Lance's bickering gets in the way of them serving Henri and Wilfried in battle and now they need to learn to work together, like partners.
6	6	"Fashion Victims"	January 4, 2017	0.78
When the entire realm is blindly selling out and wearing Wilfried's line of clothing, Jimmy refuses, determined stay true to his family colour.
7	7	"Attack of the 50ft Squire"	January 5, 2017	0.63
When Jimmy finds he's too small to complete a squire competition in gym class, he sneaks a swig of Perlin's magic growing potion.
8	8	"The Helmet of Epic"	January 5, 2017	0.63
Jimmy gets a helmet that will make him a fearless super-warrior (and impress his dad), but the gear turns out to be a cursed ‘baddie magnet’.
9	9	"The Challenge"	January 6, 2017	0.87
After a foolhardy challenge causes Jimmy and Lance to be captured by Bad Jack, Henri and Wilfried must team up to save their squires.
10	10	"Queen's Guard"	January 6, 2017	0.87
After Jimmy and Cat stop thieves from robbing the Queen, Cat hides so her mother doesn’t discover she's ditching school again.
11	11	"The Road Knight"	January 9, 2017	0.66
When the Black Rats are attacking all convoys supplying the kingdom, Henri is sent with a supercarriage to defeat them.
12	12	"Epic Traffic"	January 10, 2017	0.50
When Jimmy pushes his dad into ‘good-deed overdrive’ to be First Knight, Henri goes too far and gets busted down to ‘Horse traffic duty.
13	13	"The Stinky Swamp Witch"	January 11, 2017	0.67
When Jimmy and Cat find a witch's broom, they can’t resist taking it for a spin, but the fun quickly ends, as they inflame the rage of every witch.
14	14	"The Harvest Festival"	January 12, 2017	0.57
After Bad Jack burns their crops, the Queen asks Henri to lift her subjects' spirits by composing a song.
15	15	"Treasure Trap"	January 13, 2017	0.60
Henri and Bad Jack race to find an extremely rare treasure; Jimmy lies to Bjorn, and must try to fix their friendship.
16	16	"Guess Who's Coming for Dinner"	January 17, 2017	0.52
When the bad Witch stays with Henri and Jimmy, Jimmy and Cat believe it is part of a plot to kidnap the Queen.
17	17	"Fearless Colbert"	January 18, 2017	0.63
Jimmy and Cat learn that Colbert never completed his field exam, and he must go on a field mission with Henri to keep his job.
18	18	"Cat's in the Bag"	January 19, 2017	0.45
Cat is feeling down about her prospects of becoming a knight, and Henri tries to save her with a song, which sends her on a solo quest.
19	19	"Talent Show"	January 20, 2017	0.65
Henri offers to help Jimmy win the school talent show, but one of the judges turns out to be a witch in disguise.
20	20	"The Good Jack"	January 23, 2017	0.56
After Bad Jack is banished from the kingdom, and replaced with his brother, Jimmy joins forces with Bad Jack to oust Jeff.
21	21	"Henri the Felon"	January 24, 2017	0.48
When the Queen is kidnapped by a witch, Wilfried becomes regent, and arrests Henri for breaking his new laws.
22	22	"Epically Small"	January 25, 2017	0.65
The Queen begins to shrink after eating a lollipop, and Jimmy and Henri must capture a witch to get the antidote.
23	23	"Ronny and the Rock Monster"	January 26, 2017	0.63
Jimmy convinces Ronny Flash to interview a rock monster, and then must accompany him into the Dark Lands.
24	24	"The Dragon Rider"	February 1, 2017	0.34
To impress the other squires, Jimmy pretends that Bjorn is his pet and Bad Jack threatens to burn Epic to the ground.
25	25	"Cease Fire"	February 2, 2017	0.28
The Queen calls a truce during battles in order to give her nights a break, and the two sides enjoy a minstrel concert.
26	26	"The Sorcerers"	February 3, 2017	0.33
When Jimmy and Cat use science to win the sorcery faire, their classmates believe they are masters of the Dark Arts.
27	27	"Parent/Children Day"	February 6, 2017	0.33
Jimmy encourages Cat and Bjorn to spend the day with their parents, but the Queen and Bad Jack's plans interfere.
28	28	"Lucky Tooth"	February 7, 2017	0.51
Henri believes he wins fights because of his lucky charm ritual, and loses his confidence when the charm is stolen.
29	29	"Back to School"	February 8, 2017	0.31
Caught trading assignments, Colbert assigns the knights to return to Squire School to relearn the spirit of true knighting.
30	30	"The Mean Team"	February 9, 2017	0.51
The Cursed Forest Witch and Bad Jack create a deadly duo.
31	31	"My Dad and Me"	February 10, 2017	0.42
Jimmy complains that he is treated like a baby.
32	32	"Caught on Tape"	February 13, 2017	0.41
Lance gets a hold of a video taken of Cat in action against the Cyclops and uses it to blackmail her and Jimmy, forcing them to find a way to get it back.
33	33	"Red Dawn"	February 14, 2017	0.27
Zerlin kidnaps the Knight of Red in order to create an army of evil clones, but things get complicated when Jimmy, Henry, and Cat come to his rescue.
34	34	"No So Fast"	June 5, 2017	0.13
Jimmy loses Torpedo after making a bet with Lance and losing, and Torpedo ends up in the hands of the Black Rats just as Henri needs him for an important delivery.
35	35	"Princess Jimmy"	June 6, 2017	N/A
Cat and Cynthia are assigned to work together on a fashion project after they continue to squabble, but their model-Jimmy-gets kidnapped after he's mistaken for a princess.
36	36	"Kurt the Shining Squire"	June 7, 2017	N/A
Jimmy and Cat try to help Curt stand up to Lance, and recruit him for a mission to spy on the giants.
37	37	"Old Red"	June 8, 2017	N/A
The Red Knight's father arrives for a visit and learns that his son teaches gym rather than serving as First Knight; a disgraced Red sets out to redeem himself.
38	38	"Jimmy Works Out"	June 9, 2017	N/A
Jimmy is convinced that his slight frame isn't suited to knighthood, so he decides to bulk up-but gets carried away.
39	39	"Sleeping Jack"	June 12, 2017	0.15
Bad Jack leaves Bjorn to guard his horde while he gets some much needed rest, and Bjorn does his best to convince any would be thieves that Jack is awake and kicking.
40	40	"The Return of the Swan"	June 13, 2017	N/A
Cynthia poses as Epic's legendary female hero, the Swan.
41	41	"The Leak"	June 14, 2017	N/A
The Witch sends the Black Rats to sneak into Epic Castle through the plumbing.
42	42	"Who's The Squire"	June 15, 2017	0.23
Cat dons a helmet to enter the Squire Competition incognito, but soon runs into trouble when her competitive nature gets the best of her.
43	43	"Not So Angry Knight"	June 16, 2017	N/A
The Knights are called upon to assist the princesses and squires in a real-life game of Angry Knights, but Jimmy struggles with Henri's unfailingly cheer disposition.
44	44	"Invisible Jimmy"	June 19, 2017	N/A
Looking to get revenge on Lance, Jimmy gets his hands on an invisibility potion that comes in handy against the Black Rats.
45	45	"Henri the Rockstar"	June 20, 2017	N/A
Henri rights a song that makes him an overnight musical success but distracts him from serving as a knight and from being a good father.
46	46	"Operation Apple Pie"	June 21, 2017	N/A
Cat's mother asks her to babysit her cousin just as Wicked Crumble, the Poison Apple Witch, puts most of Epic's knights to sleep.
47	47	"Mischief at Princess High"	June 22, 2017	N/A
The trio must convince Lady Fontaine to return to Princess High after she quits.
48	48	"Getting Cheesy"	June 23, 2017	N/A
After the three heroes are abducted by the Black Rats, the Cursed Forest Witch blackmails Cat into taking her into Epic in disguise.
49	49	"At Her Majesty's Service"	June 26, 2017	0.20
Jimmy and Henri go undercover as servants to investigate the suspicious activities of Cat's aunt Hildegard, who becomes caught up in a plot between Wilfred and the Witch.
50	50	"My Knight, My Dragon, and Me"	June 27, 2017	0.14
After their latest secret video game session is thwarted by Henri's early return, Jimmy and Bjorn attempt to make their fathers bond so that they don't have to hide their own friendship.
51	51	"The Swan's Biggest Fan"	June 28, 2017	N/A
In order to prove the existence of the Swan, Jimmy and Cat visit the Black Rats' lair.
52	52	"Epic Dream"	June 29, 2017	N/A
The people of Epic find themselves forced into a magical shared dream. This episode is done mostly in the animation typically reserved for expositions or dream sequences, and also serves as a Clip show.

== Broadcast ==
My Knight and Me premiered in Wallonia on OUFtivi in Belgium on August 28, 2016. It premiered in France on Télétoon+ on November 3, 2016 and on Ketnet in Flanders (Belgium) on December 24, 2016.

The series made its English premiere on Boomerang UK and Ireland on November 1, 2016 and it premiered in the US on January 2, 2017, on Cartoon Network. and Boomerang in April. It was pulled from the network after 33 episodes due to low ratings; the series later aired on Boomerang starting on April 3, 2017 until it was later removed off the channel on June 3, 2018.

My Knight and Me premiered on Boomerang Australia on March 4, 2017.

In Canada, Family Channel premiered it on April 16, 2017, and on its sister channel Family CHRGD on July 2, 2018.

In Germany and the Netherlands respectively, it airs on Super RTL and Ketnet.
