= Mighty Mike (TV series) =

2019 French animated television series

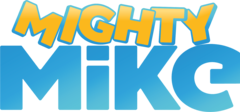
- Genre: Comedy; Slapstick
- Created by: Guillaume Hellouin
- Music by: Maxime Barzel; Paul-Étienne Côté
- Countries of origin: France; Canada
- No. of seasons: 1
- No. of episodes: 26 (78 segments)

Production
- Executive producers: Corrine Kouper; Louis-Simon Ménard
- Producer: Virginie Lavallée
- Running time: 22 minutes (7 minutes per segment)
- Production companies: TeamTO; Digital Dimension

Original release
- Network: France 3 (France); Ici Radio-Canada Télé (French Canadian); Family Channel (Canada); Universal Kids (United States)
- Release: March 14, 2019 – 2020

Mighty Mike is an animated television series created by Guillaume Hellouin. The series is a co-production between French studio TeamTO and Canadian studio Digital Dimension, produced in association with France Télévisions, Super RTL, UYoung, Radio-Canada and Family Channel, and Cake Entertainment handling worldwide distribution.

== Plot ==
The series follows Mike, a pug, as he tries to gain the affection of his canine neighbour, whilst clashing with two mischievous raccoons.

== Characters ==
- Mike is a refined and sophisticated pug who is responsible for defending his house from two mischievous raccoons and three troublesome turtles. He also needs to protect little Fluffy the Cat from any danger whatsoever.
- Fluffy is a small orange kitten who is the second pet of Mike's owners, the Mikkelsen Family. Though he's still a kitten, he is always seen wandering off on his own or causing little havoc around the house, which sometimes leads to Mike's overprotectiveness of him.
- Iris is a white female Chinese Crested Dog who serves as Mike's love interest (and his many attempts to impress her). When enraged, Iris uses her tail to swat objects. She uses it on the raccoons when they try to steal things from Mike and herself.
- Athos, Porthos, and Aramis are three lively turtles who like playing sports, especially baseball, in spite of their species. Their names are a reference to The Three Musketeers.
- Freddy and Mercury are two mischievous raccoons who are always causing mischief in every episode. Freddy is the leader of the duo, and always assisting Mercury to do things his own way. Both names are a play on the late British singer-songwriter, Freddie Mercury.
- Iris' owner - They play the role of being the owner of Iris and persuading her to look after her stuff while they're gone.
- The Mikkelsen Family are a family of unseen humans and the owners of Mike, Fluffy, Athos, Porthos, and Aramis. In a few episodes, they are heard and their feet and legs are briefly seen. The family consists of Stephan (the father), Laura (the mother), Louise (eldest child/daughter), and Tom (youngest child/son).

== Broadcast ==
The series airs on Boomerang in France. In 2019 it was announced that the show would air on CITV and Boomerang in the United Kingdom, as well as Universal Kids in the United States and ABC Me in Australia.
