= Angelo Rules =

Animated television series

- Genre: Comedy; Animated sitcom
- Based on: Comment Faire Enrager... by: Sylvie De Mathuisieulx; Sebastien Diologent
- Developed by: Genevieve Dexter
- Composer: Vincent Boutolleau
- Countries of origin: France; United Kingdom (seasons 1–5)
- Original languages: English; French
- No. of seasons: 6
- No. of episodes: 321

Production
- Executive producers: Corinne Kouper (seasons 1–5); Tom van Waveren (seasons 1–5); Genevieve Dexter (season 1); Guillaume Hellouin; Caroline Souris (season 1); Christophe Archambault (season 1); Edward Galton (seasons 1–5); Tara Sibel Demren (season 6)
- Producers: Corinne Kouper; Marco Balsamo (season 6)
- Running time: 7 minutes (season 1); 11 minutes (seasons 2–6); 21 minutes (specials)
- Production companies: TeamTO; Cake Entertainment (seasons 1–5); France Télévisions; Expand Drama (season 1)

Original release
- Network: France 3, France 4 and Télétoon+ (France); Cartoon Network (Europe)
- Release: January 1, 2010 – present

Angelo Rules (French: Angelo la Débrouille) is an animated television series based on the book series Comment Faire Enrager... by Sylvie De Mathuisieulx and Sebastien Diologent. It first aired on January 1, 2010. The series is produced by French studio TeamTO with the co-production of British entertainment company Cake Entertainment for the first five seasons and French production company Expand Drama for the first season, with the participation of France Télévisions, Télétoon+, Super RTL (seasons 3–present) and Canal+ (seasons 5–present).

On 29 November 2021, the series was renewed for a fifth season of 45 episodes, which premiered in August 2022.

On May 8, 2024, it was announced that a sixth season of Angelo Rules was in production, which premiered in early 2026.

== Plot ==
Angelo is the kid who tries to be the wise guy. He is constantly coming up with plans and strategies to get out of trouble. He has determined as well that nothing will stand in the way of getting what he wants, and he actually embraces challenges.

Angelo is not disturbed by the natural setbacks most children have to confront such as parents, siblings and rules, but that doesn't deter him. He has friends who also help him in his strategic planning, like the logistical Sherwood and the enthusiastic Lola. Together, they make a winning trio.

== Voice cast ==
=== English ===
- Jennifer Visalli as Angelo (season 1)
- Julie Alexandria as Angelo (season 2)
- Emma Galvin as Angelo (seasons 3–5), Elena (seasons 2–5), Ethan (seasons 2–5)
- Aaron Conley as Sherwood (season 1)
- Koko Joseph as Sherwood (season 2)
- Khaliah Adams as Sherwood (seasons 3–5), AJ (seasons 3–5), Gigi (seasons 3–5)
- Cassandra Lee Morris (Note: Credited as Cassandra Morris in seasons 1 and 4 and Cassandra Lee in season 2.) as Lola (seasons 1–4)
- Alexa Magro as Lola (season 5), Peter (season 5)
- Doug Trapp (Note: Credited as John Douglas in seasons 1–4.) as Dad
- Gail Thomas (Note: Credited as G.A. Quinn in season 2.) as Mom, Miss Perla, Cathy
- Jackson Rheingold as Peter (seasons 1–4)
- Michelle Layton as Elena (season 1)
- Bill Morgan as Mr. Foot
- Danny McDermott as Manetti
- Carter Jackson as Coach Zonka (season 1)
- Nate Rheingold as Cooper
- Katie DiCicco as Tracy, Candy (seasons 2–5), Brandy (seasons 2–5)
- Gerry Rosenthal (Note: Credited as Gerry Ray in seasons 2–4.) as Schmitty, Hunter (seasons 2–5), Alonzo (seasons 2–5), Clyde (seasons 2–5)
- Jay Kat as Geezer (seasons 2–5), Damien Burst (seasons 2–5), Coach Zonka (seasons 2–5)
- Misty Lee as Butterfingers (season 5), Monica (season 5)

=== French ===
- Susan Sindberg as Angelo (season 1)
- Jackie Berger as Victor (seasons 1–3), additional voices
- Frédérique Marlot as Lola, Eliott, additional voices
- Céline Melloul as Alvina, Pierre, Gladys, Lucie (seasons 3–present), Enzo, JB, Gigi, additional voices
- Nathalie Bienaimé as Mom, Miss Perla, Olivia, Annie, Brice, additional voices
- Patrick Pellegrin as Dad, Manetti, Gilbert, Coach Zonka
- Vincent de Boüard as Yoann, Eddie, Ollie Van Dunk, Vigile (seasons 3–present)
- Jean-Pierre Leblan as Mr. Leroux, additional voices
- Marie Diot as Angelo (season 2)
- Brigitte Lecordier as Victor (seasons 4–present)

== Episodes ==
=== Season 1 (2010) ===
All Season 1 episodes were directed by Chloé Miller.

No. overall	No. in season	Title	Written by	Storyboard by	Original release date
1	1	"Detention"	Andy Rheingold	TBA	January 1, 2010
Angelo attempts to get Sherwood out of detention so they can play a basketball match against Alonzo and Clyde.
2	2	"Cat Box" "Toilettes de chats"	Agnés Bidaud	TBA	January 1, 2010
Angelo doesn't want to clean up the cat's litter so badly, that he decides to potty train it!
3	3	"Yakking it Up" "Catch de yacks"	Anne D. Bernstein	TBA	January 1, 2010
Angelo and Sherwood are dying to see a late night yak wrestling match on TV but Angelo's parents won't allow it, unless Angelo can change the time on all the clocks in the house.
4	4	"The Greatest Free Sample Ever"	Rick Groel	TBA	February 1, 2010
5	5	"Go Mental Fest"	Greg Grabianski	TBA	February 1, 2010
6	6	"Clean Break"	Etienne Jeantet	TBA	February 1, 2010
7	7	"Battle Underwear"	Greg Grabianski	TBA	February 2, 2010
8	8	"Pop Quiz"	Anne D. Bernstein	TBA	February 2, 2010
9	9	"Picked Last"	Andy Rheingold	TBA	February 2, 2010
10	10	"Lords of the Prize"	Tom Krajewski	TBA	February 2, 2010
11	11	"Bolivia Exports Farts"	Rick Groel	TBA	February 2, 2010
12	12	"A Fish Called Mr. Bubble"	Andy Rheingold	TBA	February 2, 2010
13	13	"Snack Thief"	Fanny Meschaaert	TBA	February 3, 2010
14	14	"Spitball Wars" "La guerre des boulettes"	Greg Grabianski	TBA	February 3, 2010
15	15	"Let Manetti Win"	Scott Sonneborn	TBA	February 3, 2010
16	16	"A Longer Recess"	Isabelle De Catalogne	TBA	May 6, 2010
17	17	"Chore Wars"	Greg Grabianski	TBA	May 6, 2010
18	18	"Changing the Channel"	Andy Rheingold	TBA	May 6, 2010
19	19	"Riding the Dragontail"	Andy Rheingold	TBA	May 7, 2010
20	20	"The Great Wait"	Anne D. Bernstein	TBA	May 7, 2010
21	21	"Adorable Horrible Peter"	Greg Grabianski	TBA	May 7, 2010
22	22	"Who Killed the Rabbit?"	Rick Groel	TBA	May 8, 2010
23	23	"Stop the Experimental Music"	Gwendoline Raisson	TBA	May 8, 2010
24	24	"No Substitute"	Andy Rheingold	TBA	May 8, 2010
25	25	"The Casserole"	Greg Grabianski	TBA	May 9, 2010
26	26	"Out of the Saddle"	Sébastien Viaud	TBA	May 9, 2010
27	27	"Angelo's Blunder"	Sylvie Barro; Kathryn Walton-Ward	TBA	May 9, 2010
28	28	"The Sneeze"	Rick Groel	TBA	May 10, 2010
29	29	"Shame of Lame"	Greg Grabianski	TBA	May 10, 2010
30	30	"Here Comes the Judge"	Andy Rheingold	TBA	May 10, 2010
31	31	"Break Up"	Benjamin Richard	TBA	June 12, 2010
32	32	"The Fake Sick Day"	Rick Groël	TBA	June 12, 2010
33	33	"The Kid who has Everything"	Andy Rheingold	TBA	June 12, 2010
34	34	"Zonka's Death March"	Rick Groel	TBA	June 18, 2010
35	35	"The Beach" "La plage"	Greg Grabianski	TBA	June 18, 2010
36	36	"Collect Them All" "La collection"	Anne D. Bernstein	TBA	June 18, 2010
37	37	"Manetti's Crush"	Anne D. Bernstein	TBA	June 30, 2010
38	38	"Manetti Must Not Fail"	Rick Groel	TBA	June 30, 2010
39	39	"Help! My Friends are Falling in Love!"	Adam Lane	TBA	June 30, 2010
40	40	"The Brush Off"	Anne D. Bernstein	TBA	July 23, 2010
41	41	"A Little Romance"	Clélia Constantine	TBA	July 23, 2010
42	42	"Mission: Frog"	Romain Van Liemt; Clélia Constantine	TBA	July 23, 2010
43	43	"USB Mine"	Julien Magnat	TBA	August 14, 2010
44	44	"School Heist"	Andy Rheingold	TBA	August 14, 2010
45	45	"Working Hard"	Andy Rheingold	TBA	August 14, 2010
46	46	"Scary Movie" "La nuit de l'horreur"	Thierry Gaudin	TBA	August 15, 2010
47	47	"Final Countdown"	Thierry Gaudin	TBA	August 15, 2010
48	48	"Thar He Blows!"	Edouard Blanchot; Jean-Christophe Derrien	TBA	August 15, 2010
49	49	"Yesterbirthday"	Dominique Latil	TBA	August 17, 2010
50	50	"Career Day"	Dominique Latil	TBA	August 17, 2010
51	51	"The Break in"	Clélia Constantine	TBA	August 17, 2010
52	52	"Director's Cut"	Andy Rheingold	TBA	September 2, 2010
53	53	"One Shot"	Rick Groel	TBA	September 2, 2010
54	54	"The Chimp Sleeps Tonight"	Nicolas Digard; Benjamin Richard	TBA	September 2, 2010
55	55	"Savant Idiot"	Régis Jaulin; David Tardé	Léonard Adolf	October 1, 2010
56	56	"Face the Music"	Thierry Gaudin	TBA	October 1, 2010
57	57	"The Thousandth" "Le millième"	Delphine Dubos	TBA	October 1, 2010
58	58	"Fearless" "Même pas peur"	Nicolas Digard; Benjamin Richard	Pierre Cerutti	October 5, 2010
59	59	"Dirty Politics"	Clélia Constantine	Léonard Adolf	October 5, 2010
60	60	"Friend vs. Friend"	Andy Rheingold	TBA	October 5, 2010
61	61	"The Audition Mission" "L'audition"	Nicolas Digard; Benjamin Richard	TBA	October 10, 2010
62	62	"Tea Time"	Benjamin Richard; Nicolas Digard	TBA	October 10, 2010
63	63	"Wanna Piece of Me?"	Andy Rheingold	TBA	October 10, 2010
64	64	"The List" "La liste"	Nicolas Digard; Benjamin Richard	TBA	November 11, 2010
65	65	"Shower Up"	Nicolas Digard; Benjamin Richard	TBA	November 11, 2010
66	66	"The Fever"	Dominique Latil	TBA	November 11, 2010
67	67	"In the Bag"	Dominique Latil	TBA	December 7, 2010
68	68	"King of the Sidewalk"	Andy Rheingold	TBA	December 7, 2010
69	69	"Money Money Money" "Megabingodingo"	Clélia Constantine	TBA	December 7, 2010
70	70	"Cereal Zombie" "Céréale zombi"	Edouard Blanchot; Jean-Christophe Derrien	TBA	December 17, 2010
71	71	"Picture Perfect"	Delphine Dubos	TBA	December 17, 2010
72	72	"Career Test"	Clélia Constantine	Khalil Ben Naamane	December 17, 2010
73	73	"Sherwood's Fault"	Régis Jaulin; David Tardé	Léonard Adolf	December 29, 2010
74	74	"Curse"	Jean-Christophe Derrien	TBA	December 29, 2010
75	75	"Cool Kid"	Benjamin Richard	TBA	December 29, 2010
76	76	"The Book Club"	Jean-Christophe Derrien	TBA	December 30, 2010
77	77	"Manettied"	Benjamin Richard	TBA	December 30, 2010
78	78	"Ticking Clock"	Benjamin Richard	TBA	December 30, 2010

=== Angelo's Tips (2010-11) ===
Alongside the main series, there is also a companion series of 30 one-minute episodes made under the title Angelo's Tips. All shorts were directed by Franz Kirchner.

No.	Title	Written by	Original release date
1	"Athletic Skills" "Vive le sport !"	Clélia Constantine	January 7, 2010
2	"Girls and their Phone" "Les filles et leur téléphone"	Clélia Constantine	January 14, 2010
3	"Bullies" "Les gros durs"	Clélia Constantine	January 21, 2010
4	"Feed Your Pet" "Nourrir un chat"	Clélia Constantine	January 28, 2010
5	"Bullies in Love" "Les gros durs ont un cœur"	Clélia Constantine	March 4, 2010
6	"Cats" "Les chats"	Clélia Constantine	March 10, 2010
7	"Mom's Cooking" "La cuisine de Maman"	Clélia Constantine	March 18, 2010
8	"Little Brothers" "Les petits frères"	Clélia Constantine	April 5, 2010
9	"Slow School" "Accélérer les cours"	Clélia Constantine	April 6, 2010
10	"Love Birds" "Ah, l'amour"	Clélia Constantine	April 7, 2010
11	"After School" "Après l'école"	Clélia Constantine	April 8, 2010
12	"Waking Up" "Debout !"	Clélia Constantine	July 7, 2010
13	"Being Popular" "Être populaire"	Nicolas Digard	August 2, 2010
14	"Free Fun" "S'éclater sans se ruiner"	Clélia Constantine	August 9, 2010
15	"Look Clever" "Avoir l'air intelligent"	Nicolas Digard	August 16, 2010
16	"Good Shape" "Cours toujours"	Franz Kirchner	August 23, 2010
17	"Coaches are the Worst" "Impitoyable prof de sport"	Nicolas Digard	August 30, 2010
18	"Mom Won't Buy Me Nothing" "Faire craquer sa maman"	Nicolas Digard	July 11, 2011
19	"Noisy Little Brothers" "Faire taire son petit frère"	Franz Kirchner	July 18, 2011
20	"I Broke Something" "Éviter d'être puni"	Nicolas Digard	July 25, 2011
21	"Art Critic" "L'art d'être artiste"	Nicolas Digard	August 1, 2011
22	"Behave Like a Teenager" "Les ados"	Clélia Constantine	August 8, 2011
23	"Act Like a Star" "Sortir le grand jeu"	Nicolas Digard	August 15, 2011
24	"Dads are Ridiculous" "Danger, papa à l'approche !"	Nicolas Digard	August 22, 2011
25	"Parents Are So Unfair" "Parents injustes"	Nicolas Digard	August 29, 2011
26	"Eating Fruits" "Manger des fruits"	Nicolas Digard	September 5, 2011
27	"Fun without Videogames" "S'amuser sans jeu vidéo"	Nicolas Digard	September 19, 2011
28	"Big Sisters" "Les grandes sœurs"	Nicolas Digard	September 26, 2011
29	"Fun Teachers" "Drôles de profs"	Nicolas Digard	October 1, 2011
30	"Getting Around" "Rapide comme l'éclair"	Nicolas Digard	October 8, 2011

=== Season 2 (2012–13) ===
All Season 2 episodes were directed by Chloé Miller and Franz Kirchner.

No. overall	No. in season	Title	Written by	Storyboard by	Original release date
79	1	"Junkboy" "Bon à jeter"	Greg Grabianski	Christian De Vita	July 27, 2012
When Angelo's parents want to sell all of his favorite old toys at a rummage sale, Angelo schemes how to save his stuff from being sold.
80	2	"Kick-it Ball" "Shootball"	Andy Rheingold	Chloé Miller; Franz Kirchner	August 2, 2012
Angelo and friends' attempt to play their weekly Kick It Ball game is disrupted by Shmitty who also claims the basketball court.
81	3	"Game Off" "Arrêt de jeu"	Greg Grabianski	Alban Rodriguez	August 8, 2012
Mom confiscates a new video game from Angelo and gives to Dad for safe keeping. Angelo tries to get the game back, but it is impossible because Dad is now hooked on the game.
82	4	"The Sandman Cometh" "La nuit la plus longue"	Rick Groel	Christian Kuntz	August 16, 2012
Angelo and friends attempt to stay up all night in order to prove they deserve later bedtimes, but will anyone make it to sunrise?
83	5	"Bullicus Smarticus" "Bruticus malinus"	Rick Groel	Alexandre Hesse	August 23, 2012
Angelo meets his match for the first time when Tracy Flickinger arrives at school and they face off in an epic high noon hallway showdown.
84	6	"The Cool Hat" "Chapeau !"	Anne D. Bernstein	Amanda Sun	August 31, 2012
When Alonzo wears a new hat to school he instantly becomes super popular and is offered special favors usually given to Angelo. So Angelo changes his look and tries to figure out what is the coolest hat ever.
85	7	"Spoiler Alert" "Rien vu, rien entendu"	Benjamin Richard; Thérésia Rippel	Alban Rodriguez	September 7, 2012
Angelo couldn't watch the Yak Wrestling finals on TV last night. Everyone at school has seen it but him, and it's all everybody's talking about - even Sherwood. Angelo is going to have to come up with tons of tricks in order to view the game without someone spoiling the score for him.
86	8	"How to Dismantle an Alien Attack" "Attaque extra-terrestre"	Rick Groel	Christian Kuntz	September 14, 2012
Angelo sets out to pull off the greatest alien attack prank ever, but when his mom fills in for Mr. Foot he has to dismantle it instead.
87	9	"Operation Waterpark" "Tous à l'eau"	Greg Grabianski	Alexandre Hesse	September 21, 2012
Angelo goes all out in an attempt to get his family out of bed and on the road before 5 a.m. to get to an awesome water park before it opens.
88	10	"Doy to the World" "Tête de nouille"	Andy Rheingold; Story by : Nate Rheingold	Amanda Sun	September 28, 2012
Peter and Cooper use the word "doy" non-stop which drives Angelo batty. So Angelo comes up with every strategy he can think of to try to get the little guys to stop.
89	11	"Book War" "La guerre des livres"	Andy Rheingold; Story by : Jackson Rheingold	Alban Rodriguez	October 5, 2012
Peter and Cooper sell handmade books by the dozen, which inspires Angelo to do the same. But the little guys have much better results, which fuels Angelo to beat them.
90	12	"Ninja for Hire" "Ninja à louer"	Greg Grabianski	Christian Kuntz	October 12, 2012
Angelo needs to make some extra money so he takes on a part time job - as a ninja.
91	13	"Wiznimals" "Wiznimaux"	Clélia Constantine; Thérésia Rippel; Romain Van Liemt; Benjamin Richard	Christian De Vita	October 19, 2012
Angelo thought he could relax this weekend but then he's assigned a real chore: taking his baby brother Peter to the Wiznimal convention - those super-annoying toy animals that kids are crazy about. Card games, video games, cartoons, stuffed toys, they're everywhere - and they really are annoying. How can Angelo get Peter to outgrow them - and get his Saturday back?
92	14	"Ping Pong" "Ping et Pong"	Andy Rheingold	Alexandre Hesse	November 2, 2012
Angelo and friends train Geezer to become the Community Center's ping pong championship in exchange for Geezer pretending to be Angelo's "fake Grandpa" and attend his sure to be bad news parent-teacher conference with Mr. Foot.
93	15	"Bring it Back" "Rendez-nous le basket"	Clélia Constantine; Benjamin Richard; Romain Van Liemt	Alban Rodriguez	November 9, 2012
On Tracy's suggestion, Coach Zonka has decided to replace basketball with - rhythmic gymnastics. No way. There's got to be a way of convincing the whole class that basketball is the best sport there is.
94	16	"Buddy Page" "Maman high-tech"	Benjamin Richard; Thérésia Rippel	Christian De Vita	October 26, 2012
Angelo's family keep embarrassing him in front of his friends on Buddypage, the latest popular social network. But how do you get your mom, dad, sister and brother to unfriend you without starting a family feud?
95	17	"Courtroom TV" "Le procès du siècle"	Clélia Constantine; Benjamin Richard	Alexandre Hesse	November 23, 2012
Angelo wants to set up the old TV in his room, now that his parents have bought a new one. But his big sister wants it too. How can he prevail? Easy. He just needs to set up a mock court room and plea like they do in his parents' TV shows.
96	18	"Damage Remote Control" "Télécommandé"	Benjamin Richard; Thérésia Rippel	Christian De Vita; Margaux Zinsner	November 30, 2012
Angelo's dad has bought a super-hi-tech remote-control that controls everything in the house - and Angelo's just broken it. How can he replace it without his Dad finding out? Easy: fake all of the remote's functions with Sherwood's help - while Lola works the guarantee.
97	19	"Family Game Night" "Soirée jeux"	Alana Sanko	Alban Rodriguez	November 16, 2012
Dad and Angelo develop a fierce rivalry to win at the weekly Family Game Night, with Angelo always losing. So Angelo schemes on ways to beat his dad.
98	20	"Fame" "Pour la gloire"	Rick Groel	Christian De Vita; Margaux Zinsner	December 7, 2012
Angelo sets out to make Sherwood famous, but a viral video makes him famous for the wrong reasons when he introduces the expression "achibada" to the world's vocabulary.
99	21	"The Funniest Kid" "Le comique de l'année"	Greg Grabianski	Jean Duval	December 14, 2012
Angelo thinks he's a lock to be voted "Funniest Kid In School" again, but his title is unexpectedly challenged - by Lola.
100	22	"Silent Treatment" "Le roi du silence"	Benjamin Richard; Thérésia Rippel	Alexandre Hesse	December 21, 2012
Tracy challenges Angelo: she bets him she can hold back on tattlling longer than he can go without talking. Angelo is up for it. But Tracy will go to any lengths to win this thing, including barging into his own home uninvited. How can Angelo make her slip without unsealing his lips?
101	23	"Catch that Cat" "Chat ch'est chur"	Benjamin Richard; Thérésia Rippel	Alban Rodriguez	December 28, 2012
Cathy has entrusted Angelo and Lola to take care of her cat for the day - in return, they can binge on pies all they will. Great deal, right? Unless the cat escapes the second it touches the ground. How do you persuade a reluctant cat to get back into its cage?
102	24	"Soccer Tryouts" "Fou de foot"	Dominique Latil	Christian De Vita; Margaux Zinsner	January 4, 2013
Sherwood is devastated; he was late for tryouts and won't be on the soccer team this year. Unless - Who said you could only demonstrate your soccer skills on a soccer field? Certainly not Angelo.
103	25	"No Take Backs" "Reprendre c'est voler"	Benjamin Richard; Thérésia Rippel	Jean Duval	January 11, 2013
While he was distracted by his video game, Angelo accidentally gave Peter his Slobber concert VIP access bracelet. And his mom won't budge: once you're given something, you can't take it back. Angelo only has a few hours to convince Peter to give up the bracelet - which he seems most unwilling to let go of.
104	26	"Fieldtrip of Dreams" "Privés de sortie"	Benjamin Richard; Thérésia Rippel	Christian De Vita; Margaux Zinsner	January 18, 2013
This year, Mr Foot has organized a field trip to - an experimental play by Damien Brousse. Since tattle-tale Tracy absolutely wants to see the play, Angelo is going to have to plot in the shadows to spare the whole class endless boredom.
105	27	"Door to Door to Door" "Porte à Porte à Porte"	Rick Groel	Jean Duval	January 25, 2013
Angelo and friends face off against Tracy in a battle to see who can sell the most wrapping paper for a school fundraiser.
106	28	"Heatwave" "Chaud devant"	Greg Grabianski	Alexandre Hesse	February 1, 2013
Angelo and friends want to be the first to master a difficult new skateboarding move, but to do so they have to find a way to beat a massive heatwave that makes it impossible to practice outside.
107	29	"Clean Up!" "Tout doit disparaître"	Greg Grabianski	Alban Rodriguez	February 8, 2013
Angelo attempts to discreetly clean up a moldy ant covered sandwich he had hidden in his room - without getting busted.
108	30	"When Peter Attacks!" "Pierre attaque !"	Jean-Philippe Robin	Christian De Vita; Margaux Zinsner	February 15, 2013
Angelo persuades Mr. Foot to let him use the IT room over the weekend; officially, he'll be researching biology - unofficially? He'll be playing video games online. But come the weekend, it turns out he must babysit Peter. Angelo decides to bring him along and entrust him to Schmitty's care while he plays his games. Except Peter escapes Schmitty's watch.
109	31	"Cabin Fever" "Le syndrome des sardines en boîtes"	Matthieu Chevallier; Jean-Philippe Robin	Alexandre Hesse	February 22, 2013
Angelo has been waiting for the weekend to get his parents to sign a test that he failed, to make sure they're as relaxed as can be. Tough luck: a storm breaks out, crushing everyone's plans. Tensions rise, and it looks like Angelo has picked the worst time to break the news about his test. He must find a way to ease the tension - fast.
110	32	"Frontier Family" "Pas lu, pas pris"	Rick Groel	Jean Duval	March 1, 2013
When Mr. Foot assigns a long book for the class to read, Angelo sets out to prove that he will know all he needs to know about the book without reading a single word of it.
111	33	"Karate Kids" "Karaté"	Clélia Constantine; Dominique Latil	Jean-Charles Finck	March 8, 2013
Manetti got his brown belt in Zonkarate, Coach Zonka's very own karate, for months already - but he just keep going on about it. Angelo and Sherwood can't wait to get their own brown belts - but, in order to do so, they must hack a wooden board in two with one hand - that's impossible. Unless they turn into Manetti, that is.
112	34	"Ice Cream Panic" "Sauvetage glacial"	Jean-Philippe Robin	Christian De Vita; Margaux Zinsner	March 15, 2013
Angelo's enjoying a cone of his favorite ice-cream at Adventure Park. But Dad criticizes the recipe, and the saleswoman hires him to rethink their whole range of flavors. She hands him a suitcase full of refrigerated samples along with a form to fill out. Angelo has got to get the suitcase away from Dad before he decides to remove the "Angelo Special" from the menu.
113	35	"Mini Grand Prix"	Matthieu Chevallier	Christian De Vita; Margaux Zinsner	March 22, 2013
Angelo and Sherwood have stranded their remote-controlled car in Geezer's garden. Their neighbor has no intention of returning the toy, although he already owns one of his own. In order to get it back, Angelo and Sherwood challenge Geezer to a race between their two cars. But Geezer's is much more powerful than theirs.
114	36	"The Case of Missing Controllers" "La mystérieuse affaire des manettes"	Andy Rheingold	Jean Duval	March 29, 2013
When Dad misplaces Angelo's prized video game controllers and then goes on a trip, Angelo rallies his friends, mom and Peter to find the controllers at all costs.
115	37	"Stealth Plan" "Echange pas standard"	Dominique Latil	Alexandre Hesse	April 5, 2013
Angelo has snatched back all the desserts Tracy had unfairly confiscated at the school cafeteria. But he's left incriminating evidence: a shoe print in a lasagna dish. Now he must make fake lasagna before his shoe-print lands him in detention. Better yet: fabricate a new shoe print pointing to a new culprit - like Tracy, for instance.
116	38	"Break a Leg" "Chevalier Manetti"	Serine Barbin; Story by : Clélia Constantine	Jean-Charles Finck	April 12, 2013
Eww. Angelo has been cast as Tracy's enamoured suitor for the school play - which he has to act in front of the whole class. gross. The only one who'll take his part is Manetti. But that means Angelo must turn Manetti into a brilliant actor before the show, and the big bully can't memorize over a word at a time.
117	39	"Buddy Guard" "Mon pire ami Manetti"	Nicolas Verpilleux	Solène Azernour	April 19, 2013
When Angelo accidentally saves Manetti's life, Manetti promises to be his body guard for him. But he soon takes things too far.
118	40	"Girl Pyjama Party" "Soirée entre filles"	Serine Barbin	Jean Duval	April 26, 2013
Lola's girl's night in is totally ruined by Tracy, who crashes the party and claims she can talk to spirits. This calls for one of Angelo's rescue strategies. But Tracy's being extra suspicious - the only way to kick her out is to make her believe the spirits do talk to her - and they're telling her to get out.
119	41	"Revolution" "Révolution"	Jean-Philippe Robin	Alexandre Hesse	May 31, 2013
Mr. Foot has put Tracy in charge of the school surveillance. The thing is, Tracy is Mr. Foot's niece, and she goes on a power trip, punishing kids under all kinds of ludicrous pretenses, making up new rules as she goes along. Angelo has had enough of her behavior: this calls for a revolution.
120	42	"Cosmic Pirates" "Action !"	Nicolas Verpilleux	Alban Rodriguez	June 14, 2013
Manetti lends his favorite movie, Cosmic Pirates 17, to Angelo and his buddies. The movie is totally lame. But things go awry when Angelo accidentally damages the precious DVD: the last five minutes are all scratched. Since they can't get another copy, Angelo and his friends decide to re-shoot the end of the movie.
121	43	"Battle For The Room" "La lutte des clubs"	Nicolas Verpilleux	Martial Harivel	May 24, 2013
Angelo, Sherwood and Lola have started an awesome rock band for the school party. To make sure they're ready, they decide to rehearse in the community center. But Geezer's hogging it with his stupid boards game society - it's only got one member: him. Angelo and his friends will do whatever it takes to kick him out and finally get a chance to rehearse.
122	44	"Foot By Foot" "Le trésor d'Alvina"	Nicolas Verpilleux	Solène Azernour	May 3, 2013
Angelo finds a box full of Elena's old tests and realizes Mr Foot has been giving the same ones for years. Which means Elena holds all the answers. What a windfall. Elena agrees to share her precious papers with Angelo so he won't have to study for tests again - on one condition: he must do her all sorts of favors.
123	45	"Air Guitar Hero" "Le concours d'air guitar"	Matthieu Chevallier	Alexandre Hesse	May 10, 2013
Slobber is holding an air guitar battle whose winner will feature in their next video clip. Angelo is determined to win. But Ethan, the online air-guitar champion, is competing, too, dashing every other contestant's hopes of winning. Angelo teams up with Lola and Sherwood and work on a killer routine. Then Lola gets stage fright.
124	46	"The Ultimate Locker" "Le casier secret"	Jean-Philippe Robin	Martial Harivel	June 28, 2013
Angelo secretly transforms his locker into the coolest hangout in school, until jealous Tracy tries to shut it down.
125	47	"Bed Race" "La grande course de lits"	Benjamin Richard; Thérésia Rippel	Jean Duval; Stéphane Mit	June 7, 2013
Everyone is taking part in the town's big bed race. And, this year, Angelo is bent upon winning - Tracy cheated her way to the trophy last year and there's no way that's happening again. Angelo's got an aerodynamic bed, a super-trained bed-pusher, he's got intel on his competition and a secret ally on the course - This year, anything goes. Note: This is a 30-minute special.
126	48	"Brainscramble" "Décervèlator"	Andy Rheingold	Christian De Vita; Alban Rodriguez	April 26, 2013
Angelo and friends throw a big party to celebrate the end of school at Adventureparkland and ride the brand new Brainscrambler roller coaster dozens of times which causes them to lose their memory of the party. The three spend the rest of the day trying to desperately figure out why Sherwood has a beard, who Lola kissed, and where Angelo's dad's video camera went. Note: This is a 30-minute special.
127	49	"The Candy Vault" "Opération bonbons"	Rick Groel	Christian De Vita; Jean Duval; Margaux Zinsner	June 21, 2013
When Angelo finds out about a giant candy vault located under the school that holds every piece of candy that has ever been confiscated, he and the gang set out to pull off the greatest candy heist of all time and take back what's theirs. Note: This is a 30-minute special.

=== Season 3 (2015–16) ===
All Season 3 episodes were directed by Max Maleo.

No. overall	No. in season	Title	Written by	Storyboard by	Original release date
128	1	"Space Cadet" "Victor, apprenti astronaute"	Amy Jackson; Andy Rheingold	Romain Sordet	2016
Angelo and Lola help Sherwood get into Space Camp by making an elaborate video of Sherwood as an astronaut with the Right Stuff.
129	2	"The Cheating Kind" "La reine des tricheuses"	Rick Groel; Amy Jackson	Alice Bissonnet	2016
Angelo tries a variety of strategies in an effort to cure Tracy of her obsession with cheating on anything, anywhere, anytime.
130	3	"Mudman" "Opération dodo"	Greg Grabianski; Amy Jackson	Solène Azernour	2016
Angelo makes the mistake of showing Peter a horror movie, and now Peter can't sleep so Angelo can't sleep until Peter can sleep.
131	4	"Back to School" "La revanche de Gilbert"	Rick Groel; Amy Jackson	Solène Azernour	2016
Angelo wants to make Geezer happy again by enrolling him in school - before discovering that some people aren't exactly made for school.
132	5	"Worlds Records" "Le grand livre des records"	Andy Rheingold; Amy Jackson	Solène Azernour	2016
When Angelo finds out his archnemesis Tracy is featured in the "World's Book of World Records", he vows to get his name in there too.
133	6	"Out-Lunch" "Déjeuner en ville"	Andy Rheingold; Amy Jackson	Alice Bissonnet	2016
Angelo, Sherwood and Lola sneak out of school to Cupcake Cathy's to get an out lunch. Unfortunately for them, Tracy rats them out.
134	7	"Tracy-Sitting" "Gladys la baby-sitter"	Andy Rheingold; Amy Jackson	Romain Sordet	2016
Mom has found a new babysitter for Peter, Tracy of all people. It's up to Angelo to protect his home at all costs!
135	8	"Zonked Out" "Zonka hors-jeu"	Jeffrey Kearney	Alexandre Ulmann	2016
When Coach Zonka decides to quit the soccer team a week before the championship, assistant coach Angelo has to find out what is behind this decision and convince him to come back.
136	9	"Prime Time" "Edition Spéciale"	Anastasia Heinzl; Thérésia Rippel	Alice Bissonnet	2016
Angelo and Tracy - who both want to host the school's video diary - each make a sensational video to impress the jury.
137	10	"Brownie Points" "Le chouchou du prof"	Christopher Panzner	Christophe Yoshida	2016
Angelo has finally fallen out of favor with Mr. Foot. In order to avoid summer school, he does everything he can to score points with him. But not by learning, of course, by mercilessly sucking up to him.
138	11	"Mind Reader" "Télépathie"	Fabrice Ziolkowski	Solène Azernour	2016
Angelo shares his tips for not having to revise. The centerpiece of his plan? Wasting his time building a helmet that will seemingly allow him to read minds.
139	12	"Double Agent" "Agent double"	Christopher Panzner	Riccardo Audisio	2016
Angelo, Sherwood and Lola build a drone for the science contest - and so does Tracy, whose drone is much more advanced than theirs! Lola must befriend Tracy in order to spy on her and thus sabotage her hopes of winning the contest.
140	13	"Surprise Package" "Le super cadeau surprise"	Rick Groel; Amy Jackson	Solène Azernour	2016
When Angelo accidentally swaps Elena's diary with the present she wants to give her boyfriend Hunter, he must rush to switch the packages before Hunter reads the diary and Elena's life is ruined.
141	14	"April Fools" "Que la farce soit avec toi"	Christopher Panzner	Yvan Roche	2016
For April Fool's Day, Angelo is planning the greatest prank in history. However, someone seems determined to do better than him.
142	15	"Get Well Soon" "Parents mode d'emploi"	Christopher Panzner	Lucie Gardes	2016
When Angelo's parents come down with the flu, he is made the temporary head of the household.
143	16	"Slobber School" "Du rock à l'école !"	Christopher Panzner	Christophe Yoshida	2016
Slobber is giving a private concert to the school whose students are most enthusiastic, and Angelo swears to make his school win.
144	17	"Night at the Department Store" "Une nuit au grand magasin"	Christopher Panzner	Christophe Yoshida	2016
Angelo, Elena and Dad get locked in the department store overnight.
145	18	"Fish Nappers" "Capitaine aventure"	Thérésia Rippel; Anastasia Heinzl	Christophe Yoshida	2016
When Peter and Cooper innocently steal Adventure Parkland's fish mascot, Angelo and friends must return it before the kidnappers are identified.
146	19	"Thanksgifting" "Un cadeau de trop"	Dominique Latil	Alice Bissonnet	2016
On Thanksgifting, each student has to give a gift to someone else, and Angelo and Tracy remove each other's names from the anonymous gift list.
147	20	"Another Side of Slobber" "Répétition secrète"	Dominique Latil	Christophe Yoshida	2016
Angelo and his friends try to break into Adventure Parkland to watch Slobber's secret rehearsal and discover their latest unreleased song.
148	21	"When Mom's Away" "Tel père tel fils"	Benjamin Richard; Nicolas Digard	Alice Bissonnet	2016
When Mom asks Dad to do some DIY around the house, Angelo must prevent his clumsy father from getting hurt.
149	22	"Book of Tracy" "Le Livre de Gladys"	Dominique Latil	Gaspard Sumeire	2016
Tracy steals Angelo's book of plans, so Angelo must retrieve it before Tracy reads it!
150	23	"Road Trip" "En voiture !"	Greg Grabianski; Amy Jackson	Riccardo Audisio	2016
Angelo does everything he can to make the two hour drive to the Dragons' game as enjoyable as the game itself.
151	24	"Angelo Time" "Mon moment préféré"	Jeffrey Kearney	Yvan Roche	2016
Angelo loses his sacred hour of being home alone after Elena quits her dance classes. He must find a way to get his space - and his sanity - back.
152	25	"Into the Wild" "Camping"	Benjamin Richard; Nicolas Digard	Lucie Gardes	2016
When Mom refuses to let Angelo, Peter and Dad go camping in the wild, they show her that they're capable by spending the night in the garden.
153	26	"The Longest 30 Seconds" "Les 30 secondes les plus longues"	Christopher Panzner	Yvan Roche	2016
When Angelo convinces Slobber to go back to their "garage band" roots, they decide to use his garage, and move in!
154	27	"Magic Show" "Angelo Magicien"	Christopher Panzner	Christophe Yoshida	2016
Angelo wants to perform a whole new magic trick at the talent show. He not only wants to win the competition, but also wants to be included in the great book of magicians.
155	28	"Yoga Mum" "Maman fait du Yoga"	Jeffrey Kearney	Lucie Gardes	2016
In order to get his mom to buy him the coolest skateboard in the world, Angelo must join her yoga classes.
156	29	"How Not to Be Angelo?" "Un plan à la Angelo"	Nicolas Digard; Benjamin Richard	Quentin Lebègue	2016
Tracy sets a trap for Angelo. Knowing him so well, she has planned all of the possible strategies he might use to wriggle out. Now Angelo has to think like the other students in order to develop a counter plan.
157	30	"His Thing" "La révélation de Bertrand-François"	Andy Rheingold; Amy Jackson; Story by : Jackson Rheingold	Gaspard Sumeire	2016
Butterfingers is so bad at everything that Angelo and friends take pity on him and help him find the area in which he can excel.
158	31	"Bachelor Angelo" "Vive l'indépendance !"	Thérésia Rippel; Anastasia Heinzl	Alice Bissonnet	2016
When Mom challenges Angelo to spend a week without her help at home, he tries to prove to her that he can lead a real single life.
159	32	"Dumb Luck" "Le coup de bol"	Christopher Panzner	Quentin Lebègue	2016
As dumb luck would have it, Angelo scores in the highest percentile on an IQ test! Einstein is rolling in his grave when Angelo is made "consulting principal" for a week.
160	33	"Bad Roommate" "Plus de colocataire !"	Anastasia Heinzl; Thérésia Rippel	Alice Bissonnet	2016
While Peter's room is being repainted, Angelo has to share his room with him. But neither is good at sharing...
161	34	"My Name in the Title" "Mon nom est dans le titre"	Benjamin Richard; Nicolas Digard	Christophe Yoshida	2016
Lola, Sherwood and Angelo are arguing about a very important question: if a movie were ever made about them, who would be the hero? And what part would the other two play?
162	35	"Go Green" "Vive l'écologie !"	Christopher Panzner	Christophe Yoshida	2016
When Miss Perla tells the class to create a work of art out of everyday objects at home, Angelo creates a giant sculpture from what he finds in his parents' car. That shouldn't be a problem, right?
163	36	"Remember Last Summer" "Souviens-toi l'été dernier"	Benjamin Richard; Nicolas Digard	Florent Lagrange	2016
Last year, Angelo missed out on a memorable day at the skate park with Ollie Van Dunk. This year, Ollie is doing it again - but only for kids who were there last year.
164	37	"Spot Remover" "Rêve de chien"	Christopher Panzner	Lucie Gardes	2016
When Angelo's parents stubbornly refuse to let him have a dog, he "adopts" an imaginary dog to prove to them that he is responsible.
165	38	"Rock or Rock" "Le rock dans la peau"	Thérésia Rippel; Anastasia Heinzl	Alice Bissonnet	2016
When Slobber's concert conflicts with Peter's school play, Angelo pulls out all the stops to skip the play.
166	39	"Best Seat Ever" "La meilleure des places"	Thérésia Rippel; Anastasia Heinzl	Florent Lagrange	2016
When Angelo loses his usual place at the back of the class, he finds himself sitting in front of Mr. Foot. Knowing this is the worst possible place to sit, Angelo hatches a plan to get his old seat back.
167	40	"Backseat Driver" "conduite accompagnée"	Alana Sanko; Amy Jackson	Christophe Yoshida	2016
Angelo and his dad work together to help Elena pass her driver's license. This should be a cakewalk.
168	41	"Soccermania" "La finale à tout prix !"	Rick Groel; Amy Jackson	Christophe Yoshida	2016
Angelo decides to raise money for his soccer team by creating a game that - thanks to a secret script - should provide plenty of entertainment.
169	42	"New Old Friends" "De vieux amis"	Andy Rheingold; Amy Jackson	Gaspard Sumeire	2016
When Angelo discovers that his dad and Mr. Foot were best friends when they were little, he tries to bring them together again, hoping it will make Mr. Foot a little nicer to him.
170	43	"Li'l Bear and Sweetness" "Petit ours et la sucette"	Andy Rheingold; Amy Jackson; Story by : Nate Rheingold	Florent Lagrange	2016
When Peter and Cooper's favorite TV show gets canceled, Angelo helps the little boys fill the void in their lives by letting them make their own TV series.
171	44	"Family Fun Time" "La famille s'amuse"	Rick Groel; Amy Jackson	Alice Bissonnet	2016
Angelo and his dad compete in a game show where they have to prove how well they know each other.
172	45	"Usually the Suspect" "Un suspect idéal"	Andy Rheingold; Amy Jackson	Christophe Yoshida	2016
Mr. Foot's car is on the roof of the school, but how did it get there? And more importantly, who was it? Angelo makes up an incredible story to explain how.
173	46	"Dark Angelo"	Benjamin Richard; Nicolas Digard	Alice Bissonnet	2016
In this crazy fantasy episode, Angelo dons the superhero costume and becomes "Dark Angelo"!
174	47	"The Skateboard Kid" "Le roi du skateboard"	Christopher Panzner	Gaspard Sumeire	2016
While playing a new skateboarding video game, Angelo unleashes the only skater in history to complete a 720° spin. Now he is determined to do the jump and win the skateboarding championship. Note: This is a 30-minute special.
175	48	"Peter Rules" "Le jour de Pierre"	Andy Rheingold; Amy Jackson	Solène Azernour; Quentin Lebègue	2016
Much to Angelo's dismay, Peter takes over the show and speaks to the camera as he guides viewers through the best day of his life! Note: This is a 30-minute special.
176	49	"The Big Heist" "Haut vol"	Rick Groel; Amy Jackson	Quentin Lebègue	2016
When the class test is stolen from Mr. Foot's desk, Angelo has exactly 24 hours to find the culprit or else he will be held responsible for the theft. Note: This is a 30-minute special.

=== Season 4 (2018) ===
All Season 4 episodes were directed by Thierry Marchand.

No. overall	No. in season	Title	Written by	Storyboard by	Original release date
177	1	"Dumb Phone" "Stupide téléphone"	Andy Rheingold; Amy Jackson	Alexandre Ulmann	February 17, 2018
Angelo really wants a smartphone, because everyone else at school seems to have one! Can he convince his parents to let him have one?
178	2	"The Note King" "Record à battre"	Andy Rheingold; Amy Jackson	Christian De Vita	February 17, 2018
Elena is the queen of note passing, but Angelo wants to break her record.
179	3	"Rock Star Dad" "Mon père ce rockeur"	Reid Harrison	Quentin Lebègue	February 18, 2018
Angelo helps make his dad's dream of becoming a rockstar come true.
180	4	"School Council" "Conseil d'école"	Anastasia Heinzl	Alban Rodriguez	February 18, 2018
Angelo wants to join the school council to find out what secrets they discuss. Can he get the teachers to trust him?
181	5	"Sleepover" "Pyjama partie"	Christopher Panzner	Karim El Mokaddem	February 20, 2018
Angelo pulls one too many pranks at a sleepover with his friends, until one goes horribly wrong.
182	6	"Fake Stuntman" "Mon papa cascadeur"	Christopher Panzner	Max Maleo	February 21, 2018
When Tracy starts boasting again, Angelo has to pretend that his dad is a real stuntman.
183	7	"The Balance of Nature" "L'équilibre de l'univers"	Reid Harrison	Max Maleo	February 22, 2018
When Angelo and Tracy suddenly become best pals, their friendship starts throwing off the balance of the universe.
184	8	"Cat Burglar" "Chat-pardeur"	Christopher Panzner	Sophia Chevrier	February 23, 2018
Angelo finds out that his cat has been stealing items from random people and storing them under his bed. Therefore, him and friends must return the items to where they came from.
185	9	"Here Comes the Science" "L'expérience interdite"	Christopher Panzner	Quentin Lebègue	February 24, 2018
When Angelo and Lola are stuck with Manetti as their science project partner, they decide to turn him into the project instead.
186	10	"The Arm" "Emplâtré"	Anastasia Heinzl	Florian Ponty	February 25, 2018
Tracy tries to blame Angelo for breaking her arm.
187	11	"Catnapped" "Chacun cherche son chat"	Jeffrey Kearney	Karim El Mokaddem	February 26, 2018
Angelo takes the wrong cat home from the vet's. Who has his cat?
188	12	"Pen Pal" "Le correspondant"	Jeffrey Kearney	Alexandre Ulmann	February 27, 2018
When Angelo is tasked with picking a pen pal from Europe, he decides to make one up instead.
189	13	"Employee of the Month" "Le stage de rêve"	Anastasia Heinzl; Thérésia Rippel	Karim El Mokaddem	February 28, 2018
Angelo really wants to get an intern job at Adventure Parkland. After all, what could be better than working at an amusement park in the summer?
190	14	"Bobbleheads are Gonna Roll" "Drôles de têtes"	Christopher Panzner	Quentin Lebègue	March 1, 2018
Miss Perla oversees detention and challenges Angelo and Manetti to get creative with the school's new 3D printer. When Angelo starts using the printer to make bobbleheads, everyone at school wants one of themselves.
191	15	"Secret Recipe" "La recette secrète"	Rick Groel; Amy Jackson	Florian Ponty	March 2, 2018
Cathy makes amazing cupcakes, but Angelo, Lola and Sherwood want her recipe. How can they get their hands on it?
192	16	"Angelo vs. The Test" "Angelo vs. L'interro"	Anastasia Heinzl; Bruno Ore	Sophia Chevrier	March 3, 2018
Just before Easter break, Angelo causes such a commotion that the entire classroom goes berserk so Mr. Foot schedules a test as punishment.
193	17	"What Now?" "Et Maintenant ?"	Reid Harrison	Karim El Mokaddem	March 4, 2018
When Angelo sees an ad for new roller skates on TV, he really wants them. As soon as Angelo eventually becomes the proud owner of these skates, his happiness is lost. He can no longer be enthusiastic about anything or anyone. Is there a curse on him?
194	18	"Grounded" "Privés de sortie"	Christopher Panzner	Quentin Lebègue	March 5, 2018
Angelo and Elena fight so hard over who should babysit Peter on Friday that they both end up being grounded until the two learn to cooperate and come to an agreement.
195	19	"The Pigeons" "Les Pigeons"	Anastasia Heinzl; Bruno Ore	Sophia Chevrier	March 6, 2018
Lola nests with Angelo because her house is said to be besieged by pigeons, which she is scared of. Angelo is annoyed by his permanent guest so there is only one solution: help Lola get over her fear.
196	20	"Cupcake War" "La guerre des cupcakes"	Jeffrey Kearney	Karim El Mokaddem	March 7, 2018
A new cupcake chain opens up downtown and threatens to put Cupcake Cathy out of business.
197	21	"Best Sister Ever" "La meilleure sœur"	Dominique Latil	Karim El Mokaddem	March 8, 2018
The two Slobber brothers start a competition: Whoever submits the best video about themselves and their big sister wins four backstage passes for the next Slobber concert. Is Angelo capable of getting a good video with him and Elena?
198	22	"Snow and Tell" "L'exposé"	Christopher Panzner	Quentin Lebègue	March 9, 2018
The summer "show and tell" project is just around the corner and Angelo comes up with the brilliant idea of bringing a snowball to school.
199	23	"Photobomb" "Photobombe"	Thérésia Rippel; Fanny Meeschaert	Céline Pottier	March 10, 2018
Angelo has discovered a fun hobby for himself - skilfully throwing himself into the middle of other's photos. Angelo's photobombs are such a hit on the internet that he finds he has some serious competition.
200	24	"Not Gym Class" "Sport annulé"	Christopher Panzner	Sophia Chevrier	March 11, 2018
Mr. Foot decides to cancel gym class until further notice due to budget cuts in order not to invest money in the urgently needed renovation of the sports field and the purchase of new sports equipment. Instead, there should be more math lessons!
201	25	"Van Dunk's Mojo" "Van Dunk et son mojo"	Anastasia Heinzl	Quentin Lebègue	July 20, 2018
Ollie Van Dunk has to defend his skateboard championship title, but when he falls and is disqualified, he gives up skateboarding. Angelo is determined to get Ollie back on the board.
202	26	"The Fence" "La palissade"	Rick Groel; Amy Jackson	Sophia Chevrier	August 6, 2018
Angelo wants to go to the swimming pool with his friends, but Geezer makes him paint his fence. Can Angelo organize enough people to do the job so he doesn't have to?
203	27	"The World According to Angelo" "Le monde selon Angelo"	Christopher Panzner Base on a Story by: Benjamin Richard; Clélia Constantine	Céline Pottier	August 6, 2018
Mr. Foot invites a TV producer into the class to work with the kids in teams of three to produce a series, so Angelo, Sherwood and Lola decide to produce their own show.
204	28	"In the Game" "Le professionnel"	Anastasia Heinzl; Bruno Ore	Quentin Lebègue	August 7, 2018
Angelo's mom installs a device on his computer that blocks all video games from playing for longer than 15 minutes each day. How will Angelo ever become a successful pro gamer?
205	29	"Geezer's Nephew" "Le neveu de Gilbert"	Jeffrey Kearney	Karim El Mokaddem	August 7, 2018
Geezer asks Angelo and his friends to take care of his nephew Donald in return for the drone Angelo flew into his garden by mistake. Donald seems okay at first, but before long he gets everyone into big trouble.
206	30	"Enter the Karate Kid" "Karaté Kid"	Andy Rheingold; Amy Jackson	Christophe Yoshida	August 8, 2018
To help Butterfingers gain more self-confidence, Angelo, Lola and Sherwood decide to teach him karate.
207	31	"A Perfect Day" "Ma journée idéale"	Christopher Panzner	Céline Pottier	August 8, 2018
Angelo does favors for all his friends, sealing every deal with the famous "pinky shake", and now he wants to redeem all these favors on the same day: the perfect day!
208	32	"Home Security" "Sécurité maximale"	Anastasia Heinzl	Sophia Chevrier	September 8, 2018
Angelo fears a thief might steal his game console while he's on vacation with his family, so he secures the house thoroughly. But when he returns from vacation nobody can enter the house. It gets worse - Angelo has hidden and secured his game console so well that he has to find it himself first and overcome the traps.
209	33	"Pow!"	Andy Rheingold; Amy Jackson Based on a Story by: Nate Rheingold	Céline Pottier	September 8, 2018
Angelo and his friends attend a comic convention, where they come up with the idea of becoming rich and famous with their own comic. Luckily, Peter & Cooper have developed a creative comic called "The TP Team". Angelo, Lola and Sherwood quickly start marketing.
210	34	"Better Call Angelo" "Allô Angelo"	Anastasia Heinzl	Sophia Chevrier	August 10, 2018
A rating portal gives each five-star rated service provider a meal prepared by Chef Misaki. Angelo has always wanted to eat this, so he offers free services to get reviews. Work is going well until he unexpectedly gets competition from Tracy.
211	35	"Electra"	Rick Groel; Amy Jackson	Alice Bissonnet	August 10, 2018
Angelo's dad has a surprise - Electra, a smart home device that can do just about anything. Everyone is enthusiastic at first, but it doesn't take long for Dad to become obsessed with Electra and start spending more time with "her" than with the family. Elena and Angelo must wean Electra off their father.
212	36	"Best Friends Forever" "Amis pour la vie"	Greg Grabianski; Amy Jackson	Quentin Lebègue	August 13, 2018
Although Angelo and Sherwood are already best friends, they take a friendship test online and the results are devastating. Now Angelo must convince Sherwood that they are still best friends after all.
213	37	"Cook Off" "Top tarte"	Andy Rheingold; Amy Jackson Base on a Story by: Jackson Rheingold	Alice Bissonnet	August 13, 2018
Angelo enters the town baking competition, but when he finds that Becky is also involved, he asks his dad for help. When Angelo and Dad can't agree on what to bake, he decides to enter the competition alone.
214	38	"Most Likely to Succeed" "Qui sera le favori ?"	Andy Rheingold; Amy Jackson	Alban Rodriguez	August 14, 2018
The best lists are selected for the yearbook. There are many categories to choose from, but Sherwood is the only choice for Best Chance of Success. Unfortunately, Tracy is very ambitious and ready to boot out Sherwood.
215	39	"Parent of the Year" "Parent de l'année"	Andy Rheingold; Amy Jackson	Quentin Lebègue	August 14, 2018
Angelo finds out that his dad has been taking parenting lessons, so he decides to sneak along and see what it's like.
216	40	"Snake Pit" "La fosse aux serpents"	Alana Sanko; Amy Jackson	Sophia Chevrier	August 15, 2018
Angelo is a big fan of the reality show "Snake Pit" - in which candidates try to get a jury enthusiastic about their business idea - and Angelo has an ingenious idea that might actually get him on the show: sibling rental.
217	41	"Professor Angelo" "Professeur Angelo"	Anastasia Heinzl	Alban Rodriguez	August 15, 2018
Angelo is sick of Mr. Foot calling his students "lazy" so Foot suggests they swap places for a day and see who throws in the towel first.
218	42	"The Future of Us" "Notre avenir"	Christopher Panzner	Frank Tizzoni; Alban Rodriguez	August 16, 2018
Angelo and friends take an internet career test - Angelo finds out he is a chef, Lola is an artist and Sherwood is a rock star. Unfortunately, this isn't exactly what they had in mind for their future, so they must fulfill their destiny as quickly as possible!
219	43	"Fake News" "Fausse rumeur"	Rick Groel; Amy Jackson	Céline Pottier	August 16, 2018
There is a new ride at Adventure Parkland that Angelo and his friends really want to ride. But the queue is incredibly long, so Angelo decides to invent a story about wolves being loose in the park. Unfortunately, this message takes on a life of its own and mass insecurity quickly spreads.
220	44	"The Replacements" "Les remplaçants"	Andy Rheingold; Jackson Rheingold; Amy Jackson	Céline Pottier	August 17, 2018
While Lola and Sherwood are on vacation, Angelo decides to look for other people to replace them until they return.
221	45	"Monster at the Door" "Le monstre derrière la porte"	Rick Groel; Amy Jackson	Karim El Mokaddem	August 17, 2018
When Angelo, Sherwood and Lola accidentally vandalize the sets for Damien Burst's new play at school, they are forced to take part as punishment whether they like it or not. So Angelo does his best to somehow "spice up" Burst's play.
222	46	"Videogame Style" "En mode jeu vidéo"	Andy Rheingold; Amy Jackson	Céline pottier Alban Rodriguez	August 20, 2018
Angelo, Sherwood and Ethan want to compete in a video game championship. Unfortunately, when a window accidentally breaks at the community center, they agree to a momentous deal with Schmitty to do jobs for him, "video game style".
223	47	"Peter for President" "Pierre président"	Rick Groel; Amy Jackson	Max Maleo	March 12, 2018
School elections are coming up soon, and Angelo fears that Tracy will be elected despite her outrageous behavior. There's only one thing left to do: call in Peter! Note: This is a 30-minute special.
224	48	"Dark Angelo 2: Wiznimals War" "Dark Angelo 2: La guerre Wiznimal"	Christopher Panzner	Karim El Mokaddem	August 21, 2018
Note: This is a 30-minute special.
225	49	"Deep Undercover" "L'infiltré"	Amy Jackson; Andy Rheingold	Alice Bissonnet; Quentin Lebègue	August 22, 2018
Angelo is at risk of switching schools if he doesn't stop breaking the rules and getting bad grades. Note: This is a 30-minute special.

=== Christmas Special (2021) ===
No.	Title	Directed by	Written by	Storyboard by	Original release date (France)
1	"Angelo, Wake Up! It's Christmas!" "Angelo Réveille-toi! C'est Noël!"	Max Maleo	Amy Jackson; Andy Rheingold; Rick Groel	Max Maleo; Solène Azernour	December 13, 2021
Angelo is waiting for Christmas, until he realises he is in a time loop due to being put on Santa's naughty list. He tries to combat this by trying to do good deeds alongside Sherwood and Lola. Note: This is an hour-long special.

=== Season 5 (2022) ===
All Season 5 episodes were directed by Max Maleo and Kévin Marry.

No. overall	No. in season	Title	Written by	Storyboard by	Original release date
226	1	"Remote Learning" "École à domicile"	Andy Rheingold	Céline Pottier	2022
227	2	"The Binge" "Aventures en série"	Rick Groel	Céline Pottier	2022
228	3	"Free Geezer" "Justice pour Gilbert"	Rick Groel	Laurent Salou	2022
229	4	"The Coaches" "Les coachs"	Christopher Panzner	Kathleen Ponsard	2022
230	5	"In the Zone" "Dans la zone"	Christopher Panzner	Fabien Brandly	TBA
231	6	"The Mysterious Journal" "Le mystérieux journal"	Jeffrey Kearney	Héléna Chelouah	TBA
232	7	"The Job Hunter" "Testeur d'éxpériences"	Jeffrey Kearney	Jérémie Bouet	TBA
233	8	"Adventures in Gigi-Sitting" "Soirée baby-sitting"	Christopher Panzner	Kathleen Ponsard	TBA
234	9	"The Fixer" "Directeur Gilbert"	Jeffrey Kearney	Yunaë Tiouka	TBA
235	10	"The Case of the Missing Bike" "L'affaire du vélo disparu"	Christopher Panzner	Céline Pottier	TBA
236	11	"Buster of Myth" "Casseurs de superstitions"	TBA	TBA	TBA
237	12	"Iron Kid" "Les tri-athlètes"	Christopher Panzner	Héléna Chelouah	TBA
238	13	"The Accidental Poet" "Poète par accident"	Jeffrey Kearney	Céline Pottier	TBA
239	14	"Parkour Pop" "L'as du parkour"	Greg Grabianski	Kathleen Ponsard	TBA
240	15	"Game Over"	Jeffrey Kearney	Céline Pottier	TBA
241	16	"Stress Ball" "Les balles anti stress"	Andy Rheingold	Yunaë Tiouka	TBA
242	17	"A Line in the Sand" "Compétition à la plage"	Christopher Panzner	Jérémie Bouet	TBA
243	18	"Faux Gelo" "Double Gelo"	Reid Harrison	Kathleen Ponsard	TBA
244	19	"Plan D"	Christopher Panzner	Jérémie Bouet	TBA
245	20	"He's Gotta Have it" "Il lui faut !"	Reid Harrison	Kathleen Ponsard	TBA
246	21	"Legendary Skate Spot" "Le skatepark de légende"	Nate Rheingold; Andy Rheingold	Céline Pottier	TBA
247	22	"The Cuddle Farm Incident" "La photo de la honte"	Anastasia Heinzl	Yunaë Tiouka	TBA
248	23	"Express Delivery" "Livraison express"	Anastasia Heinzl	Caroline Rondeau	TBA
249	24	"It Isn't Me" "C'est pas moi !"	Jeffrey Kearney	Matthieu Robert	TBA
250	25	"Extreme Animal Transport Squad" "Livraison express d'animal"	Anastasia Heinzl	Youssouf El Atmioui	TBA
251	26	"Principal for a Day" "Proviseur d'un jour"	Rick Groel	Matthieu Robert	TBA
252	27	"The Mystery of Brainscrambler" "Les mystères du retourneur de cerveau"	Anastasia Heinzl; Kévin Marry	Caroline Rondeau	TBA
253	28	"Angelo Files" "Les dossiers d'Angelo"	Christopher Panzner	Jérémie Bouet	TBA
254	29	"Fool's Gold" "La ruée vers l'or"	Reid Harrison	Céline Pottier	TBA
255	30	"Forever Home" "Un foyer pour toujours"	Alana Sanko	Céline Pottier	TBA
256	31	"Coach Karaoke" "Coach karaoké"	Jeffrey Kearney	Matthieu Robert	TBA
257	32	"The Game" "La soirée match"	Rick Groel	Christophe Yoshida	TBA
258	33	"Drone Wars" "La guerre des drones"	Christopher Panzner	Youssouf El Atmioui	TBA
259	34	"Quizbowl" "Le grand quizz"	Jeffrey Kearney	Florian Guivarch	TBA
260	35	"Vacation Vibes" "Les vacances sans fin"	Jeffrey Kearney	Jérémie Bouet	TBA
261	36	"Obey" "Obéis"	Rick Groel	Youssouf El Atmioui	TBA
262	37	"Save the Planet" "Sauvons la planète"	Jeffrey Kearney	Christophe Yoshida	TBA
263	38	"Sour to the People" "La guerre des stands"	Reid Harrison	Florian Guivarch	TBA
264	39	"Get Up Punk" "Le roi du kung-fu"	Jeffrey Kearney	Jérémie Bouet	TBA
265	40	"Angelo vs. The City" "Angelo contre le conseil municipal"	Reid Harrison	Jérémie Bouet	TBA
266	41	"Waiting for Lasagnas" "En attendant les lasagnes"	Rick Groel	Youssouf El Atmioui	TBA
267	42	"Zayden Rules" "Jordan la débrouille"	Adam Rheingold; Jackson Rheingold	Matthieu Robert	TBA
268	43	"Last Weekitis" "La dernière semaine en follie"	Jeffrey Kearney	Florian Guivarch	TBA
269	44	"First Mission" "Mission garderie"	Rick Groel	Jérémie Bouet	TBA
270	45	"Dark Angelo 3: Dawn of Injustice" "Dark Angelo 3: l'aube de l'injustice"	Andy Rheingold	Florian Guivarch (Part 1); Céline Pottier (Part 2)	TBA
Note: This is a 30-minute special.

=== Season 6 (2026) ===
All Season 6 episodes were directed by Max Maleo and Kévin Marry. It has not yet been dubbed in English.

No. overall	No. in season	Title	Written by	Storyboard by	Original release date (France)	U.S. air date
271	1	"La journée blanche"	Andy Rheingold	Youssouf El Atmioui	2026	
272	2	"Lenremplaçant de coach Zonka"	Jeffrey Kearney	Youssouf El Atmioui	2026	
273	3	"Services à gogo"	TBD	TBA	2026	
274	4	"Le plat"	TBD	TBA	2026	
275	5	"The Mascot" "La mascotte"	TBD	TBA	2026	
276	6	"Le son du silence"	TBD	TBA	2026	
277	7	"Battlefort royal"	TBD	TBA	2026	
278	8	"La fête des mères"	Christopher Panzner	Virginie Eudeline	2026	
279	9	"Tsunami acide"	TBD	TBA	2026	
280	10	"The Rivals" "Les rivaux"	TBD	TBA	2026	
281	11	"L'affaire de la capsule temporelle"	Rick Groel; Andy Rheingold	Jérémie Bouet	2026	
282	12	"Cinq gamins en colère"	Andy Rheingold	Virginie Eudeline	2026	
283	13	"A capella les gars"	TBD	TBA	2026	
284	14	"Devine qui vient à l'école"	Christopher Panzner	Juliette Rebollo	2026	
285	15	"The Final Session" "La dernière session"	Nate Rheingold; Andy Rheingold	Virginie Eudeline	2026	
286	16	"Like Cats and Dogs" "Comme chiens et chats"	Max Maleo; Kévin Marry	Jérémie Bouet	2026	
287	17	"Karaté en follie"	Andy Rheingold	Youssouf El Atmioui	2026	
288	18	"Opération Cupidon"	TBD	TBA	2026	
289	19	"Jordan est génial"	Rick Groel	Jérémie Bouet	2026	
290	20	"Le kidnapping de Lapinou"	Rick Groel; Andy Rheingold	Juliette Rebollo	2026	
291	21	"Trop beau pour être vrai"	Anastasia Heinzl; Kévin Marry	Jérémie Bouet	2026	
292	22	"Jarvik"	Jeffrey Kearney	Virginie Eudeline	2026	
293	23	"Chat perdu"	Andy Rheingold	Youssouf El Atmioui	2026	
294	24	"Monsieur Dorfman arrive en ville"	Jeffrey Kearney	Juliette Rebollo	2026	
295	25	"Escape room"	TBD	TBA	2026	
296	26	"Fous de baskets"	TBD	TBA	2026	
297	27	"Monstres à la maison"	TBD	TBA	2026	
298	28	"L'école des monstres"	TBD	TBA	2026	
299	29	"Dark Angelo 4: Dans le multivers des multivers"	TBD	TBA	2026	
Note: This is 30-minute special.
300	30	"À la recherche des lasagnes"	TBD	TBA	2026	
301	31	"Bracelet connecté"	TBD	TBA	2026	
302	32	"Comment faire..."	TBD	TBA	2026	
303	33	"Mon cher Manetti"	TBD	TBA	2026	
304	34	"La malédiction de l'enfant du milieu"	TBD	TBA	2026	
305	35	"La guerre des robots"	TBD	TBA	2026	
306	36	"Artiste en herbe"	TBD	TBA	2026	
307	37	"L'effet Hillmeulfo"	TBD	TBA	2026	
308	38	"La table des enfants"	TBD	TBA	2026	
309	39	"Le pot à gros mots"	TBD	TBA	2026	
310	40	"La grande aventure de Nirvana"	TBD	TBA	2026	
311	41	"Oui Chef!"	TBD	TBA	2026	
312	42	"Le glaciologue"	TBD	TBA	2026	
313	43	"Bertrand-François la débrouille"	TBD	TBA	2026	
314	44	"Les figurants"	TBD	TBA	2026	
315	45	"La chasse d'eau nucléaire"	TBD	TBA	2026	
316	46	"La chute"	TBD	TBA	2026	
317	47	"La nuit de la pluie de météores"	TBD	TBA	2026	
318	48	"Le hoquet"	TBD	TBA	2026	
319	49	"Mémoire effacée"	TBD	TBA	2026	
320	50	"Service contre service"	TBD	TBA	2026	
321	51	"Le procès d'Angelo"	TBD	TBA	2026	

== Broadcast ==
Angelo Rules has aired on Cartoon Network in over 152 countries. In the United States, the series premiered on 1 January 2010, with season two debuting on 2 June 2014. In Ireland, an Irish dub of the show broadcasts on Cúla4. In Wales, a Welsh dub has aired on S4C.

== Reception ==
Angelo Rules was one of 24 nominees for the second International Emmy Kids Awards in 2013.
