= Hareport =

Children's television series

- Also known as: Tarmac Micmac; Hazentem Internationaal
- Created by: Jan Bultheel
- Directed by: Jan Bultheel; Fabrice Fouquet
- Voices of: Gary Mack; Eric Gutman; Mike Pollock; Rebecca Kupka; Kether Donohue; Rena Strober; Jennifer Hale
- Theme music composer: Vincent Boutolleau
- Opening theme: Hareport Theme
- Ending theme: Hareport Theme
- Composer: Vincent Boutolleau
- Countries of origin: France; Belgium
- Original languages: French; English
- No. of seasons: 1
- No. of episodes: 26

Production
- Executive producers: Corinne Kouper; Viviane Vanfleteren
- Producers: Corinne Kouper; Viviane Vanfleteren
- Running time: 13 minutes
- Production companies: Vivi Film; TeamTO; Filmwerken

Original release
- Network: TF1
- Release: January 2010 – June 2010

Related
- Chicken's life

Hareport is an animated television series produced by France's independent TeamTO, with the support of the Centre National de la Cinématographie and distributed by Cake Entertainment. The series was first proposed at 2006's Cartoon Forum. It is also made by Filmwerken and Vivi Film. The English dub was done by Big Yellow Duck.

The show's main characters are Ned and Fred, two hares who decide to build an international airport on their own garden after discovering that all animals can finally fly.

Hareport was selected for the 2010 International Chicago Children Film Festival.

== Characters ==
- Ned: Ned is the average lazy, partying and unmotivated brother of Fred. He runs the check-in counter but frequently takes breaks. Like Fred, they both share a love for Cookie. He also dozes off and likes to always have a fun time than work all the time. Voiced by Gary Mack.
- Fred: Fred is a tall, skinny and red furred hare. He's very responsible, and is the complete opposite of his brother Ned. Fred holds the management in the airport. He and Ned frequently get into quarrels but they always realize how much it brings them closer. Voiced by Eric Gutman.
- Cookie: Cookie is a female pink squirrel, and is charming as well as beautiful. She is the operator of the control tower and changes her voice to that of a mature woman over the voice box. Boris is also her adoptive brother. Cookie is the desire of Ned and Fred's romantic dreams. Voiced by Kether Donohue.
- Boris: Boris is a large, friendly bear and also the adoptive brother of Cookie (whom he is very protective of). He is the clerk of the souvenir shop which sells anything to do with the airport and its staff. Voiced by Mike Pollock.
- Moppet: Moppet is the youngest of the staff and is an intern of the airport. He is very quick and very responsible in order to prove he is the best worker of the entire staff. He being young and naive is often following Ned and Fred's orders (even if they are ridiculous). He works in various jobs of the airport, but is mostly seen as the handler of the traveler's suitcases. Voiced by Rebecca Kupka.
- Hughes: Hughes is an elder wolf and the oldest of the entire staff. Being old, he has bad eyesight and everything else that comes to being an old person. He runs the airport's lounge and serves various drinks to anyone who approaches the counter. He also gives advice to settle all the disputes that often come someone's way in which he unexpectedly walks into. Voiced by Gary Mack.
- Baboon: Baboon is the airport's mechanic, and he is often seen fixing anything that is broken. In addition, he also tries to upgrade things which usually turn out for better or worse, although they usually end up hurting someone. For a short time, he was the full owner of the airport. Voiced by Gary Mack.
- The Crow Sisters: The Crow Sisters are a trio of crows lining up in different sizes, they are never seen separated and are always found together, squashed in a tight bunch. They are the cleaners of the airport and will often clean the messes Ned & Fred make, in an unpleasant tone. Voiced by Kether Donohue and Rena Strober.
- The Beavers: The Beavers are a family of 5. The husband and father is always trying to shut down the airport because he can not stand the hares. He dislikes all the noise. The wife and mother goes along with her husband's plans or likes to hangout in the souvenir shop. They have three kids, one of which is skinny, another which looks average, and their youngest who is usually welcomed at the airport because he is usually the most innocent of the beaver family and is also a friend of Moppet. For a short time the youngest beaver child was an intern.
- The Travelers: The travelers are the blood of the airport system, and they all come in many shapes and kinds. They are usually seen around the airport as a background prop and often come and go on the runway of airstrip.

== International broadcasts ==
Country	Channel	Date of Premiere
Belgium	Ketnet	January 4, 2010
France	TF1	2010
New Zealand	Disney Channel (Australia)	2010
Australia	Disney Channel (Australia)	2010
Hungary	Minimax	2010
United Kingdom	POP	2011
Brazil	Gloob	2012
United States	Netflix	2013
Portugal	Canal Panda and RTP2	2014
Canada	Toon-A-Vision	2018
