= LUK Internacional =

Spanish distribution and licensing company

LUK Internacional S.A.
- Type: Private (Socio único)
- Industry: Licensing
- Founded: 1979
- Founder: Paco Gratacós; David Henden
- Headquarters: Barcelona, Catalonia, Spain
- Key people: Francisco Gratacós Matamala (CEO); Paco Gratacós (head of distribution)
- Services: Film distribution; International sales; Audiovisual distribution
- Owner: Gratacós family
- Website: Official website

LUK Internacional S.A. (known as Mediterráneo Films until 1983) is a Spanish distribution and licensing company. Founded in 1979 by Paco Gratacós, the company started in the theatrical sector (the Gratacós family was also involved in the beginning of theatrical screenings in Barcelona and Spain as a whole), before, in the late 1980s, it turned its attention to television, and subsequently distribution of animated series, where it found its niche.

== History ==
Mediterráneo Films was founded in March 1979 by Paco Gratacós and David Henden. The first film distributed by the firm was the Japanese title Message from Space which had American actors, but failed in the box office. This was followed by The Gendarme and the Extra-Terrestrials with renowned French comic actor Louis de Funès, which ended up becoming one of the ten most watched films in Spain in 1979. By 1983, the company adopted the dual name Mediterráneo Films - LUK Internacional before being simply renamed LUK Internacional. Initially, Gratacós continued the film distribution career, with The Skin, Young Doctors in Love, Blame It on Rio and To Be or Not to Be, a 1942 film that was projected at the Capsa cinema in Barcelona for twelve months and the Bellas Artes cinema in Madrid for eighteen months.

The difficulties it was facing in the theatrical circuits in the company's early years saw the company adopt a new strategy, leaving the big screen and skipping video, going straight to linear television. During the 1980s, the first autonomous television stations began appearing, first in the communities that had their own languages (Basque Country, Galicia, Catalonia) and later in three other important autonomous communities (Andalusia, Madrid, Valencia). The first contract for television was with Euskal Telebista, beginning in 1987, and was later spread to other television stations. For this end, he signed an agreement with Francis Ford Coppola's Zoetrope Studios to distribute theatrical movies to these stations. Such titles included Apocalypse Now One from the Heart and The Outsiders. Two years later, after an agreement with Lucasfilm, he obtained the rights to Tucker: The Man and His Dream and the original Star Wars trilogy, with which it had the rights for ten years.

Eventually, LUK Internacional eyed the acquisition of a package of TV movies from some 300 companies, but as demand fell, he moved to animation. His failure to acquire the rights to Denver, the Last Dinosaur led him to buy Teenage Mutant Ninja Turtles instead, becoming a success. Quickly, the company started bringing more titles, such as Garfield and Friends, The Adventures of Rocky and Bullwinkle and Friends and anime titles like Doraemon. On 23 April 2001, coinciding with the launch of K3, Shin-chan made its first airing.

Since 2015, Francesc Gratacós, son of Paco Gratacós and fourth generation of the family, started working at its commercial department, alongside his father, Miquel Gratacós. On 3 October 2018, it eyed an agreement with ABS-CBN to distribute its teleserye catalog to Spain and Portugal.
