= Canal+ Family =

French television channel

- Country: France
- Broadcast area: France; Switzerland
- Headquarters: Issy-les-Moulineaux

Programming
- Language: French
- Picture format: 576i (SDTV); 1080i (HDTV)

Ownership
- Owner: Groupe Canal+

History
- Launched: 20 October 2007; 18 years ago
- Closed: 30 August 2021; 5 years ago (Metropolitan France); 9 September 2021; 5 years ago (Overseas France)
- Replaced by: Canal+ Kids (French)

Canal+ Family was a French TV channel devoted to the broadcast of family programming. It was part of the "Les Chaînes Canal+" and the "Famille" package from Canal+. In 2021, the channel closed in Metropolitan France, to be replaced by Canal+ Kids and Canal+ Docs. Canal+ Family still has an active African version, on channel 6 from Canal+ Afrique.

== History ==
Canal+ Family was launched on 27 October 2007 as a complement to Canal+.

The channel began broadcasting in High Definition (HD) on 12 October 2010.

In October 2010, Canal+ SA applied to the CSA to obtain a frequency for the channel on the TNT but this application was rejected on 14 December in favor of the LFP string CFoot.

On 30 August 2021, Canal+ Family closed in Metropolitan France, to be replaced by Canal+ Kids and Canal+ Docs on 9 September, focusing on on-demand content. However, Canal+ Family continued to broadcast in Overseas France until 9 September when it was also replaced by Canal+ Kids.

As of 13 September 2024, Canal+ Family has been replaced by Canal+ 360 in Poland.

Canal+ Family still has an active African version, on channel 6 from Canal+ Afrique.

== Logo history ==
Canal+ Family does not put its logo on the screen while broadcasting its programs.

Canal+ Family second logo from 2009 to 2013.

Canal+ Family final logo from 2013 to 2021 and Africa version from 2013 to 2024.

== Distribution ==
Canal+ Family was available on satellite (Canalsat), cable (Numericable) and several broadcasters ADSL.
