= List of children's animated television series of the 2010s =

Sugar scull

This is a list of children's animated television series (including internet television series); that is, animated programs originally targeted towards audiences aged 12 and under in mind.

This list does not include Japanese, Chinese, or Korean series, as children's animation is much more common in these regions.

== 2010s ==
=== United States ===
Title	Genre	Seasons/episodes	Show creator(s)	Original release	Network	Studio	Age rating	Technique
Team Umizoomi	• Preschool • Adventure	4 seasons, 80 episodes	• Soo Kim • Michael T. Smith • Jennifer Twomey	January 25, 2010 – April 24, 2015	Nickelodeon	• Curious Pictures • Nickelodeon Animation Studio	TV-Y	CGI/Flash/Live-action
SciGirls	Educational entertainment	7 seasons, 46 episodes	Twin Cities PBS	February 11, 2010 – June 23, 2023	• PBS Kids Go! (2010–13) • PBS Kids (2013–23)	• Twin Cities PBS • Soup2Nuts	TV-G	Flash/Live-action
Kick Buttowski: Suburban Daredevil	• Action • Adventure • Comedy	2 seasons, 52 episodes	Sandro Corsaro	February 13, 2010 – December 2, 2012	Disney XD	Disney Television Animation	TV-Y7	Flash
Dance-A-Lot Robot		1 season, 10 episodes	Don Carter	February 27 – March 5, 2010	Playhouse Disney	Kickstart Productions	TV-Y	CGI/Live-action/Flash
Pink Panther and Pals	Comedy	1 season, 26 episodes	Friz Freleng	March 7 – August 23, 2010	Cartoon Network	• Desert Panther Production • Mirisch Company • MGM Television	TV-Y7	Traditional
Adventure Time	• Science fantasy • Adventure • Science fiction • Surreal comedy • Coming of age	10 seasons, 283 episodes	Pendleton Ward	April 5, 2010 – September 3, 2018	Cartoon Network	• Frederator Studios • Cartoon Network Studios	TV-PG	Traditional
Scooby-Doo! Mystery Incorporated	• Mystery • Comedy-drama	2 seasons, 52 episodes		April 5, 2010 – April 5, 2013	Cartoon Network	Warner Bros. Animation	TV-Y7	Traditional
Ben 10: Ultimate Alien	• Science fantasy • Action • Adventure • Superhero	3 seasons, 52 episodes	Man of Action Entertainment	April 23, 2010 – March 31, 2012	Cartoon Network	Cartoon Network Studios	TV-Y7	Traditional
Generator Rex	• Science fantasy • Action • Adventure • Superhero	3 seasons, 60 episodes	Man of Action Entertainment	April 23, 2010 – January 3, 2013	Cartoon Network	Cartoon Network Studios	TV-PG	Traditional
Fish Hooks	Comedy	3 seasons, 59 episodes	Noah Z. Jones	September 3, 2010 – April 4, 2014	Disney Channel	Disney Television Animation	TV-G	Flash
NFL Rush Zone	• Action • Adventure	3 seasons, 60 episodes	Rohitash Rao	September 6, 2010 – October 22, 2014	Nicktoons	• Curious Pictures (season 1) • Rollman Entertainment (seasons 2–3) • NFL Productions	TV-Y7	Traditional
Regular Show	• Animated sitcom • Adventure	8 seasons, 261 episodes	J. G. Quintel	September 6, 2010 – January 16, 2017	Cartoon Network	Cartoon Network Studios	TV-PG	Traditional
Mad	• Sketch comedy • Satire	4 seasons, 103 episodes		September 6, 2010 – December 2, 2013	Cartoon Network	Warner Bros. Animation	TV-PG	Traditional/CGI/Flash/Stop-motion/Live-action
Sym-Bionic Titan	• Science fantasy • Action • Adventure • Superhero	1 season, 20 episodes	• Genndy Tartakovsky • Bryan Andrews • Paul Rudish	September 17, 2010 – April 9, 2011	Cartoon Network	• The Orphanage • Cartoon Network Studios	TV-PG	Traditional
The Avengers: Earth's Mightiest Heroes	• Action • Adventure • Superhero • Science fantasy	2 seasons, 52 episodes	Sandro Corsaro	September 22, 2010 – November 11, 2012	Disney XD	• Film Roman • Ingenious Media • Marvel Animation	TV-Y7	Traditional
Planet Sheen	Comic science fiction	1 season, 26 episodes	• Keith Alcorn • Butch Hartman	October 2, 2010 – February 15, 2013	• Nickelodeon (2010–11) • Nicktoons (2012–13)	• Omation Animation Studio • Nickelodeon Animation Studio	TV-Y7	CGI
T.U.F.F. Puppy	• Action • Comedy • Slapstick • Spy-fi • Surreal humor • Science fiction	3 seasons, 60 episodes	Butch Hartman	October 2, 2010 – April 4, 2015	• Nickelodeon (2010–13) • Nicktoons (2013–15)	• Billionfold Inc. • Nickelodeon Animation Studio • Viacom Media Networks	TV-Y7	Traditional
Strawberry Shortcake's Berry Bitty Adventures	• Fantasy • Adventure • Musical • Comedy	4 seasons, 65 episodes		October 10, 2010 – September 12, 2015	The Hub / Discovery Family	• American Greetings	TV-Y	CGI
Maryoku Yummy	Fantasy	1 season, 26 episodes	Jeffrey Conrad	October 11, 2010 – November 15, 2010	The Hub	• American Greetings • DQ Entertainment • Telegael	TV-Y	Flash
Zevo-3	• Action • Adventure • Science fiction	1 season, 26 episodes	John Massé	October 11, 2010 – May 7, 2011	Nicktoons	• Mike Young Productions • MoonScoop Group • Skechers Entertainment	TV-Y7	Traditional
Robotomy	Comic science fiction	1 season, 10 episodes	• Michael Buckley • Joe Deasy	October 25, 2010 – January 24, 2011	Cartoon Network	• World Leaders Entertainment • Cartoon Network Studios	TV-PG	Traditional
G.I. Joe Renegades	• Action • Adventure	1 season, 26 episodes		November 26, 2010 – July 23, 2011	The Hub	• Darby Pop Productions • Hasbro Studios	TV-Y7	Traditional
Transformers: Prime	• Action • Adventure • Science fiction	3 seasons, 65 episodes		November 26, 2010 – July 26, 2013	The Hub / Hub Network	• Digitalscape • K/O Paper Products • Hasbro Studios • Polygon Pictures	TV-Y7	CGI
Young Justice	• Action • Adventure • Science fiction	4 seasons, 98 episodes		November 26, 2010 – June 9, 2022	• Cartoon Network (2010–2013) • DC Universe (2019) • HBO Max (2021–2022)	• Warner Bros. Animation • DC Entertainment	TV-PG	Traditional
Dan Vs.	Sitcom; Comedy	3 seasons, 53 episodes	• Dan Mandel • Chris Pearson	January 1, 2011 – March 9, 2013	The Hub	Film Roman; The Hatchery	TV-PG	Flash
Jake and the Never Land Pirates	• Adventure • Fantasy • Musical	4 seasons, 114 episodes	Bobs Gannaway	February 14, 2011 – November 6, 2016	Disney Junior	• Disney Television Animation • Mercury Filmworks (season 1–3) • Bardel Entertainment (season 4) • Toon City (season 4)	TV-Y	Flash
The Problem Solverz	• Comedy • Mystery	2 seasons, 26 episodes	Ben Jones	April 4, 2011 – March 30, 2013	• Cartoon Network (2011) • Netflix (2013)	• Mirari Films • Cartoon Network Studios	TV-PG	Flash
The Looney Tunes Show	Animated sitcom	2 seasons, 52 episodes	Sam Register	May 3, 2011 – August 31, 2014	Cartoon Network	Warner Bros. Animation	TV-PG	Traditional
ThunderCats (2011)	• Action • Adventure • Science fiction	1 season, 26 episodes		July 29, 2011 – June 16, 2012	Cartoon Network	Warner Bros. Animation	TV-PG	Traditional
Kung Fu Panda: Legends of Awesomeness	• Action/Adventure • Comedy	3 seasons, 80 episodes	Peter Hastings	September 19, 2011 – June 29, 2016	• Nickelodeon (2011–14) • Nicktoons (2016)	• DreamWorks Animation Television • Nickelodeon Animation Studio	TV-Y7	CGI
Secret Millionaires Club		1 season, 26 episodes	Andy Heyward	October 23, 2011 – January 11, 2017	The Hub / Hub Network	• Berkshire Hathaway • Bang Zoom! Entertainment • Xing Xing Animation	TV-Y7	Flash
DC Nation Shorts	• Action • Anthology • Comedy • Superhero	1 season, 159 episodes		November 11, 2011 – August 2, 2014	Cartoon Network	• Warner Bros. Animation • DC Entertainment	TV-PG	Flash
Green Lantern: The Animated Series	• Action • Adventure • Drama • Science fiction	1 season, 26 episodes		November 11, 2011 – March 16, 2013	Cartoon Network	• Warner Bros. Animation • DC Entertainment	TV-PG	CGI
Minnie's Bow-Toons	Comedy	9 seasons, 120 episodes	Bobs Gannaway	November 14, 2011 – present	Disney Junior	• Disney Television Animation • DQ Entertainment • Technicolor	TV-Y	CGI
The Aquabats! Super Show!	• Action-adventure • Comedy • Musical	2 seasons, 21 episodes	• Christian Jacobs • Jason deVilliers • Scott Schultz	March 3, 2012 – January 18, 2014	The Hub	The Magic Store Productions	TV-PG	Flash/Live-action
Ultimate Spider-Man	• Action • Comedy-drama • Superhero	4 seasons, 104 episodes	Marvel Animation	April 1, 2012 – January 7, 2017	Disney XD	• Film Roman • Marvel Animation	TV-Y7	Traditional
The Legend of Korra	• Action • Adventure • Science fantasy • Comedy-drama	4 seasons, 52 episodes	• Michael Dante DiMartino • Bryan Konietzko	April 14, 2012 – December 19, 2014	• Nickelodeon (2012–14) • Nick.com (2014)	• Ginormous Madman • Nickelodeon Animation Studio	TV-Y7	Traditional
Motorcity	• Action/adventure • Car racing • Science fantasy	1 season, 20 episodes	Chris Prynoski	April 30, 2012 – January 7, 2013	Disney XD	• Disney Television Animation • Titmouse, Inc.	TV-Y7	Flash
Kaijudo	• Action • Adventure	2 seasons, 52 episodes	Andy Heyward	May 5, 2012 – December 28, 2013	The Hub/Hub Network	• Hasbro Studios • Moi Animation	TV-Y7	Traditional
Tron: Uprising	• Action • Drama • Science fiction	1 season, 19 episodes	Edward Kitsis	May 18, 2012 – January 28, 2013	Disney XD	• Sean Bailey Productions • Disney Television Animation • Polygon Pictures	TV-Y7	CGI
Care Bears: Welcome to Care-a-Lot	• Adventure • Musical	1 season, 26 episodes	Andy Heyward	June 2, 2012 – December 28, 2013	The Hub	• MoonScoop Entertainment • American Greetings	TV-Y	CGI
Gravity Falls	• Comedy • Adventure • Mystery • Surreal comedy • Drama • Fantasy	2 seasons, 40 episodes	Alex Hirsch	June 15, 2012 – February 15, 2016	• Disney Channel (2012–14) • Disney XD (2014–16)	Disney Television Animation	TV-Y7	Traditional
Ben 10: Omniverse	• Science fantasy • Action • Adventure • Superhero	8 seasons, 80 episodes	Man of Action Entertainment	August 1, 2012 – November 14, 2014	Cartoon Network	Cartoon Network Studios	TV-Y7	Traditional
Robot and Monster	• Comedy • Adventure • Animation	1 season, 26 episodes	• Dave Pressler • Joshua Sternin • J.R. Ventimilia	August 4, 2012 – March 4, 2015	• Nickelodeon (2012) • Nicktoons (2013–2015) • Noggin (app, 2015)	• Smasho! Productions • Lowbar Productions • Nickelodeon Animation Studio	TV-Y7	CGI
DreamWorks Dragons	• Action • Adventure • Fantasy	8 seasons, 118 episodes		August 7, 2012 – February 16, 2018	• Cartoon Network (2012–14) • Netflix (2015–18)	DreamWorks Animation Television	TV-PG	CGI
Teenage Mutant Ninja Turtles (2012)	• Action • Adventure • Science fantasy	5 seasons, 124 episodes		September 29, 2012 – November 12, 2017	• Nickelodeon • Nicktoons (episodes 115–121)	Nickelodeon Animation Studio	TV-Y7	CGI
Sofia the First	• Fantasy • Adventure • Musical • Comedy	4 seasons, 109 episodes	Craig Gerber	• Pilot: November 18, 2012 • Original series: January 11, 2013 – September 8, 2018	• Disney Junior • Disney Channel	Disney Television Animation	TV-Y	CGI
Monsters vs. Aliens	Comic science fiction	1 season, 26 episodes	• Mark McCorkle • Bob Schooley	March 23, 2013 – February 8, 2014	Nickelodeon	• DreamWorks Animation Television • Nickelodeon Animation Studio	TV-Y7	CGI
Lalaloopsy	Fantasy	2 seasons, 52 episodes	MGA Entertainment	March 29, 2013 – September 14, 2015	Nick Jr. Channel	• MGA Entertainment • MoonScoop Entertainment	TV-Y	Flash
Teen Titans Go!	• Action • Adventure • Comedy	9 seasons, 440 episodes	• Aaron Horvath • Michael Jelenic	April 23, 2013 – present	Cartoon Network	• Warner Bros. Animation • DC Comics	TV-PG	Flash
Sanjay and Craig	• Comedy • Animation • Slapstick	3 seasons, 60 episodes	• Jim Dirschberger • Jay Howell • Andreas Trolf	May 25, 2013 – July 29, 2016	Nickelodeon	• Forest City Rockers • Nickelodeon Animation Studio	TV-Y7	Traditional
Avengers Assemble	• Action • Adventure • Superhero	5 seasons, 126 episodes	• Marvel Animation • Man of Action	May 26, 2013 – February 24, 2019	Disney XD	Marvel Animation	TV-Y7	Traditional
Mickey Mouse	Comedy	5 seasons, 94 episodes	Paul Rudish	June 28, 2013 – July 20, 2019	Disney Channel	Disney Television Animation	TV-G	Flash/Toon Boom
Beware the Batman	• Action • Adventure • Science fiction	1 season, 26 episodes	• Glen Murakami • Sam Register • Mitch Watson • Butch Lukic	July 13, 2013 – September 28, 2014	• Cartoon Network (2013) • Adult Swim (2014)	• Warner Bros. Animation • DC Entertainment	TV-PG	CGI
Hulk and the Agents of S.M.A.S.H.	• Superhero • Comedy	2 seasons, 52 episodes	• Paul Dini • Henry Gilroy • Marvel Animation	August 11, 2013 – June 28, 2015	Disney XD	• Film Roman • Marvel Animation	TV-Y7	Traditional
Wander Over Yonder	Comic science fiction	2 seasons, 43 episodes	Craig McCracken	August 16, 2013 – June 27, 2016	• Disney Channel (2013–14) • Disney XD (2014–16)	Disney Television Animation	TV-Y7	Flash/Toon Boom
Uncle Grandpa	• Fantasy • Comedy • Surreal humor	5 seasons, 153 episodes	Peter Browngardt	September 2, 2013 – June 30, 2017	Cartoon Network	Cartoon Network Studios	TV-PG	Traditional
Steven Universe	• Action • Science fantasy • Comedy-drama • Coming of age	5 seasons, 160 episodes	Rebecca Sugar	November 4, 2013 – January 21, 2019	Cartoon Network	Cartoon Network Studios	TV-PG	Traditional
Sheriff Callie's Wild West	• Comedy • Western	2 seasons, 45 episodes	• George Evelyn • Denis Morella	December 13, 2013 – February 13, 2017	Disney Junior	• WildBrain Entertainment (season 1) • Wild Canary Animation (season 2)	TV-Y	CGI
Turbo Fast	• Adventure • Comedy • Racing	3 seasons, 52 episodes	David Soren	December 24, 2013 – February 5, 2016	Netflix	• Titmouse, Inc. • DreamWorks Animation Television	TV-Y7	Flash
Wallykazam!	• Preschool • Fantasy • Musical	2 seasons, 52 episodes	Adam Peltzman	February 3, 2014 – September 9, 2017	• Nickelodeon • Nick Jr. Channel	Nickelodeon Animation Studio	TV-Y	CGI
Breadwinners	Comedy	2 seasons, 40 episodes	• Steve Borst • Gary "Doodles" DiRaffaele	February 17, 2014 – September 12, 2016	• Nickelodeon (2014–2015) • Nicktoons (2016)	• Titmouse, Inc. (animation) • Nickelodeon Animation Studio	TV-Y7	Flash/Traditional
The Tom and Jerry Show	Comedy	5 seasons, 118 episodes		April 9, 2014 – February 15, 2021	• Cartoon Network (season 1) • Boomerang (seasons 2–5)	Warner Bros. Animation	TV-PG	Flash
Clarence	Comedy	3 seasons, 130 episodes	Skyler Page	April 14, 2014 – June 24, 2018	Cartoon Network	Cartoon Network Studios	TV-PG	Traditional
Space Racers	Science fiction	2 seasons, 40 episodes	• Richard Schweiger • Julian Cohen	May 2, 2014 – November 22, 2018	• PBS Kids (2014) • Sprout/Universal Kids (2016–2018)	• Space Race, LLC • Maryland Public Television (season 1) • WNET (season 2)	TV-Y	CGI
Tumble Leaf	• Adventure • Fantasy	4 seasons, 52 episodes	Drew Hodges	May 23, 2014 – February 25, 2019	Amazon Video	• Amazon Studios • Bix Pix Entertainment	TV-Y	Stop-motion
The 7D	• Adventure • Comedy • Fantasy	2 seasons, 44 episodes		July 7, 2014 – November 5, 2016	Disney XD	Disney Television Animation	TV-Y7	Traditional
Astroblast!	• Educational • Comedy • Science fiction	2 seasons, 52 episodes	Bob Kolar	July 12, 2014 – February 7, 2015	Sprout	• Scholastic • Soup2Nuts	TV-Y	Flash
Dora and Friends: Into the City!	• Preschool • Adventure • Musical	2 seasons, 41 episodes	Chris Gifford	August 18, 2014 – February 5, 2017	• Nickelodeon • Nick Jr. Channel	Nickelodeon Animation Studio	TV-Y	Traditional
Star Wars Rebels	• Action • Adventure • Science fiction	4 seasons, 75 episodes	• Simon Kinberg • Dave Filoni • Carrie Beck	October 3, 2014 – March 5, 2018	Disney XD	• Lucasfilm • Lucasfilm Animation	TV-Y7	CGI
Over the Garden Wall	Miniseries	1 season, 10 episodes	Patrick McHale	November 3–7, 2014	Cartoon Network	Cartoon Network Studios	TV-PG	Traditional
VeggieTales in the House	• Comedy • Christian	4 seasons, 52 episodes	Doug TenNapel	November 26, 2014 – September 23, 2016	Netflix	• DreamWorks Animation Television • Big Idea Entertainment	TV-Y	CGI
Polo	Educational	2 seasons, 35 episodes	Regis Faller	December 1, 2014 – present	Piwi+	• Fabrique D'Images •Bayard Animation	TV-Y7	Flash
Penn Zero: Part-Time Hero	• Action/adventure • Comedy-drama • Science fantasy	2 seasons, 35 episodes	• Jared Bush • Sam Levine	December 5, 2014 – July 28, 2017	Disney XD	• Mercury Filmworks (season 1) •Tycoon Animation (season 2) • Top Draw Animation (additional (season 2)) • Disney Television Animation	TV-Y7	Flash/Toon Boom
All Hail King Julien	Comedy	6 seasons, 78 episodes	Tom McGrath	December 19, 2014 – December 1, 2017	Netflix	DreamWorks Animation Television	TV-Y7	CGI
The Adventures of Puss in Boots	• Action • Adventure • Comedy	6 seasons, 78 episodes	DreamWorks Animation	January 16, 2015 – January 26, 2018	Netflix	DreamWorks Animation Television	TV-Y7	CGI
Star vs. the Forces of Evil	• Action • Fantasy • Comedy drama • Adventure • Magical girl	4 seasons, 77 episodes	Daron Nefcy	January 18, 2015 – May 19, 2019	• Disney XD (2015–2018) • Disney Channel (2019)	Disney Television Animation	TV-Y7	Flash (Season 1)/Traditional (Seasons 2-4)
Miles from Tomorrowland	Science fiction	3 seasons, 144 episodes	Sascha Paladino	February 6, 2015 – September 10, 2018	Disney Junior	• DQ Entertainment • Wild Canary Animation	TV-Y	CGI
Transformers: Robots in Disguise	• Action • Adventure • Science fiction • Superhero • Mecha	3 seasons, 71 episodes		March 14, 2015 – November 11, 2017	Cartoon Network	• Hasbro Studios • Darby Pop Productions (seasons 1 and 2) • Polygon Pictures	TV-Y7	Traditional
Harvey Beaks	• Adventure • Comedy • Fantasy	2 seasons, 52 episodes	C. H. Greenblatt	March 28, 2015 – December 29, 2017	• Nickelodeon (2015–16) • Nicktoons (2017)	Nickelodeon Animation Studio	TV-Y7	Traditional
Lego Star Wars: Droid Tales	Miniseries	1 season, 5 episodes	George Lucas	July 6, 2015 – November 2, 2015	Disney XD	• Lucasfilm • Lucasfilm Animation • The Lego Group	TV-Y7	CGI
Pig Goat Banana Cricket	Surreal comedy	2 seasons, 52 episodes	• Dave Cooper • Johnny Ryan	July 16, 2015 – August 11, 2018	• Nickelodeon (2015–16) • Nicktoons (2016–18)	Nickelodeon Animation Studio	TV-Y7	Flash/Traditional
We Bare Bears	• Comedy • Coming-of-age story	4 seasons, 140 episodes	Daniel Chong	July 27, 2015 – May 27, 2019	Cartoon Network	Cartoon Network Studios	TV-Y7	Traditional
Two More Eggs	• Surreal humor • Comedy	3 seasons, 90 episodes	Noah Z. Jones	August 10, 2015 – September 4, 2017	Disney XD	• Citywide Hoop Champs Inc. • Disney Television Animation • Cyber Group Studios	TV-Y7	Flash
Dinotrux	Comedy	8 seasons, 78 episodes	Chris Gall	August 14, 2015 – August 3, 2018	Netflix	DreamWorks Animation Television	TV-Y7	CGI
Guardians of the Galaxy	• Action • Adventure • Comedy • Science fiction • Superhero	3 seasons, 77 episodes	Marty Isenberg	September 5, 2015 – June 9, 2019	Disney XD	Marvel Animation	TV-Y7	Traditional
Pickle and Peanut	• Surreal humor • Comedy	2 seasons, 42 episodes	Noah Z. Jones	September 7, 2015 – January 20, 2018	Disney XD	Disney Television Animation	TV-Y7	Flash
Goldie & Bear	• Fantasy • Musical	2 seasons, 45 episodes	• Jorge Aguirre • Rick Gitelson	September 12, 2015 – October 1, 2018	Disney Junior	• Milk Barn Entertainment (season 1) • Titmouse, Inc. (season 2)	TV-Y	CGI
Wabbit/New Looney Tunes	Comedy	3 seasons, 156 episodes	Erik Kuska	September 21, 2015 – January 30, 2020	• Cartoon Network • Boomerang	Warner Bros. Animation	TV-Y7	Traditional
Be Cool, Scooby-Doo!	• Horror • Comedy • Mystery	2 seasons, 52 episodes	Jon Colton Barry	October 5, 2015 – March 18, 2018	• Cartoon Network (2015–16) • Boomerang (2017–18)	Warner Bros. Animation	TV-Y7	Traditional
The Mr. Peabody & Sherman Show	Comedy	4 seasons, 52 episodes		October 9, 2015 – April 21, 2017	Netflix	• Jay Ward Productions • DreamWorks Animation Television	TV-Y7	Flash
Care Bears & Cousins	• Adventure • Comedy • Fantasy	2 seasons, 12 episodes		November 6, 2015 – February 5, 2016	Netflix	• Splash Entertainment • American Greetings	TV-Y	CGI
The Lion Guard	Adventure	2 seasons, 45 episodes	Ford Riley	• Pilot: November 22, 2015 • Original series: January 15, 2016 – November 3, 2019	Disney Junior	Disney Television Animation	TV-Y	Flash/Toon Boom
Long Live the Royals	Miniseries	1 season, 4 episodes	Sean Szeles	November 30, 2015 – December 3, 2015	Cartoon Network	Cartoon Network Studios	TV-PG	Traditional
Dawn of the Croods	• Adventure • Comedy	4 seasons, 88 episodes	Brendan Hay	December 24, 2015 – July 7, 2017	Netflix	DreamWorks Animation Television	TV-Y7	Traditional
Mack & Moxy	Puppetry	1 season, 12 episodes	Brahm Wenger	February 5, 2016 – August 5, 2016	PBS Kids	Georgia Public Broadcasting	TV-Y	CGI
Bunnicula	• Action • Adventure • Comedy • Fantasy	3 seasons, 104 episodes	Jessica Borutski	February 6, 2016 – December 30, 2018	• Cartoon Network (2016) • Boomerang (2017–18)	Warner Bros. Animation	TV-Y7	Flash
Lego Star Wars: The Resistance Rises	Miniseries	1 season, 5 episodes	George Lucas	February 15, 2016 – May 4, 2016	Disney XD	• Lucasfilm • Lucasfilm Animation • The Lego Group	TV-Y7	CGI
Ready Jet Go!	• Science fiction • Educational	2 seasons, 67 episodes	Craig Bartlett	February 15, 2016 – July 20, 2023	PBS Kids	• Wind Dancer Films • Snee-Oosh, Inc.	TV-Y	CGI
Lego Bionicle: The Journey to One	• Action • Adventure • Drama • Fantasy	1 season, 4 episodes	Mark Palmer	March 4, 2016 – July 29, 2016	Netflix	• The Outlook Company • The Volta	TV-Y7	CGI
The Powerpuff Girls (2016)	• Fantasy • Action • Adventure • Superhero • Comedy	3 seasons, 122 episodes	Craig McCracken	April 4, 2016 – June 16, 2019	Cartoon Network	Cartoon Network Studios	TV-Y7	Traditional
The Loud House	Comedy	10 seasons, 311 episodes	Chris Savino	May 2, 2016 – present	Nickelodeon	Nickelodeon Animation Studio	TV-Y7	Toon Boom (seasons 1-3)/Flash (seasons 4-present)
Voltron: Legendary Defender	• Action • Adventure • Science fantasy	8 seasons, 78 episodes		June 10, 2016 – December 14, 2018	Netflix	• World Events Productions • DreamWorks Animation Television • Studio Mir	TV-Y7	Traditional
Lego Star Wars: The Freemaker Adventures	• Action • Science fiction	2 seasons, 26 episodes	George Lucas	June 20, 2016 – August 16, 2017	Disney XD	• Wil Film ApS • Lucasfilm • Lucasfilm Animation • The Lego Group	TV-Y7	CGI
Word Party	Educational	4 seasons, 52 episodes	Alex Rockwell	July 8, 2016 – March 2, 2021	Netflix	The Jim Henson Company	TV-Y	CGI
Elena of Avalor	• Adventure • Fantasy	3 seasons, 77 episodes	Craig Gerber	July 22, 2016 – August 23, 2020	• Disney Channel (2016–18) • Disney Junior (2018–20)	Disney Television Animation	TV-Y	CGI
Home: Adventures with Tip & Oh	Comic science fiction	4 seasons, 52 episodes	• Ryan Crego • Thurop Van Orman	July 29, 2016 – July 20, 2018	Netflix	• Titmouse, Inc. • DreamWorks Animation Television	TV-Y7	Flash
Future-Worm!	Comic science fiction	1 season, 20 episodes	Ryan Quincy	August 1, 2016 – June 29, 2018	Disney XD	• Quincy Productions • Disney Television Animation • Bento Box Entertainment (shorts) • Titmouse, Inc. (series)	TV-Y7	Flash
Ask the StoryBots	Educational	3 seasons, 22 episodes	• Gregg Spiridellis • Evan Spiridellis	August 12, 2016 – August 2, 2019	Netflix	• JibJab Bros. Studios (2016–18) • StoryBots Inc. (2019)	TV-Y	CGI/Live action/Flash/Puppet/Stop motion
Right Now Kapow	Sketch comedy	1 season, 26 episodes	• Justin Becker • Marly Halpern-Graser	September 19, 2016 – May 31, 2017	Disney XD	Warner Bros. Animation	TV-Y7	Flash
Mighty Magiswords	• Fantasy • Comedy	2 seasons, 92 episodes	Kyle Carrozza	September 29, 2016 – May 17, 2019	Cartoon Network	Cartoon Network Studios	TV-Y7	Flash
Milo Murphy's Law	Comedy	2 seasons, 40 episodes	• Dan Povenmire • Jeff "Swampy" Marsh	October 3, 2016 – May 18, 2019	• Disney XD (2016–17) • Disney Channel (2018–19)	Disney Television Animation	TV-Y7	Traditional
StoryBots Super Songs	Educational	1 season, 5 episodes	• Gregg Spiridellis • Evan Spiridellis	October 7, 2016	Netflix	JibJab Bros. Studios	TV-Y	Flash/Live Action
Skylanders Academy	• Action • Adventure • Comedy • Fantasy	3 seasons, 38 episodes		October 28, 2016 – September 28, 2018	Netflix	• TeamTO • Activision Blizzard Studios	TV-Y7	CGI
Splash and Bubbles	• Adventure • Comedy • Educational • Musical	1 season, 40 episodes	John Tartaglia	November 23, 2016 – August 6, 2018	PBS Kids	• The Jim Henson Company • Herschend Studios	TV-Y	CGI
Justice League Action	• Action • Adventure • Drama • Science fiction	1 season, 52 episodes		December 16, 2016 – June 3, 2018	Cartoon Network	• Warner Bros. Animation • DC Entertainment	TV-Y7	Traditional
Trollhunters: Tales of Arcadia	• Action • Adventure • Comedy-drama • Science fantasy	3 parts, 52 episodes	Guillermo del Toro	December 23, 2016 – May 25, 2018	Netflix	• DreamWorks Animation Television • Double Dare You Productions	TV-Y7	CGI
We're Lalaloopsy	Fantasy	1 seasons, 13 episodes	MGA Entertainment	January 10, 2017	Netflix	• MGA Entertainment • Splash Entertainment	TV-Y	Flash
Hanazuki: Full of Treasures	• Comedy-drama • Science fiction • Fantasy • Adventure	2 seasons, 35 episodes	MGA Entertainment	January 12, 2017 – May 4, 2019	• YouTube (2017) • Discovery Family (2018–19)	• Titmouse, Inc. (seasons 1–2) • Hasbro Studios (season 1) • Allspark Animation (season 2) • Inspidea	TV-Y7	Flash
Mickey and the Roadster Racers/Mickey Mouse Mixed-Up Adventures	• Educational • Musical • Adventure • Sports (Auto racing) • Comedy	3 seasons, 87 episodes	Bobs Gannaway	January 15, 2017 – October 1, 2021	Disney Junior	Disney Television Animation	TV-Y	CGI
Bunsen Is a Beast	• Comedy • Adventure • Slapstick	1 season, 26 episodes	Butch Hartman	January 16, 2017 – February 10, 2018	• Nickelodeon (episodes 1–16) • Nicktoons (episodes 17–26)	• Billionfold Inc. • Nickelodeon Animation Studio	TV-Y7	Flash
Nella the Princess Knight	Preschool • Action • Science fiction • Musical • Adventure	2 seasons, 65 episodes	Christine Ricci	February 6, 2017 – December 8, 2019	• Nickelodeon • Nick Jr. Channel	• Brown Bag Films • Nickelodeon Animation Studio	TV-Y	Flash
School of Roars	• Educational	2 seasons, 104 episodes	Alan Robinson	February 6, 2017 – August 20, 2021	• CBeebies	• Dot to Dot Productions • Monster Paw Animation	TV-Y	Flash
VeggieTales in the City	• Comedy • Christian	2 seasons, 26 episodes	Doug TenNapel	February 24, 2017 – September 15, 2017	Netflix	• DreamWorks Animation Television • Big Idea Entertainment	TV-Y	CGI
Buddy Thunderstruck	Comedy	1 season, 12 episodes	Ryan Wiesbrock	March 10, 2017	Netflix	• American Greetings Entertainment • Stoopid Buddy Stoodios	TV-Y7	Stop-motion
Tangled: The Series/Rapunzel's Tangled Adventure	• Adventure • Fantasy	3 seasons, 60 episodes	• Chris Sonnenburg • Shane Prigmore	March 10, 2017 – March 1, 2020	Disney Channel	Disney Television Animation	TV-Y7	Toon Boom
Ben 10 (2016)	• Science fantasy • Action • Adventure • Superhero • Comedy	4 seasons, 172 episodes	Man of Action Entertainment	April 10, 2017 – April 11, 2021	Cartoon Network	Cartoon Network Studios	TV-Y7	Traditional
Puppy Dog Pals	• Fantasy • Musical • Adventure	5 seasons, 116 episodes	Harland Williams	April 14, 2017 – January 20, 2023	Disney Junior	• Wild Canary Animation • Disney Television Animation	TV-Y	CGI
Spirit Riding Free	Adventure	11 seasons, 72 episodes	Aury Wallington	May 5, 2017 – December 8, 2020	Netflix	DreamWorks Animation Television	TV-Y7	CGI
Billy Dilley's Super-Duper Subterranean Summer	• Adventure • Comedy	1 season, 13 episodes	Aaron Springer	June 3, 2017 – June 15, 2017	Disney XD	Disney Television Animation • Rough Draft Studios	TV-Y7	Traditional
Dorothy and the Wizard of Oz	• Adventure • Comedy • Fantasy	3 seasons, 59 episodes		June 29, 2017 – July 31, 2020	Boomerang	• Turner Entertainment • Warner Bros. Animation	TV-Y7	Flash
Danger & Eggs	Comedy	1 season, 26 episodes	• Mike Owens • Shadi Petosky	June 30, 2017	Amazon Video	• Amazon Studios • PUNY • Saerom Animation	TV-G	Traditional
Niko and the Sword of Light	• Action • Adventure • Fantasy	2 seasons, 23 episodes		July 20, 2017 – September 6, 2019	Amazon Video	• Amazon Studios • Titmouse, Inc.	TV-G	Flash
OK K.O.! Let's Be Heroes	• Action • Comedy	3 seasons, 112 episodes	Ian Jones-Quartey	August 1, 2017 – September 6, 2019	Cartoon Network	Cartoon Network Studios	TV-Y7	Traditional
Lost in Oz	Fantasy	2 seasons, 26 episodes		August 7, 2017 – June 8, 2018	Amazon Video	Amazon Studios	TV-Y7	CGI
DuckTales (2017)	• Adventure • Comedy	3 seasons, 69 episodes	• Matt Youngberg • Francisco Angones	August 12, 2017 – March 15, 2021	• Disney XD (2017, 2020–21) • Disney Channel (2018–19)	Disney Television Animation	TV-Y7	Traditional
Sunny Day	• Preschool • Magical girl • Science fiction • Action • Adventure • Comedy	2 seasons, 78 episodes	Abie Longstaff	August 21, 2017 – March 1, 2020	• Nickelodeon • Nick Jr. Channel	• Silvergate Media • Pipeline Studios •Nickelodeon Animation Studios	TV-Y	Flash
Wacky Races (2017)	• Action • Comedy • Fantasy	2 seasons, 78 episodes	• Rebecca Himot • Tramm Wigzell	August 22, 2017 – November 24, 2019	Boomerang	• Hanna-Barbera • Warner Bros. Animation	TV-Y7	Traditional
Stretch Armstrong and the Flex Fighters	• Superhero • Action	2 seasons, 23 episodes	• Kevin Burke • Victor Cook • Chris "Doc" Wyatt	November 17, 2017 – September 7, 2018	Netflix	Hasbro Studios	TV-Y7	Traditional
Big Hero 6: The Series	• Superhero • Action • Science fiction	3 seasons, 56 episodes	• Mark McCorkle • Bob Schooley • Nick Filippi	November 20, 2017 – February 15, 2021	• Disney XD (2017, 2020–21) • Disney Channel (2018–19)	Disney Television Animation	TV-Y7	Traditional
Pete the Cat	• Comedy • Musical • Slice of life	2 seasons, 41 episodes	Jeff "Swampy" Marsh	December 26, 2017 – March 11, 2022	Amazon Prime Video	• Amazon Studios • Alcon Television Group • Appian Way Productions • Surfer Jack Studios	TV-G	Flash
The Adventures of Kid Danger	Superhero comedy	1 season, 10 episodes	Dan Schneider	January 15, 2018 – June 14, 2018	Nickelodeon	• Schneider's Bakery • Powerhouse Animation Studios • Nickelodeon Animation Studio	TV-Y7	Flash
Trolls: The Beat Goes On!	• Fantasy • Musical • Comedy	8 seasons, 52 episodes		January 19, 2018 – November 22, 2019	Netflix	DreamWorks Animation Television	TV-Y7	Flash/Traditional
Apple & Onion	Surreal comedy	2 seasons, 76 episodes	George Gendi	February 23, 2018 – December 7, 2021	Cartoon Network	Cartoon Network Studios	TV-Y7	Flash
Muppet Babies (2018)	• Musical • Comedy • Fantasy	3 seasons, 71 episodes	• Mr. Warburton • Chris Hamiliton	March 23, 2018 – February 18, 2022	Disney Junior	• The Muppets Studio • Odd Bot Animation • Snowball Studios	TV-Y	CGI
Craig of the Creek	• Drama • Adventure • Comedy	6 seasons, 180 episodes	• Matt Burnett • Ben Levin	• Pilot: December 1, 2017 (CN App) • Series: February 19, 2018 (CN App & Online) • March 30, 2018 – January 25, 2025 (TV)	Cartoon Network	Cartoon Network Studios	TV-Y7	Traditional
The Boss Baby: Back in Business	Comedy	4 seasons, 49 episodes	Brandon Sawyer	April 6, 2018 – November 17, 2020	Netflix	DreamWorks Animation Television	TV-Y7	CGI
Spy Kids: Mission Critical	• Comedy • Adventure	2 seasons, 20 episodes	• Michael Hefferon • Robert Rodriguez • F.M. De Marco • Sean Jara	April 20, 2018 – November 30, 2018	Netflix	Dimension Television	TV-Y7	CGI
Little Big Awesome	• Adventure • Comedy	1 season, 13 episodes	Tomi Dieguez	April 26 – November 8, 2018	Amazon Prime Video	• Titmouse, Inc. • Amazon Studios	TV-Y	Traditional
The Adventures of Rocky and Bullwinkle	• Adventure • Fantasy	1 season, 26 episodes	• Marco Schnabel • David P. Smith	May 11, 2018 – January 11, 2019	Amazon Prime Video	• Jay Ward Productions • DreamWorks Animation Television	TV-Y	Flash
Legend of the Three Caballeros	• Action-adventure • Comedy	1 season, 13 episodes	Disney Digital Network	June 9, 2018	DisneyLife	Disney Digital Network	TV-Y7	Flash
Big City Greens	• Adventure • Comedy • Slice of life	4 seasons, 110 episodes	The Houghton Brothers	June 18, 2018 – present	Disney Channel	Disney Television Animation	TV-Y7	Traditional
Harvey Girls Forever!	• Comedy • Musical	4 seasons, 52 episodes	• Tedd Anasti • Patsy Cameron-Anasti	June 29, 2018 – January 10, 2020	Netflix	• DreamWorks Animation Television • DreamWorks Classics	TV-Y7	Traditional
Summer Camp Island	• Comedy • Adventure • Fantasy	6 seasons, 120 episodes	Julia Pott	July 7, 2018 – August 11, 2023	• Cartoon Network (2018–2023) • HBO Max (2020–21)	Cartoon Network Studios	TV-Y7	Traditional
The Epic Tales of Captain Underpants	• Action • Adventure • Comedy • Superhero	4 seasons, 45 episodes	Dav Pilkey	July 13, 2018 – December 4, 2020	Netflix	• Titmouse, Inc. • Scholastic Entertainment • DreamWorks Animation Television	TV-Y7	Flash
Fancy Nancy	• Adventure • Fantasy	2 seasons, 39 episodes	Anne Smith	July 13, 2018 – February 18, 2022	Disney Junior	Disney Television Animation	TV-Y	CGI
Rise of the Teenage Mutant Ninja Turtles	• Action/Adventure • Science fantasy	2 seasons, 39 episodes		July 20, 2018 – August 7, 2020	• Nickelodeon (2018–19) • Nicktoons (2019–20)	Nickelodeon Animation Studio	TV-Y7	Traditional
Star Wars Resistance	• Action • Science fiction	2 seasons, 40 episodes	Dave Filoni	October 7, 2018 – January 26, 2020	• Disney Channel • Disney XD	• Lucasfilm • Lucasfilm Animation • Polygon Pictures	TV-Y7	CGI
Butterbean's Cafe	• Preschool • Fantasy	2 seasons, 60 episodes	• Jonny Belt • Robert Scull	November 12, 2018 – November 1, 2020	• Nickelodeon • Nick Jr. Channel	• Brown Bag Films • Nickelodeon Animation Studios	TV-Y	CGI
She-Ra and the Princesses of Power	• Action • Adventure • Comedy-drama • Science fantasy	5 seasons, 52 episodes	ND Stevenson	November 13, 2018 – May 15, 2020	Netflix	• DreamWorks Animation Television • Mattel	TV-Y7	Traditional
Kung Fu Panda: The Paws of Destiny	• Action/Adventure • Comedy	2 seasons, 26 episodes	Elliott Owen	November 16, 2018 – July 4, 2019	Amazon Prime Video	DreamWorks Animation Television	TV-Y7	CGI
3Below: Tales of Arcadia	• Action • Adventure • Comedy-drama • Science fantasy	2 parts, 26 episodes	Guillermo del Toro	December 21, 2018 – July 12, 2019	Netflix	• DreamWorks Animation Television • Double Dare You Productions	TV-Y7	CGI
Pinky Malinky	Surreal comedy	3 parts, 60 episodes	• Chris Garbutt • Rikke Asbjoern	January 1, 2019 – July 17, 2019	Netflix	Nickelodeon Animation Studio	TV-Y7	Flash
Rainbow Butterfly Unicorn Kitty	• Adventure • Comedy • Fantasy	1 season, 26 episodes	Rich Magallanes	January 27, 2019 – December 1, 2019	• Nickelodeon • Nicktoons	Funrise Toys	TV-Y7	Flash
DC Super Hero Girls	• Action • Adventure • Comedy	2 seasons, 78 episodes	Lauren Faust	March 8, 2019 – October 24, 2021	Cartoon Network	• Warner Bros. Animation • DC Comics	TV-Y7	Flash
Victor and Valentino	• Mystery • Supernatural • Adventure • Comedy	3 seasons, 119 episodes	Diego Molano	March 30, 2019 – August 26, 2022	Cartoon Network	Cartoon Network Studios	TV-Y7	Traditional
T.O.T.S.	• Preschool • Musical	3 seasons, 75 episodes	Travis Braun	June 14, 2019 – June 10, 2022	Disney Junior	Titmouse, Inc.	TV-Y	CGI
Amphibia	• Comedy • Adventure • Fantasy	3 seasons, 58 episodes	Matt Braly	June 17, 2019 – May 14, 2022	Disney Channel	Disney Television Animation	TV-Y7	Traditional
Scooby-Doo and Guess Who?	• Comedy • Mystery	2 seasons, 39 episodes		June 27, 2019 – October 1, 2021	Boomerang	Warner Bros. Animation	TV-PG	Traditional
Mao Mao: Heroes of Pure Heart	• Comedy • Action • Adventure • Science fantasy	1 season, 40 episodes	Parker Simmons	July 1, 2019 – July 17, 2020	Cartoon Network	Cartoon Network Studios	TV-Y7	Flash
Where's Waldo?	Mystery	2 seasons, 39 episodes	• Koyalee Chanda • Lucas Mills	July 20, 2019 – July 3, 2021	Universal Kids (2019) • Peacock (2020–2021)	DreamWorks Animation Television	TV-Y7-FV	Flash
Twelve Forever	• Action • Adventure • Surreal comedy • Fantasy • Coming-of-age	1 season, 25 episodes	Julia Vickerman	July 29, 2019	Netflix	• Puny Entertainment • The Cartel	TV-PG	Traditional
Infinity Train	• Science fantasy • Drama • Mystery • Anthology	4 seasons, 40 episodes	Owen Dennis	• Pilot: November 1, 2016 • Series: August 5, 2019 – April 15, 2021	• Cartoon Network (2019–20) • HBO Max (2020–21)	Cartoon Network Studios	TV-Y7	Traditional
Middle School Moguls	Miniseries	1 season, 4 episodes	• Gina Heitkamp • Jenae Heitkamp	September 2, 2019 – September 29, 2019	Nickelodeon	• Gengirl Media • Nickelodeon Animation Studio	TV-Y7	CGI
Archibald's Next Big Thing	• Adventure • Comedy	6 seasons, 50 episodes	Tony Hale	September 6, 2019 – October 14, 2021	• Netflix (2019–20) • Peacock (2021)	DreamWorks Animation Television	TV-Y	Flash
DreamWorks Dragons: Rescue Riders	• Preschool • Adventure • Comedy	6 seasons, 53 episodes	• Jack Thomas • Johnny Belt • Robert Scull	September 27, 2019 – September 29, 2022	Netflix	DreamWorks Animation Television	TV-Y	CGI
The Casagrandes	Comedy	3 seasons, 70 episodes		October 14, 2019 – September 30, 2022	Nickelodeon	Nickelodeon Animation Studio	TV-Y7	Flash/Toon Boom
The VeggieTales Show	• Comedy • Christian	1 season, 26 episodes		October 22, 2019 – April 1, 2022	TBN	• Prana Studios • Big Idea Entertainment	TV-Y	CGI
Hello Ninja	• Preschool • Action • Adventure	4 seasons, 39 episodes	N. D. Wilson	November 1, 2019 – January 19, 2021	Netflix	Gorilla Poet Productions	TV-Y	CGI
Green Eggs and Ham	• Fantasy • Adventure • Comedy-drama	2 seasons, 23 episodes	Jared Stern	November 8, 2019 – April 8, 2022	Netflix	• Gulfstream Pictures • A Stern Talking To • A Very Good Production • Warner Bros. Animation	TV-Y7	Traditional
The Rocketeer	• Superhero • Adventure • Action • Science fiction	1 season, 22 episodes	Travis Braun	November 8, 2019 – August 2, 2020	Disney Junior	• Wild Canary Animation • ICON Creative Studio, Inc.	TV-Y	CGI
Forky Asks a Question	Comedy	1 season, 10 episodes	Bob Peterson	November 12, 2019 – January 10, 2020	Disney+	Pixar Animation Studios	TV-G	CGI
Steven Universe Future	• Action • Science fantasy • Comedy-drama • Coming of age	1 seasons, 20 episodes	Rebecca Sugar	December 7, 2019 – March 27, 2020	Cartoon Network	Cartoon Network Studios	TV-PG	Traditional
Fast & Furious Spy Racers	• Action • Sports	6 seasons, 52 episodes		December 26, 2019 – December 17, 2021	Netflix	• Original Film • One Race Films • Universal Pictures • DreamWorks Animation Television	TV-Y7	CGI

=== Brazil ===
Title	Genre	Seasons/episodes	Show creator(s)	Original release	Network	Studio	Technique
Trunk Train	Comedy	3 seasons, 52 episodes	Zé Brandão	April 7, 2011 – January 7, 2017	• TV Cultura • TV Brasil • Cartoon Network	Copa Studio	Flash
Haunted Tales for Wicked Kids	• Comedy-horror • Adventure	2 seasons, 40 episodes	Victor-Hugo Borges	March 4, 2013 – April 25, 2016	Cartoon Network Brazil	• Glaz Entretenimento • Copa Studio • BRDE • FSA • Ancine	Flash
Jorel's Brother	• Slapstick • Surreal comedy • Satire	5 seasons, 127 episodes	Juliano Enrico	September 22, 2014 – May 16, 2025	Cartoon Network	• TV Quase • Copa Studio; Cartoon Network LA Original Productions	Flash/Traditional
WeeBoom	• Comedy • Adventure	1 season, 26 episodes	Jonas Brandão	July 5, 2019 – May 24, 2020	Boomerang	• Agência Nacional do Cinema • Split Studio; Turner Broadcasting System Latin America	Flash

=== United Kingdom ===
Title	Genre	Seasons/episodes	Show creator(s)	Original release	Network	Studio	Technique
Alphablocks	• Preschool • Educational	5 seasons, 130 episodes	Joe Elliot	January 25, 2010 – present	CBeebies	• Magic Lantern • Alphablocks Ltd. • Blue Zoo Animation Studio	CGI
Wallace & Gromit's World of Invention	• Comedy • Documentary • Family	1 season, 6 episodes	Nick Park	3 November 2010 – 8 December 2010	BBC One	Aardman Animations	Stop-motion, Live-action
Hey Duggee	• Preschool • Adventure • Comedy • Educational television	5 seasons, 216 episodes	Grant Orchard	December 17, 2014 – present	CBeebies	Studio AKA	Flash
Go Jetters	• Action • Adventure • Superhero	3 seasons, 154 episodes	• Barry Quinn • Katie Simmons	October 26, 2015 – November 27, 2020	CBeebies	• Boulder Media • Giant Animation • BBC Studios Kids & Family • Blue-Zoo Productions (Series 2–3)	CGI
Numberblocks	• Educational • Preschool	7 seasons, 139 episodes	Joe Elliot	January 23, 2017 – present	CBeebies	• Alphablocks Ltd. • Blue-Zoo	CGI
Dennis & Gnasher: Unleashed!	Comedy	2 seasons, 103 episodes		November 6, 2017 – March 17, 2021	• CBBC • Netflix	• Beano Studios • CBBC Production • Jellyfish Pictures	CGI
101 Dalmatian Street	Comedy	1 season, 26 episodes	Miklos Weigert	March 18, 2019 – February 22, 2020	Disney Channel	Passion Animation Studios	Flash
The Rubbish World of Dave Spud	• Comedy-adventure • Animated sitcom • Fantasy • Deadpan humor	3 seasons, 104 episodes	Edward Foster	September 2, 2019 – September 12, 2024	• CITV • ITVX	• The Illuminated Film Company • Cloth Cat Animation	Flash

=== Canada ===
Title	Genre	Seasons/episodes	Show creator(s)	Original release	Network	Studio	Technique
Sidekick	• Comedy • Action • Adventure • Superhero • Slapstick	3 seasons, 52 episodes	• Todd Kauffman • Joey So	September 3, 2010 – September 14, 2013	YTV	Nelvana	Flash
Pirates: Adventures in Art	• Educational • Adventure	2 seasons, 44 episodes	Jeff Rosen	December 18, 2010 – October 15, 2011	CBC Television	• Halifax Film Company • Decode Entertainment	CGI
Wild Kratts	Educational	7 seasons, 174 episodes	• Chris Kratt • Martin Kratt	January 3, 2011 – present	• PBS Kids Go! (2011–13) • PBS Kids (2013–present)	• Kratt Brothers Company • 9 Story Media Group	Flash
Almost Naked Animals	Comedy	3 seasons, 52 episodes	Noah Z. Jones	January 7, 2011 – May 22, 2013	YTV	9 Story Entertainment	Flash
Scaredy Squirrel	• Comedy • Surreal comedy • Animated sitcom • Slapstick comedy	3 seasons, 52 episodes	• Matt Ferguson • Jillian Ruby	April 1, 2011 – August 17, 2013	YTV	Nelvana	Flash
Rated A for Awesome	Comedy	1 season, 26 episodes	Asaph Fipke	September 3, 2011 – February 25, 2012	YTV	Nerd Corps Entertainment	CGI
Detentionaire	• Mystery • Thriller • Sci-fi • Action-adventure • Comedy drama	4 seasons, 53 episodes	• Daniel Bryan Franklin • Charles Johnston	September 12, 2011 – January 29, 2015	Teletoon	Nelvana	Flash
Slugterra	• Action • Subterranean fiction • Science fantasy • Comedy • Science fiction Western	6 seasons, 63 episodes	Asaph Fipke	September 3, 2012 – October 25, 2016	• Family Channel • Disney XD/Family CHRGD	• Nerd Corps Entertainment (seasons 1–4) • DHX Media (seasons 5–6)	CGI
Rocket Monkeys	Science fiction comedy	3 seasons, 66 episodes	• Dan Abdo • Jason Patterson	January 10, 2013 – November 23, 2016	Teletoon	• Breakthrough Entertainment • Atomic Cartoons • Hornet Films	Flash
Grojband	• Comedy • Musical	1 season, 26 episodes	Todd Kauffman • Mark Thornton	June 10, 2013 – April 12, 2015	• Cartoon Network (United States) • Teletoon (Canada)	• Elliott Animation • Neptoon Studios • Fresh TV • FremantleMedia Enterprises	Flash
Camp Lakebottom	• Adventure • Fantasy • Action • Comedy-horror	3 seasons, 65 episodes	• Eric Jacobson • Betsy McGowen	July 4, 2013 – July 24, 2017	• Teletoon (Canada) • Disney XD (United States)	• Skywriter Media & Entertainment Group • Jam Filled Entertainment • 9 Story Media Group	Flash
Oh No! It's an Alien Invasion	• Comedy • Sci-fi	2 seasons, 40 episodes	• Philippe Ivanusic-Vallée • Peter Ricq	August 3, 2013 – April 30, 2015	• YTV • Teletoon	Nelvana	CGI
Paw Patrol	• Preschool • Action • Adventure	13 seasons, 301 episodes	Keith Chapman	August 12, 2013 – present	TVOntario	Spin Master Entertainment	CGI
Ella the Elephant	Preschool	1 season, 26 episodes	—N/a	September 2, 2013 – January 23, 2014	TVOKids	• DHX Cookie Jar Inc. • FremantleMedia Kids & Family	CGI
Numb Chucks	• Adventure-comedy • Fantasy • Slapstick comedy	2 seasons, 52 episodes	• Phil LaFrance • Jamie LeClaire	January 7, 2014 – December 1, 2016	• YTV (Canada) • Boomerang (United States)	• Jam Filled Entertainment • 9 Story Media Group	Flash
Nerds and Monsters	• Comedy • Science fiction • Action-adventure	2 seasons, 40 episodes	• Josh Mepham • Kathy Antonsen Rocchio • Greg Sullivan • Vito Viscomi	March 12, 2014 – August 27, 2016	YTV	• Slap Happy Cartoons Inc. • 9 Story Media Group	Flash
Fangbone!	• Action comedy • Adventure	1 season, 26 episodes	• Simon Racioppa •	May 4, 2014 – January 24, 2017	Family Chrgd	• Mercury Filmworks (episode 1) • Radical Sheep Productions • • DHX Media • Pipeline Studios	Flash
Dr. Dimensionpants	• Superhero • Comedy	2 seasons, 26 episodes	Brad Peyton	November 6, 2014 – September 22, 2015	Teletoon	• DHX Media • The Factory Backwards Entertainment	Flash
Inspector Gadget	• Action • Adventure • Comedy • Science fiction	4 seasons, 52 episodes	• Eric Lewald • Julia Lewald	January 3, 2015 – May 18, 2018	• Teletoon (seasons 1–2) • Family Channel (seasons 3–4)	• DHX Media • DHX Studios Halifax	CGI
Endangered Species	Comedy	1 season, 26 episodes	Asaph Fipke	March 3 – June 2, 2015	Teletoon	Nerd Corps Entertainment	CGI
Total Drama Presents: The Ridonculous Race	• Comedy • Parody • Satire	1 season, 26 episodes	• Jennifer Pertsch • Tom McGillis	September 7, 2015 – October 9, 2015	• Teletoon (Canada) • Cartoon Network (United States)	Fresh TV	Flash
Supernoobs	• Action • Comedy • Sci-fi • Animated sitcom • Superhero • Adventure	2 seasons, 104 episodes	Scott Fellows	November 2, 2015 – February 7, 2019	• Canada: Teletoon and Family Channel • United States: Cartoon Network	• DHX Media • DHX Studios Vancouver	Flash
Looped	• Comedy • Science fiction • Fantasy	1 season, 26 episodes	• Todd Kauffman • Mark Thornton	March 2 – August 16, 2016	Teletoon	DHX Media	Flash
Freaktown	Comedy horror	1 season, 26 episodes	• Peter Ricq • Philippe Ivanusic-Vallée	June 20 – October 9, 2016	Teletoon	Portfolio Entertainment	Flash
The Bagel and Becky Show	• Slapstick • Surreal humor	1 season, 26 episodes	Dave Cooper	November 14, 2016 – March 3, 2017	Teletoon	• Radical Sheep Productions • Jam Filled Entertainment	Flash
ToonMarty	• Adventure • Comedy • Slapstick • Fantasy	1 season, 20 episodes	• Robin Balzano • Pasacle Beaulieu • Paul Stoica • Frédérick Wolfe	May 1 – May 25, 2017	Teletoon	Sardine Productions	Flash
Chuck's Choice	Comedy	1 season, 20 episodes	Kervin Faria	May 6 – June 9, 2017	YTV	• DHX Media/Vancouver • Corus Entertainment	Flash
3 Amigonauts	Comedy	1 season, 26 episodes	Kyle Marshall	August 5 – September 28, 2017	YTV	• 9 Story Media Group • Corus Entertainment	Flash
Wishfart	• Fantasy comedy • Surreal humour • Urban fantasy	1 season, 40 episodes	• John Hazlett • Lienne Sawatsky • Daniel Williams	September 5, 2017 – November 9, 2018	Teletoon	• Wishfart Productions Inc. • Slap Happy Cartoons • Nelvana Enterprises • Corus Entertainment	Flash
Top Wing	• Preschool • Adventure	2 seasons, 52 episodes	Matthew Fernandes	November 6, 2017 – July 2, 2020	Treehouse TV	• Industrial Brothers • 9 Story Media Group • Nickelodeon Productions	CGI
Snowsnaps	• Preschool • Adventure • Comedy	1 season, 26 episodes	Marie-Claude Beauchamp	September 1 – November 25, 2018	Télétoon / Treehouse TV	• Carpediem Film & TVSinging Frog Studio • Corus Entertainment • Technicolor Creative Services Montreal	CGI
Chop Chop Ninja	• Action • Comedy	1 season, 20 episodes	—N/a	October 6 – December 9, 2018	Teletoon	• Sardine Productions • Gamerizon	Flash
Abby Hatcher	• Preschool • Educational	2 seasons, 52 episodes	Rob Hoegee	January 1, 2019 – April 2, 2022	Nick Jr. Channel	• Guru Studio • Spin Master Entertainment	CGI
Corn & Peg	• Comedy • Fantasy • Musical • Slice of life	2 seasons, 40 episodes		February 22, 2019 – October 8, 2020	Treehouse TV	Nelvana	Flash
D.N. Ace	• Comedy • Adventure • Science fiction • Action	1 season, 40 episodes	Matthew Wexler	July 6, 2019 – April 11, 2020	Teletoon	• Nelvana • Yeti Farm • Wexworks Media	Flash
Agent Binky: Pets of the Universe	Space adventure	3 seasons, 78 episodes	• Carolyn Hay • Hugh Duffy	September 7, 2019 – March 31, 2024	Treehouse TV	• Nelvana • Redknot	CGI
Kingdom Force	• Superhero • Science fantasy • Action-adventure • Comedy	1 season, 26 episodes	Matthew Fernandes	December 7, 2019 – September 9, 2020	• CBC Kids • Radio-Canada	• Industrial Brothers • Boat Rocker Media • Jam Filled Entertainment	CGI

=== France ===
Title	Genre	Seasons/episodes	Show creator(s)	Original release	Network	Studio	Technique
Tales of Tatonka	Adventure	2 seasons, 52 episodes	Olivier Lelardoux	2010 – 2011	• TiJi • France 3 • Piwi+	Cyber Group Studios	CGI
The Daltons	• Western • Comedy	2 seasons, 191 episodes	Olivier Jean-Marie	May 31, 2010 – November 18, 2016	France 3	• Xilam • Lucky Comics • Dargaud Media • B Media Kids	Traditional
Kaeloo	• Surreal comedy • Fantasy • Slapstick • Black comedy • Adventure • Parody	5 seasons, 241 episodes	• Rémi Chapotot • Jean-François Henry • Tristan Michel	June 6, 2010 – April 13, 2023	• Canal+ (seasons 1–2) • Télétoon+ (seasons 3–4) • Canal+ Kids (season 5)	• Cube Creative • Blue Spirit (seasons 1–2) • Xilam (season 5)	CGI
Trust Me, I'm a Genie!	• Comedy • Fantasy • Adventure	1 season, 52 episodes	• Isabeau Merle • Fethi Nedjari	December 8, 2010 – July 29, 2011	• France: Canal+ Family/Canal+ and Télétoon+ • United Kingdom: CBBC	• Millimages • Amuse Films	Flash
Zig & Sharko	Slapstick-adventure comedy	4 seasons, 104 episodes	Olivier Jean-Marie	December 21, 2010 – present	• Canal+ (season 1) • Gulli (seasons 2–4) • M6 (season 4)	Xilam Animation	• Traditional • Flash (season 2)
FloopaLoo, Where Are You?	Comedy	2 seasons, 104 episodes	Marc du Pontavice	February 4, 2011 – December 4, 2014	• Canal+ Family • Télétoon+ (2014) • France 5	• Xilam • Castelrosso Films • Rai Fiction	Flash
Kobushi	Adventure-comedy	1 season, 104 episodes	Jeremy Zag	September 30, 2012	Gulli	Zagtoon	Flash
Code Lyoko: Evolution	• Action-adventure • Teen drama • Science fiction • Superhero • Cyberpunk	1 season, 26 episodes	• Tania Palumbo • Thomas Romain	January 5 – December 19, 2013	• France 4 • Canal J	• MoonScoop • Lagardère Thématiques	CGI/Live-action
The Owl & Co	• Comedy • Adventure	2 seasons, 156 episodes	• Alexandre So • Josselin Charier • Antoine Rodelet	March 25 – October 7, 2013	• France 3 • Boomerang	Studio Hari	CGI
Hubert & Takako	Comedy	1 season, 78 episodes	Hugo Gittard	November 3, 2013 – January 18, 2015	• Gulli • Canal+ • Canal J	Xilam Animation	Flash
The Jungle Bunch to the Rescue	• Fantasy • Adventure	3 seasons, 158 episodes	• Jean-François Tosti • David Alaux • Éric Tosti • Julien Fournet	December 29, 2013 – 2021	France 3	• TAT Productions • Master Films	CGI
LoliRock	• Fantasy • Music • Magical girl • Romance	2 seasons, 52 episodes	• David Michel • Jean-Louis Vandestoc	October 18, 2014 – March 2, 2017	• France 3 • Disney Channel	• Marathon Media • Zodiak Kids • MFP • B Media 2012 • Backup Films	Flash/Traditional
Get Blake!	• Comedy • Science fiction	1 season, 26 episodes	Antoine Guilbaud	March 1 – October 29, 2015	• Nickelodeon • Gulli	• Marathon Media • Zodiak Kids	Flash
Zip Zip	• Comedy • Slapstick • Adventure	2 seasons, 104 episodes	• Aurore Damant • Anne Ozannat	March 23, 2015 – 2020	France 3	GO-N Productions	Flash
Miss Moon	• Comedy • Fantasy • Adventure	1 season, 52 episodes	• Sébastien Dorsey • Laure Doyonnax	April 17, 2016 – October 8, 2017	TFOU TV	Safari de Ville	Flash
Rolling with the Ronks!	• Comedy; Science fiction	1 season, 52 episodes	• Olivier Jean-Marie • Charles Vaucelle	August 22, 2016 – June 22, 2017	• France 3 • Disney Channel	Xilam Animation	Traditional/Flash
Simon	Preschool	5 seasons, 208 episodes	Stéphanie Blake	December 17, 2016 – present	France 5	GO-N Productions	Flash
Paprika	Preschool	1 season, 78 episodes	• Jean Cayrol • Marion Billet • Baptiste Lucas	November 18, 2017 – September 17, 2019	France 5	Xilam Animation	Flash
Nate Is Late	• Comedy • Fantasy	3 seasons, 156 episodes	• Sylvain Huchet • Peter Saisselin	March 26, 2018 – present	• France 4 (France) • YouTube (season 3)	• Watch Next Media • La Factorie Animation • Superprod Studio • Nate Is Late Productions (season 1)	Flash
Taffy	• Comedy • Slapstick	2 seasons, 156 episodes	• Pierre Sissmann • Mike de Sève	December 17, 2018 – February 7, 2024	• France 4 • Gulli • Canal J	• Cyber Group Studios • Turner Broadcasting System Europe	Flash
Mr. Magoo	• Comedy • Animated sitcom	2 seasons, 150 episodes	• Olivier Jean-Marie • Hugo Gittard • Olivier Delabarre • Baptiste Lucas	May 4, 2019 – February 13, 2023	• France 4 (episodes 1–76) • CITV (episodes 77–118) • ITVX (episodes 77–150)	Xilam	Flash

=== Co-productions ===
Title	Genre	Seasons/episodes	Show creator(s)	Original release	Network	Studio	Technique
Gasp!	Comedy	1 season, 52 episodes		2010 – 2011	• ABC3 • Nine Network	• SLR Productions • Screen Australia • Agogo Media	Flash
Angelo Rules	• Comedy • Slapstick	5 seasons, 272 episodes	• Sylvie De Mathuisieulx • Sebastien Diologent	January 1, 2010 – present	• France 3 (France, seasons 1–2) • France 4 (France, season 3) • Télétoon+ (France, seasons 4–present) • Cartoon Network (United Kingdom)	• TeamTO • Cake Entertainment • International Rheingold Productions	CGI
Hero: 108	• Action • Adventure • Science fantasy • Comedy drama	2 seasons, 104 episodes	Yang-Ming Tarrng	March 1, 2010 – June 8, 2012	• Cartoon Network (United Kingdom) • Kabillion/Cartoon Network (United States)	• MoonScoop Entertainment • Gamania • Telegael • Hong Ying Animation	Flash
Chloe's Closet	Children's television series	2 seasons, 52 episodes	• Sarah Finn • Mike Young	July 12, 2010 – February 9, 2014	• PBS Kids Sprout (United States) • CITV/LittleBe (United Kingdom) • KiKa	• MoonScoop Entertainment • Telegael Teoranta • European Film Partners (season 1) • Wales Creative IP Fund (season 1) • Trickompany Filmproduktion (season 1) • Kids Workout Factory (season 2) • Minika (season 2)	Flash
Oscar's Oasis	• Silent comedy • Slapstick	1 season, 78 episodes	Tae-Sik Shin	September 5, 2010 – September 25, 2011	• Canal+ Family • Télétoon+ • TF1 • EBS	• TeamTO • Tuba Entertainment • Cake Entertainment • Synergy Media	CGI
The Cat in the Hat Knows a Lot About That!	• Science fiction • Educational	3 seasons, 80 episodes		September 6, 2010 – October 14, 2018	PBS Kids	• Collingwood & Co. • Portfolio Entertainment • Random House Children's Entertainment • KQED • Canadian Broadcasting Corporation • Corus Entertainment	Flash
Rob the Robot	Preschool	2 seasons, 104 episodes	Manuel Rosen	September 6, 2010 – February 25, 2013	• TVOntario • Knowledge Network • Radio Canada • Access	• Amberwood Entertainment • One Animation	CGI
Hero Factory	• Adventure • Science fantasy	1 season, 11 episodes		September 20, 2010 – January 9, 2014	Nicktoons	Threshold Animation Studios	CGI
Octonauts	• Action • Adventure	5 seasons, 121 episodes		October 4, 2010 – present	CBeebies	• Brown Bag Films (series 1–4) • Mainframe Studios (series 5–present) • Chorion (series 1) • Sony Pictures Television Kids (series 2–present)	CGI
My Little Pony: Friendship Is Magic	• Adventure • Fantasy • Comedy	9 seasons, 222 episodes	Lauren Faust	October 10, 2010 – October 12, 2019	Discovery Family	• Hasbro Studios • Studio B Productions (seasons 1–2)/DHX Media Vancouver (seasons 2–9)	Flash
Pound Puppies (2010)	• Comedy • Adventure	3 seasons, 65 episodes	David Sacks	October 10, 2010 – November 16, 2013	The Hub/Hub Network	• Hasbro Studios • Paul & Joe Productions (2010–11) • 9 Story Entertainment (episodes 1–7) • DHX Media Vancouver (episodes 8–65)	Flash
The Adventures of Chuck and Friends	Preschool	2 seasons, 39 episodes	Adam Beechen	October 15, 2010 – January 9, 2012	The Hub	• Hasbro Studios • Nelvana	CGI
Take Two with Phineas and Ferb	Talk show	1 season, 20 episodes	• Dan Povenmire • Jeff "Swampy" Marsh	December 3, 2010 – November 25, 2011	Disney Channel	• Studio B Productions • Hieroglyphic Productions • Disney Television Animation	Flash/Live Action
Bubble Guppies	• Educational • Musical • Sketch comedy (seasons 1–4) • Fantasy (seasons 5–6)	6 seasons, 129 episodes	• Jonny Belt • Robert Scull	January 24, 2011 – June 30, 2023	• Nickelodeon • Nick Jr. Channel	• Wildbrain Entertainment (season 1) • Nelvana (seasons 2–4) • Jam Filled Toronto (seasons 5–6) • Nickelodeon Animation Studio	CGI
Qumi-Qumi	Comedy	3 seasons, 21 episodes	• Vladimir Ponamarev • Pavel Muntyan • Georgy Vasiliev • Arthur Merkulov • Dmitry Gorbunov • Stan Norden • Alexey Kotenochkin • Vladimir Afanasyev • Alexey Minchenok • Oleg Uzhinov • Natalia Rumyantseva • Alexey Lebedev	March 2011 – 2019	• NTV • STS • 2×2 • Karusel • Mult • Tlum HD • Ryzhy • Multik HD • Ani • TiJi	Toonbox Animation Studio	• Flash (season 1) • CGI (seasons 2–3)
Small Potatoes	• Preschool • Musical	1 season, 26 episodes	Josh Selig	April 18, 2011 – December 25, 2011	• CBeebies (2011–present) • Disney Junior (2011–13)	Little Airplane Productions	Flash/Live action
The Amazing World of Gumball	• Fantasy • Surreal comedy • Slapstick • Black comedy	6 seasons, 240 episodes	Ben Bocquelet	May 3, 2011 – June 24, 2019	Cartoon Network (United States) and UK	• Cartoon Network Development Studio Europe • Studio SOI • Boulder Media Limited (season 1) • Dandelion Studios (season 1)	CGI/Flash/Stop-motion/Traditional/Live-action/Puppetry
Sherlock Yack	Mystery	1 season, 52 episodes	—N/a	May 4, 2011 – March 4, 2012	• France: TF1 • Germany: ZDF and KiKA	• Mondo TV France • ZDF Enterprises	Flash
Voltron Force	• Adventure • Science fiction	1 season, 26 episodes	World Events Productions	June 16, 2011 – April 25, 2012	Nicktoons	• World Events Productions • Classic Media • Kickstart Productions	Traditional
Superbook	• Christian media • Adventure • Science fiction • Fantasy	5 seasons, 68 episodes		September 1, 2011 – May 4, 2021	• Tokyo MX • CBN	• Daysview Digital Network • Toiion Animation Studios • Xentrix Studios	CGI
Jelly Jamm	• Education • Comedy	2 seasons, 77 episodes	• Carlos L. de Rey • Victor M. Lopez • David Cantolla	September 5, 2011 – May 17, 2013	• Cartoonito (pan-European) • Clan (Spain)	• Vodka Capital • 737 SHAKER	CGI
Mike the Knight	• Action • Fantasy • Educational • Preschool	3 seasons, 75 episodes	Alexander Bar	September 8, 2011 – January 13, 2017	• Treehouse TV (Canada) • CBeebies (United Kingdom)	• Nelvana • HIT Entertainment	CGI
Transformers: Rescue Bots	• Science fantasy • Action • Adventure • Superhero	4 seasons, 104 episodes	• Nicole Dubuc • Brian Hohlfeld • Jeff Kline	December 17, 2011 – October 22, 2016	• The Hub / Hub Network (2012–14) • Discovery Family (2014–16)	• Atomic Cartoons (season 1) • Darby Pop Productions (season 1) • Vision Animation (season 2) • Moody Street Productions (season 2) • DHX Media Vancouver (seasons 3–4)	Toon Boom (season 1)/Flash (seasons 2–4)
Fleabag Monkeyface	Toilet humor	1 season, 52 episodes	Knife and Packer	19 December 2011 – 12 September 2012	ITV (CITV)	• Sparky Animation • Impossible Kids • Editude Pictures • Walker Productions	CGI
Doc McStuffins	Preschool	5 seasons, 136 episodes	Chris Nee	March 23, 2012 – April 18, 2020	Disney Junior	Brown Bag Films	CGI/Flash ("The Doc Files" only)
Wild Grinders	• Comedy • Sports	2 seasons, 52 episodes	Rob Dyrdek	April 27, 2012 – February 12, 2015	Nicktoons	• Home Plate Entertainment • Four Down Productions (season 1) • Agogo Media (season 1) • Copernicus Studios (season 1) • Superjacket Productions (season 2) • Top Draw Animation (season 2) • Big Jump Entertainment (season 2) • Telegael	Flash
Mia and Me	Fantasy	4 seasons, 104 episodes	Gerhard Hahn	August 12, 2012 – June 14, 2023	Kika	• Hahn & m4e Productions • Rainbow S.p.A. • March Entertainment (season 1) • Rai Fiction (seasons 1–2)	Live action/CGI
Daniel Tiger's Neighborhood	Educational	7 seasons, 152 episodes	Angela C. Santomero	September 3, 2012 – present	PBS Kids	• Fred Rogers Productions • 9 Story Media Group	Flash (season 1–present)/Toon Boom Harmony (seasons 6–present)
Littlest Pet Shop (2012)	• Comedy • Adventure • Fantasy • Musical	4 seasons, 104 episodes	• Julie McNally Cahill • Tim Cahill	November 10, 2012 – June 4, 2016	Discovery Family	Hasbro Studios	Flash
Oddbods	• Comedy • Satire	4 seasons, 216 episodes	Richard Thomas	January 23, 2013 – December 22, 2024	• Disney Channel (Asia) • CITV/Boomerang (United Kingdom) • Netflix (season 3) • YouTube (season 4 and specials)	One Animation	CGI
Dude, That's My Ghost!	• Animated sitcom • Comedy-horror • Supernatural • Urbran fantasy	1 season, 52 episodes	Jan Van Rijsselberge	February 2 – December 15, 2013	• Orange Cinema Series (France) • Disney XD (United Kingdom)	• Alphanim • Snipple Animation • Cofanim • Backup Films	Flash
Max Steel	• Superhero • Action-adventure • Science fiction	2 seasons, 52 episodes	• Lloyd Goldfine • Gabriel De La Torre	March 25, 2013 – July 29, 2017	• Disney XD (2013) • Netflix (2014)	• Nerd Corps Entertainment • FremantleMedia Enterprises • Mattel Studios • Mattel Playground Productions	CGI
Doki	• Adventure • Comedy	3 seasons, 76 episodes	JBMW Media	April 15, 2013 – July 1, 2019	• Discovery Kids (Latin America) • TVOKids (Canada)	• Nelvana (pilot) • Portfolio Entertainment • PiP Animation Services (seasons 1–2) • Portfolio Animation (season 3) • Discovery Kids Original Productions	Flash
Pac-Man and the Ghostly Adventures	• Science fantasy • Comedy • Action • Adventure	3 seasons, 52 episodes	• Tom Ruegger • Paul Rugg • Avi Arad	June 15, 2013 – May 29, 2015	• Disney XD (United States/Canada) • Tokyo MX (Japan)	• 41 Entertainment • Arad Productions • Bandai Namco Games • OLM Digital • Sprite Animation Studios	CGI
Packages from Planet X	• Science fiction • Adventure • Action	1 season, 26 episodes	Jeff Harter	July 13, 2013 – February 24, 2014	• Disney XD (United States) • Teletoon (Canada)	• DHX Media • American Greetings	Flash
Rabbids Invasion	• Comedy • Slapstick	4 seasons, 104 episodes	Jean-Louis Momus	August 3, 2013 – December 26, 2018	• France 3 (France) • Nickelodeon/Nicktoons (United States)	• Ubisoft Film & Television • TeamTO • Anima (Mission to Mars) • France Télévisions	CGI
Mademoiselle Zazie	• Adventure • Comedy	1 season, 13 episodes		August 24, 2013 – 2014	• France 5	• Cyber Group Studios • Scrawl Studios	CGI
Xiaolin Chronicles	• Martial arts • Adventure • Action • Science fiction comedy	1 season, 26 episodes	Christy Hui	August 26, 2013 – July 1, 2015	• Disney XD (2013–14) • Netflix (2015)	• ActionFliks Media Corporation • Genao Productions	Traditional/CGI
The Day My Butt Went Psycho!	• Adventure • Comedy • Toilet humour	2 seasons, 40 episodes	Mark Steinberg	September 21, 2013 – June 30, 2015	• Teletoon (Canada) • Nine Network (Australia) • Netflix (season 2)	• Nelvana • Studio Moshi • Brain Bender Pty Ltd.	Flash
Julius Jr.	Science fiction	2 seasons, 52 episodes	• Paul Brown • Chris Labonte	September 29, 2013 – August 9, 2015	Nick Jr. Channel	• Saban Brands • BrainPower Studio	Flash
Peg + Cat	Educational	2 seasons, 63 episodes	• Jennifer Oxley • Billy Aronson	October 7, 2013 – April 23, 2018	PBS Kids	• Feline Features, LLC • Fred Rogers Productions • 9 Story Media Group • 9 ate 7 Productions	Flash
Sabrina: Secrets of a Teenage Witch	• Fantasy • Comedy • Magical girl	1 season, 26 episodes	• George Gladir • Dan DeCarlo	October 12, 2013 – June 7, 2014	Hub Network	• Riverdale Productions • MoonScoop • DSK Group • Laughing Lion • Telegael Teoranta • Splash Entertainment	CGI
Lassie	• Comedy-drama • Adventure	2 seasons, 52 episodes	Eric Knight	2014 – 2020	• TF1 • Télétoon+ • ZDF • KIKA	• Superprod Animation • ZDF Enterprises • DQ Entertainment (season 1)	Traditional (season 1)/CGI (season 2)
Mind Blowing Breakthroughs	• Comedy-drama • Action • Educational	3 seasons, 78 episodes		February 1, 2014 – present	• Astro TVIQ • Da Vinci Kids • Kids Central	• Educational Broadcasting System • Grafizix Co. Ltd • Astrolab Motion	Flash
Mixels	• Comedy • Fantasy	2 seasons, 31 episodes	• John Fang • David P. Smith	February 12, 2014 – October 1, 2016	Cartoon Network	• The Lego Group • Cartoon Network Studios	Flash; Traditional (season 2)
The Doozers	Animated series	2 seasons, 72 episodes		April 25, 2014 – May 25, 2018	Hulu	• The Jim Henson Company • DHX Media	CGI
Super Wings	• Children's • Educational • Preschool • Adventure • Mecha	10 seasons, 424 episodes	Gil Hoon Jung	September 1, 2014 – present	Sprout / Universal Kids	• FunnyFlux Entertainment • Qianqi Animation (season 1) • Alpha Group (seasons 2–present) Little Airplane Productions (seasons 1–3) • Educational Broadcasting System	CGI
Kate & Mim-Mim	• Adventure • Children's • Fantasy	2 seasons, 47 episodes	• Scott Stewart • Julie Stewart	September 1, 2014 – March 23, 2018	• Knowledge Kids • BBC Kids • CBeebies (United Kingdom)	• FremantleMedia Kids & Family Entertainment • Nerd Corps Entertainment • DHX Studios	CGI
Kit and Kate	• Preschool • Educational	2 seasons, 104 episodes	• Vladimir Ponomarev • Michael Mennies • Mike de Sève	September 1, 2014 – December 27, 2019	Carousel	• Toonbox • TBI Bank	Flash
Blaze and the Monster Machines	• Preschool • Action • Science fiction • Musical • Adventure • Comedy	9 seasons, 180 episodes	• Jeff Borkin • Ellen Martin	October 13, 2014 – December 1, 2025	Nickelodeon	• Nerd Corps Entertainment (season 1) • WildBrain Studios (seasons 2–9) • Nickelodeon Animation Studio	CGI
Sonic Boom	• Animated sitcom •Action comedy	2 seasons, 104 episodes	• Evan Baily • Donna Friedman Meir • Sandrine Nguyen	November 8, 2014 – November 18, 2017	• Cartoon Network • Boomerang	• Sega of America, Inc. • Technicolor Animation Productions • Lagardère Thématiques • Jeunesse TV	CGI
Peanuts	Comedy	1 season, 37 episodes	Charles M. Schulz	November 9, 2014 – December 24, 2016	• France 3 • Cartoon Network • Boomerang	• Dall'Angelo Pictures • Normaal Animation • Peanuts Worldwide	Flash
Alvinnn!!! and the Chipmunks	• Comedy • Musical	5 seasons, 130 episodes	Janice Karman	March 30, 2015 – March 4, 2023	• M6 • Nickelodeon	• Bagdasarian Productions • Technicolor Animation Productions	CGI
Pirate Express	• Action • Comedy • Adventure	1 season, 26 episodes	• Mathieu DeLaPorte • Boris Guillitoeu • Alexis Bacci-Leville • Romain Van Liemt • Alexandre De La Patelliérre	April 26, 2015 – April 30, 2015	• Teletoon (Canada) • 9Go! (Australia)	• Atomic Cartoons • Sticky Pictures	Flash
Fresh Beat Band of Spies	• Preschool • Action • Adventure • Musical • Science fiction	1 season, 20 episodes	• Nadine van der Velde • Scott Kraft	June 15, 2015 – January 22, 2016	Nick Jr. Channel	• Nickelodeon Animation Studio • 6 Point Harness • Nelvana Limited	Flash
Shimmer and Shine	• Preschool • Fantasy • Magical girl • Musical	4 seasons, 86 episodes	Farnaz Esnaashari-Charmatz	August 24, 2015 – February 9, 2020	• Nickelodeon • Nick Jr. Channel	• Guru Studio • Xentrix Studios (seasons 2–4) • Nickelodeon Animation Studio	• Flash (season 1) • CGI (seasons 2–4)
Da Jammies	• Comedy • Musical	1 season, 13 episodes	• Aulsondro "Novelist" Hamilton • William "Dolla" Chapman II	August 31, 2015	Netflix	• Toon Farm Animation LLC. • Gama Entertainment • Cosmic Toast	CGI
Miraculous: Tales of Ladybug & Cat Noir	• Adventure • Action • Romance • Superhero • Magical girl • Comedy-drama	7 seasons, 159 episodes	Thomas Astruc	September 1, 2015 – present	• TF1 (France) • EBS 1 (South Korea, season 1) • Disney Channel EMEA (seasons 2–present) • Super! (seasons 2–5) • Gloob (seasons 3–present) • Télé-Québec (seasons 6–present) • TFX (2024–present)	• Zagtoon • Method Animation (seasons 1–5) • Miraculous Corp. (seasons 6–present) • Toei Animation (seasons 1–5) • Toei Animation Europe S.A.S. (seasons 1–5) • SAMG Animation (seasons 1–3) • SK Broadband (seasons 1–3) • De Agostini Editore (seasons 2–5) • Gravity Animation, Inc. (season 5) • KidsMe S.r.l. (seasons 6–present)	CGI
Descendants: Wicked World	• Fantasy • Comedy	1 season, 20 episodes	• Jennifer Magee-Cook • Aliki Theofilopoulos	September 18, 2015 – July 21, 2017	Disney Channel	• Bad Angels Productions • 5678 Productions • Disney Television Animation	CGI
PJ Masks	• Action • Superhero • Science fiction	6 seasons, 151 episodes	Romuald Racioppo	September 18, 2015 – April 15, 2024	• France 5 (France) • Disney Junior (US/Canada/international)	• Hasbro Entertainment • Frog Box Productions • TeamTO	CGI
Nina's World	• Children's television series • Educational • Comedy • Adventure • Fantasy • Musical	2 seasons, 52 episodes	• Andrew Beecham • Lisa O'Brien	September 26, 2015 – October 21, 2018	Sprout / Universal Kids	Pipeline Studios	Flash
Danger Mouse (2015)	• Action • Spy-fi • Comedy • Adventure	2 seasons, 99 episodes	Brian Cosgrove	September 28, 2015 – March 5, 2019	CBBC	• FremantleMedia Kids & Family Entertainment (2015–17) • Boulder Media • Boat Rocker Media • CBBC Production	Toon Boom Harmony
Miffy's Adventures Big and Small	Children's television series	3 seasons, 104 episodes	Dick Bruna	October 2, 2015 – June 16, 2019	KRO-NCRV	• Blue Zoo Animation Studio • Mercis BV	CGI
Robin Hood: Mischief in Sherwood	Fantasy	4 seasons, 208 episodes		October 19, 2015 – 2024	• TF1 (France) • Disney Channel (France, seasons 1–2) • ZDF (Germany) • DeA Kids (Italy, season 1)	• Method Animation • ZDF Studios • Fabrique D'Images (season 1) • De Agostini Editore (season 1) • DQ Entertainment (seasons 1–2) • KidsMe S.r.l. (season 3)	CGI
Scream Street	• Children's • Comedy horror • Stop motion animation	3 seasons, 52 episodes	Tommy Donbavand	October 21, 2015 – present	• BBC • CBBC	• Factory • Coolabi Productions • ZDF Enterprises • Ingenious Media	Stop motion
Popples (2015)		3 seasons, 26 episodes		October 30, 2015 – July 24, 2016	Netflix	• Saban Brands • Method Animation • Zagtoon • Nexus Factory • Umedia • DQ Entertainment International	CGI
Molang	• Animated sitcom • Comedy • Adventure	6 seasons, 321 episodes	• Hye-Ji Yoon • Millimages	November 2, 2015 – 2022	• Piwi+ • Canal+ Family • TF1 • Televisió de Catalunya (Spain, season 1)	Millimages • Petit K World (seasons 1–2) • Teidees Audiovisuals (season 1)	Flash
If You Give a Mouse a Cookie	Comedy	2 seasons, 53 episodes		November 4, 2015 – October 14, 2021	Amazon Video	• Mercury Filmworks • Kaboaa! • Amazon Studios	Flash
Blazing Team: Masters of Yo Kwon Do	• Action • Adventure • Sports	4 seasons, 42 episodes		November 13, 2015 – September 9, 2017	Discovery Family	• Guangdong Alpha Animation & Culture • Shenzhen Sun Animation Co. Ltd. • Shenzhen Charm Animation Co. Ltd. • Nexson Audio-Visual Production Studio	Flash
Nature Cat	Educational	5 seasons, 98 episodes	• Adam Rudman • David Rudman • Todd Hannert	November 25, 2015 – April 3, 2025	PBS Kids	• Spiffy Pictures • WTTW Chicago • 9 Story Media Group (seasons 1–3) • Yowza! Animation (seasons 4–5)	Flash
Sunny Bunnies	• Comedy • Slapstick • Fantasy	10 seasons, 256 episodes	• Andrew Ledenev • Andrew Tolkachev • Sergey Gashnikov	December 6, 2015 – present	• YouTube (seasons 2–present) • Disney Channel (Russia) • Channel 5 (United Kingdom)	• Digital Light Animation Studios (seasons 1–6) • Animation Café (seasons 7–present)	CGI
The Deep	• Action • Adventure • Science fiction • Comedy drama	4 seasons, 65 episodes	• Tom Taylor • James Brouwer	December 7, 2015 – July 19, 2022	• WildBrainTV • 7two • CBBC	• A Stark Production • Technicolor (seasons 1–3) • Nerd Corps Entertainment (season 1) • WildBrain Studios (seasons 2–4) • Infinite Studios (season 4) • BBC Children's Productions (season 4)	CGI
Bottersnikes & Gumbles	• Comedy • Slapstick comedy • Surreal comedy • Children's television series	1 season, 52 episodes		December 18, 2015 – 2017	• Netflix • 7two • CBBC	• Cake Entertainment • Mighty Nice • Cheeky Little Media • Kickstart Entertainment • Seven Productions • CBBC • Netflix Studios	CGI
Zig and Zag	• Comedy • Animated sitcom	1 season, 26 episodes	• Ciaran Morrison • Mick O'Hara	March 1, 2016 – February 22, 2017	• CBBC • RTÉjr	Double Z Enterprises • Flickerpix • JAM Media	Flash
Noddy, Toyland Detective		2 seasons, 104 episodes	• Heath Kenny • Myles McLeod	March 26, 2016 – March 22, 2020	• Sprout/Universal Kids (United States) • France 5 (France)	• Gaumont Animation • DreamWorks Animation Television	CGI
Kong: King of the Apes	• Adventure • Drama • Science fantasy	2 seasons, 23 episodes	• Avi Arad • Allen Bohbot	April 15, 2016 – May 4, 2018	Netflix	• Arad Animation • 41 Entertainment • OLM, Digital • Sprite Animation Studios • ICON Creative Studio (Season 2)	CGI
Counterfeit Cat	• Comedy • Adventure • Surreal comedy • Science fiction	1 season, 52 episodes	Andrew Lavery	May 12, 2016 – January 22, 2017	• Disney XD (United States and United Kingdom) • Teletoon (Canada)	• Wildseed Kids • Tricon Kids & Family • Aardman Animations • Atomic Cartoons	Flash
Atomic Puppet	Superhero	1 season, 26 episodes	• Mark Drop • Jerry Leibowitz	July 18, 2016 – February 21, 2017	• Teletoon • France 4 • Disney XD	• Mercury Filmworks • French VFX • Technicolor • Gaumont Animation	Flash
My Knight and Me	• Fantasy • Comedy	1 season, 52 episodes	Joeri Christiaen	August 28, 2016 – June 29, 2017	• OUFtivi • Télétoon+ • Canal+ Family	• TeamTO • Thuristar	CGI
Kulipari	• Action • Adventure • Comedy-drama • Fantasy	3 seasons, 26 episodes	Trevor Pryce	September 2, 2016 – July 28, 2024	• Netflix (seasons 1–2) • Hulu (season 3)	• The Outlook Company • Telegael Teoranta • Splash Entertainment	Flash
Ranger Rob	• Comedy • Fantasy	3 seasons, 66 episodes	Alexander Bar	September 5, 2016 – June 13, 2021	• Treehouse TV (Canada) • Tiny Pop (UK) • Universal Kids/UniMás (USA) • Ici Radio-Canada Télé (Canada)	• Studio Liddell • Nelvana	CGI
Dot.	• Adventure • Comedy • Educational	2 seasons, 78 episodes	Randi Zuckerberg	September 6, 2016 – October 27, 2018	• Sprout / Universal Kids (United States) • CBC Kids (Canada)	• Industrial Brothers • The Jim Henson Company	Flash
The ZhuZhus	Comedy	2 seasons, 23 episodes	Hugh Duffy	September 12, 2016 – August 22, 2017	Disney Channel	• Corus Entertainment • Nelvana	Flash
P. King Duckling	• Adventure • Comedy	1 season, 52 episodes	Josh Selig	November 7, 2016 – May 11, 2017	Disney Junior	• UYoung • Little Airplane Productions	Flash
Luna Petunia		5 seasons, 33 episodes	Dave Thomas	December 9, 2016 – July 21, 2018	Netflix	• Cirque du Soleil • Saban Brands • BrainPower Studio	CGI
Tarzan and Jane	• Adventure • Drama • Science fantasy	2 seasons, 13 episodes	Avi Arad	January 6, 2017 – October 12, 2018	Netflix	• Arad Animation • 41 Entertainment • Arc Productions	CGI
Cloudy with a Chance of Meatballs	• Comic science fiction • Sci-fi	2 seasons, 104 episodes	• Mark Evestaff • Alex Galatis	February 20, 2017 – June 30, 2018	• YTV (Canada) • Cartoon Network (United States)	• Sony Pictures Animation • Corus Entertainment • WildBrain Studios	Toon Boom
Pat the Dog	• Comedy • Slapstick	2 seasons, 145 episodes	Patrick Ermosilla	April 3, 2017 – November 27, 2022	• Télétoon+/Canal+ Family (France) • Rai Gulp (Italy) • La Trois/OUFtivi/Ketnet (Belgium)	• Superprod Studio • Superprod Animation • Animoka Studios • Toon Factory • Grid Animation • Rai Fiction	CGI
Paap-O-Meter	Horror-comedy	6 seasons, 173 episodes		April 14, 2017 – 2020	• Sony YAY! (India) • YTV (Canada)	• Ssoftoons • Nelvana	CGI
The Ollie & Moon Show	Comedy	2 seasons, 52 episodes	Diane Kredensor	May 27, 2017 – 2021	Universal Kids	• Cottonwood Media • Kaibou Studio IX • TTK Montréal	Flash
Hotel Transylvania: The Series	Comedy horror	2 seasons, 52 episodes	Mark Steinberg	June 25, 2017 – October 29, 2020	• Teletoon (Canada) • Disney Channel (United States)	• Sony Pictures Animation • Corus Entertainment • Nelvana	Toon Boom
Welcome to the Wayne	• Adventure • Mystery • Science fantasy • Urban fantasy • Comedy • Action	2 seasons, 30 episodes	Billy Lopez	July 24, 2017 – May 31, 2019	• Nickelodeon (2017) • Nicktoons (2018–19)	• Yowza! Animation • Nickelodeon Animation Studio	Flash
True and the Rainbow Kingdom	• Action • Adventure • Comedy • Fantasy • Musical	3 seasons, 29 episodes	• Jeff Borkin • Samuel Borkson • Arturo Sandoval III • Bill Schultz	August 11, 2017 – August 30, 2019	Netflix	• Home Plate Entertainment • Guru Studio	CGI
Mysticons	• Action • Fantasy	2 seasons, 40 episodes	Sean Jara	August 28, 2017 – September 15, 2018	• YTV (Canada) • Nickelodeon (United States)	• Topps Animation • Corus Entertainment • Nelvana	Flash
The Magic School Bus Rides Again	• Children's television series • Educational	3 seasons, 30 episodes		September 29, 2017 – November 9, 2021	Netflix	• Scholastic Entertainment • 9 Story Media Group • Brown Bag Films	Flash
Vampirina	• Comedy horror • Halloween • Dark fantasy • Musical • Supernatural • Science fiction	3 seasons, 75 episodes	Chris Nee	October 1, 2017 – June 28, 2021	Disney Junior	Brown Bag Films	CGI
Pablo	Children's television	2 seasons, 105 episodes	Grainne McGuinness	October 2, 2017 – June 11, 2020	• CBeebies • RTÉjr	• Paper Owl Films • Kavaleer Productions • Ingenious Media • Cake Entertainment	Flash
Super Monsters		3 seasons, 22 episodes	Avi Arad	October 13, 2017 – June 1, 2021	Netflix	• Arad Animation (seasons 1–2) • ICON Creative Studio • 41 Entertainment • Aardman Animations	CGI
Oswaldo	• Comedy • Adventure	4 seasons, 52 episodes	Pedro Eboli	October 11, 2017 – January 27, 2021	• Cartoon Network • TV Cultura	• Birdo Studio • Symbiosys Entertainment (seasons 2–4)	Flash
Unikitty!	• Action • Adventure • Comedy	3 seasons, 104 episodes		October 27, 2017 – August 27, 2020	Cartoon Network	• The Lego Group • Warner Bros. Animation	Flash
Llama Llama	Animation	2 seasons, 25 episodes	• Anna Dewdney • Reed Duncan • Jane Startz	January 26, 2018 – November 15, 2019	Netflix	Genius Brands	Flash
Pinkalicious & Peterrific	• Educational • Fantasy	7 seasons, 81 episodes		February 19, 2018 – present	PBS Kids	• Sixteen South • WGBH	Flash
Littlest Pet Shop: A World of Our Own	• Comedy • Adventure • Fantasy	1 season, 52 episodes	Tim Maile and Douglas Tuber	April 14, 2018 – January 26, 2019	Discovery Family	• Boulder Media Limited • Allspark Animation	Flash
Polly Pocket	• Comedy • Fantasy • Science fiction • Action • Adventure	6 seasons, 155 episodes	• Shea Fontana • Stephanie Betts • Shaleen Sangha • Christopher Keenan • Carlos Ramos	July 8, 2018 – October 19, 2025	• Family Channel (Canada) • Universal Kids (United States, seasons 1−2) • Netflix (United States, seasons 2−5) • Amazon Prime Video (United States, season 6)	• Mattel • WildBrain Studios	Flash
Cupcake & Dino: General Services	• Adventure • Comedy	2 seasons, 26 episodes	Pedro Eboli	July 27, 2018 – May 3, 2019	• Teletoon • Disney XD • Netflix	• Birdo Studio • Entertainment One • Corus Entertainment	Flash
Mega Man: Fully Charged	• Action • Adventure • Science fantasy • Superhero	1 season, 52 episodes	• Man of Action • Dentsu Entertainment USA	August 5, 2018 – May 23, 2019	• Cartoon Network • Family Chrgd	• Capcom • Dentsu Entertainment USA • DHX Media • DHX Studios Vancouver	CGI
Esme & Roy	• Comedy • Musical • Fantasy	2 seasons, 52 episodes	• Dustin Ferrer • Amy Steinberg	August 18, 2018 – February 4, 2021	• HBO (season 1) • HBO Max (season 2) • PBS Kids • Treehouse TV	• Sesame Workshop • Nelvana	Toon Boom
Transformers: Cyberverse	• Action • Adventure • Science fiction • Comedy drama	4 seasons, 64 episodes		August 27, 2018 – December 22, 2021	• Cartoon Network • Netflix • YouTube	• Boulder Media Limited • Allspark Animation • Entertainment One	CGI
Total DramaRama	Surreal comedy	3 seasons, 153 episodes	• Jennifer Pertsch • Tom McGillis	September 1, 2018 – April 15, 2023	• Teletoon (Canada) • Cartoon Network (United States)	• Fresh TV • Corus Entertainment • Cartoon Network	Flash
Go Away, Unicorn!	• Comedy • Fantasy	1 season, 26 episodes	Emily Mullock	September 7, 2018 – June 8, 2019	• YTV (Canada) • Disney Channel (United States)	• Sonar Entertainment • Nelvana	Flash/Toon Boom
The Dragon Prince	• Action • Adventure • Comedy-drama • Fantasy	7 seasons, 63 episodes	• Aaron Ehasz • Justin Richmond	September 14, 2018 – December 19, 2024	Netflix	• Wonderstorm • MWM • Bardel Entertainment	CGI
Hilda	• Adventure • Comedy-drama • Fantasy	3 seasons, 34 episodes	Luke Pearson	September 21, 2018 – December 7, 2023	Netflix	• Atomic Cartoons (season 1) • Mercury Filmworks • Nobrow Press (season 1) • Flying Eye Books (seasons 2–3) • Silvergate Media	Flash
Space Chickens in Space	• Science fiction • Surreal comedy	1 season, 26 episodes	• José C. García de Letona • Rita Street	September 30, 2018 – June 9, 2019	9Go! (Australia) • Disney XD	• Ánima Estudios • Cake Entertainment • Studio Moshi • Gingerbread Animation • Ingenious Media	Traditional/Flash
Rainbow Rangers	• Magical girl • Science fiction • Action • Adventure • Comedy	3 seasons, 62 episodes	• Rob Minkoff • Shane Morris • Tim Mansfield • Elise Allen	November 5, 2018 – April 15, 2022	Nick Jr. Channel	• Genius Brands • Telegael	• CGI (seasons 1–2) • Flash (season 3)
Motown Magic	Urban fantasy	2 seasons, 51 episodes	Josh Wakely	November 20, 2018 – June 28, 2019	Netflix		CGI
Let's Go Luna!	• Children's television series • Educational • Comedy • Musical	2 seasons, 65 episodes	Joe Murray	November 21, 2018 – November 18, 2022	PBS Kids	• Brown Bag Films • 9 Story Media Group • Joe Murray Productions (uncredited)	Flash
Transformers: Rescue Bots Academy	• Comedy • Science fiction • Superhero	2 seasons, 104 episodes	Nicole Dubuc	December 8, 2018 – June 5, 2021	Discovery Family	• Boulder Media Limited • Allspark Animation	Flash
Gigantosaurus	Educational	3 seasons, 78 episodes	• Franck Salomé • Nicolas Sedel • Fernando Worcel	January 18, 2019 – present	France 5	• Cyber Group Studios (2019–2025) • Kaibou • Blue Spirit Studio	CGI
Care Bears: Unlock the Magic	• Adventure • Comedy • Fantasy	1 season, 49 episodes		February 1, 2019 – November 2, 2024	Boomerang	• Cloudco Entertainment • Copernicus Studios	Flash
Moominvalley	Family drama	4 seasons, 52 episodes	• Marika Makaroff • Steve Box	February 25, 2019 – October 26, 2024	• Yle TV2 • Yle Teema & Fem • Sky One • Sky Showcase	Gutsy Animations	CGI
Mighty Mike	• Comedy • Slapstick	1 season, 26 episodes	Guillaume Hellouin	March 14, 2019 – 2020	• France 3 • Ici Radio-Canada Télé • Family Channel	• TeamTO • Digital Dimension	CGI
Lego City Adventures	Comedy	4 seasons, 65 episodes		June 22, 2019 – November 22, 2022	• Nickelodeon • Netflix • YouTube	• Passion Paris • Axis Studios • The Lego Group • Circus • Circus Animation	CGI
Ricky Zoom	• Comedy • Adventure	2 seasons, 52 episodes	Alexander Bar	June 28, 2019 – 2021	• Gulli • RAI • Youku Kids	• Entertainment One • TeamTO • Youku Kids • Frog Box • Rai Ragazzi • Maga Animation Studio	CGI
Lego Jurassic World: Legend of Isla Nublar	• Action • Adventure • Comic science fiction • Science fantasy	1 season, 15 episodes	• Adam Beechen • Jason Cosler • Lars Danielsen • David Shayne	July 6, 2019 – August 30, 2020	• Family Channel • Nickelodeon	• Atomic Cartoons • LEGO	CGI
Molly of Denali	Educational	4 seasons, 85 episodes	• Dorothea Gillim • Kathy Waugh	July 15, 2019 – present	PBS Kids	• CBC Kids • WGBH	Flash
Norman Picklestripes	• Fantasy • Musical • Comedy	1 season, 23 episodes	• Alex Rockwell • Judy Rothman Rofé	July 27, 2019 – June 8, 2021	Universal Kids	Factory	Stop-motion
Squish	Comedy	1 season, 52 episodes	John Derevlany	September 1, 2019 – February 12, 2020	• Gulli • Canal J	• Cottonwood Media • Planeta Junior	Flash
The Last Kids on Earth	• Apocalyptic fiction • Adventure • Comedy	3 seasons, 21 episodes		September 17, 2019 – April 6, 2021	Netflix	• Atomic Cartoons • Koko Productions Inc. •Cyber Group Studios	Flash
Carmen Sandiego	• Action-adventure • Comedy • Mystery-drama • Educational	4 seasons, 32 episodes	Duane Capizzi	October 1, 2019 – January 15, 2021	Netflix	• WildBrain Studios • HMH Productions • I Can & I Will Productions	Flash
Boy Girl Dog Cat Mouse Cheese	• Comedy • Surreal comedy • Adventure	3 seasons, 156 episodes	• Jeff Harter • Cloudco Entertainment	October 31, 2019 – November 20, 2024	• CBBC (United Kingdom) • Gulli (France) • Canal J (France) • Disney Channel (France, season 3) • RTÉ2 (TRTÉ, Ireland) • RTÉjr (Ireland) • DeA Kids (Italy) • Super RTL (Germany, season 3)	• Cloudco Entertainment • Watch Next Media • Kavaleer Productions	Flash
Snoopy in Space		2 seasons, 24 episodes	Mark Evestaff • Betsy Walters	November 1, 2019 – November 12, 2021	Apple TV+	• DHX Media • Peanuts Worldwide • Schulz Studio	Flash
Blue's Clues & You!	Educational	5 seasons, 90 episodes	• Traci Paige Johnson • Todd Kessler • Angela C. Santomero	November 11, 2019 – September 27, 2024	• Nickelodeon • Nick Jr. Channel	• Brown Bag Films • 9 Story Media Group • Nickelodeon Animation Studio	CGI/Live-action/Flash
Xavier Riddle and the Secret Museum	• Children's television series • Educational • Action–adventure • Science fiction	2 seasons, 60 episodes	Todd Grimes	November 11, 2019 – present	PBS Kids	• Brown Bag Films • 9 Story Media Group	Flash
Clifford the Big Red Dog	Educational	3 seasons, 39 episodes		December 6, 2019 – February 12, 2021	• Amazon Prime Video • PBS Kids	• 100 Chickens Productions • Brown Bag Films Toronto • 9 Story Media Group • Scholastic Entertainment • Amazon Studios	Flash
Garfield Originals	• Comedy • Slapstick	1 season, 24 episodes	• Philippe Vidal • Jim Davis	December 6, 2019 – June 17, 2020	• France 3 • Nick.com	• Dargaud Media • Paws, Inc.	Flash
The Adventures of Paddington	Comedy	3 seasons, 117 episodes	• Jon Foster • James Lamont	December 20, 2019 – February 21, 2025	• Gulli • M6 • Piwi+ • Nick Jr. • 5	• Heyday Films • StudioCanal • Blue Zoo Animation Studio • Superprod Studio	CGI

== See also ==
- List of children's animated films
