= Mr. Freeman =

2009 Russian web series

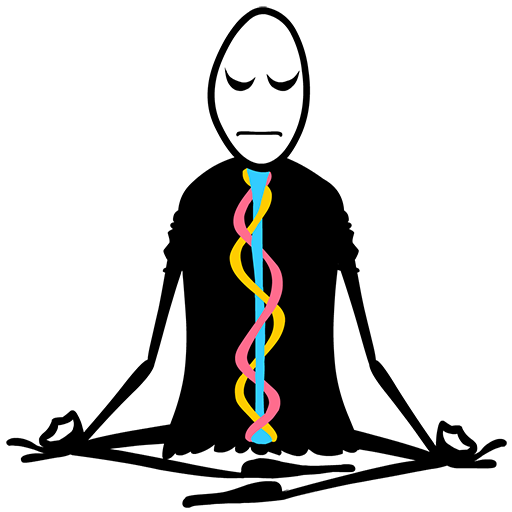
- Mr. Freeman
- Genre: Arthouse; Philosophy
- Directed by: Vladimir Ponomarev
- Voices of: Vadim Demchog, Scott Greer, Mahdi Ghambari
- Composer: Alexey Prosvirnin
- Country of origin: Russia
- Original language: Russian
- No. of seasons: 2
- No. of episodes: 36

Production
- Producer: Pavel Muntyan
- Running time: ≈ 3 minutes
- Production company: Toonbox

Original release
- Network: YouTube; 2×2
- Release: September 21, 2009 – August 6, 2026

Mr. Freeman is a Russian animated web series named after its main character. The series appeared on YouTube on September 21, 2009 and got considerable popularity in Runet. The main content of the series is monologues which, in a harsh manner, criticize the lifestyle of the modern everyman. As of August 2026, there are 36 episodes published, with a total of 42 uploads to the channel. The total number of views is more than 76 million.

The first five episodes were dubbed by the Russian actor Vadim Demchog. On November 14, 2010, Demchog officially announced his immediate relation to the project. After that, production of new episodes temporarily ceased, but on January 11, 2011 a new video was released. Vadim Demchog resumed dubbing the series with the episode "Me?"

It is known that the animator Pavel Muntyan worked on the first series.

== General synopsis and subject ==
The animated series contains many symbols and hints. For example, Freeman may appear as a shape containing the stereotypical traits of some specific individuals or social groups (for example, while saying "I've placed everything under my will", Freeman is standing on a pedestal in a cap-cornered hat, holding his hand at the chest level). There are also hidden frames in the series, which contain elements of a larger image. In addition, there are details, insignificant at first glance, such as numbers 21.12.12 into which the ECG transforms in the first episode, which are the estimated date of completion of the current era according to the Maya calendar. These and many other details nourish many versions about the identity of Freeman and his goals.

== List of episodes ==
Part #	Date	Original tagline (in Russian)	Translated tagline	Subtitles available	Dubbings available	Link
00	September 21, 2009	А ты уверен в том, кто ты такой, и что ты существуешь?	Are you sure who you are and that you exist?	Russian, English, German, Greek, Hebrew	Russian, English, Ukrainian, Spanish, Italian, Albanian, Persian	Part 00 on YouTube
64	October 6, 2009	Где угодно и когда угодно...	Anywhere and anytime...	Russian, English, Greek, Hebrew	Russian, English, Ukrainian, Spanish, Italian, Albanian, Persian	Part 64 on YouTube
63	October 21, 2009	Ты слишком блондин!	You are too blond!	Russian, English, Greek, Hebrew	Russian, English, Ukrainian, Spanish, Italian, Albanian, Persian	Part 63 on YouTube
03	November 17, 2009	Продамся дорого	Sell myself expensive	English, Greek, Hebrew	Russian, English, Ukrainian, Spanish, Italian, Albanian, Persian	Part 03 on YouTube
04	December 20, 2009	«Плодитесь, коровы, жизнь коротка» © ГГМ	"Go forth and multiply, cows, life is short" © GGM	English, Greek, Hebrew	Russian, English, Ukrainian, Spanish, Italian, Albanian, Persian	Part 04 on YouTube
05	December 30, 2009	Новый год?	New Year?	English, Greek, Hebrew	Russian, English, Ukrainian, Spanish, Albanian, Persian	Part 05 on YouTube
06	February 15, 2010	Местоимение Я пишется с большой буквы!	"I" is spelled with a capital Letter	Russian, English, Greek, Hebrew	Russian, English, Ukrainian, Spanish, Persian	Part 06 on YouTube
58	February 27, 2010	Что стало с твоей мечтой?	What has happened to your dream?	English, Greek, Hebrew	Russian, English, Ukrainian, Spanish, Persian	Part 58 on YouTube
57	March 22, 2010	Что из себя представляют твои знания?	What is your knowledge?	English, Greek, Hebrew	Russian, English, Ukrainian, Persian	Part 57 on YouTube
49	March 30, 2010	Глубокое погружение. Итак, начнем...	Deep immersion. Let's start...	English, Greek, Hebrew	Russian, English, Ukrainian, Persian	Part 49 on YouTube
24	July 7, 2010	Что есть ваш бог?	What is your god?	English, Greek, Hebrew	Russian, English, Ukrainian, Perisan	Part 24 on YouTube
32	September 20, 2010	Раз в тысячу лет	Once in a thousand years	English, Greek, Hebrew	Russian, English, Ukrainian, Persian	Part 32 on YouTube
40	January 11, 2011	Здравствуй, социальная шизофрения!	Welcome to the social schizophrenia!	English, Greek, Hebrew	Russian, English, Ukrainian, Persian	Part 40 on YouTube
48	January 31, 2011	Я?	Me?	English, Greek, Hebrew	Russian, English, Ukrainian, Persian	Part 48 on YouTube
09	June 28, 2011	И чо?	So what?	English, Greek, Hebrew	Russian, English, Ukrainian, Persian	Part 09 on YouTube
01	October 11, 2011	Открытое письмо Президенту	An open letter to the President	Greek	Russian, English, Ukrainian, Persian	Part 01 on YouTube
02	November 10, 2011	А ты игрок?	Are you a gambler?	English, Greek, Hebrew	Russian, English, Ukrainian, Persian	Part 02 on YouTube
62	March 6, 2012	Обратного пути уже нет!	There is no return!	Russian, English, Greek, Hebrew	Russian, English, Ukrainian, Persian	Part 62 on YouTube
61	August 16, 2012	Мантра: Чёрный Бог и Белый Бог	Mantra: Black God and White God	English, Greek, Hebrew	Russian, English, Ukrainian, Persian	Part 61 on YouTube
60	June 3, 2014	Покупательная способность	Purchasing ability	Russian, English, Greek	Russian, English, Ukrainian, Persian	Part 60 on YouTube
59	May 18, 2017	Совесть	Conscience	Russian, English, French, Greek, Polish	Russian, English, Ukrainian, Persian	Part 59 on YouTube
07	March 14, 2018	Ода	Ode	Russian, English, Greek	Russian, English	Part 07 on YouTube
08	August 16, 2019	Оскорблять меня весело и безопасно!	Offending me is funny and safe!	Russian, English, Greek	Russian, English	Part 08 on YouTube
16	August 6, 2026	TBA	TBA	Russian, English	Russian, English	Part 16 on YouTube

=== Video questions ===
Part #	Date	Original tagline (in Russian)	Translated tagline	Link
15-001	August 2, 2011	Какая валюта самая главная?	Which currency is the most important?	15-001 on YouTube
15-823	August 9, 2011	А кто ты на самом деле?	Who you really are?	15-823 on YouTube
15-821	August 16, 2011	Кто из вас никогда не брал чужого?	Which one of you has never stolen?	15-821 on YouTube
15-809	August 23, 2011	А ты замечаешь перемены?	Do you notice the changes?	15-809 on YouTube
15-811	August 30, 2011	А ты мне веришь?	Do you trust me?	15-811 on YouTube
15-797	September 6, 2011	Осознание своего рабства — первый шаг к свободе!	Recognition of your own slavery is the first step towards freedom!	15-797 on YouTube
15-019	September 13, 2011	Проведём эксперимент?	Let's run an experiment?	15-019 on YouTube
15-029	September 20, 2011	А вы рожать собираетесь?	Are you going to give birth?	15-029 on YouTube
15-313	September 27, 2011	А чем балуешься ты?	What do you indulge in?	15-313 on YouTube
15-031	October 4, 2011	А ты хочешь чтобы Я стал богатым?	Do you want me to become rich?	15-031 on YouTube

=== Other appearances ===
Date	Original tagline (in Russian)	Translated tagline	Link
June 23, 2010	Mr. Freeman — выступление на Трансперсональном Конгрессе 2010	Mr. Freeman on 17th International Transpersonal Conference 2010	Mr. Freeman on 17th International Transpersonal Conference on Vimeo
March 31, 2011	MF-walking on by	MF-walking on by	MF-walking on by on Vimeo
August 12, 2012	Монолог с презентации 12 августа 2012	Mr. Freeman monologue presentation 12 August 2012	(audio) Mr. Freeman monologue presentation 12 August 2012
December 21, 2012	00:00:00	00:00:00	00:00:00 on YouTube
April 22, 2018	MF Ode, Making Of	MF Ode, Making Of	MF Ode, Making Of on YouTube

== Awards ==
- On April 15, 2010 in Berlin at the international Weblog competition The Best of Blogs the blog "Mr. Freeman" was voted Best Videoblog.

== See also ==
- Pattern Recognition by William Gibson
