= Vadim Demchog =

Russian actor

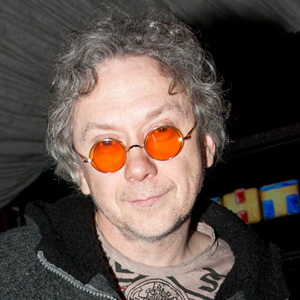
- Demchog in 2013
- Born: Vadim Viktorovich Menshikh; 13 March 1963 (age 62); Narva, Estonian SSR, Soviet Union
- Occupations: Actor; screenwriter; director; radio broadcaster; writer
- Years active: 1985–present

Vadim Viktorovich Demchog (Russian: Вади́м Ви́кторович Демчо́г; born Menshikh (Russian: Меньши́х), born 13 March 1963) is a Russian theater and film actor, candidate of psychological sciences, teacher, creator of author projects on radio, television, the Internet and in the theater. He gained fame as a host of Frankie Show on the Silver Rain Radio. The author of more than 300 scenarios (part in co-authorship). He is the author of five books, the creator of the concept of Self-liberating Game, which unites the theory and practice of the world theater with transpersonal psychology. Currently, he directs the theatrical project Harlequinada. The most famous role of the venereologist Kupitman in the comedy series Interns. Vadim Demchog also became the voice of the character of the animated web series Mr. Freeman. Permanent speaker of the Summer Campus of the Presidential Academy in Tatarstan.

== Selected filmography ==
- Streets of Broken Lights as Lavretsky the kidnapper (2003)
- My Fair Nanny as Babakhsky the fireworker (2005)
- Worm as Don Mook (2006)
- Mr. Freeman as Mr. Freeman (2009—present)
- Interns as Dr. Ivan Kupitman (2010—2016)
- The Superdeep as Dr. Dmitry Grigoriev (2020)
- Dads as Vasin (2022)
