= Kit and Kate =

Russian preschool children's cartoon series

- Created by: Vladimir Ponomarev; Michael Mennies; Mike de Sève
- Screenplay by: Mike de Sève; Michael Mennies; Jymn Magon; Susan Kim; Anne Bernstein; Evgenia Golubeva; Myles McLeod; P. Kevin Strader; Robert Leighton
- Directed by: Vladimir Ponomarev
- Voices of: Jakob Kleeman; Luci Jaxon; Grace Gonglewski; Buck Schrirner; Chloe Bernardete; Jake Corsi; Tom Cruise; Simeon Pegg; Ving Rhames; Nicole Kidman; Bruce Crossey; Kian Egan; Kyan Samuels; Keisuke Hoashi; Hayley Atwell; Pom Klementieff; Esai Morales; Jerry Yan; Lee Sang-jin; Yuuki Beppu; Ed Swidey; Rich Orlow; Liz Filios; Scott Greer; Michael Mennies; Ed Corsi; Jolie Darrow
- Theme music composer: Michael Mennies; Boris Dolmatov; Steve D'Angelo; Cristian Sorlow; Mike de Sève
- Composer: Steve D'Angelo
- Countries of origin: United States; Russia; Cyprus; France; Italy (season 2)
- Original language: English
- No. of seasons: 2
- No. of episodes: 104

Production
- Producer: Pavel Muntyan
- Running time: 5 minutes
- Production company: Toonbox

Original release
- Network: Carousel
- Release: 1 September 2015 – 27 December 2019

Kit and Kate (stylized as Kit ^n^ Kate; Russian: Котики, вперёд!, romanized: Kotiki, vperyod!, lit. 'Kittens, let's go!') is a Russian-French-American preschool children's educational series of educational animated shorts for children aged 2–5, produced by Russian company Toonbox (whose animation studio and ABC Kids office were later respectively relocated to Cyprus), in conjunction with a team of American, French and Russian artists. It has a Friulian dub called "Tui e Tuie". Its English channel has more than 470,000 subscribers, and more than 282,000,000 total views.

== Plot ==
The series follows the adventures of two blue cat siblings named Kit (the older brother) and Kate (the younger sister), wondering what to play for the day, get inside a box and discover an item. The siblings then get out of the box and go on an 'adventure' related to the item. However, their 'adventure' often ends in a bad result because of a behavior of either Kit, Kate or both. Then, either the siblings' mother or father appears, disguised as someone passing by, and discusses the situation until either Kit or Kate understand what they need to learn. The siblings, already recognizing their parent, thank the parent, and go on their 'adventure' again from the beginning, but doing some things differently as advised, this time ending in success.

In every episode of season 2, Kit and Kate make up a story together, sometimes getting help from their parents and grandfather to think of the name of the story and its synopsis. The story then begins with a character doing a specific thing. Then, Kit and Kate high-five each other which magically sends them into the story. Often, the character mentioned in the story or Kit and Kate get into a bit of a hassle, but as soon as they learn something, they try retelling the story, but this time changing it via the moral that they learnt all the way.

== Characters ==
- Kit (Russian: Котя) - the eldest sibling in the family. He sometimes teaches Kate a few things, and Kit is very supportive. Like Kate and really everybody, Kit also sometimes does a bad thing like he cheated on hiding and seeking in the episode called "The Cheat Is On". He wears an orange, sleeveless shirt and green shorts.
- Kate (Russian: Катя) - the middle sibling in the family. She only knows a few things but she still plays with Kit. Also, Kate is often the one who learns and subsequently recites the lesson in the end. Also, she tried so hard and yet so far, and in the end, it doesn't even matter. She always remembers before she forgets. She wears a pink dress with a star in the middle.
- Dad (Russian: Папа) Kit, Masha and Kate's father. Appearance: Glasses, whiskers, green jumper, dark green shorts. He sometimes disguises himself as a mysterious stranger in Series 1 (first in “Time To Climb”), when the kids discover that it was him.
- Mum (Russian: Мама) Kit, Masha and Kate's mother. Appearance: Gold earrings, yellow dress. She sometimes disguises herself as a mysterious stranger in Series 1, when the kids discover that it was her.
- Grandpa (Russian: Дедушка) Kit, Masha and Kate's grandfather. Introduced in season 2. His ears and colour are different to the other family members since he's the oldest. Appearance: White moustache, white and teal striped shirt, brown shorts.
- Hansel (Russian: Гензель) and Gretel (Russian: Гретель) Both brother and sister. They are based on the popular fairytale. Each of them have stereotypical German outfit, and sometimes introduce basic German phrases, like "Wunderbar!" which means "wonderful".
- Ducks (Russian: Утята)
  - Quick (duck) (Russian: Гоша)
  - Quack (duck) (Russian: Тоша)
  - Quake (duck) (Russian: Тимоша)
- Woofy (Russian: Вуфи) and Poofy (Russian: Пуфи) are two celebrity poodles that both appeared in “Hair And Share Alike”. Woofy is white while Poofy is brown. They both have a French accent, which makes sense because they are poodles.
- Baby Masha (Russian: Веби Маша) is the youngest sibling in the cat family. Unlike her parents and older siblings, who are blue and have appeared in the show, Baby Masha is pink and only appears in Kit ^n^ Kate Nursery Rhymes (which are on YouTube and YouTube Kids).

== List of episodes ==
=== Season 1 (2014–17) ===
No.	English name	Russian name	On YouTube	Year	Length	Moral
01	Me, Oh My, Blueberry Pie!	Прыг да скок, черничный пирог!	23 June 2017	September 1, 2014	5 min.	If you need to get somewhere on time, you can't always do everything you want.
02	Mad, Mad, Mad	Злючка-колючка	14 February 2019	September 8, 2014	5 min.	Just because things don't go the way you planned doesn't mean you can't have fun.
03	Time To Climb	Пора в горы	22 February 2019	September 15, 2014	5 min.	Don't do things you're too young for. Note: This is Dad's first appearance.
04	The Catelephant	Слонокот	12 March 2019	September 22, 2014	5 min.	It doesn't matter what someone likes or looks like-it only matters if they're nice or not.
05	The Great Race	Большие гонки	20 March 2019	September 29, 2014	5 min.	There are enough parts for something that you need, but you simply need to think about working together instead of working by yourself. Then you could have had the thing you wanted.
06	Baking Buddies	Торт для Принцессы	23 October 2015	October 6, 2014	5 min.	It might not always be as much fun just to do what the directions say, but you'll be much happier later when things come out the way you wanted them to.
07	The Kitty Express	Мяу-мяу экспресс	29 March 2019	October 13, 2014	5 min.	Working together means helping each other, even if it's not your job to do so.
08	Safari So Bad	Главное — подготовка	9 April 2019	October 20, 2014	5 min.	If you take the time to get ready before you leave, and not after you leave, you'll be ready to do what you want once you get there. Note: This episode’s title is a hilarious pun on the phrase "So far, so bad".
09	Hocus Pocus	Фокус-покус	18 April 2019	October 27, 2014	5 min.	"Please" and "Thank you" are the most powerful magic words of all.
10	Super Duper Party Pooper	Фу-ты ну-ты, не будь занудой!	25 April 2019	November 4, 2014	5 min.	It's OK to feel jealous, but it's not OK to do bad things.
11	Snow Lie	Соврёшь — пропадёшь!	6 May 2019	November 11, 2014	5 min.	Tell the truth, and don't lie.
12	Don't Be Shellfish	Водолазы	16 May 2019	November 18, 2014	5 min.	Don't take things that aren't yours without asking for permission.
13	The Candy Kingdom	Королевство сладостей	31 May 2019	November 25, 2014	5 min.	You can find creative ways to solve a problem using the things you have.
14	The Treasure Of Parrot Point	Сокровища острова Попугая	11 June 2019	December 2, 2014	5 min.	Don't just pick the pretty thing; pick the thing that you really need.
15	Hoe-Down Slow Down	Танцуют все!	23 October 2015	December 9, 2014	5 min.	Put things back where they belong so they won't get ruined or stolen.
16	The Big Bouquet	Большой букет	18 June 2019	December 16, 2014	5 min.	Take care of nature (for example, if you pick all of the flowers, there won't be any left to look at).
17	I Can't Wait	Хочешь кататься, умей дождаться!	25 June 2019	January 15, 2015	5 min.	Good things come to those who wait. Don't cut in line; wait your turn. In other words, be patient.
18	Quit Bugging Me	Песенка из космоса	2 July 2019	January 22, 2015	5 min.	Don't hurt those that are smaller or weaker than you.
19	Go Cry A Kite	Слезами горю не поможешь	16 July 2019	January 29, 2015	5 min.	Crying is OK, but it doesn't help solve a problem. When a problem needs solving, you need to calm down so you can think of what to do.
20	Bubble Trouble	Пляж мыльных пузырей	23 July 2019	February 5, 2015	5 min.	If someone bothers you, ask why, and don't bother them back in return.
21	All Fired Up	Как стать пожарным	30 July 2019	February 12, 2015	5 min.	Don't play with fire; being a real fireman means making sure fires don't start.
22	A Couple Of Quacks	Весёлые доктора	6 August 2019	February 19, 2015	5 min.	Doing what you have to do to get better might not always be fun, but you have to do it. Also, sweets are not for sick people or animals.
23	Hair And Share Alike	Делись и больше не дерись!	13 August 2019	February 26, 2015	5 min.	Share or take turns using things or doing things that belong to everybody.
24	Home! Sweet Home!	Сладкий домик	20 August 2019	March 5, 2015	5 min.	Save sweets for after meals.
25	Too Few Clues	Кто похитил сокровища?	23 October 2015	March 12, 2015	5 min.	Get all of the facts before solving a problem.
26	Drop Everything	Не бросай, как попало!	28 August 2019	March 19, 2015	5 min.	Finish your work before you play or clean up your mess.
27	The Wishing Stars	Звездопад желаний	4 September 2019	March 26, 2015	5 min.	The value of sleeps and naps.
28	Duckie See Duckie Do	Приключения в аквапарке	12 September 2019	April 2, 2015	5 min.	Set a good example. Monkey See, Monkey Do.
29	Stay Put	Оставайся на месте!	23 October 2015	April 9, 2015	5 min.	If you get separated from your group, stay put.
30	The Cheat Is On	Играй честно!	17 September 2019	April 16, 2015	5 min.	Play fair, and don't cheat. If you cheat in a game of Duck, Duck, Goose, you risk arguing with all the other players over who's it.
31	Bossy Bossy Boss	Самый главный начальник	8 October 2019	April 23, 2015	5 min.	Don't be bossy; listen to others, and be open to other's ideas.
32	The Reel Deal	Так не договаривались!	15 October 2019	April 30, 2015	5 min.	Keep your promises, because a deal is a deal.
33	Good Enough	Сойдёт и так	22 October 2019	2017	5 min.	You will be happier with the results of something if you try your best. Note: This episode is based on ancient Egypt
34	Making Friends	Идеальный друг	29 October 2019	2017	5 min.	Perfect friends find things they all like to do together, and not only things one of them likes.
35	Circus Bezerkus	Цыркус-Пыркус	5 November 2019	2017	5 min.	You can change your mood by doing things you like.
36	Dem Gems	Волшебные камни	12 November 2019	2017	5 min.	It's important to put things away so you can find them when you need them.
37	A Royal Fit	Королевский наряд	24 September 2019	2017	5 min.	Check your work to make sure it is right.
38	This Is Impossible	Это невозможно	1 October 2019	2017	5 min.	Some things are hard to learn at first, but if you keep on trying, you can do it.
39	And The Winner Is...	Настоящая победа	20 November 2019	2017	5 min.	A real winner makes sure everyone's tickety-boo.
40	All By Myself	Всё сделаю сам!	27 November 2019	2017	5 min.	When everyone gets a chance to help, it's more fun for everyone.
41	The Gift	Подарок	17 December 2019	2017	5 min.	How you get something can be more important than what you get. Note: This is a Christmas episode.
42	One Big Mess	Большой беспорядок	30 December 2019	2017	5 min.	Slow and steady wins the race, that's why the Hare from "The Hare And The Tortoise" (AKA "The Tortoise and the Hare") lost the race. Also, a big job is just a lot of little jobs.
43	The Kitty Kitty Bop	Катя-Котя-степ	9 January 2020	2017	5 min.	Things that may be easy for you take time for others to learn.
44	Just Desserts	Просто десерт	15 January 2020	2017	5 min.	Wash your hands before eating, and don't eat things off the ground.
45	The Pet Set	Набор для питомца	22 January 2020	2017	5 min.	Pets are not toys; they are living creatures that need to be taken care of.
46	The Chew Chew Train	Чух-чух ням-ням	29 January 2020	2017	5 min.	Food is fuel for your body — because it gives you energy to get things done.
47	Now We're Cookin'!	На всякий случай!	13 February 2020	2017	5 min.	If you always let someone else do something for you, you won't be able to do it by yourself when you need to.
48	The Blame Game	Ищу виноватого	19 February 2020	2017	5 min.	Blaming does not help to solve a problem. It just might lead to an even bigger problem instead.
49	And What If?!	А что если...?	26 February 2020	2017	5 min.	If you hear something scary, please ask a grown-up if there is anything real to worry about.
50	Dressed To ill	Одевайся по погоде	3 March 2020	2017	5 min.	It's important to wear the right clothes for any kind of weather.
51	Quiet Time	Тихий час	13 March 2020	2017	5 min.	There are times to be quiet, and times when it is OK to be noisy.
52	Something Fishy	Клёвое место	19 March 2020	2017	5 min.	Don't do anything to anyone else that you would not want them to do to you.

=== Season 2 (2018–19) ===
No.	English name	Russian name	On YouTube	Year	Length	Moral
53	The Right Fluff	Счастливая шапочка	27 March 2020	2018	5 min.	If you lose something, retracing your steps can help you find it.
54	My First Flame	Мой первый огонёк	31 March 2020	2018	5 min.	Don't promise what you can't deliver.
55	One Crabby Day	Крабий день	14 April 2020	2018	5 min.	Be happy with who you are.
56	Gone Wishing	Загадай желание	21 April 2020	2018	5 min.	You never know where you will find a friend.
57	The Space Squid Kid	Космический кальмарчик	28 April 2020	2018	5 min.	Ask someone what they want before giving them something they don't want.
58	Land of the Lost Socks	Страна потерянных носков	12 May 2020	2018	5 min.	You should give people (and bugs) a second chance.
59	You Can Say That Again	Можешь повторить!	19 May 2020	2018	5 min.	If you can't say something nice, don't say anything at all.
60	Bernie the Bat	Берни — летучая мышь	26 May 2020	2018	5 min.	You don't have to change who you are to fit in.
61	Gigi the Jigglebug	ДжиДжи — зибуляка	2 June 2020	2018	5 min.	Appreciate things for what they can do, not for what they can't.
62	A Good Day's Work	День помощи	9 June 2020	2018	5 min.	Kindness is its own reward.
63	That Crazy Little Mouse	Ужасная маленькая мышка	16 June 2020	2018	5 min.	Peaceful music can help you calm down.
64	Aw... Nuts!	Ох... Орешки	23 June 2020	2018	5 min.	Learn to control your temper. It's okay to feel angry, but it's not okay to be rude.
65	Monkey See Monkey Break	Макси видит, Макси рушит	30 June 2020	2018	5 min.	You can repair good old things instead of buying new ones.
66	Witch Way?	Ведьмин дом	7 July 2020	2019	5 min.	If you think you are seeing something scary in a dark room, turn on a light so you can see what is really there.
67	The Lollipop Rodeo	Сладкое родео	14 July 2020	2019	5 min.	If you ask for things rudely, don't be surprised if you get a rude answer back. But if you ask nicely, you might get a nice answer instead.
68	The Magic Flower	Волшебный цветок	21 July 2020	2019	5 min.	Everyone's unique talents can work together to form a powerful team.
69	Farmer Phil	Фермер Билл	11 August 2020	2019	5 min.	You'll have an easier time getting what you want if you ask nicely. Note: This episode’s moral is almost the same as "The Lollipop Rodeo"'s moral.
70	The Missing Stink	Пропавший запах	18 August 2020	2019	5 min.	By just accepting who you are, you can let the very best you have to offer come out.
71	How to Beat a Bully	Как победить задиру	25 August 2020	2019	5 min.	There are more effective ways for confronting bullies than trying to fight them.
72	I Can't Decide	Не могу решить	1 September 2020	2019	5 min.	Sometimes it's hard to make a decision but there are things you can do to make it easier.
73	Gopher Help	Спешим на помощь!	8 September 2020	2019	5 min.	Getting done a little work now can stop it from becoming work you cannot handle later.
74	The Mayor of Lazyville	Мэр Ленивбурга	15 September 2020	2019	5 min.	The key to success is hard work.
75	A Giant Problem	Гигантская проблема	28 July 2020	2019	5 min.	It's best to plan ahead.
76	The Mouster Builder	Мышонок-строитель	22 September 2020	2019	5 min.	Do not hesitate to ask for help.
77	Dragoon to the Moon	Дракодув и Луна	29 September 2020	2019	5 min.	Keep your promises.
78	The Creature of Habit	Зверская привычка	6 October 2020	2019	5 min.	You can't discover new things to enjoy unless you try them.
79	A Charming Story	Очаровательная история	13 October 2020	2019	5 min.	Read the instructions!
80	The Superest Superhero	Супер-пупер герой	20 October 2020	2019	5 min.	Being a superhero is not about what powers you have, but how you use the powers you have to help others.
81	Pay Attention To Me!	Обрати на меня внимание!	27 October 2020	2019	5 min.	Just because your parents get busy helping others, doesn't mean they don't love you.
82	Rulandia Rules	Правила Правляндии	3 November 2020	2019	5 min.	Some rules may be dumb but others are there to keep us safe.
83	Three Who Never Agree	Трое, которые в ссоре	12 November 2020	2019	5 min.	Voting is a way to make a decision when everyone doesn't agree.
84	Chew on This!	Съешь это!	17 November 2020	2019	5 min.	Don't eat things you shouldn't.
85	Bury Good	Спрятать, не найти!	24 November 2020	2019	5 min.	When you hide something, write down or try to remember where you put it.
86	Move It!	Отодвинься!	1 December 2020	2019	5 min.	When someone is bothering you, sometimes the best thing you can do is move.
87	Let the Games Begin!	Давай играть?!	8 December 2020	2019	5 min.	Give everyone else a chance to do something.
88	The Tallest Tower	Высочайшая башня	15 December 2020	2019	5 min.	Don't fight on anything.
89	A Korny Secret	Весёлый секрет	22 December 2020	2019	5 min.	There is a time and place for joking around.
90	Picture Perfect	Самое лучшее	29 December 2020	2019	5 min.	Something doesn't have to be perfect to make something wonderful from it.
91	The Host with the Most	Вместе веселее	5 January 2021	2019	5 min.	Sharing what you like with your guest is what makes a fun and generous host.
92	The Changinator	Изменитель	12 January 2021	2019	5 min.	Getting someone else's life doesn't mean getting just the good parts; it means getting all the parts.
93	I Wish My Wish	Я хочу то, что я хочу	19 January 2021	2019	5 min.	Just because you like something doesn't mean someone else will.
94	The Giraffe Who Kept Everything	Жираф, который всё сохранял	26 January 2021	2019	5 min.	Don't hold on to things you don't need anymore.
95	Noise for Toys	Так не честно	2 February 2021	2019	5 min.	Playing fair gives everyone a chance to win.
96	Beep! Beep! Beep!	Бип! Бип! Бип!	9 February 2021	2019	5 min.	The secret to working together is understanding how to talk clearly to one another.
97	That's the Plan	Всё по плану	16 February 2021	2019	5 min.	You can't control everything.
98	Everyday's a Birthday!	День рождения каждый день	23 February 2021	2019	5 min.	A birthday is special because it only happens once a year.
99	Two Kittens Who Couldn't Make Up a Story	Котята, которые не могли придумать историю	9 March 2021	2019	5 min.	Anyone can find inspiration for creativity.
100	The Cool Ghoul	Крутой вампир	2 March 2021	2019	5 min.	It's cool to do things that are fun or silly, but it isn't cool to do something that might hurt anyone.
101	The Grumpy Elves	Сердитые эльфы	16 March 2021	2019	5 min.	Find ways to turn your bad mood around.
102	The Wolfingtown News	Новости Вольфины	23 March 2021	2019	5 min.	Don't tell fake news to others.
103	Over the Mooooon!	Прямо через Луну	30 March 2021	2019	5 min.	You can find things to give you good luck.
104	Secret Agent Mouse	Секретный агент Мышь	6 April 2021	27 December 2019	5 min.	Ask permission first before taking a thing that isn't yours.

== Merchandise ==
Multiple books adapting the episodes "Me Oh My! Blueberry Pie!", "Hoe-Down Slow-Down", "Top Gun", "Days of Thunder", "Mission: Impossible" and "Time To Climb!" were released in Russia, Malaysia, Brunei, Indonesia, Vietnam, China, Japan, & Korea around 2020 or 2021 or 2022. There are also plush toys of Kit and Kate available only in Russia, Malaysia, Brunei, Indonesia, Vietnam, China, Japan & Korea. In 2017, coloring pages and books of moments from the show were released online.
