= Qumi-Qumi =

Russian-Cypriot animated television series

- Genre: Comedy
- Created by: Vladimir Ponamarev; Pavel Muntyan; Georgy Vasiliev; Arthur Merkulov; Dmitry Gorbunov; Stan Norden; Alexey Kotenochkin; Vladimir Afanasyev; Alexey Minchenok; Oleg Uzhinov; Natalia Rumyantseva; Alexey Lebedev
- Directed by: Vladimir Ponomarev
- Voices of: Maryana Spivak; Vladimir Ponomarev; Alexander Vlasov; Alina Rin; Larisa Brochman
- Countries of origin: Russia; Cyprus
- Original language: Tarabar
- No. of seasons: 3
- No. of episodes: 21

Production
- Producers: Pavel Muntyan; Ilya Popov
- Running time: 11 minutes
- Production company: Toonbox Animation Studio

Original release
- Network: NTV; STS (2013–2014); 2x2 (2011–2014); Karusel (2012–present); Tlum HD (2016–2019); Ryzhy; Multik HD (2017–2019); Ani (2019–present); TiJi (2017–2019)
- Release: March 2011 – 2019

Qumi-Qumi (Russian: Куми-Куми, Kumi-Kumi) is an animated series created by Toonbox, best known for the Cut the Rope cartoons. From November 2012, it premiered on Multilandia (Multimania) and Carousel. On October 14, 2013, it began broadcasting on the channel STS. The series was developed with the financial support of the Government of Moscow, and since 2011 with the support of Film Foundation. It is based around a small comic book from 2005 that eventually made it into a small music video in 2007, and eventually into a full-fledged cartoon in 2011. Qumi-Qumi tells of three different tribes: the magic-based tribal Jumi-Qumi, the science-based capitalist Yumi-Qumi, and the militaristic and communistic Shumi-Qumi. Three young outcasts of each tribe, Juga, Yusi, and Shumadan, manage to break out of their social norms and become close friends. The speech of the characters is a gibberish language known as Tarabar (though with its own specific words) peppered with Russian phrases. Many plots relate around Juga and Shumadan's crushes on Yusi and trying to interact with their respective tribes despite their own faults.

As of March 2025, the series has:

- 96 million views on the English version of the channel
  - 535 million views on the Russian version of the channel
    - Total views on two YouTube versions: 631 million (85% on the Russian version and 15% on the English version)

== Plot summary ==
Qumi-Qumi is a comedy animated series for children ages 8–12. The prototypes of Qumi-Qumi were created in 2005 for a comic strip festival. In 2007, a short cartoon music video with dancing Qumi-Qumi characters in it gained high popularity online with 5 million viewings.

Qumi-Qumi portrays three tribes, the Jumi-Qumi, Yumi-Qumi, and Shumi-Qumi. The three main characters, Juga from the Jumi-Qumi tribe, Yusi from the Yumi-Qumi tribe, and Shumadan from the Shumi-Qumi tribe, are best friends who get along (something that the tribes don't do) and adventures of the three are followed throughout the series.

== Synopsis ==
The Qumi world consists of three tribes which live separately: the Yumi-Qumi (technology-focused people modeled on modern America), Jumi-Qumi (shamanistic and rustic, roughly based on tribal African societies) and Shumi-Qumi (militaristic and resembling Soviet Russia). Juga, Yusi, and Shumadan each come from one of the different tribes, but get on much better with each other than with their tribesmen, who consider them odd. Some of the characters may be based on other media. In every episode, one of the three friends runs into a situation that all of them need to resolve. The fact that both Juga and Shumadan are in love with Yusi doesn't make the situation any easier. The series lacks dialogue, with the characters instead speaking the simple constructed Qumi language, with words mostly based on words from Toki Pona, English, Japanese, Korean, and Russian, as well as some words and phrases from popular culture.

The series is set in an abstract reality. The Qumi-Qumi world bears a slight resemblance to Earth; however, it's notable for being home to fanciful and colorful landscapes and fantastical creatures.

== Background ==
The show originates in 2005, when creator Vladimir Ponomarev created a comic of the show for the comics festival. Eventually, in 2008, a small music video was made out of this comic, which was a hit success. Finally, after a pilot in 2010, the show was finally released in 2011. Each episode is 11-minutes long.

== Characters ==
=== Main ===
==== Juga ====
Juga (Russian: Джуга) is a Jumi-Qumi member. He is lazy and somewhat rude, which causes him to lose focus on his magic very easily. Like Shumadan, he has a crush on Yusi, and competes with him to try and win her heart. He often uses dirty tricks to succeed through life, but he is still good at heart, and will help his friends when they truly need it. He is the only main character who has never cried, Like the other members of his tribe, Juga is blue and rectangular with three ear-like extensions in various shades of blue coming out of the back of his head. He often wears a red, black, green, and orange skullcap. He has black legs, and blue arms with black fingers. A small thing is located in between his legs or possibly on his back - it might be a small tail of sorts.

==== Yusi ====
Yusi (Russian: Юси) is one of the main characters on Qumi-Qumi. She is a Yumi-Qumi. Yusi is a representative of the Yumi-Qumi tribe. She is a hippie-girl coming from a wealthy family who is bored with chasing success. However, Yusi is used to comfort and sometimes acts as a spoiled and fickle girl. Yusi loves high-tech gadgets and is always carrying her portable device which can transform into anything from a phone to a scooter. Yusi can fix any complicated gadget in no time. She is very cheerful and never feels depressed. Yusi is sensitive and sentimental. She loves animals; however, there's almost none left on her island. Being sober-minded, Yusi counterbalances energetic Juga and phlegmatic Shumadan. She cannot understand which of the guys she loves more and behaves as a coquette nourishing their rivalry.

==== Shumadan ====
Shumadan (Russian: Шумадан) is a Shumi-Qumi member. Like the rest of the Shumi-Qumi, Shumadan is rectangular and green. He has three striped ear-like extensions coming out of his head in green, orange, and black. He has black eyes with three eyelashes on each eye. His mouth is burnt orange, and he has green arms striped orange and lime. His legs are striped in two shades of green. He wears a bag with two red and blue military badges on the straps.

=== Recurring ===
==== Bai-Baba ====
Bai-Baba (Russian: Бай-Баба) is a recurring character. She is a Jumi-Qumi. Bai-Baba is the second-most important member of the Jumi-Qumi tribe, after the Chief. She is the tribe's witch doctor and medicine woman. It is also her job to teach the young Jumi-Qumi magic skills. She is easily frustrated by Juga, as he is one of her constantly-failing students. She is one of the saner members of the tribe, but resorts to crazy measures in desperate times. She also owns a ceremonial mask that looks like a gas mask that she often wears in certain situations.

==== Shumi-Qumi General ====
Shumi-Qumi General (Russian: Генерал Шуми-Куми) is the leader of the Shumi-Qumi tribe and a recurring character in the show.

==== Oilo ====
Oilo (Russian: Ойло) Is a small oil creature that the Shumi-Qumi General wanted to use to make oil rockets.

==== Elvis ====
Elvis (Russian: Элвис) known as "The King of Rock and Roll" is the only real world character that appears in the show.

==== Ququlka ====
Ququlka (Russian: Кукулька) is a small cyclonic creature who is often seen in the show.

== Language ==
Even though the show uses gibberish, over the years, viewers of the shows have deciphered the language (known as "Tarabar" as per mentioned above) and have found that it uses words and phrases from Toki Pona, English, Japanese, Korean, and Russian. Although a dictionary, or a full version of the language has been found or deciphered, some words have been found on context, such as "Gadym" meaning "Hello", "Pogonya" meaning "Danger", or just used as a term for something that can harm.

== Voices ==
1. Juga - Vladimir Ponomarev
2. Shumadan - Vladimir Ponomarev
3. Yusi (episodes 1–2) - Maryana Spivak
4. Yusi (episodes 3–21) - Alina Rin
5. Bai-Baba - Marianna Spivak
6. Shumi-Qumi General - Aleksandr Vlasov
7. Oilo (episode 7) - Alina Rin
8. Ququlka - Alina Rin
9. The Queen (episode 9) - Nastya Lapina
10. Elvis - Mark Thompson

== Episodes ==
=== Season 1 (2010–16) ===
Note: This is the only season to be animated in 2D.

1. The Legend (Russian: Легенда) - 2011
2. Solar Energy (Russian: Солнечная Энергия) - 2011
3. Trash Toad (Russian: Мусорная жаба) - 2012
4. Fishing (Russian: Рыбалка) - 2012
5. The Cloudies (Russian: Облачный край) - 2012
6. Snowman (Russian: Новый Год) - 2012
7. Oilo (Russian: Ойло) - 2012
8. The Small Worm (Russian: Червячок) - 2012
9. The Third Eye (Russian: Третий глаз) - 2013
10. The Robot (Russian: Робот) - 2013
11. General In Love (Russian: Влюбленный генерал) - 2013
12. Qumi-Mix (Russian: Куми-Микс) - 2013
13. The Zombie (Russian: Зомби) - 2014
14. Money, Money (Russian: Мани, Мани) - 2010 (pilot), 2015 (remake)
15. The Portals (Russian: Порталы) - 2016

=== Season 2 (2017–18) ===
Note: This season is animated in 3D using a 360° VR aspect ratio.

1. (16A) Hocus-Pocus - Stories 1 (360) - 2017
2. (16B) Hocus-Pocus - Stories 2 (360) - 2017
3. (16C) Hocus-Pocus - Stories 3 (360) - 2017
4. (16D) Hocus-Pocus - Stories 4 (360) - 2018

=== Season 3 (2019) ===
Note: This season is also animated in 3D, but without the VR of the previous season.

1. (17) A Lost Dream (Russian: Потерянный сон)
2. (18) The Time Machine (Russian: Машина времени)

== Awards ==
- 2012 — Qumi-Qumi was awarded as People's Choice at the 17th International Festival of Children's Animation "The Goldfish";
- 2012 — the most wicked and mean character was found in Qumi-Qumi series by the jury of the first Festival of National Animation;
- 2013 — episode "The Third Eye" was awarded as the best animated movie of the year by Newgrounds.
- 2014 — episode "The Zombie" was awarded as the best visual imagery by the kids' jury;
- 2019 — Qumi-Qumi in an updated format (2D+3D) was awarded as the best series at XXIV Suzdal Animation Fest.
