= Toonbox =

Animation studio

- Type: Private
- Industry: Animation
- Founded: 5 May 2008; 18 years ago in Moscow, Russia
- Headquarters: Moscow, Russia (2008–2014); Paphos, Cyprus (2014–present)
- Key people: Pavel Muntyan (CEO); Vladimir Ponomarev (CCO)
- Website: www.toonbox.studio

Toonbox is an animation studio based in Paphos, Cyprus. The studio was founded on 5 May 2008 in Moscow, Russia.

== History ==
The studio was founded in 2008, by Pavel Muntyan (CEO) and Vladimir Ponomarev (CCO).

Starting from 2011, Toonbox representatives got actively involved in the development of animated cinematography, including the niche of attracting investments to the industry.

In 2012, Toonbox openly claimed its involvement in the production of the Mr. Freeman animated series on a TV-channel belonging to Sergey Minaev.

Starting from 2013, the studio has been focusing mainly on animated series for kids.

Since 2014, Toonbox leaders have been urging against anti-advertisement policy in animated cinematograph and television for the sake of industry development. A new episode of Mr. Freeman was dedicated to a truly acute topic in Russia — bitcoin, has been shown in 130 cities worldwide at a time. The headquarters of the company moved to Cyprus. The move turned out to be in the spotlight of mass media both in Russia and abroad.

In 2015, the street artist Banksy played Mr. Freeman's episode "Walking on By" at the opening of his entertainment park Dismaland.

On October 12, 2016, Rovio Entertainment (creator of Angry Birds) became an official licensing partner of the brand Kit and Kate created by Toonbox.

Up to late 2019, Toonbox produced 357 animated movies with a total time-keeping of 18.5 hours. Toonbox produces English, Russian, and non-dialogue content in full HD in 2D, CGI, and 360 VR formats. Its flagship series include Kit and Kate, Qumi-Qumi, and Mr. Freeman.

Toonbox films and series have dubbings into 27 languages and are being broadcast in 130 countries on both TV-channels and VOD platforms. Toonbox YouTube channels can boast 1,9 billion of views. Its international agents include such major companies as Riki Group, Planet Nemo Animation, Maurizio Distefano Licensing, Dadi Media and Ferly.

== Productions ==
Production years	Title	Episodes	Seasons	Director	Scriptwriter
2008–2009	The Real Adventures of Belka and Strelka	6	1	Vladimir Ponomarev	Comedy Club
2009–2012	Russian Short Fairy-Tales	36	2	Andrey Bakhurin	Andrey Bakhurin, Valentin Vinogradov, Inga Kirkizh
2009–2026	Mr. Freeman	33	2	Vladimir Ponomarev	Pavel Muntyan, Anatoly Dobrozhan, Vadim Demchog, Ivan Trofimov, Arthur Merkulov
2010	The Bump	3	1	Arthur Merkulov	Anatoly Dobrozhan
2010–2013	Shaman's Quest	12	1	Arthur Merkulov	Arthur Merkulov
2010–2019	Qumi-Qumi	22	3	Vladimir Ponomarev	Vladimir Ponomarev, Pavel Muntyan, Stanislav Mikhailov, Arthur Merkulov, Dmitry Gorbunov, Alexey Minchenok, Vladimir Afanasyev, Alexey Kotenochkin, Oleg Uzhinov, Natalya Rumyantseva
2011–2014	Om Nom Stories	28	3	Arthur Merkulov, Dmitry Gorbunov	Stanislav Mikhailov
2014–2015, 2017–2019	Kit^n^Kate	104	2	Vladimir Ponomarev	Michael Mennies, Mike de Sève, Jymn Magon, Susan Kim, Anne D. Bernstein
2021–present	Take My Muffin	30	3	Basil Tailor	Stas Mikhailov-Norden, Vladimir Ponomarev, Pavel Muntyan

== Animated short films ==
- The Hero as the Rock, 2010, directed by Alexandr Svirsky
- Word and Words, 2010, directed by Alexandr Svirsky
- The Magic Pot, 2010, directed by Andrey Bahurin
- Onotole, 2010, directed by Dmitry Gorbunov, Artur Merkulov
- Chepurnas, 2012, directed by Alexandr Svirsky

== Awards ==
- Vinnician Festival, 2008, for the animated movie The Real Adventures of Belka and Strelka
- Russian Flash Awards', 2009, for the animated movie Three Acrobat Brothers (Best Animation)
- Open Russian Festival of Animated Film, 2010, for the animated movie The History Could Have Gone Differently (Best Applied Animation)
- On April 15, 2010 Mr. Freeman was awarded as the best video blog at the international Weblog competition The Best of Blogs in Berlin
- VI Multimatograph, 2010, for the series Shaman's Quest (Grand Prix of the festival)
- Open Russian Festival of Animated Film, 2012, for the animated movie The Berry Pie (Best Kids' Movie)
- X Moscow Festival of Native Movies, 2012, for the movie The Berry Pie (Audience Award)
- XXIV Animation Festival in Suzdal, 2019, for Qumi-Qumi series in an updated format (2D and 3D)

== Links ==
- Toonbox Studio, official site
- Mr. Freeman, official site
- Qumi-Qumi, official site
- Shaman's Quest, official site
- Kit^n^Kate, official site
