= Carl2 =

Canadian animated sitcom (2005–2011)

Carl^{2}
- From left to right: Carl, Rex, and C2.
- Also known as: Carl Squared
- Genre: Animated sitcom Comedy
- Created by: Lila Rose; Carolyn Hay; Eva Almos
- Directed by: William Speers; Mike Csunyoscka; Steve "Funky Chicken" Neilson
- Voices of: Stuart Stone; Bryn McAuley; Jordan Francis; Emily Hampshire; Kathy Laskey; Rick Roberts; Samantha Espie
- Theme music composer: Pure West: Paul Koffman; Tim Foy
- Opening theme: "Carl Squared"
- Ending theme: "Carl Squared"
- Composers: Pure West: Paul Koffman; Tim Foy
- Country of origin: Canada
- Original language: English
- No. of seasons: 4
- No. of episodes: 65 (list of episodes)

Production
- Executive producers: Lisa Olfman; Joy Rosen
- Producer: Julie Stall
- Running time: 22 minutes
- Production companies: PiP Animation Services; Portfolio Entertainment

Original release
- Network: Teletoon
- Release: August 7, 2005 – January 23, 2011

Carl Squared, stylized as Carl^{2}, is a Canadian animated sitcom which explores what would happen if a teenager had a clone. The concept of the series is a mixture of biological studies and normal teenage life. It aired for four seasons on Teletoon from August 7, 2005 to January 23, 2011. 65 episodes were produced.

== Plot ==
Carl Crashman is a lazy 14-year-old who is only good at one thing: slacking. After a rough day and being tired of constantly doing things he hates, he was blogging on the Internet and complaining about his life when he accidentally ordered a clone from a spam e-mail using his fingerprint, a yearbook photo and a scabby bandage; Carl is shocked when an online cloning company sends him an exact clone of himself in a box. Carl names him C2. Even though C2 looks like Carl, talks like him (albeit with a higher-pitched voice), and walks like him, C2 is more ambitious, hard-working, and charming, much to Carl's advantage. Since C2 arrived, Carl has been slacking off a lot more. However, C2 often does the opposite to what Carl wants. Carl decides to keep C2 a secret from everyone else except his best friend Jamie James.

The show's theme song, a soundalike for O Rappa, depicts the initial arrival of C2 at Carl's house. There are two different versions of the theme songs, each version having a new opening sequence and slightly alternate lyrics. As of Season 2, the opening sequence includes more on how C2 was created in the cloning lab.

== Characters ==
=== Main characters ===
- Carl Crashman (voiced by Stuart Stone) is a lazy, stereotypical teenager who has mastered the art of slacking off and finding ways not to spend time with his family. His hobbies include reading comic books, using his computer, playing video games, verbally blogging online, and skateboarding. He is somewhat selfish, obnoxious and often careless and insensitive, much to Skye's dismay. Although Carl is often vacancy frustrated with C2, it is shown that he would be worse off without him.
- C2 (voiced by Stuart Stone) is a clone of Carl created by an unnamed company that specializes in cloning. As an identical clone of Carl, he can pass as him and do things that he does not want to. C2's DNA was contaminated with that of Carl's dog Rex during his creation, causing him to enjoy catching Frisbees in his mouth and eating dog treats.
- Jamie James (voiced by Jordan Francis) is Carl's best friend and the only other person to know about C2. He always carries around a camcorder and talks in a manner akin to a gangster.
- Skye Flower Blue (voiced by Bryn McAuley) is Carl's vegetarian girlfriend who is passionate about social justice issues, such as environmentalism and animal rights.

=== Crashman family ===
- Chloe Crashman (voiced by Emily Hampshire) is Carl's rebellious 16-year-old sister. As a Goth, she always likes to think of negative things and has dark death parties in the cemetery. She hates anything sweet and likes to ignore her family.
- Janet Crashman (voiced by Kathy Laskey) is a psychiatrist and mother to Carl and Chloe. She quit her job as a psychiatrist upon seeing how her children were acting: Chloe seemed to have a really weird, dark personality and Carl appeared to have two personalities. Janet is also evidently the more stricter parent in the Crashman family (often likely to enforce disciplinary actions or scold her children when they misbehave; she also seems to be against her children decorating themselves with inappropriate body wear like tattoos or piercings).
- Barney Crashman (voiced by Rick Roberts) is the father of Carl and Chloe. He specializes in having ideas in making new things such as vegetable bacon and the notorious "Breakfast Dispenser". He also likes to fix things in the kitchen.
- Rex is Carl's pet beagle. C2 has 5% of his DNA and enjoys playing with Rex and sharing dog treats with him.

=== Minor characters ===
- Damien (voiced by Matthew Ferguson) is Chloe's boyfriend and companion. He always hangs out with Chloe and is seen doing dark rituals with her. While sharing the same passions than Chloe, he also shows interest in music and dance.
- Mr. Agar (voiced by Paul Pogue) is Carl's homeroom teacher. He detests Carl and always tries to look for a reason to get him into trouble.
- Lorna Gail Lookman (voiced by Samantha Espie) is Carl's neighbor, who has a hobby of looking into Carl's room with her binoculars. She likes Carl and wants to marry him in the future.
- Principal Powers (voiced by Martin Roach) is the principal of Carl and Chloe's high school. He is strict and gives out serious punishments to troublemakers.

== Episodes ==
The show is divided into 4 seasons of 13 episodes each, with the exception of the first one, which includes 26 episodes. A number of episodes are specials and are not regularly aired; these are indicated.

There are 2 two-part episodes in the show, one in Season 2 and the other in Season 4. The Season 2 one was made as a contest; after the first part of the episode, Teletoon viewers were asked to vote online and by text messaging to determine who would be the winner out of the remaining 3 contestants, Carl, Jamie, and Skye. The winner was announced in the second part of the episode. The Season 4 one was made as a mystery; after the first part of the episode, Teletoon viewers were asked to go to the show's website and try to solve it. The solution was announced in the second part of the episode.

Carl^{2} first aired on August 7, 2005 as a sneak preview of the first episode. However, regular airings of the show only started on September 3, 2005.

=== Series overview ===
Season	Episodes	Originally released	
Season	Episodes	First released	Last released
1	26	August 7, 2005	July 19, 2006
2	13	December 15, 2006	March 18, 2007
3	13	May 4, 2007	August 26, 2007
4	13	October 3, 2010	January 23, 2011

=== Season 1 (2005–06) ===
No. overall	No. in season	Title	Written by	Original release date
1	1	"The Art of Being Carl"	Louise Moon and Eva Almos	August 7, 2005
In response to Skye's nearing birthday, Carl has C2 find a job to make some money for a present. Little does Carl know that C2's new job is being a nude model at an art school. Things go from bad to worse after Carl finds that Skye's party will take place next to the art school where a nude Carl painting hangs.
2	2	"Carl, True or False"	Louise Moon and Eva Almos	September 3, 2005
Carl gets accused of cheating on a Biology test after C2 gets him a 105%.
3	3	"Paging Dr. Carl"	Ken Cuperus	September 11, 2005
C2 gets tonsillitis and has to remove them by surgery. This raises suspicion because Carl already had his tonsils removed years ago. Carl's secret is in risk of getting found out and Carl has to play smart in order to stop it.
4	4	"Carl the Magnificent"	Tim Burns	September 18, 2005
C2 invites Shane, Carl's cousin and his family to stay at his house. Carl strongly hates Shane, especially because of the magic tricks he tries on Carl. To get rid of him, Carl starts a magical war, but he's not sure if he can win.
5	5	"Tree to Be"	Jennifer Cowan and Eva Almos	September 25, 2005
Carl has a choice between helping Skye save a tree or entering a skateboarding contest. He tells C2 to go help Skye but nothing turns out as Carl wanted.
6	6	"A Scare to Remember"	Paul Pogue	October 22, 2005
Carl is forced to hand out candy for Halloween, but makes use of C2 to handle it for him so that he can get to Skye's party. C2 believes that everything is free on Halloween and ends up helping a burglar (mistaking him for a trick-or-treater) rob a store! Mr. Agar spots him, and he's about to tell the police. Will Carl escape the arrest AND save C2 from the burglar in the house all in one night before the 'rents get home? Note: Halloween special
7	7	"A Tale of Two Carls"	Eva Almos	October 15, 2005
When Carl wants to ask his dream girl, Skye, to 'hang on a full time basis,' he realizes that his cocky ways 'don't fly,' where C2 has a natural sensitivity for romance. Carl sends C2 to win Skye over, but at the end of the day Carl realizes that Skye likes him for 'who he is' and although C2 attracted Skye initially, it is Carl she stays around for. Note: Pilot
8	8	"Carl of the Wild"	Louise Moon	November 20, 2005
Distracted by a hockey game, Carl lets C2 sign him up for Adventure Week, but when C2 signs him up for the Eco-Survival Ordeal instead of the Ultimate Cabin Experience, Carl tries to have it both ways and winds up creating an Ultimate Ordeal
9	9	"Christmas Clone"	Louise Moon	December 18, 2005
After a disaster concerning C2 making a fool out of himself while taking the annual family Christmas picture, Carl tells C2 that there is no such thing as Santa. His parents think that Carl is too grown up for Christmas, so Dr. Mom returns all the gifts: NOO! While C2 runs off to search for Santa, Carl searches for C2 and he is about to learn the true meaning of Christmas. Note: Christmas special
10	10	"Romeo and Juliet"	Howard Nemetz	January 8, 2006
When Carl and C2 switch out playing the lead role in the school play in Carl's attempt score a big kiss with Skye, Carl's 'stage fright' is revealed.
11	11	"As Seen on TV"	Kenn Scott	January 15, 2006
Carl tries to earn a quick hundred bucks by entering the Coolest Skateboard Video contest, but when he leaves the filming to Jamie and C2, the video exposes C2's dog-like abilities and Carl is exploited as a freak on national TV.
12	12	"Cry Robot"	Paul Pogue	January 22, 2006
Carl and Skye are teamed in a health class assignment and become partners in raising a robotic baby, but when Carl leaves the baby in C2's care, he scans every parenting book and becomes overzealous, overly protective dad. Carl has to rescue the baby and his relationship with Skye while C2 cope with his empty nest.
13	13	"C2 Loves Lorna"	Richard Clark	February 12, 2006
Lorna Lookman finally finds out the way to Carl's heart. She bargains with Carl and tells him if he goes out on a date with her, she would give him a preordered copy of Carl's favorite game, which he dearly wants. As a back-up solution, he sends C2 on the date. However, at the end of the date, it all ends as a disaster for Carl - Skye is on the verge of breaking up with him, and C2 falls in love with Lorna. Note: Valentine's Day special
14	14	"Carl Bullied"	Deborah Jarvis	February 8, 2006
C2 makes friends with some bullies in Carl's detention, which turns Carl into their main target.
15	15	"Carl Scared"	Richard Clark	February 22, 2006
Carl let's C2 work on his science project, but when C2 buys a snake as part of the project, things become difficult for Carl, who is afraid of snakes.
16	16	"Replacement Carl"	Shawn Kalb	March 1, 2006
C2 is getting popular with Carl's friends and slowly begins to take away his social life. Is C2 really going to replace Carl?
17	17	"Time to Lean, Time to Clean"	Deborah Jarvis	March 22, 2006
Carl starts a business after finding out that his neighbors are willing to pay him to clean their house. Word had gotten out that one of Carl's workers, C2 is good at cleaning houses. But in the end, Carl's company crashes and burns, forcing him to go out of business.
18	18	"Grade A Disaster"	George Westerholm	March 29, 2006
Thanks to the help of C2, Carl becomes a teacher's pet. Mr. Agar gives him access to the teacher's lounge where Carl touches the teacher's computer for the fun of it. On the computer, he accidentally changes everyone's report card to straight A's.
19	19	"Take Your Clone to Work Day"	Dave Dias	April 12, 2006
Barney Crashman gets a new gig at an infomercial where he would try to sell his own breakfast dispenser. However, when Carl sends C2 to the "take your kids to work day", the owner of the infomercial company likes C2 more, forcing Barney to go off the stage of his dream job.
20	20	"Chad to the Bone"	Shawn Kalb	April 26, 2006
Chad is a new kid at Carl's school and has his eyes on Skye. Chad is a very nice, sweet, and helpful guy that would tell everyone that he has always been a good kid. Jealous that Chad is trying to take his move on Skye, Carl tries to find out anything bad about Chad. Meanwhile, Jamie tries to find out a great story to win the news anchor contest. Carl finds out that Chad is the "Locker Thief" of the Mapleview High; eventually Chad is caught in the act by Lorna and Skye no longer cares for Chad at the end.
21	21	"Marshal Awe"	Doug Hadders and Adam Rotstein	May 10, 2006
It's basketball season at Carl's school and C2 tries to show his team spirit by disguising himself as Marshall Maple-leaf, the team's self-proclaimed mascot. Meanwhile, Chloe's boyfriend Damien learns that he has a natural talent for basketball and makes the team, but Chloe intends to see her school lose the game.
22	22	"Sibling Rivalry"	George Westerholm	May 24, 2006
After a tree crashes through their bedroom windows, Chloe and Carl must share the living room, until the repairs are done, while C2 spends the time at Jamie's house.
23	23	"Birthday Boys"	Ken Cuperus	June 7, 2006
Expecting a bland and boring party, Carl leaves C2 to be with the family on Carl's birthday, but Carl soon realizes that it's a big, super-cool surprise party.
24	24	"It's A Frog's Life"	Shawn Kalb	June 21, 2006
Carl's science class is dissecting frogs.
25	25	"Carl Pierced"	Dave Dias	July 5, 2006
Carl decides to get his tongue pierced in order to impress Skye only to remember that C2 needs to get one too or they won't be able to switch out anymore.
26	26	"Clone Come Home"	Ken Cuperus	July 19, 2006
Carl gets angry at C2 after he triggers a virus on his computer, erasing all of his files, and most importantly, his blogs. C2 calls the cloning facility and boxes himself up with a "Return to Sender" sticker to get sent back. This episode features many flashbacks from the series.

=== Season 2 (2006–07) ===
No. overall	No. in season	Title	Written by	Original release date
27	1	"Carl Lost"	Shawn Kalb	December 15, 2006
Carl and Jamie decide to go camping out in the woods and out of civilization (also in Jamie's attempt to catch Bigfoot on tape), so C2 is taking Carl's place for his family. But Carl gets lost in the scary dark woods and it's up to Jamie and C2 to save him and bring him home. Meanwhile, Chloe gets sick and demands her parents to take care of her every minute of the day.
28	2	"Night of the Living Clones"	Denis McGrath	May 6, 2007
C2 has his first bad dream when eating too much Halloween candy. Note: Halloween special
29	3	"Carl Super-Sized"	Erika Strobel	January 7, 2007
Thanks to C2, Carl accidentally shreds a very rare copy of a comic book, forcing Carl to either repay Steve (the store's owner) or be banned from the store. Since Carl and Chloe's parents refuse to give a raise in allowance to either of their children, they bribe them: whoever gives them his/her first paycheck gets a raise. Carl gets a job at "Buckineer Burger" (giving C2 the opportunity to work with Lorna) while Chloe runs her own version of an ice cream truck. Meanwhile, Jamie makes a new video news story: "Do Buckineer Burgers beef up your life?"
30	4	"Chairman of the Boarders"	George Westerholm	January 14, 2007
Mr. Agar got the mayor to turn the skatepark into a botanical garden! With Skye's help, Carl organizes a protest to bring back the skatepark. At first, the protest goes great, but then Mr. Agar says that if the botanical garden stays, he will give the students less homework, Skye quits on Carl AND the protests are getting ugly. Will Carl get his skatepark back? Meanwhile, Jamie and C2 desperately try to get Wheels Wallis to sponsor and help with the protest, even if it means doing the deadliest skateboarding move in history.
31	5	"Gone to the Dogs"	Edward Kay	January 21, 2007
Jamie bets that Carl can't function two days without C2. To make this bet interesting, if Jamie wins, he gets Carl's skateboard for a month. If Carl wins, he gets Jamie's camcorder to fool around with for 30 days. It's not easy: Carl has to help out Skye at the dog shelter AND he has a biology test the next day. Meanwhile, Chloe tries out her new hexing spell book, and C2 unleashes his inner dog, with the help of Rex and the pup's friends, during his few days off.
32	6	"Pride Goeth Before a Wipeout"	Ben Joseph	January 28, 2007
C2 beats Carl at virtual snowboarding repeatedly, and eventually also gets the high score, beating out Ron Bronson! Ron later challenges Carl to a virtual snowboarding showdown, so Carl uses his ultimate weapon: C2. But because of Chloe's obsession to get rid of pure white snow, the game busts, leaving C2 with a broken ankle and an excuse for Carl to be respected to the full extent at school. However, his fans discover that his ankle isn't really broken, and when Ron Bronson finds out, he challenges Carl to a REAL snowboarding showdown. Who will win? Meanwhile, Chloe and Damien attempt to get rid of all the white snow, hoping that the rest of winter will be dark and desolate.
33	7	"Lights, Camera, Carl"	Denis McGrath	February 4, 2007
Carl was chosen by Jamie to be part of his zombie movie, but his reactions quickly change when Jamie casts Lorna as Carl's lover. But thankfully, C2 can save Carl...or so Carl thinks. C2 is no match for Carl in terms of acting skills, so Carl now has to choose between kissing Lorna, or giving up on the film and letting down his best friend.
34	8	"Clone Scene Investigation"	Doug Hadders & Adam Rotstein	February 11, 2007
Mr. Agar puts Carl on the school spring dance decorating committee as a punishment for slacking in class. Since Skye is busy lying down in front of bulldozers to protect a nest of burrowing owls, Carl brings in C2 to help with the decorations, so both of them are at school. The mess starts to happen when Chloe and Damien are also put on the committee as punishment. The day even gets strange for Lorna, as she keeps seeing two Carls! Her suspicion of Carl having a clone is further backed-up when she finds his blog! With the help of Jamie, Carl will have to play it smart to get out of this. Meanwhile, Chloe and Damien turns the "Spring has Sprung" dance decorations into destruction and chaos, much to Chloe's satisfaction.
35	9	"Carl's Techno-Jinx"	Bob Ardiel	February 18, 2007
Carl is banned from the library (by a haunting librarian) for a massively overdue book about puberty. Carl has his trusty Internet to finish up a geography assignment due the next day -- not. Carl's computer was busted and when he tried to borrow Chloe and Dr. Mom's computer, both didn't work. The fearful C2 believes that all these grievances is due to the "Crashman Curse" and the librarian. With advice from Chloe, he decides to make a sacrifice in order to be relieved of the curse, Carl's computer.
36	10	"MOM'S DA BOMB!"	Bob Ardiel	May 2, 2007
Carl forgets it's mother's day. C2 had written a story in the newspaper (accidentally putting in C2's name), and wins. He wins the prize of going with his mother to a mother and son spa. Note: Mother's Day special
37	11	"Clone Encounters"	Bob Ardiel	March 25, 2007
C2 gets a feeling he is being watch by something out of this world!
38	12	"Spotlight on Carl" "Teen Superstar Part 1"	Erika Strobel	March 11, 2007
C2 signs Carl up in the " Teen Superstar " contest and Carl must take the stage after hearing C2's horrible singing.
39	13	"The Fame Game" "Teen Superstar Part 2"	Erika Strobel	March 18, 2007
Carl finds that being famous is harder than it looks.

=== Season 3 (2007) ===
No. overall	No. in season	Title	Written by	Original release date
40	1	"Band of Bothers"	Gerald Tripp	June 3, 2007
Carl sends C2 to get ticket's for his favorite band, but after C2 inadvertently breaks them up, Carl becomes the most hated person in town.
41	2	"Where's the Meat?"	Brian Lasenby	June 10, 2007
Carl promises Skye he will become a vegan, Will he keep the promise, or bail and just make C2 keep his promise as usual.
42	3	"Totally Recalled"	Bob Ardiel	June 17, 2007
Carl notices C2 is having malfunctions so he has to take him back to the cloning lab in this hair-raising adventure!
43	4	"Running Into Trouble"	Gerald Tripp	June 24, 2007
After seeing C2 run, the school principal offers him a spot on the football team. Seeing this as an opportunity to get out of trouble, Carl let's C2 join the team, but, while Carl gets all the glory everyone else, C2 is the one taking all the pain.
44	5	"Doomsday"	Pete Sauder	July 1, 2007
C2's doggy biscuits " Kosmic Kible " make C2 able to predict the future. All goes well until his prediction of Doomsday happens. In this episode Carl swears several times, but it gets bleeped out.
45	6	"Mouldy Oldie"	Brian Lasenby	July 8, 2007
After eating a mouldy sandwich in Carl's locker, C2 begins to age exponentially.
46	7	"My Cousin Carlotta"	Pete Sauder	July 15, 2007
After Lorna see Carl and C2 together, Carl has to convince her that his clone is his lookalike cousin, Carlotta.
47	8	"Got Your Back"	Gerald Tripp	July 22, 2007
After seeing too many action movies, C2 becomes paranoid about Carl's well-being.
48	9	"When Good Clones Go Bald"	Bob Ardiel	July 29, 2007
When C2 gets head lice after helping Skye at the animal shelter, both Carl and C2 have to shave their heads.
49	10	"Merry Christmas Granny Crashman"	Pete Sauder	August 5, 2007
It's Christmas time and Carl's grandmother is coming for the holidays. Will she discover Carl's secret? Note: Christmas special
50	11	"Good Deeds Done Dirt Cheap"	Gerald Tripp	August 12, 2007
After C2 rescues a rich old lady's cat, Carl gets the woman to adopt his clone so that he can live like a rich kid.
51	12	"Doggone Flu"	Brian Lasenby	August 19, 2007
The Crashman house is placed under quarantine after Carl sends C2 to school to take his flu shot for him, and the vaccine produces bizarre side effects on C2's doggie DNA.
52	13	"Party Animal"	Pete Sauder	August 26, 2007
Carl wants to show a computer game he has invented to a computer gaming tycoon known as Killahertz.

=== Season 4 (2010–11) ===
No. overall	No. in season	Title	Written by	Original release date
53	1	"No Time for Clones"	Story by : Steve "Funky Chicken" Neilson; Teleplay by : Brian Lasenby	October 3, 2010
C2 drops an olive in his dad's time machine causing an alternate universe.
54	2	"Bear Necessities"	Steve "Funky Chicken" Neilson	October 10, 2010
The Crashman's go on a road trip and end up lost in the woods with a crazy maniac with a chainsaw.
55	3	"Love of the Game"	Aron Dunn	October 17, 2010
A video game creator creates a new game where you make your own avatar and battle others for prize money. Carl is doing great until Skye and him are the final two contestants.
56	4	"Summer Cramp"	Glenn Brown	November 7, 2010
Carl becomes a counsler at a summer camp so he can make a move on Skye one of the other counseler's
57	5	"Rex2Rex"	Brian Lasenby	November 14, 2010
Carl's dog Rex accidentally gets cloned and he can talk.
58	6	"Two Thongs Don't Make it Right"	Gerald Tripp	November 21, 2010
Skye starts a protest for exploiting women at a local contest and somehow Carl gets signed up and has to wear a " sexy " thong.
59	7	"Foreign X-Stranged"	Steve "Funky Chicken" Neilson	November 28, 2010
Carl meets a foreign exchange student.
60	8	"Community Carl"	Hugh Duffy	December 5, 2010
Carl gets into trouble and has to do much community service.
61	9	"Cloned Crusader"	Gerald Tripp	December 12, 2010
C2 becomes a superhero named Zapman.
62	10	"In Carl We Trust"	Brian Lasenby	January 2, 2011
Mr. Agar becomes principal and for some reason he knows about all the bad stuff the students are doing. Everyone blames Carl. Later it is revealed Mr. Agar put a listening device inside Carl's MP3 and that's how he knew everything.
63	11	"Ultra-Marooned Mystery Part 1"	Bob Ardiel	January 9, 2011
Carl steals a boat and throws a party on it. The boat tips and everyone leaves. But Carl, Mr. Agar, Chloe, Jamie, Janet, Barney, Damion, Renee, C2, and Lorna are still on it. Someone cuts the anchor rope and they all get marooned on an island. Teletoon viewers were asked to go to the website and try to discover who cut the rope. It is later revealed who it was.
64	12	"Ultra-Marooned Mystery Part 2"	Bob Ardiel	January 16, 2011
A mystery episode. Watch to find out the mystery!
65	13	"Salem Clone Hunt"	Brian Lasenby	January 23, 2011
The cloning lab makes an announcement that it will offer human cloning to the public. Skye decides to start an anti-cloning movement. But how will she reacts when she learns that Carl already has a clone?

== Production ==
Development of the series began in 2002, with an expected budget of $450,000 per episode. At the time, the commissioning broadcaster was Family Channel, and it was uncertain whether the first season would have 13 or 26 episodes. Family remained the original network for the upcoming show well into 2003.

Teletoon's vice president of programming described the series as sharing a sense of humour with the popular earlier Teletoon original What's with Andy?.

== Release ==
=== Broadcast ===
Aside from Teletoon, in Canada, the series aired reruns on Cartoon Network. It has also aired on numerous other channels in over 100 countries. In Australia, the show was initially broadcast on ABC1 and ABC2, and later on ABC3 as well.

In the United States, it was shown on Animania HD, Kabillion and the Spanish-language channel ¡Sorpresa!. In Latin America and Brazil, the series aired on Cartoon Network and HBO Family.

=== Streaming ===
Some, but not all, of the first season was made available by the distributor Portfolio Entertainment on the company's YouTube channel on June 22, 2017. More episodes from the first and second seasons were added on September 13.

As of September 28, Amazon Video also carries the show via Kid Genius Cartoons Plus!, spanning the first two seasons and part of the third.

The entire series has been released on Tubi TV. However, the episodes are out of order.
