= List of The Cat in the Hat Knows a Lot About That! episodes =

The Cat in the Hat Knows a Lot About That! is an animated musical educational children's television series feature starring Martin Short as The Cat in the Hat. It is based on Random House's Beginner Books franchise and The Cat in the Hat's Learning Library, (itself based on the 1957 children's book The Cat in the Hat) and was produced by Portfolio Entertainment, Random House Children Entertainment, and Collingwood O'Hare Productions, in conjunction with KQED, PBS, Treehouse TV, and Kids' CBC. The series premiered on Treehouse TV in Canada on August 7, 2010, also airing on YTV and Nickelodeon Canada on weekday mornings from 2012 to 2013, and on PBS Kids and PBS Kids Preschool Block in the US on September 6, 2010. It went on hiatus from June 23, 2015 to March 2, 2018. The series finale aired on October 14, 2018.

During the course of the series, 80 episodes of The Cat in the Hat Knows a Lot About That! aired over three seasons.

== Series overview ==
Season	Episodes	Originally released	
Season	Episodes	First released	Last released
1	40	September 6, 2010	September 17, 2012
2	20	September 10, 2012	June 23, 2015
3	20	March 2, 2018	October 14, 2018
Specials	5	November 21, 2012	December 26, 2016

== Episodes ==
=== Season 1 (2010–12) ===
No. overall	No. in season	Title	Lesson(s)	Original release date	Prod. code
1a	1a	"Show Me the Honey"	Bees and nectar collection	September 6, 2010	1/101a
When Sally and Nick run out of honey, the Cat knows just where to go to get more. They visit Queen Priscilla Buzzoo, the honey bee who invites them to join in the honey dance to learn how to make honey.
1b	1b	"Migration Vacation"	Bird migration	September 6, 2010	1/101b
In Sally's backyard, the purple martin has gone missing—and with the help of a variety of forest creatures, The Cat takes Nick and Sally to track down the bird; it teaches them how and why birds migrate.
2a	2a	"I Love the Nightlife"	Nocturnal animals	September 7, 2010	2/102a
When Nick wants to stay awake all night, the Cat takes Nick and Sally to Wagamaroo on a nocturnal adventure to see a variety of night animals (such as a bat, an owl and an opossum).
2b	2b	"Oh Give Me a Home"	Hermit crabs	September 7, 2010	2/102b
Nick has a super-duper special shell and Sally also has one—The Cat in the Hat takes them on an adventure to the beach where they meet Tucker, the hermit crab, who is also looking for a new shell because he's grown too big for him, both Tucker and Sally now have super duper special shells at a seaside fashion show in its first edition.
3a	3a	"Many Ants Make Light Work"	How ants work together	September 8, 2010	3/103a
Nick and Sally are trying to put up a tent in their backyard but it's not working: Nick is pulling when Sally is pushing and it's just making a giant heap. Good thing the Cat knows millions of friends like ants who are experts at teamwork; he takes the kids to visit an ant colony. In the colony, Nick and Sally learn teamwork makes almost anything possible.
3b	3b	"Nest Best Thing"	How robins build their nests	September 8, 2010	3/103b
Nick and Sally have found some bird eggs in their backyard, but their nest is destroyed... until the Cat finds out the place that they are going to keep them. He takes them to meet an expert nest builder, Mrs. Robin the robin who shows the children how to build a nest especially for the homeless eggs.
4a	4a	"A Plan for Sand"	Camels	September 9, 2010	4/104a
Nick and Sally are playing in their sandbox but there isn't enough room for them to build their sandcastles. The Cat takes them to the biggest sandbox ever made and meet Carmela the camel. She teaches them about how camels are adapted to live in the dry, sandy climate.
4b	4b	"Whale Music"	Whales	September 9, 2010	4/104b
Nick and Sally make a song to their moms but can't get the end almost right. The Cat takes them to meet the best singing teacher in the world who is Humphrey the humpback whale. While bobbing in the ocean, Humphrey teaches the kids that whales communicate by singing—and that it's not how you sing that matters but what you're saying in song. Back home, Nick and Sally delight their moms with their song production.
5a	5a	"Flower Power"	Flowers	September 10, 2010	5/105a
When her mom has a cold, Sally wants to pick some colorful flowers to make her feel better. The Cat in the Hat takes Nick and Sally to the forest of Flora-Fah-Zoom where they meet three different creatures, like a hummingbird, a litter frog, and a butterfly that all depend on flowers to live. Sally decides to make her mother a picture of the flowers they have encountered in Flora-Fah-Zoom instead of picking a flower that animals need in order to survive.
5b	5b	"Snowman's Land"	Water and ice	September 10, 2010	5/105b
Sally and Nick have just finished making a statue of the Cat in the Hat out of snow, but it's starting to melt... Good thing the Cat knows where to take the melting snowman in the cold and snowy north: in the arctic, the kids skate on a frozen lake, make snow sculptures, and learn that water can freeze and melt when it's cold or warm outside. Because it's getting warmer back home, they leave their snowman sculpture there so they can come back and visit him along their way.
6a	6a	"Dress Up Day"	Silkworms	September 13, 2010	6/106a
Nick and Sally are playing dress-up but something's wrong with it: Sally's princess dress has torn (and Sally's mom doesn't have any silk thread to fix it). The Cat takes them to see his good friend Mindy, the silkworm who shows them how she makes silk by leaving out the cocoon. Sally uses the silk thread to fix the "swirly-twirly" princess dress to finish dress-up.
6b	6b	"Bathtime"	How different animals clean themselves	September 13, 2010	6/106b
Nick and Sally have been playing in the mud, and now they need to get clean. The Cat in the Hat knows some friends who have some very wonderful ways to bathe. In Bana Bana Savanah, they meet three different animals, like a lion, a sparrow, and a hippopotamus who all keep clean in very different ways. Even though it's fun to try bathing the way the animals do, Sally and Nick decide that good old soap and water works best for them!
7a	7a	"Tree's Company"	Tree-dwelling animals	September 14, 2010	7/107a
Sally and Nick are playing up in their tree house when Nick's mom calls them in for lunch: Nick wonders what it would be like to stay up in that tree all the time... The Cat in the Hat knows, or at least he has friends especially (a capuchin monkey, a tree frog and a boa snake). In the Jimmer-Jammer Jungle the kids learn how different animals spend their entire lives in trees and so there's one thing those trees don't have—especially coming in.
7b	7b	"Now You See Me"	Animal camouflage	September 14, 2010	7/107b
Nick and Sally play hide-and-seek but Sally keeps getting found. The Cat takes the kids to meet the best hider ever, his friend Mr. Gecko, the gecko: through a game of hide-and-go-seek in the jungle, the kids learn how Mr. Gecko not only hides, but how he runs and climbs. Now Sally knows how to camouflage herself so she isn't found—as usual.
8a	8a	"The Rain Game"	Layers of a rainforest	September 15, 2010	8/108a
Sally wants to water the plants in the backyard, but it's hot and sunny outside—they need rain and lots of it... until it's good thing the Cat in the Hat who knows exactly where to go to get some: the tropical rain forest. In it, with the assistance of some toucans and the singing of howler monkeys, they explore each level of the rain forest, eventually reaching the top and the rain.
8b	8b	"No Sssweater Is Better"	Molting of snakes	September 15, 2010	8/108b
Nick has grown out of his favorite sweater and he doesn't want to part with it. The Cat in the Hat has a friend with the exact same problem. He brings them to meet Slyde the coral snake who shows Nick and Sally how he sheds his skin when it gets too small for him.
9a	9a	"A Tale About Tails"	How different animals use their tails	September 16, 2010	9/109a
Nick and Sally are playing Pin the Tail on the Donkey, when they wish they had tails of their own. Luckily, the Cat knows a lot about tails and brings them to the Jungle of Wagga-Tag-Tail where they meet a number of animals with very different tails (such as a squirrel monkey, a quetzal and a rattlesnake). With the help of an ingenious machine, Nick and Sally get to test out all of these tails for themselves and they learn that different tails can do different things.
9b	9b	"Sticky Situation"	North American beaver dams	September 16, 2010	9/109b
Sally and Nick are playing the drums on overturned buckets when Nick breaks his drumstick. The Cat knows someone who is a stick expert, his friend Betty, the beaver, who finds Nick the perfect drumstick, but when the dam springs a leak, Nick, Sally and the Cat help Betty fix it, using Nick's new stick. Instead of a stick, Nick learns an even better way to drum: using a home-made beaver tail—as expected.
10a	10a	"Night Lights"	Fireflies	September 17, 2010	10/110a
Nick and Sally are making shadow puppets with the Cat in the Hat but the batteries in the flashlight have gone out... they jump into the Thingamajigger and shrink down to visit the fireflies that live in the backyard. They learn that the fireflies communicate by flashing their lights. When the fireflies provide the light the kids need, the shadow puppet show can continue as expected.
10b	10b	"Go Snails Go!"	Snails' shells	September 17, 2010	10/110b
Nick, Sally and the Cat have been invited along on a snail expedition and they jump into the Thingamajigger and shrink down to meet up with Lewis and Clark, the two snails that lead the way... through the forest of Slippity-Goo (a place with fun sliding in their own makeshift shells), the kids learn about all the different ways snails use their shells.
11a	11a	"Flight of the Penguin"	Penguins	September 27, 2010	11/111a
Sally and Nick are pretending to fly in their backyard... if they really were going to be zooming and swooshing like a bird. The Cat in the Hat brings them to meet his good friend Percy the penguin. After a fun race with a penguin and a seagull, the kids learn that not all birds fly, but that doesn't mean they can't go zooming and swooshing.
11b	11b	"Let's Go Fly a Kite!"	Wind power	September 27, 2010	11/111b
Sally, Nick and the Cat are trying to fly a kite but don't have enough wind. The Cat in the Hat takes them to Huff-Puff-Maguff where there's so much wind, their kite gets away from them... until they chase the runaway kite, using the wind to help them. When they finally reach it, the breeze helps to cool them down—as expected.
12a	12a	"You Should Be Dancing"	Birds-of-paradise	October 22, 2010	12/112a
Nick and Sally are planning to put on a show for their moms but can't finish the dance without falling down. The Cat in the Hat takes them to meet one of the best dancers in the world, Tango, a bird-of-paradise. With a few costume-changes and a little practice, Nick and Sally are finally able to show their moms without falling down their new dance.
12b	12b	"Batty for Bats"	Bats and animal echolocation	October 22, 2010	12/112b
Sally and Nick are playing a game of blindfolded tags but can't seem to find each other. Luckily, the Cat has a friend who is always able to find his way in the dark. He takes them to meet Zapata, a bat who teaches the kids about animal echolocation. Now that Nick and Sally know how to listen to find their way, the blindfold tag has become a lot more fun as expected.
13a	13a	"Maps"	Maps	October 25, 2010	13/113a
Nick and Sally pretend to be pirates until the Cat takes them on a "real" pirate adventure by following a treasure map, using landmarks to find their way to a real pirate treasure: parchment paper and ink pens to make pirate maps of their own in the ship.
13b	13b	"Termite Towers"	Termites	October 25, 2010	13/113b
When Sally and Nick can't keep their block tower from toppling over, The Cat in the Hat takes them to meet expert tower builders: the termites who, after shrinking down to bug-size, learn from Terry, the termite, how to build a tower that doesn't wiggle (not even wobbling at the same time). However, Raymond, the mole-rat keeps knocking over the termite mound... with some engineering tips from a termite, Sally and Nick can build their block tower higher than before as expected.
14a	14a	"The Lost Egg"	Bowerbirds	November 22, 2010	14/114a
Sally and Nick are decorating the tree house for a party. The Cat knows the world's most fabulous decorator: Stanley, the bowerbird, who teaches the kids how to decorate with quite anything (such as shells, leaves and pebbles). Now they can have a party in their own fabulously decorated tree house as usual.
14b	14b	"Hold on Tight"	Limpets	November 22, 2010	14/114b
Nick is trying to hang onto the monkey bars but can't. The Cat takes him and Sally to meet the best gripper, his tiny little friend Larry, the limpet. After shrinking down to limpet size, Nick and Sally learn how to hang onto the rocks with the help of natural hand and footholds, some sticky stuff on their feet and plain old perseverance. Now Nick knows that in order to stay on the monkey bars, he needs to keep trying.
15a	15a	"Jump!"	Animals that jump	November 23, 2010	15/115a
Nick and Sally are trying to jump high enough to get their balloon stuck up in a tree but can't do it. Good thing the Cat in the Hat knows some of the best jumpers ever, and they are off to Jumpalaroo to learn how to jump from nature's masters which are grasshoppers, a kangaroo, and even a flea.
15b	15b	"Slow Down for Sloths"	Sloths	November 23, 2010	15/115b
Nick and Sally are trying to draw a picture of a prepona butterfly but can't get close enough to see it. The Cat takes the kids to meet Onslow the sloth, who teaches them that when you slow down, the world comes to you. After lots of practice and also the race to see who's the slowest, Nick and Sally are now able to slow down enough to get closer to the butterfly and finish their picture—even though all is just well.
16a	16a	"Chasing Rainbows"	Rainbows	December 17, 2010	16/116a
Nick and Sally are painting a picture of a rainbow but don't know what are the colors that are used for the picture. The Cat takes them to Color-ga-lore to meet King Kaleidoscope, an expert on rainbows: a song teaches them the proper color order and after that a silly spray of water leads them to discover how to make their very own rainbow.
16b	16b	"Follow the Prints"	Animal footprints	December 17, 2010	16/116b
Nick and Sally have a backyard picnic when they discover their last strawberry has gone missing... and the Cat doesn't know who is it—his friend Cluey Looey can help them and they are off to Muddyfeet Waterhole where they learn about how the differently shaped feet, paws, or hooves of various animals make differently shaped footprints (like an elephant, a bee-eater and a baboon). Back home, they follow the prints and discover their strawberry was taken by a squirrel and, luckily, the Cat has more to discover.
17a	17a	"Reindeer Games"	Reindeer antlers	December 20, 2010	17/117a
Nick and Sally can't find their sled, buried under the snow. The Cat takes Nick and Sally to the Jingly Bell Forest to see Magnus, the reindeer, who is great at finding things in the snow. In it, Magnus shows them how he digs with his feet and shovels snow with his antlers. When Nick and Sally find Magnus' old antlers, they can shovel snow now and also find their sled. Meanwhile, Fish tries to find the perfect Christmas tree.
17b	17b	"Along Came a Spider"	Spider webs	December 20, 2010	17/117b
Nick and Sally are playing soccer when their ball goes through a hole in their net. Luckily, the Cat's friend Mabel is a spider who knows all about weaving—maybe she can help them. Mabel, with the help of Cat and a song, teaches Nick and Sally how to weave a web. Back at home, they use Mabel's advice and fix their net, and just in time for Cat to score a goal, if only if it wasn't sticky.
18a	18a	"A Long Winter's Nap"	Bear hibernation	January 17, 2011	18/118a
Sally and Nick are so excited to go ice skating tomorrow, that they can't fall asleep. The Cat's friend Boris the bear can help. Off they go to the Gleep-sneep Woods to learn how Boris gets ready to take his long winter's nap. Back at home, Nick and Sally follow Boris' advice, and follow their own bedtime routine to get ready for bed. With the help of a bedtime story from Cat, they quickly fall asleep.
18b	18b	"The Tree Doctor"	Tree growth	January 17, 2011	18/118b
Sally's little maple sapling hasn't grown any bigger. To discover why, the Cat in the Hat takes the kids to meet Dr. Twiggles. With the help of the tree doctor and his songs, Nick and Sally discover how trees eat through their leaves and roots. They also learn that trees grow very slowly. A few more years later, their maple sapling will grow into a maple tree.
19a	19a	"Pick Your Friends"	How animals help each other	February 11, 2011	19/119a
It's Valentine's Day and Nick and Sally disagree hotly on how to decorate the card they're making for the Cat. This means they aren't really best friends—The Cat takes them to meet Sheldon, a tortoise who knows all about friendship. They learn that Sheldon's best friend, a finch is completely different from him and that being best friends doesn't mean you always have to agree.
19b	19b	"Finola's Farm"	Dairy products	February 11, 2011	19/119b
Nick and Sally are sitting down to breakfast but have run out of milk. The Cat arrives to take them to Finola's Farm to have breakfast with Finola. First they learn how to milk a cow, then they discover that the milk from cattle can be made into butter, cheese, and ice cream, and even into other derivates.
20a	20a	"Incredible Journey"	Salmon	March 2, 2011	20/120a
Nick and Sally are playing in their homemade Thingamajigger, when the Cat arrives to take them on a real adventure. Off they go to meet Samantha, the salmon who is returning to the pool where she hatches so she can lay her eggs. With the help of the Subber-e-blubber, they follow Samantha underwater, upriver on her incredible journey.
20b	20b	"Bamboozled"	Bamboo	March 2, 2011	21/121b
Sally needs to find a gift for her stuffed panda, Pammy. She discovers who better to ask than a real panda... The Cat takes them to meet Zhu Zhu, a giant panda who helps the kids to discover all the wonderful things you can do with her favorite food, bamboo. Bamboo turns out to be a perfect gift for Pammy.
21a	21a	"A Teeny Weeny Adventure"	Types of cells	March 2, 2011	21/121a
Nick has spotted a tiny ladybug, but Sally has found an even smaller ant. There's nothing smaller than an ant, or is there... The Cat takes Nick and Sally to meet a variety of single-celled creatures, which are a paramecium, a diatom, and an amoeba, which are the smallest anywhere. Nick and Sally soon learn that a drop of water holds a whole lot more than they ever realized.
21b	21b	"I See Seeds"	Seeds	March 2, 2011	21/121b
Sally and Nick are going on an adventure, but they just can't decide until the Cat suggests they see how trees send their seeds on trips. They follow different seeds, like a maple tree, a gorse bush, and a greater burdock, as they travel through the air, float on the water and hitch rides on animals.
22a	22a	"Thump!"	Rabbits' senses	April 11, 2011	22/122a
Nick is trying to make his mother a surprise lunch, but she keeps coming into the kitchen. If only there was a way for him to know when she was coming—The Cat takes Nick and Sally to meet his friend Twitch the rabbit. Twitch and her bunnies teach Nick and Sally how to stop, look and listen for danger, especially a fox. Now that Sally can warn Nick when his mom is coming, they're able to surprise her with lunch!
22b	22b	"Squirreled Away"	Squirrels' storage skills	April 11, 2011	22/122b
Nick can't remember where he put his yo-yo. The Cat offers to take the kids to meet his friend Bucky the squirrel who is good at both hiding and finding things. Nick and Sally learn how to use landmarks to help them remember where they put things. Back at home, Nick (thinking like Bucky) is able to track down his yo-yo.
23a	23a	"Surprise Surprise!"	Armadillos	July 18, 2011	23/123a
Nick and Sally just can't learn to do a somersault. The Cat takes Nick and Sally to see the Cat's friend, Luis the armadillo, who (luckily) is "the king of the pill bugs". But when they find Luis, they learn that he only rolls when he gets surprised. They take turns trying to surprise him, and when they finally do, they're the ones surprised when they learn that not only can Luis roll, but he can even run underwater. Back at home, they follow Luis' advice and are now able to somersault.
23b	23b	"A Howling Good Time"	Wolf communication	July 18, 2011	23/123b
Nick and Sally pretend to be lost adventurers when Sally wonders what to do if you really do get lost. The Cat in the Hat knows a wolf pup who knows all about getting lost and found. In the Hooty Howly Woods Grayson shows them how wolves howl to communicate and to find each other. Now Sally and Nick know one thing to do if they get lost as they should howl for mom.
24a	24a	"Secret Super Digger"	Compost	September 5, 2011	24/124a
Sally is trying to grow a flower for her mom, but it just won't grow. At Finola's Farm, she introduces the Cat, Sally and Nick to her secret super digger: Diggery the earthworm. Diggery shows them how plant roots need water air and compost, which Diggery helps to make. Sally's flower is sure to grow once she gets some of her own secret super diggers to help.
24b	24b	"Pucker Up and Blow"	Wrens	September 5, 2011	24/124b
Nick and Sally are trying to whistle but they just can't seem to get it right. The Cat takes them to visit his friend, Rocky the winter wren, who is an expert whistler. Rocky, and his son Ricky, offer this advice: if you want to whistle, start with one note and practice.
25a	25a	"Sniff and Seek"	Skunks	October 20, 2011	25/125a
Nick's most favorite smell is chocolate chip cookies but, of Sally's, is unsure. However, it makes a better way to find out than by playing sniff-and-seek with a skunk. The Cat introduces Nick and Sally to Whiffy, and in the adventure of finding Sally's favorite smell they discover how good Whiffy is at protecting himself with his very own special smell.
25b	25b	"Aye Aye!"	The aye-aye	October 20, 2011	26/126a
Nick and Sally are making Halloween masks, but they want to make them really scary. Cat takes them to meet Aiya, the aye-aye, in the forest of Spookywoowoo. Aiya shows them, that even though he may look scary—his big ears, huge eyes and long fingers help him to find food. Now Nick and Sally know just how to make their masks scary as usual.
26a	26a	"Trick or Treat"	Animals that love fruit	October 21, 2011	31/131a
It's Halloween and The Cat in the Hat takes Sally and Nick trick or treating his way. Around the world they go, meeting three new friends, like a fruit bat, a coconut crab, and a spider monkey who teach them each of the tricks they do and share the treats that they like to eat. Back at home Nick and Sally are ready to go trick or treating, with plenty of new tricks to share.
26b	26b	"King Cecil the Seahorse"	Male seahorses	October 21, 2011	26/126b
Sally is off to fight the "dragon"—however, Nick wants to go, he doesn't want to stay and watch the baby princess, he wants to go on an adventure. The Cat explains that babies can be part of the adventure. They don't want to go and meet King Cecil the seahorse, he takes all his babies wherever he goes. Nick and Sally discover that taking care of babies is much more fun than fighting dragons.
27a	27a	"Blue Feet Are Neat!"	Blue-footed booby birds	November 7, 2011	27/127a
Nick and Sally are trying out their new blue rubber boots but they keep getting stuck in the mud. The Cat knows just who can help them–Buster, the blue-footed booby. Buster is only too happy to show them how his wide, flat blue feet help him move easily over the muddy shore. With Cat's help to make their boots wide and flat, Sally and Nick can now walk across the mud without getting stuck, just like Buster.
27b	27b	"Reef Magic"	Distraction techniques of sea creatures	November 7, 2011	27/127b
Nick has difficulty learning a disappearing magic trick, when who should appear but The Cat in the Hat. He takes Nick and Sally to the coral reef of Scoobamareen. There they learn that distraction is a great way for some sea creatures, like a sea cucumber, a squid, and a pufferfish who use distracting tricks on predators, like a barracuda. To hide themselves from other fish who might be looking for a bite to eat. Back at home, Nick and Sally use what they learned to make their stuffed panda disappear.
28a	28a	"Digging the Deep"	Ocean layers	November 8, 2011	28/128a
Nick and Sally are exploring how deep they can dig in the sandbox. The Cat arrives to whisk them away to the deepest place he knows–the bottom of the Swirly Whirly Ocean. They meet up with Aurilia the anglerfish who guides them to the very bottom of the ocean floor. Now that they've gone as deep as deep can be, it's off to find the next adventure.
28b	28b	"Puddle Puzzle"	Water cycle	November 8, 2011	28/128b
Nick and Sally are excited to jump in the giant puddle in their backyard–but it's gone. Discovering where it went... with the help of Cat's Seussian camera, they see that the puddle has turned into water vapor, which makes it the water cycle. Off they go to the Bluey Blue Sky to follow their puddle. They discover that the water vapor rises high into the sky, then cools off and falls as rain. They go back home and are delighted to see that their puddle is back.
29a	29a	"Help with Kelp"	Kelp forests	November 9, 2011	29/129a
It's Fish's birthday and Nick and Sally want to get him a special present. The Cat's friend Gary the garibaldi fish might have an idea. They off to the Briny Blue Sea where they meet a variety of creatures in a kelp forest who use the kelp for both food and protection. Then, the sea otter eats the sea urchin in order to protect the kelp. Back at home, they make a picture of the kelp forest for Fish. It's the best present that he could ever hope for.
29b	29b	"Treetop Tom"	Giraffes	November 9, 2011	29/129b
Nick and Sally are playing when their ball gets caught up high in the branches of a tree, but they wish they were tall. Being tall is something Cat's friend Treetop Tom knows all about. They meet the giraffe in the So Sunny Savannah, and with the help of Cat's tallerizers, Nick and Sally are as tall as Tom. They soon learn that being small has its benefits, and luckily, Cat has stilts so he can get their ball out of the tree back at home.
30a	30a	"Minnie the Meerkat"	Meerkats	November 21, 2011	30/130a
Sally and Nick are planning to camp out in the backyard, but they hear some scary noises out there. So as not to worry, The Cat's friend Minnie the meerkat can teach them all about camping safely. Off to Peekaboo Plains where a group of meerkats show them how they make their camp safe every night. Now Sally and Nick know what to do to feel safe in the backyard. And it doesn't hurt to have the best lookout ever: The Cat.
30b	30b	"Leaves"	Leaves	November 21, 2011	30/130b
Nick and Sally are going to make a leaf collage of Cat, but the leaves they have aren't in the right shape, they need different ones. The Cat takes Nick and Sally to Kaloo-Kalee to do some leaf collecting. At Kaloo-Kalee, they learn that leaves help trees make food, and that's why it's best not to pick the leaves from the branches. They collect fallen leaves from three different trees like a raffia palm, an evergreen tree, and a ginkgo tree with very different leaves. Now they have everything they need to make their picture of the Cat, and even one for Fish.
31a	31a	"Hooray for Hair!"	Animals' hair uses	December 19, 2011	31/131a
Sally and Nick are getting their hair cut today, maybe they should try new hairstyles. A trip to meet three of Cat's friends (and some styling help from the Wig-o-lator) will help them decide: first, Nick and Sally shouldn't have yak hair, because it is too hot—the hair of a fur seal is too short (not quite) for them, and of a porcupine is "no way" for them; and "how will they ever get a hug from their moms with hair that spiky" is that they decide that the hair they have is what's perfect for them.
31b	31b	"Ice Is Nice"	Polar bears and types of ice	December 19, 2011	31/131b
Nick and Sally want some nice cold lemonade, but there's no more ice cubes in Sally's fridge. To fix the problem, the Cat takes them to Freeze-your-knees Snowland. They meet Cat's friend Polly the polar bear who introduces Sally and Nick to all the different kinds of ice that make up her home. After trying many types of ice, they find the kind that will be perfect for their lemonade.
32a	32a	"Be Cool"	How desert creatures stay cool	January 3, 2012	27/127a
Nick and Sally can't stay cool because it's hot outside. The Cat suggests that they should visit some friends in the Dizzle-dazzle Desert to learn how to keep cool. They learn that some animals like a desert iguana, who show them how to stay cool are light-colored. Some stay out of the sun like a jackrabbit. Some like Tommy the coolest desert toad around, just move slow. Nick and Sally take their advice, but Cat has an even better idea, which they would run through a sprinkler.
32b	32b	"Elephant Walk"	Elephants' trunks	January 3, 2012	32/32b
Nick and Sally are building a toy construction set when they wonder if there's such a thing as a one-thing-does-it-all tool. The Cat knows just who to visit to find out: Themba the African elephant, and her daughter Efia, show the Cat and the kids all the different things their trunks can do. Nick and Sally realize that elephant trunks are just like hands, so they already have a one-thing-does-it-all tool.
33a	33a	"A Sweet Deal"	Honeyguides	February 7, 2012	33/133a
Sally and Nick are having a hard time getting customers to come to their pickle restaurant. The Cat takes them to meet Eddy the honeyguide. Eddy shows them how he guides humans to bees' nests by making noise and putting on a show. Back at home, Sally and Nick follow Eddy's example and proudly serve their first customer.
33b	33b	"The King of Swing"	Chimpanzees	February 7, 2012	33/133b
Swinging from a rope is difficult for Nick and Sally. Good thing the Cat knows the king of swing, Charlie the chimpanzee. In the Leafylafoo Rainforest, Charlie teaches them how to use their hands and feet to swing as they help him search for his favorite food: bananas. Back at home, Sally and Nick mimic Charlie and swing across the backyard to where Cat has a surprise snack: bananas, waiting for them.
34a	34a	"Spring and Summer"	Spring and summer	March 6, 2012	34/134a
For Show and Tell at school, Nick and Sally must bring something from their favorite season and they choose which is their favorite. The Cat in the Hat takes them to the magical Garden of Seasons, where they can visit any season they like, any time they like. They meet three young animals, like a Canada goose, a snowshoe hare, and a wood frog and journey with them as they begin to grow up. Sally decides that she has two favorite seasons, and with the pictures taken from the Snaparama camera, she now has a scrapbook of pictures to show why.
34b	34b	"Fall and Winter"	Autumn and winter	March 6, 2012	34/134b
After the previous segment, it's Nick's turn to choose a favorite season. The Cats, Nick and Sally, are back to the Garden of Seasons. This time, they visit Fall and Winter. In Fall, they meet up with their friends from Spring and Summer to have a going away party for Candy the Canada goose who's about to fly south. In Winter, they have a great time playing with Sam the snowshoe hare while all his other friends hibernate. Nick can't decide on just one season, so he makes a picture of all the fun they had in both seasons.
35a	35a	"When I Grow Up"	Animal maturity	March 8, 2012	35/135a
Sally and Nick are trying to guess what they'll be when they grow up when the Cat drops in for a visit. The Cat makes sure that Nick and Sally will never guess what his friend Puggle will be when she grows up. When they see her, they guess it's a beaver. They discover that, while Puggle may have some similarities to other creatures, she will grow up to be a platypus.
35b	35b	"Doing It Differently"	Animals and their environments	March 8, 2012	35/135b
Nick and Sally can't seem to find Harvey the guinea pig, they are the only way to find the Cat in the Hat instead. The Cat suggests that Sally and Nick might find Harvey by meeting three friends who always do things differently–like an ostrich (the one that can't fly), a swimming ocelot, or a mudskipper (the one that can walk on the mud). Nick and Sally are sure to find Harvey now by doing it differently.
36a	36a	"Super Cleaner-Uppers"	Natural garbage	April 9, 2012	36/136a
Nick and Sally are cleaning up the backyard when they come across a yucky apple core. The Cat in the Hat takes them to see Sandy the sand hopper (the best cleaner-upper to be there). Sandy teaches them the difference between natural garbage and man-made trash, and how some animals use the natural garbage as food. Back at home, they put the trash in a garbage bag, and the apple core in the garden for Wriggles the earthworm to enjoy.
36b	36b	"Itty Bitty Water"	Water conservation	April 9, 2012	36/136b
Nick and Sally are about to dump out the water in their kiddie pool when The Cat stops them–water is too precious to waste even a drop. Off they go to the Drippety Dry Desert to meet three creatures, like a jerboa, a desert hedgehog, and a sand grouse who are experts at conserving water. Back at home, they think of other ways to use the water in the pool instead of just dumping it out–just like giving Cat a bath.
37a	37a	"Amazing Eyes"	Eyes	April 12, 2012	37/137a
Sally and Nick are trying to guess which game Harvey the guinea pig might like to play with them. The Cat takes them to meet his friend Katie the cavy. But when they try to ask her, she playfully runs off. With the help of three different animals, like a condor, a rainbow boa, and a llama which have very different ways of seeing, they finally find Katie and discover a guinea pig's favorite game: hide and seek.
37b	37b	"Water Walkers"	Water striders	April 12, 2012	37/137b
Nick and Sally are waiting for Mom to come back so they can play in the pool. The Cat suggests that playing on water is even more fun—a trip to Splishy Splashy Pond to meet Walker the water strider will show them. Walker shows how he's able to stay on top of the water with the help of air bubbles as he journeys to the other side of the pond. Back at home, Sally and Nick are ready travel to the other side of the pool.
38a	38a	"Flutter by Butterfly"	Monarch butterflies	June 8, 2012	38/138a
Nick and Sally are bad at being butterflies. The Cat takes them to see Bernardette the monarch butterfly. Bernardette teaches them how to flutter.
38b	38b	"Pretty in Pink"	Flamingos	June 8, 2012	38/138b
Nick and Sally want to learn the cool moves the Cat does. The Cat takes Nick and Sally to the Gooney Goon Lagoon to see Pinky the flamingo.
39a	39a	"Stripy Safari"	Animal stripes	September 14, 2012	39/139a
Nick and Sally set off on a safari with The Cat in the Hat to find all kinds of stripes. Along the way, Sally and Nick discover that stripes mean different things to different animals–the stripes of Jake the coral snake tells other animals to stay away, and Zelda and Zoran's zebra stripes help them to identify each other. Best of all, they meet a desert chipmunk, Rocky Mountain iris, and a bumblebee and the Cat discovers that his stripes are just right for him.
39b	39b	"Wool"	Making wool	September 14, 2012	39/139b
Nick wants to learn how to knit a scarf like Sally, but they've run out of wool. A visit to Finola's Farm is the perfect place to get more. The Cat, Nick and Sally have fun helping Finola get the wool from Feleecia the sheep and then turning it into yarn. Now Sally can teach Nick how to knit his own scarf.
40a	40a	"Big Cats"	Big cats	September 17, 2012	30/140a
When Sally and Nick have difficulty sneaking up on Nick's Mom to surprise her, The Cat brings them to meet some great sneakers—three big cats in particular. The kids learn to be patient from a snow leopard, speedy from a cheetah, and the trick of distraction from a lion. Back in Nick's yard they sneak up on his mom and surprise her. Then Nick and Sally are surprised when the best sneaker sneaks up on them for The Cat.
40b	40b	"Fantastic Flour"	The process of making flour	September 17, 2012	40/140b
Nick and Sally are making their "Best Ever Yummy For Your Tummy" muffins when they realize they don't have enough flour. The Cat takes Nick and Sally to Finola's farm to get more. With help from the Cat, Sally, Nick, and the Things, Finola harvests the wheat then shows them how to turn it into flour. Now that they have enough flour, they can finish making their muffins. Note: This is the first season finale.

=== Season 2 (2012–15) ===
No. overall	No. in season	Title	Lesson(s)	Original release date	Prod. code
41a	1a	"Jumping on the Moon"	Gravity	September 10, 2012	41/201a
Nick and Sally are trying to jump high enough to touch the Moon. However, gravity is — according to the Cat — "what goes up must come down"; to show them just what gravity is, that means a trip to the Moon. That's where they meet Astronaut Audrey who takes them for a space walk to learn all about gravity.
41b	1b	"Sneezy Riders"	Sneeze	September 10, 2012	41/201b
Sally and Nick are playing hide and seek, but Nick keeps sneezing. Good thing the Cat's friend Cluey Looey will be able to help them. The Cat takes Nick and Sally to Muddyfeet Waterhole to find the Cat's friend Cluey Looey (able to help them), where they discover that Louie is having the same problem: nothing a trip inside Louie's nose can't solve. Inside a super shrunken Thingamajigger, Nick, Sally and Cat discover a dog hair which causes sneezing and what they can do to avoid it from happening.
42a	2a	"No Night Today"	Day and night	September 11, 2012	42/202a
Nick and Sally want to keep playing, but it's getting dark. The Cat takes Nick and Sally to see Astronaut Audrey, who answers why does nighttime have to come. With a trip to her space station and a large model of the Solar System, the children learn that it's the Earth's spinning near the Sun that makes it night or day.
42b	2b	"Fun in the Sun"	How hippos use sunscreen to have fun in the sun	September 11, 2012	42/202b
It's too hot to play outside, not according to the Cat: The Cat's friend Hilda the hippopotamus knows all about having fun in the sun. A visit to Muddymoo River teaches them that hippos make their very own sunscreen to protect them from the hot sun. Now that they all have their sunscreen on, it's time for some fun in the sun.
43a	3a	"Bounce"	Rubber	September 12, 2012	43/203a
Nick and Sally are wondering why their ball is so bouncy. Fish tells them because it's made from rubber, and rubber comes from trees. The Cat is about to ask the expert, Dr. Twiggles, who shows them all just how rubber is made and all the wonderful things rubber can make; and it turns out Fish is right.
43b	3b	"Timmy Tippy Toes"	Klipspringers	September 12, 2012	43/203b
Nick and Sally are playing on a climbing frame but just can't manage to get to the top. Cat tries to show them how it's done but he can't do it either. The Cat takes Nick and Sally to see Timmy Tippy Toe, an expert climber and the klipspringer, who teaches them to use their hands and their feet, and now they can reach the top of their own mountain.
44a	4a	"Inside Out"	Mexican jumping beans	September 13, 2012	44/204a
Nick keeps trying to surprise Sally, but he just can't do it. The Cat takes Nick and Sally to the Skippylarito Fields to find a real surprise out there, where the Cat shows them a special Mexican jumping bean that suddenly moves. With a shrunken Thingamajigger, they go inside the bean and meet the moth larvae that lives there. They learn that it's really the moth that causes the bean to move.
44b	4b	"Hear Here"	Animals with excellent ears	September 13, 2012	44/204b
Nick and Sally hear chirping but can't find where it's coming from. If only they had better animal ears like an elephant, owl, and a fox. When the Cat is around, he takes them to meet these animals with amazing ears. Back home the kids used what they learned from their new friends to find the sound – a teeny tiny cricket.
45a	5a	"Meet the Beetles"	Beetles	November 19, 2012	45/205a
Unlike many insects, beetles can't as a rule — take off instantly to the air. So many beetles like a stag beetle, a click beetle, and a bombardier beetle have evolved means for "buying time" when under attack.
45b	5b	"Tongue Tied"	Animals' tongues	November 19, 2012	45/205b
Animals like a giraffe, a mamba, and a chameleon use their tongues in many ways to detect, catch and eat the food they need.
46a	6a	"Manatees and Mermaids"	Manatees	November 20, 2012	46/206a
Nick and Sally discover how Matilda and Marlon, the manatees move slowly, yet gracefully underwater and are at risk as a result from humans in boats.
46b	6b	"The Last Chocolate"	The process of making chocolate	November 20, 2012	46/206b
The Cat takes Nick and Sally to learn about cocoa beans from Princess Lottachoca. The process of how chocolate is made from the humble cocoa bean – by picking the beans, drying them, roasting them and then crushing them to get the juice, then adding sugar while you heat it, pour it into a mold and cool it.
47a	7a	"Tough Enough"	Tardigrades	January 21, 2013	47/207a
Nick and Sally are trying to guess it must be the enormous elephant. The toughest of all is a teeny tiny tardigrade, they off to meet Cat's friend Wally the Waterbear. After shrinking down in the Thingamajigger, they find Wally and start to play the Tough Enough game. Wally is tough enough to live anywhere, so it's off to Freeze Your Knees Snowland to test it out. Then they go to the super hot Gritchity-Gratch Desert, then even a trip into space. Wally can live anywhere and he really is the toughest of all.
47b	7b	"How Cool Is Coral?"	Coral reefs	January 21, 2013	47/207b
The Cat needs help to get his fish friend Ting Tang Tony back to his family, they off to go to Scoobamareen. Tony and Cat got distracted while he was drawing pictures of the beautiful coral that's all around them. Using Cat's drawings as a map, they swim to get Tony back home. Along the way they meet little polyps that live in the coral and learn that they actually helped to make it. They learn about how long it takes to make and how delicate it is. Luckily they soon find Tony's family and they're reunited. Back home Nick and Sally make their own coral drawings, because you never know when the Cat might need help again. The coral gets harmed by a crown-of-thorns starfish, after all, he was actually a palette surgeonfish.
48a	8a	"Rumbly Tumbly"	How stomachs make noises when people are hungry	March 1, 2013	48/208a
However, Nick's hungry tummy is rumbling, they learn our stomachs make noises when they're hungry. A super shrunken trip into Thing One's stomach will be a better look. They learn how chewing and stomach juices help to break down the food, and the tummy sounds are actually the stomach working. When your tummy is empty, the sounds are much louder. There's only one way to quiet Nick's rumbly tumbly: a chewy chocolate chunky chunk chip cookie.
48b	8b	"Planet Name Game"	Planets	March 1, 2013	48/08b
Nick and Sally have run out of things to name in the garden. Good thing Cat needs help putting his model of the Solar System back together – they can help him name the planets. Off in the Space-a-ma-racer they go on a whirlwind trip around the universe, learning the names of the seven planets as they go.
49a	9a	"Top of the Sky"	The sky	March 1, 2013	49/209a
Sally, Nick and Cat are playing with their toy rocket. Using the Cat's Whoa-Look-At-It-Go-Launcher then he shoots the rocket up to the sky. But now they need to go find it. Off to the top of the sky, they pass the treetops and the mountains. He answered "where is the top of the sky?". They meet a treehopper and a yak until they keep going higher until they're in space. They meet Audrey the Astronaut who explains that there is no top to the sky. The sky turns into space and space goes on forever. Just when the kids think their rocket is lost, they find it in Audrey's space station. Although they can't launch their rocket to the top of the sky, launching it to the moon is just as cool.
49b	9b	"Jiggle Bones"	The skeletal system	March 1, 2013	49/209b
Nick and Sally are wiggling and jiggling like the jelly mould in front of them. But they can't quite wiggle the same way, "Bones of course!" announces the Cat. Bones keep their bodies from being wiggly and jiggly. Meanwhile, they visit Dr. Giggles will answer that question. They learn about the big strong bones that help us stand and walk, the small bones that help us bend and move, and the all important bones that help protect our squishy bits. Even though they won't let you wiggle and jiggle like jelly, skeleton bones are important.
50a	10a	"Babies"	How animals carry their babies	April 15, 2013	10/210a
Sally is looking after some baby hamsters, she and Nick hold them right. Therefore, different animals hold their babies in different ways. A trip to Ozzie-Wozz Outback will help them, Cat has some friends who know all about carrying babies. First, they meet Wilma the wolf spider, who carries all her babies on her back. Then it's off to see Dilly the saltwater crocodile, she carries her babies in her mouth. Last stop, they meet Coco the koala who uses a pouch to carry her little one, who helps Nick and Sally. All the babies were happiest with their moms, so they'll just leave them all together.
50b	10b	"Fast!"	Peregrine falcons	April 15, 2013	10/210b
It's a race to the treehouse, but Nick and Sally wish they could go as fast as an airplane. "How about a peregrine falcon?" asks The Cat. His friend Perry the peregrine falcon, the fastest creature in the world, will show them how fast he can be. Off to Steep-and-Deep Cliffs to meet him. Using Cat's special backpacks, the kids have wings like Perry's so they can fly through the air too. Perry shows them how he dives straight down to catch his food. Who wants to be as fast as an airplane, when you can be a peregrine falcon.
51a	11a	"Little Lemmings"	Lemmings	April 16, 2013	51/211a
It's cold outside, but Nick and Sally want to keep playing to stay warm out in the cold. Cat's friend Lars the lemming lives in the Wundra-Bundra-Tundra. It's cold out, but with Lars' fur coat, he doesn't even notice and they help Lars find a new home, one where there's more food for him and his family and they discover that he uses the snow to help keep him warm. Back at home, Nick and Sally wear two winter coats to help them keep warmer than hot chocolate.
51b	11b	"Keep the Beat"	The heart	April 16, 2013	49/209b
Nick and Sally have been running around the backyard and now their chests are thumping along. The Cat explains that this is their hearts booming. A visit to Dr. Giggles, he will answer that question: by shrinking down super small, they follow Dr. Giggles' directions to follow the path that blood takes, learning about how the heart is a pump. They watch Thing 2's heart beat faster when he runs, and slow down when he stops. With all this running around, their bodies are now making another sound: rumbling tummies.
52a	12a	"Gorillas in the Nest"	Gorillas	April 17, 2013	52/212a
Sally and Nick have made a sleepover tent on the floor but it's not very comfortable. The Cat's friend Gordon the gorilla knows how to make a comfortable bed, they off to the Twisty-Misty Mountains to meet him. They discover that gorillas build nests to sleep in, with the dads sleeping on the ground and the moms and kids sleeping in a tree. Now Nick and Sally know how to make their own comfy cozy nests at home.
52b	12b	"The Tale of a Dragon"	Animals that are similar to dragons	April 17, 2013	52/212b
Dragons don't really exist, but Cat knows some lizard friends who are like dragons. They can show Nick and Sally how to pretend to be dragons. The first one they meet is Ignacio the green iguana who shows them his spikes and dewlap. Then it's off to meet Draco the flying lizard who has wings. Kimora the komodo dragon is the last stop, she shows the kids her long wiggly tongue. Now, with some help from things around the house, Nick and Sally know just what they need to be dragons.
53a	13a	"Wrapper's Delight"	Giraffe weevils	July 22, 2013	53/213a
Sally and Nick are trying to wrap a present for their moms. Meeting Cat's good friend Gina the giraffe weevil, will help out. Gina shows them how she uses leaves to wrap her eggs to protect them while she waits for them to hatch. They learn how to carefully roll and fold the leaf so it doesn't rip and it protects the egg. Back at home they can finally finish wrapping their present – a statue of the Cat in the Hat.
53b	13b	"Dive! Swim! Scoop!"	The pelicans	July 22, 2013	53/213b
In Nick and Sally's pool, then both spots a frog, they have to get him out but can't catch him. Cat's good friend Penny the pelican, he can teach them how to catch things in water. Along the way they meet a gannet who shows them how he dives deep into the water to catch his food and a cormorant that zigs and zags through the water to catch hers. But that won't help them catch the frog in their shallow pool. They finally find Penny and watch how she scoops with her big bill, like a net. Now Nick and Sally know how they can rescue the frog in their pool.
54a	14a	"Paper Chase"	The process of making paper; recycling	December 12, 2013	54/214a
Sally and Nick are making paper airplanes, but have run out of paper. Luckily, Cat's friend Dr. Twiggles can help them. Off to the Woody Wood Woods to see him. There, Dr. Twiggles shows them how to make new paper out of old paper – recycling. They watch how the old paper is shredded, then water and cleaner are added to make it into a thick, soupy mess. Then they put it through rollers that flatten it into large sheets of paper. Now Nick and Sally can make their airplanes, the best part is using recycled paper.
54b	14b	"A Polar Adventure"	The polar bears	December 12, 2013	54/214b
Nick and Sally have lost Teddy outside, they need to find him, bears don't like the snow. Well some bears do, proclaims the Cat. In Freeze-Your-Knees-Snowland, Cat's friend Polly the polar bear loves the snow. They meet Polly and her two bear cubs and learn how their thick fur keeps them warm and how their long claws keep them from slipping on the ice. When a storm blows in, Polly keeps everyone warm in her den. Polar bears really do like the cold. Back home, Sally finds Teddy buried under the snow, but he is nice and safe in his own little den.
55a	15a	"Step This Way"	How animals walk on different kinds of feet	March 3, 2014	55/215a
The kids are playing dress up, with Sally wearing her mom's shoes, and Nick wearing his dad's shoes. They're having trouble walking, and the Cat thinks it's because their feet are in the wrong shape. The correct is that everyone has the same shaped feet. The Cat takes them to the Jungle of Bingle-Bungle Boo to meet his friends Emily the common teal, Mikey the lemur and Greg the gecko. They see that animals have differently shaped feet to help them do different things. They need the right feet for the right job.
55b	15b	"Anything You Can Do"	The mimic octopus' ability to imitate other sea creatures	March 3, 2014	55/215b
Nick and Sally are pretending to be The Cat in the Hat. But there's only one Cat, no doubt about that: pretending to be other people is hard. The Cat takes Nick and Sally to meet his good friend Mimi the mimic octopus to learn some tips on how to pretend to be someone else, like a lionfish, a sea snake, a jellyfish, and a zebra sole. They learn how to observe, pick out something special about the person and then copy it. Mimi does it to protect herself, but now Nick and Sally can pretend to be the one and only Cat.
56a	16a	"Name That Sound"	The crickets' ability to chirp	March 3, 2014	56/216a
Sally and Nick are trying to stump each other by guessing the animal sounds they're making. But the Cat stumps them both when he tries to make the sound of a cricket. They all try but just can't figure out how a cricket makes its noise, Cat's friend Clarence the cricket can surely show them. Off to the Grassy-Grove-Dell to meet him. He shows him his wings, one that is comblike, the other a scraper, when he rubs them together, he makes his wonderful cricket noise. Back at home, Nick and Sally find things around the house they can use to mimic Clarence – a deck of cards and a comb.
56b	16b	"Fabulous Feathers"	Peafowl	March 3, 2014	56/216b
Sally is playing dress-up, but her favorite hat no longer has any feathers on it. The Cat's good friend Puranjay might be able to help. He's a peafowl who lives in Feathery Flats, he has plenty of feathers. Sally collects the feathers that have fallen out of Puranjay and discovers that each one has its own distinct job. But it's his tail feathers that are just jazzy and snazzy enough for her hat because they are the most fabulous feathers.
57a	17a	"Balancing Act"	Snow leopards	March 4, 2014	57/217a
Sally and Nick are trying to walk across a beam in their backyard, but are having trouble staying on it. With the help of the Cat, they off to meet his friend Zappa the snow leopard, is an amazing balancer he uses his big wide feet and his long tail to help him keep his balance. Nick and Sally don't have tails, but they see how Zappa moves carefully to keep his weight balanced, now they know to try this at home. Using broomsticks to help them stay balanced, Nick and Sally are able to cross the balance beam. Just in time, Nick and Sally have some yummy bran berry muffins.
57b	17b	"Marvelous Marbles"	The process of making glass	March 4, 2014	58/218b
The kids are playing with glass marbles, until one of them rolls away. It's Nick's "extra luck never miss marble”, Cat will take them to a sandy beach that's full of marbles. When they get there, all they see is sand. Cat's friend Sharky McGee explains that sand makes glass. He shows them how sand is turned into glass and all the wonderful things you can make with it: including marbles.
58a	18a	"Take a Walk"	How animals walk on many legs	March 5, 2014	58/218a
Sally and Nick are practicing to be in a three-legged race, but walking on three legs is hard. If anyone knows about walking, Cat's friends Sid the centipede, Spinny the spider and Bugsy the beetle. They all teach the kids how they walk on many legs by keeping a steady pace and walking in a rhythm and a beat. Back at home, Nick and Sally practice what they learned by using their own special rhythm.
58b	18b	"Cotton Patch"	How cotton is used to make clothes	March 5, 2014	58/218b
However, Nick accidentally tore his shirt, he needs a perfect patch of cotton to fix it. Good thing, Cat's friend Dr. Twiggles knows all about cotton. Off to Fluff'n Stuff Fields to see him, the kids are astonished to learn that you can make clothes from plants. Dr. Twiggles shows them how to pick the cotton, clean and dry it, comb it and spin it into thread. Finally, he demonstrates how the thread comes together to make a patch by using his loom. They even learn how to dye the cotton by using berry juice. Back at home, Nick's new shirt is all better now.
59a	19a	"Biggest Bird"	Ostriches	June 15, 2015	59/219a
Sally and Nick are pretending to be birds, because it's fun to fly. "But not all birds can fly", says the Cat. His friend, Os the ostrich can't fly, but he can do many other things. It doesn't believe they go meet him and try to guess what he's best at doing: they go off to Savannah Saloo. They guess that he's good at being big, a really fast runner, growing beautiful feathers and seeing really far away. They meet Os' wife and ostrich chicks and realize that being moms and dads are what ostriches do best, just like Nick and Sally's moms and dads.
59b	19b	"Drum Di Drum"	The ear	June 15, 2015	59/219b
Nick and Sally are trying to make some music, but they need drums. "What about the drums in your ears?" asks the Cat, while Dr. Giggles will teach them all about it. By shrinking down super small, they go inside Thing One's ear to explore. They get to the eardrum and learn that it's not for making sounds, but for catching them. Back at home, they play their music, and thank their ear drums for being able to hear it.
60a	20a	"The Skin I'm In"	Skin	June 23, 2015	59/220a
Nick and Sally are playing super heroes when Nick cuts his finger. He wishes he had skin like a super hero. "Oh but you do", says The Cat. They visit Dr. Giggles to learn all about how super skin is, is just the thing. By shrinking down really small, they discover teeny tiny hairs on our skin, how stretchy our skin is and slippery too. They even learn that old skin falls off and new skin grows. It even fixes itself when it's hurt, skin really is super.
60b	20b	"Fishy Washy"	The cleaner fish	June 23, 2015	59/220b
Sally and Nick need to clean up the backyard. Cat has a friend who's an expert at cleaning, perhaps he can give them some tips. It's off to the ocean to meet this cleaner fish. They discover that Rufus doesn't clean the ocean, he cleans other fish, like the barracuda. They watch as Rufus cleans one bit at a time, it's the trick. Suddenly, Sally and Nick need to watch out for that sea turtle. They realize that it's not so hard to clean up, especially when you have friends to help. Note: This is the second season finale.

=== Season 3 (2018) ===
No. overall	No. in season	Title	Lesson(s)	Original release date	Prod. code
61a	1a	"Whatever Floats Your Boat"	Sinking and floating	March 2, 2018	61/301a
When Nick and Sally's boat sinks, they need to build another boat, but don't know how. A trip to Floating Island helps them discover that along with needing the right material, you also need to make the shape of your boat float.
61b	1b	"Building Bridges"	Bridges	March 2, 2018	61/301b
Nick is in pursuit of finding out how to build a drawbridge. In Spansylvania, he and Sally meet a dragon who's in pursuit of them – and along the way they find out that some materials are better suited for bridges than others.
62a	2a	"Accidents Happen... If You're Lucky"	Accident lessons	March 5, 2018	62/302a
When Sally destroys Nick's model of a mountain, the Cat takes them to meet Sara of Serendip, an inventor who helps them understand that you can make new discoveries through your mistakes that involves mixing colors and making a volcano.
62b	2b	"Making Waves"	Hearing sound travel in waves	March 5, 2018	62/302b
Nick discovers that Sally can't hear him when he yells from his bedroom window if their bedroom windows are closed. The Cat takes them to the Soundy Sea and they learn that sound travels in waves.
63a	3a	"Pulling Together"	Pulley	March 6, 2018	63/303a
The kids want to get a trunk up into the treehouse and go to the Machine-a-Ma-Zoo where they're introduced to some simple machines, but learn about the pulley.
63b	3b	"Fact and Friction"	Friction	March 6, 2018	63/303b
Sally loses her slidiness and when she and Nick go to the Frictionarium, they find out that there's a force called friction that can stop a person from sliding.
64a	4a	"Shadow Play"	Shadows	March 7, 2018	64/304a
Nick and Sally are having a sleepover in the treehouse and Nick is startled by a shadow. The Cat explains that shadows aren't scary if you know what they are. He takes them to Shadowland where they learn about how the position of the light can make shadows grow or shrink.
64b	4b	"Play Ball"	Ball	March 7, 2018	64/304b
Nick unintentionally loses Sally's bouncy ball, they go to Ballaballo and learn how different balls are made of different materials that make them bouncier.
65a	5a	"The Search for String"	Strings	March 8, 2018	65/305a
Nick and Sally need a strong piece of string to pull their train, but it breaks, and they don't have anything stronger in their craft box. The Cat takes them away, but the Thingmajigger malfunctions and they have to make an unscheduled landing. It turns out they've shrunken and are inside the craft box, where they discover that they can create a stronger string by braiding several strands together.
65b	5b	"Mirror Mirror"	Reflections	March 8, 2018	65/305b
Nick and Sally are in the treehouse making funny faces at themselves in the mirror when they notice a bird flying back and forth into the tree branches. They discover that the bird is building a nest and they want to get a closer look but can't do it without disturbing the birds. The Cat takes them to a mirror world where they learn how reflections work and they concoct a kind of periscope that allows them to watch the bird without disturbing it.
66a	6a	"Opposites Attract"	Magnetics	March 13, 2018	66/306a
Nick gets some new train cars for his train set and wants to add them to his train, but the magnets won't connect. The Cat takes him and Sally to a magical magnets world where they learn how poles attract or repel.
66b	6b	"The Talents of Balance"	Balance	March 13, 2018	66/306b
Nick is trying to learn how to ride his bike and in Balencia, he discovers the things to keep in mind when you are trying to maintain your balance.
67a	7a	"Who Can See the Wind?"	Wind	March 14, 2018	67/307a
Sally wants to fly her kite but can't seem to work out the timing to get the wind right – you can't see the wind. The Cat takes Sally and Nick to Windnasium where they learn to see wind in all kinds of ways.
67b	7b	"Gravity Drop"	Gravity	March 14, 2018	67/307b
When Nick's favorite flyer gets stuck in the tree, he wishes he could jump really high and retrieve it, but gravity holds him down. The Cat takes him and Sally to Gravity Drop where they discover what happens when there is more or less gravity. Nick figures out how to use gravity to get his plane back.
68a	8a	"Nick's Cricket"	Crickets	March 15, 2018	68/308a
Nick wants to create a new home for the cricket in his and Sally's backyard, but the cricket won't go in. The Cat takes them on a journey but has to make an emergency landing on Lagoona-Maroon where they discover what they really need when it comes to making a shelter.
68b	8b	"Go With the Flow"	Water levels	March 15, 2018	68/308b
Nick and Sally are frustrated by a puddle that always forms at an inconvenient spot on the sidewalk. They go to a water park and learn that water always seeks the lowest level.
69a	9a	"Design Time"	Designing	June 4, 2018	69/309a
Sally is trying to make a vase for her mother but each one she tries falls over. The Cat takes her and Nick to Blueprintia and they discover what they can learn by designing before building.
69b	9b	"A Prize Surprise"	Magnets	June 4, 2018	69/309b
The kids are creating a game that involves "fishing" for prizes, but they can't "catch" any of the prizes. The Cat takes them to an arcade where they discover what will (and won't) be attracted to a magnet.
70a	10a	"Clever Levers"	Levers	June 5, 2018	70/310a
The kids need to move a big rock in their backyard so they can plant an apple tree. The Cat takes them to Machine-a-Ma-Zoo where they learn about levers.
70b	10b	"Going, Going Gong"	Volume	June 5, 2018	70/310b
Sally is playing a song on an instrument made up of different things in the Treehouse but she can't find the right note for her song. In Gongolia, she and Nick find out that bigger things make lower sounds and smaller things make higher sounds.
71a	11a	"You're It"	Senses	June 6, 2018	71/311a
Sally keeps getting found by Nick when they play Hide and Seek. The Cat takes them to Tagaloo to meet a great seeker. They keep trying to catch up to the elusive Tagaloop, and along the way they find out that they can use more than their sense of sight to find things.
71b	11b	"Holes"	Filtering	June 6, 2018	71/311b
Sally loses her special bead in the sandbox and they can't find it. The Cat takes her and Nick to the Hole-Lot-of Funhouse, where they have to make their way across different floors without falling through. Along the way they discover how filtering works.
72a	12a	"Bump Bump Bump Around"	Magic tricks	September 16, 2018	72/312a
When Nick's magic trick causes his toy car to disappear under the porch, the Cat takes him and Sally to Arcade Island to win a Gasper-ma-clasper. But instead they find out the magic of bumping things around.
72b	12b	"Snow Difference"	Snowman	September 16, 2018	72/312b
The kids want to make a great snowman but the clothes they have chosen are frozen in the ice and snow. The Cat takes them to Coldsnap Island where they discover that when they warm up ice or snow it becomes water.
73a	13a	"All Sorts of Things"	Sorting	September 22, 2018	73/313a
Nick and Sally can't agree on the "right" way to sort their toys. The Cat takes them to Toborrowland to help him return a bunch of things. As they confront different obstacles, they have to come up with different ways of sorting Cat's things, and they realize there are lots of ways to sort.
73b	13b	"Bubble Trouble"	Bubbles	September 22, 2018	73/313b
Nick and Sally try to save a bubble for Sally's mom, but they always pop. In Odds-n-Endsville they find out that landing bubbles on some surfaces helps the bubbles last longer.
74a	14a	"Cause and Effect"	Cause and effect	September 23, 2018	74/314a
When Nick's water glass suddenly falls over without anyone touching it, Cat comes to help them solve the mystery. They go to The Great Causeway and discover the world of cause and effect.
74b	14b	"Good Vibrations"	Sounds, vibration	September 23, 2018	74/314b
Nick and Sally are playing musical instruments and notice that Fish's water is rippling. Cat takes them to the Jingly Jungle for a concert by the great Vibrato. They discover that sound and vibration go together.
75a	15a	"The Smart Move"	Move	September 29, 2018	75/315a
Nick and Sally's soccer game is obstructed by a large log that they can't lift out of the way. In Machine-a-ma-zoo, they discover that there is a much easier way to move that log than by lifting it.
75b	15b	"Simply Simple"	Simple	September 29, 2018	75/315b
Nick's new plane is flying well but is a little dull so the kids add buttons and glitter but then they don't understand why the plane isn't flying as well as it did. In Odds n' Endsville, they discover that there can be too much of a good thing, and sometimes keeping it simple is the best solution.
76a	16a	"Enough Is Enough"	Enough	September 30, 2018	76/316a
Sally thinks that the three sticks she has are not enough to make anything. The Cat takes her and Nick to a place where they can get more sticks. Along the way, they discover just how many things you can do with three sticks.
76b	16b	"Back on Track"	Train set	September 30, 2018	76/316b
When Nick drops the mail bag into his train set, his fingers are too big get it out. The Cat shrinkamadoodles him and Sally so they are small enough to be in the train set. But when the Thingamajigger falls out of reach, they need the right sized tool to help them out.
77a	17a	"Mind Changing Fun"	Optical illusions	October 6, 2018	77/317a
Sally is convinced that a tall thin glass of juice holds more than a short wide glass so Cat takes them to Point O'View where they learn that getting evidence can cause them to change their mind.
77b	17b	"Curious Minds"	Hypotheses	October 6, 2018	77/317b
Nick and Sally wonder if they can walk on a cloud, and the Cat takes them to Mount Knowmore. As they climb up, they discover hard surfaces and watery surfaces and walk through fog. And when they get to the top, they know more about walking on clouds.
78a	18a	"The Treehouse Handshake"	Handshake	October 7, 2018	78/318a
Sally invents a secret treehouse handshake, but Nick can't remember the sequence. Cat takes them to Over-and-Overton, where they figure out how to get through a series of obstacles by recognizing patterns.
78b	18b	"The Big Pictures"	Big pictures	October 7, 2018	78/318b
When Nick and Sally don't understand why one toy car goes faster than another, the Cat needs their help to move some big pictures. Along the way, they find out about how to make things more aerodynamic.
79a	19a	"Batteries Not Included"	Battery	October 13, 2018	79/319a
Nick and Sally are disappointed when their toy's battery runs out of power. The Cat takes them to Lots-o-Lakes Land to see the flight of the Dipsydoodlers. Along the way, the Thingamajigger runs out of Go-Go-Go juice and they have to find other ways to make it go.
79b	19b	"Checking the Boxes"	Boxes	October 13, 2018	79/319b
Sally and Nick have wrapped Father's Day gifts, but when they get mixed up the kids can't tell which is which. Cat takes them to Zippy Zaroo's Cookie Factory where each cookie has a toy inside. When the shrunken Thingamajigger ends up inside a cookie, they have to figure out which cookie it is in.
80a	20a	"The Hard Weigh"	Weight, balance	October 14, 2018	80/320b
Sally wants to make a perfect mobile with four identical rubber ducks, but she has only three ducks. The Cat takes her and Nick to The Bazaar at Balancia Point, where everything is in balance and has to remain so. Sally finds out there is more than one way to balance things.
80b	20b	"The Song Flower Solution"	Gardening	October 14, 2018	80/320a
Nick and Sally are trying to build a sandcastle but the sand is either too dry or too wet. The Cat takes them to see the Song Flower Sisters, who need just the right mixture of water and soil before they will sing. Note: This is the series finale.

=== Specials (2012–16) ===
No.	Title	Lesson(s)	Original release date
1	"The Cat in the Hat Knows a Lot About Christmas!"	The amazing abilities of caribou, elephants, dolphins, and crabs; keeping promises	November 21, 2012
The Cat in the Hat, Sally, and Nick help the lost reindeer to return to Freeze Your Knees Snowland on time. There they meet an elephant, a dolphin, and a crab, but they found a stuck gerbil inside the Thing-a-ma-jigger.
2	"Dr. Seuss' Birthday Cat-ebration!"	Cricket, feathers, measurement	March 3, 2014
Sally and Nick both understand about different-shaped feet, pretend to be the Cat in the Hat, make cricket chirps, and search for feathers.
3	"The Cat in the Hat Knows a Lot About Camping!"	Nature	July 25, 2016
The Cat in the Hat takes Nick and Sally on a summer adventure fun-filled with camping, hiking, and paddling on their way to Fish's family reunion. The Cat's cousins, the Little Cats A, B and C, also join in the fun.
4	"The Cat in the Hat Knows a Lot About Halloween!"	Halloween, Courage	October 28, 2016
The Cat in the Hat takes Nick and Sally on the craziest Halloween adventure, where they go to the Oooky-ma-kooky Closet to help find Nick and Sally the best Halloween costumes ever.
5	"The Cat in the Hat Knows a Lot About Space!"	Space, Exploring	December 26, 2016
The Cat in the Hat takes Nick and Sally on a space adventure to assist with Operation Rover Repair.
