= List of Doki episodes =

Doki (also known as Doki Adventures) is a Canadian animated television series produced by Portfolio Entertainment for Discovery Kids. The series debuted on Discovery Kids in Latin America on April 15, 2013. Doki was renewed for two more seasons.

== Series overview ==
Season	Episodes	Originally released	
Season	Episodes	First released	Last released
Pilot	2	December 23, 2009	
1	26	April 15, 2013	September 17, 2014
Specials	5	January 1, 2015	July 23, 2017
2	26	May 18, 2015	April 22, 2016
3	24	March 4, 2017	June 18, 2019

== Episodes ==
=== Pilot (2009) ===
Title	Directed by	Written by	Storyboard by	Original release date
"Tomb Readers"	Neil Affleck	John Derevlany	Greg Hill	December 23, 2009
Doki and his friends visit Egypt to learn more about hieroglyphs.
"Fico on Ice"	Neil Affleck	John Derevlany	Jean-Sebastian Duclos	December 23, 2009
Fico visits to the South Pole to visit his aunt Ericka.

=== Season 1 (2013–14) ===
No. overall	No. in season	Title	Directed by	Written by	Storyboards by	Original release date	U.S. air date
1	1	"Brave Knight Fico" "On the Silk Road"	Brandon Lloyd	Peter Sauder Karen Moonah	Matt Roach and Drew Edwards	April 15, 2013	September 1, 2014 (Qubo)
"Brave Knight Fico": Fico wants to become a dragon-battling knight, and gets his chance on Komodo Island. "On the Silk Road": Anabella rips her mom's silk scarf by accident, giving the team a chance to learn about the origins of silk.
2	2	"Doki in Orbit" "A Big Stretch"	Brandon Lloyd	Kenn Scott Bob Ardiel	Kevin Currie and Helder Mendonca	April 16, 2013	September 1, 2014 (Qubo)
"Doki in Orbit": The gang goes to visit the International Space Station, and Doki learns the hard way the 0-g is no help with juggling. "A Big Stretch": Fico takes the team on a rubber hunt in the Amazon rainforest, but the resulting giant ball he makes causes mayhem.
3	3	"Climb Every Mountain" "Fico's Hot Bath"	Brandon Lloyd	Patrick Granleese John Slama	Venz Vesselinov and Drew Edwards	April 17, 2013	September 2, 2014 (Qubo)
"Climb Every Mountain": The gang goes on an expedition to Mount Everest, where Doki learns that even pros have problems climbing the world's tallest mountain. "Fico's Hot Bath": When Fico needs a bath, it leads the gang on an expedition to Iceland to search for ways to bath outdoors. Songs sang in this episode: "I Love Mud!", sung by Fico.
4	4	"The World's Favorite Flavour" "Down by the Bay"	Brandon Lloyd	Peter Sauder Betty Quan	Kevin Currie and Matt Roach	April 18, 2013	September 2, 2014 (Qubo)
"The World's Favorite Flavor": Oto runs out of liquid vanilla for the gang's ice cream, prompting an expedition to Madagascar. "Down by the Bay": Gabi's flower outgrows its pot, leading the gang to search for a new one in the Bay of Fundy. Songs sang in this episode: "We're Stranded", sung by Oto.
5	5	"Ups and Downs" "Doki in the Deep"	Brandon Lloyd	Kenn Scott Betty Quan	Matt Roach and Venz Vesselinov	April 19, 2013	September 3, 2014 (Qubo)
"Ups and Downs": The gang goes on an expedition to the Albuquerque International Balloon Fiesta to learn the secrets of floating balloons. Songs sang in this episode: "Hot Air Balloon Song", sung by Zeke, Fico, Doki, Gabi and Anabella. "Doki in the Deep": An expedition to the Mediterranean Sea reveals a whole underwater world of glowing sea creatures.
6	6	"Doki's Pipe Dream" "Squeezin' Cheese"	Brandon Lloyd	Karen Moonah Bridget Newson	Ron Huse and Drew Edwards	April 19, 2013	September 8, 2014 (Qubo)
"Doki's Pipe Dream": The gang goes on an expedition to Spain to learn how to build an aqueduct. "Squeezin' Cheese": An expedition to Switzerland teaches the gang in the art of making cheese.
7	7	"Team Doki's Bike Challenge" "Doki's Desert Discovery"	Brandon Lloyd	Patrick Granleese Bridget Newson	Kevin Currie and Matt Roach	April 25, 2013	September 8, 2014 (Qubo)
"Team Doki's Bike Challenge": Team Doki have a bike race in France to see whose bike is best when Oto has to choose a new one. "Doki's Desert Discovery": Doki and his friends visit the ancient city of Petra in the Jordan Desert to find ways to build Oto his own personal pantry.
8	8	"The Sky's the Limit" "The Nutcracker? Sweet!"	Brandon Lloyd	Betty Quan Kenn Scott	Venz Vesselinov and Drew Edwards	April 30, 2013	September 9, 2014 (Qubo)
"The Sky's the Limit": Team Doki comes to New York City on Christmas to find out how skyscrapers are built, using what they've learned to make a tall and stable Christmas cake. Songs sang in this episode: "Cake of Wonder, Cake of Height (to the tune of We Three Kings of Orient Are)", "Joy Song" and "The 12 Days of Christmas", all sung by Fico. "The Nutcracker? Sweet!": The gang pays a visit to Moscow, Russia, where a friend of Anabella's invites them to see a play for the Nutcracker Suite.
9	9	"The Big Picture" "Up on the Roof"	Brandon Lloyd	Patrick Granleese Kenn Scott	Kevin Currie and Ron Huse	June 14, 2013	September 9, 2014 (Qubo)
"The Big Picture": When Anabella's new painting is almost ruined in a water balloon fight, Team Doki heads to Lascaux for a place that will protect her art. "Up on the Roof": When Gabi's garden is destroyed by rabbits, the Team heads off to New York City to find a solution for her problem.
10	10	"Play with Clay" "Chasing Rainbows"	Brandon Lloyd	Shelia Dinsmore Kenn Scott	Matt Roach and Venz Vesselinov	June 21, 2013	September 10, 2014 (Qubo)
"Play with Clay": Fico's new mug breaks, so Team Doki heads off to Patzcuaro to learn about pottery. Songs sang in this episode: "Piñata Song", sung by the Mexican Musician Trio, Fico and Oto, and reprised by Doki, Mundi, Fico, Gabi and Anabella. "Chasing Rainbows": The gang have a question about rainbows, so they travel to Victoria Falls, Zimbabwe to find answers. Songs sang in this episode: "Left, Over, Right, Center", sung by Doki, Fico and Gabi.
11	11	"Monster Masquerade" "Castles and Monsters"	Brandon Lloyd	Betty Quan John Slama	Venz Vesselinov and Drew Edwards	June 28, 2013	September 10, 2014 (Qubo)
"Monster Masquerade": The gang pays a visit to a studio in Hollywood to learn how to make realistic Halloween costumes. "Castles and Monsters": While Fico and Gabi engage in a prank war, the rest of the gang explores a castle near Loch Ness, Scotland.
12	12	"Going for the Gold" "Water Woes"	Brandon Lloyd	Kenn Scott Anita Kapila	Kevin Currie and Matt Roach	September 1, 2013	September 11, 2014 (Qubo)
"Going for the Gold": The gang heads to Yukon to search for gold. "Water Woes": When the team's sandcastle contest is ruined, they all head off on an expedition to the Sahara Desert, Africa.
13	13	"Happy Noodle Year!" "Happy New Year... Again!"	Brandon Lloyd	Bob Ardiel Patrick Granleese	Drew Edwards and Venz Vesselinov	December 24, 2013	September 11, 2014 (Qubo)
"Happy Noodle Year!": When the team receives a call from Dan-Dan, they all go to Beijing, China, to celebrate Chinese New Year and learn about Chinese New Year traditions. Songs sang in this episode: "Shake That Dough", sung by Oto and Anabella. "Happy New Year... Again!": The gang learns about how time is invented and ring in the New Year in London.
14	14	"Mysterious Moai" "Hide and Seek"	Brandon Lloyd	Betty Quan Sheila Dinsmore	Kevin Currie and Ron Huse	December 31, 2013	September 12, 2014 (Qubo)
15	15	"Doki's Canal Race" "Fico's Masterpiece"	Brandon Lloyd	Bridget Newson Betty Quan	Kevin Currie and Ron Huse	January 7, 2014	September 12, 2014 (Qubo)
16	16	"Aloha Birthday" "Catch a Falling Star"	Brandon Lloyd	Anita Kapila Kenn Scott	Drew Edwards and Ron Huse	March 23, 2014	September 15, 2014 (Qubo)
17	17	"Treetop Team" "A Whale of a Tale"	Brandon Lloyd	Bob Ardiel Kenn Scott	Kevin Currie and Paul Rodrigue	March 23, 2014	September 15, 2014 (Qubo)
18	18	"Team Tenderfoot" "Doki's Egg Experiment"	Brandon Lloyd	Sheila Dinsmore Patrick Granleese	Drew Edwards and Ron Huse	March 30, 2014	September 16, 2014 (Qubo)
19	19	"Deep Freeze Doki" "Pentathlon Pranks"	Brandon Lloyd	Bridget Newson Patrick Granleese	Kevin Currie and Venz Vesselinov	April 3, 2014	September 16, 2014 (Qubo)
20	20	"Crabby Crossover" "City of Kites"	Brandon Lloyd	Sheila Dinsmore Kenn Scott	Drew Edwards and Ron Huse	April 3, 2014	September 17, 2014 (Qubo)
21	21	"Robot Rampage" "Fixed in a Flash"	Brandon Lloyd	Kenn Scott Anita Kapila	Kevin Currie and Venz Vesselinov	April 10, 2014	September 17, 2014 (Qubo)
22	22	"North to Dokiland" "Runway Runaround"	Brandon Lloyd	John Slama Bridget Newson	Drew Edwards and Ron Huse	April 17, 2014	September 18, 2014 (Qubo)
23	23	"The Treasure Hunters" "Subway Solution"	Brandon Lloyd	Patrick Granleese Bridget Newson	Kevin Currie and Venz Vesselinov	September 18, 2014	September 18, 2014 (Qubo)
24	24	"Traders of 'Taters" "Doki's Bright Idea"	Brandon Lloyd	Bob Ardiel Kenn Scott	Leisl Adams and Craig Taillefer	September 19, 2014	September 19, 2014 (Qubo)
25	25	"Doki and the Dholki" "Totora Trouble"	Brandon Lloyd	Betty Quan Karen Moonah	Ron Huse and Venz Vesselinov	September 19, 2014	September 19, 2014 (Qubo)
26	26	"Stuck on Carnival" "Fico's Fossil"	Brandon Lloyd	Anita Kapila Bob Ardiel	Leisl Adams and Kevin Currie	September 22, 2014	September 22, 2014 (Qubo)

=== Specials (2015–17) ===
No.	Title	Directed by	Written by	Storyboards by	Original release date
1	"Team Doki: From Past to Presents"	Brandon Lloyd	Kenn Scott	Matt Roach and Jordan Voth	January 1, 2015
Team Doki returns home to celebrate their first year together with a big party, but a storm makes them land in a mangrove swamp. To pass the time they take turns telling the story of the team's first expedition. Songs sang in this episode: "We're Friends Through and Through!", sung by Team Doki.
2	"Doki Rocks Rio"	Brandon Lloyd	Patrick Granleese	Ron Huse and Jordan Voth	February 13, 2015
Team Doki wants to have the best musical group in the Rio de Janeiro music festival, but when its instruments are destroyed, it undertakes a musical adventure to replace them! Doki learns that he does not need a special instrument to have fun with his friends, and that having fun is more important than being the best. Songs sang in this episode: "We're Gonna Rock Around the World", sung by Team Doki, "Samba Song", sung by a Musician Kid, "Capoeira Song" sung by the Capoeira Dancers, Oto and Anabella, "Oh Yeah!", sung by Doki, and "Mariana's Song", sung by Mariana.
3	"Doki on the High Seas"	Brandon Lloyd	Story by : Patrick Granlesse and John Slama; Teleplay by : John Slama	Ron Huse and Venz Vesselinov	April 22, 2015
When a Caribbean cruise takes an unexpected turn, Team Doki has the opportunity to do something he always wanted play pirates on a real boat! Songs sang in this episode: "The Pirate Song", sung by Team Doki and Captain Snagglebeard.
4	"Team Doki's Extreme Adventure"	Gary Hurst	Kenn Scott	TBA	July 23, 2017
Fico is very happy because the team is going to have an extreme adventure. The team goes on an extreme adventure on Mount Kilimanjaro, Tanzania, to show off their extreme skills!
5	"The Write Stuff"	Gary Hurst	Patrick Granleese	TBA	July 23, 2017
When the team attends the presentation of a book in the library the author encourages Doki to dare to write. He is excited; can you really write your own book?

=== Season 2 (2015–16) ===
No. overall	No. in season	Title	Directed by	Written by	Storyboards by	Original release date	U.S. air date
27	1	"The Great Wall of Fico" "Doki by the Dozen"	Brandon Lloyd	Karen Moonah Patrick Granleese	Leisl Adams and Jordan Voth	May 18, 2015	April 6, 2016 (Ion Television); May 31, 2016 (Qubo)
28	2	"Bubble Wrap" "Doki's Double Trouble"	Brandon Lloyd	Betty Quan Kenn Scott	Kevin Currie and Venz Vesselinov	May 19, 2015	April 6, 2016 (Ion Television); May 31, 2016 (Qubo)
29	3	"Shake a Tail Feather" "Mundi's Day Off"	Brandon Lloyd	Pete Sauder Anita Kapila	Leisl Adams and Alex Greychuck	May 20, 2015	April 7, 2016 (Qubo)
30	4	"Crystal Caves" "Abraca-Doki"	Brandon Lloyd	Betty Quan Kenn Scott	Jordan Voth and Kevin Currie	May 21, 2015	April 7, 2016 (Qubo)
31	5	"A Knight to Remember" "Big Money"	Brandon Lloyd	Patrick Granleese John Slama	Venz Vesselinov and Leisl Adams	May 22, 2015	April 8, 2016 (Qubo)
32	6	"A Twister Tale" "Stinky Shoes"	Brandon Lloyd	Barry Craigmyle Lienne Sawatsky and Dan Williams	Alex Greychuck and Jordan Voth	May 25, 2015	April 8, 2016 (Qubo)
33	7	"Oto-nardo Da Vinci" "Ghost Hunting"	Brandon Lloyd	Karen Moonah Anita Kapila	Kevin Currie and Venz Vesselinov	May 26, 2015	April 11, 2016 (Qubo)
34	8	"To Catch a Fish" "Mosaic Madness"	Brandon Lloyd	Pete Sauder Patrick Granleese	Leisl Adams and Alex Greychuck	May 27, 2015	April 11, 2016 (Qubo)
35	9	"Giants of Japan" "The Flying Fish"	Brandon Lloyd	Betty Quan Anita Kapila	Jordan Voth and Kevin Currie	August 14, 2015	April 12, 2016 (Qubo)
36	10	"The Trouble with Truffles" "Luck of the Irish"	Brandon Lloyd	Kenn Scott Betty Quan	Venz Vesselinov and Drew Edwards	August 17, 2015	April 12, 2016 (Qubo)
37	11	"The Amazing Maze" "Doki's Dolphin"	Brandon Lloyd	Kenn Scott John Slama	Alex Greychuck and Jordan Voth	August 18, 2015	April 13, 2016 (Ion Television); June 7, 2016 (Qubo)
38	12	"Party Like It's 1859" "Team Doki's Big Squeeze"	Brandon Lloyd	Patrick Granleese Sheila Dinsmore	Kevin Currie and Venz Vesselinov	August 19, 2015	April 13, 2016 (Ion Television); June 7, 2016 (Qubo)
39	13	"Okefenokee Doki" "Testing Team Doki"	Brandon Lloyd	John Slama Lienne Sawatsky and Dan Williams	Kevin Currie and Venz Vesselinov	August 20, 2015	April 14, 2016 (Qubo)
40	14	"Oto Flips" "Doki Goes Batty"	Brandon Lloyd	Patrick Granleese Kenn Scott	Jordan Voth and Kevin Currie	August 21, 2015	April 14, 2016 (Qubo)
41	15	"Stuck on Style" "The High Life"	Brandon Lloyd	Karen Moonah Barry Craigmyle	Venz Vesselinov and Drew Edwards	December 1, 2015	April 15, 2016 (Qubo)
42	16	"Game On" "Mars or Bust"	Brandon Lloyd	Betty Quan Jeff Sweeney	Alex Greychuck and Jordan Voth	December 2, 2015	April 15, 2016 (Qubo)
43	17	"Going, Going, Gone!" "The Rare Bird"	Brandon Lloyd	Betty Quan John Slama	Drew Edwards and Kevin Currie	December 3, 2015	April 18, 2016 (Qubo)
44	18	"Secrets and Spies" "Butterfly City"	Brandon Lloyd	Patrick Granleese Bob Ardiel	Alex Greychuck and Venz Vesselinov	December 4, 2015	April 18, 2016 (Qubo)
45	19	"My Fair Fico" "Chasing Unicorns"	Brandon Lloyd	Jeff Sweeney Story by : Pete Sauder; Teleplay by : Kenn Scott	Drew Edwards and Kevin Currie	December 7, 2015	April 19, 2016 (Qubo)
46	20	"S'no Trouble" "Art of the Steal"	Brandon Lloyd	Barry Craigmyle Kenn Scott	Alex Grevchuck and Venz Vesselinov	February 29, 2016	April 19, 2016 (Qubo)
47	21	"Smart House" "Little Dutch Doki"	Brandon Lloyd	Patrick Granleese Jeff Sweeney	Drew Edwards and Kevin Currie	March 1, 2016	April 20, 2016 (Ion Television); June 14, 2016 (Qubo)
48	22	"Think Pink" "Doki and Ducki"	Brandon Lloyd	Betty Quan Karen Moonah	Alex Grevchuck and Venz Vesselinov	April 25, 2016	April 20, 2016 (Ion Television); June 14, 2016 (Qubo)
49	23	"Fico's Floaties" "Doki Digs to China"	Brandon Lloyd	John Slama Karen Moonah	Drew Edwards and Kevin Currie	April 26, 2016	April 21, 2016 (Qubo)
50	24	"Skateboard Showdown" "Lion Problem"	Brandon Lloyd	Kenn Scott Betty Quan	Drew Edwards and Kevin Currie	April 27, 2016	April 21, 2016 (Qubo)
51	25	"No Foolin' Fico" "Big Top Doki"	Brandon Lloyd	Jeff Sweeney and James Backshall Patrick Granleese	Venz Vesselinov and Alex Greychuck	April 28, 2016	April 22, 2016 (Qubo)
52	26	"Team Doki's Big Adventure" "Fire Team Doki"	Brandon Lloyd	Anita Kapila Kenn Scott	Drew Edwards and Ron Huse	April 29, 2016	April 22, 2016 (Qubo)

=== Season 3 (2017–19) ===
No. overall	No. in season	Title	Directed by	Written by	Storyboards by	Original release date	U.S. air date
53	1	"All's Fair at the Fair" "Doki in the Mist"	Gary Hurst	Karen Moonah Jeff Sweeney and James Backshall	TBA	March 4, 2017	TBA
54	2	"Gabi of the Opera" "Message in a Bottle"	Gary Hurst	Stephen Senders Brian Hartigan	TBA	March 4, 2017	TBA
55	3	"Be the Seed" "The Float Vote"	Gary Hurst	Betty Quan Katherine Sandford	TBA	March 10, 2017 March 11, 2017	TBA
56	4	"Vanishing Beach" "Doki Never Forgets"	Gary Hurst	Kenn Scott Jeff Sweeney and James Backshall	TBA	March 11, 2017	TBA
57	5	"Undersea Wonders" "Doki of Sherwood"	Gary Hurst	John Slama Brian Hartigan	TBA	March 16, 2017 March 17, 2017	TBA
58	6	"Counting Penguins" "Fico's Fault"	Gary Hurst	Betty Quan Berry Craigmyle	TBA	July 17, 2017 July 18, 2017	TBA
59	7	"The Friendly Match" "Detective Doki"	Gary Hurst	Patrick Granleese Betty Quan	TBA	July 20, 2017 July 21, 2017	TBA
60	8	"Return of the Worms" "Down the Drain"	Gary Hurst	Betty Quan James Backshall & Jeff Sweeney	TBA	July 21, 2017 July 24, 2017	TBA
61	9	"Moving House" "Castaways"	Gary Hurst	Kenn Scott James Backshall	TBA	July 25, 2017 July 23, 2017	TBA
62	10	"Eggcelent Expedition" "Step Right Up!"	Gary Hurst	James Backshall Stephan Senders	TBA	July 25, 2017	TBA
63	11	"The Copycats" "Hot Stuff"	Gary Hurst	Stephan Senders	TBA	July 29, 2017 July 30, 2017	TBA
64	12	"The Mysterious Skunk Ape" "Doki Delivers"	Gary Hurst	Jeff Sweeney Stephen Senders	TBA	September 4, 2017	TBA
65	13	"Help for Kelp" "Scrappy Adventure"	Gary Hurst	James Backshall Stephen Senders	TBA	September 7, 2017	TBA
66	14	"Quest for Lost City" "Camp Blackfly"	Gary Hurst	Stephen Senders Brian Hartigan	TBA	September 11, 2017	TBA
67	15	"Surf's Up!" "The Bushwhack Way"	Gary Hurst	James Backshall & Jeff Sweeney Karen Moonah	TBA	September 14, 2017	TBA
68	16	"Buenas Splotches" "Tall Tales"	Gary Hurst	Karen Moonah Jeff Sweeney	TBA	September 18, 2017	TBA
69	17	"Doki Goes Raven Mad" "Itza Expedition Time!"	Gary Hurst	Brian Hartigan Karen Moonah	TBA	September 21, 2017	TBA
70	18	"Spoiler Alert" "Help for Hippos"	Gary Hurst	Karen Moonah James Backshall & Jeff Sweeney	TBA	September 25, 2017	TBA
71	19	"On the Lamb" "Weather or Not"	Gary Hurst	Steve Westren Patrick Granleese	TBA	September 5, 2018	TBA
72	20	"Doki Makes a Connection" "Stuck in Space"	Gary Hurst	Brain Hartigan	TBA	September 8, 2018	TBA
73	21	"Doki Meets the Mangler" "Doki's Mousetrap"	Gary Hurst	John Slama Brian Hartigan	TBA	September 21, 2018	TBA
74	22	"Best Foot Forward" "Golf Ball Bandit"	Gary Hurst	Brian Hartigan Jeff Sweeney	TBA	January 28, 2019	TBA
75	23	"Too Close to Comfort" "Prehistoric Puzzle"	Gary Hurst	Karen Moonah James Backshall and Jeff Sweeney	TBA	February 4, 2019	TBA
76	24	"Charming Fico" "Doki's Roaring Adventure"	Gary Hurst	Steve Westren Patrick Granleese	TBA	June 18, 2019	TBA
