= Doki (TV series) =

- Also known as: Doki Adventures
- Genre: Adventure; Comedy
- Based on: The mascots of Discovery Kids Latin America
- Developed by: JBMW Media
- Directed by: Brandon Lloyd (season 1-2); Gary Hurst (season 3)
- Voices of: Griffin Hook; William Romain; Tara Emo; Caden Hughes; Collin Dean; Lukas Engel; Katie Grant; Sarah Sheppard; Lucas Kalechstein; Roman Lutterotti
- Composer: Eggplant Productions
- Countries of origin: Canada; Latin America
- Original languages: English; Spanish
- No. of seasons: 3
- No. of episodes: 76 (and 5 specials) (list of episodes)

Production
- Executive producers: Lisa Olfman; Joy Rosen
- Producer: Julie Stall
- Running time: 22 minutes
- Production companies: Discovery Communications; Nelvana (pilot only); Portfolio Entertainment (full series); PiP Animation Services (seasons 1–2); Portfolio Animation (season 3)

Original release
- Network: Discovery Kids (Latin America); TVOKids (Canada); Qubo/Discovery Familia (United States)
- Release: April 15, 2013 – June 18, 2019

Doki (also known as Doki Adventures) is an animated children's television series that aired on Discovery Kids in Latin America from April 15, 2013, to June 18, 2019. The show was co-produced by Portfolio Entertainment and Discovery Communications.

The series follows a six-year-old dog named Doki and his five friends; Mundi, Oto, Anabella, Gabi, and Fico, who are members of the Worldwide Expedition Club and a group of explorers collectively known as "Team Doki". On May 12, 2016, the series was renewed for a third season that premiered on March 4, 2017. The show's fourth season was initially scheduled to premiere in 2020. However, the season was cancelled.

== Characters ==
=== Main ===
- Doki (voiced by Griffin Hook in season 1–early season 3 and William Romain in late season 3) is an 6-year-old dalmatian dog, whose love of adventure makes very crazy situations absolutely no problem for him. Doki is always open to suggestions and tips from his friends. He learns from his mistakes a lot and applies his knowledge to his adventures.
- Mundi (voiced by Tara Emo) is a ladybug-fairy hybrid girl, who is also an expert mechanic. She is always willing to help out others when needed. When the team goes on expeditions, she pinpoints the destination on the map and says “(Name of place), here we come!”
- Oto (voiced by Caden Hughes in seasons 1–2, Collin Dean in early season 3 and Lukas Engel in late season 3) is an anteater, and the captain, conductor, or driver of any vehicle or transport method that the group of explorers use in their adventures. His confidence doesn't always fit with their skills and perfect landings. Oto loves to change clothes, costumes or hats and almost always travels with his friend Mundi. Mundi can fix what he breaks.
- Anabella (voiced by Katie Grant) is a hot pink flamingo, and the innocent, playful and loving little sister of the group. Always very happy, she tends to daydream a lot and can easily get distracted by anything beautiful or unusual. She is deeply sensitive, and she often expresses how she feels by dancing. Anabella is very cute and has a free spirit, and is open and very adventurous.
- Gabi (voiced by Sarah Sheppard) is a bright, energetic, and precocious goat who is the most grown-up of the group and often uses complex words that the team doesn't always understand. She has a great sense of humour and is very brave, loyal, stubborn when necessary, and very competitive. Despite her obvious maturity, Gabi hides a weakness; a tendency to believe that she is the smartest of the group, appearing insensitive to the feelings of others and her great heart, the salvation of all complicated situations. She has a pet worm named Lancelot.
- Fico (voiced by Lucas Kalechstein in season 1–early season 3 and Roman Lutterotti in late season 3) is a blue otter, and the silly one of the group who is cheerful and known for being quite funny, affectionate, and impulsive. He's like a whirlwind, impetuous and energetic, to the point of almost being hyperactive. However, he sometimes gets a bit confused and easily distracted, and this situation usually leads to awkward and difficult situations that he struggles to face. He loves risky activities, water sports, and speed.

== Episodes ==
Season	Episodes	Originally released	
Season	Episodes	First released	Last released
Pilot	2	December 23, 2009	
1	26	April 15, 2013	September 17, 2014
Specials	5	January 1, 2015	July 23, 2017
2	26	May 18, 2015	April 22, 2016
3	24	March 4, 2017	June 18, 2019

== History and production ==
Since 2005 to 2016 (until his return on Discovery Kids's 30th anniversary in 2026), Doki served as the channel's mascot for bumpers, praised for teaching children values about sharing, active play, empathy, taking care of the environment, etc., attending also to Teletón in 2011. In 2012, due to the character's popularity, JBMW Media began developing Doki as a full series, with Portfolio Entertainment producing and distributing the series on April 15, 2013. For seasons 1 and 2, PiP Animation Services produced animation. Starting with season 3, Portfolio Animation took over animation production.

== Reception ==
Emily Ashby from Common Sense Media rated Doki a four out of five stars, stating that "Together the friends set off on far-flung expeditions to see the world and learn all about it, from seeing how gravity works (or doesn't work) in space to wondering whether there's such a thing as a modern dragon. In each case, they travel in a vehicle of Oto's making (typically a plane, though sometimes a rocket or other craft) to explore distant places and learn about their people, animals, cultures, and natural significance". She also stated that "In addition to exploring lots of aspects of the natural sciences, Doki also exposes kids to a variety of new places and cultures in simple but meaningful ways. A trip to China for some silk thread to mend a scarf becomes a lesson on how silkworms work, but it also touches on the sounds, the food, and the art forms of the place on a level that's easy for kids to grasp. And for those who want to enhance the experience, the stories plant the seed for further learning as a family."

== Broadcast ==
Doki premiered on Discovery Familia in the United States on November 11, 2013. The English version later premiered on Qubo on September 1, 2014, until it ceased on February 28, 2021, and ION Television's Qubo Kids Corner programming block on January 4, 2015. The episode "Doki Rocks Rio" aired on Discovery Family on August 5, 2016 and August 7, 2016, respectively.

In Asia, the series premiered on Discovery Kids Asia on February 15, 2016, and on Discovery Family in Africa on April 1, 2016. In Canada, the show airs on Knowledge Network, TVOKids and Toon-A-Vision. In Australia, the show aired on Discovery Kids. In Iran, the show aired on IRIB TV2. In the United Arab Emirates the show debuted on Nat Geo Kids Abu Dhabi on November 20, 2017.
