= The Cat in the Hat Knows a Lot About That! =

Children's television series (2010–2018)

- Genre: Children's television Musical; Educational; Comedy; Adventure
- Based on: The Cat in the Hat by Dr. Seuss
- Directed by: Tony Collingwood
- Voices of: Martin Short; Jacob Ewaniuk; Deandray Hamilton; Alexa Torrington; Halle Nunes; Robert Tinkler
- Theme music composer: David Schweitzer
- Opening theme: "The Cat in the Hat Knows a Lot About That!" sung by the cast
- Ending theme: "The Cat in the Hat Knows a Lot About That!" (instrumental)
- Composers: David Schweitzer (score) various (songs)
- Countries of origin: Canada; United Kingdom; United States
- Original language: English
- No. of seasons: 3
- No. of episodes: 80 (160 segments) (list of episodes)

Production
- Executive producers: Lisa Olfman; Joy Rosen; Tony Collingwood
- Producers: Julie Stall; Helen Stroud
- Running time: 30 minutes
- Production companies: Dr. Seuss Enterprises; Collingwood O'Hare Productions (seasons 1–2); Portfolio Entertainment; Random House Children's Entertainment; KQED (seasons 1–2); Treehouse TV (seasons 1–2); Corus Entertainment (season 3)

Original release
- Network: Treehouse TV (Canada); Kids' CBC (Canada); CITV (United Kingdom); PBS Kids (United States)
- Release: September 6, 2010 – October 14, 2018

Related
- The Wubbulous World of Dr. Seuss; Gerald McBoing-Boing; Green Eggs and Ham; Go, Dog. Go!

The Cat in the Hat Knows a Lot About That! is an animated musical educational children's television series starring Martin Short as The Cat in the Hat. The series premiered on Treehouse TV in Canada on August 7, 2010, also airing on YTV and Nickelodeon Canada on weekday mornings from 2012 to 2013, and on PBS Kids and PBS Kids Preschool Block in the US on September 6, 2010; it also aired on CITV and Tiny Pop in the UK, and Disney Junior India. The series is based on Random House's Beginner Books franchise and The Cat in the Hat's Learning Library, itself based on the 1957 children's book The Cat in the Hat.

The series was produced by Portfolio Entertainment, Random House Children Entertainment, and Collingwood O'Hare Productions, in conjunction with KQED, PBS, Treehouse TV, and Kids' CBC. The first season has 40 half-hour episodes and ended on September 17, 2012.

In early 2012, the series was renewed a second season of 20 episodes, which premiered on September 10, 2012. After the second season finale, the series stayed on a hiatus until it started a third and final season containing 20 episodes. The third season premiered on March 2, 2018.

In September 2018, the series was canceled after three seasons before the finale aired on October 14, 2018. 80 episodes (160 segments) were produced.

== Premise ==
In the show, The Cat in the Hat leads neighbors Nick, Sally (and sometimes the Fish and Thing One and Thing Two) on a variety of adventures in his "Thinga-ma-jigger", a Seussian contraption that can sprout wings to fly, pontoons, booster rockets, change size and do just about anything else necessary to further the adventure. Each episode is prompted by a question posed by either Nick or Sally at the beginning of each episode (along with the "Travelling Song" — a rock-'n'-roll song, with The Cat in the Hat saying a varied quote from Dr. Seuss that ends with a vowel —), that in turn inevitably leads them around the world to make natural science discoveries.

Like other programs on PBS Kids (such as Curious George and Sid the Science Kid), the show focuses on promoting science literacy for preschoolers.

== Episodes ==
Season	Episodes	Originally released	
Season	Episodes	First released	Last released
1	40	September 6, 2010	September 17, 2012
2	20	September 10, 2012	June 23, 2015
3	20	March 2, 2018	October 14, 2018
Specials	5	November 21, 2012	December 26, 2016

== Characters ==
=== Main ===
- The Cat in the Hat (voiced by Martin Short) is a knowledgeable, adventurous, anthropomorphic cat. He loves to discover the world and act as Nick and Sally's guide, and he frequently speaks in rhyming patterns reminiscent of the Dr. Seuss character on which he is based. He is much wiser and less of a trickster in this incarnation.
- Nicholas "Nick" Brown (voiced by Jacob Ewaniuk in seasons 1 & 2 and Deandray Hamilton in season 3) is a Jamaican-American boy and Sally's next-door neighbor and best friend. He replaces Sally's brother Conrad (who is also the unnamed narrator in the original book).
- Sally Walden (voiced by Alexa Torrington in seasons 1 & 2 and Halle Nunes in season 3) is a blonde-haired girl and Nick's next-door neighbor and best friend.
- Fish (voiced by Robert Tinkler) is a moderately pessimistic fish who is based on the fish in the original story and whose color is changed to red. However, in the first 2 seasons, he appears to belong to the Cat instead of Sally or Nick as depicted in this incarnation, until season 3, when he lives back with Sally or Nick; he is also much more cooperative, and sometimes joins the Cat's adventures.
  - Tinkler also voices Thing One and Thing Two, a pair of blue-haired humanoids in red suits who are the Cat's helpers. They speak their own language and sometimes join the Cat's adventures.

=== Supporting ===
- Mrs. Brown (voiced by Tracey Hoyt), Nick's mother who appears in some episodes and, whenever Nick asks permission to go on an adventure with the Cat, the answering voice is heard; she speaks with a Caribbean accent.
  - Hoyt also voices Joan Walden, Sally's mother who appears in some episodes and, whenever Sally asks permission to go on an adventure with the Cat, the answering voice is heard.

== Home media ==
NCircle Entertainment released DVDs from October 25, 2010 to June 27, 2016: each being in region 1, subtitled in English and Spanish; approximately 60 minutes (with a few exceptions); in Dolby Digital, in 5.1 surround and Dolby surround stereo in Spanish. Also, each has the bonus segments from the show.

- Wings and Things
  - Show Me the Honey
  - Migration Vacation
  - I Love the Nightlife
  - Oh Give Me a Home
  - Many Ants Make Light Work
- Up and Away
  - A Plan for Sand
  - Whale Music
  - Flower Power
  - Dress Up Day
  - Bath Time
- Tales About Tails
  - Sticky Situation
  - Trees Company
  - Rain Game
  - You Should Be Dancing
  - A Tale About Tails
- Told from the Cold
  - Snowman's Land
  - Flight of the Penguin
  - A Long Winter's Nap
  - Reindeer Games
- Surprise, Little Guys
  - Super Secret Digger
  - Night Lights
  - Along Came a Spider
  - Teeny Weeny Adventure
  - Hold On Tight
- Trick and Treats
  - Batty for Bats
  - Aye Aye
  - Trick or Treat
- Breeze from the Trees
  - Nest Best Thing
  - The Lost Egg
  - The Tree Doctor
- Miles and Miles of Reptiles
  - Now You See Me
  - Be Cool
  - Itty Bitty Water
- Ocean Commotion!
  - Reef Magic
  - Digging the Deep
  - King Cecil the Seahorse
  - Ice Is Nice
  - Help with Kelp
- Safari, So Good!
  - Treetop Tom
  - Stripy Safari
  - The King of Swing
  - Elephant Walk
  - Follow the Prints
- Let's Go on an Adventure
  - Maps
  - Incredible Journey
  - I See Seeds
  - Sniff and Seek
  - Go Snails Go
- Space is the Place
  - Jumping on the Moon
  - No Night Today
  - Planet Name Game
  - Top of the Sky
  - Tough Enough
- The Cat in the Hat Knows a Lot About Halloween!

== Awards ==
- 2012 Parents' Choice Award – Winner in Television
- 2012 Cynopsis: Kids !magination Awards – Winner, TV Series based on books
- 2012 Cynopsis: Kids !magination Awards – Winner, Song for a TV Series
- 2012 Kidscreen Awards – Recognized, Best Integrated Promotion
- 2012 Teachers' Choice Awards – For the Classroom: "Wings and Things" (DVD NCircle Entertainment)
- 2012 Young Artist Awards – Nominated, Best Performance in a Voice-Over, TV or Feature Film Young Actor
- 2012 Parents' Choice Award – Best Website
- 2012 Kidscreen Awards – Finalist, Best Companion Website
- 2012 Cynopsis: Kids !magination Awards – Honorable Mention, Website for a TV Series or TV Special
- 2012 Webby Awards – Website, Official Honoree
- 2011 – Nomination, Outstanding Performer in an Animated Program (Martin Short)
- 2011 Daytime Emmy Awards – Nomination, Outstanding Original Song in Children's & Animation
- 2011 NAPPA Awards – "Told from the Cold" (DVD NCircle Entertainment)
- 2011 WGC Screenwriting Awards – Winner, Animation
- 2011 Young Artist Awards – Nominated, Best Performance in a Voice-Over, TV or Feature Film Young Actor
- 2011 Young Artist Awards – Nominated, Best Performance in a Voice-Over, TV or Feature Film Young Actress
- 2011 Youth Media Alliance – Nomination, Award of Excellence, Animation Three to Five Years
- 2010 Parents' Choice Awards – Recommended Seal
