= Portfolio Entertainment =

Canadian television production and distribution company

Portfolio Entertainment, Inc.
- Logo used since 2018
- Type: Subsidiary
- Industry: Entertainment
- Founded: 1991; 35 years ago
- Founder: Lisa Olfman; Joy Rosen
- Defunct: 2024; 2 years ago
- Fate: Assets acquired by 9 Story Media Group
- Successor: 9 Story Media Group
- Headquarters: 901 King Street West, Suite 301, Toronto, Ontario M5V 3H5, Canada
- Divisions: Portfolio Animation
- Website: portfolioentertainment.com

Portfolio Entertainment, Inc. was a Canadian television production and distribution company. It was founded in 1991 by Lisa Olfman and Joy Rosen with a focus on children's programming, later expanding into primetime and movie production. The company distributed television programming internationally to more than 90 countries, with about four-fifths of its catalogue being in-house productions.

On February 5, 2024, 9 Story purchased the assets of Portfolio Entertainment. Portfolio CEO Lisa Olfman became an executive producer at 9 Story, where she will report to Vince Commisso (CEO and president of 9 Story).

== Productions ==
=== Television shows and films ===
Title	Years	Notes
Groundling Marsh	1994–1997	YTV, Disney Channel, PTV, J.A. Delmage Productions, Lyrick Studios and Groundling Marsh Productions
Adventures with Kanga Roddy	1998	International distributor
Toad Patrol	1999–2002	International distributor
The Living Century	2000–2003	PBS
Animal Miracles	2001–2003	International distributor
RoboRoach	2001–2004	Helix Animation
Cyberchase	2002–2017	International distributor; produced by Thirteen New York, Nelvana, Flying Minds Entertainment, PiP Animation Services and Title Entertainment
Igloo Gloo	2002–2006	Zone-3
Bump!	2004–2013	International distributor
Carl²	2005–2011	PiP Animation Services
Heads Up!	2005–2008	International distributor
The Cat in the Hat Knows a Lot About That!	2010–2018	Collingwood & Co., Random House Children's Entertainment, Dr. Seuss Enterprises, KQED, Treehouse TV, Kids' CBC and PBS Kids
You Gotta Eat Here!	2012–2017	International distributor
Doki	2013–2019	Discovery Kids
Freaktown	2016	PiP Animation Services
Bravest Warriors	2017–2018	Animation production; season 4 only
Hero Elementary	2020–2022	Twin Cities PBS and PBS Kids
Doomsday Brothers	2020–2021	Niveau 12 Media, Tubi, Corus Entertainment
Breaking Bear	2026–present	Co-production with Evoke Entertainment, To The Stars, 9 Story Media Group and Tubi; uncredited
