= PiP Animation Services =

Canadian animation studio

PiP Animation Services Inc.
- Type: Private
- Industry: Animated television shows Animated films
- Founded: March 18, 1998; 28 years ago
- Founders: Dulcie Clark; Eleanor Noble
- Headquarters: Ottawa, Canada
- Number of employees: 45
- Website: www.pipanimation.com/w6/

PiP Animation Services Inc. is a Canadian full-service animation studio based in Ottawa, Ontario. Its most notable work includes the PBS Kids series Cyberchase, Caillou and The Cat in the Hat Knows a Lot About That!. A Puffin serves as their mascot.

== Animation accomplishments ==
Somewhere between 2000 and 2002, PiP did some work on the animated series Anne of Green Gables, in conjunction with Sullivan Entertainment's animation studio. PiP was specifically responsible for the digital backgrounds of certain episodes.

PiP did work on a couple of shows for the Amberwood Productions studio. The first was the Katie and Orbie television program. They were responsible for the background colors and the unit background designs for the show. The studio also did work on their show Hoze Houndz.

For Nelvana Limited, PiP did work on the television series Maggie and the Ferocious Beast, which was broadcast on Nickelodeon and Teletoon.

It also contributed to the series The Ripping Friends, which was a series from animator John Kricfalusi of Ren & Stimpy fame. The studio also did some animation work for Ren & Stimpy "Adult Party Cartoon" as well.

In 2004, the company performed digital editing for a three-commercial spot marketing campaign for the popular job-searching site, Monster.com.

In 2006, a series that PiP had contributed to, Caillou, won an award for Best Animated Production in a TV Series, from the Canadian Awards for the Electronic and Animated Arts (CAEAA).

The studio was a co-producer of the 2021 film Lamya's Poem.

== Animation techniques ==
PiP uses Adobe Photoshop, Painter and Illustrator for background work, but overall it uses the program Adobe Flash for its 2D animation.

== Contributions to the animation/film industry ==
In 1999, PiP partnered with imX communications Inc., and Funbag Animation Studios Inc. to announce two new animation production companies: Helix Animation Inc. in Halifax, Nova Scotia and Helix Digital Inc. in Sydney, Nova Scotia. Helix Animation began working in July 1999, and Helix Digital officially opened its doors for business in June 2000.

In 2008, PiP hosted a party at the Ottawa International Animation Festival.
