= Hiroko Yoda =

Japanese translator and writer

- Born: Tokyo, Japan
- Education: University of Maryland
- Occupations: Writer, Translator

Hiroko Yoda is a Japanese entrepreneur, translator, writer, folklorist, and president of the localization company AltJapan Co., Ltd. She was also a Tokyo city editor for the CNN travel website CNNGo. She is a translator of video games and the author of numerous books about Japanese history and culture. She is particularly known for her pioneering work contextualizing yokai culture for English-speaking audiences. She is the author of the bestselling book "Eight Million Ways to Happiness: Wisdom For Inspiration and Healing From the Heart of Japan", published by Penguin Random House in the US and Bloomsbury in the UK and Australia.

== Education ==
Born in Tokyo, she studied at the University of Maryland, then earned a Master's degree in International Peace and Conflict Resolution from American University in Washington, D.C.

== Personal life ==
In 2005, she played the role of a yokai frog in the Takashi Miike film The Great Yokai War. She also had a cameo in the 2010 Tomoo Haraguchi film Death Kappa.

In 2008, she was denied a Facebook account. She was told that "Facebook blocks the registration of a number of names that are frequently abused on the site. The name Yoda, also being the name of a popular Star Wars character, is on this list of blocked names." The company only relented after her plight gained international mass media attention alongside other cases of banned names.

She is married to the writer and television personality Matt Alt.

== Works ==
=== Games ===
As scriptwriter

- World of Demons
- Ninja Gaiden Sigma 2
- Ninja Gaiden Dragon Sword

As translator

- Silhouette Mirage
- Lunar: Silver Star Story
- Dragon Quest VIII
- Ninja Gaiden II
- The Wonderful 101
- Nioh

As localization producer

- Dynasty Warriors Gundam
- Lost Planet 3
- Strider (2014)

=== Books ===
- Hello Please! Very Helpful Super Kawaii Characters From Japan. Chronicle. 2006. ISBN 978-0811856744.
- Yokai Attack! The Japanese Monster Survival Guide. Kodansha International. 2008. ISBN 978-4770030702.
- Ninja Attack! True Tales of Samurai, Assassins, and Outlaws. Kodansha International. 2010. ISBN 9784770031198.
- Yurei Attack! The Japanese Ghost Survival Guide. Tuttle Publishing. 2011. ISBN 9784805312148.
- Eight Million Ways to Happiness. Penguin Publishing Group. 2025. ISBN 9780593474433.

=== Translations ===
Books

- Japandemonium Illustrated: The Yokai Encyclopedias of Toriyama Sekien. Dover Publications. 2016. ISBN 9780486800356.
- An Introduction to Yokai Culture. Japan Library. 2017. ASIN B071HTQRMT.

Manga

- The Young Magician. CMX. 2005. ISBN 1401207375.
- Nura: Rise of the Yokai Clan. Viz Media. 2011. ISBN 9781421538914.
- Doraemon. Shogakukan. 2014. ASIN B00GTG4776.
- Dorohedoro. Viz Media. 2010–2019. ISBN 9781421533636.
