= Pure Invention =

2020 book by Matt Alt

Pure Invention: How Japan Made the Modern World, or Pure Invention: How Japan's Pop Culture Conquered the World, is a 2020 non-fiction book by Matt Alt. It was published in the United States by Crown Publishing, and in the United Kingdom by Constable.

Alt, from the U.S. state of Maryland, worked as a translator for the United States Patent and Trademark Office before co-founding the localization company AltJapan Co., Ltd. He is married to the translator and author Hiroko Yoda.

The book explored the impact of Japanese popular culture on those of other countries. Alt's book focuses on five products: toy cars, anime, karaoke, "kawaii" products, and the Sony Walkman. The book documents how Matsuzo Kosuge, in the post-World War II era, established a business selling tin toy cars, notably American Jeeps from the occupation of Japan. It then expands into other inventions such as Hello Kitty, Nintendo game consoles, Pokémon, Gundam, and the anonymous websites 2channel and 4chan to portray how Japanese pop culture became the "lingua franca of the Internet." It argues that Japan fascinates the West because Western societies have come to resemble Japan in many ways.

Kirkus Reviews describes the book as "nerd- and generalist-friendly" as well as "savvy".
