= List of Dorohedoro chapters =

Cover of the first tankōbon volume, published by Shogakukan on January 30, 2002

Dorohedoro is a Japanese manga series written and illustrated by Q Hayashida. The series began in the first ever issue of Shogakukan's seinen manga magazine Spirits Zōkan Ikki (re-branded as Monthly Ikki in 2003), released on November 30, 2000. Monthly Ikki ceased publication on September 25, 2014, and the series was transferred to Monthly Ikki's magazine replacement Hibana, starting on March 6, 2015. Hibana ceased publication after a two-year run on August 7, 2017, and Dorohedoro was transferred to Shogakukan's shōnen manga magazine Monthly Shōnen Sunday on November 10 of the same year. The manga finished after eighteen years of publication on September 12, 2018, with its 167th chapter. Shogakukan collected the chapters in 23 tankōbon volumes, released from January 30, 2002, to November 12, 2018. A 14-page special chapter was published 17 months after the series' finale in Monthly Shōnen Sunday on February 12, 2020.

In North America, Viz Media began distributing the manga digitally in 2009 when it launched its SigIKKI site, the former online English version of Monthly Ikki. The twenty-three volumes of Dorohedoro were released in print from March 16, 2010, to September 17, 2019. It was translated by the localization company AltJapan.

== Volumes ==
- Note: All chapters are labeled as "Spells".

No.	Original release date	Original ISBN	English release date	English ISBN
1	January 30, 2002	978-4-09-188271-4	March 16, 2010	978-1-4215-3363-6
1. "Caiman" (カイマン, Kaiman); 2. "Hungry Bug" (ハングリーバグ, Hangurī Bagu); 3. "The Nightmare Man" (悪夢の中のアイツ, Akumu no Naka no Aitsu); 4. "In the Bag" (袋の中, Fukuro no Naka); 5. "Silence at the Table" (食事中はお静かに, Shokuji-chū wa Oshizuka ni); 6. "My Neighbor the Sorcerer" (隣の町の魔法使い, Tonari no Machi no Mahōtsukai); "Extra Evil 1"
2	September 30, 2002	978-4-09-188272-1	August 17, 2010	978-1-4215-3376-6
7. "The Night of the Living Dead" (死者の夜, Shisha no Yoru); 8. "Bloody Battle in the Central Department Store Square!" (血闘!!中央デパート前, Chitō!! Chūō Depāto Mae); 9. "Dances with Lizards" (トカゲも踊る盛り沢山, Tokage mo Odoru Moridakusan); 10. "Roast Duck a la Sorcerer" (鴨のロースト魔法使い添え, Kamo no Rōsuto Mahōtsukai Soe); 11. "The Sorcerers' World Tournament" (統一魔界なんちてトーナメント, Tōitsu Makaina n Chite Tōnamento); "Extra Evil 2"
3	June 30, 2003	978-4-09-188273-8	January 18, 2011	978-1-4215-3377-3
12. "Formal Attire Requested" (舞踏会へは正装でおこし下さいませ, Budōkai e wa Seisō de Okoshi Kudasaimase); 13. "Another Year Another Hole" (ゆく年くる年 in"ホール", Yuku Toshi Kuru Toshi in "Hōru"); 14. "Caiman in Wonderland" (魔法の国のカイマン, Mahō no Kuni no Kaiman); 15. "The Secret of the Fire-Flushing Toilet" (炎洗式トイレ秘話, Honō Arai-shiki Toire Hiwa); 16. "The Girl Who Sells Smoke" (ケムリ売りの少女, Kemuri Uri no Shōjo); 17. "The Mushrooms Are Ready" (キノコの山は食べ盛り, Kinoko no Yama wa Tabezakari); "Extra Evil 3"
4	January 30, 2004	978-4-09-188274-5	August 16, 2011	978-1-4215-3378-0
18. "The First Smoke" (はじめてのケムリ, Hajimete no Kemuri); 19. "Manhole Elegy" (マンホール哀歌, Manhōru Erejī); 20. "The All Star ☆ Dream Game" (オールスター☆夢の球宴, Ōru Sutā ☆ Yume no Kyūen); 21. "The All Star ☆ Dream Game Heats Up!" (オールスター☆夢の球宴白熱!!, Ōru Sutā ☆ Yume no Kyūen Hakunetsu!!); 22. "Fatty Lizard" (トカゲ増量中！, Tokage Zōryō-chū !); 23. "Good Day to Leave" (いい日、旅立ち。, Ī Hi, Tabidachi); "Extra Evil 4"
5	August 30, 2004	978-4-09-188275-2	December 20, 2011	978-1-4215-3379-7
24. "Mr. Monster, La-la-la" (ラララ怪人くん, Rarara Kaijin-kun); 25. "Gorgeous and Gorging" (ゴージャス＆モリモリ, Gōjasu Ando Mori Mori); 26. "Blue Night Land" (ブルーナイト・ランド, Burū Naito Rando); 27. "Oh, "Flowersmoke"" (嗚呼、『花煙』, Aa, "Hana Kemuri"); 28. "The Wonderful Meat Pie" (すてきなミートパイ, Sutekina Mīto Pai); 29. "The Strange Mushroom Appears!!" (珍キノコ出現!!, Chin Kinoko Shutsugen!!); 30. "Welcome, Mr. Mushroom ♥" (キノコちゃん、いらっしゃ～い ♥, Kinoko-chan, Irasshai); "Extra Evil 5"
6	February 28, 2005	978-4-09-188276-9	April 17, 2012	978-1-4215-3380-3
31. "Lonely Caiman" (ロンリー・カイマン, Ronrī Kaiman); 32. "Phantom of the Night" (真夜中の怪人, Mayonaka no Kaijin); 33. "The Nightmare Before" (ナイトメア・ビフォー, Naitomea Bifō); 34. "Manju of Terror" (まんじゅうコワイ, Manjū Kowai); 35. "Sweet Potato Rendezvous" (ヤキイモ・ランデブー, Yakīmo Randebū); 36. "The Boss" (ザ・ボス, Za Bosu); "Extra Evil 6"
7	October 28, 2005	978-4-09-188277-6	August 21, 2012	978-1-4215-3381-0
37. "See You at the Food Stall" (屋台で逢いましょう, Yatai de Aimashou); 38. "Nice Pies, Baby" (お、パイぽろぽろ, O, Pai Poro Poro); 39. "Boy Meets Girl… And Fights!" (ボーイ ミーツ ガール＝バトル！); 40. "Lets Recycle ♥" (資源を大切に ♥, Shigen o Taisetsu ni); 41. "Dinner With a Special Someone" (夕食は、いい人と, Yūshoku wa, Ī Hito to); 42. "Smoky Drive!" (モクモク・ドライブ！, Moku Moku Doraibu!); 43. "Horror! Bloody Mansion Murder Dance" (恐怖！血みどろ館 惨殺の輪舞, Kyōfu! Chimidoro-kan Zansatsu no Rinbu); "Extra Evil 7"
8	May 30, 2006	978-4-09-188278-3	December 18, 2012	978-1-4215-3382-7
44. "Couples Virute" (夫婦善哉, Fūfuzenzai); 45. "Cross-Eye Doll" (十字目ドール, Jūji-me Dōru); 46. "Mastema Underground" (マステマ・サブナード, Masutema Sabunādo); 47. "Cross-Eye Tragedy" (十字目哀史, Jūji-me Aishi); 48. "Sweet Home" (スイートホーム, Suīto Hōmu); 49. "Shining ☆ Youth" (キラリ☆青春, Kirari ☆ Seishun); "Extra Evil 8"
9	January 30, 2007	978-4-09-188279-0	April 16, 2013	978-1-4215-3383-4
50. "Memory-Go-Round" (めぐるめぐるよ記憶がめぐる, Meguru Meguru yo Kioku ga Meguru......); 51. "Come Back to the Hole" (カムバック ホール, Kamubakku Hōru); 52. "A Goldbug is a Rich Bug" (コガネムシは金持ちだ♪, Koganemushi wa Kanemochida ♪); 53. "Cute Meat Market ♥" (かわいいお肉屋さん ❤, Kawaī Onikuyasan); 54. "Door to the Past" (過去への扉, Kako e no Tobira); 55. "Final Night: For Two" (最後の夜・2人, Saigo no Yoru Futari); "Extra Evil 9"
10	July 30, 2007	978-4-09-188280-6	August 13, 2013	978-1-4215-3384-1
56. "Meetin' in the Rain" (めぐり逢い・雨, Meguri Ai Ame); 57. "Journey with a Friend" (旅は道連れ, Tabi wa Michidzure); 58. "Small Change Love ❤" (小銭LOVE❤, Kozeni Rabu); 59. "Return of the Mushrooms!" (キノコ復活！, Kinoko Fukkatsu!); 60. "Farewell, My Caiman" (さよならカイマン, Sayonara Kaiman); 61. "Magic and Carpets" (魔法とジュータン, Mahō to Jūtan); "Extra Evil 10"
11	February 29, 2008	978-4-09-188283-7	December 17, 2013	978-1-4215-3385-8
62. "Burning Heart ❤" (ハート炎上❤, Hāto Enjō); 63. "Memory Bubble" (記憶の泡, Kioku no Awa); 64. "My Secret Plan" (胸先三寸・腹ひとつ, Munasakisanzun Hara Hitotsu); 65. "Cross-Eye Expedition" (十字君遠征, Dokuga en expédition; Jūji-kun Ensei); 66. "Deformed Reunion" (異形ノ再会, Igyō no Saikai); 67. "Skill of the Moment" (刹那スキル, Setsuna Sukiru); "Extra Evil 11"
12	September 30, 2008	978-4-09-188284-4	April 15, 2014	978-1-4215-3386-5
68. "Shock and Anarchy" (混乱ショップ, Konran Shokku); 69. "The Wandering Chase" (彷徨いチェイス, Samayoi Cheisu); 70. "Black Box" (ブラックボックス, Burakku Bokkusu); 71. "Room 501" (501号室, 501-gōshitsu); 72. "Mosh Pit" (モッシュ・ピット, Mosshu Pitto); 73. "Embossing" (エンボス加工, Enbosu Kakō); "Extra Evil 12"
13	May 29, 2009	978-4-09-188285-1	August 19, 2014	978-1-4215-6535-4
74. "Cross-Eyes in the News" (十字のニュース, Jūji no Nyūsu); 75. "Idea-drome" (イデア・ドローム, Idea Dorōmu); 76. "Lucky ★ Jerk" (ラッキー☆ジャーク, Rakkī ★ Jāku); 77. "Advanced Magic" (序ウキュウ魔法, Jōkyū Mahō); 78. "Ballad of the Happy Destruction" (破チアワセのバラッド, Yabuchiawase no Baraddo); 79. "Question & Answer" (急＆A, Kyū ando A); "Extra Evil 13"
14	January 29, 2010	978-4-09-188286-8	December 16, 2014	978-1-4215-6536-1
80. "Eye Contact" (アイコンタクト, Ai Kontakuto); 81. "Demon's Dinner Table" (Demonの食卓, Dēmon no Shokutaku); 82. "Headbangers' Journey" (ヘッドバンガーズ・ジャーニー, Heddobangāzu Jānī); 83. "Ground Zero" (グラウンド・ゼロ, Guraundo Zero); 84. "Killing Field" (キリングフィールド, Kiringu Fīrudo); 85. "Morphing" (モーフィン, Mōfin); "Extra Evil 14"
15	November 30, 2010	978-4-09-188287-5	May 19, 2015	978-1-4215-6537-8
86. "Placekicker" (プレースキッカー, Purēsukikkā); 87. "Messy Skull" (グチャノコウベ, Gucha no Kōbe); 88. "Strange Love" (ストレンジラヴ, Sutorenji Ravu); 89. "Day Zero" (0日前, Zero-nichi Mae); 90. "Eyewitness" (アイウィットネス, Aiwitonesu); 91. "Evil Makeover" (魔改造, Ma Kaizō); 92. "Whole in One" (ホールインワン, Hōru In Wan); 93. "Remaining Bullets" (残弾, Zandan); "Extra Evil 15"
16	October 28, 2011	978-4-09-188288-2	August 18, 2015	978-1-4215-7795-1
94. "Cross Replay" (クロスリプレイ, Kurosu Ripurei); 95. "Conceptual Quarrel" (観念的競合, Kannenteki Kyōgō); 96. "Free Hospital" (無賃貸病棟, Mu Chintai Byōtō); 97. "Fujita's Excellent Adventure" (ヘナチョコふじたの大冒険, Henachoko Fujita no Dai Bōken); 98. "Morphing" (変態, Hentai); 99. "Playing with Parts" (遊胴尋問, Yūdō Jinmon); 100. "Half-Clear" (反透明, Han Tōmei); 101. "Colorless Hero" (英雄無色, Eiyū Mushoku); "Extra Evil 16"
17	September 28, 2012	978-4-09-188605-7	December 15, 2015	978-1-4215-7796-8
102. "Venture Junction" (思惑ジャンクション, Omowaku Jankushon); 103. "Bug Harassment" (虫虫ハラスメント, Mushi Mushi Harasumento); 104. "Silent Reunion" (再会サイレント, Saikai Sairento); 105. "Food Court Full-Course Meal" (デパ地下フルコース, Depa Chika Furu Kōsu); 106. "Quagmire" (ドロ沼, Doro Numa); 107. "Sludge Sacrifice" (ヘドロの生贄, Hedoro no Ikenie); 108. "Mirage Landmark" (蜃気楼ランドマーク, Shinkirō Randomāku); 109. "Seriously Close" (間近マジカ, Madjika Majika); "Extra Evil 17"
18	June 28, 2013	978-4-09-188625-5	April 19, 2016	978-1-4215-7797-5
110. "Revival Bluff" (復活ブラフ, Fukkatsu Burafu); 111. "Castle on the Lake" (湖上の楼閣, Kojō no Rōkaku); 112. "Deep House" (ディープハウス, Dīpu Hausu); 113. "Blind Labyrinth" (不覚ラビリンス, Fukaku Rabirinsu); 114. "The Wired Dead" (有線亡者, Yūsen Mōja); 115. "Cracking Tube" (クラッキングチューブ, Kurakkingu Chūbu); 116. "Smash 'n' Grab" (バラバラキャプチャー, Bara Bara Kyapuchā); 117. "Decentralized Department Store" (バラバラ百貨店, Bara Bara Hyakkaten); "Extra Evil 18"
19	June 30, 2014	978-4-09-188656-9	August 16, 2016	978-1-4215-8391-4
118. "Reunion" (邂逅, Kaigō); 119. "Evil Day Trip" (悪魔の遠足, Akuma no Ensoku); 120. "Biological Renovation" (生体リノベーション, Seitai Rinobēshon); 121. "Haru's Gym Class" (ハルの大運動会, Haru no Dai Undōkai); 122. "Pit of the Stomach" (腹の底, Hara no Soko); 123. "Rolling Heads" (おつむ転々, Otsumu Tenten); 124. "Evil's Tail" (悪魔の鳩尾, Akuma no Mizoochi); 125. "Rare Body Parts" (希少部位, Kishō Bui); 126. "Free Play" (自由行動, Jiyū Kōdō); 127. "Return of the Cycle of Life" (因縁リバース, Innen Ribāsu); "Extra Evil 19"
20	September 30, 2015	978-4-09-188684-2	January 17, 2017	978-1-4215-8710-3
128. "Last-Ditch Resurrection" (土壇場レザレクション, Dotanba Rezarekushon); 129. "Speculative Hole" (思惑のホール, Omowaku no Hōru); 130. "Extortion Completed" (強奪コンプリート, Gōdatsu Konpurīto); 131. "Control vs. Control" (支配 vs 支配, Shihai bāsasu Shihai); 132. "Lock Out & Disperse" (散り散りロックアウト, Chiri Chiri Rokku Auto); 133. "Black Town" (黒い町, Kuroi Machi); 134. "Swearing to the Remains" (残骸と誓い, Zangai to Chikai); 135. "The Devil's Gyoza" (悪魔のきまぐれギョーザ, Akuma no Kimagure Gyōza); 136. "Crazy Comeback" (ご乱心カムバック, Go Ranshin Kamubakku); 137. "Maze Trail" (迷宮トレック, Meikyū Torekku); "Extra Evil 20"
21	September 30, 2016	978-4-09-188689-7	June 20, 2017	978-1-4215-9487-3
138. "Fun Dystopia" (快適ディストピア, Kaiteki Disutopia); 139. "Setting Up For Melting Down" (融解セットアップ, Yūkai Setto Appu); 140. "Evil Gambling" (悪魔賭博, Akuma Tobaku); 141. "Wish of a Sacrifice" (生贄の願い, Ikenie no Negai); 142. "Critical Fungus" (猛菌クリティカル, Mōkin Kuritikaru); 143. "Birthday" (バースデイ, Bāsudei); 144. "Pushing the Envelope" (限界エクスパンション, Genkai Ekusupanshon); 145. "The Root of Evil" (禍根, Kakon); 146. "Full-Swing Sayonara" (さよならフルスイング, Sayonara Furu Suingu); 147. "Long-Awaited Birthday" (念願バースデイ, Nengan Bāsudei); "Extra Evil 21"
22	June 30, 2017	978-4-09-188692-7	May 15, 2018	978-1-9747-0023-3
148. "Hell Pal" (ヘル友, Heru Tomo); 149. "Nanana, the Inside of the Inside" (中の中の中はナナナ, Chū no Naka no Naka wa Nanana); 150. "Hole Gourmet Report" (ホールグルメリポート, Hōru Gurume Ripōto); 151. "Dreaming of Other Dimensions" (異空間を夢見て, Ikūkan o Yumemite); 152. "Forecast: Torrential Rain" (未来予報、のちにどしゃぶり, Mirai Yohō, Nochi ni do Shaburi); 153. "Counting Game" (ホールくん数え歌, Hōru-kun Kazoeuta); 154. "Farewell Rain" (別れの雨音, Wakare no Amaoto); 155. "I'm Caiman" (オレがカイマンだ, Ore ga Kaiman da); "Extra Evil 22"
23	November 12, 2018	978-4-09-188693-4	September 17, 2019	978-1-9747-0880-2
Special Chapter: "The Lizard Head and the Magic Whistle" (トカゲ男カイマンと魔法の苗, Tokage Otoko Kaiman to Mahō no Nae); 156. "Mushroom Defense" (茸の中の攻防, Take no Naka no Kōbō); 157. "Gyoza Magic" (その魔法はギョー意, Sono Mahō wa Gyōi); 158. "Sho Returns" (消の復活ＳＨＯＷ, Shō no Fukkatsu Shō); 159. "A Happy Reunion" (おめでとう、再会, Omedetō, Saikai); 160. "The Abyss and the Mountain" (深い穴と大きな山, Fukai Ana to Ōkina Yama); 161. "Eternal Grudge" (ウラミツラミ千年万年, Uramitsurami Chitose Mannen); 162. "A Shocking Face" (ショッキング素顔, Shokkingu Sugao); 163. "Rolling Head" (生首ころりん, Namakubi Kororin); 164. "Gyoza Barrage" (大放出ギョーザ乱れ撃ち, Dai Hōshutsu Gyōza Midare Uchi); 165. "Dorohedoro" (ドロヘドロ, Dorohedoro); 166. "Final Battle" (泣いても笑っても最終決戦, Naitemowarattemo Saishū Kessen); 167. "All-Star Sayonara" (魔の最終話 さようならオールスター, Sayōnara Ōru Sutā); "Extra Evil 23"
