= Alakazam the Great =

1960 Japanese anime musical film

- Theatrical release poster

Japanese name
- Kanji: 西遊記
Transcriptions
- Romanization: Saiyūki
- Directed by: Taiji Yabushita; Daisaku Shirakawa
- Written by: Keinosuke Uekusa
- Based on: Journey to the West by Wu Cheng'en Boku no Son Gokū by Osamu Tezuka
- Produced by: Hiroshi Okawa
- Starring: Kiyoshi Komiyama; Noriko Shindō; Hideo Kinoshita; Setsuo Shinoda
- Cinematography: Harusato Otsuka; Komei Ishikawa; Kenji Sugiyama
- Edited by: Shintaro Miyamoto; Kanjiro Igusa
- Music by: Ryoichi Hattori
- Production company: Toei Doga
- Distributed by: Toei Company
- Release date: 14 August 1960 (Japan)
- Running time: 88 minutes
- Country: Japan
- Language: Japanese

Alakazam the Great, known in Japan as Saiyūki (西遊記; lit. 'Journey to the West'), is a 1960 Japanese anime musical film, heavily based on the 16th-century Chinese novel Journey to the West. It was one of the earliest anime films to be released in the United States. Osamu Tezuka was named as a director of the film by Toei Company, but Tezuka later stated that the only time he was in the studio was to pose for publicity photos. His involvement in promoting the film, however, led to his interest in animation.

== Plot ==
One day, an unusual monkey is born from a stone. The stone monkey befriends a fellow monkey named Rin-Rin and is later crowned king of a tribe of monkeys after he proves his courage by diving into a dangerous waterfall. He becomes arrogant as king, much to his subjects' dismay and he grows insecure when he learns about the existence of humans from Rin-Rin, who claims they are the smartest beings around. The stone monkey seeks out a wise hermit and forces him to make him his pupil. The hermit teaches the stone monkey considerable magic abilities and rechristens him Son Goku. Goku shows off his new abilities to Rin-Rin, and to further impress her, goes to heaven to retrieve the sacred fruit the hermit fed him.

In heaven, Goku causes mischief, and overpowers the celestial forces sent after him. He defeats General Kinsei and takes his staff but loses a shape-shifting duel with Jiroshinkun. Goku meets Buddha, who challenges him to fly off his hand, a challenge Goku arrogantly accepts. Goku fails and is imprisoned by Buddha beneath the Five Elements Mountain. Rin-Rin takes care of Goku during his imprisonment as his arrogance gradually fades. When Rin-Rin nearly succumbs to a blizzard, she is saved by Kanon, who heralds the arrival of the monk, Genjo Sanzo, who frees Goku and asks him to accompany him to a pilgrimage to Tianzhu to retrieve a sacred sutra. Goku accepts the mission after Sanzo places an unmovable headband around him that Sanzo can tighten at will.

During their journey, Goku and Sanzo meet a father and daughter. The daughter is pursued by a monster who wants to marry her. Goku disguises himself as the girl and takes her place when the monster, the pig-man Cho Hakkai, arrives that night. Goku reveals the deception, forcing Hakkai to flee for his home, with Goku giving chase. Goku is confronted by Hakkai's half-brothers, Ginkaku and Kinkaku, who trap him in a gourd which melts anyone inside it. Goku escapes, and tries to trap the brothers in their gourd, but he is thrown into a pit with a giant scorpion. Goku narrowly defeats the scorpion and traps the two in their gourd. Goku spares Hakkai when he hears Rin-Rin's voice and allows him to accompany him and Sanzo.

Meanwhile, the imp Shoryu informs his master, Gyū-Maō, about Sanzo's pilgrimage. Gyū-Maō tasks Shoryu to lure Sanzo and company to his dominion of the Flaming Mountains so he can eat the monk and extend his lifespan. Shoryu attacks the group in the desert, scaring away Sanzo's horse and capturing him. Goku saves Sanzo, though Hakkai accidentally loses their food during the chaos. Later, the group comes across the castle of the man-eating ogre Sa Gojō. Gojō tries to eat Hakkai and Sanzo, but Goku defeats him and convinces him to join their pilgrimage.

When the group reaches the Flaming Mountains, Shoryu turns Sanzo's companions against each other, but Sanzo manages to calm them down. Gyū-Maō causes a volcanic eruption which blocks the group's path. Goku learns about the Basho-Sen, a magical fan owned by Gyū-Maō's wife, Ratsunyō, which can freeze the lava flow. He and Hakkai disguise themselves as Gyū-Maō to retrieve the fan, but are caught by Ratsunyō, who captures Hakkai while Goku escapes with the fan. Shoryu tricks Goku into giving him the fan by disguising himself as Sanzo, whom Gyū-Maō had earlier captured. Shoryu freezes Goku and pushes him into the lava. Although Goku survives, he is left paralyzed and unable to use his powers.

Gyū-Maō prepares to cook Hakkai and Sanzo for a large feast with his fellow demons. Gyū-Maō betrays Shoryu and traps him in a jar. Goku and Gojō rescue a repentant Shoryu, who gives Goku a healing potion. They rescue the others in time and fight Gyū-Maō and his group. Hakkai freezes Ratsunyō and Goku defeats Gyū-Maō, causing him to fall into lava, which Hakkai freezes with the fan. The group makes peace with Shoryu and travels to Tianzhu, where they meet with Buddha and Kanon. Buddha removes Goku's headband and gives the pilgrims the sutra. They return to China, where Goku reunites with Rin-Rin and his subjects.

== Characters ==
Journey to the West character (where applicable)	Japanese name	Japanese voice actor	English name	English voice actor
Sun Wukong	Son Gokuu	Kiyoshi Komiyama	Alakazam	Peter Fernandez (speaking); Frankie Avalon (singing)
Tang Sanzang	Hoshi Sanzō	Nobuaki Sekine	Prince Amat	Larry Robinson
Zhu Bajie	Chō Hakkai	Hideo Kinoshita	Sir Quigley Broken Bottom	Jonathan Winters
Sha Wujing	Sa Gojō	Setsuo Shinoda	Max Lulipopo	Arnold Stang
Buddha	Shakyamuni	Kunihisa Takeda	King Amo	Jack Curtis
Guanyin	Kanōn	Katsuko Ozaki	Queen Amas	Joyce Gordon
	Shōryū	Michiko Shirasaka	Filo Fester	Billie Lou Watt
	Lin-Lin	Noriko Shindo	Dee-Dee	Corinne Orr; Dodie Stevens (singing)
Bull Demon King	Gyū-Maō	Kinshiro Iwao	King Gruesome	Jack Curtis
Princess Iron Fan	Ratsunyō	Tamae Kato	Queen Gruesome	Joyce Gordon
Golden Horned King	Chō Ginkaku	Kiyoshi Kawakubo	Herman McSnarles	Bernard Grant
Silver Horned King	Chō Kinkaku	Shuichi Kazamatsuri	Vermin McSnarles	George Gonneau
Subhuti	Sen'nin	Unknown	Merlin	Unknown
Taibai Jinxing	Taihaku Kinsei	Unknown	Unknown	Unknown
Erlang Shen	Jirōshinkun	Unknown	Hercules	Unknown

== U.S. release ==
The film was released in the United States by American International on July 26, 1961.

For the American release, a few scenes were heavily edited and rearranged and bandleader Les Baxter was hired to compose a new soundtrack.

Teen idol Frankie Avalon provided the singing voice of Alakazam (with speaking voice performed by Peter Fernandez), while Dodie Stevens provided the singing voice of DeeDee (with speaking voice performed by Corinne Orr), with English-language narration provided by Sterling Holloway. Other famous voices included Jonathan Winters and Arnold Stang.

James H. Nicholson of AIP hoped the film would lead to further collaborations between AIP and Toei. He estimated the film would need to earn at least $600,000 in rentals to be profitable.

=== Critical reception ===
The Los Angeles Times called it "warm, amusing and exciting... the art work is really excellent". Variety said "picture should do quite nicely at summer b.o." Filmink called it "a really sweet movie".

It was included as one of the choices in The Fifty Worst Films of All Time, and is the only animated film featured in the book.

=== Box office ===
The film was a great success in Japan but a flop in the United States, despite a large marketing budget and heavy promotion. The film also did poorly in other countries where AIP released, and was banned in Denmark and Norway due to its horror elements. AIP cancelled plans to co produce other animated films with Toei (the first of which was to be Sinbad) as well as a proposed part-animation-part-live action film, Ali Baba and the Seven Wonders of the World.

Matt Alt, in Pure Invention, wrote that the film "flopped so terrifically" in Western countries.

According to Variety it and another Japanese cartoon film released by the US, Magic Boy, earned a combined $425,000 in rentals in North America.

== Home media ==
The AIP version of the film was first released on VHS in the 1980s by HBO/Cannon Video (under licensed from then-owner Orion Pictures). This release was reissued by Congress Video Group in 1990 at a slower speed. Orion Home Video re-released the film in both pan-and-scan and widescreen letterbox VHS editions and on a widescreen laserdisc in 1995. Although MGM Home Entertainment has not released the film on DVD, the AIP version has been made available for streaming on Netflix and Amazon Prime Video.

== In popular culture ==
The Mario video game franchise antagonist Bowser was inspired by the film. Nintendo designer Shigeru Miyamoto received inspiration for the character's appearance from the anime film. He had first envisioned Bowser as an ox, basing him on the Ox-King from the film.

== See also ==
- Havoc in Heaven
- List of animated feature films
- List of Osamu Tezuka anime
- List of Osamu Tezuka manga
- Osamu Tezuka's Star System
