= Doraemon =

Japanese manga series by Fujiko F. Fujio

- First tankōbon volume cover, featuring Doraemon

ドラえもん
- Genre: Comedy; Science fiction
- Manga
- Written by: Fujiko F. Fujio (Note: Credited as Fujiko Fujio until 1988.)
- Published by: Shogakukan
- English publisher: CN: 21st Century Publishing House (bilingual English-Chinese); JP: Shogakukan (bilingual); NA: Fujiko Pro; SG: Shogakukan Asia; Chuang Yi (bilingual English-Chinese); TW: Chingwin Publishing Group (bilingual English-Chinese)
- Imprint: Tentōmushi Comics
- Magazine: CoroCoro Comic and other Shogakukan children's magazines
- Original run: 1969 – 1996
- Anime television series
- 1973 anime series; 1979 anime series; 2005 anime series
- Other manga
- Doraemon's Long Tales; The Doraemons
- Other media
- List of Doraemon films; List of Doraemon video games; List of Doraemon soundtrack albums
- icon

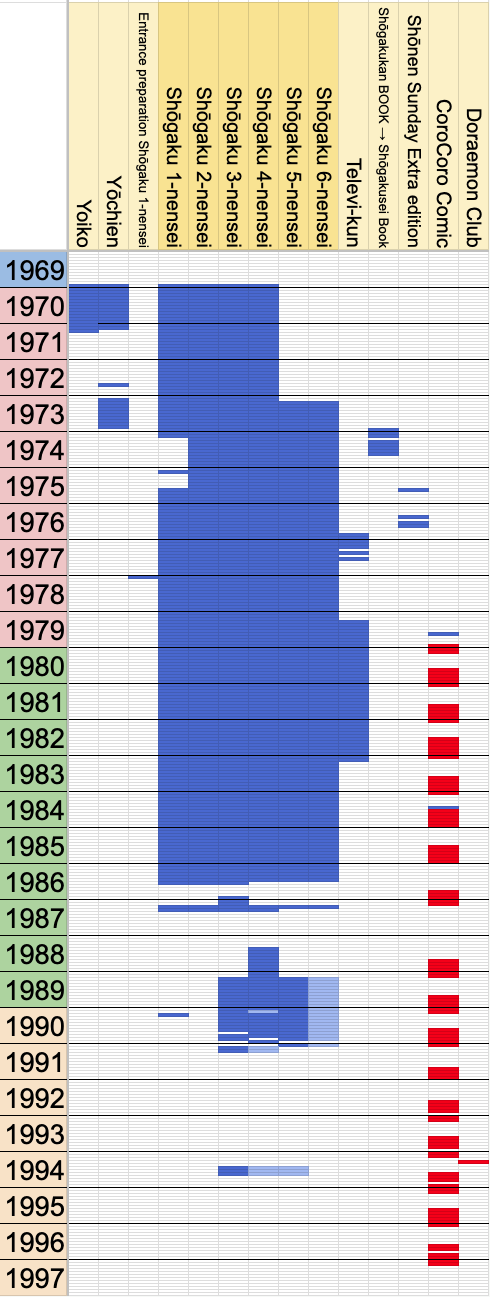
A timeline of magazines in which the manga's chapters (blue) or its long stories (red) were published

Doraemon (Japanese: ドラえもん) is a Japanese manga series written and illustrated by Fujiko F. Fujio. First serialized in 1969, the manga's selected chapters were collected in 45 tankōbon volumes published by Shogakukan from 1974 to 1996. The story revolves around an earless robotic cat named Doraemon, who travels back in time from the 22nd century to assist a boy named Nobita Nobi in his day-to-day life.

The manga spawned a media franchise. It was adapted into three different anime television series in 1973, 1979, and 2005. Additionally, Shin-Ei Animation has produced over forty animated films, including two CGI-animated films, all of which are distributed by Toho. Various types of merchandise and media have been developed, including soundtrack albums, video games, and musicals. The manga series was licensed for an English language release in North America via Amazon Kindle, through a collaboration of Fujiko F. Fujio Pro with Voyager Japan and AltJapan Co., Ltd. The anime series was licensed by Viz Media for an English-language release in North America in 2014, and LUK International in Europe, the Middle East and Africa.

Doraemon was well received by critics and became a commercial success in many Asian countries. It won numerous awards, including the Japan Cartoonists Association Award in 1973 and 1994, the Shogakukan Manga Award for children's manga in 1982, and the Tezuka Osamu Cultural Prize in 1997. As of 2024, it has sold over 300 million copies worldwide, making it one of the best-selling manga series of all time. The titular character is considered a Japanese cultural icon and was appointed as the first "anime ambassador" in 2008 by the country's Foreign Ministry.

== Synopsis ==
Set in 20th century Tokyo, Japan, the series revolves around Nobita Nobi, a ten-year-old school boy who is kind-hearted and honest, but also lazy, clumsy, and hapless, performing poorly in both school and sports. One day, a blue robot cat from the 22nd century named Doraemon is sent back to the past by Nobita's future great-great-grandson, Sewashi Nobi, to take care of Nobita so that his descendants can have a better life. Doraemon has a four-dimensional pocket in which he stores tools, inventions, and gadgets from the future to aid Nobita whenever he is faced with a problem. Although Doraemon is a cat robot, he has a fear of mice because of an incident where robotic mice chewed off his ears. Afterwards, Doraemon lost his original yellow color and turned blue from sadness.

Nobita has three main friends: Takeshi Goda (nicknamed Gian), Suneo Honekawa (Gian's sidekick), and Shizuka Minamoto (Nobita's love interest). Gian is a strong, leading and domineering boy, but also loyal to his friends. Suneo is a wealthy and spoiled boy who uses his friendship with Gian to win the respect of other schoolmates. Shizuka is a gentle and kind girl who frequently plays with Nobita. Nobita has a crush on Shizuka; she is his prospective future wife (Nobita's future wife is initially Gian's younger sister). Although Gian and Suneo are Nobita's friends, they also typically bully and abuse him. Nobita normally responds by using Doraemon's gadgets to fight back against them, but Nobita has a tendency to get carried away with using the gadgets (or Gian and Suneo, if they steal it away), which typically results in unintended consequences for him and others.

Dorami and Hidetoshi Dekisugi are also recurring characters. Dorami is Doraemon's younger sister, and Dekisugi is a gifted student boy who, as Shizuka's close friend, frequently attracts the jealousy of Nobita.

== Production ==
=== Development and themes ===
Doraemon was written and illustrated by Fujiko F. Fujio, the pen name of Japanese manga artist Hiroshi Fujimoto. According to Fujio, the series was originally conceived following a series of three events: when searching for ideas for a new manga, he wished a machine existed that would come up with ideas for him; during this, he tripped over his daughter's toy, and heard cats fighting in his neighborhood. To set up the plot and characters, he used some elements from his earlier manga series, Obake no Q-Tarō, which involve an obake living with humans, with a similar formula. Fujio said that the idea for Doraemon came after "an accumulation of trial and error", during which he finally found the most suitable style of manga to him. Initially, the series achieved little success as gekiga was well known at the time, and it only became a hit after its adaptation into an anime TV series and multiple feature films.

Doraemon is mainly aimed at children, so Fujio chose to create the character with a simple graphic style, based on shapes such as circles and ellipses. He used the same sequences of cartoons with regularity and continuity to enhance the reader's ease of understanding. In addition, blue, a characteristic color of Doraemon, was chosen as the main color in magazine publications, which used to have a yellow cover and red title. Set in Tokyo, the manga reflected parts of Japan's society, such as the class system and the "ideal" of Japanese childhood. Problems, if they occurred, were resolved in a way so as not to rely on violence and eroticism, and the stories were integrated with the concept of environmentalism. The manga also insisted on the ethical values of integrity, perseverance, courage, family and respect.

In order to underline the crucial role of the younger generation in society, the manga's creator chose to have the act carried out in a "children's domain" where young people can live with happiness, freedom and power without adult interference. As Saya S. Shiraishi noted, the existence of the "domain" helped Doraemon to have a strong appeal in various Asian countries. During Doraemon's development, Fujio did not express a change in characters; he said, "When a manga hero become a success, the manga suddenly stops being interesting. So the hero has to be like the stripes on a barber pole; he seems to keep moving upward, but actually he stays in the same place."

According to Zensho Ito, Fujio's former student, the "length" of time in the universe is one of the ideas that inspired Fujio to make Doraemon. Frequently displayed in its stories is Nobita's desire to control time, and there exist time-control gadgets that he uses to satisfy that desire, particularly the "Time Machine", which lies in his desk drawer. Unlike Western works of science fiction, the manga does not explain the theory nor the applied technology behind these tools, but instead focuses on how the characters exploit them to their advantage, making it more child-friendly.

=== Origin of name ===
The name "Doraemon" can be roughly translated to "stray". Unusually, the name "Doraemon" (ドラえもん) is written in a mixture of two Japanese scripts: katakana (ドラ) and hiragana (えもん). "Dora" derives from "dora neko" (どら猫; stray cat), and is a corruption of nora ("stray"), while "-emon" (in kanji 右衛門) is an old-fashioned suffix for male names (for example, as in Ishikawa Goemon).

The name "Nobita Nobi" refers to "nobi nobi", meaning "the way a young child grows up free, healthy, and happy, unrestrained in any sense".

The name "Tsukimidai-Susukigahara", the fictional neighborhood in Nerima Ward, Tokyo where Nobita Nobi and his friends live, (Note: Suneo Honekawa's address is 3-10-5 Tsukimidai-Susukigahara, Nerima Ward, Tokyo (東京都練馬区月見台すすきヶ原3-10-5) in the manga.) refers to the Fujimidai neighborhood, where Osamu Tezuka's residence and animation studio, Mushi Production, is based.

=== Gadgets ===
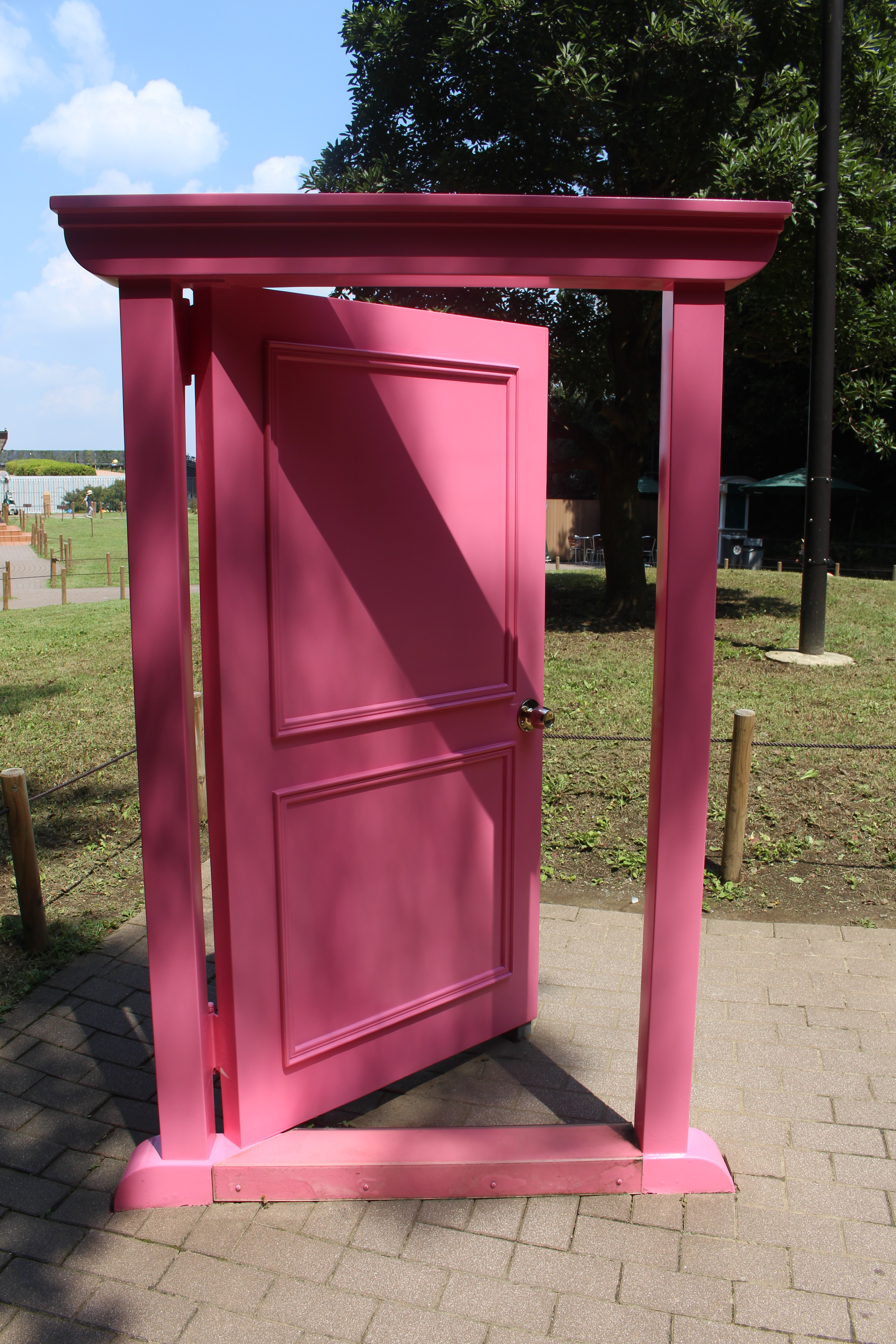
"Anywhere Door", a gadget in the manga series as seen in the Fujiko F. Fujio Museum.

Gadgets, or "himitsu dōgu" (ひみつ道具), are Doraemon's hi-tech tools from the future, used to assist the characters. Fujio said that Doraemon has a total of 1,293 gadgets; according to a 2004 analysis by Yasuyuki Yokoyama of Toyama University, there are 1,963 gadgets found in 1,344 sketches. The most recurring gadgets include "Take-Copter", a small piece of headgear made out of bamboo that can allow its users to fly; "Time Machine", a machine used for time travel; "Anywhere Door", a pink-colored door that allows people to travel according to the thoughts of the person who turns the knob; "Time Kerchief", a handkerchief which can turn an object new or old or a person young or old; "Translator Tool", a cuboid jelly that allows one to converse in any language; and "Designer", a camera used to instantly dress-up the user.

Saya S. Shiraishi wrote that most of the gadgets were "an impressive testimony to the standards of quality control and innovation that exist in the twenty-second century". The gadgets are an essential part of the series so as to reflect a positive point of view concerning the association of technology in children, and to express the wishes of modern society.

=== Conclusion ===
The series ceased its original run in 1994 and was not given an ending before Fujimoto's death in 1996; this has since aroused numerous urban legends throughout the years. One of the most well-known "endings" of the manga was by an amateur manga cartoonist under the pen name "Yasue T. Tajima", first appearing on the Internet in 1998 and made into a manga in 2005. The story takes place when Doraemon's battery dies, and Nobita later grows up becoming a robot engineer, potentially reviving Doraemon and live a happy life. Tajima issued an apology making his own ending in 2007, and the profits were shared with Shogakukan and the copyright owner, Fujiko F. Fujio Pro.

Ryūichi Yagi and Takashi Yamazaki, the directors of Stand by Me Doraemon, confirmed that it had only one opening, while the ending has been rewritten several times. Because of this, Shogakukan had to clarify that only if the marriage of Nobita and Shizuka is finalized will the mission be accomplished, and then Doraemon will return to the future.

== Media ==
=== Manga ===
Main tankōbon
Title	Note	Label	Volumes	Chapter count	Publication date	Publisher
Doraemon		The Complete Works of Fujiko F. Fujio	20	1326	2009–2012	Shogakukan
Doraemon		Kindle Edition	200	1311	2013–2016	Shogakukan
Doraemon		Chūkō comics: Fujiko Fujio Land	45	833	1984–1990	Chūōkōronsha
Doraemon	Normal volume	Tentōmushi Comics	45	822	1974–1996	Shogakukan
Doraemon Plus		Tentōmushi Comics	7	145	2005–2006, 2014, 2023	Shogakukan
Doraemon Color Works		Tentōmushi Comics Special	6	119	1999–2006	Shogakukan
Doraemon	Volume 0	Tentōmushi Comics	1	9	2019	Shogakukan

The first appearance of Doraemon, who arrives via a time machine

In December 1969, the Doraemon manga appeared in six different children's monthly magazines published by Shogakukan: Yoiko, Yōchien, Shogaku Ichi-nensei, Shogaku Ni-nensei, Shogaku San-nensei, and Shogaku Yo-nensei. The magazines were aimed at children from nursery school to fourth grade. In 1973, two other magazines, Shogaku Go-nensei and Shogaku Roku-nensei (aimed at fifth-grade and sixth-grade students respectively), started publishing the manga. In 1977, CoroCoro Comic was launched as the flagship magazine of Doraemon.

Since the debut of Doraemon in 1969, the stories have been selectively collected into forty-five tankōbon volumes that were published under Shogakukan's Tentōmushi Comics (てんとう虫コミックス) imprint from July 31, 1974, to April 26, 1996. These volumes are collected in the Takaoka Central Library in Toyama, Japan, where Fujio was born. Between April 25, 2005, and February 28, 2006, Shōgakukan published a series of five manga volumes under the title Doraemon Plus (Doraemon+), featuring short stories which did not appear in the forty-five original volumes; a sixth volume was published on December 1, 2014. Additionally, 119 unpublished stories were compiled into six colored-manga volumes under the title Doraemon Kara Sakuhin-shu (ドラえもん カラー作品集; Doraemon Color Works), published from July 17, 1999, to September 2, 2006. Between July 24, 2009, and September 25, 2012, Shogakukan published a master works collection, consisting of twenty volumes with all 1,345 stories written by Fujio. In December 2019, on the 50th anniversary of Doraemon, a "Volume 0" was published by Shogakukan featuring six different versions of Doraemon's first appearance.

There have been two series of bilingual, Japanese and English, volumes of the manga by Shogakukan English Comics under the title Doraemon: Gadget Cat from the Future, and two audio versions. The first series has ten volumes and the second one has six. 21st Century Publishing House released bilingual English-Chinese versions in mainland China, Chingwin Publishing Group released bilingual English-Chinese versions in Taiwan, and Chuang Yi published Chinese-English versions in Singapore.

In July 2013, Fujiko F. Fujio Pro announced they would collaborate with ebook publisher Voyager Japan and localization company AltJapan Co., Ltd. to release an English-language version of the manga in full color digitally via the Amazon Kindle platform in North America. Shogakukan released the first volume in November 2013; by 2016, a total of 200 volumes have been published. The Fujiko F. Fujio Pro English version incorporates a variety of changes to character names; Nobita is "Noby", Shizuka is "Sue", Suneo is "Sneech", and Gian is "Big G", while the food dorayaki is "Yummy Bun/Fudgy Pudgy Pie". Also, by 2016, four volumes of the manga had been published in English in print by Shogakukan Asia.

Shogakukan started digital distribution of all forty-five original volumes throughout Japan from July 16, 2015.

==== Long Stories ====
Doraemon's Long Tales, also known as Doraemon's Long Stories, is a manga and movie series ongoing since 1979, featuring longer and continuous narratives about the characters' adventures into various lands of science fiction and fantasy. The series consists of twenty-four tankōbon volumes published from 1983 to 2004.

==== Spin-offs ====
Several spin-off manga series of Doraemon have been made. The Doraemons, a manga illustrated by Michiaki Tanaka based on Doraemon, was published by Shogakukan in six tankōbon volumes from 1996 to 2001. Between 1997 and 2003, Shogakukan also published fifteen volumes of The Doraemons Special, created by Yukihiro Mitani and Masaru Miyazaki as a complement part of The Doraemons, including twelve from the main series and three from the Robot Training School Edition. Dorabase, a baseball-themed manga written and illustrated by Mugiwara Shintarō, is another spin-off of Doraemon; twenty-three volumes of the manga were published by Shogakukan from April 26, 2001, to October 28, 2011.

=== Anime ===
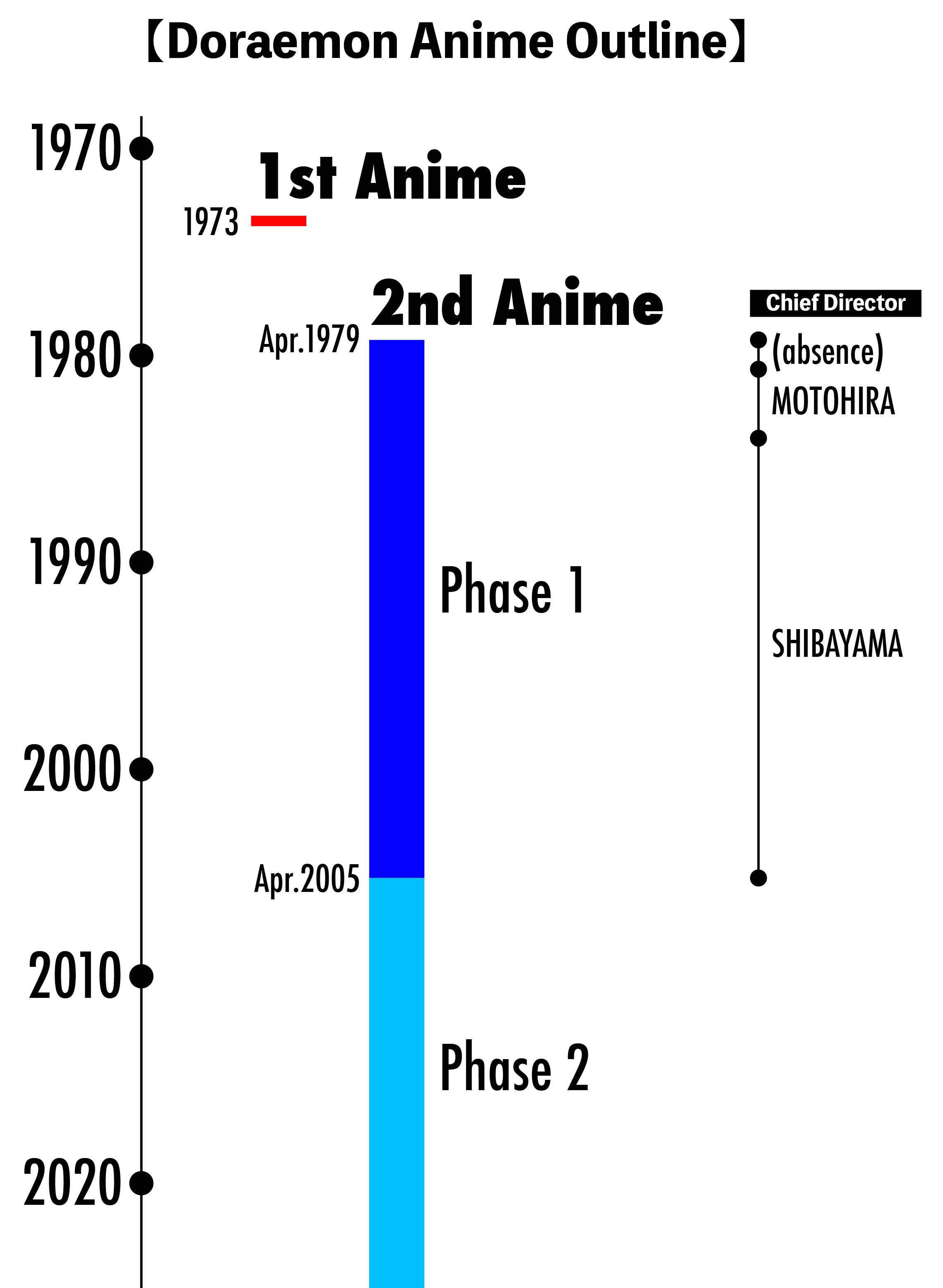
Timeline of Doraemon anime

The first attempt of a Doraemon animated series was in 1973, by Nippon Television. After a January 1973 pilot named Doraemon Mirai Kara Yattekuru (ドラえもんが未来からやってくる; Doraemon Coming from the Future), twenty-six episodes, each with two segments, were broadcast on Nippon TV from April 1 to September 30 of the same year. The series was directed by Mitsuo Kaminashi with a voice cast from Aoni Production; Doraemon was voiced by Kōsei Tomita, then later by Masako Nozawa. Later in the series, the animation studio, Nippon TeleMovie Productions, went bankrupt, and the masters were sold off or destroyed. The series re-aired on Nippon TV and several local stations until 1979, when Shogakukan requested Toyama Television to cease broadcasting. Some of the segments were found in the archives of Imagica in 1995, and some others were recovered by Jun Masami in 2003. As of 2013, 21 of 52 segments are known to survive, two of which have no audio.

Doraemon remained fairly exclusive in manga form until 1979 when an animation studio, Shin-Ei Animation (now owned by TV Asahi) produced an animated second attempt of Doraemon. The series debuted on TV Asahi on April 2, 1979. Ryo Motohira served as chief director from 1981, and Tsutomu Shibayama from 1984. Eiichi Nakamura served as director of character design, while Shunsuke Kikuchi served as composer. Nobuyo Ōyama voiced Doraemon in the series; because of this, in Asia, this version is sometimes referred to as the Ōyama Edition. In total, 1,787 episodes were produced and released in VHS and DVD by Toho. On April 15, 2005, a major renewal premiered; it includes the replacement of voice actors and staff, and updated character designs. The third series is sometimes referred to in Asia as the Mizuta Edition, as a tribute for the voice actress for Doraemon, Wasabi Mizuta. It was released in DVD on February 10, 2006, under the title New TV-ban Doraemon (NEW TV 版 ドラえもん; Doraemon NEW TV Version) with a Shogakukan Video banner.

In May 2014, TV Asahi Corporation announced an agreement with The Walt Disney Company to bring the 2005 series to the Disney XD television channel in the United States beginning in the summer of that year. Besides using the name changes that were used in AltJapan's English adaptation of the original manga, other changes and edits had also been made to make the show more accessible to an American audience, such as Japanese text being replaced with English text on certain objects like signs and graded papers, items such as yen notes being replaced by US dollar bills, and the setting being changed from Japan to the United States. Initial response to the edited dub was positive. The Disney adaptation began broadcast in Japan on Disney Channel on February 1, 2016. The broadcast offered the choice of the English dub or a newly recorded Japanese track by the Japanese cast of the 2005 series.

The anime has been aired in over sixty countries worldwide. It premiered in Thailand in 1982, the Philippines in 1999, India in 2005, and Vietnam in 2010. Other Asian countries and regions that broadcast the series include China, Hong Kong, Singapore, Taiwan, Malaysia, Indonesia, and South Korea. The series is licensed in EMEA regions by LUK Internacional; it premiered in Spain in 1993 and France in 2003. It has also been distributed in South American countries, including Brazil, Colombia, and Chile. In 2017, POPS Worldwide, a Vietnamese multimedia company, collaborated with TV Asahi to release the anime series on YouTube and other digital platforms.

In June 2026, TV Asahi announced that they had partnered with British distributor Cake Entertainment to secure exclusive distribution rights to the anime catalogue globally outside Asia, as well as to produce new English dubs of the series. The deal excludes EMEA rights in Italy, Spain, Portugal, and Turkey, which their respective partners retain.

==== Films ====
As of 2026, there have been 45 annual feature-length animated films produced by Shin-Ei Animation and released by Toho. The first twenty-five films are based on the 1979 anime, while the rest are based on the 2005 anime. Unlike the anime and manga series, the films are more action-adventure oriented, taking the familiar characters of Doraemon and placing them in a variety of exotic and perilous settings.

A 3D computer-animated film, Stand by Me Doraemon, released in Japan on August 8, 2014. Directed by Takashi Yamazaki and Ryūichi Yagi, it combines elements from the short stories of the manga series: "All the Way from the Country of the Future", "Imprinting Egg", "Goodbye, Shizuka-chan", "Romance in Snowy Mountain", "Nobita's the Night Before a Wedding", and "Goodbye, Doraemon ..." into a new complete story, from the first time Doraemon came to Nobita's house to Doraemon bidding farewell to Nobita. The film was a box office success, grossing $183.4 million worldwide. A sequel, Stand by Me Doraemon 2, also directed by Yamazaki and Yagi, was released on November 20, 2020.

==== Short films, OVA and crossover ====
Several Doraemon short films were produced and released between 1989 and 2004. These include 2112: The Birth of Doraemon, a film about the life of Doraemon from birth before coming to Nobita; Doraemon: Nobita's the Night Before a Wedding, a film about the events related to the marriage of Nobita and Shizuka; The Day When I Was Born and Doraemon: A Grandmother's Recollections, the films about the relationship between Nobita and his parents along with his grandmother. Other short films focus on Dorami and The Doraemons. In 1981, Toho released What Am I for Momotaro, a film about Momotarō, the hero of Japanese folklore.

In 1994, an educational OVA was made, titled Doraemon: Nobita to Mirai Note (ドラえもん のび太と未来ノート), where the main characters express the hope for a better Earth. The OVA was released in DVD along with the 13th issue of Fujiko F. Fujio Wonderland magazine in September 2004. A crossover episode of Doraemon with AIBOU: Tokyo Detective Duo aired on TV Asahi on November 9, 2018.

==== Music ====
The soundtrack of the 1973 anime series was composed by Nobuyoshi Koshibe, who also arranged the opening theme song "Doraemon" (ドラえもん) and the ending theme song "Doraemon Rumba" (ドラえもん ルンバ), both performed by Harumi Naitō. For the 1979 anime, Shunsuke Kikuchi was the composer, who arranged "Doraemon no Uta" (ドラえもんのうた); it had been performed by numerous singers, including Kumiko Ōsugi and Satoko Yamano. When the anime got a reboot in 2005, Kan Sawada was the composer of the series. There are four other opening themes, including an instrumental version of "Doraemon no Uta" performed by Twelve Girls Band; "Hagushichao" (ハグしちゃお) performed by Rimi Natsukawa; "Yume wo Kanaete Doraemon" (夢をかなえてドラえもん), the opening theme broadcast from 2007 to 2018; and "Doraemon" performed by Gen Hoshino, broadcast since October 2019.

Numerous collections of theme songs of the anime series and feature films were initially available in cassettes. Since the 1990s, Doraemon songs have been released in CD, under the type of singles and compilation albums. Soundtracks of Doraemon feature films have been released by Nippon Columbia since 2001 in the album series "Doraemon Soundtrack History" (ドラえもんサウンドトラックヒストリー).

=== Musical shows ===
Doraemon has been adapted into a musical, titled Doraemon the Musical: Nobita and the Animal Planet (舞台版ドラえもん のび太とアニマル惑星(プラネット), Butaiban Doraemon: Nobita to Animaru Puranetto). Based on the 1990 anime film of the same name, it debuted at Tokyo Metropolitan Art Space on September 4, 2008, running through September 14. Shoji Kokami was the director and writer, Makoto Sakamoto played Nobita and Reiko Suho as Shizuka; Jaian and Suneo were portrayed by Tomohiro Waki and Kensaku Kobayashi, respectively; Wasabi Mizuta voiced Doraemon. The musical was later revived and ran at Sunshine Theater, Tokyo from March 26 to April 2, 2017, then later in other prefectures including Fukuoka, Osaka, Miyagi and Aichi. The 2017 revival is also directed and written by Kokami, with Mizuta reprising her role; Nobita, Shizuka, Jaian and Suneo were played by Yuuchi Ogoe, Hina Higuchi, Koki Azuma and Shō Jinnai, respectively.

=== Video games ===
Many Japanese-only video games based on Doraemon have been developed. In 1983, Bandai developed Dokodemo Dorayaki Doraemon (どこでも ドラヤキ ドラえもん), an arcade game inspired by Pac-Man. Doraemon, a NES video game made by Hudson Soft, was released on December 12, 1986, and became one of the best-selling games of that year in Japan with over 1.15 million copies sold. On December 6, 2007, Sega published Doraemon Wii, the first Doraemon video game released on Wii. Doraemon can also be seen in Namco's Taiko no Tatsujin rhythm game series, such as in Taiko no Tatsujin: Sesson de Dodon ga Don! (2017). The first Doraemon game to receive a Western release was Doraemon Story of Seasons (2019). Card games with Doraemon themes have also been made in several special occasions, sometimes to exploit the popularity of feature films. In 2016, a special edition of Uno about the series' characters was released exclusively in Japan, as a result of a cooperation between Asatsu-DK and Mattel. In April 2025, CTW announced Doraemon Comic Traveler (ドラえもん コミックトラベラー), the first online browser game based on the series, on its gaming platform G123.

=== Merchandise ===
In Japan, the Doraemon merchandising rights belong to Shogakukan-Shueisha Productions, which has produced and distributed a wide range of products under its brand, such as toys, food, stationery, action figures, gashapon, shoes, clothing, and others. Several companies have collaborated on the creation and distribution of products on the series and its characters, including Sanrio, Converse, Moleskine, and ESP Guitars, which has made guitars decorated with Doraemon characters; a further partnership of Doraemon with Uniqlo led to a line of clothing designed by Takashi Murakami. The Doraemon franchise has also collaborated with various Japanese brands, including Tsi Groove & Sports's Jack Bunny!! golf apparel brand, Unicharm's MamiPoko diaper brand, and the video games LINE Pop 2, Monster Strike, and Granblue Fantasy. Viz Media owns the Doraemon merchandising rights in North and Latin America, which has developed Doraemon-themed clothing and collectibles in collaboration with retail chain Hot Topic, and themed Happy Meals in a 2015 collaboration with McDonald's. Viz Media Europe (now Crunchyroll EMEA) manages the merchandising in Europe except Spain and Portugal; LUK International has obtained licenses in these two countries.

Characters from Doraemon have been used in advertising through specific agreements with Shogakukan. For instance, following the Cool Japan initiative promoted by the Japanese government, Sharp Corporation produced a series of commercials featuring the characters of Doraemon and Nobita, which were broadcast in several ASEAN countries. In late 2011, Shogakukan and Toyota joined forces to create a series of live-action commercials as part of Toyota's ReBorn ad campaign, which depicted the manga's characters two decades after being grown up, where Hollywood actor Jean Reno played Doraemon.

== Reception ==
=== General ===
Doraemon is considered one of the best-known manga of all time, a true Japanese cultural icon, and an essential part of family life of the Japanese post-war generation. Akihiro Motoyama observed that "mothers who watched the movies when they were children are now taking their own children to see them". It was also commercially successful: over 108 million volumes were sold in Japan by 1996. The 1979 and 2005 anime series also achieved high ratings on television. With the film Doraemon: Nobita's Secret Gadget Museum, the Doraemon anime film series reached 100 million tickets sold at the Japanese box office, surpassing Godzilla as the highest-grossing film franchise in Japan. By 2015, it had sold over 103 million tickets, and was the largest franchise by numbers of admissions in the country.

Doraemon was also a hit in other parts of Asia, and is considered an archetypical example of Japanese soft power, although it has been published without a license in some countries. The anime television series is available in over 60 countries, and reportedly getting high ratings in at least 30 countries. However, Doraemon has been less successful in Western countries, due to being viewed by many as a children-only series, and there were tight restrictions about publishing manga and broadcasting anime series the region. The manga had sold over 170 million copies worldwide by 2012; over 250 million by 2019; and over 300 million by 2024. Estimates show that Doraemon has generated at least more than $4.3 billion in merchandise sales by 2019, (Note: Doraemon licensed merchandise sales: Royalties (1979–1994) – ¥15.3 billion ($153 million); Japan (1999–2000, 2003, 2005, 2007, 2010) – ¥223.75 billion ($2.549 billion); 1999 – ¥84.21 billion; 2000 – ¥50 billion; 2003 – ¥30 billion; 2005 – ¥24.96 billion; 2007 – ¥17.6 billion; 2010 – ¥16.98 billion; Worldwide (2015–2016) – $1.108 billion; 2015 – $557 million; 2016 – $551 million; Japan (2018–2019) – ¥64.01 billion ($587 million)) and over $1.7 billion from feature films by 2020, making it one of the highest-grossing media franchises of all time.

Outside Japan, Doraemon achieved particular success in Vietnam, with a record-breaking 40 million copies sold by 2006. The manga was first launched there in 1992 by Kim Đồng Publishing House, but the copyright from Shogakukan was not fully acquired until 1996. In 1993, the Vietnamese Ministry of Culture considered the manga's publication to be "an impactful event for the improvement of children, youth and adult's likings ... [Doraemon] is a comprehensively educational book series which has the effect of developing children's personality". Doraemon is now a cultural icon in Vietnam, having been featured at many cultural events.

=== Critical reception and analysis ===
Doraemon has received favorable reviews. Critic Mark Schilling wrote, "For kids whose lives are often so regulated, Doraemon represents a welcome breath of freedom and a glimpse of a funnier, friendlier world where all dreams, even foolish ones, can come true." Italian writer Massimo Nicora wrote that the manga "can be interpreted as a type of book that criticizes, with irony, the omnipotence of science that pretends to solve every problem with its tools", alluding to the fact that Doraemon's gadgets often end up making the problems even worse than they initially were, more than anything else. He added that it represents "the metaphor of the childish imagination, which always manages to find the most bizarre and original solutions, in a continuous game of transformation of reality".

Some critics considered that Nobita's flawed personality and modest background is different from the special or extraordinary characteristics usually seen in other typical anime and manga protagonists; this portrayal has been seen as reasons of its appeal as well as the contrary, especially in the United States. According to the Italian Parents Movement (Moige), in the manga, "the lazy Nobita does not know any kind of appreciable evolution", though there are still good points including "the criticism of bullying, the goodness that transpires from the little Nobita and the positive figure of Shizuka".

In his 2000 article, Leo Ching explained that the success of Doraemon in Asia was due to reflecting Asian values such as imagination and responsibility, the same reason that Oshin, another Japanese cultural export, became well known there. On the other hand, according to an analysis by Anne Allison, professor of cultural anthropology at Duke University, the strong point of it was not the variety of the gadgets, but the relationship between Doraemon and Nobita, which was particularly appreciated. Jason Thompson praised the "silly situations" and "old fashioned, simple artwork", with Doraemon's expression and comments adding to the "surrounding elementary-school mischief". On the manga's 50th anniversary, an op-ed published on Asahi Shimbun stated that the manga "has already become a contemporary classic".

=== Awards, accolades and public recognition ===
Doraemon has received numerous accolades. It won the Japan Cartoonists Association Award twice in 1973 and 1994, the former for the Excellence Award while the latter for the Minister of Education, Science and Technology Award. In 1982, it received the first Shogakukan Manga Award for children's manga. In 1997, the manga won the Grand Prize at the first Tezuka Osamu Cultural Prize. The 1979 series won the award from the Japanese Agency for Cultural Affairs four times for best television series in 1984, 1985, 1988 and 1989.

A 2006 poll among 80,000 Japanese fans for the 10th anniversary of the Japan Media Arts Festival placed Doraemon at fifth among the top ten best manga of all time. The 2005 and 2006 surveys conducted by TV Asahi found the Doraemon anime ranked fifth and third, respectively, among the 100 favorite anime series of all time. In 2010, a survey conducted by researchers of Tokyo Polytechnic University found that most responders considered Doraemon, along with Dragon Ball franchise, to be the anime series that best represents Cool Japan. In a 2013 survey, Doraemon was found to be the best anime recommended for foreign people.

=== Criticism ===
Doraemon has been blamed for having a negative impact on children, due to the controversial traits of the characters in the anime. The character has received criticism in China, where some media outlets considered Doraemon to be a politically subversive character and that it was a tool of Japan's "cultural invasion". Some education groups in Taiwan demanded the anime to be banned, as the plot involves bullying, which was feared would encourage campus bullying. In 2016, a resolution to ban the Hindi-dubbed Doraemon anime series was submitted in Pakistan. Around the same time, legal notices were served against several companies in India, targeting Doraemon and Crayon Shin-chan for bans (which did not materialize), as having an adverse effect on children. Disney Channel India, the regional broadcaster of the anime, was banned in Bangladesh and Pakistan due to the non-availability of localized dubs for content including Doraemon. An episode featuring Nobita studying studying abroad in India, which aired on November 7, 2026, caused controversy in Japan, with many right-wing Japanese Twitter users criticizing it for depicting the coexistence of Indian and Japanese cultures.

== Cultural impact and legacy ==
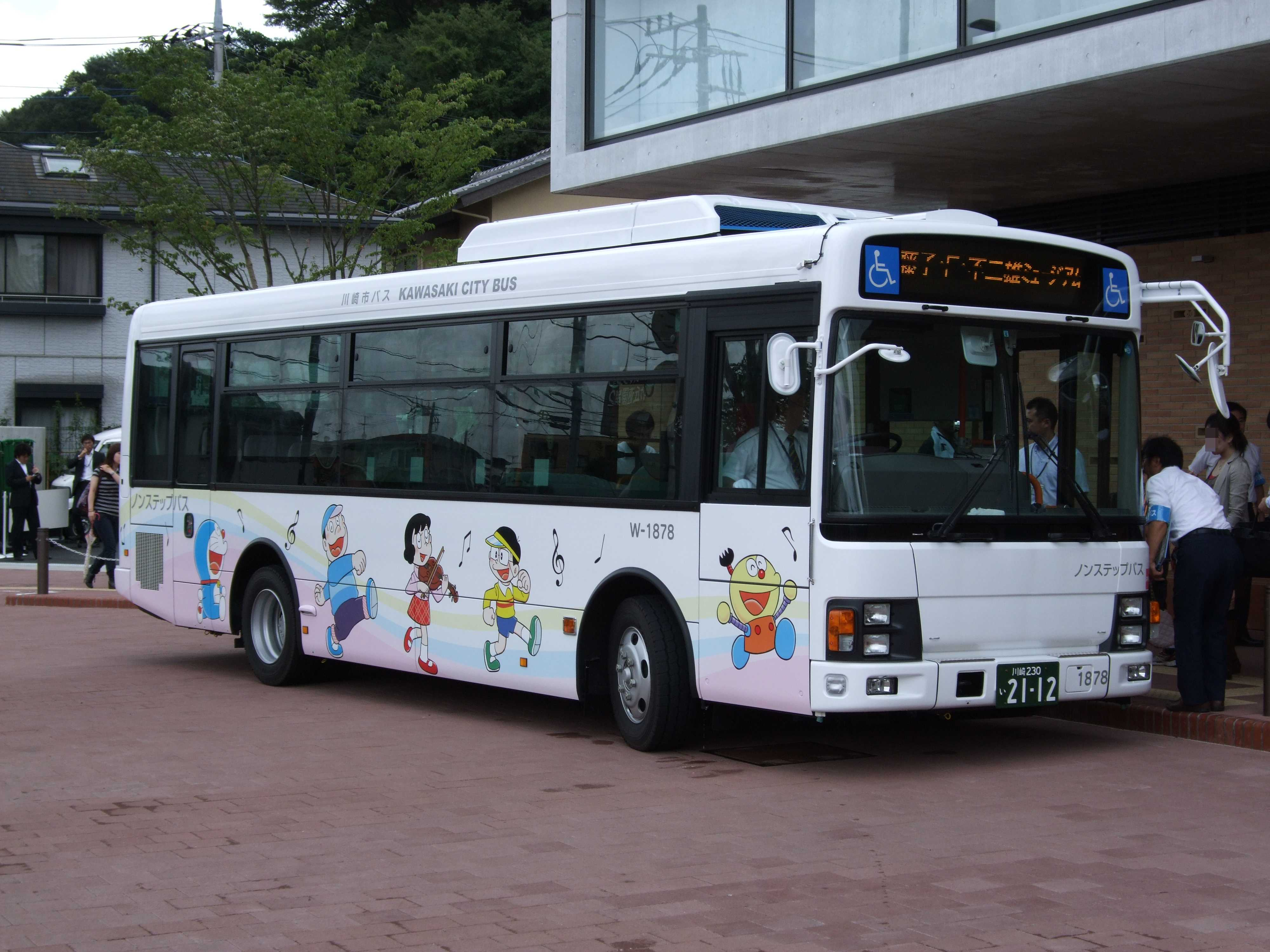
Shuttle bus featuring Doraemon to Fujiko F. Fujio Museum in Kawasaki

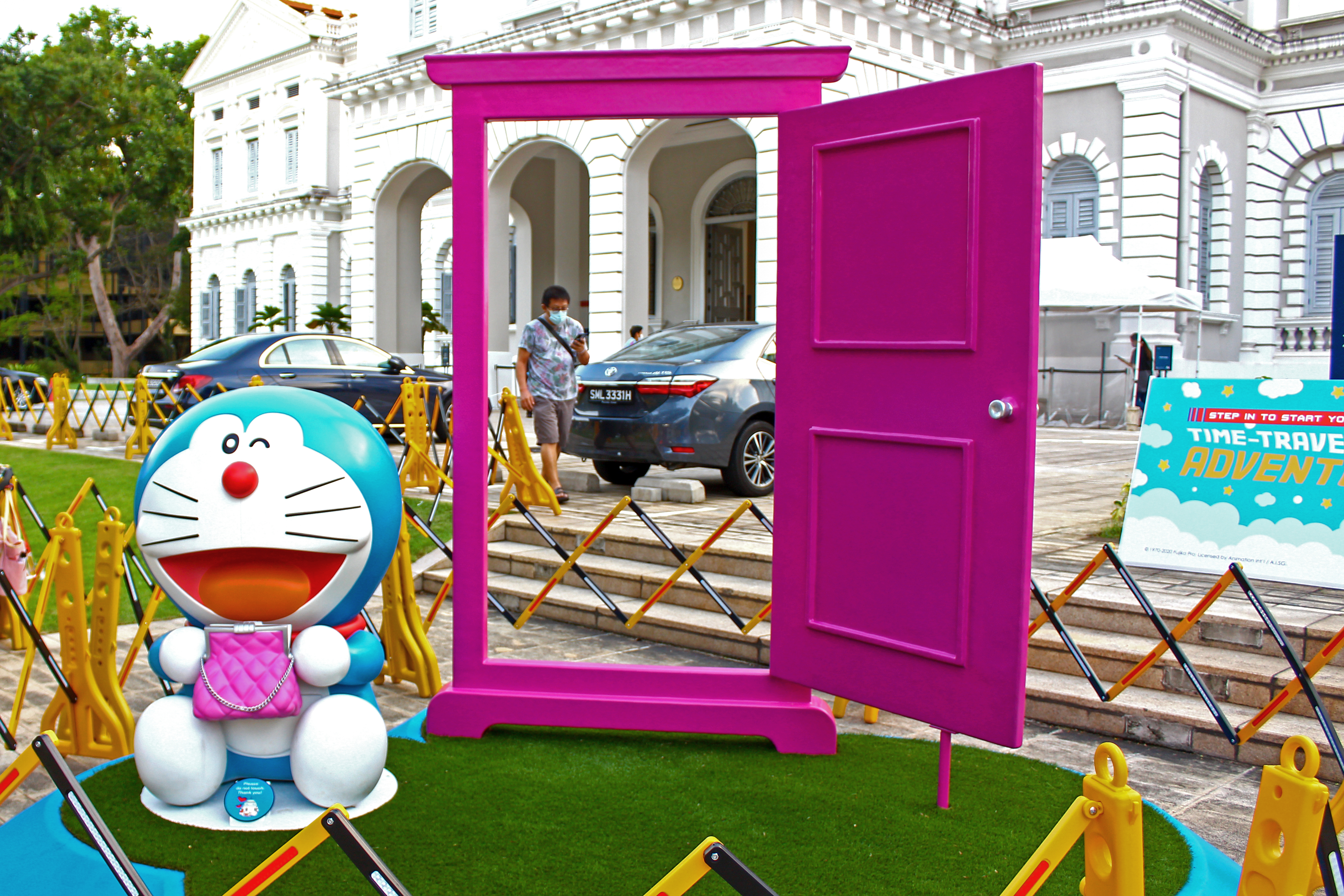
Doraemon and Anywhere Door statues at the National Museum of Singapore in October 2020

The Doraemon manga has inspired many other manga artists; these include Eiichiro Oda, the creator of One Piece with the idea of "Devil Fruits", and Masashi Kishimoto, the creator of Naruto, who drew characters from anime shows during his childhood, including Doraemon. The manga has also been referenced in Gintama and Great Teacher Onizuka. The character Doraemon is considered one of the most recognizable cultural icons in Japan, and one of the most well-known characters in manga history; some critics compared his popularity with that of Mickey Mouse and Snoopy. Mark Schilling noted that Doraemon's "Take-Copter" is familiar among Japanese people "just as Snoopy's biplane is familiar to most Americans".

On April 22, 2002, in the special issue of Asian Hero in Time magazine, Doraemon was the only anime character to be named one of the twenty-two Asian Heroes, and was described as "The Cuddliest Hero in Asia". A 2007 poll by Oricon shown that Doraemon was the second-strongest manga character ever, behind only Son Goku of Dragon Ball. Doraemon is also referred as something with the ability to satisfy all wishes.

In 2005, the Taiwan Society of New York selected Doraemon as a culturally significant work of Japanese otaku pop-culture in its exhibit Little Boy: The Arts of Japan's Exploding Subculture, curated by renowned artist Takashi Murakami. In 2008, the Japanese Ministry of Foreign Affairs appointed Doraemon as the first anime cultural ambassador; a Ministry spokesperson explained the decision as an attempt to help people in other countries better understand anime and to deepen their interest in Japanese culture. On September 3, 2012, Doraemon was granted official residence in the city of Kawasaki, Kanagawa, one hundred years before he was born. In the same year, Hong Kong celebrated the birthday of Doraemon 100 years early with a series of displays of the character. In April 2013, Doraemon was chosen as Japan's ambassador in Tokyo's bid to host the 2020 Summer Olympics and 2020 Summer Paralympics. He appeared in the 2016 Summer Olympics closing ceremony to promote the 2020 Summer Olympics in Tokyo.

A Fujiko F. Fujio museum opened in Kawasaki on September 3, 2011, featuring Doraemon as the star of the museum. The National Museum of Singapore held a time-travelling exhibition in October 2020 as a tribute to the manga. After the 2011 Tōhoku earthquake and tsunami, Shogakukan released an earthquake survival guidebook, which included the main cast of the Doraemon manga series. TV Asahi launched the Doraemon Fund charity fund to raise money for natural disasters in 2004 and 2011. In 2020, the Mumbai's Sion Friends Circle group distributed food and books to children using mascots, one being Doraemon, to those in need during the COVID-19 pandemic. In Vietnam, a Doraemon scholarship fund was established in 1996, and the Doraemon character has been used for education of traffic safety. Doraemon's creator, Fujiko F. Fujio, received the Culture Fighter Medal from the Vietnamese Ministry of Culture in 1996 for his contributions to youth education through the manga.

A parody of Doraemon created by Hikari Fujisaki, titled Nozoemon (のぞえもん), was first serialized in Nihon Bungeisha's Comic Heaven magazine in September 2014, with the compiled book volume released on June 9, 2015; however, it was discontinued in August 2015 due to content issues.

Many prominent figures have been nicknamed after the cast of Doraemon: politician Osamu Fujimura is known as the "Doraemon of Nagatacho" due to his figure and warm personality, and sumo wrestler Takamisugi was nicknamed "Doraemon" because of his resemblance to the character. In 2015, a group of people in a drought-affected village in northern Thailand used a Doraemon toy to complete a rain-ritual, in order to avoid controversies that would occur by using real animals.

In January 2023, it was reported that a six-year-old boy in Lucknow, India, survived a building collapse by recalling an episode about earthquake precautions where Nobita takes shelter under a bed.
