= Facebook real-name policy controversy =

Controversy over social networking site Facebook's real-name system

Facebook's notification to "update your name"

The Facebook real-name policy controversy is a controversy over social networking site Facebook's real-name system, which requires that a person use their legal name when they register an account and configure their user profile. The controversy stems from claims by some users that they are being penalized by Facebook for using their real names, and have suffered adverse consequences as a result. For example, Facebook's naming policies prohibit names that Facebook judges to have too many words, too many capital letters, or first names that consist of initials. Facebook's monitoring software detects and suspends such accounts. These policies prevent some users from having a Facebook account and profile with their real name.

As part of their complaint, those who cannot use their real names point out that millions of Facebook accounts use fake yet plausible-sounding names, and even fake and obviously implausible names, because Facebook's software fails to recognize them.

== Background ==
The social networking website Facebook has maintained the real-name system policy for user profiles. According to Facebook, the real-name policy stems from the position "that way, you always know who you're connecting with. This helps keep our community safe." Likewise per this policy, a "real name" is defined by "your real name as it would be listed on your credit card, driver's license or student ID". In August 2012, Facebook estimated that more than 83 million Facebook accounts are fake accounts. As a result of this revelation, the share price of Facebook dropped below $20. Facebook has asserted that "authentic identity is important to the Facebook experience, and our goal is that every account on Facebook should represent a real person".

== Affected users ==
=== Ethnic groups ===
==== Native Americans ====
Native Americans have been repeatedly targeted due to Facebook's policy.

- Robin Kills The Enemy, a resident of the Sioux Rosebud reservation in South Dakota, found that when she tried to register her surname in its normal format, the site would not let her use them, so she resorted to combining the three words, spelling them as one word. After having been a member for some time, she eventually contacted the site in an attempt to have her surname spelled as it actually is in real life. However, after reaching out to Facebook, they instead deactivated her account without explanation. When she was finally able to make contact with an actual employee, they wrote back telling her "Fake names are a violation of our Terms of Use. Facebook requires users to provide their full first and last names". She eventually managed to have her account reinstated; however, users with the surname Kills The Enemy are, as of 2015, still required by Facebook to spell their surname without spaces as a single word.
- Shane Creepingbear, an Oklahoman member of the Kiowa tribe, reported that he had been "kicked off" of Facebook on Columbus Day for having a supposedly fake name.
- Lance Brown Eyes, an Oglala, found that his account had been suspended; when he was able to send in documentation to Facebook proving his identity, Facebook reinstated his account, but changed his name to "Lance Brown".
- Dana Lone Hill, a member of the Lakota tribe who had been a registered Facebook user for several years, discovered one day that she had been locked out of her account. A message from Facebook said "it looks like the name on your Facebook account may not be your authentic name". After a week, during which she had to send in her personal documentation to Facebook, her account access was restored. She has since threatened a class-action lawsuit on behalf of Native Americans against Facebook due to how it exercises its name policies.

A number of Native Americans have objected to Facebook's inquiries into their names, and to Facebook's request that they provide proof of identification or other documentation in order to use the service. Native American activists claimed to be planning to file a class action lawsuit against Facebook regarding the 'real name' policy.

==== Japanese ====
In 2008, a woman in Japan named Hiroko Yoda had her Facebook account suspended over her surname, which is common in Japan, being confused with a Star Wars character of the same name.

==== Irish ====
The Dublin branch of the Irish language rights group, Misneach, started a Change.org online petition to demand the right to use Irish names on Facebook and protested outside Facebook's European headquarters in Dublin on October 7, 2015.

==== Scottish Gaelic ====
In 2015, Gabhan Mac A Ghobhainn, a retired policeman, won the right to use his Gaelic name on Facebook, although it was not his legal name. Some Scottish Gaelic surnames, such as NicIllAnndrais, contain more than two capital letters. As of 2015, Facebook still disallows them.

==== Chamoru ====
In the Spanish-influenced indigenous Chamoru culture of the Marianas, the standard naming convention has historically been for a person to use their mother's maiden name as their middle name. Furthermore, using one's full name rather than simply the first and last is commonplace, if only for disambiguation purposes due to a relatively small pool of surnames. Therefore, middle names such as De Leon Guerrero and De La Cruz are frequently encountered. However, attempting to register such names as one's middle name results in a message telling users that "Names can't have too many words." Therefore, many Chamoru users are forced to either run all of the words together as if they were one single word, or to initialize each word to a common acronym such as DLG or DLC.

In cases, where the acronym is employed, Facebook automatically changes to lower-case all letters except the first. (Use of periods, e.g., D.L.G., will result in a message telling users that "Profile names can't have too many periods.") Therefore, someone commonly known in real life by a name such as Mary De Leon Guerrero Mafnas would have to resort to using what on Facebook would end up being "Mary Dlg Mafnas". The message is not accompanied by an option to appeal the restriction or to send Facebook documentation that the format is how one normally formats their name in real life.

==== Vietnamese ====
In January 2015, a 23-year-old Australian bank employee claiming to be named Phuc Dat Bich posted a photo of his passport identification page to Facebook, protesting that the company had unfairly shut down his account for being "false and misleading". "Is it because I'm Asian? Is it?" he asked. The BBC reported that in Vietnamese the name is pronounced similarly to "Phoo Da Bi" (Vietnamese pronunciation: [/fukp˦˥ ɗat˩ ɓic˦˥/]). After his reinstatement, Bich posted a thank you note to supportive Facebook fans, stating he was "glad and honoured to be able to make people happy by simply making them laugh at something that appears outrageous and ridiculous". Subsequently "Phuc Dat" published a further message admitting it was a hoax.

==== Tamils ====
Tamils do not have surnames: They have their father or mother or both father and mother's first name as initials. This standard naming practice has not been acknowledged by Facebook.

=== Transgender users ===
Facebook's real-name policy does not reflect adopted names or pseudonyms used by the transgender community, and has led to suspending users with real names that might be thought to be fake. A user via the anonymous Android and iOS app Secret began reporting "fake names" which caused user profiles to be suspended, specifically targeting the stage names of drag queens.

Transgender people have also been affected by the policy, including one former Facebook employee who was one of several who worked on Facebook's custom gender options. According to gender non-conforming activist D. Dragonetti, Facebook even disregarded their government identification when supplied.

On October 1, 2014, Chris Cox, Chief Product Officer at Facebook, offered an apology to the LGBT community and drag kings and queens:

In the two weeks since the real-name policy issues surfaced, we've had the chance to hear from many of you in these communities and understand the policy more clearly as you experience it. We've also come to understand how painful this has been. We owe you a better service and a better experience using Facebook, and we're going to fix the way this policy gets handled so everyone affected here can go back to using Facebook as you were.

=== Users in need of protecting their identity ===
Secular, atheist, agnostic, humanist, or users who comment or blog expressing views critical of particular religions, sects or religion in general, as well as religious people who express the opposing views critical of atheism or agnosticism may feel they have a legitimate need to use an alias. Some of these users fear they could suffer rejection, retaliation, or violence if their views – contrary to those of their family, friends, or community – are known. In some countries, secular bloggers were imprisoned, attacked in the street or even killed by religious fanatics. Examples are the incarceration of activist and blogger Raif Badawi in Saudi Arabia and a string of attacks and murders of secular activists in Bangladesh and Pakistan.

== Reaction ==
International non-profit digital rights group Electronic Frontier Foundation stated they were "alarmed to hear that Facebook's 'real name' policy is disproportionately affecting the LGBTQ community".

Online magazine Queerty called Facebook's policy "a frankly creepy overreach of authority", adding "There are a million reasons why someone would choose to self-identify with a name other than the one that's printed on their birth certificate. And really, it's absolutely none of your business in the first place."

In an interview for MAGE Magazine, Second Life entrepreneur Jennifer Ceara Firehawk stated: "If we are not using our page to abuse or grief others they just need to leave us be. We are not hurting anyone… FB does not realize some SL people earn lindens to turn into RL (real life) money and that is how they make a living. Once you force a person to change the SL name they will lose money due to not being able to find them on FB or SL as they may use FB for their business or advertise. So they end up losing business and money."

Seattle drag performer Olivia LaGarce started a Change.org online petition titled "Allow performers to use their stage names on their Facebook accounts!"

== Compromise to protect those with special circumstances ==
On December 15, 2015, Facebook announced in a press release that it would be providing a compromise to its real name policy after protests from groups such as the gay/lesbian community and abuse victims. The site is developing a protocol that will allow members to provide specifics as to their "special circumstance" or "unique situation" with a request to use pseudonyms, subject to verification of their true identities. At that time, this was already being tested in the U.S. Product manager Todd Gage and vice president of global operations Justin Osofsky also promised a new method for reducing the number of members who must go through ID verification while ensuring the safety of others on Facebook. The fake name reporting procedure will also be modified, forcing anyone who makes such an allegation to provide specifics that would be investigated and giving the accused individual time to dispute the allegation. When a Facebook user gets a Support Inbox message stating that they must provide identification, there is now a checkbox that lets them check off several circumstances (including ethnic member, transgender, physically threatened/stalked). However, many users have reported that this is just for show, and such special circumstances are repeatedly ignored, rendering Facebook's policy statement nothing more than public relations.

This measure was criticized by the Electronic Frontier Foundation, who pointed out that it forces the most vulnerable users to reveal intimate details of their personal lives.

== Notable accounts suspended ==
- Bebe Sweetbriar
- Heklina
- Sister Roma
- R. U. Sirius

== See also ==
- Criticism of Facebook
- Nymwars
