= AltJapan =

Japanese entertainment company

AltJapan Co, Ltd.
- Type: Limited company
- Industry: Video games
- Founded: 2000
- Headquarters: Tokyo, Japan
- Key people: Hiroko Yoda, CEO; Matt Alt, Vice President
- Services: Video game localization
- Website: AltJapan

AltJapan Co., Ltd. is a Tokyo based company specializing in the translation and localization of Japanese entertainment. It is particularly active in manga and video game localization. It specializes in Japanese-to-English and English-to-Japanese translation, but also handles European language localization as well. It has worked on titles for companies including Capcom, Koei-Tecmo, Namco-Bandai, Konami, Taito, Square-Enix, and Platinum Games. Credits include Dragon Quest VIII, the Ninja Gaiden series, the Dynasty Warriors Gundam series, Lollipop Chainsaw, Lost Planet 3, and the 2014 remake of Strider.

The company also produces the recording sessions for video games as well, most notably on the Dynasty Warriors Gundam and Dead or Alive series.

In addition to localization, AltJapan is also credited with scriptwriting on titles including Ninja Gaiden Sigma 2, Ninja Gaiden Dragon Sword, and World of Demons.

AltJapan's manga translation credits include Nura: Rise of the Yokai Clan, Togari, and Dorohedoro. At the 2013 San Diego Comic-con, Fuijko F. Fujio Productions announced that AltJapan would produce the English version of the manga Doraemon in conjunction with Voyager Japan. Inc.

Original content produced by AltJapan includes the books Hello, Please! Very Helpful Super Kawaii Characters from Japan (Chronicle Books, 2007) and the Attack! series, which includes Yokai Attack! The Japanese Monster Survival Guide (Kodansha, 2008), Ninja Attack! True Tales of Assassins, Samurai, and Outlaws (Kodansha, 2010), and Yurei Attack! The Japanese Ghost Survival Guide (Tuttle, 2012).

== Founders ==
Hiroko Yoda and Matt Alt worked together for several years prior to the foundation of their company; their first credit as independent translators was Lunar: Silver Star Story Complete for Working Designs.

Yoda holds a master's degree in international peace and conflict resolution from the American University in Washington, DC. She was also a Tokyo city editor for the CNN travel website CNNGo.

Alt is a former translator for the United States Patent and Trademark Office. In 2013 he served as a judge for the Manga Translation Battle. In 2014 he joined the cast of the NHK World television show Japanology Plus. He served as emcee of the American Manga Awards in 2024 and 2025.

The pair makes frequent appearances as Japanese pop culture experts in a variety of international media. They made cameo appearances in the film Death Kappa and participated as extras in The Great Yokai War.

== Translation Style ==
AltJapan is known for pairing native Japanese and native English speakers on its localization projects, a legacy of its founders' own experience working together and a rarity in the early days of the localization industry.
