= List of Doraemon Plus chapters =

Doraemon+ (ドラえもんプラス) is a collection of "short story" chapters of Fujiko F. Fujio's Doraemon (as opposed to the so-called "long story" standalone volumes of Daichōhen Doraemon) that did not make the 45 published volumes. It was released as seven volumes between March 25, 2005, to December 1, 2023.

Genre: Adventure, Comedy, Fantasy, Sci-fi

== List of chapters ==
=== Volume 1 (March 25, 2005) ===
- Chapter 01 – A Partial Gourmet Table
- Chapter 02 – A Tickling Glove
- Chapter 03 – For Me to Stop Nobita
- Chapter 04 – Substitute Stickers
- Chapter 05 – Traveling Half Cloud
- Chapter 06 – A Friendship Chocolate
- Chapter 07 – Secret Keeper Dog
- Chapter 08 – A Chasing T
- Chapter 09 – A Concentration Soap Helmet
- Chapter 10 – A Preference Photo Printer
- Chapter 11 – An Elephant Trunk Lipstick
- Chapter 12 – Flower Recorder
- Chapter 13 – A Mirage Candle
- Chapter 14 – A Lucky Bee
- Chapter 15 – Future Telling Radio
- Chapter 16 – A Wrapping Cloth to Carry Someone
- Chapter 17 – A Thrill Tickets
- Chapter 18 – Miss Fortunate from Nobita's Point of View
- Chapter 19 – I Want a Strong Pet
- Chapter 20 – A Story of Bell Crickets
- Chapter 21 – Set the Room Guard
- Chapter 22 – Study for the Test You Hate

=== Volume 2 (July 20, 2005) ===
- Chapter 01 – A Fan to Change One's Mind
- Chapter 02 – Who's the Real Thief
- Chapter 03 – A Ghost Story
- Chapter 04 – A Substitute Television
- Chapter 05 – An Absconding Scroll
- Chapter 06 – Nobita's Iron Body
- Chapter 07 – Spying Vines
- Chapter 08 – An Unpleasant Feeling Measuring Device
- Chapter 09 – Plan to Escape from the Earth
- Chapter 10 – A Command Gun
- Chapter 11 – A Dream's Director Chair
- Chapter 12 – A Complete Restoration Liquid
- Chapter 13 – Super Giant
- Chapter 14 – A Concetration [sic] Mechine
- Chapter 15 – A Summon Buzzer
- Chapter 16 – A Future Nobita
- Chapter 17 – A Salary Riot
- Chapter 18 – Human Programming Pill
- Chapter 19 – Pinch Runner
- Chapter 20 – Pet Pen
- Chapter 21 – Time Pistol to Eliminate Obstacle

=== Volume 3 (March 9, 2005) ===
- Chapter 01 – Sound Camera
- Chapter 02 – Courage Test Glasses
- Chapter 03 – Would You Be Okay If Doraemon Wasn't Here?!
- Chapter 04 – An Uproar Caused by a Popular Badge
- Chapter 05 – Where Were You at That Time?
- Chapter 06 – A Monster Box
- Chapter 07 – Turnover Dynamite
- Chapter 08 – A Grateful Ring
- Chapter 09 – An Indoor World Travel Set
- Chapter 10 – Patrol Car of Justice
- Chapter 11 – A Flying Paper
- Chapter 12 – A Duplication Balloon
- Chapter 13 – A Deposit Card
- Chapter 14 – A Sneezing Powder
- Chapter 15 – Hologram Machine
- Chapter 16 – Super Speed Goggles
- Chapter 17 – A Fear Maker Machine
- Chapter 18 – Petter
- Chapter 19 – Shyara Gum
- Chapter 20 – Muscle Control
- Chapter 21 – A Cockroach Doll

=== Volume 4 (December 1, 2005) ===
- Chapter 01 – A Million Volt Man
- Chapter 02 – Taking Scoop Picture with Chance Camera
- Chapter 03 – A Fake Scribble Pen
- Chapter 04 – Mini Santa
- Chapter 05 – The Treasure Hunting Paper
- Chapter 06 – A Child of Wind Band
- Chapter 07 – A Robot Pet Dog
- Chapter 08 – A Part Time Job for a Yeti
- Chapter 09 – Teletelephone
- Chapter 10 – Image Gum
- Chapter 11 – A Misfortunate Forecast Machine
- Chapter 12 – An Animal Training Shop
- Chapter 13 – A Paper Plane
- Chapter 14 – Traffic Mark Stickers
- Chapter 15 – Energy Saving Hot Air Balloon
- Chapter 16 – A Revenge Band
- Chapter 17 – A Comrade Badge
- Chapter 18 – A Human Task Time Switch
- Chapter 19 – All Purpose Glasses
- Chapter 20 – Doraemon and Dorami-chan

=== Volume 5 (February 28, 2006) ===
- Chapter 01 – Sparta Victory Pills and Hater Touch Baton
- Chapter 02 – A Dream Coder
- Chapter 03 – A Secret Story
- Chapter 04 – Air Conditioner Photo
- Chapter 05 – The Famous Singer, Tsubasa-chan, Has a Secret
- Chapter 06 – A Falling Star Catcher
- Chapter 07 – Obedience Hat
- Chapter 08 – A Great Shell Set
- Chapter 09 – A Snow in March
- Chapter 10 – A Magic Map
- Chapter 11 – A Care-Giver Robot
- Chapter 12 – A Fake Telephone Adapter
- Chapter 13 – Ignorant Bug
- Chapter 14 – Traffic Protection Time
- Chapter 15 – Firecracker Paper
- Chapter 16 – Use Combine Glue for Hiking
- Chapter 17 – Pencil Missile and Counter Attack Radar
- Chapter 18 – An Ultra Super Deluxe Pill
- Chapter 19 – A Confession Hat
- Chapter 20 – 45 Years Later

=== Volume 6 (December 1, 2014) ===
- Chapter 01 — The Lost Treasure of Minikini
- Chapter 02 — Nobita 2.0
- Chapter 03 — Cosmic Kockets
- Chapter 04 — The Really, Really Bad Temper
- Chapter 05 — The Troubles with Nobita
- Chapter 06 — Operation: B.U.L.L.Y
- Chapter 07 — Nobita-It Is
- Chapter 08 — The Enchanted Land of Nobitanna
- Chapter 09 — Nobita and Gian in Black-and-White
- Chapter 10 — The Spy Who Seed Me
- Chapter 11 — It's a Spoonful Life!
- Chapter 12 — The Sick Joke
- Chapter 14 — No Friend Accustomed, No Present
- Chapter 15 — The Sword in the Throne
- Chapter 16 — The Christmas Trap
- Chapter 17 — Nobita on the Prairie
- Chapter 18 — Nobita the Kid

=== Volume 7 (December 1, 2023) ===
- Chapter 01 — The Pop-Through Pillow
- Chapter 02 — The Mirrorizer
- Chapter 03 — The High Rise Escape
- Chapter 04 — Mini Typhoons
- Chapter 05 — Doraemon Sings!
- Chapter 06 — Arm & Leg Heads
- Chapter 07 — Nobita Broadcasting Corporation
- Chapter 08 — Possessing Gian
- Chapter 09 — The Tanuki Wallet
- Chapter 10 — The Badge of Gratitude
- Chapter 11 — Buried Treasure
- Chapter 12 — The Truth Transmitter
- Chapter 14 — The Creature Taming Glove
- Chapter 15 — Anime Spray
- Chapter 16 — Handmade Toys
- Chapter 17 — The Payback Hands
- Chapter 18 — Searching for a Tsuchinoko
- Chapter 19 – The All-Purpose Tent
- Chapter 20 – Let's Go to Japan 70,000 Years Ago
- Chapter 21 – Ask the Fate Forecaster
