= Fujimidai, Nerima =

Fujimidai 富士見台
- Neighborhood (町丁)
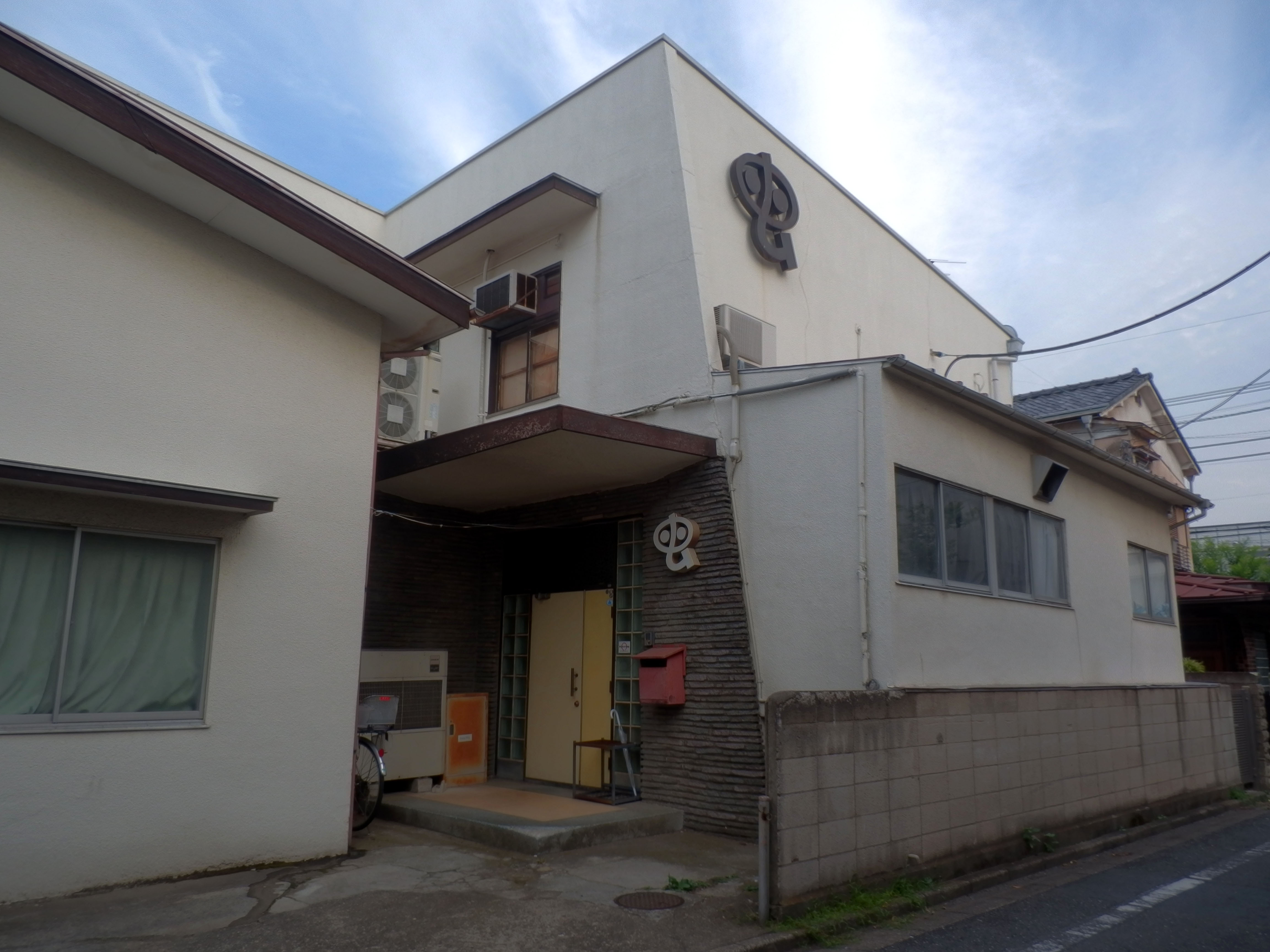
- Mushi Production in Fujimidai 2nd Street.

- Location of Fujimidai within the Wards Area of Tokyo
- Coordinates: 35°44′16″N 139°37′24″E
- Country: Japan
- Metropolis: Tokyo
- Ward: Nerima

Area
  - Total: 0.959 km^{2} (0.370 sq mi)

Population (December 1, 2017)
  - Total: 15,614
- Time zone: UTC+9 (JST)
- Zip code: 177-0034
- Area code: 03

Fujimidai (富士見台) is a neighborhood in Nerima Ward, Tokyo, Japan. The residential address system has been implemented since November 1, 1964, and the current administrative names go from Fujimidai 1st Street to 4th Street (丁目, chōme).

== Geography ==
It is located in the southern part of Nerima Ward. The neighborhood borders Takanodai to the north, Kami-Saginomiya in Nakano Ward and Igusa in Suginami Ward to the south, Takanodai (the northeastern part) and Minami-Tanaka to the west, and Nukui to the east. Fujimidai Station on the Seibu Ikebukuro Line is located near the border with Fujimidai in Nukui 3rd Street. In addition, the area around Fujimidai Station on the Seibu Ikebukuro Line in Nukui 3rd Street (around Nukui 1st Street and 3rd Street, Kami-Saginomiya 3rd Street and 4thStreet in Nakano Ward) is sometimes recognized as part of the Fujimidai neighborhood by information guides, as it is close to Fujimidai Station and has a continuous shopping street.

== History ==
Formerly Yawarazaike, Shakujii Village, Toshima County, Musashi Province, later Yawara Village.

In 1889, Yawara Village became Ōaza Yawara (谷原) in Shakujii Village with the implementation of the town and village system. In 1932, with the incorporation into Tokyo City, it became Shakujii-Yawarachō 1st Street and 2nd Street in Itabashi Ward. In 1947, with the division of Nerima Ward from Itabashi Ward, Shakujii-Yawarachō 1st and 2nd Street became part of Nerima Ward, and on January 1, 1949, the prefix was dropped and it became Yawarachō 1st and 2nd Street.

When the residential address system was implemented in the area on November 1, 1964, the boundaries were changed by incorporating parts of Yaharachō 2nd Street and Minami-Tanakachō into almost the entire area of Yaharachō 1st Street, resulting in the current Fujimidai 1st to 4th Street. The remaining part of Yaharachō 2nd Street became the Yahara neighborhood on the north side of Mejiro-dōri and Takanodai on the south side.
