= World of Demons =

2021 video game

- Developer(s): PlatinumGames
- Publisher(s): PlatinumGames
- Director(s): Ryoya Sakabe
- Producer(s): Koji Tanaka
- Designer(s): Takanori Sato; Ryotaro Honda
- Writer(s): Matt Alt; Hiroko Yoda
- Composer(s): Hiroshi Yamaguchi; Naofumi Harada
- Platform(s): iOS, macOS
- Release: April 2, 2021
- Genre(s): Hack and slash
- Mode(s): Single-player

World of Demons was a 2021 hack and slash video game developed by PlatinumGames. The player plays as a samurai who controls yōkai to fight against oni. The game was released on April 2, 2021 through Apple Arcade. On January 5, 2024, PlatinumGames announced the game would end service and be removed on January 18, 2024.

== Gameplay ==
World of Demons is broken up into individual chapters, in which the player completes combat challenges and puzzles to progress. The player can collect yōkai through gameplay, which each have different attacks. The game has four playable samurai, who have unique weapons. Both yōkai and weapons can be upgraded through two currencies earned through gameplay, gold and gems.

Each character can use spirits called yōkai who fight alongside the player in combat. The samurai can perform different attacks based on how fast they tap on the touchscreen, and how long they hold between taps. Players can use different moves together to perform combos. World of Demons has a bullet time mechanic, where if the player dodges right before an enemy attack, time slows down and allows the player to get additional hits in.

== Development ==
World of Demons was announced in April 2018 as a partnership between PlatinumGames and DeNA, and was set to release later the same year as a free-to-play experience. The game soft-launched on iOS in June 2018 in Malaysia, Singapore and the Philippines. The game was not updated after its launch, and was removed from the App Store in September 2018, leading some to think the game was canceled.

The final game was entirely redesigned from the soft-launch. Apart from the graphics and concept, nothing in World of Demons is the same as the 2018 release. PlatinumGames studio head Atsushi Inaba stated that "it is a completely different game. We had the opportunity to release the game for Apple Arcade, and instead of just making a few small adjustments for the new platform, we decided to take this opportunity to rebuild the game from the ground up." Inaba stated one of the inspirations for the game was Hyakki Yagyō, a Japanese folktale.

The game was released on April 2, 2021 through Apple Arcade on iOS and macOS. On January 5, 2024, PlatinumGames announced the game would be removed from Apple Arcade on January 18 and shut down on February 1.

== Reception ==
Reception

Aggregate score
Aggregator	Score
Metacritic	76/100

Review scores
Publication	Score
Destructoid	7/10
Edge	6/10
GameSpot	7/10
Jeuxvideo.com	15/20
MeriStation	8/10

World of Demons received "generally favorable" reviews, according to review aggregator Metacritic.

GameSpot's Jason Fanelli praised the versatility of the combat system for encouraging strategizing with enemies, summarizing "it's fast and it's frantic, but most importantly, it's a lot of fun". He found fault with the lack of variety in the mission structure for "follow[ing] this exact same structure", finding the only variety was the different yōkai in fights.

CJ Andriessen of Destructoid praised World of Demons' use of the touchscreen controls, and that while he thought the game was best played with a controller, "everyone should be able to hold their own without one." He criticized the game's "slow" camera controls and "unreliable" auto-target system, though noted he was usually able to avoid the latter through dodging. Overall, he felt that the game should be treated like a free-to-play title, calling it "more bite-sized fun rather than sink-your-whole-weekend-into-it fun."
