= Death Kappa =

- DVD cover
- Directed by: Tomoo Haraguchi
- Screenplay by: Masakazu Migita
- Story by: Tomoo Haraguchi
- Produced by: Yoko Hayama; Yoshinori Chiba; Tomo Fukatsu; Hidemasa Iwashita
- Starring: Misato Hirata; Mika Sakuraba; Ryuki Kitaoka
- Cinematography: Yoshihito Takahashi
- Edited by: Yoshitaka Honda
- Music by: Masako Ishii
- Production company: Nikkatsu
- Distributed by: Tokyo Shock
- Release date: June 5, 2010 (Tokyo)
- Running time: 85 minutes
- Country: Japan
- Language: Japanese

Death Kappa (Japanese: デスカッパ, Hepburn: Desukappa) is a 2010 kaiju film directed by Tomoo Haraguchi. An international co-production of Japan and the United States, it stars Misato Hirata, Mika Sakuraba, and Ryuki Kitaoka. In the film, a series of military experiments result in the appearance of a giant irradiated monster rivaled by a colossal mutant kappa (an amphibious, turtle-like yōkai). It is the second kaiju film by the company to be inspired by kappa after Gappa: The Triphibian Monster (1967).

== Cast ==
- Misato Hirata as Kanako Kawado
- Mika Sakuraba as Yuriko
- Daniel Aguilar Gutiérrez as Professor Tanaka
- Ryuki Kitaoka as National Guard
- Hiroko Sakurai as Fujiko Kawado
- Mitsuko Hoshi as JSDF Officer
- Shigeru Araki as Secretary-General
- Yakan Nabe as Station Attendant
- Toshio Miyake as Hangyloas
- Kazunori Yokoo as Death Kappa

The film features cameo appearances by Hideaki Anno and Shinji Higuchi.

== Production ==
The production saw the appointment of Tomoo Haraguchi—a special effects makeup artist known for Japanese tokusatsu films—as director, marking a shift in direction from the previous two films, which were characterized by extreme, innovative gore. Death Kappa embraces the tradition of Japanese "tokusatsu" kaiju cinema (exemplified by the Godzilla and Gamera series). It serves as an homage to the Nikkatsu-produced film Gappa: The Triphibian Monster, originally released on April 22, 1967. Misato Hirata, known for her role as Crew Member Konomi in Ultraman Mebius, stars in the lead role. Additionally, Hideaki Anno and Shinji Higuchi—who would later work on Shin Godzilla—make cameo appearances. The sound effect for Death Kappa's heat ray was reused from Godzilla's firing sound. The scene where the announcer—played by Shinji Higuchi—is attacked by Hangyoras pays homage to the 1954 film Godzilla. Trailers for both the Japanese and US releases include the tagline: "King Kong is dead. Godzilla has retired. Gamera... who?"

== Reception ==
Death Kappa received generally negative reviews. Steven Sloss of Our Culture Mag praised the film's use of traditional tokusatsu special effects techniques, but criticized its humor, calling it "among the very worst of the kaiju genre." Rob Hunter, writing for Film School Rejects, complimented the film's miniature city set and monster fight sequences but lamented that "Death Kappa's giant monster madness doesn't begin until halfway through the film though, and until then we're stuck with a mixed bag of scenes, gags, and characters that never quite come together as a whole." Spencer Perry of ComicBook.com called the film "preposterous and amateurish throughout," but concluded that "Even when the absurd effects are laughable it doesn't sway from the film's relentless enthusiasm for what it's trying to do."
