= List of Digimon episodes and films =

This is a list of television series and films produced as part of the Digimon franchise created by Bandai. The franchise revolves around monsters of various forms living in a "Digital World", a parallel universe that originated from Earth's various communication networks.

== Series overview ==
No.	Title	Episodes	Originally aired		Network
No.	Title	Episodes	First aired	Last aired	Network
1	Digimon Adventure (1999)	54	March 7, 1999	March 26, 2000	Fuji TV
2	Digimon Adventure 02	50	April 2, 2000	March 25, 2001	Fuji TV
3	Digimon Tamers	51	April 1, 2001	March 31, 2002	Fuji TV
4	Digimon Frontier	50	April 7, 2002	March 30, 2003	Fuji TV
5	Digimon Data Squad	48	April 2, 2006	March 25, 2007	Fuji TV
6	Digimon Fusion	79	July 6, 2010	March 25, 2012	TV Asahi
7	Digimon Universe: App Monsters	52	October 1, 2016	September 30, 2017	TV Tokyo
8	Digimon Adventure (2020)	67	April 5, 2020	September 26, 2021	Fuji TV
9	Digimon Ghost Game	67+1 special	October 3, 2021	March 26, 2023	Fuji TV
10	Digimon Beatbreak	49	October 5, 2025	September 27, 2026	Fuji TV
Total		568 episodes			

== List of episodes ==
=== Season 1: Digimon Adventure (1999–2000) ===
No.	English version title / Translated title	Directed by	Written by	Original release date	English air date
1	"And So It Begins..." ("Adrift? The Island of Adventure!"); Transliteration: "Hyōryū? Bōken no Shima!" (Japanese: 漂流? 冒険の島!)	Hiroyuki Kakudō	Satoru Nishizono	March 7, 1999	August 14, 1999
2	"The Birth of Greymon" ("Explosive Evolution! Greymon"); Transliteration: "Bakuretsu Shinka! Gureimon" (Japanese: 爆裂進化! グレイモン)	Hiroyuki Kakudō	Satoru Nishizono	March 14, 1999	August 21, 1999
3	"Garurumon" ("The Blue Wolf! Garurumon"); Transliteration: "Aoki Ōkami! Garurumon" (Japanese: 蒼き狼! ガルルモン)	Takenori Kawada	Reiko Yoshida	March 21, 1999	August 28, 1999
4	"Biyomon Gets Firepower (Note: Episode 4 originally aired with the title "Fireman's Ball" and was renamed "Biyomon Gets Firepower" for subsequent reruns.)" ("Scorching Heat! Birdramon"); Transliteration: "Shakunetsu! Bādoramon" (Japanese: 灼熱! バードラモン)	Takahiro Imamura	Genki Yoshimura	March 28, 1999	September 4, 1999
5	"Kabuterimon's Electro Shocker" ("Lightning! Kabuterimon"); Transliteration: "Denkō! Kabuterimon" (Japanese: 電光! カブテリモン)	Hiroki Shibata	Hiro Masaki	April 4, 1999	September 11, 1999
6	"Togemon in Toy Town" ("Togemon Angrily!"); Transliteration: "Togemon Ikari" (Japanese: トゲモン怒り!)	Tetsuo Imazawa	Yoshio Urasawa	April 11, 1999	September 20, 1999
7	"Ikkakumon's Harpoon Torpedo" ("Roar! Ikkakumon"); Transliteration: "Hōkō! Ikkakumon" (Japanese: 咆哮! イッカクモン)	Harume Kosaka	Akatsuki Yamatoya	April 18, 1999	September 21, 1999
8	"Evil Shows His Face" ("Devimon: the Emissary of Darkness!"); Transliteration: "Yami no Shisha Debimon" (Japanese: 闇の使者デビモン!)	Hiroyuki Kakudō	Satoru Nishizono	April 25, 1999	September 22, 1999
9	"Subzero Ice Punch!" ("Clash! The Freezing Digimon"); Transliteration: "Gekitotsu! Reitō Dejimon" (Japanese: 激突! 冷凍デジモン)	Takenori Kawada	Atsushi Maekawa	May 2, 1999	September 23, 1999
10	"A Clue from the Digi-Past" ("Kentarumon the Protector!"); Transliteration: "Shugosha Kentarumon" (Japanese: 守護者ケンタルモン!)	Keiji Hayakawa	Genki Yoshimura	May 9, 1999	September 24, 1999
11	"The Dancing Digimon" ("The Dancing Ghosts! Bakemon"); Transliteration: "Odoru Bōrei! Bakemon" (Japanese: 踊る亡霊! バケモン)	Hiroki Shibata	Yoshio Urasawa	May 16, 1999	September 25, 1999
12	"DigiBaby Boom" ("Adventure! Patamon and Me"); Transliteration: "Bōken! Patamon to Boku" (Japanese: 冒険! パタモンと僕)	Takahiro Imamura	Hiro Masaki	May 23, 1999	September 30, 1999
13	"The Legend of the Digi-destined" ("Angemon Wakes!"); Transliteration: "Enjemon Kakusei!" (Japanese: エンジェモン覚醒!)	Hiroyuki Kakudō	Satoru Nishizono	May 30, 1999	October 1, 1999
14	"Departure for a New Continent" ("Departure for a New Continent!"); Transliteration: "Tabidachi Shintairiku e!" (Japanese: 出航・新大陸へ!)	Tetsuo Imazawa	Reiko Yoshida	June 6, 1999	October 2, 1999
15	"The Dark Network of Etemon" ("Etemon! The Stage Mounting of Evil"); Transliteration: "Etemon! Aku no Hanamichi" (Japanese: エテモン! 悪の花道)	Keiji Hayakawa	Satoru Nishizono	June 13, 1999	October 4, 1999
16	"The Arrival of Skullgreymon" ("Dark Evolution! SkullGreymon"); Transliteration: "Ankoku Shinka! SukaruGureimon" (Japanese: 暗黒進化! スカルグレイモン)	Takenori Kawada	Hiro Masaki	June 20, 1999	October 5, 1999
17	"The Crest of Sincerity" ("Cockatrimon, the Captain of Illusions!"); Transliteration: "Maboroshi Senchō Kokatorimon!" (Japanese: 幻船長コカトリモン!)	Hiroki Shibata	Yoshio Urasawa	June 27, 1999	October 6, 1999
18	"The Piximon Cometh" ("The Fairy! Picklemon"); Transliteration: "Yōsei! Pikkoromon" (Japanese: 妖精! ピッコロモン)	Takahiro Imamura	Atsushi Maekawa	July 4, 1999	October 7, 1999
19	"The Prisoner of the Pyramid" ("Nanomon of the Labyrinth!"); Transliteration: "Meikyū no Nanomon" (Japanese: 迷宮のナノモン)	Hiroyuki Kakudō	Satoru Nishizono	July 11, 1999	October 8, 1999
20	"The Earthquake of MetalGreymon" ("Evolution to Perfect! MetalGreymon"); Transliteration: "Kanzentai Shinka! MetaruGureimon" (Japanese: 完全体進化! メタルグレイモン)	Keiji Hayakawa	Satoru Nishizono	July 25, 1999	October 9, 1999
21	"Home Away from Home" ("Koromon, the Great Clash in Tokyo!"); Transliteration: "Koromon Tōkyō Dai-gekitotsu!" (Japanese: コロモン東京大激突!)	Mamoru Hosoda	Reiko Yoshida	August 1, 1999	October 16, 1999
22	"Forget About It!" ("The Small Devil, PicoDevimon"); Transliteration: "Sasayaku Ko-akuma PikoDebimon" (Japanese: ささやく小悪魔ピコデビモン)	Takenori Kawada	Hiro Masaki	August 8, 1999	October 23, 1999
23	"WereGarurumon's Diner" ("Oh Friend! WereGarurumon"); Transliteration: "Tomo yo! WāGarurumon" (Japanese: 友よ! ワーガルルモン)	Junji Shimizu	Genki Yoshimura	August 15, 1999	October 30, 1999
24	"No Questions, Please" ("Break Through! AtlurKabuterimon"); Transliteration: "Gekiha! AtorāKabuterimon" (Japanese: 撃破! アトラーカブテリモン)	Tetsuo Imazawa	Yoshio Urasawa	August 22, 1999	November 6, 1999
25	"Princess Karaoke" (Note: Episode 25 originally aired with the title misspelled with "Karoake", which was corrected with "Karaoke" for subsequent reruns.) ("The Sleeping Tyrant! TonosamaGekomon"); Transliteration: "Nemureru Bōkun! TonosamaGekomon" (Japanese: 眠れる暴君! トノサマゲコモン)	Hiroki Shibata	Akatsuki Yamatoya	August 29, 1999	November 6, 1999
26	"Sora's Crest of Love" ("Shining Wings! Garudamon"); Transliteration: "Kagayaku Tsubasa! Garudamon" (Japanese: 輝く翼! ガルダモン)	Hiroyuki Kakudō	Atsushi Maekawa	September 5, 1999	November 13, 1999
27	"The Gateway to Home" ("Vamdemon, the Castle of Darkness"); Transliteration: "Yami no Shiro Vandemon" (Japanese: 闇の城ヴァンデモン)	Keiji Hayakawa	Hiro Masaki	September 12, 1999	November 20, 1999
28	"It's All in the Cards" ("The Chase! Hurry to Japan"); Transliteration: "Tsuigeki! Nippon e Isoge" (Japanese: 追撃! 日本へ急げ)	Takahiro Imamura	Hiro Masaki	September 19, 1999	November 27, 1999
29	"Return to Highton View Terrace" ("Mammon: The Great Clash at Hikarigaoka!"); Transliteration: "Mammon Hikarigaoka Daigekitotsu!" (Japanese: マンモン光が丘大激突!)	Takenori Kawada	Satoru Nishizono	September 26, 1999	December 11, 1999
30	"Almost Home Free" ("Digimon: The Great Crossing of Tokyo"); Transliteration: "Dejimon Tōkyō Daiōdan" (Japanese: デジモン東京大横断)	Junji Shimizu	Atsushi Maekawa	October 3, 1999	December 11, 1999
31	"The Eighth Digivice" ("Raremon! Surprise Attack on Tokyo Bay"); Transliteration: "Reamon! Tōkyōwan Shūgeki" (Japanese: レアモン! 東京湾襲撃)	Hiroki Shibata	Hiro Masaki	October 10, 1999	December 18, 1999
32	"Gatomon Comes Calling" ("Tokyo Tower Is Hot! DeathMeramon"); Transliteration: "Atsui ze Tōkyō Tower! DesuMeramon" (Japanese: 熱いぜ東京タワー! デスメラモン)	Tetsuo Imazawa	Satoru Nishizono	October 17, 1999	December 18, 1999
33	"Out on the Town (Note: Starting with this episode, an updated version of the intro is used due to the inclusion of Gatomon.)" ("Pump and Gotsu Are Shibuya-Type Digimon"); Transliteration: "Panpu to Gotsu wa Shibuya-kei Dejimon" (Japanese: パンプとゴツは渋谷系デジモン)	Hiroyuki Kakudō	Yoshio Urasawa	October 24, 1999	January 29, 2000
34	"The Eighth Child Revealed" ("The Bond of Destiny! Tailmon"); Transliteration: "Unmei no Kizuna! Teirumon" (Japanese: 運命の絆! テイルモン)	Takenori Kawada	Genki Yoshimura	October 31, 1999	February 5, 2000
35	"Flower Power" ("Odaiba's Fairy! Lilymon Blossoms"); Transliteration: "Odaiba no Yōsei! Ririmon Kaika" (Japanese: お台場の妖精! リリモン開花)	Takahiro Imamura	Hiro Masaki	November 7, 1999	February 5, 2000
36	"City Under Siege" ("Break through the Barrier! Zudomon Spark!"); Transliteration: "Kekkai Toppa! Zudomon Spāku!" (Japanese: 結界突破! ズドモンスパーク!)	Tetsuharu Nakamura	Atsushi Maekawa	November 14, 1999	February 12, 2000
37	"Wizardmon's Gift" ("Perfects Attack Together! Sparkling Angewomon"); Transliteration: "Kanzentai Sō-shingeki! Kirameku Enjiwomon" (Japanese: 完全体総進撃! きらめくエンジェウーモン)	Hiroki Shibata	Genki Yoshimura	November 21, 1999	February 12, 2000
38	"Prophecy" ("Revival! The Demon Lord VenomVamdemon"); Transliteration: "Fukkatsu! Maō VenomuVandemon" (Japanese: 復活! 魔王ヴェノムヴァンデモン)	Hiroyuki Kakudō	Hiro Masaki	November 28, 1999	February 19, 2000
39	"The Battle for Earth" ("Two Ultimate Evolutions! Get Rid of the Darkness!"); Transliteration: "Nidai kyūkyoku Shinka! Yami o Buttobase!" (Japanese: 二大究極進化! 闇をぶっとばせ!)	Junji Shimizu	Atsushi Maekawa	December 5, 1999	February 19, 2000
40	"Enter the Dark Masters" ("The Four Kings of the Devilish Mountain! The Dark Masters!"); Transliteration: "Ma no Yama no Shitennō! Dāku Masutāzu" (Japanese: 魔の山の四天王! ダークマスターズ)	Tetsuo Imazawa	Satoru Nishizono	December 12, 1999	February 26, 2000
41	"Sea-Sick and Tired" ("The Hardened King of the Seas! MetalSeadramon"); Transliteration: "Araburu Umi no Ō! MetaruShīdoramon" (Japanese: 荒ぶる海の王! メタルシードラモン)	Takenori Kawada	Yoshio Urusawa	December 19, 1999	February 26, 2000
42	"Under Pressure" ("Silent Whamon on the Bottom of the Sea"); Transliteration: "Chinmoku no Kaitei Hoēmon" (Japanese: 沈黙の海底ホエーモン)	Takahiro Imamura	Akatsuki Yamatoya	December 26, 1999	March 4, 2000
43	"Playing Games" ("The Dangerous Game! Pinocchimon"); Transliteration: "Kiken na Yūgi! Pinokkimon" (Japanese: 危険な遊戯! ピノッキモン)	Hiroki Shibata	Genki Yoshimura	January 9, 2000	March 25, 2000
44	"Trash Day" ("Jureimon of the Lost Forest"); Transliteration: "Mayoi no Mori no Jureimon" (Japanese: 迷いの森のジュレイモン)	Hiroyuki Kakudō	Atsushi Maekawa	January 16, 2000	April 1, 2000
45	"The Ultimate Clash" ("Clash of the Ultimates! WarGreymon vs. MetalGarurumon"); Transliteration: "Kyūkyokutai Gekitotsu! WōGureimon tai MetaruGarurumon" (Japanese: 究極体激突! ウォーグレイモンVSメタルガルルモン)	Tetsuo Imazawa	Hiro Masaki	January 23, 2000	April 8, 2000
46	"Etemon's Comeback Tour" ("MetalEtemon's Counterattack"); Transliteration: "MetaruEtemon no Gyakushū" (Japanese: メタルエテモンの逆襲)	Takenori Kawada	Hiro Masaki	January 30, 2000	April 15, 2000
47	"Ogremon's Honor" ("Oh Wind! Oh Light! SaberLeomon"); Transliteration: "Kaze yo! Hikari yo! SāberuReomon" (Japanese: 風よ! 光よ! サーベルレオモン)	Takao Yoshizawa	Atsushi Maekawa	February 6, 2000	April 22, 2000
48	"My Sister's Keeper" ("Bombing Mission! Mugendramon"); Transliteration: "Bakugeki Shirei! Mugendoramon" (Japanese: 爆撃指令! ムゲンドラモン)	Hiroki Shibata	Satoru Nishizono	February 13, 2000	April 29, 2000
49	"The Crest of Light" ("Farewell, Numemon"); Transliteration: "Saraba Numemon" (Japanese: さらばヌメモン)	Takahiro Imamura	Yoshio Urasawa	February 20, 2000	May 6, 2000
50	"Joe's Battle" ("Battle Between Women! LadyDevimon"); Transliteration: "Onna no Tatakai! RedīDebimon" (Japanese: 女の戦い! レディデビモン)	Hiroyuki Kakudō	Atsushi Maekawa	February 27, 2000	May 13, 2000
51	"The Crest of Friendship" ("Piemon: The Clown from Hell"); Transliteration: "Jigoku no Dōkeshi Piemon" (Japanese: 地獄の道化師 ピエモン)	Takao Yoshizawa	Genki Yoshimura	March 5, 2000	May 20, 2000
52	"Piedmon's Last Jest" ("The Holy Swordsman! HolyAngemon"); Transliteration: "Seikenshi! HōrīEnjemon" (Japanese: 聖剣士! ホーリーエンジェモン)	Takenori Kawada	Hiro Masaki	March 12, 2000	May 20, 2000
53	"Now Apocalymon" ("The Final Dark Digimon"); Transliteration: "Saigo no Ankoku Dejimon" (Japanese: 最後の暗黒デジモン)	Hiroki Shibata	Genki Yoshimura	March 19, 2000	June 24, 2000
54	"The Fate of Two Worlds" ("A New World"); Transliteration: "Arata na Sekai" (Japanese: 新たな世界)	Takahiro Imamura	Hiro Masaki	March 26, 2000	June 24, 2000

=== Season 2: Digimon Adventure 02 (2000–01) ===
No.	English version title / Translated title	Directed by	Written by	Original release date	English air date
1	"Enter Flamedramon" ("The One Who Inherits Courage"); Transliteration: "Yūki o Uketsugu Mono" (Japanese: 勇気を受け継ぐ者)	Hiroyuki Kakudō	Atsushi Maekawa	April 2, 2000	August 19, 2000
2	"The Digiteam Complete" ("Digigate Opens"); Transliteration: "Dejitaru Gēto Ōpun" (Japanese: デジタルゲートオープン)	Atsutoshi Umezawa	Atsushi Maekawa	April 9, 2000	August 19, 2000
3	"A New Digitude" ("Digimental Up"); Transliteration: "Dejimentaru Appu" (Japanese: デジメンタルアップ)	Takao Yoshizawa	Genki Yoshimura	April 16, 2000	August 26, 2000
4	"Iron Vegiemon" ("Digimon Kaiser, King of Darkness"); Transliteration: "Yami no Ō Dejimon Kaizā" (Japanese: 闇の王デジモンカイザー)	Takenori Kawada	Hiro Masaki	April 23, 2000	August 26, 2000
5	"Old Reliable" ("Destroy the Dark Tower"); Transliteration: "Dāku Tawā o Taose" (Japanese: ダークタワーを倒せ)	Hiroki Shibata	Reiko Yoshida	April 30, 2000	September 2, 2000
6	"Family Picnic" ("Dangerous Picnic"); Transliteration: "Kiken na Pikunikku" (Japanese: 危険なピクニック)	Takahiro Imamura	Yoshio Urasawa	May 7, 2000	September 2, 2000
7	"Guardian Angel" ("Hikari's Memory"); Transliteration: "Hikari no Kioku" (Japanese: ヒカリノキオク)	Hiroyuki Kakudō	Atsushi Maekawa	May 14, 2000	September 9, 2000
8	"Ken's Secret" ("Loneliness of Digimon Kaiser"); Transliteration: "Dejimon Kaizā no Kodoku" (Japanese: デジモンカイザーの孤独)	Atsutoshi Umezawa	Satoru Nishizono	May 21, 2000	September 16, 2000
9	"The Emperor's New Home" ("Overdrive of the Evil Ring's Magic"); Transliteration: "Ībiru Ringu Maryoku no Bōsō" (Japanese: イービルリング魔力の暴走)	Takao Yoshizawa	Genki Yoshimura	May 28, 2000	September 23, 2000
10	"The Captive Digimon" ("The Enemy is MetalGreymon"); Transliteration: "Teki wa MetaruGureimon" (Japanese: 敵はメタルグレイモン)	Takenori Kawada	Hiro Masaki	June 4, 2000	September 30, 2000
11	"Storm of Friendship" ("Lighdramon, the Blue Thunder"); Transliteration: "Aoi Inazuma Raidoramon" (Japanese: 青い稲妻ライドラモン)	Hiroki Shibata	Genki Yoshimura	June 11, 2000	October 7, 2000
12	"The Good, the Bad, and the Digi" ("Duel on the Digimon Ranch"); Transliteration: "Dejimon Bokujō no Kettō" (Japanese: デジモン牧場の決闘)	Takahiro Imamura	Yoshio Urasawa	June 18, 2000	October 14, 2000
13	"His Master's Voice" ("The Call of Dagomon"); Transliteration: "Dagomon no Yobigoe" (Japanese: ダゴモンの呼び声)	Hiroyuki Kakudō	Chiaki J. Konaka	June 25, 2000	October 21, 2000
14	"The Samurai of Sincerity" ("Shurimon of the Wind"); Transliteration: "Shippū no Shurimon" (Japanese: 疾風のシュリモン)	Atsutoshi Umezawa	Genki Yoshimura	July 2, 2000	October 28, 2000
15	"Big Trouble in Little Edo" ("Shurimon's Martial Arts"); Transliteration: "Shurimon Bugeichō" (Japanese: シュリモン武芸帳)	Takao Yoshizawa	Atsushi Maekawa	July 16, 2000	November 4, 2000
16	"20,000 Digi-Leagues Under the Sea" ("Sabmarimon's Escape from the Bottom of the Sea"); Transliteration: "Sabumarimon Kaitei kara no Dasshutsu" (Japanese: サブマリモン海底からの脱出)	Takenori Kawada	Hiro Masaki	July 23, 2000	November 4, 2000
17	"Ghost of a Chance" ("Odaiba Memorial"); Transliteration: "Odaiba Memoriaru" (Japanese: お台場メモリアル)	Hiroki Shibata	Genki Yoshimura	July 30, 2000	November 11, 2000
18	"Run Yolei Run" ("Tracking Down the Base of the Kaiser!"); Transliteration: "Kaizā no Kichi o Oe!" (Japanese: カイザーの基地を追え!)	Takahiro Imamura	Atsushi Maekawa	August 6, 2000	November 11, 2000
19	"An Old Enemy Returns" ("The Synthetic Demon Beast, Kimeramon"); Transliteration: "Gōsei Majū Kimeramon" (Japanese: 合成魔獣キメラモン)	Hiroyuki Kakudō	Hiro Masaki	August 13, 2000	November 18, 2000
20	"The Darkness Before Dawn" ("Transcendent Evolution! Gold Magnamon"); Transliteration: "Chōzetsu Shinka! Ōgon no Magunamon" (Japanese: 超絶進化! 黄金のマグナモン)	Atsutoshi Umezawa	Reiko Yoshida	August 20, 2000	November 18, 2000
21	"The Crest of Kindness" ("Good-Bye, Ken-chan!"); Transliteration: "Sayonara, Ken-chan..." (Japanese: サヨナラ、賢ちゃん...)	Takao Yoshizawa	Atsushi Maekawa	August 27, 2000	November 18, 2000
22	"Davis Cries Wolfmon" ("The Brave Evolution! XV-mon"); Transliteration: "Gōyū Shinka! EkusuBuimon" (Japanese: 豪勇進化! エクスブイモン)	Takenori Kawada	Yoshio Urasawa	September 3, 2000	December 2, 2000
23	"Genesis of Evil" ("When the Digivice is Tainted by Darkness"); Transliteration: "Dejivaisu ga Yami ni Somaru Toki" (Japanese: デジヴァイスが闇に染まる時)	Hiroki Shibata	Genki Yoshimura	September 10, 2000	December 2, 2000
24	"If I had a Tail Hammer" ("Ankylomon – Warrior of the Earth"); Transliteration: "Daichi no Sōkō Ankiromon" (Japanese: 大地の装甲アンキロモン)	Takahiro Imamura	Reiko Yoshida	September 17, 2000	December 9, 2000
25	"Spirit Needle" ("Sky Knight – Aquilamon"); Transliteration: "Ōzora no Kishi Akuiramon" (Japanese: 大空の騎士アクィラモン)	Atsutoshi Umezawa	Hiro Masaki	September 24, 2000	December 9, 2000
26	"United We Stand" ("Jogress Evolve Now, Hearts Together as One"); Transliteration: "Joguresu Shinka Ima, Kokoro o Hitotsu ni" (Japanese: ジョグレス進化 今、心をひとつに)	Hiroyuki Kakudō	Genki Yoshimura	October 1, 2000	February 3, 2001
27	"Fusion Confusion" ("The Unparalleled Union! Paildramon"); Transliteration: "Muteki Gattai! Pairudoramon" (Japanese: 無敵合体! パイルドラモン)	Takao Yoshizawa	Atsushi Maekawa	October 8, 2000	February 3, 2001
28	"The Insect Master's Trap" ("Bug Charmer's Trap!!"); Transliteration: "Konchū Tsukai no Wana!!" (Japanese: 昆虫使いの罠!!)	Takenori Kawada	Hiro Masaki	October 15, 2000	February 3, 2001
29	"Arukenimon's Tangled Web" ("Arukenimon, the Mistake of the Spider Woman"); Transliteration: "Arukenimon Kumojo no Misu" (Japanese: アルケニモン 蜘蛛女のミス)	Hiroki Shibata	Hiro Masaki	October 22, 2000	February 10, 2001
30	"Ultimate Anti-Hero" ("The Dark Ultimate – BlackWarGreymon"); Transliteration: "Ankoku Kyūkyokutai BurakkuWōGureimon" (Japanese: 暗黒究極体ブラックウォーグレイモン)	Takahiro Imamura	Yoshio Urasawa	October 29, 2000	February 10, 2001
31	"Opposites Attract" ("Silphymon – The Storm of Love"); Transliteration: "Ai no Arashi Shirufīmon" (Japanese: 愛の嵐シルフィーモン)	Atsutoshi Umezawa	Reiko Yoshida	November 5, 2000	February 17, 2001
32	"If I Only had a Heart" ("Mysterious Ruins, Holy Stone"); Transliteration: "Nazo no Iseki Hōrī Sutōn" (Japanese: 謎の遺跡ホーリーストーン)	Noriyo Sasaki	Hiro Masaki	November 12, 2000	February 17, 2001
33	"A Chance Encounter" ("Miyako in Kyoto Today"); Transliteration: "Kyō no Miyako wa Kyō no Miyako" (Japanese: 今日のミヤコは京の都)	Hiroyuki Kakudō	Genki Yoshimura	November 19, 2000	February 24, 2001
34	"Destiny in Doubt" ("Protect the Holy Point"); Transliteration: "Hōrī Pointo o Mamore" (Japanese: ホーリーポイントを守れ)	Takao Yoshizawa	Reiko Yoshida	November 26, 2000	February 24, 2001
35	"Cody Takes a Stand" ("Assault on BlackWarGreymon"); Transliteration: "Bakushin! BurakkuWōGureimon" (Japanese: 爆進! ブラックウォーグレイモン)	Takenori Kawada	Atsushi Maekawa	December 3, 2000	March 3, 2001
36	"Stone Soup" ("The Steel Angel – Shakkoumon"); Transliteration: "Hagane no Tenshi Shakkoumon" (Japanese: 鋼の天使シャッコウモン)	Hiroki Shibata	Yoshi Urasawa	December 10, 2000	March 10, 2001
37	"Kyoto Dragon" ("The Gigantic Ultimate – Qinglongmon"); Transliteration: "Kyodai Kyūkyokutai Chinronmon" (Japanese: 巨大究極体チンロンモン)	Atsutoshi Umezawa	Genki Yoshimura	December 17, 2000	March 17, 2001
38	"A Very Digi-Christmas" ("Holy Night the Digimon Big Gathering!"); Transliteration: "Horī Naito Dejimon Daishūgō!" (Japanese: ホーリーナイト デジモン大集合!)	Noriyo Sasaki	Genki Yoshimura	December 24, 2000	March 24, 2001
39	"Dramon Power" ("All DigiDestined, In Action! Imperialdramon!"); Transliteration: "Zen'in Shutsudō! Inperiarudoramon" (Japanese: 全員出動! インペリアルドラモン)	Hiroyuki Kakudō	Atsushi Maekawa	January 7, 2001	March 31, 2001
40	"Digimon World Tour, Part 1" ("New York, Hong Kong Super Melee!"); Transliteration: "Nyū Yōku Honkon Daikonsen!" (Japanese: ニューヨーク香港大混戦!)	Takao Yoshizawa	Hiro Masaki	January 14, 2001	April 7, 2001
41	"Digimon World Tour, Part 2" ("Coral and Versailles, the Rebel Fight"); Transliteration: "Sango to Berusaiyu Dairansen!" (Japanese: サンゴとベルサイユ大乱戦!)	Takenori Kawada	Yoshio Urasawa	January 21, 2001	April 14, 2001
42	"Digimon World Tour, Part 3" ("Love and Borscht, The Ferocious Battle"); Transliteration: "Koi to Borushichi Daigekisen!" (Japanese: 恋とボルシチ大激戦!)	Hiroki Shibata	Reiko Yoshida	January 28, 2001	April 21, 2001
43	"Invasion of the Daemon Corps" ("Onslaught of the Daemon Army"); Transliteration: "Dēmon Gundan no Shūrai" (Japanese: デーモン軍団の襲来)	Atsutoshi Umezawa	Genki Yoshimura	February 4, 2001	April 28, 2001
44	"Dark Sun, Dark Spore" ("The Deadly Battle Against the Dark Digimon"); Transliteration: "Ankoku Dejimon to no Shitō" (Japanese: 暗黒デジモンとの死闘)	Noriyo Sasaki	Hiro Masaki	February 11, 2001	April 28, 2001
45	"The Dark Gate" ("The Gate of Darkness"); Transliteration: "Ankoku no Gēto" (Japanese: 暗黒のゲート)	Hiroyuki Kakudō	Atsushi Maekawa	February 18, 2001	May 5, 2001
46	"Duel of the WarGreymon" ("BlackWarGreymon vs. WarGreymon"); Transliteration: "BurakkuWōGureimon VS WōGureimon" (Japanese: ブラックウォーグレイモンVSウォーグレイモン)	Takao Yoshizawa	Hiro Masaki	February 25, 2001	May 5, 2001
47	"BlackWarGreymon's Destiny" ("The Seal of BlackWarGreymon"); Transliteration: "BurakkuWōGureimon no Fūin" (Japanese: ブラックウォーグレイモンの封印)	Takenori Kawada	Genki Yoshimura	March 4, 2001	May 12, 2001
48	"Oikawa's Shame" ("The Terror of BelialVamdemon"); Transliteration: "Kyōfu! BeriaruVandemon" (Japanese: 恐怖! ベリアルヴァンデモン)	Hiroki Shibata	Hiro Masaki	March 11, 2001	May 12, 2001
49	"The Last Temptation of the DigiDestined" ("The Last Armor Evolution"); Transliteration: "Saigo no Āmā Shinka" (Japanese: 最後のアーマー進化)	Atsutoshi Umezawa	Atsushi Maekawa	March 18, 2001	May 19, 2001
50	"A Million Points of Light" ("Our Digital World"); Transliteration: "Bokura no Dejitaru Wārudo" (Japanese: ぼくらのデジタルワールド)	Hiroyuki Kakudō	Genki Yoshimura	March 25, 2001	May 19, 2001

=== Season 3: Digimon Tamers (2001–02) ===
No.	Fox Kids title (Original Japanese title translated to English) Original Japanese title	Original release date	English air date
1	"Guilmon Comes Alive" ("Guilmon is Born! The Digimon that I Created"); Transliteration: "Girumon Tanjō! Boku no Kangaeta Dejimon" (Japanese: ギルモン誕生!僕の考えたデジモン)	April 1, 2001	September 1, 2001
2	"Digimon, Digimon Everywhere" ("You're my Friend! Introducing Terriermon"); Transliteration: "Kimi wa Boku no Tomodachi Teriamon Tōjō!" (Japanese: 君はぼくのともだち テリアモン登場!)	April 8, 2001	September 1, 2001
3	"To Fight or Not to Fight" ("Renamon VS Guilmon! Battle is a Digimon's Life"); Transliteration: "Renamon Tai Girumon! Tatakai Koso ga Dejimon no Inochi" (Japanese: レナモン対ギルモン!戦いこそがデジモンの命)	April 15, 2001	September 8, 2001
4	"It Came from the Other Side" ("A Tamer's Trial! Defeat Gorillamon!"); Transliteration: "Teimā no Shiren! Gorimon o Taose!" (Japanese: テイマーの試練!ゴリモンを倒せ!)	April 22, 2001	September 8, 2001
5	"Dream a Little Dream" ("Rollin'-rollin'! Let's Play with Calumon!"); Transliteration: "Kurukkurūn! Kurumon to Asobo!" (Japanese: くるっくるーん!クルモンと遊ぼ!)	April 29, 2001	September 15, 2001
6	"O Partner, Where Art Thou?" ("The Meaning of Partners, Renamon Evolves"); Transliteration: "Pātonā no Imi, Renamon Shinka!" (Japanese: パートナーの意味 レナモン進化!)	May 6, 2001	September 15, 2001
7	"Now You See It, Now You Don't" ("Crisis for Guilmon! The Adventure in my Town"); Transliteration: "Girumon ga Abunai! Boku no Machi no Bōken" (Japanese: ギルモンが危ない! ぼくの町の冒険)	May 13, 2001	September 22, 2001
8	"A Question of Trust" ("Guilmon Evolves! Decisive Battle in West Shinjuku"); Transliteration: "Girumon Shinka! Nishi Shinjuku Daikessen" (Japanese: ギルモン進化!西新宿大決戦)	May 20, 2001	September 22, 2001
9	"Not as Seen on TV" ("Revert to Guilmon! The Growmon Incident"); Transliteration: "Girumon ni Modotte! Guraumon Sōdō" (Japanese: ギルモンに戻って!グラウモン騒動)	May 27, 2001	September 29, 2001
10	"The Icemon Cometh" ("Renamon is my Friend! Ruki's Hesitation"); Transliteration: "Renamon wa Tomodachi! Ruki no Mayoi" (Japanese: レナモンは友達!留姫の迷い)	June 3, 2001	September 29, 2001
11	"Much Ado About Musyamon" ("Shinjuku Railroad Bridge...Duel for a Minute and a Half!"); Transliteration: "Shinjuku Dai Gādo Ippun-Sanjūbyou no Taiketsu!" (Japanese: 新宿大ガード 1分30秒の対決!)	June 10, 2001	October 6, 2001
12	"Divided They Stand" ("Ruki and Renamon, The Crisis of the Bond!"); Transliteration: "Ruki to Renamon Kizuna no Kiki!" (Japanese: 留姫とレナモン きずなの危機!)	June 17, 2001	October 6, 2001
13	"Juggernaut" ("The Order to Capture the Digimon! The Sinister Foreboding"); Transliteration: "Dejimon Hokaku Shirei! Wazawai no Yokan" (Japanese: デジモン捕獲指令!災いの予感)	June 24, 2001	October 13, 2001
14	"Grow Mon Grow" ("Stand up, Tamers! MegaloGrowmon Super Evolution!"); Transliteration: "Teimā yo Tate! Megaroguraumon Chō-Shinka" (Japanese: テイマーよ立て!メガログラウモン超進化)	July 1, 2001	October 20, 2001
15	"Snakes, Trains, and Digimon" ("Giant Snake Appearance! Ōedo Line Great Panic"); Transliteration: "Kyodai Hebi Shutsugen! Ōedo-Sen Dai-Panikku" (Japanese: 巨大ヘビ出現!大江戸線大パニック)	July 8, 2001	October 27, 2001
16	"Back to Nature, Back to Battle" ("Protect the Light of the Town! Dangerous Camp of the Digimon"); Transliteration: "Machi no Akari o Mamore! Dejimon-tachi no Kiken na Kyampu" (Japanese: 街の灯を守れ!デジモンたちの危険なキャンプ)	July 15, 2001	November 3, 2001
17	"Duel with the Deva" ("Chase the Blue Card! The Rapidmon Moment"); Transliteration: "Burū-Kādo o Oe! Rapiddomon Denkōsekka" (Japanese: ブルーカードを追え! ラピッドモン電光石火)	July 29, 2001	November 3, 2001
18	"Digital Beauty" ("Beautiful Evolution! Taomon Dances in the Moonlight"); Transliteration: "Utsukushiki Shinka! Gekkō ni Mau Taomon" (Japanese: 美しき進化! 月光に舞うタオモン)	August 5, 2001	November 10, 2001
19	"Impmon's Last Stand" ("I Would Like to Become Strong! Rise, Impmon!"); Transliteration: "Tsuyoku Naritai! Haiagare Inpumon" (Japanese: 強くなりたい! 這い上がれインプモン)	August 12, 2001	November 10, 2001
20	"Out of the Blue" ("The Last Resort is This! Blue Card of Friendship"); Transliteration: "Kirifuda wa Kore da! Yūjō no Burū Kādo" (Japanese: 切り札はこれだ!友情のブルーカード)	August 19, 2001	November 17, 2001
21	"Jeri's Quest" ("Juri's Partner!? My Mr. Leomon"); Transliteration: "Jere no Pātonā!? Watashi no Reomon-sama" (Japanese: 樹莉のパートナー!? 私のレオモン様)	August 26, 2001	November 17, 2001
22	"The Boar Wars" ("Vikaralamon Appears! Protect Our Town!"); Transliteration: "Vikarāramon Tōjō Boku-tachi no Machi o Mamore!" (Japanese: ヴィカラーラモン登場 僕たちの街を守れ!)	September 2, 2001	November 24, 2001
23	"A World Apart" ("Digimon Total Sortie! Advancing while Facing the Wind"); Transliteration: "Dejimon Soushutsugeki! Kaze ni Mukatte Susume" (Japanese: デジモン総出撃!風に向かって進め)	September 9, 2001	December 1, 2001
24	"The Journey Begins" ("To the Digital World... The Day of Departure"); Transliteration: "Dejitaru Wārudo e... Tabidachi no Hi" (Japanese: デジタルワールドへ...旅立ちの日)	September 16, 2001	December 8, 2001
25	"Brave New Digital World" ("Enter the Digital World! Goodbye to Our City"); Transliteration: "Dejitaru Wārudo Totsunyū! Saraba Boku-tachi no Machi" (Japanese: デジタルワールド突入!さらば僕たちの街)	September 23, 2001	December 15, 2001
26	"Kazu and Kenta's Excellent Adventure" ("Little World! Jijimon and Babamon in the Strong Wind Valley"); Transliteration: "Shōsekai! Kaze no Tsuyoi Tani no Jijimon Babamon" (Japanese: 小世界! 風の強い谷のジジモン・ババモン)	September 30, 2001	February 9, 2002
27	"Motorcycle Madness" ("Impmon Evolves! The Shudder of Beelzebumon the Dark Lord"); Transliteration: "Inpumon Shinka! Maō Beruzebumon no Senritsu" (Japanese: インプモン進化! 魔王ベルゼブモンの戦慄)	October 7, 2001	February 9, 2002
28	"Blame it on Ryo" ("Friend or Foe!? The Legendary Tamer, Ryo Akiyama"); Transliteration: "Teki ka, Mikata ka!? Densetsu no Teimā Akiyama Ryō" (Japanese: 敵か味方か!? 伝説のテイマー秋山リョウ)	October 14, 2001	February 16, 2002
29	"Goliath" ("Here is the Ghost Castle! The Great Escape of Stray Culumon"); Transliteration: "Koko wa Yūrei no Shiro! Mayoeru Kurumon Daidasshutsu" (Japanese: ここは幽霊の城! 迷えるクルモン大脱出)	October 21, 2001	February 16, 2002
30	"The Imperfect Storm" ("Urgent Message from the Digital World, Culumon is..."); Transliteration: "Dejitaru Wārudo kara Kinkyū Renraku, Kurumon ga..." (Japanese: デジタルワールドから緊急連絡 クルモンが...)	October 28, 2001	February 23, 2002
31	"Kazu's Upgrade" ("Friendship with Guardromon! 'I'll fight too!', Tamer Hirokazu"); Transliteration: "Gādoromon to no Yūjō! Boku mo Tatakau Teimā Hirokazu" (Japanese: ガードロモンとの友情! 僕も戦うテイマーヒロカズ)	November 4, 2001	February 23, 2002
32	"Shibumi Speaks" ("The Mystery of Guilmon's Birth! The Mystic Water Space"); Transliteration: "Girumon Tanjō no Nazo! Shinpi Naru Uōtā Supēsu" (Japanese: ギルモン誕生の謎! 神秘なる水の宇宙)	November 11, 2001	March 2, 2002
33	"Rabbit Transit" ("Where is Terriermon? Shiuchon goes to the Digital World!"); Transliteration: "Teriamon wa Doko! Shiuchon Dejitaru Wārudo e" (Japanese: テリアモンはどこ! 小春デジタルワールドへ)	November 18, 2001	March 2, 2002
34	"Lionheart" ("The Kind-Hearted Hero, Leomon Dies"); Transliteration: "Kokoro Yasashiki Yūsha Reomon Shisu!" (Japanese: 心優しき勇者 レオモン死す!)	November 25, 2001	March 9, 2002
35	"Give a Little Bit" ("The Name is Dukemon! The True Ultimate Evolution"); Transliteration: "Sono Na wa Dyūkumon! Shin Naru Kyūkyoku Shinka" (Japanese: その名はデュークモン!真なる究極進化)	December 2, 2001	March 9, 2002
36	"The Battle Within" ("Final Fight! Dukemon vs. Beelzebumon"); Transliteration: "Kessen! Dyūkumon Tai Beruzebumon" (Japanese: 決戦!デュークモン対ベルゼブモン)	December 9, 2001	March 16, 2002
37	"No Mon is an Island" ("Showdown with Zhuqiaomon! SaintGalgomon, Ultimate Evolution"); Transliteration: "Taiketsu Sūtsēmon! Sentogarugomon Kyūkyoku Shinka" (Japanese: 対決スーツェーモン! セントガルゴモン究極進化)	December 16, 2001	March 16, 2002
38	"Azulongmon Explains It All" ("True Enemy Gets to Move! The Battle of the Four Holy Beasts"); Transliteration: "Ugoki-dashita Shin no Teki! Shiseijū no Tatakai" (Japanese: 動き出した真の敵! 四聖獣の戦い)	December 23, 2001	March 23, 2002
39	"Song of Sakuyamon" ("Whirling Ultimate Flower! Sakuyamon Evolves"); Transliteration: "Maichiru Kyūkyoku no Hana! Sakuyamon Shinka" (Japanese: 舞い散る究極の花!サクヤモン進化)	December 30, 2001	March 30, 2002
40	"Janyu's Ark" ("Evolutionary Radiance: Shining Evolution"); Transliteration: "Shinka no Kagayaki, Shainingu Eboryūshon" (Japanese: 進化の輝き シャイニング・エボリューション)	January 6, 2002	April 6, 2002
41	"Homeward Bound" ("The Return to the Real World!"); Transliteration: "Kikan Riaru Wārudo e!" (Japanese: 帰還 リアルワールドへ!)	January 13, 2002	April 13, 2002
42	"Reunion" ("The City Attacked by the D-Reaper, The Tamer's Resolve"); Transliteration: "De Rīpā ni Osowareta Machi Teimā no Ketsui" (Japanese: デ・リーパーに襲われた街 テイマー決意)	January 20, 2002	April 20, 2002
43	"Beelzemon's Big Day" ("Connected Hearts, Beelzebumon's Resurrection"); Transliteration: "Tsunagaru Kokoro, Fukkatsu no Beruzebumon" (Japanese: つながる心 復活のベルゼブモン)	January 27, 2002	April 27, 2002
44	"The Messenger" ("The Mysterious Girl! Bringer of Miracles, Dobermon"); Transliteration: "Nazo no Shōjo! Kiseki o Hakobu Dōberumon" (Japanese: 謎の少女!奇跡を運ぶドーベルモン)	February 3, 2002	May 4, 2002
45	"The D-Reaper's Disguise" ("Stand Up to the D-Reaper, Charge into the Zone!"); Transliteration: "De Rīpā ni Tachimukae Zōn Totsunyū!" (Japanese: デ•リーパーに立ち向かえ ゾーン突入!)	February 17, 2002	May 11, 2002
46	"When is a Mon Justimon?" ("The Invigorating Ultimate Warrior, Justimon Appears!"); Transliteration: "Sawayaka na Kyūkyoku Senshi Jasutimon Kenzan!" (Japanese: 爽やかな究極戦士 ジャスティモン見参!)	February 24, 2002	May 11, 2002
47	"His Kingdom for a Horse" ("Save Dukemon! Grani Scramble"); Transliteration: "Dyūkumon o Sukue! Gurani Kinkyūhasshin" (Japanese: デュークモンを救え!グラニ緊急発進)	March 3, 2002	May 18, 2002
48	"Shadow of the Beast King" ("The Power to Save Juri! Beelzebumon's Fist"); Transliteration: "Juri o Mamoru Chikara, Beruzebumon no Ken" (Japanese: 樹莉を守る力、ベルゼブモンの拳)	March 10, 2002	May 18, 2002
49	"D-Reaper's Feast" ("Destruction of the Capital! Culumon's Wish"); Transliteration: "Shuto Kaimetsu! Kurumon no Negai" (Japanese: 首都壊滅!クルモンの願い)	March 17, 2002	June 1, 2002
50	"Jeri Fights Back" ("Crimson Knight, Dukemon! Save the People you Love"); Transliteration: "Shinku no Kishi Dukemon Ai Suru Mono-tachi o Sukue!" (Japanese: 真紅の騎士デュークモン 愛するものたちを救え!)	March 24, 2002	June 8, 2002
51	"Such Sweet Sorrow" ("The Power to Dream is Our Future"); Transliteration: "Yume Miru Chikara Koso Boku-tachi no Mirai" (Japanese: 夢見る力こそ 僕たちの未来)	March 31, 2002	June 8, 2002

=== Season 4: Digimon Frontier (2002–03) ===
No.	English Title (Original Japanese title translated to English) Original Japanese title	Original release date	US air date
1	"All Aboard!" ("The Legendary Warrior! Agnimon of Fire"); Transliteration: "Densetsu no Tōshi! Honō no Agnimon" (Japanese: 伝説の闘士! 炎のアグニモン)	April 7, 2002	September 9, 2002
2	"Lobomon: Warrior of Light" ("Wolfmon of Light, The Underground Labyrinth Battle!"); Transliteration: "Hikari no Vorufumon Chikameikyū no Tatakai!" (Japanese: 光のヴォルフモン 地下迷宮の戦い！)	April 14, 2002	September 16, 2002
3	"Kumamon Baby, Light My Fire" ("Bullying is Unforgivable! Evolve, Chakukmon of Ice"); Transliteration: "Ijime wa Yurusanai! Kōri no Chakkumon Shinka" (Japanese: いじめは許さない！氷のチャックモン進化)	April 21, 2002	September 23, 2002
4	"Kazemon Kicks It" ("My Kick is Painful! Female Warrior Fairymon"); Transliteration: "Watashi no Kikku wa Itai wa yo! Onna Tōshi Fearimon" (Japanese: 私のキックは痛いわよ！女闘士フェアリモン)	April 28, 2002	September 30, 2002
5	"Ladies and Gentlemen: The Beetlemon" ("Thunder Power Shaking the Ground, Blitzmon!"); Transliteration: "Daichi o Yurugasu Ikazura Pawā, Burittsumon!" (Japanese: 大地を揺るがす雷パワー ブリッツモン！)	May 5, 2002	October 7, 2002
6	"A Molehill Out of a Mountain" ("The Five Legendary Warriors VS The New Warrior!"); Transliteration: "Denetsu no Gotōshi tai Aratanaru Tōshi!" (Japanese: 伝説の5闘士VS新たなる闘士!)	May 12, 2002	October 14, 2002
7	"Island of Misfit Boys" ("Town Floating in the Sky! Toy Country of ToyAgumon"); Transliteration: "Sora ni Ukabu Machi! Toiagumon no Omocha no Kuni" (Japanese: 空に浮かぶ街! トイアグモンのおもちゃの国)	May 19, 2002	October 21, 2002
8	"Odd One Out" ("Save Everyone! Evolve Tsunomon"); Transliteration: "Minna o Sukue! Shinka surun da Tsunomon" (Japanese: みんなを救え! 進化するんだツノモン)	May 26, 2002	October 28, 2002
9	"Welcome to My Nightmare" ("Chakumon is the Enemy!? The Mysterious TV Forest"); Transliteration: "Teki wa Chakumon!? Nazo no Terebi no Mori" (Japanese: 敵はチャックモン!? 謎のテレビの森)	June 2, 2002	November 11, 2002
10	"Can't Keep a Grumblemon Down" ("Uncontrollable Beast Spirit! Garmmon's Evolution"); Transliteration: "Bīsuto Supiritto wa Seigyo Funō!? Garumumon Shinka!" (Japanese: ビーストスピリットは制御不能!? ガルムモン進化!)	June 9, 2002	November 12, 2002
11	"A Hunka Hunka BurningGreymon" ("Defeat Me! Legendary Warrior Vritramon Runs Wild"); Transliteration: "Ore o Taose! Densetsu no Tōshi Vuritoramon Bōsō" (Japanese: 俺を倒せ! 伝説の闘士ヴリトラモン暴走)	June 16, 2002	November 13, 2002
12	"Fear and Loathing in Los Arboles" ("Roar, Vritramon! Defeat Gigasmon!"); Transliteration: "Hoero Vuritoramon! Taose Gigasumon!" (Japanese: ほえろヴリトラモン! 倒せギガスモン!)	June 23, 2002	November 14, 2002
13	"Better an Egg than an Egg Shell" ("Seraphimon Awakens! Secret of the Ten Warriors"); Transliteration: "Mezameyo Serafimon! Jū Tōshi no Himitsu" (Japanese: 目覚めよセラフィモン! 十闘士の秘密)	June 30, 2002	November 15, 2002
14	"No Whamon" ("Rock Breaking Thunder! Bolgmon's Do-or-Die Challenge""); Transliteration: "Kaminari yo! Iwa o mo Kudake! Borugumon Kesshi no Charenji" (Japanese: 雷よ! 岩をも砕け! ボルグモン決死のチャレンジ)	July 14, 2002	November 18, 2002
15	"Beastie Girl" ("Cool Beast Evolution! Calmaramon"); Transliteration: "Ikashita Bīsuto Shinka! Karumāramon" (Japanese: イカしたビースト進化! カルマーラモン)	July 21, 2002	November 19, 2002
16	"The Swiss Family Digimon" ("Strength Does Not Matter! The Beautiful Warrior, Shutumon"); Transliteration: "Tsuyoi Dake ja Dame na no yo! Utsukushiki Tōshi Shūtsumon" (Japanese: 強いだけじゃだめなのよ! 美しき闘士シューツモン)	July 28, 2002	November 20, 2002
17	"Bizarre Bazaar" ("Blizzarmon, Blow the Snow, Call the Glaciers!"); Transliteration: "Burizāmon Fukeyo Yuki, Yobeyo Hyōga!" (Japanese: ブリザーモン 吹けよ雪、呼べよ氷河!)	August 4, 2002	November 21, 2002
18	"Trailmon vs. Trailmon" ("Choo-Choo! The Great Trailmon Race"); Transliteration: "Chikichiki! Toreirumon Mō Rēsu" (Japanese: チキチキ! トレイルモン猛レース)	August 11, 2002	November 22, 2002
19	"You Want Fries with That?" ("Save the Burgermon! Tomoki's Pure Heart!"); Transliteration: "Bāgamon o Sukue! Tomoki no Pyua na Kokoro" (Japanese: バーガモンを救え! 友樹のピュアな心)	August 18, 2002	December 16, 2002
20	"From Dawn to Duskmon" ("Mystery Warrior Hidden in Darkness, Duskmon!"); Transliteration: "Yami ni Hisomu Nazo no Tōshi Dasukumon!" (Japanese: 闇にひそむ謎の闘士 ダスクモン!)	August 25, 2002	December 17, 2002
21	"Darkest Before Duskmon" ("Total Destruction of 5 Fighters!? Terrifying Dark Power"); Transliteration: "Go Tōshi Zenmetsu!? Osorerubeki Yami no Pawā!" (Japanese: 五闘士全滅!? 恐るべき闇のパワー!)	September 1, 2002	December 18, 2002
22	"Home Again, Takuya Returns" ("My home! Takuya's Lonely Return"); Transliteration: "Wagaya e! Takuya Tatta Hitori no Kikan" (Japanese: 我が家へ! 拓也たった一人の帰還)	September 8, 2002	December 19, 2002
23	"Sockit Takuya" ("Feel the Power of Digimon! Takuya's Full-Body Strategy"); Transliteration: "Kanjiro Dejimon no Chikara! Takuya Konshin no Sakusen" (Japanese: 感じろデジモンの力! 拓也渾身の作戦)	September 15, 2002	February 10, 2003
24	"Alone but Never Alone" ("Confrontation, Volcamon! Junpei's Battle with his Past""); Transliteration: "Taiketsu Borukēmon! Junpei, Kako to no Gekitō" (Japanese: 対決ボルケーモン! 純平、過去との激闘)	September 22, 2002	February 11, 2003
25	"The Dark Heart of Friendship" ("Tomoki's Lonely Battle – Asuramon's Trap"); Transliteration: "Tomoki no Kodoku na Tatakai, Ashuramon no Wana" (Japanese: 友樹の孤独な戦い アシュラモンの罠)	September 29, 2002	February 12, 2003
26	"Zoe's Unbeelievable Adventure" ("Ranamon's Tenacity! Female Digimon Personal Combat"); Transliteration: "Rānamon no Shūnen! Onna Dejimon Ikki Uchi" (Japanese: ラーナモンの執念! 女デジモン一騎撃ち)	October 6, 2002	February 13, 2003
27	"Stuck in Sakkakumon with You" ("Double Spirit Miracle! Beowulfmon is Born"); Transliteration: "Kiseki no Daburu Supiritto! Beourufumon Tanjō" (Japanese: 奇跡のダブルスピリット! ベオウルフモン誕生)	October 13, 2002	February 14, 2003
28	"Darkness Before the Dawn" ("Takuya's Fusion Evolution – Aldamon's Explosive Attack"); Transliteration: "Takuya no Yūgō Shinka Arudamon Waza Sakuretsu!" (Japanese: 拓也の融合進化 アルダモン技炸裂!)	October 20, 2002	February 17, 2003
29	"Phantasmagoric Sakkakumon" ("Escape! The Phantasmagoric Sefirotmon"); Transliteration: "Tōsō! Hengen Jizai Serufirotomon" (Japanese: 逃走! 変幻自在セフィロトモン)	October 27, 2002	February 18, 2003
30	"O, Brother, Who Art Thou?" ("Soaring! Warrior of Darkness Velgmon"); Transliteration: "Hishō! Yami no Tōshi Berugumon" (Japanese: 飛翔! 闇の闘士ベルグモン)	November 3, 2002	February 19, 2003
31	"Workin' on the Train Gang" ("Sleep in Darkness – The Trailmon's Graveyard"); Transliteration: "Yami ni Nemuru Toreirumon no Hakaba" (Japanese: 闇に眠る トレイルモンの墓場)	November 10, 2002	February 20, 2003
32	"My Brother in Spirit" ("The Revealed Past! Duskmon's Secret"); Transliteration: "Akasareta Kako! Dasukumon no Himitsu" (Japanese: 明かされた過去! ダスクモンの秘密)	November 17, 2002	March 24, 2003
33	"Ne'er the Twins Shall Meet" ("The New Warriors of Darkness! Löwemon & JägerLöwemon"); Transliteration: "Aratanaru Yami no Tōshi! Rēbemon to Kaizāreomon" (Japanese: 新たなる闇の闘士! レーベモンとカイザーレオモン)	November 24, 2002	March 25, 2003
34	"Operation: Free Ophanimon" ("Decisive Battle!! Rose of the Morning Star – Ophanimon's Rescue Plan""); Transliteration: "Kessen! Bara no Myōjō Ofanimon Kyūshutsu Sakusen" (Japanese: 決戦! バラの明星 オファニモン救出作戦)	December 1, 2002	March 26, 2003
35	"Takuya and Koji's Evolution Revolution" ("Turn the Spirits Into One! Takuya and Kouji's Ultimate Evolution!"); Transliteration: "Supiritto o Hitotsu ni! Takuya to Kōji no Kyūkyoku Shinka" (Japanese: スピリットを一つに! 拓也と輝二の究極進化)	December 8, 2002	March 27, 2003
36	"Ice Ice Baby" ("The Flight Towards Victory! Confrontation at Cherubimon's Castle"); Transliteration: "Shōri e no Hishō! Taiketsu Kerubimon no Shiro" (Japanese: 勝利への飛翔! 対決ケルビモンの城)	December 15, 2002	March 28, 2003
37	"Cherubimania" ("Decisive Battle! As Long as There is Life – Get Back the Digital World"); Transliteration: "Kessen! Inochi Aru Kagiri Dejitaru Wārudo o Torimodose" (Japanese: 決戦! 命ある限り デジタルワールドを取り戻せ)	December 22, 2002	May 11, 2003
38	"It Can't Be! Lucemon Reappears" ("The Endless Death Match! Prelude of Lucemon's Revival"); Transliteration: "Owaranai Shitō! Rūchemon Fukkatsu no Jokyoku" (Japanese: 終わらない死闘! ルーチェモン復活の序曲)	January 5, 2003	May 12, 2003
39	"The Man in the Moon is You" ("This is the Digital World?! Escape from the Moon!"); Transliteration: "Kore ga Dejitaru Wārudo!? Tsuki kara Dasshutsu" (Japanese: これがデジタルワールド!? 月からの脱出!)	January 12, 2003	May 13, 2003
40	"The Bully Pulpit" ("The Chosen Ones! The Children who Manipulate Digital Egg!"); Transliteration: "Ebareshimono!? Digital Egg o Ayatsuru Shōnen!" (Japanese: 選ばれし者!? 數碼蛋を操る少年!)	January 19, 2003	May 14, 2003
41	"Jerks and the Beanstalk" ("Don't Let Them Scan! The Beanstalk of Friendship"); Transliteration: "Sukyan Saseru na! Yūjō no Mamenoki" (Japanese: スキャンさせるな! 友情の豆の木)	January 26, 2003	May 15, 2003
42	"Glean Eggs and Scram" ("Protect the DigiEggs! The Miracle of Disappearing Life"); Transliteration: "Dejitama o Mamore! Kieyuku Inochi no Kiseki" (Japanese: デジタマを守れ! 消えゆく命の奇跡)	February 2, 2003	May 16, 2003
43	"Bad to the Bones" ("Annihilation of the Hometown! Messenger of Hell Forest Village"); Transliteration: "Furusato Shōmetsu! Jigoku no Shisha Forest Village" (Japanese: 故郷消滅! 地獄の使者スカルサタモン)	February 9, 2003	July 6, 2003
44	"Now You See It, Now You Don't" ("Fight together~ Kouji's Vow"); Transliteration: "Tomoni Tatakae! Kōji no Chikai" (Japanese: 共に戦え! 輝二の誓い)	February 16, 2003	July 7, 2003
45	"All Aboard the Tag Team Express" ("The Data of Operation! Defend Akiba Market"); Transliteration: "Dēta Kakuran Sakusen! Akiba Māketto o Bōei Seyo" (Japanese: データかく乱作戦! アキバマーケットを防衛せよ)	February 23, 2003	July 8, 2003
46	"To Make the World Go Away" ("Annihilation of the Digital World!? Lucemon's Rule of Darkness""); Transliteration: "Dejitaru Wārudo Shōmetsu!? Rūchemon Ankoku Shihai" (Japanese: デジタルワールド消滅!? ルーチェモン暗黒支配)	March 2, 2003	July 9, 2003
47	"When Knights Fall..." ("The Royal Knights Disperse – And then...!!"); Transliteration: "Roiyaru Naitsu Chiru, Soshite..." (Japanese: ロイヤルナイツ散る そして...!!)	March 9, 2003	July 10, 2003
48	"The Brothers Yin and Yang" ("Turn Light and Darkness into One! Kouichi's Last Wish"); Transliteration: "Hikari to Yami o Hitotsu ni! Kōichi Saigo no Negai" (Japanese: 光と闇を一つに! 輝一最後の願い)	March 16, 2003	July 11, 2003
49	"Lucemon on the Loose" ("Fight, Susanoomon – Lucemon Reaches the Human World"); Transliteration: "Tatakae Susanoomon, Rūchemon Ningenkai Tōtasu!!" (Japanese: 戦えスサノオモン ルーチェモン人間界到達!!)	March 23, 2003	July 13, 2003
50	"End of the Line" ("Go Beyond Time! A New Legend's Start"); Transliteration: "Toki o Koete! Arata na Densetsu no Hajimari" (Japanese: 時を越えて! 新たな伝説の始まり)	March 30, 2003	July 14, 2003

=== Season 5: Digimon Data Squad (Digimon Savers) (2006–07) ===
No.	Title	Original release date	English air date
1	"There Are Monsters Among Us" ("I am Masaru! Cockatrimon Strikes"); Transliteration: "Ore ga Masaru da! Kokatorimon Shūrai" (Japanese: 俺が大だ!コカトリモン襲来)	April 2, 2006	October 1, 2007
2	"Marcus' Inner Strength" ("Burn, the Digisoul of Anger - The Flymon that Lurks in Darkness"); Transliteration: "Moero Ikari no Deji-sōru, Yami ni Hisomu Furaimon"" (Japanese: 燃えろ怒りのデジソウル 闇にひそむフライモン)	April 9, 2006	October 5, 2007
3	"The Return of Thomas!" ("Genius Tohma has Returned! Beat Meramon"); Transliteration: "Kaette Kita Tensai Tohma! Meramon wo Buttobase" (Japanese: 帰ってきた天才トーマ!メラモンをぶっとばせ)	April 16, 2006	October 8, 2007
4	"The New Team of Marcus and Thomas!" ("The New Team's First Outing! Pursuit Drimogemon!"); Transliteration: "Shin-Chīmu Hatsu-shutsudō! Dorimogemon wo Oe!" (Japanese: 新チーム初出動!ドリモゲモンを追え!)	April 23, 2006	October 15, 2007
5	"Digital World, Here We Come!" ("Rushing into the Digital World! Drimogemon's Trap"); Transliteration: "Dejitaru-wārudo Totsunyū! Dorimogemon no Wana" (Japanese: デジタルワールド突入! ドリモゲモンの罠)	April 30, 2006	October 22, 2007
6	"The Ultimate Team No More?" ("The Masaru-Agumon Combo Terminated?! Gale, Garurumon"); Transliteration: "Masaru Agumon Konbi Kaishō!? Shippū Garurumon" (Japanese: 大・アグモンコンビ解消!? 疾風ガルルモン)	May 7, 2006	October 29, 2007
7	"A Birthday Kristy Will Never Forget...." ("Tohma's Day off - Explosion, Bomber Nanimon"); Transliteration: "Tohma no Kyūjitsu, Bonbā-nanimon" (Japanese: トーマの休日 爆裂ボンバーナニモン)	May 14, 2006	November 5, 2007
8	"The Singer's Secret" ("Yoshino Gets Her Cinderella Story?! Chrysalimon's Shadow"); Transliteration: "Yoshino Tama-no-koshi Getto!? Kurisarimon no Kage" (Japanese: ヨシノ玉の輿ゲット!? クリサリモンの影)	May 21, 2006	November 12, 2007
9	"Never Meet Your Heroes" ("Tohma's Inglorious Battle - Secret Maneuvers, Togemon"); Transliteration: "Tohma Eikō Naki Tatakai, An'yaku Togemon" (Japanese: トーマ栄光なき戦い 暗躍トゲモン)	May 28, 2006	November 19, 2007
10	"Curse This Curse: Marcus' Bad Day" ("Masaru's Worst Day in His Life - Prankster Soulmon"); Transliteration: "Masaru Jinsei Saiaku no Hi, Itazura Sōrumon" (Japanese: マサル人生最悪の日 いたずらソウルモン)	June 4, 2006	November 26, 2007
11	"The Vile of Vilemon!" ("Recover the Bond between Parent and Child - Evilmon's Bewitchment"); Transliteration: "Oyako no Kizuna wo Torimodose, Ibirumon no Genwaku" (Japanese: 親子の絆を取り戻せ イビルモンの幻惑)	June 18, 2006	December 3, 2007
12	"The Digi-egg That Fell to Earth" ("I Will Protect Chika! Biyomon's Resolve"); Transliteration: "Chika wa Boku ga Mamoru! Piyomon no Ketsui" (Japanese: 知香はボクが守る! ピヨモンの決意)	June 25, 2006	December 10, 2007
13	"The Rise of RiseGreymon" ("Masaru's New Power - Evolve! RiseGreymon"); Transliteration: "Masaru Aratanaru Chikara, Shinka! Raizu-gureimon" (Japanese: マサル新たなる力 進化!ライズグレイモン)	July 2, 2006	December 17, 2007
14	"The Wild Boy of the Digital World" ("Digimon Boy Ikuto - Forest Guardian, Jureimon"); Transliteration: "Dejimon Shōnen Ikuto, Mori no Ban'nin Jureimon" (Japanese: デジモン少年イクト 森の番人ジュレイモン)	July 9, 2006	January 7, 2008
15	"The Gorge of Deception!" ("Recollections of my Mother - Howl, MachGaogamon"); Transliteration: "Kāsan no Omoide, Hoero Mahha-gaogamon" (Japanese: 母さんの想い出 吠えろマッハガオガモン)	July 23, 2006	January 14, 2008
16	"Falcomon: Friend or Foe?" ("The Ally is Falcomon?! Violent! Blossomon"); Transliteration: "Nakama wa Farukomon!? Mōretsu! Burossamon" (Japanese: 仲間はファルコモン!? モーレツ! ブロッサモン)	July 30, 2006	January 28, 2008
17	"Yoshi's Biggest Battle: The One With Herself" ("The Singing Voice that Calls Upon a Miracle - The Lilamon Evolution"); Transliteration: "Kiseki wo Yobu Utagoe, Rairamon Shinka" (Japanese: 奇跡を呼ぶ歌声 ライラモン進化)	August 6, 2006	February 4, 2008
18	"The Clash With Merukimon!" ("The DATS Team Annihilated?! Clash, Mercurimon"); Transliteration: "Dattsu-chīmu Zenmetsu!? Gekitotsu Merukurimon" (Japanese: DATSチーム全滅!? 激突メルクリモン)	August 13, 2006	February 11, 2008
19	"The Truth About Keenan" ("The Target is Ikuto!? Gotsumon's Plot"); Transliteration: "Hyōteki wa Ikuto!? Gotsumon no Takurami" (Japanese: 標的はイクト!?ゴツモンの企み)	August 20, 2006	February 18, 2008
20	"The Crier Family Reunion" ("Rescue Mother, Ikuto - Hagurumon's Cage"); Transliteration: "Hahaoya wo Sukue, Ikuto, Hagurumon no Ori" (Japanese: 母親を救え、イクト ハグルモンの檻)	August 27, 2006	February 25, 2008
21	"The Digimon Army Makes Its Move" ("Big Panic in the Human World - The Digimon Army Advances"); Transliteration: "Ningen-kai Dai-panikku, Dejimon Gundan Shingeki" (Japanese: 人間界大パニック デジモン軍団進撃)	September 3, 2006	March 3, 2008
22	"The Wrath of SaberLeomon" ("Defeat the Ultimate Level! The Anger Wave of Saber Leomon"); Transliteration: "Taose Kyūkyoku-tai! Dotō Sāberu-reomon" (Japanese: 倒せ究極体! 怒涛サーベルレオモン)	September 10, 2006	March 10, 2008
23	"One More Digital Dive" ("Once More, To the Digital World - Insekimon's Great Rampage"); Transliteration: "Futatabi, Dejitaru-wārudo e, Insekimon Ōabare" (Japanese: 再び、デジタルワールドへ インセキモン大暴れ)	September 17, 2006	March 24, 2008
24	"The Past Revealed" ("The Revealed Past - Heartless! Gizmon: AT"); Transliteration: "Akasareru Kako, Hijō! Gizumon Ē-Tī" (Japanese: 明かされる過去 非情!ギズモン: ΑT)	September 24, 2006	March 31, 2008
25	"Kurata's Revenge" ("Smash Kurata's Ambition - Flight, Yatagaramon"); Transliteration: "Kurata no Yabō wo Kudake, Hishō Yatagaramon" (Japanese: 倉田の野望をくだけ 飛翔ヤタガラモン)	October 1, 2006	April 7, 2008
26	"Memory Is The First Thing To Go!" ("Masaru's Memory is Erased - The Lost Bond"); Transliteration: "Masaru Kioku Shōkyo, Ushinawareta Kizuna" (Japanese: マサル記憶消去 失われた絆)	October 8, 2006	April 14, 2008
27	"The Beginning of the End!" ("Chase Kurata - The Operation of Digimon Extermination Begins!"); Transliteration: "Kurata wo Oe, Dejimon Sen'metsu Sakusen Kaishi!" (Japanese: 倉田を追え・デジモン殲滅作戦開始!)	October 15, 2006	April 21, 2008
28	"Digivice Meltdown!" ("Evolution is Impossible! The Digivices Break Down"); Transliteration: "Shinka Fukanō! Dejivaisu Hōkai" (Japanese: 進化不可能!デジヴァイス崩壊)	October 22, 2006	April 28, 2008
29	"How to Fix a Broken Digivice" ("Resurrecting Digivices - A New Brilliance"); Transliteration: "Yomigaeru Dejivaisu, Aratanaru Kagayaki" (Japanese: よみがえるデジヴァイス・新たなる輝き)	October 29, 2006	May 5, 2008
30	"Journey to the Sacred City" ("An Imprisoned Masaru - The Holy City's Trap"); Transliteration: "Toraware no Masaru, Seinaru To no Wana" (Japanese: とらわれの大 聖なる都の罠)	November 5, 2006	May 12, 2008
31	"Showdown Between Geniuses: Thomas vs. Nanami!" ("Genius Showdown! Tohma vs. Nanami"); Transliteration: "Tensai Taiketsu! Tōma tai Nanami" (Japanese: 天才対決!トーマVSナナミ)	November 12, 2006	May 19, 2008
32	"The Sacred City's Last Stand!" ("Fiercely Attack Kurata's Army Corps - Protect the Holy City"); Transliteration: "Mōkō Kurata Gundan, Seinaru To o Mamore" (Japanese: 猛攻倉田軍団 聖なる都を守れ)	November 19, 2006	June 16, 2008
33	"The Final Bio-Hybrid Battle!" ("The Final Decisive Battle! Kouki, Ultimate Evolution"); Transliteration: "Saigo no Kessen! Kōki, Kyūkyoku Shinka" (Japanese: 最後の決戦!聖、究極進化)	November 26, 2006	June 23, 2008
34	"The Norstein Family Secret" ("The Day of Parting - The Strongest Enemy: Tohma!"); Transliteration: "Ketsubetsu no Hi, Saikyō no Teki Tōma!" (Japanese: 訣別の日 最強の敵・トーマ!)	December 3, 2006	June 30, 2008
35	"Kurata's Real Plan" ("The Power of Destruction - ShineGreymon Runs Wild"); Transliteration: "Hametsu no Pawā, Shaingureimon Bōsō" (Japanese: 破滅のパワー シャイングレイモン暴走)	December 10, 2006	July 7, 2008
36	"Awaken Belphemon" ("Demon Lord Belphemon Revives"); Transliteration: "Maō Berufemon Fukkatsu" (Japanese: 魔王ベルフェモン復活)	December 17, 2006	July 14, 2008
37	"The Battle With Belphemon" ("Awaken, Agumon - Defeat Belphemon!"); Transliteration: "Mezameyo Agumon, Berufemon o Taose!" (Japanese: 目覚めよアグモン ベルフェモンを倒せ!)	December 24, 2006	July 21, 2008
38	"The Power of the Burst Mode" ("Burst Mode - The Power that Exceeds Ultimate"); Transliteration: "Bāsuto Mōdo, Kyūkyoku o Koeru Chikara" (Japanese: バーストモード 究極を超える力)	January 7, 2007	July 28, 2008
39	"King Drasil's Fatal Decision" ("Human World Terminated! Yggdrasil's Decision"); Transliteration: "Ningenkai Shōmetsu! Igudorashiru no Ketsudan" (Japanese: 人間界消滅!イグドラシルの決断)	January 14, 2007	August 4, 2008
40	"The Royal Knights Assemble" ("The Strongest Order of Knights - The Royal Knights Gather"); Transliteration: "Saikyō Kishidan: Roiyaru Naitsu Shūketsu" (Japanese: 最強騎士団・ロイヤルナイツ集結)	January 21, 2007	August 11, 2008
41	"Father and Son Destiny" ("Confirm it with a Fist! Thoughts of My Father"); Transliteration: "Kobushi de Tashikamero! Tōsan no Omoi" (Japanese: 拳でたしかめろ!父さんの想い)	January 28, 2007	August 18, 2008
42	"Thomas Bursts on the Scene!" ("Toma's Determined Burst Mode"); Transliteration: "Tōma Ketsui no Bāsuto Mōdo" (Japanese: トーマ決意のバーストモード)	February 4, 2007	October 4, 2008
43	"Justice Equals Power!" ("Indeed Strength is Justice! Beast Knight Duftmon"); Transliteration: "Chikara Koso Seigi! Jūkishi Dufutomon" (Japanese: 力こそ正義!獣騎士ドゥフトモン)	February 11, 2007	October 5, 2008
44	"Human Potential" ("Break! Craniummon's Strongest Shield"); Transliteration: "Kudake! Kureniamumon no Saikyō no Tate" (Japanese: 砕け!クレニアムモンの最強の盾)	February 25, 2007	October 11, 2008
45	"A Family Quarrel!" ("The One-on-One Match Between Men! Masaru vs. Suguru"); Transliteration: "Otoko to Otoko no Taiman Shōbu! Masaru tai Suguru" (Japanese: 男と男のタイマン勝負!大VS英)	March 4, 2007	October 12, 2008
46	"The Truth About BanchoLeomon" ("Impact! The Truth About Bantiyou Leomon"); Transliteration: "Shōgeki! Banchōreomo no Shinjitsu" (Japanese: 衝撃!バンチョーレオモンの真実)	March 11, 2007	October 25, 2008
47	"The Data Squad's Final Battle!" ("Protect the Future! DATS' Final Battle"); Transliteration: "Mirai o Mamore! Dattsu Saigo no Tatakai" (Japanese: 未来を守れ! DATS最後の戦い)	March 18, 2007	October 26, 2008
48	"The Ultimate Farewell!" ("A Complete Conclusion! Farewell, Leader of Fights"); Transliteration: "Kanzen Ketchaku! Saraba Kenka Banchō" (Japanese: 完全決着!さらばケンカ番長)	March 25, 2007	November 1, 2008

=== Season 6: Digimon Fusion (Digimon Xros Wars) (2010–12) ===
No.	English Title/Original Japanese title	Directed by	Written by	Original release date	American air date
1	"Mikey Goes to Another World!" ("Taiki, Go to Another World!"); Transliteration: "Taiki, Isekai e Yuku!" (Japanese: タイキ、異世界へ行く！)	Tetsuya Endō	Riku Sanjō	July 6, 2010	September 7, 2013
2	"He is Shoutmon, Hear Him Roar!" ("Shoutmon, Roar!"); Transliteration: "Shautomon, Hoeru!" (Japanese: シャウ卜モン、吠える！)	Yukio Kaizawa	Riku Sanjō	July 13, 2010	September 14, 2013
3	"A Rival Appears" ("Rival Kiriha, Appear!"); Transliteration: "Raibaru Kiriha, Arawaru!" (Japanese: 強敵キリハ、現る！)	Hiroyuki Kakudō	Riku Sanjō	July 20, 2010	October 5, 2013
4	"Island Zone in Chaos!" ("Island Zone, Upheaval!"); Transliteration: "Airando Zōn, Gekidō!" (Japanese: アイランドゾーン、激動！)	Masahiro Hosoda	Reiko Yoshida	July 27, 2010	October 13, 2013
5	"Thanks for the DigiCards!" ("Digimemory, Shine!"); Transliteration: "Dejimemori, Kagayaku!" (Japanese: デジメモリ、輝く！)	Hiroki Shibata	Reiko Yoshida	August 3, 2010	October 20, 2013
6	"Crisis or Conquest" ("X4, Crisis Breakthrough!"); Transliteration: "Kurosu Fō, Kiki Toppa!" (Japanese: ×4, 危機突破！)	Toshiaki Komura	Reiko Yoshida	August 10, 2010	October 27, 2013
7	"Danger Erupts!" ("Volcano Digimon, Explosion!"); Transliteration: "Kazan Dejimon, Daibakuhatsu!" (Japanese: 火山デジモン、大爆発！)	Yutaka Tsuchida	Shōji Yonemura	August 17, 2010	November 3, 2013
8	"Meltdown in the Magma Zone!" ("Fierce General Tactimon, Close In!"); Transliteration: "Mōshō Takutimon, Semaru!" (Japanese: 猛将タクティモン、迫る！)	Kōhei Kureta	Shōji Yonemura	August 24, 2010	November 5, 2013
9	"Dorulumon's True Colors!" ("Dorulumon, Run Like the Wind!"); Transliteration: "Dorurumon, Kaze ni Kakeru!" (Japanese: ドルルモン、風に駆ける！)	Hiroyuki Kakudō	Shōji Yonemura	August 31, 2010	November 10, 2013
10	"The Rival Champions!" ("Taiki, Become a Knight!"); Transliteration: "Taiki, Kishi ni Naru!" (Japanese: タイキ、騎士になる！)	Masato Mitsuka	Riku Sanjō	September 14, 2010	November 17, 2013
11	"Ice to See You, Angie!" ("Xros Heart, Burn!"); Transliteration: "Kurosu Hāto, Moeru!" (Japanese: クロスハート、燃える！)	Yukio Kaizawa	Riku Sanjō	September 14, 2010	November 24, 2013
12	"Treasure, Traps and Trouble – Oh My!" ("Sand Zone, A Great Adventure in the Ruins!"); Transliteration: "Sando Zōn, Iseki de Daibōuken!" (Japanese: サンドゾーン、遺跡で大冒険！)	Tetsuya Endō	Shōji Yonemura	October 12, 2010	December 1, 2013
13	"Mikey, Warrior of the Light!" ("Taiki, Warrior of the Goddess!"); Transliteration: "Taiki, Megami no Senshi!" (Japanese: タイキ、女神の戦士！)	Masahiro Hosoda	Mitsumi Ito	October 19, 2010	December 8, 2013
14	"Showdown in the Sand Zone" ("The Warrior Beelzebumon, Dances!"); Transliteration: "Senshi Beruzebumon, Mau!" (Japanese: 戦士ベルゼブモン、舞う！)	Yukio Kaizawa; Masato Mitsuka	Hitoshi Tanaka	October 26, 2010	December 15, 2013
15	"Trouble in Paradise" ("Heaven Zone, The Trap of Paradise!"); Transliteration: "Hebun Zōn, Rakuen no Wana!" (Japanese: ヘブンゾーン、楽園の罠！)	Hiroki Shibata	Reiko Yoshida	November 9, 2010	December 22, 2013
16	"A Dark Cloud Over the Sky Zone" ("The Dark Knight Digimon Arrives!"); Transliteration: "Kurokishi Dejimon, Sanjō!" (Japanese: 黒騎士デジモン、参上！)	Hiroyuki Kakudō	Kenta Ishii	November 16, 2010	February 17, 2014
17	"Clash in the Clouds" ("The Miraculous DigiXros! Shoutmon X5 Flies!"); Transliteration: "Kiseki no Dejikurosu! Shautomon Kurosu Faibu Tobu!" (Japanese: 奇跡のデジクロス！シャウトモン×5飛ぶ！)	Yutaka Tsuchida	Daisuke Kihara	November 23, 2010	February 17, 2014
18	"Welcome to the Jungle Zone!" ("Stingmon, the Great Digimon Forest's Hero"); Transliteration: "Sutingumon, Dejimon Dai Mitsurin no Yūsha" (Japanese: スティングモン、デジモン大密林の勇者)	Yōko Ikeda	Riku Sanjō	November 30, 2010	February 23, 2014
19	"Rumble in the Jungle Zone!" ("The Legendary Deckerdramon, Moves!"); Transliteration: "Densetsu no Dekkādoramon, Ugoku!" (Japanese: 伝説のデッカードラモン、動く！)	Masato Mitsuka	Riku Sanjō	December 7, 2010	March 2, 2014
20	"Train of Terror!" ("Dust Zone, Grand Locomon's Big Scrap City!"); Transliteration: "Dasuto Zōn, Gurandorocomon no Dai Sukurappu Toshi!" (Japanese: ダストゾーン、グランドロコモンの大スクラップ都市！)	Yukio Kaizawa	Shouji Yonemura	December 14, 2010	March 9, 2014
21	"Disaster in the Dust Zone!" ("Decisive Battle! DarkKnightmon VS Xros Heart!"); Transliteration: "Kessen! Dākunaitomon VS Kurosu Hāto!" (Japanese: 決戦！ダークナイトモンVSクロスハート！)	Hiroyuki Kakudō	Shouji Yonemura	December 21, 2010	March 16, 2014
22	"Lost in Digital Space" ("Wisemon, the Secrets of the Digital World!"); Transliteration: "Waizumon, Dejitaru Wārudo no Himitsu!" (Japanese: ワイズモン、デジタルワールドの秘密！)	Toshiaki Komura	Riku Sanjō	January 11, 2011	March 23, 2014
23	"Laughing All the Way to the Code Crown" ("Shinobi Zone, The Comical Ninja Battle!"); Transliteration: "Shinobi Zōn, Owarai Ninja Batoru!" (Japanese: シノビゾーン、お笑い忍者バトル！)	Masahiro Hosoda	Reiko Yoshida	January 18, 2011	March 30, 2014
24	"Monitamission Impossible!" ("Dropout Monitamons, Do Your Best!); Transliteration: "Ochikobore Monitamonzu, Ganbaru!" (Japanese: 落ちこぼれモニタモンズ、がんばる！)	Hiroki Shibata	Reiko Yoshida	January 25, 2011	April 6, 2014
25	"Showdown in Shaky Town!" ("Zone Collapses! Sparks Fly Between Taiki and Kiriha!"); Transliteration: "Zōn Hōkai! Hibana Chiru Taiki to Kiriha!" (Japanese: ゾーン崩壊！火花散るタイキとキリハ！)	Yutaka Tsuchida	Riku Sanjō	February 1, 2011	June 1, 2014
26	"Shoutmon – Bogus King or the Real Thing?" ("Shoutmon, Proof of a King!"); Transliteration: "Shautomon, Kingu no Akashi!" (Japanese: シャウトモン、キングの証！)	Hiroyuki Kakudō	Riku Sanjō	February 8, 2011	June 1, 2014
27	"Sweet Zone Bake-Off!" ("Sweets Zone, Sweet Tooth Digimon Battle"); Transliteration: "Suītsu Zōn, Amatō Dejimon Batoru" (Japanese: スイーツゾーン, 甘党デジモンバトル)	Masato Mitsuka	Shouji Yonemura	February 15, 2011	June 8, 2014
28	"Battle in the Digital Depths" ("The Ultimate Weapon Active! Hang in there Cutemon!"); Transliteration: "Saishū Heiki Hatsudō! Ganbare Kyūtomon!" (Japanese: 最終兵器発動！がんばれキュートモン！)	Yukio Kaizawa	Shouji Yonemura	February 22, 2011	June 8, 2014
29	"Fall of the Final Code Crown" ("Taiki & Kiriha VS the Bagra Army, a Complete Showdown!"); Transliteration: "Taiki Kiriha VS Bagura Gun, Zenmen Kessen!" (Japanese: タイキ・キリハVSバグラ軍、全面決戦！)	Masahiro Hosoda	Riku Sanjō	March 1, 2011	June 15, 2014
30	"When Worlds Collide" ("Brand New Journey!! Tokyo Showdown!!"); Transliteration: "Arata Naru Tabidachi!! Tōkyō Daikessen!" (Japanese: 新たなる旅立ち！！東京大決戦！！)	Masato Mitsuka	Riku Sanjō	March 8, 2011	June 15, 2014

No. overall	No. in season	English Title/Original Japanese title	Directed by	Written by	Original release date	American air date
31	1	"Back to the Digital World! Hot Time in Dragonland!" ("Towards a New World! The Blazing General of Dragon Land"); Transliteration: "Arata Naru Sekai e! Karetsu Shōgun no Doragon Rando" (Japanese: 新たなる世界へ！火烈将軍のドラゴンランド)	Tetsuya Endo	Riku Sanjo	April 5, 2011	March 8, 2015
32	2	"Take a Stand, Christopher! Fusion Fighters' Rescue Mission!" ("Stand Up, Kiriha! Xros Heart's Rescue Strategy"); Transliteration: "Tachiagare Kiriha! Kurosu Hāto Dakkai Sakusen" (Japanese: 立ち上がれキリハ！クロスハート奪回作戰)	Tetsuya Endo	Riku Sanjo	April 12, 2011	March 8, 2015
33	3	"Vampire Land and the Moonlight General" ("Feel a Chill Run Down your Spine! The Moonlight General's Vampire Land"); Transliteration: "Sesuji Zowazowa! Gekkō Shōgun no Vanpaia Rando" (Japanese: 背筋ゾワゾワ！月光将軍のヴァンパイアランド)	Tetsuya Endo	Shouji Yonemura	April 19, 2011	March 15, 2015
34	4	"Hang on, Greymon! The Rise of Shoutmon DX" ("Don't Die Greymon! Shoutmon DX is Born"); Transliteration: "Shinu na Gureimon! Shautomon Dī Kurosu Tanjō" (Japanese: 死ぬなグレイモン！シャウトモンDX誕生)	Tetsuya Endo	Shouji Yonemura	April 26, 2011	March 15, 2015
35	5	"The Power Drain: The Hunters of Honeyland" ("The Power is Absorbed! The Hunters of Honey Land"); Transliteration: "Pawā ga Suwareru! Hanī Rando no Kariudo-tachi" (Japanese: パワーが吸われる！ハニーランドの狩人たち)	Tetsuya Endo	Reiko Yoshida	May 3, 2011	March 22, 2015
36	6	"Sweet Revenge! The Horrors of Honeyland!" ("The Laughing Hunter! General Zamielmon the Wood-Spirit"); Transliteration: "Warau Kariudo! Mokusei Shougun Zamiērumon" (Japanese: 笑う狩人！木精将軍ザミエールモン)	Tetsuya Endo	Reiko Yoshida	May 10, 2011	March 22, 2015
37	7	"Ewan and the Land of Illusion" ("Brother, Why!? The Nightmarish Enemy, General Yuu"); Transliteration: "Otōto yo, Naze!? Teki Jeneraru Yuu no Akumu" (Japanese: 弟よ、なぜ！？ 敵ジェネラル・ユウの悪夢)	Tetsuya Endo	Riku Sanjo	May 17, 2011	March 29, 2015
38	8	"Psyche-Out in Cyberland!" ("The Mysterious Cyber Land! The Beauty of Fullmetal City"); Transliteration: "Nazo no Saibā Rando! Hagane no Machi no Bishōjo" (Japanese: 謎のサイバーランド！鋼の街の美少女)	Tetsuya Endo	Shoji Yonemura	May 24, 2011	March 29, 2015
39	9	"The Water Tiger's Slippery Trap!" ("Xros Heart Break up Crisis! Water Tiger General's Despicable Trap"); Transliteration: "Kurosu Hāto Bunretsu no Kiki! Suiko Shōgun no Hiretsuna Wana" (Japanese: クロスハート分裂の危機！水虎将軍の卑劣なワナ)	Tetsuya Endo	Shoji Yonemura	May 31, 2011	April 5, 2015
40	10	"Gold Land and the Irate Pirate!" ("Cheerful Pirates Appear! Set Sail for Gold Land!!"); Transliteration: "Yōki na Kaizoku, Arawaru! Gōrudo Rando no Kōkai!!" (Japanese: 陽気な海賊、現る！ゴールドランドの航海！！)	Tetsuya Endo	Riku Sanjo	June 7, 2011	April 5, 2015
41	11	"Ballistamon's Bad News Blast From the Past!" ("Olegmon the Gold Thief Laughs! Farewell Xros Heart!"); Transliteration: "Kinzoku no Orēgumon ga Warau! Saraba Kurosu Hāto!" (Japanese: 金賊のオレーグモンが笑う！ さらばクロスハート！)	Tetsuya Endo	Riku Sanjo	June 14, 2011	April 5, 2015
42	12	"Deep Trouble in Canyon Land!" ("Whispering to Kiriha! Earth-god General of the Canyon, The Devil's Invitation!"); Transliteration: "Kiriha ni Sasayaku! Kyōkoku no Doshin Shōgun, Akuma no Yūi!" (Japanese: キリハにささやく！峡谷の土神将軍、魔の誘い！)	Tetsuya Endo	Shouji Yonemura	June 21, 2011	July 5, 2015
43	13	"Great Fusion! The Power of Friendship" ("The Mighty Love! Deckerdramon's Final Scream!!"); Transliteration: "Tsuyoki Ai o! Dekkādoramon Saigo no Sakebi!!" (Japanese: 強き愛を！デッカードラモン最期の叫び！！)	Tetsuya Endo	Shouji Yonemura	July 4, 2011	July 5, 2015
44	14	"Regeneration Frustration!" ("The Bond of X7! The Sublime Battle with Gravimon!!"); Transliteration: "Kizuna no Kurosu Sebun! Gurabimon no Sōzetsu Batoru!!" (Japanese: きずなの×7！グラビモンとの壮絶バトル！！)	Tetsuya Endo	Reiko Yoshida	July 11, 2011	July 12, 2015
45	15	"Dark Side of the Sun" ("The Final Kingdom, the Shining Sun of Bright Land!"); Transliteration: "Saigo no Ōkoku, Kagayaku Taiyō no Buraito Rando!" (Japanese: 最後の王園、輝く太陽のブライトランド！)	Tetsuya Endo	Riku Sanjo	July 18, 2011	July 12, 2015
46	16	"The Dark Side of Bright Land" ("Dead or Alive, the Hellish General's Decisive Battle!"); Transliteration: "Shō ka Shi ka, Jigoku no Jeneraru Kessen!" (Japanese: 生か死か、地獄のジェネラル決戦！)	Tetsuya Endo	Riku Sanjo	July 25, 2011	July 19, 2015
47	17	"The Battle of the Young Generals" ("Taiki VS. Yuu! Showdown of the Boy Generals!!"); Transliteration: "Taiki vs Yuu! Shōnen Jeneraru Taiketsu!!" (Japanese: タイキvsユウ、少年ジェネラル対決！！)	Tetsuya Endo	Riku Sanjo	August 9, 2011	July 19, 2015
48	18	"Beelzemon's Revenge" ("Beelzebumon, Fade into Light!"); Transliteration: "Beruzebumon, Hikari ni Kiyu!" (Japanese: ベルゼブモン、光に消ゆ！)	Tetsuya Endo	Riku Sanjo	August 16, 2011	July 26, 2015
49	19	"The Darkest Dark General of All!" ("Taiki's Decision! Surpass the Strongest Apollomon!"); Transliteration: "Taiki no Keddan! Saikyō no Aporomon o Koeru!" (Japanese: タイキの決断！最強のアポロモンを超えろ！)	Tetsuya Endo	Riku Sanjo	August 23, 2011	July 26, 2015
50	20	"Prison Land" ("Resurrect! The Appearance of all Seven Death Generals!"); Transliteration: "Yomigaeru! Shichinin no Desu Jeneraru Sōtōjō!!" (Japanese: よみがえる！七人のデスジェネラル総登場！！)	Tetsuya Endo	Shouji Yonemura	August 30, 2011	August 2, 2015
51	21	"Rotten To The Digi-Core!" ("For the Future of the Digital World! The Friendship with the Death Generals!"); Transliteration: "Dejitaru Wārudo no Mirai no Tame ni! Desu Jeneraru to no Yūjō!" (Japanese: デジタルワールドの未来のために！デスジェネラルとの友情！)	Tetsuya Endo	Shouji Yonemura	September 6, 2011	August 2, 2015
52	22	"D5 and the Brotherhood of Evil" ("Bagra Brothers! The Bond of Evil"); Transliteration: "Bagura Kyōdai! Ankoku no Kizuna" (Japanese: バグラ兄弟、暗黒の絆)	Tetsuya Endo	Riku Sanjo	September 13, 2011	August 9, 2015
53	23	"The Darkness Before the Dawn" ("It Approaches! The Human World's Doomsday, D5"); Transliteration: "Semarikuru! Ningenkai no Saigo no Hi, Dī Faibu!!" (Japanese: 迫りくる！人間界の最期の日、D5！！)	Tetsuya Endo	Riku Sanjo	September 20, 2011	August 9, 2015
54	24	"Final Fusion – The Fight for Earth!" ("Grab the DigiXros of Glory! Our Future!"); Transliteration: "Eikō no DejiKurosu, Tsukame! Oretachi no Mirai!!" (Japanese: 栄光のデジクロス、つかめ！おれたちの未来！！)	Tetsuya Endo	Riku Sanjo	September 27, 2011	August 16, 2015

No. overall	No. in season	Title	Directed by	Written by	Original release date
55	1	("We, the Digimon Hunters!"); Transliteration: "Oretachi, Dejimon Hantā!" (Japanese: おれたち、デジモンハンター!)	Unknown	Riku Sanjo	October 4, 2011
56	2	("The Students Disappear! The Wavering Shadow of Sagomon"); Transliteration: "Seito-tachi ga Kieta! Yurameku Sagomon no Kage" (Japanese: 生徒たちが消えた！ゆらめくサゴモンの影)	Unknown	Riku Sanjo	October 11, 2011
57	3	("The Robot Club's Dream, Pinocchimon's Enticement"); Transliteration: "Robotto Bu no Yume, Pinokimon no Yūwaku" (Japanese: ロボット部の夢、ピノッキモンの誘惑)	Unknown	Shōji Yonemura	October 18, 2011
58	4	("The Targeted Honor Students! Blossomon's Smile"); Transliteration: "Yūtōsei ga Nerawareta! Burossamon no Bishō" (Japanese: 優等生が狙われた！ブロッサモンの微笑)	Unknown	Isao Murayama	October 25, 2011
59	5	("Cuteness Causion! Cute Hunter, Airu's Trap!"); Transliteration: "Kawaii Yōchūi! Kyūto Hantā, Airu no Wana!" (Japanese: かわいさ要注意！キュートハンター、アイルの罠！)	Unknown	Riku Sanjo	November 1, 2011
60	6	("Digimon Kendo Match! Approaching the Blade of Kotemon!"); Transliteration: "Dejimon Kendō Shōbu! Kotemon no Yaiba ga Semaru!" (Japanese: デジモン剣道勝負！コテモンの刃が迫る！)	Unknown	Shōji Yonemura	November 8, 2011
61	7	("The Okonomiyaki Panic! The Town Full of Pagumon"); Transliteration: "Okonomiyaki Panikku! Pagumon Darake no Machi" (Japanese: お好み焼きパニック！パグモンだらけの街)	Unknown	Reiko Yoshida	November 15, 2011
62	8	("Business is Booming For The Digimon Hunt! The Shopping District's Master Hunter!"); Transliteration: "Degimon Hanto Daihanjō! Shōtengai no Sugoude Hantā!" (Japanese: デジモンハント大繁盛！商店街の凄腕ハンター！)	Unknown	Isao Murayama	November 22, 2011
63	9	("Taiki Is Targeted! The Super Celebrity Star's Brave Shout!"); Transliteration: "Nerawareta Taiki! Chō Serebu Sutā no Otakebi!" (Japanese: 狙われたタイキ！超セレブ・スターの雄たけび！)	Unknown	Riku Sanjo	November 29, 2011
64	10	("Going to Hong Kong! Protect the Super Beauty Idol!!"); Transliteration: "Honkon Jōriku! Chōbishōjo Aidoru o Mamore!!" (Japanese: 香港上陸！超美少女アイドルを守れ！！)	Unknown	Shōji Yonemura	December 6, 2011
65	11	("Tagiru Turns Soft?! Gumdramon's Big Crisis!!"); Transliteration: "Tagiru ga Funyafunya!? Gamudoramon Dai Pinchi!!" (Japanese: タギルがふにゃふにゃ!? ガムドラモン大ピンチ!!)	Unknown	Isao Murayama	December 13, 2011
66	12	("Delicious or Nasty? The Digimon Ramen Contest!"); Transliteration: "Oishii? Mazui? Dejimon Rāmen Shōbu!" (Japanese: おいしい？まずい？デジモン・ラーメン勝負！)	Unknown	Shōji Yonemura	December 20, 2011
67	13	("The World Trip for Children only! The Digimon Train of Dreams"); Transliteration: "Kodomo dake no Sekai Ryokō! Yume no Dejimon Torein" (Japanese: 子供だけの世界旅行！夢のデジモントレイン)	Unknown	Reiko Yoshida	December 27, 2011
68	14	("Gather Hunters! Digimon Competition in the Southern Island!"); Transliteration: "Hantā Daishūgō! Minami no Shima no Dejimon Sōdatsusen!" (Japanese: ハンター大集合！南の島のデジモン争奪戦！)	Unknown	Riku Sanjo	January 3, 2012
69	15	("Want Friends? Phelesmon, the Devil's Promise"); Transliteration: "Tomodachi Hoshii? Feresumon, Akuma no Yakusoku" (Japanese: 友達欲しい？フェレスモン悪魔の約束)	Unknown	Auichi Mio	January 10, 2012
70	16	("Heart Racing Fear Experience! The Spirit Hunter Bellows!!"); Transliteration: "Dokidoki Kyōfu Taiken! Shinrei Hantā ga Hoeru!!" (Japanese: ドキドキ恐怖体験！心霊ハンターが吠える！！)	Unknown	Shōji Yonemura	January 17, 2012
71	17	("Resemblance or None at All? The Disguised Phantom Thief Betsumon"); Transliteration: "Niteru? Nitenai? Hensō Kaitō Betsumon" (Japanese: 似てる？似てない？変装怪盗ベツモン)	Unknown	Riku Sanjo	January 24, 2012
72	18	("UFO & Dinosaur Great Gathering! Ekakimon of Dreams"); Transliteration: "Yūfō Kyōryū Daishūgō! Yume no Ekakimon" (Japanese: UFO・恐竜大集合！夢のエカキモン)	Unknown	Isao Murayama	January 31, 2012
73	19	("The Great Undersea Adventure! Find the Digimon Treasure of Dreams!"); Transliteration: "Kaitei Daibōken! Yume no Zaihō Dejimon o Sagase!" (Japanese: 海底大冒険！夢の財宝デジモンを探せ！)	Unknown	Shōji Yonemura	February 7, 2012
74	20	("Rare Card Vanished! The Invincible RookChessmon"); Transliteration: "Rea Kādo ga Kieta! Muteki no Rūkuchesumon" (Japanese: レアカードが消えた！無敵のルークチェスモン)	Unknown	Reiko Yoshida	February 14, 2012
75	21	("The Amusement Park of Dreams, Digimon Land!"); Transliteration: "Yume no Yūenchi, Dejimon Rando!" (Japanese: 夢の遊園地、デジモンランド！)	Unknown	Aiuchi Mio	February 21, 2012
76	22	("The Golden Insect! The Mysterious MetallifeKuwagamon"); Transliteration: "Ōgon Konchū! Metarifekuwagāmon no Nazo" (Japanese: 黄金昆虫！メタリフェクワガーモンの謎)	Unknown	Riku Sanjo	February 28, 2012
77	23	("Now Revealed! The Secret of the Digimon Hunt"); Transliteration: "Ima Akasareru! Dejimon Hanto no Himitsu" (Japanese: 今明かされる！デジモンハントの秘密)	Unknown	Riku Sanjo	March 7, 2012
78	24	("Grand Gathering of the Legendary Heroes! The Play-offs of the Digimon All Stars!!"); Transliteration: "Densetsu no Hīrō Daishūketsu! Dejimon Ōru Sutā Kessen!!" (Japanese: 伝説のヒーロー大集結！デジモンオールスター決戦!!)	Unknown	Riku Sanjo	March 14, 2012
79	25	("Now Burn Up Tagiru! The Glorious Digimon Hunt!"); Transliteration: "Moeagare Tagiru! Eikō no Dejimon Hanto!" (Japanese: 燃え上がれタギル！栄光のデジモンハント！)	Unknown	Riku Sanjo	March 21, 2012

=== Season 7: Digimon Universe: App Monsters (2016–17) ===
No.	Title	Original release date
1	"The Search Result is Haru Shinkai! Gatchmon Appears!"; Transliteration: "Kensaku Kekka wa Shinkai Haru! Gacchimon Arawaru!" (Japanese: 検索結果は新海ハル！ガッチモンあらわる！)	October 1, 2016
2	"The Mysterious Guide! I am Navimon!"; Transliteration: "Ayashiki Michisaki An'nainin! Sessha Nabimon de gozaru!" (Japanese: あやしき道先案内人！拙者ナビモンでござる！)	October 8, 2016
3	"The Role of Culture in Nature's Garb!? Roleplaymon's School Dungeon!"; Transliteration: "Sodateta Kyara ga Supponpon!? Rōpuremon no Gakkō Danjon!" (Japanese: 育てたキャラがスッポンポン！？ロープレモンの学校ダンジョン！)	October 15, 2016
4	"Take Your Dressing! Cameramon's Halloween Scandal!"; Transliteration: "Kasō no Kimi o ui tadakimasu! Kyameramon no Harowin Sukyandaru!" (Japanese: 仮装のキミをうぃただきます！キャメラモンのハロウィンスキャンダル！)	October 22, 2016
5	"An Explosive Punch to Your Heart! Eri is the Appmon Idol!"; Transliteration: "Anata no Hāto ni Dokkan Panchi! Eri wa Apumon Aidoru!" (Japanese: あなたのハートにドッカンパンチ！エリはアプモンアイドル！)	October 29, 2016
6	"The Best Gourmet Report! Gourmet Appli, Perorimon!"; Transliteration: "Saikō no Gurume Repōto! Gurume Apuri・Perorimon!" (Japanese: 最高のグルメレポート！グルメアプリ・ペロリモン！)	November 5, 2016
7	"The third Appli Drive! Torajirou is the Apptuber!"; Transliteration: "Mitsume no Apuri Doraivu! Torajirō wa Apu Chūbā!" (Japanese: 3つ目のアプリドライヴ！虎次郎はアプチューバー！)	November 12, 2016
8	"The Super Suck Big Pinch!? Astra's Great "Interesting Animation" Operation!"; Transliteration: "Dai Pinchi de Chō Norenē!? Asutora no Omoshiro Dōga Daisakusen!" (Japanese: 大ピンチで超ノレねえ！？アストラのおもしろ動画大作戦！)	November 19, 2016
9	"Aim at the Rated Number One! Appmon Championship in Cyber Arena!"; Transliteration: "Mezase Kakuzuke Nanbāwan! Apumon Senshuken In Saibā Arīna!" (Japanese: めざせ格付けナンバーワン！アプモン選手権 イン サイバーアリーナ！)	November 26, 2016
10	"The Appmon's Long-Awaited! The Legend Seven Code Meeting!"; Transliteration: "Apumon tachi no Akogare! Densetsu no Sebun Kōdo Kai!" (Japanese: アプモンたちのあこがれ！伝説のセブンコード会！)	December 3, 2016
11	"Dive into the Net Ocean! Chasing to the Super Hacker, Rei!"; Transliteration: "Netto no Umi ni Daibu seyo! Sūpā Hakkā Rei o Oe!" (Japanese: ネットの海にダイブせよ！スーパーハッカー レイを追え！)	December 10, 2016
12	"Defeating Sakusimon with Super Applink!"; Transliteration: "Sakushimon Chō Apurinku de Uchiyabure!" (Japanese: サクシモン 超アプリンクで 打ち破れ！)	December 17, 2016
13	"The Christmas Disappeared!? The Calendar Thief Calendarmon!"; Transliteration: "Kurisumasu ga Kiechatta!? Koyomi Dorobō Karendamon!" (Japanese: クリスマスが消えちゃった！？暦泥棒カレンダモン！)	December 24, 2016
14	"The City Becomes Puzzle Game!? Puzzlemon Runaway!"; Transliteration: "Machijū ga Pazuru Gēmu!? Pazurumon Dai Bōsō!" (Japanese: 街中がパズルゲーム！？パズルモン大暴走！)	January 7, 2017
15	"See Through the Future!? Mysterious Fortune Teller, Tellermon"; Transliteration: "Mirai wa Zenbu Mieteiru!? Shinpi no Uranai・Terāmon" (Japanese: 未来は全部見えている！？神秘の占い・テラーモン)	January 14, 2017
16	"The Message that Transcends Time – The Truth About the AppliDrive"; Transliteration: ""Toki" o Koeta Messēji – Apuri Doraivu no Shinjitsu" (Japanese: 『トキ』を超えたメッセージ アプリドライヴの真実)	January 21, 2017
17	"Eri is Multiplying by Copy-paste?! Reclaim, the Stage of Dreams!"; Transliteration: "Eri ga Kopipe de Daizōshoku!? Torimodose, Yume no Sutēji!" (Japanese: エリがコピペで大増殖！？とりもどせ、夢のステージ！)	January 28, 2017
18	"Haru and Yujin's Bond – Stop! Rampaging Resshamon!"; Transliteration: "Haru to Yūjin no Kizuna – Tomero! Bōsō Resshamon!" (Japanese: ハルと勇仁の絆 止めろ！暴走レッシャモン！)	February 4, 2017
19	"The Net Ocean in a Big Pinch! The Time is Here, Ultimate AppFusion!!"; Transliteration: "Netto no Umi ga Dai Pinchi! "Toki" wa Ki ta, Kiwami Apu Gattai!!" (Japanese: ネットの海が大ピンチ！『トキ』は来た、極アプ合体！！)	February 11, 2017
20	"Goodbye Astra!? Dreamon's Nightmare!"; Transliteration: "Sayonara Asutora!? Dorīmon no Akumu!" (Japanese: さよならアストラ！？ドリーモンの悪夢！)	February 18, 2017
21	"The Way to the Top Idol! Coachmon's Intensive Training!"; Transliteration: "Toppu Aidoru e no Michi! Kōchimon no Mō Tokkun!" (Japanese: トップアイドルへの道！コーチモンの猛特訓！)	February 25, 2017
22	"Lend me Your Power – Rei and Hackmon, Encounter in that Day"; Transliteration: "Omae no Chikara o Ore ni Kase – Rei to Hakkumon, Ano Hi no Deai" (Japanese: お前の力を俺に貸せ レイとハックモン、あの日の出会い)	March 4, 2017
23	"Take Back the Seven Code Appmon! Showdown Ultimate vs Ultimate!"; Transliteration: "Torimodose Sebun Kōdo Apumon! Taiketsu Kiwami tai Kiwami!" (Japanese: とりもどせセブンコードアプモン！対決 極VS極！)	March 11, 2017
24	"Super Giant Cometmon Invasion!? Open the Door, Dantemon!"; Transliteration: "Chō Kyodai Komettomon Shūrai!? Tobira o Hirake, Dantemon!" (Japanese: 超巨大コメットモン襲来！？扉をひらけ、ダンテモン！)	March 18, 2017
25	"Infiltrating to the Deep Web at last! The Mysterious Cyber Kowloon!"; Transliteration: "Tsuini Sennyū Dīpu Webu! Nazo no Saibā Kūron!" (Japanese: ついに潜入ディープウェブ！謎のサイバー九龍！)	March 25, 2017
26	"I am the Protagonist!? Encounter with Gatchmon"; Transliteration: "Boku ga Shujinkō!? Gacchimon to no Deai" (Japanese: ボクが主人公！？ガッチモンとの出会い)	April 1, 2017
27	"The Fifth AppliDriver!"; Transliteration: "Goninme no Apuri Doraivā!" (Japanese: 五人目のアプリドライヴァー！)	April 8, 2017
28	"The AppliDrive DUO! Offmon Appears"; Transliteration: "Apuri Doraivu Dyuo! Ofumon Arawaru" (Japanese: アプリドライヴDUO！オフモンあらわる)	April 15, 2017
29	"Buddies no More!? Gatchmon's Run away from home" Transliteration: "Badi Kaishō!? Gacchimon no Iede" (Japanese: バディ解消！？ガッチモンの家出)	April 22, 2017
30	"Dokamon's Love!? Gourmet Appli, Marypero Invasion!"; Transliteration: "Dokamon no Koi!? Gurume Apuri・Maripero Shūrai!" (Japanese: ドカモンの恋！？グルメアプリ・マリペロ襲来！)	April 29, 2017
31	"The Traveling Companion!? Tripmon's Terrible Trip"; Transliteration: "Tabi wa Michizure!? Torippumon no Kyōfu Torippu" (Japanese: 旅は道連れ！？トリップモンの恐怖トリップ)	May 6, 2017
32	"Everyone to Take you Out! The Self-Withdrawal Offmon!"; Transliteration: "Minna de Tsuredase! Hikikomori no Ofumon!" (Japanese: みんなで連れ出せ！引きこもりのオフモン！)	May 13, 2017
33	"The Senior High School Student CEO! Knight Unryūji Appears!"; Transliteration: "Kōkōsei CEO! Unryūji Naito Arawaru!" (Japanese: 高校生CEO！雲龍寺ナイトあらわる！)	May 20, 2017
34	"Thank you Future! Welcome to the City of Artificial Intelligence!"; Transliteration: "Sankyū Mirai! Jinkōchinō no Machi e Yōkoso!" (Japanese: サンキュー未来！人工知能の街へようこそ！)	May 27, 2017
35	"Aim to be the God 9! The General Election of AppliYama 470!"; Transliteration: "Mezase Kyūnin Goddo! Apuri Yama 470 Sōsenkyo!" (Japanese: めざせ9人ゴッド！アプリ山470総選挙！)	June 3, 2017
36	"The Conclusion of General Election! The Hand of Devil Approaching to Eri!"; Transliteration: "Sōsenkyo Kecchaku! Eri ni Semaru Manote!" (Japanese: 総選挙決着！エリに迫る魔の手！)	June 10, 2017
37	"Invasion! The Ultimate Appmons, Ultimate 4!"; Transliteration: "Shūrai! Kiwami Apumon・Arutimetto 4!" (Japanese: 襲来！極アプモン・アルティメット4！)	June 17, 2017
38	"Take Back the Gatchmon! Grandpa Den'emon's Trial!"; Transliteration: "Gacchimon o Torimodose! Den'emon Jīchan no Shiren!" (Japanese: ガッチモンを取り戻せ！電衛門じいちゃんの試練！)	June 24, 2017
39	"The New Power! The AppliDrive DUO!"; Transliteration: "Aratana Chikara! Apuri Doraivu Dyuo!" (Japanese: 新たな力！アプリドライヴDUO！)	July 1, 2017
40	"Ultimate 4 Returns! Cloud's Challenge Letter!"; Transliteration: "Arutimetto 4 Futatabi! Kuraudo no Chōsenjō!" (Japanese: アルティメット4再び！クラウドの挑戦状！)	July 8, 2017
41	"The Ultimate Fierce Fighting! Globemon vs Charismon!"; Transliteration: "Kyokugen no Gekitō! Gurōbumon tai Karisumon!" (Japanese: 極限の激闘！グローブモンVSカリスモン！)	July 15, 2017
42	"Rei's Determination! The Great "Search for Hajime" Operation!"; Transliteration: "Rei no Ketsui! Hajime Sōsaku Daisakusen!" (Japanese: レイの決意！はじめ捜索大作戦！)	July 22, 2017
43	"Wake Up, Sleepmon! The Appmon Championship Reopening!!"; Transliteration: "Mezamero, Surīpumon! Apumon Senshuken Futatabi!!" (Japanese: 目覚めろ、スリープモン！アプモン選手権再び！！)	July 29, 2017
44	"Chasing to the Fugitive, Bootmon!"; Transliteration: "Tōbōsha・Būtomon o Oe!" (Japanese: 逃亡者・ブートモンを追え！)	August 5, 2017
45	"The Big Crash!? Gatchmon vs Agumon!"; Transliteration: "Dai Gekitotsu!? Gacchimon tai Agumon!" (Japanese: 大激突！？ガッチモンVSアグモン！)	August 12, 2017
46	"The Oath Beneath the Starry Sky! The Great "Rescue for Astra" Operation!"; Transliteration: "Hoshizora no Chikai! Asutora Kyūshutsu Daisakusen!" (Japanese: 星空の誓い！アストラ救出大作戦！)	August 19, 2017
47	"The Truth about Yujin"; Transliteration: "Yūjin no Shinjitsu" (Japanese: 勇仁の真実)	August 26, 2017
48	"Starting! The Design of Humanity Application!"; Transliteration: "Kidō! Jinrui Apurika Keikaku!" (Japanese: 起動！人類アプリ化計画！)	September 2, 2017
49	"The Miraculous Final Evolution! The God Appmon Advent!"; Transliteration: "Kiseki no Saishū Shinka! Kami Apumon Kōrin!" (Japanese: 奇跡の最終進化！神アプモン降臨！)	September 9, 2017
50	"The Bond of Hope! Haru and Gaiamon!!"; Transliteration: "Kibō no Kizuna! Haru to Gaiamon!!" (Japanese: 希望の絆！ハルとガイアモン！！)	September 16, 2017
51	"The Dream of Artificial Intelligence"; Transliteration: "Jinkōchinō no Miru Yume" (Japanese: 人工知能の見る夢)	September 23, 2017
52	"Our Singularity"; Transliteration: "Bokutachi no Shingyuraritī" (Japanese: ボクたちのシンギュラリティー)	September 30, 2017

=== Season 8: Digimon Adventure: (2020–21) ===
No.	English version titles (in brackets, of the subtitled version (Note: All English episode titles taken from Crunchyroll.))	Directed by	Written by	Original release date	English air date
1	"Tokyo Digital Crisis" (Tokyo Digital Crisis); Transliteration: "Tōkyō Dejitaru Kuraishisu" (Japanese: 東京デジタルクライシス)	Masato Mitsuka	Atsuhiro Tomioka	April 5, 2020	November 19, 2022 (preview); April 13, 2023
2	"War Game" (War Game); Transliteration: "Wō Gēmu" (Japanese: ウォー・ゲーム)	Nozomu Shishido	Atsuhiro Tomioka	April 12, 2020	November 19, 2022 (preview); April 13, 2023
3	"And to the Digital World" (And to the Digital World); Transliteration: "Soshite Dejitaru Wārudo e" (Japanese: そしてデジタルワールドへ)	Hideki Hiroshima	Atsuhiro Tomioka	April 19, 2020	April 13, 2023
4	"Birdramon Soars" (Birdramon Soars); Transliteration: "Bādoramon Hishō" (Japanese: バードラモン飛翔)	Noriyo Sasaki	Ken'ichi Yamashita	June 28, 2020	April 13, 2023
5	"The Celestial Digimon" (The Holy Digimon); Transliteration: "Seinaru Dejimon" (Japanese: 聖なるデジモン)	Kimiharu Mutō	Atsuhiro Tomioka	July 5, 2020	April 13, 2023
6	"The Targeted Kingdom" (The Targeted Kingdom); Transliteration: "Nerawareta Ōkoku" (Japanese: 狙われた王国)	Yō★Nakano	Hiroshi Yamaguchi	July 12, 2020	April 13, 2023
7	"That Boy is Joe Kido" (That Boy is Joe Kido); Transliteration: "Sono Otoko, Kido Jō" (Japanese: その男、城戸丈)	Matsuda Tetsuaki	Kenji Konuta	July 19, 2020	April 13, 2023
8	"The Children's Attack on the Fortress" (The Children's Attack on the Fortress); Transliteration: "Kodomotachi no Kōjōsen" (Japanese: 子供たちの攻城戦)	Yōko Furuya; Yūichi Tsuzuki	Toshiaki Satō	July 26, 2020	April 13, 2023
9	"The Ultimate Digimon Attacks" (The Ultimate Digimon Attacks); Transliteration: "Kanzen-tai Shūrai" (Japanese: 完全体・襲来)	Kenji Setō	Masashi Sogo	August 2, 2020	April 13, 2023
10	"The Steel-Solid Super Digivolution (Note: As announced vocally in the teaser at the end of episode 9.)" (The Steel-Solid Super Evolution); Transliteration: "Kōtetsu no Chōshinka" (Japanese: 鋼鉄の超進化)	Hideki Hiroshima	Atsuhiro Tomioka	August 9, 2020	April 13, 2023
11	"The Wolf Standing Atop the Desert" (The Wolf Standing Atop the Desert); Transliteration: "Sabaku ni Tatsu Ōkami" (Japanese: 砂漠に立つ狼)	Kimiharu Mutō	Atsuhiro Tomioka	August 16, 2020	April 13, 2023
12	"Lillymon Blooms" (Lilimon Blooms); Transliteration: "Ririmon Kaika" (Japanese: リリモン開花)	Nozomu Shishido	Hiroshi Yamaguchi	August 23, 2020	April 13, 2023
13	"Garudamon of the Crimson Wings" (Garudamon of the Crimson Wings); Transliteration: "Guren no Tsubasa Garudamon" (Japanese: 紅蓮の翼ガルダモン)	Matsuda Tetsuaki	Ken'ichi Yamashita	August 30, 2020	April 13, 2023
14	"The Kings of the Insects Clash" (The Kings of the Insects Clash); Transliteration: "Gekitotsu Konchū no Ōja" (Japanese: 激突 昆虫の王者)	Ryūta Yamamoto	Masashi Sogo	September 6, 2020	April 13, 2023
15	"Zudomon's Iron Hammer of Lightning" (Zudomon's Iron Hammer of Lightning); Transliteration: "Zudomon Inazuma no Tettsui" (Japanese: ズドモン 稲妻の鉄槌)	Kenji Setō	Toshiaki Satō	September 13, 2020	April 13, 2023
16	"The Jet-Black Shadow Invades Tokyo" (The Jet-Black Shadow Invades Tokyo); Transliteration: "Tōkyō Shinshoku Shikkoku no Kage" (Japanese: 東京侵食 漆黒の影)	Hideki Hiroshima	Kenji Konuta	September 20, 2020	April 13, 2023
17	"The Battle in Tokyo Against Orochimon" (The Battle in Tokyo Against Orochimon); Transliteration: "Tōkyō Kessen Orochimon" (Japanese: 東京決戦 オロチモン)	Kimiharu Mutō	Hiroshi Yamaguchi	September 27, 2020	April 13, 2023
18	"Countdown to Tokyo's Annihilation" (Countdown to Tokyo's Annihilation); Transliteration: "Tōkyō Shōmetsu Kauntodaun" (Japanese: 東京消滅 カウントダウン)	Yukio Kaizawa	Atsuhiro Tomioka	October 4, 2020	April 13, 2023
19	"Fist of the Beast King" (Howl, Jyuoken); Transliteration: "Hoe yo Jūōken" (Japanese: 吠えよ獣王拳)	Michihiro Satō	Masashi Sogo	October 11, 2020	April 13, 2023
20	"The Seventh One Awakens" (The Seventh One Awakens); Transliteration: "Shichininme no Kakusei" (Japanese: 七人目の覚醒)	Ryō Nanba	Ken'ichi Yamashita; Atsuhiro Tomioka	October 18, 2020	April 13, 2023
21	"The Tide-Turning Update" (The Tide-Turning Update); Transliteration: "Gyakuten no Appudēto" (Japanese: 逆転の武装鋼化)	Kenji Setō	Toshiaki Satō	October 25, 2020	April 13, 2023
22	"The Unbeatable Blue Sagittarius" (The Unbeatable Blue Sagittarius); Transliteration: "Fukutsu no Aoki Sajitariusu" (Japanese: 不屈の蒼き機翼)	Hideki Hiroshima	Kenji Konuta	November 1, 2020	April 13, 2023
23	"The Messenger of Darkness, Devimon" (The Messenger of Darkness, Devimon); Transliteration: "Yami no Shisha Debimon" (Japanese: 闇の使者デビモン)	Kimiharu Mutō	Hiroshi Yamaguchi	November 8, 2020	April 13, 2023
24	"The Final Stage, Dandevimon" (The Final Stage, DoneDevimon); Transliteration: "Shūkyoku DanDebimon" (Japanese: 終極 ダンデビモン)	Nozomu Shishido	Masashi Sogo	November 15, 2020	April 13, 2023
25	"Dive to the Next Ocean" (Dive to the Next Ocean); Transliteration: "Daibu Tsuginaru Umi e" (Japanese: ダイブ 次なる海へ)	Michihiro Satō	Masashi Sogo	November 22, 2020	April 13, 2023
26	"Break Through the Sea Monster Barricade" (Break Through the Sea Monster Barricade); Transliteration: "Toppa Kaijū Hōimō" (Japanese: 突破 海獣包囲網)	Mana Uchiyama	Toshiaki Satō	November 29, 2020	April 13, 2023
27	"To the New Continent" (To the New Continent); Transliteration: "Shintairiku e" (Japanese: 新大陸へ)	Kenji Setō	Atsuhiro Tomioka	December 6, 2020	April 13, 2023
28	"The Children's Fight for Survival" (The Children's Fight for Survival); Transliteration: "Kodomotachi no Sabaibaru" (Japanese: 子供たちのサバイバル)	Noriyo Sasaki	Atsuhiro Tomioka	December 13, 2020	April 13, 2023
29	"Escape the Burning Jungle" (Escape the Burning Jungle); Transliteration: "Dasshutsu Moeru Mitsurin" (Japanese: 脱出 燃える密林)	Kimiharu Mutō	Kenji Konuta	December 20, 2020	April 13, 2023
30	"The Mega Digimon, WarGreymon" (The Mega Digimon, WarGreymon); Transliteration: "Kyūkyoku-tai WōGureimon" (Japanese: 究極体ウォーグレイモン)	Hideki Hiroshima	Hiroshi Yamaguchi	December 27, 2020	April 13, 2023
31	"A New Darkness, Millenniummon" (A New Darkness, Millenniumon); Transliteration: "Arata na Yami Mireniamon" (Japanese: 新たな闇ミレニアモン)	Michihiro Satō	Atsuhiro Tomioka	January 10, 2021	April 13, 2023
32	"Soaring Hope" (Soaring Hope); Transliteration: "Ama Kakeru Kibō" (Japanese: 天駆ける希望)	Ryō Nanba	Masashi Sogo	January 17, 2021	April 13, 2023
33	"The Kari of Dawn" (The Hikari of Dawn); Transliteration: "Yoake no Hikari" (Japanese: 夜明けのヒカリ)	Kenji Setō	Atsuhiro Tomioka	January 24, 2021	April 13, 2023
34	"Kari and Gatomon" (Hikari and Tailmon); Transliteration: "Hikari to Teirumon" (Japanese: ヒカリとテイルモン)	Ryūta Yamamoto	Atsuhiro Tomioka	January 31, 2021	April 13, 2023
35	"The Glowing Angewomon" (The Glowing Angewomon); Transliteration: "Kirameku Enjeūmon" (Japanese: 煌くエンジェウーモン)	Kimiharu Mutō	Kenji Konuta	February 7, 2021	April 13, 2023
36	"Operation Satellite Sniper" (Operation Satellite Sniper); Transliteration: "Eisei Sogeki Sakusen" (Japanese: 衛星狙撃作戦)	Mana Uchiyama	Masashi Sogo	February 14, 2021	April 13, 2023
37	"Mimi Wars" (Mimi-chan Wars); Transliteration: "Mimi-chan Wōzu" (Japanese: ミミちゃんウォーズ)	Michihiro Satō	Hiroshi Yamaguchi	February 21, 2021	April 13, 2023
38	"The Blazing Blue Friendship" (The Blazing Blue Friendship); Transliteration: "Moeru Aoki Yūjō" (Japanese: 燃える 蒼き友情)	Hideki Hiroshima	Toshiaki Satō	February 28, 2021	April 13, 2023
39	"Jagamon, Potato Trouble" (Jyagamon, Potato Hell); Transliteration: "Jagamon Poteto Jigoku" (Japanese: ジャガモン ポテト地獄)	Kenji Setō	Atsuhiro Tomioka	March 7, 2021	April 13, 2023
40	"Strike! The Killer Shot" (Strike! The Killer Shot); Transliteration: "Kimero! Hissatsu Shūto" (Japanese: 決めろ！必殺シュート)	Noriyo Sasaki	Masashi Sogo	March 21, 2021	April 13, 2023
41	"Mon-Mon Park in the Fog" (Mon-Mon Park in the Fog); Transliteration: "Kiri no Monmon Pāku" (Japanese: 霧のもんモンパーク)	Kimiharu Mutō	Hiroshi Yamaguchi	March 28, 2021	April 13, 2023
42	"King of Inventors, Garbagemon" (King of Inventors, Gerbemon); Transliteration: "Hatsumei Ō Gābemon" (Japanese: 発明王ガーベモン)	Ryūta Yamamoto	Masashi Sogo	April 4, 2021	April 13, 2023
43	"Clash, the King of Digimon" (Clash, the King of Digimon); Transliteration: "Gekitotsu Kingu obu Dejimon" (Japanese: 激突 キング・オブ・デジモン)	Ryō Nanba	Kenji Konuta	April 11, 2021	April 13, 2023
44	"Kari and the Moving Forest" (Hikari and the Moving Forest); Transliteration: "Hikari to Ugoku Mori" (Japanese: ヒカリと動く森)	Yūichi Tsuzuki	Natsumi Moriuchi	April 18, 2021	April 13, 2023
45	"Activate, MetalGarurumon" (Activate, MetalGarurumon); Transliteration: "Kidō MetaruGarurumon" (Japanese: 起動 メタルガルルモン)	Kenji Setō	Masashi Sogo	April 25, 2021	April 13, 2023
46	"The Sword of Hope" (The Sword of Hope); Transliteration: "Kibō no Tsurugi" (Japanese: 希望の聖剣)	Kenta Nishi	Hiroshi Yamaguchi	May 2, 2021	April 13, 2023
47	"The Villains of the Wastelands" (The Villains of the Wastelands); Transliteration: "Kōya no Akutōtachi" (Japanese: 荒野の悪党たち)	Mana Uchiyama	Toshiaki Satō	May 9, 2021	April 13, 2023
48	"The Attack of Machinedramon" (The Attack of Mugendramon); Transliteration: "Mugendoramon no Shūgeki" (Japanese: ムゲンドラモンの襲撃)	Hideki Hiroshima	Masashi Sogo	May 16, 2021	April 13, 2023
49	"The God of Evil Descends, Millenniummon" (The God of Evil Descends, Millenniumon); Transliteration: "Jashin Kōrin Mireniamon" (Japanese: 邪神降臨ミレニアモン)	Kimiharu Mutō	Masashi Sogo	May 23, 2021	April 13, 2023
50	"The End, the Ultimate Celestial Battle" (The End, the Ultimate Holy Battle); Transliteration: "Shūketsu Kyūkyoku no Seisen" (Japanese: 終結 究極の聖戦)	Takashi Ōtsuka	Kenji Konuta	May 30, 2021	April 13, 2023
51	"The Mystery Hidden Within the Crests" (The Mystery Hidden Within the Crests); Transliteration: "Monshō ni Kakusareta Nazo" (Japanese: 紋章に隠された謎)	Ryūta Yamamoto	Atsuhiro Tomioka	June 6, 2021	April 13, 2023
52	"Dance of the Heavens, Phoenixmon" (Dance of the Heavens, Hououmon); Transliteration: "Tenbu Hououmon" (Japanese: 天舞 ホウオウモン)	Noriyo Sasaki	Natsumi Moriuchi	June 13, 2021	April 13, 2023
53	"The Geko Hot Springs' Revolt" (The Geko Hot Springs' Revolt); Transliteration: "Geko Onsen no Ran" (Japanese: ゲコ温泉の乱)	Kenji Setō; Michihiro Satō	Toshiaki Satō	June 20, 2021	April 13, 2023
54	"The Vagrant War Demon, Rebellimon" (The Vagrant War Demon, Rebellimon); Transliteration: "Sasurai no Senki Riberimon" (Japanese: さすらいの戦鬼リベリモン)	Nozomu Shishido	Masashi Sogo	June 27, 2021	April 13, 2023
55	"The Digimon School Under Attack" (The Digimon School Under Attack); Transliteration: "Nerawareta Dejimon Gakkō" (Japanese: 狙われたデジモン学校)	Kenta Nishi	Hiroshi Yamaguchi	July 4, 2021	April 13, 2023
56	"The Gold Wolf of the Crescent Moon" (The Gold Wolf of the Crescent Moon); Transliteration: "Mikazuki no Kinrō" (Japanese: 三日月の金狼)	Mana Uchiyama	Kenji Konuta	July 11, 2021	April 13, 2023
57	"Contact from the Catastrophe" (Contact from the Catastrophe); Transliteration: "Hametsu Kara no Kontakuto" (Japanese: 破滅からの接触)	Kimiharu Mutō	Atsuhiro Tomioka	July 18, 2021	April 13, 2023
58	"Kari, New Life" (Hikari, New Life); Transliteration: "Hikari Arata na Inochi" (Japanese: ヒカリ 新たな命)	Hideki Hiroshima	Masashi Sogo	July 25, 2021	April 13, 2023
59	"Bolt, HerculesKabuterimon" (Bolt, HerakleKabuterimon); Transliteration: "Denkō HerakuruKabuterimon" (Japanese: 電光ヘラクルカブテリモン)	Ryūta Yamamoto	Natsumi Moriuchi	August 1, 2021	April 13, 2023
60	"Vikemon Ventures the Glaciers" (Vikemon Ventures the Glaciers); Transliteration: "Hyōga o Yuku Vaikumon" (Japanese: 氷河を征くヴァイクモン)	Yūichi Tsuzuki	Hiroshi Yamaguchi	August 8, 2021	April 13, 2023
61	"A Place to Return To" (A Place to Return To); Transliteration: "Kaeritai Basho e" (Japanese: 帰りたい場所へ)	Kenji Setō	Toshiaki Satō	August 15, 2021	April 13, 2023
62	"The Tears of Shakkoumon" (The Tears of Shakkoumon); Transliteration: "Shakkoumon no Namida" (Japanese: シャッコウモンの涙)	Noriyo Sasaki	Masashi Sogo	August 22, 2021	April 13, 2023
63	"The Crest of Courage" (The Crest of Courage); Transliteration: "Yūki no Monshō" (Japanese: 勇気の紋章)	Masahiko Suzuki	Atsuhiro Tomioka	August 29, 2021	April 13, 2023
64	"The Angels' Determination" (The Angels' Determination); Transliteration: "Tenshi-tachi no Ketsui" (Japanese: 天使たちの決意)	Hideki Hiroshima	Masashi Sogo	September 5, 2021	April 13, 2023
65	"The Great Catastrophe, Negamon" (The Great Catastrophe, Negamon); Transliteration: "Kyodai na Hametsu Negāmon" (Japanese: 巨大な破滅ネガーモン)	Mana Uchiyama	Masashi Sogo	September 12, 2021	April 13, 2023
66	"The Last Miracle, The Last Power" (The Last Miracle, The Last Power); Transliteration: "Saigo no Kiseki Saigo no Chikara" (Japanese: 最後の奇跡 最後の力)	Yūichi Tsuzuki	Hiroshi Yamaguchi	September 19, 2021	April 13, 2023
67	"The End of the Adventure" (The End of the Adventure); Transliteration: "Bōken no Hate" (Japanese: 冒険の果て)	Nozomu Shishido	Atsuhiro Tomioka	September 26, 2021	April 13, 2023

=== Season 9: Digimon Ghost Game (2021–23) ===
No.	English version titles (Note: All English episode titles taken from Crunchyroll and BBC.)	Directed and storyboarded by (Note: Information is taken from the ending credits of each episode.)	Written by	Original release date	English release date
1	The Sewn-lip Man; Transliteration: "Kuchi Nui Otoko" (Japanese: 口縫男)	Directed by : Ayaka Noro; Storyboarded by : Masatoshi Chioka, Ayaka Noro & Naotoshi Shida	Atsuhiro Tomioka & Masashi Sogo	October 3, 2021	December 1, 2025
2	The Mystery of the Museum; Transliteration: "Hakubutsukan no Kai" (Japanese: 博物館ノ怪)	Directed by : Ryōta Nakamura; Storyboarded by : Ryōta Nakamura & Masato Mitsuka	Masashi Sogo	October 10, 2021	December 1, 2025
3	Scribbles; Transliteration: "Rakugaki" (Japanese: ラクガキ)	Yōko Ikeda	Masashi Sogo	October 24, 2021	December 1, 2025
4	The Doll's Manor; Transliteration: "Ningyō no Yakata" (Japanese: 人形ノ館)	Akihiro Nakamura	Tomohiro Nakayama	October 31, 2021	December 1, 2025
5	Divine Anger; Transliteration: "Kami no Ikari" (Japanese: 神ノ怒リ)	Yū Kamatani	Masashi Sogo	November 7, 2021	December 1, 2025
6	The Cursed Song; Transliteration: "Norowareta Uta" (Japanese: 呪ワレタ歌)	Directed by : Ippo Takatoya, Ryōta Nakamura & Nozomu Shishido; Storyboarded by : Naotoshi Shida	Masashi Sogo	November 14, 2021	December 1, 2025
7	Birds; Transliteration: "Tori" (Japanese: 鳥)	Hiroyuki Kakudō	Natsumi Moriuchi	November 21, 2021	December 1, 2025
8	Nightly Procession of Monsters; Transliteration: "Hyakki Yakō" (Japanese: 百鬼夜行)	Directed by : Ayaka Noro; Storyboarded by : Masao Suzuki	Hiroshi Yamaguchi	November 28, 2021	December 1, 2025
9	Warped Time; Transliteration: "Nejireta Toki" (Japanese: 捻レタ時)	Directed by : Ippo Takatoya; Storyboarded by : Ippo Takatoya & Naotoshi Shida	Masashi Sogo	December 5, 2021	December 1, 2025
10	Game of Death; Transliteration: "Shi no Yūgi" (Japanese: 死ノ遊戯)	Directed by : Tsutomu Murakami; Storyboarded by : Naotoshi Shida	Toshiaki Satō	December 12, 2021	December 1, 2025
11	Kamaitachi; Transliteration: "Kamaitachi" (Japanese: カマイタチ)	Directed by : Yōko Ikeda; Storyboarded by : Hiroyuki Kakudō	Natsumi Moriuchi	December 19, 2021	December 1, 2025
12	Chain Letter; Transliteration: "Fukō no Tegami" (Japanese: 不幸ノ手紙)	Directed by : Kimiharu Mutō & Michihiro Satō; Storyboarded by : Masao Suzuki	Tomohiro Nakayama	December 26, 2021	December 1, 2025
13	Executioner; Transliteration: "Shokeinin" (Japanese: 処刑人)	Directed by : Akihiro Nakamura; Storyboarded by : Yoshitaka Yashima	Masashi Sogo	January 9, 2022	December 1, 2025
14	Zashiki-warashi; Transliteration: "Zashiki Warashi" (Japanese: 座敷童)	Hiroyuki Kakudō	Natsumi Moriuchi	January 16, 2022	December 1, 2025
15	The Fortuneteller's Manor; Transliteration: "Uranai no Yakata" (Japanese: 占イノ館)	Directed by : Ayaka Noro; Storyboarded by : Tetsuya Endō	Hiroshi Yamaguchi	January 23, 2022	December 1, 2025
16	The Maneater's Forest; Transliteration: "Hitokui no Mori" (Japanese: 人喰ノ森)	Directed by : Norio Kajima; Storyboarded by : Akira Nishimori	Toshiaki Satō	January 30, 2022	December 1, 2025
17	Icy Hell; Transliteration: "Gokkan Jigoku" (Japanese: 極寒地獄)	Directed by : Ippo Takatoya; Storyboarded by : Hiroyuki Kakudō & Ippo Takatoya	Masashi Sogo	February 6, 2022	December 1, 2025
18	The Land of Children; Transliteration: "Kodomo no Kuni" (Japanese: 子供ノ国)	Directed by : Noriyo Sasaki; Storyboarded by : Tetsuji Nakamura	Tomohiro Nakayama	February 13, 2022	December 1, 2025
19	The Witching Hour; Transliteration: "Ōmagatoki" (Japanese: 逢魔ガ時)	Hiroyuki Kakudō	Natsumi Moriuchi	February 20, 2022	December 1, 2025
20	Prison of Fire; Transliteration: "Honō no Kangoku" (Japanese: 炎ノ監獄)	Yūta Tanaka	Toshiaki Satō	February 27, 2022	December 1, 2025
21	The Spider's Lure; Transliteration: "Kumo no Yūwaku" (Japanese: 蜘蛛ノ誘惑)	Directed by : Ayaka Noro; Storyboarded by : Kōnosuke Uda	Hiroshi Yamaguchi	March 6, 2022	December 1, 2025
22	Nightmare; Transliteration: "Akumu" (Japanese: 悪夢)	Directed by : Kyōsuke Yamazaki; Storyboarded by : Yōko Ikeda	Ryō Yamazaki	April 17, 2022 (Note: Episode 22 was originally scheduled to air on March 20, 2022, but the series' entire schedule was subsequently delayed until further notice shortly after Toei Animation revealed their internal servers had been hacked by an unauthorized third party.)	December 1, 2025
23	Moaning Bug; Transliteration: "Umeku Mushi" (Japanese: ウメク蟲)	Nozomu Shishido	Natsumi Moriuchi	April 24, 2022	December 1, 2025
24	Twisted Love; Transliteration: "Yuganda Ai" (Japanese: 歪ンダ愛)	Directed by : Michihiro Satō; Storyboarded by : Masao Suzuki	Tomohiro Nakayama	May 1, 2022	December 1, 2025
Special	A Strange World As Told By Naoto Takenaka; Transliteration: "Takenaka Naoto ga Kataru Kaiki no Sekai" (Japanese: 竹中直人が語る怪奇の世界)	Unknown	Unknown	May 8, 2022	N/A
25	The Crimson Banquet; Transliteration: "Kurenai no Kyōen" (Japanese: 紅ノ饗宴)	Directed by : Akihiro Nakamura; Storyboarded by : Akira Nishimori	Masashi Sogo	May 15, 2022	December 1, 2025
26	Cannibal Mansion; Transliteration: "Kiga Yashiki" (Japanese: 飢餓屋敷)	Hiroyuki Kakudō	Hiroshi Yamaguchi	May 22, 2022	December 1, 2025
27	Monster's Beauty Serum; Transliteration: "Biyōeki" (Japanese: 美妖液)	Directed by : Noriyo Sasaki; Storyboarded by : Azuma Tani	Toshiaki Satō	May 29, 2022	December 1, 2025
28	Face Taker; Transliteration: "Kao Tori" (Japanese: 顔取リ)	Directed by : Tomohiro Matsukawa; Storyboarded by : Masao Suzuki	Ryō Yamazaki	June 5, 2022	December 1, 2025
29	Monster Pollen; Transliteration: "Yō Kafun" (Japanese: 妖花粉)	Directed by : Kohei Hatano; Storyboarded by : Azuma Tani	Natsumi Moriuchi	June 12, 2022	December 1, 2025
30	Bad Friend; Transliteration: "Akuyū" (Japanese: 悪友)	Directed by : Kyōsuke Yamazaki; Storyboarded by : Morio Hatano	Tomohiro Nakayama	June 19, 2022	December 1, 2025
31	Killer Blade; Transliteration: "Tsujigiri" (Japanese: 辻斬リ)	Hiroyuki Kakudō	Hiroshi Yamaguchi	June 26, 2022	December 1, 2025
32	Who Are You? Transliteration: "Omae wa Dareda" (Japanese: オマエハ誰ダ)	Directed by : Ayaka Noro; Storyboarded by : Hiroyuki Kakudō & Ayaka Noro	Shinzō Fujita	July 3, 2022	December 1, 2025
33	Whispers of the Dead; Transliteration: "Shiryō no Sasayaki" (Japanese: 死霊ノ囁キ)	Ippo Takatoya	Toshiaki Satō	July 10, 2022	December 1, 2025
34	Wall Crawlers; Transliteration: "Kabe Hau Mono" (Japanese: 壁這ウ者)	Directed by : Akihiro Nakamura; Storyboarded by : Azuma Tani	Hiroshi Yamaguchi	July 17, 2022	December 1, 2025
35	Werewolf; Transliteration: "Hito Ōkami" (Japanese: 人狼)	Yōko Ikeda	Natsumi Moriuchi	July 24, 2022	December 1, 2025
36	Labyrinth of Grief; Transliteration: "Nageki no Meikyū" (Japanese: 嘆キノ迷宮)	Directed by : Ryō Nanba; Storyboarded by : Masao Suzuki	Tomohiro Nakayama	July 31, 2022	December 1, 2025
37	Horde of the Dead; Transliteration: "Shiryō no Mure" (Japanese: 死霊ノ群レ)	Hiroyuki Kakudō	Shinzō Fujita	August 7, 2022	December 1, 2025
38	The Diviner; Transliteration: "Onmyōji" (Japanese: 陰陽師)	Directed by : Kenta Nishi; Storyboarded by : Azuma Tani	Masashi Sogo	August 14, 2022	December 1, 2025
39	Contagion Island; Transliteration: "Kansen Kotō" (Japanese: 感染孤島)	Directed by : Kohei Hatano; Storyboarded by : Hiroyuki Kakudō	Natsumi Moriuchi	August 21, 2022	December 1, 2025
40	Spiral Beach; Transliteration: "Rasen Kaigan" (Japanese: 螺旋海岸)	Ayako Hiraike	Hiroshi Yamaguchi	August 28, 2022	December 1, 2025
41	Clown; Transliteration: "Dōkeshi" (Japanese: 道化師)	Directed by : Kyōsuke Yamazaki; Storyboarded by : Morio Hatano	Toshiaki Satō	September 4, 2022	December 1, 2025
42	Human Hunter; Transliteration: "Hito Gari" (Japanese: 人狩リ)	Hiroki Fukuoka	Shinzō Fujita	September 11, 2022	December 1, 2025
43	Red Eye; Transliteration: "Akame" (Japanese: 赤目)	Directed by : Ayaka Noro; Storyboarded by : Hiroyuki Kakudō & Ayaka Noro	Ryō Yamazaki	September 18, 2022	December 1, 2025
44	Rust; Transliteration: "Akasabi" (Japanese: 赤錆)	Ippo Takatoya	Tomohiro Nakayama	September 25, 2022	December 1, 2025
45	Ghost Newspaper; Transliteration: "Yūrei Shinbun" (Japanese: 幽霊新聞)	Directed by : Satoshi Takafuji; Storyboarded by : Masao Suzuki	Natsumi Moriuchi	October 2, 2022	December 1, 2025
46	The Queen's Banquet; Transliteration: "Joō no Bansan" (Japanese: 女王ノ晩餐)	Akihiro Nakamura	Hiroshi Yamaguchi	October 9, 2022	December 1, 2025
47	Eternal Memories; Transliteration: "Eien no Kioku" (Japanese: 永遠ノ記憶)	Hiroyuki Kakudō	Toshiaki Satō	October 16, 2022	December 1, 2025
48	The White Bride; Transliteration: "Shiroi Hanayome" (Japanese: 白イ花嫁)	Directed by : Kohei Hatano; Storyboarded by : Masao Suzuki	Shinzō Fujita	October 23, 2022	December 1, 2025
49	The Crimson Harvest Festival; Transliteration: "Shinku no Shūkakusai" (Japanese: 真紅ノ収穫祭)	Directed by : Ryō Nanba; Storyboarded by : Hiroyuki Kakudō	Tomohiro Nakayama	October 30, 2022	December 1, 2025
50	Payback; Transliteration: "Okaeshi" (Japanese: オカエシ)	Yoshihiro Ueda	Natsumi Moriuchi	November 6, 2022	December 1, 2025
51	Headless; Transliteration: "Kubi Nashi" (Japanese: 首ナシ)	Yōko Ikeda	Hiroshi Yamaguchi	November 13, 2022	December 1, 2025
52	Mysterious Lake; Transliteration: "Ayakashi no Mizuumi" (Japanese: 妖ノ湖)	Directed by : Kenta Nishi; Storyboarded by : Hiroki Fukuoka	Masashi Sogo	November 20, 2022	December 1, 2025
53	King of Knowledge; Transliteration: "Chishiki Ō" (Japanese: 知識王)	Directed by : Ayaka Noro; Storyboarded by : Hiroyuki Kakudō & Ayaka Noro	Toshiaki Satō	November 27, 2022	December 1, 2025
54	Second Sight; Transliteration: "Senrigan" (Japanese: 千里眼)	Directed by : Kohei Hatano; Storyboarded by : Morio Hatano	Shinzō Fujita	December 4, 2022	December 1, 2025
55	Bakeneko; Transliteration: "Bakeneko" (Japanese: 化ケ猫)	Ippo Takatoya	Tomohiro Nakayama	December 11, 2022	December 1, 2025
56	Impurity; Transliteration: "Kegare" (Japanese: 穢レ)	Nozomu Shishido	Hiroshi Yamaguchi	December 18, 2022	December 1, 2025
57	Ghost Taxi; Transliteration: "Yūrei Takushī" (Japanese: 幽霊タクシー)	Directed by : Ryō Nanba; Storyboarded by : Yōko Furuya	Natsumi Moriuchi	December 25, 2022	December 1, 2025
58	Pyramid; Transliteration: "Kinjitō" (Japanese: 金字塔)	Hiroyuki Kakudō	Toshiaki Satō	January 8, 2023	December 1, 2025
59	Jiraiya; Transliteration: "Jiraiya" (Japanese: 児雷也)	Directed by : Takao Kiriyama; Storyboarded by : Hiroki Fukuoka	Tomohiro Nakayama	January 15, 2023	December 1, 2025
60	Water Ghost; Transliteration: "Mizu no Yūrei" (Japanese: 水ノ幽霊)	Akihiro Nakamura	Shinzō Fujita	January 22, 2023	December 1, 2025
61	Resurrection; Transliteration: "Yomi Gaeri" (Japanese: ヨミガエリ)	Directed by : Ayaka Noro; Storyboarded by : Masao Suzuki	Natsumi Moriuchi	January 29, 2023	December 1, 2025
62	The Strange Floor; Transliteration: "Maboroshi no Kai" (Japanese: 幻ノ階)	Directed by : Kohei Hatano; Storyboarded by : Morio Hatano	Hiroshi Yamaguchi	February 5, 2023	December 1, 2025
63	Gluttony; Transliteration: "Bōshoku" (Japanese: 暴食)	Directed by : Tomohiro Matsukawa; Storyboarded by : Hiroki Fukuoka	Masashi Sogo	February 12, 2023	December 1, 2025
64	The Call; Transliteration: "Yobigoe" (Japanese: 呼ビ声)	Ippo Takatoya	Natsumi Moriuchi	February 19, 2023	December 1, 2025
65	The Black Zone of Death; Transliteration: "Kuro no Kesshiken" (Japanese: 黒ノ決死圏)	Yōko Ikeda	Toshiaki Satō	February 26, 2023	December 1, 2025
66	The Black Dragon of Destruction; Transliteration: "Hametsu no Shikkokuryū" (Japanese: 破滅ノ漆黒竜)	Directed by : Nozomu Shishido; Storyboarded by : Morio Hatano, Nozomu Shishido, Hiroki Fukuoka & Akihiro Nakamura	Masashi Sogo	March 19, 2023	December 1, 2025
67	The Devourer of All; Transliteration: "Subete o Kurau Mono" (Japanese: スベテヲ喰ラウモノ)	Directed by : Ryō Nanba; Storyboarded by : Ippo Takatoya, Hiroki Fukuoka, Masato Mitsuka & Akihiro Nakamura	Masashi Sogo	March 26, 2023	December 1, 2025

== Movies ==
To date, a total of nineteen films have been released based on the franchise.

Title	Originally released
Digimon Adventure	March 6, 1999
Digimon Adventure: Our War Game!	March 4, 2000
Digimon Adventure 02: Part 1: Digimon Hurricane Touchdown!! / Part 2: Supreme Evolution!! The Golden Digimentals	July 8, 2000
Digimon Adventure 3D: Digimon Grand Prix!	July 20, 2000
Digimon: The Movie	October 6, 2000
Digimon Adventure 02: Revenge of Diaboromon	March 3, 2001
Digimon Tamers: Battle of Adventurers	July 14, 2001
Digimon Tamers: Runaway Locomon	March 2, 2002
Digimon Frontier: Island of Lost Digimon	July 20, 2002
Digital Monster X-Evolution	January 3, 2005
Digimon Savers 3D: The Digital World in Imminent Danger!	July 8, 2006
Digimon Savers: Ultimate Power! Activate Burst Mode!!	December 9, 2006
Digimon Adventure tri. Chapter 1: Reunion	November 21, 2015
Digimon Adventure tri. Chapter 2: Determination	March 12, 2016
Digimon Adventure tri. Chapter 3: Confession	September 24, 2016
Digimon Adventure tri. Chapter 4: Loss	February 25, 2017
Digimon Adventure tri. Chapter 5: Coexistence	September 30, 2017
Digimon Adventure tri. Chapter 6: Future	May 5, 2018
Digimon Adventure: Last Evolution Kizuna	February 21, 2020
Digimon Adventure 02: The Beginning	October 27, 2023

== OVA ==
=== Digimon Adventure 20th Memorial Story ===
No.	Title	Release
1	"To Sora"; Transliteration: "Sora e" (Japanese: 空へ)	November 22, 2019
2	"Hole in the Heart"; Transliteration: "Kokoro no ana" (Japanese: 心の穴)	February 21, 2020
3	"Medical Student Joe Kido"; Transliteration: "Igaku-sei Kido Jō" (Japanese: 医学生・城戸丈)	July 10, 2020
4	"The Desired Jogress Evolution"; Transliteration: "Akogare no Jogress Shinka" (Japanese: あこがれのジョグレス進化)	October 16, 2020
5	"The Shibuya-ish Heroic Saga of Pump and Gotsu"; Transliteration: "Panpu to Gotsu no Shibuya-kei buyū-den" (Japanese: パンプとゴツの渋谷系武勇伝)	December 25, 2020
