= Mysticons =

- Genre: Action; Science fantasy; Magic; Kids & Family
- Created by: Sean Jara
- Directed by: Matt Ferguson
- Voices of: Alyson Court; Ana Sani; Evany Rosen; Nicki Burke
- Theme music composer: Danny Craig
- Opening theme: "Mysticons Theme Song"; by Melanie Dawn
- Ending theme: "Mysticons Theme Song" (instrumental)
- Composer: Christian Szczesniak
- Countries of origin: Canada; United States
- Original language: English
- No. of seasons: 2
- No. of episodes: 40 (list of episodes)

Production
- Executive producers: Doug Murphy; Irene Weibel; Noel Bright; Steven A. Cohen
- Producers: Sean Jara; Susie Gallo
- Running time: 21-22 minutes
- Production companies: Nelvana Limited; Topps Animation; Corus Entertainment

Original release
- Network: Nickelodeon (U.S., 2017); Nicktoons (U.S., 2018); YTV (Canada)
- Release: August 28, 2017 – September 15, 2018

Mysticons is an animated television series that aired from August 28, 2017, to September 15, 2018. A collaboration between Nelvana and Topps, it was created by Sean Jara, who also served as executive story editor and producer.

In August 2018, Jara confirmed on Twitter that Mysticons had not been renewed for any episodes beyond its initial 40-episode production order. The final episode, "Age of Dragons", aired on September 15, 2018, in the U.S. and September 23, 2018, in Canada.

== Plot ==
Set in the realm of Gemina and its capital, Drake City, the series follows the adventures of Arkayna, princess of Gemina, and Emerald, Zarya, and Piper, who are chosen by the Dragon Disk to become the second generation of legendary heroes known as the Mysticons. They embark on a quest to find four spellbooks and animal-themed bracers of mystical power to form the Codex, which will give them the power needed to save Gemina from Dreadbane, who seeks to release Necrafa, leader of the Spectral Hand and Queen of the Undead, and turned King Darius and Queen Gabyna Goodfey to stone. Once Necrafa is freed, she betrays Dreadbane and banishes him to another dimension where Imani Firewing, the original Mysticon Dragon Mage, banished her a millennium ago.

They encounter allies and adversaries while learning that Arkayna has a long-lost fraternal twin sister, who is assumed to be the Astromancer Proxima Starfall. However, she is revealed to have been a scapegoat and proxy for Zarya Moonwolf, the second Mysticon Ranger and Arkanya's true twin sister. They also learn of a prophecy foretelling Gemina's destruction:

When the twin stars unite
The spectral beast will take flight
Its roars will heard a new dark age
And the realm will be
Purged by the dragon's rage

Necrafa fuses with the Spectral Dragon, but Arkayna and Zarya obtain two rings that transform them into the "Twin Dragon," allowing them to destroy her and the Spectral Dragon, leaving half of her mask behind.

The Mysticons are called back to their heroic duties to destroy Necrafa's mask, which Proxima wears and becomes their adversary after feeling used by Zarya and betrayed by Arkayna for abandoning her for Zarya. She becomes the new leader of the Spectral Hand with help from the Astromancers, whom she places under her control as the Spectromancers, and creates the Dark Codex by corrupting the Dragon Disk. To help her get revenge on the Mysticons, she creates the Vexicons, which are similar to the Mysticons.

Realizing that the mask is controlling her, Proxima attempts to throw it into the Rift of Ruin, but it takes full control of her and prepares to destroy Gemina. With Tazma's help, the Mysticons enter her mind to find a spell that will free her from the mask's influence and Arkayna realizes that she failed to be there for Proxima when she needed her most. With Proxima free, Arkayna saves her from being killed by Mallory, who dons the mask before leaving with the Vexicons.

On the island, the Vexicons prepare for the arrival of the Spectral Hand while Proxima explains its origins, as well as those of Necrafa and Dreadbane, before undoing the spell she cast on the Astromancers. Nova Terron reveals the existence of magical lances that could enhance the power of the Mysticons' bracers and allow them to destroy the Spectral Hand forever, but that the plans to create them are in Queen Gabyna's necklace. When Dreadbane refuses to reverse the curse on Darius and Gabyna, the Mysticons head to the palace to retrieve their petrified forms, but are captured by Mallory. However, Dreadbane saves her, as well as Darius and Gabyna, using the last of his powers to revive them before dying.

After receiving the plans, the Mysticons create the Lance of Justice in the dwarves' forge room and Queen Goodfey accompanies them to confront the Spectral Hand, which emerges from the ancient column of ruins that had imprisoned it. Realizing that the Spectral Hand may be vulnerable to the Dragons of Light, Zarya returns with them to Dragonhenge, where King Valmuk tells them that the only way for the Dragons of Light to reach full adulthood in time is to go to the Ever Realm, where time flows faster. Upon reaching the Valley of Shooting Stars, they are caught by the Vexicons and Eartha has a change of heart and refuses to destroy the dragon eggs. Using their dragon mounts and the power of the bracers, the Mysticons destroy the Spectral Hand and free those it had imprisoned.

With Gemina at peace, life returns to normal as the Mysticons continue their duties defending the realm. Emerald and Eartha live together in Ruddix Hollow, King Darius and Queen Gabyna resume their royal duties and have the Vexicons imprisoned, Nova Terron resigns as master of the Astromancer Academy to be with his girlfriend Geraldine and gives the position to Proxima as compensation for inadvertently helping to ruin her life, presenting her with the Codex and the Dragon Disk.

== Cast and characters ==
- Alyson Court as Princess Arkayna Goodfey/Mysticon Dragon Mage
- Nicki Burke as Zarya Moonwolf/Mysticon Ranger
- Ana Sani as Piper Willowbrook/Mysticon Striker
- Evany Rosen as Emerald Zirconia Goldenbraid/Mysticon Knight
- Amy Matysio as Mallory
- Katie Griffin as Kitty Boon
- Joshua Graham as Kasey Boon
- David Berni as King Gawayne
- Dan Lett as Nova Terron
- Michelle Monteith as Tazma Grimm
- Stacey DePass as Proxima Starfall
- Deven Christian Mack as Malvaron Grimm, Ferrus Goldenbraid, and General Dreadbane
- Linda Kash as Kymraw and Queen Gabyna Goodfey
- Doug Hadders as Douglaphius "Doug" Hadderstorm
- Valerie Buhagiar as Queen Necrafa
- Julie Lemieux as Serena Snakecharmer
- Athena Karkanis as Imani Firewing and Quasarla
- Cory Doran as Neeko
- Paul Soles as Barnabas Dinklelot (3 episodes)
- Denise Oliver (Note: Also known as Denise Shaw) as Citrine Goldenbraid and Queen Truefin
- Cedric Smith as King Valmuk (Note: Referred to as "Dragon King" in the credits)
- Neil Crone as Malachite Goldenbraid
- Robert Tinkler as Halite Goldenbraid
- Talia Pearl as Princess Kelpie Truefin ("Clash of the Tridents" and "The Mask")
- Jamie Watson as Captain Kaos ("Mutiny Most Fowl")
- Catherine Disher as Hortensia Q. Sparklebottom (3 episodes)
- Barbara Mamabolo as Vesper
- Bahia Watson as Kasha (10 episodes)
- Alana Bridgewater as Eartha (10 episodes)
- Patrick McKenna as King Darius (7 episodes)
- Stephany Seki as Willa

== Production ==
At MIPTV on April 7, 2013, Nelvana alongside Topps announced the series and pitched it to potential broadcasters with Topps owner at that time Michael Eisner stepping in via his The Tornante Company label to co-produce and Topps to handle the trading card line. Sean Jara was onboard to work on the series which consisted of 26 episodes at that time.

In June 2015, it was announced that the show would start production later that year and that Nickelodeon would be the global broadcast partner for the series. At the same time, both companies were said to be working with Topps, while Eisner and Noel Bright of the latter are executive producers, as are Colin Bohm, Doug Murphy, and Irene Weibel of Corus Entertainment. By June 2016, the show had been picked up for 40 episodes. Weibel, as the manager of the development slate at Nelvana, served as executive producer as a result on Mysticons and other shows and projects produced by the studio like Mike the Knight, Lucky Duck and Hotel Transylvania. In addition, Jara would be the show's creator, writer, and executive story editor. The show was later promoted as a "genre-defining action series" before its release.

=== Themes ===
The show is female-centered, as opposed to "many male-centered series" for younger viewers while focusing on magic, superpowers, and the classic good vs. evil dichotomy. As such, the series has elves primarily in the form of 110-year-old protagonist Piper Willowbrook, whose elvish name is Pyperia Ashryn Elvaniski, but also in the case of Hortensia Q. Sparklebottom, and princesses like Arkana Goodfey and Zarya Moonwolf, who are both protagonists who were separated at birth. Furthermore, the series has a focus on the undead For instance, villain and undead sorceress Queen Necrafa is a lich, which is a type of undead creature. Her power is suggested to originate from the spectral hand, a reign of evil that started from a witch seeking district powers. Due to the focus on magic and fantasy, the series has been compared to the upcoming Crunchyroll Original, High Guardian Spice by some critics. The series was promoted by Nelvana as focusing on "girls’ strength, power, and courage" while other reviewers said it promotes "strong, confident, smart and funny girls." One reviewer described the first graphic novel offshoot based on the series as a "contemporary urban fantasy" which can also apply to the animated series.

==== LGBT representation ====
In October 2017, it was reported that a kiss between two female characters, Zarya Moonwolf and Kitty Boon, on the show was in danger of being cut. Despite this, the show showed the "development of a female-female romance," between Zarya, a protagonist, and her childhood friend, Kitty, known as "MoonBoon," culminating in romantic moments. In August 2018, the show's creator, Sean Jara, confirmed the two as a couple, noting that only one version of the episode was created and that the show's creative team fought for a kiss, but lost, even though they managed "to keep the integrity of the love story." Jara also said there is a "beautiful love story" between Zarya and Kitty in the show, referring to the interactions between the two characters in episode 37 ("The Princess and the Pirate"), stated the importance of showing "love between LGBTQ characters on TV," and said that the kiss was cut from the episode because of "systemic homophobia" in the kids' television industry, crediting Rebecca Sugar for making strides. He opined on the continual battle for more LGBTQ representation, cited an Entertainment Weekly article about LGBTQ representation in cartoons, (Note: Specifically an article titled "From Steven Universe to Voltron: The fight to bring LGBTQ characters to kids' shows" by Nick Romano.) and praised the battles for more representation which go on behind the scenes. He said this saying that Nick did not pick up the show for more than 40 episodes and, once again, confirmed Kitty and Zarya as a lesbian couple. In September, Jara said that they treated the relationship between Kitty and Zarya "like all the other relationships in the show." He added that while he was nervous and aware of possible roadblocks, Matt Ferguson, the show's director, supported it, as did his writing team. Ferguson argued that pushback came from not from people who were "evil" but rather from those who were "trying to do the best job at their particular job."

In June 2021, Abbey White of Insider reported that when the show's studio changed the series to center on four teenage girls, Jara brought in more women and queer writers to the show's writing team, who were "responsible for building out an arc between lesbian characters Zarya Moonwolf and Kitty Boon," which fans gave the shipping name of "MoonBoon." Jara recalled that he sent in the script for a kiss of the two character to the show's studios, and Nickelodeon, and fellow producers working on the show. But, the moment never aired, despite support from Nickelodeon, because a partner was concerned that the storyline was not "age-appropriate" for young viewers. As a result, despite Jara's attempts to convince the partner, the creative team had to scrap the kiss, and almost had to unravel the whole love story between Zarya and Kitty, but Jara fought for its inclusion. In the article, Nelvana confirmed that the decision to remove the kiss was made during production of the show's Season Two, and said that they were committed to having "creative storytelling with diversity and inclusion at the forefront" when it comes to BIPOC and LGBTQ representation."

=== Staff and cast ===
From 2014 to 2017, Stevie Vallance was based in Toronto as the Voice Director of the series. The principal voice cast includes Alyson Court as Arkayna Goodfey, (Note: She also voices minor supporting characters like the unnamed Elven Daughter and Binky, along with the magical sinister object known as "The Mask.") Evany Rosen as Emerald Goldenbraid, Nicki Burke as Zarya Moonwolf, and Ana Sani as Piper Willowbrook. In terms of recurring characters, David Berni was Gawayne the Great, Katie Griffin was Kitty Boon, Linda Kash was Queen Goodfey and Kymraw, and Dan Lett was Nova Terron.

In March 2018, the show was nominated for various awards at the 6th Canadian Screen Awards. This included one for Matt Ferguson, who directed the episode "Scourge of the Seven Skies" and another for Sean Jara, who wrote the episode "Sisters in Arms." While Ferguson did not get an award, Jara won an award for his writing on the aforementioned episode. The following year, another episode Jara wrote, "The Princess and the Pirate," was nominated for an award as the 7th Canadian Screen Awards. The same year, Ana Sani was nominated for the "Outstanding Performance – Female Voice" ACTRA Award for her role in the episode "The Edge of Two Morrows." Also that year, Elize Morgan, a writer who worked on Mysticons, would be a juror for the Toronto Animation Arts Festival International. Apart from Morgan, Jocelyn Geddie, Steph Kaliner, and Corey Liu were writers on the show.

=== Character design ===
Some stated that some characters may be inspired by past animations, like She-Ra: Princess of Power, with Dreadbane looking like Hordak and Choko looking like Kowl. Others stated that the series tapped into the "magical girl revival."

=== Music ===
In March 2018 the show was nominated for three awards at the 6th Canadian Screen Awards. One of these was for Christian Szczesniak's music in the episode "The Coronation." In November of the 2018 it was reported that singer Dulce Lopez sang the Spanish language version of the Mysticons theme song. In January 2020, the Canadian pop supergroup Girl Pow-R was handpicked to re-create, and sing, the show's theme song.

== Episodes ==
Season	Episodes	Originally released	
Season	Episodes	First released	Last released
1	20	August 28, 2017	February 10, 2018
2	20	February 17, 2018	September 15, 2018

== Promotion and release ==
Mysticons was originally aimed at boys but switched its focus to girls aged 6 to 11 during the development process. Nelvana's Andrew Kerr explained in 2016 that the show's developers agreed that "at this moment in time the project would be better served if we had female protagonists."

On June 16, 2018, Universal Pictures Home Entertainment and Elevation Pictures released the first DVD volume in Canada containing episodes 1–6 on June 19, 2018, under the name "New Heroes Rise." In August of that year, Lisa Godfrey, Vice-President of original content of Corus, used the show as an example, noting that not only do they make money "from a U.S. broadcast deal with Nickelodeon," merchandising sales, partnerships with companies like Burger King and other money from owning the intellectual property related to the series, saying this model is profitable.

== Telecast ==
In mid-August 2017, Nickelodeon unveiled the series with a trailer and "character featurettes." Then, on the week starting August 28, 2017, Mysticons premiered on Nickelodeon, in the U.S., through a five-day event over the week, before moving to its regular Sunday morning timeslot. Mysticons then began airing on Nicktoons on August 30. Premieres moved to that network with the show's second airing season on January 13, 2018. Reruns also aired on the Nick Jr. Channel and TeenNick. During the show's entire run, it was broadcast by Nickelodeon in the U.S., on Nicktoons in Central and Eastern Europe, and on Nick Jr. It also airs on CITV, the children's television strand of ITV in the United Kingdom, by Nickelodeon in Canada, Nicktoons in Germany, and Nickelodeon in Spain and Portugal, and on Nicktoons in Poland from 2018 to Present.

In Canada, the series premiered on YTV through a similar five-day event on August 28, 2017 before moving to its Sunday timeslot on September 3, 2017, replacing the series Nerds and Monsters on The Zone programming block. Repeats began airing on Nickelodeon and Teletoon on September 9. In the French-language Canada, a five-day preview aired on Télétoon between September 4 and 8, before moving to its regular slot on September 9. In October 2017, the show returned to Nickelodeon in the United States.

== Printed media and merchandise ==
Prior to the show's debut, Nelvana launched a YouTube channel for Mysticons on July 19, 2017. The web content was produced by Blue Ant Media.

Since the animated show aired on Nickelodeon, on August 28, 2017, an ever-expanding series of graphic novels/comic books have been released once or twice a year. Unlike other popular shows and graphic novels (W.I.T.C.H., Avatar: The Last Airbender, Avatar: The Legend of Korra) none have any titles but is merely seen as the volume number. Volume 1 was released at that time, followed by Volume 2 was on May 21, 2019, and Volume 3 in late 2019, with each depicting original adventures that never occurred in the animated series. Then, in October 2017, Nelvana launched the "Piper Parkour" browser game and the free-to-play iOS and Android Mysticons: Secrets of Gemina mobile game. In December 2017, a second browser game, "Arkayna Attack" was launched, followed by "Em's Mayhem" in February 2018 and "Cover of Night" in March 2018. All five were developed by Relish Interactive. Later in 2017, Playmates Toys released a Mysticons toyline. The Topps Company published a trading card game concurrently. A Burger King kids meal promotion ran in the United States and Canada in February and March 2018.

Macmillan Publishers launched a Mysticons novel series on June 19, 2018, with the first two titles being the show adaptation Quest for the Codex and the original adventure tale The Secret of the Fifth Mysticon. The second set, the novelization Prophecy of Evil and the original story The Stolen Magic were released on August 28, 2018. A third original novel, titled The Diamond Curse was released on January 8, 2019. Alongside the text versions, Macmillan also released audiobooks of their original stories narrated by members of the show's voice cast.

On August 15, 2018, Dark Horse Comics launched an ongoing series of graphic novels by Kate Leth and Megan Levens. Later, a miniseries of four chapter books, featuring one of the second generation of the four Mysticons as the central character was released. Emerald's tale is set sometime in the first season; whereas Arkayna and Zarya's are set in the second and final season, as both mention of them being long-lost fraternal twin sisters. Three books out four were released: The Secret of the Fifth Mysticon (featuring Emerald "Em", the second Mysticon Knight), The Stolen Magic (featuring Zarya, the second Mysticon Ranger), and The Diamond Curse (featuring Arkayna, the second Mysticon Dragon Mage).

== Reception ==
Melissa Camacho of Common Sense Media praised the series as fun, but warned parents that there is "lots of fantasy violence" and some "dark images" which might "scare younger kids," but that it contains "magical creature companions," trainer, and dark forces that young fans of anime are drawn toward. She also stated that the series is not educational, but offers an "entertaining alternative to the many male-centered series" produced for those of this age group. In contrast, The Encyclopedia of Science Fiction contributor Steven Pearce gave a positive review, stating that the three story arcs of the series centers on a different villain, and stated that even though the series is set in a futuristic city, "noir tendencies of urban fantasy are avoided" with cultural influence of Earth still present, even as there are sci-fi elements. Pearce also pointed out that the show is "more action-orientated" than most shows which target young girls, stated that while the animation budget wasn't big, it was "used imaginatively" and says that while the story is fast-moving, it gains strength as it moved along, resulting in a "fun, exciting series."
