= Rocket Monkeys =

Canadian animated TV series (2013-2016)

- Also known as: The Rocket Monkeys
- Genre: Science fiction comedy Toilet humour
- Created by: Dan Abdo; Jason Patterson
- Developed by: Alex Galatis; Mark Evestaff
- Directed by: J. Falconer
- Creative director: Mark Evestaff
- Voices of: Seán Cullen; Mark Edwards; David Berni; Jamie Watson; Mark McKinney
- Opening theme: "Rocket Monkeys" performed by Tony Daniels
- Ending theme: "Rocket Monkeys" performed by David Berni (as YAY-OK)
- Composers: Steve D'Angelo and Terry Tompkins (for Eggplant LF); Jeffrey Morrow
- Country of origin: Canada
- Original language: English
- No. of seasons: 3
- No. of episodes: 66 (130 segments) (list of episodes)

Production
- Executive producers: Ira Levy; Peter Williamson; Joan Lambur; Michael McGuigan (season 3); Nat Abraham (season 3); For Hornet Films: Dan Abdo; Michael Feder; Jason Patterson
- Producer: Mark Evestaff
- Running time: 22 minutes (11 minutes per segment); 44 minutes ("Terrors and Tiaras")
- Production companies: Breakthrough Entertainment; Atomic Cartoons

Original release
- Network: Teletoon
- Release: January 10, 2013 – November 23, 2016

Rocket Monkeys is a Canadian animated television series created by Dan Abdo and Jason Patterson for Teletoon. It premiered in Canada on January 10, 2013, and aired its last new episode on November 23, 2016, before entering reruns. Breakthrough Entertainment produced the series in association with Hornet Films and Atomic Cartoons. 66 episodes were produced.

Although the show received mixed-to-negative reviews from critics and audiences, it won several Canadian Screen Awards, including Best Animated Program in both 2015 and 2016.

== Plot ==
Two anthropomorphic monkey astronauts, named Gus and Wally, work at the GASI Headquarters. They're not quick-witted, but since they are the only ones around, they are called upon to go into space and carry out different kinds of important missions, including battling rogue black holes and aliens. Other members of the brothers' crew include bossy astrophysicist Dr. Chimpsky, who gives the monkeys their assignments; YAY-OK, a devoted robot that is slightly outdated and is the brothers' only hope to help keep them on course; and Inky, a space alien artist who communicates through his ink drawings.

== Characters ==
- Gus Monkey (voiced by Seán Cullen) is Wally's older brother, who has brown fur and a blue spacesuit, and is considered the smarter of the two. He wants nothing more than to be a hero, but he can't always put aside his monkey instincts. The closest thing the ship has to a captain, he takes being a GASI cadet very seriously — well, when he feels like it.
- Wally Monkey (voiced by Mark Edwards) is Gus's younger brother, who has yellow fur and a red spacesuit. Poorly-groomed yet somehow adorable, Wally would rather be playing Banana Blasters or organizing his expired pudding collection than jetting off on some crazy expedition. If there's one thing Wally's good at, it's being a monkey — he can howl and fling with the best of them.
- Yay-OK (voiced by David Berni) is Wally and Gus's Italian-accented robot companion that helps them on their adventures through space. There's nothing this robot wouldn't do for his beloved monkeys — after all, he's programmed that way. He's quite the charmer, too — from the fridge to the blender to the vending machine, there isn't a ladybot on board whose circuits he hasn't made beep a little faster.
- Dr. Chimpsky (voiced by Jamie Watson) is the leader of GASI Headquarters. He assigns the Monkeys their critical missions (which sometimes include getting him more ice when his drink gets too warm) and does his best to keep them on track when they get distracted.
- Inky (voiced by Mark Edwards) is a light purple octopus-like alien and an artist who communicates through his incredible ink drawings. Whether he's a member of the crew or just unbearably cute is anybody's guess. But either way, his artistic talents make him super fun to have around.
- Lord Peel (voiced by Mark McKinney) is an alien shaped like a banana peel that is the main antagonist of the series, whom the monkeys constantly mistake for food. Before the events of the series, he was a noble businessman. But then the Rocket Monkeys began to crave him, and he's been trying to get revenge on them for trying to eat him and especially for forcing him into the dark side.
- Nefarious (voiced by Seán Cullen) is a pink alien with large head lives in a prison asteroid, which he tries to escape in most episodes in which he appears.
- SLO-MO (voiced by Teresa Pavlinek) is Nefarious's robot minion. Some episodes show her having (requited or not) an infatuation with Yay-OK.
- Deep Space Dave (voiced by Seán Cullen) is a green alien superhero who always relies on his fans

== Production and development ==
The development of the series began in 2006. The two protagonists, Gus and Wally, were inspired by the complicity of the two creators of the series, Dan Abdo and Jason Patterson, friends since high school. Jason and Dan did some animation tests and sketches, which they showed to Michael Feder. Feder, a partner of Hornet Inc., then helped in the development of Rocket Monkeys under the label of Hornet Films. In 2007, the animation division of their studio closed. 4Kids Entertainment then volunteered to take care of the pre-production of the series from spring 2008.

At the beginning of 2012, pre-production was completed, and Atomic Cartoons in Vancouver took over the animation.

== Episodes ==
Season	Episodes	Segments	Originally released	
Season	Episodes	Segments	First released	Last released
1	26	52	January 10, 2013	April 2, 2014
2	14	27	November 5, 2014	October 25, 2015
3	26	51	March 1, 2016	November 23, 2016

== Broadcast and home media ==
Rocket Monkeys was broadcast in Canada on the channel Teletoon from January 10, 2013, to November 23, 2016. The series is available for digital per-episode purchase in Canada, but not in the U.S. As of 2021, the series (except some episodes) can be seen on the completely free streaming service, Tubi.

On February 21, 2013, Nickelodeon announced that it and its global networks had acquired the broadcast rights to the series, including for the U.S., though its history on that network was marked with several shifts. It premiered on the channel March 4, 2013, but then shifted over to sister network Nicktoons due to low ratings and waning promotion on Nickelodeon, before the network dropped it entirely in May 2014, leaving it off US airwaves for just over three years. The second season finally premiered in the U.S. on July 3, 2017, as part of the over-the-air KidsClick syndicated children's block and aired until the block shut down in 2019. In the United Kingdom, it premiered on Nicktoons in 2013 and ended sometime in 2017, but repeats aired from December 2017 to 28 January 2018. In Southeast Asia, Australia and Poland, it aired on Disney XD.

== Reception ==
Rocket Monkeys received a mixed-to-negative reception, with critics and audiences criticizing the show for its characters and panning its excessive use of toilet humor, although the animation was praised.

Emily Ashby of Common Sense Media rates a show two stars out of five, saying that the show was "tries to be edgy and clever with its humor, but gross-out laughs usually dominate the content." She describes the main characters, Gus and Wally, as "loud, rude, and chronically dim," who are "also persistent in the worst possible way, forever trying to one-up each other or get what they want by whining about it." Overall, she calls the show "hectic and tiresome."

Despite the critical reception, the show won at the Canadian Screen Awards for the Best Animated Program or Series and Best Writing in an Animated Program or Series (Dan Abdo) in both 2015 and 2016, plus, it was nominated for Best Performance in an Animated Program or Series (Mark Robert Edwards) in 2014, and, in the same year, it won at the 10th Annual Shaw Rocket Prize alongside Justin Time and If I Had Wings.
