= Strawberry Shortcake: Berry in the Big City =

Canadian animated children's web and television series

- Genre: Adventure; Comedy; Musical; Fantasy; Slice of life
- Created by: Michael Vogel
- Based on: Characters by American Greetings
- Developed by: Michael Vogel
- Written by: Michael Vogel
- Directed by: Matt Ferguson
- Starring: Ana Sani; Andrea Libman; Bahia Watson; Diana Kaarina; Margarita Valderrama; Tabitha St. Germain; Vincent Tong
- Theme music composer: Daniel Ingram
- Opening theme: "She's Strawberry Shortcake" by Ashleigh Ball (featuring Vincent Tong)
- Ending theme: "She's Strawberry Shortcake" by Ashleigh Ball (instrumental)
- Composers: Daniel Ingram; Trevor Hoffmann
- Country of origin: Canada
- Original language: English
- No. of seasons: 3
- No. of episodes: 60 (120 segments)

Production
- Executive producers: Michael Vogel; Stephanie Betts; Anne Loi; Josh Scherba; Denise Tanchanco; Amir Nasrabadi; Steven DeNure; Ken Faier; Asaph Fipke; Kirsten Newlands; Mike Young; Jennifer Korba-Gill
- Producers: Denise Tanchanco; Marianne Lorraine Sambilay; Jennifer Korba-Gill
- Editors: Mat Garneau; Mike Hillmer
- Running time: 11 minutes (4–8 minutes per segment); 44 minutes (specials only)
- Production company: WildBrain Studios

Original release
- Network: YouTube; Family Jr. (Canada)
- Release: September 18, 2021 – May 10, 2024

Strawberry Shortcake: Berry in the Big City is a Canadian children's animated web series based on the Strawberry Shortcake franchise, produced by WildBrain Studios and premiered on YouTube on September 18, 2021 and later on Family Jr. on October 17 in Canada. The series follows an aspiring baker Strawberry who arrives in Big Apple City to get her big break and has adventures with new friends.

== Synopsis ==
Strawberry moves to Big Apple City, a common location for bakers starting their careers. Accompanied by her cat, Custard, she works alongside Orange Blossom, Lime Chiffon, Lemon Meringue, and Blueberry Muffin, along with their pets. The group operates food trucks and bakes goods together.

== Characters ==
=== Main ===
- Strawberry Shortcake (voiced by Ana Sani): The main protagonist of the series, she is an optimistic, kind, friendly, and energetic girl who wants to become the best baker in the Berryworks factory and Big Apple City. She is mostly friendly with everyone and is close friends with Orange Blossom, Lemon Meringue, Lime Chiffon, Blueberry Muffin, and later in season 2, Bread Pudding, Raspberry Tart, and Sour Grapes. She is the niece of Aunt Praline, and she also runs the baking truck in the Berryworks, which is given to her as a gift by her aunt. She has a pet cat named Custard. Strawberry Shortcake has long reddish-pink hair that goes down to her knees.
- Orange Blossom (voiced by Bahia Watson): Strawberry's athletic best friend, who is a sporty tomboy. She is energetic, kind, and always helps Strawberry anytime, whenever she needs help in her food truck or with anything else that she needs for her baking business in the Berryworks. She runs a smoothie stand in the Berryworks. Her pet is a dog called Pupcake.
- Lemon Meringue (voiced by Andrea Libman, reprising her role from Strawberry Shortcake's Berry Bitty Adventures): One of Strawberry's best friends, who is a know-it-all, and is also a tomboy like her friend Orange. She is the best friend/partner of Lime Chiffon and they run a lemonade-limeade truck in the Berryworks. She is also a professional mechanic who helps fix Strawberry's oven in her food truck and fixes everything else in the Berryworks. Her pet is a frog called Frappé.
- Lime Chiffon (voiced by Margaritta Valderrama): Another one of Strawberry's best friends, who is sweet and kind and the best friend/partner of Lemon Meringue. She has two dads, and runs a lemonade-limeade truck with her best friend/partner, Lemon Meringue, in the Berryworks. She is also good friends with Bread Pudding. Her pet is a parrot called Parfait.
- Blueberry Muffin (voiced by Diana Kaarina): Another one of Strawberry's best friends, who is free-spirited, calm, and kind. She has a spiritual mom and a younger brother and she also runs the ice cream shop in the Berryworks. She also has a sibling rivalry with her younger brother at times as he always tries to annoy her and her friends, but she loves him nonetheless. Her pet is a mouse called Cheesecake.

=== Recurring ===
- Bread Pudding (voiced by Chirag Naik): In the first season of the series, who later becomes one of the main cast members, he is serious and is also arrogant, selfish, and strict. He is a disciplined individual who works as the coordinator and overseer of the Berryworks and is good friends with Raspberry Tart and Sour Grapes as they also work for him and is the one who wants and tries to have Strawberry to be kicked out of the Berryworks because she is not a talented baker just like her family. He always tries his best to be better than Strawberry at everything along with the help and assistance of his two friends, Raspberry and Sour, who help him in his schemes too, but always fails, and as Strawberry always tells them that she is unbeatable. At the end of season one and as of season two, he, alongside his two friends, Raspberry and Sour become good friends with Strawberry, and also becomes good friends with Lime Chiffon at the end of season one and as of season two. As of season three, he still works at the Berryworks as the factory's main coordinator and overseer and is joined by two other coordinators/overseers who are twins and are also very strict just like him, Cheese Strudel and Cherry Streusel, and he also works for the current and new owner of the Berryworks, Crabapple Jam. He is also the son of the Berryworks' original owner, Figgy Pudding.
- Raspberry Tart (voiced by Tabitha St. Germain): The main antagonist in the first season of the series (along with Bread Pudding).
- Sour Grapes (voiced by Meg Roe): The secondary antagonist in the first season of the series.
- Huckleberry Pie (voiced by Vincent Tong): A friend of Strawberry's who she meets in the Funnelcake subway station, he started off as a street musician, but moved to the Berryworks to perform there after befriending Strawberry. Huckleberry is fairly dense but has a laid-back and street-savvy personality.

== Production ==
When Iconix Brand Group purchased the Strawberry Shortcake brand assets from American Greetings in 2015, until the Canadian company WildBrain (known at the time as DHX Media) acquired the band from Iconix in 2017, the Strawberry Shortcake series was originally revealed and developed since June of that year. Strawberry Shortcake: Berry in the Big City premiered on September 18, 2021 on YouTube.

A second season premiered on June 25, 2022.

A third season premiered on July 15, 2023 on the official Strawberry Shortcake YouTube channel.

=== Music ===
The series' background music and songs were composed by Daniel Ingram and Trevor Hoffmann, respectively.

=== Casting and voice acting ===
Voice casting and production were handled by Kozmic Sound and Supersonics Post Production, with Adrienne Lindsay as the series' voice director. Vogel and Ferguson and others participated in selecting voice actors, with WildBrain giving final approval. Ana Sani was cast as Strawberry Shortcake after Vogel. The series was recorded in Vancouver. Voice work was done after writing and before animation, with the animators providing direction. The songs were recorded with the dialogue.

== Episodes ==
=== Series overview ===
Season	Segments	Episodes	Originally released	
Season	Segments	Episodes	First released	Last released
1	40	20	September 18, 2021	June 11, 2022
2	38	20	June 25, 2022	March 18, 2023
3	38	20	July 15, 2023	May 10, 2024

=== Season 1 (2021–22) ===
No. overall	No. in season	Title	Written by	Storyboard by	Original release date
1	1	"Berry in the Big City"	Michael Vogel	Kaylea Chard; Chris Johnston	September 18, 2021
Strawberry Shortcake says goodbye to her hometown and moves in with her Aunt Praline in Big Apple City. She is ready to start baking, but her food truck is in bad shape, but soon finds some friends who will help her.
2a	2a	"Lemon's Explosive Oven!"	Michael Vogel	Brian Couglan; Grey White	September 25, 2021
Strawberry's business is booming but her oven is out of commission. Lemon Meringue is going to build her the oven of her dreams.
2b	2b	"Legend of the Spoon"	Michael Vogel	Brian Couglan; Grey White	October 2, 2021
Aunt Praline presents Strawberry Shortcake with their family's 'Lucky Spoon' and trains her to master the 'ways of the spoon'.
3a	3a	"No Ordinary Berry"	Michael Vogel; Alison Wong	Brian Couglan; Grey White	October 9, 2021
Strawberry Shortcake steps out of her comfort zone and explores everything that Big Apple City has to offer.
3b	3b	"Mean Berries"	Shannon McClung; Michael Vogel	Petra Popescu; Ashley Simpson	October 30, 2021
A jealous Raspberry Tart buys all of Strawberry Shortcake's baked goods and resells them using her own packaging.
4a	4a	"Ghost of Cupcakes Past"	Shannon McClung; Michael Vogel	Bob Baxter; Ashley Michelle Simpson	October 16, 2021
Raspberry Tart and her friends try to scare Strawberry Shortcake out of town, but the plan does not go quite as planned.
4b	4b	"Fright Fall"	Shannon McClung; Michael Vogel	Bob Baxter; Ashley Michelle Simpson	October 23, 2021
Strawberry Shortcake and her friends go to a party, but embarrassingly, Strawberry missed the memo about the dress code.
5a	5a	"It's My Purr-ty"	Meg Favreau; Shannon McClung	Bob Baxter; Ashley Michelle Simpson	November 6, 2021
Convinced that Strawberry Shortcake forgot her Birthday, Custard enlists the help of the other pets to help her out.
5b	5b	"The Great Gooseberry Chase"	Meg Favreau; Shannon McClung	Bob Baxter; Ashley Michelle Simpson	December 18, 2021
Strawberry Shortcake and Orange Blossom race to find the most important ingredient, but realize that friendship is more important.
6	6	"Berry Bounty Banquet"	Michael Vogel	Petra Popescu; Ashley Simpson	November 13, 2021
6	6	"Berry Bounty Banquet"	Michael Vogel	Grahaeme Cowie; Bob Baxter	November 20, 2021
Strawberry Shortcake and Aunt Praline prepare the perfect banquet for all their friends and family, but just as they arrive, disaster strikes. Strawberry Shortcake's friends and their families work together to save the banquet.
7a	7a	"Meet Huckleberry Pie"	Alison Wong; Julia Yorks	Grey White; Maca Gil	November 27, 2021
Strawberry Shortcake gets separated from Lime Chiffon while riding the Funnel System for the first time, but a new friend helps her find her way.
7b	7b	"Waiting for Genoise"	Alison Wong; Julia Yorks	Grey White; Maca Gil	December 25, 2021
Strawberry Shortcake accidentally gives everyday Grandma Buttermilk Beignet the five-star treatment after mistaking her for a food critic.
8a	8a	"Berry Merry Melody"	Michael Vogel; Rabiya Monsoor	Petra Popescu; Megan Willis	December 4, 2021
With the help from the berries, Huckleberry Pie creates the perfect Holiday gift: a customisable song he and the berries share together.
8b	8b	"Lemon's Name in Lights"	Michael Vogel; Rabiya Monsoor	Petra Popescu; Megan Willis	December 11, 2021
Lemon Meringue pulls out all the stops and decorates the Berryworks for a holiday celebration that the berries will never forget.
9a	9a	"New Year's Wish"	Julia Yorks	Alex Greychuk; Bob Baxter	December 28, 2021
It is New Years Eve and Strawberry Shortcake and her friends stay up until midnight to make their super special New Year's wishes.
9b	9b	"Will You Be My Lemontine"	Julia Yorks	Alex Greychuk; Bob Baxter	February 12, 2022
It is Sweetie Pie's Day and Lemon Meringue learns to show her friends she cares about them in her own special way.
10a	10a	"A Berryworks Mystery"	Shannon McClung; Michael Vogel	Bob Baxter; Megan Willis	January 8, 2022
While on a search with her friends to find their missing pets, Strawberry Shortcake hears about the legend of the Berryworks.
10b	10b	"Be Your Berry Best"	Shannon McClung; Michael Vogel	Bob Baxter; Megan Willis	January 15, 2022
Aunt Praline is taking Strawberry Shortcake to the fanciest restaurant in the city and Lime takes her dress shopping for the occasion.
11a	11a	"Robot Strawberry"	Shannon McClung; Julia Yorks	Alex Greychuk; Kirk Jorgenson	January 22, 2022
Strawberry Shortcake is swamped with all its orders. Lemon Meringue's Cakenator 6 is ready to help, but it may be a little too helpful.
11b	11b	"Blueberry Brain Freeze"	Shannon McClung; Julia Yorks	Alex Greychuk; Kirk Jorgenson	January 29, 2022
Blueberry Muffin struggles to create a new ice cream flavour to go with Strawberry Shortcake's new dessert, but then finds inspiration in the most unlikely of places.
12a	12a	"Who Stole the Pies"	Alison Wong; Meg Favreau	Sean Thornton; Cid Snyder	February 5, 2022
Lime Chiffon puts her detective skills to use and searches for the culprit that has been stealing Strawberry Shortcake's pies.
12b	12b	"The Golden Berry Competition"	Alison Wong; Meg Favreau	Sean Thornton; Cid Snyder	February 19, 2022
Everyone at the Berryworks competes to win the secret prize inside of the Golden Berry with an unlikely winner coming out on top.
13a	13a	"And the Golden Smoothie Goes to..."	Julia Yorks; Shannon McClung	Megan Willis; Elise Stevens	February 26, 2022
Orange Blossom is determined to win the Most Creative Smoothie trophy, and Blueberry Muffin is just the berry to help get her creative juices running.
13b	13b	"Mint-Interesting"	Julia Yorks; Shannon McClung	Megan Willis; Elise Stevens	March 5, 2022
Strawberry and friends work together to keep Clint – the overgrown mint plant – in line, but Blueberry Muffin does not make it easy.
14a	14a	"Keylime Time"	Rabiya Monsoor; Bita Joudaki	Elise Stevens; Sean Thornton	March 12, 2022
Strawberry Shortcake bakes up a special treat hoping to impress one of her idols, Kiki KeyLime, the star of "Bite in the City".
14b	14b	"Everyberry Needs Someberry Sometimes"	Rabiya Monsoor; Bita Joudaki	Elise Stevens; Sean Thornton	March 19, 2022
Strawberry Shortcake has a serious case of the sniffles, so her friends step up to help her bake for a charity bake sale.
15a	15a	"Working Out with Orange Blossom"	Alison Wong; Rabiya Monsoor	Cat Tang; Elise Stevens	March 26, 2022
Orange Blossom takes Strawberry Shortcake through an early morning boot camp to help her become the best berry she can be.
15b	15b	"Huck's New Job"	Alison Wong; Rabiya Monsoor	Cat Tang; Elise Stevens	April 2, 2022
Huckleberry Pie tries to work at all the food trucks, but it is just not his jam, so he decides to play to his strength instead.
16a	16a	"Dreamy Dessert"	Julia Yorks	Grey White; Megan Willis	April 9, 2022
Strawberry Shortcake dreams of the best cupcake recipe, but she cannot remember the last ingredient. Her friends are helpful and they try to find a way to remember what the ingredient is.
16b	16b	"Spring Cleaning"	Julia Yorks	Grey White; Megan Willis	April 16, 2022
Strawberry Shortcake and friends try to cut corners on cleaning day so that they can enjoy a surprise Lime Chiffon has waiting for them when they finish.
17a	17a	"Lucky Berry"	Michael Vogel; Shannon McClung	Grey White; Grahaeme Cowie	April 23, 2022
Strawberry Shortcake proves to her friends that her Lucky Spoon is indeed lucky.
17b	17b	"Johnnycake Cobbler's Sensational Sweetening Spritz"	Michael Vogel; Shannon McClung	Grey White; Grahaeme Cowie	April 30, 2022
Strawberry Shortcake and Raspberry Tart are not exactly friends, but when a swindling salesman, Johnnycake Cobbler comes to town, they put aside their differences and join forces to take him down.
18a	18a	"Strawberry Surprise"	Michael Vogel; Shannon McClung	Grey White; Sean Thornton	May 7, 2022
Strawberry Shortcake plans Raspberry Tart's Birthday Party after her friends don't come through.
18b	18b	"Bread Pudding's New BFF"	Michael Vogel; Shannon McClung	Grey White; Sean Thornton	May 14, 2022
Lime Chiffon's dad is a major fashion designer. Bread Pudding is a huge fan and butters up his "new bestie" Lime in order to meet him.
19a	19a	"Ice Cream Trouble"	Rodney Gozum; Julia Yorks	Megan Parker; Bob Baxter	May 21, 2022
The Dreamery Creamery malfunctions, but Blueberry Muffin is always able to find the silver-lining to any problem.
19b	19b	"Beat the Heat"	Rodney Gozum; Julia Yorks	Megan Parker; Bob Baxter	June 11, 2022
Strawberry and friends want to have a picnic, but a heat wave has hit Big Apple City. They must find a solution for this problem.
20	20	"Bake Off"	Shannon McClung; Michael Vogel	Cid Snyder; Megan Parker	May 28, 2022
20	20	"Bake Off"	Shannon McClung; Michael Vogel	Cid Snyder; Megan Parker	June 4, 2022
Part 1: Strawberry Shortcake wants to audition for Bite of the City, but the pressure of being perfect becomes the real challenge. Part 2: Strawberry Shortcake and Raspberry Tart face off on Bite of the City and their rivalry is taken to the next level.

=== Season 2 (2022–23) ===
No. overall	No. in season	Title	Written by	Storyboard by	Original release date
21	1	"A Berry Perfect Kind of Day"	Michael Vogel	Ashley Simpson; Cid Snyder	June 25, 2022
In Big Apple City, the Purple Pieman turns up at the Berryworks.
22a	2a	"Fruitleg Alley"	Shannon McClung; Julia Yorks	Stephanie Cruz; Paul Kassab	July 2, 2022
Strawberry Shortcake is in need of soursops but it is out of season. There is only one place in the city that could have it: the infamous Fruitleg Alley.
22b	2b	"Purple Protege"	Shannon McClung; Julia Yorks	Stephanie Cruz; Paul Kassab	July 9, 2022
The Purple Pieman is looking for his next protégé, but under the friendly gesture is a rotten intention.
23a	3a	"Scaryoke"	Rabiya Mansoor	Lazarino Baarde	October 8, 2022
Huckleberry Pie finds Fright Fall terrifying, but Strawberry Shortcake suggests him to focus on the fun instead of the frights.
23b	3b	"Save the Pumpkins"	Rabiya Mansoor	Lazarino Baarde	October 15, 2022
Strawberry Shortcake and friends are excited to carve their Fright Fall pumpkins, but Blueberry busts their plans.
24a	4a	"Deliveryberries"	Shannon McClung; Julia Yorks	Stephanie Cruz; Bob Baxter	July 30, 2022
Strawberry Shortcake and Raspberry Tart are swamped with orders and have no time to deliver them. Luckily they know just the berries to help them out.
24b	4b	"Traffic Jam"	Shannon McClung; Julia Yorks	Stephanie Cruz; Bob Baxter	September 24, 2022
Strawberry and friends are ecstatic to attend a food truck festival to sell cupcakes and ice cream, but on the way there they get stuck in traffic.
25a	5a	"The Big Foam Disaster!"	Shannon McClung; Julia Yorks	Cid Snyder; Ashley Simpson	August 13, 2022
Thanks to the Purple Pieman's careless littering, a domino effect of crazy events occurs throughout the Berryworks.
25b	5b	"Berry Bounty Bolt"	Shannon McClung; Julia Yorks	Cid Snyder; Ashley Simpson	November 19, 2022
Orange Blossom and her family are sharing their Berry Bounty Bolt tradition with their friends and family.
26a	6a	"All About Lemon"	Steph Garcia; Rodey Gozum	Katie Cordina; Bob Baxter	August 27, 2022
Strawberry Shortcake and Aunt Praline prepare the perfect banquet for all their friends and family, but just as they arrive, disaster strikes.
26b	6b	"Snow-Aisis"	Steph Garcia; Rodey Gozum	Katie Cordina; Bob Baxter	December 3, 2022
A snow storm has hit Apple City and Strawberry Shortcake is not happy about being stuck inside and unable to bake. She later gets an idea for this problem.
27a	7a	"Mission Unfrostable"	Shannon McClung; Michael Vogel	Paul Kassab; Cid Snyder	December 10, 2022
The Purple Pieman comes up with a sham holiday special, and Strawberry and friends make sure that he follows through on his promise.
27b	7b	"The Magic is You"	Shannon McClung; Michael Vogel	Paul Kassab; Cid Snyder	December 17, 2022
Strawberry Shortcake and friends are stressing about the holidays, but Blueberry Muffin reminds them of what is really important.
28a	8a	"Best New Year's Ever!"	Gabrielle McKetney; Rabiya Mansoor	Marilu Molina; Bob Baxter	December 24, 2022
Strawberry Shortcake and friends plan to bring in the New Year together, but then she gets an unexpected invitation from Kiki KeyLime.
28b	8b	"Pets to the Rescue!"	Gabrielle McKetney; Rabiya Mansoor	Marilu Molina; Bob Baxter	July 16, 2022
The Purple Pieman plots to steal Strawberry Shortcake's prize recipe but the pets won't let that happen.
29a	9a	"The Fashion Show"	Steph Garcia; Shannon McClung	Ashley Simpson; Morgan Shandro	September 10, 2022
The Purple Pieman wants to be the star of this year's Mint Gala even if he has to resort to sabotage.
29b	9b	"Figgy Pudding"	Steph Garcia; Shannon McClung	Ashley Simpson; Morgan Shandro	September 17, 2022
The owner of the Berryworks is coming to town and Bread Pudding needs everything to be perfect.
30a	10a	"Super-Berry"	Urszula Jurecka	Ashley Simpson	August 6, 2022
Orange Blossom worships the superheroes in her comics. Strawberry Shortcake shows her that Orange is her very own hero.
30b	10b	"All in the Palm"	Urszula Jurecka	Ashley Simpson	November 5, 2022
The biggest influencer orders a cake from Strawberry Shortcake. Desperate to impress, Strawberry turns to fate to help her figure out what to bake.
31a	11a	"Adventures in Berrysitting"	Steph Garcia; Michael Vogel	Paul Kassab; Katie Cordina	July 23, 2022
Strawberry Shortcake and Lime Chiffon volunteer to babysit, but they find this call a challenge.
31b	11b	"Strawberry's Bad Day!"	Steph Garcia; Michael Vogel	Paul Kassab; Katie Cordina	August 20, 2022
Strawberry Shortcake has a bad day, but Aunt Praline is there to help turn her day around.
32a	12a	"Granola Crunch"	Shannon McClung; Tony Campanella	Stephanie Cruz	November 26, 2022
The Purple Pieman wants to destroy the city's community garden to expand his empire. Strawberry and friends help to deal with him.
32b	12b	"Strawberry Nightmare"	Shannon McClung; Tony Campanella	Stephanie Cruz	October 29, 2022
Strawberry Shortcake has always dreamed of being the best baker in Apple City, but her dream soon becomes her nightmare.
33a	13a	"LemonLime Back in Time"	Steph Garcia; Shannon McClung	Desirae Salmark; Morgan Shandro	November 12, 2022
Before Lime Chiffon and Lemon Meringue became a dream team they had separate carts with partners that were definitely not the dream team.
33b	13b	"The Case of the Missing Spoon"	Steph Garcia; Shannon McClung	Desirae Salmark; Morgan Shandro	October 1, 2022
Strawberry Shortcake's Lucky Spoon keeps mysteriously disappearing and reappearing in her friends' carts.
34a	14a	"Strawberry Bake Fail"	Tony Campanella; Steph Garcia	Desirae Salmark; Katie Cordina	October 22, 2022
Strawberry Shortcake cannot seem to make macarons to save her life.
34b	14b	"Berry Competitive"	Tony Campanella; Steph Garcia	Desirae Salmark; Katie Cordina	December 31, 2022
Lemon and Orange Blossom enter an inventing competition together. Orange's competitive side puts their friendship to the test.
35a	15a	"Music in Our Hearts"	Urszula Jurecka; Steph Garcia	Ashley Simpson; Cid Snyder	January 7, 2023
Huckleberry Pie's guitar string breaks the day he has planned to audition for a music festival. His friends come to the rescue to make him shine.
35b	15b	"Parking Problems"	Urszula Jurecka; Steph Garcia	Ashley Simpson; Cid Snyder	January 14, 2023
Strawberry Shortcake tries to find the perfect spot to park her truck at the music festival but things keep getting in the way.
36a	16a	"Find Your Voice"	Michael Vogel; Steph Garcia	Bob Baxter; Paul Kassab	January 21, 2023
When her favorite band's lead singer quits during a music festival, Strawberry Shortcake gives them the confidence they need to perform anyway.
36b	16b	"Fashion Forward"	Michael Vogel; Steph Garcia	Bob Baxter; Paul Kassab	January 28, 2023
Bread Pudding and Lime Chiffon run into the most fashionable berry they have ever seen. Bread needs to impress her but goes about it the wrong way.
37a	17a	"Slumber Party"	Julia Yorks; Tony Campanella	Lazarino Baarde; Desirae Salmark	February 4, 2023
Strawberry and friends have a slumber party in the clubhouse but cannot agree on any slumber party activities.
37b	17b	"Catch that Cricket!"	Julia Yorks; Tony Campanella	Lazarino Baarde; Desirae Salmark	September 3, 2022
It has been a long day and Strawberry Shortcake and Aunt Praline want nothing more than to sleep, but they soon have a problem with cricket.
38a	18a	"The Legend of the Crystal Cupcake"	Shannon McClung; Steph Garcia	Haley Fox; Bob Baxter	February 11, 2023
Strawberry Shortcake and friends get trapped in an ancient booby trap right when she is having a baking meltdown. She is unaware that her pro baking skills are the only thing that can save them.
38b	18b	"Sweet and Sour"	Shannon McClung; Steph Garcia	Haley Fox; Bob Baxter	February 18, 2023
Sour Grapes feels alone in the world, so Strawberry Shortcake makes it her mission to prove that she is not.
39	19	"Peculiar Purple Partner"	Michael Vogel	Morgan Shandro	February 25, 2023; March 4, 2023
Part 1: Strawberry Shortcake goes into business with the Purple Pieman hoping that she will rub off on him, but some berries just don't want to change. Part 2: After losing her truck to the Peculiar Purple Pieman, Strawberry Shortcake wants to leave Big Apple City, but her friends won't let that happen.
40a	20a	"Let's Go to the Movies"	Michael Vogel	Marilu Molina; Paul Kassab	March 11, 2023
Orange Blossom and friends go to see a new movie starring her favourite superhero, but she wants to enjoy it in peace.
40b	20b	"Let the Good Times Roll"	Michael Vogel	Marilu Molina; Paul Kassab	March 18, 2023
Strawberry Shortcake's friends want to go to a roller-skating park, but roller-skating and Strawberry don't exactly get along.

=== Season 3 (2023–24) ===
No. overall	No. in season	Title	Written by	Storyboard by	Original release date
41	1	"Crabapple Jam"	Michael Vogel	Gabo Gedovius; Antonio de Pieri	July 15, 2023
Strawberry Shortcake meets the new owner of the Berryworks who brings some alarming changes for Strawberry and her friends.
42a	2a	"Strawberry and the Gigantic Cake"	Deborah Copeland	Ashley Simpson	July 22, 2023
Strawberry Shortcake and Raspberry Tart race across Big Apple City to deliver a 15-layer cake in time for Banoffee's birthday party.
42b	2b	"A Splash of Fun"	Michael Vogel	Cid Snyder	July 29, 2023
Strawberry and her friends try to cool off on a hot day, only to find themselves rejected from the one pool in all of Big Apple City.
43a	3a	"Slumber Party at Lemon's"	Shannon McClung	Alex Greychuck	August 5, 2023
Lemon wants her slumber party to go perfectly, but things don't go as planned.
43b	3b	"Hot, Fresh & Trending"	Julia Yorks	Kirk Jorgensen	August 12, 2023
Faced with hip new competition, Bread Pudding tries to update the Berryworks to keep up with the latest trends.
44a	4a	"Any Way You Slice It"	Meg Favreau	Cid Synder	August 19, 2023
Lime is torn when both of her dads invite her to different events on the same night.
44b	4b	"Custard's Big Adventure"	Bita Joudaki	Katie Cordina Lindsey	August 26, 2023
When Strawberry gets an impossible baking order from Crabapple Jam, Custard steps in to help make the impossible possible.
45a	5a	"Glamping vs Camping"	Shannon McClung	Bob Baxter	September 2, 2023
It is campers versus glampers as Strawberry's berry friends compete to see which is the better way to camp.
45b	5b	"Turn Things Around"	Michael Vogel	Ashley Simpson	September 9, 2023
When Huck and Bread make a thoughtful but unappetizing Stone Soup, Strawberry and the gang come to the rescue to save their meal. (Musical)
46a	6a	"Lord of the Smores"	Han-Yee Ling	Juan Sergio Alvarado Perez	September 16, 2023
With one marshmallow left in the campsite, berry turns against berry in a war to make the perfect last smore.
46b	6b	"Strawberry's Friendship Party"	Ula Sabina	Mollie McElvain	September 23, 2023
All of the Berry Besties are too busy with work to hang out, so Strawberry throws a Friendship Party hoping to bring all her friends back together.
47a	7a	"No Pizza for Strawberry"	Shannon McClung	Bob Baxter	September 30, 2023
Strawberry Shortcake bumps heads with a hot-tempered pizza vendor, Spicy Crust, when she asks for a not-so-spicy pizza. When Strawberry argues that pizza should be for everyone, she discovers that there is more to Spicy Crust.
47b	7b	"The Spec-taco-lar Pets"	Ty Freedman	Marilu Molina	October 7, 2023
Thinking that pets only make messes, Crabapple Jam bans all pets from the Berryworks.
48a	8a	"The House on Scary Berry Lane"	Tony Campanella	Bob Baxter	October 14, 2023
Strawberry, Blueberry and Raspberry make a delivery to a manor that is rumoured to be haunted.
48b	8b	"Trick and Treat!"	Michael Vogel	Juan Sergio; Alvarado Perez	October 21, 2023
It is Frightfall and Strawberry and her friends are in for more tricks than treats, thanks to the mischievous Cherry and Cheese.
49a	9a	"The Great Roller Rink Rivalry"	Shannon McClung	Ashley Simpson	October 28, 2023
A roller-skating rivalry between Strawberry and Orange heats up on the roller rink when Orange's competitiveness puts their friendship at stake.
49b	9b	"The Battle of Blueberry's Slumber Party"	Shannon McClung	Topher Parnell	November 4, 2023
When Blueberry's mom accidentally books Blueberry's slumber party and her brother's on the same night, Blueberry's trust in the universe is tested.
50a	10a	"Strawberry's Shortcake"	Tony Campanella	Antonio de Pieri	November 11, 2023
Crabapple Jam asks Strawberry to make a strawberry shortcake, a task so overwhelming that Strawberry runs away.
50b	10b	"Berry Bounty Bust"	Michael Vogel	Bob Baxter	November 18, 2023
Strawberry and Lime get caught in Aunt Praline and Fluffy Chiffon's dispute over different Berry Bounty Banquet traditions.
51a	11a	"Go with the Flow"	Michael Vogel	Katie Cordina Lindsey	November 25, 2023
Despite their hard work, Strawberry, and Orange struggle to perfectly land their roller-skating routine.
51b	11b	"Strawberry's Perfect Present"	Ana Sani	Ashley Simpson	December 2, 2023
It is Winter Swirl and Strawberry is excited for the Secret-Swirl Gift Exchange until she draws the names of two berries that are impossible to please.
52a	12a	"A Holiday Your Way!"	Michael Vogel	Topher Parnell	December 9, 2023
When Honeydew's snowberry is made fun of by other berries, Strawberry steps in to show them there are a lot of ways to make a snowman.
52b	12b	"Kiki KeyLime's Favourite Things"	Taylor Hill	Juan Sergio Alvarado Perez	December 16, 2023
Tricked by Crabapple Jam, Strawberry loses a spot in a special Kiki KeyLime event.
53a	13a	"Orange's Slumber Party"	Maryan Haye	Carlin Filewich	December 23, 2023
A scary movie spooks the berry besties at Orange's slumber party.
53b	13b	"The Swirliverse Strikes Back"	Tony Campanella	Cid Snyder	December 30, 2023
Strawberry needs help making strawberry shortcake, so she dives into her swirliverse, only to discover that everything is covered in mold.
54a	14a	"Sky High Pie"	Shannon McClung	Antonio de Pieri	January 6, 2024
Cherry and Cheese turn friends back to foes when they start a rumor to stir up trouble between Strawberry and Raspberry.
54b	14b	"Crushing the Cosplay"	Gail Simone	Marilu Molina	January 13, 2024
When a comic book convention arrives in Big Apple City, Orange wants Strawberry to be the Guava Girl to her Tangerine Smash in a Cosplay Competition.
55a	15a	"The Big Apple City All-Skate Competition"	Shannon McClung	Carlin Filewich	January 20, 2024
In Big Apple City All Skate competition, Strawberry, Blueberry and Orange are ready to show off their hard work and win the competition, but a surprise throws their routine off.
55b	15b	"Following the Recipe"	Taylor Hill	Katie Cordina Lindsey	January 27, 2024
Usually one to go with her gut, Blueberry struggles when Genoise Lacreme asks her to make spumoni ice cream cake exactly to her Bisnonna's recipe.
56a	16a	"Aunt Praline's Sweetie Pie"	Han-Yee Ling	Cid Snyder	February 3, 2024
When Aunt Praline is nervous for her Sweetie Pie Date, Strawberry and her berry friends help her gain back her confidence with a practice date.
56b	16b	"Jam Session"	Michael Vogel	Antonio de Pieri	February 10, 2024
An unexpected delay causes Strawberry and her friends to get stuck on the Funnel Cake Train.
57a	17a	"Night of the Sweet Tooth Fairy"	Tony Campanella	Topher Parnell	February 17, 2024
When Lime loses a tooth at her slumber party, the berry friends are surprised to discover Blueberry's fear of the Sweet Tooth Fairy. To prove to her that there is nothing to be afraid of, Lime, Strawberry, Orange and Lemon promise to stay up.
57b	17b	"The Berry Best Baker Competition"	Tony Campanella	Marilu Molina	February 24, 2024
Crabapple Jam surprises Strawberry Shortcake and Raspberry Tart with a series of baking challenges to find out which of the berries is the better baker, but Strawberry is not sure what to do.
58a	18a	"Donuts and Drawbridges"	Shannon McClung	Carlin Filewich	March 2, 2024
In a game of Donuts and Drawbridges, Huck, Bread, and Plum set off to return golden sprinkles to Strawberry, the baker of House Shortcake.
58b	18b	"The Berryville Trail"	Shannon McClung	Cid Synder	March 9, 2024
It is game night at Strawberry's, and Raspberry Tart is less than thrilled when Strawberry unveils her complicated game "The Berryville Trail".
59a	19a	"Confectionary Decree Number 33"	Tony Campanella	Katie Cordina Lindsey	March 16, 2024
Crabapple has left Cherry and Cheese in charge to ensure the berries follow her new rules exactly. When chaos ensues, Raspberry puts her foot down.
59b	19b	"Relaxing by the Pool"	Han-Yee Ling	Bob Baxter	March 23, 2024
It is a not so relaxing day by the pool when the berries have different ideas on what it means to relax—Lime and Blueberry want to chill by the pool, while Strawberry and Orange want to dive right in.
60	20	"Bake the World a Better Place"	Michael Vogel	Antonio de Pieri	March 30, 2024 (Part 1) April 6, 2024 (Part 2)
60	20	"Bake the World a Better Place"	Michael Vogel	Topher Parnell	March 30, 2024 (Part 1) April 6, 2024 (Part 2)
Part 1: Crabapple Jam makes an announcement that threatens life at the Berryworks forever; Crabapple promises Strawberry a bright future as a baker, but at the cost of leaving her berry friends behind. Part 2: Strawberry and her friends find themselves fired from the Berryworks as Crabapple Jam transforms it into her own Crabappleworks, but, despite their not-so-fantastic circumstances, all is not lost.

== Films ==
=== Special telefilms ===
No.	Title	Directed by	Written by	Storyboard by	Original release date
1	"Strawberry Shortcake and the Beast of Berry Bog"	Jim Miller	Jocelyn Geddie	Stephanie Cruz; Haley Fox; Sara Kim; Topher Parnell	September 22, 2023
When a big, scary monster tries to spoil the spooky season, Strawberry Shortcake and her Berry Besties must face their fears to solve the mystery.
2	"Strawberry Shortcake's Perfect Holiday"	Jim Miller	Michael Vogel	Eunice Chu; Carlin Filewich; Gabo Gedovius; Marilu Molina	November 1, 2023
With holiday chores piling up and a cookie-stealing villain on the loose, Strawberry and her Berry Buddies must work together to save Winter Swirl.
3	"Strawberry Shortcake's Spring Spectacular"	Jim Miller	Michael Vogel	Chelsea Woolman (supervisor); MJ Barros; Haley Fox; Sara Kim; Topher Parnell	March 8, 2024
Strawberry thinks more popularity will help her baking dreams come true and decides to compete to win best float at the flower festival. Pumpkin Spice, not wanting to be outdone, teams up with the Purple Pieman to stop Strawberry from winning.: This telefilm was released worldwide in cinemas at VOXTheater Cinemas (Arabia) on January 25, 2024.
4	"Strawberry Shortcake's Summer Vacation"	Jim Miller; Megan Russell	Han-Yee Ling	Chelsea Woolman (supervisor); Eunice Chu; Carlin Filewich; Paul Kassab; Marilu Molina; Jae Woon Jang	May 10, 2024
In the next summer holiday, Strawberry brings her friends to her hometown to meet her family, and while it is awkward at first, everyone bands together when they discover the river has dried up and the family farm is at risk of being sold.: This telefilm was released worldwide in cinemas at VOXTheater Cinemas (Arabia) on January 25, 2024.

== Distribution ==
=== Broadcast ===
After debuting on YouTube, the series aired on the Canadian children's channel Family Jr., starting on October 17, 2021. The series was released on Netflix, on April 15, 2022 in all countries. It also aired on Kids Street in the United States from May 28, 2022 to May 22, 2024. In the United Kingdom, the series premiered on Tiny Pop on March 7, 2022.

=== Home media and streaming services ===
With several other WildBrain properties, Berry in the Big City was added to Netflix on September 21, 2022, in the United States.

NCircle Entertainment has the DVD rights for the series in Region 1. The series' three seasons have been released in DVD box sets.

== Reception ==
=== Awards and nominations ===
Year	Award event	Category	Works	Result
2022	GLAAD Media Awards	Outstanding Children's Programming	Berry Bounty Banquet Part 2	Nominated
2022	Licensing International Excellence Awards	Best Licensing Agency		Nominated
2022	Leo Awards	Best Musical Score Animation Series	Daniel Ingram & Trevor Hoffmann (Fright Fall)	Nominated
2022	Leo Awards	Best Screenwriting in an Animation Series	Michael Vogel (Berry Bounty Banquet Part 1)	Nominated
2023	GLAAD Media Awards	Outstanding Children's Programming	The Fashion Show	Nominated
2024	ACTRA Awards	Outstanding Performance – Gender Non-Conforming or Female Voice	Margarita Valderrama (Strawberry Shortcake and the Beast of Berry Bog)	Nominated
2024	GLAAD Media Awards	Outstanding Children's Programming	Any Way You Slice It	Nominated
2024	Canadian Screen Awards	Best Performance in Television Animation	Ana Sani (Strawberry Shortcake and the Beast of Berry Bog)	Nominated
2024	Canadian Cinema Editors Awards	Best Editing in Animation	Orion McCaw, Rob Smith & Matthew Innanen (Strawberry Shortcake's Perfect Holiday)	Nominated
2024	Leo Awards	Best Animation Program	Strawberry Shortcake's Perfect Holiday	Nominated
2024	Leo Awards	Best Direction in an Animation Program	Megan Russell & Jim Miller (Strawberry Shortcake's Perfect Holiday)	Nominated
2024	Leo Awards	Best Musical Score in an Animation Program	Daniel Ingram & Trevor Hoffmann (Strawberry Shortcake's Perfect Holiday)	Won
2024	Leo Awards	Best Voice Performance in an Animation Program	Kelli Ogmundson (Strawberry Shortcake and the Beast of Berry Bog)	Nominated
2024	ACTRA Awards	Best Voice Performance	Kelli Ogmundson (Strawberry Shortcake's Spring Spectacular)	Nominated
2024	ACTRA Awards	Best Voice Performance	Rhona Rees (Strawberry Shortcake's Summer Vacation)	Nominated
2025	GLAAD Media Awards	Outstanding Children's Programming	Aunt Praline's Sweetie Pie	Nominated
2025	Youth Media Alliance Awards of Excellence	Best Narrative Film or One-Off Special	Strawberry Shortcake and the Beast of Berry Bog	Nominated
2025	Leo Awards	Best Musical Score in an Animation Program	Daniel Ingram & Trevor Hoffmann (Strawberry Shortcake's Summer Vacation)	Nominated
2025	Leo Awards	Best Voice Performance in an Animation Program	Kelli Ogmundson (Strawberry Shortcake's Spring Spectacular)	Won
