= Ana Sani =

Canadian actress

- Born: Anahita Sani; Richmond Hill, Ontario, Canada
- Education: University of Toronto (BA)
- Occupation: Actress
- Years active: 2011–present

Anahita "Ana" Sani is a Canadian actress. She's most known for her voice roles on Mysticons, Ollie's Pack, Strawberry Shortcake: Berry in the Big City and My Little Pony: Make Your Mark.

== Career ==
Sani has had recurring roles as Anika in The Boys and voice roles in Mysticons, Ollie's Pack, Strawberry Shortcake: Berry in the Big City, My Little Pony: Make Your Mark, My Little Pony: Tell Your Tale and Work It Out Wombats!.

In 2026, Sani competed on season 51 of the American version of Survivor. She was voted out second overall, finishing in 20th place.

== Filmography ==
=== Television ===
Year	Title	Role	Notes
2017–2018	Mysticons	Piper Willowbrook / Mysticon Striker	Main role (voice)
2018–2019	Bakugan: Battle Planet	Veronica Venegas / Dee / Emily	Recurring roles (voice)
2019–2024	The Boys	Anika	5 episodes
2020–2021	Ollie's Pack	Cleo Badette	Main role (voice)
2021	My Little Pony: Pony Life	Sugar Snap	Recurring role (voice)
2021–2024	Strawberry Shortcake: Berry in the Big City	Strawberry Shortcake / Various roles	Main role (voice)
2022	Angry Birds: Summer Madness	Robin / Matilda	Main roles (voice)
2022–2023	My Little Pony: Make Your Mark	Izzy Moonbow	Main role (voice)
2022–2025	My Little Pony: Tell Your Tale	Izzy Moonbow	Main role (voice)
2023–present	Work It Out Wombats!	Leiko	Recurring role (voice)
2026	Survivor 51	Contestant	Finished 20th place

=== Film ===
Year	Title	Role	Notes
2023	Strawberry Shortcake and the Beast of Berry Bog	Strawberry Shortcake	TV movie (voice)
2023	Strawberry Shortcake's Perfect Holiday	Strawberry Shortcake	TV movie (voice)
2024	Strawberry Shortcake's Spring Spectacular	Strawberry Shortcake	TV movie (voice)
2024	Strawberry Shortcake's Summer Vacation	Strawberry Shortcake	TV movie (voice)

== Awards and nominations ==
Year	Award	Category	Nominated work	Result	Ref.
2019	ACTRA Award	Outstanding Performance – Female Voice	Mysticons	Nominated	
2024	Canadian Screen Awards	Best Performance in Television Animation	Strawberry Shortcake and the Beast of Berry Bog	Nominated	

== See also ==
- Survivor 51
