= List of Hotel Transylvania: The Series episodes =

Hotel Transylvania: The Series is a Canadian-American animated comedy television series produced by Sony Pictures Animation and Nelvana in association with Corus Entertainment. It is based on and serves as a prequel to the film Hotel Transylvania (2012), taking place in 2008, four years before the events of the first film, focusing on the activities of 114/115-year-old Mavis and her best friends at the Hotel Transylvania while Dracula is away at the Vampire Council.

The 26-episode first season premiered on June 25, 2017, on Disney Channel in the United States, with the first episode released earlier on June 20, 2017, on the WATCH Disney Channel app, YouTube, and VOD. The last eight episodes of the first season were first streamed onto Netflix in the United States on June 25, 2018, prior to their television air dates. In Canada, the series premiered October 2, 2017, on Teletoon.

On September 12, 2018, a second season was announced. The second season premiered on October 8, 2019, and ended being cancelled on October 29, 2020.

The series has currently not been released on DVD or any home media format.

== Series overview ==
Season	Segments	Episodes	Originally released	
Season	Segments	Episodes	First released	Last released
Shorts	N/A	4	June 9, 2017	June 24, 2017
1	48	26	June 25, 2017	October 25, 2018
2	49	26	October 8, 2019	October 29, 2020

== Episodes ==
=== Shorts (2017) ===
These shorts were released through WATCH Disney Channel and Disney Channel's YouTube, they also sometimes aired on Disney Channel during commercial breaks.

No.	Title	Written and storyboarded by	Original release date
1	"Summer Vacation"	Unknown	June 9, 2017
A compilation of clips from the first season.
2	"Drac Be Trippin'"	Michael D'Ascenzo	June 11, 2017
Drac is a terrible packer, so Mavis wants to help make sure he has everything he'll need while away at the Vampire Council.
3	"Who's the Boss"	Michael D'Ascenzo	June 18, 2017
With her dad leaving for the Vampire Council, Mavis wants to prove that she can be the hotel's temporary manager, so she shows off all the great things she's done around the hotel.
4	"Ballad of Mavis"	Unknown	June 24, 2017
Mavis is the frightener of humans and caused the most blood-curdling scream on Bad Friday!

=== Season 1 (2017–18) ===
No.	Title	Written by	Storyboard by	Original release date	US viewers (millions)
1a	"Enter the Nosepicker"	Mark Steinberg	Frank Litzen	June 25, 2017 (Note: This episode was released early on June 20, 2017 on the WATCH Disney Channel app, YouTube, and VOD.)	0.96
When an unexpected visit from an infant human brings chaos to the hotel, Mavis and her friends must make sure that her Aunt Lydia never finds out, not to mention let it intervene with the hotel's inspection.
1b	"Hide & Shriek"	Ben Joseph	Eugene McDermott	June 25, 2017	0.96
After finding her long-lost spirit doll, Mavis decides to have some fun with her. But the hidden truth is, the "playful" doll wants to be with Mavis and her friends – forever. Now, Mavis must figure out how to get rid of the annoying undetachable nuisance before it's too late.
2a	"Bad Friday"	Alex Ganetakos	Brandon Kruse	June 26, 2017	1.09
The friends compete for an award when the holiday known as Bad Friday arrives.
2b	"Hoop Screams"	Emer Connon	Dave Thomas	June 26, 2017	1.09
Mavis gives Hank the gift of basketball.
3a	"Buggin' Out"	Alice Prodanou	Dave Schott	June 27, 2017	1.18
Mavis puts the wrong bugs in the guest's rooms causing them to tell the truth and has to figure out a solution.
3b	"How Do You Solve a Problem Like Medusa"	Andrew Harrison	Brandon Kruse	June 27, 2017	1.18
Lydia's enemy from high school arrives at the hotel...after being invited by Mavis!
4a	"Adventures in Vampiresitting"	Mark Steinberg	TBA	June 28, 2017	1.12
Mavis disguises herself as a human to spy on a family, but ends up babysitting a child. Her and her friends engage in shenanigans around the house, but soon the real babysitter shows up and informs the mother of the monsters. The house is then put on lockdown, and the monsters have to find a way to escape. In the end, Mavis decides humans shouldn't be feared.
4b	"Phlegm Ball"	Ben Joseph	TBA	June 28, 2017	1.12
Mavis and her friends are visited by Claus, her cousin who wishes to prove he's better at playing phlegm ball than her. When she learns her friends have been letting her win, Mavis accepts Claus' challenge, but her dad's lucky fangs are on the line.
5a	"Wendy Big and Tall"	Emer Connon	TBA	June 29, 2017	1.44
Wendy wants to get taller, but is accidentally turned into a giant monster.
5b	"Doppelfanger"	Andrew Harrison	TBA	June 29, 2017	1.44
Mavis' favorite singer comes to visit the hotel.
6a	"Great Eggspectations"	Alice Prodanou	TBA	July 9, 2017	1.21
Mavis proves that she's responsible by taking care of one of Quasimodo's eggs.
6b	"Hotel Pennsylvania"	Andrew Harrison	TBA	July 9, 2017	1.21
Mavis and her friends try to find a way to watch the finale of their favorite human TV show after Aunt Lydia disconnects all the cables in the hotel.
7a	"Breakfast at Lydia's"	Ben Joseph	TBA	July 16, 2017	0.83
After Mavis becomes employee of the month, she joins her Aunt Lydia in the monthly employee of the month breakfast.
7b	"The Trouble with Wendies"	Alex Ganetakos	TBA	July 16, 2017	0.83
Wendy becomes indebted to Dr. Gillman after he saves her ponytail.
8a	"Frankenstunt"	Andrew Harrison	TBA	July 23, 2017	1.05
Hank has to pretend to be his dad while he shoots his new action flick.
8b	"What About Blob?"	Mark Steinberg	TBA	July 23, 2017	1.05
Mavis and Wendy set up Aunt Lydia and Bob Blob on a date.
9a	"Curse Club"	Alice Prodanou	TBA	July 30, 2017	1.12
Pedro tries to learn how to put a curse on people
9b	"Casket If You Can"	Emer Connon	TBA	July 30, 2017	1.12
After Diane gets sick, Mavis is in charge of watching her Aunt Lydia's rejuvenating casket while she sleeps.
10a	"A Scare to Remember"	Ben Joseph	TBA	August 6, 2017	1.05
Aunt Lydia's favorite author, Cornelius Shivers, re-visits the Bed and Breakfast, not realising when the kids cleaned up after a party they accidentally got rid of the ghost author who really writes his books.
10b	"Hank and the Real Boy"	Alice Prodanou	TBA	August 6, 2017	1.05
Mavis tries to help Hank attach his body parts better, but accidentally turns him into a real boy.
11a	"The Wrapture"	Alex Ganetakos	TBA	August 20, 2017	0.80
When Mavis accidentally gets rid of Pedro's wraps, she tries to replace them but doesn't use the right material, and he starts to assume a new identity.
11b	"Becoming Klaus"	Emer Connon	TBA	August 20, 2017	0.80
Mavis breaks a fang, causing her to get a transplant...from Klaus.
12a	"116 Candles"	Andrew Harrison	TBA	October 1, 2017	1.18
Mavis wants to go to a Jett Black concert, but Aunt Lydia won't let her. Mavis gives Lydia a perfume that reverts her age back to a teenager.
12b	"Stop or My Mummy Will Shout"	Ben Joseph	TBA	October 1, 2017	1.18
Pedro's mummy mommy comes to visit him at the hotel, so to impress her, they pretend Pedro is in charge.
13	"The Legend of Pumpkin Guts"	Mark Steinberg	TBA	October 8, 2017	0.84
Curious to know the secret behind Halloween, Mavis and her cousins break out of lockdown to find the truth before Aunt Lydia discovers them missing. At the Vampire Council, Dracula runs off to find and protect Mavis. He reveals to her that many centuries ago, a curious young monster had caused the mythical "Pumpkin Guts" to rise and terrorize the monster world and that he was the culprit. He and Mavis then fight as bats to stop it and learn that candy is its weakness.
14a	"Fright of Hand"	Alex Ganetakos	TBA	October 15, 2017	1.00
At Diane's party, Mavis takes over from a crummy magician she hired, and accidentally loses Diane in a strange void.
14b	"Dude Where's My Garlic?"	Emer Connon	TBA	October 15, 2017	1.00
Quasimodo has tons of garlic in the kitchen, which prompts Mavis' curiosity as to why it is deadly to vampires.
15a	"Bat Flap Fever"	Ben Joseph	TBA	October 22, 2017	0.77
Dracula gets an endorsement deal and he names the prototype after Mavis.
15b	"Thumb and Thumber"	Alice Prodanou	TBA	October 22, 2017	0.77
Hank is estatic when he is revealed to have Dracula blood in him, making him and Mavis distant cousins-once-removed.
16a	"Brain Drain"	Alice Prodanou	TBA	November 4, 2017	0.89
Hank and Zombie Einstein inadvertently have a brain exchange.
16b	"Hair Today, Gone Tomorrow"	Andrew Harrison	TBA	November 4, 2017	0.89
Medusa returns to stay at Hotel Transylvania again.
17a	"Drop the Needle"	Alex Ganetakos	TBA	November 11, 2017	0.83
Cousin Klaus comes to Mavis looking for help with a terrible secret.
17b	"Really Gross Anatomy"	Emer Connon	TBA	November 11, 2017	0.83
Dr. Gillman is discovered to be a fraud.
18	"The Fright Before Creepmas"	Andrew Harrison	TBA	December 2, 2017	0.72
Mavis meets Krampus and begs him to fix a 1,000-year-old mistake so Aunt Lydia will allow everyone else to enjoy a family Creepmas.
19a	"Exit Sandman"	Alice Prodanou	TBA	October 15, 2018 (Note: This episode premiered in Canada in June 2018 prior to their United States premiere.)	0.62
The Sandman casts a spell on the hotel.: This episode first premiered on Disney Channel in the UK and Ireland on March 17, 2018 before its US debut on Netflix on June 25, 2018.
19b	"Roadkill Trip"	Ben Joseph	TBA	October 15, 2018	0.62
Mavis and Uncle Gene go on a road trip for the very last time.: This episode first premiered on Disney Channel in the UK and Ireland on March 17, 2018.
20a	"Top Wing"	Andrew Harrison	TBA	October 16, 2018	0.38
Wendy wants to join the hotel's aerial security team.: This episode first premiered on Disney Channel in the UK and Ireland on March 24, 2018.
20b	"Fried Mean Tomatoes"	Emer Connon	TBA	October 16, 2018	0.38
Mavis tries to make Quasimodo nice.: This episode first premiered on Disney Channel in the UK and Ireland on March 24, 2018.
21a	"Four Monsters and a Funeral"	Alice Prodanou	TBA	October 17, 2018	0.36
Mavis throws a fake funeral to convince Death that Uncle Gene is already dead.: This episode first premiered on Disney Channel in the UK and Ireland on June 4, 2018.
21b	"Rainbow Doom"	Ben Joseph and Mike D'Ascenzo	TBA	June 24, 2018 (Canada) October 17, 2018 (United States)	0.36
Mavis uses a cursed code to beat the video game, Rainbow Doom, but now she's caused the game to exit the TV and literally begin to take over the monster world, starting with Hotel Transylvania.: This episode first premiered on Disney Channel in the UK and Ireland on June 5, 2018 before its US debut on Netflix 20 days later on June 25, 2018.
22	"Drac to the Future"	Alex Ganetakos	TBA	June 25, 2018 (Netflix US) October 18, 2018 (United States)	0.35
A self-updating book on the history of monsters gets displayed at the hotel. When Kitty gets sucked in, Mavis travels back in time to get her back.: This episode first premiered on Disney Channel in the UK and Ireland on March 10, 2018 before its Canada debut on Teletoon on June 30, 2018.
23a	"Gorytelling"	Ben Joseph	TBA	June 25, 2018 (Netflix US) October 22, 2018 (United States)	0.38
Mavis tries to keep things under control when Cornelius Shivers comes to visit; he is writing a book about the hotel, and Mavis wants to use her skills as leverage to be appointed full-time manager.: This episode first premiered on Disney Channel in the UK and Ireland on June 6, 2018 before its Canada debut on Teletoon on July 1, 2018.
23b	"A Few Good Monsters"	Andrew Harrison	TBA	June 25, 2018 (Netflix US) October 22, 2018 (United States)	0.38
The kids are the prime suspects after a priceless Dracula family heirloom is found destroyed. Aunt Lydia is forced to put them all on trial when no one owns up.: This episode first premiered on Disney Channel in the UK and Ireland on June 7, 2018 before its Canada debut on Teletoon on July 1, 2018.
24a	"Mummyfest Destiny"	Alex Ganetakos	TBA	June 25, 2018 (Netflix US); October 23, 2018 (United States)	0.29
Pedro's secret buffet weapon is finally revealed to everyone in Hotel Transylvania.: This episode first premiered on Disney Channel in the UK and Ireland on June 11, 2018 before its Canada debut on Teletoon on July 7, 2018.
24b	"Bandages of Brothers"	Andrew Harrison	TBA	June 25, 2018 (Netflix US) October 23, 2018 (United States)	0.29
Roommates Pedro and Hank decide it is time to go their separate ways and no longer share a room.: This episode first premiered on Disney Channel in the UK and Ireland on June 12, 2018 before its Canada debut on Teletoon on July 7, 2018.
25a	"Creepover Party"	Mark Steinberg	TBA	June 25, 2018 (Netflix US) October 24, 2018 (United States)	0.32
Mavis' werewolf pals from her old Ghoul Guide troop are coming to the hotel for a visit and Mavis is super excited because it's their chance to finally earn the last badge on their Ghoul Guides sash.: This episode first premiered on Disney Channel in the UK and Ireland on June 13, 2018 before its Canada debut on Teletoon on July 7, 2018.
25b	"Frankenstein & Son"	Alice Prodanou	TBA	June 25, 2018 (Netflix US) October 24, 2018 (United States)	0.32
Frankenstein wants to try his hand at serious, dramatic acting, so he can win a shiny award.: This episode first premiered on Disney Channel in the UK and Ireland on June 14, 2018 before its Canada debut on Teletoon on July 7, 2018.
26	"Fangceañera"	Mark Steinberg	TBA	June 25, 2018 (Netflix US) October 25, 2018 (United States)	0.29
On Mavis' 115th birthday, she wants to travel to the mysterious and dangerous Fangceañera realm to earn her Dracula cape by a task spun on the Wheel of Destiny, but her overprotective father ruins her plans.: This episode first premiered on Disney Channel in the UK and Ireland on June 15, 2018 before its Canada debut on Teletoon on July 14, 2018, aka the day after the release of Hotel Transylvania 3: Summer Vacation.

=== Season 2 (2019–20) ===
No. overall	No. in season	Title	Written by	Storyboard by	Original release date	US viewers (millions)
27a	1a	"Welcome to Human Park"	Ben Joseph	TBA	October 8, 2019	0.27
Mavis and the gang want to be scared on the night before Halloween.
27b	1b	"Must Scream TV"	Josh Gal	TBA	October 8, 2019	0.27
Pedro "fixing" the TV gets Mavis trapped inside.
28	2	"Married to the Blob"	Mark Steinberg	TBA	October 9, 2019	0.21
When Wendy's father and Pedro's mother plan to get married, Mavis promises that she will throw them the best wedding ever.
29a	3a	"Portrait of Mavis as a Young Vampire"	Ben Joseph	TBA	October 10, 2019	0.19
Mavis falls asleep while sitting for a portrait by Zombie Michelangelo, leading to an embarrassing portrait. But she and her friends' efforts to fix the portrait lead to magical problems.
29b	3b	"Goo Crush"	Josh Gal	TBA	October 10, 2019	0.19
Mavis encourages Wendy to find a crush. But Wendy makes a big mistake looking for a crush while she's missing her glasses.
30a	4a	"Freakerheads"	Ben Joseph	TBA	October 11, 2019	0.29
Hank entrusts Mavis with acquiring for him the rare and powerful Freakerhead of phlegm ball player Nuge LaRouche.
30b	4b	"For Whom the Smell Tolls"	Alex Ganetakos	TBA	October 11, 2019	0.29
As a part of vampire puberty, Mavis gets the Vapors, giving her a smell that repulses all other monsters.
31a	5a	"Cries and Dolls"	Josh Gal	TBA	October 15, 2019	0.18
Mavis swears that Demented Debbie the doll has returned to torment her.
31b	5b	"Hypnosferatu"	Alex Ganetakos	TBA	October 15, 2019	0.18
Mavis tries her new hypnosis power on Donald, turning him into a suave vampire lover that sweeps Lydia off her feet.
32a	6a	"Best Friends Furever"	Alice Prodanou	TBA	October 16, 2019	0.27
Mavis uses Lydia's staff to teleport between time with Wendy and time with werewolves Sophie and Charlotte.
32b	6b	"Fantasy Vamp"	Ben Joseph	TBA	October 16, 2019	0.27
Mavis wins a trip to visit Nuge LaRouche's phlegm ball fantasy camp. When Nuge treats her friends rudely, she helps them land a slam dunk on him, destroying his confidence.
33a	7a	"Stepmonsters"	Mark Steinberg	TBA	October 17, 2019	0.24
Mavis tries to distract Wendy and Pedro by encouraging them to spend quality time with their new stepparents.
33b	7b	"Better Know Your Mavis"	Mark Steinberg	TBA	October 17, 2019	0.24
When Mavis takes ill, Wendy winds up in a competition with Sophie and Charlotte over who can better take care of her.
34a	8a	"The Northern Frights"	Ben Joseph	TBA	October 18, 2019	0.28
Fed up with Uncle Gene's interminable gaming, Mavis tricks him into attending a performance by the Northern Frights.
34b	8b	"Don't Fear the Realtor"	Josh Gal	TBA	October 18, 2019	0.28
Maggie the Ghostwriter is now a realtor trying to sell the hotel.
35a	9a	"Holy Babies"	Shawn Kalb	TBA	October 21, 2019	0.26
Mavis and Pedro lie about their birthdays to get free ice cream. When their lie fools Death, he decides to turn them both to babies to straighten out his records.
35b	9b	"Aunt Lydia's New Clothes"	Emer Connon	TBA	October 21, 2019	0.26
Lydia buys a poncho that can make its wearer invisible, but Mavis ruins it while fooling around with it on.
36a	10a	"I Only Have Eyes for Goo"	Ben Joseph	TBA	October 22, 2019	0.21
Dr. Gillman prescribes Wendy "cursed" glasses that enable her to read minds. Mavis uses Wendy's ability to help her get a promotion.
36b	10b	"Talk Blobbish to Me"	Josh Gal	TBA	October 22, 2019	0.21
In an effort to help Pedro learn Blobbish, Mavis casts a spell that accidentally makes almost everyone else speak only Blobbish.
37a	11a	"Wand Ambition"	Shawn Kalb	TBA	October 23, 2019	0.20
Mavis accidentally throws out Tiffany's magic wand while emptying the lost and found. Kitty gets her hand on the wand and uses it to cast a spell over the entire hotel.
37b	11b	"Lost in Transylvation"	Emer Connon	TBA	October 23, 2019	0.20
Mavis unexpectedly invents a new word that gets into the Vampire dictionary.
38a	12a	"The Song Remains Asleep"	Ben Joseph	TBA	October 24, 2019	0.28
Donald can't help but sing in his sleep. His song becomes a big hit when used as elevator music at the hotel.
38b	12b	"Baby Got Hunchback"	Ben Joseph and Mike D'Ascenzo	TBA	October 24, 2019	0.28
The teens mass produce and market Quasimodo's dirt flambe recipe against his will, bringing him unwanted attention.
39a	13a	"Afterlifestyles of the Rich and Mavis"	Mark Steinberg	TBA	October 25, 2019	0.27
Mavis has the hotel make big plans for the Steins' AniverScary. But the plans could get ruined when Mavis loses track of Frank's body.
39b	13b	"The Mavysitters Club"	Alice Prodanou	TBA	October 25, 2019	0.27
Klaus reveals a talent at babysitting.
40	14	"A Year Without Creepmas"	Andrew Harrison	TBA	December 7, 2019	N/A
Mavis confronts Krampus because he is slacking on the job but inadvertently convinces him to take a vacation. She has to team up with a strange, bearded man to save Creepmas.
41a	15a	"Casualties of Wart"	Emer Connon	TBA	October 3, 2020	0.23
The witches mistake a pimple on Mavis's head for a wart and then assume that she is now a witch and invite her into their clique.
41b	15b	"When the Afterlife Gives You Phlegmonade"	Shawn Kalb	TBA	October 3, 2020	0.23
The Werewolf twins have a falling out while trying to run a Phlegmonade stand. Mavis thinks the solution is for Sophie and Charlotte to spend time apart.
42a	16a	"Undead Red"	Ben Joseph	TBA	October 4, 2020	0.34
The true identity of Undead Red, a scary monster that appears to humans when they recite his name three times, surprises Mavis.
42b	16b	"Klaus of the Rising Sun"	Josh Gal	TBA	October 4, 2020	0.34
Klaus becomes a hero when he inadvertently saves Mavis from a sunbeam.
43a	17a	"Say Princess to the Dress"	Emer Connon	TBA	October 10, 2020	0.29
Mavis sniffs a flower meant for Kitty. The pollen turns her into a dainty princess.
43b	17b	"The Naming of the Shrew"	Ben Joseph and Mike D'Ascenzo	TBA	October 10, 2020	0.29
The staff lose their fear of Aunt Lydia when Mavis reveals her real name in a game of Jinx.: The title is a parody on The Taming of the Shrew Shakespeare play
44a	18a	"Death Becomes Him"	Alice Prodanou	TBA	October 11, 2020	0.35
Pedro gets stuck with Death's job when he steals his robe. Death is only too happy to pawn the job off to him.
44b	18b	"Purse of the Mummy"	Mark Steinberg	TBA	October 11, 2020	0.35
Shonda buys a magic purse for Wendy's birthday, but Mavis loses control of it.
45a	19a	"Cape Boss"	Ben Joseph and Mike D'Ascenzo	TBA	October 17, 2020	0.38
Mavis could lose her precious cape if she can't show she has it well trained.
45b	19b	"Diner of the Dead"	Josh Gal	TBA	October 17, 2020	0.38
Pedro greatly boosts the zombie staff's energy when he feeds them the Cartwrights' porridge, causing a zombie apocalypse.
46a	20a	"Six Feet Undercover Boss"	Ben Joseph	TBA	October 18, 2020	0.25
The hotel's new janitor just might be Aunt Lydia in disguise spying on her employees.
46b	20b	"Ghost Effect"	Josh Gal	TBA	October 18, 2020	0.25
Mavis sets up an elaborate safety system to prevent workplace accidents at the hotel.
47a	21a	"World Wide Wendy"	Emer Connon	TBA	October 24, 2020	0.24
Mavis learns the best way to bring the Hotel into the future is to go wireless.
47b	21b	"Stuck in the Middle With Goo"	Alice Prodanou	TBA	October 24, 2020	0.24
The step-siblings Pedro and Wendy need a tiebreaker.
48a	22a	"The Shawhank Redemption"	Ben Joseph	TBA	October 25, 2020	0.30
Mavis and the gang help Hank overcome his fears with a little scare-apy.
48b	22b	"Friendship Is Tragic"	Alice Prodanou	TBA	October 25, 2020	0.30
Mavis is excited to have a day all to herself which upsets her best friends, thinking they are drifting apart.
49a	23a	"Cursery Rhymes"	Emer Connon	TBA	October 26, 2020	0.19
The gang tries to get Baby Blendy to start crying again when she starts cooing and giggling.
49b	23b	"I Did It All for the Cookie"	Shawn Kalb	TBA	October 26, 2020	0.19
Quasimodo's jar of misfortune cookies gets raided by Aunt Lydia when she tells Mavis of a misfortune foretelling her downfall as a child.
50a	24a	"Fangs for the Memories"	Ben Joseph	TBA	October 27, 2020	0.21
Mavis accidentally erases Jett Black's memories.
50b	24b	"Sleepers Creepers"	Josh Gal	TBA	October 27, 2020	0.21
All vampires must hibernate for twenty-four hours when the Chubacabra is on its way to the Hotel.
51a	25a	"Polterguest"	Alice Prodanou	TBA	October 28, 2020	0.17
Mavis rents out the Catwrights' house to spirits.
51b	25b	"Hair Raiser"	Emer Connon	TBA	October 28, 2020	0.17
Mavis tries to give herself a haircut that ends in disaster all over the Hotel after getting a cowlick.
52	26	"What Lycidias Beneath"	Mark Steinberg	Frank Lintzen	October 29, 2020	0.18
Mavis attempts to perform the Vamp Stamp, a move made infamous by her ancestor, Lycidias Dracula, that emits powerful shockwaves that can knock back any monster and human attack. But when Mavis disturbs his lost crypt, she unleashes an underworld of trouble. Dracula returns to help his sister and brother try to stop their ancestor from dominating the monster world again and release Mavis from his control. Mavis ultimately manages to overcome him by doing the powerful Vamp Stamp move. The spirit of Lycidias is trapped within Klaus' smoothie cup and locked in the basement. Dracula then makes the decision to remain at the Hotel in case other ancient threats emerge in order to keep his daughter safe, although Lydia remains at the Hotel. Wendy accidentally breaks the glass lantern and Lycidias' dark essence is released with the intent of causing great harm to both the Underworld and the monster world.: The title is a play on What Lies Beneath as reference to the ancient crypt of Lycidias Dracula being hidden deep underneath the Hotel.; Note: This episode is the series finale, and ends the series on an unresolved cliffhanger.
