= Bahia Watson =

Canadian actress and playwright (b. 1992)

- Born: May 15, 1992 (age 34); Carman, Manitoba, Canada
- Occupations: Actress; playwright
- Years active: 2015–present

Bahia Watson (born May 15, 1992) is a Canadian actress and playwright, best known for her recurring role as Brianna/Oferic in the television series The Handmaid's Tale.

== Early life ==
She grew up in Carman, Manitoba, the daughter of a Canadian father and a Guyanese mother.

== Career ==
In addition to The Handmaid's Tale she has had recurring roles as Sakai in The Expanse and May in Star Trek: Discovery; voice roles in Mysticons, Clifford the Big Red Dog, Big Blue, Total DramaRama, The Loud House, Strawberry Shortcake: Berry in the Big City, My Little Pony: Make Your Mark and Zokie of Planet Ruby and film roles in Foxfire: Confessions of a Girl Gang, What We Have, Cranks and The Archivists.

As a playwright she has been associated with Nightwood Theatre and d'bi Young's anitAFRIKA dub theatre, and has written cabaret stage shows with Liza Paul including pomme is french for apple and Mashup Pon Di Road.

As a cast member in The Handmaid's Tale, she is a two-time Screen Actors' Guild nominee for Outstanding Performance by an Ensemble in a Drama Series, receiving nods at the 25th Screen Actors Guild Awards in 2019 and at the 26th Screen Actors Guild Awards in 2020. She won the award for Outstanding Voice Performance — Female from the Toronto chapter of the ACTRA Awards in 2021 for Total Dramarama.
