= List of Rocket Monkeys episodes =

This is a list of episodes for the Teletoon animated series, Rocket Monkeys, which first premiered on January 10, 2013 in Canada.

On June 11, 2013, the series was renewed for a second season.

On October 15, 2014, the series was renewed for a third season.

== Series overview ==
In the original production order, the series only has two seasons, with the second one consisting of 39 half-hour (and one hour-long) episodes (78 segments), as seen in the end credits. This list follows the Teletoon broadcasting order, which labels the first 14 episodes as the second season and the last 26 as the third one.

Season	Episodes	Segments	Originally released	
Season	Episodes	Segments	First released	Last released
1	26	52	January 10, 2013	April 2, 2014
2	14	27	November 5, 2014	October 25, 2015
3	26	51	March 1, 2016	November 23, 2016

== Episodes ==
=== Season 1 (2013–14) ===
No. overall	No. in season	Title	Written by	Storyboard by	Original air date	Prod. code
1	1	"I Am Not a Banana" / "Scare-Larious"	Seán Cullen Greg Lawrence	Ian Freedman Maurice Sherwood	January 10, 2013	RM1-001/RM1-009
Lord Peel captures the Monkeys and intends to make them pay for turning him from a mild-mannered alien who happens to look a lot like a banana, into an embittered super villain obsessed with revenge. For Gus and Wally, scary equals funny, and they perform a series of pranks on each other to illustrate this comedic theory for YAY-OK. Not to be outdone, YAY-OK puts together a terrifying joke of his own.
2	2	"Inspection Day" / "Tail Fail"	Betsy Walters & Mark Evestaff Shawn Kalb	Russ Crispin Werner Marcus	January 17, 2013	RM1-007/RM1-015
It is Inspection Day, and the Rocket Monkeys are far from prepared. Gus thinks it will be easy enough to talk his way out of a bad report, but Wally's unhinged behavior threatens to interfere. A fitting for new space-suits reveals that Gus's tail has grown just enough to classify him as a rare long-tailed monkey, which attracts Gamester X, an alien determined to add Gus to his collection.
3	3	"Bro to Bro" / "Trick or Trixie"	Seán Cullen Alan Resnich	Steve LeCouilliard	January 24, 2013	RM1-014/RM1-005
After challenging the undefeated Space Gorillas to a match on the popular game show "Galactic Laser Blast!", Gus decides the only way the Monkeys can win is to bring in a ringer—YAY-OK. Wally finally gets his own pet: Trixie, a toothy beast with an appetite for EVERYTHING, from the monkeys' food supply to the ship itself. As much as it hurts Wally, insatiable Trixie must be stopped.
4	4	"My Dad-Bot, the Doom-Bot" / "Monkey Mitts!"	Betsy Walters Jenn Engels	Ian Freedman Steve Evangelatos	January 31, 2013	RM1-016/RM1-018
Gus and Wally have a surprise for YAY-OK: they have located his estranged father. But YAY-OK has mixed emotions, as it turns out his dad is actually a doomsday device that had been powered-down for the good of all mankind. Tired of Wally always touching his stuff, Gus gets his brother to promise "paws off." But when Wally's faced with Gus's Deep Space Dave laboratory play set, the temptation may prove too much.
5	5	"Not Lord Peel" / "Once Upon a Monkey"	Greg Lawrence Shawn Kalb	Marlon Deane Craig George	February 7, 2013	RM1-012/RM1-020
Gus and Wally are shocked when their mom reveals her new suitor, Lord Peel. To prove he is a changed man, Banana-dude insists on highly hazardous, monkey-endangering fun. An unfortunate haircutting accident reveals the crown-shaped royal birthmark of Eld under Wally's fur and his royal destiny as the rescuer of the frozen Princess Von Monkey.
6	6	"Love on the Run" / "Monkey Hearts"	Craig Martin Seán Cullen	Marlon Deane Scott Underwood	February 14, 2013	RM1-008/RM1-024
Mission: escort criminal mastermind Monkevil to the prison on Alfatraz 8. No problem, until their prisoner turns out to be a beautiful female monkey who soon has Gus and Wally fighting for her love. GASI has a new recruit: Monkevil, former super villain, and Gus and Wally's long standing crush. Though she excels during training, YAY-OK suspects that she has returned to her life of crime.
7	7	"Tail of the Unexpected" / "Golden Nugglets"	Seán Cullen Craig Martin	Steve Evangelatos Maurice Sherwood	February 21, 2013	RM1-010/RM1-017
Nefarious's latest evil invention gives him control over Wally's tail. Tired of always being assigned the lamest missions, Gus and Wally seek out lost pirate treasure.
8	8	"Zombie Bananas" / "I'm YAY-OK, You're Not YAY-OK"	Shawn Kalb Alan Resnick	Pat Pakula Scott Underwood	March 7, 2013	RM1-011/RM1-013
A batch of toxic bananas has infiltrated the market, zombifying any primate who takes a bite, including Wally. Gus must travel to the bananas' source planet and find a cure for the zombie germ. When Gus blames YAY-OK for his own mistake during a training exercise, Dr. Chimpsky sends them YAY-OK7, an updated replacement who is quick to assert his superiority over the original model.
9	9	"When Garbage Revolts" / "Monkeys vs. Gorillas"	Jenn Engels Shawn Kalb	Alex Basio Donna Brockopp	March 14, 2013	RM1-003/RM1-002
The Monkeys are on lockdown until they clean their ship. Desperate to make it to All-You-Can-Eat-Monkey-Mondays at the GASI Café, they take a few shortcuts—and end up waking a hideous garbage monster. When the trash-talking Space Gorillas hijack Gus's mission, the 'Rilla-Monkey rivalry returns with a vengeance. To redeem themselves, the Rocket Monkeys take on their most dangerous mission yet.
10	10	"B.A.L.L." / "Ukulele Wally"	Alex Galatis	Pat Pakula Steve Evangelatos & Maurice Sherwood	March 21, 2013	RM1-019/RM1-006
Gus and Wally cannot help themselves when it comes to anything round and bouncy—which makes it awkward when Chimpsky entrusts them with the highly explosive BALL (Ballistic and Lethally Loaded). Gus takes a game of Trash Torpedo too far, shooting Wally's beloved ukulele into space. To get it back, the Monkeys must face Pinky-Winky, a mean-girl space creature with musical plans of her own.
11	11	"Princess Nefarious" / "Home on the Strange"	Josh Saltzman Shawn Kalb	Steve LeCouilliard Steve Evangelatos	March 28, 2013	RM1-004/RM1-022
Gus and Wally only need one more badge before they receive the prestigious GASI Red Tassel of Achievement, so when the opportunity arises to save a stranded princess, the boys jump at the chance. Gus and Wally are charged with herding 2000 Zortoids through space for their annual feeding at Gluttonia, but Wally must face a test of his monkey ethics when he befriends one of the herd.
12	12	"Space Out!" / "Monkey See, Monkey Do Better"	Betsy Walters Jenn Engels	Maurice Sherwood Donna Brockopp	April 4, 2013	RM1-026/RM1-027
Gus and Wally win the "Have-Deep-Space-Dave-Stay-at-Your-Place" contest, but Deep Space Dave proves to be an annoyance as the Monkeys tend to his every need. A dangerous comet threatens to demolish Gus and Wally's beloved Banana Snack Shack.
13	13	"Bro or Joel" / "There's No Business Like Monkey Business"	Alan Resnick Greg Lawrence	Craig George Werner Marcus	April 11, 2013	RM1-025/RM1-028
Gus rescues a cool monkey named Joel and they quickly become best friends, but this new pal has a suspicious interest in Inky's highly collectible splatter art. Lord Peel is out to expose the Rocket Monkeys' incompetence on his new tell-all television show, and the resulting backlash has Dr. Chimpsky insisting Gus and Wally change their ways.
14	14	"The Peel Who Stole Christmas" / "Ships, Trips and Wormholes"	Josh Saltzman Seán Cullen	Scott Underwood Marlon Deane	December 12, 2013	RM1-029/RM1-030
Lord Peel seeks revenge on Gus and Wally by impersonating Santa and tricking them. Gus and Wally try to get to a Christmas party before all the cake there is eaten.
15	15	"Banana Ghost" / "One and a Half Friends"	Mark Evestaff Seán Cullen	Werner Marcus Maurice Sherwood	January 8, 2014	RM1-032/RM1-036
Wally sets out to return the delicious spirits of every banana he's eaten to their home planet. Looking to expand his social circle, Wally reaches out to Spacebook-and instantly has hundreds of friends.
16	16	"Robot Plague" / "May the Best Monkey Win"	Shawn Kalb Seán Cullen	Pat Pakula Steve LeCouilliard	January 15, 2014	RM1-031/RM1-035
Gus makes a monster movie and posts it on Space Book (a parody of Facebook). The whole galaxy except YAY-OK and the monkeys think that YAY-OK has a disease because it was viral. YAY-OK is put in charge by Dr. Chimpsky to decide whether Gus or Wally should be in charge of their money, after they blow all of GASI's budget on a shopping spree.
17	17	"The Chimpsky Dimension" / "License to Monkey Around"	Alan Resnick Shawn Kalb	Steve Evangelatos Andy Bartlett	January 22, 2014	RM1-033/RM1-034
Gus and Wally let evil counterparts enter the world. Gus and Wally lose their fun privileges.
18	18	"My Bully Bot" / "Switch Day"	Betsy Walters Josh Saltzman	Pat Pakula Ian Freedman	January 29, 2014	RM1-021/RM1-037
YAY-OK becomes a bully when the monkeys re-wire him. On GASI's "Switch Day," where everyone gets a new partner, the monkeys both end up getting a gorilla as their partner.
19	19	"Flearoy" / "The Inventor"	Miles Smith Seán Cullen	Steve LeCouilliard Pat Pakula	February 5, 2014	RM1-039/RM1-041
Wally has a flea who eats almost everything on the ship and hypnotizes him attached to his head. YAY-OK meets his creator who thinks he is no good anymore and hurts his feelings.
20	20	"Party Planet" / "Spacey Cake"	Matt Atkinson Betsy Walters	Steve Evangelatos Andy Bartlett, Craig George & Eduardo Soriano	February 12, 2014	RM1-042/RM1-045
When the Monkeys are relegated to the kids' room at a party, Gus decides to infiltrate the adult festivities next door. While combing the dump for replacement rocket parts, Wally stumbles upon a Spacey Cake oven.
21	21	"Welcome to Inky Mart" / "Eggs and Breakin'"	Shawn Kalb Alan Resnick	Maurice Sherwood Steve LeCouilliard	February 26, 2014	RM1-040/RM1-051
Gus and Wally use all of Inky's ink so they must get more. Gus and Wally keeping an animal.
22	22	"Teeny Weeny Pinky Winky" / "Robo Butler"	Greg Lawrence Dave Dias	Donna Brockopp & Brad Neave Scott Underwood	March 5, 2014	RM1-023/RM1-047
Gus and Wally discover the truth about Pinky Winky's real size. YAY-OK takes a job as a butler for Lord Peel.
23	23	"Squidsgiving" / "Rocket Mommy"	Josh Saltzman Miles Smith	Brad Neave Werner Marcus	March 12, 2014	RM1-044/RM1-043
Nefarious finally gets to leave his asteroid, only to see his family. The Monkeys mom comes to visit.
24	24	"Big Bro Rules" / "Monkey Too Young"	Greg Lawrence Mark Evestaff	Ian Freedman Maurice Sherwood	March 19, 2014	RM1-049/RM1-046
Gus teaches Wally about survival, while on a stranded planet. Wally believes he can take on anything.
25	25	"Sidekicked" / "Wedding Smashers"	Shawn Kalb Josh Saltzman	Steve LeCouilliard, Gord McBride & Maurice Sherwood Russ Crispin	March 26, 2014	RM1-052/RM1-048
Gus and Wally compete to become a sidekick. He-Rilla & She-Rilla are getting married but Gus hurts She-Rilla's feelings at the wedding and he must make her feel better again.
26	26	"Happy Gus Day" / "Monkey Proof"	Laurie Elliott Betsy Walters	Russ Crispin Steve Evangelatos	April 2, 2014	RM1-038/RM1-050
Gus has never liked birthdays, but he gives in and opens what he assumes is Wally's birthday surprise - a box of Green Goo. To keep the Monkeys safe, YAY-OK purchases a state-of-the-art primate protection device.

=== Season 2 (2014–15) ===
No. overall	No. in season	Title	Written by	Storyboard by	Original release date	Prod. code
27	1	"Monkey-Itis" / "Deep Space Disco"	Shawn Kalb Josh Saltzman	Gary Ferguson Toren Atkinson & Marta Demong	November 5, 2014	RM2-056/RM2-061
Thinking that Gus has caught the fatal and fictional disease "Monkey-Itis", Wally tries to make his brother's last days as comfortable as possible, no matter how much he hurts him in the process. In order to hide Deep Space Dave from a fire-breathing beast, Wally turns the rocket ship into a disco club.
28	2	"Hot to Bot" / "Smell Monkey Smell"	Mark Evestaff Josh Saltzman	Mike Grimshaw & Werner Marcus Maurice Sherwood	November 12, 2014	RM2-053/RM2-062
A short-tempered robot named Belindor steals Yay-Ok's "robo-mojo" as revenge for ignoring her in high school. In an attempt to out-do the Space Gorilla's best-selling fragrance, Gus and Wally create Monké, a horrifying smell of their own.
29	3	"Always a Monkey, Never a Bride" / "Going Bananas"	Alan Resnick Seán Cullen	Andy Bartlett Jeff Barker	November 19, 2014	RM2-054/RM2-060
Monkevil refuses to marry a giant insect beast, but the groom will not take no for an answer, so Wally disguises himself as the girl monkey and takes her place. Gus and Wally win a trip to "Banana Fun Land", which turns out to be a ruse by Lord Peel in order to trap them on a deserted planet. However, when Banana-Man (Lord Peel) gets stuck in there as well, he starts bonding with the monkeys.
30	4	"Monkey's Best Friend" / "Dude, Where's My Dad?"	Seán Cullen Betsy Walters	Toren Atkinson & Sidne Marat Maurice Sherwood	November 26, 2014	RM2-059/RM2-064
Nefarious, disguised as Inky, manages to get inside the rocket ship, but ends up in the middle of a competition of affection between Gus and Wally. The monkeys find their long-lost father frozen in a block of ice and are thrilled to spend some quality time with him, but first they must teach the middle-aged monkey to overcome his old-school mannerisms.
31	5	"The Doctor is Out" / "Destroy All Bananas"	Betsy Walters Shawn Kalb	Werner Marcus, Pat Pakula & Sidne Marat Dan Hughes	December 3, 2014	RM2-057/RM2-055
Thanks to the monkeys, Chimpsky loses his job and is demoted to a Jr. Jr. Jr. Rocket Monkey 3rd class. Gus and Wally take advantage of their 2nd class status and make the former GASI chief do their bidding. Lord Peel has a new plan: get the monkeys to hate bananas. While he does succeed at first, things take a horrible turn when Gus and Wally are determined to eradicate every single banana in the galaxy.
32	6	"Three Wild & Crazy Monkeys" / "OK Baby Yay"	Shawn Kalb Alan Resnick	Emmett Hall Maurice Sherwood	December 10, 2014	RM2-065/RM2-063
Gus and Wally find out that their old college roommate Cornelius J. Simian is now a scientist and take him for a day of partying to revive the good ol' days. However, without Simian's surveillance, his galaxy-destroying weapon "Blackhole-Inator" is activated. It's "Robot Appreciation Day", so Wally and Gus give Yay-Ok a baby-robot for him to take care of. However, the little bot takes more of a liking to the monkeys than his own father.
33	7	"Sharing is Caring" / "Mega Gamgam"	Betsy Walters Mark Edwards	Toren Atkinson Dan Hughes	January 8, 2015	RM2-069/RM2-068
The monkeys go to dangerous lengths to prove who can out-share the other. Gus and Wally are supposed to be taking care of their grandmother.
34	8	"Rock On" / "Thunderbot"	Seán Cullen Shawn Kalb	Maurice Sherwood Sidne Marat	January 15, 2015	RM2-070/RM2-072
When Wally discovers that he is able to coax music from a rock, a jealous Gus tries to prove that said rock is alive and making the music on its own. When Gamester X discovers that Yay-Ok was the star of the superhero show Thunderbot, he captures the robot in order to make a series finale, as the original show ended on a cliffhanger.
35	9	"I Am a Banana" / "Day of the Doodah"	Laurie Elliott Betsy Walters	Emmett Hall Werner Marcus	January 22, 2015	RM2-071/RM2-073
After admitting he is a banana, Lord Peel organizes a commemorative "Banana Day Parade" in order to lure Gus and Wally off a cliff. However, he also falls off and lands nearby a family of banana hillbillies, whose daughter wants to marry Peel. A doodah gives Gus and Wally one of his wish feathers as a reward for saving his life. But the duo want more feathers, so they put the bird-like alien through several dangers in order to save him again and again.
36	10	"Wally Day" / "Monkey Trial"	Laurie Elliott Alan Resnick	Glen Lovet Pat Pakula	January 29, 2015	RM2-058/RM2-066
Wally refuses to share his birthday party with Nefarious, who has been invited aboard the rocket ship for the day. When Yay-Ok starts to feel old, he gives himself a hip new upgrade. However, a misunderstanding causes Gus and Wally to believe that this new robot has killed their old pal, so they put him on trial.
37	11	"Franken-Banana" / "Attack of the Werebot"	Seán Cullen Alan Resnick	Toren Atkinson Marta Demong	February 5, 2015	RM2-074/RM2-067
Lord Peel finds a way to ruin Halloween. Gus turns Yay-Ok into a werebot in order to prove that they exist.
38	12	"The Tattler" / "The Button"	Mark Edwards Shawn Kalb	Maurice Sherwood Steve Evangelatos	February 12, 2015	RM2-076/RM2-075
Someone on the ship has been tattling to Dr. Chimpsky. After some investigations, Gus, Wally and Yay-Ok soon find the culprit: the house plant. The monkeys are excited to see the premiere of the new Deep Space Dave movie, but their plans are thwarted when Chimpsky gives them an incredibly boring mission: repeatedly push a button to avoid freeing a giant monster.
39	13	"Bananarchy" / "The Boom-Boom Tree"	Betsy Walters Norm Lauzon	Marshall Fels Elliott Sidne Marat	February 26, 2015	RM3-079/RM2-078
Yay-Ok encounters Belindor again, who hypnotises him into staying with her and doing whatever she wants. The monkeys try to stop her in order to save their robot pal and see the new wrestling event: Bananarchy. After a misunderstanding causes Gus and Wally to cut down the Boom-Boom Tree, home of the nearly extinct Boom-Boom, they are forced to take care of the homeless annoying creature while a new tree is grown in "about a hundred years."
40	14	"Terrors and Tiaras"	Alex Galatis, Betsy Walters & Mark Evestaff	Emmett Hall, Gary Ferguson, Marshall Fels Elliott & Werner Marcus	October 25, 2015	RM-001
The citizens of GASI headquarters start disappearing from a bright blue flash and the monkeys plus YAY-OK must save them. They have also turned into princess monsters created by an evil princess named Princess Monstare. Eventually YAY-OK tries to fight her, but she turns into a robot with him and the monkeys must save him and stop her.

=== Season 3 (2016) ===
No. overall	No. in season	Title	Written by	Storyboard by	Canadian air date	Prod. code	Polish air date
41	1	"Live and Not Learn" / "So Mature"	Seán Cullen Josh Saltzman	Werner Marcus Pat Pakula	March 1, 2016	RM3-082/RM2-077	November 2, 2015
Gus and Wally have a new and very important mission: build a protective orb around an extremely unstable quasar. After they make the orb as best as possible, they just then realize the door knob is missing, leaving them stuck inside the sphere as well. When Yay-Ok's robo-ripener hits Wally, it gives him a mustache, which means he is now the more mature monkey. This makes Gus jealous, especially when the new facial hair causes Monkevil to start falling in love with his brother.
42	2	"Robogas" / "Chez Corny"	Laurie Elliott Betsy Walters	Maurice Sherwood Steve Geeves	March 1, 2016	RM3-081/RM3-080	November 3, 2015
The monkeys realize Yay-OK is holding in all his robo-gas. The monkeys ruin their old friend Cornelius' career.
43	3	"Little Monkey Lies" / "Bot on Top"	Seán Cullen Shelley Hoffman & Robert Pincombe	Marshall Fels Elliott Sidne Marat	March 8, 2016	RM3-085/RM3-087	November 4, 2015
Gus stretches the truth about his heroic missions and wins several awards, sparking interest from Wally. When Gus and Wally unknowingly leave YAY-OK stuck on top of the rocket ship, the two must prove that they are independent during what they think is a zombie attack.
44	4	"Monkeys Gone Wild" / "Zargles"	Shelley Hoffman & Robert Pincombe Mark Edwards	Jeff Barker Marta Demong	March 15, 2016	RM3-088/RM3-086	November 5, 2015
Do-gooder documentarian Jane Goodspace (a parody of Jane Goodall) attempts to rescue the monkeys from their ship and return them to their natural habitat. When the monkeys keep saying "Zargles!", YAY-OK gets annoyed and tries to make them not say it, even if it takes a gazillion times... or more.
45	5	"A Fistful of Sniggets" / "Take a Picture"	Alan Resnick Seán Cullen	Toren Atkinson Emmett Hall	March 22, 2016	RM3-089/RM3-092	November 6, 2015
Gus steals sodas from a vending machine, which tries to reclaim its lost drinks. There is a villain that the monkeys do not know a lot about and in order to they must get new security photos.
46	6	"Rimsky Chimpsky" / "Poppin' Balloonskys"	Mark Edwards Shelley Hoffman & Robert Pincombe	Pat Pakula Maurice Sherwood	April 2, 2016	RM3-090/RM3-093	November 7, 2015
Dr. Chimpsky's nephew visits, but he is not who he says he is. The monkeys try to return alien balloons to their home planet.
47	7	"Call Me Adorable" / "Doom to Go"	Alan Resnick Betsy Walters	Jeff Barker Steve Geeves	April 9, 2016	RM3-083/RM3-084	November 8, 2015
Wally is the most adorable agent, but as soon as a rocket bunny hits the scene, Wally gets an adorable makeover in order to become more adorable than the bunny once again. YAY-OK loses a "Robot of the Year" pageant and he must prove to his dad that he does not have to work with him. He wants to be with the monkeys more.
48	8	"Searching for Squamitch" / "Monkey in the Mirror"	Norm Lauzon Laurie Elliott	Marshall Fels Elliott Dennis Crawford	April 16, 2016	RM3-096/RM3-098	November 9, 2015
The monkeys go camping and come across Lord Peel, but mistake him for Squamitch. Gus and Wally desperately try to prove that they are different from one another, which interferes in their newest GASI mission.
49	9	"Gus-Gus-Wally" / "Squidland"	Seán Cullen Mark Edwards	Sidne Marat Jeff Barker & Marta Demong	April 23, 2016	RM3-099/RM3-091	November 10, 2015
The ship flies through a dimensional hoop and picks up an extra Gus, leaving Wally as the odd monkey out. Gus and Wally want to go to a new, but highly suspicious amusement park.
50	10	"Banana Fairy" / "The Brainians"	Greg Lawrence Laurie Elliott	Marta Demong Emmett Hall	April 30, 2016	RM3-097/RM3-094	November 11, 2015
When Wally loses a tooth he eagerly waits for the banana fairy to put a golden banana under his pillow, but she has retired and Gamester X replaces her using the monkey teeth to build things. The monkeys and YAY-OK try to get her to give the monkeys their golden bananas because Gus also lost a tooth in process. Wally messes up the delivery of an alien brain, which actually boosts his IQ.
51	11	"Walk a Mile in His Peel" / "Hive-Five"	Miles Smith Jeremy Winkels	Pat Pakula Maurice Sherwood	May 7, 2016	RM3-095/RM3-100	November 12, 2015
Lord Peel finds an abandoned baby Hate-a-Saurus and tries to raise it to destroy the monkeys. Wally hides Space Bees in the ship and declares himself queen bee.
52	12	"This One's Got Legs" / "The Other Room"	Jeremy Winkels Mark Edwards	Toren Atkinson Dennis Crawford	May 14, 2016	RM3-102/RM3-103	November 13, 2015
When the monkeys work YAY-OK too hard, he loses his wheel. His inventor comes and gives him a fancy pair of legs, until he can make YAY-OK a new wheel. The monkeys want to take a peek inside the "little girls room" (a bathroom for girls), but YAY-OK is guarding the door to it and would not let them inside.
53	13	"Box Full of Monkeys" / "Mom Loves Me More"	Laurie Elliott "Seán Cullen	Steve Geeves "Marshall Fels Elliott	May 21, 2016	RM3-106/RM3-105	November 14, 2015
Gus and Wally transform a cardboard box into the S.S. Monkeyship. The monkeys keep on pretending to be hurt, so they can get more treats from their mom.
54	14	"Chimpsky-a-Go-Go" / "The Yell in Yellow"	Miles Smith Jeremy Winkels	Pat Pakula Maurice Sherwood	November 7, 2016	RM3-107/RM3-108	March 28, 2016
Dr. Chimpsky has a party, but no one comes to it. The monkeys and YAY-OK try to turn this around for him. Lord Peel tries to make the monkeys afraid of the color yellow.
55	15	"Room to Panic" / "Too Not Cool for School"	Laurie Elliott Mark Evestaff	Sidne Marat Emmett Hall	November 8, 2016	RM3-101/RM3-111	March 29, 2016
YAY-OK shows the monkeys a panic room and they keep on making up emergencies so they can go inside. YAY-OK gets annoyed with this. When Yay-OK goes back to school to finish his degree, he discovers that it has changed a lot since he was last a student.
56	16	"Try to Ketchup" / "YAY-Monkay"	Laurie Elliott Norm Lauzon	Dennis Crawford Toren Atkinson	November 9, 2016	RM3-112/RM3-109	March 30, 2016
When Gus and Wally cannot open a ketchup bottle to put on their favorite banana bread, they enlist the help of GASI's most wanted criminals to open it for them. Gus and Wally trick Yay-OK into believing he's turned into a monkey. But when the robot goes all out with his simian silliness, the monkeys realize they've pushed the joke too far.
57	17	"A Very Monkey Christmas"	Mark Evestaff & Betsy Walters	Marshall Fels Elliott and Emmett Hall	November 10, 2016	RM3-115/RM3-116	March 31, 2016
The monkeys learn that they're on Santa's super-naughty list for Christmas and have to do one good deed before the midnight bell rings.
58	18	"General Cluck" / "Say it Ain't Bro"	Mark Edwards Josh Saltzman	Steve Geeves Sidne Marat	November 11, 2016	RM3-114/RM3-110	April 1, 2016
Gus and Wally break the butt off the statue of GASI's most decorated general. A fight over Monkevil's affections causes a rift between Gus and Wally.
59	19	"So Sorry" / "Banana Buddies"	Norm Lauzon Alan Resnick	Marta Demong Toren Atkinson	November 14, 2016	RM3-119/RM3-104	April 2, 2016
Gus and Wally stumble on the concept of apologising. Lord Peel is trying to join a fancy social club, and enlists the Rocket Monkeys for help.
60	20	"Nefarious's Slumber Party" / "Doom for One More"	Seán Cullen Alan Resnick	Maurice Sherwood Werner Marcus	November 15, 2016	RM3-118/RM3-113	April 3, 2016
Nefarious invites the Rocket Monkeys to a slumber party so that he can steal their rocket ship, but struggles to keep the two monkeys asleep. When Yay-OK's younger sister comes to visit, he tries to keep her away from Gus and Wally.
61	21	"The Long Goodbye" / "Brobot Knows Best"	Laurie Elliott Emil Sher	Dennis Crawford Sean Scott	November 16, 2016	RM3-117/RM3-120	April 4, 2016
It turns out that Inky is a rental, and his lease period is up. Bernice and Yay-OK get into a disagreement over whom the Rocket Monkeys love more.
62	22	"Flipping Out" / "What Does the Clam Say?"	James Nadler Seán Cullen	Steve Geeves Marshall Fels Eliott	November 17, 2016	RM3-121/RM3-123	April 5, 2016
Gus and Wally discover a mysterious "Switch of Doom", which of course they cannot stop flipping. When Gus stiffs a waiter on his tip, the server seeks revenge with a cursed bucket of fortune clams.
63	23	"TopBot" / "Bananas vs. Robots"	Mark Edwards Evan Thaler Hickey	Sidne Marat Werner Marcus & Maurice Sherwood	November 18, 2016	RM3-122/RM3-124	April 6, 2016
Yay-OK wants to compete on his favourite reality game show, 'Top Bot', but has to convince Gus and Wally to nominate him first. After an epic war between robots and bananas breaks out, YAY-OK puts the monkeys into a deep cryogenic sleep to prevent them from suffering. The monkeys sleep for 1000 years and YAY-OK and Lord Peel fight.
64	24	"Bucket Full of Brobot" / "Adventures in Robo-sitting"	Seán Cullen Audrey Velichka	Dennis Crawford Emmett Hall	November 21, 2016	RM3-125/RM3-126	April 7, 2016
Yay-OK needs a break from all the crazy monkey shenanigans, so he activates a copy of himself to cover for him while he goes to a spa. However, when the monkeys destroy the clone, they think that the real Yay-OK is a ghost seeking revenge. When Yay-OK gets sick due to a virus that the monkeys downloaded on him, he tries to call Slo-Mo to take care of him. Nefarious overhears him and disguises himself as the female robot in order to gain control of the rocket ship.
65	25	"Best Enemies" / "Optical Delusion"	Mark Edwards Evan Thaler Hickey	Werner Marcus Pat Pakula	November 22, 2016	RM3-128/RM3-129	April 8, 2016
Deep Space Dave and the Purple Puzzler are not talking. If the monkeys ever want to see their favorite show again, it's up to them to reunite the stars. When Gus's new glasses up his stock considerably, a jealous Wally purchases a questionable knock-off pair, with horrifying results.
66	26	"Yuk Yuk Yay-Ok" / "The Last Peel"	Laurie Elliott Betsy Walters	Marta Demong Dennis Crawford	November 23, 2016	RM3-127/RM3-130	April 9, 2016
Yay-Ok's popular comedy routine is fueled by monkey jokes, but Gus and Wally find out and refuse to give him any more material. In the series finale, Yay-OK takes us behind-the-scenes of Rocket Monkeys. Meanwhile, Lord Peel tries to get the show cancelled so he can leave for good.
