= David Berni =

Canadian actor

- Other names: Dave Berni; David Bernie
- Occupations: Actor; voice actor; writer; comedian
- Years active: 1989–present

David Berni is a Canadian actor and writer.

== Life and career ==
Berni is best known for voicing Frank on Go, Dog. Go!, Bernie on Ollie's Pack and Bird Bud on The Snoopy Show. He is also known for voicing Brent Mclean and Hector on Cloudy with a Chance of Meatballs, Count Dracula on Hotel Transylvania, and Gawayne on Mysticons.

Berni has been nominated for 3 Canadian Screen Awards (Gemini Awards) in the Best Performance category for his work on Rocket Monkeys, Ruby Gloom, and Iggy Arbuckle. He has also been nominated for 4 ACTRA Awards in the Best Performance category for his work on Ollie's Pack, Cloudy With a Chance of Meatballs: The Series, Rocket Monkeys, and Almost Naked Animals.

Berni received critical praise for his uncanny portrayal of hockey superstar Phil Esposito, in the TV mini-series Canada Russia '72. In the advertising world, he has voiced numerous commercials for companies such as Doritos, Pepsi, McDonald's, Volvo, and Kelloggs.

== Filmography ==
=== Film and television ===
Year	Title	Role	Notes
1993	Secret Service	Romano	Episodes "The High Cost of Living" and "Imposters"
1993	Street Legal	Constable Stewart	Episode "Forgiveness"
1994–1996	The Busy World of Richard Scarry	Bananas Gorilla, additional voices	TV series
1994	PCU	Jock #1	Film, minor role
1995	A Family of Cops	Wiseguy	Film, minor role
1996	Night of the Twisters	Policeman in gym	Film, minor role
1999	Earth: Final Conflict	Dr. Stark	Episode "Bliss"
2000	George Shrinks	Steve Levy	Episode "Zoopercar Caper"
2001	Queer as Folk	Jeep Salesman	Episode "Smells Like Codependence"
2003	Beyblade G-Revolution	Garland Siebald	
2004	Wild Card	Sam the Bartender	Episode "Candy Land"
2006	Canada Russia '72	Phil Esposito	Film, main role
2006	Yin Yang Yo!	Sarcastico / Mollecu-Lars / Flaviour / Herman the Ant	Recurring roles
2006–2008	Growing Up Creepie	Pauly Creecher	TV series, main role
2006–2008	Ruby Gloom	Frank	TV series, main role
2007	Iggy Arbuckle	Jiggers	TV series, main role
2008	MetaJets	Crusher	TV series, main role
2009–2010	The Dating Guy	Leonard	TV series
2009	Zeke's Pad	Agent #1 / Agent #2	Episode: King Of The Pad
2009–2010	Pearlie	Gobsmack	TV series, main role
2010	Spliced	Sid	Episodes "Pink" and "Mole-sters in the Mist"
2011–2013	Almost Naked Animals	Duck	TV series, main role
2011–2013	Scaredy Squirrel	Paddy / Buck	TV series, recurring roles
2011–2015	Detentionaire	Chaz Moneranian	TV series, recurring role
2012	Fugget About It	Sammy	Episode: "Cousin Sammy Dies at the End"
2012–2013	The Doozers	Baker Timber Bolt / Doozer Doodad / Professor Gimbal	9 episodes
2013–2016	Rocket Monkeys	YAY-OK	TV series, main role
2013	Emma's Wings: A Bella Sara Tale	Uncle Morgan	
2013	Camp Lakebottom	Starling / Tooth Troll	Episode: "Welcome to Buttcon"
2013	Mother Up!	Cueball / Popovic	Episode: "The Double D's"
2014	Numb Chucks	Reckless Randall	Episode: "Moosetaken Identity"
2015	Bark Ranger	Spike	Film, minor role
2015	Little Charmers	Ogre Clock / Ogre Vivian	3 episodes
2015	Get Squrriely	Exterminator / M.C. Voice / Skunk	Film, minor role
2016	Looped	Wonder Brad / Mr. Merton	3 episodes
2016	Make It Pop	Mr. Anderson	Episode: "Spring Fling"
2016	Winston Steinburger and Sir Dudley Ding Dong	Face-Eating Monster	Episode: "The Most Important Meal Of The Day"
2017–2018	Cloudy with a Chance of Meatballs	Baby Brent / Hector / Jim	TV series, recurring role
2017–2018	Hotel Transylvania: The Series	Dracula	TV series, recurring role (Season 1)
2017–2018	Mysticons	Gawayne the Great	TV series, recurring role
2018–2022	Let's Go Luna!	Hockbar	TV series, recurring role
2019–2021	Norman Picklestripes	Bob	TV series, main role
2020	Ollie's Pack	Bernie	TV series, main role
2021–2023	Go, Dog. Go!	Frank	TV series, recurring role
