= Ollie's Pack =

Canadian animated television series

- Genre: Comedy
- Created by: Pedro Eboli; Graham Peterson
- Developed by: Mark Satterthwaite
- Directed by: Adrian Thatcher
- Voices of: James Hartnett; Ana Sani; David Berni
- Theme music composer: Andy Delisi; John Mavro
- Composer: Remy Perrin
- Country of origin: Canada
- Original language: English
- No. of seasons: 1
- No. of episodes: 27 (51 segments)

Production
- Executive producers: Scott Dyer; Pam Westman; Graham Peterson; Pedro Eboli
- Producer: Kristen Hudecki
- Running time: 22 minutes
- Production company: Nelvana Limited

Original release
- Network: YTV
- Release: April 6, 2020 – May 6, 2021

Ollie's Pack is a Canadian animated comedy television series created by Pedro Eboli and Graham Peterson and directed by Adrian Thatcher. It was produced by Nelvana and aired on YTV in Canada. In the United States, it premiered on Nickelodeon on April 6, 2020. The final few episodes aired on Nicktoons from May 3 to 6, 2021.

On March 28, 2024, the series was removed from Paramount+ as part of a "strategic decision to focus on content with mass global appeal."

== Premise ==
Ollie and his backpack are doubled as a powerful portal allowing an array of monsters to travel from the monsterverse into Ollie's world on Earth. Throughout the series, Ollie and his two best friends must protect the earth from the horrifying monsters that have escaped, while often utilizing the helpful monsters who assist with their everyday tween problems, like sneaking into a movie or winning their school's Battle of the Bands contest. No matter the circumstances, Ollie's thirst for adventure undoubtedly gets him into trouble that only he and his friends can resolve.

== Characters ==
- Ollie (voiced by James Hartnett)
- Cleo (voiced by Ana Sani)
- Bernie (voiced by David Berni)

== Production ==
The series originated from a short titled Monster Pack, created as part of the annual Nickelodeon Animated Shorts Program. On March 2, 2020, Nickelodeon announced that the series would premiere in April 2020. Pedro Eboli and Graham Peterson created the series.

The 26-episode action-comedy series was produced by Nelvana. On March 30, 2020, it was announced that the series would premiere on April 6, 2020.

== Episodes ==
All episodes were directed by Adrian Thatcher.

No.	Title	Written by	Original release date	Prod. code	U.S. viewers (millions)
Nickelodeon
1	"The Chosen One...Stinks"	Aaron Eves	April 6, 2020	103	0.55
1	"Not Another Superhero Movie"	Jeff Sager	April 6, 2020	103	0.55
2	"New Kid on Campus"	Kyle Dooley	April 7, 2020	101	0.46
2	"The Chosen One(s)"	Joel Buxton	April 7, 2020	101	0.46
3	"Lord of the Caf"	Jocelyn Geddie	April 8, 2020	106	0.41
3	"Doom for Rent"	Mike Girard	April 8, 2020	106	0.41
4	"Sorry to Father You"	Jeff Sager	April 9, 2020	110	0.49
4	"Race to Sploosh Mountain"	Mike Girard	April 9, 2020	110	0.49
5	"Major Snooch"	Kyle Dooley	April 13, 2020	102	0.64
5	"We're With the Band"	Mark Satterthwaite	April 13, 2020	102	0.64
6	"King Swelly Belly"	Etan Muskat	April 14, 2020	109	0.61
6	"Yard Sale Fail"	Mark Purdy	April 14, 2020	109	0.61
7	"Cleo for President"	Mark Satterthwaite	April 15, 2020	105	0.72
7	"The Janitor"	Mike Girard	April 15, 2020	105	0.72
8	"Charmed and Dangerous"	Joel Buxton	April 16, 2020	107	0.67
8	"Science Unfair"	Kyle Dooley	April 16, 2020	107	0.67
9	"Hollie Monitor"	Kyle Dooley	May 11, 2020	113	0.53
9	"Sister Save Me"	Adam Pateman	May 11, 2020	113	0.53
10	"Cool Hand Wowski"	Mike Girard	May 12, 2020	111	0.39
10	"Big Bern"	James Hartnett	May 12, 2020	111	0.39
11	"Getting Oldie With It"	Aaron Eves	May 13, 2020	127	0.37
11	"Lil' Baby Ollie"	Matt Baram	May 13, 2020	127	0.37
12	"Ollie Dogs"	Nick Flanagan	May 14, 2020	108	0.42
12	"Camp Magna"	Aaron Eves	May 14, 2020	108	0.42
13	"The Chosening"	Kyle Dooley	June 29, 2020	116	0.53
13	"Crush it Ollie"	Jocelyn Geddie	June 29, 2020	116	0.53
14	"Ollie Doubles Down"	Christine Mitchell	June 30, 2020	117	0.55
14	"The Great Grade Grab"	Emer Connon	June 30, 2020	117	0.55
15	"Chancy Rancy"	Aaron Eves	July 1, 2020	114	0.46
15	"The Monsters V. Ollie Allen"	Jeff Sager	July 1, 2020	114	0.46
16	"History of Portshill"	Jeff Sager	July 2, 2020	115	0.53
16	"Trio's a Crowd"	Kyle Dooley	July 2, 2020	115	0.53
17	"Ollie's Monster Club"	Aaron Eves	September 21, 2020	118	0.42
17	"Ollie's Shadow"	John Hazlett	September 21, 2020	118	0.42
18	"Slice of Life"	Ben Joseph	September 22, 2020	119	0.42
18	"Goodnight, Sleep Fright"	Kyle Dooley	September 22, 2020	119	0.42
19	"Ollie in the House"	Christine Mitchell	September 23, 2020	120	0.33
19	"The Ollie Files"	Mike Girard	September 23, 2020	120	0.33
20	"Sour Power"	Ben Joseph	September 24, 2020	121	0.48
20	"Birthday Shmirthday: A Cleo Badette Documentary"	Jeff Sager	September 24, 2020	121	0.48
21	"Nightmare Frightscare!"	Etan Muskat	October 17, 2020	112	0.64
22	"Separation Anxiety"	Joel Buxton	December 14, 2020	122	0.42
22	"The Take Over"	Daniel Bryan Franklin	December 14, 2020	122	0.42
23	"Release the Hound"	Charles Johnston	December 15, 2020	123	0.60
23	"Cube is the Loneliest Number"	John Hazlett	December 15, 2020	123	0.60
Nicktoons
24	"Sick Day"	Mike Girard	May 3, 2021	TBA	N/A
25	"Unblocking Bernie"	Christine Mitchell	May 4, 2021	124	N/A
25	"Photo Finished"	Shawn Kalb	May 4, 2021	124	N/A
26	"Time Warped"	Jeff Sager	May 5, 2021	125	N/A
26	"Inspector Ollie Allen"	Lienne Sawatsky & Dan Williams	May 5, 2021	125	N/A
27	"Back to the Pack"	Christine Mitchell & John Hazlett	May 6, 2021	TBA	N/A
27	"Back to the Pack"	Lienne Sawatsky & Dan Williams	May 6, 2021	TBA	N/A

== Broadcast ==
In Canada, the series premiered on YTV on September 5, 2020.

== Ratings ==
Viewership and ratings per season of Ollie's Pack
Season	Episodes	First aired		Last aired		Avg. viewers (millions)
Season	Episodes	Date	Viewers (millions)	Date	Viewers (millions)	Avg. viewers (millions)
1	23	April 6, 2020	0.55	May 6, 2021	TBD	0.50

== Awards and nominations ==
In 2021, Corus received a Canadian Screen Award nomination for the show.
