= Hotel Transylvania: The Series =

Animated comedy television series

- Genre: Comedy horror
- Based on: Hotel Transylvania by; Todd Durham; Sony Pictures Animation
- Developed by: Mark Steinberg
- Directed by: Robin Budd
- Voices of: Bryn McAuley; Evany Rosen; Gage Munroe; Joseph Motiki; Dan Chameroy; David Berni; Ivan Sherry
- Theme music composer: Stephen Skratt; Asher Lenz
- Composers: Stephen Skratt; Asher Lenz
- Countries of origin: Canada; United States
- Original language: English
- No. of seasons: 2
- No. of episodes: 52 (97 segments) (list of episodes)

Production
- Executive producers: Rick Mischel; Scott Dyer; Irene Weibel
- Producers: Jane Crawford (season 1); Suzie Gallo (season 2); Rachel Bepple (season 2); Jeff Ramsden (season 2)
- Running time: 22 minutes (11 minutes per segment)
- Production companies: Sony Pictures Animation; Nelvana; Corus Entertainment

Original release
- Network: Disney Channel (U.S.); Teletoon (Canada)
- Release: June 25, 2017 – October 29, 2020

Hotel Transylvania: The Series is an animated comedy television series produced by Sony Pictures Animation and Nelvana in association with Corus Entertainment. It is based on and serves as a prequel to the film Hotel Transylvania (2012), taking place before the events of the first film, focusing on the activities of 114/115-year-old Mavis and her best friends at the Hotel Transylvania while Dracula is away at the Vampire Council.

The 26-episode first season premiered on June 25, 2017, on Disney Channel in the United States, with the first episode released earlier on June 20, 2017, on the WATCH Disney Channel app, YouTube, and VOD. The last eight episodes of the first season were first streamed onto Netflix in the United States on June 25, 2018, prior to their television air dates. In Canada, the series premiered on October 2, 2017, on Teletoon.

On September 12, 2018, a second season was announced. The second and final season premiered on October 8, 2019 and ran through October 29, 2020.

== Premise ==
The series takes place four years before the events of the original CGI film and follows Mavis and her best friends as they have fun adventures at the hotel while Dracula is away on business with the Vampire Council.

== Characters ==
=== Main ===
- Mavis Dracula (voiced by Bryn McAuley) is the carefree 114-year-old daughter of the late Martha and Dracula, who wants to have fun with her best friends. Her boundless curiosity and carefree spirit frequently leads her into trouble with her aunt Lydia. She turns 115 in the Season 1 finale "Fangceañera" and earns her own family cape. She is a lot paler than in the movies, where she was originally voiced by Selena Gomez.
- Wendy Blob (voiced by Evany Rosen) is a green blob of goo that is the daughter of Blobby and is one of Mavis' friends.
- Hank N. Stein (voiced by Gage Munroe) is the teenaged son of Frankenstein and Eunice and is one of Mavis' best friends. In "Thumb and Thumber", it is revealed that he has Dracula ancestry, making him and Mavis paternal distant cousins.
- Pedro (voiced by Joseph Motiki) is a fat teenage mummy who resembles Murray and is one of Mavis' friends. Pedro enjoys eating, sleeping, and rapping. His hero is the Sandman. He finally learns how to lay curses properly in "Purse of the Mummy".
- Aunt Lydia Dracula (voiced by Dan Chameroy) is Dracula's older sister, the late Martha's sister-in-law, and Mavis' paternal aunt, who pushes more order and tradition at the hotel when Mavis and her friends want to have any kind of fun. Her true name is revealed in "The Naming of the Shrew".
- Diane (voiced by Richard Binsley) is Aunt Lydia's pet chicken who used to be a human woman. She acts as Lydia's eyes and ears throughout the hotel. She is never seen in her mortal form nor is it acknowledged what she looked like.

=== Recurring ===
- Count "Drac" Dracula (voiced by David Berni in season one and Ivan Sherry in season two) is Mavis' widowed overprotective father and is away on "official vampire business" at the Vampire Council. He is replaced by his elder sister Lydia as the head staff of the hotel until his return. His cape is tinted purple instead of blood-red. In the series finale "What Lycidias Beneath", he decides to stay at the Hotel for good as he senses there are more dangers in the Underworld. He was originally voiced by Adam Sandler in the film.
- Frank N. Stein (voiced by Paul Braunstein) is the father of Hank N. Stein and husband of Eunice. He was originally voiced by Kevin James in the film.
- Eunice is the mother of Hank N. Stein and wife of Frank.
- Quasimodo (voiced by Scott McCord) is Hotel Transylvania's residential chef. He was originally voiced by Jon Lovitz in the film.
- Uncle Gene Dracula (voiced by Patrick McKenna) is Mavis' great-uncle and Dracula and Lydia's uncle who enjoys playing video games. He stays in a chariot-like wheelchair.
- Dr. John Gillman is a gill-man who is Hotel Transylvania's residential physician.
- Donald (voiced by Ryan Belleville) and Kitty Cartwright (voiced by Linda Kash) are a couple of humans who live with their toddler daughter near Hotel Transylvania. Donald is the fun and dim-witted father and Kitty is the overprotective mother who does anything to keep monsters away from her house, including installing the house with a high tech security system.
- Cerberus is a three-headed guard dog that mostly resides in Hotel Transylvania's Cerberus Pit.
- Klaus (voiced by Carter Hayden) is Mavis' first cousin who is always trying to beat and best her in everything else except turning into a bat, a natural ability he finally develops in "Drop the Needle". His name is pronounced "Klow-shh." He is least liked by his uncle and other vampires who consider him annoying and dim-witted.
- Tiffany (voiced by Linda Kash) is a witch who is friends with Mavis and runs the spa at Hotel Transylvania. She loves helping out and gossip and she is often chewing and blowing bubbles with gum.

=== Supporting ===
- Countess Martha was Count Dracula's beloved wife who was a vampire as well. She does not actually appear, having been killed by an angry mob a century before the events of the show and movies, but is referenced in "Fangceañera" when her husband gives Mavis her blood-red gown as a one hundred-and-fifteenth birthday present.

== Production ==
Hotel Transylvania: The Series' voice cast is based in Toronto, Ontario, Canada, with the Dayton/Walters casting agency being responsible for the casting. None of the original cast returned for the show.

== Episodes ==
Season	Segments	Episodes	Originally released	
Season	Segments	Episodes	First released	Last released
Shorts	N/A	4	June 9, 2017	June 24, 2017
1	48	26	June 25, 2017	October 25, 2018
2	49	26	October 8, 2019	October 29, 2020

== Development ==
The series was announced in July 2015 as a co-production between Sony Pictures Animation and Nelvana, for which the series would premiere in 2017. Distribution rights were shared between Sony Pictures and Corus Entertainment, with Sony Pictures Television handling the United States and Nelvana Enterprises for all other territories alongside select consumer product rights. Sony Pictures Animation would handle global consumer product rights for toys, games and publishing.

In September 2018, the series was renewed for a second season.

== Broadcast ==
On June 20, 2016, Sony Pictures Animation and Nelvana announced a global broadcast and on-demand deal with Disney Channels Worldwide, where the series would air on a respective Disney Channel network in Africa, Asia, Australia and New Zealand, Europe, Latin America, the Middle East, and the United States. It was also announced that Corus Entertainment, Nelvana's parent company, would air the series on their version of Disney Channel and its French counterpart La Chaîne Disney. The Disney deal excluded Germany, where Nelvana instead pre-sold the series to Super RTL in November.

While planned to premiere on Disney Channel in Canada, the series would instead premiere on sister channel Teletoon in October 2017. In India, the series premiered on December 18, 2017, on Disney Channel India. Repeats of the series started airing on Disney XD in the United States as of October 2019. The last eight episodes of the first season were shown on Netflix in the United States on June 25, 2018, a year after the show premiered.
