= List of programs broadcast by YTV =

This is a list of television programs currently and formerly broadcast by YTV in Canada.

== Current programming ==
As of November 2026:

=== Original programming ===
==== Live-action series ====
| Title | Premiere date | Current season | Source(s) |
|---|---|---|---|
| Popularity Papers | April 10, 2023 | 1 | |

==== Animated series ====
| Title | Premiere date | Current season | Source(s) |
|---|---|---|---|
| Mermicorno: Starfall | February 3, 2025 | 1 | |
| Piñata Smashlings | March 10, 2025 | 1 | |
| Zokie of Planet Ruby | January 5, 2026 | 1 | |

==== Short series ====
| Title | Premiere date | Current season | Source(s) |
|---|---|---|---|
| Piñata Smashlings Shorts | 2024 | reruns | |

=== Acquired from Skydance Corporation ===
| Title | Premiere date | Current season | Source(s) |
|---|---|---|---|
| Teen Titans Go! | June 2, 2025 | 9 | |
| Regular Show: The Lost Tapes | May 11, 2026 | 1 | |

=== Acquired from Hulu ===
| Title | Premiere date | Current season | Source(s) |
|---|---|---|---|
| The Wonderfully Weird World of Gumball | October 6, 2025 | 2 | |

=== Other acquired programming ===
==== Animated series ====
| Title | Premiere date | Current season | Source(s) |
|---|---|---|---|
| Pokémon | 1998–2014; 2025–present | 26 | |

==== Live-action series ====
| Title | Premiere date | Current season | Source(s) |
|---|---|---|---|
| Pick a Puppy | 2025 | Reruns | |

=== Repeats of ended programming ===
==== Animated series ====
| Title | Premiere date | Finale date | Date(s) rerun | Note(s) |
|---|---|---|---|---|
| Best & Bester | September 18, 2022 | January 29, 2023 | 2023–present | |
| Cloudy with a Chance of Meatballs | February 20, 2017 | June 30, 2018 | June 9, 2019–present | (Note: Also airs on Nickelodeon) |
| Ollie's Pack | September 5, 2020 | 2021 | 2021–2022, 2024–present | |

==== Live-action series ====
| Title | Premiere date | Finale date | Date(s) rerun | Note(s) |
|---|---|---|---|---|
| Driving Me Crazy | September 10, 2016 | November 14, 2016 | 2016–2019; 2022–present | |
| Make It Pop | March 26, 2015 | August 20, 2016 | 2020, 2021, 2022–present | |
| Undercover High | 2014 | 2015 | 2017–2020; 2022; 2024–present | (Note: Also airs on Disney Channel) |

== Former programming ==
=== Original programming ===
==== Live-action series ====
===== Comedy series =====
| Title | Premiere date | Finale date | Date(s) rerun | Note(s) |
|---|---|---|---|---|
| Big Teeth, Bad Breath | September 20, 2001 | May 2, 2002 | 2002–2004 | |
| Breaker High | September 15, 1997 | March 30, 1998 | 1998–2004 | |
| Dog House | October 10, 1990 | 1991 | 1991–1996 | |
| Family Biz | April 6, 2009 | December 8, 2009 | 2009–2010 | |
| Fries with That? | April 4, 2004 | December 18, 2004 | 2004–2010 | |
| How to Be Indie | October 2, 2009 | October 24, 2011 | —N/a | |
| I Was a Sixth Grade Alien | July 13, 1999 | January 10, 2001 | 2001–2002 | |
| Life with Boys | September 9, 2011 | August 27, 2013 | 2013–2015 | |
| Maniac Mansion | September 14, 1990 | April 4, 1993 | 1993–1995; 1997 | |
| Max & Shred | October 6, 2014 | March 31, 2016 | 2019; 2021–2024 | |
| Mental Block | September 1, 2003 | May 11, 2004 | 2004–2005 | |
| Mr. Young | March 1, 2011 | November 28, 2013 | 2013–2014 | |
| The New Addams Family | October 19, 1998 | August 28, 1999 | 1999–2004 | |
| Radio Active | September 12, 1998 | March 17, 2001 | 2001–2005 | |
| Seriously Weird | 2002 | | 2002–2003 | |
| Some Assembly Required | January 6, 2014 | June 6, 2016 | 2016–2019; 2020–2021 | |
| The Stanley Dynamic | March 19, 2015 | April 20, 2016 | 2016–2019; 2022–2023 | |
| Star Falls | March 31, 2018 | September 2, 2018 | 2021–2024 | |
| Student Bodies | 1997 | 2000 | 2000–2003 | |
| System Crash | March 14, 1999 | December 9, 2001 | 2001–2005 | |
| That's So Weird! | September 9, 2009 | March 8, 2012 | —N/a | |

===== Drama series =====
| Title | Premiere date | Finale date | Date(s) rerun | Note(s) |
|---|---|---|---|---|
| 15/Love | September 6, 2004 | October 16, 2006 | 2006–2007 | |
| The Adventures of the Black Stallion | September 15, 1990 | May 16, 1993 | 1993–1994 | |
| Catwalk | October 1, 1992 | January 1, 1994 | 1994–1998 | |
| Dark Oracle | October 2, 2004 | June 1, 2006 | 2006–2008 | |
| Jean Mercier's My Hometown | 1996 | 1998 | —N/a | |
| My Brand New Life | 2004 | | —N/a | |
| Open Heart | January 20, 2015 | March 31, 2015 | 2015–2016 | |
| Ride | September 5, 2016 | February 24, 2017 | 2017–2018 | |
| The Saddle Club | April 30, 2001 | June 4, 2003 | —N/a | |
| Vampire High | September 15, 2001 | May 4, 2002 | 2002–2005 | |

===== Fantasy series =====
| Title | Premiere date | Finale date | Date(s) rerun | Note(s) |
|---|---|---|---|---|
| Are You Afraid of the Dark? | August 15, 1992 | April 20, 1996 | 1996–1999; 2019; 2021 | |
| Big Wolf on Campus | April 2, 1999 | April 7, 2002 | 2002–2004 | |
| Goosebumps | October 27, 1995 | November 16, 1998 | 1998–2004; 2016–2017 | |
| Guinevere Jones | May 4, 2002 | December 7, 2002 | 2003–2005 | |
| ReBoot: The Guardian Code | June 4, 2018 | July 5, 2018 | 2020–2022 | |

===== Reality series =====
| Title | Premiere date | Finale date | Date(s) rerun | Note(s) |
|---|---|---|---|---|
| The Adrenaline Project | September 29, 2007 | April 21, 2009 | 2009–2010 | |
| Extreme Babysitting | January 5, 2013 | February 24, 2014 | 2014 | |
| Gamerz | 1999 | 2004 | —N/a | |
| Hit List | June 6, 1991 | July 3, 2005 | 2005–2006 | |
| In Real Life | March 4, 2009 | December 12, 2011 | 2011–2012 | |
| Kid Food Nation: The Show | November 23, 2020 | 2022 | 2024–2025 | |
| Made Up | 2016 | 2017 | 2020–2021; 2022 | |
| The Next Star | July 18, 2008 | September 21, 2014 | —N/a | |
| Prank Patrol | September 6, 2005 | February 26, 2010 | 2010–2011; 2013 | |
| Survive This | April 7, 2009 | July 12, 2010 | 2010–2011 | |
| Tricked | September 5, 2016 | October 6, 2016 | 2019–2020 | |

===== Game shows =====
| Title | Premiere date | Finale date | Date(s) rerun | Note(s) |
|---|---|---|---|---|
| Cache Craze | March 9, 2013 | August 24, 2014 | 2014–2015 | |
| Clips | 1992 | 1996 | —N/a | |
| Cook'd | 2014 | | —N/a | |
| Don't Lick the Pig | 2002 | | —N/a | |
| Game Gurus | 2006 | 2007 | —N/a | |
| Game On | May 4, 2015 | May 27, 2016 | 2016–2019 | |
| Japanizi: Going, Going, Gong! | November 5, 2013 | August 20, 2014 | 2016 | |
| Splatalot! | March 11, 2011 | August 29, 2013 | 2016 | |
| Surprise! It's Edible Incredible! | 2007 | 2013 | 2016–2017; 2020 | |
| Uh Oh! | August 22, 1997 | April 19, 2003 | 2003–2004 | |
| Video & Arcade Top 10 | 1991 | 2006 | —N/a | |
| Zoink'd | 2012 | 2014 | 2016 | |

===== Mystery series =====
| Title | Premiere date | Finale date | Date(s) rerun | Note(s) |
|---|---|---|---|---|
| The Adventures of Shirley Holmes | May 7, 1996 | May 7, 2000 | 2000–2001 | |
| Daring & Grace: Teen Detectives | 1999 | | —N/a | |
| The Hardy Boys | March 5, 2021 | 2023 | 2023–2025 | |
| Mystery Hunters | September 9, 2002 | February 15, 2009 | 2009–2010 | |
| Screech Owls | January 1, 2001 | February 1, 2002 | —N/a | |

===== Science fiction series =====
| Title | Premiere date | Finale date | Date(s) rerun | Note(s) |
|---|---|---|---|---|
| 2030 CE | February 6, 2002 | April 3, 2003 | 2003–2004 | |
| Galidor: Defenders of the Outer Dimension | February 9, 2002 | August 24, 2002 | 2002–2003 | |
| Monster Warriors | March 18, 2006 | July 26, 2008 | 2008–2009 | |
| Timeblazers | July 5, 2003 | July 9, 2005 | 2005–2006 | |
| The Zack Files | September 17, 2000 | May 5, 2002 | 2002–2003 | |
| Zixx | March 15, 2004 | September 14, 2009 | 2009–2010 | |

===== Variety series =====
| Title | Premiere date | Finale date | Date(s) rerun | Note(s) |
|---|---|---|---|---|
| The Anti-Gravity Room | 1995 | 1997 | 1995–2002 | |
| It's Alive! | May 14, 1994 | August 10, 1996 | 1996 | |
| Oliver's Twist | 1991 | 1994 | —N/a | |
| Rock 'n Talk | September 3, 1990 | February 27, 1993 | —N/a | |
| The Ron Oliver Show | 1990 | 1991 | —N/a | |
| Squawk Box | September 1994 | 1994 | —N/a | |
| YTV Hits | 1988 | 1990 | —N/a | |
| YTV News | 1993 | 1998 | —N/a | |
| YTV Rec Room | 1989 | 1990 | —N/a | |
| YTV Rocks | 1988 | 1990 | —N/a | |
| YTV's Young Canada | 1991 | 1993 | —N/a | |

==== Animated series ====
| Title | Premiere date | Finale date | Date(s) rerun | Note(s) |
|---|---|---|---|---|
| 3 Amigonauts | August 5, 2017 | September 28, 2017 | 2017; 2024–2025 | |
| The Adventures of Sam & Max: Freelance Police | October 4, 1997 | April 25, 1998 | 1998–1999 | |
| Almost Naked Animals | January 7, 2011 | May 22, 2013 | 2013–2017 | |
| The Amazing Adrenalini Brothers | May 7, 2006 | 2008 | —N/a | |
| Beast Machines: Transformers | September 18, 1999 | November 18, 2000 | 2003 | |
| Beasties: Transformers | September 16, 1996 | March 7, 1999 | 1999–2000; 2002; 2004–2006 | |
| Being Ian | April 26, 2005 | October 11, 2008 | 2008–2013 | |
| The Boy | January 1, 2004 | September 5, 2005 | 2005–2006 | |
| Brady's Beasts | March 25, 2005 | December 31, 2006 | 2006–2007 | |
| Captain Flamingo | February 7, 2006 | December 19, 2010 | 2014 | |
| Chuck's Choice | May 6, 2017 | June 9, 2017 | 2017–2020, 2023–2024 | |
| Clang Invasion | September 18, 2007 | July 17, 2008 | 2009–2011; 2014 | |
| Edgar & Ellen | October 7, 2007 | October 30, 2008 | 2008–2009 | |
| Erky Perky | September 7, 2006 | September 7, 2009 | 2009–2012 | |
| Freaky Stories | October 24, 1997 | October 1, 2000 | 2000–2005 | |
| Funpak | February 3, 2005 | May 5, 2005 | —N/a | |
| Girlstuff/Boystuff | November 4, 2002 | February 6, 2003 | 2003–2005 | |
| Go Away, Unicorn! | September 7, 2018 | June 8, 2019 | June 9, 2019–2023 | |
| Grossology | September 29, 2006 | October 24, 2009 | 2009–2011, 2016 | (Note: Also airs on Disney XD) |
| If the World Were a Village | December 11, 2005 | | —N/a | (Note: One-off special commissioned for YTV for Unicef's International Day for Children's Broadcasting) |
| Jacob Two-Two | April 4, 2003 | May 19, 2006 | 2006–2009 | |
| Jane and the Dragon | October 15, 2005 | August 12, 2006 | 2006–2009 | |
| Jibber Jabber | September 3, 2007 | December 7. 2007 | 2007–2009 | |
| Kid vs. Kat | October 25, 2008 | June 4, 2011 | 2011–2016 | |
| League of Super Evil | March 7, 2009 | August 25, 2012 | 2012–2014; 2016 | |
| Martin Mystery | October 1, 2003 | March 27, 2006 | 2006–2009 | |
| Mischief City | January 4, 2005 | December 22, 2005 | 2005–2007 | |
| Mona the Vampire | September 13, 1999 | February 22, 2006 | 2006–2007 | |
| Monster Buster Club | October 29, 2007 | November 14, 2009 | 2009–2015 | |
| Monster by Mistake | October 26, 1996 | March 23, 2003 | 2003–2007 | |
| Moville Mysteries | September 7, 2002 | May 14, 2003 | 2003–2004 | |
| Mysticons | August 28, 2017 | September 15, 2018 | 2018–2019 | |
| Nerds and Monsters | March 12, 2014 | August 27, 2016 | September 2020, 2021–2023 | |
| Numb Chucks | January 7, 2014 | December 1, 2016 | 2019, 2021–2024 | |
| Oh No! It's an Alien Invasion | August 3, 2013 | December 8, 2014 | 2014–2015 | (Note: Moved to Teletoon for season 2) |
| Pearlie | September 19, 2009 | January 31, 2011 | 2011 | |
| Ralf the Record Rat | 2004 | | —N/a | |
| Rated A for Awesome | September 3, 2011 | February 25, 2012 | 2012–2016 | |
| ReBoot | September 7, 1994 | November 30, 2001 | 2001–2006 | |
| Redakai: Conquer the Kairu | July 9, 2011 | December 23, 2013 | —N/a | |
| RollBots | February 7, 2009 | November 24, 2009 | 2009–2011 | |
| Ruby Gloom | October 15, 2006 | June 1, 2008 | 2008–2010 | (Note: Also airs on Boomerang) |
| Scaredy Squirrel | April 1, 2011 | August 17, 2013 | 2013–2016, 2021–2026 | (Note: Also airs on Boomerang and Disney XD) |
| Shadow Raiders | September 16, 1998 | June 23, 1999 | 1999–2002; 2006–2008 | |
| Short Circutz | September 10, 1994 | September 1, 1996 | 1996–1997 | |
| Sidekick | September 3, 2010 | September 14, 2013 | 2013–2016, 2021–2023 | |
| Stickin' Around | August 14, 1996 | April 13, 1998 | 1998–2007 | |
| Storm Hawks | September 8, 2007 | April 6, 2009 | 2009–2010 | |
| Super Wish | June 4, 2022 | 2023 | 2023–2025 | |
| Team Galaxy | August 28, 2006 | 2007 | 2007–2010; 2013 | |
| Three Delivery | June 27, 2008 | June 28, 2009 | 2010–2011 | |
| Treasure | September 13, 2000 | December 17, 2001 | 2001–2002 | |
| Ultimate Book of Spells | September 12, 2001 | April 7, 2002 | 2002–2003 | |
| Urban Vermin | October 8, 2007 | August 30, 2008 | —N/a | |
| Viva Piñata | August 26, 2006 | May 18, 2009 | 2009–2011 | |
| Watership Down | September 28, 1999 | December 4, 2001 | 2001–2003 | |
| Weird-Oh's | September 15, 1999 | February 6, 2002 | —N/a | |
| Weird Years | November 6, 2006 | June 11, 2007 | 2007–2008 | |
| Xcalibur | September 1, 2001 | April 1, 2002 | 2002–2003 | |
| Yvon of the Yukon | April 28, 2001 | January 24, 2004 | 2004–2007 | |
| Zeke's Pad | January 9, 2010 | TBA | 2010–2011 | |
| The ZhuZhus | July 4, 2017 | August 22, 2017 | 2017–2018 | (Note: Also airs on Disney Channel and Disney Junior) |

==== Preschool series ====
===== Live-action series =====
| Title | Premiere date | Finale date | Date(s) rerun | Note(s) |
|---|---|---|---|---|
| The Adventures of Dudley the Dragon | 1995 | 1997 | 1997–2002 | |
| The Big Comfy Couch | March 2, 1993 | August 31, 1996 | 1996–1999 | |
| The Bittles | June 2002 | August 2003 | —N/a | |
| The Fuzzpaws | 1998 | 1999 | 1999–2001 | |
| Groundling Marsh | June 27, 1994 | November 28, 1997 | 1997–2002 | |
| Judy & David's Boombox | 1999 | 2002 | | |
| Panda Bear Daycare | 1998 | 1999 | 1999–2001 | |
| PJ Katie's Farm | 1995 | 1999 | —N/a | |
| Ruffus the Dog | 1998 | 1999 | 1999–2001 | |
| Shining Time Station | September 13, 1991 | 1993 | 1993–1999 | |

===== Animated series =====
| Title | Premiere date | Finale date | Date(s) rerun | Note(s) |
|---|---|---|---|---|
| Anthony Ant | February 1, 1999 | April 18, 1999 | 1999–2002 | |
| Babar and the Adventures of Badou | November 22, 2010 | May 30, 2011 | —N/a | (Note: Later moved to Treehouse TV) |
| George and Martha | April 1, 1999 | May 1, 2000 | 2000–2003 | |
| Rupert | September 7, 1991 | June 19, 1997 | 1997–2000; 2003–2006 | |
| Will and Dewitt | September 22, 2007 | May 3, 2008 | 2008–2009 | |
| Willa's Wild Life | October 4, 2008 | February 6, 2009 | 2009–2010 | |

==== Short series ====
| Title | Date(s) aired | Note(s) |
|---|---|---|
| Chip'n Orbit | 2001–2006, 2007 | |
| Go Away, Unicorn! Shorts | 2019 | |
| Little Big Kid | 1998–2000, 2001–2003, 2004 | |
| My Special Book | 1998–2000 | |
| Nanalan' | 1998–2004 | |
| Pet Squad | 1998–2000 | |
| Stickin' Around | 1994–2007 | |

=== Acquired from Nickelodeon (U.S.) ===
==== Live-action series ====
| Title | Premiere date | Finale date | Note(s) |
|---|---|---|---|
| 100 Things to Do Before High School | 2015 | 2016 | |
| All That | 2019 | 2021 | |
| America's Most Musical Family | 2019 | 2020 | |
| Animorphs | 1998 | 2000 | |
| Are You Smarter Than a 5th Grader? | 2019 | | |
| The Astronauts | 2020 | 2021 | |
| The Barbarian and the Troll | 2021 | | |
| Bella and the Bulldogs | 2015 | 2016 | |
| Big Time Rush | 2010 | 2014 | |
| Big Time Rush | 2020 | | |
| Big Time Rush | 2021 | | |
| The Brothers García | 2001 | 2003 | |
| Cousins for Life | 2019 | | |
| Dance on Sunset | 2008 | 2009 | |
| Danger Force | 2020 | 2025 | |
| Double Dare | 2018 | 2020 | |
| Drake & Josh | 2004 | 2010 | |
| Drake & Josh | 2019 | | |
| Drama Club | 2021 | | |
| Every Witch Way | 2014 | 2015 | |
| Game Shakers | 2015 | 2019 | |
| Game Shakers | 2020 | | |
| Game Shakers | 2021 | 2022 | |
| The Haunted Hathaways | 2013 | 2015 | |
| The Haunted Hathaways | 2021 | | |
| Henry Danger | 2014 | 2022 | |
| Hillside | 1992 | 1993 | |
| House of Anubis | 2011 | 2013 | |
| How to Rock | 2012 | 2013 | |
| Hunter Street | 2017 | 2020 | |
| Hunter Street | 2021 | | |
| I Am Frankie | 2017 | 2018 | |
| iCarly | 2007 | 2012 | |
| iCarly | 2019 | 2020 | |
| iCarly | 2021 | 2022 | |
| Just Jordan | 2007 | 2008 | |
| Knight Squad | 2018 | 2019 | |
| Lip Sync Battle Shorties | 2019 | 2020 | |
| Marvin Marvin | 2013 | | |
| The Naked Brothers Band | 2007 | 2009 | |
| Nick Arcade | 1992 | 1993 | |
| The Nick Cannon Show | 2003 | 2004 | |
| The Nick Cannon Show | 2007 | | |
| Nickelodeon Guts | 1994 | 1995 | |
| Nickelodeon's Unfiltered | 2020 | 2021 | |
| Nicky, Ricky, Dicky & Dawn | 2014 | 2019 | |
| Nicky, Ricky, Dicky & Dawn | 2020 | | |
| Nicky, Ricky, Dicky & Dawn | 2021 | 2022 | |
| The Really Loud House | 2022 | 2025 | |
| Romeo! | 2004 | 2005 | |
| Roundhouse | 1993 | 1994 | |
| Sam & Cat | 2013 | 2014 | |
| Sam & Cat | 2020 | 2022 | |
| School of Rock | 2016 | 2018 | |
| School of Rock | 2021 | | |
| The Secret World of Alex Mack | 1995 | 1998 | |
| Side Hustle | 2020 | 2022 | |
| The Substitute | 2020 | 2021 | |
| Talia in the Kitchen | 2015 | 2016 | |
| The Thundermans | 2013 | 2019 | |
| The Thundermans | 2020 | | |
| The Thundermans | 2021 | 2022 | |
| Tooned In | 2021 | 2022 | |
| True Jackson, VP | 2009 | 2011 | |
| True Jackson, VP | 2020 | 2021 | |
| Tyler Perry's Young Dylan | 2020 | 2025 | |
| Unfabulous | 2005 | 2008 | |
| Unleashed | 2020 | | |
| Victorious | 2010 | 2013 | |
| Victorious | 2020 | 2022 | |
| Warped! | 2022 | | |
| Wendell & Vinnie | 2013 | | |
| Wild & Crazy Kids | 1990 | 1993 | |

==== Animated series ("Nicktoons") ====
| Title | Premiere date | Finale date | Note(s) |
|---|---|---|---|
| Aaahh!!! Real Monsters | 1997 | 1999 | |
| The Adventures of Jimmy Neutron, Boy Genius | 2003 | 2010 | |
| The Adventures of Kid Danger | 2018 | | |
| All Grown Up! | 2003 | 2008 | |
| The Angry Beavers | 1997 | 2003 | |
| As Told by Ginger | 2001 | 2004 | |
| Avatar: The Last Airbender | 2005 | 2008 | |
| Avatar: The Last Airbender | 2020 | 2021 | |
| Back at the Barnyard | 2008 | 2011 | |
| Breadwinners | 2014 | 2015 | |
| Bunsen Is a Beast | 2017 | 2018 | |
| The Casagrandes | 2019 | 2024 | |
| CatDog | 1999 | 2002 | |
| Catscratch | 2005 | 2007 | |
| ChalkZone | 2003 | 2007 | |
| Danny Phantom | 2004 | 2008 | |
| Doug | 1995 | 1999 | |
| El Tigre: The Adventures of Manny Rivera | 2007 | 2008 | |
| The Fairly OddParents (Note: Seasons 1-5 are distributed in Canada by Nelvana) | 2002 | 2017 | |
| Fanboy & Chum Chum | 2009 | 2011 | |
| Harvey Beaks | 2015 | 2017 | |
| Hey Arnold! | 1997 | 2005 | |
| Invader Zim | 2006 | 2008 | |
| It's Pony | 2020 | 2022 | |
| KaBlam! | 1998 | 2002 | |
| Kung Fu Panda: Legends of Awesomeness | 2011 | 2016 | |
| The Legend of Korra | 2012 | 2014 | |
| The Legend of Korra | 2020 | 2021 | |
| The Loud House | 2016 | 2025 | |
| Max & the Midknights | 2024 | 2025 | |
| Middlemost Post | 2021 | 2022 | |
| The Mighty B! | 2008 | 2011 | |
| Monster High | 2022 | 2025 | |
| Monsters vs. Aliens | 2013 | 2014 | |
| My Life as a Teenage Robot | 2003 | 2007 | |
| The Patrick Star Show | 2021 | 2025 | |
| The Penguins of Madagascar | 2009 | 2012 | 2015-2017 |
| Pig Goat Banana Cricket | 2015 | 2017 | |
| Rise of the Teenage Mutant Ninja Turtles | 2018 | 2020 | |
| Rock Paper Scissors | 2024 | 2025 | |
| Rocket Power | 2000 | 2004 | |
| Rocko's Modern Life | 1994 | 2000 | |
| Rugrats (1991) | 1994 | 2004 | |
| Sanjay and Craig | 2013 | 2015 | |
| SpongeBob SquarePants | 1999 | 2025 | |
| T.U.F.F. Puppy | 2010 | 2015 | |
| Tak and the Power of Juju | 2008 | | |
| Teenage Mutant Ninja Turtles (2012 TV series) | 2012 | 2017 | |
| Welcome to the Wayne | 2017 | 2019 | |
| The Wild Thornberrys | 2001 | 2003 | |
| Winx Club (Nickelodeon revival) | 2012 | 2015 | |
| The X's | 2006 | 2007 | |

==== Preschool series ====
| Title | Started | Ended | Note(s) |
|---|---|---|---|
| Blue's Clues | 1998 | 1999 | |
| Dora the Explorer | 2001 | 2004 | |
| Oswald | 2002 | | |

==== Mini-series/specials ====
| Title | Started | Ended | Note(s) |
|---|---|---|---|
| Nickelodeon Kids' Choice Awards | 2007 | 2025 | |

=== Acquired from Paramount+ ===
==== Animated series ("Nicktoons") ====
| Title | Premiere date | Finale date | Note(s) |
|---|---|---|---|
| Big Nate | September 2, 2023 | August 26, 2024 | |
| Rugrats (2021) | March 4, 2022 | 2024 | |
| Kamp Koral: SpongeBob's Under Years | October 3, 2021 | 2025 | |
| Transformers: EarthSpark | February 24, 2023 | 2025 | |

=== Acquired from Skydance Corportation ===
==== Live-action series ====
| Title | Date(s) aired | Note(s) |
|---|---|---|
| The Fresh Prince of Bel-Air | 2005–2008 | |
| Full House | 2003–2006 | |
| Gilmore Girls | 2006–2008 | |
| The Middle | 2016; 2020 | |
| Shazam! | 1988 | |
| Smallville | 2005–2010 | |
| Suburgatory | 2016 | |
| What I Like About You | 2010 | |

==== Animated series ====
| Title | Date(s) aired | Note(s) |
|---|---|---|
| Æon Flux | 1996–1997 | |
| Animaniacs | 1998–2003 | |
| Animaniacs (2020) | November 21, 2020 | |
| Batman: The Animated Series | 1999–2001 | |
| Batman Beyond | 1999–2005 | |
| Daria | 1998–2002 | |
| Detention | 2000–2004 | |
| Dexter's Laboratory | 1996–2006 | |
| Downtown | 2000–2002 | |
| The Flintstones | 1994–2002 | |
| Freakazoid! | 1998 | |
| Gremlins | 2023–2025 | |
| Hi Hi Puffy AmiYumi | 2005–2007 | |
| Histeria! | 1999–2000 | |
| The Huckleberry Hound Show | 1999–2000 | |
| The Jetsons | 1996; 1998–2003 | |
| Josie and the Pussycats | 2001–2003 | |
| Justice League | 2002–2004 | |
| Justice League Unlimited | 2004–2006 | |
| Krypto the Superdog | 2005–2006 | |
| Legion of Super Heroes | 2007–2008 | |
| The Mask: Animated Series | 1996–1998 | |
| Pinky and the Brain | 1998–2000; 2002–2004; 2007–2009 | |
| Pinky, Elmyra & the Brain | 2000 | |
| The Powerpuff Girls | 1999–2005 | |
| The Real Adventures of Jonny Quest | 1996–1997 | |
| Samurai Jack | 2002–2005 | |
| Static Shock | 2001–2005 | |
| Super Friends | 2002–2005 | |
| Superman | 1995 | |
| Teen Titans | 2003–2007 | |
| Tiny Toon Adventures | 1997–2000 | |
| Waynehead | 1996–1998 | |
| Xiaolin Showdown | 2004–2007 | |
| The Yogi Bear Show | 1995–1997 | |
| The Zeta Project | 2001–2002 | |

=== Acquired from NBCUniversal ===
==== Live-action series ====
| Title | Date(s) aired | Note(s) |
|---|---|---|
| Friday Night Lights | 2011; 2014 | |
| Frogger | 2021 | |
| Fudge | 1995–1996 | |
| The New Leave It to Beaver | 1989–1992 | |
| Punky Brewster | 2021 | |
| Siwa Dance Pop Revolution | 2021–2022 | |
| Top Chef Family Style | 2021–2024 | |
| Weird Science | 1995 | |
| Young Hercules | 1998–1999 | |

==== Animated series ====
| Title | Date(s) aired | Note(s) |
|---|---|---|
| Archibald's Next Big Thing Is Here! | 2021–2022 | |
| The Croods: Family Tree | 2021–2025 | |
| DreamWorks Dragons: The Nine Realms | 2021–2025 | |
| Earthworm Jim | 1995–1997 | |
| Fright Krewe | 2023–2025 | |
| Jurassic World Camp Cretaceous | 2022–2025 | |
| The Land Before Time | 2007–2008 | |
| Megamind Rules! | 2024–2025 | |
| The Mighty Ones | 2021–2024 | |
| The Mummy: The Animated Series | 2001–2003 | |
| The New Woody Woodpecker Show | 1999–2005 | |
| Sitting Ducks | 2001–2003 | |
| Trolls: TrollsTopia | 2020–2025 | |
| The Woody Woodpecker Show | 1994–2000 | |

=== Other acquired programming ===
==== Live-action series ====
- 2point4 Children (2002–04)
- 8 Simple Rules (2010–11; 2020)
- Adventures in Rainbow Country (1988–90)
- The Adventures of Black Beauty (1988–89)
- The Adventures of Robin Hood (1988–89)
- Al Oeming – Man of the North (1988–1990)
- America's Funniest Home Videos (2010–21)
- Andy Robson (1988–1989)
- Are You Being Served? (1994–2005)
- Arthur C. Clarke's Mysterious World (1988–1989)
- Audubon Wildlife Theatre (1988–91)
- Back to Sherwood (1999–2000)
- Bad Boyes (1989–90, 1992–93)
- Barriers (1988–89)
- Batman (1992–96)
- Beakman's World (1995–96)
- Big Bad Beetleborgs (1997)
- Bizarre (1994–95)
- Blake's 7 (1989–92)
- Bonanza (1988–93)
- Bottom (1996–98)
- Boy Dominic (1988–89)
- Boy Meets World (1998–2001)
- Bread (1989–93; 1995)
- Buffy the Vampire Slayer (1997–2003)
- Carnival Eats (2022)
- Carol Burnett and Friends (1988–93)
- Chef! (1996–97)
- The Chronicles of Narnia (1990–96)
- Circus (1988–93)
- The Cisco Kid (1992–96)
- Contact (1988–90)
- Dead Last (2001–03)
- Deepwater Black (1997–99)
- Degrassi: The Next Generation (2020–24)
- Deke Wilson's Mini-Mysteries (1990–94)
- Dennis the Menace (1959 TV series) (1992–94)
- Do It for Yourself (1992–1993)
- Doctor Who (1989–94)
- Don't Ask Me (1988)
- Dr. Fad (1988–91)
- Dracula: The Series (1994–95; 1997)
- The Edison Twins (1988–94)
- Eerie, Indiana (1996–97)
- Elephant Boy (1988–91)
- EMU-TV (1989–92)
- Endurance (2003–08)
- Escape from Scorpion Island (2010)
- Everybody Hates Chris (2010–11; 2023)
- Falcon Beach (2007–09)
- Fame (1990–94)
- Family Ties (1995–96)
- Farscape (1999–2001)
- Fear (2002–06)
- Five Times Dizzy (1988–89)
- The Flaxton Boys (1988–90)
- Flipper (1964 TV series) (1991–96)
- Flipper (1995 TV series) (1996–2000)
- Follyfoot (1988–1989)
- The Forest Rangers (1988–93)
- Free to Fly (1988–90)
- Frontier Doctor (1988–89)
- Geek Girl (October 7, 2024–2024)
- The Generation Gap (1990–92)
- Genius Junior (2018)
- George (1988–1990)
- Get Smart (1990–95)
- Ghost Trackers (2005–10)
- The Ghosts of Motley Hall (1988–90)
- Girlz TV (2003–07)
- Going Great (1988–90)
- Goldie's Oldies (July 2, 2021–2021)
- Gruey (1990–93)
- Harrigan (1988–90)
- The Haunting Hour: The Series (2014–17)
- Hey Vern, It's Ernest! (1995)
- The Hilarious House of Frightenstein (1989–92)
- The Hitchhiker's Guide to the Galaxy (1989)
- Hollywood's 10 Best (2005)
- Home and Away (1988–94)
- Home Improvement (2008–11)
- I Love Mummy (2002–03)
- Incredible Story Studios (1998–2003)
- The Intrepids (1994–96)
- Jep! (1998–99)
- The Judge (1989–91)
- Junior Chef Showdown (2021–25)
- Just for Laughs Gags (2012–17)
- Just Kidding (2014–2020) (Note: Moved from Teletoon)
- Just Like Mom (1988–91)
- The KangaZoo Club (1988–91)
- Karaoke Star Jr. (2009)
- Katts and Dog (1993–95)
- Keeping Up Appearances (1997–2003)
- Kevin Can Wait (2016–17)
- Kid's Corner (1988–1993)
- Kids Can Rock and Roll (1997–98)
- The Kids of Degrassi Street (1990–91; 1993–94)
- Kyle XY (2011–12)
- Lassie (1954 TV series) (1988–92)
- Lassie (1997 TV series) (1997–2000)
- Legend of the Hidden City (1996–98)
- Let's Go (1988–92)
- Life Unexpected (2010)
- Little House on the Prairie (1991–95)
- The Little Vampire (1991–93)
- The Littlest Hobo (1991–95)
- The Lone Ranger (1988–91; 1993)
- Lucy Sullivan Is Getting Married (2000–02)
- Madison (1995–98, 2006–07)
- Maid Marian and Her Merry Men (1990–93)
- Malcolm in the Middle (2006–10)
- Man with a Plan (2016–17)
- Max Glick (1994–96)
- Me & Max (1988–90)
- Me and My Girl (1990–91)
- Merlin (2017)
- Mr. Microchip (1988–89)
- The Muppet Show (1988–94)
- My Babysitter's a Vampire (2014–15)
- My Family (2001–07)
- My Favorite Martian (1988–91)
- My Wife and Kids (2013)
- NBA Inside Stuff (1994–95)
- Neon Rider (1995–98)
- News from Zoos (1988–93)
- Ninja Turtles: The Next Mutation (1997–98)
- No Sweat (1997–98)
- Ocean Girl (1998–2002)
- The Odyssey (1998–99)
- One Foot in the Grave (1999)
- Operation Ouch! (2017)
- OWL/TV (1992–95)
- The Paul Daniels Magic Show (1990–94)
- Pollywog (1989–94)
- Positive Parenting (1990–93)
- Power Rangers (1993–94; 2011–14)
- Press Gang (1992–93)
- Profiles of Nature (1992–94)
- Raven's Home (2017)
- Ready or Not (2003–06)
- The Real World (1993–94)
- Red Dwarf (1990–94)
- The Red Green Show (1993–95)
- Robin of Sherwood (1988–90)
- Ronnie & The Browns (1990–93)
- Rough Guide (1993–99)
- The Roy Rogers Show (1988–92)
- Sabrina the Teenage Witch (2002–11)
- The Sausage Factory (2005–06)
- Scariest Places on Earth (2001–03)
- Second Honeymoon (1988)
- Small Talk (1995–98)
- Smith & Smith (1988–92)
- Snowy River: The McGregor Saga (1994–96)
- Space: 1999 (1990–92)
- Spatz (1990–94)
- Stars On Ice (1988)
- Starstreet (2002)
- Stingray (1992–95)
- Streetnoise (1990–94, 1996)
- Super Dave (1993–98)
- Superhuman Samurai Syber-Squad (1994–95)
- Surf Shack (1998–2000)
- Surf's Up! Let's Cook (1998–2000)
- S.W.A.L.K. (1988–1990)
- Swans Crossing (1992)
- Sweet Valley High (1994–98)
- Swiss Family Robinson (1994–95)
- Tarzán (1993–98)
- That's Incredible! (1989–92)
- They Must Be Mad (1993–98)
- The Third Man (1988–90)
- Thumb Wrestling Federation
- Thunderbirds (1992–95)
- Tilt 23 1/2 (1994–96)
- Today's Parent (1994)
- The Tomorrow People (1988–89)
- Topper (1989–90)
- The Tripods (1988–91)
- The Trouble with Tracy (1988–90)
- The Twilight Zone (1994–96)
- Vid Kids (1991–92)
- Whatever Turns You On (1988–90)
- Wheel 2000 (1998–99)
- The White Shadow (1990–91)
- Whose Line is it Anyway? (1995–96)
- Wide World of Kids (1991–92)
- Wild Guess (1988–93)
- The Wild Side (1991–92)
- Willy and Floyd (1988–91)
- Wipeout (2012–14)
- Wipeout Canada (2014)
- Wishbone (1996–2000)
- Wonder Why? (1994–95)
- Wonderstruck (1989–93)
- World's Funniest Videos: Top 10 Countdown
- The Worst Witch (1998–2002)
- Worzel Gummidge (1988–91)
- Yes, Dear
- Yes Minister (1995–97, 1999–2002)
- Yes You Can (1988–91)
- You Can't Do That on Television (1988–94)
- The Young Ones (1996–97)
- Young Sherlock: The Mystery of the Manor House (1988, 1990)
- Zorro (1990–95)

==== Animated series ====
- 6teen (2014–16; 2022–23; 2024–25)
- 44 Cats (2019–20)
- Action Man (2000–03)
- The Adventures of Rocky and Bullwinkle and Friends (1990–96, 1998–2002)
- Adventures of Sonic the Hedgehog (1994–95)
- The Adventures of Tintin (2000–01)
- Alienators: Evolution Continues (2001–02)
- All Dogs Go to Heaven: The Series (1996–99)
- Alvin and the Chipmunks (1994–2005)
- The Amazing Adrenalini Brothers (2006–08)
- Artifacts (2000)
- Bakugan (2023–25)
- Barbie Dreamhouse Adventures (2018–22)
- Barbie: It Takes Two (2022–25)
- Biker Mice from Mars (1993–95)
- Blackstar (1988–90)
- Bob and Margaret (2005–07)
- Bobby's World (1997–2000)
- The Bots Master (1994–96)
- Braceface (2024)
- Brambly Hedge (1997–99)
- Brats of the Lost Nebula (1998–2001)
- Bratz (2005–06)
- Bucky O'Hare and the Toad Wars (1991–93)
- Bump in the Night (1995–98)
- Cadillacs and Dinosaurs (1993–94)
- Captain Planet and the Planeteers (1992–95)
- Captain Power and the Soldiers of the Future (1995–97)
- Care Bears (2003–05)
- Casper the Friendly Ghost (1990–97)
- Casper's Scare School (2009–10)
- The Charlie Brown and Snoopy Show (1996–2004)
- Charlie Chalk (1991–95)
- Code Lyoko (2004–05)
- Committed (2006)
- COPS (1994–97)
- Count Duckula (1989–93)
- The Cramp Twins (2003–04)
- Cubix (2002–03)
- Dark Water (1991)
- Dawdle the Donkey (1998–2002)
- Dennis the Menace (1986 TV series) (1997–99)
- Denver, the Last Dinosaur (1989–94)
- Dino Babies (1994–97)
- Dino-Riders (1989–90)
- D'Myna Leagues (2001–05)
- Dog City (1994–95, 1998–2000)
- Dragon Flyz (1996–99)
- DuckTales (2017) (2017; 2021)
- Dumb Bunnies (1998–2003)
- Eek! The Cat (1992–97)
- Enchanted Lands: Tales from the Faraway Tree (1998–2001)
- Ever After High (2013–16)
- Extreme Ghostbusters (1997–99)
- Fantastic Four: World's Greatest Heroes (2006–08)
- Fat Albert and the Cosby Kids (1988–90)
- Flash Gordon (1996–99)
- Flying Rhino Junior High (2003–06, 2010–12)
- Futurama (2007–09)
- Garfield and Friends (1993–2001)
- The Garfield Show (2009–14)
- Generation O! (2000–02)
- Geronimo Stilton
- Ghostbusters (1988–93)
- Grizzly Tales for Gruesome Kids (2000–03)
- Growing Up Creepie (2008)
- Hanazuki: Full of Treasures (2017)
- He-Man and the Masters of the Universe (1988–92)
- He-Man and the Masters of the Universe (2002–04)
- Hero High (1988–89)
- Home Movies (2000–02)
- Insektors (1996–98)
- Inspector Gadget (2007–08)
- Jackie Chan Adventures (2000–05)
- Jem (1990–91)
- Kung Fu Dino Posse (2010)
- Lego City Adventures (2020–22)
- Lisa
- Littlest Pet Shop (2012, 2013–17)
- Looped (2016, 2020)
- Mad Jack the Pirate (1998–99)
- Mamemo (2000–01)
- Mary-Kate and Ashley in Action! (2001–03)
- Men in Black: The Series (2002, 2005)
- The Mighty Hercules (1995–96)
- Mighty Max (1994–96)
- Monster High (2010–15)
- The Mr. Men Show (2008–11)
- Mummies Alive! (1997–98, 2001)
- Muppet Babies (1992–94, 1996)
- My Little Pony (1989–90, 1992)
- My Little Pony Tales (1993–94)
- The New Adventures of He-Man (1991–92)
- The New Adventures of Zorro (1988)
- The New Archies (1992–95)
- The New Fred and Barney Show (1994–95)
- Night Hood (1996–98)
- Ninjago (2018–20)
- Ninjago: March of the Oni
- Oggy and the Cockroaches (1998–2001)
- Painting Pictures (2000)
- The Pink Panther (1993–98)
- Pippi Longstocking (1999–2001; 2006–2007)
- Plonsters (1999–2000)
- Pound Puppies (1986 TV series) (1989)
- Pound Puppies (2010 TV series) (2010–13)
- Power Players (2019–20)
- Princess Gwenevere and the Jewel Riders (1996–98)
- Rabbids Invasion (2013–15)
- Regal Academy (December 31, 2016–18)
- Rex the Runt (1999–2000)
- Robotboy (2006–08)
- Romuald the Reindeer (1996–99)
- Roswell Conspiracies: Aliens, Myths and Legends (1999–2001)
- SantApprentice (2008–11)
- Santo Bugito (1995–96)
- She-Ra: Princess of Power (1988–93)
- Shopkins (2017–19)
- Shuriken School (2006–09)
- Skunk Fu! (2008–09)
- Snailympics
- Space Strikers (1994–96)
- Spartakus and the Sun Beneath the Sea (1988–89)
- Spider-Man: The Animated Series (1994–99)
- Spider-Man: The New Animated Series (2003–05)
- Spliced (2014–16)
- Street Sharks (1995–96)
- Stressed Eric (1998–2002)
- Stuart Little: The Animated Series (2003–04)
- Super Duper Sumos (2001–02)
- The Super Mario Bros. Super Show! (1991–96)
- Teenage Mutant Ninja Turtles (1987 TV series) (1988–94)
- Tenko and the Guardians of the Magic (1995–96)
- The Three Friends and Jerry (1999–2001)
- Toxic Crusaders (1991–92)
- Transformers: Animated (2007–09)
- Transformers: Cyberverse (September 28, 2018; 2021–22)
- Transformers: Generation 2 (1994)
- Trollz (September 4, 2005)
- The Twisted Tales of Felix the Cat (1996–99)
- The Undersea Adventures of Captain Nemo (1989–90)
- The Wacky World of Tex Avery (1997–98)
- Waldo Kitty (1988–1992)
- Walter Melon (1998–2001)
- Wayside (2015–17; 2019–21; 2024–25)
- Winx Club (original series; 2004–07)
- The Wizard of Oz (1997)
- Wolverine and the X-Men (2008–09)
- The World of Peter Rabbit and Friends (1998–99)
- X-Men (1995–98)
- X-Men: Evolution (2001–05)

==== Anime ====
- Adventures of the Little Mermaid (1991–94)
- The Adventures of the Little Prince (1988–90)
- Astro Boy (2004)
- B-Daman Crossfire (2013–14)
- Bakugan: Battle Planet (2019–23)
- Battle B-Daman (2005–08)
- Beyblade (2002–06)
- Beyblade: Metal Fury (2013–14)
- Beyblade: Metal Fusion (2010–12)
- Beyblade: Metal Masters (2011–13)
- Beyblade: Shogun Steel (2013–15)
- BeyWarriors: BeyRaiderz (2014–15)
- BeyWheelz (2012–13)
- Bleach (2006–10)
- Blue Dragon (2008–09)
- Bob in a Bottle (1992–94)
- Case Closed (2006)
- Death Note (2007–08)
- D.I.C.E. (2005–06)
- Digimon (1999–2004)
- Dinosaur King (2008–10)
- Dinozaurs (2000–01)
- Dragon Ball (1996–98, 2003–05)
- Dragon Ball GT (2003–05)
- Dragon Ball Z (1997–2005)
- Duel Masters (2004–05)
- Eureka Seven (2006–08)
- Friends of the Forest (1995–97)
- Fullmetal Alchemist (2005–08)
- G.I. Joe: Sigma 6 (2006–07)
- Ghost in the Shell: Stand Alone Complex (2005–07)
- .hack//Sign (2005–06)
- Hamtaro (2002–06)
- Hello Kitty and Friends (1995–97)
- Idaten Jump (2007)
- Inuyasha (2003–07)
- Jungle Tales (1992–94)
- Keroppi and Friends (1995–97)
- Kinnikuman
- Knights of the Zodiac (2003–04)
- The Littl' Bits (1992–94)
- Maple Town (1988–89)
- Maya the Bee (1992–98)
- Medabots (2001–04)
- Mew Mew Power (2005–07)
- Mobile Suit Gundam SEED (2004–07)
- Mobile Suit Gundam SEED Destiny (2007–08)
- Mobile Suit Gundam Wing (2000–03)
- Monster Rancher (1999–2003)
- Monsuno (2012–13)
- Naruto (2005–09)
- One Piece (2005–06)
- Pandalian (2006)
- Pinocchio: The Series (1991–93)
- Pokémon Chronicles (2005–07)
- Power Stone (2002–04)
- Pretty Cure (2009–10)
- Saber Rider and the Star Sheriffs (1989–91)
- Sailor Moon (1995–98, 2000–04)
- Samurai Pizza Cats (1992–97)
- Shaman King (2005–06)
- Sonic X (2005)
- Speed Racer (1994–96)
- Superior Defender Gundam Force (2004–05)
- Transformers: Armada (2002–04)
- Transformers: Cybertron (2005–07)
- Transformers: Energon (2004–05)
- Transformers: Robots in Disguise (2001)
- The Vision of Escaflowne (2000–01)
- Witch Hunter Robin (2004–06)
- Yu-Gi-Oh! (2002–07)
- Yu-Gi-Oh! 5D's (2008–12)
- Yu-Gi-Oh! GX (2005–08)
- Yu-Gi-Oh! Zexal (2011–14)
- Zatch Bell! (2005–07)
- Zoids: Chaotic Century (2002–04)
- Zoids: Fuzors (2003–04)
- Zoids: New Century (2002–04)

==== Preschool series ====
- The Adventures of Snelgrove Snail (1990–94)
- The Adventures of Spot (1999–2001)
- Alphabet Soup (1988–91)
- Anatole (1999–2002)
- Angelina Ballerina (2001–02)
- Animal Stories (1999–2000)
- Archibald the Koala (1999–2001)
- Babar (2001–02)
- Bananas in Pyjamas (1995–99)
- Barney & Friends (1997–98)
- Beezoo's Attic (1998–2001)
- The Berenstain Bears (2009–11)
- Bertha (1993–95)
- Big Sister, Little Brother (1999–2000)
- Brownstone Kids (1991–95)
- Bump (2000)
- Camp Cariboo (1989–97)
- The Cat in the Hat Knows a Lot About That! (2012)
- The Country Mouse and the City Mouse Adventures (1999–2003)
- The Crayon Box (1998–2001)
- Elliott Moose (2000–02)
- The Forgotten Toys (1998–2001)
- The Friendly Giant (1991–95)
- George Shrinks (2003–12)
- Gigglesnort Hotel (1988–91)
- Hands Up Hands On (1994–96)
- Jellabies (2000–01)
- Kipper (1998–2000)
- Kitty Cats (1995–2001)
- Kleo the Misfit Unicorn (2001–02)
- Lamb Chop's Play-Along (1992–97)
- LazyTown (2004–08)
- Little Bear (2001–03, 2010–11)
- Madeline (1995–97)
- The Magic Key (2002)
- Marie-Soleil (1988–98)
- Mister Rogers' Neighborhood (1991–93)
- Once Upon a Hamster (1995–2001)
- Pablo the Little Red Fox (2000–01)
- Paul Hann and Friends (1988–91)
- Percy the Park Keeper (1998–2000)
- Picture Pages (1989–93)
- Pocket Dragon Adventures (1998–99)
- The Poddington Peas (1991–95)
- Poetree and Friends (1994–97)
- Polka Dot Door (1994-98)
- Postman Pat (1991–95, 1999–2000)
- Puttnam's Prairie Emporium (1990–95)
- Rescue Heroes (2011–14)
- Rolie Polie Olie (2009–12)
- Romper Room (1993–95)
- Sesame Street (2020)
- Seven Little Monsters (2002–05)
- Sharon, Lois & Bram's Elephant Show (1991–93)
- Sheeep (2000–02)
- Size Small (1991–95)
- Sky Dancers (1996–98)
- Spider! (2000)
- St. Bear's Dolls Hospital (2000–01)
- Take Off (1994–95)
- Take Part (1988–95, 1997–98)
- Tell-a-Tale Town (1996–98)
- Thomas the Tank Engine and Friends (1992–94)
- Tickle on the Tum (1988–91)
- Time to Read (1988–92)
- Timothy Goes to School (2008–13)
- The Toothbrush Family (1998–2000)
- Turtle Island (2001)
- The Twins
- Under the Umbrella Tree (1994–98)
- Waterville Gang (1988–95)
- What-a-Mess (1995–99)
- The Wind in the Willows (1994–96; 2000)

== See also ==
- Nelvana
- List of programs broadcast by Nickelodeon (Canada)
- List of programs broadcast by Cartoon Network (Canadian TV channel)
- List of programs broadcast by Treehouse TV
