= List of programs broadcast by Cartoon Network (Canada) =

This is a list of programs broadcast by Cartoon Network Canada. Télétoon has a different schedule than the English version, although many of the same programs are aired on both channels. For television programs broadcast during their respective nighttime blocks, see Teletoon at Night and Télétoon la nuit. Premiere airdates are provided in parentheses where available.

== Current programming ==
As of November 2026:

=== Other acquired programming ===
Title	Premiere date	Source(s)
Beyblade X	July 14, 2024	
Pokémon	September 2, 2014	

=== Reruns of ended programming ===
==== Teletoon original programming ====
Title	Premiere date	Finale date	Reruns	Source(s)
Hotel Transylvania: The Series	October 2, 2017	October 29, 2020	2020–present	
Total DramaRama	October 7, 2018	April 22, 2023	2023–present	

==== Cartoon Network (United States) original programming ====
Title	Date(s) reran	Source(s)
Adventure Time	March 20, 2011–present	
Steven Universe	April 24, 2014–present	
We Bare Bears	July 27, 2015–present	

==== Other acquired programming ====
Title	Date(s) reran	Source(s)
Grossology	2023–present	
Mermicorno: Starfall	2026–present	

== Former programming ==
- ^{1} Indicates program moved to YTV.
- ^{2} Indicates program moved to Family Channel/WildBrainTV.
- ^{3} Indicates program moved to Treehouse TV.

=== Teletoon original programming ===
- 6teen (November 7, 2004)
- A Treasure in My Garden (September 3, 2003)
- The Adventures of Paddington Bear (October 17, 1997)
- The Amazing Spiez! (September 6, 2010)
- Angela Anaconda (October 5, 1999)
- Animal Crackers (October 17, 1997)
- Atomic Betty (August 29, 2004)
- Atomic Puppet (September 11, 2016)
- Bad Dog (March 1, 1999)
- The Bagel and Becky Show (November 14, 2016)
- Bakugan Battle Brawlers (July 8, 2007)
- Bakugan: Battle Planet (December 31, 2018)
- The Baskervilles (March 10, 2000)
- Best Ed (October 3, 2008)
- Blake and Mortimer
- Blaster's Universe (January 4, 2000)
- Braceface (June 2, 2001)
- Bravest Warriors (Season 4) (September 3, 2018)
- Bromwell High (February 1, 2005)
- Caillou^{3} (October 17, 1997)
- Camp Lakebottom (July 4, 2013)
- Carl² (August 7, 2005)
- Chaotic (March 16, 2007)
- Chop Chop Ninja (October 6, 2018)
- Chop Chop Ninja Challenge (November 24, 2014)
- Chop Socky Chooks (March 16, 2007)
- Class of the Titans (December 31, 2005)
- Clone High (November 2, 2002)
- Cracked
- Crash Canyon (September 18, 2011)
- Creepschool (March 13, 2004)
- Cupcake & Dino: General Services (September 3, 2018)
- Cybersix (September 6, 1999)
- D.N. Ace (July 6, 2019)
- Daft Planet (September 2, 2002)
- The Dating Guy (October 17, 2010)
- The Day My Butt Went Psycho! (June 12, 2014)
- Delilah & Julius (August 14, 2005)
- Delta State (September 11, 2004)
- Detentionaire (September 12, 2011)
- Di-Gata Defenders (August 5, 2006)
- Donkey Kong Country (October 17, 1997)
- Doodlez (September 6, 2002)
- Dr. Dimensionpants (November 6, 2014)
- Eckhart (September 8, 2000)
- Edward (January 23, 2002)
- Endangered Species (March 3, 2015)
- Flight Squad (March 27, 2000)
- Fly Tales (September 6, 1999)
- Flying Rhino Junior High (October 3, 1998)
- For Better or For Worse (November 5, 2000)
- Freaktown (June 20, 2016)
- Fred the Caveman (September 2, 2002)
- Fred's Head (January 12, 2008)
- Fugget About It (September 7, 2012)
- The Future Is Wild (June 28, 2010)
- Futz! (September 3, 2007)
- George of the Jungle (June 29, 2007)
- Gerald McBoing-Boing (August 29, 2005)
- Grojband (September 5, 2013)
- Harry and His Bucket Full of Dinosaurs^{3} (March 28, 2005)
- Hot Wheels Battle Force 5 (September 13, 2009)
- Iggy Arbuckle (June 29, 2007)
- Inspector Gadget^{2} (September 7, 2015)
- Jimmy Two-Shoes (February 21, 2009)
- John Callahan's Quads! (February 2, 2001)
- Johnny Test^{2} (September 3, 2006)
- Journey to the West: Legends of the Monkey King (2000)
- Just Kidding^{1} (February 3, 2013)
- Kaput & Zösky (September 3, 2002)
- Kid Paddle (September 1, 2003)
- The Kids from Room 402 (August 29, 2000)
- Knuckleheads (June 6, 2016)
- Life's a Zoo (September 1, 2008)
- Looped (March 2, 2016)
- Maggie and the Ferocious Beast^{3} (August 26, 2000)
- Majority Rules! (September 10, 2009)
- Marvin the Tap-Dancing Horse^{3} (September 30, 2000)
- Matt Hatter Chronicles (September 8, 2012)
- Mega Babies (October 10, 1999)
- MetaJets (October 3, 2010)
- A Miss Mallard Mystery (September 4, 2000)
- Miss Spider's Sunny Patch Friends^{3} (September 11, 2004)
- Mudpit (January 5, 2012)
- My Babysitter's a Vampire^{1} (March 14, 2011)
- My Dad the Rock Star (September 1, 2003)
- My Life Me (September 10, 2011)
- Nanook's Great Hunt
- Ned's Newt (October 17, 1997)
- New Tales from the Cryptkeeper (October 10, 1999)
- Night Sweats (February 29, 2016)
- Olliver's Adventures (September 7, 2002)
- Packages from Planet X (July 13, 2013)
- Pecola (September 3, 2001)
- Pig City (April 16, 2002)
- Pippi Longstocking (October 17, 1997)
- Pirate Express (April 26, 2015)
- Planet Sketch (November 19, 2005)
- Potatoes and Dragons (January 5, 2004)
- Punch! (January 11, 2008)
- Ratz (September 21, 2003)
- Redwall (September 8, 1999)
- Rescue Heroes (October 2, 1999)
- Ricky Sprocket: Showbiz Boy (August 31, 2007)
- RoboRoach (January 8, 2002)
- Rocket Monkeys (January 10, 2013)
- Silverwing (September 6, 2003)
- Simon in the Land of Chalk Drawings (September 2, 2002)
- Skatoony (October 28, 2010)
- Skyland (November 26, 2005)
- Sons of Butcher (August 5, 2005)
- Splat!
- Spliced (April 1, 2010)
- Spider Riders (March 25, 2006)
- Station X (September 3, 2005)
- Stoked (June 25, 2009)
- Super Dinosaur (September 8, 2018)
- Supernoobs^{2} (September 20, 2016)
- Toad Patrol (October 2, 1999)
- The Tofus (September 6, 2004)
- ToonMarty (May 1, 2017)
- Total Drama (July 8, 2007)
- Totally Spies! (September 2, 2002)
- Undergrads (April 1, 2001)
- Untalkative Bunny (April 15, 2001)
- W (July 12, 2006)
- Wayside (March 16, 2007)
- What About Mimi? (March 6, 2000)
- What's with Andy? (June 30, 2001)
- Winston Steinburger and Sir Dudley Ding Dong (January 2, 2017)
- Wishfart (June 9, 2018)
- World of Quest (August 10, 2008)
- Yakkity Yak (January 4, 2003)
- Zeroman (September 11, 2004)
- The Zimmer Twins (March 14, 2005)

=== Cartoon Network/Boomerang/HBO Max/Adult Swim (United States) original programming ===
- 12 oz. Mouse (September 1, 2006)
- Adventure Time: Fionna and Cake (September 15, 2023)
- The Amazing World of Gumball (September 8, 2012)
- Apple & Onion
- Aqua Teen Hunger Force (January 4, 2004)
- Aquaman: King of Atlantis (October 15, 2021)
- Assy McGee (September 3, 2007)
- Baby Blues (September 8, 2002)
- Baby Looney Tunes
- The Batman (November 6, 2004)
- Batman: The Brave and the Bold
- Beast Boy: Lone Wolf (July 18, 2025)
- Ben 10 (2005)
- Ben 10 (2016)
- Ben 10: Alien Force (September 6, 2008)
- Ben 10: Omniverse (September 22, 2012)
- Ben 10: Ultimate Alien (September 12, 2010)
- Beware the Batman
- Be Cool, Scooby-Doo! (October 8, 2015)
- The Boondocks (February 17, 2006)
- The Brak Show (September 12, 2004)
- Bunnicula
- Camp Lazlo
- Chowder (September 6, 2008)
- Clarence (September 4, 2014)
- Codename: Kids Next Door
- Courage the Cowardly Dog (September 7, 2002)
- Cow and Chicken
- Craig of the Creek (May 3, 2018)
- DC Super Hero Girls (April 21, 2019)
- Dexter's Laboratory
- Dorothy and the Wizard of Oz
- DreamWorks Dragons
- Duck Dodgers
- Ed, Edd n Eddy (September 7, 2002)
- Ellen's Acres (February 2007)
- Elliott from Earth (April 4, 2021)
- Evil Con Carne
- Foster's Home for Imaginary Friends (March 11, 2005)
- Frisky Dingo (September 4, 2007)
- The Fungies! (January 10, 2021)
- Generator Rex (January 9, 2011)
- Green Lantern: The Animated Series
- Gremlins (May 26, 2023)
- Grim & Evil (September 2, 2002)
- The Grim Adventures of Billy & Mandy
- Harvey Birdman, Attorney at Law (March 7, 2003)
- The Heroic Quest of the Valiant Prince Ivandoe (April 1, 2023)
- The High Fructose Adventures of Annoying Orange
- Hole in the Wall
- Home Movies
- Incredible Crew (January 28, 2013)
- Infinity Train (September 23, 2019)
- Jellystone! (October 10, 2021)
- Jessica's Big Little World (October 7, 2023)
- Johnny Bravo
- Justice League
- Justice League Action
- Justice League Unlimited
- Lego Nexo Knights (January 8, 2016)
- Legends of Chima
- Level Up (July 7, 2012)
- The Life and Times of Juniper Lee
- Little Ellen
- Looney Tunes Cartoons (October 11, 2020)
- The Looney Tunes Show (September 5, 2011)
- Lucy, the Daughter of the Devil (September 3, 2008)
- Mad
- Mao Mao: Heroes of Pure Heart (September 6, 2019)
- The Marvelous Misadventures of Flapjack
- Megas XLR (September 11, 2004)
- Metalocalypse (September 3, 2007)
- Mike, Lu & Og
- Minoriteam (September 6, 2007)
- Mixels
- Moral Orel (September 4, 2007)
- ¡Mucha Lucha!
- My Adventures with Superman (July 7, 2023)
- My Gym Partner's a Monkey
- New Looney Tunes (November 6, 2015)
- O Canada
- The Oblongs
- OK K.O.! Let's Be Heroes
- Out of Jimmy's Head (September 6, 2008)
- Perfect Hair Forever (September 5, 2007)
- The Powerpuff Girls
- The Powerpuff Girls (2016)
- Regular Show
- Rick and Morty (September 3, 2017)
- Robot Chicken (September 1, 2006)
- Saul of the Mole Men (May 16, 2009)
- Scooby-Doo and Guess Who? (October 4, 2019)
- Scooby-Doo! Mystery Incorporated
- Sealab 2021 (September 5, 2007)
- Secret Mountain Fort Awesome (January 12, 2013)
- The Secret Saturdays
- Sheep in the Big City (September 2, 2002)
- Space Ghost Coast to Coast (September 1, 2006)
- Squidbillies (September 1, 2006)
- Squirrel Boy (September 8, 2007)
- Star Wars: Clone Wars
- Star Wars: The Clone Wars (September 7, 2009)
- Steven Universe Future (December 15, 2019)
- Stroker & Hoop (September 1, 2006)
- Summer Camp Island (August 13, 2018)
- The Super Hero Squad Show
- Sym-Bionic Titan
- Teen Titans
- Teen Titans Go! (September 6, 2013)
- ThunderCats
- ThunderCats Roar (February 23, 2020)
- Tig n' Seek (November 8, 2020)
- Tim and Eric Awesome Show, Great Job! (June 1, 2012)
- Time Squad (September 5, 2002)
- Tiny Toons Looniversity (September 15, 2023)
- Tom Goes to the Mayor (September 1, 2006)
- Tom and Jerry in New York (September 18, 2021)
- The Tom and Jerry Show (March 1, 2014)
- Tom and Jerry Special Shorts (April 18, 2021)
- Transformers: Cyberverse (September 16, 2018)
- Transformers: Robots in Disguise (March 21, 2015)
- Uncle Grandpa
- Unikitty! (March 17, 2018)
- The Venture Bros. (March 13, 2005)
- Victor and Valentino (June 1, 2019)
- Wacky Races (2017)
- We Baby Bears (January 1, 2022)
- Whatever Happened to... Robot Jones?
- What's New, Scooby-Doo?
- Xavier: Renegade Angel (May 17, 2009)
- Yabba Dabba Dinosaurs (September 5, 2020)
- Young Justice (September 9, 2011)

=== Other acquired programming ===
- The 13 Ghosts of Scooby-Doo
- 1001 Nights
- 2 Stupid Dogs (1997)
- 3 Amigonauts
- A Pup Named Scooby-Doo
- Ace Ventura: Pet Detective
- The Addams Family
- The Adventures of Teddy Ruxpin
- The Adventures of Tintin
- Albert the Fifth Musketeer
- Alien Racers
- Alvin and the Chipmunks
- Alvinnn!!! and the Chipmunks (September 9, 2015)
- American Dad! (September 1, 2008)
- Angry Birds Toons (March 16, 2013)
- Angry Kid
- Animalia
- Animaniacs (1993)
- Animaniacs (2020) (November 20, 2020)
- Apollo's Pad
- Archer (October 17, 2010)
- Archie's Weird Mysteries
- Avengers Assemble
- The Avengers: Earth's Mightiest Heroes
- The Avengers: United They Stand
- The Awesomes (September 4, 2014)
- Axe Cop
- The Babaloos
- Batman: The Animated Series
- Beyblade Burst (September 10, 2016)
- Beyond Human (September 9, 2011)
- Birdz
- Blazing Dragons (1997)
- Bob and Scott
- Bob's Burgers (September 7, 2015)
- Bolts & Blip (June 28, 2010)
- The Bored Witch
- Bratz
- The Brothers Flub
- The Bugs Bunny & Tweety Show (September 2, 2002)
- Bureau of Alien Detectors
- Butt-Ugly Martians
- Cadillacs and Dinosaurs
- Captain Star (1997)
- Cardcaptors (2000)
- Chaotic (March 16, 2007)
- Chaotic: Secrets of the Lost City
- The Cleveland Show (September 1, 2018)
- Coconut Fred's Fruit Salad Island!
- Code Monkeys (September 4, 2008)
- Cromartie High School
- The Critic (September 3, 2008)
- Dilbert
- Dinofroz
- Diabolik
- Dog City
- Domo
- Dragon Ball Z (13 episodes, 1997)
- Dragons: Defenders of Berk
- Duckman (1997)
- DuckTales
- Family Guy (September 1, 2003)
- The Fantastic Four
- Fat Albert and the Cosby Kids
- Father of the Pride (September 5, 2008)
- Fireball XL5
- The Flintstones (1997)
- Frame by Frame (1997)
- Futurama (September 2, 2002)
- Future Card Buddyfight
- G.I. Joe: Renegades (January 9, 2011)
- The Game of Life (September 9, 2012)
- Get Ace (September 8, 2015)
- Gods of Olympus
- Gogs
- Golan the Insatiable
- Goosebumps
- Gordon the Garden Gnome
- Gormiti (2008) (January 2010)
- Gormiti (2018) (April 5, 2019)
- Guano!
- Hanazuki: Full of Treasures
- The Haunting Hour: The Series
- The Head
- Hey Joel
- Highlander: The Animated Series (1997)
- Home Things
- Hot Wheels: AcceleRacers
- Hulk and the Agents of S.M.A.S.H.
- Immortal Grand Prix (November 2003)
- Iron Man: Armored Adventures
- Ivanhoe: The King's Knight
- The Jetsons (September 6, 2004)
- Jonny Quest (1997)
- Josie and the Pussycats (1997)
- Jungle Show
- Kaijudo (September 8, 2012)
- Kappa Mikey
- Kassai and Leuk
- King of the Hill (September 7, 2009)
- Kong: The Animated Series
- Larva
- League of Super Evil
- The Legend of Calamity Jane
- Lego City Adventures
- Lego Star Wars: The Freemaker Adventures
- Lego Star Wars: The Yoda Chronicles
- The Little Lulu Show (May 6, 2006)
- Little People
- Loonatics Unleashed
- Looney Tunes (1997)
- Lucas Bros. Moving Co. (October 24, 2016)
- Macross Plus
- The Magic School Bus
- Major Lazer (October 24, 2016)
- Man vs. Cartoon
- Martian Successor Nadesico
- Masha and the Bear
- Matt's Monsters (April 5, 2013)
- Max Steel
- Max Steel
- The Maxx
- Mega Man Star Force (November 2007)
- MegaMan NT Warrior
- The Mighty Hercules
- Mighty Max (March 10, 2001)
- Mission Hill
- Monster Farm
- The Mouse and the Monster
- Mysticons (September 9, 2017)
- Mythic Warriors: Guardians of the Legend
- Nanook
- Napoleon Dynamite
- NASCAR Racers
- The New Batman Adventures
- The New Batman/Superman Adventures
- The New Scooby and Scrappy-Doo Show
- The New Scooby-Doo Movies
- Night Hood
- Ninja Scroll
- Ninjago (2012)
- Numb Chucks
- Oh No! It's an Alien Invasion (November 3, 2014)
- Ozzy & Drix
- Patrol 03
- Pet Alien (2005)
- Phantom Investigators (September 7, 2002)
- Pink Panther and Pals
- Pinky and the Brain
- Pond Life (1997)
- Power Players (September 1, 2019)
- Power Rangers
- Power Rangers Beast Morphers (May 11, 2019)
- Power Rangers Dino Charge
- Power Rangers Dino Fury (March 13, 2021)
- Power Rangers Dino Super Charge (February 6, 2016)
- Power Rangers Ninja Steel
- Power Rangers Super Megaforce
- The Prince of Tennis
- Princess Natasha
- Princess Sissi
- Rainbow Fish
- Rave Master
- The Real Ghostbusters
- Redbeard
- The Ren & Stimpy Show
- Richie Rich
- Rick & Steve: The Happiest Gay Couple in All the World
- Right Now Kapow (June 7, 2018)
- The Ripping Friends
- Road Rovers
- The Road Runner Show (1997)
- Robin
- Robinson Sucroe
- Rocket Robin Hood
- Roughnecks: Starship Troopers Chronicles
- Sabrina: The Animated Series (1999)
- Sabrina's Secret Life
- Santo Bugito (1997)
- The Savage Dragon
- The Scooby-Doo Show
- Scooby-Doo, Where Are You! (1997)
- The Secret World of Santa Claus
- Shaggy & Scooby-Doo Get a Clue! (September 8, 2007)
- Shaun the Sheep
- Silver Surfer
- The Simpsons (1997)
- Slurps
- The Smoggies
- The Smurfs
- Sonic Underground (1998)
- Space Goofs (1997)
- The Spectacular Spider-Man (September 7, 2008)
- Spicy City
- Spider-Man
- Spider-Man Unlimited (December 1999)
- Spy Groove
- The Stanley Dynamic
- Star Trek: The Animated Series
- Star Wars: Galaxy of Adventures
- Storm Hawks
- Superman: The Animated Series
- SWAT Kats: The Radical Squadron
- The Sylvester & Tweety Mysteries
- Taz-Mania
- Teenage Mutant Ninja Turtles
- Teenage Mutant Ninja Turtles
- Tenkai Knights
- Those Scurvy Rascals
- The Tick
- Tiny Toon Adventures
- Tin and Zig
- Todd McFarlane's Spawn
- Tom and Jerry
- Tom & Jerry Kids
- The Tom and Jerry Show (1975)
- Tom and Jerry Tales
- Top Cat (1997)
- Transformers
- Transformers: Prime (January 9, 2011)
- Transformers: Rescue Bots
- Transformers: Rescue Bots Academy (January 13, 2019)
- The Triplets
- Tripping the Rift
- Turning Mecard (May 28, 2017)
- Twipsy
- Ultimate Spider-Man (September 7, 2012)
- The Upstairs Downstairs Bears
- Voltron: The Third Dimension
- Voltron Force
- Wacky Races (1968)
- Wait Till Your Father Gets Home (September 6, 2004)
- Wild C.A.T.s
- Wild Grinders
- The Wind in the Willows
- Wolverine and the X-Men
- The Wrong Coast
- X-Men: The Animated Series
- X-Men: Evolution
- Xyber 9: New Dawn
- The Yogi Bear Show (1997)
- Young Robin Hood
- Yu-Gi-Oh! Arc-V (July 24, 2015)
- Yu-Gi-Oh! VRAINS (September 1, 2018)
- Yu-Gi-Oh! Zexal (May 4, 2014)

== Programming blocks ==
- Original blocks – Initially, Teletoon's programming was divided into dayparted blocks, each featuring a different style of animation. Each blocks were represented as planets: Morning Planet for Preschoolers (claymation animation; 5:00 a.m. -3:00 p.m. EST), Afternoon Planet for Kids (2D cel animation; 3:00 p.m.- 6:00 p.m.), Evening Planet for Family (collage animation; 6:00 p.m. - 9:00 p.m. EST) and Night Planet for Adult (papier-mâché animation; 9:00 p.m. - 5:00 a.m. EST). The bumpers were made by Cuppa Coffee Studios. This branding would be discontinued in August 1998.
- Teletoon Retro – Teletoon Retro was the branding and block for classic animated programming. It was later spun into a digital channel, which also featured several live-action series. The channel launched on October 1, 2007, and closed on September 1, 2015.
- Can't Miss Thursdays – A block for first-run programming premieres that aired on Thursday nights. The block later featured live-action, hosted segments.
- Superfan Fridays – A block showcasing comic book-related and action-oriented animated series.

== See also ==
- Nelvana
- List of programs broadcast by Treehouse TV
- List of programs broadcast by YTV
