= DIY (disambiguation) =

DIY most often refers to "do it yourself".

DIY or Do it yourself may also refer to:

== Do it yourself ==
- DIY ethic
- DIY stores, or hardware stores, selling equipment for home improvement directly to consumers
- DIY audio, do-it-yourself audio equipment
- DIY moving, do-it-yourself packing and moving
- DIY networking, different types of grassroots networking
- DIY birth, or unassisted birth, the process of intentionally giving birth without professional assistance
- DIY biology, biotechnological social movement
- DIY music, another name for lo-fi music
- DIY investing, self-directed investing or self-managed investing

=== Titles and brands ===
- DIY Network, a television channel focusing on home do-it-yourself projects
- DiY-Fest, a festival of ultra-independent movies, books, zines, music, poetry, and performance art 1999–2002
- WarioWare D.I.Y., a video game for the Nintendo DS
  - WarioWare: D.I.Y. Showcase, a video game for the Wii
- Do It Yourself!!, a Japanese original anime television series
- "Do It Yourself" CBC TV Series (1982-1985)
- DIY.org, an online platform for children

== Music ==
- DIY music, another name for lo-fi music
- DIY♡ (Dance in Your Heart), a Hello! Project musical group created as part of the Satoyama Movement
- DiY Sound System, an English musical collective
- DIY (magazine), a United Kingdom-based music magazine

=== Albums ===
- Do It Yourself (Ian Dury & the Blockheads album), 1979
- Do It Yourself (The Seahorses album), 1997

=== Songs ===
- "D.I.Y." (song), by Peter Gabriel, 1978
- "D.I.Y.", by KMFDM from Adios, 1999
- "Do It Yourself" (song), 2007 single by Uniting Nations
- "DIY", by Savoy, 2011
- "D.I.Y", by Paul Heaton and Jacqui Abbott from What Have We Become?, 2014
- "DIY", by Stela Cole who represented Georgia in the American Song Contest, 2022
- "DIY" (Jolin Tsai song), 2025

== Other uses ==
- Diyarbakır Airport (IATA code)
- DIY (professional wrestling), a professional wrestling tag team
- Special Region of Yogyakarta (Daerah Istimewa Yogyakarta), a province-level region in Indonesia
