= List of programs broadcast by Nickelodeon (Canadian TV channel) =

This is a list of programs formerly broadcast by Nickelodeon, a Canadian version of the United States cable channel of the same name.

== Former programming ==
=== Programming from Nickelodeon (U.S.) ===
==== Live-action series ====
| Title | Premiere date | Finale date | Note(s) |
|---|---|---|---|
| Drake & Josh | November 2, 2009 | December 30, 2018 | |
| iCarly | November 2, 2009 | August 28, 2022 | |
| Just Jordan | November 2, 2009 | December 1, 2016 | |
| The Naked Brothers Band | November 2, 2009 | January 15, 2017 | |
| Romeo! | November 2, 2009 | December 17, 201 | |
| The Troop | November 2, 2009 | January 10, 2017 | |
| True Jackson, VP | November 2, 2009 | August 28, 2022 | |
| Unfabulous | November 2, 2009 | January 27, 2017 | |
| Big Time Rush | January 1, 2010 | May 28, 2017 | |
| Victorious | April 5, 2010 | August 28, 2022 | |
| House of Anubis | September 5, 2011 | October 1, 2016 | |
| Supah Ninjas | September 9, 2011 | February 19, 2017 | |
| Bucket & Skinner's Epic Adventures | September 10, 2011 | September 1, 2014 | |
| The Amanda Show | September 11, 2011 | June 3, 2013 | |
| Kenan & Kel | September 11, 2011 | May 27, 2019 | |
| How to Rock | June 4, 2012 | September 5, 2016 | |
| Figure It Out | March 4, 2013 | September 5, 2016 | |
| Marvin Marvin | September 7, 2013 | August 28, 2022 | |
| Sam & Cat | September 7, 2013 | August 28, 2022 | |
| Wendell & Vinnie | September 7, 2013 | February 24, 2017 | |
| The Haunted Hathaways | October 12, 2013 | December 30, 2018 | |
| Zoey 101 | January 1, 2014 | February 4, 2017 | |
| The Thundermans | March 1, 2014 | August 27, 2017 | |
| Every Witch Way | June 1, 2015 | February 27, 2017 | |
| Talia in the Kitchen | March 5, 2016 | January 31, 2017 | |
| WITS Academy | June 6, 2016 | May 27, 2019 | |
| You Gotta See This | June 6, 2016 | September 4, 2016 | |
| 100 Things to Do Before High School | September 5, 2016 | May 27, 2018 | |
| School of Rock | October 1, 2016 | August 28, 2022 | |
| Henry Danger | October 26, 2016 | August 28, 2022 | |
| Make It Pop | December 11, 2016 | August 31, 2025 | Now airs on Disney Channel |
| Game Shakers | December 31, 2016 | August 28, 2022 | |
| Star Falls | November 2, 2020 | July 26, 2023 | |
| The Crystal Maze | January 9, 2021 | May 29, 2021 | |
| All That | January 10, 2021 | August 29, 2021 | |
| Group Chat | June 5, 2021 | August 28, 2021 | |
| The Barbarian and the Troll | September 4, 2021 | December 25, 2021 | |
| Side Hustle | September 4, 2021 | December 18, 2021 | |
| Drama Club | September 5, 2021 | December 26, 2021 | |
| The Substitute | September 5, 2021 | December 26, 2021 | |
| Nicky, Ricky, Dicky & Dawn | January 8, 2022 | August 28, 2022 | |
| Danger Force | August 29, 2022 | August 31, 2025 | |
| The Really Loud House | September 2, 2023 | August 31, 2025 | |
| Tyler Perry's Young Dylan | September 2, 2023 | August 31, 2025 | |

==== Animated series ("Nicktoons") ====
| Title | Premiere date | Finale date | Note(s) |
|---|---|---|---|
| The Adventures of Jimmy Neutron, Boy Genius | November 2, 2009 | January 1, 2021 | |
| The Angry Beavers | November 2, 2009 | January 12, 2017 | |
| Avatar: The Last Airbender | November 2, 2009 | August 28, 2022 | |
| Back at the Barnyard | November 2, 2009 | August 28, 2022 | |
| CatDog | November 2, 2009 | August 25, 2019 | |
| Danny Phantom | November 2, 2009 | August 24, 2014 | |
| The Fairly OddParents | November 2, 2009 | November 12, 2021 | |
| Fanboy & Chum Chum | November 2, 2009 | August 28, 2022 | |
| The Mighty B! | November 2, 2009 | December 6, 2016 | |
| The Penguins of Madagascar | November 2, 2009 | August 28, 2022 | |
| The Ren & Stimpy Show | November 2, 2009 | June 10, 2018 | |
| Rocko's Modern Life | November 2, 2009 | August 28, 2022 | |
| Rugrats | November 2, 2009 | August 28, 2022 | |
| SpongeBob SquarePants | November 2, 2009 | August 31, 2025 | |
| El Tigre: The Adventures of Manny Rivera | January 9, 2010 | January 28, 2017 | |
| Invader Zim | January 9, 2010 | August 28, 2022 | |
| Tak and the Power of Juju | January 9, 2010 | February 22, 2017 | |
| All Grown Up! | January 10, 2010 | December 30, 2018 | |
| Catscratch | January 10, 2010 | September 5, 2010 | |
| Hey Arnold! | January 10, 2010 | August 28, 2022 | |
| The Wild Thornberrys | January 10, 2010 | November 11, 2016 | |
| Planet Sheen | January 2, 2011 | December 31, 2017 | |
| T.U.F.F. Puppy | January 7, 2011 | December 30, 2018 | |
| The Legend of Korra | September 3, 2012 | August 28, 2022 | |
| Winx Club | September 3, 2012 | September 4, 2016 | |
| Robot and Monster | March 4, 2013 | February 10, 2017 | |
| Teenage Mutant Ninja Turtles (2012) | September 2, 2013 | August 28, 2022 | |
| Monsters vs. Aliens | September 7, 2013 | November 23, 2016 | |
| Sanjay and Craig | September 7, 2013 | November 5, 2016 | |
| Doug | November 4, 2013 | January 18, 2017 | |
| My Life as a Teenage Robot | January 4, 2014 | August 28, 2022 | |
| Rocket Power | January 4, 2014 | August 31, 2014 | |
| As Told by Ginger | September 1, 2014 | January 10, 2017 | |
| Breadwinners | September 6, 2015 | May 26, 2019 | |
| Pig Goat Banana Cricket | October 18, 2015 | July 18, 2019 | |
| Kung Fu Panda: Legends of Awesomeness | September 5, 2016 | August 28, 2022 | |
| Harvey Beaks | September 10, 2016 | August 26, 2022 | |
| Bunsen Is a Beast | June 2, 2018 | May 26, 201 | |
| Welcome to the Wayne | June 2, 2018 | May 26, 201 | |
| Rise of the Teenage Mutant Ninja Turtles | November 3, 2018 | August 27, 2021 | |
| It's Pony | January 4, 2021 | August 27, 2021 | |
| The Adventures of Kid Danger | January 9, 2021 | February 27, 2022 | |
| The Loud House | January 9, 2021 | August 31, 2025 | |
| The Casagrandes | January 9, 2021 | August 31, 2025 | |

==== Preschool series ====
| Title | Premiere date | Finale date | Note(s) |
|---|---|---|---|
| The Backyardigans | November 2, 2009 | August 31, 2025 | |
| Blue's Clues | November 2, 2009 | November 8, 2019 | |
| Dora the Explorer | November 2, 2009 | August 26, 2022 | |
| Go, Diego, Go! | November 2, 2009 | September 2, 2016 | |
| Ni Hao, Kai-Lan | November 2, 2009 | September 2, 2016 | |
| Wonder Pets! | November 2, 2009 | September 2, 2016 | |
| The Fresh Beat Band | January 4, 2010 | August 31, 2015 | |
| Team Umizoomi | March 1, 2010 | February 27, 2015 | |
| Bubble Guppies | June 1, 2011 | August 31, 2025 | |
| Blaze and the Monster Machines | March 2, 2015 | August 31, 2025 | |
| Fresh Beat Band of Spies | September 1, 2015 | September 2, 2016 | |
| Dora and Friends: Into the City! | September 5, 2016 | September 23, 2016 | |
| Shimmer and Shine | September 5, 2016 | January 1, 2021 | |
| Sunny Day | November 11, 2019 | January 1, 2021 | |
| Butterbean's Café | August 31, 2020 | November 12, 2021 | |
| Nella the Princess Knight | January 4, 2021 | August 26, 2022 | |
| Baby Shark's Big Show! | 2023 | August 31, 2025 | |

=== Programming from YTV ===
==== Live-action series ====
| Title | Premiere date | Finale date | Note(s) |
|---|---|---|---|
| Family Biz | 2010 | 2011 | |
| How to Be Indie | September 5, 2011 | October 1, 2016 | |
| Monster Warriors | September 5, 2011 | June 4, 2012 | |
| Splatalot! | September 3, 2012 | May 26, 2013 | |
| Life with Boys | September 1, 2014 | April 30, 2017 | |
| Mr. Young | September 1, 2014 | February 28, 2018 | |
| The Stanley Dynamic | September 5, 2016 | August 31, 2025 | |
| Max & Shred | October 15, 2016 | December 29, 2019 | |
| Extreme Babysitting | October 27, 2016 | October 28, 2018 | |
| Ride | August 28, 2017 | September 3, 2021 | |

==== Animated series ====
| Title | Premiere date | Finale date | Note(s) |
|---|---|---|---|
| Captain Flamingo | November 2, 2009 | May 31, 2013 | |
| Edgar & Ellen | November 2, 2009 | January 1, 2016 | |
| Grossology | November 2, 2009 | May 31, 2013 | |
| Jacob Two-Two | November 2, 2009 | August 31, 2012 | |
| Jibber Jabber | November 2, 2009 | August 30, 2013 | |
| Kid vs. Kat | November 2, 2009 | February 10, 2017 | |
| League of Super Evil | November 2, 2009 | December 31, 2017 | |
| Storm Hawks | November 2, 2009 | August 30, 2013 | |
| Will and Dewitt | November 2, 2009 | September 2, 2011 | |
| Willa's Wild Life | November 2, 2009 | December 31, 2014 | |
| Zeke's Pad | November 2, 2009 | August 26, 2016 | |
| Babar and the Adventures of Badou | September 5, 2011 | March 13, 2015 | |
| Being Ian | September 5, 2011 | August 30, 2013 | |
| Clang Invasion | September 5, 2011 | May 31, 2013 | |
| Almost Naked Animals | September 3, 2012 | August 31, 2018 | |
| Sidekick | September 3, 2012 | August 29, 2014 | Now airs on Boomerang |
| Rated A for Awesome | October 1, 2013 | September 25, 2016 | |
| Scaredy Squirrel | October 1, 2013 | May 27, 2018 | |
| Pearlie | September 1, 2014 | February 27, 2015 | |
| Ruby Gloom | September 1, 2014 | June 2, 2025 | Now airs on Boomerang |
| Numb Chucks | August 28, 2017 | December 27, 2019 | |
| Mysticons | September 9, 2017 | August 31, 2025 | |
| 3 Amigonauts | March 13, 2021 | August 31, 2025 | |
| Cloudy With a Chance of Meatballs | August 29, 2022 | August 31, 2025 | |
| The ZhuZhus | January 6, 2025 | August 31, 2025 | |

=== Programming from Treehouse TV ===
==== Live-action series ====
| Title | Premiere date | Finale date | Note(s) |
|---|---|---|---|
| Big & Small | September 3, 2012 | February 13, 2015 | |
| Sing, Dance and Play With Bobs & LoLo | February 1, 2016 | September 2, 2016 | |

==== Animated series ====
| Title | Premiere date | Finale date | Note(s) |
|---|---|---|---|
| Max & Ruby | November 2, 2009 | August 31, 2025 | |
| My Friend Rabbit | November 2, 2009 | September 2, 2011 | |
| Toot & Puddle | November 2, 2009 | August 29, 2014 | |
| The Berenstain Bears | September 3, 2012 | September 2, 2013 | Now airs on Treehouse TV and Disney Channel |
| Franklin and Friends | September 3, 2012 | August 29, 2014 | |
| Zigby | September 1, 2014 | January 30, 2015 | |
| My Big Big Friend | March 2, 2015 | December 28, 2018 | |
| Mike the Knight | September 5, 2016 | August 31, 2025 | |
| Rusty Rivets | August 28, 2017 | January 3, 2022 | |
| Ranger Rob | December 30, 2019 | August 31, 2025 | |
| Agent Binky: Pets of the Universe | August 30, 2021 | August 31, 2025 | Now airs on Disney Channel and Treehouse TV |

=== Acquired programming ===
==== Live-action series ====
| Title | Premiere date | Finale date | Note(s) |
|---|---|---|---|
| H_{2}O: Just Add Water | November 2, 2009 | September 4, 2011 | |
| Power Rangers | March 5, 2011 | February 3, 2019 | |
| Fred: The Show | September 3, 2012 | August 29, 2022 | |
| What I Like About You | January 1, 2013 | December 31, 2013 | |
| Zoo Diaries | August 29, 2022 | August 31, 2025 | Now airs on Disney Channel and Nat Geo Wild |

==== Animated series ====
| Title | Premiere date | Finale date | Note(s) |
|---|---|---|---|
| Rabbids Invasion | September 5, 2015 | October 28, 2016 | |
| Looped | December 18, 2016 | August 28, 2020 | |
| Braceface | February 28, 2022 | August 26, 2024 | |
| Wayside | February 28, 2022 | December 31, 2023 | |
| Bravest Warriors | August 26, 2024 | August 31, 2025 | |

==== Preschool series ====
| Title | Premiere date | Finale date | Note(s) |
|---|---|---|---|
| Franklin | November 2, 2009 | August 27, 2010 | |
| George Shrinks | September 3, 2012 | September 2, 2013 | |
| Peter Rabbit | November 4, 2013 | September 2, 2016 | |
| Caillou | September 1, 2014 | September 2, 2016 | |
| Ryan's Mystery Playdate | August 30, 2021 | December 3, 2021 | |
| Maggie and the Ferocious Beast | January 2, 2023 | August 31, 2025 | |
| Babar | March 10, 2023 | August 31, 2025 | |

== See also ==
- List of programs broadcast by YTV
- List of programs broadcast by Treehouse TV
