= Mr. Microchip =

Canadian children's television series

Mr. Microchip is a live-action educational children's TV series focused on the world of computer technology and the (then) relatively new home computer trend of the early 1980s. Several 8-bit home computers of the era were seen in the show, including the Apple II, Commodore, Atari 8-bit computers, and Tandy Computers. It was originally broadcast in Canada on the CBC, between 1983 and 1985, and later shown in the UK, Australia and South Africa, but never screened in America.

== Production ==
The show was produced by Canadian animation company, Nelvana, whom at the time had also produced some of its first television series: Inspector Gadget (with DIC), 20 Minute Workout and The Edison Twins. A total of 13 episodes were produced. The original scripts were later re-used to produce the same 13 episodes in French, using different Quebecois actors, as a show titled M. Micropuce. All 26 episodes were produced during Summer 1982 throughout Autumn 1984.

The series was created by Skip Lumley and Michael Hirsh, produced by Nelvana and Ventura Pictures and directed by Peter Jennings. Most of the computer hardware, software and electronics in the show were donated by various companies, looking to promote their products at the time.

To date, the show has not been released on home video nor DVD.

== Synopsis ==
The show mainly aimed at school students aged 9 to 15, and designed to teach children basic knowledge about computers. It featured Skip Lumley, an adult computer consultant, and his two neighbours, 12-year-old Stevie Grosfield and his 10-year-old sister Dayna Simon. Visiting Skip's workshop, Stevie and Dayna learned about computers through hands-on demonstrations and clear, analogy-filled explanations. The three were accompanied by an artificial intelligence fantasy computer named Lumley and a robot called Hero.

=== Episodes (1982-84) ===
Episode 1 - "Information please"
Episode 2 - "Bits of programming"
Episode 3 - "Memory is made of this"
Episode 4 - "The computer has a code"
Episode 5 - "Problems, problems, problems"
Episode 6 - "You can count on computers"
Episode 7 - "Flights of fancy"
Episode 8 - "A pixel is worth a thousand words"
Episode 9 - "Music on key"
Episode 10 - "Does that compute?"
Episode 11 - "Games computers play"
Episode 12 - "Ask the teacher"
Episode 13 - "Computers don't do windows"

== See also ==
- The Edison Twins, Nelvana's first live-action series.
- Bill Nye the Science Guy
- Beakman's World
- The Screen Savers
