= Beyond Human (TV series) =

- Country of origin: Canada
- Original language: English
- No. of seasons: 1
- No. of episodes: 13

Production
- Running time: 22 minutes

Original release
- Network: Teletoon; The History Channel
- Release: September 9, 2011

Beyond Human is an original TV documentary series that previously aired on Teletoon's Super Fan Friday. The show features people who can do amazing things.
