= The Wonderfully Weird World of Gumball season 2 =

Season of television series

The Wonderfully Weird World of Gumball
- Season 2
- Release poster
- No. of episodes: 20

Release
- Original network: Hulu
- Original release: December 22, 2025

Season chronology
- ← Previous; Season 1 Next → Season 3

The second season of the British-American animated television sitcom The Wonderfully Weird World of Gumball, which was created by Ben Bocquelet, was released on Hulu in the United States on 22 December 2025, and was produced by Hanna-Barbera Studios Europe. (Note: Originally called Cartoon Network Development Studio Europe.) Serving as a revival to the original series, it focuses on the misadventures of Gumball Watterson, a blue twelve-year-old cat, along with his adopted brother, Darwin, a goldfish. Together, they cause mischief among their family, as well as with the wide array of students at Elmore Junior High, where they attend middle school.

== Development ==
=== Plot ===
Similar to the original series, it focuses on the misadventures of Gumball Watterson, a blue 12-year-old cat, along with his adopted brother, Darwin, a goldfish. Together, they cause mischief among their family, as well as with the wide array of students at Elmore Junior High, where they attend middle school. In a behind-the-scenes video documenting the production of the previous show's second season, creator Ben Bocquelet expanded on the development of some of the characters, and how they are based on interactions from his childhood.

=== Production ===
On 17 October 2025, London-based recording studio Fuse Post confirmed that post-production audio mixing on the final 20 episodes was completed. On 19 November 2025, Hulu announced that the second season would premiere in the United States on 22 December 2025, followed by an international release on Cartoon Network and HBO Max on 2 February 2026. The 20 episodes were originally produced to complete a 40-episode order for the first season, but network executives split the order into two seasons without notifying the production staff prior to the announcement.

The season features "The Cheapmas", the series' second dedicated Christmas special, which debuted 13 years after "Christmas" (2012) from The Amazing World of Gumball. Series creator Ben Bocquelet and co-showrunner Erik Fountain designed the episode to subvert holiday tropes by focusing on corporate commercialism and high prices. To depict a high-speed police chase through Elmore, the animators combined pre-existing assets with newly built 3D sets, and included a brief cameo appearance by Jake the Dog from Adventure Time. A haunted doll character was created to satisfy a network legal requirement prohibiting child characters from stealing or driving a vehicle. The season finale, "The Rewrite", was written to resolve the cliffhanger from the sixth-season finale of The Amazing World of Gumball, "The Inquisition".

== Episodes ==
No. overall	No. in season	Title	Written by	Storyboarded by	Hulu release date	U.K. air date	Prod. code
261	1	"The Summoning"	Bryan Caselli, Michele Cavin, Jessica Combs, Matt Layzell, Todd Michael McClintock & Tobi Wilson	Julien Thompson	December 22, 2025	16 October 2026	GB725
Masami, Teri and Clare start a witch coven to steal positions for the yearbook club and recruit Darwin after discovering his love and empathy have magic in them. However, Masami gets too carried away at seeking revenge for her embarrassing photo from last year's yearbook.
262	2	"The Unfollow"	Bryan Caselli, Jessica Combs, Kate Davies, Matt Layzell, Todd Michael McClintock & Ben Bocquelet	Jawed Boudaoud	December 22, 2025	2 February 2026	GB731
When Gumball and Darwin discover Sarah is no longer interested in them and has moved on to a new idol, they try everything to win her back.
263	3	"The Promposal"	Bryan Caselli, Jessica Combs, Matt Layzell, Todd Michael McClintock, Jessica Silcock, Naomi Smith, Tobi Wilson & Ben Bocquelet	Jawed Boudaoud	December 22, 2025	3 February 2026	GB720
When Penny becomes nervous of asking Gumball out to prom, she goes to the extreme to fulfil his expectations of a huge, crazy and special romantic gesture.
264	4	"The Trumpet"	George Gendi, Matt Layzell & Michele Cavin	Melanie Lopez	December 22, 2025	4 February 2026	GB714
When Nicole buys Gumball a trumpet in order for him to start doing something productive with his life, the latter is carried away into thinking he is a musical genius.
265	5	"The Synthesis"	Shane McCarthy & Ben Bocquelet	Matt Layzell	December 22, 2025	5 February 2026	GB739
When Anais and Masami start feeling embarrassed of their mothers at the school's career day, Nicole and Yuki team up to impress them but go way too far.
266	6	"The Cheapmas"	Bryan Caselli, Ruby Clyde, Jessica Combs, Kate Davies, Matt Layzell, Todd Michael McClintock, Rachel WD & Ben Bocquelet	Melanie Lopez	December 22, 2025	TBA	GB733
When commercialism, high prices, and holiday chaos ruin their Christmas cheer, Gumball and Darwin buy knockoff gifts from Shady Man to distribute to their neighbors. Their plan escalates into a police chase through Elmore with a haunted doll at the wheel.
267	7	"The Score"	Bryan Caselli, Ruby Clyde, Jessica Combs, Kate Davies, Matt Layzell, Todd Michael McClintock, Rachel WD & Ben Bocquelet	Jawed Boudaoud	December 22, 2025	6 February 2026	GB728
When Gumball and Darwin try to help Ocho with his anger issues, they discover that his life is a literal video game and is harder than it seems.
268	8	"The Diary"	Bryan Caselli, Michele Cavin, Jessica Combs, Matt Layzell & Todd Michael McClintock	Bianca Ansems	December 22, 2025	9 February 2026	GB726
When Gumball and Darwin find pieces of paper from a diary and assume it's from Clare, they play matchmaker to reunite a broken relationship.
269	9	"The Punishment"	Ruby Clyde, Jessica Combs, Matt Layzell, Rachel WD, Tobi Wilson & Ben Bocquelet	Aurelie Charbonnier	December 22, 2025	10 February 2026	GB732
When Gumball and Nicole are sentenced to summer school for their constant arguing and bickering, the two discover it's all just a ruse and decide to play along.
270	10	"The Roast"	Bryan Caselli, Ruby Clyde, Jessica Combs, Kate Davies, Matt Layzell, Todd Michael McClintock, Rachel WD, Tobi Wilson & Ben Bocquelet	Julien Thompson	December 22, 2025	11 February 2026	GB729
After one of Gumball's roasts on Alan goes too far and lands him in big trouble, he decides never to remark on anyone's flaws again.
271	11	"The Survivalists"	George Gendi, Tobi Wilson & Ben Bocquelet	Melanie Lopez	December 22, 2025	TBA	GB719
When Gumball and Darwin bet they can stay outside in the wilderness with no clothes or food, it soon backfires and they quickly regret it after learning that nature isn't a safe place.
272	12	"The Labels"	Bryan Caselli, Ruby Clyde, Jessica Combs, Matt Layzell, Todd Michael McClintock, Rachel WD, Tobi Wilson & Ben Bocquelet	Julien Thompson	December 22, 2025	TBA	GB734
When a new guidance counselor replaces Mr. Small and starts posting name tags on people based on their distinctive personality, Gumball and Darwin try to put a stop to it.
273	13	"The Fools"	Bryan Caselli, Michele Cavin, Ruby Clyde, Jessica Combs, Kate Davies, Matt Layzell, Todd Michael McClintock & Rachel WD	Jawed Boudaoud	December 22, 2025	TBA	GB736
When Gumball discovers that no one is celebrating April Fools' Day, he goes too far with his pranks and soon has the entire town rioting against him.
274	14	"The Homework"	Bryan Caselli, Jessica Combs, Matt Layzell, Todd Michael McClintock & Ben Bocquelet	Julien Thompson	December 22, 2025	TBA	GB722
When Anais forgets her homework back at home, a sick Gumball is forced to return it to her through harsh conditions that leave him questioning why's he doing it.
275	15	"The Sonder"	Bryan Caselli, Michele Cavin, Ruby Clyde, Jessica Combs, Kate Davies, Matt Layzell, Todd Michael McClintock & Rachel WD	Matt Layzell	December 22, 2025	TBA	GB740
When Gumball questions the point of minor characters, Darwin tries to show him the difference between thinking about yourself versus thinking about others, and that they might have sad and depressing backstories too.
276	16	"The Mister"	Bryan Caselli, Michele Cavin, Ruby Clyde, Jessica Combs, Matt Layzell, Todd Michael McClintock, Rachel WD & Tobi Wilson	Bianca Ansems	December 22, 2025	TBA	GB738
When Idaho becomes a man, Gumball and Darwin decide to help navigate him through the trials of adulthood, but soon discover that adults think like kids too.
277	17	"The Tracking"	Ruby Clyde, Rachel WD & Ben Bocquelet	Matt Layzell	December 22, 2025	TBA	GB741
When Richard accepts Harold's bet of using a fitness tracker to help him lose weight, his family is forced to help him accomplish his goal, or else they also suffer from the consequences of the bet.
278	18	"The Pants"	Michele Cavin, Ruby Clyde, Jessica Combs, Kate Davies & Rachel WD	Melanie Lopez	December 22, 2025	TBA	GB737
A terrified Gumball is unable to cope with the fact that Banana Joe is now wearing pants, and does everything to convince him to take them off.
279	19	"The Necroprancer"	Bryan Caselli, Jessica Combs, Matt Layzell, Shane McCarthy, Todd Michael McClintock, Tobi Wilson & Ben Bocquelet	Bianca Ansems	December 22, 2025	TBA	GB735
When Gumball is tired of letting Carrie use his body for her dates with Darwin, the three enter the Underworld to find Carrie a permanent body.
280	20	"The Rewrite"	Ruby Clyde, Rachel WD & Ben Bocquelet	Oliver Hamilton	December 22, 2025	2 February 2026	GB742
Following the events of "The Inquisition", Rob was rescued from the Void by the Awesome Store's shopkeeper and tries to rewrite the episode's plot to stop Gumball and Darwin from figuring out the truth behind the franchise's strange continuity and 7-year gap. However, due to a Standards and Practices issue, Rob and Gumball's reencounter was cut short, as the former falls back into the Void but is rescued by a "post-credits scene" where the shopkeeper decides to retire and hands the store over to Rob, as he begins his quest to save Elmore from the Void.

== Reception ==
Unlike the first season, this season received more positive reviews from critics. Johnny Loftus from Decider states that "The Wonderfully Weird World of Gumball keeps staying positive and stirring up the good time-y goofs in its second season since spinning off from Amazing World of Gumball." Tessa Smith of Mama's Geeky also gave the season a positive review, stating that the season "continues to deliver wacky, bizarre, and truly fun episodes."

Joshua Mbonu from The Cosmic Circus also stated that the second season "continues to carry on with what works so well about this series while playing with new concepts and jokes." John Witw of Bubbleblabber.com gave the season an 8.5 out of 10, stating that while "the show's self-aware humor could occasionally be a bit much, the season also proves it can even poke fun at itself just as much as classic tropes."
