= List of programs broadcast by Treehouse TV =

Treehouse's current logo, used since April 8, 2013

This is a list of programs broadcast by Treehouse TV, a Canadian television channel for preschoolers launched on November 1, 1997. It is owned by Corus Entertainment (formerly owned by Shaw Communications), airing both live-action and animated programs.

== Current programming ==
As of August 2026:

- ^{1} Ended but still airing in reruns.

=== Original programming ===
==== Animated series ====
| Title | Premiere date | Current season | Source(s) |
|---|---|---|---|
| Builder Brothers Dream Factory | March 26, 2023 | 1 | |
| Hamsters of Hamsterdale | December 2024 | 1 | |
| Rubble & Crew | February 4, 2023 | 4 | |
| Vida the Vet | October 14, 2023 | 2 | |

==== Reruns ====
| Title | Premiere date | Finale date(s) | Date(s) rerun | Source(s) |
|---|---|---|---|---|
| Agent Binky: Pets of the Universe^{1} | September 7, 2019 | March 31, 2024 | 2024–present | |
| Barney's World^{1} | October 14, 2024 | November 3, 2025 | 2025-present | |
| Corn & Peg^{1} | March 4, 2019 | October 8, 2020 | N/A | |
| The Dog and Pony Show^{1} | September 5, 2020 | 2020 | 2020–21 | |
| Esme & Roy^{1} | August 18, 2018 | February 4, 2021 | N/A | |
| Maggie and the Ferocious Beast^{1} | August 26, 2000 | June 9, 2002 | 2005-10 | |
| Max & Ruby^{1} | May 3, 2002 | April 9, 2020 | 2020–present | |
| Ranger Rob^{1} | September 5, 2016 | June 13, 2021 | 2021–24 | |
| Snowsnaps^{1} | September 1, 2018 | November 25, 2018 | 2018–20; 2020-22 | |
| Top Wing^{1} | November 6, 2017 | July 2, 2020 | N/A | |

=== Acquired programming ===
==== Animated series ====
| Title | Premiere date | Source(s) |
|---|---|---|
| Batwheels | October 22, 2022 | |
| Ben & Holly's Little Kingdom^{1} | October 24, 2016 | |
| Bugs Bunny Builders^{1} | September 11, 2022 | |
| Gabby's Dollhouse | October 15, 2022 | |
| Paw Patrol | 2022 | Licensed from TVOKids |
| Peppa Pig | March 10, 2011 | |
| Sesame Street: Mecha Builders^{1} | May 15, 2022 | |
| Strawberry Shortcake: Berry in the Big City | April 6, 2026 | |
| Thomas & Friends: All Engines Go^{1} | September 18, 2021 | |

==== Live-action series ====
| Title | Premiere date | Source(s) |
|---|---|---|
| Sesame Street | September 6, 2008 | |
| The Wiggles | September 2, 2003 | |

== Upcoming programming ==
=== Original programming ===
==== Animated series ====
| Title | Premiere date | Source(s) |
|---|---|---|
| Leela's Island | | |

=== Acquired programming ===
==== Animated series ====
| Title | Premiere date | Source(s) |

== Former programming ==
=== Original programming ===
==== Animated series ====
| Title | Premiere date | Finale date(s) | Date(s) rerun | Source(s) |
|---|---|---|---|---|
| Caillou | September 7, 2009 | October 3, 2017 | N/A | |
| Dinopaws | June 2014 | 2017 | N/A | |
| Dragon | September 6, 2004 | April 6, 2013 | N/A | |
| Farzzle's World | September 6, 2004 | February 19, 2010 | N/A | |
| Franklin | May 24, 2004 | May 2015 | N/A | |
| Guess with Jess | December 15, 2009 | December 2013 | 2015 – September 1, 2017 | |
| Harry and His Bucket Full of Dinosaurs | July 3, 2007 | September 1, 2017 | May – August 2020 | |
| Little Charmers | January 31, 2015 | May 26, 2019 | 2019–2022 | |
| Miss Spider's Sunny Patch Friends | March 7, 2006 | September 4, 2011 | N/A | |
| Mole Sisters | February 5, 2003 | April 17, 2011 | N/A | |
| My Big Big Friend | September 5, 2011 | September 24, 2018 | N/A | |
| My Friend Rabbit | February 25, 2008 | September 3, 2011 | N/A | |
| Pikwik Pack | November 7, 2020 | November 1, 2021 | 2021–22 | |
| Pirates! | 1999 | 2001 | N/A | |
| Pumper Pups | September 6, 2000 | February 6, 2005 | N/A | |
| Ranger Rob | September 5, 2016 | June 13 2021 | 2021– January 2024 | |
| Toon Bops | September 2020 | 2023 | N/A | |
| Toopy and Binoo | September 5, 2005 | October 17, 2018 | N/A | |
| Toot & Puddle | September 2, 2008 | July 31, 2011 | N/A | |
| Trucktown | September 6, 2014 | August 30, 2020 | N/A | |
| Waybuloo | September 8, 2009 | September 2, 2012 | July 2014 – March 2015 | |
| Zigby | February 23, 2009 | July 31, 2011 | June 2013 – May 2015 | |

==== Live-action series ====
| Title | Premiere date | Finale date(s) | Date(s) rerun | Source(s) |
|---|---|---|---|---|
| Ants in Your Pants | November 1, 1997 | 2000 | 2000–February 4, 2008 | |
| Crazy Quilt | November 1, 1997 | 2000 | 2000–February 27, 2011 | |
| Treetown | November 1, 1997 | 2000 | 2000–February 27, 2011 | |
| Grandma, Look What I Found! | January 29, 2001 | February 2006 | N/A | |
| The Big Comfy Couch | September 4, 2000 | August 31, 2014 | N/A | |
| The Toy Castle | September 4, 2000 | August 30, 2009 | N/A | |
| Wee 3 | January 30, 2001 | 2002 | 2002–February 27, 2011 | |
| Wumpa's World | September 3, 2001 | February 3, 2006 | N/A | |
| Tipi Tales | February 7, 2003 | September 6, 2009 | N/A | |
| The Bittles | September 1, 2003 | October 5, 2008 | N/A | |
| 4 Square | February 9, 2004 | September 6, 2015 | N/A | |
| This Is Daniel Cook. | September 6, 2004 | August 28, 2011 | N/A | |
| Roll Play | January 13, 2006 | March 16, 2015 | N/A | |
| This Is Emily Yeung. | September 4, 2006 | October 22, 2015 | N/A | |
| Are We There Yet?: World Adventure | September 3, 2007 | October 27, 2011 | 2013–2016 | |
| Big & Small | February 23, 2009 | July 31, 2011 | November 2012 – August 30, 2013 | |
| Sing, Dance and Play with Bobs and LoLo | May 2013 | 2016 | N/A | |
| This is Scarlett & Isaiah | September 2013 | 2017 | N/A | |
| Toopy and Binoo Vroom Vroom Zoom | April 7, 2013 | July 13, 2017 | N/A | |

=== Acquired programming ===
==== Animated series ====
- 3rd & Bird (September 7, 2009 – August 2013)
- 44 Cats (September 30, 2019 – November 2020)
- Abby's Flying Fairy School (2018–2019)
- The Adventures of Chuck and Friends (January 3, 2011 – August 2012)
- Amazing Animals (February 13, 2005 – February 22, 2008)
- Anatole (February 4, 2003 – February 3, 2005)
- Angelina Ballerina (September 11, 2002 – September 5, 2009)
- Angelina Ballerina: The Next Steps (September 7, 2009 – March 2, 2014)
- Animal Stories (September 4, 2000 – March 29, 2004)
- Archibald the Koala (September 7, 2001 – September 6, 2002)
- Babar (February 2, 2003 – March 2022)
- Babar and the Adventures of Badou (February 2011 – 2015; July 26, 2021)
- Barbie Dreamtopia (2018 – 2023)
- The Berenstain Bears (January 2003 – August 2006; February 2007 – July 2009; July – November 2022)
- Bert and Ernie's Great Adventures (September 2, 2008 – August 30, 2013)
- Big Sister, Little Brother (September 4 – October 11, 2000)
- Bob the Builder (September 3, 2001 – February 2014)
- Boblins (September 2006 – September 5, 2009)
- Brambly Hedge (2001–2004; sporadically)
- Butterbean's Café (January 5, 2019 – November, 2020)
- Care Bears (1999 – September 2, 2001; September 3, 2007 – 2008)
- Care Bears: Welcome to Care-a-Lot (September 8, 2012 – August 2014)
- Chomp Squad (2018–2019)
- Chuggington (February 28, 2009 – 2015)
- Clangers (January 8, 2016 – September 1, 2017; 2019)
- Cleo & Cuquin (April 5, 2019 – 2022)
- Corduroy (February 4, 2002 – January 2007)
- Deer Squad (March 21, 2021 – 2021)
- Dino Babies (November 1, 1997 – 1999)
- Dorothy and the Wizard of Oz (June 2, 2018 – 2022)
- Enchanted Lands: Tales from the Faraway Tree (September 4, 2001 – August 28, 2003)
- Enchantimals (2018–2019) (animated)
- Faeries (2001–2004; sporadically)
- Fennec (September 1998 – 1999)
- Fifi and the Flowertots (February 25, 2008 – December 31, 2010)
- Fireman Sam (September 2011 – December 2013)
- The Forgotten Toys (2001–2002)
- Franklin and Friends (March 4, 2011)
- George Shrinks (February 5, 2002 – January 31, 2003)
- Go Jetters (2016–2017)
- Happy Ness: The Secret of the Loch (November 1, 1997 – 1999)
- Hello Kitty and Friends (November 1, 1997 – February 1, 2004)
- Hey Duggee (January 2016 – 2018; 2019)
- It's Itsy Bitsy Time! (1999 – August 29, 2003)
- Jane and the Dragon (September 2, 2016 – Summer 2016)
- Jellabies (September 3, 2001 – May 16, 2004)
- Keroppi and Friends (November 1, 1997 – April 2002; June – August 2002)
- Kipper (September 4, 2001 – August 28, 2003)
- Kleo the Misfit Unicorn (September 12, 2002 – January 30, 2003; September 2, 2003 – August 31, 2006)
- The Koala Brothers (February 25, 2008 – January 2, 2011)
- Lalaloopsy (2013 – August 30, 2014)
- The Land Before Time (September 2007 – 2008)
- Little Bear (September 7, 1998 – August 28, 2010)
- Little Grey Rabbit (September 4, 2001 – February 2, 2003; September 1, 2003 – May 16, 2004)
- Little People (July 14, 2006 – June 15, 2007; April 1, 2011-December 30, 2012)
- Little Ellen (October 1, 2021 – 2025)
- Littlest Pet Shop: A World of Our Own (2018–2019)
- Madeline (February 4, 2003 – June 19, 2005)
- The Magic Key (September 9, 2002 – August 26, 2003; April 26 – May 7, 2004) (live action and animated)
- Maisy (September 6, 2001 – April 2003)
- Masha and the Bear (April 15, 2016 – 2020)
- Masha's Spooky Stories (February 15, 2018 – May 5, 2019)
- Masha's Tales (October 21, 2017 – May 5, 2019)
- Miffy and Friends (April 2003 – March 15, 2009)
- Mike the Knight
- Molang (July 6, 2020 – 2022)
- My Little Pony: Friendship Is Magic (January 11, 2011 – 2022)
- My Little Pony: Pony Life (June 21, 2020 – 2022)
- Noddy in Toyland (September 7, 2009 – August 2012)
- Nouky and Friends (June 2008 – February 21, 2010)
- The Octonauts (March 30, 2012 – July 1, 2020)
- Odd-Jobbers (September 1, 2008 – December 31, 2010)
- Olivia (February 23, 2009 – August 2012)
- Pablo the Little Red Fox (September 3, 2001 – May 16, 2004; February – August 2005)
- Peg + Cat (March 2014 – 2020)
- Percy the Park Keeper (2001–2004; sporadically)
- Peter Rabbit (2013–2016; 2021–2022)
- Pocket Dragon Adventures (February 2000 – August 31, 2001)
- Pocoyo (September 5, 2005 – February 21, 2010)
- Postman Pat (September 6, 2001 – January 30, 2003; March 1, 2009 – July 31, 2011)
- Rainbow Rangers (October 15, 2019 – 2021)
- Ricky Zoom (October 5, 2019 – 2021)
- Roary the Racing Car (April 26, 2009 – February 2012)
- Robocar Poli (January 6, 2018 – 2021)
- Rolie Polie Olie (February 6, 2006 – February 22, 2009; September 6, 2010 – August 2012)
- Rubbadubbers (September 1, 2003 – September 1, 2006)
- Rusty Rivets (January 16, 2017 – May 8, 2020; August 2020 – January 2, 2022)
- Seven Little Monsters (February 4, 2001 – February 3, 2002)
- Spider! (September 3, 2001 – August 31, 2003)
- Spot the Dog (September 3, 2001 – August 30, 2003) (live action and animated)
- Super BOOMi (May 19, 2019 – 2022)
- Super Wings (March 3, 2015 – 2020)
- Ted Sieger's Wildlife (September 3, 2001 – March 29, 2004) (live-action and animated)
- Thomas & Friends (September 1, 2003 – 2022)
- Timmy Time (September 7, 2009 – 2011)
- Timothy Goes to School (February 6, 2002 – February 24, 2008)
- Transformers: Rescue Bots Academy (October 27, 2019 – 2021)
- Turtle Island (September 5, 2000 – January 28, 2001)
- Waybuloo (September 8, 2009 – September 8, 2012; July 6, 2014 – March 22, 2015)
- The World of Peter Rabbit and Friends (2001 – 2004; sporadically)
- The WotWots (February 22, 2010 – March 7, 2014) (live action and animated)
- Wow! Wow! Wubbzy! (April 26, 2008 – May 30, 2009)
- YooHoo to the Rescue (November 5, 2021 – 2023)
- Zack & Quack (March 1, 2014 – August 30, 2017)

==== Live-action series ====
- 3, 2, 1 Let's Go! (September 8, 2010 – August 28, 2013)
- The Adventures of Dudley the Dragon (September 9, 2002 – September 3, 2005)
- Barney & Friends (November 1, 1997 – August 16, 2012)
- Bear in the Big Blue House (September 1998 – January 26, 2001; September 3, 2001 – September 1, 2006)
- Beezoo's Attic (February 1999 – September 3, 2000)
- Boohbah (April 26, 2004 – February 3, 2006) (live action and animated)
- Bookmice (November 1, 1997 – 1999)
- Elmo: The Musical (2013–2016)
- Elmo's World (November 8, 2005 – August 29, 2013)
- Global Grover (November 7, 2005 – August 30, 2013)
- Hallo Spencer (November 1, 1997 – 1998)
- Igloo-Gloo (February 2, 2004 – February 3, 2006)
- In the Night Garden... (February 25, 2008 – February 24, 2012)
- Iris, The Happy Professor (November 1, 1997 – August 29, 2003) (live action and animated)
- Lamb Chop's Play-Along (November 1, 1997 – 1999)
- Little Big Kid (October 12, 2000 – September 1, 2001)
- Little Star (November 1, 1997 – February 2, 2003) (live action and animated)
- Mighty Machines (February 7, 2004 – February 22, 2009)
- Mister Maker (February 26, 2008 – January 28, 2012)
- Mopatop's Shop (September 3, 2001 – September 6, 2002)
- Ni Ni's Treehouse (January 29, 2001 – August 31, 2003) (live action and animated)
- The Not-Too-Late Show with Elmo (September 5, 2020)
- Once Upon a Hamster (September 14, 2002 – January 31, 2004)
- Open Sesame (September 1998 – September 2, 2001)
- PJ Katie's Farm (1999)
- Play with Me Sesame (November 7, 2005 – August 30, 2013)
- Potamus Park (November 1, 1997 – 1998)
- Rimba's Island (November 1, 1997 – 1999)
- Ryan's Mystery Playdate (July 6, 2019 – 2022)
- St. Bear's Dolls Hospital (September 1998 – September 3, 2000)
- Teletubbies (January 1999 – August 31, 2001)
- Today's Special (November 1, 1997 – September 2000) (live action and animated)
- Tots TV (November 1, 1997 – September 1999)
- Wimzie's House (January 29, 2001 – September 2, 2005)
- Yo Gabba Gabba! (February 25, 2008 – March 1, 2015)
- Zoboomafoo (February 1999 – August 31, 2003) (live action and animated)

=== Programming from Nickelodeon ===
- ^{2} Final programming of Nickelodeon before they were removed from Treehouse TV on September 1, 2025 due to financial pressure from Corus Entertainment.

| Title | Premiere date | Finale date(s) | Date(s) rerun | Source(s) |
|---|---|---|---|---|
| The Backyardigans | October 11, 2004 | March 2022 | | |
| Blue's Clues | February 1999 | September 2007 | | |
| Blue's Room | September 10, 2005 | December 20, 2008 | | |
| Dora and Friends: Into the City! | September 6, 2014 | 2017 | | |
| Dora the Explorer | February 4, 2002 | August 29, 2022 | | |
| The Fresh Beat Band | January 8, 2010 | September 6, 2015 | | |
| Go, Diego, Go! | September 7, 2005 | August 30, 2020 | | |
| Nella the Princess Knight | May 6, 2017 | August 30, 2020 | | |
| Ni Hao, Kai-Lan | February 26, 2008 | September 2017 | | |
| Oswald | September 9, 2002 | August 28, 2006 | | |
| Santiago of the Seas | November 7, 2020 | 2023 | | |
| Shimmer and Shine | October 3, 2015 | August 30, 2020 | | |
| Sunny Day | September 4, 2017 | 2019 | | |
| Team Umizoomi | March 6, 2010 | 2016 | | |
| Wonder Pets! | September 4, 2006 | September 2017 | | |
| Baby Shark's Big Show! ^{2} | March 28, 2021 | September 1, 2025 | | |
| Blaze and the Monster Machines ^{2} | March 17, 2015 | September 1, 2025 | | |
| Blue's Clues & You! ^{2} | November 11, 2019 | September 1, 2025 | | |
| Bossy Bear ^{2} | September 8, 2023 | September 1, 2025 | | |
| Bubble Guppies ^{2} | September 5, 2011 | September 1, 2025 | | |

=== Short-form programming ===
==== Live-action series ====
| Title | Premiere date | Finale date(s) | Date(s) rerun | Source(s) |
|---|---|---|---|---|
| Ask Me! | August 30, 2004 | 2017 | | |
| Funny Farm | September 1998 | September 1, 2001 | | |
| I Can Do It! | January 31, 2000 | August 29, 2004 | | |
| Judy & David's Boombox | September 1, 2002 | September 4, 2005 | December 12, 2005 – September 3, 2010 | |
| Land O' Hands | January 29, 2001 | August 29, 2004 | February – December 2005 | |
| My Special Book | September 4, 2000 | August 31, 2002 | March 18, 2004 – September 16, 2006; October 1 – December 24, 2007 | |
| Osbert & Cush | April 2003 | March 9, 2008 | | |
| Pet Squad | August 2000 | February 2006 | N/A | |
| Wanna Play? | September 4, 2000 | August 29, 2004 | April – August 2005 | |
| Wildlife | 2001 | 2003 | | |

==== Animated series ====
| Title | Premiere date | Finale date(s) | Date(s) rerun | Source(s) |
|---|---|---|---|---|
| Deko Boko Friends | September 5, 2005 | August 31, 2008 | | |
| Funky Valley | September 6, 2004 | June 30, 2010 | | |
| Grandpa's Garden | September 8, 2004 | September 11, 2008 | | |
| Max the Cat | September 3, 2001 | August 2006 | | |
| Tama and Friends | 2001 | 2002 | | |
| Tiny Tukkins | November 19, 2019 | 2020 | | |
| Tobi! | 2010 | | | |
