= Kleo the Misfit Unicorn =

- DVD Cover
- Created by: Gordon Stanfield
- Starring: Saffron Henderson; Mickey Rooney; David Kaye; Nigel Williams; Mike Scannell
- Country of origin: Canada
- No. of episodes: 26

Production
- Executive producers: Gordon Stanfield; Charles R. Allard
- Running time: 30 minutes
- Production companies: Stanfield Productions; Western International Communications

Original release
- Network: Family; Radio-Canada; Treehouse TV; TVO Kids
- Release: 1997

Kleo the Misfit Unicorn is a Canadian children's animated television series. A television pilot episode for the series aired in 1997, and Kleo the Misfit Unicorn became a regular series in 1998.

== Plot ==
The series takes place in the fictional world of Misfit Land, populated by 'misfits', an eclectic group of characters notable for their unique traits that distinguish them from other members of their species. Kleo is a unicorn charged with aiding those who accidentally arrive in Misfit Land in returning to their home worlds.

== Characters ==
=== Misfit Land (Ir)Regulars ===
These are the key misfits who have chosen to stay in Misfit Land indefinitely. They each represent a different aspect of what it can mean to be a misfit.

Kleopatra "Kleo" (The Misfit Unicorn)
The only winged unicorn in existence. She is the star of the show, sent from the unicorn home world of ZaZma on a special mission: to aid the departure of those who arrive in Misfit Land, but don't really belong there. She is the misfits' leader, and she becomes more assured in her role.

Slim (The Striped Hippo)
Slim talks pretty tough, with his gruff, Texan accent, but underneath the bluster, he's about as together as Yugoslavia. His inside often comes outside in moments of crisis. Nevertheless, no matter what his mood, he's always ready to help a friend, or a stranger, for that matter, and when it comes down to the crunch, his size and brute strength can come in handy.

Henry (The walking fish)
An upper-class English eccentric in the form of a fish that walks and lives in a tree. Henry considers misfitdom to be an exalted state, a cut above the common. In fact, he feels a snobbish, patrician pity for those poor souls who must "languish in conformity". Henry is supremely self-assured, and he (almost) always justifies that assurance, with grace and style to boot.

The Wannabee (The Shapeshifting Bee)
Convinced that "Nobody except beekeepers likes beez", The Bumbling Wannabee has, through the force of sheer insecurity, somehow achieved a chameleon-like ability to shape and voice-shift to whomever he's buzzing around at the time. Unfortunately, the impression is never perfect—no matter who he's imitating, he can't quite hide his wings, and his eyes alway stay a bit buggy. Also, whatever accent he puts on, there's a little bit of a buzz to it that he can't disguise. Things often go wrong around the Wannabee because he's too eager to please, and much too easily led, but no one ever doubts his good (though usually misguided) intentions.

Lyle (The unfierce Dragon)
Imagine the most horrifying reptilian monstrosity you've ever seen. Now imagine it wearing an apron and a friendly smile, offering you a fresh-made batch of chocolate chip cookies. Lyle is huge, with great, big, sharp teeth and impenetrable scales, but he's as unfierce as they come. He enjoys decorating his lair, and prefers to use his fiery breath for low-level convection, rather than crisping maidens, etc. Other dragons shun him for his friendly, tame ways, but that doesn't bother Lyle. He has plenty of friends in Misfit Land. He doesn't appear in every episode, just a few here and there.

Jazz Cat (The color changing Cat)
Jazz Cat plays cool smooth jazz as his colors change softly.

=== Unicorns ===
- Kleo's mother
- Kleo's father
- Justin (Strong)
- Tara (Swift)
- Macy (Skeptic)
- Felto (Teaser)
- Talbut - The bearded boss unicorn

=== Misfit Visitors ===
- George
- Marcus
- Emily
- Rosie
- Gong Li
- Thomas Edison
- Jenny
- William Shakespeare
- Sami the seal
- Sabrina the Snake
- Ena the Hyena
- Hilda the Raccoon
- Margery the Cheetah
- Jubilee Dancer the Racehorse
- Maggie the Magpie

== Episode list ==
No.	Title	Original release date
1	"Someday I'll Fly"	TBA
Kleo, afraid to fly, meets a young boy named George who is afraid of water. Together they learn to overcome their fears.
2	"Dragon Catcher"	TBA
Kleo is summoned by Justin to help Marcus, a knight in training with a compassionate heart. When Marcus refuses to catch a fox, the other squires mistake this for cowardice and make fun of him, causing Marcus to vow not to return until he catches a dragon. Kleo has a dragon in Misfit Land pretend to be captured by Marcus to prove his bravery.
3	"Chicken Girl"	TBA
Kleo helps a young cowgirl, "Rosie" with dreams of being a rodeo star. The local kids tease her because Rosie is a chicken farmer and they don't think chickens are cool.
4	"Misfit Artists"	TBA
Kleo helps two artists in Misfit Land. Jenny is losing pride in her work because of a critical teacher, while Senior Wavy is an eccentric artist with grandiose dreams. The misfits hold an art show to display Jenny’s paintings and restore her confidence, but the painting she made of her teacher comes alive and criticizes the paintings further. When Senior Wavy appears and steals the teacher’s painting, both artists learn a valuable lesson in being unique, while Jenny’s teacher learns to appreciate the fact that everyone sees art in a different way.
5	"Kleo to the Rescue"	TBA
Talbut has been kidnapped. Kleo embarks on a dangerous mission to save him from the Cyclops. Kleo helps Cyclops to stop bullying his friends and save Talbut.
6	"Perfect to a Fault"	TBA
Kleo meets Hilda, a neat-freak who lives in a garbage dump. Hilda ends up in Misfit Land and begins offering her services to those who don't want it.
7	"The Jester and the King"	TBA
Kleo travels to Marmalania and meets a Jester and a King. When the two switch places they learn that looking below the surface can reveal your true self.
8	"Thomas and Kleo"	TBA
Macy brings Kleo to meet a young Thomas Edison, who wants to give up inventing something for his school science fair because everyone looks down on him for constantly making mistakes. Kleo tries to help Thomas by having him invent something to help Slim, but when his inventions don't work, Thomas is discouraged, but he soon learns not to give up, and finally succeeds in inventing the lightbulb, winning the science fair and earning both his teacher’s approval and his classmates’ respect.
9	"Words of Wisdom"	TBA
Kleo travels to Elizabethan England and finds a young William Shakespeare. His mind is so full of ideas that they get out of hand. Kleo helps him learn to start one project at a time and finish it first before he stars another one.
10	"The Jade Carving"	TBA
Kleo goes back in time with Macy to the Ming Dynasty to help Gong Li a confused girl. She is asked by her grandfather, the master carver, to give a jade carving he made to the young lord, but Gong Li accidentally breaks the carving, and when the young lord arrives, she lies to him that her grandfather has it. Henry and Slim argue about how to fix the statue (with tools or Henry’s new invention), with each exaggerating the extent of his abilities to appear better than the other. However, they end up destroying the statue completely, and their fighting gets worse until Gong Li scolds them both for lying about their skills and telling them about the importance of honesty. This makes Kleo realize that the true purpose of the mission was not to fix the carving but to convince Gong Li to confess what happened to it. Gong Li realizes Kleo is right and tells the young lord the truth when he returns.
11	"The Emperor of Surtan"	TBA
A new misfit comes and wants to rule all of Misfit Land. He is actually the Emperors reflection from the garden pool and has convinced Kleo not to see Talbut.
12	"Jazz and Blues"	TBA
Sabrina is a very gifted musician but sometimes she boasts too much about her talent. She arrives in Misfit Land and has nothing good to say about their Talent Show.
13	"The Pride of Small Potatoes"	TBA
Jubilee Dancer, a racehorse, is being pressured by her owner Mrs. Piggot to become one of the fastest racehorses in the country like her older sister Golden Bound, but falls short of the mark and loses confidence in herself. Tara asks Kleo to help her, and the misfits attempt to train Jubilee through Slim’s new exercise routine, but nothing helps. Kleo then notices how gentle Jubilee is when giving rides, while Mrs. Piggot’s grandchildren are upset at not being able to ride Jubilee themselves, making Kleo realize that it is impossible for Jubilee to meet her sister’s standards. Kleo then helps Jubilee realize that she can become famous in her own way. Eventually Mrs. Piggot realizes this as well and decides to retire from horse racing and open a riding school with Jubilee as the training horse.
14	"Pot O' Gold"	TBA
Finnagan the Leprechaun arrives in Misfit Land in search of Gold. He also gives everyone else Gold Fever (except Kleo) and now they're all looking for gold.
15	"Daughter Nature"	TBA
The Earth is in trouble! Mother Nature is retiring and her daughter Dot would rather mess up everything than cleaning up pollution.
16	"For Whom the Bell Trolls"	TBA
Harold is made fun of by his friends because he looks different from the others but actually he's a troll he just doesn't know it yet.
17	"Maggie Magpie"	TBA
Kleo helps a misfit bird named Maggie Magpie who has a fondness for shiny objects. Kleo helps show Maggie that stealing is wrong.
18	"Ena the Hyena"	TBA
Ena the laughing Hyena likes to tell jokes but they are only funny to her. She comes to Misfit Land and the Misfits help her find a proper sense of humor.
19	"Marcia Chronicles"	TBA
A Martian named Marcia needs to send a message to Earth but needs Kleo's help. Slim, Henry and Wannabee think it's an Alien invasion and try to rescue Kleo.
20	"Seal of Approval"	TBA
It's Sports Day in Misfitland. Kleo and Sami the seal demonstrate their special talents but one is always in the spotlight.
21	"Billy Bigfoot"	TBA
Billy is a Bigfoot from BC. His little Sister Kimberly gets more attention than he does and he becomes angry and envious. Kimberly is caught by some Bigfoot trackers and Billy doesn't want to save her until Kleo melts his jealousy.
22	"Amazingly Frank"	TBA
Frank is a tiny flea who wants to join the Big Show Circus, but is unwanted. The Misfits help to perfect his act and now he must show the Circus master that he is ready.
23	"Mike the Magnificent"	TBA
Mike the Magnificent is Slim's hero. Mike gets amnesia. The Misfits help him remember who he is and Mike returns to again save the Universe.
24	"Waiting for Kleo"	TBA
Margery thinks she is the fastest cheetah. Her impatience comes crashing down on her as she gets herself and the Misfits into a sticky situation.
25	"The Tell-Tale Tail"	TBA
Conrad wins The Fastest Swinging Monkey Competition but only because he cheated. His tail is against him too and the Misfits try to teach Conrad to be a good sport.
26	"The Reindeer Herder's Daughter"	TBA
Emily doesn't understand the meaning of Christmas and wants all those toys for herself. Kleo takes Emily to see the children around the world who are waiting for the toys.
