= Do It for Yourself =

Canadian television home improvement series

- Created by: Initiative Production Ltd.
- Directed by: H. W. Pasila
- Presented by: Mary Bellows
- Starring: Mary Bellows
- Music by: Cam Shearer
- Country of origin: Canada
- Original language: English
- No. of seasons: 3
- No. of episodes: 278

Production
- Producer: J. Derek Smith
- Production location: Britannia, Ontario
- Editor: Barbara MacWhirter
- Running time: 30 minutes
- Production company: CBC Television

Original release
- Network: CBC
- Release: September 13, 1982 – November 1, 1985

Do It for Yourself is a Canadian television home improvement series hosted by Mary Bellows. It first premiered on CBC on September 13, 1982. The series ended on December 1, 1983 with 278 episodes. The program was one of the top run daytime shows in Canada and was sold in 1985 to a broadcast group which then aired the series on USA network, Lifetime and PBS in the United States.

== Cast ==
- Mary Bellows .... Host
- John Reeves .... Plant Expert
- Ken Reeves .... Plant Expert
- Zeke .... puppy No. 1
- Hoover .... puppy No. 2

== Book ==
In 1987, Bellows published a 64-page paperback book with all her handy tips and tricks from her home improvement TV show. The book was published in English by Methuem.
