= Spider! =

- Main title
- Genre: Musical; Children's television series
- Created by: Richard Warner
- Directed by: Graham Ralph
- Voices of: Jeff Stevenson; Casey Stevenson; Holly Stevenson
- Theme music composer: Rick Cassman
- Country of origin: United Kingdom
- Original language: English
- No. of series: 1
- No. of episodes: 13

Production
- Executive producers: Iain Harvey; Theresa Plummer-Andrews
- Producer: John Cary
- Editors: Paul Coppock; Karen Bruce
- Camera setup: Animated Opticals; Peter Jones Rostrums
- Running time: 5 minutes
- Production company: Hibbert Ralph Entertainment

Original release
- Network: BBC1 (Children's BBC)
- Release: 26 September – 30 December 1991

Spider is a 1991 British musical animated children's television mini-series made by Hibbert Ralph Entertainment for the BBC, that was originally aired on BBC One from 26 September to 30 December 1991. It followed the adventures of a grinning, accident-prone spider, the protagonist, and a young boy (although the boy was only present in eleven of the thirteen episodes), the boy starts off as initially frightened of Spider, but eventually befriends him by the events of episode 6.

The stories were told through song, and performed by Jeff Stevenson with his children, Casey and Holly, singing backing vocals. The styles of music featured in the episodes vary from rock 'n roll to haunting and melancholic tunes, and were produced by Rick Cassman at Triple X Studios. A BBC video entitled Spider! – I'm Only Scary 'cos I'm Hairy! (BBCV 4753), which contained all thirteen episodes, was also released in 1992. It was re-released on DVD in 2004.

== Reception ==
Spider was generally well received by critics and viewers, with praise directed to the series' simple animation, music, humour and multi-generational appeal. Several episodes have also been uploaded to video networking sites like YouTube and Veoh.

The series has been repeated on various children's television channels in the United Kingdom, such as CBeebies and Nick Jr. It was also dubbed into Scottish Gaelic as Damhan Allaidh and shown on BBC Two Scotland in the mornings. In the United States, the series was broadcast with American voice actors on Cartoon Network and repeated until 2000.

In Australia, the series was played on the ABC for two years from 1993 to 1994 and then on digital television on ABC2 from 2005 to 2006. In Namibia, the series was shown on NBC, and first aired on the network in 1992, as part of its lineup of children's programmes during the holidays.

In Canada, the series was broadcast on cable television on its networks for Knowledge Network in British Columbia and YTV (as part of YTV Jr.) in all states and territories and on digital television on BBC Kids. In New Zealand, the series aired on the defunct channel TVNZ 6 as part of Kidzone, a block for preschoolers. The series has also been sold to Hong Kong and was screened on ATV.

There were also two pop-up books, based on the first and tenth episodes, adapted from Richard Warner's original songs by Ron van der Meer and illustrated by the director Graham Ralph.

In May 2005, Silver Fox Films announced to develop a new, revived version of the series entitled Spider's Silly Show. The format was to be extended from five minutes to eleven minutes, and fifty two episodes were planned. It was to be presented by Andrew Sachs, who had previously narrated William's Wish Wellingtons for Hibbert Ralph Entertainment. No further announcements of the project appeared, and the revival was later canceled.

== Episodes ==
The first twelve episodes were all broadcast on BBC One as part of the Children's BBC strand on Thursdays at 3:50pm (a puppet spider named "Ninja" also joined Simon Parkin, Andi Peters and Edd the Duck in The Broom Cupboard during the original run), but the first programme of 21 November 1991 was Ready, Teddy, Go! (a lead up to the year's telethon of Pudsey), so the ninth episode was not transmitted until 28 November (the ninth episode of Ragdoll Productions' Brum was also not broadcast until that day as well).

The last Thursday of the year was 26 December, Boxing Day, so the thirteenth and final episode was not broadcast until four days thereafter, on Monday 30 December at 4:05pm.

In addition to being repeated by itself onwards from 1992, the series was also repeated as part of Ants in Your Pants (which was hosted by Edd the Duck's second replacement after "Ratz", Otis the Aardvark) in 1995, and the chorus of the first episode could also be heard in EastEnders episodes from this time period during scenes where children of Walford sat in front of a television.

No.	Title	Original release date
1	"Spider in the Bath"	26 September 1991
The song is the voice of the boy, who tells the audience how he likes every kind of animal, except for spiders. He finds Spider in his bath, and so he tries to put him down the drain, but Spider keeps coming back and laughing.
2	"Just a Spider"	3 October 1991
Spider's lot is a tough one, especially when he is being persecuted by the mischievous boy. After squashings, drownings and downright meanness, Spider manages to escape in an unexpected way.
3	"In My Tent"	10 October 1991
When the boy finds himself trapped in his own makeshift tent and Spider is on his side of the bedroom door, he musters all his resources by using attack as the best form of defence.
4	"Monkey Business"	17 October 1991
When life is pretty boring and they don't know what to do, the boy, his older sister and his younger brother create chaos in their bedroom to ward off the rainy day blues. In the process, they bring new meaning to the phrase "the little monkeys".
5	"Hedgehog Hunt"	24 October 1991
The boy, his older sister and his younger brother set out on a mock safari for Hedgehog, while their parents try to pack the car. Little do the children know that Spider has second guessed their efforts to track down the elusive prickly animal. Every tactic of the hunt is foiled, until they are sent packing.
6	"Spider's Song"	31 October 1991
The boy builds a house of cards which collapses. Only when he notices Spider's persistence does he realize that "try, try again" will get him to his ultimate goal. The boy tops out the completed house of cards with his newly-won friend, Spider.
7	"Little Miss M"	7 November 1991
The traditional nursery rhyme Little Miss Muffet gets a new (albeit very strange) twist: Little Miss "M" is a fat self-indulgent girl who thinks nothing of scoffing a picnic by herself. However, this time she meets more than her match when Spider decides to spike her greedy pastime, and see her off the premises. This is the first of the two episodes that does not feature the boy.
8	"Frog Change"	14 November 1991
Spider is a witness to a romantic story-based episode about a lady and a frog. Her sadness turns to joy when the frog turns into a handsome man. Unfortunately for Spider, his own affections for the lady are rebuffed rudely. This is the second of the two episodes that does not feature the boy.
9	"Hamster Chase"	28 November 1991
The boy accidentally opens his hamster's cage and lets him out. The unfortunate creature finds he is sharing a dangerous world with the household cat who looks on him as an excellent supplement to dinner. Luckily, Spider sees the hamster's plight and helps him to escape the kitten's claws and return him to the cage.
10	"Panda Comes to Stay"	5 December 1991
The boy, who is settling down for the night, cannot believe his eyes when he sees a giant stuffed panda in his bedroom. Wonder turns to astonishment as the panda jumps to life and does a song and dance act. Spider joins the panda in creating fantastical entertainment for him.
11	"Classroom Distractions"	12 December 1991
The boy's first day back at school is a gloomy one and full of distractions. But with the help of his best friend, Spider, he overcomes the blues to emerge triumphant in front of his classmates.
12	"C-Rocker"	19 December 1991
The boy, his older sister and his younger brother decide to have a concert party. They dress up their favourite animals and give them musical instruments. Their fantasy comes to life as the crocodile becomes a rock singer backed by Hedgehog on the lead guitar, Frog on the saxophone, Panda on piano, two Hamsters as backing singers and, of course, Spider, on the drums.
13	"True Friend"	30 December 1991
The boy and Spider have been through so much together, and the audience sees a lyrical sequence telling them about their deep friendship for each other, which is not without its problems.
