= Frayer =

Frayer is a surname. Notable people with the surname include:

- Janis Mackey Frayer (born 1970), Canadian journalist
- Jared Frayer (born 1978), American wrestler
- Kevin Frayer (born 1973), Canadian photojournalist
- Lee Frayer (1874–1938), American racing driver
