= Get Real =

Get Real may refer to:

== Film and TV ==
- Get Real!, a programming block on the Canadian TV channel YTV
- Get Real (British TV series), a 1998 sitcom
- Get Real (American TV series), a 1999–2000 comedy/drama
- Get Real! (1991 TV series), an American children's series featuring Brandon DeShazer
- "Get Real" (8 Simple Rules), an episode of 8 Simple Rules
- Get Real (film), a 1998 British film

== Other ==
- "Get Real", a track on some editions of the David Bowie album Outside
- "Get Real" (song), a 1988 song by Paul Rutherford
- Get Real, a 2012 album by Math the Band and its title track
- "Get Real", a 1989 song by the Reynolds Girls
- Get Real, a novel in the John Dortmunder series by Donald Westlake
