= The Zone (YTV) =

Canadian television programming block

- Network: YTV
- Launched: September 2, 1991; 34 years ago
- Country of origin: Canada
- Owner: Corus Entertainment
- Headquarters: Toronto, Ontario
- Formerly known as: Afterschool Zone (1991-1993)
- Format: Daily afternoon programming block
- Running time: 4:00pm-6:00pm
- Original language: English
- Official website: Official website

The Zone is the flagship weekday afternoon programming block on the Canadian television channel YTV. It airs between 4:00 p.m. and 6:00 p.m. ET and PT in Canada. On Saturday mornings, it is called The Zone Weekend (formerly Crunch), broadcasting between 7:00 a.m. and 12:00 p.m.

Occasionally, guests appear on The Zone; previous guests include children's author Robert Munsch and environmentalist David Suzuki.

== Current version ==
Currently, The Zone is unhosted; YTV dropped program jockeys in summer 2023 due to cuts from Corus CEO Doug Murphy.

== History and current developments ==
The Zone began its life as the Afterschool Zone on YTV, debuting on September 2, 1991, with its first host Gordon Michael Woolvett (aka Gord the PJ Man). Other PJs would take turns hosting the block including PJ Phil (Phil Guerrero), PJ Robb (Rob Stefaniuk) and PJ Rockin' Chan (Chandra Galasso).

The Afterschool Zone was simply a small segment that played between airings of regular television programming, primarily as an entertaining segue into the next programming block to retain viewers and to provide some level of interaction with its young audience. Similar programming existed on YTV's weekend morning broadcasts, also starring a variety of hosts, labelled "PJs", or program jockeys, as a take on DJ (disc jockey) and VJ (video jockey). This was done primarily as a tactic to comply with Canadian Radio-television and Telecommunications Commission restrictions on advertising in children's programming: popular imported programming would run a few minutes short due to fewer ads being permitted compared to US stations. Instead of filling the time with public service announcements or other filler material (which had been the previous practice of YTV in the late 1980s/early 1990s), the idea of devoting several minutes between programs to an interaction between live-action hosts was used and has proven successful to this day.

Eventually, the PJs were joined by a variety of puppets named the Grogs in 1992.

The "Afterschool" portion of the title was dropped in 1993 and PJ "Fresh" Phil was sometimes joined by another PJ, Jenn (although she featured more prominently during weekend morning programming and was rarely on The Zone). The segments usually involved discussion or banter on various topics, video clips, previews, and viewer mail.

July 1994 saw the introduction of the animatronic character Snit (Atul N. Rao), which displayed a pair of moving teeth on a television screen covered with what appeared to be purple bubble gum. When a primetime version of The Zone, YTV Shift, was cancelled, its former host Paul McGuire joined Phil. On October 31, 1997, the Phil and Daryn Jones sent Snit into space, and Snit was replaced with the prop Elvays, a plastic Elvis head with a digitally added moving mouth.

Eventually, a week of programming was devoted to a plotline that featured PJs Phil and Paul on a quest hunting for extraterrestrials and making a discovery. This discovery was revealed to be the return of the Snit character (minus its familiar purple colouring). Following cosmetic and technological upgrades, Snit went on to host Snit Station, a weekend morning programming block on September 18, 1999. The block was later renamed The Vortex before it was renamed CRUNCH.

A female co-host, Sandra Jackson, was added to the Zone in 1999. She began hosting alongside McGuire and Phil.

Another voice on the show was Egghead (the director Greg Dickinson, who worked on The Zone from 1993 to 2008) Egghead's face was never seen. He also appeared several times as "the guy in the gorilla suit".

As a slight format change, the "You Rule!" campaign was replaced with a "Keep it Weird!" theme. When the New Year came, Jackson, McGuire, and Phil were found to not be "Y2K Compatible" and left The Zone on November 12, 1999, venturing into other opportunities.

The following week starting November 15, 1999, they were replaced with comedian Pat Kelly and Jennifer Racicot (previously PJ Katie on Treehouse, with no relation to the original PJ Jenn or PJ Jazzy Jan). Elvays was replaced with "the Hand in the Toilet".

While Racicot and Kelly were hosts, they formed the band "Nuclear Donkey", which was featured at the end of the YTV's compilation album Big Fun Party Mix (with the exception of 7, 8, and 10).

During February and March 2001, a plotline emerged involving electronic insects known as Yokomites that were under the control of a mysterious chicken-man named Friendly Fowl. They were created by Fowl to destroy the station, should his demand to be given the station was ignored. In the end, there was an animated comic where Kelly and Racicot went into the Yokomites' lair to defeat them. The hand in the toilet was "killed" when it saved them.

With Racicot's departure, Kelly had a brief breakdown as a one-week plotline, where he demanded a new co-host or he would no longer host. He built a giant wooden crate in the studio parking lot and locked himself inside it as a protest until YTV hired a new co-host. At the end of the week Sugar Beard came along claiming to be Kelly's new co-host and she opened the crate with a crowbar to reveal a dishevelled Kelly who was in desperate need of a shower. The two co-hosted the block afterwards. However, Kelly himself soon also departed in early 2002, leaving Beard as the lone host. A plotline emerged where Beard would discover that one of the YTV's janitors was playing with the cameras during off-hours, clandestinely acting out as a host for The Zone. Employing detective skills to track down this janitor, Beard eventually discovered Carlos Bustamante and invited him to become her co-host in 2002, a position he held until 2018.

Beard and Bustamante hosted together from 2002 to 2007, introducing such segments as "A Dash of Sugar" and "Late Afternoon With Tito Lemmy", along with many characters such as Van Vogel, Pretty Tiffany, Johnny "The Brick" Wahl, and Wiwyam Birdie. They also co-wrote six songs together as the band "Nuclear Donkey".

On January 19, 2007, Beard announced that she would leave The Zone on January 26, 2007. Sugar's last "Nuclear Donkey" song, Z-Dot, appeared on Big Fun Party Mix 8, a compilation from YTV.

Bustamante hosted The Zone alone until Monday, December 31, 2007, on The Zone's Countdown to Halfway to New Year's party, where he introduced his new co-host, Joyce Quansah. She had recently appeared on The Zone working at the Tree Farm, where Bustamante chose The Zones Christmas Tree. Quansah co-hosted until January 2, 2009, when she left to travel the world. In fall 2009, The Zone returned to starting at 3:00 p.m. instead of 4:00 p.m.

In October 2013, two new hosts were announced, The Next Star's Mark "Suki" Suknanan and TFC's Rachel Bonnetta. Suknanan is responsible for all things celebrities and Bonnetta talks about the latest trends. These are the first two new cast members since Andrew Chapman.

On December 31, 2013, Chapman announced he was leaving The Zone.

In November 2014, Bonnetta and Adam Christie left The Zone, and Lisa Gilroy from Undercover High got added to the team. Around the same time, a brand new contest called "The Z-Head Zearch" was introduced asking fans to submit videos to be aired on The Zone.

On January 7, 2017, Meisha Watson began co-hosting The Zone Weekend.

On May 23, 2018, Spencer Litzinger joined The Zone.

On December 3, 2018, Bustamante left YTV after 16 years to become a full-time reporter for Entertainment Tonight Canada, on YTV's sister network Global.

On March 22, 2019, Watson left YTV and her hosting duties of The Zone and The Zone Weekend.

On March 23, 2019, Litzinger started co-hosting The Zone Weekend.

On September 3, 2019, Tyra Sweet joined The Zone. She left the block in 2022.

On October 26, 2019, Suknanan left The Zone and The Zone Weekend to be on Canada's Drag Race as his drag alter ego Priyanka. He later won the first season of the show.

In March 2020, Alex Wierzbicki joined The Zone. Around the same time, the COVID-19 lockdowns were implemented in Canada. The Zone continued in the place of the hosts' room, called "Zone From Home"

On June 6, 2022, Melony Manikavasagar joined The Zone.

On October 13, 2022, Alex Wierzbicki announced his departure from The Zone to move on to different projects. His final segment aired on October 31.

In summer 2023, Corus fired Spencer, Melony, and Kelsey, all hosts of the Zone due to cuts from Corus CEO Doug Murphy; therefore, program jockeys were dropped. Currently, The Zone is unhosted. Spencer still makes occasional guest appearances.

== Set Changes ==
When The Afterschool Zone began as a regular block on September 2, 1991, the set consisted of a multicoloured living room with abstract shapes and a map of Canada.

In late 1993, when the block was renamed to "The Zone", the set featured a grey background with YTV written on the walls and a TV next to the host that showed what was being broadcast on TV.

In 1994, the set was changed to a more common, all-blue set with graffiti and eyeballs. In this set, you can see the red lizard with the 1991–1995 YTV wordmark. In 1994, Snit was added.

From 1998 to late 1999, the set was changed to have a purple and black spiral floor with The Zone logo in the middle and green walls. A large rotating fan was built into the wall. There was a couch and chairs for the host and guests. Later, a toilet with a TV inside was added.

In November 1999, it was changed to a subway train set that featured a TV set and Metro print ads-styled block bumpers of The Zone. There is also an orange checkerboard floor. The change coincided with a change in hosts.

In 2002, the set was changed to match YTV's 2002–2007 look. The set was redesigned to feature a new logo of The Zone. There is also a silver fan.

In 2007, after Sugar left, the subway train set from 1999 to 2007 was gone, so the set was redesigned as a center stage with liquid stuff on it, and featuring the block's logo in the middle of the floor. There were also HDTVs that were standing through the set. The walls also gained a green colour scheme.

In 2010, the set was simplified, the set now has lights under it and the words The Zone are put back. The walls are now glowing purple, sometimes other colours for certain occasions. The TVs are now put to the shelf again. In 2013, the entire set gained a green colour scheme.

In 2020, each host of The Zone received their own individual sets to practice physical distancing due to the COVID-19 pandemic. Each of their sets was decorated accordingly to the host. Occasionally, they will film segments outside at Sherbourne Common.

In late 2021, the individual sets have been removed after COVID-19 restrictions were lifted, allowing the hosts to be together on camera. They filmed Zone segments in the lobby of Corus Quay, in front of a wood slat wall.
