= The Adrenaline Project =

- Directed by: Casey Walker; Adam Reid; Rae Upton; Allen Myers; Mitch Burman; Gord McFarlane
- Presented by: Richard Cazeau (season 1); Boomer Phillips
- Country of origin: Canada
- No. of seasons: 2
- No. of episodes: 39

Production
- Production locations: Amaranth, Ontario, Canada
- Running time: 30 minutes
- Production company: marblemedia (Note: As marblemedia Adrenaline 2 Inc. for the second series)

Original release
- Network: YTV
- Release: September 29, 2007 – April 21, 2009

The Adrenaline Project is a Canadian youth extreme sports reality television series produced by Canadian production company marblemedia and distributed by Decode Entertainment. Season 1 premiered on September 29, 2007 on YTV's Get Real! block, and on FOX's 4Kids TV. The first season was hosted by former MuchMoreMusic VJ Richard "Caz" Cazeau, and also featured Boomer Phillips.

YTV ordered a second season in April 2008, with it being shot the following summer. Hosted exclusively by Phillips, the 26-episode season premiered in Canada on September 6, 2008 at 6:00pm ET. This season was not broadcast in the US, as 4Kids TV cancelled the series on April 5, 2008, and it was not moved to its successor block, The CW4Kids.

== Format ==
In Season 1 each week, The Adrenaline Project takes five teenagers to Boomer's base camp, where they compete in two physical and mental challenges. One contestant is eliminated in each of the base camp challenges. The three remaining contestants go to Caz's final challenge and compete to win the competition and associated prizes.

In season 2, six teenagers compete each week in a tournament that spans half of the season. In each of the two semi-finals, five winners and one wild card compete in a series of three rounds in the same format. The two semi-final winners move on to the final to compete in a series of three challenges to determine the Ultimate Adrenalite. The second half of the season has 60 new competitors competing in the same tournament format. In addition, winners of this season would win a trip to Walt Disney World in FL. The Adrenaline Project is a Marblemedia production, and created by Mark Bishop and Matt Hornburg. Despite the fact that the show is a Canadian production, the version airing on YTV is not entirely the same as the version airing on 4Kids TV. During the episode in the US broadcasts, trivia will appear either horizontally or vertically displaying factoids relating to that particular event. This does not appear in the version airing on YTV. The program formerly aired on the Spanish-language, Latin American version of Boomerang.

== Cast ==
=== Caz ===
Caz is the co-host of The Adrenaline Project in season 1. Each week, Caz joins the three contestants that make it past Boomer's basic training, and travels with them to the destination for that week's final challenge. While the contestants don't know what they are in for until the last moment, Caz guides them through the final challenge. Caz does not appear in Season 2.

=== Boomer ===
Boomer does the basic training for the five contestants and during the two rounds, the last place player is eliminated. In Season 2, Boomer is the only first-season host. He does basic training with the six contestants and hosts each of the three challenges.

== Episodes ==
=== Season 1: 2007–2008 ===
- Episode 1 – Cliff Hanger – September 29, 2007

Place	Contestant	Result		
1st	Klayton	1st	3rd	Winner
2nd	Tracey	4th	2nd	Runner-Up
3rd	Victoria	2nd	1st	Eliminated
4th	Stephen	3rd	Eliminated	
5th	Mike	Eliminated		

- Episode 2 – Under Pressure – October 13, 2007

Place	Contestant	Result		
1st	Zamir	1st	1st	Winner
2nd	Emily	3rd	3rd	Runner-Up
3rd	Will	2nd	2nd	Eliminated
4th	Miruna	4th	Eliminated	
5th	Victoria	Eliminated		

- Episode 3 – Draw the Line (also known as Zipline) – October 20, 2007

Place	Contestant	Result		
1st	Alex	3rd	2nd	Winner
2nd	Angus	4th	3rd	Eliminated
3rd	Madeline	2nd	1st	Runner Up
4th	David	1st	Eliminated	
5th	Kristen	Eliminated		

- Episode 4 – A Rock and a Hard Place – October 27, 2007

Place	Contestant	Result		
1st	Derek	1st	2nd	Winner
2nd	Jordan	4th	3rd	Eliminated
3rd	Jenelle	2nd	1st	Runner-Up
4th	Eddie	3rd	Eliminated	
5th	Mathoraa	Eliminated		

- Episode 5 – Up The Creek – November 10, 2007

Place	Contestant	Result		
1st	Zenon	4th	2nd	Winner
2nd	Zahailey	3rd	1st	Runner-Up
3rd	Nykeem	2nd	3rd	Eliminated
4th	Emily	1st	Eliminated	
5th	Jenna	Eliminated		

- Episode 6 – Sea What I Mean? – November 17, 2007

Place	Contestant	Result		
1st	Lindsay	3rd	T-1st	Winner
2nd	Michael	2nd	T-1st	Runner-Up
3rd	Ryan	1st	T-1st	Eliminated
4th	Allison	4th	Eliminated	
5th	Rae	Eliminated		

- Episode 7 – Leap of Faith – November 24, 2007

Place	Contestant	Result		
1st	Shaydel	4th	1st	Winner
2nd	Ashley	2nd	2nd	Runner-Up
3rd	Sarah	3rd	3rd	Eliminated
4th	Kevin	1st	Eliminated	
5th	Ashley	Eliminated		

- Episode 8 – Trail Blazer – December 1, 2007

Place	Contestant	Result		
1st	William	2nd	T-1st	Winner
2nd	Nicholas	1st	T-1st	Runner-Up
3rd	Turner	3rd	3rd	Eliminated
4th	Katie	4th	Eliminated	
5th	Logan	Eliminated		

- Episode 9 – Mush – December 8, 2007

Place	Contestant	Result		
1st	Will	2nd	T-1st	Winner
2nd	Nick	1st	T-1st	Runner-Up
3rd	Turner	3rd	3rd	Eliminated
4th	Katie	4th	Eliminated	
5th	Logan	Eliminated		

- Episode 10 – Water Walker – December 15, 2007

Place	Contestant	Result		
1st	Kaleb	1st	2nd	Winner
2nd	Steph	4th	1st	Runner-Up
3rd	Holly	3rd	3rd	Eliminated
4th	Mike	2nd	Eliminated	
5th	Charlotte	Eliminated		

- Episode 11 – Don't Cross Me – January 19, 2008

Place	Contestant	Result		
1st	Jade	2nd	1st	Winner
2nd	Emily	4th	3rd	Runner-Up
3rd	Emma	1st	2nd	Eliminated
4th	Michelina	3rd	Eliminated	
5th	Melissa	Eliminated		

- Episode 12 – In Thin Air – January 26, 2008

Place	Contestant	Result		
1st	Brandon	3rd	1st	Winner
T2nd	Lisa	4th	2nd	Runner-Up
T2nd	Ernesto	1st	3rd	Runner-Up
4th	Moriah	2nd	Eliminated	
5th	Jill	Eliminated		

- Episode 13 – I Can Dig It – February 2, 2008

Place	Contestant	Result		
1st	Taz	1st	T-2nd	Winner
2nd	Jacob	4th	1st	Runner-Up
3rd	Dan	2nd	T-2nd	Eliminated
4th	Cordell	3rd	Eliminated	
5th	Junior	Eliminated		

== Season 2: 2008–2009 ==
Season 2 did not air on 4Kids TV, but only on YTV.

=== First Tournament ===
- Episode 14 – Houdini – September 20, 2008

Winner and semi-finalist – Paige Haight

Competition:		Preliminary		
Place	Contestant	Result		
1st	Paige	1st	Safe	Winner
2nd	James	1st	Safe	Runner-Up
3rd	Ivan	2nd	Eliminated	
4th	Eric	2nd	Eliminated	
6th	Amber	Eliminated		
6th	Rebecca	Eliminated		

- Episode 15 – Bridge It – September 27, 2008

Winner and semi-finalist – Andrew Brownlee

Competition:		Preliminary		
Place	Contestant	Result		
1st	Andrew B.	1st	Safe	Winner
2nd	Rebecca	2nd	Safe	Runner-Up
3rd	Taylor	1st	Eliminated	
4th	Leila	2nd	Eliminated	
6th	Zhavion	Eliminated		
6th	Andrew P.	Eliminated		

- Episode 16 – Special: Air Cadets – October 4, 2008

Winner and semi-finalist – Dylan Stephans

Competition:		Preliminary		
Place	Contestant	Result		
1st	Dylan	1st	Safe	Winner
2nd	Ersin	1st	Safe	Runner-Up
3rd	Sukriti	1st	Eliminated	
4th	George	Safe	Eliminated	
6th	Joudi	Eliminated		
6th	Rebecca	Eliminated		

- Episode 17 – Drop the Rope – October 11, 2008

Winner and semi-finalist – Tucker McNee

Competition:		Preliminary		
Place	Contestant	Result		
1st	Tucker	Safe	2nd	Winner
2nd	Levethan	Safe	1st	Runner-Up
3rd	Ella	Safe	Eliminated	
4th	Shawnee	Safe	Eliminated	
6th	Chanel	Eliminated		
6th	Patrick	Eliminated		

- Episode 18 – Special: Beauty Queens – October 18, 2008

Winner and semi-finalist – Selina Mendez

Competition:		Preliminary		
Place	Contestant	Result		
1st	Selina	1st	2nd	Winner
2nd	Brittany	1st	1st	Runner-Up
3rd	Pierrette	1st	Eliminated	
4th	Shawna	Safe	Eliminated	
6th	Angela	Eliminated		
6th	Raquel	Eliminated		

- Episode 19 – Keys to Your Future – October 25, 2008

Winner and semi-finalist – Josh Evans

Competition:		Preliminary		
Place	Contestant	Result		
1st	Josh	Safe	1st	Winner
2nd	Isaac	1st	2nd	Runner-Up
3rd	Kelsie	1st	Eliminated	
4th	Zane	1st	Eliminated	
6th	Angelica	Eliminated		
6th	Samantha	Eliminated		

- Episode 20 – X-Sports – November 1, 2008

Winner and semi-finalist – Kasper Sherk

Competition:		Preliminary		
Place	Contestant	Result		
1st	Kasper	Safe	1st	Winner
2nd	Jessy	Safe	2nd	Runner-Up
3rd	Harrison	Safe	Eliminated	
4th	Taylor	Safe	Eliminated	
6th	Taylor	Eliminated		
6th	Amelia	Eliminated		

- Episode 21 – Twins – November 8, 2008

Winner and semi-finalist – Zachary Moore

Competition:		Preliminary		
Place	Contestant	Result		
1st	Zachary	1st	2nd	Winner
2nd	Sophie	2nd	1st	Runner-Up
3rd	Jeremy	1st	Eliminated	
4th	Jesse	2nd	Eliminated	
6th	Petra	Eliminated		
6th	Carly	Eliminated		

- Episode 22 – Breaking Away – November 15, 2008

Winner and semi-finalist – Logan Cordiner

Competition:		Preliminary		
Place	Contestant	Result		
1st	Logan	1st	1st	Winner
2nd	Casandra	1st	2nd	Runner-Up
3rd	Greg	1st	Eliminated	
4th	Nicki	Safe	Eliminated	
6th	Nick	Eliminated		
6th	Laura	Eliminated		

- Episode 23 – Special: Karate Kids – November 15, 2008

Winner and semi-finalist – Jamal Muckett

Competition:		Preliminary		
Place	Contestant	Result		
1st	Jamal	1st	Safe	Winner
2nd	Chloe-Joy	1st	Safe	Runner-Up
3rd	Natalie	2nd	Eliminated	
4th	Daniel	2nd	Eliminated	
6th	Roman	Eliminated		
6th	Rachelle	Eliminated		

- Episode 24 – Semi-Finals #1 – November 22, 2008

Winner and finalist – Andrew Brownlee

Competition:		Semi-finals		
Place	Contestant	Result		
1st	Andrew	1st	Safe	Winner
2nd	Selina	1st	Safe	Runner-Up
3rd	Zachary	1st	Eliminated	
4th	Tucker	Safe	Eliminated	
6th	Logan	Eliminated		
6th	Harrison*	Eliminated		

Wildcard; chosen by Boomer directly.

- Episode 25 – Semi-Finals #2 – November 22, 2008

Winner and finalist – Kasper Sherk

Competition:		Semi-finals		
Place	Contestant	Result		
1st	Kasper	2nd	2nd	Winner
2nd	Jamal	1st	1st	Runner-Up
3rd	Josh	2nd	Eliminated	
4th	Paige	1st	Eliminated	
6th	Dylan	Eliminated		
6th	Sophie*	Eliminated		

Wildcard; chosen by Boomer directly.

- Episode 26 – The Ultimate Adrenalite – November 29, 2008

Winner and Ultimate Adrenalite – Andrew Brownlee

Competition:		Finals		
Place	Contestant	Result		
1st	Andrew	1st	1st	Winner
2nd	Kasper	2nd	2nd	Runner-Up

=== Second Tournament ===
- Episode 27 – Up, Up and Away – January 27, 2009

Winner and semi-finalist – Rachel Gooz

Competition:		Preliminary		
Place	Contestant	Result		
1st	Rachel G.	2nd	Safe	Winner
2nd	William	2nd	Safe	Runner-Up
3rd	Denver	1st	Eliminated	
4th	Rachel T.	1st	Eliminated	
6th	Brittney	Eliminated		
6th	Nic	Eliminated		

- Episode 28 – Cannon Ball – February 3, 2009

Winner and semi-finalist – Scott Goddard

Competition:		Preliminary		
Place	Contestant	Result		
1st	Scott	1st	1st	Winner
2nd	Leonney	2nd	1st	Runner-Up
4th	Tyler	1st	Eliminated	
4th	Tony	2nd	Eliminated	
6th	Jordan	Eliminated		
6th	Hasina	Eliminated		

- Episode 29 – All in the Family – February 10, 2009

Winner and semi-finalist – Mitch Morris

Competition:		Preliminary		
Place	Contestant	Result		
1st	Mitch	1st	1st	Winner
2nd	Reid	1st	2nd	Runner-Up
3rd	Steve	2nd	Eliminated	
4th	Kate	2nd	Eliminated	
6th	Adrienne	Eliminated		
6th	Joanne	Eliminated		

- Episode 30 – Locked, Loaded, and Loose – February 17, 2009

Winner and semi-finalist – Sarah Clark

Competition:		Preliminary		
Place	Contestant	Result		
1st	Sarah	1st	Safe	Winner
2nd	Blake	1st	Safe	Runner-Up
3rd	Ellie	Save	Eliminated	
4th	Melanie	1st	Eliminated	
6th	Nick	Eliminated		
6th	Lillian	Eliminated		

- Episode 31 – Around the Horn – February 24, 2009

Winner and semi-finalist – Nano Clow

Competition:		Preliminary		
Place	Contestant	Result		
1st	Nano	1st	1st	Winner
2nd	Megan	1st	2nd	Runner-Up
4th	Aiden	1st	Eliminated	
4th	Jessica	Safe	Eliminated	
6th	Rebecca	Eliminated		
6th	Ermais	Eliminated		

- Episode 32 – Human Pendulum – March 3, 2009

Winner and semi-finalist – Dimytry Smiths

Competition:		Preliminary		
Place	Contestant	Result		
1st	Dimytry	1st	1st	Winner
2nd	Sophia	2nd	2nd	Runner-Up
3rd	Joel	1st	Eliminated	
4th	Richard	2nd	Eliminated	
6th	Laura	Eliminated		
6th	Clarissa	Eliminated		

- Episode 33 – Special: Cheerleaders – March 10, 2009

Winner and semi-finalist – Kiki Cordado

Competition:		Preliminary		
Place	Contestant	Result		
1st	Kiki	2nd	Safe	Winner
2nd	Emma	1st	Safe	Runner-Up
3rd	Chino	1st	Eliminated	
4th	Carly	2nd	Eliminated	
6th	Christly	Eliminated		
6th	Kelsey	Eliminated		

- Episode 34 – Special: Models – March 17, 2009

Winner and semi-finalist – Jordan Murrell

Competition:		Preliminary		
Place	Contestant	Result		
1st	Jordan	1st	2nd	Winner
2nd	Victoria	1st	1st	Runner-Up
3rd	Michael	1st	Eliminated	
4th	Josh	Safe	Eliminated	
6th	Kyana	Eliminated		
6th	Jessica	Withdrew*		

Jessica withdrew due to her leg injury and had to be sent to the hospital. She did not compete in the elimination challenge.

- Episode 35 – Battleball Regatta – March 24, 2009

Winner and semi-finalist – Mark Gaudet

Competition:		Preliminary		
Place	Contestant	Result		
1st	Mark	Safe	Safe	Winner
2nd	Holly	1st	Safe	Runner-Up
3rd	Christiana	1st	Eliminated	
4th	Simrin	1st	Eliminated	
6th	Mike	Eliminated		
6th	Josh	Eliminated		

- Episode 36 – Special: Scouts – March 31, 2009

Winner and semi-finalist – Stephanie Forsyth

Competition:		Preliminary		
Place	Contestant	Result		
1st	Stephanie	2nd	1st	Winner
2nd	Evan	2nd	2nd	Runner-Up
3rd	Ian	1st	Eliminated	
4th	Mathew	1st	Eliminated	
6th	Alex	Eliminated		
6th	Emily	Eliminated		

- Episode 37 – Semi-Finals #1 – April 7, 2009

Winner and finalist – Dimytry Smiths

Competition:		Semi-finals		
Place	Contestant	Result		
1st	Dimytry	1st	Safe	Winner
2nd	Stephanie	1st	Safe	Runner-Up
3rd	Kiki	1st	Eliminated	
4th	Jordan	Safe	Eliminated	
6th	Rachel	Eliminated		
6th	Holly*	Eliminated		

Wildcard; chosen by Boomer directly.

- Episode 38 – Semi-Finals #2 – April 14, 2009

Winner and finalist – Nano Clow

Competition:		Semi-finals		
Place	Contestant	Result		
1st	Nano	1st	2nd	Winner
2nd	Mark	2nd	1st	Runner-Up
3rd	Scott	1st	Eliminated	
4th	Sarah	2nd	Eliminated	
6th	Mitch	Eliminated		
6th	Sophia*	Eliminated		

Wildcard; chosen by Boomer directly.

- Episode 39 – The Ultimate Adrenalite – April 21, 2009

Winner and Ultimate Adrenalite- Nano Clow

Competition:		Finals		
Place	Contestant	Result		
1st	Nano	2nd	1st	Winner
2nd	Dimytry	1st	2nd	Runner-Up

== Music ==
Main Theme Song: Glory – These Silhouettes

- Note: This song was not recorded by the rock band These Silhouettes entirely. This was sung by Stuart Aiken from the band, but was also written by Jesse Colborne and Aaron Verdonk (of The Stereos).

== Awards ==
The Adrenaline Project has been nominated for a Gemini Award for Best Children's or Youth Non-Fiction Program or Series.
