= List of shows on CRUNCH =

The following is a list of shows that were on CRUNCH on YTV.

== Canadian ==
- Rollbots
- Sidekick
- Scaredy Squirrel
- Kid vs. Kat
- League of Super Evil
- Team Galaxy
- Viva Piñata

== Nicktoons ==
- SpongeBob SquarePants
- The Fairly OddParents
- T.U.F.F. Puppy
- Planet Sheen
- Fanboy & Chum Chum
- The Penguins of Madagascar
- The X's

== Marvel ==
- Wolverine and the X-Men
- The Super Hero Squad Show
- Fantastic Four World's Greatest Heroes

== Italian ==
- Monster Allergy
