= Little Charmers =

- Genre: Action; Adventure; Comedy; Fantasy
- Created by: Jennifer Dodge; Irene Weibel
- Developed by: Carolyn Hay
- Directed by: Jason Groh; Sean V. Jeffrey (season 2)
- Voices of: Addison Holley; Alexa Torrington; Matilda Gilbert
- Narrated by: Snow White Scott
- Opening theme: "Little Charmers Theme" performed by unknown songstress
- Ending theme: "Little Charmers Theme" (Instrumental)
- Composers: Asher Lenz; Stephan Skratt
- Country of origin: Canada
- Original language: English
- No. of seasons: 2
- No. of episodes: 57 (or 53) (list of episodes)

Production
- Executive producers: Jennifer Dodge; Patricia R. Burns; Noah Luke; Toni Stevens
- Running time: 22 minutes
- Production companies: Atomic Cartoons; Spin Master Entertainment (Note: As Spin Master Charming Productions Inc.); Nelvana Enterprises, Inc.

Original release
- Network: Treehouse TV
- Release: January 12, 2015 – April 15, 2017

Little Charmers is a Canadian animated fantasy comedy television series produced by Spin Master Entertainment in association with Nelvana Enterprises, Inc. with animation provided by Atomic Cartoons for Treehouse TV. The series first premiered on Nickelodeon in the United States on January 12, 2015, and ended on April 15, 2017. Treehouse TV announced a week later that it was scheduled in Canada on January 31; however, the second episode premiered six days after this announcement, and six days prior to the scheduled premiere. 57 episodes were produced.

== Characters ==
=== Main ===
- Hazel Charming (voiced by Addison Holley) is a young pink-haired Charmer and Enchantress-in-training whose magic is known for its tendency not to work out well, to the point that her magical mishaps and her cat named Seven, are known as being Hazeled. Sometimes she uses her wand in the Charmhouse. Her musical instrument in Rainbow Sparkle is an electric guitar.
- Lavender (voiced by Alexa Torrington) is a bow-loving and purple-haired Charmer who uses her wand for making potions to help the others, and she also has a pet dragon named Flare. She has won awards for fashion design. Her catchphrase is "Charmazing!" Her musical instrument in Rainbow Sparkle is a set of drums.
- Posie (voiced by Matilda Gilbert) is a lighthearted, blonde-haired Charmer who uses her wand to play it as the flute. She has two brothers, her older brother is named Parsley and her baby brother is named Thistle, and her pet owl is named Treble. Easily excitable and very gentle, Posie is optimistic and peaceful by default. She sees the beauty in everything and can be very sweet with a motherly flair and ability to trust her instincts. She can be easily distracted however, and is very chatty to the point of accidentally being blunt with others or a little rude. Posie does her best to keep everyone encouraged and uplifted. Her musical instrument in Rainbow Sparkle is a keyboard.
- Mr. Charming (voiced by Andrew Sabiston) is Hazel's bespectacled wizard father and the owner of a broom store.
- Mrs. Charming (also known as Enchantress or The Enchantress) (voiced by Lisette St. Louis) is Hazel's mother and the most powerful Charmer. In her role as Enchantress, she uses her magic to deal with problems around Charmville. Her name is revealed to Chanty in the episode A Charmazing Mermaid Tale.
- Seven is Hazel's cat.
- Flare is Lavender's dragon.
- Treble is Posie's owl.
- Parsley (voiced by Lucius Hoyos) is Posie's older brother. Although not seen using his powers as often, he is also capable of casting charms and cause mischief. He works at Mr. Charming's broom shop as an assistant and has a slight crush on Hazel.

=== Recurring ===
- Prince Ferg (voiced by Gage Munroe) is a frog prince of the pond. Was originally a normal prince but was turned into a frog, though he reveals that both his father and grandfather had been frog princes as well.
- Gary the Gnome shows up in several episodes.
- Mrs. Greensparkle the schoolteacher shows up in several episodes.
- Olive shows up in several episodes.
- Willow shows up in several episodes.
- An unnamed green mother dragon returns in the episode Dragon Daycare after being shown in an earlier episode.
- Nelson the Gnome appears in the episode Nelson in Charge to babysit the Charmers.
- Picklemunchinfeet (nicknamed Pickles) (voiced by Brian Froud) is a lonely ogre the charmers befriend.
- Princess Corina is a mermaid that Hazel befriends.
- Splish is the childhood nickname of Corina's mother when she was friends with Chanty.

== Episodes ==
Season	Episodes	Originally released	
Season	Episodes	First released	Last released
1	44	January 12, 2015	June 17, 2016
2	13	April 10, 2017	April 15, 2017

== Merchandise ==
All 14 toys based on the series were made in North America (Canada/USA) and Europe. Spin Master made toys including dolls, figurines, plushies and RPGs. Additionally, bedding was made by Baby Boom Consumer Products, cake decorations by Bakery Crafts Halloween costumes by Rubie's Costume Company, and other products by Scholastic.

Four games for the series, Charmers in Training, Hazel Eyes, Junior Brooms, and Sparkle Up! were made as well.

== Telecast and home media ==
Little Charmers premiered on Nickelodeon in the U.S. on January 12, 2015, on Nick Jr. in Australia and New Zealand on May 4, 2015, on Nick Jr. Too in the United Kingdom and Ireland on June 22, on Nick Jr. in Southeast Asia and Europe on July 6, and Treehouse TV in Canada on January 31, and on 3Kids in Ireland. It was shown in Spacetoon in the Middle East. Disney Junior also aired the series from December 31, 2018 to August 31, 2024. From Fall 2018 until December 2022, Starz Kids & Family also aired the series in every even-numbered month, but only at its first season due to its second and final one being unavailable.

In the mid-late 2010s, eOne (now as Lionsgate Canada) released DVDs along with kaBOOM! in North America.

From 2023-2026, the first 20 episodes of the series were also available for streaming on Tubi.
