= List of Little Charmers episodes =

Little Charmers is a Canadian CGI interactive children's television series produced by Nelvana Enterprises, Spin Master Entertainment and Atomic Cartoons for Treehouse TV. The series premiered on Nickelodeon in the United States on January 12, 2015, and ended on April 15, 2017. Treehouse TV announced a week later that it was scheduled in Canada on the last day of January; however, episode 2 debuted six days after this announcement, and six days prior to the scheduled debut.

== Series overview ==
Season	Episodes	Originally released	
Season	Episodes	First released	Last released
1	44	January 12, 2015	June 17, 2016
2	13	April 10, 2017	April 15, 2017

== Episodes ==
=== Season 1 (2015–16) ===
No.	Title	Written by	U.S. air date	Canadian air date	Prod. code	US viewers (millions)
1a	"Double Trouble Spell"	Brian Hartigan	January 12, 2015	January 25, 2015	103	N/A
Hazel clones herself to finish cleaning up her room so she can go to the Sleepover. But another Hazel causes to make more copies by discovering the spell and make them clean the town. Now, Hazel has to save the day.
1b	"Charming Pets"	Steve Sullivan	January 12, 2015	January 25, 2015	103	N/A
The Charmers and their pets swap bodies.
2a	"Prince Not So Charming"	Steve Sullivan	January 14, 2015	February 1, 2015	101	N/A
After reading a book where a frog is turned into a prince, the Charmers try to find a prince trapped in a frog's body.
2b	"A Charming Outfit"	Aaron Barnett	January 14, 2015	February 1, 2015	101	N/A
Hazel tries to charm her dress that her mother wants her to wear for school picture day.
3a	"A Charming Do Over"	Ben Joseph	January 16, 2015	February 8, 2015	104	N/A
On the Annual Crystal Ball Carnival, the Little Charmers are having fun at the carnival, they wanted the crystal ball but Parsley tricks them into losing the game, later, the Charmers make up a spell and the day repeats via magic. Will they get the Crystal Ball on time without being tricked?
3b	"A Charming Fad"	Diane Moore	January 16, 2015	February 8, 2015	104	N/A
4a	"Lucky Seven"	Dan Williams & Lienne Sawatsky	January 19, 2015	February 15, 2015	105	N/A
Seven runs off after being pushed out by Hazel. Hazel and her friends must find Seven before the Crystal Comet Day.
4b	"Moon Madness"	Steve Sullivan	January 19, 2015	February 15, 2015	105	N/A
After the Charmers have a sleepover, they saw the moon and have an all-night sleepover party, the Charmers use magic on the Moon and is brought to life. Later, the Charmers need to find a way to get the Moon back up there before Morning.
5a	"Switcheroo"	John May & Suzanne Bolch	January 21, 2015	February 15, 2015	106	N/A
Hazel switches bodies with her mom. Later, there's a fight between the ogres and the gnomes.
5b	"Garden Pests"	Brian Hartigan	January 21, 2015	February 15, 2015	106	N/A
The Charmers are having a garden party, until a hairweed shows up. They need to get rid of it without magic - and they should definitely not pull it out!
6a	"Charming Chatterbox"	Aaron Barnett	January 23, 2015	January 25, 2015	109	N/A
The Charmers find Mom's old toy which is a chattery chatterbox. The Charmers teach magic spells to it, which causes the chatterbox to create troubles around Charmville. Now, they need to stop it before it spreads its chatter! Before they can do so, Gnome Zeli's voice is switched with an ogre's!
6b	"Cluck Stars"	Steve Sullivan	January 23, 2015	January 25, 2015	109	N/A
The Charmers form a music band called Rainbow Sparkle in order to participate in a musical talent contest; troubles begin when too much magic is used to improve their musical performance.
7a	"Freeze Dance"	Steve Sullivan	January 27, 2015	February 22, 2015	107	N/A
The Charmers want snow to come so they use the Snow Dance spell. Soon, they made Snowflake, a Snow Charmer which is brought to life. When the snow melts, the Charmers do a freeze dance and freeze the town. Snowflake is having fun and the Charmers need to do something fast. Will they succeed at unfreezing Charmville?
7b	"The Gingerbread Boy"	Steve Sullivan	January 27, 2015	February 22, 2015	107	N/A
The Charmers meet Gingerbread Boy, who claims there are people who want to eat him. They first try to dress him up with vegetables to make him less inviting to eat, but since that doesn't work the Charmers make the Gingerbread Boy invisible. It soon causes havoc in Charmville and the Charmers need to stop it. They soon realize it needs a friend so the problem will be solved.
8a	"Fashion No Show"	Brian Hartigan	January 29, 2015	February 22, 2015	110	0.69
8b	"Locket or Lose It"	John May & Suzanne Bolch	January 29, 2015	February 22, 2015	110	0.69
The Charmers get their own lockets for being friends for a long time. Hazel wants to make a perfect Lavender picture on her locket but instead takes her inside the locket. The Charmers go on a quest to bring her back and meet a new ogre, which is Pickle Munchingfeet.
9a	"Uncharmed Life"	Steve Sullivan	February 20, 2015	March 1, 2015	111	N/A
9b	"Pest Friends Forever"	Steve Sullivan	February 20, 2015	March 1, 2015	111	N/A
(Not to be confused with the later episode "Pet Friends Forever".)
10	"Charmy Hearts Day" "Charming Heart Day"	Steve Sullivan	February 13, 2015	September 17, 2015, under proper title January 3, 2016, under altered	112	1.18
A Valentine's Day themed episode.
11a	"A Charming Trio"	Steve Sullivan	February 20, 2015	February 1, 2015	102	N/A
11b	"Add a Little Parsley" "Add A Little Parsley"	Ursula Ziegler-Sullivan	February 20, 2015	February 1, 2015	102	N/A
12a	"Hairy Ways"	Steve Sullivan	March 13, 2015	March 1, 2015	113	N/A
A hair misspell inconveniences Hazel and her parents.
12b	"Calling All Cauldrons"	Steve Sullivan	March 13, 2015	March 1, 2015	113	N/A
The Charmers get a new cauldron after their old one starts to malfunction. They soon go on a quest to bring him back after they realize he went away because he felt no more wanted.
13a	"Wish Upon A Jar" "Wish Upon a Jar"	Steve Sullivan	March 13, 2015	March 15, 2015	114	N/A
When Hazel captures a falling star in a jar, she has fun with unlimited wishes, only to learn people aren't getting any wishes any more without the star being free.
13b	"Upside Down Friends"	John May & Suzanne Bolch	March 13, 2015	March 15, 2015	114	N/A
A bat befriends Flare.
14a	"Zip Zoom Broom"	Brian Hartigan	August 4, 2015	March 22, 2015	115	0.65
Hazel decides to pilot a very powerful broom assembled by her father to prove his ability as a broom pilot.
14b	"Sheepover Party"	Brian Hartigan	August 4, 2015	March 22, 2015	115	0.65
Sheep are counted to try and sleep at a sleepover.
15	"Sparkle Bunny"	John May & Suzanne Bolch	April 3, 2015	March 29, 2015	116	N/A
An Easter themed episode.
16a	"Bean There, Done That" "Bean There Done That"	John May & Suzanne Bolch	August 11, 2015	April 5, 2015	117	0.55
16b	"Charmville Unchained"	Dan Williams & Lienne Sawatsky	August 11, 2015	April 5, 2015	117	0.55
17a	"Frankenflare"	Brian Hartigan	August 6, 2015	March 29, 2015	116	0.40
When Flare gets giant and cause a fog with her dragon hiccups, the charmers had to turn her to normal size.
17b	"Charming Cheers"	John May & Suzanne Bolch	August 6, 2015	March 29, 2015	116	0.40
18a	"My Charmhouse is Your Charmhouse" "My Charmhouse Is Your Charmhouse"	Steve Sullivan	August 13, 2015	April 19, 2015	119	0.67
Nelson Gnome is invited by the Charmers to come to live in the Charmhouse after they accidentally destroy his home.
18b	"Frog For a Day"	Steve Sullivan	August 13, 2015	April 19, 2015	119	0.67
19a	"Charm Your Mom Day" "Charm Your Mom"	Brian Hartigan	or May 8, 2015	May 5, 2015	121	N/A
A Mother's Day themed episode.
19b	"A Charming Campout"	John May & Suzanne Bolch	May 8, 2015	May 5, 2015	121	N/A
Mr. Charming teaches wilderness navigation.
20	"Spooky Pumpkin Moon Night"	John May & Suzanne Bolch	October 21, 2015 on Nick	October 23, 2015, on Treehouse	108	0.57
On Spooky Pumpkin Moon Night, when magic can't be used or troubles will happen, Mrs. Charming unsuccessfully tries to bake without magic. After failing to collect more candy than Parsely, who received extra candy by wearing a second head on his costume, which he pretends to be his friend, Hazel tries to beat him to choosing the biggest pumpkin. When Parsley wins that race too, Hazel breaks the no magic rule by enchanting her pumpkin with magic to make it bigger. It not only grows larger than expected, but also gains arms and an insatiable appetite for any object it can reach. To solve the problem the Charmers use bakery ingredients to transform the pumpkin into pumpkin pie for everyone in Charmville.
21a	"A Charming Wedding"	Brian Hartigan	August 18, 2015	September 5, 2015	120	0.41
21b	"A Snug Little Rug" "Snug Little Rug"	Dan Williams & Lienne Sawatsky	August 18, 2015	September 5, 2015	120	0.41
22a	"Somewhere Over The Rainbow" "Somewhere Over the Rainbow"	John May & Suzanne Bolch	August 20, 2015	September 11, 2015	122	0.39
Hazel becomes a unicorn to teach a baby unicorn named Lulu how to jump rainbows.
22b	"Circus Surprise"	Steve Sullivan	August 20, 2015	September 11, 2015	122	0.39
23	"Magical Mistakes"	Brian Hartigan	August 22, 2015	September 21, 2015	N/A	0.36
A recap episode showing old footage of magical mistakes Hazel made.
24	"Musical Moments"	Brian Hartigan	August 22, 2015	September 22, 2015	N/A	0.38
A recap episode showing old footage of songs from previous stories.
25a	"Sing Song Pox"	Steve Sullivan	October 26, 2015	September 18, 2015	123	0.65
25b	"Tooth on the Loose" "A Tooth on the Loose"	Brian Hartigan	October 26, 2015	September 18, 2015	123	0.65
26a	"Hurry Up Hazel"	Brian Hartigan	October 28, 2015	September 25, 2015	125	0.52
Hazel speeds herself up to rush through enchantress lessons so she can play with friends.
26b	"No Charm in the House"	John May and Suzanne Bolch	October 28, 2015	September 25, 2015	125	0.52
The Charmhouse won't let the girls in, so they ask the Enchantress what's up, but miss out on the important bits, and go to the Sparkle Tree to get Sparkle Glue until they figure out love is the answer. Note: The encounter with the Sparkle Tree is referenced by Hazel in "The Magic of Charmville", a recap episode which aired 1 day prior to this in Canada.
27a	"Charming Nightlights"	John May & Suzanne Bolch	October 29, 2015	October 2, 2015	126	0.49
The girls make the sun vanish, and moths and frogs become attracted to them when they spill neon green goo all over their bodies.
27b	"Charming Babies"	Brian Hartigan	October 29, 2015	October 2, 2015	126	0.49
The girls babysit Thistle, the infant younger brother of Posie.
28a	"Unicorn Without a Horn"	Steve Sullivan	November 30, 2015	October 9, 2015	127	0.93
28b	"All Stirred Up" "Stir Crazy Charmer"	John May and Suzanne Bolch	November 30, 2015	October 9, 2015	127	0.93
29a	"A Charming Mistake"	Michael Stokes	December 1, 2015	October 16, 2015	128	0.71
29b	"A Charming Surprise Birthday"	Anita Kapila	December 1, 2015	October 16, 2015	128	0.71
30a	"Dad's Hat Magic" "Old School Magic"	John May and Suzanne Bolch	October 27, 2015	June 17, 2016	124	0.57
30b	"Charming Ogres"	John May and Suzanne Bolch	October 27, 2015	June 17, 2016	124	0.57
31a	"Wandering Wand"	Michael Stokes	November 5, 2015 or December 2, 2015	November 6, 2015	129	0.44
31b	"Good Knight, Good Day"	John May & Suzanne Bolch	November 5, 2015 or December 2, 2015	November 6, 2015	129	0.44
The Charmers strike a deal with Parsely: he will play the knight in their princess game and later they will play Brooms and Ogres together. But since Parsley tries to rush things because he really prefers to play Broom and Ogres, the Charmers try to cast a spell on him to make him more heroic.
32a	"Band on the Run"	John May & Suzanne Bolch	November 12, 2015 or December 3, 2015	November 13, 2015	131	0.59
The Charmers reform their Rainbow Sparkle band so they can cheer up an ill Mrs.Charming with a musical performance.
32b	"Picture Perfect Posie"	Anita Kapila	November 12, 2015 or December 3, 2015	November 13, 2015	131	0.59
Posie is trapped in a picture by magic.
33	"Pet Friends Forever"	Unknown	August 30, 2015	September 23, 2015	N/A	N/A
A recap of pet moments from previous episodes. (Not to be confused with the earlier episode "Pest Friends Forever".)
34	"The Magic of Charmville"	Unknown	September 11, 2015	September 24, 2015	N/A	N/A
A recap of magic moments from previous episodes.
35a	"Forget Me Not"	Brian Hartigan	November 19, 2015	November 20, 2015	132	N/A
35b	"Nelson In Charge"	John May & Suzanne Bolch	November 19, 2015	November 20, 2015	132	N/A
The Charmers are being babysat by Nelson.
36a	"Glass Slipper"	Steve Sullivan	November 26, 2015	November 27, 2015	133	N/A
36b	"Hazel, You Shrunk The Charmers!"	John May & Suzanne Bolch	November 26, 2015	November 27, 2015	133	N/A
During a break from homework the Charmers are shrunk in the garden and their now smaller wands have too little magic to make them return to normal. Eventually they catch the attention of the Enchantress who fixes the problem.
37	"Santa Sparkle"	John May & Suzanne Bolch	December 11, 2015	December 15, 2015	130	0.73
38a	"Hazel-Nuts"	Ashley Lannigan	January 1, 2016	December 16, 2015	134	N/A
Hazel makes magical bracelets and enchants them so people will love them, but she hazels the spell and the magic enchants the wearer to become an exaggerated fan of Hazel herself. Everyone begins copying her and she eventually gets tired of it. Eventually she figures out that by taking off her own bracelet and pretending it is out of fashion, everyone else follows suit, freeing themselves from the spell.
38b	"Charming Cookies"	Steve Sullivan	January 1, 2016	December 16, 2015	134	N/A
39a	"A Charming Story"	Anita Kapila	January 8, 2016	January 8, 2016	135	N/A
The group discusses Ruby Sparkle. She is the favourite Super-Charmer of Lavender and Posie says she can turn invisible and walk through walls and always saves the day. Not wanting the fun to end at the conclusion of the novel, the Charmers summon Ruby to their own world. To her chagrin, her powers do not function in Charmville. Asking Hazel's mom for help, the Enchantress explains that her powers are tied to her world, just like the Charmers' magic would not work in Ruby's world. Ruby wants to stay in spite of this until the Charmers discover that Ruby's story is disappearing without her. Fearing the loss of her friend Tiny (she is vanishing as well) Ruby consents to return to the book.
39b	"Magic Mishap" "Machic Mishap"	Anita Kapila	January 8, 2016	January 8, 2016	135	N/A
The sparkle needed to work magic is lost. While Hazel's mom is busy brewing potions to cure the magical maladies that the town's populace suffer, the Charmers ride their dysfunctional brooms to the top of a nearby mountain to find the fairies, the source of the sparkles needed to work magic, to discern the problem. Upon arrival, they discover 3 fairies (Alvie and Belinda and Iris) arguing over who gets to keep a gemstone. They are informed by a fourth non-fighting fairy named Enid that this had been going on a while. Trying to copy the gemstone so they could each have one, they accidentally turn it into 3 frogs due to wand malfunction. Eventually, they decide to give the fairies their friendship lockets so their shininess will make them happy.
40a	"Posie's Pesky Potion"	Ashley Lannigan	April 11, 2016	January 15, 2016	136	N/A
Posie tries her hand at potions (Lavender's specialty) for a Charm School assignment but fails and instead of brewing a happiness potion, makes Charmville residents depressed instead. Eventually she tries a happiness spell using her forte, music, and fixes the problem. Her teacher applauds this in spite of her deviating from the instructions for the school project.
40b	"Sparklestorm Adventure" "Sparkle Storm Adventure"	Brian Hartigan	April 11, 2016	January 15, 2016	136	N/A
A rampaging Sparklestorm descends upon Charmville, threatening to steal all its sounds and encase it in silence. The Enchantress needs the most beautiful song ever heard as a spell component to disrupt the storm, so her daughter and her two friends seek it out. Posie recalls her childhood music wizard Mr. Carol telling her that fairies are the most talented. In attempting to summon fairies from Mount Sparklemore, the Charmers accidentally turn themselves into fairies. When they find a Fairy Cave they are greeted by Fairy Dahlia who agrees to help them with their problem. She forms a choir with two other fairies, and Posie joins in with her flute. They manage to store the song in a magic jar just before the storm steals the fairy trio's voices. Meanwhile the Enchantress is listening to townsfolk and rejects the ogress Freda's horn music. She is in the middle of politely rejecting her husband's one man band when the Charmers return, dodging lightning bolts. Lightning zaps the jar out of Hazel's hands and it falls open on the ground, the fairy's tune escaping useless into the air. Posie makes up for Hazel's failure by remembering the song, and her performance on her flute is enough to fuel the Enchantress' spell, who completes it while protecting Posie from the sound-snatching spell using a magical force bubble. The disaster abated, the Charmers get permission from the Enchantress to stay fairies a while longer, and have fun playing fairy tag.
41a	"Bigger, Better, Broomier!" "Bigger Better Broomier!"	Steve Sullivan	January 22, 2016	January 22, 2016	139	N/A
41b	"Night Owls"	John May & Suzanne Bolch	January 22, 2016	January 29, 2016	139	N/A
42a	"A Charmazing Race" "A Charming Race"	John May & Suzanne Bolch	January 29, 2016	January 29, 2016	138	N/A
42b	"Dragon Daycare"	Steve Sullivan	January 29, 2016	January 29, 2016	138	N/A
43a	"Sparkleberry Pies"	Unknown	March 11, 2016	March 11, 2016	140	N/A
43b	"Wishing Fish"	Unknown	March 11, 2016	March 11, 2016	140	N/A
44	"A Charmazing Mermaid Tale"	Steve Sullivan	August 14, 2016	January 22, 2016	137	N/A

=== Season 2 (2017) ===
No. overall	No. in season	Title	Written by	Canadian air date	U.S. air date	Prod. code	US viewers (millions)
45a	1a	"Hopping Ballerinas"	Anita Kapila	April 10, 2017	January 1, 2019	TBA	N/A
When the girls are practicing for a ballet performance, Hazel doesn't know what's wrong with her feet. She then uses magic and turns them into butter-frogs.
45b	1b	"Wishing Well"	Karen Moonah	April 10, 2017	January 1, 2019	TBA	N/A
Hazel steals gems from a wishing well and makes them into a necklace for her mom's birthday. However, this endangers Gingerbread Boy's life by cancelling his wish for others to not eat him.
46a	2a	"The Return of Ruby Sparkle"	Steve Sullivan	April 11, 2017	January 2, 2019	TBA	N/A
As the Charmers read a novel, they decide to give Ruby Sparkles a despite her quest to guard jewels from Gertrude the Greedy Goblin and summon her for a vacation in Charmville. Gertrude the Goblin manages to escape through the portal and begins stealing shine everywhere. Mr. Charming attempts to guard The Enchantress' royal tiara but when Goblin Gertrude filches it, Hazel quests to get her mom's crown back.
46b	2b	"Posie Bird"	Steve Sullivan	April 11, 2017	January 2, 2019	TBA	N/A
Posie gets accidentally turned into a bird by Hazel, this turns out to be helpful in catching a gang of broom straw thieves. Everyone builds shiny birdhouses.
47a	3a	"Egg Treble"	Karen Moonah	April 12, 2017	January 3, 2019	TBA	N/A
Hazel tries to rewind time to unshatter a potion but regresses Posie's pet bird Treble into an egg. Farmer Ben tells the girls they must guard Treble until she hatches again. Pickles tries to sit on the egg.
47b	3b	"Missing Mermaid Message"	Brian Hartigan	April 12, 2017	January 3, 2019	TBA	N/A
The girls open a bottle and hear a message from a person named Splish for someone named Chanty. They automatically assume both sender and recipient are female even though it is gender neutral. When the message escapes, they memorize it and try to find the sender. They meet with their old octopus friend Hector and he is with Princess Corina, also glad to see them. Although neither know who Splish is, Hector recommends Salty the Sea Turtle who knows a lot by being a hundred years old. Turns out he is only 99.5 but does know that Splish was the childhood nickname of Corona's mom. When Splish comments that Hazel resembles her childhood friend, they guess Chanty is Hazel's mom, The Enchantress, who meets the girls at the beach, having captured the escaped note. The girls deliver a return message from Chanty to Splish returning the friendship and inviting her for a visit.
48a	4a	"Goo Goo Ga Ga Charmer"	Anita Kapila	April 13, 2017	January 4, 2019	TBA	N/A
The girls want to play Bubbles and Brooms on Charmer Super Fun Day, but Hazel had already promised her mom to help with something. They lose track of time, so not having learned a lesson with her previous dabblings with time travel, in attempting to rewind the day, Hazel changes herself into a toddler instead. Only a hug from a baby will change her back, so they go to the baby ogre Swampkin's first birthday party at 1 o'clock and after Hazel makes a muddy gift, he hugs her and brings her back to her original age.
48b	4b	"Hide and Eeeek!"	Steve Sullivan	April 13, 2017	January 4, 2019	TBA	N/A
When the girls play hide and seek, they hide in the Charmhouse and cast a spell to put it out of sight. This makes it float above the clouds, and they have to figure out how to get help, since they are out of range of their mirrorphones. They end up dying the cloud colours, being noisy, and being rescued.
49a	5a	"Paper Puppets Away"	Brian Hartigan	April 14, 2017	January 7, 2019	TBA	N/A
The girls are assigned a puppet-making project, but Hazel's ends up looking more like an ogre than her. She then accidentally turns Posie and Lavender into paper puppets. When Pickles takes them, Hazel is aided by Willow into making her puppet look even more ogre-like, and convinces Pickles to trade the girls for it instead. When Greensparkle is informed how Hazel's puppet saved them, she says that the puppet does resemble Hazel after all.
49b	5b	"The Trouble with Sprokolli"	Brian Hartigan	April 14, 2017	January 7, 2019	TBA	N/A
To avoid having to eat sprokolli, Hazel spells it to vanish. It then starts popping up all over the place, and the girls end up eating a bunch of it to avoid having Hazel's parents figure out their deception. Once full, they begin cooking it to make jams. Mrs. Charming knew all along, but waited until they admitted what they did, and made it all vanish, saying she had done a similar thing as a girl.
50a	6a	"Frozen Greensicles"	Katherine Sandford	April 15, 2017	January 8, 2019	TBA	N/A
On the last day of school, with summer beginning, the girls are afraid they will be split up the next year into different classes and lose their favourite teacher, Mrs. Greensparkle. They cast a spell to freeze time so they can be together forever. The spell instead freezes the entire town, including changing Greensparkle into a "Greensicle".. When they notice a nearly-kissing Mr. & Mrs. Charming melting in the sunlight, the girls relocate all the frozen townsfolk to the beach where the heat frees them from their icy prisons. Mrs. Greensparkle informs them she will be teaching them the following year and they'll remain in the same class.
50b	6b	"Mouse in the Charmhouse"	Brian Hartigan	April 15, 2017	January 8, 2019	TBA	N/A
When the girls find a golden apple, they learn they must split the apple perfectly into equal portions and eat it before sundown to be friends forever, or else they will lose their friendship. A mouse steals the apple and they shrink and invade his hole to get it back. It turns out that the mouse named Gordon is actually a gnome transformed against his will into a Borrow Mouse by a fairy who he had borrowed something from and not returned it. After returning one item, they realize that he will regain his original form bit by bit as he gives things he borrowed back, including Mrs. Charming's hairpin whose absence had left her bangs continually hitting her in the face.
51a	7a	"Magic Flute"	Anita Kapila	April 15, 2017	January 9, 2019	TBA	N/A
Posie's flute loses its magic and the girls need to collect sounds to restore it.
51b	7b	"Pump Down the Volume"	Steve Sullivan	April 15, 2017	January 9, 2019	TBA	N/A
When Parsely is put into the girls' band, they get irritated at his taking over and magically mute his voice. To restore it, they must attain harmony, and they do so by having him dance to their music.
52	8	"A Charmer Fairytale"	Steve Sullivan	April 10, 2017	January 10, 2019	TBA	N/A
The girls get bored with fairytales so they mix 3 stories into one. Princess and the Pea has popcorn instead of a pea, Goldilocks and the Three Bears becomes 5 bears, and The Three Little Pigs becomes pig princesses. They must obey the whims of Parsely to be able to be released from the book.
53a	9a	"A Little Too Much Parsley"	Kyle Hart	April 11, 2017	January 11, 2019	TBA	N/A
When Hazel tries to make Parsley see things her way, they end up switching bodies.
53b	9b	"The Switch Ups"	Kyle Hart	April 11, 2017	January 11, 2019	TBA	N/A
54a	10a	"Charmersaurus Hex"	Brian Hartigan	April 12, 2017	January 14, 2019	TBA	N/A
54b	10b	"An Enchanting Mess"	Katherine Sandford	April 12, 2017	January 14, 2019	TBA	N/A
55a	11a	"In Bed by Seven"	Anita Kapila	April 13, 2017	January 15, 2019	TBA	N/A
55b	11b	"Castle in the Clouds"	Brian Hartigan	April 13, 2017	January 15, 2019	TBA	N/A
56a	12a	"Charming Unicorns"	Kyle Hart	April 14, 2017	January 16, 2019	TBA	N/A
56b	12b	"Bubble Bubble Giant Trouble"	Anita Kapila	April 14, 2017	January 16, 2019	TBA	N/A
57	13	"Charmazing Pirates"	Steve Sullivan	April 15, 2017	January 17, 2019	TBA	N/A
The Charmers' search for Hazel's lost tiara leads them into the land of the pirates.
