= Colin Penman =

Canadian make-up artist

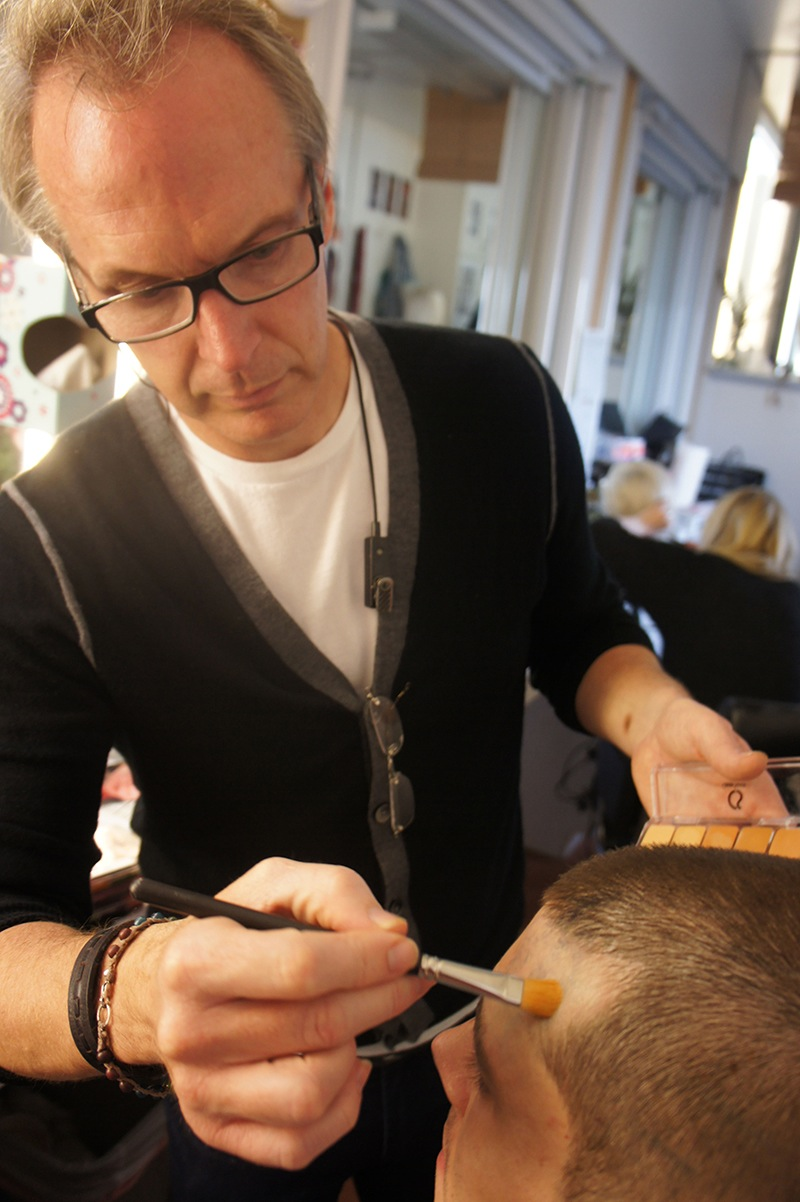
Colin Penman in the makeup trailer on Defiance 2012

Colin Penman (born September 8, 1967) is a Canadian makeup artist and makeup effects artist. In 2011, he won a Prime Time Emmy Award and received a Gemini nomination for his work on The Kennedys. Other notable credits include work on the feature films Pacific Rim, Total Recall, Hairspray and the Saw franchise. Television credits include Monsters, Defiance, Copper, The Strain and Killjoys.

== Personal life ==
Penman was born in Toronto, Ontario. At age sixteen, he moved to Simi Valley, California. In 1988, Penman attended The Institute Of Studio Makeup, in Studio City, and promptly entered the makeup effects industry in Hollywood. Penman has since returned to living in Toronto and has also worked in South Africa, Brazil, Malta, India and Sri Lanka. He is married with two children.

== Teaching ==
Influenced by legendary makeup artist Dick Smith's willingness to share information and techniques, Penman has been instructing artists for many years. He was a regular instructor at Complections International from 1991-1996 and 2001-2008. Penman is also a regular speaker for Sheridan College and has conducted seminars at the IMATS trade shows and FanExpo in Toronto.

== Puppeteering ==
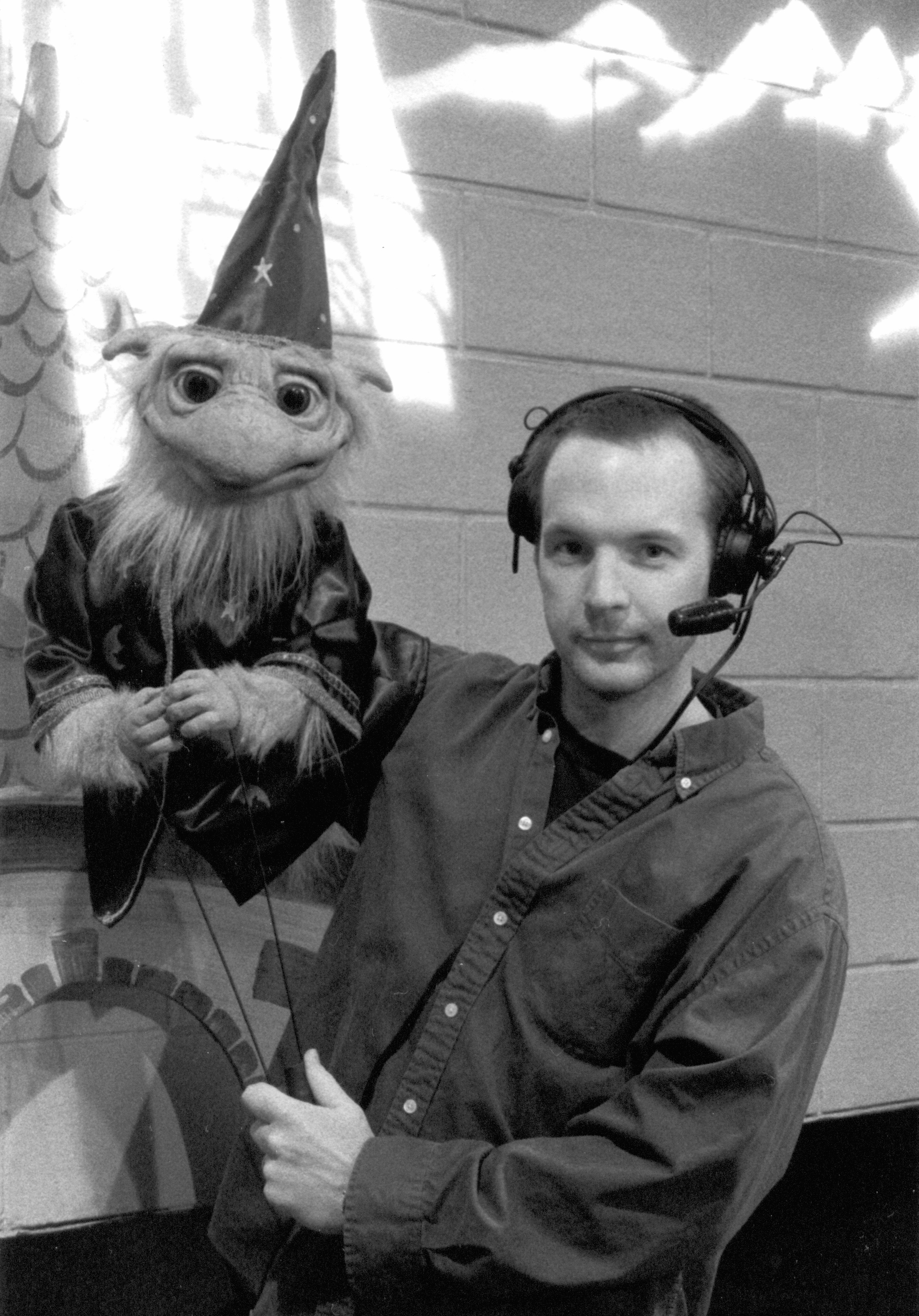
Colin Penman and Buella on the set of Fuzz Paws 1999

Puppeteering and performance often go hand in hand with the Makeup Effects and Creature Effects industry. Penman has always enjoyed bringing creations to life, whether by remote control or rods. He got his first taste of performing in a full body costume on the series Monsters, playing a simian like alter ego in the episode "Murray's Monster". In 1998, after completing a workshop with veteran puppeteer Rob Mills, Penman landed the roles of "Buella" on the series Fuzz Paws, "Dusty" on Ants in Your Pants and "Margaret The Elf" on Santa Calls. All three shows were produced by YTV. These were the only characters Penman also voiced.

== Awards ==
=== Emmy Award ===
The Kennedys
