= The Fuzzpaws =

Canadian children's television characters

All seven Fuzzpaws.

The Fuzzpaws are a group of seven puppets which co-hosted the Treehouse programming block on YTV in the 1990s. When the block was cancelled in 1998 in favor of an unhosted block called YTV Jr., the Fuzzpaws got their own television series and a marketed toy line. All of the Fuzzpaws live in a fictional place called "Pawville". The series was cancelled in 1999 after two seasons.

== Characters ==
- Archie is a yellow Fuzzpaw with green hair. His favorite food is a specialty dish only made by his mom called Deep Fried Fishy Face. He enjoys singing, dancing, and acting and one day would like to be a "big star".
- Boon is a green and yellow Fuzzpaw with yellow hair. He has a surfer-style personality He claims to live in a basement apartment, but with no house on top. He has a pet rutabaga named "Rodney". Sometimes he does "primal screams" to relieve stress. His hobbies include skateboarding and snowboarding. Boon plays the harmonica in a rock band named "Jungle Cow". His best friend is JB. Whenever his name would appear on the screen, he would put his eyes in each of the O's and shout "BOON GOGGLES!"
- Buella is a human-like "Unpaw", a relative of the Fuzzpaws, with yellow skin, grey hair, and a hat.
- Fazz is a brown and pink Fuzzpaw with yellow lips, gold hair and a red bow. She is best friends with Fezz, and claims that they are absolutely in a relationship. She enjoys playing pretend, drawing, playing sports, and reading about cars and motorcycles. Someday she would like to race motorcycles.
- Fezz is a blue and red Fuzzpaw with yellow hair and an orange beak. He is five years old, loves cookies, and his favorite music is Hip hop. He has an ambition of becoming a truck driver when he gets older. In Pawville he lives with Foster. His best friend is Fazz.
- Foster is a blue, yellow, and green Fuzzpaw with black hair. He says that his favorite thing in the world is music. He is the singer for an R&B band in Pawville, which makes the Fuzzpaws consider him a star. His favorite foods are pizza, hamburgers, and vegetables. He invited Fezz to live with him when he needed a place to stay.
- JB is a yellow and black bee who wears sunglasses. He was born a normal larva to the queen bee in a normal hive, and later moved to Pawville where he built a mansion. He says that his arch rival is Boon because Boon calls him "that little bug dude".

== Cast ==
- Marty Stelnick
- Jason Hopley
- Colin Penman
- Ben Deustch
