= PJ Katie's Farm =

Canadian children's television series

PJ Katie's Farm is a Canadian-British children's television series featuring the live action manipulation of Crayola Model Magic figures and was hosted, narrated, acted, voiced, and improvised by actress Jennifer Racicot as PJ Katie.

The series was originally developed from interstitial segments on YTV's preschool block, The Treehouse, before becoming its own series in 1995. The show also aired on the separate Treehouse TV channel in 1999.

== Format ==
The series took place in front of the little barn made from popsicle sticks on top of a long tabletop, that sometimes extended out to other settings, such as a large crater where eggs from outer space landed.

PJ Katie voiced all of the animals.

== Music ==
The theme song was sung by Racicot herself, and most episodes were introduced with her yelling "You are here for PJKTYSFRMPJKTYSFRMPJKTYSFRM!".

=== Theme song lyrics ===
On Katie's Farm, imagination's the rule,
Dippe the cat, so calm and cool;
Demi and Darci and Ed come along,
Delilah the Cow she's everyone's mom;
Bryce the Collie barks and runs free,
while Blue the Horse naps under a tree;
Percival pig just squeals all the time!
Rosebeekie hamster whiiiines!
Join the gang for adventures and fun,
Katie's farm is for everyone!

== Rights bought by Nelvana ==
In 1998, Nelvana bought distribution rights to the entire series. However, they have not distributed the series since then.
