= Get Real! =

Get Real! is a reality themed programming block on the Canadian television channel YTV. It premiered September 8, 2007, and broadcasts on Saturdays from 6:00 p.m. to 8:00 p.m. ET. Starting in 2008, the block also airs on Fridays, from the same time as the Saturday airing. Friday also became the night for premiere episodes of shows in the block, it now serves as a transition from YTV's The Zone block, into Bionix.

This block is no longer formally airing in a specific timeslot on YTV.

The shows that aired within the block are now grouped together and airing on different days throughout the schedule.

== Programs Broadcast on Get Real! ==
- The Adrenaline Project
- Ghost Trackers
- Mystery Hunters
- Prank Patrol
- Endurance (TV series)
