= Ants in Your Pants =

- Genre: Children's television series Music video
- Created by: Kathilee Porter
- Developed by: Treehouse TV
- Written by: Kathilee Porter; Bryan Levy Young; Kim Sparks; Rachel Bartels
- Creative director: Kathilee Porter
- Presented by: Shelley Hamilton; Corey Michaels; Douglas John
- Voices of: Marty Stelnick; Jason Hopley; Ben Deustch; Colin Penman
- Theme music composer: Douglas John
- Opening theme: "Ants in Your Pants Theme Song"
- Ending theme: "Ants in Your Pants Theme Song (Instrumental)"
- Composer: Douglas John
- Country of origin: Canada
- Original language: English
- No. of seasons: 3
- No. of episodes: 107

Production
- Executive producer: Susan Ross
- Producer: Kathilee Porter
- Production locations: Toronto, Ontario
- Cinematography: Shawn Kelly; Andrew Baxter
- Editor: Marc Dupont
- Running time: 27 minutes
- Production company: YTV Productions

Original release
- Network: Treehouse TV
- Release: October 3, 1997 – August 16, 2001

Ants in Your Pants is a Canadian children's music video television program made and aired by Treehouse TV that ran from November 1, 1997 to June 16, 2000. The series was created and produced by Kathilee Porter.

== Format ==
The show's intro consists mostly of CGI animations with the "Ants In Your Pants" theme, written by children's music artist Douglas John, whose music videos also appear on the show.

The host, a puppet monkey in corduroy overalls, named Lickety Split, then takes over. He lives in a tree with his mother (who is not seen, only heard or mentioned). He usually explains what he has been doing lately. A music video is shown. Usually, there are three music videos, separated by Lickety segments. After the last music video is played, an image of scattered leaves is shown before the next Lickety segment.

In the second segment, the Pesky Carpenter Ants, named Chainsaw, Woodchip and Dusty, are introduced. They frequently cause trouble for Lickety, but can also be helpful and kind on rare occasions.

In the third season, "Kidding Around" and "Stretch and Wiggle" are presented. "Kidding Around" features a CGI video camera showing kids doing fun activities or singing songs. "Stretch and Wiggle" (hosted by Shelley Hamilton and Corey Michaels, and sometimes Douglas John) shows exercises. The last segment before the end of the show is titled "Lickety's Tree Fort" and features a guest star. Guest stars include Al Simmons, Bob McGrath, Carmen Campagne, Jack Grunsky, Jackie Richardson accompanied with her pianist Danny McErlain, and Ken Whiteley.

== Cast ==
- Marty Stelnick as Lickety Split
- Jason Hopley, Ben Deutsch, Colin Penman as Janesaw, Woodchip, and Dusty

== Soundtrack ==
Ants In Your Pants - Volume 1

Soundtrack album by Douglas John
- Released: August 1998
- Genre: Children's music
- Label: ZepLenz
- Producer: Douglas John

No.	Title	Artist	Length
1.	"Ants in Your Pants"	Douglas John	2:51
2.	"Ug a Bug"	Douglas John	2:27
3.	"Ooey Gooey"	Dutch Robinson	2:58
4.	"The Wiggle"	Douglas John	2:08
5.	"Barnyard Symfunny"	The Barnyard Orchestra	2:06
6.	"Inky Dinky Spider"	Leigh Powell	2:38
7.	"Let's Talk Turkey"	Douglas John	2:17
8.	"Baa Lu"	The Barnyard Chorus	3:35
9.	"Aram Sam Sam"	Dutch Robinson	2:29
10.	"Do Your Socks Get Soggy?"	Douglas John & MacHeel	3:31
11.	"Woogie Boogie"	Jude Johnson	2:39
12.	"If I Were Not a Little Kid"	Martha Johnson	3:36
13.	"Tomato Hat"	Justin Hines	2:45

== Reception ==
The soundtrack of Ants in Your Pants was a nominee in 2000 for Juno Award for Children's Album of the Year. A music video of "Do Your Socks Get Soggy" by Douglas John on YouTube had more than 100,000 views as of January 2017.

== See also ==
- The Big Comfy Couch
- Elliot Moose
- Wimzie's House
- Groundling Marsh
- Elmo's World
