= Crunch (TV programming block) =

Canadian television programming block

CRUNCH
- Network: YTV
- Launched: September 9, 2006; 19 years ago
- Closed: September 28, 2013; 12 years ago
- Country of origin: Canada
- Headquarters: Toronto, Ontario, Canada
- Running time: Saturdays 7:00am–12:00pm

CRUNCH was a former Saturday morning programming block dedicated to animation on the Canadian television channel YTV. CRUNCH premiered on September 9, 2006, replacing The Zone Summer Weekends hosted by Sugar and Carlos, and "Vortex" hosted by Paula. From its beginning until mid September 2008, it was hosted by Ajay Fry. Starting October 4, 2008, Andy Chapman (not to be confused with Andy from the YTV show, Prank Patrol) became the host.

The theme of the new programming block was a new holiday called "day 6", where there is no homework, chores or hobbies, such as music classes which could interrupt a kid's day during the hours of 7:00 a.m. to 12:00 p.m. (the hours that the CRUNCH programming block aired). YTV promoted the new programming block by inviting kids to download a kit which included door hangers informing others that day 6 was on and no chores and homework were being completed. There were also flyers which contained many of the programming block's slogans and a large notebook poster.

The hosted portions of CRUNCH were different than other programming blocks. Rather than having a host talk for 5 minutes after a show, it was divided into two parts: one during the second commercial break, and one during the credits. Crunch also used special on-screen bugs. Sister block The Zone followed its footsteps on September 3, 2007.

The block ended on September 28, 2013, and was replaced by The Zone Weekend the following week.

== See also ==
- List of shows on CRUNCH
