= YTV Jr. =

Former Canadian Programming Block

- Network: YTV
- Launched: 1994; 32 years ago
- Closed: 2002; 24 years ago
- Country of origin: Canada
- Headquarters: Toronto, Ontario, Canada
- Formerly known as: The Treehouse (1994–98)
- Format: Children's programming block
- Running time: 6.5 hours (1994–99); 5.5 hours (1999–2002)

YTV Jr. (formerly known as The Treehouse) was a block on YTV for preschoolers that was launched in 1994 and aired weekdays until 2002.

== History ==
When YTV launched, it had a block of programs for preschoolers with a focus on Canadian content. In 1991, YTV began airing host segments during the block featuring their PJs (Program Jockeys) and the Grogs (replaced by The Fuzzpaws in 1994).

In 1994, YTV's preschool block received the name The Treehouse. While most of YTV's hosted blocks had one or two hosts, The Treehouse was hosted by one or two of three PJs, Katie, Krista, and/or Todd, and one of The Fuzzpaws. As the name suggests, it was set in a tree house. On Fridays, PJ Katie would act out stories with clay animals; these segments were eventually spun off into the series PJ Katie's Farm. Following the launch of Treehouse TV in 1997, The Treehouse received new bumpers and a new set.

YTV relaunched The Treehouse on September 7, 1998 as YTV Jr. The Treehouse host segments were replaced with short series (some produced by YTV in-house) and promos. The Fuzzpaws got their own short series on YTV Jr., and PJ Katie became Jenny on The Zone. YTV dropped the YTV Jr. branding from its morning lineup in mid-2002. From 2010 to 2012, YTV aired YTV PlayTime, a three-hour commercial-free block of animated series for older preschoolers.
