= William's Wish Wellingtons =

- Created by: Carole Lapworth
- Written by: Mark Holloway
- Directed by: Graham Ralph
- Starring: Andrew Sachs
- Music by: Kick Production
- Country of origin: United Kingdom
- No. of series: 2
- No. of episodes: 26

Production
- Producers: John Cary; Karen Davidsen
- Editor: M2 Facilities
- Running time: 5 minutes
- Production company: Hibbert Ralph Entertainment

Original release
- Network: Children's BBC on: BBC1 (episodes 1–12 and 21–26); BBC2 (episodes 13–20)
- Release: 25 October 1994 – 13 December 1996

William's Wish Wellingtons is an animated BBC children's television series produced by Hibbert Ralph Entertainment (who had previously created Spider!). It initially aired on BBC One from 25 October to 30 December 1994, then moved to BBC Two on 24 December 1995 for the season 1 finale and from 19 April to 31 May 1996 for the first seven episodes of season 2, and moved back to BBC One from 25 September to 13 December 1996 for the remainder of season 1. It was narrated by actor Andrew Sachs. It was later translated into Gaelic by Búrach Productions with a different narrator and shown as Botannan Araid Uilleim on BBC Two Scotland. It was shown in the United States as part of Cartoon Network's Big Bag (but, when Big Bag was remade by Yorkshire Television in the United Kingdom, it was replaced with Koki given that it was on ITV).

The central theme of the series is similar to The Galoshes of Fortune (1838) by Hans Christian Andersen.

== Synopsis ==
In the series' first episode, William and Barksure, William decided to go outside to play in the rain; when his Mum saw him (and the state of his shoes) she took him to buy a new pair of Wellington boots, and when they arrived at the shoe shop the shop owner picked out a pair of sparkling red boots for William. When he got home and decided to put them on, he discovered a note inside: "These are Wish Wellingtons, put them on and make a wish" – and when he did so, the first thing he wished for was a dog, which he christened "Barksure". William then realized that he had the power to wish himself anywhere in the world, or ask for anything he wanted; this sometimes got him into a spot of bother, such as the occasion when he wished that he had the biggest conker in the world in order to win his school conker championship, the time when he wished all his toys alive to help him tidy his room, or the time when he put his Wellingtons on the wrong feet and almost prevented Santa Claus from making his deliveries one Christmas Eve (with a series of wishes gone wrong). He also changed the course of history several times, such as the occasion when he wished himself back to ancient Rome and beat a soldier called Superbus in a chariot race (by wishing for a banquet to thwart Superbus's progress, as he immediately stopped his chariot and started eating it).

The series comprised twenty-six five-minute episodes; thirteen in 1994 and a further thirteen in 1996, which were storyboarded and animated by Mark Mason (who had previously animated The Raggy Dolls) and directed by Graham Ralph (who had previously directed Spider! and illustrated its book).

== Merchandise ==
The inceptive series was released by BBC Worldwide on a VHS entitled William and Barksure (BBCV 5666) in 1995 and the second series on another VHS entitled William Hood (BBCV 5904) in 1996. These are both now out of print; as with many other older BBC children's television shows, the show is not available on DVD.

There were also several books based on the show (some of the ones that were based on the episodes changed their titles, such as "William and Barksure" becoming "William and the Dog", "William and the Alien" becoming "William in Space", "William of Arabia" becoming "William and the Camel", "Jungle William" becoming "William in the Jungle", and, "William the Storyteller", which was one of only two episodes to feature William's orange-haired cousin Winston, becoming "William and the Giant"), which were written or adapted by Atholl McDonald, and illustrated by director Graham Ralph; one was a peep-through book, while another was a colouring book, and a third was an activity book.

In 1998, part of the episode "William the Conkeror" was featured in an eighth-series episode of Bodger and Badger (when they ran the "Seagull's Rest" bed-and-breakfast); Badger (and Mousey) wanted to watch it in one of their guests' rooms while she was watching the weather forecast, so they switched the channel with their remote (while they were hiding in the back of the room), and after she changed it back with her own remote, they changed it again. The changing went on until the guest complained to Bodger that her TV was defective. Ethelbert the Tiger

== Episode list ==
=== Series 1 (1994) ===
This season was originally produced in 1994.

The first eight episodes of the first series were originally broadcast on BBC One as a part of the Children's BBC strand on Tuesdays and Thursdays at 3:35 pm, while the next four were broadcast on the Tuesday, Wednesday, Thursday, and Friday after Christmas 1994 at 10:20 am, and the thirteenth one was broadcast on BBC Two almost a year later on Christmas Eve 1995 at 7:30 am, after a rerun of six of the previous twelve; this is due to the fact that its plot featured William almost preventing Santa Claus from making his deliveries.

No.	Title	Original release date
1	"William and Barksure"	25 October 1994
2	"Shrinking William"	27 October 1994
3	"William the Conkeror"	1 November 1994
4	"Pirate William"	3 November 1994
5	"William's Big Tidy Up"	8 November 1994
6	"William to the Rescue"	10 November 1994
7	"Sir William"	15 November 1994
8	"Sweet William"	17 November 1994
9	"William and the Whale"	27 December 1994
10	"William and the Alien"	28 December 1994
11	"Wild West William"	29 December 1994
12	"William and the Penguin"	30 December 1994
13	"William and the Wrong Feet"	24 December 1995

=== Series 2 (1996) ===
The first six episodes of the second series were originally broadcast on BBC Two on Fridays at 8:30 am, and later repeated at 2:05 pm on the same day, while the seventh one was broadcast at 7:35 am and repeated at 1:05 pm and the next four were broadcast on BBC One as part of Ants in Your Pants (which was hosted by Children's BBC's then-puppet Otis the Aardvark) on Wednesdays at 3:30 pm; however, the two final episodes of the series were broadcast on Fridays, again as part of Ants in Your Pants, in that same timeslot.

No.	Title	Original release date
14	"Circus William"	19 April 1996
15	"William Hood"	26 April 1996
16	"William and the Pirate's Wreck"	3 May 1996
17	"William of Arabia"	10 May 1996
18	"William and the Genie"	17 May 1996
19	"Jurassic William"	24 May 1996
20	"William and the Sheep"	31 May 1996
21	"Jungle William"	25 September 1996
22	"Sherlock William"	2 October 1996
23	"Ancient William"	30 October 1996
24	"William the Storyteller"	6 November 1996
25	"King William"	6 December 1996
26	"William and the Friendly Ghost"	13 December 1996
