= Kevin Frayer =

Canadian photojournalist (born 1973)

Kevin Frayer (born 1973) is a Canadian photojournalist noted for his wartime work in the Middle East including the Gaza Strip, Lebanon, and Afghanistan. He started his career in 1991 at the Winnipeg Sun and later as a National Photographer for the Canadian Press . From 2003 to 2009 he was based in the Middle East for the Associated Press and later in New Delhi as Chief Photographer for South Asia.

In 2006 and 2009, along with colleagues from the AP he was a finalist for the Pulitzer Prize for images from the war in Lebanon and Afghanistan respectively. His photographs of Palestinian protesters caught in a tear gas assault won a prize from the World Press Photo awards in 2009. He is married to the journalist Janis Mackey Frayer, a foreign correspondent for NBC News.

In 2013, Frayer left AP and joined Getty Images as a contract photographer in Asia. As of 2016 he has been based in China.

== Recognition ==
In April 2015 he won the prestigious Chris Hondros Fund Award. More recently, Frayer won two major awards in the 2016 World Press Photo Contest for photojournalists, including a first prize in the Daily Life category for an image from China and a second place in the Daily Life 'stories' category for a series about the Tibetan Dharma festival. His work has won numerous other awards and citations and has been widely published and exhibited internationally.
