= Janis Mackey Frayer =

Journalist

- Born: Janis Mackey; May 27, 1970; Owen Sound, Ontario; Canada
- Occupation: NBC News journalist
- Spouse: Kevin Frayer
- Children: 1

Janis Mackey Frayer (born May 27, 1970) is a Canadian journalist and a correspondent with NBC News currently based in London.

== Biography ==
Mackey Frayer studied international relations and French at the University of Toronto, and holds a master's degree in International Relations from the University of Cambridge.

Her career began at CFOS Radio in Owen Sound, Ontario, and at age 19 she worked at YTV. She was later a financial news anchor with BNN and wrote a regular business column for The Globe and Mail newspaper.

Mackey Frayer worked in Canada with CTV as its Middle East Bureau Chief in Jerusalem from 2003 to 2009; South Asia Bureau Chief in New Delhi, India from 2009 to 2012; and Asia Bureau Chief from 2013 to 2015.

She has been NBC News' London correspondent since August 2026, after serving as their Beijing correspondent from April 2016 to June 2026.

== Family ==
She is married to photojournalist Kevin Frayer and they have one son.

== Awards and honours ==
Janis Mackey Frayer was awarded the Canadian Screen Award for Best Reportage for her coverage of the 2014 Israel–Gaza conflict, the United Nations/UNDPI Gold Medal at the 2010 New York Festivals and also won World Gold in the category of Human Interest. She then served as a member of the NYF Grand Jury from 2011 to 2014. She has earned two Gemini Award nominations for Best Reportage and two RTNDA Awards for News.
