= Treehouse TV =

Canadian children's television channel

- Logo used since April 7, 2013
- Country: Canada
- Broadcast area: Nationwide
- Headquarters: Toronto, Ontario

Programming
- Languages: English; Audio described
- Picture format: 1080i HDTV (downscaled to letterboxed 480i for the SDTV feed)

Ownership
- Owner: Corus Entertainment
- Parent: YTV Canada, Inc.
- Sister channels: Boomerang; Cartoon Network; Disney Channel; Télétoon; YTV

History
- Launched: November 1, 1997; 28 years ago

Links
- Website: treehousetv.com

Treehouse TV (commonly known as Treehouse) is a Canadian English-language discretionary specialty channel that launched on November 1, 1997, as the first full-day preschool-oriented channel in Canada. It is owned by YTV Canada, Inc., a subsidiary of Corus Entertainment, and was named after sister network YTV's former programming block, "The Treehouse".

When Treehouse TV first launched, it aired daily from 6 a.m. to 3 a.m., before switching to a 24-hour schedule sometime before 2003. In addition to producing its own original series, the channel carries third-party preschool programs from various international markets. Much like YTV, the majority of Treehouse's acquired content came from Nickelodeon (through its Nick Jr. preschool brand) until 2025, when its rights to broadcast Nickelodeon programming expired. It also airs shows from Sesame Workshop and PBS Kids.

As of 2011, Treehouse TV was available to over 7.5 million homes across Canada.

== History ==
=== Treehouse block on YTV (1994–1998) ===
"The Treehouse" originated as a programming block on YTV from 1994 to 1997.

In 1994, YTV introduced a daily programming block for preschool children called "The Treehouse". In lieu of commercials, breaks between programs on the block featured segments hosted by three program jockeys ("PJs") named PJ Katie, PJ Krista, and PJ Todd, who made crafts, played games, and held contests from a tree house-themed set.

The PJs' co-hosts were a group of stuffed animal puppets called the Fuzzpaws. On Fridays, PJ Katie would perform stories with clay animals. These segments were eventually spun off into the series PJ Katie's Farm.

=== As a channel (1997–present) ===
Another previous logo, used until 2013.

In early 1996, it was announced that YTV was looking to move its preschool-oriented programming into a separate network. It was announced in the first half of April 1996, that YTV was developing a spin-off network targeted towards preschoolers named Treehouse TV, and solicited letters supporting the network for the CRTC and Treehouse on-air. The network's president, Patricia Macdonald, said she had "done a lot of research that led us to the conclusion that the kids market is underserved." On September 4, the CRTC approved YTV's request to launch Treehouse TV.

The Treehouse channel launched on November 1, 1997, at 8:00 a.m. EST. For one year, The Treehouse block on YTV continued to air alongside the channel. In 1998, the Treehouse block was replaced by YTV Jr., an unhosted block.

Like the Treehouse block, the Treehouse channel was commercial-free, opting instead to show interstitial shorts in between shows. These shorts featured a new set of characters who lived in Treetown. However, the PJs (program jockeys) from the original Treehouse block did not return for the Treehouse channel, although PJ Katie's Farm reran on Treehouse throughout 1999.

In March 2005, Corus Entertainment began offering a video on demand service called Treehouse On Demand to cable providers such as Rogers Cable and Cogeco, delivering content from Treehouse TV. It is offered as a free service to customers who subscribe to each providers digital cable service. Some providers such as SaskTel offer it as a standalone premium subscription service. Between June 2015 and May 2019, Corus operated TreehouseGO, a TV Everywhere service available on iOS and Android devices.

In 2011, Corus launched a standalone subscription video on demand service for iOS. It was later rebranded to Treehouse Classic until 2016, when a rebrand occurred and the "Classic" branding was removed.

On February 5, 2013, Nelvana, Corus Entertainment's animation division, launched the Treehouse Direct channel on YouTube. On March 2, 2015, Treehouse TV launched its own YouTube channel.

On July 19, 2019, Corus Entertainment filed a copyright infringement lawsuit against an Oklahoma-based medical marijuana dispensary chain, known as "Treehouse Dispensary", alleging the chain "wilfully copied and is using a confusing similar imitation" of the Treehouse TV logo. An attorney for the dispensary contested the claims and said that the business "categorically denies that its logo infringes on any existing trademarks in the United States." Corus won the lawsuit through a default judgment the following December.

On July 4, 2022, the CRTC announced plans to renew the license of Treehouse TV, along with those of Boomerang, Adult Swim, Nickelodeon, Cartoon Network, Télétoon, YTV, Disney Channel, La Chaîne Disney, Disney Junior, and Disney XD, for another two years (licenses not valid as of August 31, 2024).

On September 1, 2025, amid financial pressure at parent company Corus Entertainment, the company's broadcasting rights to Nickelodeon programming on YTV and Treehouse expired and all Nickelodeon programming were removed from both networks, along with YTV's dedicated Nickelodeon channel shutting down the same day. Nickelodeon programming remains available in Canada through the Paramount+ streaming service.

== Programming ==
Treehouse airs a mix of live-action and animated programming targeted at preschoolers and young children, primarily those aged 6 months to 7 years of age. Treehouse airs multiple series produced by sister subsidiary Nelvana alongside programming from third-parties such as Sesame Workshop and Hasbro Entertainment.

== See also ==
- Family Jr. — a former offshoot of Family Channel, that primarily aired programming aimed at preschool children.
- Telebimbi — an Italian-language offshoot of TLN that airs programming aimed at youth raging from preschoolers to pre-adolescents.
- Télémagino — a former French-language offshoot of Family Channel that also aired programming aimed at youth raging from preschoolers to adolescents.
- TeleNiños — a Spanish-language offshoot of TLN that also airs programming aimed at youth ranging from preschoolers to adolescents.
- Yoopa — a defunct French-language children's television channel that primarily aired programming aimed at preschoolers.
- Nick Jr. — a preschool programming block that aired on Nickelodeon.
