= YTV (Canadian TV channel) =

Canadian children's television network

- Logo used since 2014
- Country: Canada
- Broadcast area: National (also available in Jamaica, previously available in the Bahamas until September 2020)
- Headquarters: Toronto, Ontario

Programming
- Language: English
- Picture format: 1080i HDTV (downscaled to letterboxed 480i for the SDTV feed)
- Timeshift service: YTV East; G3

Ownership
- Owner: Rogers Media (1988–1996); CUC Broadcasting (1988–1995); Shaw Communications (1995–1999); Corus Entertainment (1999–present)
- Parent: YTV Canada, Inc.
- Sister channels: Boomerang; Cartoon Network; Disney Channel; Télétoon; Treehouse TV

History
- Launched: September 1, 1988; 38 years ago

Links
- Website: www.ytv.com

Availability

Streaming media
- StackTV: Internet Protocol television

YTV is a Canadian English-language discretionary specialty channel and the flagship property of YTV Canada, Inc., a subsidiary of Corus Entertainment. The channel launched as a joint venture between Rogers Media and CUC Broadcasting on September 1, 1988. Shaw Communications acquired CUC's 34% stake in 1995, followed by Rogers' remaining interest in 1996, before Shaw's media division was separated as Corus Entertainment in 1999. YTV's name was initially thought to be an abbreviation for "Youth Television", though the channel itself has denied this claim as confirmed on their website.

Programming on YTV is targeted at children and young teenagers, and has included live-action and animated series, films, and third-party content from international markets. From the mid-1990s until August/September 2025, YTV acquired programs from the American cable network Nickelodeon.

In 2009, Corus launched a Canadian version of Nickelodeon under licence from Viacom (later ViacomCBS/Paramount Global, now Paramount Skydance), which served as a sister network to YTV until its shutdown on September 1, 2025.

YTV operates two time-shifted feeds, running on both Eastern and Pacific Time Zone schedules. As of 2013, the channel is available in over 11.0 million households in Canada.

== History ==
=== Background ===
Development of the channel began in October 1986 as part of a round of applications for new specialty channels on cable. The application would broadcast an 18-hour schedule, with children's programming during the daytime and family programming at night. During the bidding process, it was set to compete with another applicant, Young Canada Television, which withdrew from the competition in June 1987. YTV would use the evening daypart for "alternative programming", including repeats of classic CBC shows. To cater to a law stipulating 60% of Canadian content, the channel would air reruns of Polka Dot Door, Mr. Dress Up, Cucumber, The Friendly Giant, You Can't Do That on Television, The Littlest Hobo and Lorne Greene's New Wilderness, as well as reruns of American series such as The Munsters, Dennis the Menace, My Three Sons, Lassie, Flipper and The Monkees. The licence was approved by the Canadian Radio-television and Telecommunications Commission (CRTC) on December 1, 1987, by Rogers Cable and CUC Broadcasting. The channel's intended target audience was children whose parents did not allow them to watch television.

=== Early years ===
The channel launched on September 1, 1988, at 7:00 p.m. with the first program being a special celebrating the launch of YTV, hosted by John Candy. At launch, Rogers held 75% of the channel while CUC owned 25%. Its launch was marked by programming issues, as some of the purchased shows did not arrive on time. The schedule was expected to go "on order" on September 18, until then, the network added a scrawl informing viewers of the schedule changes, which were made after they were printed on the press. Kevin Shea was its founding president. At launch, the Canadian offer included shows such as Rainbow Country, Stars On Ice, The Forest Rangers, Smith & Smith and You Can't Do That on Television, reruns of American series, mostly westerns, such as The Lone Ranger, Roy Rogers and Bonanza, as well as European (mostly British) imports such as Robin of Sherwood and Hayley Mills. Filmation animated series, such as He-Man and the Masters of the Universe and Ghostbusters, were also part of the schedule as they were shows whose popularity persisted over constant reruns particularly with the core demographic. One month into its inception, the channel introduced original productions: music shows YTV Rocks (a one-hour music show featuring studio commentary) and YTV Hits (a weekend music show) and two co-productions: game shows Trivial Pursuit and Wild Guess, and the acquired British series S.W.A.L.K., about a teenage girl's fantasies while trying to struggle with her family life. This was followed in late October by Team Tamers, a wildlife-themed game show, presented by Neil Crone. Most of the original programming was seen during 4pm and 8pm; there were also plans to produce shows for teens.

The channel was originally located at 545 Lake Shore Boulevard West, but by November 28, 1990, YTV moved to the renovated 64 Jefferson Avenue.

In December, CRTC refused YTV to change its licence and increase advertising sales. The licence also suggested that the evening drama programming would feature "a major protagonist that is a child, youth under the age of 18 years, puppet, animated character or creature of the animal kingdom", as well as rejecting shows whose main characters were comic book superheroes or mythological heroes. YTV criticized the latter and aimed at obtaining an advertising limit of twelve minutes per hour. YTV started airing Santa Calls, a live, half-hour Christmas call-in special, on December 19, airing nightly at 7pm until December 23.

In January 1989, YTV announced it would boost its production budget, with the primary goal of developing new shows. One of the ideas was a teen drama series akin to Degrassi to cater to the 12–15 demographic. YCDTOTV had become one of its most popular shows within weeks of launch. Beginning February that year, in line with its tenth anniversary, the show had aired two times a day. Bonanza moved to midnights in mid-February, due to the CRTC's recommendations per the age of actor Michael Landon, who grew throughout the course of the series. YTV aired the series because he played Little Joe, who in early seasons was an adolescent. In June, it planned the creation of the Youth Achievement Awards; its first edition was scheduled for November. On July 3, it started airing Picture Pages, a series created by Bill Cosby.

A full year after launching, it had become the most watched specialty channel in Canada, available in 5.3 million households, almost the entirety of the amount of cable-connected households in the country. New for the 1989–1990 season was a variety show, Rec Room, as well as a co-production agreement with Thames Television to produce Spats!, set in a fictional Canadian fast-food chain. Other new shows included a five-year output agreement with the BBC, chief among the shows was Doctor Who, starting with available reruns of early episodes, as well as The New Leave It to Beaver. The Youth Achievement Awards were scheduled for November 3. On January 29, 1990, the channel was carrying Rocky and Bullwinkle in its schedule.

By March 1990, its staff had risen to 140 (up from the original 30) and its revenue base had risen to CA$20 million. Officials said that they could initially reach the figure in 1995. What started as a channel that was unable to compete with American prime time, Family Channel, the video market and CRTC demands had become one of the most profitable on Canadian cable. Teenage Mutant Ninja Turtles had become its most popular show, with its merchandise including in Canada. It had also produced a topical program for adults, Positive Parenting, with Debbie Van Kiekebelt. There were also plans to become the new carrier of the CBC series Switchback, which YTV would finance and would also air on four CBC stations too. The network carried Cartoon All-Stars to the Rescue on April 21, alongside over-the-air networks, as part of a simultaneous showing with the United States and Mexico.

For its 1990–1991 season, the channel would begin using its signature program jockeys on September 3; there was also the Canadian-French co-production The Adventures of the Black Stallion and Maniac Mansion; as well as three original productions for teens: Rock 'n' Talk (beginning September 3), R.O.S. (Ross Oliver Show, from September 9) and StreetNOISE (September 21). The network had surpassed Cancon limits by December 1991, in terms of hours produced and revenue. Revenues for that year were expected to fall in the CA$28–29 million region, up from CA$27 million in 1990. Negotiations were underway with CTV to produce a newscast for the channel in January 1992.

Unusual for such a channel, it announced a pre-emption of its regular programming on March 10, 1992, to carry the CRTC hearings live, with opening remarks from PJ Jazzy Jan, who would explain some of the topics before starting the telecast (9am to 7pm). The press criticized its reliance on American "junk shows", which became more popular than the original productions and special events. In the hearings, YTV executives wanted the channel to start airing productions featuring superheroes, which were excluded per the original licence contract. This concerned Wayne Gretzky, who thought that the network could end up airing violent programming (along the lines of Terminator). It also planned to increase the age limit for primetime protagonists from 18 to 21. In August, YTV obtained a rate increase from 32 to 35 cents a month in Anglophone markets and from 8 to 9 cents a month in Francophone markets. At the same time, its licence was renewed for another seven years. A pilot edition of YTV News aired on October 20, ahead of the launch of the full service early next year. This consisted of a one-hour special, Referendum 102692, concerning the then-upcoming referendum of the Charlottetown Accord. Negotiations with Turner Broadcasting System's Cartoon Network started in early November, it began Canadian distribution for the American channel by late 1993. YTV's president said that, with the arrival of American cable networks to Canada, Canadian producers could benefit from the move. The move implied the creation of a second channel, keeping YTV as it was for its existing output. The first edition of YTV News aired on February 28, 1993, at 12pm. In September 1993, it carried MTV's The Real World. Kevin Shea resigned as president on November 17; he was appointed president and CEO of Atlantis Films next January. By December, the channel had added Mighty Morphin Power Rangers to its schedule. The plan to launch a Canadian version of Cartoon Network was later replaced by Fun TV, of which YTV was one of its shareholders (the channel would eventually become Teletoon later on and would launch in 1997).

=== Atlantis joins YTV ===
In 1994, the stakes of YTV's ownership was changed, with CUC now owning 34% and Rogers now owning 66%. However, in 1994, Rogers announced its plans to sell YTV and the Canadian Home Shopping Channel to another group. In May, Atlantis Communications emerged with a sale proposal, which would result in an acquisition of a 30% stake if the sale was approved. It acquired 40% of the shares in June at the price of CA$18 million, up from the previous month's proposal worth CA$11 million. The acquisition was approved in July.

During the brief period with Atlantis, the channel started its relation with Nickelodeon, beginning to air animated series from the American network, such as Rocko's Modern Life and Rugrats. In addition to the Nickelodeon cartoons, the channel premiered ReBoot. On November 1, 1994, YTV voluntarily removed Power Rangers from its schedule while reviewing its content. The show also aired on Global, where there were talks of its removal. The removal from the cable network was revealed to be "temporary".

=== Shaw's acquisition ===
Calgary-based Shaw Communications was in talks of acquiring CUC's stake of 34% ownership of YTV. The sale was approved in February 1995. That winter, the network started airing Short Circuits, a series of CGI-animated fillers to use during its regulated commercial breaks. Patricia McDonald became YTV's new president on July 17, replacing Terry Coles. On September 20, Rogers announced a CA$113 million acquisition of Shaw's cable head-ends in British Columbia. In exchange, Shaw got YTV and New Country Network, as well as CTV affiliate CFCN.

By June 1996, Shaw had taken full control of YTV. In order to stand out from an increased number of competitors, YTV began to reposition itself as a tween channel. For its 1998 revamp, the network launched 57 new programs as well as "a number of new products such as board games, software, and toys based on the YTV characters", coinciding with its tenth anniversary.

On April 22, 1999, YTV cancelled a scheduled airing of the Buffy the Vampire Slayer episode "Earshot", due to its plotline and subject matter coinciding with the recent Columbine High School massacre. YTV would eventually air the episode on September 25th of that year.

=== YTV under Corus ===
Later in 1999, the media assets of Shaw were separated to form Corus Entertainment.

YTV had new challenges with its licence revision in 2006. Its target audience had started fleeing to other platforms, especially on-demand services, and the channel was also planning to change some of its requirements, such as the removal of pre-school programming, the removal of the protagonist rule it had since its founding, the maximum hours of Canadian dramas per week and the minimum percentage of non-Canadian programming from outside North America. This led to plans to de-regulate the licence in 2007.

Two Corus specialty channel applications for YTV extensions, YTV POW!, an internationally sourced children's action, adventure and superhero genre, and YTV OneWorld, targeting viewers from age 9 to 17 with travel, humour, games and S.T.E.M. were approved on September 18, 2008. The YTV Oneworld licence was used to launch Nickelodeon Canada.

On January 11, 2011, a high-definition feed was launched.

On November 4, 2021, YTV, alongside sister company Nelvana (which Corus acquired in 2000), announced a collaboration with Canadian clothing brand Retrokid to launch an exclusive line of T-shirts and hoodies donning hand-drawn designs of previous YTV logos and insignia, alongside past YTV original programs.

On September 1, 2025, following the closure of the Canadian Nickelodeon network, Corus Entertainment's broadcasting rights to Nickelodeon programming on YTV and preschool-aimed Treehouse expired as a result of Corus' continued financial issues. Nickelodeon programming remains available in Canada through the Paramount+, Netflix streaming services as well as on Crave.

== Programming ==
Current YTV original programming include formerly hosted programming blocks, such as The Zone. In addition to original programming, YTV had historically acquired and co-produced programming with the American cable network Nickelodeon until August 2025. The channel had also aired selected Warner Bros. Animation and Cartoon Network programs that were not carried nor would eventually air on the now-defunct, sister channel Teletoon (which has typically been the main Canadian carrier of Cartoon Network programming).

=== Programming blocks ===
==== Current ====
- The Zone (September 2, 1991–present)
- The Zone Weekend
- Big Fun Movies (January 2, 2011–present)

==== Seasonal ====
- Mucho Marcho – This block airs films every March.
- Fang-Tastic – This block airs Halloween specials and films every October.
- Merry Everything – This block airs holiday specials and films all December long. It was previously known as "Big Fun Holidays" from 2009 until 2011, and "Merry 6mas" from 2012 until 2016.

==== Former ====
- The Treehouse (1994–1998)
- YTV Jr. (September 7, 1998 – 2002)
- YTV PlayTime (2010–2012)
- Bionix (September 10, 2004 – February 7, 2010)
- CRUNCH (September 9, 2006 – September 28, 2013)
- Get Real! (September 8, 2007 – 2008)
- Big Fun Weeknights
- Big Fun Fridays
- 3 Hairy Thumbs Up (October 19, 2002 – August 31, 2008)
- Moovibot (September 5, 2008 – September 6, 2009)
- ZAPX Movies (September 11, 2005 – November 7, 2010)
- Vortex (September 15, 2001 – June 24, 2006), hosted by Stephanie Broschart (2001–2003) and Paula Lemyre (2003–2006)
- Brainwash
- Snit Station
- Limbo (2000–2001)
- Toon Town Alley
- The Alley
- The Breakfast Zone (1995–1996)
- B-Zone
- The Vault (1997)
- YTV Shift
- Spine Chilling Saturday Nights (1999)
- The Dark Corner
- Whiplash Wednesdays
- Nickelodeon Sundays
- Famalama DingDong
- Fam Fun

=== Branding history ===
Initially, YTV utilized computer-generated graphics in their network IDs, which were normally set against different sky backgrounds that changed depending on the time of day. The channel also started using various slogans ("The Spirit of Youth", "Young as You Are!", "The Youth Channel" and "Canada's Youth Channel") to promote and reflect their youth demographic at the time.

Over the years, the channel continued to revise their branding and promotional material. The visual identity of many variants began in August 1993 and is best described as the bridge between the 1991 and 1994 logos. It introduced many of the backgrounds that would be popularized with the 1994 logo and features the logo's text placed atop of random objects. One logo variant used on production credits features an arrangement of the logo's text placed on a red screen of a stylized purple TV set. In 1994, the YTV text was changed, arranged the same way as before, though with an altered design of the TV background and logotype.

In 1998, YTV started to use a Nickelodeon-style "gross-out" factor in its branding and adopted a new slogan, "Keep It Weird". The logo was changed again in September 2000, with the TV background removed and the YTV text modified. The channel continued utilizing various on-air logos featuring the same arrangement of the logo's text, this time on various bizarre and imaginative creatures. Many of the channel's promos from this period often focused on promoting the brand through crude humour, often at the expense of the programs being advertised. As this advertising style permeated the station at all hours of the day, it was heavily criticized, especially by older fans of the station.

As a response, a new "after 6:00 p.m." advertising style was developed for older audiences, which used a much simpler logo (similar to the current logo used today) and sleeker packaging with reduced "gross-out" tactics. Introduced on September 5, 2005, the simple logo (designed by Troika Design Group) first appeared on YTV's promos and even appeared on credits of newer original programming before being later adopted for the entire channel in September 2006, replacing the creatures that had been used in rotation during the channel's daytime hours.

On August 31, 2009, the logo was changed slightly to have featured new colours, and the background was simplified. The bumpers were reduced and were later replaced by opaque digital on-screen graphics telling viewers which programs are coming next, and promotions of the programs. As part of a slightly updated look in September 2012, the colour variants were removed, leaving only the blue variation.

On October 6, 2014, the channel underwent a rebrand, with new graphics and bumpers created by the Toronto-based Eloisa Iturbe Studio. In addition, the channel updated its logo by having it face upwards to the left instead of directly to the audience.

=== Program jockeys ===
Beginning in September 1990, YTV referred their program jockeys as "PJs" in the same vein as disc jockey (DJ) or video jockey (VJ). These were created in May of that year to circumvent advertising limitations during preschool programming; at the time, it went from 9am to 4pm and were seen as a more viable alternative to filler material. Eventually, hosts of these segments would not refer themselves by the moniker by the mid-1990s. A first in North American television, they became a hit within a few months. On April 29, 2023, Corus fired all of the remaining program jockeys due to cuts from Corus CEO Doug Murphy. However, the last three hosts (Spencer, Kelsey, and Melony) still make appearances on social media.

==== Former program jockeys/hosts ====
- Meisha Watson
- Carlos Bustamante
- Lisa Gilroy
- Victor Verbitsky
- Stephanie "Sugar Lyn" Beard
- Elizabeth Becker
- Jenn Beech, also known as "PJ Jenn"
- Stéphanie Broschart
- Andrew Chapman
- Rachael Crawford
- Laura DaSilva
- Emily Agard
- Ali J. Eisner, also known as "Carrie Funkwash"
- Janis Mackey Frayer, also known as "PJ Jazzy Jan"
- The Grogs, puppeteers Jamie Shannon and Jason Hopley
- Phil Guerrero, also known as "PJ Fresh Phil"
- Laurie Gelman (née Hibberd)
- Daryn Jones
- Pat Kelly, also known as "Random Pat"
- Krista Jackson, also known as "PJ Krista"
- "PJ Simon"
- Paul McGuire
- Simon Mohos
- Ajay Fry
- Paula Lemyre
- Shaun Majumder, also known as "Ed Brainbin"
- Aashna Patel, also known as "PJ Aashna"
- Joyce Quansah
- Jennifer Katie Racicot, also known as "PJ Katie"
- Michael Quast, also known as "Michael Q"
- Anand Rajaram, the voice of Snit on Snit Station
- Atul N. Rao, Snit's voice & puppeteer on The Zone
- Rob Stefaniuk, also known as "PJ Rob"
- Chandra Galasso, also known as "PJ Rockin Chan"
- Marty Stelnick, puppeteer
- Phil McCordic, also known as "PJ Taylor"
- Gordon Michael Woolvett, also known as "Gord the PJ Man"
- Russell Zeid
- Honey Khan
- Cory Atkins
- Exan AuYoung
- Mark McAllister
- Wilf Dinnick
- "Tarzan" Dan Freeman
- Shauna MacDonald
- Adrian Pryce
- Spencer Litzinger
- Melony Manikavasagar
- Kelsey Liem
- Mark "Suki" Sukanan

== Related services ==
=== Treehouse TV ===
Treehouse TV (or simply Treehouse) is a Category A cable and satellite specialty channel which airs programming mainly aimed to preschoolers ages six and younger. It launched on November 1, 1997. The channel's name is taken from YTV's now-defunct children's programming block, The Treehouse. Treehouse is carried nationwide throughout Canada and it broadcasts its programming without commercial interruption.

=== Former ===
==== Vortex on Demand ====
In July 2005, Corus Entertainment entered a partnership with Comcast Corporation to launch a cable video-on-demand service called "Vortex on Demand" in the U.S. The deal consisted of 393 30-minute animated series from the Nelvana library; it aired programs such as Cadillacs & Dinosaurs and Medabots. The service was discontinued in mid-2007.

==== Bionix On Demand ====
In 2008, Corus Entertainment started offering a video-on-demand service called "Bionix On Demand" to Canadian cable providers. Rogers Cable and Shaw Cable were the only providers to offer the service. The service offered older and newer anime programs that did not air on YTV itself. The video-on-demand service was previously titled "YTV Anime On Demand". Bionix On Demand was discontinued on December 17, 2009, and was replaced by YTV On Demand.

==== YTV GO ====
YTV GO was a TV Everywhere mobile app available on the App Store and Google Play Store. It was available at no extra charge to all subscribed customers of Access Communications, Bell Satellite TV, Cogeco, Shaw Cable, Shaw Direct, Telus, and VMedia. It offered episodes of various programming from YTV. The app operated between September 2015 and May 1, 2019.

==== Nickelodeon ====
Nickelodeon was a Category B cable and satellite specialty channel that was launched on November 2, 2009, and was based on the American cable channel Nickelodeon. Like its counterparts in America and elsewhere, Nickelodeon aired programs, including both live action series and animation, aimed at children to younger teenagers, specifically targeted to ages 7–11.

The channel closed on September 1, 2025, following continued financial pressure occurring at Corus Entertainment.

=== Related businesses ===
- Whoa! Magazine, YTV's official magazine, began publication in 1999 by Creative House, a joint venture between the channel, Today's Parent Group and Paton Publishing. It was distributed through Pizza Hut, YTV events, Chapters and Indigo bookstores, Canadian newsstands, and subscriptions. Three issues were released in its first year, followed by three in 2000 before the magazine officially became a quarterly (spring, summer, fall, and winter) in 2001. The magazine celebrated its 5th anniversary with a spring collector's issue in 2004. In 2007, the magazine became available as an e-zine on YTV.com. Building on that, in 2008, two additional issues (six for the year) were published as online exclusives. In 2009, YTV ended its association with the magazine, and started publication of a spin-off magazine called YTV Spills. Patton relaunched Whoa! as an independent magazine/blogging platform that same year, until being discontinued in 2011, and shutting the site down in 2012.
- Big Fun Party Mix was a series of compilation cassettes/CDs containing songs from various youth-approved artists both Canadian and foreign, as well as tracks featured in YTV's Hit List and The Next Star, and performances by the station's band "Nuclear Donkey". Universal Music Canada published 11 entries from 2000 until 2009.
- Yabber.net was a moderated online chat room operated from 2001 to 2004. The site hosted live chats between viewers and celebrities, voice actors, YTV hosts, and staff. Upon its closure, YTV.com absorbed some of its functionality.
- The Big Rip was an online portal for browser-based massively multiplayer online games aimed at preteens. Developed by Corus Entertainment and Frima Studio, it launched February 15, 2007. Frima later assumed complete control of the portal before updates were discontinued in 2010, and later shutting down the site.
- YTV Spills was a spin-off quarterly magazine to Whoa! produced in association with The Magazine between 2010 and 2012.

Keep It Weird logo

- Keep It Weird is a YouTube channel featuring various productions by Nelvana, another division of Corus Entertainment, along with former Nickelodeon series, channel promos, and YTV originals. It launched in 2015 under the name Nelvana Retro and was later rebranded to YTV Direct in 2016 before assuming its current name in 2018.

== International distribution ==
- Jamaica – distributed on Flow Cable systems.
- Bahamas – formerly distributed on Cable Bahamas systems channel 307. Removed from the channel line up as of September 2020, due to the programming lineup changes.
