= Lists of Canadian television episodes =

This is a list of lists of Canadian television episodes.

== Children ==
- List of Are You Afraid of the Dark? episodes
- List of Backstage episodes
- List of Degrassi Junior High episodes
- List of Dino Dan episodes
- List of The Elephant Show episodes
- List of The Famous Jett Jackson episodes
- List of Fraggle Rock episodes
- List of Goosebumps episodes
- List of Life with Boys episodes
- List of Life with Derek episodes
- List of Make It Pop episodes
- List of Mickey's Farm episodes
- List of Mr. Young episodes
- List of My Babysitter's a Vampire episodes
- List of Naturally, Sadie episodes
- List of The Next Step episodes
- List of Odd Squad episodes
- List of Popular Mechanics for Kids episodes
- List of Radio Free Roscoe episodes
- List of Romeo! episodes
- List of So Weird episodes
- List of Theodore Tugboat episodes
- List of The Troop episodes
- List of You Can't Do That on Television episodes

== Children's animation ==
- List of 6teen episodes
- List of Abby Hatcher episodes
- List of The Amazing Spiez! episodes
- List of Angela Anaconda episodes
- List of Animal Mechanicals episodes
- List of Annedroids episodes
- List of Arthur episodes
- List of Atomic Betty episodes
- List of Babar and the Adventures of Badou episodes
- List of Babar episodes
- List of The Backyardigans episodes
- List of Beast Wars episodes
- List of Beat Bugs episodes
- List of Beetlejuice episodes
- List of The Bellflower Bunnies episodes
- List of The Berenstain Bears (2002 TV series) episodes
- List of Blaze and the Monster Machines episodes
- List of Bobby's World episodes
- List of Braceface episodes
- List of Bubble Guppies episodes
- List of Caillou episodes
- List of Camp Lakebottom episodes
- List of Care Bears episodes
- List of The Cat in the Hat Knows a Lot About That! episodes
- List of Chaotic episodes
- List of Class of the Titans episodes
- List of Cloudy with a Chance of Meatballs episodes
- List of Cocomelon Lane episodes
- List of Conan the Adventurer episodes
- List of Counterfeit Cat episodes
- List of The Country Mouse and the City Mouse Adventures episodes
- List of The Cuphead Show! episodes
- List of Cyberchase episodes
- List of Daniel Tiger's Neighborhood episodes
- List of Descendants: Wicked World episodes
- List of Detentionaire episodes
- List of Di-Gata Defenders episodes
- List of Dino Ranch episodes
- List of Dinosaur Train episodes
- List of Doki episodes
- List of Donkey Kong Country episodes
- List of The Dragon Prince episodes
- List of Dragon Tales episodes
- List of Ed, Edd n Eddy episodes
- List of Eek! The Cat episodes
- List of Elinor Wonders Why episodes
- List of Esme & Roy episodes
- List of Franklin episodes
- List of Gargoyles episodes
- List of George of the Jungle (2007 TV series) episodes
- List of Gigantosaurus episodes
- List of Handy Manny episodes
- List of He-Man and the Masters of the Universe (2002 TV series) episodes
- List of Hotel Transylvania: The Series episodes
- List of Inspector Gadget (2015 TV series) episodes
- List of Inspector Gadget (1983 TV series) episodes
- List of Iron Man: Armored Adventures episodes
- List of Jacob Two-Two (TV series) episodes
- List of Johnny Test episodes
- List of Justin Time episodes
- List of Kate & Mim-Mim episodes
- List of Katie and Orbie episodes
- List of Kid vs. Kat episodes
- List of Kuu Kuu Harajuku episodes
- List of League of Super Evil episodes
- List of Little Bear episodes
- List of Little Charmers episodes
- List of The Little Lulu Show episodes
- List of Littlest Pet Shop episodes
- List of Maggie and the Ferocious Beast episodes
- List of The Magic School Bus episodes
- List of Mario television episodes
- List of Martha Speaks episodes
- List of Martin Mystery episodes
- List of Max & Ruby episodes
- List of Max Steel (2000 TV series) episodes
- List of Max Steel (2013 TV series) episodes
- List of Miss Spider's Sunny Patch Friends episodes
- List of Monster Buster Club episodes
- List of My Little Pony: Friendship Is Magic episodes
- List of Mysticons episodes
- List of Nature Cat episodes
- List of Ned's Newt episodes
- List of Nexo Knights episodes
- List of Ninjago episodes
- List of Oggy and the Cockroaches episodes
- List of Pac-Man and the Ghostly Adventures episodes
- List of Paw Patrol episodes
- List of Pinky Dinky Doo episodes
- List of PJ Masks episodes
- List of Polly Pocket episodes
- List of Pound Puppies (2010 TV series) episodes
- List of The Raccoons episodes
- List of ReBoot episodes
- List of Redwall episodes
- List of Rocket Monkeys episodes
- List of Rolie Polie Olie episodes
- List of Rupert episodes
- List of Rusty Rivets episodes
- List of Scaredy Squirrel episodes
- List of Shimmer and Shine episodes
- List of Sidekick episodes
- List of Skatoony episodes
- List of Slugterra episodes
- List of The Snoopy Show episodes
- List of Spider Riders episodes
- List of Spider-Man (1967 TV series) episodes
- List of Stickin' Around episodes
- List of Stoked episodes
- List of Storm Hawks episodes
- List of Sunny Day episodes
- List of Super Why! episodes
- List of Team Galaxy episodes
- List of Top Wing episodes
- List of Total Drama episodes
- List of Total DramaRama episodes
- List of Totally Spies! episodes
- List of Transformers: Rescue Bots episodes
- List of Viva Piñata episodes
- List of Welcome to the Wayne episodes
- List of What's with Andy? episodes
- List of Wild Kratts episodes
- List of X-Men: The Animated Series episodes
- List of Xavier Riddle and the Secret Museum episodes
- List of Yo Gabba Gabba! episodes

== Comedy ==
- List of Annedroids episodes
- List of Bizarre episodes
- List of Connor Undercover episodes
- List of Ed, Edd n Eddy episodes
- List of Happy Tree Friends episodes
- List of History Bites episodes
- List of Kenny vs. Spenny episodes
- List of Kevin Spencer episodes
- List of The Kids in the Hall episodes
- List of Letterkenny episodes
- List of Make It Pop episodes
- List of Odd Job Jack episodes
- List of Pure Pwnage episodes
- List of SCTV episodes
- List of Some Assembly Required (2014 TV series) episodes
- List of Super Dave episodes
- List of Trailer Park Boys episodes
- List of The Troop episodes
- List of Y B Normal? episodes
- List of Yo Gabba Gabba! episodes

=== Comedy drama ===
- List of Being Erica episodes
- List of Being Human (North American TV series) episodes
- List of Due South episodes
- List of Final Space episodes
- List of jPod episodes
- List of Less Than Kind episodes
- List of Lexx episodes
- List of My Babysitter's a Vampire episodes
- List of Queer as Folk episodes
- List of Republic of Doyle episodes

== Drama ==
- List of Arctic Air episodes
- List of Backstage episodes
- List of Beastmaster episodes
- List of Bitten episodes
- List of Blue Murder episodes
- List of The Border episodes
- List of Cedar Cove episodes
- List of Chesapeake Shores episodes
- List of Cold Squad episodes
- List of Continuum episodes
- List of Counterstrike (1990 TV series) episodes
- List of Da Vinci's Inquest episodes
- List of Danger Bay episodes
- List of Degrassi Junior High episodes
- List of Degrassi: Next Class episodes
- List of Degrassi: The Next Generation episodes
- List of Edgemont episodes
- List of La Femme Nikita episodes
- List of First Wave episodes
- List of Flashpoint episodes
- List of Forever Knight episodes
- List of Friday the 13th: The Series episodes
- List of Heartland episodes
- List of Instant Star episodes
- List of Kung Fu: The Legend Continues episodes
- List of The Listener episodes
- List of The Littlest Hobo episodes
- List of Lost Girl episodes
- List of Motive episodes
- List of Murdoch Mysteries episodes
- List of The Next Step episodes
- List of Orphan Black episodes
- List of Out with Dad episodes
- List of Paradise Falls episodes
- List of Poltergeist: The Legacy episodes
- List of Radio Free Roscoe episodes
- List of ReGenesis episodes
- List of Reign episodes
- List of Relic Hunter episodes
- List of renegadepress.com episodes
- List of Road to Avonlea episodes
- List of Rogue (TV series) episodes
- List of Rookie Blue episodes
- List of Saving Hope episodes
- List of Traders episodes
- List of Transporter: The Series episodes
- List of The Tudors episodes
- List of Vikings episodes
- List of When Calls the Heart episodes
- List of Wynonna Earp episodes

== Non-fiction ==
- List of 16×9 episodes
- List of Anna & Kristina's Grocery Bag episodes
- List of Audubon Wildlife Theatre episodes
- List of Bake with Anna Olson episodes
- List of Canada's Drag Race episodes
- List of Canada's Worst Handyman episodes
- List of Canadian Pickers episodes
- List of Chopped Canada episodes
- List of Departures episodes
- List of Highway Thru Hell episodes
- List of How It's Made episodes
- List of Ice Pilots NWT episodes
- List of Land and Sea episodes
- List of Lorne Greene's New Wilderness episodes
- List of Mantracker episodes
- List of MasterChef Canada episodes
- List of Mayday episodes
- List of Mystery Hunters episodes
- List of The Nature of Things episodes
- List of Prisoners of Gravity episodes
- List of The Real Housewives of Vancouver episodes
- List of A Scattering of Seeds episodes
- List of Storage Wars Canada episodes
- List of Survivorman episodes
- List of Top Chef Canada episodes

== Science fiction ==
- List of Beyond Reality episodes
- List of Charlie Jade episodes
- List of Continuum episodes
- List of Dark Matter episodes
- List of Earth: Final Conflict episodes
- List of Final Space episodes
- List of First Wave episodes
- List of Forever Knight episodes
- List of Jeremiah episodes
- List of Johnny Test episodes
- List of Killjoys episodes
- List of Lexx episodes
- List of Mutant X episodes
- List of My Secret Identity episodes
- List of Orphan Black episodes
- List of Psi Factor: Chronicles of the Paranormal episodes
- List of Sanctuary episodes
- List of The Sentinel episodes
- List of So Weird episodes
- List of Stargate Atlantis episodes
- List of Stargate SG-1 episodes
- List of Stargate Universe episodes
- List of TekWar episodes
- List of Wynonna Earp episodes

== Sitcoms ==
- List of 100 Deeds for Eddie McDowd episodes
- List of Corner Gas episodes
- List of Kim's Convenience episodes
- List of The Latest Buzz episodes
- List of Life with Derek episodes
- List of Life with Boys episodes
- List of Little Mosque on the Prairie episodes
- List of Made in Canada episodes
- List of Mr. Young episodes
- List of My Secret Identity episodes
- List of Naturally, Sadie episodes
- List of The Red Green Show episodes
- List of Romeo! episodes
- List of Schitt's Creek episodes
- List of Show Me Yours episodes
- List of The Smart Woman Survival Guide episodes
- List of Ugly Americans episodes
- List of Workin' Moms episodes

== Other ==
- List of Bravest Warriors episodes
- List of Chilly Beach episodes
- List of Final Space episodes
- List of Good Witch episodes
- List of Ugly Americans episodes
