= Daddy Dearest =

Daddy Dearest may refer to:

== Television ==
- Daddy Dearest (American TV series), a 1993 American television situation comedy
- Daddy Dearest (2016 TV series), a Hong Kong comedy television drama

=== TV episodes ===
- "Daddy's Dearest", an episode of Dallas
- Daddy Dearest (Phil of the Future episode)
- "Daddy Dearest", an episode of Obra
- "Daddy Dearest", an episode of Cold Case Files
- "Daddy Dearest and the Dueling Divas", an episode of The Real World: Brooklyn
- "Daddy Dearest", an episode of Zevo-3
- "Daddy Dearest", an episode of Jack of All Trades (TV series)
- "Daddy Dearest", an episode of Radio Free Roscoe
- "Daddy Dearest (Sonny Boy)", an episode of Queer as Folk
- "Daddy Dearest", an episode of What's with Andy?
- "Daddy Dearest", an According to Jim
- "Daddy Dearest", an episode of Martin
- "Daddy Dearest", an episode of Drew Carey Show
- "Daddy Dearest", an episode of Dinosaur King

== Other uses ==
- Daddy Dearest, a song by Mr. Lif from I Phantom
- Daddy Dearest, a song by Dogwood from Through Thick and Thin
- Daddy Dearest, an unpublished issue of the comic Ghost Rider 2099

== See also ==
- Father Dearest (Law & Order: Special Victims Unit), a 2012 episode of Law & Order: Special Victims Unit
- Mommie Dearest, a memoir and exposé by Christina Crawford, the adopted daughter of actress Joan Crawford
