= List of Canada's Worst Handyman episodes =

This is a list of episodes for the first season of the Canadian television series Canada's Worst Handyman, where the worst contestant, as determined by 25 challenges over 12 days, is given the dubious title.

Contestant	Nominator	1	2	3	4	5	6
Barry	Scot	WORST	IN	IN	IN	IN	IN
Darryl	Sara	IMP	IN	IN	IN	IN	IN
Jeannie	Laurence	IN	IN	WORST	IN	IN	IN
Keith	David	IN	WORST	IMP	WORST	IN	CWH
Merle	Shelly	IN	IMP	IN	IN	WORST	IN

CWH – The contestant is Canada's Worst Handyman.
WORST – The contestant is the worst of the episode.
NOM – The nominator of the contestant is the worst of the episode.
IN – The contestant was considered for the worst for this episode.
WORST - The contestant was the worst while their nominator was the most improved.
M/W – The contestant was named both the most improved and the worst for this episode.
IMP – The contestant is the most improved of the episode.
NOM – The nominator of the contestant is the most improved of the episode.
OUT – The contestant and their nominator left the show.

== Format ==
Each of the first five episodes contains four or five individual challenges taken from two days of shooting, where a contestant and their nominator work together to complete a task in a given amount of time. There is also a yardwork challenge in each episode, where the contestants have to work together (but without their nominators) to decorate a shed at the front of the Handyman Rehabilitation Centre. At the end of each episode, one contestant is named the most improved (represented by a toolbelt), which allows them to be in charge of the next yardwork challenge and another is named the worst. For the contestant named the worst, the contestant must hang their head in shame and nail their portrait to the side of the shed. They are then given a private lesson by Andrew relating to the reason why they were named the worst.

== Episode 1: Demolition Day ==
The first episode introduces the contestants as they first enter the Handyman Rehabilitation Centre. After the contestants are greeted by show host Andrew Younghusband, each contestant is given a dilapidated one-bedroom apartment at the Handyman Rehabilitation Centre, where their individual challenges will take place. The rooms are color-coded: Darryl in the purple apartment, Merle in the green apartment, Keith in the blue apartment, Jeannie in the yellow apartment and Barry in the red apartment. Before entering their apartments, the contestants must break down a wall blocking the entrance as symbolism for the beginning of the rehabilitation process. Keith was picked to do the honours due to his lack of experience, but it was ultimately an impatient Merle who knocks this wall down. At the start of the first day, they are introduced to general contractor Greg House and interior designer Robin Lockhart, who will teach the contestants the skills needed to tackle the 25 challenges. Darryl was named the episode's most improved handyman due to his overall attitude and first impressions, while Barry was named the worst because he did not listen to the instructions given by the experts—a fact that Barry in fact admitted to and, in retrospect, was deserving of. His extra lesson: a lesson in listening skills, where Andrew asked Barry to do one instruction until he got it right—cutting a board 21 and 7/8" long.

=== Drywall Patching ===
The contestants must patch a hole in their ceiling.

- Darryl – Darryl is slow to begin (due partially to being late and partially due to his complaints about Jeannie asking too many questions). After making his shim, he tries to hammer in his screws, but is eventually convinced by nominator Sara to use the power drill, only to operate said drill in reverse. He never managed to drill and secure the shim and his attempt to cover the hole with the piece of drywall left his piece far into the hole. His work in taping and plastering was not shown.
- Merle – Merle begins by measuring the hole with his hands, due to an aversion to measuring tape and also decides not to install a shim in his hole, instead choosing to jam his piece into place. He then secures his friction-fit piece with drywall tape, effectively using the mesh tape as a "safety net" of sorts. This "net" promptly falls when plaster (which was mixed too thin) is applied. Eyeing a few stray pieces of duct tape (his favorite tool of sorts), he promptly patches the hole with duct tape and plasters over it, much to the ridicule of Andrew.
- Keith – Keith, determined to do the first task correctly, begins by using the radiator in his room as a sawhorse to cut the wooden shim. However, to make his cut drywall piece fit the hole in the ceiling, he chooses to enlarge the hole instead of cutting his piece further down. He eventually abandons the shims and forces his drywall piece into place, and applies plaster liberally.
- Barry – Barry did not recall the instructions provided by Greg, as, ironically enough for a substitute teacher, he was not listening. He first begins cutting the drywall, which he does by using a connected propane stove as a sawhorse. Then he decides not to install a shim in his hole. To hold up his piece of drywall, Barry decides to use his nominator Scot to prop up his piece while tape and plaster were being administered and, when Greg comes in to check on him, he decides to use the shim to hold his piece up from below.
- Jeannie – Jeannie begins by cutting two shims for extra support, but decides to hammer in her screws. Being unable to secure them, she decides to remove them. She declares herself done after wedging her piece in and applying plaster liberally.

=== Yardwork Challenge: Shingling ===
The contestants must work together to shingle the roof of the shed right outside the Handyman Rehabilitation Centre in 90 minutes. Shingles and roofing nails are provided, and instructions are provided on the shingle packages themselves. For safety reasons, the crew insists that only two persons were to be on the roof at any given time. The roof has already been tar-papered prior to the challenge. The team begins by not nominating someone to be in charge. Merle begins right away on the roof with the nails while Darryl and Barry deliver the shingles to the roof. While Merle and Barry argue on which way the shingles should be facing, Jeannie offers to read the instructions aloud to the rest, but the instructions she reads are for a flat roof and the shed is a peaked roof and the others ignore her. Merle convinces Barry that his way of aligning and nailing the shingles (in blocks rather than in rows) is correct (which it is not), but Barry continues to attach the shingles upside-down. Eventually the upside-down shingles were removed and replaced. Soon, work begins on both sides of the roof—Merle and Jeannie together on one side (with Darryl on the roof), while Barry, Keith and Merle work on the other (with Merle on the roof). On Jeannie's end, the shingles are laid out in courses, but the shingles themselves do not overlap, prompting Merle to make a quick patchwork fix. The effect of the block-by-block shingling on the other side leads to a very bumpy roof, which, as Greg notices, would easily fall apart if a strong enough gust of wind hit the roof. The rule that two people were to be on the roof at any time was quickly broken when Barry decides to go on the roof himself ("we didn't build it so it's gotta be safe" is his rationale), leading to Keith also joining Darryl and Merle on the roof. Keith mainly went up to the roof to tell the others how to shingle a roof with a valley, which the roof of the shed has none, but which Keith insists that it had in its peak. In the end, though, the contestants together manage to completely shingle the roof, albeit poorly with low quality.

=== Toolbox Building ===
Prior to entering the Handyman Rehabilitation Centre, each contestant was asked to build a toolbox based on a very simple diagram, to replace their existing tool storage. Jeannie had used plastic filing cabinets, Merle a cardboard box and Keith a suitcase from an old Fisher-Price record player.

- Darryl – Darryl makes meticulous measurements, but uses hammers to drive in his screws. No other details of construction was given, but his toolbox handle was oriented in a different direction compared to the diagram.
- Merle – Merle begins by cutting ad-hoc without first measuring and uses a circular saw and a chisel to cut the hole for the toolbox handle. He quickly nails the box together and declares himself finished, but the box falls apart when tools were loaded in. His quick fix was to secure the box with more duct tape.
- Keith – Keith was given a jigsaw to cut his wood, having no power tools of his own. He finishes his box without a hole for a handle, but includes a strap for carrying over a shoulder.
- Barry – Barry begins cutting his wood by using his circular saw with its blade having fully rusted over. To cut the hole for the toolbox, though, Barry first drills a small hole but discovers that the jigsaw blade doesn't fit through it. His resulting box is similar to that of the diagram, but is not square in any way.
- Jeannie – Jeannie's box assembly was not shown, but in trying to make a hole for the handle with a jigsaw she does not make a hole, hoping that the jigsaw blade's back-and-forth motion would simply punch a hole through the wood. She manages to finish a box with a hinged opening.

=== Painting ===
The contestants must paint a mural on the living room wall. The contestants may choose seven items of their choosing, but must commit to their choices before his challenge begins. After the painting, their challenges are inspected by Greg and Robin, as well as (for this episode only) psychologist Dr. Julie V. Hill.

- Darryl – Darryl had chosen three colors which Sara disliked, although they spend some time planning on what they would do (in lieu of planning ahead). They eventually settle on four square blocks. Once the paint cans are opened, Sara begins painting. Sara is forced to let Darryl paint the mural alone when Andrew enters to complain.
- Merle – Merle packs supplies, including multiple paintbrushes, but nearly forgets to choose some paint. He did eventually manage to get one can of blue paint and created a mural with a picture of what Sara referred to as a Playboy bunny freehand with a paint roller and using drywall tape in lieu of a sponge for a paint effect. He is finished in less than 15 minutes to mild acclaim.
- Keith – Keith's centerpiece was an "emotion wheel," which Robin greatly disliked. In her words, she would "curl up in the fetal position and give herself a cry" if she saw it in a living room.
- Barry – Barry had chosen a lot of paint (as well as a bottle of wood glue for no apparent reason), but did not choose a paintbrush, thus resorting to finger painting to complete a mural. In an attempt to help Barry, his nominator, Scot, tries to steal a paintbrush from the supply closet, but is caught red-handed. Scot begs to Andrew to allow him to bring back one paintbrush, which falls on deaf ears. Julie believes that Barry is intentionally doing a substandard mural in order to be lazy, raising Robin's concerns, as she believes that he is simply careless.
- Jeannie – Jeannie had the foresight to plan ahead with a nature scene design and thus had the right tools. The colors she chose complimented the yellow base color of her apartment, creating a stunning result.

== Episode 2: Toilet Training ==
This episode focuses on various bathroom-related renovations. Merle was named the most improved handyman of the episode, largely as he was one of the two contestants to have a working toilet, while Keith was named the worst because of his hostile attitude towards the experts, particularly Robin. His extra lesson was one where Andrew convinces him to stop making fun of the experts—Robin in particular, who he called a witch—and voice his concerns with them personally. In the end, Keith decides to apologize.

=== Replacing a Toilet ===
The contestants are tasked with removing the existing toilet and replacing it with a new one.

- Darryl – Darryl starts by flushing the toilet, but without disconnecting the water supply. He does, however, manages to remove the tank and bails the water out of the bowl using a glass. Installation of the new toilet does not prove to be an issue and Darryl earns a passing grade.
- Merle – Merle removes the toilet without draining all the water from it, causing him to spill the remaining water all over the bathroom floor. Merle's installation also goes without any issues, although he did manage to briefly misplace two bolts and washers that were needed to hold the water in place. His work earns him a passing grade.
- Keith – Keith struggles with disconnecting the water and removing the toilet due to forgetting the direction in which bolts are tightened and loosened and when told by his nominator, David, it serves to confuse him further. He does eventually manage to remove and reinstall the toilet, but runs into trouble reconnecting the water lines. In the end, his tank is wobbly and the toilet does not flush properly.
- Barry – Barry struggles with removing the toilet due to a stubborn bolt and is forced to remove the toilet by smashing it. He also attempts to remove the flange, believing that was what he was told. In the end, his toilet flushes properly, but his work still failed because his toilet was not properly bolted down.
- Jeannie – Not much work was shown in Jeannie's washroom, although it was noted later that her toilet leaked because it was installed on a slight angle, which in turn prevented her from completing a later challenge.

=== Vinyl Flooring ===
The contestants are asked to use vinyl flooring to cover their tiled bathroom floor. Keith asks why this was not done before the toilet was replaced, as it is how it is done in new construction, to which Greg replies that the task is there to improve their overall renovating skills.

- Darryl – Andrew offers his assistance due to Sara's back ailment, although Sara is adamant that she help him through the challenge. Darryl, however, fails to see how his vinyl flooring could fit around the toilet, so he opts to install the flooring in pieces, leaving large seams in the floor. He gives up after realizing this mistake.
- Merle – Merle begins on the right foot by creating a paper template, although he soon gives up and resorts to measuring the bathroom with his feet to determine the vinyl he needs. His inaccurate measurements leads to numerous patch jobs. He claims to be done just as his nominator Shelly points out that he had yet to glue his floor down. Merle almost paints himself into a corner by putting his floor pieces in the bathtub before covering his entire bathroom floor in glue.
- Keith – Not much work was shown in Keith's bathroom, although Keith has done more of the steps correctly. However, the end result leaves much to be desired.
- Barry – Barry has done this before, having done it in his own home. He begins by cutting a large piece of flooring and cutting the excess as he goes (or tucking his excess under his loose toilet). Barry claims he is finished, but Scot points out that he had yet to glue his floor down (something he did not do even at home).
- Jeannie – Jeannie begins by cutting a large piece of vinyl flooring in the hope of cutting the excess flooring as she goes, but her first piece is too small. Jeannie also had trouble keeping her floor dry due to the leaking toilet, but resolves to glue the floor down anyway, which would trap a layer of water under the flooring.

=== Yardwork Challenge: Interlocking Brick ===
After Darryl reluctantly invites the others to see his botched vinyl floor, he wants to be left alone, yet he is the foreman of the yardwork challenge, which makes his task all the more difficult. This is compounded by the fact that Barry resolves to be a pain in Darryl's face, while Merle and Jeannie resolve to blindly follow Darryl's decisions. In this challenge, the contestants must lay down a path with interlocking brick. Darryl's plan is to lay a path out from the shed door, with a flower bed and fire pit on the side. Keith gets going on the fire pit, while the rest dig a path for the brick that is mere inches deep. Because of Darryl's dislike of Jeannie, Jeannie is sent to help Keith with the fire pit. Merle is put to laying down the bricks after very little limestone pad is spread out. The bricks are put down in rows and are not interlocked (defeating the purpose of interlocking brick and create lumps in the ground because a level was not used. Worse yet, to create the impression of level dirt is being backfilled to make the bricks level, a fact that Barry points out (by asking him what the level was for) but Darryl quickly dismisses, saying "it's too late for that." Merle eventually finishes the fire pit, which is far too shallow and surrounded by one layer of loose brick and the flower bed is quickly finished. The contestants celebrate with a fire.

=== Tiling a Backsplash ===
The contestants must tile the backsplash above their bathroom sink in 30 minutes. They will then have another 90 minutes to grout and paint their bathrooms, as well as finish any remaining incomplete tasks.

- Darryl – Darryl has had experience in tiling and grouting, having done this as part of his contestant audition. He manages to create the right mix of tiling adhesive, and tiles three courses successfully, although some distance remains between the top course and the mirror cabinet. However, with nothing to cut ceramic tile and recognizing that ceramic tiles do not cut cleanly (a fact he had learned from his earlier experience), he declares himself finished. This earned a passing grade in less than 15 minutes of work and also does the grouting correctly.
- Merle – Instead of tiling adhesive, Merle chooses to use construction adhesive to adhere the tiles to the wall and then putting the tiles on without measuring or leaving any gap for grout. To fill up the partial tile distance, Merle chooses to smash tiles to make them fit. Because there is no room for grout, Merle fails this challenge. When painting the bathroom, Merle resolves to be as neat as possible, taping his edges and wrapping himself in plastic.
- Keith – Keith chooses to be "artistic" in his tiling, and uses excessive buttering to place three tiles on top of each other on the left side, right side and over the middle of the sink, creating a gap of up to six centimetres between his columns. Keith also smashes the tiles to fill the gap between his three "columns," but the smashed tiles cover very little of this gap. Because of this and the fact that his grout had the consistency of soup, Keith fails this challenge.
- Barry – Barry also tiles successfully (albeit using a small putty knife instead of a trowel to apply the adhesive), but smashes the tiles to fill the gap between the mirror cabinet and the top row of full tiles. Due to an acceptable coverage of the area, his work receives a passing grade.
- Jeannie – Jeannie, having not read the instructions on mixing the tiling adhesive, is making a mess while tiling. Jeannie fails the challenge after running out of time. After finishing the tiling in the extra time, she uses a stick instead of a grout float in order to push the grout between the tiles.

== Episode 3: Some Assembly Required ==
This episode focuses on installations in the bedroom. Although everyone made noticeable progress in rehabilitation, Keith was named the most improved handyman of the episode, while Jeannie was named the worst because of her lack of skills and refusal to ask for help. It takes Jeannie 46 tries just to put a single nail to the side of the shed and her extra lesson was more practice in the use of a power drill.

=== Building a Shelf ===
The contestants must build and mount three shelves onto a concrete wall in one hour. Contestants are given pine boards, glue and screws to do this. As a final test, all of the shelves are tested to see if they hold a certain amount of weight.

- Darryl – Darryl is shown meticulously planning the shelves and cutting the pieces of wood to his precise specifications. Despite his meticulous planning, though, he manages to complete only one shelf and it did not even hold its weight.
- Merle – Merle eyeballs the angles he needs, using a mitre box as a sawhorse. His design has the three shelves as a single unit, unlike the others who had three separate shelves. Because of the concrete walls, he is unable to mount his shelf unit to the wall and is forced to mount it in a corner of his room. Although his shelf unit is unlevel (having measured by eye), it does manage to hold the weight of the items placed there.
- Keith – Keith is not confident of his skill in using a power drill, believing that he could hurt himself from screws flying everywhere if he operated the drill too fast. Andrew is forced to show him how to operate the drill at various speeds. Keith is also shown to have attempted to bore a hole while his wood is on the floor, damaging the floor below. At the end of the hour, Keith has two shelves up on the wall, with the third only half up (in his words, he needed an extra few seconds to screw one last screw into the wall to hold the third shelf in place). After being given some extra time to put the last shelf in place, only that last shelf could not hold the weight of the items placed there.
- Barry – Barry used the drill in an unsafe manner by holding the pieces of wood on his leg while screwing into them. Barry manages to finish one small shelf in an hour, which holds its weight.
- Jeannie – In making the shelves, Jeannie used a mitre saw and a coping saw in an attempt to cut thick boards. She also inserts the screw into her power drill chuck instead of a screwdriver bit in an attempt to screw two pieces of wood together. In the end, Jeannie manages to only mount one shelf, which held the weight of the items placed there, despite her feelings that it wouldn't.

=== Laminate Flooring ===
After being given a brief lesson on using a drill by Greg after seeing abysmal drilling techniques in the morning challenge, the contestants are given another lesson on using a jigsaw for their next challenge: to lay down tongue-and-groove laminate flooring in their bedroom... or rather, the contestants will direct their nominators on how to lay down laminate flooring. This is a test of whether contestants can understand the instructions (given with the flooring) and give them out correctly, as well as their planning skills. At the end of the challenge, none of the contestants manage to finish the flooring, even with helping their nominators.

- Darryl – Darryl had trouble understanding the pictorial instructions, which makes Sara lay the flooring down in nonstaggered blocks instead of staggered courses, leaving a large gap between the wood in later courses.
- Merle – Merle is quick to "break the rules" by helping Shelly lay out duct tape to tape the foam underlay together. He also directs Shelly to lay the floor nonstaggered, although he is convinced by Shelly to stagger their joints. Merle also convinces Shelly to use the jigsaw instead of a crosscut saw to cut the boards, which Shelly does not agree to but later acquiesces.
- Keith – Keith directing David had no major issues when the floor was half complete, except that their floorboards were in the wrong direction. Although they do discover this error later on, both he and David agree that it was too late to redo.
- Barry – One of Barry's errors was to cut the boards face-up, which would ruin the appearance of the boards. Not much else was shown on Barry's work.
- Jeannie – In attempting to cut a board, she installs the blade on her jigsaw backwards on one occasion. However, she is the only contestant to install her floorboard in the correct orientation.

=== Yardwork Challenge: Painting the Shed ===
Merle, as the most improved handyman in the previous episode, is tasked to lead the contestants into painting the shed with a design of his own choosing. Although Merle is up to the challenge of leadership, Darryl had plans to sabotage it to knock him down a notch. To do so, he tries to sabotage the work that Merle had allotted to Jeannie (who Darryl greatly dislikes) while Merle himself was addressing the queries by the others. Merle still had other issues to deal with, as both Keith and Darryl refused to work and Merle himself was not painting as he was trying to help Jeannie. When time runs out, Merle admits that the challenge itself was a failure, with many spots left unpainted, but through no fault of his own.

=== Building a Chair ===
Robin teaches the contestants on building a straight-back chair, centering about three points: "Form, Function and Construction."

- Darryl – Darryl is clueless as to how to proceed building given the raw materials. He also uses a mitre saw, a coping saw and a hack saw to cut his thick boards, while the right saw, a crosscut saw, is hanging on the wall behind him. Despite this he manages to finish a small chair that holds Andrew's weight.
- Merle – Merle quickly builds a small table to act as the base of a chair. After bracing his mini-table at Shelly's insistence, Merle decides to use a tape measure instead of body parts for measurement (in this case, Shelly's back), a first for him in the series. Merle finishes a chair with a short back large enough to seat two persons, which manages to hold both his and Andrew's weight.
- Keith – Keith knows exactly the design he wants, a "presbyterian chair" modeled after a church pew. However, his chair, consisting of three boards screwed together with minimal bracing, promptly falls apart. After adding minor reinforcements, his chair is completed.
- Barry – Barry's strategy is to quickly build something that looks like a chair and add strength later. His "do it by feel" design leads to his chairs being crooked. He later admits that no glue was used in the chair's construction, which made Greg react that his chair was better suited for a plant stand. Despite this, Barry's chair does manage to hold Andrew's weight.
- Jeannie – Jeannie uses a folding chair as a prototype for her straight-back chair, which Andrew claims is a mistake, as folding chairs are much more complicated than the chairs they were to build. Jeannie also decides not to ask for her nominator Laurence's help, working alone in silence. She quickly asks for Laurence's help as time runs out, but it takes her an extra 15 minutes to complete her chair... and even then, her chair falls apart from Andrew's weight.

=== Assembling the Bed ===
The contestants were to assemble a pre-fabricated bed and end table combination from IKEA, after which a quick evaluation of each contestant's bedroom was performed.

- Darryl – Darryl decides to work backwards and proceeds to assemble the bed without reading the instructions, while Sara is handling the end table. Darryl manages to build a bed, but only briefly before it falls apart. The couple decides to abandon assembling the bed and work together on the end table, but could not finish it in time.
- Merle – Merle and Shelly decide to work together in assembling both pieces. Although he is forced to use duct tape to repair wood that had been split through hammering parts into place, he manages to finish both pieces in time. He also manages to cut his hand in the process of repairing the wood with duct tape, for which he quickly bandages with more duct tape.
- Keith – Keith starts quickly on the right foot, by checking his parts list and following the instruction. However, frustration kicks in when his partially completed bed falls apart and the continued frustration brings him to the boiling point. In the end, Keith finishes with neither.
- Barry – No footage of Barry was shown, although Barry finished the bed but not the end table.
- Jeannie – Jeannie is once again off to a slow start due to refusing help from Laurence until the last moments. Despite this, she manages to finish the end table.

== Episode 4: Counter Revolution: The Switcheroo ==
This episode focuses on kitchen renovations. For each individual challenge in this episode, contestants were paired with the nominators of other contestants. In an interesting twist, Keith's nominator, David, was named the most improved as he assisted Darryl, Barry and Merle in completing their tasks, while Keith himself was named the worst, largely due to his lack of leadership in the yardwork challenge and the fact that he had completed only one of the 19 challenges so far, building a chair in the previous episode that led to him being named the most improved. His extra work consists of building a smaller-scale fence from popsicle sticks.

=== The Kitchen Sink ===
The contestants must remove the existing sink and countertop and replace them with a new sink and countertop, including disconnecting and reconnecting the plumbing, all within two hours.

- Darryl – Darryl is paired with David, who had been annoyed with his seemingly rude behavior in the previous episodes. However, the two work very well together due to Darryl believing that David is more helpful in the one challenge than Sara in the previous ones. The two together finish every step correctly in 90 minutes with a passing grade and proceed to help the other contestants together in their spare time.
- Merle – Merle's speed annoys Sara as she helps him through the process: after disconnecting the sink, the countertop and the sink were removed together and some of the counter's framing remain attached to the countertop after it was removed, forcing Merle to reassemble the kitchen counter itself before attempting to attach the new countertop. In the plumbing portion, Merle insists on eyeballing the lengths of the pipes needed to connect his sink. Unfortunately for him, his cuts were too short and the crew had intentionally removed every single roll of duct tape, his favorite quick fix-up scheme, from the premises. However, he does manages to find plumber's putty, which he uses to seal the numerous joins in his plumbing. Although Merle's "patch-up" plumbing initially holds water, it is given a failing grade as the putty merely serves to make the water leak slowly over time.
- Keith – Keith, paired with Shelly, begins by smashing his faucets apart using a crowbar. After a while, it became apparent that although working together, Shelly was the one doing most of the gruntwork. Keith, however, is enjoying the experience, especially when handling power tools. However, when time runs out, he hasn't even started on the plumbing.
- Barry – Barry was initially disappointed that Laurence would be assisting him. When disconnecting the sink, Barry opts to smash the sink's tiedowns. After removing and replacing the countertop, Barry elects to cut the hole for the sink freehand instead of using the provided cardboard outline, and it takes him numerous times to get the hole just right. He also attempts to drill the holes for the faucets with the drill in reverse with an incorrectly sized drill bit, with the intention of widening the hole using the jigsaw. Although given suggestions by Keith and Darryl on how to connect the sink, Barry concedes that between him and Laurence, it was "the blind leading the blind." Unsurprisingly, Barry fails this challenge due to his pipes leaking at the trap.
- Jeannie – Although Jeannie has her own ideas, Scot decides to take charge (due to Jeannie's plans, which included removing the countertop with a utility knife, making no sense) and let Jeannie (who is told repeatedly by Scot to "think the next step ahead") find the tools he needs to doing it correctly. This resulted in Scot doing most of the gruntwork, such as using the jigsaw to cut the hole in the new countertop for the new sink, while Jeannie appeared lost. Jeannie and Scot do not finish in time.

=== Vinyl Tiles ===
The contestants have to tile their kitchen floor with stick-on vinyl tiles in a diagonal checkerboard pattern. The main skill is to determine a center point in the room and working their way out. Because of inconsistent joins and rough edgework across the board, all of the contestants fail in this challenge.

- Darryl – Darryl and Shelly get frustrated in the process of finding a center point to begin their tiling, although they do manage to begin. When Sara visits after being bored with Barry, she helps Darryl's edgework by forcing the tiles in place.
- Merle – Merle and Scot begins by simply adhereing the tiles ad-hoc without any measurement and he forces the edge tiles to fit the space needed.
- Keith – Keith, paired with Laurence, simply guesses where the center of his kitchen is instead of using chalk lines. Keith's edgework also ends far away from the actual edge.
- Barry – Sara and Barry go at quite the pace, which bores Sara. Shelly switches with Sara and Barry and Shelly quickly finish up the edgework correctly, using the tile's paper backing to create a template for the partial tiles.
- Jeannie – Jeannie and David proceed well together, but upon doing the edgework, Jeannie is confused by the geometry and repeatedly cuts the tiles so that the portion she needs is upside-down.

=== Wallpapering ===
The contestants have to apply wallpaper to a wall in their apartment. Four of the five contestants will be given regular wallpaper, but the fifth will have custom-made wallpaper with a pattern consisting of Andrew's facial expressions.

- Darryl – Darryl begins by applying adhesive to the wall instead of the wallpaper. Darryl and Scot, though, notice that after two pieces were applied, their wallpaper is upside-down. After getting it right-side up, though, his seams no longer match up, and to match them up would leave the second piece short. Pressed to move forward, Darryl and Scot overlap the next few pieces of wallpaper, something that they were told not to do. Darryl and Scot make the reluctant decision to tear the wallpaper down and start over. Still, he manages to fail to match the pattern up on his third try. Completely frustrated and finding Scot useless, Darryl gives up on the challenge.
- Merle – Merle is convinced by Laurence to begin by applying the adhesive to the wallpaper instead of the wall. The two finish in an hour, although minor seam inconsistency forces Laurence to admit that it was not his best work.
- Keith – Keith and Sara quickly get moving, only to start over when Andrew noticed that he began wallpapering in the middle of the wall and not the corner of the wall, with the wallpaper upside-down. In the end, his wallpaper is crooked, upside-down, overlapping, and incomplete.
- Barry – Barry and David are doing well, which is not a surprise, given that anyone paired with David had been doing well. Barry and Keith (whose wallpaper had no pattern between the seams) finish in 50 minutes.
- Jeannie – Jeannie and Shelly begin the challenge by sanding the wall to which the wallpaper will be applied, which would take quite some time given the concrete walls. When they finally decide to stop, Jeannie discovers that she is given the wallpaper with Andrew's face all over it. Jeannie measures exactly the length she needs, but is unable to match up her seams. Worse yet is that she did her cutting over her newly placed vinyl floor. Jeannie is not finished by the time the other contestants visit her, although she had been doing the wallpapering correctly up to that point.

=== Yardwork Challenge: Fencing ===
Keith leads the team into building a picket fence and planting a small flower bed. He does so by first using interpretive dance, but has no plan of attack. When Jeannie offers her thoughts, Keith sends her to do the most backbreaking task: mixing the concrete for the fenceposts. Keith then gets everyone else to dig holes for the fenceposts at random spots without measurements, and not very deep at that. This stresses the other men, who notice that the fence is not straight and not level. Keith, for his part, does not budge and everyone quickly becomes frustrated by Keith's lack of leadership, believing that it stifles their opportunity to improve. Keith himself is doing none of the hard work himself, despite his drive to learn. While the rest quickly get the idea of how to do it correctly (for example, putting the pickets up from one end to the other), Keith continues to get everyone to do things in his artistic manner incorrectly (his rationale for not putting the pickets up correctly: a "quantum physics" phoenomena where the pickets themselves would "establish their own order" if they were to be placed randomly). Due to the lack of leadership, Barry has taken a seat, while Merle has disappeared, taking a nap in the shed and when Andrew notices this, Merle begs him to mercifully end the challenge.

=== Hanging a Door ===
The contestants are to hang a door that leads into their kitchen. Merle is especially motivated in this challenge, having wanted to hang nine new doors in his house but having never gotten around to it in ten years.

- Darryl – Darryl, despite Laurence's assistance, is baffled by how the door is supposed to be hung: he is confused over the direction in which the door is supposed to swing, which causes him to repeatedly change the direction in which his header and one of the jambs are installed. Once again, Darryl gives up on the challenge out of frustration.
- Merle – Determined to see Merle succeed, David is partnered with him for the challenge. Merle starts off in the right foot, cutting the header and one of the jambs. Unfortunately, he cuts the wrong end of his other jamb so that the strike plate no longer meets the doorknob hole. Merle's solution of hanging the door so that the door swings in the opposite direction does not help. Merle later accepts David's idea of cutting the end of the jamb that he had mistakenly cut by the same amount that he had cut from the other end, and putting the two pieces together to form the new jamb so that the doorknob and strike plate meet. Merle celebrates his mostly correct installation by slamming it shut repeatedly.
- Keith – Keith and Scot are paired together for this challenge. However, Scot quickly gets frustrated when Keith takes four minutes to put his jamb in because it takes Keith upwards of 50 tries to drive a nail into place. Keith's door, when done, does not close all the way.
- Barry – Barry, paired with Shelly, cut his door too short, but manages to hang his door level. However, it doesn't reopen from the outside, locking Greg and Robin out when it comes to their final inspection.
- Jeannie – Jeannie, paired with Sara, cuts the door and doorjamb correctly, but screws the hinges on the wrong side, leading to both believing that the door is being put in upside-down. The resulting door is one that opens but doesn't shut. In the end, Jeannie cuts the door so that it is too narrow for the space provided.

== Episode 5: Six Degrees of Renovation ==
As the second-to-last episode, Merle was named as the worst, despite his significant improvements, for his ignorance of safety after accidentally cutting himself with a utility knife. As he hangs his head in shame, another duct tape joke (which had been persistent throughout the episode) is cracked at his expense, this time by Jeannie. As Merle attaches his picture on the wall of shame, his prompted to add a dab of paint to his picture to denote where he had cut himself. His extra lesson is a long lecture about what is safe and what isn't when it comes to cutting, of all else, duct tape. The episode begins with Merle showing up early and completely disassembling his duct tape-patched drywall from the first episode, due to his inability to sand and apply a second coat of plaster (which was done during the events of an earlier episode). At first, he opted to chisel off the plaster (instead of sanding) and sealing off the second coat with newspaper, but the ceiling had apparently haunted him enough to do the drywall path over again. This time around, Merle does the drywall patching correctly, complete with a shim for support, all without duct tape, which he vowed to avoid for the remainder of the day. As the rest of the contestants file in, they are told to do a final coat of plaster on their drywall patches.

=== Upholstering ===
The first challenge of the episode has the contestants upholstering a chair, either the chair they had built in the third episode or a bar stool provided from the supplies. As an effort to test Merle's will to keep his word and avoid duct tape, Robin (teaching the contestants the skills needed) specifically allows the contestants to use duct tape to upholster their chairs and provides a large number of rolls. Merle quickly caves (while the others, aware that the stipulation was a joke at Merle's expense, refuse) and begins the challenge with the duct tape.

- Darryl – Darryl had minor problems with his stapler. However, when reassembling the stool, some of the screws were still loose.
- Merle – Merle chooses to upholster his chair with duct tape (and is the only contestant to choose to upholster their own chair), believing that it will get his job done faster. He is also the only one to use a utility knife to cut his duct tape, while the rest use scissors to cut their fabric. When Andrew insists that duct tape is not meant for upholstering, Merle does not budge, having completed half his chair with duct tape. However, Merle is forced to stop when he cuts himself using the utility knife, which he had used with the blade pointing towards himself. Despite his insistence that his chair is done and it is just a flesh wound, Merle is taken to St. Michael's Hospital (Toronto) to get five stitches.
- Keith – Keith makes the mistake of doing his work without laying out craft paper (or some other drop cloth) to avoid contact between his new fabric and the dirty floor. His reassembly also had issues.
- Barry – No footage was shown of Barry's work, although it was implied that his reassembly left the bar stool with loose legs.
- Jeannie – Jeannie chooses the bar stool to reupholster, but also chooses to discard the old fabric instead of using it as a template for a new one, opting instead to guess at the fabric's dimensions. The stool was rendered unusable, as the legs could not be reattached.

=== Yardwork Challenge: Arbours ===
In this episode's yardwork challenge, led by Keith's nominator, David, the contestants build an arbour for the shed, as well as assemble a barbecue. David begins the challenge on the right foot, consulting the rest of his team on what an arbour is (explained to him by Jeannie), and how to build it. To dig the holes for the footings, an auger is used, which Barry and Darryl (the prime candidates, according to David) operate. Jeannie is put to mixing concrete, Keith assembling the barbecue, while David himself cuts the cross beams. Things go along swimmingly until Barry and Darryl are both sent flying from operating the auger too fast. Eventually, the holes are dug and everyone (except Keith) work together into installing and levelling the posts and crossbeams. The yardwork challenge (save Keith's barbecue) is a resounding success, although the contestants are somewhat disappointed that Merle (still at hospital) did not participate. The only resounding failure in this project: how bad the other yardwork challenges look in comparison.

=== Stippling ===
The four remaining contestants are tasked to apply stipple onto their ceiling.

- Darryl – Darryl, having made the necessary precautions, is doing the job correctly, until Sara pressures him to do otherwise. Although Andrew is sent in to correct Sara, he is caught up by Merle returning and Sara pressures Darryl into accepting that her way (applying stippling in both directions) is correct.
- Merle – Merle returns in the middle of the challenge and begins his in earnest, although he is reminded by Andrew to put on his "custom-made" dropcloth that he had from an earlier episode. When word gets around to Merle having returned, the other contestants go out of their way to help Merle finish his ceiling.
- Keith – Keith does not cover himself with plastic and rolls the stipple back and forth, resulting in getting stipple all over himself.
- Barry – Barry begins by not covering the room with plastic to avoid getting stipple all over the room and does not follow the instructions that state to roll the stipple in only one direction.
- Jeannie – No footage of Jeannie stippling her ceiling is shown.

=== Ceiling Fan ===
The handymen are to install a ceiling fan in two hours, which disturbs Barry, having been involved in a near-fatal electrical accident back at home while fixing his dryer. The contestants are also told that the circuit breakers controlling the fluorescent tube lighting that they will be replacing with the fan has been turned off, unaware that he had lied. Not one contestant catches this and the challenge begins on a bad note as both Greg and Andrew are forced to lecture the contestants about safety.

- Darryl – In the process of disassembling his fan, Darryl breaks apart his green ground wire, putting him in trouble. Although his lights and fan work, the lack of a ground wire causes him to get a failing grade.
- Merle – Although told to connect wires of the same color, Merle connects the black ones to the white ones, which Shelly catches. Unsure and not trusting his instructions, Merle calls his uncle back home. He eventually gets things right and gets a passing grade after 90 minutes of work.
- Keith – Little footage is shown of Keith's installation, although it works perfectly.
- Barry – Barry tests his wiring by attaching a lightbulb and one of the fan blades, then throwing the breaker back on, which led to Scot promptly telling him to turn it back off. He eventually gets the light and fan working perfectly.
- Jeannie – Jeannie uses duct tape to secure her bracket in place as a temporary measure, but in an attempt to screw the bracket to the ceiling, she makes the mistake of putting her drill on in reverse. But in the end, she gets her first passing grade.

=== Hanging Mirrors ===
The contestants are to install four IKEA KRABB mirrors on a wall, in any configuration they choose.

- Darryl – The ongoing arguments between Darryl and Sara persist throughout the challenge, which Andrew sees as adversely affecting Darryl's performance. Dr. Julie V. Hill, the resident psychologist, suggests that Sara should tackle a challenge alone if this persistent negative behaviour continues. Sara finishes the challenge without Darryl's help, but no footage of Sara's work was shown.
- Merle – Merle is shown levelling his mirrors as he is installing them, which, to this point, he has eyeballed. Despite his newfound meticulousness, he only manages to finish three mirrors.
- Keith – No footage is shown of Keith's work, but he finishes hanging all four mirrors after 75 minutes; however, he uses an extra screw to keep the mirrors in place.
- Barry – No footage is shown of Barry's work, but he gives up after hanging three mirrors.
- Jeannie – Jeannie initially misinterprets the pictorial instructions of marking the wall with a pencil with nailing the hanging bracket in place with pencils as nails. She does, however, finish two mirrors.

=== Screwing a Hook ===
The final challenge is to hang a hook from their patched ceiling so that a plant can be supported on it. They then have the rest of the afternoon to redo and/or complete whatever previous tasks were unfinished (including decorating their apartment) for their final apartment inspections.

- Darryl – Darryl, after attaching his hook, focuses on getting his newly redesigned shelves into place. Darryl's ceiling patch fails to hold the weight of the plant.
- Merle – Merle, not wanting to be named the worst after cutting himself, is determined to get this right. After attaching the hook, Merle proceeds to tear down and redo his leaky plumbing. (During this time, the fourth mirror was also shown completed). Despite his incomplete plaster job (necessitated from having to redo his patch), the hook holds the weight of the plant.
- Keith – No footage of Keith's work is shown, although Keith's hook does hold the weight of the plant.
- Barry – Barry's mural has been completely redone, with a blue coat covering the bottom half of his wall. His hook holds the weight of the plant.
- Jeannie – Instead of trying to finish her challenges, Jeannie tries to hide all her incomplete work. Her hook holds the weight of the plant.

In the end, of the 19 individual challenges, Jeannie finishes the fewest with only three completed, while Keith and Barry complete four. Darryl has finished five challenges, while Merle has the most with eight.

== Episode 6: Curtain Call ==
In the final episode, the five contestants gear up for their final exam: the contests must work together to renovate a one-bedroom apartment (not unlike their own apartments) within ten hours. The tasks that must be done include the following:

- Tiling the bathroom wall
- Replacing a bathroom sink
- Replacing kitchen cabinets
- Installing vinyl tile on the kitchen floor
- Installing glass block in a pre-cut port between the kitchen and living room
- Drywalling the bedroom ceiling, which has already had strapping installed, including taping and plastering
- Wallpapering a single bedroom wall
- Building a television cabinet out of pine board
- Installing hardwood flooring in the living room using an adhesive (used as it is a concrete floor)

The contestants may also choose to ask for assistance from Greg or Robin once each during this challenge, for which the experts will assist them in whatever tasks are necessary for one hour. However, the nominators will not be helping their nominees, instead enjoying the action from a separate room, where their only task was to "assemble two futons." Jeannie begins the challenge by suggesting that a foreman be nominated (akin to how a foreman was nominated in all but the first yardwork challenges), a motion supported by Keith, but shot down by Merle. The nominators begin on their separate tasks: Merle going to do the bathroom sink, Darryl to the kitchen cabinets, Barry and Jeannie to the hardwood flooring, while Keith begins work on the TV unit—a disastrous start, as Andrew notes, as all of them had failed challenges relating to the tasks they would have to do (Merle with the kitchen sink, Darryl with his bed assembly and hanging doors, Barry and Jeannie with three floors and Keith with the shelves and his initial failure with his chair). Greg also believes it's a bad start, as the contestants are working from the floor and working their way up ("Things fall down," as Robin notes, to explain Greg's rationale that the drywall should be first). Robin later on also voices her opinion on Keith's choice of doing the furniture first ("You don't put the furniture in the room before you build the room"). In the bathroom, Merle begins by ripping out the sink, exposing a hole in the drywall and attempts to mount the new pedestal sink into the old sink bracket. It works, but the pedestal is too short. Reading the mounting instructions only confused him further. Keith, after cutting one board, takes a break and tries to use his break to assist Merle, but quits after reading the instructions. Merle, needing help in trying to get the pedestal to meet the sink, solicits Jeannie's help. Jeannie's advice to lower the sink elicits a round of applause from the nominators' room. Merle would eventually manage to remove the old bracket, put the pedestal in place, and balance the new sink on top of it, before measuring and installing the new brackets into place. However, Merle later found out he had measured incorrectly, and the pedestal remains too short. Merle then attempts to secure the pedestal in place, but realizes that he does not have the drill bit needed in order to drill into the concrete floor. Keith's assistance proves to be useless, as his belief that it is a problem with the drill settings and not the drill bit causes the existing drill bit to break. Completely frustrated with the sink, Merle decides to solicit advice from Barry on whether to just simply take the sink down and tile the bathroom first (which is the correct procedure), to which Barry replies in the affirmative. Barry begins his flooring by applying adhesive on the floor using a small putty knife instead of a large notched trowel, which, as Scot mentions, would take him too much time to complete. Furthermore, Barry decides to kick the first course of flooring into place. As Barry and Jeannie lay their tongue-in-groove floor down in courses (which is correct), they are still using very little glue, which they think (despite the massive supply) that they are being liberal with. As they move along, they use even less glue. In the next room, Darryl has managed to successfully take down the existing cabinets and is trying to assembling new ones. Meanwhile, all Keith has done in his first 90 minutes with the furniture is to make two cuts on a pine board and take three smoke breaks. At the lunchtime mark (two hours into the challenge), not a single task is completed. Barry suggests that the calls to Greg and Robin would not be made until the final hours when more manpower is needed instead of earlier when a plan on completion can be devised. Keith also expresses his intention to work with Darryl on the cabinets, which is news to Darryl as he had elected to take his lunch earlier so that he could work in silence, believing that the others were holding him back. As a result, Darryl sends Keith on a wild goose chase trying to look for screws. As the rest return to work, Barry has taken on the role of leader, laying out their plan to call Robin and Greg in with very little time remaining. Barry and Jeannie continue to work on the floor slowly—at their pace, the floor itself would be a 15-hour job. Keith continues to assist Darryl in mounting the assembled cabinets to the walls (although one fails to mount due to mismeasurement), while Merle is tiling the bathroom wall, correctly this time around (compared to his bathroom challenge). For a brief moment, everyone seemed to be working at the same time... until Keith takes his eighth break of the day and Jeannie manages to get a splinter in her finger while installing the floor (which had also vindicated Merle somewhat as he was no longer the only one who had injured themselves on the show after he cut himself during the upholstery challenge in the previous episode). At the 3.5-hour mark, the shed has been moved from the front yard of the Handyman Rehabilitation Centre to the roof in preparation of the finale by the crew. At that point, no tasks have been completed. Keith and Darryl have mounted the last cabinet and are preparing to hang the six cabinet doors. However, faced with the difficulty of hanging the doors, Keith walks off. Darryl also gives up on the cabinet doors to tackle the glass blocks (it is revealed here that the contestants had also attempted a glass block challenge earlier, although no mention of the challenge itself had aired in previous episodes, and that Darryl had performed poorly). Unable to form a plan on the glass block, Darryl returns to the cabinet doors. They manage to hang two, but they do not close together. At the same time, Merle, still in the bathroom, decides to go back to the plumbing as the tiling lay there incomplete, yet the pedestal has not been secured in place, forcing Merle to believe that the sink is drooping is because of improper bracket installation. He screws a pine board into the wall in an attempt to fix this and gets the help of Keith to handle securing the pedestal and hooking up the pipes while Merle gets the sink in position. Meanwhile, Barry and Jeannie continue their work on the floor, still using very little glue and still taking longer time than it should. After five hours of work, no tasks have been completed and Jeannie is believing that all their tasks are on the right track (despite the fact that none of the bedroom tasks have started). Keith and Darryl, still not having adjusted the doors, have moved on to Keith's original task of building the furniture. Keith's TV stand (consisting of three boards screwed to each other at this point), however, has the structural integrity of his Presbyterian Chair. Keith and Darryl expand upon that structure, although they do little to improve the piece's structural integrity. However, they can now claim that one task is complete. Merle contributes his share of the work when his plumbing is complete and his sink is tested and shown not to leak. The simple parts of his tiling is also complete, although he refuses to attempt the difficult areas (where cut tiles are necessary). This means that with 4.5 hours to go, three tasks are complete. As Keith takes his 15th smoke break, Merle begins to work on the glass block by first constructing a window frame for the port, while Barry and Jeannie continue to lay down hardwood. Darryl, in the meantime, has gotten all six doors mounted, but is making a fourth attempt at making them all balanced and close together. When Keith wants to partner with Darryl again, Darryl advises him to start the wallpaper, a bad decision considering that the drywall must be done first and that Keith had failed miserably in his drywall challenge. Keith starts off incorrectly again as he chooses to start wallpapering next to the door frame in the middle of the wall. Andrew convinces Keith that the wallpapering is incorrect, which only makes him take his 17th smoke break. As Andrew is trying to press Keith back to work, he learns that Keith and a crew member have made a wager, with the crew member betting ten dollars that the wallpapering would not be finished before time ran out. Andrew also accepts the bet (surprising Merle, who had also taken a break and was in on the conversation), believing that he's in for an easy $10. When Keith returns, he begins in the corner without taking down his first piece. His next piece isn't lined up at the seam, nor is his piece cut to get around the door frame. Because the wallpaper was started before the drywall, the strapping for the drywall is in the way and Keith is attempting to address this by removing the strapping, which he gives up after about a minute. His alternative method of working around the strapping is far worse, as it leaves a gap between the strips of wallpaper. Andrew convinces him that the wallpaper should be taken down and the drywall be attempted first. Meanwhile, Merle has completed the frame for the glass block window. Without the fame, the port is designed to hold five blocks per row with reasonable gap. However, with the frame in place, only four blocks can be accommodated per row. To address this, Merle accepts Barry's suggestion of making the space between the blocks wider. Merle, Darryl and Keith mix the adhesive (or rather, Darryl and Keith watch as Merle does the mixing). Merle makes the perfect mix, but Darryl's laying of the adhesive between the blocks pushes the mortar underneath each block out of line. Merle is also assisting Darryl by using his finger as a spacer and as a trowel. Barry also notices that the blocks are being installed on a slight slant instead of being level. Realizing that the project has become a disaster, he leaves Darryl alone with the job and goes to work on the drywall with Keith. Keith, however, takes this as the time for his 21st break. Barry and Jeannie have finally finished their hardwood floor after seven hours of work, although their floor is still several centimetres away from the wall. With only three hours remaining, Robin is given the call by Jeannie. When Robin enters, she immediately suggests taking down the wallpaper and doing the drywall, which Keith is tasked to do. Robin also suggests that the kitchen floor should also get started, as the adhesive requires an hour to get sufficiently sticky so that the tiles can be adhered onto the floor. Barry begins on applying the adhesive (which also forces Darryl to finish the glass block from the living room side). At the eight-hour mark, Barry makes the call to Greg. When Greg enters, he shows Merle and Keith how to use a "deadman" in order to prop the drywall up so that it can be screwed into place, and helps them complete the drywall. Merle then gets moving on the drywalling, while Keith takes his 24th break. Merle quickly reins Keith in, and manages to finish their drywalling with only 40 minutes to go. Although there is suitable time to do some plastering, Merle declares himself finished for the day. Andrew is forced to coax Merle and Keith (who had taken another break) back into work after telling them that quitting early may make them earn the title of Canada's Worst Handyman. While Merle gets back to work, Keith attempts the wallpapering one more time (this time with the drywall installed), but quickly gives up, taking another break. At this point, Andrew is convinced that he has won his ten dollars and Keith concedes defeat in their bet. Barry and Jeannie, in the meantime, continue with their adhesive, while Darryl, having finished the glass block, goes to work on getting the cabinet doors perfect. Barry's strategy of adhesive laying, however, soon gets all three into trouble, as the three are now boxed in by the adhesive, painting themselves into a corner (for which Scot and David make mock celebratory gestures). Undeterred by this, however, Barry begins laying down the tiles even though the adhesive has not been fully laid out, or anywhere near suitably sticky enough for the tiles to adhere to the floor. In fact, his application of the adhesive concurrently with the tile gets the adhesive over his new tiles not to mention the new hardwood floor and the new cupboards. In the haste to get everything finished, Darryl quickly puts handles on the cabinet doors without checking to see if the handles were level or aligned parallel to each other. With the final exam finished, Greg and Robin believe that everyone is still in the running for Canada's Worst Handyman: Darryl for the lack of planning skills, Jeannie for doing too little overall, Barry for not following directions, Keith for taking too many breaks and Merle because he is doing things too quickly. When the final exam is evaluated, only one (Merle's bathroom sink installation) of the contestants' eight completed works are given a passing grade. The final verdict: although his two floors were both awful, Barry is not Canada's Worst Handyman, as he has admitted to learning by failure. Jeannie is also free to go as well because, although she had injured herself, she quickly got right back into the game. Darryl's poor carpentry skills meant that he could still be Canada's Worst Handyman, while Keith's wallpapering meant that he, too, was still in the running. As for Merle, knowing how to do things right and getting the skills needed to get off his duct tape addiction, his aversion to measuring and, above all else, get his daughter's room finished makes him definitely not Canada's Worst Handyman. As he leaves, he makes a celebratory dance. Darryl and Keith meet Andrew atop the roof of the Handyman Rehabilitation Centre, where one will be named Canada's Worst Handyman and a final special lesson awaits them. As Andrew explains, Keith was not handy because he never bothered to play with tools, while Darryl was not handy because he was never allowed to use them. Keith had made the largest mess in the final exam, while Darryl had made the single largest blunder. Between the two, though, Darryl wins out and Keith is named Canada's Worst Handyman for his overall lack of focus, having taken 34 breaks during the final exam and changed projects 14 times, with none of them earning the passing grade.

== Episode 7: Best of the Worst ==
This is a recap episode, which detailed the adventures of each contestant through the rehabilitation process. The Handyman Rehabilitation Centre was demolished at the end of the episode.
