= List of George of the Jungle (2007 TV series) episodes =

This is a list of episodes for George of the Jungle.

== Series overview ==
Season	Episodes	Originally released		Season DVD release date (Region 1)
Season	Episodes	First released	Last released	Season DVD release date (Region 1)
1	26	June 29, 2007	January 11, 2008	July 23, 2009 (excluded 23 and 25-26)
2	26	September 10, 2016	February 18, 2017	—N/a

== Episodes ==
=== Season 1 (2007–08) ===
The reboot originally ran for twenty-four half-hour episodes (forty-eight 11-minute segments), with a two-part TV movie finale, all in a single season.

No.	Title	Written by	Canadian air date	American air date	Prod. code
1a	"Beetle Invasion"	Written by : Dave Lewman and Joe Liss; Storyboarded by : Dennis Crawford	June 29, 2007	February 15, 2008	101a
George must help stop a beetle infestation that he inadvertently started.
1b	"The Naked Ape Man"	Written by : Dennis Heaton; Storyboarded by : Lyn Hart	June 29, 2007	February 15, 2008	101b
George's lack of clothing is called into question.
2a	"Aromageddon"	Written by : Andrew Nicholls and Darrell Vickers; Storyboarded by : Jay Surridge	July 3, 2007	March 6, 2008	102a
George's body odor after a long time between baths has unforeseen consequences.
2b	"Found Temple of Gold"	Written by : Dennis Heaton; Storyboarded by : Tom Nesbitt, Lyn Hart, and Andy Bartlett	July 3, 2007	March 6, 2008	102b
George is tricked into taking a booby-trapped temple as his new home and desperately tries to undo the trade.
3a	"Cone Head"	Written by : Andrew Nicholls and Darrell Vickers; Storyboarded by : Dan Hughes	July 4, 2007	January 11, 2008	103a
George must wear a protective cone to keep from scratching an infected itch.
3b	"Cousin Larry of the Jungle"	Written by : Andrew Nicholls and Darrell Vickers; Storyboarded by : Mike West	July 4, 2007	January 18, 2008	103b
George's arrogant cousin Larry comes for a visit and problems quickly arise.
4a	"License to Swing"	Written by : Andy Guerdat and Steven Sullivan; Storyboarded by : Sean McCarron	July 5, 2007	January 11, 2008	104a
Ursula's new vine-swinging system is way too complicated, landing George in Ape's remedial safety class. While there, he falls in with the "bad kids".
4b	"My Own Private Hero"	Written by : Bart Jennett; Storyboarded by : Gerry Fournier	July 5, 2007	February 1, 2008	104b
It is Danger Season, when George's pledge to aid all jungle creatures is put to the test. When Big Mitch, a sneaky marmoset, tries to make George his personal danger servant, George's friends attempt to fill in for George and end up in danger themselves.
5a	"Lucky Pants"	Written by : David Lewman and Joe Liss; Storyboarded by : Jocelan Hillton	July 6, 2007	March 20, 2008	106a
A pair of underpants is seen as a good luck charm by George and the others. As a result, they each try to claim ownership of them.
5b	"Ape Ruth"	Written by : David Lewman and Joe Liss; Storyboarded by : Dan Hughes	July 6, 2007	March 20, 2008	106b
George and Ape square off in a series of competitive contests.
6a	"Don't Thank Me"	Written by : Evan Gore and Heather Lombard; Storyboarded by : Rob Boutilier	July 9, 2007	March 27, 2008	107a
George, Ursula and Magnolia go out of their way to thank Ape for everything (which started when Ape saved George, Ursula and a snake from being eaten by a man-eating plant) to the point where Ape tries to hide from them.
6b	"For the Love of Sloth"	Written by : Evan Gore and Heather Lombard; Storyboarded by : Kent Webb	July 9, 2007	March 27, 2008	107b
George is obsessed with a sloth becoming his friend.
7a	"Bathroom of the Apes"	Written by : Andrew Nicholls and Darrell Vickers; Storyboarded by : Gerry Fournier	July 10, 2007	April 3, 2008	108a
A legend about a curse placed on an outhouse by an ape king may come true.
7b	"Beauty vs. Beasts"	Written by : Paul Greenberg; Storyboarded by : Jos Humphrey	July 10, 2007	April 3, 2008	108b
George and his friends become obsessed with personal appearance and this is taken advantage of by a pair of scheming peacocks.
8a	"Star Power"	Written by : Andrew Nicholls and Darrell Vickers; Storyboarded by : Dennis Crawford	July 11, 2007	April 10, 2008	109a
George's jungle friends find that their wishes made when they see shooting stars are coming true.
8b	"L'il Orphan Anteater"	Written by : David Lewman and Joe Liss; Storyboarded by : Samuel To	July 11, 2007	April 10, 2008	109b
George cares for a young anteater that he believes is orphaned, but Shep is jealous.
9a	"The Vegemaster"	Written by : Evan Gore and Heather Lombard; Storyboarded by : Steve LeCouilliard	July 12, 2007	February 8, 2008	112a
George and his friends, facing a food shortage, travel to meet with a man who calls himself the Vegemaster.
9b	"Eagle Tick"	Written by : Steve Schnier; Storyboarded by : Mike West	July 12, 2007	February 8, 2008	112b
George gains the ability to fly after being bitten by an unusual bug.
10a	"The Snoring"	Written by : Mark Myers; Storyboarded by : Dennis Crawford	July 13, 2007	March 13, 2008	105a
George finds himself helpless to stop Ape's loud snoring at night.
10b	"George's Day Off"	Written by : Andrew Nicholls and Darrell Vickers; Storyboarded by : Samuel To	July 13, 2007	March 13, 2008	105b
At his friends' insistence, George takes a vacation away from the jungle. However, his friends quickly discover that George's duties are very difficult to fill in for.
11a	"Frankengeorge"	Written by : Andy Guerdat and Steven Sullivans; Storyboarded by : Jocelan Hillton	July 16, 2007	May 1, 2008	111a
A zombie curse threatens George and his friends. Everyone in the jungle is turned into zombies hungry for peanuts. Will Ursula escape from such a horrible nightmare?
11b	"Afraid of Nothing"	Written by : Andrew Nicholls and Darrell Vickers; Storyboarded by : Gerry Fournier	July 16, 2007	May 1, 2008	111b
George becomes paranoid after a scary campfire tale and turns his tree house into a fortress.
12a	"Brother George"	Written by : Andy Guerdat and Steven Sullivan; Storyboarded by : Sean McCarron	July 16, 2007	January 18, 2008	110a
George is tutored by several different gurus and finds he is supposed to be on three different sides for an upcoming battle.
12b	"Ape Mitzvah"	Written by : Reid Harrison; Storyboarded by : Jocelan Hillton	July 16, 2007	April 24, 2008	110b
While Ape goes through an annual rite of passage mandated by the Greater Ape Council, George tries to figure out what species he descended from.
13a	"Rebel Without a Claw"	Written by : Andrew Nicholls and Darrell Vickers; Storyboarded by : Dennis Crawford	July 25, 2007	April 24, 2008	114a
George and his friends try to teach the jungle animals to get along, but the natural order gets upset as a result. Note: The name of the episode is a reference to the movie Rebel Without a Cause.
13b	"Stripy Pony"	Written by : Tracy Berna; Storyboarded by : Tim Stuby	July 25, 2007	January 18, 2008	114b
Magnolia is determined to have a pony just like the one in her book.
14a	"Rainy Season"	Written by : Reid Harrison; Storyboarded by : Tim Stuby	August 1, 2007	May 15, 2008	115a
George tries to bring an end to a prolonged rainy spell, but the young rain spirit George talks with has other ideas.
14b	"Love in the Air"	Written by : Reid Harrison; Storyboarded by : Alex Basio	August 1, 2007	May 15, 2008	115b
The Tookie-Tookie Bird is in love with another bird and George cannot understand why such an emotion is so important.
15a	"George Skips Breakfast"	Written by : Andrew Nicholls and Darrell Vickers; Storyboarded by : Jos Humphrey	August 7, 2007	May 8, 2008	113a
George's preparing breakfast for his friends is interrupted by a play being conducted in the area.
15b	"Muscle Mania"	Written by : Rick Groel; Storyboarded by : Dan Hughes	August 7, 2007	May 8, 2008	113b
Magnolia desires to become stronger, but after bathing in a muscle mutation agent, she transforms into a much larger brute.
16a	"Selfish Shellfish"	Written by : Andrew Nicholls and Darrell Vickers; Storyboarded by : Marv Newland	August 15, 2007	May 22, 2008	116a
George finds a seashell on the ground and starts listening to the hermit crab inside constantly. Before long, he is ignoring his friends and treating them badly at the behest of the crab.
16b	"Volcano Pageant"	Written by : Neal Boushell and Sam O'Neal; Storyboarded by : Dan Hughes	August 15, 2007	May 22, 2008	116b
To cheer up a volcano that is supposedly bored, George and his friends put on a show to make it happy.
17a	"George Lays an Egg"	Written by : David Lewman and Joe Liss; Storyboarded by : John Flagg	August 22, 2007	June 5, 2008	117a
George finds a bird's egg with no sign of its mother and decides to care for it until it hatches.
17b	"Ape Goes Ape"	Written by : Colin Yardley and Adrian Vershinin; Storyboarded by : Jos Humphrey	August 22, 2007	June 5, 2008	117b
Big Mitch's persistent playing of the bongos causes Ape to dance constantly and George resolves to solve the problem.
18a	"Mantler, the Man with Antlers"	Written by : Evan Gore and Heather Lombard; Storyboarded by : Mike West	August 29, 2007	February 22, 2008	120a
George enters into a contest in a comic book with hopes of meeting his favorite superhero Mantler personally, but things do not turn out as planned.
18b	"Mount Georgemore"	Written by : Mark Drop; Storyboarded by : Samuel To	August 29, 2007	February 22, 2008	120b
George is stunned to see caricatures of himself carved into a nearby mountain by some of the jungle animals, but finds that it is not a popular thing with many of his friends.
19a	"George's Birthday Present"	Written by : Neal Boushell and Sam O'Neal; Storyboarded by : John Flagg	September 12, 2007	June 12, 2008	121a
George's friends learn that George has never celebrated his birthday and set out to get him the ultimate birthday gift.
19b	"Witching Stick"	Written by : Rick Groel; Storyboarded by : Sean McCarron	September 12, 2007	June 12, 2008	121b
George endeavours to replace the Witch Doctor's stick that he accidentally broke.
20a	"Trouble with Bananaquats"	Written by : Catherine Lieuwen; Storyboarded by : Steve LeCouilliard	September 19, 2007	May 29, 2008	119a
The appearance of bananaquats, which grow once every five years, and the effect they have on Ape has George and Magnolia fearing that bad times lay ahead.
20b	"Spoiled King"	Written by : Mike Weiss; Storyboarded by : Colin Jack	September 19, 2007	May 29, 2008	119b
George and his friends deal with the antics of a spoiled movie star couple.
21a	"Extreme Lamebrains"	Written by : Meredith Jennings-Offen; Storyboarded by : Samuel To	September 26, 2007	January 25, 2008	118a
Two visitors who record and participate in extremely dangerous stunts visit the jungle. Before long, they have George and Ape doing stunts as well, though all four ultimately are in extreme danger as a result.
21b	"Still Got It"	Written by : Randi Barnes; Storyboarded by : Mike West	September 26, 2007	January 25, 2008	118b
Two legendary pranksters from the past make life difficult for George and the jungle animals.
22a	"A Boy and His Elephant"	Written by : Mark Drop; Storyboarded by : Dan Hughes	October 11, 2007	June 19, 2008	122a
George decides Shep needs to be trained to make him more obedient to George's requests.
22b	"George's Security Stone"	Written by : Jenna Jolovitz; Storyboarded by : Jocelan Hillton	October 11, 2007	June 19, 2008	122b
George loses his security stone and searches the jungle to find it and regain his lost confidence.
23a	"Jungle Bells"	Written by : Tracy Berna; Storyboarded by : Colin Jack	November 7, 2007	December 21, 2007	123a
Ursula, recalling memories of Christmas past, is determined to celebrate Christmas in the jungle, though George and the others are not quite as enthusiastic. Note: This episode is excluded from The Swingin' First Season DVD box set.
23b	"The Goat of Christmas Presents"	Written by : Charlotte Fullerton; Storyboarded by : Colin Jack	November 7, 2007	December 21, 2007	123b
On the day after Christmas, everybody (except Ursula) decides to have Christmas again and again. Note: This episode is excluded from The Swingin' First Season DVD box set.
24a	"Second Banana"	Written by : Andy Guerdat and Steven Sullivan; Storyboarded by : Alex Basio	November 14, 2007	June 26, 2008	124a
Ape tries to be a hero just like his friend George.
24b	"One with Nature"	Written by : Catherine Lieuwen; Storyboarded by : Alex Basio	November 14, 2007	June 26, 2008	124b
George sets out to meditate and change his grumpy outlook.
25	"Escape from Madmun Island"	Story by : Andrew Nicholls and Darrell Vickers; Teleplay by : Andrew Nicholls, Darrell Vickers, and Evan Gore; Storyboarded by : Dennis Crawford	January 11, 2008	August 17, 2008	125
26	"Escape from Madmun Island"	Story by : Andrew Nicholls and Darrell Vickers; Teleplay by : Andrew Nicholls, Darrell Vickers, and Evan Gore; Storyboarded by : Gerry Fournier	January 11, 2008	August 17, 2008	126
George and his friends seek to rescue people trapped on an island populated by mysterious animals and a person who is secretly watching their every move and try to save themselves from the robotic menaces and traps set by the ruler of Madmun Island. Note 1: This episode is a 44-minute made-for-television movie. Note 2: This episode is excluded from The Swingin' First Season DVD box set.

=== Season 2 (2016–17) ===
In 2016, the series was revived for a second season that premiered on September 10, 2016.

No. overall	No. in season	Title	Written by	Canadian air date	Prod. code
27a	1a	"Bringing Silverback"	Richard Elliott and Simon Racioppa	September 10, 2016	201a
27b	1b	"Of Botflies and Men"	Richard Elliott and Simon Racioppa	September 10, 2016	201b
28a	2a	"The Insider"	Richard Elliott and Simon Racioppa	September 17, 2016	202a
28b	2b	"Clockwork George"	Richard Elliott and Simon Racioppa	September 17, 2016	202b
29a	3a	"True Bromance"	Dale Schott	September 24, 2016	203a
29b	3b	"George x 4"	Dan Williams and Lienne Sawatsky	September 24, 2016	203b
30a	4a	"As Strong As He Can Tree"	Richard Elliott and Simon Racioppa	October 1, 2016	204a
30b	4b	"George’s Song"	Dan Williams and Lienne Sawatsky	October 1, 2016	204b
31a	5a	"Queen of the Desert"	Dan Williams	October 8, 2016	205a
31b	5b	"Kings and Little Ones"	Dale Schott	October 8, 2016	205b
32a	6a	"Renaissance Ape"	Richard Elliott and Simon Racioppa	October 15, 2016	206a
32b	6b	"My Georging Jacket"	Richard Elliott and Simon Racioppa	October 15, 2016	206b
33a	7a	"Bananium Deficiency"	Josh Sager and Jerome Simpson	October 22, 2016	207a
33b	7b	"I Gotta Beave Me"	Mike Kiss	October 22, 2016	207b
34a	8a	"Nature’s Call"	Josh Sager and Jerome Simpson	October 29, 2016	208a
34b	8b	"Much Ado About Stuffing"	Ian MacIntyre	October 29, 2016	208b
35a	9a	"Steve of the Jungle"	Richard Elliott and Simon Racioppa	November 5, 2016	209a
35b	9b	"Guess What’s Coming to Dinner"	Dale Schott	November 5, 2016	209b
36a	10a	"Meet Meat"	Simon Racioppa and Richard Elliott	November 12, 2016	210a
36b	10b	"Body Politics"	Dan Williams	November 12, 2016	210b
37a	11a	"Sour Milk"	Dale Schott	November 19, 2016	211a
37b	11b	"Valley of the Magnolias"	Simon Racioppa and Richard Elliott	November 19, 2016	211b
38a	12a	"For Science"	Dale Schott	November 26, 2016	212a
38b	12b	"Cute Is As Cute Does"	Ian MacIntyre	November 26, 2016	212b
39a	13a	"Shadow of a Dolt"	Richard Elliott and Simon Racioppa	December 3, 2016	213a
39b	13b	"Lovecano"	Ian MacIntyre	December 3, 2016	213b
40a	14a	"Strange Daze"	Josh Sager and Jerome Simpson	January 7, 2017	214a
40b	14b	"Lying Cloth"	Mike Kiss	January 7, 2017	214b
41a	15a	"Mess of Kings"	Dan Williams and Lienne Sawatsky	January 8, 2017	215a
41b	15b	"Rip van George"	Dale Schott	January 8, 2017	215b
42a	16a	"Mama Chicago"	Richard Elliott and Simon Racioppa	January 14, 2017	216a
42b	16b	"Reversum Day"	Richard Elliott and Simon Racioppa	January 14, 2017	216b
43a	17a	"Swirl"	Richard Elliott and Simon Racioppa	January 15, 2017	217a
43b	17b	"Junior Jungle Achievers"	Simon Racioppa and Richard Elliott	January 15, 2017	217b
44a	18a	"Wet Behind the Ears"	Josh Sager and Jerome Simpson	January 21, 2017	218a
44b	18b	"Georgus Ex Machina"	Simon Racioppa and Richard Elliott	January 21, 2017	218b
45a	19a	"Breaking Ape"	Ethan Banville	January 28, 2017	219a
45b	19b	"Sidekick Chicago"	Dale Schott	January 28, 2017	219b
46a	20a	"The Ursula Solution"	Simon Racioppa and Richard Elliott	January 29, 2017	220a
46b	20b	"George Lays an Egg"	Simon Racioppa and Richard Elliott	January 29, 2017	220b
47a	21a	"Excalibanana"	Simon Racioppa and Richard Elliott	January 22, 2017	221a
47b	21b	"The Flavour of Science"	Richard Clark	January 22, 2017	221b
48a	22a	"The George Who Would Be King"	Dale Schott	February 4, 2017	222a
48b	22b	"The Peel of Fate"	Dan Williams and Lienne Sawatsky	February 4, 2017	222b
49a	23a	"Were-George"	Richard Clark	February 5, 2017	223a
49b	23b	"Master of Macho"	Simon Racioppa and Richard Elliott	February 5, 2017	223b
50a	24a	"Trial by Jungle"	Simon Racioppa and Richard Elliott	February 11, 2017	224a
50b	24b	"Slothpocalypto"	Dale Schott	February 11, 2017	224b
51a	25a	"Beave Us Alone"	Dan Williams and Lienne Sawatsky	February 12, 2017	225a
51b	25b	"Original Jungle Kings"	Richard Clark	February 12, 2017	225b
52a	26a	"The Last Treehugger"	Simon Racioppa and Richard Elliott	February 18, 2017	226a
52b	26b	"Heart of Gold"	Simon Racioppa and Richard Elliott	February 18, 2017	226b

== See also ==
- George of the Jungle (2007 TV series)
