= List of Departures episodes =

This is a list of episodes from the OLN adventure travel television series Departures. The list is ordered by the chronology of the air date.

== Episodes ==
=== Season 1 ===
| No. | Title | Original release date |
|---|---|---|
| 1 | "Canada: Ocean to Ocean" | February 18, 2008 |
| 2 | "Jordan" | February 25, 2008 |
| 3 | "India: Sacred Ground (Places and Festivals)" | March 24, 2008 |
| 4 | "India: Quest for Himalayas (Ladakh)" | March 31, 2008 |
| 5 | "Ascension Island" | April 7, 2008 |
| 6 | "Japan: The Future" | April 14, 2008 |
| 7 | "Japan: The Past" | April 21, 2008 |
| 8 | "Cook Islands" | April 28, 2008 |
| 9 | "New Zealand: Risks & Rewards" | May 5, 2008 |
| 10 | "New Zealand: Adrenaline" | May 12, 2008 |
| 11 | "Thailand" | May 19, 2008 |
| 12 | "Cambodia" | May 26, 2008 |
| 13 | "Canada: Pushing North" | June 2, 2008 |

=== Season 2 ===
| No. | Title | Original release date |
|---|---|---|
| 1 | "Morocco" | January 25, 2009 |
| 2 | "Libya" | February 1, 2009 |
| 3 | "Brazil: Piranha Soup" | February 8, 2009 |
| 4 | "Brazil: Treading Water" | February 15, 2009 |
| 5 | "Cuba" | February 22, 2009 |
| 6 | "Mongolia: Tribes and Tribulations" | March 1, 2009 |
| 7 | "Mongolia: Meals and Wheels" | March 8, 2009 |
| 8 | "Iceland" | March 15, 2009 |
| 9 | "Zambia" | March 22, 2009 |
| 10 | "Madagascar" | March 29, 2009 |
| 11 | "Chile: Ups and Downs" | April 5, 2009 |
| 12 | "Chile: Ends of the Earth" | April 12, 2009 |
| 13 | "Antarctica" | April 19, 2009 |

=== Season 3 ===
| No. | Title | Original release date |
|---|---|---|
| 1 | "Russia: Comrades and Capitals" | March 6, 2010 |
| 2 | "Russia: The Bull of Winter" | March 13, 2010 |
| 3 | "Sri Lanka" | March 20, 2010 |
| 4 | "Vietnam" | March 27, 2010 |
| 5 | "Papua New Guinea: Fire and Water" | April 3, 2010 |
| 6 | "Papua New Guinea: Without a Paddle" | April 10, 2010 |
| 7 | "Ecuador" | April 17, 2010 |
| 8 | "Ethiopia: Saints & Snakes" | April 24, 2010 |
| 9 | "Ethiopia: Dances with Bulls" | May 1, 2010 |
| 10 | "Rwanda" | May 8, 2010 |
| 11 | "Greenland" | May 15, 2010 |
| 12 | "North Korea: The Other Side" | May 22, 2010 |
| 13 | "North Korea: The Musical" | May 29, 2010 |
| 14 | "Indonesia: Ring of Fire" | June 5, 2010 |
| 15 | "Indonesia: A Home Away" | June 12, 2010 |
| 16 | "Australia" | June 19, 2010 |
