= List of The Amazing Spiez! episodes =

The Amazing Spiez! is an animated television series produced by the French company Marathon Media and the Canadian company Image Entertainment Corporation. It is a spinoff of Totally Spies!. The main characters in the show are Lee, Marc, Megan, Tony, Cal, Karen, Tami and Jerry. The series premiered on 15 March 2009, and debuted on one of its original channels, TF1, on 1 April 2009. Its final episode was broadcast on 25 May 2012. 16 were unaired in the U.S.

== Series overview ==
Series	Episodes	Originally released	
Series	Episodes	First released	Last released
1	26	15 March 2009	26 February 2010
2	26	5 July 2010	25 May 2012

== Episodes ==
=== Season 1 (2009–10) ===
No. overall	No. in season	Title	Mission no.	Original release date	Prod. code
1	1	"Operation Fun and Games (French: Mission : Diabolique)"	431	15 March 2009	127
Early one morning, the Clark siblings are sent on a mission to stop a villain who is destroying a Japanese city. Upon arrival, however, they discover that the villain is invisible! The criminal manages to escape, but the Spiez find a clue: a fingerprint on Tony's arm. Later, Jerry sends the team to investigate a series of mysterious disappearances. While looking into the matter, the Spiez discover playing cards modified to alter DNA, corrupt players, and grant them mysterious powers. The culprit behind the cards is none other than Jimmy, the game's world champion, who wants to hold onto his title. When Tony touches one of the cards and turns evil, he gains incredible super-strength. Fortunately, Megan, Marc, and Lee manage to defeat Jimmy and return Tony, along with the other card-game fans (who had also been transformed into villains) to normal. In the B-story, Tony is tired of always being small, so Jerry offers him a training session at WOOHP to help him get stronger. Villain: Jimmy Note: Jimmy is a spoof of Yugi from the Yu-Gi-Oh! franchise and the monsters could be based on comics such as X-Men. Around the end you can see a picture of the knowledge-stealing machine from the "evil roommate" episode from Totally Spies and during the ride to the first victim's home, Lee explains that that was the victim's house, but Marc's voice is coming out of Lee's mouth.
2	2	"Operation Dyno-Might! (French: Mission : Préhistorique)"	712	21 March 2009	128
The Clark children are on a school trip to the Natural History Museum. However, while they are at the dinosaur exhibit, a T-Rex comes to life and attacks them! Fortunately, the Spiez manage to defeat the T-Rex and discover a strange device attached to it. Later, the Spiez are summoned by Jerry to investigate the awakening of a dormant volcano. While searching the area, they discover a cave where several dinosaur skeletons are stored. In addition, the skeletons come to life! It turns out to be the work of the Caveman, a paleontologist who wants dinosaurs to return to the Earth's surface and is using them to terrorize the city. It is up to the Spiez to defeat the Caveman and bring him to WOOHP prison. In the B-story, Megan and her brothers are convinced that their parents are expecting a baby girl. Megan is thrilled, as she will no longer be the only girl in the family. Villain: Caveman
3	3	"Operation Spy-Sitter (French: Mission : Baby-sitter)"	593	22 March 2009	129
The Clark parents plan to spend a romantic evening outdoors and leave their children with a babysitter named Melinda. Megan, Marc, and Tony are thrilled, but Lee dislikes the idea of having a babysitter: he is 13 and can look after himself! Later, Jerry informs the Spiez about the mysterious disappearance of two WOOHP agents, and they launch an investigation. They then receive a distress call from a third agent. Although they cannot prevent the abduction in time, they discover a clue: a strange, skin-like substance. After the investigation, the Spiez spend time with their babysitter. However, Lee still hates the idea of having a babysitter, especially when his siblings tease him about it. He decides to sneak out of the house, but he is suddenly captured by Mel, a former spy posing as Melinda! He is the one who kidnapped all the WOOHP agents, and his plan is to eliminate them. This forces Megan, Marc, and Tony to stop Mel and rescue their older brother and the other agents. In the B-story, Lee wants to prove that he doesn't need a babysitter and can take care of himself. Villain: Mel (Former WOOHP Spy) Note: Britney, Blaine and Dean (from Totally Spies!) appear as cameos in this episode.
4	4	"Operation Wheels of Thunder (French: Mission : Skateboard)"	274	22 March 2009	130
Marc, Lee, and Tony are preparing for a big skateboarding competition. Megan decides to enter as well after being teased by her brothers, but she can't skate as well as they can. Later, Jerry sends the Spiez on a mission to Dubai. A mysterious earthquake ravages the city, and the Spiez find a clue: strange rock traces. Back home, Megan receives a delivery—a new skateboard—but she suddenly vanishes while practicing to ride it. When Marc, Lee, and Tony discover their sister is missing, they set out to find her and learn that Stony Falcon, a former skateboarding legend, is behind it all. He has created an army of skateboarders to destroy the world. Why? To take revenge on those who banned skateboarding in public places! The three boys must rescue their sister and defeat the skateboarder and his army. In the B-story, Megan wants to become a skilled skateboarder like her brothers so she can win the skateboarding competition. Villain: Stony Falcon (Champion Skateboarder and a parody of skateboarder Tony Hawk) Note: Jerry is shown to be thinking of Sam, Alex and Clover. A brand new version of GLADIS appears.
5	5	"Operation Brat Pack (French: Mission : Agents doubles)"	365	28 March 2009	131
Jerry summons the Spiez for a special mission: they must protect Brock Chambers, a famous spy actor who has received multiple threats while filming. To keep a close watch on him, Jerry concocts a cereal box contest that the Spiez "win," thereby bringing their parents to the studio. During filming, Brock is kidnapped. After assessing the situation and finding a few clues, the Spiez eventually discover that former star Bucky Alder is behind it all. He had been replaced because he was growing too fast and no longer had the right look for the role. Hoping to reclaim his old part, he plans to eliminate Brock, the current star. The team must do everything they can to stop Bucky and protect Brock. In the B-story, Megan lands the lead role in a school play, which goes to her head. At the same time, she develops a crush on Brock and showers him with attention throughout the mission. Villain: Bucky Alder (former actor)
6	6	"Operation Terrible Thirteen (French: Mission : Anniversaire d'enfer)"	176	3 April 2009	132
An experiment is stolen from a laboratory, and at the same time, teenagers around the world are transforming into mutants on their thirteenth birthdays! Jerry hears about the situation and soon receives a red alert from Vancouver. When the Spiez are sent there, they come face-to-face with mutant twins sporting claws and fangs! Fortunately, they manage to defeat the mutants. Jerry then sends the Spiez to California to investigate a genetics lab. While assessing the situation, they discover that a girl named Kat is behind it all. Devastated by her own birthdays, she stole technology from her father's lab to turn teenagers into mutants. Once the task is complete, she plans to throw the best party ever! The team must take Kat down and reverse the mutation affecting her victims before the condition becomes permanent. In the B-story, Tami is organizing a party for thirteenth birthday. Megan wants an invitation, so she tries to act cool to convince Tami to invite her. Villain: Kat
7	7	"Operation Break-Out (French: Mission : Prison)"	679	11 April 2009	135
Jerry informs the Spiez that a WOOHP microchip has been stolen. The chip contains the codes for the WOOHP prison. So, when the Spiez arrive at the prison, Lee and Marc disguise themselves as WOOHP prisoners and head inside. While investigating, they soon find a clue that leads them to one of WOOHP's well-known villains: The Juggler. The Spiez must then track down The Juggler and stop him before he uses the codes on the chip! In the B-story, Megan helps Tony get a date for respect, but things get out of hand when Tony gets FIVE dates. Villain: The Juggler Note: When the Spiez get hit with the laughing gas you can hear Tony say "we're doomed" twice.
8	8	"Operation Cruisin' for a Bruisin' (French: Mission : Croisière d'enfer)"	848	6 June 2009	134
Jerry isn't feeling well because he has a bad cold. Hoping for a cure, he sends the Spiez to the Himalayas. They find a rare flower for the cold, but get caught in an avalanche. However, they manage to escape and return home. Upon their return, they discover a surprise: their parents are taking them on a cruise! Later, while the Clarks are enjoying the cruise, Jerry informs the Spiez that someone has stolen files from WOOHP. During the investigation, the Spiez notice their parents behaving very strangely—so strangely, in fact, that they are acting like villains who want to eliminating them! The Spiez eventually discover that the villain who broke into WOOHP and stole the files is Davey Hacker, a ten-year-old boy. He plans to control Cal and Karen to defeat and eliminate their children. Why? Because they were chosen to become WOOHP agents, and he wasn't! In the B-story, the Spiez have to cure Jerry's cold, but it turns out it is actually just an allergy to his new pillow, which means they were sent to the Himalayas for nothing. Villain: Davey Hacker (Former spy candidate for WOOHP) Note: Even though the mission is 848, this is the first time they meet Davey. In Operation The 50 Ft. Hacker, the mission number is 556, showing a continuity error on the show.
9	9	"Operation Gus Jr. (French: Mission : Gus Junior)"	407	7 June 2009	133
Someone is using a ray gun to transform new, modern items into outdated ones from the 90s! When Jerry hears about these strange crimes occurring around the world, he sends the Spiez to investigate. They discover that DNA evidence from one of the crime scenes links directly to a known WOOHP villain: Boogie Gus. However, Gus is locked up in the WOOHP prison, so it turns out his son, Gus Jr., is the one behind it all! He wants to destroy the world as it is and replace modern items with older oneso from the 90s! The team must stop Gus Jr. and restore everything to its new and improved state. In the B-story, Marc wants to give his parents a gift for their wedding anniversary. He hopes to receive a gift in return for his birthday, specifically a robot. Villain: Gus Jr. (Boogie Gus's son) Note: Sam, Clover and Alex were referenced again when Jerry researched Boogie Gus.
10	10	"Operation Dare Devil (French: Mission : Casse-cou)"	713	14 June 2009	139
A mysterious stuntman known as the "Human Projectile" is being talked about all over the internet with his stunts. Meanwhile, Jerry informs the Spiez about a series of heists targeting high-security laboratories belonging to Techammer, the company behind the latest video game. The way the attacks are carried out suggests the Human Projectile is the culprit, and indeed, he is. As the king of stunts, he is furious that Techammer used his likeness to release a game without his permission. The Spiez will have to use their ingenuity to catch the Human Projectile. In the B-story, Lee gets braces at the dentist and later develops a crush on Mia Techammer, the owner of Techammer, who also wears braces. Villain: The Human Projectile
11	11	"Operation Rival Schools (French: Mission : Proviseur fou)"	311	20 June 2009	137
The annual School Olympiad is approaching fast! The Clark siblings' school has been participating in the competition for years. Jerry later sends them to investigate a series of bizarre attacks on schools across the city. The attacks are so violent that some schools have been forced to withdraw from the Olympiad entirely! As the Spiez expand their investigation, they discover that Principal Farley, the principal of Oak Knolls Jr. High, which finishes last in the Olympiad every year, is behind the attacks. He has used technology to transform his students, making them stronger, faster, and endowed with superhuman abilities to help them win the Olympiad this time around. The team must work together to stop the principal and his wild students, especially when the latter go on a senseless rampage in the gymnasium. In the B-story, Lee decides to drastically change his behavior and act childish and immature after his siblings tease him for acting like a parent. Villain: Principal Farley
12	12	"Operation Sunrise Tan (French: Mission : Bronzage d'enfer)"	267	27 June 2009	138
Tami arrives at school sporting a stunning orange tan called a Sunrise Tan, which comes from a new spray-tanning machine. Megan thinks the idea is ridiculous, but her brothers and the other boys at school are instantly smitten with Tami, making her the center of attention. Later, the Spiez are at WOOHP, where Jerry briefs them on various strange conflicts occurring around the world. While investigating, they uncover clues that lead them to Zoe Quinn. It turns out Zoe is the one behind it all. Furious at her boyfriend for dumping her, she decided to take revenge by creating a very special spray tan, which is the Sunrise Tan that Tami has! Moreover, the tan contains a special substance that attracts men to any woman wearing it, explaining why all the boys are crazy about Tami. Megan has to save the day on her own. In the B-story, Megan's brothers fight for Tami's attention because of her tan. Villain: Zoe Quinn Note: The evil scheme is similar to the one in Totally Spies episode "Green with N.V." The differences are, Sunrise Tan makes the men fight over the girl, and girls "benefit" from the product.
13	13	"Operation Chameleon Leon (French: Mission : Caméléon)"	613	8 August 2009	113
Jerry informs the Spiez that a bank has been robbed, yet there is no trace of the suspect! Upon arrival, the Spiez review the security camera footage. The bank is completely empty, with no sign of a thief! Later, Jerry sends Megan and Tony to Paris to deal with an attack. But while confronting the threat, Tony is abducted by an invisible force! However, a clue is found: a piece of green chameleon skin. The Spiez discover that the skin belongs to Leon, a chameleon capable of blending into his surroundings. It turns out that Leon is the mastermind behind it all and plans to take over WOOHP and create an army of chameleons. Marc, Lee, and Megan must find and rescue their younger brother so they can regroup and stop the chameleon. In the B-story, Tami steals and copies all of Megan's looks, which angers her. Villain: Chameleon Leon Error: Chameleon Leon returns in Mission No. 420.
14	14	"Operation Dude Ranch Disaster (French: Mission : Super détente)"	192	15 August 2009	140
After accidentally letting a villain escape during a mission, the Spiez get angry with each other and start arguing, and can no longer work as a team! Jerry, alarmed by their bickering, decides to offer them a well-deserved break at WOOHP's Dude Ranch. Upon arrival, the agents are pleased to see the wide range of activities offered by Tex, the ranch manager. Also, Sam, Clover, Alex, and Dean, WOOHP's original spies, are there too! The Spiez are thrilled to spend time with them during the activities, but the dream turns into a nightmare when their new friends start mysteriously disappearing, one by one! Not only that, but Tex starts acting really strangely, leading the team to suspect he's behind it all. In the end, the Spiez discover that Tex is Jerry in disguise. He staged everything so the Spiez could put their differences aside, mend their relationships, and work as a team again! Villain: Tex (Jerry in disguise) Note: This is a crossover between Totally Spies! and The Amazing Spiez!.
15	15	"Operation WOOCSI (French: Mission : Espion d'élite)"	987	22 August 2009	115
At WOOHP, Jerry announces the results of the latest spy test: Marc is the smartest spy in WOOHP history. To everyone's astonishment, Marc is assigned to the new elite section: WOOCSI, led by Jerry's sister, Sherry. Meanwhile, Tony, Lee, and Megan are on a mission to investigate the disappearance of several brilliant scientists. They find a clue: a red residue. However, they lose their first clue due to a trapdoor. The mission starts to get difficult without Marc. Back home, things get even stranger and more complicated when they discover Marc watching television with the mindset of a five-year-old. They eventually discover that Sherry is behind it all. Jealous of Jerry's success, she has plotted to capture Marc and the famous scientists in order to steal their intelligence and transfer it to herself. And once she has completed her task, she plans to eliminate her brother and take control of WOOHP! In the B-story, Lee, Megan, and Tony are fed up with Marc bragging about his intelligence, but they realize how much they need their brother when his intelligence declines. Villain: Sherry Lewis (Jerry's sister) Note: This episode was reference of the American television series CSI: Crime Scene Investigation and similar to the Totally Spies episode "Brain Drain".
16	16	"Operation Grow Up (French: Mission : Destruction)"	668	29 August 2009	116
Several museums, libraries, and other cultural buildings are being attacked in strange ways. When Jerry tasks the Spiez with investigating, they discover that someone has demolished the buildings to replace them with playgrounds and amusement parks. Later, an attack occurs at the Museum of Natural History. As the Spiez confront the attack, Tony is suddenly struck by a mysterious laser, causing him to age rapidly. His voice also deepens, and he grows a beard. How is this possible? Because the laser that struck him is accelerating his aging process! The Spiez eventually discover that an 8-year-old boy named Archibald Cranton is the source. Tired of being a small child, he stole a growth laser to destroy all the museums and libraries and replace them with playgrounds and amusement parks. The Spiez must defeat Archibald and return Tony to his normal 11-year-old self, even if he doesn't really want to turn back to normal. In the B-story, Tony wants to join the school choir. Villain: Archibald Cranton (an 8 year old kid)
17	17	"Operation Buzz Off (French: Mission : Ruche infernale)"	217	3 September 2009	117
When WOOHP hears about several scientists who have been frozen in place with horrified expressions on their faces, Jerry sends the Spiez to investigate. They look into the recent incident at a Japanese lab and discover that the victims were covered in a strange yellow layer when they were frozen, so they send Jerry a sample, along with a strange, sharp object they found as evidence. After analysis, Jerry reveals that the sharp object is a giant bee stinger and the yellow substance is highly resistant beeswax. The Spiez quickly discover that Victoria Brathwaite is behind it all. A former member of a bee research project, she was dismissed by her former colleagues for integrating bee DNA with human DNA, so she transformed into a bee for revenge. Once she achieves her goal, she plans to raise an army of bees to take over the world. The Spiez must prevent this from happening and defeat the bee. In the B-story, the children's aunt, Trudy, comes to visit them. And driven by her snoopy nature, she secretly follows her niece and nephews on their mission. Villain: Victoria Brathwaite
18	18	"Operation Pet Peeved (French: Mission : Animaux rebelles)"	675	24 October 2009	136
Jerry informs the Spiez about locations being attacked by strange creatures. So they take action: Megan and Tony head to Texas to investigate a farm, while Lee and Marc visit a cosmetics lab in Canada. During their investigations, they discover some truly bizarre clues: the tracks of an animal walking upright on two legs and a bat's fang! When they send the clues to Jerry, they discover that the source is a group of half-animal, half-human beings! They quickly discover that a teenager named Derek is behind it all. An animal rights activist, he is outraged by animal abuse and wants to inject these animals with human DNA to incite them to revolt against their owners! But soon, the creatures turn on Derek and wreak havoc at the school's annual fair! The Spiez must stop these completely crazy half-human, half-animal beings. In the B-story, Tony wants to have his own pet, but since his parents will never allow him to have one, he decides to make friends out of socks and stones. Villain: Derek This episode is likely to have the same theme in Totally Spies episode "Animal World."
19	19	"Operation Crabby Bob (French: Mission : Eaux troubles)"	198	30 October 2009	118
Several cargo ships have mysteriously disappeared into the ocean. Jerry hears about this strange situation and sends the Spiez to find out what happened. They discover that the shipwrecks are at the bottom of the ocean, completely empty. As the investigation progresses, a mysterious whirlpool swallows Lee! However, the remaining Spiez discover a clue: lobster claw marks. Analysis soon leads them to Crabby Bob, meaning he's behind it all. Unhappy with how humans mistreat the sea, he decides to create an army of lobsters to engulf all the world's coastlines and create an underwater world instead! Tony, Marc, and Megan soon find Lee, and luckily, they manage to defeat the lobster and his army. In the B-story, Marc has a crush on a girl at school and wants to impress her. Villain: Crabby Bob
20	20	"Operation Old School (French: Mission : Mamie)"	203	3 November 2009	125
The Earth is going wild! Several climate disasters have occurred around the world, including a pollution cloud over Calgary and the awakening of a volcano! When Jerry hears about these damaging situations, he sends the Spiez to find out how these disasters happened. Upon investigation, they discover that the cause of these incidents is contributing to global warming. They also learn that the origin is the work of a human. When this information reaches Jerry, he learns that someone tried to destroy the security system in the "senior citizens' quarters" of WOOHP Prison. After conducting their investigation, they discover that the culprit is none other than the Granny, one of Sam, Clover, and Alex's original villains. She is responsible for all this global warming because she and her friends, Bubby and Papa, find their cell in the WOOHP Prison far too cold. Disappointed by this, they decide to get revenge by warming up the entire planet! The Spiez must hurry and defeat the old villains before their climate change becomes irreversible. In the B-story, Megan decides to replace all the household products with more eco-friendly alternatives, which her brothers find disgusting. Villain: The Granny, Bubby, and Papa (all three of whom appeared in the Totally Spies! episode "The Granny": Sam, Clover and Alex are mentioned by Granny as "those girly spies WOOHP sent after us". Plus when Sam, Alex, and Clover are briefed about granny, Alex says she should call her own Granny just as Tony said that they should visit their Granny.)
21	21	"Operation Desert Rescue (French: Mission : Revanche)"	420	3 December 2009	120
While Karen is showing a house to a potential buyer, she suddenly disappears without a trace! And later that night, she doesn't come home. The next day, Jerry assigns the Spiez to investigate other spy agencies that have been attacked. After battling a rogue machine, they find their mother's necklace on the floor. Worried, Lee calls their mother to make sure she's okay, but she doesn't answer. After analyzing the situation, they discover that Chameleon Leon is back. Even worse, he has captured Karen and manipulated her with an evil chip to carry out his wicked orders! The Spiez must do everything they can to defeat Leon and save their mother. In the B-story, Marc is starting to develop a fear of heights because of his previous missions, and he must find a way to overcome it, or he'll be useless as a spy and fail gym class. Villain: Chameleon Leon (2) Note: At the end of the episode it has a close-up of Marc's siblings before he dives, there is another Marc standing next to them when Marc is on the diving board. After that scene the "clone" promptly disappears.
22	22	"Operation The 50 Ft. Hacker (French: Mission : Méga attaque !)"	556	19 December 2009	121
Someone has broken into the WOOHP gadget lab and stolen one of the gadgets! Jerry tasks the Spiez with taking inventory and investigating. While inspecting the premises, they discover the stolen gadget is a laser gun and also find a tiny footprint. They soon receive an urgent message from Jerry: Sam, Clover, and Alex have been kidnapped, and it seems the gadget thief is also their kidnapper! What's more, the thief appears to be a giant. After investigating, the Spiez discover the gadget thief is Davey Hacker, who escaped from WOOHP's prison. He's the one who stole the laser gun and kidnapped Sam, Alex, and Clover, and he also used the laser gun to transform into a giant. Why? To get revenge on WOOHP for not recruiting him as an agent! And soon, he kidnaps Megan! Marc, Tony, and Lee must rescue their sister and stop the giant. In the B-story, Megan falls in love with a new boy at school who is taller than her, and she wants to become as tall as him so he will notice her. Villain: Davey Hacker (2) Note: This episode is very similar to the "Attack of 50 Ft. Mandy" from Totally Spies!
23	23	"Operation Twins of Trouble: Parts 1, 2 and 3 (French: Mission : Jumeaux du chaos, parties 1, 2 et 3)"	822	19 February 2010	122
24	24	"Operation Twins of Trouble: Parts 1, 2 and 3 (French: Mission : Jumeaux du chaos, parties 1, 2 et 3)"	822	19 February 2010	123
25	25	"Operation Twins of Trouble: Parts 1, 2 and 3 (French: Mission : Jumeaux du chaos, parties 1, 2 et 3)"	822	19 February 2010	124
1/3: One day, the Clark children's parents are suddenly attacked! But surprisingly, Cal and Karen manage to defeat the attackers with such skill. Later at WOOHP, Jerry informs the Spiez of a strange event: a space module has crashed to Earth's surface. As the Spiez investigate, they capture a man who had been watching them from a distance and bring him to WOOHP. When they manage to get him to talk using a tickling device, they discover that the man's name is Larry. He explains that he used to run a former spy agency called OOPSIE and that the space module is a containment cell. Alpha, OOPSIE's archenemy, was imprisoned there, but he managed to escape. Very suspicious of Larry, Jerry sends the Spiez to follow him. As they follow Larry, they discover they are being led to a second space module and confront Larry for not telling them about it. But before they can do anything, they are attacked by Alpha and his twin brother, Omega! The Spiez try to defeat the twins in combat, but Marc and Megan are captured, and to Lee and Tony's great dismay and sadness, they are unable to save their brother and sister. In the B-story, Tami, after being rescued from an incident by the Clarks, wants to be friends with them! 2/3: Larry admits to Jerry that his agency created Alpha and Omega in a lab, hoping to create a new generation of spies. But the experiment went wrong, and as a result, Alpha and Omega earned the nickname "the Chaos Twins." Later, Lee and Tony go to rescue Marc and Megan and end up in Alpha and Omega's evil lair. There, they find Marc and Megan and free them, but after an unequal fight against the Chaos Twins, Lee and Tony are captured! Back at WOOHP, Marc and Megan tell Jerry and Larry the news. Larry suggests they call on the former spies who defeated the twins. To their surprise, Marc and Megan discover that these former spies are their parents! Once the new team is assembled, they set out to rescue Lee and Tony. But Alpha and Omega's plan works perfectly: they use the Spiez as bait to lure Cal and Karen, since they are the former spies who defeated them. As a result, the Spiez are then sent into space. 3/3: The Spiez manage to return to Earth, thanks to an idea suggested by Marc. But when they arrive, it's too late: the Chaos Twins have put Cal and Karen in an evil cloning lab. Why? To carry out their original plan, developed years ago: to create an army of clones to devastate the planet and become the new faces of evil. Using gadgets given to them by Jerry and Larry, the Spiez manage to defeat the twins by doing what their parents did to defeat them years ago: turning the clones against their creators. Jerry is soon able to erase Karen and Cal's memories, and the Spiez can return to their life of secret espionage. Now, they really have to keep it a secret. In the B-story, Tami remains friendly toward the Clarks, but in the end, after saving them from an accident in the cafeteria, she no longer feels obligated to be their friend. It's a relief for the Clarks to know that Tami won't be there to bother them anymore. Villain: The Chaos Twins (Alpha and Omega)
26	26	"Operation Yo-Yo Ninja Master (French: Mission : Yo-yo ninja star)"	726	26 February 2010	126
Slick Mick is such a fast and slippery villain that he's hard to catch! So Jerry sends the Spiez to arrest him and send him to WOOHP Prison. Lee, Marc, and Megan are unable to stop Mick, but Tony manages to defeat him with his brilliant yo-yo gadget in front of a huge crowd. Tony's heroic act impresses everyone, and he quickly becomes famous. He's interviewed on television, adored by many young girls, and signs autographs. The experience goes to his head, making him too busy to stop Mick, who has once again escaped from WOOHP Prison! To get Tony to react quickly, Lee, Marc, and Megan disguise themselves as villains and stage an attack. Tony is defeated in this fake fight and humiliated in front of his audience, which causes him to lose his fame. He then confesses to his siblings that being a celebrity is too much for him to bear and that he'd rather be a spy. When the quartet is reformed, the Spiez manage to defeat Mick for good. In the B-story, Lee loses all confidence after his first humiliating defeat in a basketball game in front of the entire school. He then feels too nervous and under pressure to work as a spy, and he has to pull himself together. Villain: Slick Mick Note: This is supposedly where season 2 takes off. However, Mission No. 987 (Operation WOOCSI) and Mission No. 848 (Operation Cruisin' for a Bruisin') have higher mission numbers, indicating an error in sequencing since Operation WOOCSI and Operation Cruisin' for a Bruisin' were aired earlier.

=== Season 2 (2010–12) ===
No. overall	No. in season	Title	Mission done no.	Original release date	Prod. code
27	1	"Operation Rebel Robot (French: Mission : Robot techno)"	456	5 July 2010	141
An inmate named Techno Tommy escapes from WOOHP prison by stealing a truck. Jerry sends the Spiez to track him down and return him to custody, and they succeed. Meanwhile, the school Science Fair is approaching, and Marc is determined to beat Tami and win, so decides to build a robot. After an initial failure, Marc decides to "borrow" some technology from WOOHP. He finds a microchip and installs it in his robot, hoping it will help him win the science fair. However, he is unaware that the chip was confiscated from Techno Tommy, who created it to enable computers to rebel against their owners. The robot rebels and frees Tommy from the WOOHP prison, and chaos ensues! Jerry and the Spiez must track Tommy down in time to defeat him. In the B-story, Marc is determined to beat Tami and win the science fair trophy, but this leads him to cheat. Villain: Techno Tommy Note: This is the first time we see Marc's good and bad sides. The villain resembles the male version of Muffy Peprich.
28	2	"Operation Nano Spiez (French: Mission : Nano Spiez)"	428	6 July 2010	142
Jerry informs the Spiez about the disappearance of several WOOHP agents. While investigating, the Spiez discover a tiny boot and realize that the agents have shrunk to just one centimeter in height! As they continue their investigation, Lee and Megan are suddenly abducted and shrunk as well, and Marc and Tony later suffer the same fate! They eventually discover that Davey Hacker is behind it all. Hacker escaped from WOOHP prison using stolen technology and is trying to eliminate the Spiez, still seeking revenge on WOOHP for not recruiting him as an agent! This time, however, he uses his technology to shrink the Spiez to a tiny size, thinking it will be easy to eliminate him. Or so he thinks. In the B-story, Cal and Karen are away for the weekend, and the kids are staying home with Aunt Trudy! Villain: Davey Hacker (3) Note: Davey Hacker last appeared in Mission No. 556. This is another continuity error.
29	3	"Operation Evil Paparazzi (French: Mission : Paparazzi)"	467	7 July 2010	143
When the Clark siblings discover a newspaper article about "mysterious spies," they fear someone is trying to expose their identities! At WOOHP, they explain the situation to Jerry, who provides them with gadgets to avoid detection. Later, Jerry sends the Spiez to WOOHP prison, where a computer glitch is preventing the system from verifying that all inmates are still in their cells. Once the computer issue is resolved—thanks to Marc—they learn that ten inmates have escaped, and the tenth is Jerry's sister, Sherry! They soon discover that Sherry is the villain trying to expose them in the newspaper! When they break the news to Jerry, he tells them he has to put them on hiatus until he finds out what Sherry is up to. However, their hiatus is short-lived, as they soon discover that Jerry has been kidnapped! While searching for him, the Spiez find out that Sherry is behind it all. She has become an evil paparazzi and intends to expose Jerry and the Spiez to the entire world. Fortunately, the Spiez manage to defeat Sherry and rescue Jerry. In the B-story, Tami writes insulting and rude lies about Tony, Marc, and Megan in her new school newspaper column. However, she doesn't write any rude lies about Lee, because she has a crush on him. Villain: Sherry Lewis (2) Absent: Karen Note: Sherry first appeared in Mission No. 987. Another continuity error. This is the first episode to include "evil" in its episode title (just like several episodes of Totally Spies!).
30	4	"Operation Snowy Falcon (French: Mission : Snowboard)"	730	8 July 2010	145
A parking lot is attacked at that, coinciding with widespread heavy snow and ice. The next day, the Clark kids discover that Sibersmoothie's smoothie machine has been stolen! Jerry later sends the Spiez to investigate random patches of snow and ice appearing around the world. Upon arrival, the Spiez discover that the freezing conditions aren't limited to the outdoors, but there is ice inside buildings, too! They eventually learn that the culprit behind it all is none other than Stony Falcon, who has changed his name to Snowy Falcon. He stole the smoothie machine from Sibersmoothie and used it to craft a new snowboard! What's more, he plans to use the board to transform the entire world into an extreme snowy landscape! Although the Spiez find themselves trapped in a block of ice, they are determined to break free and defeat the snowboarder once and for all. In the B-story, Lee has a job at Sibersmoothie. His boss tasks him with creating his very own smoothie. Villain: Stony Falcon [Renamed 'Snowy' Falcon] (2)
31	5	"Operation Killer Condos (French: Mission : Appart d'enfer !)"	428	9 July 2010	146
The Clark parents announce to their children that they are moving into a new condo! Marc is thrilled to have his own room and no longer have to share with Tony, but his siblings are not at all happy about the idea. Jerry later informs the Spiez that several people have gone missing. When they arrive at the home of one of the victims, they find a clue: a business card featuring a shark. They send the card to Jerry, and upon analyzing it, he discovers it belongs to Sharky, a local real estate agent. He then sends the Spiez to Sharky's apartment. It is revealed that Sharky is behind the abductions. He has placed all the kidnapped victims in a large pool to be eaten by a large shark. Upon arriving at the scene, the Spiez learn that Sharky plans to attack their mother! Fortunately, they manage to defeat the agent and save their parents without revealing their identities. In the B-story, Jerry tries to find a new hairstyle that suits him. Villain: Sharky Note: The Totally Spies! return as cameos when the Spiez decided to use the hologram gadget, called the Dial-a-Spy Hologram Watch; disguising Marc as Sam, Tony as Clover, Lee as Alex and Megan as Jerry. This mission is numbered the same as "Operation Nano Spiez!", making a continuity error.
32	6	"Operation Yeti Bear (French: Mission : Drôle de yéti)"	532	12 July 2010	147
Several attacks have occurred at a winter sports resort. When Jerry learns of these attacms, he assigns the Spiez to investigate. Upon their arrival, people come under attack, but fortunately, the Spiez manage to save them from a terrible accident. They also discover a clue: a strand of hair. Jerry then informs them that their old enemy, Kat, appears to have vanished. They split into two teams: Tony and Lee head to WOOHP to analyze the hair sample, while Megan and Marc go to Kat's house. Analysis of the hair reveals that the attacks were the work of a yeti-like creature. Meanwhile, at Kat's place, Marc is struck by a strange substance and transforms into a hairy yeti! It turns out Kat is the culprit. She had paid Tress Locksley, a famous hairstylist, for the "coolest hair treatment," but the result was disastrous—Kat's hair is now absolutely hideous! Now, she plans to take revenge on Tress for doing this to her. In the B-story, a girl named Terra Prefontaine breaks all of Lee's school records, and he is determined to get them back. Villain: Kat (2)
33	7	"Operation Jolty Juice (French: Mission : Énergie)"	463	13 July 2010	144
To raise money for new uniforms, Lee's new basketball coach gives him and his teammates energy drinks to sell—specifically to adults. Meanwhile, Jerry sends the Spiez to investigate a WOOHP minibus that a prisoner has hijacked. Inside, they discover a clue: fake hands! Jerry later informs the Spiez that a series of attacks has occurred. Their investigation reveals that Mr. Pipette and Mrs. Shields are involved, behaving strangely like children. The same thing happens to Jerry and Cal, and it turns out the energy drink is the cause of this odd behavior: it contains a mysterious substance that alters human behavior. The Spiez eventually discover that Lee's new basketball coach is actually Mel, their former evil babysitter, in disguise, meaning he is behind it all! He is the one who escaped from the minibus, and he plans to use his drinks on other adults to make them act like children, thereby becoming the only adult left on Earth. The team must stop Mel before the situation spirals out of control. In the B-story, Jerry gives Megan a new experimental spy suit, but she struggles a bit to use it. Villain: Mel (2) Note: Also, Mel first appeared in Mission No. 593. Another continuity error.
34	8	"Operation Gus-Jitsu (French: Mission : Ninja)"	734	14 July 2010	148
Jerry sends the Spiez to Tokyo, where a unique pair of slippers has been stolen. The Spiez head to the Museum of Natural History to track them down but are suddenly attacked by an incredibly agile individual. Later, at WOOHP, Jerry trains the Spiez in the art of WOOHP-jitsu after discovering that the criminal is a ninja. That night, in the jungle, the Spiez are attacked and locked in cages. They eventually discover that it was the ninja who attacked them, and it is none other than Gus Jr.! It turns out he stole ancient artifacts from Tokyo to gain incredibly powerful and unique ninja abilities, making him faster and more agile than ever. Fortunately, the Spiez manage to escape their cages and defeat Gus using their own ninja skills. In the B-story, a new omniscient computer robot, Virtual Virgil, replaces Marc as the school's homework assistant, threatening his status as Southdale's genius. Marc is jealous of Virgil and wants to prove that he is much smarter. Villain: Gus Jr. (2)
35	9	"Operation Forgotten Island (French: Mission : Île... déserte ?)"	699	15 July 2010	149
After completing a mission, the Spiez head home aboard the WOOHP jet. Suddenly, they receive a coded distress call from WOOHP. The plane goes out of control and crashes on a deserted island. Although the Spiez are unharmed, the jet is damaged, and they are unable to contact Jerry. They decide to explore the island. During their investigation, they discover the numbers "123" marked everywhere, manage to escape an erupting volcano, and find footprints. They eventually discover that WOOHP 123, the very first WOOHP supercomputer, has been reactivated. Furious at Jerry for abandoning her, she plans to use the Spiez as bait to lure Jerry to the island and destroy him. When Jerry receives a distress call from the Spiez, he rushes to the island, and he and the Spiez soon find themselves under attack by WOOHP 123. Fortunately, Jerry and the Spiez manage to shut down the computer using a gadget that allows them to take on the appearance of another person. In the B-story, Tony hits his head during the crash. This causes him to believe he is a comic book superhero: Broccoli Boy. Villain: WOOHP 123 Note: As of this episode, all of the episodes of "The Amazing Spiez!" would be drawn and animated with Adobe Animate, also some characters are different.
36	10	"Operation Tami Trouble (French: Mission : Rockstar)"	236	16 July 2010	150
During a school field trip to the museum, Tami finds a beautiful space rock. She secretly takes the rock, thinking she can turn it into a necklace and assuming no one will notice it is missing. Meanwhile, Jerry summons the Spiez to investigate a top-secret military facility in Antarctica where technology has been stolen. Upon arrival, they discover the stolen technology is linked to mind control. They also find their first clue: a guitar pick. The next day at school, Tami is meaner than ever to the Clarks, even going as far as to kidnap them, driven by the stolen space rock that has placed her under mind control. The Spiez eventually discover that Sebastian, an evil rockstar who has previously clashed with Alex, Clover, and Sam, has been manipulating Tami into doing his evil bidding using the mind-controlling space rock. Furthermore, he plans to place the Spiez under his mind control so they will help him get revenge by taking over WOOHP! In the B-story, Tony has terrible grades and is grounded for a month. This makes him unable to go on the mission. Villain: Sebastian Note: This villain also appeared in the first two seasons of Totally Spies! Also, this episode is the first time we see all the Clark siblings as evil. Note 2: This is the last episode to air on Cartoon Network.
37	11	"Operation Senior Spy (French: Mission : Mamie espion)"	233	19 July 2010	151
When Jerry announces to the Spiez that the Granny has been recruited to their team, they are in shock! He reassures them that she has been rehabilitated and is "no longer dangerous," but they are still not sure. For their first mission together, they must keep an eye on Victoria Brathwaite, who has recently been on parole. Upon arriving at her laboratory, they discover she has been busy with her usual bizarre research. This time, however, she is attempting to fuse her genes with those of a young woman! Later, Jerry informs the Spiez that a massive gold reserve has been stolen from a bank. Suspecting that Granny might be the thief, the Spiez head to the bank to investigate. They soon discover that Brathwaite has manipulated the Granny's DNA to make her appear much younger, and they decide to rob the central bank. Fortunately, the Spiez are able to stop them both. In the B-story, Lee must have Tami as his tutor after failing his French test, much to his horror and dismay. Villain: Dr. Brathwaite (2) and the Granny (2).
38	12	"Operation Astronauts (French: Mission : Piège de l'espace)"	938	20 July 2010	152
As the Spiez return from a mission in the desert in the WOOHP van, all four tires suddenly blow out and the van skids out of control, leaving the team stranded. Fortunately, they are uninjured. However, they are suddenly attacked. They soon discover that the culprit is Arnold, an astronaut who crashed in the desert after being lost in space for three years. Upon seeing their gadgets and spy gear, he believes he is on an alien planet! He captures Tony, Lee, and Megan and takes them to his makeshift camp, planning to dismantle the team's van and use the parts to escape the planet. Fortunately, Marc manages to rescue his siblings, and they bring Arnold back to his senses. In the B-story, Megan is convinced she saw a UFO in the sky and tries to convinced her brothers that aliens really exist. Villain: Arnold Vice, an Austrian astronaut.
39	13	"Operation Solo Spy (French: Mission : Espion en solo)"	779	21 July 2010	103
During a mission in the sewers, Lee, Tony, and Marc defeat a villain without letting Megan help. Back at WOOHP, Jerry congratulates the three boys and announces that they are in the running for the title of Spy of the Month, leaving Megan out. Wanting to prove to her brothers that she is just as good as they are, she decides to hack the WOOHP computer to find a mission she can complete on her own. Megan soon finds herself going after Maurice, a weakling who has stolen the strength of the most muscular and athletic celebrities in order to transfer it to himself and become a villain: Macho Man! Megan attempts to rescue the celebrities but is captured and unable to escape. She then realizes she must call her brothers to come and help her. When the boys arrive, Megan explains why she undertook the mission alone. The boys realize how they had treated her and apologize, and the four siblings reconcile. Thanks to Megan (and a little help from her brothers), they manage to defeat Macho-man, and as a result, Megan wins the title of Spy of the Month. In the B-story, the boys go camping with Cal. Villain: Macho Man (Maurice)
40	14	"Operation Trudy on Duty (French: Mission : Anti-espion)"	640	22 July 2010	104
One evening, the Spiez are tasked with delivering a package of WOOHP gear to Jerry, but they are tired and decide to deliver it the next day, so they head home to sleep. Later, at the Clark household, Aunt Trudy is exposed to a dangerous serum inside a vial, and the next day, her behavior becomes very strange. Later, the Spiez deliver the gear to WOOHP as requested. But while they are on their way to school, Marc is suddenly kidnapped by an extremely skilled anti-spy! However, the remaining Spiez discover a few clues: a piece of red thread and some cooking oil. They then learn from Jerry that someone has hacked into the WOOHP computer and downloaded all kinds of top-secret information. The Spiez set out to investigate, but they are mysteriously kidnapped one by one by the same anti-spy! They are tied up and eventually discover that the kidnapper was Aunt Trudy all along! The serum she was exposed to turned her into an assassin tasked with eliminating spies, and she now plans to eliminate her niece and nephews. The Spiez must defeat their evil aunt and restore her to her normal, harmless self. In the B-story, Marc gets his hands on a miniature WOOHP pyramid that he believes can predict the future. Villain: Aunt Trudy
41	15	"Operation Super Spy Flakes (French: Mission : Céréales d'enfer)"	775	23 July 2010	107
When Jerry informs our Spiez that a robotics lab has been burglarized, they investigate and discover that the lab's nanochips are missing. During their investigation, they find a clue: a residue on the floor. Shortly after the residue has been sent to Jerry for analysis, Tony finds a special gold spy ring in a box of Super Spy Flakes and wins a tour of the factory led by its owner, Flaky Fructose. However, shortly after arriving at the factory with the other winners, they fall under Flaky's control due to the nanochips in their rings. It turns out that Flaky stole the nanochips and is using them for mind control. Meanwhile, Lee, Marc, and Megan learn from Jerry that the residue they sent him matches the ingredients used to make Super Spy Flakes. They quickly head to the factory, where they discover that Tony and the other winners have been recruited by Flaky to help him take revenge on his biggest rival: cereal manufacturers who tried to copy his cereal! In the B-story, Jerry attempts to create various spy-themed products to raise money for the agency. Villain: Flaky Fructose
42	16	"Operation Spy Clone (French: Mission : WOOHP en danger)"	142	26 July 2010	101
One night at WOOHP, Jerry attempts to clone himself, but the experiment goes wrong. The next day, he announces to the Spiez that he is retiring from WOOHP! However, he also reveals that his younger clone, Jerry 2.0, will be the new boss of WOOHP in his absence. Ror their first mission, they split info two teams: Lee and Marc must stop the Termitenator, while Tony and Megan have to battle a rogue machine in the WOOHP lab. Although the Spiez run into trouble with their gadgets, they manage to complete their missions. Later, back at WOOHP, the Spiez discover a strange, clone-like substance. They eventually learn that Jerry 2.0 wants the power and prestige that WOOHP offers, but he has no actual interest in running an agency. Why? Because he doesn't like that the team takes everything seriously. In fact, he wants to get rid of them for good with clones of them that are "more fun." Fortunately for the Spiez, they manage to defeat the evil clones, and the real Jerry decides to come out of retirement. In the B-story, Tony wants to be more accepted by his siblings, so he decides to imitate them. Villain: Jerry 2.0
43	17	"Operation Funny Bone (French: Mission : Comique d'enfer)"	443	27 July 2010	108
Jerry informs the Spiez that Hannigan, a comedian known for smashing vegetables with a mallet, has gone missing. They set out to find him, only to discover that he isn't actually missing. However, he seems to have lost his mojo and can no longer entertain the way he used to. The Spiez then learn from Jerry that a famous clown named Bizbo is being kidnapped. Although they fail to stop the abduction in time, they find a clue: a piece of red rubber. They discover that the rubber comes from a clown nose belonging to Funny Bone, revealing that he is behind it all. Bitter over his lack of popularity as a comedian and realizing other clowns were far funnier than him, he devised a plan to steal their sense of humor. Once his plan succeeds, he intends to put on a successful show for an unsuspecting audience of people who had previously rejected him so he can use his newfound humor on them to make them laugh like crazy! In the B-story, Megan decides to participate in a school talent show to impress the basketball team captain. Villain: Funny Bone
44	18	"Operation Sudstastic (French: Mission : Nettoyage)"	944	28 July 2010	106
Eco-activists around the world are mysteriously developing bizarre symptoms. When WOOHP learns of this strange situation, Jerry sends the Spiez to uncover the cause of the activists' condition. During their investigation, the Spiez discover odd details about the affected activists, as well as pinecones and ropes coated in a hard, shiny substance. Furthermore, the activists themselves are covered in this same substance, and they all share a common link: having protested against a car wash chain! It turns out the car wash is called Sudstastic, and the owner has converted one of his locations into an experimental lab, exposing the protesters to this strange substance. The Spiez step in to stop the villain upon arriving at the car wash and, in a soapy battle, they must defeat the owner and his crazy washing machine. In the B-story, Megan reduces her family's carbon footprint. Villain: Sudstastic
45	19	"Operation Scary Jerry, Part 1 (French: Mission : Amnésie, partie 1)"	237	29 July 2010	110
When Jerry tells the Spiez he is heading to a peace conference, he tasks them with looking after WOOHP. However, before reaching the conference, Jerry has an accident and wakes up in the hospital with amnesia. Meanwhile, while the Spiez are guarding WOOHP, Tony unknowingly releases Sherry, Jerry's sister, from prison. Sherry had been slated for transfer to a more secure area of the facility following violent altercations with other inmates. She soon receives a call from the hospital asking her to pick up her brother. Once Jerry is in her care, she convinces him that they are a spy team on a mission to free their brother, Terence, from a high-security prison located on a desolate island owned by WOOHP. Meanwhile, the SpieZ receive an alert from the island. They investigate and discover that not only is Jerry involved, but Sherry and Terence are with him, and he is under their influence! The Spiez attempt to stop them, but they are captured and left trapped in the middle of the frozen island, and Jerry, Sherry, and Terence make their escape. In the B-story, Tami stays with the Clarks while her parents are away. Villain: Sherry (3) Terrence (1) Jerry (bumped his memory and forgot who he is) Note: This is Part 1 of a two-part episode.
46	20	"Operation Scary Jerry, Part 2 (French: Mission : Amnésie, partie 2)"	346	30 July 2010	111
The Spiez are still trapped on the desolate island, but they manage to escape their predicament. Once they have recovered from their ordeal, they realize their mission is only just beginning. They must not only free Jerry from the influence of his siblings, but also uncover their intentions and stop them. Meanwhile, back at WOOHP, Jerry, Sherry, and Terence are hatching an evil plan for world domination. They intend to attack the Spy Conference and brainwash the organization's members. Jerry designs a gadget to carry out this scheme. When the Spiez arrive at WOOHP to find Jerry and his siblings, they discover that Tami has also stumbled upon the headquarters, and soon, under the influence of Jerry's gadget, Tami is brainwashed and turns into a full-blown villain! Later, Jerry, Sherry, and Terence arrive at the spy conference and, as planned, manipulate the organization's members. The Spiez find themselves facing Jerry, his siblings, and the brainwashed conference attendees. To make matters worse, Tami returns, more powerful than ever! But luckily for the Spiez, however, they manage to deal with Tami, defeat Sherry and Terence once and for all, and rescue Jerry! Villain: Sherry (3) Terrence (1) Jerry (bumped his memory and forgot who he is) Note: This is Part 2 of a two-part episode.
47	21	"Operation Chicken Suit (French: Mission : Super mascotte)"	112	22 May 2012	112
Jerry informs the Spiez about the disappearance of Paco, a famous chihuahua who is the face of a global taco chain. When they arrive at the chain's location (where he was last seen), they find a clue: strange claw marks on the ceiling. Jerry then sends them to protect another famous animal: a pig named Bacon. However, upon investigating Bacon's home, they discover the pig has already been abducted. Despite this, the Spiez find another clue: a yellow feather. They eventually discover that Clucky, actor who wore a chicken costume as the mascot of Kooky Farms 30 years, is behind the kidnappings. Having been replaced by a real chicken as the farm's mascot, he decided to attack the farm to regain his celebrity status. His plan involves controlling the animals with evil collars around their necks so they will help him attack Kooky Farms and get revenge! In the B-story, Tony is convinced he is allergic to Marc and takes drastic measures to stay away from him. Villain: Clucky
48	22	"Operation No Pal in Principal (French: Mission : Alerte au collège)"	248	23 May 2012	109
One night, a mysterious space orb lands in the desert. The next day, Jerry is informed of the situation and sends the Spiez to the desert to search for the object. When they find the orb, they bring it back to school. But suddenly, the entire building locked down. The orb is deployed and creates an evil version of Principal Shields that attempts to turn all the students into zombies! Lee and Tony are shielded from the evil rays, but Marc and Megan are affected and transform into zombies. Meanwhile, Cal, having given a Career Day speech at a school assembly, is still inside the locked-down school after chatting with Principal Shields, and he doesn't notice anything at all! Lee and Tony must defeat the evil principal, save Marc, Megan, and the school, and prevent their father from discovering their secret about being spies. In the B-story, it is Career Day at school, and everyone has to write a 500-word essay on their future goals, but Tony is struggling to figure out what he wants to do. Villain: An orb from space
49	23	"Operation Noel's Last Stand (French: Mission : Noël contre-attaque)"	323	24 May 2012	105
Marc hears about a contest organized by Noel Industries to design a spacesuit, so he decides to enter to take on the challenge. Soon, with the help of the WOOHP engineering department, he creates a suit packed with features and capabilities, winning the competition hands down. However, what Marc doesn't know is that Mr. Noel is actually Chameleon Leon in disguise. He tricked Marc into creating the spacesuit to restore his chameleon powers, which he had lost after his last run-in with WOOHP. Using the suit, he captures Marc and plans to use him as bait to steal a massive shipment of gold from a train. As a result, Lee, Megan, and Tony must rescue their brother and stop the Chameleon once and for all. In the B-story, Tony and Tami are forced to wear a two-person mascot costume to learn how to share after fighting over dessert at lunch. Villain: Chameleon Leon (3)
50	24	"Operation Sneak Attack (French: Mission : Attaque surprise)"	50	24 May 2012	119
One night at WOOHP, Jerry is in the secret files room. He picks up a file on the Spiez and decides it is finally time to eliminate them by launching a sneak attack. The next day, the Spiez find themselves at WOOHP, only to find that to their surprise and confusion, no one is there! Wondering where Jerry is, they stock up on gadgets and set out to find their boss. As they search the building, they encounter some bizarre occurrences: there isn't a single employee around, fire alarms and extinguishers are going off inexplicably, and they are attacked by the martial arts training robot! They soon discover a file titled "Mission: Sneak Attack" and realize they are the targets! Meanwhile, Jerry is in a meeting with Alex, Sam, Clover, and the WOOHP security guards, discussing their plan to take down the Spiez. In the end, the Spiez discover what is really going on: Jerry had set up all these obstacles to stage a party for his team in honor of their 50th mission! Note 1: Sam, Clover and Alex appear in this episode as well but have no lines. Note 2: The mission number in this episode is number 50, which is another continuity error.
51	25	"Operation Sassy Lasse (French: Mission : Poupée d'enfer)"	251	25 May 2012	114
Tami arrives at school carrying a strange Tami doll. She reveals that she won the "Sassy Lasse" contest, making her the face of the brand. The Spiez are then sent on a mission and split into two teams: Marc and Tony head to a Russian factory to track down a stolen microchip, while Megan and Lee investigate the home of a girl who was attacked. While comparing notes and investigating, the Spiez find a clue: a paint chip. Later at school, a Tami doll mysteriously comes to life and attacks Megan! Upon analyzing the doll, the Spiez discover a chip inside that matches the one stolen from the factory! They eventually realize that the Tami dolls are attacking their owners and that Kat is behind it all. It turns out she had come in second place in the Sassy Lasse contest and wanted to be the model herself, so she figured that if she could make the Tami dolls rebel against everyone, she would end up with dolls modeled after her instead. Unfortunately, the dolls are now out of control. It is up to the Spiez to eliminate the threat. In the B-story, Jerry, stressed with his work, takes up yoga to relax. Villain: Kat (3)
52	26	"Operation Shrubbery (French: Mission : Buisson fou)"	952	25 May 2012	153
When Jerry hears about a series of bizarre attacks on people who seemingly have nothing in common, he tasks the Spiez with investigating. Upon reviewing the details, the Spiez discover that the victims were all working on a project to turn their beloved park into an office building. They also find a clue: a strange thorn. During the investigation, Lee and Tony are suddenly abducted and trapped in the crane of a large excavator. While searching for their brothers, Marc and Megan discover that the attacks are being carried out by plant figures created and genetically modified by a disgruntled gardener named Chauncy. Thanks to scientific processes, Chauncy's plants have come to life and are attacking the office building to stop the developers from completing their project. Megan and Marc must rescue Lee and Tony, stop the plants, and save the park. In the B-story, Megan and Tami have a crush on the same boy at school and go to great lengths to try to catch his attention. Villain: Chauncy and his plants
