= List of Radio Free Roscoe episodes =

The following is an episode list for the Canadian teen comedy-drama Radio Free Roscoe. The series consists of 52 episodes. In Canada, the series originally aired on Family Channel as two seasons of 26 episodes each. In the United States, the series aired on The N as four seasons of 13 episodes each.

== Episodes ==
=== Season 1 (Canadian) / Seasons 1–2 (U.S.) ===
#	Episode title	Summary
1	The Power of Radio	The members of the gang, who are just starting at Roscoe High, are introduced: Lily, a musician, Travis, a slightly odd but charming outcast, Ray, a class clown, and Robbie, an independent guy who stands up for his beliefs. Lily has written a song, but she doesn't know if she can stand up in front of a crowd to perform it. Ray tries out for the school play instead of soccer, and is worried about his father's reaction. Robbie and Travis both join Cougar Radio, but Travis soon finds that it's not "the voice of Roscoe High" and quits. Robbie soon does as well. They both have ideas for their own radio show, and they pull Lily and Ray along for the ride.
2	On the Air	Lily, Ray, Robbie and Travis have marked their territory as Radio Free Roscoe. They have done a few shows, but just because something is on the radio, does it have true meaning? The gang will soon find out. When Travis puts them on-air without their knowledge, they will find that the true meaning of radio might not be what everyone thinks it is.
3	About a Girl	Lily starts attracting attention because she is hanging out with one of the most popular girls in school. She has been wearing dresses and flirting with cute guys. Ray seems to care greatly, with hidden meaning. When he tries to sabotage Lily's date with Lee Johns, Robbie and Travis are almost positive that Ray has stronger feelings about Lily than they thought.
4	Radio Wars	When RFR is called lame by rival Kim Carlisle of Cougar Radio, it creates a predicament. As RFR retaliates with an imitation of Kim, this causes many other things. It brings out the name calling, the dirty tricks, Ray's sexuality and the lies. Kim does the unthinkable: she frames RFR for vandalism. The gang has to decide what's best for Radio Free Roscoe.
5	Clark Kent	When Robbie's crush falls in love with his alter ego Question Mark, he has decisions to make. If he reveals his alter ego to her, his Radio Free Roscoe future might go down the drain.
6	I Am Question Mark	Has RFR pulled their last prank? When they air an embarrassing tape of Principal Waller as a teenager, Principal Waller makes it his personal goal to figure out who Question Mark is. Meanwhile, Lily tries to get Waller to change his mind about his ban on headphones.
7	Political in Pink	Lily expresses her ideas for the school in an assembly. After that, everyone is raving for her to run for class president. When someone brings to her attention that she has never done anything to prove her responsibilities for the school, she realizes she needs to make some changes in her campaign. But this causes her to lose sight of everything she was fighting for in the first place.
8	The Imposter	Someone is posing as Smog. Will RFR have to reveal their secret identities to clear Smog's reputation? Travis is forced to prove his talents of the real Smog at an RFR warehouse party. Also, will Ray and Robbie be able to find dates to the warehouse party?
9	Detention Redemption	The whole Radio Free Roscoe group is thrown into after school detention. A problem arises that there will be nobody to cover for the gang. If no one is broadcasting at the station, Mr. Waller will suspect that they're the ones behind Radio Free Roscoe.
10	Crush Me	When Lily's crush on her guitar teacher doesn't go the way she had hoped it to, she needs to find a way to relieve her depression that doesn't affect RFR.
11	My Pal Pronto	The gang at RFR make a new radio show based on Ray's ongoing conflict with his father, which causes Ray to become a boarder in his own house. Will Ray enjoy his newfound freedom or will he give in to his father?
12	Call of the Cougar	Ray and Travis both have opposing views of school spirit. The school team argues with Travis about him being "weird" and Travis almost hurts one of the players. Mr. Waller tells the player to not do anything and for Travis to "get in the spirit of things". Ray agrees to steal the mascot for the school team to prove his loyalty.
13	Sports Ray-dio	Ray leaves RFR for rival station Cougar Radio, and discovers the price of fame, and subsequently, the freedom of anonymity.
14	Count on Me	After breaking Lily's amp, Travis and Robbie need to find a way to replace it. Robbie takes a job at Mickey's taking inventory, and it gets worse: his partner is Kim Carlisle; but Robbie finds out that she isn't as bad as he had thought. In an effort to make his money, Travis creates an on-air auction, selling a bunch of "antiques" to the RFR listeners.
15	Girl Talk Radio	Travis fills in for Lily at the station as a girl named "Miss Communication," and turns out to be a real crowd pleaser. Will Roscoe ever hear from Smog again? Meanwhile, with the help of Robbie, Ed and Ted are looking to dazzle the crowd at Mickey's with their new boy band, NTropy.
16	Pig Marion	In an effort to win Lily's affection, Ray challenges her to turn him into the perfect boyfriend. Lily reveals that he may be her perfect boyfriend. Also, in return for new equipment, RFR is forced to do advertisements for Radio Hut.
17	Written in the Stars	Travis and Audrey bond over their search for extraterrestrial life, which inspires Travis to create a radio serial that reflects his feelings for her.
18	How to Lose a Girl	Ray enlists Lily's radio show advice to help him get his obnoxious girlfriend to break up with him. When it doesn't work, they finally have to succumb to more drastic measures that bring Ray and Lily much closer. Also, Lily is jealous of Ray's girlfriend.
19	This Just In	Principal Waller goes a little crazy after starting his "Happy People, Happy Planet" campaign. It's up to the gang at RFR to restore everything at Henry Roscoe High to normal. Meanwhile, Lily enlists the help of physics geniuses, Ed and Ted, to help her pass her test.
20	Gossip	Rumors are flying when RFR reveals Principal Waller's crush on the English teacher. Will Waller's revenge possibly mean the end of RFR?
21	Zen and the Art of Bicycle Maintenance	After Robbie's bike is stolen, Ray will stop at nothing to catch the thief. Meanwhile, it's Travis's birthday, and Lily's going to help him celebrate, whether he wants to or not.
22	The Boxer	Principal Waller is the substitute teacher for Ray and Travis' history class, and Travis intends to embarrass Waller's lack of history knowledge about the Boxer Rebellion. In an effort to help Kim, Robbie comes up with a new way to sell the unpopular Cougar Calendars.
23	The Bad Boy	Robbie is dismayed when Principal Waller assigns him to star in a video based on "the day in the life of a model student". How can Robbie be perceived as such a goody-goody when his alter ego is Question Mark? Robbie tries to change his reputation when he realizes that his partner on the project is an attractive, artsy and rebellious media student by the name of Sydney. Ray finds and then loses his lucky charm and goes on a bad luck streak.
24	More Than a Single	Travis convinces Lily to let him produce one of her songs. Travis is really tough but Lily realizes that he is bringing out the best of her musical talents. The song is an instant hit in Roscoe but Lily freaks out when he airs and releases the single under her own name as opposed to Shady Lane. Robbie and Kim realize they have great chemistry when they debate issues against each other on Cougar Radio.
25	The Awful Truth	Romance and relationships are abuzz at Henry Roscoe High. Lily tries desperately to talk to Travis about their "moment" together, but Travis isn't opening up, and the tension between Lily, Travis and Audrey is getting really thick. In the meantime Ray is trying to make up to Travis and Lily and continually apologizes for accusing them of secretly dating. Everything blows up on the air in a truth-telling session like never heard before.
26	All or Nothing	The gang is reeling from secrets, betrayal, love and hurt feelings. Nobody but Question Mark wants to be at Radio Free Roscoe anymore. Like a lone wolf, Question Mark continues on his own trying to keep things together and hoping that everything will go back to way it was before it all fell apart. As RFR falls apart on the air, Principal Waller and Kim Carlisle come up with a plan that will take down Radio Free Roscoe once and for all.

=== Season 2 (Canadian) / Seasons 3–4 (U.S.) ===
#	Episode title	Summary
27	You Choose, You Lose	Lily accepts Ray's invitation to dinner but decides that romance won't be in the cards. Meanwhile, a rumour about Kim and a ninth grader threatens to destroy her run of Cougar Radio.
28	A Class, a Grade, a Lifetime	After burying the hatchet with Audrey, Lily reconsiders their friendship, while Ray and Travis dispute over the gentlemen's rules of pursuit.
29	One Steps Forward, Two Step Back	Ray and Travis both try to be Lily's number-one fan. Lily enters an open mic contest but fears she will do badly. Meanwhile, Kim and Question Mark (Robbie) continue fighting with one another. Guest appearance by The Meligrove Band.
30	These Bossy Boots Are Made for Walking	Robbie and Kim must work together on a dance but, much to their surprise, it's hard for them to decide on matters. Meanwhile, Lily tries to get an interview with The Pettit Project on RFR. Too bad Ray hogs the whole interview.
31	Scheming and Dreaming	Robbie becomes disillusioned with River's mentoring and Travis uses dream analysis to convince Lily he's the man in her dreams.
32	Lie vs. Lie	Ray is upset with Lily, when he realizes she's been lying to him. Robbie and Travis create their own web, as they try to keep the dynamic of RFR intact.
33	Bridget Over Troubled Water	The new girl in school is from Travis' mysterious past, which leaves Ray looking for answers. Lily and Robbie are concerned that their friendship isn't what it used to be.
34	I'm with Cupid	Is Lily jealous of Bridget? Has Lily finally picked between the lifelong compadre Ray or the enigmatic Travis? All will be revealed when Lily has a little chat with Bridget about the relationship she and Travis have.
35	You've Got E-Mail	Ray is yet again attempting to win over Lily's heart. Will he win it over? Or will his heart end up being crushed? Meanwhile, Travis is writing an email to Bridget.
36	River Deep, Roscoe High	With failing ratings, it may be the end of Cougar Radio and Kim's radio career... especially when Principal Waller puts hot guy River Pierce into the DJ seat. Meanwhile, Lily's become Ray and Travis' love shrink, making her feel completely left out of their lives.
37	Lil' and Grace	Ray and Lily decide to set each other up with someone who will be perfect for the other, or could they be talking about each other? Meanwhile, Robbie is jealous of Travis's worldly experience.
38	Daddy Dearest	Kim invites Robbie to dinner to meet her dad and at the dinner, River Pierce shows up. Lily is having trouble finding inspiration to write a song for the band's performance and when she does she accidentally remakes a band's old song.
39	There Will Be No Encore Tonight	Lily makes another attempt to express her feelings to Ray, Travis attempts to express his feelings to Bridget and Kim attempts to reveal her relationship with Robbie to the world.
40	Unbreak My Heart	While Ray discovers that finding love is sometimes as easy as asking for it, Lily, Travis and Robbie each come to terms with their aching hearts.
41	We'll Always Have Roscoe	Robbie comes to the harsh realization that sometimes love means letting go, while Travis and Lily come to discover that letting go is the only way to maintain their friendship.
42	Musical Influences	Lily falls for a tortured musician named Jackson (played by Jake Epstein). Jackson turns Lily into a clone of himself. Lily continues to put Jackson as first priority until No Man's Land breaks up. Meanwhile, Ray tells Grace that he can draw. His lie backfires when Grace asks him to illustrate a comic book for an English assignment.
43	Rah, Rah Revenge	After the Roscoe cheerleaders insult Lily and Parker, they team up with Travis to write a scathing song.
44	On a Wingman and a Prayer	While Robbie fights Lily's debut on Cougar Radio with the ever slippery River Pierce, Ray uses Travis' worldly background to secure his flailing social status.
45	The All-Nighter	Parker and Travis camp out while waiting in line for Trews tickets. Ray, Robbie, and Lily discover stuff from old sleepovers.
46	In the Key of F	Lily gets an "F" on her songwriting project, while Robbie gets a "B", the opposite of what they were both expecting. Ray starts working at Mickey's to earn cash to spend on his girlfriend, Grace. Meanwhile, Travis and Parker go paintballing.
47	Stand Up and Deliver	While Ray discovers that there is such a thing as going too far when he slams his brother on stage for years of teasing, Lily gets jealous over Parker's new-found talent: songwriting.
48	In Charm's Way	While Ray comes to the shocking realization that River Pierce has been using him to woo Lily, Robbie loses all his senses when he falls head-over-heels for The Oracle's hot editor, Blaire.
49	Truth or Conquests	Rumors run wild when River accidentally sleeps over at Lily's house and Ray catches them in the act, inadvertently spreading gossip.
50	The Trews About Rock & Roll	While No Man's Land rises to the top with a sweet gig opening for The Trews, Lily comes to realize that the truest friends are those that are around when you need them most.
51	Dance Around the Truth	Travis gets a call from Hong Kong and doesn't tell his friends what it was about, so they assume it was his ex-girlfriend. He acts like it was, and lets Parker believe that he is still in love with his ex because he thinks it will be easier on her if she hates him when he goes away, but eventually the truth comes out. He meets Parker and tells her there's only one girl he loves, her, but he's moving to Hong Kong.
52	The Last Dance	Everyone begins to plan their summer schedules, leaving the fate of their radio station uncertain.
