= List of Make It Pop episodes =

Make It Pop is a Canadian musical comedy television series created by Thomas W. Lynch and Nick Cannon that aired on Nickelodeon from March 26, 2015 to August 20, 2016. The series stars Megan Lee, Louriza Tronco, Erika Tham, and Dale Whibley.

All these episodes are connected.

== Series overview ==
Season	Episodes	Originally released	
Season	Episodes	First released	Last released
1	20	March 26, 2015	May 1, 2015
Special		December 5, 2015	
2	20	January 4, 2016	January 29, 2016
Special		August 20, 2016	

== Episodes ==
=== Season 1 (2015) ===
No. overall	No. in season	Title	Directed by	Written by	Original release date	Prod. code	U.S. viewers (millions)
1	1	"Rumors and Roommates"	Keith Samples	Thomas W. Lynch	March 26, 2015	101	1.29
2	2	"Duet"	Keith Samples	Thomas W. Lynch	April 7, 2015	102	1.31
3	3	"Failed Dreams"	Keith Samples	Thomas W. Lynch	April 8, 2015	103	1.47
4	4	"Stolen Moves"	Keith Samples	Skander Halim	April 9, 2015	104	1.64
5	5	"I Can't Hear Me"	Steve Wright	Thomas W. Lynch	April 10, 2015	105	1.41
6	6	"Popular"	Steve Wright	Skander Halim	April 13, 2015	106	1.09
7	7	"The Situation"	Steve Wright	Thomas W. Lynch	April 14, 2015	107	1.56
8	8	"The Campaign"	Steve Wright	Roger Fredricks	April 15, 2015	108	1.29
9	9	"I Am Genius"	Stefan Scaini	Jennifer Daley	April 16, 2015	109	1.37
10	10	"Homecoming"	Stefan Scaini	Skander Halim	April 17, 2015	110	1.43
11	11	"Mr. Chang"	Stefan Scaini	Teleplay by : Claire Ross Dunn; Story by : Rachael Schaefer	April 20, 2015	111	1.51
12	12	"Fashion Truck"	Stefan Scaini	Claire Ross Dunn	April 21, 2015	112	1.20
13	13	"Troll"	Keith Samples	Jennifer Daley	April 22, 2015	113	1.51
14	14	"The Tutor"	Keith Samples	Skander Halim	April 23, 2015	114	1.26
15	15	"Talent Show Redux"	Dawn Wilkinson	Thomas W. Lynch and Nick Cannon	April 24, 2015	115	1.25
16	16	"The Curse of Reality"	Dawn Wilkinson	Skander Halim	April 27, 2015	116	1.37
17	17	"Eggs"	Steve Wright	Jennifer Daley	April 28, 2015	117	1.36
18	18	"Love and Detention"	Mitchell T. Ness, CSC	Thomas W. Lynch	April 29, 2015	118	1.11
19	19	"Dreams"	Stefan Scaini	Thomas W. Lynch	April 30, 2015	119	1.35
20	20	"Heart, Courage, Brains"	Stefan Scaini	Thomas W. Lynch	May 1, 2015	120	1.30
Guest star: Nick Cannon

=== Special (2015) ===
No.	Title	Directed by	Written by	Original release date	Prod. code	U.S. viewers (millions)
21	"The Gift"	Steve Wright	Thomas W. Lynch	December 5, 2015	200	1.27

=== Season 2 (2016) ===
No. overall	No. in season	Title	Directed by	Written by	Original release date	Prod. code	U.S. viewers (millions)
22	1	"Think"	Steve Wright	Thomas W. Lynch	January 4, 2016	201	1.46
23	2	"Robomania"	Steve Wright	Thomas W. Lynch	January 5, 2016	202	1.33
24	3	"My Way or the Highway"	Steve Wright	Claire Ross Dunn	January 6, 2016	203	1.25
25	4	"Oh, Boys"	Steve Wright	Mark Purdy and Stuart Reid	January 7, 2016	204	1.18
26	5	"Potato Power"	RT!	Justin Varava	January 8, 2016	205	1.39
27	6	"The Mirror"	RT!	Thomas W. Lynch	January 11, 2016	206	1.15
28	7	"It's a Twin Thing"	Steve Wright	Claire Ross Dunn	January 12, 2016	207	1.32
29	8	"Fashion 911"	Steve Wright	Mark Purdy and Stuart Reid	January 13, 2016	208	1.27
30	9	"Spring Fling"	Warren P. Sonoda	Claire Ross Dunn	January 14, 2016	209	1.18
31	10	"Submission Impossible"	Dawn Wilkinson	Thomas W. Lynch	January 15, 2016	210	1.28
32	11	"Scuttlebutt"	Adam Weissman	Jon Davis	January 19, 2016	211	1.23
33	12	"Triangles"	Adam Weissman	Jennifer Daley	January 20, 2016	212	1.22
34	13	"Get on the Bus!"	Warren P. Sonoda	Claire Ross Dunn	January 21, 2016	213	1.35
35	14	"Reality Bites"	Dawn Wilkinson	Jennifer Daley	January 22, 2016	214	1.31
36	15	"Band Blast Off"	Steve Wright	Thomas W. Lynch	January 25, 2016	215	1.13
37	16	"Staged and Confused"	Steve Wright	Claire Ross Dunn	January 26, 2016	216	1.35
38	17	"Excess Baggage"	Warren P. Sonoda	Jon Davis	January 27, 2016	217	1.33
39	18	"Im-Prom-Tu"	Warren P. Sonoda	Claire Ross Dunn	January 28, 2016	218	1.40
40	19	"Looking for Trouble"	Steve Wright	Mark Purdy and Stuart Reid	January 29, 2016	219	1.07
41	20	"Really? It's Over?"	Steve Wright	Thomas W. Lynch	January 29, 2016	220	1.07
Note: Nickelodeon premiered these episodes as part of a double-length special episode, but they have subsequently been sold as separate 30-minute episodes.

=== Special (2016) ===
No.	Title	Directed by	Written by	Original release date	Prod. code	U.S. viewers (millions)
42	"Summer Splash"	John L'Ecuyer	Thomas W. Lynch	August 20, 2016	399	1.07
