= List of 100 Deeds for Eddie McDowd episodes =

The following is a list of episodes of 100 Deeds for Eddie McDowd, a television series that ran on Nickelodeon from October 16, 1999 to April 21, 2002.

== Series overview ==
Season	Episodes	Originally released	
Season	Episodes	First released	Last released
1	20	October 16, 1999	December 5, 2000
2	12	January 27, 2001	April 14, 2001
3	8	March 3, 2002	April 21, 2002

== Episodes ==
=== Season 1 (1999–2000) ===
No. overall	No. in season	Title	Directed by	Written by	Original release date	Prod. code
1	1	"Tagged"	Paul Hoen	Story by : Steven H. Berman & Mitchel Katlin & Nat Bernstein; Teleplay by : Steven H. Berman & Thomas W. Lynch	October 16, 1999	101
Eddie McDowd has been terrorizing his school and his town for many years, picking on kids he does not like. One day, having picked on a new kid, he meets a mysterious drifter who somehow knows about Eddie. As punishment he turns Eddie into a dog. The only way to ever get back to his human form is by performing 100 good deeds. The only one who can hear Eddie speak is the last kid he bullied.
2	2	"Dog Gone"	Paul Hoen	Thomas W. Lynch	October 23, 1999	105
When Eddie is left tied up in the back yard, he gets loose and retaliates by trashing the house, then he runs away back to his own house. Only, when he gets there he learns his parents are gone and won't be back until he does his 100 good deeds. He sets out to do those things, but can't seem to get them right. And he get a good deed in the end.
3	3	"Dog Day Out"	Gil Shilton	Brian Kahn	October 26, 1999	103
Though Eddie can't fool his master, he can fool his master's father. So well, in fact, that he takes Eddie to the doctor. Eddie then thinks he's found the love of his life. There's only one problem: She's a dog.
4	4	"All Howls Eve"	Paul Hoen	Andrew Gottlieb	October 29, 1999	106
After Eddie breaks an expensive bowl, Doug grounds Justin because he didn't tie up the dog before he went to school. This puts a damper on Eddie and Justin's Halloween plans. But Eddie convinces Justin to sneak out and pull some pranks that Eddie think are harmless. Meanwhile, Doug calls his wife, who's out of town on business, Mi begging her to help him.
5	5	"Slam Punk"	Sean Astin	Brian Kahn	November 13, 1999	109
Doug has his work cut out for him. His daughter asks him for a $150 watch. he tells her to get a job, which makes her very upset. Justin, meanwhile, has his heart set on making the basketball team. Unfortunately, his tormentors are on the team and do everything they can to keep him off the team. When Justin tells his father, he tries to give Justin fatherly advise. Instead, Justin decides to listen to the dog.
6	6	"Cheaters Sometimes Prosper"	Allison Liddi	Lance Whinery	November 20, 1999	108
7	7	"Mutts and Robbers"	Brian Roberts	Terry Maloney Haley & Mindy Morgenstern	December 18, 1999	104
Eddie mistakenly steals a bag of stolen money. Now Justin and Eddie must get the money to the authorities while proving who the robber is. Not an easy feat! Meanwhile, Gwen is sick and fights with her dad over control of the television.
8	8	"Dog Years"	Paul Hoen	Gloria Ketterer	December 31, 1999	113
9	9	"Puppy Love"	Gil Shilton	Barry Gurstein & David Pitlik	January 8, 2000	107
10	10	"The Students Are Revolting"	Christopher Coppola	Andrew Gottlieb	January 22, 2000	110
11	11	"False Hero"	Gil Shilton	David Pitlik & Barry Gurstein	January 29, 2000	102
12	12	"A Dog's Life"	Tim O'Donnell	Andrew Gottlieb & Thomas W. Lynch	February 5, 2000	111
13	13	"Return of Gigi"	Gil Shilton	Jerry Colker	February 12, 2000	117
14	14	"Meet the New Boss"	Christopher Coppola	Mindy Morgenstern & Terry Maloney Haley	February 19, 2000	119
15	15	"Lie Like a Dog"	Steve Dubin	Brian Kahn	February 26, 2000	116
16	16	"April Fools"	Kim Fields	Terry Maloney Haley & Mindy Morgenstern	April 1, 2000	118
17	17	"Good Cop, Bad Dog"	Paul Hoen	Terry Maloney Haley & Mindy Morgenstern	October 8, 2000	114
18	18	"Big Dog"	Carl Gottlieb	David Pitlik & Barry Gurstein	October 15, 2000	115
19	19	"Fur Better or Worse"	Allison Liddi	Thomas W. Lynch & Andrew Gottlieb	October 22, 2000	120
20	20	"A Very Canine Christmas"	Brian Roberts	Andrew Gottlieb	December 5, 2000	112

=== Season 2 (2001) ===
No. overall	No. in season	Title	Directed by	Written by	Original release date	
21	1	"Homeward Hound, Part 1 Deed #87"	Rich Wafer	Story by : Thomas W. Lynch; Teleplay by : Tim Hill & Mike Rubiner	January 27, 2001	201
22	2	"Homeward Hound, Part 2 Deed #87"	Rich Wafer	Story by : Thomas W. Lynch; Teleplay by : Tim Hill & Mike Rubiner	January 27, 2001	202
23	3	"Personal Trainer Deed #84"	Rich Wafer	Susan Nirah Jaffee	February 3, 2001	207
24	4	"Eddie Loves Tori Deed #86"	Paul Hoen	Bob Mittenthal	February 10, 2001	203
25	5	"A Star is Born Deed #83"	Jonathan Winfrey	Story by : Bob Rosenfarb; Teleplay by : Bob Rosenfarb & Bob Mittenthal	February 17, 2001	
26	6	"Matchmaking Mutt Deed #82"	Steve Dubin	Jayne Hamil	February 24, 2001	
27	7	"So Shoe Me Deed #81"	Topper Carew	Story by : Tim Hill; Teleplay by : Rick Groel	March 3, 2001	
28	8	"Sick as a Dog Deed #80"	Christopher Coppola	Jay Martel	March 10, 2001	
29	9	"Ruby Deed 79"	Steve Dubin	Alison Taylor	March 17, 2001	
30	10	"Whistle a Happy Tune Deed 78"	Steve Dubin	Jay Martel	March 24, 2001	
31	11	"You Talk Too Much Deed #77"	Courtney Selan	Bob Mittenthal	April 7, 2001	
32	12	"Eye of the Mongrel Deed #76"	Christopher Coppola	Jed Spingarn	April 14, 2001	

=== Season 3 (2002) ===
No. overall	No. in season	Title	Directed by	Written by	Original release date
33	1	"Doggie Do Right Deed 68"	Scott McGinnis	Story by : Mike Rubiner; Teleplay by : Vijal Patel	March 3, 2002
34	2	"Fowl deeds Deed 74"	Rich Wafer	Jayne Hamil	March 10, 2002
35	3	"Slapshot Deed 66"	Topper Carew	Jim Hecht	March 17, 2002
36	4	"Dog Interrupted deed 72"	Christopher Coppola	Mike Rubiner	March 24, 2002
37	5	"Welcome to the Doghouse deed 70"	Steve Dubin	Tim Hill	March 31, 2002
38	6	"Teachers Pet Peeved Deed 64"	Patrick Williams	Scott Fellows	April 7, 2002
39	7	"Deep Blue Deed Deed 62"	Christopher Coppola	Kevin Kopelow and Heath Seifert	April 14, 2002
40	8	"Lost and Found Deed 60" "Found and Dead"	Steve Dubin	Jonas E. Agin & Anthony S. Cipriano	April 21, 2002
