= Thomas W. Lynch =

American screenwriter

- Born: February 25, 1956 (age 70); Los Angeles, California, U.S.
- Occupations: Television producer, media proprietor

Thomas W. Lynch (born February 25, 1956) is an American television producer. He is the founder of the Tom Lynch Company (previously Lynch Entertainment; owned by Lynch Pictures, as well as Lynch/Biller Productions with Gary Biller), based in Los Angeles and founded in 1983. He has co-created several children's television programs, including Kids Incorporated and The Jersey for the Disney Channel, Class of 3000 for Cartoon Network, and five shows for Nickelodeon: The Secret World of Alex Mack, Caitlin's Way, Romeo!, Make It Pop, and The Other Kingdom.

== Career ==
The New York Times referred to him as "the David E. Kelley of Tween TV", a reference to his prolific array of successful television shows aimed at the 8- to 14-year-old age group. He has created several hit teenage/children's programs such as The Secret World of Alex Mack, The Journey of Allen Strange, and the drama series Caitlin's Way for Nickelodeon and the drama series Scout's Safari for Discovery Kids (which also aired on NBC during its original run on Discovery Kids).

Lynch also created the TBS music video series Night Tracks and the popular long-running syndicated/Disney Channel musical-variety series Kids Incorporated, which spawned the careers of several future stars such as Jennifer Love Hewitt and Stacy Ferguson (known as Fergie of the popular R&B group The Black Eyed Peas). Kids Incorporated was Lynch's first hit series. By the 1980s, Gary Biller was Lynch's partner, thus identifying it as Lynch/Biller Productions.

By the 2000s, he also executive produced the dramedy Sk8 and the ground-breaking teen drama Just Deal for NBC's TNBC Saturday morning lineup, the sitcoms 100 Deeds for Eddie McDowd and Romeo! for Nickelodeon, the drama South of Nowhere for Noggin's nighttime block "The N," the sci-fi series Galidor: Defenders of the Outer Dimension for YTV, and the animated musical series Class of 3000 for Cartoon Network. In 2009, Lynch executive produced two new series: the comedy series The Assistants for The N, and the sci-fi comedy The Troop for Nickelodeon. The Troop filmed its second season and aired late 2010/early 2011.

In addition to his Emmy nomination for Outstanding Children's Series for Scout's Safari, Lynch's shows have been nominated for GLAAD Awards, Humanitas Prize, Kids Choice Awards, Teen Choice Awards, WGA Awards, DGA Awards, Image Awards, Gemini Awards, Leo Awards and Young Artists Awards.

Lynch has written pilots for a number of networks such as NBC, FX and CBS. He currently is in development on several projects for Nickelodeon, The N, MTV, Spike and Cartoon Network.

In 2011, Lynch executive-produced Bucket & Skinner's Epic Adventures for Nickelodeon.

In 2015, Lynch created Make It Pop starring Megan Lee, Louriza Tronco, Erika Tham, and Dale Whibley. It premiered on Nickelodeon on March 26. Make It Pop is renewed for a second Season and it premiered on January 4, 2016, with a Christmas special aired December 5, 2015.

In 2016, The Other Kingdom officially premiered April 10, 2016, on Nickelodeon and Lynch served as creator and executive producer of the show.

In 2023, Lynch was the executive producer and showrunner of the TV series I Woke Up a Vampire, premiering on May 5, 2023, and currently streaming on Netflix. The show starred Kaileen Angelic Chang, who was a nominee for the Canadian Screen Award's 2024 Best Lead Performer, Children's or Youth.

== Personal life ==
Lynch was born and raised in Los Angeles, where his father was a nuclear physicist and his mother a bookkeeper for large law firms. His siblings are sisters Mary Josephine (Joey) and Raphael and brothers Anthony, Colum, Desmond and Niall. His parents divorced when he was eight.

Lynch and his wife Christine have four children.

== Filmography ==
=== Television ===
Year	TV Series	Credit	Notes
1976	The Jacksons	Production Assistant	
1983–1991	Kids Incorporated	Co-Creator, Producer, Executive Producer	
1983–1992	Night Tracks	Co-Creator, Producer, Executive Producer	
1984	Linda Ronstadt in Concert: What’s New	Co-Executive Producer	
1986	Combat High	Executive Producer	Television film
1989	The Diceman Cometh	Producer	
1991	Riders in the Sky	Executive Producer	1 Episode
1993	Xuxa	Director, executive producer	
1994–1998	The Secret World of Alex Mack	Writer, director, executive producer, Co-Creator	
1995	Breakthroughs: Amazing Things To Come	Executive Producer	Television film
1996	Shadow Zone: The Undead Express	Executive Producer	Television film
1996	The Pathfinder	Screenplay By, Executive Producer	Television film
1997	Sea World and Busch Gardens Adventures: Alien Vacation!	Executive Producer	
1997	Shadow Zone: My Teacher Ate My Homework	Executive Producer	
1997	Song of Hiawatha	Executive Producer	
1997–2000	The Journey of Allen Strange	Writer, executive producer, Creator	
1998	Magic Jersey	Producer	TV Pilot To "The Jersey"
1999	Smiling Fish and Goat on Fire	Executive Producer	
1999	Stray Dog	Written By	Television film, A prequel to "Caitlin's Way".
1999–2002	100 Deeds for Eddie McDowd	Writer, executive producer	
1999–2004	The Jersey	Co-Creator, Writer, Executive Producer	
2000-2002	Caitlin's Way	Co-Creator, Executive Producer	
2000-2002	Just Deal	Co-Creator, Writer, Executive Producer	
2001–2002	Skate	Co-Creator, Writer, Executive Producer	
2002	Galidor	Creator, Writer, Executive Producer	
2002	The Red Sneakers	Executive Producer	Television film
2002	Favor & Family	Executive Producer	
2002	Prep	Executive Producer	Television film
2002–2004	Scout's Safari	Creator, Writer, Executive Producer	
2003–2006	Romeo!	Co-Creator, Writer, Executive Producer	
2004	Have You Heard? Secret Central	Executive Producer	Direct to Video
2005–2008	South of Nowhere	Creator, Writer, Executive Producer	
2006–2008	Class of 3000	Co-Creator, Writer, Executive Producer	
2009	The Assistants	Executive Producer	1 Episode
2009–2013	The Troop	Writer, executive producer	
2010	Amira	Key Grip	Direct To Video
2010	Madso's War	Executive Producer	Television film
2011–2013	Bucket & Skinner's Epic Adventures	Writer, executive producer	
2014	S.H.R.I.E.K.	Executive Producer	5 episodes
2014	Smart Alec	Executive Producer	Television film
2015	Vacation Chasers	Executive Producer	
2015–2016	Make It Pop	Co-Creator, Writer, Executive Producer	
2016	The Other Kingdom	Creator, Writer, Director, Executive Producer	
2023	I Woke Up a Vampire	Creator, Writer, Executive Producer	
2024	En Pointe	Executive Producer	15-minute short
