= Megan Lee =

Korean-American pop singer (born 1995)

Megan Hyerin Lee
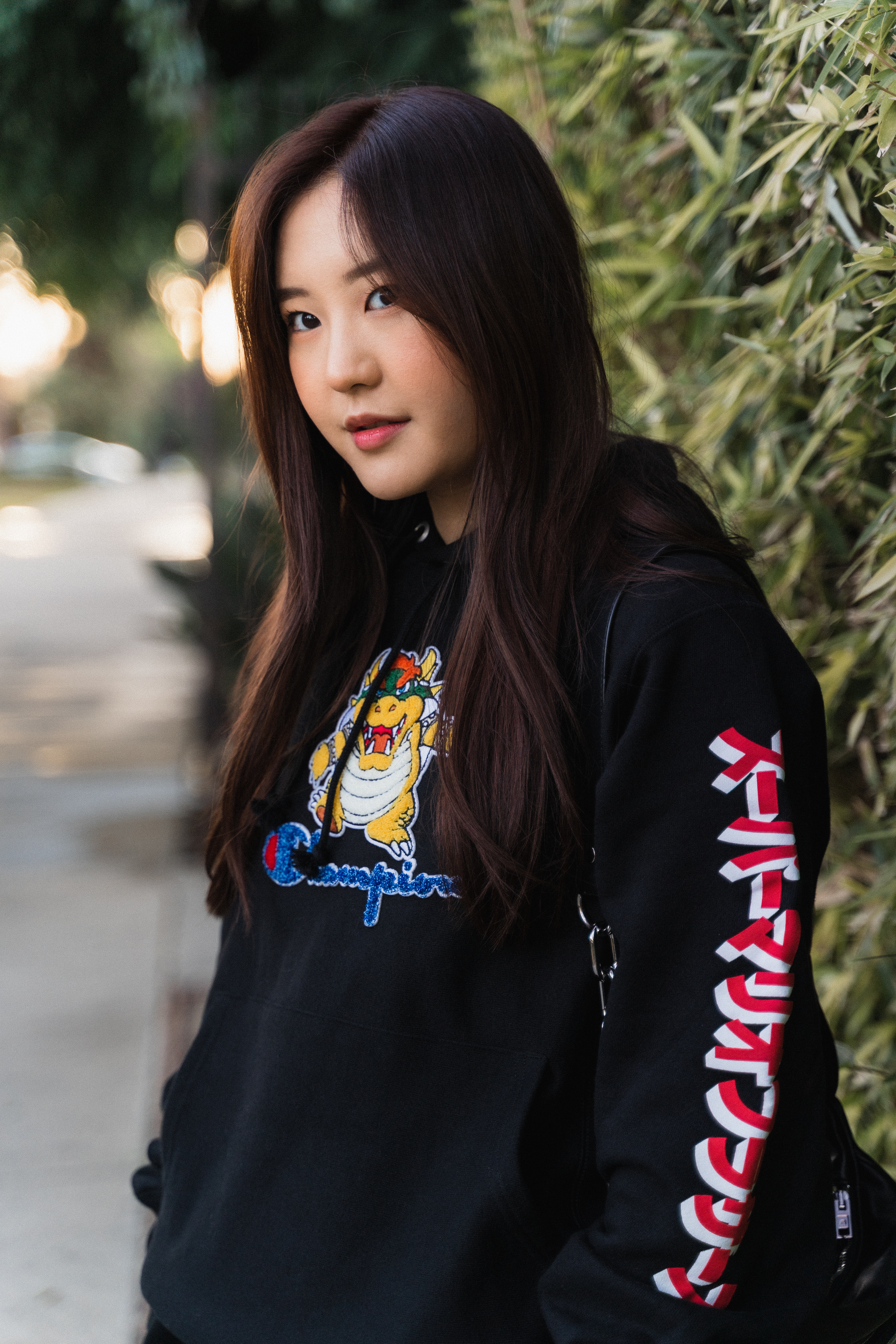
- Lee in 2020
- Born: September 18, 1995 (age 31); Los Angeles, California, U.S.
- Other name: 이혜린
- Occupations: Actress; Director; Writer
- Years active: 2008–present
- Known for: Make It Pop

Megan Lee (born September 18, 1995) is an American actress, director, and former singer-songwriter best known for her role as "Sun Hi Song" on Make It Pop and her singing talents on YouTube.

== Early life and education ==
Lee was born in Los Angeles, California and raised in Northridge, California. She officially began her professional career in acting and singing at the age of ten. In 2013, she eventually moved to Seoul, South Korea and was home-schooled through high school after having been signed to South Korean Kim Tae-woo's (lead singer of g.o.d) label, Soul Shop Entertainment.

== Career ==
=== 2007–2010: Early acting roles and Nickelodeon ===
Since the age of ten, Lee first appeared in numerous national commercials including spots for McDonald's, Verizon Wireless, Nintendo (the Nintendo DS), Bratz, Kidz Bop, Wal-Mart, Big Lots, and Trix as well as TV programs such as the Crash TV series, iCarly, Nickelodeon's Kids' Choice Awards, Disney's Get Connected, 3 Minute Game Show and various independent film projects.

In 2008, Lee had won the Nickelodeon Kids' Choice Awards Best Speech Contest at the 2008 Kids' Choice Awards. She also played Hyori in the Short Film/Music Video, My First Crush, directed by Rocky Jo, with Arden Cho starring as the older Hyori. Also in 2008, Lee starred as "Julie" in several episodes of Disney's TV series Disney Get Connected. She also played "Ji Sun" in an episode of Crash alongside Dennis Hopper, Tom Sizemore, Brian Tee and Kelvin Han Yee.

=== 2014–2022: Transition to mainstream roles ===
In 2014, Lee was officially cast and starred as a lead member of XO-IQ, featured in the hit Nickelodeon series Make It Pop. She was one of the show's three main stars and plays a character named "Sun Hi Song", alongside Filipino-Canadian Louriza Tronco and Singaporean-Canadian Erika Tham. The series was co-produced by Nick Cannon.

After Make It Pop finished airing for two seasons on Nickelodeon, Lee would go on to appear in several other television shows and feature films, such as The Other Kingdom, Modern Family and S.W.A.T.

Lee will next appear on Murmur after having won several film festival awards, including Best Ensemble, alongside fellow co-stars Logan Polish, Colin Ford, Johnny Jay Lee, Cyrus Arnold, and Brandon Wilson, and directed by Mark Polish.

=== 2022 to present: Film directing ===
In 2022, Lee began taking film directing courses at UCLA, studying under TV director Peter Lauer. She made her official directorial debut in 2023 with her short film titled En Pointe.

== Music ==
Lee writes her own original songs and released three singles as an independent artist, "In The Future", "Love, Laugh & Live" and "Destiny". "Love, Laugh & Live" was Megan's first official music video and was shot and directed by Steve Nguyen. "Destiny" was also made into a music video, and was directed by Timothy Tau. In May 2019, she released her debut extended play, I Am. and released a new single, "Me, Myself and I", with its lyric video released simultaneously; the song served as the lead single of her debut extended play, I Am, which was released on May 24.

=== K-Pop ===
Lee also contested in South Korea's popular show, MBC Star Audition - The Great Birth (위대한 탄생) Season 1 (and Season 2) on one of South Korea's main broadcast networks (MBC). On Season 2 of MBC's Star Audition, Lena Park personally selected Lee over a number of other competitors to be her mentor. She also finished in the Top 13 of contestants at the end of Season 2. Lee has also written music for various K-Pop artists such as Exo's Baekhyun and Girls' Generation's Taeyeon.

Lee's official debut track during her time on Soul Shop Entertainment was entitled "8dayz" (read as 8 Days), which was released on May 15, 2014. The track features B2ST's Yong Jun-hyung, and is also composed by German composers Andreas Bärtels and Rüdiger Schramm, who also composed a track for veteran K-pop singer Nami.

Lee and her vocals are also featured in the g.o.d reunion track, "The Story of Our Lives". The music video for the song was released on July 11, 2014, and marked the first time the band g.o.d has sung together in over ten years.

Lee has also released a music video and track with Kim Tae-woo entitled "Oppa".

On November 10, 2014, Megan Lee filed a civil lawsuit with the Seoul District Court against Soul Shop Entertainment requesting nullification of her five-year contract. Lee, along with her representation, claimed that she was severely verbally abused by some of the members of management, and that intimidation tactics were used to impose their will on her career. She also claimed that a contract was signed on her behalf without her consent, a fraudulent bank account in her name was made without her consent, and that the financial activity regarding her career with Soul Shop was not made transparent as it was promised to her in their initial agreement with the label.

During the second half of 2018, a song written by Lee titled "Psycho", which was sung by EXO's Baekhyun, was performed exclusively during EXO's recent Elyxion concert. The original piece was solely written by Lee, and produced by Zayson, and soon went viral.

Lee also co-wrote "Horizon" for Taeyeon's Japanese extended play, Voice.

=== The Voice ===
In 2018, Lee was a contestant in season 14 of the American music talent show The Voice, where she was eliminated in the Battle round. In an episode broadcast on March 6, 2018, she performed "Killing Me Softly with His Song", with Alicia Keys turning her chair. In the Battles Round broadcast on March 19, 2018, she was confronted with Team Alicia teammate Johnny Bliss both singing "Versace on the Floor" from Bruno Mars.

=== YouTube ===
Lee is most likely known for her viral covers of pop songs, many of which have received significant view counts including covers of Christina Aguilera's "I Will Be", Bruno Mars' "Lazy Song", Lil Wayne's "How to Love", Kelly Clarkson's "Stronger (What Doesn't Kill You)" and others. She has also collaborated with other YouTube artists, for example, when she covered "Forget You" by Cee Lo Green with Arden Cho in 2011. In 2011, Lee also won 2NE1's "Lonely" Cover Contest with her cover of 2NE1's single "Lonely", and was flown to Korea to meet with the group. She also made a cover of Adele's "Someone Like You" on YouTube with Sungha Jung.

In 2012, she won a Cover Contest sponsored by Jason Mraz and Warner Music Korea, and collaborated with Mraz in a duet for his track "Lucky", which is viewable on YouTube. She has also performed and recorded a number of duets with acoustic guitarist Sungha Jung, covering famous K-pop songs such as "Monster" by BIGBANG.

== Filmography ==
=== Film ===
Year	Title	Role	Notes
2008	Tranquility	Sun Kim	Short film
2008	My First Crush	Hyori	Short film
2008	A Quiet Little Marriage	School girl	
2009	Crush	Jeremy's Sister	Short film
2010	The Legend of Beaver Dam	JuJu	Short film
2010	Santa Paws		Singing voice role; uncredited
2010	The Case Against Jill	Jill	Short film
2010	Choson	Mi-ok	Short film
2011	L.A. Coffin School	Connie/Granddaughter	
2011	Love, Laugh, & Live	herself	Short film
2011	Destiny	The Artist	Short film
2014	Anita Ho	Young Anita Lee	
2014	Prophecy of Eve	Young Eve	
2017	Just Another Nice Guy	Sandra	
2017	Back To SCHOOL vs Back To WORK!	Vicky	
2022	Murmur	Kenzie	Feature film
2022	Teardrop	Teala	Feature film
2022	Sing	Herself	Music Video; Creative Director
2023	En Pointe	N/A	Short film; Director and writer only
2025	KPop Demon Hunters	Additional Voices	

=== Television ===
Year	Title	Role	Notes
2008	Battleground Earth	Chaperone kid	Episode: "Something's Fishy"
2008	Disney Get Connected	Julie	4 episodes
2008	Crash	Ji Sun	Episode: "Pissing in the Sandbox"
2009	BrainSurge	Herself	Contestant; episode 1.1
2009	Lost Tapes	Joey Sykes	Episode: "Jersey Devil"
2010	3 Minute Game Show	Herself	Contestant; episode: "Camp Rock 2: Part 5"
2010	Star Audition: The Great Birth	Herself	Contestant
2011	Star Audition: The Great Birth 2	Herself	Contestant
2015–2016	Make It Pop	Sun Hi Song	Lead role
2016	The Other Kingdom	Sunny	Episode: "Get a Job"
2017	Modern Family	Florence	Episode: "The Long Goodbye"
2018	The Voice (Season 14)	Herself	Contestant
2018	S.W.A.T.	Lila	Episode: "School"

== Discography ==
=== Original singles ===
Year	Title	Album	Notes
2011	"Love, Laugh & Live"		
2011	"Destiny"		
2011	"In the Future"		
2014	"8dayz"		First professional single, released as 메건리
2014	"Ready for Love"	You Are My Destiny OST Part 3	Released as 메건리
2015	"Make It Pop (Acoustic Mashup)"		
2016	"Stronger"		
2019	"Me, Myself and I"	I Am	
2022	"Sing"		Released with Kode PinK

=== Extended plays ===
Title	Details
I Am	To be released: May 24, 2019; Label: Wishing Tree; Formats: Digital download

=== Collaboration singles ===
Year	Title	Other(s) artist(s)	Album
2012	"Time Seemed To Have Stopped"	Hyeokseong & Wooyeonseok	New Story Part 4
2013	"Brother" (오빠)	Kim Tae-woo	T-Love
2014	"The Story of Our Lives" (우리가 사는 이야기)	g.o.d	Chapter 8
2017	"Young & Broken"	No Riddim	Non-album singles
2018	"Ice Cold"	4B	Non-album singles

=== Cover singles ===
Year	Title	Original artist(s)
2011	"The Lazy Song"	Bruno Mars
2011	"I Will Be"	Christina Aguilera
2011	"Nice Girls" (feat. Justin Chon)	inspired by Ryan Higa, Chester See & KevJumba's "Nice Guys"
2011	"I Really Like You" (feat. Jason Chen)	Carly Rae Jepsen
2011	"Magic Castle" (마법의 성) (feat. Ensemble Memo)	TVXQ
2011	"He Said She Said" (닭살커플) (feat. Jonathan Sim)	Tim feat. Esna
2011	"Lighters" (feat. Danakadan & Paul Kim)	Bad Meets Evil feat. Bruno Mars
2011	"How to Love"	Lil Wayne
2011	"A Whole New World" (feat. Raymond J Lee)	Peabo Bryson & Regina Belle
2011	"Y.O.U.Tube Baby" (feat. Pk)	inspired by Nat King Cole's "L-O-V-E"
2012	"Domino"	Jessie J
2012	"Boyfriend"	Justin Bieber
2012	"Payphone"	Maroon 5 feat. Wiz Khalifa
2012	"잔소리 (Nagging)" (feat. Mike Choi)	IU & Seulong
2012	"Safe and Sound"	Taylor Swift & The Civil Wars
2012	"Monster" (feat. Sungha Jung)	Big Bang
2013	"22 (Acoustic)"	Taylor Swift
2016	"In the Night (Acoustic Version)" (feat. Jason Chen)	The Weeknd
