= Sawfish (disambiguation) =

A Sawfish is a large, endangered cartilaginous fish with a saw-shaped nose.

Sawfish may also refer to:

- Sawfish (window manager), a window manager for Unix systems running X
- Sawfish harvester, a submersible robot equipped with a chainsaw for harvesting underwater trees
