= List of Life with Boys episodes =

Life with Boys is a Canadian teen sitcom that originally aired in Canada on YTV from September 2011 to August 2013. It follows 14-year-old Tess Foster as she navigates her way through the turmoil of teen life while living at home with her single, overprotective dad and three brothers. Although Tess adores the four important men in her life, they do have four totally different perspectives. Despite the shortcomings of being the only girl in a male household, the boys can sometimes offer solid advice. Whether it's building up the courage to talk to a boy, dealing with an obnoxious one, or coping with the repercussions of being the only girl on the boys' wrestling team, Life with Boys sheds a comedic light on many of life's difficult moments.

== Series overview ==
| Season | Episodes | Originally released | |
| Season | Episodes | First released | Last released |
|---|---|---|---|
| 1 | 22 | September 9, 2011 | October 9, 2012 |
| 2 | 18 | October 23, 2012 | August 27, 2013 |

== Episodes ==
=== Season 1 (2011–12) ===
Note: This show was apparently never broadcast in proper order, neither in Canada nor in the US. The production code numbers reflect the order in which the episodes were produced.

| No. overall | No. in season | Title | Directed by | Written by | Original release date | Prod. code |
|---|---|---|---|---|---|---|
| 1 | 1 | "Wrestling with Boys" | Steve Wright | Douglas Lieblein & R.J. Colleary | September 9, 2011 | 102 |
Tess Foster wants to join the school wrestling team, but her father, who is also the school's gym teacher, declines as she is not a boy and can get hurt a lot easier. Tess is furious and doesn't like being stereotyped, so she tries to join the team even though her dad told her not to. Guest stars: Genevieve Kang as Poster Girl and Austin Macdonald as Andy Jacobs
| 2 | 2 | "A Perfect Life with Boys" | Stefan Scaini | Julie Sherman Wolfe | September 16, 2011 | 106 |
Tess has had enough of her brothers leaving the bathroom dirty and hogging the remote control. She is particularly annoyed by their manners at dinner every night. Tess believes to have found the solution to their problem, and invites their grandmother to stay with them. However, their grandma also changes Tess, which leaves Tess no longer sure if she even has the right to change their behavior. Guest star: Judy Marshak as Grandma Helen
| 3 | 3 | "Monkey Talk with Boys" | Steve Wright | Michael Poryes | September 23, 2011 | 108 |
Tess and Allie are very excited when they are invited to a prestigious party. Tess tries her best to convince the host of the party to invite her brother Sam, and the host agrees. What she does not realize, however, is that Sam is to be ridiculed in front of everyone. When Tess tells Sam the truth, he is devastated. Only Gabe can make him feel better, and Tess makes an interesting observation: guys seem to have their own language. Guest stars: Chelsea Clark as Stacey, Francesca Martin as Kaylee, Maxwell Uretsky as Billy and Daniel Wilson as Nerdy Nicky
| 4 | 4 | "In the Principal's Office with Boys" | Steve Wright | Douglas Lieblein | October 7, 2011 | 105 |
Tess and Allie have little time for themselves and often argue over small things. They want to save their friendship and make a pact: Tess is willing to try as a cheerleader, and Allie comes along on a camping trip with the Foster family. They discover that true friendship does not necessarily have common hobbies. Guest stars: Madison Scott as Chloe, Chelsea Clark as Stacey and Francesca Martin as Kaylee
| 5 | 5 | "This Time the Problem Is with Dad and Not with Boys" | Steve Wright | Julie Sherman Wolfe | October 14, 2011 | 114 |
Tess breaks her promise to Jack that she wouldn't get her ears pierced until she was fifteen but before she can tell him the truth, he gives her permission... but can she go to a party knowing she lied to get there? Meanwhile, Sam, Gabe, Spencer and Walter (their dog) are all mad at Jack because he can't remember the parental pass code. This whole time he was doing the old one because, Spencer changed the pass code so only he can watch TV. Guest star: Nicki Gallo as Earring Tech
| 6 | 6 | "Social Death with Boys" | Steve Wright | Steven Peterman | November 4, 2011 | 113 |
When Jack finds out that Tess and Sam were included in the math team at school, he is completely over the moon. In order to maintain his pride, Tess reluctantly agrees to join the mathletes. However, it is not easy for her, because she knows that her reputation as a cool girl is at risk. But then she makes a startling discovery: The other math professionals themselves are pretty cool. Later, they film Tess accidentally farting on camera, and they wanted to post it around the school... Guest stars: Chelsea Clark as Stacey, Ryan Bobkin as Gordon, Tyler Murree as Bird on a wire (voice) and Daniel Wilson as Nerdy Nicky
| 7 | 7 | "Set Up's with Boys" | Steve Wright | Michael Poryes | November 11, 2011 | 103 |
Tess is worried that her father might remain single. So she decides to establish an online profile on a dating site, she is actively supported by Allie. In order to advertise more effectively, they secretly create a video of Jack and put it online. The video is all the rage on the website: About seven hundred interested people write Jack, but can he really "find true love?" Guest stars: Mary Ashton as Cynthia and David Sparrow as Sherman & Shermina
| 8 | 8 | "The Big Kiss Off with Boys" | Steve Wright | Gracie Glassmeyer & Steven James Meyer | November 18, 2011 | 101 |
Allie and Tess accidentally send an embarrassing photo of Sam to every girl in school. To limit the damage, Allie agrees to go out with Sam in hopes that she can boost his image again. Good plan - but Sam worries it will only make things worse. Meanwhile, there are concerns about the administration's new neighbor and Jack has an eyesore. Guest stars: Christian Golec as Kid, Alexander Conti as Travis, Kylee Evans as Heather
| 9 | 9 | "Chrisbus with Boys" | Stefan Scaini | Michael Poryes | December 9, 2011 | 112 |
Tess and her brothers find their Christmas plans wrecked when Jack announces that he wants them all to surprise Grandma for Christmas. Guest stars: Judy Marshak as Grandma Helen, Ryan Bobkin as Gordon
| 10 | 10 | "Disarmed with Boys" | Stefan Scaini | Steven Peterman | December 28, 2011 | 109 |
Jack believes that thanks to Tess's talent she could compete in the school wrestling championships and actually win. However, Tess is scheduled to compete against last year's champion, Bobby Parelli. The two have a pre-match competition, but they let it go too far making it impossible for them to compete in the actual match. Guest stars: Austin Macdonald as Andy Jacobs, John-Alan Slachta as Bobby Parelli and Naomi Snieckus as Mrs.Hooper
| 11 | 11 | "Bathroom Battles with Boys" | Stefan Scaini | Douglas Lieblein | March 9, 2012 | 118 |
Each morning there is disagreement within the Foster family over the bathroom. In order to end the quarrel once and for all, Jack decides to set up a private bathroom for Tess. However, Jack has to take a second job in order to pay for the construction costs. Tess feels guilty and wonders if another bathroom is really necessary. Guest stars: Peter DaCunha as Amusement park kid and Brittany Gray as Flight Attendant
| 12 | 12 | "Misguided Motives with Boys" | Steve Wright | Steven James Meyer | March 23, 2012 | 107 |
Since Tess has joined the wrestling team, she hasn't been on any dates with a boy. Kaylee says that girls who are on the wrestling team aren't attractive to boys. In order to prove Kaylee wrong, Tess decides to go on a date, but cannot find one. Luckily she has brothers. Guest star: Francesca Martin as Kaylee
| 13 | 13 | "Double Trouble with Boys" | Stefan Scaini | Julie Sherman Wolfe | April 6, 2012 | 111 |
Allie and Tess make it clear that Tess doesn't want to go out with Bobby. So Bobby and Tess meet secretly until Tess finds the courage to tell Allie the truth. But when a photo of Tess, Bobby and Emily Osment appears in the newspaper, it is increasingly difficult for Tess to keep her secret from Allie. In the end, Allie says that Tess can stay with Bobby. Special guest star: Emily Osment as herself Guest star: John-Alan Slachta as Bobby Parelli
| 14 | 14 | "Trouble with Boys" | Stefan Scaini | Douglas Lieblein | April 13, 2012 | 110 |
Tess is totally blown away when she finds out that Allie starts going out with Bobby Parelli. Tess goes with the two to the movies, but she uses the opportunity to show Bobby all differences between him and Allie. However, it causes Bobby to instead start showing interest in Tess. Guest star: John Alan-Slachta as Bobby
| 15 | 15 | "When Something Better Comes Along with Boys" | Steve Wright | Douglas Lieblein | May 18, 2012 | 116 |
Αfter Tess started dating Bobby, she spends a lot of time with him and she always forgets Allie, which makes her angry. Guest star: Madison Scott as Chloe and John Alan-Slachta as Bobby
| 16 | 16 | "Hitting the Breaks with Boys" | Steve Wright | Douglas Lieblein | May 25, 2012 | 117 |
After Tess breaks up with Bobby, Allie wants her to date someone else, but she keeps saying she is not ready. Meanwhile, Gabe has to pass a driving test. Guest stars: Dale Whibley as Connor McGill, John Alan-Slachta as Bobby (flashback from previous episode), Fransesca Martin as Kaylee
| 17 | 17 | "Fashion Faux Pas with Boys" | Steve Wright | Michael Poryes & Steven Peterman | June 1, 2012 | 115 |
When a fashion guru comes to Westfield, Tess tries to impress him by creating a contest-winning design that will get her all the way to New York. Guest stars: Christian Golec as Bucket Kid and Alexander Conti as Travis
| 18 | 18 | "Birthdays with Boys" | Stefan Scaini | Steven Peterman | September 14, 2012 | 104 |
Jack's heart is heavy when he sees how quickly his children are growing up. This makes it more difficult for Tess, who is trying not to make her 15th birthday feel like a child's birthday. Guest star: Austin Macdonald as Andy Jacobs
| 19 | 19 | "Smokin' with Boys" | Stefan Scaini | Michael Poryes | September 21, 2012 | 120 |
Tess discovers Sam smoking in an attempt to integrate into a group of students, so she meddles like usual. But when the meddling ends up in her getting caught with a cigarette by her dad, she organizes a secret sibling meeting with Gabe.
| 20 | 20 | "Nightmares with Boys" | Steve Wright | Story by : Doug Lieblein; Teleplay by : Gracie Glassmeyer | September 25, 2012 | 121 |
Jack starts dating Kaylee's mom and tells Tess to get along with Kaylee. After her efforts fail, Tess comes up with a plan to separate her dad and Kaylee's mom. Guest star : Fransesca Martin as Kaylee
| 21 | 21 | "Driven Crazy with Boys" | Stefan Scaini | Story by : Steven Peterman; Teleplay by : Gracie Glassmeyer | October 2, 2012 | 122 |
Tess and Sam are drifting into madness. They're always in a continuous competition with each other, and after fifteen years, they find it increasingly difficult to tolerate so many disputes. But then Tess receives a scholarship to another school and says yes without hesitation. But is a change of school really a good idea?
| 22 | 22 | "Blah, Blah, Blah with Boys" | Stefan Scaini | Story by : Michael Poryes; Teleplay by : Gracie Glassmeyer | October 9, 2012 | 119 |
Tess and Allie are looking forward to a school trip to Italy.

=== Season 2 (2012–13) ===
| No. overall | No. in season | Title | Directed by | Written by | Original release date | Prod. code |
|---|---|---|---|---|---|---|
| 23 | 1 | "Do You Wanna Dance With Boys" | Steve Wright | Story by : Michael Poryes & Steven Peterman; Teleplay by : Ari Posner | October 23, 2012 | 206 |
When acting girly to get a cute boy to ask her to dance fails, a mysterious witch makes Tess's off-the-cuff wish to become a boy a reality, leading Tess to discover that being a member of the opposite gender isn't easier most of the time. Meanwhile, Spencer said that he ate all the Halloween candy so now he and Jack have to go trick or treating around the block to get candy. Guest star: Dylan Everett as Hunter
| 24 | 2 | "Naughty and Nice with Boys" | Brian K. Roberts | Ari Posner | December 11, 2012 | 204 |
Every year Jack tries to get the family to pose for the perfect holiday card photo and every year his plan fails. So when the kids disappoint him yet again by botching the photo shoot, Tess feels guilty and makes them all swear to stop fighting, as the ultimate Christmas gift for dad. The strain of bottling up their frustration leads to a big fight, and Spencer, afraid his misbehavior will land him on Santa's naughty list, runs away from home. Tess tracks Spencer down at the mall, where the Santa imparts some pretty good wisdom, helping them all enjoy a better holiday season.
| 25 | 3 | "Girl-Entine's Day With Boys" | Steve Wright | Story by : Michael Poryes & Steven Peterman; Teleplay by : Steven James Meyer | February 14, 2013 | 211 |
After Tess is alone on Valentines Day, she and Allie come up with the idea of "Girl-entines day". Then she gets a date with a boy named Blake. But she does not want to disappoint Allie so she goes on a date with him and spend the night with the girls simultaneously until that is discovered and she gets to spend the rest of the night with her dad. Guest star: Brendan Meyer as Blake Notes: Even though this is episode 3 of season 2, this is the first episode with the modified season 2 theme song.
| 26 | 4 | "Promoting Change With Boys" | Steve Wright | Heather Wordham | March 19, 2013 | 205 |
Tess is determined to keep Jack on as her wrestling coach, even if it means helping him land the dreaded position of Vice Principal in charge of school discipline. Tess and Allie try to make the school look like a problem school so the school would need a vice principal which could be her dad. Meanwhile, Spencer dresses as a girl to sell more cookies. Note: This episode premiered in Nickelodeon (Latin America) on February 10, 2013.
| 27 | 5 | "Getting Up Off The Mat With Boys" | Steve Wright | Billy Grundfest | March 26, 2013 | 212 |
When the school district refuses to replace the wrestling team's dilapidated mats, Tess produces a video that changes their minds, only to discover that an allergy to the new mats makes them more dangerous to her than the old ones.
| 28 | 6 | "Up All Night With Boys" | Brian K. Roberts | Story by : Michael Poryes & Steven Peterman; Teleplay by : Douglas Lieblein | April 2, 2013 | 201 |
Jack drives with Gabe and Sam to a concert. Tess is taking care of Spencer while having a girls' night with Allie.
| 29 | 7 | "Being Superduperficial With Boys" | Brian K. Roberts | Billy Grundfest | April 9, 2013 | 202 |
Tess tries to get Gabe to date a girl he wouldn't go for. To show him that she isn't superficial, she goes out with a boy named DJ, but it turns out that she doesn't like him. Guest star: Cameron Kennedy as DJ
| 30 | 8 | "Working Like a Dog With Boys" | Stefan Scaini | Jay J. Demopoulos | April 16, 2013 | 203 |
Tess works together with Allie part-time as a dog washer. She doesn't think that Allie can do any good so she does all the work for her. When she finally lets Allie do some work herself, Allie leaves the back door open and a dog escapes.
| 31 | 9 | "Chasing Rats With Boys" | Brian K. Roberts | Maria Brown-Gallenberg | April 23, 2013 | 209 |
Tess goes out with a cute guy who keeps making bets with friends about what he can get her to do, while Spencer brings home the school rat, and loses it in the house freaking out Sam. Guest star: Ricardo Hoyos as Wyatt
| 32 | 10 | "Carmageddon With Boys" | Steve Wright | Maria Brown-Gallenberg | April 30, 2013 | 213 |
Tess and Sam make their driver's licenses. So the three kids make a schedule about when each of them can use their dad's car. When Tess gets a call from Allie she takes the car from Gabe to help Allie out, but then she can't find the car and accidentally breaks into another car that looks the same.
| 33 | 11 | "Young and Stupid With Boys" | Stefan Scaini | Story by : Michael Poryes & Steven Peterman; Teleplay by : Jay J. Demopoulos & Gracie Glassmeyer | July 9, 2013 | 215 |
Tess and Allie want to meet Sam's friend Adam, but Sam thinks they want to "steal" his friend. Tess seems to cause Adam to have amnesia, and must fix him before he gives a speech. But it turns out they just wanted to trick Tess.
| 34 | 12 | "Battling Bullies With Boys" | Stefan Scaini | Billy Grundfest | July 16, 2013 | 216 |
Jack forces Tess to show a nerdy new student around the school, so she tries to make him cool.
| 35 | 13 | "Let's Duet with Boys (Part 1)" | Stefan Scaini | Story by : Michael Poryes & Steven Peterman; Teleplay by : Douglas Lieblein | July 23, 2013 | 207 |
Tess and Gabe enter the same contest to win $200 but, Gabe freezes on stage when he "chokes". Tess ends up meeting Brooklyn Roebuck unexpectedly. Special guest star: Brooklyn Roebuck
| 36 | 14 | "Let's Duet with Boys (Part 2)" | Steve Wright | Story by : Michael Poryes & Steven Peterman; Teleplay by : Douglas Lieblein | July 30, 2013 | 208 |
Victoria Duffield wants Gabe and Tess to open for her concert but when Allie gets sick and needs surgery, Tess wonders if she can still sing and be by her friends side when they do surgery. Special guest star: Victoria Duffield
| 37 | 15 | "Partners in Rhyme with Boys" | Stefan Scaini | Story by : Michael Poryes & Steven Peterman; Teleplay by : Ari Posner | August 6, 2013 | 214 |
Tess sells Gabe's song to a famous musician without getting his approval first. Guest star: Ana Golja as Cassandra
| 38 | 16 | "So You Think Your Family Can Dance With Boys" | Steve Wright | Gracie Glassmeyer | August 13, 2013 | 217 |
Tess sets up their family to audition for a family dance show to pay for a plumbing incident at their house and to have the chance to afford a second bathroom. They have to learn how to dance together with the help of their neighbour Kylee who is the choreographer to be able to win the prize money. The Fosters fail in the audition but they sell the audition video for a funny clip show. Special guest star: Darren Espanto Guest star: Kylee Evans as Heather
| 39 | 17 | "Climbing the Walls With Boys" | Steve Wright | Gracie Glassmeyer | August 20, 2013 | 210 |
Jack wants to spend spring break with his family but his kids want to hang out with their friends, so Tess calls up their grandfather to keep Jack occupied.
| 40 | 18 | "Say Goodnight With Boys" | Steve Wright | Jay J.Demopoulos | August 27, 2013 | 218 |
Allie, Jack and the boys search for a tape to help calm Tess down during exam week.
