= MacHomer =

Play written by Rick Miller

- Original language: English
- Written by: Rick Miller; William Shakespeare
- Subject: William Shakespeare; The Simpsons
- Genre: Comedy; Parody

Premiere
- Date: 1995
- Official website

MacHomer is a one-person play by Rick Miller which blends William Shakespeare's tragedy Macbeth with the animated television series The Simpsons. Miller conceived the idea in 1994, when he was performing in a production of Macbeth. The first performance of MacHomer was at the Montreal Fringe Festival in 1995. MacHomer has been re-written a number of times. The early version of the play was more of a stand-up comedy routine, but in 2000, it was expanded into a theatrical production. In 2006, for the 10th anniversary tour, Miller further revamped the play, adding new songs and characters, and incorporating videos.

The script of the play "remains 85% Shakespeare" and mostly follows the plot of Macbeth. Miller performs the various roles using voices from The Simpsons characters, using more than 50 voices. The set includes a video screen at the back of the stage, and sound and video effects are incorporated into the performance. Miller has performed the play in over 150 cities around the world, including performances at the Edinburgh Festival Fringe, the Melbourne International Comedy Festival, and the Just for Laughs comedy festival.

MacHomer has received largely positive reviews from critics, with praise going to Miller's impersonations. However, some critics felt that the play seems more like a group of sketches, while others felt that Miller's Homer Simpson voice was one of his weaker impersonations. According to Miller, The Simpsons creator Matt Groening is a fan of the play and gave him permission to perform it.

== History ==
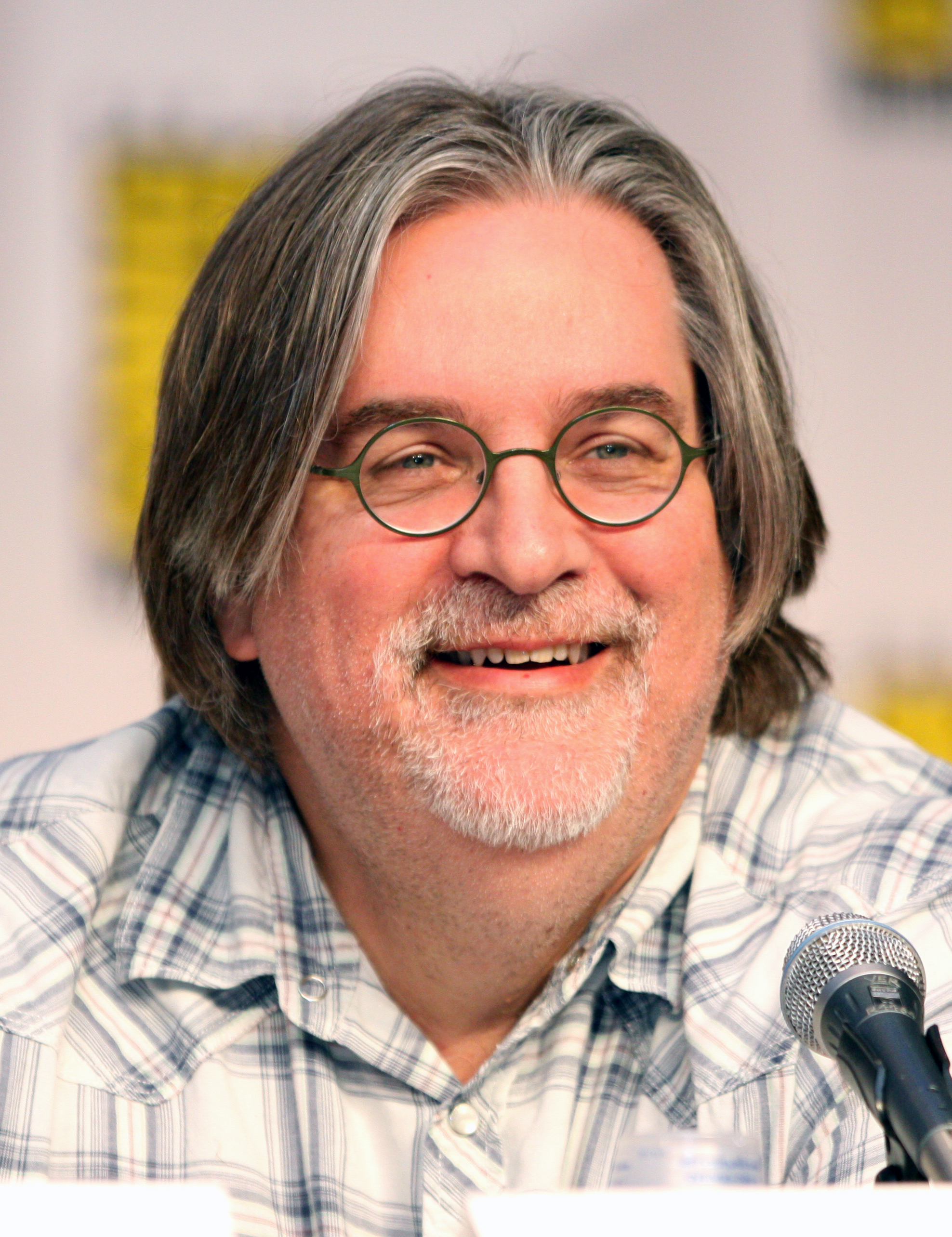
According to Rick Miller, The Simpsons creator Matt Groening approved of the play.

Canadian comedian Rick Miller conceived the idea of blending The Simpsons and Shakespeare in 1994. At the time, Miller was performing in a production of Macbeth, playing the minor role of Murderer No. 2. He said, "That's a small role, so I had a lot of time to sit backstage and concoct ideas, one of which was to make fun of our production. By then, The Simpsons had become a big part of pop culture, so I decided to do the voices of those cartoon characters in my mangled version of the play." He performed a skit at that night's closing party, which was well received.

According to Miller, he does "half of MacBeth because you can only carry the joke so far. The rest is a mix of ‘Simpsonisms.’" At first, he "did the show as a sort of brutally edited Coles Notes version of the play," while still keeping the language. Miller believes the fusion works well because "The Simpsons and Macbeth are both about dysfunctional families. The TV show's lasted because it has this basic humanity, while the play is one of Shakespeare's shortest, bloodiest works and has some of his best-known lines."

The first performance of MacHomer was at the Montreal Fringe Festival in 1995. At the time, the play "was a very basic version with a few slides and me at a mike stand." Miller began touring the following year. He has consistently changed parts of the play since its premiere. Until 2000, MacHomer was mainly a sketch comedy routine, but that year he expanded it into more of a theatrical production. The overhaul was Miller's effort "to turn it into a play I could feel comfortable touring the world with, as opposed to just playing the odd college." In 2006, for the 10th anniversary tour, Miller further revamped the play, adding new songs and characters, and incorporating videos. As of 2011, MacHomer is presented by WYRD Productions and directed by Sean Lynch. The lighting and stage design are by Beth Kates.

Initially, Miller worried that lawyers for The Simpsons would try to stop him from performing the play. At the 2000 Edinburgh Festival Fringe, the cast members of the television series were performing a special reading of dialog that featured their characters. When the producers found out that Miller was also at the festival, they invited him to a cast party. There he met The Simpsons creator Matt Groening, who had previously seen a video of MacHomer. According to Miller, "next thing I knew, Matt Groening was shaking my hand, was giving me his blessing and was telling me he'd do all he could to help me continue my show. It's the best situation I could have dreamed of. No one is suing me, or asking for royalties, either."

Miller retired MacHomer in 2012, after 17 years of performance.

== Contents ==
The script of the play "remains 85% Shakespeare" and mostly follows the plot of Macbeth, although lines from other Shakespeare plays are included. MacHomer features, according to the San Francisco Chronicle, "clever rearrangements of lines, crosscuttings between scenes, sometimes topical interpolations and assignment of roles to cartoon entities [...]." During the MacBeth portion, Miller performs the various roles using voices from The Simpsons characters. He does more than 50 voices. For example, Homer Simpson is Macbeth, Marge Simpson is Lady Macbeth, Mr. Burns is King Duncan, Ned Flanders is Banquo and Barney Gumble is Macduff. Miller also includes some non-Simpsons characters, such as Kermit the Frog. Sound and video effects are incorporated into the performance as well. According to critic Nelson Pressley of The Washington Post, "you have to give MacHomer awfully high marks for technical difficulty." At the back of the stage, there is a monitor which shows various images, including 200 drawings made by Miller. There is also a video camera hidden in a cauldron, so that when Miller looks into it, his face can be seen on the screen. Halfway through the play, he puts on a puppet show, which recaps the play to that point.

Miller ends the show with a performance of Queen's song "Bohemian Rhapsody". The song is not tied in with The Simpsons or MacBeth. Instead, Miller does impersonations of 25 different famous singers.

== Performances ==
Miller has performed the play in over 150 cities around the world. He says that he "tours sporadically, partly because I don't like to perform it straight on for months, but also because I have to fit in all my other projects." Miller has performed it at a number of festivals, including the Edinburgh Festival Fringe, the Melbourne International Comedy Festival and the Just for Laughs comedy festival in Montreal. On June 4, 2011 it was announced that MacHomer would be part of the 2012 Stratford Shakespeare Festival in Stratford, Ontario.

== Reception ==
MacHomer has received largely positive reviews from critics. Janos Gereben of the San Francisco Examiner praised Miller's performance, but felt that "It's an often funny, entertaining series of vaguely related sketches, held together only by the performer, not the material. A warning: MacHomer won’t likely speak to those who aren't Simpsons maniacs, or at least familiar with the characters. Conversely, those 'd'oh!' people shouldn't miss it." Nelson Pressley of the Washington Post called Miller's performance a "vocal tour de force", but wrote that "like a guy busting a cinder block with his forehead, Miller awes more than he delights, so it's nice that he adds value at the end by serving up hilarious vocal impressions of singers ranging from Tom Waits to Andrea Bocelli." Writing for the Modesto Bee, Lisa Millegan felt that "If any of the actors from The Simpsons ever quit, the producers should call Miller to fill in. He nails the voices for everybody, switching effortlessly from Homer to Marge to Mr. Burns and beyond. [...] Amazingly, he manages to use much of Shakespeare's dialogue while lightening it up with humorous asides and pop culture references. The story is sometimes hard to follow because Miller moves so fast, but a synopsis is printed in the program for those who want it."

Jason Blake of the Sydney Morning Herald wrote that "Miller is adept at nailing the voices, and extraordinarily fast when switching between them. His impersonation of Dan Castellaneta's Homer is probably the least accurately focused of the set but his Marge is creepily spot-on, as is his Barney Gumble." According to Gereben, "There are some misses, especially and surprisingly Miller's Homer characterization. He just doesn’t sound like our man in all his glory."

== See also ==
- "Four Great Women and a Manicure", The Simpsons episode featuring a version of MacBeth.
