= Torri Webster =

Canadian actress

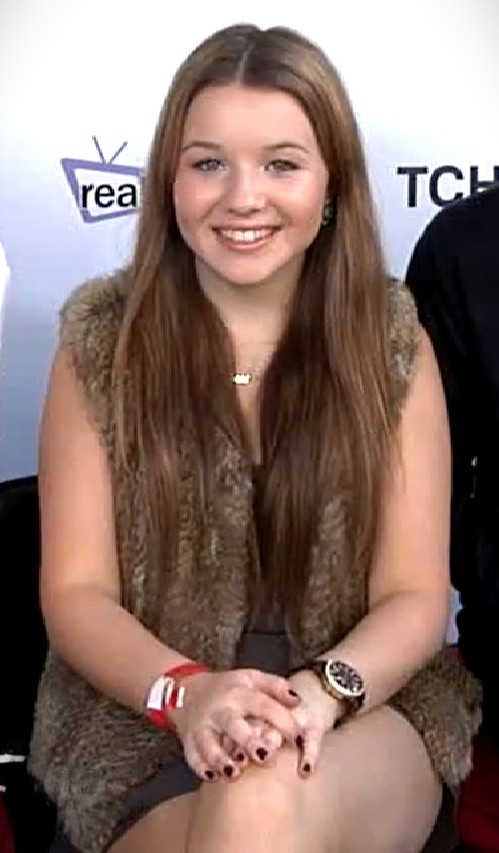
- Webster in 2011
- Born: August 12, 1996 (age 30); Toronto, Ontario, Canada
- Education: Wexford Collegiate School for the Arts
- Alma mater: New York University Tisch School of the Arts; Ryerson University (BA)
- Occupations: Actress, model
- Years active: 2010–present
- Known for: Tess Foster in Life With Boys (2011).

External image
- Torri Webster IMDb photo

Torri Webster (born August 12, 1996) is a Canadian actress. She is known for her starring role as Tess Foster in the YTV teen sitcom Life with Boys, which earned her the Young Artist Award for Best Leading Young Actress in a TV Series. Webster also played the recurring character of PeaseBlossom, an eccentric fairy in the Nickelodeon show The Other Kingdom.

== Early life and education ==
Webster was born on August 12, 1996 in Toronto, Ontario, Canada to parents Steve and Tracy Webster from the Don Mills area. As a child, Webster was always performing. She started out dancing at the age of three and loved performing on stage with her dance teams. She attended a French immersion elementary school but was drawn to the performing arts as a teen. As a teen, she attended high school at the Wexford Collegiate School for the Arts in Scarborough, Ontario, where she further enhanced her performing skills on stage playing leads in various musical theatre productions. She then studied musical theatre at the New York University Tisch School of the Arts in 2014, and marketing and film studies at Ryerson University, where she graduated with a Bachelor of Arts (Creative Industries) with distinction in 2018. Webster currently lives in her home town of Toronto, Ontario.

== Filmography ==
Television and film roles
Year	Title	Role	Notes
2010	The Town Christmas Forgot	Trish Benson	Television film
2011–2013	Life with Boys	Tess Foster	Lead role
2012	Splatalot!	Herself	Celebrity contestant
2012	Jesus Henry Christ	Girl in Cafeteria	Film
2016	The Other Kingdom	PeaseBlossom	Recurring role
2019	Wayne	Emma	Episode: "The Goddamned Bacon of Truth"
2022	Star Trek: Strange New Worlds	Ensign Zier	Episode: "Spock Amok"

== Accolades ==
Year	Award	Category	Work	Result	Refs
2013	Young Artist Award	Best Performance in a TV Series - Leading Young Actress	Life with Boys	Won	
