= Rick Miller (comedian) =

Canadian actor (born 1970)

- Born: March 12, 1970 (age 56); Canada
- Spouse: Stephanie Baptist

Comedy career
- Genres: Theatre, Musical comedy, Impressions, Observational comedy
- Website: www.rickmiller.ca

Rick Miller (born March 12, 1970) is a Canadian director, actor, comedian, musician, playwright, and podcast host. Although primarily known as a solo theatre creator and performer, Miller is also known for hosting the television series Just for Laughs and for performing a version of "Bohemian Rhapsody" during which he impersonates "twenty five of the most annoying voices in the music industry". His BOOM Trilogy of solo shows (BOOM, BOOM X, and BOOM YZ) examine 75 years of music, culture, and politics, and have been performed over 600 times across North America, Europe, and Asia.

== Education ==
Miller has two architecture degrees from McGill University.

== Career ==
Miller has created and performed in his own plays including BOOM, BOOM X, BOOM YZ, Bigger Than Jesus, MacHomer, HARDSELL 2.0 - VENDU, as well as several plays with Robert Lepage, including Lipsynch. His large-scale play called MONEY is scheduled to premiere in 2026.

The Simpsons featured a segment in the episode "Four Great Women and a Manicure" in which Homer and Marge play versions of Macbeth and Lady Macbeth, respectively. This was an idea originally conceived by Miller for his one-man show MacHomer. Matt Groening had approved of the show and allowed Miller to use his characters.

Miller is the co-creative director of Kidoons, the Canadian multimedia company that developed the family touring stage shows Twenty Thousand Leagues Under the Sea (premiered in 2015), Jungle Book (premiered in 2018), FRANKENSTEIN: A Living Comic Book (premiered in 2022), and HANS: My Life in Fairy Tales (premiered in 2025). Kidoons also produces web series for families featuring animated characters that connect to the Kidoons stage shows.

Miller is the frontman for the Toronto party band TRAINWRECK, also featuring his partner, Stephanie Baptist. In 2019, he released a compilation CD of 20 tracks from all of his solo shows called Rick Miller SONGS (from BOOM X and Other Shows).

=== Bohemian Rhapsody skit ===
Miller is known for his cover of the Queen song "Bohemian Rhapsody" "as performed by 25 of the most annoying voices in the music industry." The actual number of parodies in the sketch is 27. A video of the performance was uploaded on YouTube in 2007, and has been viewed over 1 million times. The list of parodies includes (in order): Bob Dylan, Neil Young, Michael Bolton, Corey Hart, Willie Nelson, Johnny Cash, Jon Bon Jovi, Robbie Robertson, Neil Diamond, Aaron Neville, Dennis DeYoung, Barney the Dinosaur, Aerosmith, "Any Annoying Lead Guitarist", Meat Loaf, Crash Test Dummies, Tom Petty, Beck, The B-52's, AC/DC, Metallica, The Rolling Stones, Ozzy Osbourne, Julio Iglesias, Bobby McFerrin, Andrea Bocelli, and Guns N' Roses.

=== Voice work ===
Miller has worked as a voice actor for animated television shows, films, and video games.

Characters he has voiced include:

- The Dark Prince in Prince of Persia: The Two Thrones
- Winston Churchill in Assassin's Creed Syndicate
- Principal Shawbly in Mona the Vampire
- Sparky in Atomic Betty
- Ben and Fen in Cyberchase
- Mr. Fister in Odd Job Jack
- Sydney and Captain Minus in Turtle Island
- Bongo in My Big Big Friend
- Orwin, Ashio and Freep in Magi-Nation
- Semuru - Evolution DC in Far Cry Instincts
- Snaily in The Twins
- Tiger in George of the Jungle
- Headly Diddly Dee in Skatoony
- Narrator, Colonel Weston and Doctor in Canadian Made
- Acorn Trooper (M) and Sauly in Get Squirrely
- David Sarif in Deus Ex: Mankind Divided
- Tite-Gripp in Atomic Puppet
- Various characters in Arthur, Ripley's Believe It or Not!, Scaredy Squirrel, Busytown Mysteries, and Agent Binky: Pets of the Universe
