= Make It Pop =

Canadian television series

- Genre: Musical comedy
- Created by: Thomas W. Lynch; Nick Cannon
- Starring: Megan Lee; Louriza Tronco; Erika Tham; Dale Whibley
- Theme music composer: K-KOV; Thomas W. Lynch; Tamra Keenan
- Opening theme: "Make It Pop" by XO-IQ
- Country of origin: Canada
- Original language: English
- No. of seasons: 2
- No. of episodes: 42 (list of episodes)

Production
- Executive producers: Nick Cannon; Thomas W. Lynch; Steven DeNure; Anne Loi
- Camera setup: Single-camera
- Production companies: DHX Media Toronto; Nickelodeon Productions

Original release
- Network: Nickelodeon
- Release: March 26, 2015 – August 20, 2016

Make It Pop is a Canadian musical comedy series created by Thomas W. Lynch and Nick Cannon that aired on Nickelodeon from March 26, 2015 to August 20, 2016. The series stars Megan Lee, Louriza Tronco, Erika Tham, and Dale Whibley.

== Plot ==
Make It Pop follows three girls named Sun Hi, Jodi, and Corki around Mackendrick Prep, a boarding high school, who form a K-pop girl group called XO-IQ, with the help of Caleb, and find music, mischief, love, and friendship.

== Episodes ==
Season	Episodes	Originally released	
Season	Episodes	First released	Last released
1	20	March 26, 2015	May 1, 2015
Special		December 5, 2015	
2	20	January 4, 2016	January 29, 2016
Special		August 20, 2016	

== Cast and characters ==
=== Main ===
- Megan Lee as Sun Hi, a funky, free-spirited, weird, and self-proclaimed star on the rise. She is the leader of XO-IQ.
- Louriza Tronco as Jodi, a strong, independent, and fierce tomboy. She is the fashionista of XO-IQ. She also has a huge crush on Caleb.
- Erika Tham as Corki, the brains of the group. She is called the bookworm of XO-IQ.
- Dale Whibley as Caleb, the disc jockey of the band. He makes all the songs' beats for XO-IQ.

=== Recurring ===
- John-Alan Slachta as Jared, the vain student president, football quarterback, and ruler of the school.
- Taveeta Szymanowicz as Valerie, the head cheerleader and central antagonist in the series.
- Natalie Ganzhorn as Heather, Valerie's best friend and fellow cheerleader. She later has a crush on Caleb.
- Matt Baram as Mr. Stark, the head of the Theater Arts Department and resident adviser at Mackendrick Prep.
- Karen Holness as Ms. Diona, the principal of Mackendrick Prep.
- Vinson Tran as Linc, a guitarist who clashes with Sun Hi and the group. He is later Sun Hi's love interest.
- Mickey Nguyen as Alex, Jodi's laid-back rival for a fashion internship.
- Tina Jung as Hye Jung Ko, a famous fashion designer who employs Jodi.
- Russell Yuen as Mr. Chang, Corki's strict father who lives in China.
- Alex Eling as Darmala, Alex's roommate who has a crush on Jodi.

== Production ==
DHX Media produced the series. The first season consisted of 20 episodes. In May 2015, it was announced that Make It Pop was renewed for a second season of 20 episodes, which premiered on January 4, 2016. A Christmas special aired on December 5, 2015. A summer special aired on August 20, 2016.

=== Music ===
XO-IQ is the band that was formed in the series by Sun Hi, Jodi, Corki, and Caleb. Vocals for the band's songs were recorded by Megan Lee, Louriza Tronco, Erika Tham, Dale Whibley in Toronto. The band made its first live appearance at the pre-party for the 2015 Nickelodeon Kids' Choice Awards in Los Angeles, where they were introduced at the event by Nick Cannon. The band then performed at the 2015 YTV Summer Beach Bash.

== Broadcast ==
Make It Pop premiered on Nickelodeon in the United Kingdom and Ireland on July 20, 2015. The series debuted on Nickelodeon in Australia and New Zealand on August 10, 2015, and also airs on the free-to-air channel, ABC3, in Australia. In Malaysia, Singapore, and the Philippines, the series debuted on Nickelodeon on August 31, 2015. In Canada, the series debuted on YTV on September 9, 2015. In the United Kingdom, the series debuted on CITV on October 31, 2016.

== Ratings ==
Viewership and ratings per season of Make It Pop
Season	Episodes	First aired		Last aired		Avg. viewers (millions)
Season	Episodes	Date	Viewers (millions)	Date	Viewers (millions)	Avg. viewers (millions)
1	20	March 26, 2015	1.29	May 1, 2015	1.30	1.35
2	20	January 4, 2016	1.46	January 29, 2016	1.07	1.26

== Soundtracks ==
=== Make It Pop, Vol. 1 ===
Make It Pop, Vol. 1

Soundtrack album by XO-IQ
- Released: April 10, 2015
- Recorded: 2014–15
- Genres: Pop, pop rock, EDM, House, Club, R&B
- Length: 29:27
- Labels: DHX-Exchange Productions Inc. (Distributed by Razor & Tie Direct, LLC)

1. "Light It Up" – 3:38
2. "Do It" – 3:10
3. "Now I Am Here (Superstar Mix)" – 3:20
4. "Party Tonight" – 3:16
5. "Make It Pop" – 3:09
6. "Spotlightz" – 2:46
7. "Get It Right" – 3:00
8. "Skillz" – 2:40
9. "My Girls" – 3:28
10. "United (Who We Are)" – 2:20

=== Make It Pop, Vol. 2 ===
Make It Pop, Vol. 2

Soundtrack album by XO-IQ
- Released: April 17, 2015
- Recorded: 2014–15
- Genres: Pop, pop rock, EDM, House music, Club music
- Length: 31:38
- Labels: DHX-Exchange Productions Inc. (Distributed by Razor & Tie Direct, LLC)

1. "Luv 'Em Boys" – 2:20
2. "How I'm Made" – 2:34
3. "Girls @" – 2:50
4. "Do You Know My Name?" – 3:38
5. "Friday Night" – 3:53
6. "What Love Is About?" – 3:00
7. "Party Tonight (Noel Wayne Remix)" – 3:48
8. "Let's Make a Change" – 3:04
9. "The Rules" – 3:23
10. "My Girls (Dr. R Remix)" – 3:28

=== Make It Pop, Vol. 3 ===
Make It Pop, Vol. 3

Soundtrack album by XO-IQ
- Released: April 24, 2015
- Recorded: 2014–15
- Genres: Pop, pop rock, EDM, House, Club
- Length: 32:45
- Labels: DHX-Exchange Productions Inc. (Distributed by Razor & Tie Direct, LLC)

1. Looking for Love – 3:32
2. What Love Is About (DaCapo Remix) – 3:54
3. Superstar – 3:41
4. Skillz (Flange Squad Remix) – 2:43
5. The Rules (Dr. R Remix) – 3:18
6. Now I Am Here (Fashion Mix) – 3:23
7. Do It (Flange Squad Remix) – 3:02
8. Spotlightz (Dr. R Remix) – 2:56
9. Get It Right (The CP Remix) – 2:46
10. Friday Night (St. Thomas Random Remix) – 3:35

=== Make It Pop, Vol. 4 ===
Make It Pop, Vol. 4

Soundtrack album by XO-IQ
- Released: May 1, 2015
- Recorded: 2014–15
- Genres: Pop, pop rock, EDM, House, Club
- Length: 31:37
- Labels: DHX-Exchange Productions Inc. (Distributed by Razor & Tie Direct, LLC)

1. "United (Who We Are) [Flange Squad Remix]" – 2:26
2. "Luv 'Em Boys (Luv 'Em Girls Mix)" (featuring John-Alan Slachta) – 3:15
3. "Superstar (St-Thomas Random Remix)" – 3:44
4. "How I'm Made (Flange Squad Remix)" – 2:39
5. "Let's Make a Change (Shebrock Remix)" – 3:00
6. "Do You Know My Name? (Jodi & Corki Reprise)" – 3:40
7. "Looking for Love (Flange Squad Remix)" – 3:33
8. "Girls @ (St. Thomas Random Remix)" – 2:43
9. "Light It Up (Flange Squad Remix)" – 3:37
10. "Make It Pop (St. Thomas Random Remix)" – 3:00

=== Make It Pop! (Deluxe Edition) ===
Make It Pop! (Deluxe Edition)

Soundtrack album by XO-IQ
- Released: July 24, 2015
- Recorded: 2014–15
- Genres: Pop, pop rock, EDM, House, Club
- Length: 47:10
- Labels: DHX-Exchange Productions Inc. (Distributed by Razor & Tie Direct, LLC)

1. "Make It Pop" – 3:09
2. "Light It Up" – 3:38
3. "Party Tonight" – 3:16
4. "Skillz" – 2:40
5. "Do You Know My Name?" – 3:38
6. "Now I Am Here (Superstar Mix)" – 3:20
7. "Spotlightz" – 2:46
8. "Do It" – 3:10
9. "United (Who We Are)" – 2:20
10. "Get It Right" – 3:00
11. "Luv 'Em Boys" – 2:20
12. "Looking for Love" – 3:32
13. "My Girls" – 3:28
14. "What Love Is About" – 3:00
15. "Friday Night" – 3:53

=== All The Love ===
All the Love

Soundtrack album by XO-IQ
- Released: November 20, 2015
- Recorded: 2015
- Genres: Pop, pop rock, EDM, House, Club
- Length: 7:44
- Labels: DHX-Exchange Productions Inc. (Distributed by Razor & Tie Direct, LLC)

1. "All the Love" – 2:59
2. "Jing Jing Jingle" – 2:40
3. "Deck the Halls" – 2:05

=== Tomorrow Is Ours ===
Tomorrow Is Ours

Soundtrack album by XO-IQ
- Released: December 18, 2015
- Recorded: 2015
- Genres: Pop, pop rock, EDM, House, Club, Hip Hop, Trap
- Length: 46:14
- Labels: DHX-Exchange Productions Inc. (Distributed by Razor & Tie Direct, LLC)

1. "Walk That Walk" – 3:20
2. "Make You the One" – 2:55
3. "Tomorrow Is Ours" – 3:01
4. "We Doin' It" – 3:00
5. "Back to Me" – 3:27
6. "Good Karma" – 3:09
7. "Where Our Hearts Go" – 3:21
8. "You Make It Better" – 3:38
9. "Music's All I Got" – 2:39
10. "Situation Wild" – 2:48
11. "Like a Machine" – 2:56
12. "Whispers" – 2:59
13. "Rock the Show" – 3:07
14. "Jump to It" – 2:50
15. "Gratitude" – 3:04

=== XO-IQ vs. L3 ===
XO-IQ vs. L3

Soundtrack album by XO-IQ & L3
- Released: February 12, 2016
- Recorded: 2015
- Genres: Pop, pop rock, EDM, house, club Cringe Pop, Trap
- Length: 11:28
- Labels: DHX-Exchange Productions Inc. (Distributed by Razor & Tie Direct, LLC)

1. "I Promise You That" (featuring XO-IQ) by L3 – 3:13
2. "Misfits" by XO-IQ – 3:04
3. "No Way" (featuring XO-IQ) by L3 – 2:30
4. "Put It All Together" by XO-IQ – 2:41

=== Video Stars ===
Video Stars

Soundtrack album by XO-IQ
- Released: April 08, 2016
- Genres: Pop, pop rock, EDM, house, club
- Length: 6:00
- Labels: DHX-Exchange Productions Inc. (Distributed by Razor & Tie Direct, LLC)

1. "Video Stars" by XO-IQ - 3:13
2. "Situation Wild (Acoustic)" by XO-IQ - 2:47

=== Summer Splash ===
Summer Splash (Music from the Original TV Series)

Soundtrack album by XO-IQ
- Released: August 19, 2016
- Recorded: 2016
- Genres: Pop, pop rock, EDM, house, club, Hip Hop
- Length: 13:04
- Labels: DHX-Exchange Productions Inc. (Distributed by Razor & Tie Direct, LLC)

1. "Gonna Be Lit" by XO-IQ - 2:56
2. "We Got It" by XO-IQ - 3:07
3. "Summer" by XO-IQ - 2:30
4. "Misfits (Summer Remix)" by XO-IQ - 2:32
5. "Skillz (Summer Remix)" by XO-IQ - 1:59
