= Canadian Made =

2012 Canadian documentary TV series

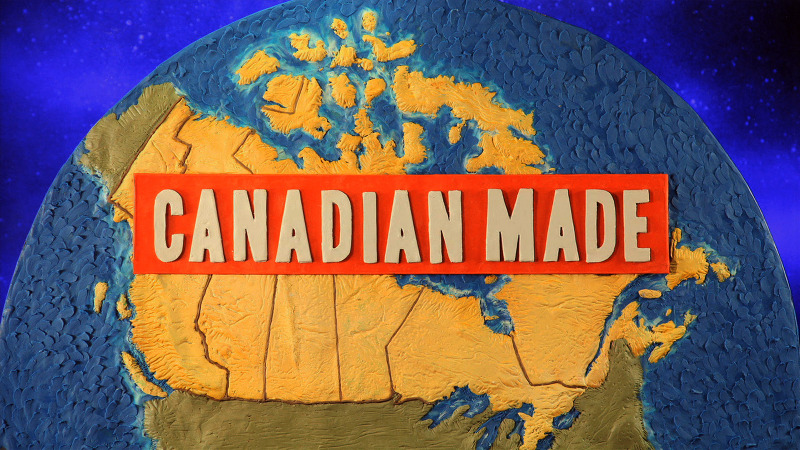
- Primitive Entertainment Series Logo
- Genre: Documentary; Canadian Invention
- Created by: Kevin McMahon
- Directed by: Jody Shapiro (Creative director)
- Narrated by: Rick Miller
- Theme music composer: Kurt Swinghammer
- Country of origin: Canada
- Original language: English
- No. of episodes: 14

Production
- Producer: Kristina McLaughlin
- Running time: 30 minutes

Original release
- Network: History.ca
- Release: June 1, 2012

Canadian Made is a Canadian documentary television series. The series was produced by Primitive Entertainment and initially aired on History Television in 2012. Each 30-minute episode explores Canadian invention, innovation or discovery. The series initially aired June 1, 2012, and ran for one season with 14 episodes. It was narrated by Canadian actor, comedian, playwright Rick Miller.

== Episodes ==
- Episode 1: Clothing Revolutions: The Wonderbra, lumberjack shirt and gas mask (written and directed by David New)
- Episode 2: Time Shifting: Standard time, key-frame animation and the instant replay (written and directed by David New)
- Episode 3: Snow Crossings: Snow shoes, snowmobile, snow plows and puck road sensor (written and directed by Sean Wainsteim)
- Episode 4: Space Explorations: the Canadarm, the Dextre robot and LIDAR (written and directed by David New)
- Episode 5: Cultural Revolutions: Superman, electronic music (electronic sackbut) and Trivial Pursuit (written and directed by Sean Wainsteim)
- Episode 6: Sweet Treats: Maple syrup, ginger ale and the chocolate bar (written and directed by Sean Wainsteim)
- Episode 7: Game Gear: Lacrosse stick, hockey stick and the goalie mask (written and directed by Ian Ross MacDonald)
- Episode 8: Experimental Vehicles: The JetLev jet pack, Mosquito Ultralight helicopter and Uno dicycle (written and directed by Buffy Childerhose)
- Episode 9: Medical Breakthroughs: The heart pacemaker, Bliss symbolics and discovery of stem cells (written and directed by Dylan Reibling)
- Episode 10: Imperviousness: The quinzhee, Canada Goose parka and the Exo-Suit (written and directed by Michael Morrow)
- Episode 11: Working Watercraft: The kayak, Sawfish harvester and Hibernia oil platform (written and directed by Su Rynard)
- Episode 12: Brilliant Amenities: The Robertson screw, plastic garbage bag and bear-proof trash bin (written and directed by Annie Bradley)
- Episode 13: Foresting: Totem poles, newsprint (Charles Fenerty) and the purpose-built water bomber (Canadair CL-215) (written and directed by Buffy Childerhose)
- Episode 14: Revolutionary Perspectives: Electron microscope, telerobotic surgery, NEPTUNE underwater observatory (written and directed by Dylan Reibling)

== Awards ==
- Platimun Award (Animation) Pixie Awards, 2011
- Gold Award (Use of Effects) Pixie Awards, 2011
