= 8dayz =

Single by Megan Lee featuring Yong Jun-hyung
- Released: May 15, 2014
- Genre: K-pop, country
- Length: 3:26 (Korean); 3:16 (English)
- Label: SOULS#OP, LOEN
- Songwriters: Andreas Bärtels (composition/English lyrics); Rüdger Schramm (composition); Megan Lee (English lyrics); Kim Tae-woo (Korean lyrics); Yong Jun-hyung (Korean rap lyrics)
- Producer: Kim Tae-woo (executive)

"8dayz" (read as "8 Days") is the official debut single of YouTube sensation and Birth of a Great Star contestant Megan Lee, featuring boy band Beast's Yong Jun-hyung. The song was written by Megan Lee and singer Kim Tae-woo with music by German songwriters Andreas Bärtels and Rüdger Schramm from Jam Factory. The single was released in Korean and English versions on May 15, 2014.

== Music video ==
The video begins with Lee waking up in the morning, but then being too lazy to get up from her bed. Some hands later manage to wake her up. Then there are scenes from inside a room (Megan singing with a masked back-up band) and a garden (Megan Lee only). Megan later danced to the tune of the song with back-up dancers from two rooms of the house.

Yong Jun-hyung appeared in the night party and rapped with Megan Lee singing in the background. In the end, a picture of Megan and Junhyung with the dancers is seen inside a picture frame, while Megan was sleeping. The clock then announced the time: 12:00 (midnight).

In the English version, the Junhyung scene is not included.

The Korean version premiered on Mnet TV on April 30. The English version premiered on the same channel on May 5.

== Track listing ==
- Digital download
1. "8dayz" (featuring Yong Jun-hyung of BEAST) - 3:26
2. "8dayz" (English version, solo) - 3:16
- Digital download (iTunes)
1. "8dayz" (featuring Yong Jun-hyung of BEAST) - 3:26
2. "8dayz" (instrumental) - 3:16

== Personnel ==
Musicians

- Megan Lee - main vocals, banjo, English lyrics
- Yong Jun-hyung - rap vocals, Korean rap lyrics

Additional personnel

- Andreas Bärtels (Jam Factory) - composition, English lyrics
- Rüdger Schramm (Jam Factory) - composition
- Kim Tae-woo - Korean lyrics, producer

== Charts ==
Chart	Peak position
Gaon Singles Chart	63
Billboard K-Pop Hot 100	82

== Release history ==
Country	Date	Format	Label
South Korea	May 15, 2014	Digital download	Soul Shop Entertainment; LOEN Entertainment
