= Drinkwater (film) =

- Theatrical poster
- Directed by: Stephen Campanelli
- Written by: Luke Fraser; Edward McDonald
- Produced by: Graham Fraser; Dennis Swartman
- Starring: Daniel Doheny; Eric McCormack; Louriza Tronco
- Cinematography: Peter Wilke
- Edited by: Christopher A. Smith
- Music by: Rich Walters
- Production company: Suitcase Charlie Films
- Release date: September 25, 2021 (CIFF)
- Running time: 112 minutes
- Country: Canada
- Language: English

Drinkwater is a 2021 Canadian coming-of-age comedy film, directed by Stephen Campanelli. The film stars Daniel Doheny as Mike Drinkwater, a teenager living in Penticton, British Columbia, with his father Hank (Eric McCormack); an outsider because his father does not hold down a steady job and instead lives solely off the proceeds of insurance fraud schemes, Mike finds his life transformed when he befriends Wallace (Louriza Tronco), a young woman who moves into the house next door.

The film's cast also includes Jordan Burtchett, Alex Zahara, Linda Darlow, Bob Frazer, Naika Toussaint, Chloe Babcook, Vincent Cheng, Jana Benoit, Lisa Huynh, Mavourneen Varcoe-Ryan, Beth Fotheringham, David Allan Pearson, Matt Shay, Quinn Hubscher, and Graham Fraser.

The film premiered at the 2021 Calgary International Film Festival, where it won the Audience Choice Award for Best Canadian Narrative Film. It was subsequently screened at the 2021 Whistler Film Festival, where it won the Audience Award.

Doheny won the Vancouver Film Critics Circle award for Best Actor in a Canadian Film at the Vancouver Film Critics Circle Awards 2021, and McCormack was nominated for Best Supporting Actor in a Canadian Film.
