= Underwater logging =

Process of harvesting trees that are submerged under water

Underwater logging is the process of logging trees from underwater forests. When artificial reservoirs and dams are built, large areas of forest are often inundated; although the trees die, the wood is often preserved. The trees can then be felled using special underwater machinery and floated up to the surface. One such machine is the sawfish harvester. There is an ongoing debate to determine whether or not underwater logging is a sustainable practice and if it is more environmentally sustainable than traditional logging.

Underwater logging has been introduced in select locations around the world, including Ghana's Lake Volta, the largest reservoir by surface area in the world.

A related form of logging consists of salvaging logs which loggers have abandoned after they became waterlogged and sank. This activity can be quite profitable, since the prime "targets" are decades-old trees of a size and species difficult or impossible to find in their natural habitat.

== History ==
Rivers were a main method of transportation in the logging industry in the 19th and early 20th centuries in the United States. In the spring, logs were floated down waterways, especially those surrounding the Great Lakes and Maine, to transport them to mills downriver. Logs with a higher density than the density of water would sink. Other logs would get caught in jams, sloughs, or floods, and become lodged in the riverbed. Such logs were often known as "sinkers" or "deadheads." Loggers attempted to reduce the number of logs which remained in the river in order to maximize profits, but some losses were inevitable. Logs with legible log marks were sometimes returned to their owners.

Underwater logs are safe from many of the forces which cause decomposition, including fungi. Log salvage operations began in the early 20th century across the United States. John Cayford and Ronald Scott's book Underwater Logging describes the process and prospects for retrieving sunken wood from American waterways, known as salvage logging.

Salvage logging differs from underwater logging. Salvage logging recovers full-sized logs that were lost during past logging expeditions. Underwater logging uses new technology to cut down drowned trees that have been lost due to rising water levels or artificial reservoirs.

== Logging methods ==
=== Remote controlled vehicle ===
One method of unearthing sunken trees is by sending a remotely operated underwater vehicle, like a sawfish harvester, underwater to fell the trees. The vehicle is controlled by a cable that sends electricity and control inputs to the vessel which sends back a video feed for the operator. The operator sends inputs from a control panel on a barge. When a tree is found the Sawfish attaches and inflates a flotation device to it so that after the tree is cut it immediately rises to the surface for extraction from the water.

=== Attaching buoys ===
Attaching buoys is one of the main processes by which underwater logs are salvaged from the bottom of lakes and rivers. First, a scuba-diver must locate the sunken logs in the water, searching from about three feet from the bottom of the lake or river. Then, a buoy is placed around the log about three feet from its back. From there, a boat uses a gaff hook to catch the buoys and pulls the log close enough to the boat where the crew is able to tie the logs close to the side of the boat. This process repeats itself until the boat is filled to its capacity, after which the expedition is completed, and crew must return to base before harvesting any additional logs.

=== Floating logs ===
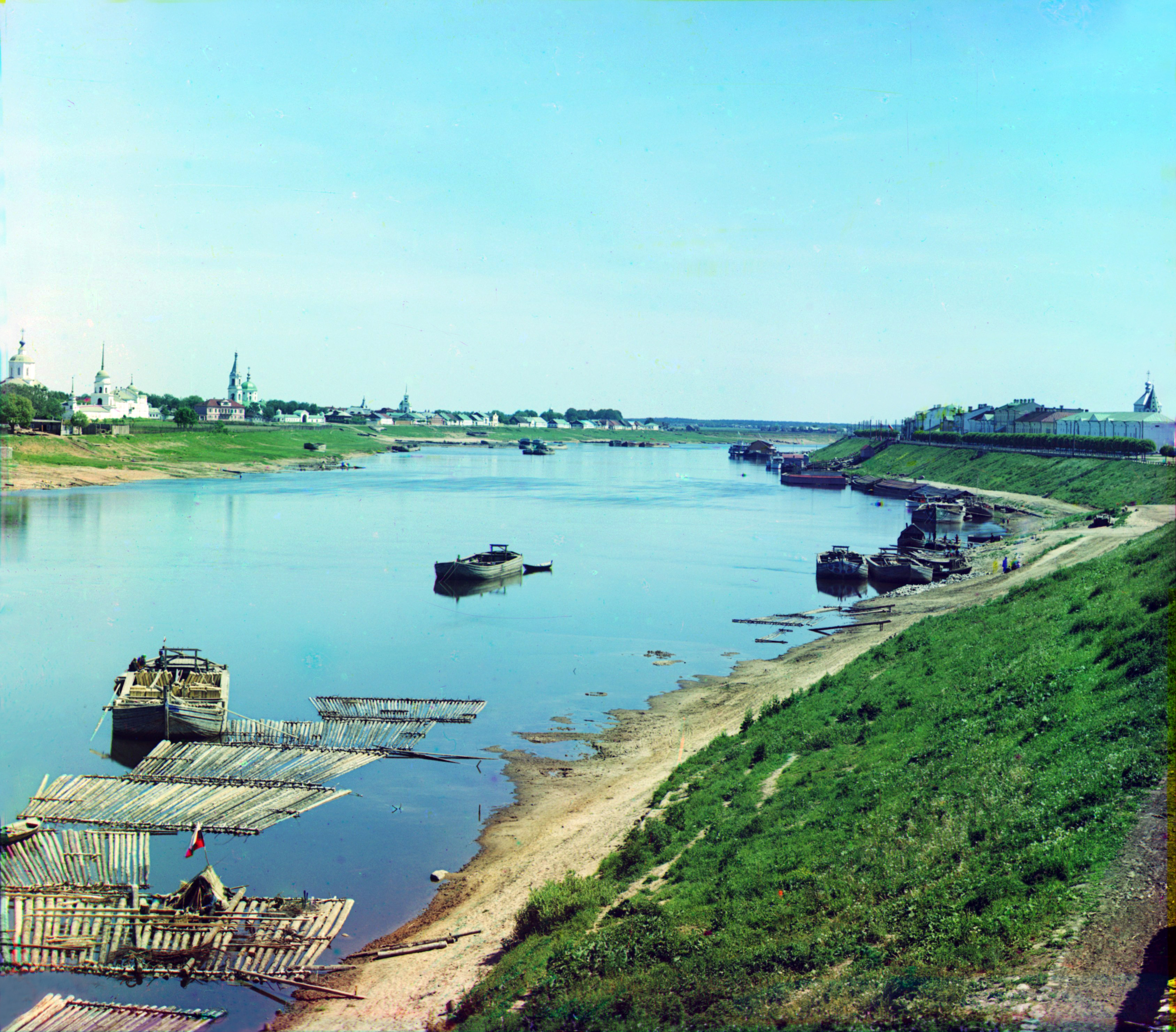
Log transportation method along rivers

In the case of floating logs that have not been drowned but may have been separated from initial logging routes and stuck on the banks of rivers and lakes, a new process is utilized. Here, truck inner tubes are completely deflated so that a diver can slip them over the logs. After this occurs and once the tubes are securely in place, a hookah compressor and a low-pressure hose re-inflates them so that they form a tight grip around the floating logs. This process gives the logs more buoyancy and gives loggers easier access points to harvest them. As many tubes that are needed are used to float the logs.

== Environmental impacts ==
=== Marine pollution ===
Ships are polluting both in the marine environment and in the atmosphere, and although it is difficult to estimate the magnitude of the problem, there is no uncertainty that increased usage of such ships will increase pollution. As the underwater logging industry becomes more popular and profitable, this increased usage will occur. The process of underwater logging itself will also have a negative impact on the environment, as the logs themselves add weight to the ships, forcing said ships to work harder and use more time and energy to transport their cargo. In terms of transportation, cargo ships transport the logs across the water. They use an immense amount of ballast water, which can have negative effects on the environment. When the ships reach the mills they empty the water, "Ballast water discharge typically contains a variety of biological materials, including plants, animals, viruses, and bacteria". Dumping the ballast can change the aquatic ecosystems and even make the water undrinkable.

=== Accidents ===
Accidents related to this industry usually result in the release of oil and other resources, as these spills are difficult to maintain due to the fluidity of lakes and rivers. What this means is that the potential for collateral damage is large, both for marine and human life, because toxic resources such as oil can contaminate surrounding ecosystems. It is necessary, therefore, to exercise caution when partaking in processes, such as underwater logging, that require the use of potentially harmful resources.

=== Deforestation ===
Because the underwater logging process is essentially retrieving drowned logs and sunken trees that were already lost in previous logging expeditions, the logs are considered "rediscovered wood." Because underwater logging is retrieving "rediscovered wood," this has a positive impact on the forestry industry, as it reduces the need to log in land forests. In addition, when logging on land logging companies have to create new roads to get to higher quality wood. Road building is eliminated with underwater logging because the transportation paths across the rivers already exist.

=== Potential erosion of lakes and rivers ===
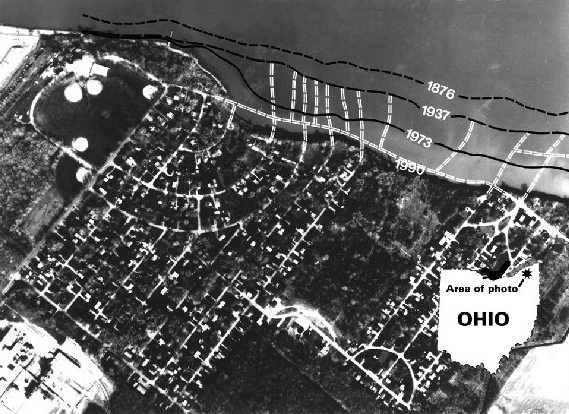
Effects of erosion along Lake Erie

As some of these logs have been lost for upwards of a few decades, the local environment has inevitably grown and developed around said logs. Removing these logs, which provide structural support to a variety of these ecosystems, could result in erosion of the lakes and rivers that would change the structure and potentially degrade these bodies of water.

=== Marine life ===
Some of the logs that are retrieved have been underwater for upwards of a few decades, meaning local marine life will have formed their habitats around these drowned logs. These logs provide substantial structural support for these ecosystems, and removing them would inevitably destroy said natural habitats. Boats and crew members of underwater logging fleets can stir up and degrade the local ecosystems.

== Sustainability ==
Nature & Faune magazine describes the process of underwater logging's sustainability impact. The hydroelectric dam in Ghana built in Akosombo submerges forests of timber logs. The Clark Sustainable Resource Developments uses SHARC ROV technology to keep the roots of the trees intact not to disturb the lake bottom or disturb pollutants. After, they put canopies and buttresses to create artificial fish reefs and educated locals about fishing practices. Lastly, they can cut up to 25 meters (82 ft) below the lakes surface, which creates a depth sufficient to support routes for transportation lake vessels. This process was awarded for being sustainable by avoiding deforestation and making artificial reefs to maintain the current aquatic ecosystem.
