= I Woke Up a Vampire =

Fantasy comedy television series

- Genre: Fantasy comedy Parody
- Created by: Thomas W. Lynch
- Starring: Kaileen Angelic Chang; Niko Ceci; Zebastin Borjeau; Ana Araujo; Aaliyah Cinello; Jayd Deroché; Kris Siddiqi; Delia Lisette Chambers
- Music by: Raney Shockne; Thomas W. Lynch
- Composer: Raney Shockne
- Countries of origin: United States; Canada
- Original language: English
- No. of seasons: 2
- No. of episodes: 16

Production
- Executive producers: Stephanie Betts; Angela Boudreault; Anne Loi; Josh Schwartz; Thomas W. Lynch
- Producer: Sherry King
- Production locations: Toronto, Ontario; Romania
- Camera setup: Single-camera
- Running time: 23–27 minutes
- Production companies: Tom Lynch Company; WildBrain

Original release
- Network: Family Channel (Canada); Netflix (United States)
- Release: May 5 – September 1, 2023

I Woke Up a Vampire is a fantasy comedy television series created by Thomas W. Lynch for the Family Channel and Netflix and a parody of Vampire literature. The series premiered on May 5, 2023.

== Synopsis ==
On her 13th birthday, Carmie discovers that she's half-human, half-vampire – and that mythical powers make middle school way more complicated. Then, when she finds out a hunter is coming for her, things get even more out of hand!

== Characters ==
=== Main characters ===
- Kaileen Angelic Chang as Carmela "Carmie" Henley, a blended vampling (half vampire half human)
- Niko Ceci as Kev Gardner, Carmie's friend.
- Zebastin Borjeau as Dylan Helsing, a hunter who works for the Collector in season 1.
- Kris Siddiqi as the Collector, a mystic gorgon.
- Jayd Deroche as Aiden Henley, Carmie's adoptive brother.
- Delia Lisette Chambers as Jayden Henley, Carmie's adoptive sister.
- Aaliyah Cinello as Madison Spencer, a blended werewolf.
- Charlotte Legault as the Shapeshifter, a vampire who is Carmie's biological mother.
- Will Coombs as Tristan, a cunning warrior fairy who appears in Season 2. He despises and wants to eradicate the human race.

=== Supporting characters ===
- Rainbow Sun Francks as Bill Henley
- Ipsita Paul as Aasha Henley
- Jenni Burke as Elaina Johnson
- Ana Araujo as Leanna Timmons
- Alyssa Hidalgo as Jewel, the Collector's Daughter

== Episodes ==
First aired in 1 season of 16 episodes on Family Channel, Netflix then chose to separate them into 2 seasons of 8 episodes each. The second season was released in the year 2024.

No. overall	No. in season	Title	Directed by	Written by	Canadian air date	Netflix	
1	1	"Vampire!!!!!"	Warren P. Sonoda	Thomas W. Lynch	May 5, 2023	October 17, 2023	TBA
2	2	"Power Play"	Warren P. Sonoda	Renuka Singh	May 12, 2023	October 17, 2023	TBA
3	3	"Mirror, Mirror"	Michael McGowan	Ryan Devlin Lynch	May 19, 2023	October 17, 2023	TBA
4	4	"Siblings"	Michael McGowan	Veronika Paz	May 26, 2023	October 17, 2023	TBA
5	5	"Family Tree"	Warren P. Sonoda	Thomas Comway	June 2, 2023	October 17, 2023	TBA
6	6	"Creature Feature"	Warren P. Sonoda	Carley DeNure	June 9, 2023	October 17, 2023	TBA
7	7	"Uncovered"	Michael McGowan	Ryan Devlin Lynch	June 16, 2023	October 17, 2023	TBA
8	8	"The Musical"	Michael McGowan	Thomas W. Lynch	June 23, 2023	October 17, 2023	TBA
9	9	"My People"	Lisa Rose Snow	Unknown	July 7, 2023	April 4, 2024	TBA
10	10	"Track and Steal"	Lisa Rose Snow	Unknown	July 14, 2023	April 4, 2024	TBA
11	11	"The Dance"	Unknown	Unknown	July 21, 2023	April 4, 2024	TBA
12	12	"Wild and Free"	Unknown	Unknown	July 28, 2023	April 4, 2024	TBA
13	13	"Secrets and Lies"	Unknown	Unknown	August 11, 2023	April 4, 2024	TBA
14	14	"Vamptitude"	Unknown	Unknown	August 18, 2023	April 4, 2024	TBA
15	15	"Fan Con"	Unknown	Laura Carrione	August 25, 2023	April 4, 2024	TBA
16	16	"Family Reunion"	Unknown	Unknown	September 1, 2023	April 4, 2024	TBA

== Production ==
The show's creator unveiled a new series in partnership with Netflix as part of its slate of original live-action content for Family Channel.

Netflix split up the first season into two halves. The first released on October 18, 2023 and the second half (released as season 2) released on April 4, 2024.

== Reception ==
On Decider.com said "adults tend to know what to expect from kid-oriented comedies with teens or tweens. Lots of fast-talking, precocious kids, with some over-the-top gags. But they also expect a story full of friends, family and at least some sort of interesting backstory for the characters. The main character in a new Netflix tween series certainly has that interesting backstory."

Shabnam Jahan said in LeisureByte: "Netflix has a special way of introducing new teen series, and they never fail to impress. They really know how to grab the audience's attention, and this show is no exception. The story is fascinating; it revolves around a teenage girl who has no idea about her true identity until she turns thirteen. Suddenly, her world is completely turned upside down when she learns that she's half human and half vampire. What's great about this show is that it tackles universal themes, making it more than just a supernatural thriller. It's a relatable coming-of-age story that resonates with a wide range of viewers".
