= EZI =

American actress and musician

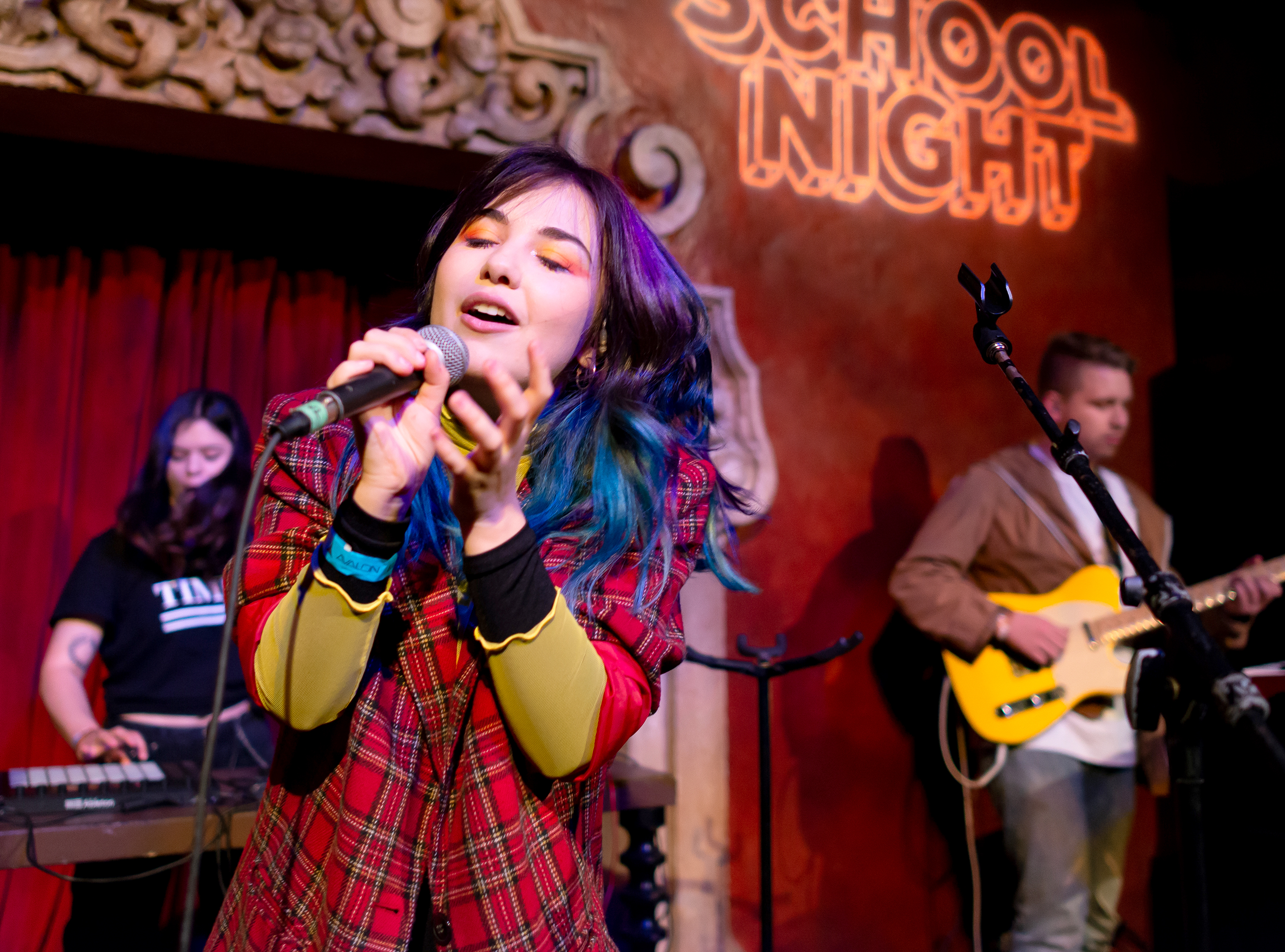
- EZI performing in Los Angeles in 2018
- Born: Esther Zyskind; June 8, 2001 (age 24)
- Other names: Esther Zynn, EZI
- Occupations: Actress; musician
- Website: eziofficial.com

Esther Zyskind (born June 8, 2001), known professionally as EZI and Esther Zynn, is an American singer, songwriter and actress.

Before releasing music, EZI starred in the 2016 Nickelodeon television series The Other Kingdom. Shortly after, EZI became the face of Steve Madden's "Madden Girl" campaign and was the first artist to sign to Madden's independent record label 5Towns Records.

Her single "Dancing in a Room" from her 2018 debut EP Afraid of the Dark hit 32 on the Billboard US dance charts and peaked at #13. To date, the EP has accumulated over 30 million streams independently. EZI's music has also been featured in several TV shows & movies including the Netflix original series Atypical.

== Personal life ==
EZI was born in Long Island, New York to Jewish immigrant parents from Moscow. Her father was a classically trained musician, and she pursued music as a hobby in her childhood.

== Filmography ==
Year	Title	Role	Notes
2011	Good Intentions	Lily	Short film
2013	All My Children	Girl #2	Episode: "Episode #1.5"
2014	Inside Amy Schumer	Cheerleader	Episode: "I'm So Bad"
2015	Too Cool For School	Girl	Short film
2015	One Bad Choice	Lisa	Episode: "Kaitlyn Hunt"
2015	Some of Us Had Been Threatening Our Friend Colby	Lucy	Short film
2016	Ace the Case	Jill	
2016	Natural Selection	Angela Wardin	
2016	The Other Kingdom	Princess Astral	20 episodes, credited as Esther Zynn
2016	Piper's Picks TV	Self - Guest	Episode: "The Other Kingdom Stars Esther Zynn, Callan Potter, Celina Martin & Taylor Adams Talk Faries and Dating!", credited as Esther Zynn
2018	Rooftops		Assistant costume designer, credited as Esther Zynn
2020	EZI: not going down	EZI	Music video, credited as EZI
2020	After We Collided		Song: "Afraid of the Dark", writer and performer
2025	The Snare		

== Discography ==
=== Studio albums ===
- Into Your Power, Into the Light (2024)

=== EPs ===
- Afraid of the Dark (2018)
- In Between Everything (2019)
- Isolation Demos (2021)
- Into Your Power (2024)
- Into Your Power, Into the Light (String Quintent Versions) (2024)
