= 100 Deeds for Eddie McDowd =

Television sitcom created for Nickelodeon

- Created by: Steven H. Berman; Mitchel Katlin; Nat Bernstein
- Starring: Brandon Gilberstadt; Morgan Kibby; Melanee Murray; Catherine MacNeal; William Francis McGuire
- Voices of: Seth Green; Jason Hervey
- Opening theme: "You Got Me", performed by The Hippos (season 1) "Who Let the Dogs Out" performed by Baha Men (season 2–3)
- Composer: Andrew R. Powell
- Countries of origin: United States; Canada
- No. of seasons: 3
- No. of episodes: 40 (list of episodes)

Production
- Executive producers: Thomas W. Lynch; John D. Lynch; Steven H. Berman; Jay Firestone (S2–3); Adam Haight (S2–3)
- Producers: Robert C. Mora (S1); Mike Rubiner (S2–3); Greg A. Hampson (S2–3)
- Camera setup: Single-camera
- Running time: 22–24 minutes
- Production companies: Lynch Entertainment; Fireworks Entertainment; Lincoln Field Productions; Nickelodeon Productions

Original release
- Network: Nickelodeon
- Release: October 16, 1999 – April 21, 2002

100 Deeds for Eddie McDowd is a teen sitcom created for Nickelodeon by Steven H. Berman, Mitchel Katlin, and Nat Bernstein. The series ran for three seasons, premiering on October 16, 1999, and airing its final episode on April 21, 2002.

== Plot ==
I'm Eddie McDowd, I'm a dog, and I talk. I used to be a kid, a bad kid, but then I messed with the wrong guy. ... He turned me into a dog. Can you believe this? That freak turned me into a dog! To be a kid again I have to do 100 good deeds, and the only person who can hear me talk is the last person I picked on. Now I'm living with this kid and his family. They love me, but they treat me like a dog.

— Eddie McDowd, in the opening title sequence after the pilot

Eddie McDowd (Jason Dohring) is considered to be a schoolyard bully by his peers. McDowd considers himself very attractive and powerful and so he bullies others without mercy. One day, while bullying a kid after school, he is caught by a kind of mystical man. He tells McDowd that due to his bullying he will be punished for his wrongdoings by living life as a dog, and that in order to be restored as a human, he has to do 100 good deeds for others. Besides The Drifter, the only one who can hear him talk is Justin Taylor, the last kid he bullied. At first, the two are firmly against the idea, but McDowd realizes that he must work alongside Justin and his family to finish his good deeds. Every time Eddie performs a good deed, the Drifter appears with a creatively presented number stating the remaining deeds he has left. Occasionally, the Drifter takes away one of his deeds when Eddie misbehaves.

== Episodes ==
Season	Episodes	Originally released	
Season	Episodes	First released	Last released
1	20	October 16, 1999	December 5, 2000
2	12	January 27, 2001	April 14, 2001
3	8	March 3, 2002	April 21, 2002

== Characters ==
=== Main ===
- Edward "Eddie" McDowd (played by Jason Dohring as a human and John Allan at 12; played "Rowdy" as a dog; voiced by Seth Green in season 1, and Jason Hervey in seasons 2–3) – Eddie is a 17-year-old bully from the southwest who was turned into an Australian Shepherd/Siberian Husky mix by the Drifter for his wrongdoings and can only be restored to human form if he does 100 good deeds. Besides the Drifter, the only other person who can hear him talk is Justin Taylor (who was the last kid that he bullied). It is explained by the Drifter in a later episode that should this happen, neither Justin nor Eddie's family will outright remember their experiences (though Eddie will still be a better person for it).
- Justin Taylor (played by Brandon Gilberstadt) – The last kid Eddie had picked on and the only one who can hear him talk in his dog form. He assists Eddie into doing the good deeds to restore Eddie to human.
- Gwen Taylor (played by Morgan Kibby) – Justin's sister. She's very vain and popular; all the boys like her, especially her next door neighbor Spike Cipriano who she constantly rejects.
- Tori Sloan (played by Melanee Murray) – A foreign exchange student from England who switched families with Gwen in season 2
- Lisa Taylor (played by Catherine MacNeal) – Justin's mother who works as a party planner.
- Doug Taylor (played by William Francis McGuire) – Justin's father who works as a mailman.

=== Supporting ===
- Sariffa Chung (played by Brenda Song) – Justin's best friend
- The Drifter (played by Richard Moll) – A mystical person who was responsible for casting the spell that transformed Eddie into an Australian Shepherd/Siberian Husky mix and will only change him back once he has done 100 good deeds. He describes himself to be the embodiment of love, compassion, and tenderness and can do actions that are able to override and break the laws of nature. The Drifter speaks in rhymes and is able to take the form of different living things. He often appears in different forms to give Eddie advice on how to do good deeds.
- Spike Cipriano (played by Danny Tamberelli) – The Taylor's next-door neighbor who goes to the same school as Justin and Gwen. He has a huge crush on Gwen and tries to get her to be his girlfriend.
- Flaco (played by Josh Hammond) – Eddie's old bullying buddy who also picks on Justin as he takes Eddie's place as the school bully.
- Agt. Elizabeth Marcus/Dog Catcher (played by Julie Marcus)
- Caesar (voiced by David Lander) – A Boston Terrier that befriends Eddie
- Salvatore/Sal/Sally (voiced by Joe Piscopo) – A pug that's Eddie's friend and next-door neighbor; Piscopo also portrays Salvatore's owner Mr. Watt.
- Gigi (voiced by Alyson Hannigan) – A White Cream Pomeranian that Eddie is often smitten with. She speaks with a French accent.

== Cancellation ==
The series was cancelled in the United States due to declining ratings in the spring of 2002 after 40 episodes with 60 deeds left.
