= Dale Whibley =

Canadian actor (born 1997)

- Born: Dale Austin Whibley; October 4, 1997 (age 28); Toronto, Ontario, Canada
- Occupation: Actor
- Years active: 2012–present

Dale Austin Whibley (born October 4, 1997) is a Canadian actor. He gained attention in 2015 for appearing in the Nickelodeon musical comedy Make It Pop and later he starred in the Netflix slasher film There's Someone Inside Your House (2021).

== Early life ==
Dale Austin Whibley was born on October 4, 1997, in Toronto, and grew up in the city Barrie. At the age of five, Whibley began his acting career in television commercials.

== Career ==
Whibley made his television debut on an episode of the sitcom Life with Boys, playing the role of Connor McGill. This was followed by a minor role in the documentary series Canadian Made. In 2013, Whibley had a recurring role in the teen drama Degrassi: The Next Generation, in which he played Neil Martin. The following year, he had a guest role on the comedy series Max & Shred. In 2015, he was cast in the main role in the Nickelodeon musical comedy Make It Pop, in which he played Caleb Davis, the disc jockey of the band XO-IQ. Also in 2015, Whibley made his feature film debut in a minor role in the independent comedy-drama Len and Company directed by Tim Godsall and Katie Knight.

In 2018, he had a guest role in the second season of the Audience Network's drama Ice as the handsome high school senior Braxton. In 2019, Whibley joined the fifth season of the fantasy comedy-drama series Good Witch in a recurring role as Luke Williams.

In 2021, Whibley played the role of Lucas Gruzinsky in the Disney+ sports comedy-drama Big Shot. That same year, he starred as Zachariah "Zach" Sandford in Patrick Brice's There's Someone Inside Your House.

== Filmography ==
Key
†	Denotes films that have not yet been released

=== Film ===
Year	Title	Role	Notes
2015	Len and Company	Derek Coulter	
2019	Dance Together	Noah	
2021	There's Someone Inside Your House	Zachariah "Zach" Sandford	
2023	Fitting In	Chad	
2025	Fear Street: Prom Queen	Jimmy	

=== Television ===
Year	Title	Role	Notes
2012	Life with Boys	Connor McGill	Episode: "Hitting the Breaks with Boys"
2012	Canadian Made	Lil Boy Bombardier	Episode: "Snow Crossing"
2013–2014	Degrassi: The Next Generation	Neil Martin	Guest role; 6 episodes
2014–2015	Max & Shred	Yuud Nuuderuud	Guest role; 2 episodes
2015–2016	Make It Pop	Caleb Davis	Main role
2016	The Other Kingdom	Belac	Episode: "Get a Job"
2016	I'll Be Home for Christmas	Luke Tate	Television film
2016	Sound of Christmas	Jordan Crawford	Television film
2017	Shadowhunters	Teen Jace Herondale	Episode: "Parabatai Lost"
2017	The Christmas Cure	Kyle Turner	Television film
2017, 2024	Murdoch Mysteries	Gerald Jarvis / Ross Campbell	2 episodes
2018	Ice	Braxton	Guest role; 3 episodes
2019	Blood & Treasure	Teen Danny McNamara	Episode: "Return of the Queen"
2019	Good Witch	Luke Williams	Recurring role; 6 episodes
2019	The Christmas Chalet	Andrew	Television film
2020	October Faction	Jack	Episode: "The Horror Out of Time"
2020	Transplant	Ethan	Episode: "Your Secrets Can Kill You"
2020	American Housewife	Conner	Guest role; 2 episodes
2021	Christmas Movie Magic	Stan	Television film
2021–2022	Big Shot	Lucas Gruzinsky	Recurring role; 9 episodes
2023	Luckless in Love	Dirk	Television film
2023	Gray	Ben Gray	Guest role; 3 episodes
2025–2026	The Way Home	Max Goodwin	Recurring role; 10 episodes
2025	Doc	Seth Harper	Episode: "Something to Prove"
2026	Star Trek: Starfleet Academy	Kyle Jokovich	Recurring role; 4 episodes

== Awards and nominations ==
Year	Award	Category	Work	Result	Ref.
2015	Joey Awards	Best Actor in a TV Comedy Leading Role	Make It Pop	Nominated	
2015	Joey Awards	Best Young Ensemble in a TV Series	Make It Pop	Nominated	
