= Life with Boys =

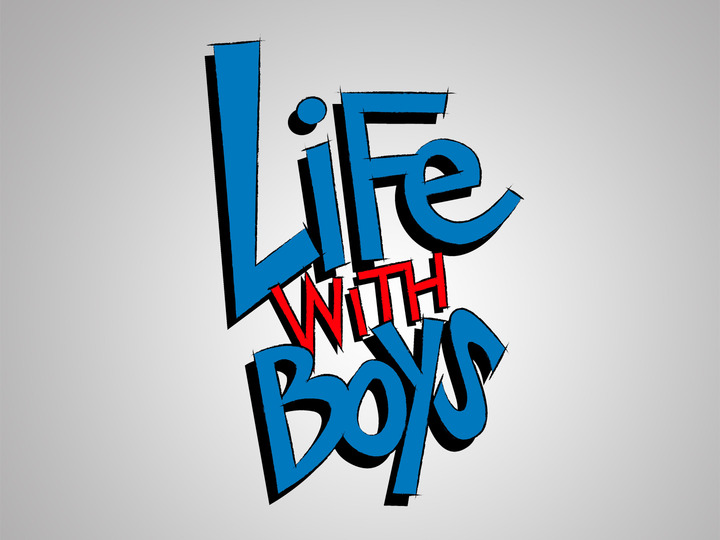
- Created by: Michael Poryes
- Directed by: Stefan Scaini; Steve Wright
- Starring: Torri Webster; Madison Pettis; Nathan McLeod; Michael Murphy; Jake Goodman; Sandy Jobin-Bevans
- Opening theme: "A Wonderful Life" performed by Katia Zuccarelli and Torri Webster
- Ending theme: "A Wonderful Life" (reprise)
- Composers: Craig McConnell and Justin Forsley
- Country of origin: Canada
- Original language: English
- No. of seasons: 2
- No. of episodes: 40 (list of episodes)

Production
- Executive producers: Michael Poryes; Helen Lebeau; Jocelyn Hamilton; Tracey Dodokin; Steven Bawol; Steven Peterman; Doug Murphy; Douglas Lieblein (season 2); Colin Bohm (season 2)
- Producer: Jim Corston
- Editor: Jeff Geisel
- Running time: 22-42 minutes
- Production companies: Nelvana; Helion Pictures

Original release
- Network: YTV
- Release: September 9, 2011 – August 27, 2013

Life with Boys is a Canadian teen sitcom that aired in Canada on YTV from September 9, 2011 through August 27, 2013. The sitcom stars Torri Webster, Madison Pettis, Nathan McLeod, Michael Murphy, Jake Goodman, and Sandy Jobin-Bevans. The show follows Tess Foster (Webster) as she copes with living in a home with just boys: her widowed father Jack (Jobin-Bevans) and Gabe (McLeod), Spencer (Goodman), and Sam (Murphy), who are her brothers. With the help of her best friend Allie (Pettis), she pulls through. Life with Boys is created by Michael Poryes, who also co-created Hannah Montana and That's So Raven.

Life with Boys was renewed for a second season. Shooting started on September 4, 2012, in Toronto, Ontario. On February 6, 2013, the series premiered on the American network TeenNick. The show was not renewed for a third season and was cancelled after two seasons.

== Premise ==
Set in Westfield, New Jersey, the series centers around Tess Foster as she navigates her way through the turmoil of teen life while living at home with her widowed, overprotective dad and three brothers. Although Tess admires the four important men in her life, they do have four totally different perspectives. Despite the shortcomings of being the only girl in a male household, the boys can sometimes offer solid advice. Whether it's building up the courage to talk to a boy, dealing with an obnoxious one, or coping with the repercussions of being the only girl on the boys' wrestling team, Life with Boys sheds a comedic light on many of life's difficult moments.

== Characters ==
=== Main characters ===
(L-R) Jake Goodman, Nathan McLeod, Torri Webster, Michael Murphy and Madison Pettis

- Tess Foster (Torri Webster) is 14 years old and the only girl in a house of all boys. She is the only girl on her school's wrestling team, and sometimes deals with what comes with that. Her best friend is Allie and most of the shenanigans she gets into involve her. Tess sometimes feels like she is thrown under the bus in her house full of brothers, but at the end of the day loves them even though she feels overwhelmed. Tess is sometimes referred to as the "BoyGirl Freak" by her peers because of her interest in sports. She also is a member of the Mathletes.
- Allie Brooks (Madison Pettis) is Tess's best friend, a bright and popular cheerleader who loves fashion and is a typical girly girl. She's a fixture at the Foster household, despite never quite understanding how Tess can survive life in a house full of boys. However, sometimes she can be a little unsupportive towards the problems Tess faces. She often spends her Christmas holiday in Tahiti and in Italy. She is liked by Sam and does like Sam but not in the same way.
- Gabriel "Gabe" Foster (Nathan McLeod) is Tess' 16-year-old brother and the oldest of the Foster siblings and knows how to get his way. Gabe is one of the stereotypical boy heartthrobs of high school who is kind of a player when it comes to girls, since he usually dates more than one girl at a time. He dislikes "caring" for his younger siblings yet shows a liking for Spencer.

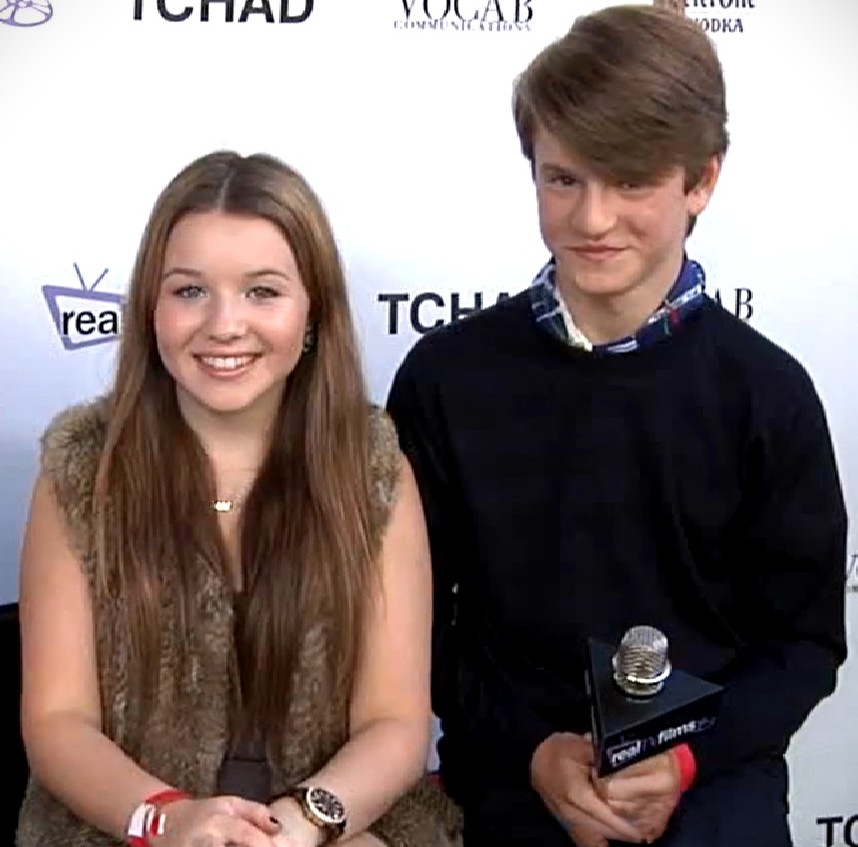
Torri Webster, Michael Murphy in 2011

- Samuel Joseph "Sam" Foster (Michael Murphy) is Tess' twin brother. He is considered a nerd by many of the characters. Sam has a crush on Allie, but his efforts to win her heart always end in rejection.
- Spencer Foster (Jake Goodman) is Tess' youngest brother. He is a 10-year-old, precocious scary-smart, and uses these tools to his advantage.
- Jack David Foster (Sandy Jobin-Bevans) is Tess, Gabe, Spencer and Sam's dad and is also the gym teacher at the high school. He can be a bit overprotective of his family, but he struggles the most with Tess. He is a single dad, because his wife has died.

=== Recurring characters ===
- Bobby Parelli (John-Alan Slachta) is a wrestling champion. He was Tess's enemy. He and Tess started dating behind Allie's back, as Bobby was her ex-boyfriend. After a period of dating, Tess broke up with Bobby, as he went to a baseball game and faked being sick. He soon was swapping numbers with a girl in the stands.
- Kaylee (Francesca Martin) is the show's main antagonist and Tess's rival (though Allie gets along with Kaylee just fine). She enjoys making peoples' lives miserable. She is the head cheerleader, and a very popular. She can be extremely mean and lacks brains. She took advantage of Sam and asked him to complete an A+ grade assignment for her in exchange for one dance at the school formal. Her mother dated Jack Foster.
- Chloe (Madison Scott) is Allie and Tess's back-up friend when they were having a fight. Chloe is only seen a few times but is close friends with Allie and Tess.
- Jessica Jones-Foster (Anne Lickings) is Tess's, Gabe's, Spencer's and Sam's late mom and Jack's late wife.

== Episodes ==
Season	Episodes	Originally released	
Season	Episodes	First released	Last released
1	22	September 9, 2011	October 9, 2012
2	18	October 23, 2012	August 27, 2013

== Accolades ==
Year	Award	Category	Recipient	Result	Ref.
2013	Young Artist Award	Best Performance in a TV Series – Leading Young Actress	Torri Webster	Won	
2013	Young Artist Award	Best Performance in a TV Series – Recurring Young Actor 17–21	Austin MacDonald	Nominated	
2014	Canadian Screen Awards	Children's or youth fiction	Life with Boys	Nominated	
2014	Young Artist Award	Best Performance in a TV Series - Leading Young Actor	Nathan McLeod	Nominated	
2014	Young Artist Award	Best Performance in a TV Series - Recurring Young Actor 17-21	Austin MacDonald	Nominated	

== Broadcast and distribution ==
In September 8, 2010, it was announced that Helicon Pictures would distribute the series in the United Kingdom, France, and Australia, and pre-sold it to Nickelodeon UK, Canal J and the Australian Broadcasting Corporation, respectively. Nelvana Enterprises would distribute the series in its native Canada as well as Latin America and Asia, while Classic Media would handle all other territories.

In February 2012, Nelvana Enterprises and Classic Media jointly signed a broadcast deal with Nickelodeon to hold exclusive TV rights to the series in the United States and Pay-TV rights in Europe, Asia and Latin America. In the United States, the series aired on TeenNick, being previewed on December 28, 2012, premiering on February 6, 2013 and ending on June 12, 2013.

It premiered on April 23, 2012 in Africa. It premiered on November 21, 2011 and ended on December 22, 2012 in the United Kingdom and Ireland. It premiered in March 2012 in Australia, on March 15, 2012 in the Philippines, and on November 6, 2012 in New Zealand. In Canada the show started airing reruns on Nickelodeon Canada and ABC Spark on September 1, 2014 until April 30, 2017.
