= Jason Chen (singer) =

American singer

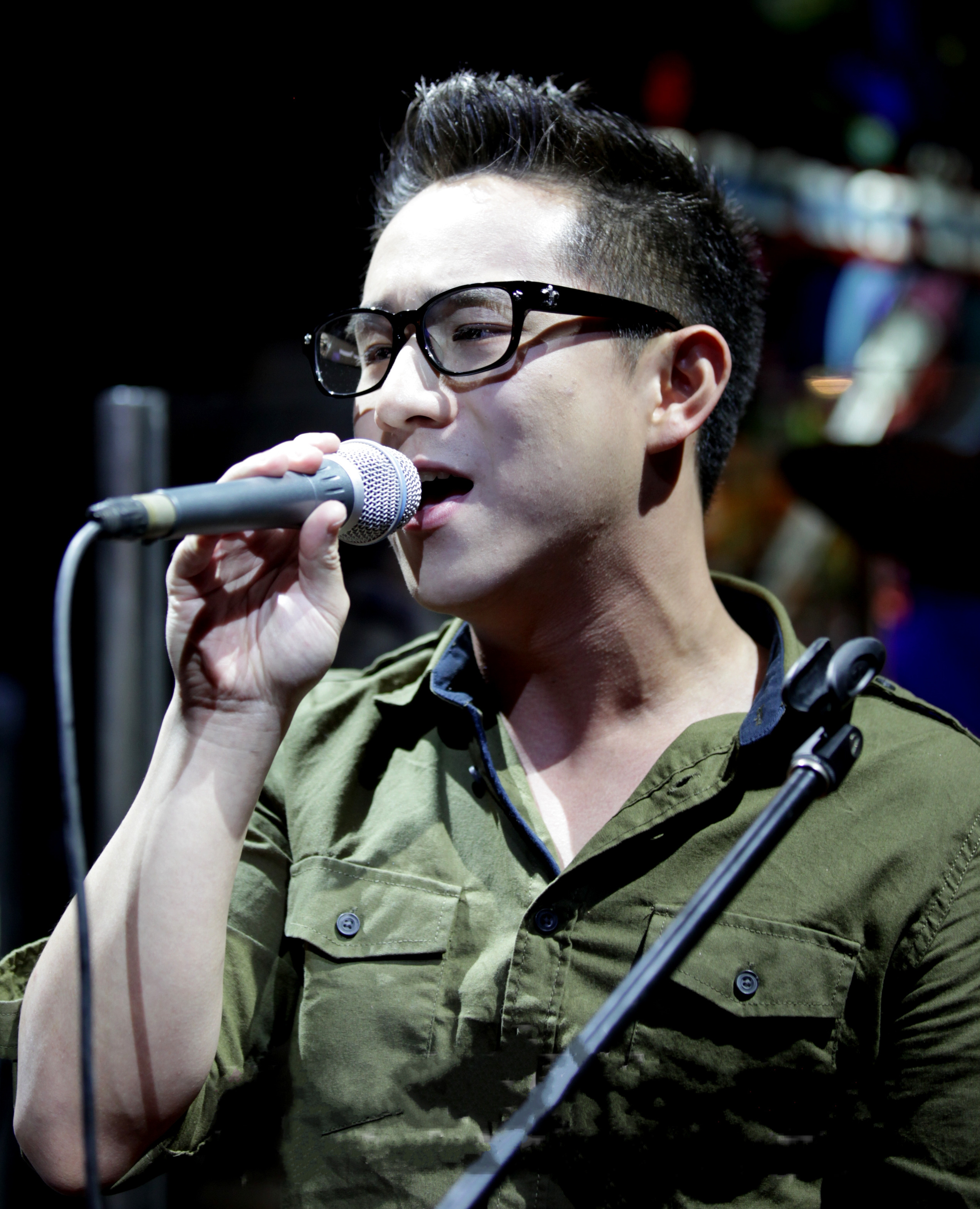
- Chen in 2013

Background information
- Born: November 12, 1988 (age 37); Boston, Massachusetts, United States
- Occupation: Singer
- Years active: 2007–present

Jason Chen (traditional Chinese: 陳以桐; simplified Chinese: 陈以桐; pinyin: Chén Yǐtóng; Jyutping: Can4 Ji5 Tung4; Pe̍h-ōe-jī: Tân Í-tông; Pha̍k-fa-sṳ: Chhîn Yi-thûng, born November 12, 1988) is an American pop singer. He began as a singer performing covers on YouTube, where he gained a sizable following. As of April 17, 2020, his YouTube channel, MusicNeverSleeps, has approximately 1.96 million subscribers. Since 2010, Chen has released dozens of singles and four full albums.

== Early life and education ==
Chen was born in Boston, Massachusetts, to Taiwanese American parents. He moved to Arcadia, California, when he was a few months old. He attended the University of California, Los Angeles, in 2006 and graduated in 2010 with a Bachelor of Arts in economics.

Although he grew up in the United States, he can also speak fluently in another language, Mandarin. Furthermore, Chen's mother is a piano teacher, so he had the advantage of growing up under the influence of music and was given opportunities to learn many different instruments, such as the piano, the guitar, and the violin. Chen discovered his vocal talent at the age of 18 when he was planning a proposal to his high school crush. After graduating from UCLA, he became an accountant for about a year, but later decided to mainly focus on producing music.

== Career ==
Chen started his musical career in 2007, during his second year as an undergraduate student at University of California, Los Angeles. His initial works included performing covers of songs by various renowned artists on YouTube, and as he became more experienced, he began producing and performing original music of his own.

In 2011, he released his first album, Gravity, and the single "Best Friend", which now has over thirty-five million views. He has also performed in various countries such as Australia, Canada, China, Indonesia, Italy, Malaysia, Singapore, and Taiwan, as well as throughout the United States. Although Jason did not receive positive response initially, he started to gain more popularity in 2010.

Encouraged by the rise of his popularity, Chen released his first original album, “Gravity”. Later, he released his second and third original album “Never for Nothing” and "What If Acoustic" in 2013.

In 2014, Chen performed on the main stage at California food festival 626 Night Market.

== Discography ==
- Gravity – 2011 (Album)
- Jie Sheng Qian – February 2013
- Never for Nothing – April 2013 (Album)
- What If – November 2013 (Album)
- Glass Heart – December 2014 (Album)
- Smile For The Camera – December 2016 (Album)
- Ups and Downs – December 2018 (EP)
- Boba – November 2019 (Single)
- Best Friend (10 years) – November 2021 (Single)
- Sometimes – December 2022 (Cover Single)
- I Have Nothing – January 2023 (Cover Single)
- Luckiest Man In The World – February 2024 (Single)
