= Sawfish harvester =

Submersible robot equipped with a chainsaw for harvesting underwater trees

The Sawfish harvester is a submersible robot produced by the Triton Logging Inc. It is designed for cutting down submerged trees and popping them to the surface, with large pincers and a chainsaw. Such trees are generally submerged when dams are built near existing forests, and their wood remains good while underwater for long periods.
