= Louriza Tronco =

Canadian actor

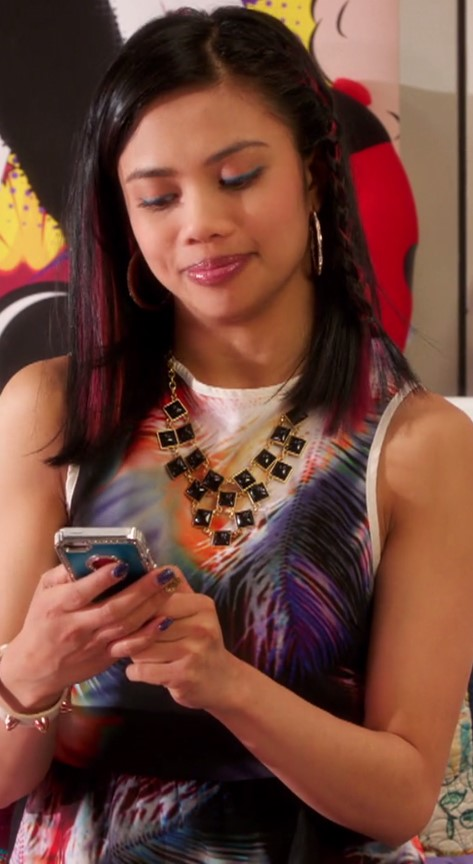
- Tronco in 2015
- Born: October 21, 1993 (age 32); Winnipeg, Manitoba, Canada
- Occupations: Actress, singer
- Years active: 2013–present

Louriza Tronco (born October 21, 1993) is a Canadian actress and singer who is best known for her starring role as Jodi Mappa in the Nickelodeon and YTV musical comedy Make It Pop and for portraying Yuki in the Disney Channel original movie, Zapped. She also played Andrea in Night at the Museum: Secret of the Tomb.

== Early life ==
Tronco was born and raised in Winnipeg, Manitoba, Canada to Filipino immigrants. She has two older brothers, RJ and Emmanuel. At age five, she started acting in a theater arts academy. At age eight, she performed in Rainbow Stage's production of Joseph and the Amazing Technicolor Dreamcoat as part of the children's choir. In school she juggled dance competitions, school plays, and part-time jobs.

She considered massage therapy and cosmetic schools before enrolling at the Canadian College of Performing Arts in Victoria, British Columbia. While attending college six days a week, she regularly traveled to Vancouver for auditions. After the two-year program, she moved to Vancouver to pursue her career full-time.

== Career ==
Tronco got her first break when she was cast in a guest appearance on The CW's Cult in 2013. In 2014, she appeared in the Disney Channel Original Movie Zapped. She also made an appearance in the film Night at the Museum: Secret of the Tomb the same year. She later starred in the Nickelodeon musical comedy show Make It Pop as Jodi Mappa, a member of the band XO-IQ.

In 2019, she appeared in the short film Recess: Third Street, a fan-film based on the Disney cartoon Recess. She starred in the Netflix horror series The Order, which premiered in 2019 and ran for two seasons.

Tronco appeared in the Canadian comedy film Drinkwater, which premiered at the 2021 Calgary International Film Festival. The following year, she appeared in the Hallmark film Love, Classified. She starred in the short film Three Ates and a Wedding, which premiered at the 2024 Los Angeles Asian Pacific Film Festival. In 2025, she appeared in the Hallmark Christmas movie She's Making a List.

== Filmography ==
=== Film ===
Year	Title	Role	Notes
2014	Zapped	Yuki	Television film
2014	The Unauthorized Saved by the Bell Story	Teenager Girl #2	Television film
2014	My Boyfriends' Dogs	Tessa	Television film
2014	Night at the Museum: Secret of the Tomb	Andrea (Nick's Party)	
2015	My Life as a Dead Girl	Kayla	Television film
2015	Badge of Honor	Kim	
2018	No One Would Tell	Alexa	Television film
2018	Road to Christmas	Lucy Grace	Television film
2019	Mystery 101	Lacey Daniels	Television film
2019	Mystery 101: Playing Dead	Lacey Daniels	Television film
2019	Recess: Third Street	Ashley Spinelli	Short
2021	Drinkwater	Wallace	
2022	Love, Classified	Margot	Television film
2022	Easter Sunday	Congregant Analyn	
2022	Niyebe	Rose	Short
2024	Three Ates and a Wedding	Mariah Cruz	Short
2024	Private Princess Christmas	Noelle Le'Trelle	Television film
2025	She's Making a List	Heidi	Television film
TBA	Four Four	Toni	Short

=== Television ===
Year	Title	Role	Notes
2013	Cult	Libby	Episode: "Being Billy"
2015	Ties That Bind	Shelby	Episode: "It Doesn't Show"
2015–2016	Make It Pop	Jodi Mapa	Main role; 42 episodes
2016	The Other Kingdom	Judy	Episode: "Get a Job"
2017	Spiral	Grace	Main role; 7 episodes
2017	Supergirl	N'keyy	Episode: "Far from the Tree"
2018	Rachel	Ashlynn	Episode: "Glad You're Here"
2019–2020	The Order	Gabrielle Dupres	Recurring role (Season 1); Main cast (Season 2)
2022	The Imperfects	Qamara	Episode: “Portland Warehouse Massacre”
2025–2026	Watson	Nurse Reyes	7 episodes
2025	Family Law	Samantha	Episode: "Corporate Retreat"
