= The Other Kingdom =

Nickelodeon fantasy sitcom

- Genre: Sitcom; Fantasy
- Created by: Thomas W. Lynch
- Starring: Esther Zynn; Callan Potter; Celina Martin; Taylor Adams; Josette Halpert
- Countries of origin: United States; Canada
- Original language: English
- No. of seasons: 1
- No. of episodes: 20

Production
- Executive producers: Thomas W. Lynch; Steven DeNure; Anne Loi
- Production locations: Toronto, Ontario, Canada
- Camera setup: Single-camera
- Production companies: DHX Studios Toronto; Nickelodeon Productions; Tom Lynch Company

Original release
- Network: Nickelodeon
- Release: April 10 – June 19, 2016

The Other Kingdom is a fantasy sitcom created by Thomas W. Lynch that aired on Nickelodeon from April 10 to June 19, 2016. The series stars Esther Zynn, Callan Potter, Celina Martin, Taylor Adams, and Josette Halpert.

== Plot ==
Fairy Princess Astral is sent from the Fairy kingdom Athenia to the human world to live as a human, and to attend to a regular high school, for ninety days, after which she must make a decision: go back and eventually assume the throne of Athenia, or remain in the human world and become a human. For her time in the human world, Astral takes the place of a foreign exchange student named Winston who is sent to Athenia in her place.

== Cast and characters ==
=== Main ===
- Esther Zynn as Astral, a fairy princess from the royal kingdom of Athenia who gets a chance to live in the human world and attend high school, where she poses as a foreign exchange student.
- Callan Potter as Tristan, a cute boy in school who is Astral's love interest. He is later revealed to be the lost prince of Spartania.
- Celina Martin as Morgan, Astral's best friend who loves everything fairy related.
- Taylor Adams as Devon, Astral's other friend and with whose family she is staying; it is later revealed that he is half fairy and Astral's cousin.
- Josette Halpert as Hailey, the school's popular girl who is Astral's rival.

=== Recurring ===
- Martin Roach as King Oberon, Astral's father and one of the rulers of Athenia.
- Tori Anderson as Queen Titania, Astral's mother and one of the rulers of Athenia.
- Alvina August as Versitude, advisor to King Oberon and Queen Titania. She is secretive and conniving, and also has a strong dislike of humans.
- C.J. Byrd-Vassell as Winston, a foreign exchange student from England (the one supposed be staying with Devon's family) who stays in Athenia while Astral is in the human world.
- Brett Donahue as Peter Quince, Devon's father; he is later revealed to be King Oberon's older brother who left Athenia because he believes in the technological society of humans.
- Jeff Douglas as Oswald, a knight who watches over Astral while she is the human world. When he is in the human world, he is only 7 inches tall.
- Matt Burns as Brendoni, a troll who is also Astral's cousin and next in line to rule Athenia if Astral decides to stay in the human world. When Brendoni comes to the human world, he is played by Adam Peddle.
- Torri Webster as PeaseBlossom, a wingless fairy who helps Winston in Athenia.

== Episodes ==
No.	Title	Directed by	Written by	Original release date	Prod. code	U.S. viewers (millions)
1	"What Fools These Mortals Be"	Don McCutcheon	Thomas W. Lynch	April 10, 2016	101	1.29
2	"The New Kid"	Don McCutcheon	Thomas W. Lynch	April 10, 2016	102	1.20
3	"Lost in Translation"	Don McCutcheon	Jan Caruana	April 17, 2016	103	1.01
4	"Thanks a Latte!"	Stefan Scaini	Skander Halim	April 17, 2016	104	0.91
5	"Where There's Smoke..."	Stefan Scaini	Thomas W. Lynch	April 24, 2016	105	0.92
6	"Witch!"	Don McCutcheon	Max Burnett	April 24, 2016	106	0.80
7	"Cold Season"	Don McCutcheon	Skander Halim	May 1, 2016	107	1.06
8	"Expiration Date"	Laurie Lynd	Jan Caruana	May 1, 2016	108	0.94
9	"Girls Just Wanna Have Fun"	Laurie Lynd	Karen McClellan	May 8, 2016	109	0.77
10	"I Got This"	Gail Harvey	Thomas W. Lynch	May 8, 2016	110	0.59
11	"Trouncing the Council"	Gail Harvey	Skander Halim	May 15, 2016	111	0.91
12	"Let There Be Cake"	Laurie Lynd	Karen McClellan	May 15, 2016	112	0.85
13	"Get a Job"	Laurie Lynd	Ryan Lynch	May 22, 2016	113	1.19
14	"Bad, Bad Fairy"	Gail Harvey	Thomas W. Lynch	May 22, 2016	114	1.10
15	"Love Hurts"	Gail Harvey	Max Burnett	June 5, 2016	115	0.99
16	"You Can't Go Home Again"	Kaare Andrews	Jan Caruana	June 5, 2016	116	0.83
17	"Cliff Anger"	John L'Ecuyer	Karen McClellan	June 12, 2016	117	0.87
18	"The Campaign"	John L'Ecuyer	Skander Halim	June 12, 2016	118	0.78
19	"The Great Escape"	Gail Harvey	Matt Burnett & Ryan Lynch	June 19, 2016	119	0.93
20	"Hidden in Plain Sight"	Gail Harvey	Thomas W. Lynch	June 19, 2016	120	0.83

== Ratings ==
Viewership and ratings per season of The Other Kingdom
Season	Episodes	First aired		Last aired		Avg. viewers (millions)	18–49 rank
Season	Episodes	Date	Viewers (millions)	Date	Viewers (millions)	Avg. viewers (millions)	18–49 rank
1	20	April 10, 2016	1.29	June 19, 2016	0.83	0.94	TBD
