= Body swap appearances in television =

Storytelling device in television

Body swaps have been a common storytelling device in fiction media, specially in television. In 2013, Disney Channel held a Freaky Freakend with seven shows that featured body-swapping episodes. (Note: On Disney Channel USA, a special marathon of body swap episodes was aired from April 5, 2013 until April 7 at 8/7c. The series with body swap are: Dog With a Blog, Austin & Ally, Jessie, Gravity Falls, Phineas and Ferb, A.N.T. Farm and Shake It Up. The marathon was also aired on June 8 in Latin America, along with Disney movie The Wizards Return: Alex vs. Alex.)

This list features exchanges between two beings, and thus excludes:

- Similar phenomena of body hopping, spirit possession, transmigration, and avatars, unless the target being's mind is conversely placed in the source's body.
- Age transformations that are sometimes reviewed or promoted as body swaps, as in the movies Big and 17 Again
- Identity/role swaps, typically between clones, look-alikes, or doppelgängers;
- Characters with multiple personalities.

== Shows with body swaps ==
The following shows have a body swap as a major storyline or feature a character who has swapped bodies over multiple episodes.

Title	Year	Character	Method / notes	Reference
Dive into You	2026	Twins Yoon Ha Na and Yoon Ha Ru	A magical camcorder given to them by a fairy	
To My Beloved Thief	2026	Hong Eun Jo, a doctor, who doubles as a thief at night, and Yi Yeol, a Grand Prince	Bracelets given to the leads by a Boddhisatva. Swapping happens when one of the leads is in danger.	
Moon River (TV series)	2025	Lee Kang, a crown prince and Park Dal-i, a peddler	A red string of fate	
My Girlfriend is the Man!	2025	Ji Eun and a fictionalised male version of herself	A genetic condition passed down the female ancestors of Ji Eun	
''Henshin! Ponpoko-dama'' (へんしん!ポンポコ玉)	1973	Boy and girl	Magic	
Houkago (放課後)	1992	Azusa Akiyama and Kohei Takamoto	Electrocution underneath utility pole	
Change (チェンジ)	1998	Mother and daughter	Fall	
Behind Her Eyes	2021	Rob Hoyle and Adele Ferguson, then later Louise Barnsley	Astral projection to body switching	
Boy Meets Girl	2009	Danny Reed and Veronica Burton	Struck by lightning	
Dirk Gently's Holistic Detective Agency	2016	Various characters	Body swapping machine	
Drop Dead Diva	2009–2014	Deb and Jane, Grayson and Ian	Pressing the button on a computer in Heaven / Later, Jane returns to Earth by swapping with a third body	
Elseworlds	2018	The Flash and Arrow	Due to John Deegan altering reality, the Flash and Arrow end up in each other's lives.	
Legion	2017	Sydney Barrett	Ability // Sydney's mutation allows her to switch bodies with whomever she touches	
Please Come Back, Soon-Ae	2006	Wife and her husband mistress	Magic	
Punch Line	2015			
Secret Garden	2010	A rich CEO and a stuntwoman	Sharing magic liquor bottle	
Turnabout	1979	Wife and husband	Magic wishes	
Ooh La La Couple (울랄라 부부; RR)	2012	Husband and wife	Magic	
''Dotchi ga dotchi!'' (どっちがどっち!)	2002	Boy and girl	Magic	
Lalola	2008	Man and woman	Voodoo magic	
Konya wa Kokoro Dake Daite (今夜は心だけ抱いて)	2014	47-year-old mother and 17-year-old daughter	Magic	
Yamada-kun and the Seven Witches (山田くんと7人の魔女)	2015	Various characters	Kiss	
Switched (宇宙を駆けるよだか)	2018	Ayumi and Unime; Kaga and Koshiro; Ukon and other woman.	High Jump	
Tales from the Loop	2020	Jakob, Danny, and a Robot	Climbing inside a mysterious metal sphere in the forest; swaps with the nearest person.	
Vic	2018	Vicky & Victoria	Electrocution	
Switch	2017	Emma & Febby	Stuck in the same room	
Abyss (어비스)	2019	Go Se-Yeon and Cha Min are both revived into different bodies after their deaths due to a mysterious bead Abyss.	Magic	
Mirakel	2020	Two girls in Sweden, Mira in 2020 and Rakel in 1920, travel through time and switch bodies.	artificial wormhole	
Love is a Story	2021	Damar, Tristan and Gendis	Trapped in a mysterious cave in the forest; swaps with another person in that cave.	
I'm with Me	2022	White woman and black man.	Magic	
The 7 Lives of Lea	2022	Each night, a teenage girl swaps her body with different people linked to a boy who disappeared in 1991.	Magic	
Heaven and Hell: Soul Exchange (天国と地獄 ~サイコな2人〜)	2021	Detective Mochizuki Ayako and suspect Hidaka Haruto.	Falling down stairs together while in possession of a magical object	
Woman in a Veil	2023	A comatose woman and a woman who blames her for misfortunes.	Lightning strikes when one of them attempts to kill the other who was in a comatose state.	
Great Men Academy	2019	Teenage girl makes a wish on a unicorn, swapping her body with a fictionalized male version of herself.	Magic	
The Day of Becoming You (Chinese)	2021	Male celebrity and female entertainment reporter swap bodies and return to their original bodies repeatedly.	Enabled by close proximity of an asteroid and triggered by physical contact when experiencing strong emotion	
Cupid's Last Wish	2022	Man gets into a car accident with his sister, ending up with the pair's conscious swapped.	Curse	
Vice Versa (Thai)	2022	Characters swap bodies with near-deceased people from other universes, taking over their lives and problems	Multiverse	
Stolen Life	2023	A woman whose life is described as perfect and her cousin who desires her husband and has become a fugitive for parricide	Astral projection ritual	

== Episodes with body swaps ==
TV episodes where characters swap bodies. See also graphic novels and manga.

Title	Year	Episode	Characters	Method / notes	Refs
The Adventures of Jimmy Neutron: Boy Genius	2002	"Trading Faces"	Jimmy and Cindy	Lightning strikes mind-reading device	
Action Pack	2022	"The Importance of Being Ernesto"	Ernesto and Plunky	Transportation machine	
Adventure Time	2012	"Sons of Mars"	Jake and Magic Man	Spell	
Aladdin	1995	"Two to Tangle"	Aladdin and Mozenrath	Mozenrath's gauntlet	
All Dogs Go to Heaven: The Series	1996	"Mutts Ado About Nothing"	Charlie and Itchy	The two dogs were arguing so they were switched into each other's body until they were friends again	
All Hail King Julien	2017	"Fauxsa Unchained"	Clover and Sage	Spell by Jarsh-Jarsh	
Alvinnn!!! and the Chipmunks	2017	"Wacky Wednesday"	Alvin and Jeanette; later Simon, the cat and Derek	A major malfunction in one of Simon's inventions	
The Amazing World of Gumball	2012	"Halloween"	Gumball in Darwin's body, Darwin in Anais's body, Anais in Gumball's body	Potion lets characters escape their bodies / Mix-up in retrieving bodies causes switch	
American Dad!	2010	"Don't Look a Smith Horse in the Mouth"	Stan and his new horse	CIA technology	
American Dad!	2013	"Da Flippity Flop"	Stan and Klaus	CIA technology	
American Dragon: Jake Long		"Dragon Breath"	Trixie and Spud	Souls end up in wrong bodies	
American Dragon: Jake Long		"Switcheroo"	Jake and Haley	Magic mirror	
Angel		"Carpe Noctem"	Angel with an old man called Marcus	Spell	
Annoying Orange	2013	"The Deviled Egg"	Pear and Marshmallow	Souls put in wrong bodiesl (Note: In the Annoying Orange webisode, Deviled Egg can take souls and place them in his Fanny Pack of Despair, but Fanny coughs up Orange's soul and then mixes up the souls of the other characters.)	
Annoying Orange	2018	"Ask Orange #39: The Circle of Knife"	Orange and Pear		
Annoying Orange	2019	"Ask Orange #48: Baldi's in the Kitchen!"	Orange and Marshmallow		
A.N.T. Farm		"MutANT Farm"	Paisley and a duck	Olive's machine	
A.N.T. Farm		"idANTity crisis"	Chyna in Violet's body, Violet in Fletcher's body, Fletcher in Olive's body, and Olive in Chyna's body	Yogurt machine	
Aqua Teen Hunger Force		"Rabbit, Not Rabbot"	Master Shake, Frylock, Meatwad, Carl Brutananadilewski, Dr. Zord, Randy, and Lionel	Urinating in a mall fountain	
Arthur		"Freaky Tuesday"	Buster and Mr. Ratburn	Electrical Spanakopita; Buster's dream	
Atomic Betty		"Switchmo-Tized"	Sparky and Minimus; Various characters	Spell by robot magician	
Atomic Puppet		"The Switch"	Captain Atomic and Princess War Tickle	Sphere of transference	
Austin & Ally		"Freaky Friends & Fan Fiction"	Austin in Dez's body, Trish in Ally's body, Ally in Trish's body and Dez in Austin's body. Later, Ally and Dez switch bodies	Magic typewriter	
Austin & Ally		"Scary Spirits and Spooky Stories"	Eri and Ally	Spell by Eri	
The Avengers		"Who's Who"	Enemy agents swap bodies with Steed and Mrs. Peel	Machine	
Avengers Assemble		"The Avengers Protocol"	Captain America and Red Skull	Body switching machine	
Avengers Assemble		"Head to Head"	Black Widow, Hulk, Falcon, Captain America, Iron Man, Hawkeye, Thor	Mind Gem	
Bakuryuu Sentai Abaranger		"Ep. 27: AbaRed is Abare Blue"	Ryouga, Yukito, Tyranno and Kera, and various characters	Spell by Trinoid #16: Tsutakotatsu	
Batman: The Brave and the Bold		"The Criss Cross Conspiracy!"	Batman and Katrina Moldoff	Felix Faust's spell	
Beast Wars Neo		"Break is a Predacon?"	Break and Saberback	Phantom Crystal	
Behind Her Eyes		"Behind Her Eyes"	Rob & Adele; Adele & Louise	Astral projection practice	
Ben 10 (2005)	2006	"A Change of Face"	Gwen with Charmcaster, and later with Ben	Charmcaster's spell	
Ben 10: Omniverse		"Ben Again"	11-year-old Ben with 16-year-old Ben	Eon's cross-time brain switch	
Ben 10 (2016)		"Freaky Gwen Ben"	Gwen and Ben	Spell by Hex	
Ben 10 (2016)		"Charm School's Out"	Gwen and Charmcaster	Charmcaster's spell	
Best Friends Whenever		"A Time to Double Date"	Bret and Chet	Machine malfunction	
Bewitched		"The Mother-in-Law of the Year"	Samantha and Endora	Samantha and Endora spell	
Bewitched		"Samantha Loses Her Voice"	Samantha and Darrin Stephens // voices only	Uncle Arthur's spell swap	
Bewitched		"Mixed Doubles"	Samantha Stephens and Louise Tate	Samantha's Dream	
Big Bad Beetleborgs		"The Good, the Bad, and the Scary"	Drew and Noxic; Roland and Typhus; Jo and Jara	Fangula's spell	
Big Hero 6: The Series		"Trading Chips"	Baymax and Mini-Max	Switching chips	
Big Mouth		"F**ked Up Friday"	Nick Birch, Andrew Glouberman, Jessi Glaser, Missy Foreman-Greenwald, Jay Bilzerian, Nick's McGregor Grandfather, Marty Glouberman, Baby Glaser, Nathan Fillion and Coach Steve		
Big Wolf on Campus		"The Pleasantville Strangler"	The ghost of an old man and various characters	Touch	
Big Wolf on Campus		"Switch Me Baby One More Time"	Alice and Lori	Body jump	
Blinky Bill's Extraordinary Excursion		"Blinky the Hypnotist"	Mayor Pelican and Marcia; Miss Magiepie and Splodge; Flap and Mr. Wombat	Hypnotism	
Bounty Hamster		"Trading Spaces"	Cassie and an alien	Body swapping device	
The Brady Kids		"Double Trouble"	Bobby and actor Clint Flint	Marlon the magic bird	
Bravest Warriors		"Merewif Tag"	Chris and Plum	Merewif Tag (Plum's special ability)	
Breadwinners		"Switcheroo"	SwaySway and Buhdeuce	Switcheroo bread	
Brittani Louise Taylor		"Body Swap"	Brittani Louise Taylor and Andre Meadows (a.k.a. "Black Nerd")	Fortune Cookie	
Buffy the Vampire Slayer		"This Year's Girl" / "Who Are You"	Faith and Buffy	Mystical device	
Buffy the Vampire Slayer		"Witch"	Amy Madison and her mother Catherine	Spell	
Bugs Bunny		"Hot Cross Bunny"	Scientist and chicken	Device	
French: Candice Renoir (police series)		French: L'union fait la force	Commandant Candice Renoir & Commissaire Antoine Dumas	hypnotism	
Camp Lakebottom		"Being McGee"	McGee and Buttsquat	Cursed amulet	
Captain Planet and the Planeteers		"The Unbearable Blightness of Being"	Gaia and Dr. Blight	Dr. Blight's body-switching device	
Captain Simian & the Space Monkeys		"Escape from the Plant of the Apes"	Captain Simian and Shao Lin	Psycho-neural interceptor	
The Centurions		"Double Agent"	Ace and Hacker	mind swap	
ChalkZone		"Bullsnap"	Snap and a bull.	Teleportation device	
Charmed (1998)		"Enter the Demon"	Phoebe and Paige, Piper and the Zen Master	Accidental spell and Paige's potion	
Charmed (1998)		"Freaky Phoebe"	Phoebe and Amara	Spell cast by Amara	
Charmed (1998)		"The Lost Picture Show"	Piper and Leo	Spell cast by magical marriage counsellor	
Charmed (2018)		"Switches & Stones"	Mel and Maggie	Touch	
Chikyu Sentai Fiveman		"Super Twin Strategy"	Fumiya and Remi, Various characters	Spelled by Sasorinamazugin	
Chip 'n Dale: Rescue Rangers		"A Fly in the Ointment"	Zipper and Professor Nimnul, Chip and Monterey Jack, Dale and Gadget	Teleportation device (Phonomatic Modemizer)	
Chowder		"A Little Bit of Pizzazz"	Mung, Truffles, Schnitzel and Chowder; Mung and Endive later switch	Mind-swapping ingredient Pizzazz and explosion	
Chuck Finn		"The Switcheroo"	Chuck and Sarah	Exchanging of souls	
Cleopatra 2525		"In Your Boots"	Creegan and Hal	Gadget guy	
Close Enough		"Never Meet Your Heroes"	Alex and Sir Jack, various characters		
Code Lyoko		"A Fine Mess"	Yumi Ishiyama and Odd Della Robbia	Computer malfunction	
Community		"Basic Human Anatomy"	Troy and Abed	Wish / Dissociation	
Cousin Skeeter		"Trading Places"	Nina and Skeeter, later his parents	magical doll	
The Crumpets		"The Mix-Up"	Ms. McBrisk, T-Bone the dog, and a garden gnome	Electronic telepathy machine	
The Daily Show			Jon Stewart and Justin Bieber		
Danger Mouse		"There's a Penfold in my Suit"	Danger Mouse and Penfold, Baron Greenback and Stiletto	Mystic stone	
Danny Phantom		"Splitting Images"	Danny and Sidney Poindexter	Ghost Ability	
Darkwing Duck		"Trading Faces"	Darkwing and Gosalyn, Launchpad and Honker	Computer malfunction	
The Day My Butt Went Psycho!		"Wacky Wednesday"	Zack and Deuce	Soul swapping	
DC Super Hero Girls		"#BatAndSwitch"	Batgirl and various characters	Zatanna's spell	
DC Super Hero Girls		"#AllAboutZee"	Zatanna and Casey Krinsky	Casey's magic powers	
Delightful Moomin Family: Adventure Diary		"Funny Disguises"	Moomintroll and Stinky	Rolling down a hill while tussling, then finally crashing into a hollow base of a tree.	
Dennis the Menace		"It's a Ruff Life"	Joey and Ruff; Mr. Wilson and a Bulldog	Brain wave machine	
Dexter's Laboratory		"Changes"	Dexter and Dee Dee	Dexter's invention	
Dexter's Laboratory		"Mom and Jerry"	Dexter and a mouse	Brain-transplant machine	
Dick Figures		"Brain Switch"	Red and Blue		
Dinosaurs		"If I Were a Tree"	Earl and a tree	Lightning	
Disney's Adventures of the Gummi Bears		"If I Were You"	Duke Igthorn and Tummi Gummi	Magic Wand	
Doctor Who		"New Earth"	Lady Cassandra and the Tenth Doctor; Cassandra and Rose Tyler	Psychograft	
Dog With a Blog		"Freaky Fido"	Stan and Tyler, Ellen and Bennett	Lightning	
Dollhouse		"Belle Chose"	Victor as Kiki; Echo as Terry	imprint	
Donkey Kong Country		"The Big Switcheroo"	Donkey Kong and a robot, Candy Kong and General Klump	Mind-swapping helmets	
Dora and Friends: Into the City!		"For the Birds"	Emma and the bird	With the power of singing	
Doug		"Doug's Dog Date"	Doug and Porkchop	Doug's imagination; Mind-switching Machine	
Dragon Ball Super			Ginyu (in a Nameklan Frog's Body) and Tagoma	Body Change technique	
Dragon Ball Super			Goku and Zamasu	Super Dragon Balls	
Dragon Booster		"The Changelings"	Artha and Beau	Word's Mind Gear	
Drop Dead Weird		"Freaky Friday"	Mum, Frankie, Dad, Grandad Champ, everyone, zombies	Frankie's device invention	
Eerie, Indiana		"No Brain, No Pain"	Simon, Chappy, Marshall, wife	Device (Brainalyzer)	
8 Simple Rules		"Freaky Friday"	Grandpa and C.J., Bridget and her mother, Rory and his hamster	Cate's dream after watching Freaky Friday	
El Chapulin Colorado			Thin Female Doctor and Fat Male Doctor; Another Doctor and Scientist's Pet Dog	Machine	
The Emperor's New School		"Faking the Grade"	Kronk and Yzma	Flip or Snapper Potions	
Encantadia (2016 TV series)		"Huwad"	Danaya and Avria	Spell by Avria	
Engine Sentai Go-onger		"GP 12: Sosuke Banki!?"	Sosuke and Hatsuden Banki	Electrocution	
Eureka		"Jack of All Trades"	Carter, Fargo, Zane, Allison	Mind-mining program	
The Fairly OddParents		"Dog's Day Afternoon"	Timmy Turner and Vicky's dog	Wish	
The Fairly OddParents		"Blondas Have More Fun"	Wanda and Blonda		
The Fairly OddParents		"Presto Change-O"	Timmy, A.J., Francis, Mr. Crocker, Timmy's parents, Vicky, Vicky's dog	Wish for body-swapping device	
The Fairly OddParents		"Manic Mom-Day"	Timmy and his mom	Wish	
The Fairly OddParents		"Country Clubbed"	Wanda and Sparky	Brain swap ray	
The Fairly OddParents		"Which is Wish"	Timmy and Chloe	Wish	
Family Guy		"Lois Kills Stewie"	Peter and Lois	Stewie's invention	
Family Guy		"Switch the Flip"	Brian and Stewie, Peter and Stewie, Brian and Chris, various characters	Stewie's invention	
Fanboy & Chum Chum		"I, Fanbot"	Fanboy and a Robot	Brain transplant	
Fantastic Four: World's Greatest Heroes		"Doomed"	Reed Richards/Mr. Fantastic and Doctor Doom	Injection	
Fantasy Island (1977)		"The Big Switch"	George and Laura Walters	Wish	
Fantasy Island (2021)		"His and Hers/The Heartbreak Hotel"	Daphne and Zev	Kiss	
Farscape		"Out of Their Minds"	John, Aeryn, Rygel, Pilot, D'Argo, Chiana	Alien weapon	
Fear Itself		"Family Man"	Dennis Maloney (family man) and Richard Brautigan (mass murderer)	Unknown, being in near death state in the same hospital	
The Flintstones		"Monster Fred"	Various characters	Device (mad scientist)	
Freefonix		"Bizarro BB"	BB and Lady Lux	Guitar powers	
Friday the 13th: The Series		"The Long Road Home"		Samsara charm	
Friday the 13th: The Series		"My Wife as a Dog"	Firefighter's wife and his dog	Aboriginal Leash of Dreams	
FriendZSpace		"Science Project"	Kim and an Alien called Taco	Brain Switching device	
Futurama: Bender's Game		--	Professor Farnsworth and a monkey	Device	
Futurama		"The Prisoner of Benda"	Professor Farnsworth and Amy, various characters	Machine	(Note: In the Futurama episode "The Prisoner of Benda", various characters use a mind-swapping machine to switch bodies, but the machine does not allow two people who have already switched bodies to switch back with each other. This is overcome by a mathematical proof that allows everyone to return to their original bodies by involving two more characters.)
Gadget & the Gadgetinis		"Swap Team"	Gadget, Miss Mithit and an ogre	Swap Control Centre	
Garfield and Friends		"The Idol of ID"	Garfield and Odie; Jon and a gypsy	magic statue	
The Garfield Show		"Freaky Monday"	Garfield and Odie	Spell by alien	
Gawayn		"Love Trouble"	William and giant	Magic wand	
Genie in the House		"Out of Our Minds"	Philip and Emma Norton	Wish	
Geronimo Stilton		"The Incredible Shrinking Stiltons"	Matilda and Trap Stilton	Machine	
Geronimo Stilton		"Trade Off"	Sally Ratmousen and Geronimo Stilton	Machine	
Get a Life		"The One Where Chris and Larry Switch Lives"	Chris Peterson and Larry Potter	Indian curse	
The Ghost and Molly McGee		"The Ghost IS Molly McGee"	Molly and Scratch	Possession	
Gilligan's Island		"The Friendly Physician"	The castaways	Machine	
Glee		"Props"	Various characters	Bump to the head	(Note: Tina bumps her head when she falls into a fountain and it causes her to see everyone body-swapped in the Glee Club, including herself.)
Good Mythical Morning		"Swapping bodies w/ a Mannequin, VR Experiment"	Rhett and a Mannequin, Link and a Mannequin, Rhett and Link	VR Experiment	
Good Omens		"The Very Last Day of The Rest of Their Lives"	Aziraphale and Crowley	Body-swapping Gambit	
Gormiti: The Supreme Eclipse Era!		"Exchange of Powers"	Toby and Lucas		
Gravity Falls		"Carpet Diem"	Dipper and Mabel, Soos and Waddles, Dipper and Candy, various characters	Experimental carpet	
Grimsburg	2026	"Flutey Friday"	Marvin and Stan		
Grizzy & the Lemmings		"Wandering Spirits"	Grizzy and a Moose		
Groundling Marsh		"Tupelo Treat"	Maggie and Mud	Tupelo Treat	
Hamster & Gretel		"Squeaky Friday"	Hamster and Churro	a newly created body switching remote by Scientist Doug	
Happy Endings		"Party of Six"	Various characters	Curse	
Harvey Beaks		"Princess Harvey"	Harvey and Princess	Magic Crystal	
Harvey Birdman, Attorney at Law		"Mindless"	Spyro, the dog, baby and someone's butt	Mentok the Mind-Taker	
The Haunted Hathaways		"Haunted Camping"	Louie and Ray	Possession ability, applied simultaneously on an object.	
Haven		"The Old Switcheroo"	Vince and Dave, Gloria and Dwight, Nathan and Duke, various characters	Trouble	
He-Man and the Masters of the Universe (2021)		"In-Can't-Ation"	Main characters and creatures	Orko's magic	
Henry Danger		"Captain Man-kini"	Captain Man and Frankini		
Hero: 108		"About Faces"	HighRoller and Lin Chung	Transference scepter	
Highway to Heaven		"Change of Life"	Mark Gordon and actress Linda Blackwell	Wish	
Hilda		Season 2, "Chapter 13: The Stone Forest"	Hilda and Troll	Magic	
Home: Adventures with Tip & Oh		"Pig's Tale"	Tip and Pig		
Honey, I Shrunk the Kids: The TV Show		"Honey, You've Got Nine Lives"	Diane and Bianca's cat, Wayne and Quark	Neuron Nudger invention	
Hot Wheels Battle Force 5		"Fusion Confusion"	Shermen Cortez and Grimian	Brain switch	
Hotel Transylvania: The Series		"Brain Drain"	Hank and Zombie Isaac Newton		
Hotel Transylvania: The Series		"Cursery Rhymes"	Pedro and Wendy, Hank and Lydia Dracula, Mavis and Baby Blendy	Baby Blendy’s Talking Spell	
The Huckleberry Hound Show		"Yogi Bear: "Brainy Bear""	Yogi and a Chicken, then with the Scientist	Machine	
I Am Weasel		"I Architect"	I.R. Baboon and I.M. Weasel		
I Dream of Jeannie		"Haven't I Seen Me Someplace Before?"	Roger and Tony	Wish	
"I Got a Rocket!"		"Fly a Mile in My Boosters"	Vinnie and Rocket		
Ice Fantasy		Episode 59	Lan Shang and Li Luo	Souls in wrong bodies	
Inside Job		"Sex Machina"	Brett and Glenn		
Intergalactic Kitchen		"Take Me to Your Larder"	Various characters	Machine malfunction	
Inspector Gadget (2015)		"Brain Drain"	Various characters		
It's Always Sunny in Philadelphia		"The Gang Turns Black"	Frank, Charlie, Mac, Dennis and Sweet Dee	A short out from an electric heating blanket while the gang watches The Wiz; Dream	
Jackie Chan Adventures		"Sheep In, Sheep Out"	Jackie and Jade	Spell by Uncle (which went horribly wrong)	
Jacob Two-Two		"Jacob Two-Two and the Big Brain Exchange"	Jacob and Principal Greedyguts		
Jade Armor		"The Kitty"	Various characters	Cat's Shard	
Jake and the Never Land Pirates		"Monkey Tiki Trouble"	Captain Hook and King Zongo	Magic monkey tiki	
Jeannie		"The Wish"	Henry and Corey	Birthday Wish	
The Jersey		"Jersey Switch"	Morgan and Hilary	An electric shock from a magical jersey along with Elliot's scientific experiment	
Jessie		"To Be Me, or Not To Be Me"	Jessie and Zuri, Ravi and Bertram, Emma and Luke, Jessie and Mrs. Kipling	Magic bell	
Jimmy Two-Shoes		"Monster Mutt"	Beezy and Cerbee; Jimmy and Heloise	Heloise's trouble	
Johnny Test		"Papa Johnny"	Johnny and Hugh (his dad), Susan and Lila (her mom)	Machine	
Johnny Test		"Johnny Susan, Susan Johnny"	Susan and Johnny	Machine	
Juanpa Zurita Comedy		"Body Swap"	Juanpa Zurita and Hannah Stocking		
Jumanji		"Who Am I?"	Various characters	Ball of light	
Justice League Action		"Mxy's Mix-Up"	Batman, Superman and Stargirl; various characters	Mister Mxyzptlk's powers	
Justice League Unlimited		"The Great Brain Robbery"	Flash and Lex Luthor	Combination of Doctor Fate's spell and Luthor scanning Gorilla Grodd's brain	
Kaeloo		"Let's Play Happy Rotter"	Kaeloo, Stumpy and Quack Quack	Magic	
Kaitou Sentai Lupinranger VS Keisatsu Sentai Patranger		"Number 16: Because You're A Friend"	Tooma and Manta Bayarsh	Spell by Manta Bayarsh	
Kaizoku Sentai Gokaiger		"A More Than Usual Gokai Change"	Doc and Luka	Spell by Regaeru	
Kamen Rider Gotchard		Kamen Rider Gotchard: What's that?! Houtaro and Rinne Swapped Bodies!!	Houtaro and Rinne	Inphoenix and Firemars Chemy Cards	
Kamp Koral: SpongeBob's Under Years		"The Switch Glitch"	Patrick and Karen	Lightning berries and Karen's computer circuitry	
Kappa Mikey		"Manic Monday"	Lily and Mitsuki	Magic bracelets	
Kickin' It		"The Amazing Krupnick"	Ronny Blaze and a turtle	Spell	
Kid vs. Kat		"Board Kat"	Coop and Kat; Dennis and Kat	Device (Kat's invention)	
Kikai Sentai Zenkaiger		"No. 32-kai! Sakasama Gets Angry! Is That a Monkey?"	Kaito, Stacy, Zocks, Flint, TwokaiRicky and TwokaiCutanner	Spell by Inverted World	
Kim Possible		"Mind Games"	Kim and Ron, Dr. Drakken and Private Dobbs, Ron and Rufus	Machine	
King Arthur's Disasters		"King Guinevere"	King Arthur and Princess Guinevere	Merlin Spell	
Krypto the Superdog		"Dog-Gone Kevin"	Krypto and Kevin Whitney	Red Kryptonite	
Kung Fu Panda: Legends of Awesomeness		"Shifu's Ex"	Shifu and Mei Ling	Zhou Deng Soul Gem	
Kyukyu Sentai GoGoFive		"Ep. 37: The Beauty is a Psyma Beast!?"	Garubaria, Matoi Tatsumi and Tsugumi Inui	The Roses	
Last Week Tonight with John Oliver		"Trade"	Melania Trump and an aluminium worker from Missouri	Lightning flash	
Legacies		"You Will Remember Me"	Aurora and Hope	Aurora spell	
Legend of the Seeker		"Identity"	Richard and Gryff		
Legends of Tomorrow		"Helen Hunt"	Martin Stein and Jefferson Jackson	Unsuccessful attempt to transfer the Firestorm matrix	
The Legend of William Tell		"The Tomb of the Unknown Warrior"	Will and Drogo		
Legion		"Chapter 1"	David and Sydney	Kiss	
Legion		"Chapter 24"	David and Sydney	Touch	
The Librarians		"And Some Dude Named Jeff"	Jenkins and Jeff	Spell book	
The Librarians: The Next Chapter		"And Descartes' Dilemma"	Charlie, Connor, Vikram, Lysa and Merlin	Spell	
Lilo & Stitch: The Series		"Swapper"	Gantu and Hämsterviel, Lilo and Stitch, Jumba and Pleakley; Lilo, Stitch, Jumba, and Pleakley later get swapped again.	Experiment 355 / Swapper	
Little Charmers		"Charming Pets"	Various characters	Spell	
Little Charmers		"Switcheroo"	Hazel and Hazel's mom	Magic aging cream	
Little Charmers		"All Stirred Up"	Various characters	Transformation spell	
Little Charmers		"A Little Too Much Parsley"	Hazel and Parsley	Spell	
The Little Mermaid		"Giggles"	Flounder and Sebastian	Sorcerer blowfish's spell	
Lizzie McGuire		"Those Freaky McGuires"	Matt and Lizzie	Arguing	
Lloyd in Space		"Lloyd Changes His Mind"	Lloyd and Francine	Mind-reading device	
Lois & Clark: The New Adventures of Superman		"I've Got You Under My Skin"	Superman and Woody	Magical crystal	
Lost Girl		"Original Skin"	Various characters	Ingesting Gorgon's blood	
Lunar Jim		"The Big Switcheroo"	Rover and TED	Teleporting machine	
Magic: Famille féerique Magic: Fairy Family		"Vis ma Vie" "Live My Life"	Tom and Cindy	Magic Wand	
The Magicians		"Garden Variety Homicide"	Margo and Eliot	Body-swapping potion	
Mahou Sentai Magiranger		"Stage 39: Contrary Brother and Sister" - "Stage 40: The Gorgon's Garden"	Kai Ozu and his sister Houka Ozu	Spell by Hades Warrior God Toad (ep 39), Spell by Hades Wise Goddess Sphinx (ep 40)	
Marsupilami		"Marsupilami meets Doctor Normanstein"	Maurice and Marsupilami; Norman Frankenrilla and Chicken	Mind-swapping device	
Martha Speaks		"Dog for a Day"	Martha and TD		
Mashin Sentai Kiramager		"Episode 19: Partners"	The Kiramagers and their Mashins, Galza and Carantula and various characters.	Spell by the Sumikae Jamen	
Max Steel (2013)		"Reprogrammed"	Max and Steel		
Medium		"Bring Your Daughter to Work Day"	Allison Dubois and her daughter Bridgette		
Meet the Browns		"Meet the Switch"	Joaquin and Will	Wish	
Mega Man (1994 TV series)		"Bot Transfer"	Mega Man and Snake Man	Dr. Wily's machine	
Megamind Rules!		"Megamayor"	Megamind and Roxanne	Megamind's body-swapping device	
Mentors		"The Other Half"	Simon and Crystal	Machinery	
Mickey Mouse		"New Shoes"	Mickey Mouse, Donald Duck, and Goofy	Getting punched by Pete	
The Mighty B!		"Hen and Bappy"	Ben and Happy; Bessie and Hippie	Magic taquitos	
Mighty Morphin Power Rangers		"Switching Places"	Billy and Kimberly; Bulk and Skull	Machine sabotage	
Misfits		Series 3 Episode 5	Kelly and Jen	Body hijacking	
Moon Girl and Devil Dinosaur		"Goodnight, Moon Girl"	Moon Girl and Devil Dinosaur	Universal remote	
Monster Beach		"Doctor Switch"	Jan and Dr. Knutt	Magic wand	
Monster High		"Freaky Fridate"	Ghoulia and Cleo	Curse from ancient artifact	
Monster High		"Monster Midterms"	Draculaura and Dracula		
Monster Loving Maniacs		"Body Swap"	Dracula and Edith	A local inventor's machine	
The Mr. Peabody & Sherman Show		"Brain Switch"	Mr. Peabody and Sherman; various characters	Machine	
Mr. Pickles		"The Tree of Flesh"	Henry Gobbleblobber & Mrs. Prissy Paws	Spell	
Mr. Young		"Mr. Switch"	Adam into Echo's body; Echo into Derby's body; Derby into Slab's body; Slab into Ivy's body; Ivy into Dang's body; Dang into Adam's body; Mr. Tator and Ms. Byrne	Machine malfunction	
Mummies Alive!		"Who's Who"	Ja-Kal and Nefer-Tina; Armor and Rath; Scarab and Ammut; Presley and Kahti; then Armor and Heka	An identity change by Bes	
The Muppet Show		"Harry Belafonte"; Pigs in Space "Dissolvatron" segment	Miss Piggy and Link Hogthrob, Dr. Julius Strangepork and Janice, Kermit the Frog and Swedish Chef	Dissolvatron	
My Favorite Martian		"I'd Rather Fight Than Switch"	Uncle Martin O'Hara and Mrs. Lorelei Brown	Malfunctioning molecular reassembler	
My Friends Tigger & Pooh		"The Tiglet and Pigger Switcher-Roo"	Tigger and Piglet	Magic trick goes wrong	
My Hero		"Brain Drain"	Janet, Taylor, Piers, Standley's Parents Ella and Stanley Hawkins	Space Walkman	
My Little Pony: Friendship is Magic		"She Talks to Angel"	Fluttershy and Angel	Zecora's potion	
My Little Pony: Pony Life		"Wild Hearts Beats"	Twilight Sparkle and Spike	Combination of wish energy and Wild Side magic	
Ned's Newt		"Newt's Ned"	Ned and Newton	Lightning strike	
The New Adventures of Mighty Mouse		"The Great Space Chase"	Pearl Pureheart and Oil Can Harry	Mind Reading Machine	
The New Archies		"Change of Minds"	Eugene and Moose; Archie and Jughead	Eugene's Invention	
The New Electric Company		"Scrambled Brains"	Annie and Lisa	Hypnosis	
The New Scooby and Scrappy-Doo Show		"Who's Minding the Monster?"	Frankenstein's Monster and a Duck	Brain-switching ray	
The New Woody Woodpecker Show		"Frankenwoody"	Wally Walrus and Woody, later Woody's girl	Machine	
Neighbors from Hell		“Wolf Power”	Champagne and The Japanese businessman's wife	Vlaartark electric cable	
Night Gallery		"The Housekeeper"	Housekeeper and wife	Spell	
Night Gallery		"Since aunt Ada came to stay"	Old witch and wife	Based on the short story "The Witch" by A. E. van Vogt	
The Nightmare Worlds of H. G. Wells		"The Late Mr Elvesham"	Edward Eden & Egbert Elvesham	Based on the H. G. Wells story	
Noonbory and the Super Seven		"The Great Switcheroo"	Cozybory and Wangury	Spell	
Nowhere Boys		Season 2 Episode 11	Roland and Sam	Spell	
The Nutshack		"The Slasher"	Phil and Chita		
Oddballs		"Body Swap"	Echo and Dr. Squats. Echo and Max, Then Max in Echo's body with Mr. Mcfly, now Mr. Mcfly is in Echo's body.	Echo's Invention	
Oddbods		"Swan Lake"	Fuse and Newt; A Frog and A Chicken	Bubbles' invention	
Odd Squad		"Invasion of the Body Switchers"	Ms. O and Agent Oscar		
Ohsama Sentai King-Ohger		"Ep. 28: Shuffle Kings!"	Gira Husty, Yanma Gast, Hymeno Ran, Rita Kaniska, Kaguragi Dybowski and Jeramie Brasieri	Spell by Goma Rosalia	
Ollie and Friends		"Body Swapped"	Ollie and Rover	Time machine malfunction	
One on One		"Manic Monday"	Mark "Flex" Washington and Breanna Barnes	Magic	
Once Upon a Time		"Save Henry" - "Going Home"	Peter Pan and Henry		
The Outer Limits (1963)		"The Human Factor"	Dr. James Hamilton and Maj. Roger Brothers	Machine	
The Outer Limits (1995)		"The Conversion"	mysterious man and a criminal	second chance	
Out of Jimmy's Head		"Out of Jimmy's Body"	Jimmy and Sonny; Jimmy's dad and a parrot; Robin and her piano teacher	Magic pelvis outfitted with Japanese technology	
The Owl House		"Once Upon a Swap"	Luz, Eda, and King	Eda's spell	
Packages from Planet X		"Mind Licorice"	Dan, Troll, and a Raccoon	Alien licorice	
Papyrus		"Princess Tiya"	Papyrus and Tiya	Magic mirror	
PAW Patrol		"Pups Save a Freaky Pup-Day"	Chase and Chickaletta	Chase's dream	
Pencilmation		"A Splice of Life"	Pencilmiss and a dog	Pencilmate's teleportator	
The Penguins of Madagascar		"Roger Dodger"	Rico and Roger the Gator	Kowalski's device	
The Penguins of Madagascar		"King Me"	Various characters	Kowalski's device	
The Penguins of Madagascar		"High Moltage"	Maurice and Julien	Kowalski's device	
Penn Zero: Part-Time Hero		"Trading Faces"	Rippen and Larry	Multiverse portal goes awry	
Pepper Ann		"My Mother, Myself"	Pepper Ann and Lydia	Meteor shower	
Pet Alien		"The Evil That Thumbs Do"	Tommy and Swanky	Lightning	
Phil of the Future		"Neander Phil"	Phil and Curtis	Machine malfunction	
Phil of the Future		"Versa Day"	Phil and Pim	Dad Spell "Vice Versa Day"	
Phineas and Ferb		"Does This Duckbill Make Me Look Fat?"	Candace and Perry	Phineas and Ferb's invention	
Phineas and Ferb		"Mind Share"	The Gang and aliens	Alien weapon	
The Pirates of Dark Water		"The Soul Stealer"	Ren and Bloth; Niddler and Konk		
Pixelface		"Body Swap"	Aethelwynne and Sgt. Riley	Accident involving a plasma ball	
Popeye		"I Yam Wot I Yamnesia"	Popeye, Olive Oyl, Wimpy and SweetPea	Bump on the head	
Popular Mechanics for Kids		"Escape"	Tyler Kyte and Elisha Cuthbert	Wish	
Potatoes and Dragons		"It Wasn't Me"	King Hugo and Dragon		
The Powerpuff Girls (1998)		"Criss Cross Crisis"	Various characters	Machine malfunction	
The Powerpuff Girls (2016)		"Blundercup"	Buttercup and Butter Boy	Butter Boy's powers	
Power Rangers Beast Morphers		"The Silva Switch"	Nate and Steel	Ben's and Betty's Invention	
Power Rangers Dino Charge		"Love at First Fight"	Brittany and Beauticruel	Spell by Beauticruel's Brush	
Power Rangers Dino Fury		"The Makeover"	Zayto, Ollie, Amelia, Javi, Aiyon and a Pigeon	Spell by Boneswitch	
Power Rangers in Space		"Invasion of the Body Switcher"	Ashley and Astronema	Spell by Body Switcher	
Power Rangers Ninja Storm		"Sensei Switcheroo"	Shane and Sensei, Dustin and Sensei	Machine malfunction	
Power Rangers S.P.D. (Tokusou Sentai Dekaranger)		"Recognition" ("Fake Blue")	Sky and Wootox (Houji and Wojonian)	Wootox's special ability / activated by head-butt (Note: The "Fake Blue" episode in Tokusou Sentai Dekaranger was remade as the "Recognition" episode in Power Rangers S.P.D.)	
Power Rangers Super Megaforce		"The Grass is Always Greener... or Bluer"	Jake and Noah	Spell by Tranceferer	
Power Rangers Super Ninja Steel		"Monster Mix Up"	Super Ninja Steel Rangers and the Gruesome Grunts	Spell by Versix	
Power Rangers Super Samurai		"Trading Places"	Mike and Switchbeast; Various humans and objects	Switchbeast's special ability	
The Prisoner		"Do Not Forsake Me Oh My Darling"	Number Six and the Colonel	Prof. Seltzman's machine	
Pumpkin Reports		"Mindswap"	Max, Goliath and Moonbeam	Brains being inside the wrong bodies	
Quack Pack		"Return of The T-Squad"	Dewey (in his superhero form) and Flight Attendant	Mind possession	
Quanto Mais Vida, Melhor!		Episodes from 84 until 133	Neném and Paula, Guilherme and Flávia	Death swaps magical books of life and their protective cases	
Rabbids Invasion		"Being Rabbid"	A Rabbid and John, then with Jessica		
Random! Cartoons		"Dr. Froyd's Funny Farm"	Lulu and Bossy LeCow		
Rapunzel's Tangled Adventure		"Plus Est En Vous"	Various characters and monkeys	Body switching Blaster	
Raven's Home		"Switch-or-Treat"	Booker and Raven; Aunt Maureen and Miles	Psychic powers	
The Real Ghostbusters		"Slimer, is that you?"	Egon and Slimer		
The Real Adventures of Jonny Quest		"Cyberswitch"	Race and Jeremiah	QuestWorld	
Red Dwarf		"Bodyswap"	Rimmer and Lister; Rimmer and the Cat	Rimmer's idea to help Lister and the Cat lose weight	
Red Oaks		"Body Swap"	David and Sam	Japanese liquor	
Regular Show		"Mordeby and Rigbecai"	Mordecai, Rigby, and Muscle Man	Machine (changed body parts)	
The Replacements		"A Buzzwork Orange"	Agent K and Dick Daring	Agent K Device	
Ressha Sentai ToQger		"Station 21: The Runaway Bride"	Right, Tokatti, Mio, Hikari and Miss Gritta	Spelled by Sabão Shadow	
Rick and Morty	2023	"The Jerrick Trap"	Rick and Jerry	Rick and Jerry die shortly after switching bodies, and are imperfectly revived with a mix of both personalities	
Robin Hood: Mischief in Sherwood		"Royal Lesson"	Lady Marian and Filcher	Magic	
Robocop: Alpha Commando		"The ERG and I"	Agent Nancy Miner and The Erg		
Robotboy		"RoboGus and the G-Machine"	Robotboy and Gus	AI chip	
Robotboy		"Nursing a Grudge"	Gus and a Dove	Brain transplant	
Robotboy		"The Old Switcharobot"	Robotboy and Protoboy	Switching of AI chips	
Robot Chicken		"High Caliber Euthanasia"	She-Ra/Princess Adora and Swift Wind/Spirit	Mind swap spell by Castaspella	
Robot Chicken		"Switchamaf**k!! The Movie!"	Blonde Mother and Goth Daughter and later a Snowman	Wish by a magical fortune cookie and then later a mechanical fortune teller	
Rolie Polie Olie		"Big Babies"	Olie and Spot; Babies and Parents	Machine	
Round the Twist		"IMU UMI"	Pete and Harold	Virtual reality gaming incident	
Sabrina the Teenage Witch (1970)		"When the Cat's Away"	Sabrina and Salem.	Sabrina's spell.	
Sabrina the Teenage Witch (1996)		"A Good Will Haunting"	Hilda and Zelda with some chickens.	Machine	
Sabrina: The Animated Series		"Generation Zap"	Sabrina and Enchantra	Wish on Salem's wish crystal	
Samurai Sentai Shinkenger		"Act 27: Switched Lives"	Chiaki and Abekonbe; Various humans and objects	Spell by Abekonbe	
The Sarah Silverman Program		"A Fairly Attractive Mind"	Brian and Steve	Magic dragon phone	
Saturday Night Live		"The Homocranial Mind Mixer"	Rosie O'Donnell, Richard Simmons, Ellen DeGeneres, Ryan Seacrest, George W. Bush and a dog	Bush's machine	
Saturday Night Live		"Sitcom Reboot"	Father and Son	Witch's spell; Premise of fictional Sitcom	
Saturday Night Live		The Switch"	Kim Kardashian and Aidy Bryant		
Saving Me		"Grounded"	Bennett Bramble and Nira Diggins	Machine	
Scaredy Squirrel		"Freaky Fur Day"	Scaredy and Dave	Magic coin	
The Scooby & Scrappy-Doo/Puppy Hour		"Who's Scooby-Doo?"	Scooby-Doo, Shaggy, and Bullies	Switch Machine	
Scream Street		"Body Swap"	Resus and Eefa's Bat	The Hoop of Horus	
Sealab 2021		"Brainswitch"	Dr. Quinn and Stormy Waters	Switching Brains	
The Secret Show		"And That's For Helsinki"	Victor and Anita	Flashback; Brain chunks switched	
The Secret World of Alex Mack		"The Switch"	Alex and Barbara	Barbara steps into Alex while she was in goo form	
Sesame Street		"When You Wish Upon A Pickle"	Chris and Elmo	Wish Pickle Machine	
Shadowhunters		"You Are Not Your Own"	Magnus and Valentine	Azazel's body swap spell	
Shake It Up		"Switch It Up"	CeCe and Flynn	Spell (Tinka's grandma's curse)	
Shaun the Sheep		"Cat Got Your Brain"	Shaun and Pidsley	Mind swap machine	
Sidekick		"Eric Amazing"	Eric and Allan Amazing		
The Silver Brumby		"Foals in Trouble"	Mopoke and Cullawong	Collided in mid-air and struck by lightning during a thunderstorm	
The Simpsons		"Holidays of Future Passed"	Carl and Lenny	Unknown	
The Simpsons	2026	"Treehouse of Horror XXXVII" ("Dog Boy Afternoon")	Bart and Santa's Little Helper	Lightning strikes grave	
Skatoony		"Body Swap"	Fernando, Dakota, Roland and Taylor later Chudd and Earl		
Smallville		"Transference"	Clark Kent and Lionel Luthor	Kryptonian artifact	
Smosh		"Food Battle 2012"	Ian Hecox and Anthony Padilla	Machine	
Smosh		"Jake Paul vs. Logan Paul"	Jake Paul and Logan Paul	Electricity from boxing gloves	
The Smurfs (1981)		"Turncoat Smurf"	Grouchy and Smurfette, Gargamel and Azrael	Magic potion	
The Smurfs (2021)		"Smurfing Places"	Papa Smurf and Gargamel	Spell from Gargamel	
The Smurfs (2021)		"Papa Smurf leaves the nest"	Papa Smurf and a Sparrow. Then Later with Willow, Brainy, Smurfette, Dimity, and Big mouth the Ogre. Then Big Mouth and a caterpillar	Potion mishap	
The Smurfs (2021)		"Hefty Baby"	Hefty and Baby, Baby and Papa Smurf	Potion Mishap	
Sonic Boom		"The Meteor"	Sonic and Doctor Eggman	Meteorite	
Speechless		"N-i-Nightmares on D-i-Dimeo S-Street"	Ray and Dylan	Dylan's dream	
Spider-Man		"The Living Brain"	Spider-Man and Doctor Octopus	Neuro-Cortex	
Spliced		"Whirrel Call"	Entrée and a Whirrel named Ed	Brains pop out of their bodies and bounce into each other's	
SpongeBob SquarePants	2026	"Plankton's Squeeze Play"	Squidward and Plankton	Fake clarinet	
Stargate Atlantis		"Duet"	Dr. Rodney McKay and Lt. Laura Cadman	A technical glitch	
Stargate Atlantis		"Identity"	Dr Jennifer Keller and Neeva Casol	Long-range communication device	
Stargate SG-1		"Holiday"	Ma'chello and Daniel Jackson, O'Neill and Teal'c	Mind-swapping machine	
Stargate SG-1		"Avalon Part 2 and origin"	Daniel Jackson and Harrid, Sallis and Vala	Long-range communication	
Stargate SG-1		"Crusade"	Daniel Jackson and Harrid, Sallis and Vala		
StarBeam		"Beachy Blunder"	Stella and Pickles	Trixie's Wand	
STARStreet		"Makeover Madness"	Sandi and Ashley	Hairdryers	
Star Trek		"Turnabout Intruder"	Kirk and Dr. Janice Lester	Alien Machine	
Star Trek: Strange New Worlds		"Spock Amok"	Spock and T'Pring	Vulcan Soul Sharing	
Star Trek: Prodigy		"Mindwalk"	Dal and Vice Admiral Janeway	Dal's Telepathic Abilities	
Star Trek: Voyager		"Vis à Vis"	Alien with Tom Paris, then Captain Janeway	Alien ability	
Star vs. the Forces of Evil		"Swim Suit"	Eclipsa and Rhombulus	Eclipsa's spell	
Strange Days at Blake Holsey High		"Brainwaves"	Lucas and Vaughn	Wormhole energy	
The Strange Chores		"Swap Back The Body Swap"	Charlie and a kettle, Pierce and a phone while Snorpe has stolen Helsing's body	Helsing's mind-swap ray	
The Stupendous Drew Pendous		"Super Drew Switcheroo"	Super Drew/Drew Pendous and Grace Cale	Switcheroo Machine	
Summer Camp Island		"Wild Hearts Can't Be Caboodled"	Oscar and his unicorn, Caboodle	Potion	
Summer in Transylvania		"It Lived in a Brain Jar!"	Doctor Farley and Leo; Summer and Leo		
Superboy		"Bodyswap"	Superboy and Lex Luthor		
The Super Mario Bros. Super Show!		"Cher's Poochie"	Mario and Cher's Dog	pizza transformer	
Supernatural		"Swap Meat"	Sam Winchester and a teenager	Spell	
Sushi Pack		"Every Body is Some Body"	Wasabi and Mayor Martin	Magic dust	
Taffy		"The Switch"	Taffy and Bentley	Lightning strikes	
TaleSpin		"A Baloo Switcheroo"	Baloo and Kit Cloudkicker; Rebecca Cunningham and Don Karnage; Mad Dog and Dumptruck	Magic idol	
Tales from the Crypt		"Judy, You're Not Yourself"	Old lady steals young woman's body	Magic medallion	
Talking Tom and Friends		"The Voice Switch"	Tom and Angela, later Ben, Hank, and Ginger	Ben's teleportation device // voices only	
Tattooed Teenage Alien Fighters from Beverly Hills		"Switch"	Laurie, Gordon, Drew and Swinton	The galactic sentinels accidentally switch genders by changing bodies and their lives during their fight with Voldek	
Taz-Mania		"The Outer Taz-Manian Zone"	Taz and Molly	Harmonic Convergence of the Taz-Manian Zone	
The 10th Kingdom			Prince Wendell and a dog	Evil Queen's spell	
Teen Titans		"Switched"	Starfire and Raven	Puppet King's spell	
Teenage Mutant Ninja Turtles (1987)		"The Old Switcheroo"	Shredder and Splinter	Lab accident	
Teenage Mutant Ninja Turtles (1987)		"Raphael Drives 'em Wild"	Raphael and a taxi driver	Machine	
Teenage Mutant Ninja Turtles (2012)		"Plan 10"	Raphael and a Kraang, April and Casey, Man and a Pigeon	Kraang Machine	
3-2-1 Penguins!		"Invasion of the Body Swappers"	Zidgel and Kevin	Galeezle mishap	
3rd Rock from the Sun		"Two-faced Dick"	Sally and Dick	Delayed approval of a previous request	
Theodosia		"In Her Shoes"	Theodosia and Safiya	a Powerful Spell	
The Tick (1994)		"Tick vs. Science"	Tick and Arthur, various characters	Machine	
Time Jam: Valerian & Laureline		"Tea Time"	Valerian and Laureline	Dr. Zessel's scheme	
Tiny Toon Adventures		"Washingtoon"	Plucky and Elmyra, Hamton and Dizzy	Toon Logic Extractor	
Tiny Toon Adventures		"Best of Buster Day"	Miss Conduct and a potato	Machine	
Tiny Toons Looniversity		"Spring Beak"	Hamton and Sweetie	Shirley's aura and a Solar eclipse	
Tokumei Sentai Go-Busters		"Mission 28: Beware of Chickens"	Hiromu, Yoko, Ryuji, Enter, Nick and the Buglars	Sprayloid 2's aerosol paint spray	
Tom and Jerry		"Switchin' Kitten"	Various characters	Experiment	
Totally Spies!		"Totally Switched"	Clover and Sir Jerry Lewis	Magic pendant / Only their personalities switch.	
Totally Spies!		"Totally Switched Again!"	Dr. Gray and Sir Jerry Lewis, Clover Andersson and Mrs. Lewis, others	Magic pendant, mind-swap blaster	
Totally Spies!		"A Dog Gone Day"	Sam and Poochie-Poo, Pickles and a Knight Armor Display	Pickles' Robot's Molecular Beam Transference	
Toxic Crusaders		"That's No Villain, That's My Mom!"	Dr. Killemoff and Mrs. Junko	Machine	
That Girl Lay Lay		"Freaky Fri-Day-Day"	Lay Lay and Sadie	Face-Swap app	
Thundarr The Barbarian		"Island of the Body Snatchers"	Ariel and a witch	spirits swap	
ThunderCats		"The Shifter"	Various characters	Vultureman device	
Transformers: Rescue Bots		"Switcheroo"	Chief Burns and Doc Greene, Kade and Heatwave, Cody and Boulder, Frankie and Chase, Dani and Blades	Space nebula	
Transformers: Robots in Disguise		"Disordered Personalities"	Bumblebee, Strongarm, Sideswipe, Drift and Grimlock	Combining experiment gone wrong	
Transformers: EarthSpark		"The Imposter And Spitfire"	Spitfire and Twitch	Struck by a lightning	
Trolls: The Beat Goes On!		"Switcher-Ruby"	Poppy and Branch	Magic ruby	
The Troop	2009	"Taming of The Cube"	Jake and Hayley	Magic gelatin cube	
The Troop		"The Prisoner of Lakewood"	Hayley and Monster	Ability of the monster	
True: Magical Friends		"True Switcheroo"	True and Bartelby	Crystal	
T.U.F.F. Puppy	2012	"Freaky Spy-Day"	Dudley and Kitty; Kitty and Snaptrap; Dudley and Jack Rabbit	Keswick's Mind Swapper	
Tutenstein		"Cleo's Catastrophe"	Cleo and Luxor	Scroll	
12 oz. Mouse		"INVICTUS"	Shark and Fitz	Mind-Swapping Chair	
The Twilight Zone (2019)		"The Who of You"	Harry and Jill		
Two Guys, a Girl and a Pizza Place		"Halloween 2: Mind Over Body"	Pete and Ashley, Berg and Sharon	Mad scientist	
2 Stupid Dogs		"Far-Out Friday"	Big Dog and Little Dog		
Ultimate Spider-Man		"Freaky"	Spider-Man and Wolverine	Mesmero's psychic powers	
Ultimate Spider-Man		"The Incredible Spider-Hulk"	Spider-Man and Hulk	Mesmero's psychic powers	
Ultimate Spider-Man		"The Avenging Spider-Man"	Spider-Man and Loki	Loki's spell	
Uncle Grandpa		"Haunted RV"	Uncle Grandpa, Mr. Gus, Pizza Steve, and Frankenstein	Brains go inside wrong bodies	
Vampirina		"Vampire Weekend"	Vee and Poppy	Moon pendant	
VeggieTales		"VeggieTown: Greetings from Bob and Larry #4"	Bob the Tomato and Larry the Cucumber	Vanishing Cream, reappearing in the wrong body	
Velma		"Till Death"	Velma and Daphne	Brain Switching Machine	
VH1 ILL-ustrated		"Episode 7"	George W. Bush and Jenna Bush	Fortune Cookie	
The View		"A Freaky View"	Sara Haines, Sunny Hostin, Joy Behar, Alyssa Farah Griffin, Ana Navarro, Brian Teta, Jamie Lee Curtis and Whoopi Goldberg	Earthquake	
Victor and Valentino		"Viclene"	Victor and Charlene	Magic necklace	
V.R. Troopers		"The Old Switcheroo"	Ryan and Jeb	Matter Transference Device	
VS Knight Lamune & 40 Fire				Crimson fog	
Wacky Races (2017)		"Swap Meet"	Dick Dastardly, Muttley, Penelope, Peter, Tiny, Bella, I. Q. and Brick	I.Q.'s Invention	
Wacky Races (2017)		"Uncle Dickie's Happy Sunshine Children's Hour"	C.A.R. and Tiny	I.Q.'s Invention	
Wandering Witch: The Journey of Elaina		"The Two Apprentices"	Elaina and Saya	Spell	
Warehouse 13		"Merge with Caution"	Pete and Myka	Artifact	
Wednesday		"Woe Thyself"	Wednesday and Enid	Magic	
We Baby Bears		"Witches"	Panda and Alice	Magic	
Where's Waldo? (2019)		"Vienna Voice-Versa"	Wizard Whitebeard and Arf, Odlulu and Fritz	Magic	
Wicked Science		"A Day in the Life"	Sasha and Russ	Toby's Invention	
Wild Grinders		"Preston Change-O"	Lil' Rob and Meaty	Spell by magician	
WITS Academy		"Switcherooed"	Ethan and Emily	Bottle with switcheroo spell	
Wizards Beyond Waverly Place		"Ain't Gnome Party Like a Wizard Party"	Milo and a garden gnome	Spell	
Wizards of Waverly Place		"Quinceañera"	Alex and her mom; various characters	Spells	
Wizards of Waverly Place		"Family Game Night"	Alex and Harper	Spells	
WordGirl		"Dr. WordGirl-Brains"	Becky Botsford/WordGirl and Dr. Two-Brains	Brain swap ray	
World of Quest		"The Body Switch"	Quest and Nestor	An accidental hit by Anna and Deceit during a battle	
Wansapanataym		"X-Deal"	The lawyer and his girlfriend	Car accident	
Wansapanataym		"Swapped!"	The man and the woman	Car accident	
Wansapanataym		"Fish Wish"	The girl and the fish		
Wansapanataym		"Swapped! Feat"			
Wansapanataym		"A Boy's Bestfriend"	The boy and his pet dog	Magic bracelet and Magic collar	
Wansapanataym		"Doggy, Daddy, Doggy"	The man and his pet dog	Motorcycle accident	
Wansapanataym		"Switch Be With You"	Pia and Upeng	Lightning strikes	
Wunschpunsch		"Mayor for a Day"	Bubonic and The Mayor, Maurizio and Jacob	Magic	
Xena: Warrior Princess		"Intimate Stranger"	Callisto and Xena	Spell by Ares	
The X-Files		"Lazarus"	FBI Agent and Criminal	Psychic transference	
The X-Files		"Dreamland"	Mulder and Morris Fletcher	Alien weapon	
Yes Boss		"Episode 1x352"	Meera and Mohan		
The Yogi Bear Show		"Yakky Doodle: "Mad Mix Up""	Yakky and Chopper	Brain Switch Machine	
Yogi's Treasure Hunt		"Beswitched Buddha'd and Bewildered"	Yogi Bear and Boo Boo; Huckleberry Hound and Quick Draw McGraw; Snooper and Blabber; Ranger Smith and Snagglepuss; Augie Doggie and Doggie Daddy; later Dick Dastardly and Muttley	Mind-swapping machine	
Yonderland		"Swapsies"	Debbie and Elf	Portal malfunction	
Yin Yang Yo!		"Yin Yang Carl"	Carl and Master Yo	Magic ability	
Yvon of the Yukon		"The Siamese Twits"	Tommy and Yvon	Wish during Aurora Borealis	
Zevo-3		"Mootant"	Matt and a mutant cow	Machine malfunction	
Zig & Sharko		"Me, Myself and I"	Zig and Sharko		
Zyuden Sentai Kyoryuger (Power Rangers Dino Super Charge)		"Brave 37: Revenge! The Ghost Deboth Army" (Freaky Fightday)	Daigo, Ian, Nobuharu, Souji, Amy and Utsusemimaru; Torin and Debo Kibishydesu (Tyler, Shelby, Koda, Chase, Riley, and Ivan, Singe, Vivix, Zenowing and Professor Strickler)	Spell by Debo Akkumoon using the Strange Bedpillow (Spell by Nightmare using Professor Strickler's switch eraser) (Note: The "Brave 37: Revenge! The Ghost Deboth Army" episode in Zyuden Sentai Kyoryuger was remade as the Freaky Fightday episode in Power Rangers Dino Super Charge)	

== Anime episodes featuring a body swap ==
List of anime episodes featuring body swaps
Title	Episode	Year (Note: Indicates the year the graphic novel or tankōbon was published rather than the issue.)	Characters	Method / notes
The 100 Girlfriends Who Really, Really, Really, Really, Really Love You	Episode 1 "His Name"	2025	All the Girls	Kusuri's failed drug
Animal Yokochō	Episode 97 "Doki☆Doki Volume: Ami And Iyo's Big Misunderstanding"	2006	Ami and Iyo	
Ape Escape	Episode 11	2006	Kakeru and Natsumi	Malfunctioning machine
BanG Dream! Girls Band Party! Pico	Episode 16 "Poppin' Shuffle"	2018	Multiple characters	Falling off the stairs
Beelzebub	Episode 50 "Today I'm Different on the Inside"	2012	Oga and Beelzebub IV	the Aftereffects of Super Milk Time
Beyond the Boundary	Episode 4 "Accused Kanbara Yayoi"	2013-2014	Akihito and Yayoi	Punishment for Yayoi
Brave Beats	Episode 19 "I Saw It! Maito's Heart is a Mystery!"	2015-2016	Multiple characters	
Busou Shinki	Episode 13	2012	Ines and a Strarf's Chassis	
Cardcaptor Sakura	Episode 32 "Sakura, Kero, and Syaoran"	2000	Syaoran and Kero	Change card
Charlotte	Full Series	2015		Main character's power
Cop Craft	Episode 8-9 "Smells Like Toon Spirits" "A King Maker"	2019	Tilarna and her cat	Magical crossbow
Crayon Shin-Chan	Episode 3 "Trading Faces!"	1992	Shin-Chan and Misae	Collided heads
Daphne in the Brilliant Blue	OVA 2 "Heaven Can Wait For Maia Mizuki"	2004	Gloria and Maia	Magic vending machine
A Dark Rabbit Has Seven Lives	OVA "School Attendance Day"	2011	Multiple characters	Magic potion
Dog Days	Episode 24 "Change My Heart"	2012	Cinque, Millhiore, Yukikaze and the Irekaekodama	Spell by the Irekaekodama
Doraemon	Episode 14 "The Switching Rope"	2005	Nobita, Shizuka and others	Swapping Rope
Dragon Ball Z	Episode 71 "Goku is Ginyu and Ginyu is Goku"	1989-1996	Goku and Ginyu, then Ginyu and a Frog	Ginyu's "Body Change" Technique
Dragon Ball Z	Episode 89 "Frieza's Boast"	1989-1996	Ginyu and Bulma	Ginyu's "Body Change" Technique
Dragon Ball Z	Episode 91 "Embodiment of Fire"	1989-1996	Ginyu and Bulma	Ginyu's "Body Change" Technique
The Duke of Death and His Maid	Episode 3 "The Duke, Alice, and Mother and Mother"	2024	Bocchan and Alice	Magic
Excel Saga	Episode 26 "Going Too Far"		Excel and Hyatt	
Fairy Tail	Episode 19 "Changeling"	2010	Natsu and Loke, Gray and Lucy, Erza and Happy	Changeling magic
Fairy Tail	Episode 37 "Master Enchant"	2018	Wendy and Irene	Enchantment
Fresh Pretty Cure!	Episode 10 "Tart is Inori, Inori is Tart!?"	2009	Inori and Tarte, various humans and animals	Spell by the Nakewameke
Galaxy Angel Z	Episode 11	2002	Multiple characters	Woke up swapped.
GeGeGe no Kitarō (2018)	Episode 38 "New Year's Man-Eating Fable Kasha"	2018	Kasha, Nezumi Otoko, Neko Musume, and Kitarō	Kasha's Yokai Magic
Gintama	Episode 287 "He's The Sweet Tooth, and I'm the Mayo Guy"	2015	Gintoki and Hijikata	Broken Machine/Hit by truck
Girls Bravo	Episode 12 "Girls Bravo"	2005	Fukuyama and Yukinari, Kirie and Miharu	Spell by Lisa
Good Luck Girl!	Episode 10	2012	Momiji and Ichiko	Gadget of Misfortune: Substitution Bandage
Happy Lesson	Episode 11	2002	Multiple characters	Machine struck by lightning
Jewelpet Sunshine	Episode 29	2011	Ruby and Kanon	Collided heads
Jewelpet Twinkle☆	Episode 21 "Which is Which Doki☆Doki!"	2010	Miria and Sara	Incorrectly mixed potion
JoJo's Bizarre Adventure Part 5: Golden Wind	Episode 34 "The Requiem Quietly Plays, Part 1"	2019	Mista and Trish, Giorno and Narancia, Diavolo and Bucciarati	The Arrow
Kämpfer	Episode 12 "Christmas ～The Miracle of the Entrails Dolls～"	2011	the Kampfer Girls and their Messengers	Woke up swapped.
Kimagure Orange Road	OVA 3 "Wagahai wa Neko de Attari Osakana de Attari"	1989	Multiple characters	Magic rope
Kirakira Pretty Cure a la Mode	Episode 34 "A Little Grudge Match! Cat Yukari vs. Fairy Kirarin!"	2017	Yukari Kotozume and her Crystal Animal	Head bump
Kochikame	Episode 313 "I'm Reiko and I'm Ryuou-chan?!"	2004	Ryotsu and Reiko	Machine
Kokoro Connect	Episode 1–5	2012	Multiple characters	Heartseed
KonoSuba: God's Blessing on This Wonderful World!	Episode 5 "Nefarious Friends for This Sheltered Princess!"	2024	Kazuma and Iris	Spell written on a necklace
Koro Sensei Quest	Episode 8 "Big Bad Switcheroo"	2016	Multiple characters	Trap Chest
Lagrange: The Flower of Rin-ne	Episode 5 "In Orbit Above the Summer Skies of Kamogawa"	2012	Madoka & Yurikano	Machine dream
Mamotte! Lollipop	Episode 8 "Nina is Zero and Zero is Nina!?"	2006	Nina and Zero	
MÄR	Episode 90 "Oblivious Clavier"	2005-2007	Loco and The General	Exchange Mirror
Mashin Hero Wataru	Episode 30 "I am Himiko and Himiko is Me?"	1997-1998	Multiple characters	Woke up swapped.
Miracle Girls	Episode 13 "The Mysterious Migratory Love Cyclone"	1993	Tomomi and Mikage Matsunaga	Magic bracelets
Natsuiro Kiseki	Episode 4 "Yuka At Full Tilt"	2012	Yuka and Saki, Natsumi and Rinko	Magical rock
Ojamajo Doremi Sharp	Episode 44	2000-2001	Doremi and Hadzuki	Magical girl spell
One Piece	Punk Hazard Arc	2013	Sanji, Nami, Franky, Chopper, Tashigi and Smoker	Ope-Ope Fruit used by Trafalgar Law
Powerpuff Girls Z	Episode 41 "Trading Faces"	2009	The girls	
Pokémon Horizons – The Search for Laqua	Episode 24 "Roy is Crocalor, and Crocalor is Roy!"	2024-2025	Roy and Crocalor	Synchro Machine
PriPri Chi-chan!!	Episode 8 "Sparkle! I'm Non-Chan, And I Love to Decorate, Non!"	2017	Non-Chan and Yuka	Magic hammer
Psychic Squad	Episode 17 "Survival of the Fittest! We're Gonna Eat You!"	2008-2009	Kaoru and Akira	Akira's power
Rascal Does Not Dream	Episode 9–10	2018	Mai and Nodoka	Puberty Syndrome
Rock Lee & His Ninja Pals	Episode 23 "Naruto is Lee and Lee is Naruto!" - "I Dream of Walking With the Nine-tails!"	2012	Lee and Naruto	Ino's Mind-Body Switch Jutsu
Sgt. Frog	Episode 85 "Keroro, Turn Once and Switch Bodies"		Keroro and Natsumi	Random Capsule Toys Machine
Sgt. Frog	Episode 276 "Keroro, the admiral attacks/Giroro, it's this zipper"		Kururu and Akina, Keroro's mother and Natsumi	Random Capsule Toys Machine
Sgt. Frog	Episode 316 "Momoka, I'm the sergeant?"		Momoka and Keroro, Tamama and Fuyuki	Random Capsule Toys Machine
Shakugan no Shana	OVA 1 "Reshuffle"	2009	Yuji and Shana	Cursed Telescope
Smile PreCure!	Episode 8 "Miyuki and Candy Switch Places!?"	2012	Miyuki and Candy	Majorina's magic rings
Stitch!	Season 3 (Best Friends Forever), Episode 20 "Swapper 2.0"	2013	Stitch and Takumi (Hiroman)	Experiment 355 (Swapper)
Stop!! Hibari-kun!	Episode 33 "Pandemonium!! Hibari is Kousaku, Kousaku is Hibari"	1983	Hibari and Kousaku	Dream
Strike the Blood	Episode 13-14 "Labyrinth of the Blue Witch"	2013-2014	Kojou and Yuuma	Yuuma's Spell
Sugar Sugar Rune	Episode 15 "The Contrary Macaroon Pandemonium!?"	2005	Chocolat and Vanilla	Magic biscuits
Super GALS!	Episode 40 "Ran-pyon ♥ Dizzy → Becomes Sayo?!"	2001-2002	Dizzy and Sayo	Magical Soccer Ball
Teekyuu	Episode 8 "Face/Off with Senpai"	2016	Yuri and Marimo	Woke up swapped.
TenPuru	Special 1 "No Way, Why Is It So Big..."	2023	Multiple characters	Woke up swapped.
To Love Ru Darkness	OVA 3 "Exchange"	2012-2015	Rito and Haruna	Lala's Round-Round Change-Kun Body-Swapping Machine
Tropical-Rouge! Pretty Cure	Episode 15 "Minori is Laura, Laura is Minori?!"	2021-2022	Minori and Laura	Mermaid Aqua Pot
Tropical-Rouge! Pretty Cure	Episode 33 "Viva! Tropica-Shine In 10 Stories!"	2021-2022	Manatsu, Sango, Minori, Asuka, Laura, Kururin, Chongire and Chou Zettai Yaraneeda	Clashing
Tsuyokiss	Episode 12 "Nice To Meet You Again! I'm Sunao Konoe!"	2006	Kinu and Nagomi	Fell Down the Stairs
Tying the Knot with an Amagami Sister	Episode 18 "Nadeshiko Hide-and-Seek ~Switch~"	2025	Uryuu and Yuna	Wish at a shrine
Urusei Yatsura	Episode 24 "Beware of Earmuffs!"	1981-1986	Ataru, Ten and Sakura	Magical earmuffs
VS Knight Ramune & 40 Fire	Episode 18 "Who am I"	1996	Multiple characters	Body Swap Smoke Screen
Yadamon	Episode 105	1992-1993	Yadamon and Salmon	Transformation spell
Yamada-kun and the Seven Witches	Full Series	2015	Multiple characters	Shiraishi's witch kiss
Yawaraka Sangokushi Tsukisase!! Ryofuko-chan	Episode 4	2007-2008	Ryofuko and Koujun	Collided heads
Yo-kai Watch	Episode 200 "Flying Komasan and the Wishing World Adventure, Zura!"	2014-2018	Keita and Inaho	Wish to Komasan
Yu-Gi-Oh! Zexal	"Episode 107: Yuma Confused!? The Unreliable Account of Girag the Tanuki" (Furry Fury)	2013	Yuma, Girag and Ponta	Spell by Ponta
