= List of Some Assembly Required (2014 TV series) episodes =

Some Assembly Required is a teen comedy series that is streamed on Netflix (season 1) and Amazon Prime Video (season 3). YTV created the series and aired it in Canada. 57 episodes aired over three seasons before the series was cancelled.

== Series overview ==
Season	Episodes	Originally released	
Season	Episodes	First released	Last released
1	26	January 6, 2014	August 26, 2014
2	18	January 5, 2015	February 1, 2016
3	13	March 14, 2016	June 6, 2016

== Episodes ==
=== Season 1 (2014) ===
No. overall	No. in season	Title	Directed by	Written by	Original air date
1	1	"Strong Suit"	Adam Weissman	Dan Signer & Howard Nemetz	January 6, 2014
Jarvis Raines is an average teenager who becomes the CEO of toy company Knickknack Toys overnight after he sues them over a defective chemistry set that blows up his house. He recruits his friends from school to help him run the company, namely tech expert Piper Gray, jokester Bowie Sherman, popular girl Geneva Hayes, daredevil Malcolm "Knox" Knoxford III, and fashion designer Aster Vanderberg. He also hires Mrs. Bubkes, a foreign cleaning lady, who is actually the former CEO of Knickknack Toys, Candace Wheeler, in disguise. Together, the team create their first toy, the "Strong Suit". Unfortunately, the kid testing the suit decides to keep it and traps the team inside the building when they try to retrieve it. Eventually, Piper calibrates a remote to control the suit and they get it back.
2	2	"Philharmonica"	Adam Weissman	Jennica Harper	January 13, 2014
The kids from Knickknack are met by the owner of Melody Burger, who had a previous arrangement with Candace for her to develop a toy for their kid's meals. However, Mr. Melody refuses to do business with the company now that Candace is gone, so the kids masquerade as Melody Burger employees to prove themselves. Meanwhile, Bowie tries to catch Mmmboing, a ball he had created designed to bounce forever.
3	3	"Pants Full of Ants"	Jon Rosenbaum	Dan Signer & Howard Nemetz	January 20, 2014
After Jarvis discovers Piper performing a love song called "Jarvis", she tries to hide her crush on him, with some help from Aster.
4	4	"Rainbow Bunny"	Adam Weissman	Ryan W. Smith & Nathaniel Moher	January 27, 2014
After Geneva orders 1,000,000 Rainbow Bunnies, the crew decide to make a web show to encourage kids to buy them off of them, and try to convince a famous action movie star to promote the product. Meanwhile, Piper tries to take the worst photo of Geneva possible. Guest star: Paul Lazenby as Chase Runner
5	5	"Kick the Can"	Steven Wright	Meredith Hambrock	February 3, 2014
A man claiming to be P. Everett Knicknack comes to the company, and tells the gang the story of how the company was founded. Meanwhile, Knox thinks that cans can feel pain and tries to collect every can in the building, but Piper is unimpressed.
6	6	"Cupid's Bow"	Steven Wright	Ryan W. Smith & Nathaniel Moher	February 10, 2014
Piper hits Jarvis with her Cupid's Bow but it results with a lot of confusion. Meanwhile, Geneva is constantly being chased by boys on Valentine’s Day, so she asks Mrs. Bubkes to help make her look uglier.
7	7	"Dance Crew Evolution"	Jon Rosenbaum	Cole Bastedo & Jennifer Siddle	February 17, 2014
After getting tired from dancing too much, P. Everett Knicknack faints, and Jarvis and Piper think he is dead so they make him a funeral. Meanwhile, Bowie wants to join Geneva’s dance team, so Aster offers him a pair of shoes that make him automatically dance whenever he hears music.
8	8	"Angie"	Adam Weissman	Jennica Harper	February 24, 2014
One of KnickKnack Toys' top sellers, the Angie doll, is celebrating its 75th anniversary, so Jarvis has an idea to remodel her figure by holding a beauty pageant. Piper hates the idea and tracks down Angie's inspiration to stop it. Meanwhile, Geneva gets her fingernail caught in one of Aster’s printers, breaking it and ruining her hand. Aster attempts to fix her hand, but all of his techniques only make it worse.
9	9	"Snack in the Box"	Jon Rosenbaum	Dan Signer & Howard Nemetz	March 3, 2014
When the annual toy convention is in town, Jarvis attempts to prove Geneva's usefulness by putting her in charge of designing the product. But she creates a nightmarish toy, forcing Jarvis to save face. Meanwhile, Candace wants to steal the toy, so she distracts Bowie by having him and Mrs. Bubkes go undercover.
10	10	"Lobster Trap"	Adam Weissman	Dan Signer & Howard Nemetz	March 10, 2014
Bowie creates something where kids can control video games with their minds but it results in Jarvis and Knox thinking they're characters in the game. Meanwhile, Geneva and Aster think Mrs. Bubkes is lonely, so they hook her up on a date with Mr. Gournisht, another man from Mrs. Bubkes’ home country of Meeskatania.
11	11	"Teeny Toddler Chemistry Set"	Jon Rosenbaum	Dan Signer & Howard Nemetz	March 17, 2014
A young boy comes to the company saying that their chemistry set blew up his house. He tricks Jarvis into letting him stay. Later, Aster tricks Geneva to buying all the chemistry sets in the store but all she bought were clothes so Aster goes. But he just buys clothes too. Then they go together but they maxed out the company's credit card. Later, Piper finds a place called ToyLand that is similar to the place. Later, they find out that only 5,000 of the sets were shipped, and there were only 4,999 left, meaning that this kid was lying. He gets kicked out. Then Bowie's face is blown up and he sues Jarvis and becomes the new owner of the company. Guest star: Ryan Grantham as Logan
12	12	"Moosetrap"	Steve Wright	Ryan W. Smith & Nathaniel Moher	March 24, 2014
Bowie is now the new owner of the company and completely redesigns it by making it a mousetrap manufacturer and firing Jarvis. So in order to get his job back, Jarvis poses as the new secretary.
13	13	"Flycycle"	Jon Rosenbaum	Cole Bastedo & Jennifer Siddle	April 7, 2014
When Bowie is given the task of creating a flying bicycle, he blanks out and must come up with something. Meanwhile, Mrs. Bubkes is in danger of fighting in the Meeskatanian war, so Jarvis and Piper dress up as her children so she has an excuse.
14	14	"Ricky Van Felt"	Howard Nemetz	Dan Signer & Howard Nemetz	April 14, 2014
The toy company is given an offer for a little kid show Tickletown, but Jarvis is afraid of puppets. Then Mrs. Bubkes gets an evil puppet to make Jarvis look bad. Meanwhile, Knox and Bowie try to find a bikini commercial Geneva was in.
15	15	"Flyrates"	Steve Wright	Dan Signer & Howard Nemetz	April 21, 2014
Jarvis and Piper make their own game, Flyrates, and promote it at GameCon. Piper's stand doesn't catch anyone's interest, until Jarvis and Bowie dress up as pirates and fight with each other. Meanwhile, Geneva fights fake ghosts with a new game.
16	16	"Fat Cat"	Jon Rosenbaum	Jennica Harper	April 28, 2014
Candace steals the Fat Cat money that Jarvis needs for the Fat Cat Tournament and she stores it in the bank so the crew has to rob the bank to get it back.
17	17	"Sidekick"	Steve Wright	Dan Signer & Howard Nemetz	May 5, 2014
The crew pitch in ideas for a new line of superheroes and they explain what their superheroes would be. Ideas include an animal-themed superhero created by Piper, a fashion designer hero pitched by Aster, and an action figure that transforms into a superhero that Jarvis came up with.
18	18	"Presto Pack"	Steve Wright	Ryan W. Smith & Nathaniel Moher	May 12, 2014
Magicians hunt down Jarvis after he exposes a secret of a magician. Meanwhile, Piper asks Mrs. Bubkes to help her build a new chair she bought.
19	19	"Very Scary Fairy Tales"	Siohban Devine	Dan Signer & Howard Nemetz	May 19, 2014
After Jarvis mistakenly loses Bowie's invitation to Geneva's party, he gets him to dress up as Cinderella but it backfires. Piper gets Knox to read a book of evil fairy tales.
20	20	"Realm of Raiders"	Milo Shandel	Dan Signer & Howard Nemetz	May 26, 2014
Piper defeats Alphadog, the world's most famous video game player in the world, giving her great attention. Alphadog shows up to meet Piper, but, much to Piper's surprise, Alphadog turns out to be a girl that Jarvis wants to ask out. However, Jarvis and Piper have a practice date (before a real one) and, with the advice of Aster, Piper tells Jarvis the opposite of what girls like but stops when Jarvis asks to kiss. But just as she is about to kiss him, Alphadog comes and he gets busted. Meanwhile, Aster gets addicted to a video game, and Bowie tries to help him snap out of it.
21	21	"Dr. KnickKnack's Medical Bag"	Siobhan Devine	Dan Signer & Howard Nemetz	July 22, 2014
Candace, fed up with pretending to be Mrs. Bubkes, asks Jarvis for a second chance and Jarvis reluctantly hires her—to be Mrs. Bubkes's assistant. But when Bowie tells Jarvis a little girl saved her sister's life using a toy designed when Candace was in charge of KnickKnack, she sees it as an opportunity to get back on top. Meanwhile, Piper loses an auction because of Geneva. She wants a Pretty Mini Pony toy that she wanted as a kid, so Geneva gives her a Pretty Mini Pony; not the toy, but Geneva’s actual pet pony.
22	22	"Pop Superstar"	Jon Rosenbaum	Dan Signer & Howard Nemetz	July 29, 2014
When Pop superstar Caden Clark hides from a crowd of crazed fans at KnickKnack Toys, he becomes hooked on KnickKnack's video game "Pop Superstar" and decides to quit being a Pop superstar to become a professional "Pop Superstar" player. Jarvis and Piper must figure out how to get Caden to perform at his concert that night. Meanwhile, Mrs. Bubkes tricks Knox into doing all of her work at KnickKnack. Guest star: Calum Worthy as Caden Clark
23	23	"Gizmospinatron"	Siobhan Devine	Cole Bastedo	August 5, 2014
While having a nap at work, Jarvis dreams up the world's greatest toy. Unfortunately, he forgets what it is as soon as he wakes up. In an attempt to help Jarvis remember what the toy was, Piper, Bowie, and Aster try to recreate Jarvis's day so he'll have the exact same dream—while maybe implanting a few ideas of their own. Jarvis later realizes that the toy he dreamed of was a yo-yo. Meanwhile, Knox gets free clothes because he took a video of himself doing a skateboard stunt wearing Epic Thunder's clothes and posted it online. Geneva wants free clothes from Isabella Stracciatella, so she tries to do dangerous stunts and eventually has Knox fill in for her as a stunt double.
24	24	"Mmmbomb"	Adam Weissman	Dan Signer & Howard Nemetz	August 12, 2014
Mmmboing causes an uproar when he bounces into Prime Minister Davenport on national TV. Davenport tracks the perpetual motion machine to its creator, Bowie, and gives the gang a choice: either Bowie goes to jail for assaulting the Prime Minister—or they can help him use Mmmboing's technology for his own purposes. Meanwhile, Candace tries to get the password of Geneva's computer that has designs on the hard drive, so she poses as a fashion photographer to get her to reveal her password. Guest star: Milo Shandel as Prime Minister Davenport
25	25	"Everyball"	Adam Weissman	Dan Signer & Howard Nemetz	August 19, 2014
When Jarvis buys commercial time during the Super Bowl, he gets two tickets, so Bowie, Piper, Geneva, and Knox all compete for the right to go with him.
26	26	"Junior Fish Gutter"	Howard Nemetz	Jennica Harper	August 26, 2014
To find out if Jarvis has real feelings for her, Piper pretends she's been offered a new job at a toy company far, far away. Meanwhile, Bowie eats a moldy slice of pizza and thinks he is a cartoon.

=== Season 2 (2015−16) ===
No. overall	No. in season	Title	Directed by	Written by	Original air date
27	1	"Bouncy Pants"	Milo Shandel	Ryan W. Smith & Nathaniel Moher	January 5, 2015
When KnickKnack runs out of money because of Everyball causing everyone not to buy any of their soccer balls, baseballs, volleyballs, etc., Jarvis considers partnering with Candace. But in order to do that, Candace needs him to fire someone to prove he's ruthless. Meanwhile, Aster needs help from Knox after a blackout after riding the roller coaster.
28	2	"Ruff Rider"	Howard Nemetz	Ryan W. Smith & Nathaniel Moher	January 12, 2015
When Jarvis holds a contest for dogs, and it includes a prize that Piper wants, she is willing to do anything to get it—even enter the competition. Meanwhile, Bowie and Knox decide to teach Mrs. Bubkes English lessons.
29	3	"Just Like a Baby"	Siobhan Devine	Jennica Harper	January 19, 2015
When Mrs. Bubkes finds out that the kids would do anything to help a pregnant woman, she pretends to be pregnant so the kids will do her work for her. Meanwhile, Bowie and Knox decide to make a realistic baby doll, but take advantage of it when a cute girl asks Bowie to a playdate. Guest star: Emily Tennant as Isabelle
30	4	"Samurai Salamanders"	Milo Shandel	Dan Signer & Howard Nemetz	January 26, 2015
Jarvis, Bowie, Knox, and Geneva dress up as the Samurai Salamanders to promote their new doll, but when a kid asks them for help when a gang of bikers steals his doll, the gang must work together to stop the bikers. Meanwhile, Aster is looking for a guy to model his clothes that he sewed to be in a magazine. He decides to ask Piper to model the clothes. Guest star: Christian Michael Cooper as Max, Trevor Lerner as Timmy
31	5	"Brrrzooka"	Howard Nemetz	Dan Signer & Howard Nemetz	February 2, 2015
After Mrs. Bubkes becomes vice-president of KnickKnack Toys, Candace plans to sabotage their latest toy, but little does she know that Piper, jealous of being passed over, is also seeking revenge. Elsewhere, Bowie gets locked inside the hood of Geneva’s car desk and when he asks her to let him out, she thinks he’s a talking car. Bowie uses it to try and get a kiss from her.
32	6	"Cardboard Box"	Raugi Yu	Dan Signer & Howard Nemetz	March 16, 2015
After Geneva takes control of a band that Piper creates, Piper ends up quitting her own band. Meanwhile, Knox tricks Aster into becoming a safety tester for some of KnickKnack’s most dangerous toys.
33	7	"Flurf"	Siohban Devine	Dan Signer & Howard Nemetz	March 23, 2015
When Jarvis sells mattresses made out of "Flurf", super-soft material from Candace's fat suit for Mrs. Bubkes, he accidentally lands himself in a war with Mel's Mattress Kingdom, another mattress company. To end this war "The Mattress King" says that Piper has to go on a date with his son. Once it's revealed that he's fun and cool Jarvis gets jealous. Meanwhile, Aster becomes a landlord for a dollhouse, and Geneva is one of his tenants.
34	8	"Littlefoot"	Siohban Devine	Dan Signer & Howard Nemetz	March 30, 2015
After Bowie posts a video of Aster in a fur suit trying to get in a garbage bin to retrieve something of his, viewers mistake him for the creature Littlefoot. Jarvis then creates a line of Littlefoot toys. Meanwhile, Knox tries to convince Piper to adapt his carefree attitude about life.
35	9	"Wind-Up Robot"	Milo Shandel	Nadiya Chettiar	April 6, 2015
Jarvis, Bowie, Piper, and Knox try to find a million-dollar toy that is somewhere in the building. Geneva teaches ballet lessons to Mrs. Bubkes.
36	10	"Kooky-Dough"	Jon Rosenbaum	Dan Signer & Howard Nemetz	April 13, 2015
When Candace decides to send an inspector over to KnickKnack, Jarvis makes all of the company super-safe. But there's one thing he doesn't take account of: an ever-expanding, man-eating blob that Geneva creates with a toy called "Kooky-Dough" and yeast. Elsewhere, Bowie has to control Knox’s urge for extreme sports until the company passes the safety inspection.
37	11	"Greedy Pig"	Milo Shandel	Cole Bastedo	April 20, 2015
KnickKnack releases a new toy: Greedy Pig, the piggy bank that makes saving fun! But when the gang discovers the money that kids are saving in their Greedy Pigs is somehow disappearing, it's time for a stakeout to find the thief. Meanwhile, Bowie decides to create fake copies of Geneva’s favorite magazine in order to get a kiss from her.
38	12	"Stinky Face"	Jon Rosenbaum	Jennica Harper	April 27, 2015
Dissatisfied with how she's treated, Piper goes undercover as a blonde to prove it's really true that blondes have more fun. Meanwhile, Jarvis, Bowie, and Knox go on set to Chase Runner’s new movie and convince him to advertise their new Stinky Face product, but he’ll only do it if Bowie is cast in his movie.
39	13	"Rocket with a Pocket"	Ken Friss	Jennica Harper	July 13, 2015
KnickKnack releases a new toy called Rocket With A Pocket and everything is going well until a little girl puts her baby sister in the rocket. Meanwhile, Geneva and Knox destroy Aster’s sewing machine and have to fix it before he notices. Produced as episode 40. Aired as episode 39 in Canada.
40	14	"Snappo"	Ken Friss	Cole Bastedo & Jennifer Siddle	16 October 2015 (Netflix) January 4, 2016 (TV)
The owner of the prestigious toy line Snappo, Tobias, arrives from Denmark and offers to sell Snappo to KnickKnack for $25,000. Candace overhears the conversation and attempts to steal the deal. However Tobias is actually a con-artist, and when his scheme succeeds on one of the two sides, the two sides are forced to unite and attempt to con the con-artist. Meanwhile, Bowie and Aster discover that Mmmboing is a talented artist and use him to make paintings, but start to overwork him. Produced as episode 39. Aired as episode 39 on Netflix. Guest star: Edward Witzke as Tobias
41	15	"The Shnorfs"	Jon Rosenbaum	Ryan W. Smith & Nathaniel Moher	16 October 2015 (Netflix) January 11, 2016 (TV)
Piper decides to create an updated set of Shnorfs that can talk and communicate with each other, using the KnickKnack employees as the models. Meanwhile Bowie decides to put together a video showing all the team as kids, forcing Candace to find a young orphan, Adelaide, to play her as a kid, but the making of the home video forces Candace to face a side she hasn't shown before. Guest star: Chelsea Miller as Adelaide
42	16	"Award Show in a Box"	Howard Nemetz	Dan Signer & Howard Nemetz	16 October 2015 (Netflix) January 18, 2016 (TV)
Moviestar Jazlyn Sims comes to KnickKnack to try to get a custom dress for an upcoming awards show. Jarvis pretends that he made the designs and then must find a way to convince Aster to make the dress. Elsewhere Bowie mistakenly thinks Piper has fallen in love with him, and Geneva hears Mrs. Bubkes speaking in Candace’s voice and thinks she is a great impressionist. Guest stars: Vanessa Morgan as Jazlyn Simms & Kai Dolmans as Little Girl
43	17	"K-Kube"	Adam Weissman	Dan Signer & Howard Nemetz	16 October 2015 (Netflix) January 25, 2016 (TV)
When Geneva breaks the K-Kube world record, Jarvis decides to sponsor a competition to make the record official between Geneva and Q-Bot. Meanwhile Jarvis acknowledges Piper as being a girl after seeing her with Bowie. Piper thinks it's because her and Bowie were on a date, but when Bowie decides to break up with Piper, Piper must figure out a way to convince him to stay with her so she can win Jarvis's heart.
44	18	"Taste Buds"	Heather Hawthorn-Doyle	Dan Signer & Howard Nemetz	16 October 2015 (Netflix) February 1, 2016 (TV)
Jarvis and Geneva are scheduled to participate in a local parade as Boyfriend and Girlfriend Sprinkle until Geneva is injured by Bowie. Meanwhile Piper confronts Bowie on whether or not he was telling the truth when he told her that Jarvis was in love with her only to take Geneva's place as Girlfriend Sprinkle. Knox meets a Meeskatanian girl, Tsouris, that he falls in love with and asks Mrs. Bubkes for advice. Jarvis confesses to Bowie he likes Piper, but it's after Bowie has told Piper he lied about Jarvis liking her, making the two question each other's feelings. Guest star: Abby Ross as Tsouris

=== Season 3 (2016) ===
No. overall	No. in season	Title	Directed by	Written by	Original release date
45	1	"Raindrop Rabbit"	Ken Friss	Dan Signer & Howard Nemetz	March 14, 2016
An unusual trip as Captain Bowie heads south when he crashes outside of Meeskatania and is asked by Jarvis to investigate the Knickknack knockoff Knockknock. Meanwhile Piper signs up as a counselor for a teen helpline hoping to find a way to overcome her feelings for Jarvis. Guest star: Jedidiah Goodacre as Felix, Abby Ross as Tsouris, Ombu Ance as Kid
46	2	"Dig it Dragon"	Siobhan Devine	Dan Signer & Howard Nemetz	March 21, 2016
When Bowie hears that Jarvis is down in the dumps, he takes it literally and uncovers an old Knickknack toy to update- Dig it Dragon. Meanwhile Piper's new boyfriend ends up supporting the strangest causes leading to a breakup, but things continue to role South for her when Bowie accidentally helps Aster confess his feelings of love for her. Guest star: Brenda M. Crichlow as MaryAnne, Jedidah Goodacre as Felix, Chelsea Miller as Adelaide
47	3	"Tinosaur"	Siobhan Devine	Dan Signer & Howard Nemetz	March 28, 2016
Knox's father visits Knickknack to see how his son Knox, the company President, operates. Jarvis agrees to play along, but soon the entire company is crazy when the entire staff is given positions of responsibility that are their weaknesses. If that weren't enough Piper creates a new toy- the tinosaur from the DNA of a T-Rex and Aster, but things get chaotic when her sweat gets added to the mixture turning the tinosaur into a ferocious flesh craving beast. Guest star: Peter Keleghan as Malcolm Knoxford II
48	4	"Wreck & Roll"	Howard Nemetz	Dan Signer & Howard Nemetz	April 4, 2016
Piper creates a new toy guitar that can be broken and reassembled, but when she tries to get into the Violently Ill concert and show it to lead singer Charles Nelson Vomit she runs into some problems. Meanwhile Jarvis decides to get a tattoo of Piper's name to show his love for her, but when he learns she may not like the tattoo he turns it into a scheme to illustrate he loves bagpipes and plumbing. Guest star: Ray Boulay as Charles Nelson Vomit, Keith Dallas as Bouncer
49	5	"Betty the Builder"	Ken Friss	Jennifer Siddle	April 11, 2016
Jarvis creates a new construction doll to appeal to girls when he learns that the head building constructioner next door is a woman named Betty, but Betty decides to cause chaos when she learns that the doll may have been designed after her. Meanwhile Piper takes over the shed to record a new song, but Candice tries to ruin any potential income for Piper by inputting her own vocals. Guest star: Morgan Brayton as Betty
50	6	"Joy Buzzer"	Milo Shandel	Nathaniel Moher	April 18, 2016
When Bowie's new Joy Buzzer toy comes down the coaster in a faulty box, the gang ends up spending the day cleaning them up. Rather than work on a new commercial Jarvis decides to help with the clean up, leading Piper to be in charge of the commercial. However Piper's end product is really creepy, and now Jarvis must find a good way to tell her it can't be used.
51	7	"Unicorpse"	Milo Shandel	Dan Signer & Howard Nemetz	April 25, 2016
Jarvis writes a hit song for Piper, but Piper fears the song is for Geneva and says it's too corny, causing Jarvis to claim Bowie wrote it instead. Meanwhile Knox tries to create a toy both Piper and Jarvis will like, but when he brings in what appears to be a real life unicorn Aster freaks out thinking Knox is about to kill the only creature of its kind. Guest star: Mackenzie Gray as Rock Star
52	8	"Microphony"	Jon Rosenbaum	Ryan W. Smith & Nathaniel Moher	May 2, 2016
A famous Hollywood actor comes to Knickknack to help promote an exclusive line of toys for her movie. Meanwhile Bowie decides to use a new Knickknack voice impersonation microphone to get Jarvis and Piper together, but everyone of his tricks only seems to make them madder at each other. Guest star: Jacqueline Breakwell as Tina Terelli
53	9	"My Last Dolly"	Raugi Yu	Dan Signer & Howard Nemetz	May 9, 2016
Jarvis and Knox create a focus group of senior citizens to come up with a new toy for seniors. They hire Candace to be part of the group, but when Candice sees how successful the toy will be she has Adelaide disguise herself as the new doll. Meanwhile Bowie and Piper refurbish old Knickknack toys for needy children, but when Aster's first sewing machine gets put in with the toys he'll do anything to get it back. Guest star: Paula Shaw as Edith, Chelsea Miller as Adelaide
54	10	"Ollie-Matic"	Heather Hawthorn-Doyle	Ryan W. Smith	May 16, 2016
When Jarvis learns that self driving cars are being tested around the area, he comes up with the idea to create a self driving skateboard. Upon the competition of the new skateboard Jarvis invites skate legend Eric Thunder to compete in a skateoff vs. Bowie. Meanwhile Piper and Geneva start the Knickknack Toy Talk podcast. Piper is extremely popular with the audio only crowd, but things turn south for her when Geneva sets up a video camera for people to watch it live. Guest star: Alex Rose as Eric Thunder
55	11	"Claude's Kitchen"	Ken Friss	Nadiya Chettiar	May 23, 2016
Jarvis and Bowie visit the cook set of Claude Brulee and invite him to Knickknack to create a miniature kitchen version of his set. When he arrives he falls in love with Piper and challenges Jarvis to a cookoff where the winner gets Piper. Meanwhile a baby bird falls from its nest and follows Aster around, so Geneva makes him raise it as though he were the mother bird. Guest star: Dave Dimapis as Dave, Gig Morton as Claude Brulee
56	12	"Captain Indestructible"	Siobhan Devine	Dan Signer & Howard Nemetz	May 30, 2016
Jarvis decides to spend his 3-year savings on a walk-on role in the new Captain Indestructible movie, but that changes when he learns Piper's favorite music place, The Viper Pit, is closing. He instead decides to spend the money on her to give her a chance to fulfill her dream. Meanwhile Knox performs some superhero actions that catch the movie worlds attention and may earn him the title role. Guest star: Benjamin Wilkinson as Barry Scorda, Raugi Yu as Mr. Jannetty
57	13	"Mmmboing"	Howard Nemetz	Dan Signer & Howard Nemetz	June 6, 2016
In the series finale life changes for the entire crew. Jarvis decides to start a talent agency for kids with Piper being his first signee, Knox accepts the movie role offered to him, Aster accepts a new job as a red carpet network host, Mmmboing leaves Knickknack to become a singer, and the crew reveals that they knew Candace has been Mrs. Bubkes before handing Knickknack back to her and making her part of their extended family. Guest star: Benjamin Wilkinson as Barry Scorda
