= Meredith Hambrock =

Canadian writer

Meredith Hambrock is a Canadian writer from Saskatoon, Saskatchewan.

Previously a television writer for Some Assembly Required and Corner Gas Animated, she published her debut novel Other People's Secrets in 2022, and served as writer-in-residence for the Saskatoon Public Library in 2023. In 2016, her short story "You Should Go Over There" was longlisted for the CBC Short Story Prize, and in 2026, her second novel, She's a Lamb!, won the Stephen Leacock Memorial Medal for Humour. Currently, she co-hosts The Novel Writer's Podcast with Brianna Labuskes.

Her episode "A Lot to Be Desired" from Corner Gas Animated was nominated for the Leo Award for Best Screenwriting in Animation in 2022.

== Publications ==
- Other People's Secrets (2022) Crooked Lane Books
- She's a Lamb! (2025) ECW Press

== Filmography ==
=== Some Assembly Required ===
- 1.05 – "Kick the Can"

=== Corner Gas Animated ===
- 2.01 – "Dream Waiver" (co-written with Brent Butt)
- 2.08 – "Bush League" (co-written with Brent Butt)
- 3.04 – "Sound and Fury"
- 3.05 – "Float Your Vote" (co-written with Andrew Carr)
- 3.06 – "Lock n' Loaf" (co-written with Brent Butt)
- 3.08 – "Band Aid" (co-written with Brent Butt)
- 4.02 – "Mother Father Figure"
- 4.05 – "A Lot to Be Desired"
- 4.10 – "Putt Putt Go"
