= List of Mr. Young episodes =

The following is a list of episodes for the Canadian television series Mr. Young, which airs on YTV in Canada and Disney XD internationally.

== Series overview ==
Season	Episodes	Originally released	
Season	Episodes	First released	Last released
1	26	March 1, 2011	December 13, 2011
2	26	January 12, 2012	October 9, 2012
3	28	October 16, 2012	November 28, 2013

== Episodes ==
=== Season 1 (2011) ===
No. overall	No. in season	Title	Directed by	Written by	Original release date	Prod. code
1	1	"Mr. Young"	Adam Weissman	Dan Signer	March 1, 2011	101
Adam Young (Brendan Meyer), a 14-year-old genius and university graduate, starts work as a high school science teacher. When the school bully, Jordan "Slab" Slabinski (Kurt Ostlund), steals Adam's master key and wreaks havoc throughout the school, Adam must get creative in order to resolve the conflict and outwit Slab. Guest stars: Brett Dier as Hutch, Amit Josan as Fortran and Debbie Cameron as Nanna. Recurring: Raugi Yu as Dang, Paula Shaw as Ms. Byrne, and Anna Galvin as Rachel Young
2	2	"Mr. Roboto"	Adam Weissman	Tim Long	March 8, 2011	103
Struggling to control his class, Adam creates a robot student, Arthur (Gordon Myren), Automated Robotic Teenager Hippopotamus Umbrella Rainbow (as he claimed he needed something for the "HUR"), to enforce the rules. When Mr. Tater (Milo Shandel) finds out, he figuratively says that he is going to kill Adam, which Arthur takes literally and tries to destroy Tater, as one of his directives is to protect Adam. Adam and Derby stop him by having the students dress up as Mr. Tater, causing Arthur's system to overload, though he reawakens later in a trash can. Guest stars: Brett Dier as Hutch and Gordon Myren as Arthur. Recurring: Raugi Yu as Dang and Anna Galvin as Rachel Young Note: This is the first time that Arthur is on the show. The title is a reference to Styx's song "Mr. Roboto".
3	3	"Mr. Detention"	Adam Weissman	Dan Signer	March 15, 2011	104
When Adam learns that his crush Echo (Matreya Fedor) takes the same route home from school, he plans to ask if he can walk home with her, but learns that he is on detention duty, and the only way to get out of it is to prevent anyone from getting in trouble. Adam and Derby spend the whole week trying to keep Slab from getting detention. Guest stars: Amit Josan as Fortran. Recurring:Paula Shaw as Ms. Byrne; Absent: Emily Tennant as Ivy Young. Note: The first episode to show Adam crossdressing. All the week Adam dresses as several characters from Star Wars: Chewbacca on Tuesday, Darth Vader on Wednesday, Yoda on Thursday and Princess Leia on Friday. Also Derby dresses as R2 D2 on Friday.
4	4	"Mr. Inventor"	Anthony Atkins	Howard Nemetz	March 22, 2011	106
Derby accidentally invents a miracle hair growth formula while goofing off in the science lab. When famous businessman Preston Pickles wants to market the formula, Derby has to recreate it, but cannot remember what the formula was. Meanwhile, Ivy needs to pass her CPR course. Guest star: Benjamin Wilkinson as Preston Pickles
5	5	"Mr. Younger Man"	Adam Weissman	Chuck Tatham	March 29, 2011	102
When Adam's friend from college, a gorgeous and brilliant 23-year-old woman named Sydney Finkelbaum, comes to visit, Derby convinces Adam that she is interested in him. However, Derby later finds out that she has a boyfriend and has to try to stop Adam from making a move on her. By the end of the episode, Sydney tells Adam that she is too old for him, but notices Adam's infatuation with Echo and flirts with him in front of her to make him seem charming and attractive. Meanwhile, Echo convinces Slab to stage a non-violent protest to prevent Tater from getting rid of the vending machines, while Slab gets her to bully people for him. Guest star: Emilie Ullerup as Sydney Finkelbaum
6	6	"Mr. DNA"	Mark Sawers	Howard Nemetz	April 5, 2011	105
Adam learns that cheerleading has been banned at Finnegan ever since his mother, who was a cheerleader in high school, put glue in Tater's mascot chicken head 25 years ago, rendering him stuck wearing it for a week. When Rachel denies responsibility for the crime, Adam decides to uncover the truth to get the ban lifted, eventually determining that it was Slab's mother who put the glue in the chicken head and framed Rachel for it. Absent: Emily Tennant as Ivy Young, as she is seen as one of the cheerleaders for the Finnegan Fryers and she is mentioned. Note: Kurt Ostlund also plays as his "mother" and "father".
7	7	"Mr. Honest"	Adam Weissman	Ken Cuperus	April 12, 2011	107
A botched volcano experiment in Adam's lab creates a gas that makes everyone tell the truth. When Tater finds out, he places Adam, Echo, Derby, Slab, and Ivy under quarantine. Afraid that the gas will make him tell Echo how he feels about her, Adam tries to prevent any form of communication between them. Meanwhile, Ivy tries to get out of quarantine to get to the mall, but Dang keeps stopping her.
8	8	"Mr. Ballerina"	Adam Weissman	Robin Stein	May 3, 2011	109
When Adam discovers that Slab is secretly taking ballet, he and Derby follow him to dance class, hoping to blackmail him into behaving at school. Guest star: Jovanna Huguet as Mme. Krampinova and Madison Dejarlais as Cute Girl
9	9	"Mr. Talent"	Adam Weissman	Ryan W. Smith & Jamie Davis	May 17, 2011	108
As no one is willing to sign up for the talent show, Tater offers a get-out-of-detention-free card to all talent show participants as an incentive. When nobody earns detention, he improvises new rules as excuses to give students detention, including a "no texting" rule, which Ivy finds several ways to circumvent so she can avoid the talent show. Meanwhile, Echo voluntarily signs up for the school talent show as a singer, encouraged by Adam. When he learns that she is not a talented singer, he tries to find a way to sabotage her performance and save her from embarrassment without hurting her feelings. Guest star: Eric Pollins as Sergio
10	10	"Mr. Big Brother"	Anthony Atkins	Ken Cuperus	June 14, 2011	110
After Adam finds out that Echo is taking her "little sister" to the school carnival, Adam signs up to be a "big brother" so they can spend the day together. When Derby mistakenly enters Adam's age on the questionnaire as 41 instead of 14, Adam ends up with a "little brother" who is older than him and whom shares a mutual attraction with Echo. Guest stars: Olivia Steele-Falconer as Chloe and Alistair Weir as Desmond
11	11	"Mr. Shakespeare"	Adam Weissman	Jennica Harper	July 12, 2011	111
Adam is made faculty advisor for the school play, "Romeo & Juliet", but when Tater casts Echo as Juliet, Adam tries to prevent her from kissing Romeo. Guest stars: Brett Dier as Hutch and Amit Josan as Fortran
12	12	"Mr. Meteor"	Anthony Atkins	Ken Cuperus	August 9, 2011	112
Adam holds an overnight astronomy class in the quad, but finds himself competing for his students' attention with Tater, who treats it like a camping trip. Adam tries to trick the class into camping with him. Meanwhile, Ivy plays a horsing game with Dang. Note: Slab returns from a 2 episode absence. This is also the first appearance of Slab in an episode directed by Anthony Atkins.
13	13	"Mr. Impossible"	Jon Rosenbaum	Howard Nemetz	August 30, 2011	113
Wanting to be paired with Echo in a computer match-making fundraiser, Adam goes to any lengths necessary to ensure his questionnaire answers match hers.
14	14	"Mr. Marvelous"	Adam Weissman	Jennica Harper	September 6, 2011	114
When Adam's mom sells his prized "Mr. Marvelous" comic book to Slab, Adam dresses up as Mr. Marvelous himself in an attempt to get it back. Guest stars: Connor Levins as Jimmy and Peter New as Dog Catcher
15	15	"Mr. Dog"	Adam Weissman	Dan Signer	September 13, 2011	115
Adam believes that a professor has been nominated for a Nobel Prize based on research stolen from Adam. When he and Derby break into the professor's office to search for proof, they discover he is blind, so Adam convinces Derby to pretend to be his seeing eye dog. Guest stars: Graeme Duffy as Professor Gallifrey
16	16	"Mr. School Song"	Adam Weissman	Ryan W. Smith	September 20, 2011	117
With Adam, Dang, Mr. Tater, and Mrs. Bryne as the judges, the students try to write a school song for Finnegan High. When all the individual songs turn out to be bad, they all work together. Guest stars: Jeremy Dangerfield as Bruce Willis, Mr. Tater's mentor
17	17	"Mr. Picture Day"	Anthony Atkins	Howard Nemetz	October 4, 2011	116
Echo shows Adam what he missed when he graduated high school at age 9. Meanwhile, Ivy tries to keep herself clean for picture day, and Slab becomes interested in photosynthesis and wants to produce his own food just like plants. Guest stars: Aren Buchholz as Toby
18	18	"Mr. Tickleschmootz"	Adam Weissman	Jennifer Daley	October 18, 2011	118
Adam offers to watch Echo's hamster while she's away, but it dies under his care. Adam panics and tries to clone the creature, with disastrous results. In the end, he realizes that the hamster is actually hibernating.
19	19	"Mr. Mummy"	Adam Weissman	Ken Cuperus	October 25, 2011	120
On Halloween night, Echo invites Adam to go to a horror movie screening at the school. In order to attend, a grounded Adam must hide from his mom when she shows up at school. Absent: Kurt Ostlund as Jordan Slabinski; Guest stars: Brett Dier as Hutch Note: The Sand and Soil Chronicles is based on the series of novels The Twilight Saga.
20	20	"Mr. Elderman"	Adam Weissman	Jennica Harper	November 1, 2011	119
Adam tries to get his students to appreciate having a young teacher by pretending to be his own substitute, an ornery elderly man. When the students appreciate his substitute more than they do Adam, Tater fires Adam. Absent: Emily Tennant as Ivy Young Guest stars: Dakota Hutchins as Child Tater
21	21	"Mr. Servant"	Adam Weissman	Dan Signer	November 8, 2011	121
Finnegan High School staff members are auctioned off as servants for a fund-raiser. Adam sees it as an opportunity to spend a day with Echo, but she bids on Mrs. Byrne instead, and Ivy bids on him. Slab bids on Tater for $50,000, and Derby bids on Dang to teach him how to fight. Guest stars: Brett Dier as Hutch and Chelsea Powrie as Bethany
22	22	"Mr. Masterpiece"	Jon Rosenbaum	Ken Cuperus & Ryan W. Smith	November 15, 2011	122
The kids learn that a world-famous artist once taught at Finnegan High and embark on a hunt for his hidden artwork in hopes of selling it for a profit.
23	23	"Mr. Brain"	Adam Weissman	Howard Nemetz	November 22, 2011	123
Adam gets a new student, 10-year-old genius Joseph. Adam is initially thrilled to have a younger version of himself to mentor, but he lets jealousy get the best of him when he feels upstaged by Joseph. Guest stars: Darien Provost as Joseph and John Barnett as Sound Effects Guy
24–25	24–25	"Mr. Space"	Jon Rosenbaum	Dan Signer & Howard Nemetz	November 29, 2011	125–126
After being pranked by his students, a fed-up Adam quits Finnegan High School and takes a job at the NASA Space Program. While trying to impress his friends with his new job, Adam accidentally launches them all into outer space. Guest stars: Carmen Lavigne as Kale, Gary Peterman as Lord Snoutford, Colin Naples as Ringleader and Jason McKinnon as Bradbury.
26	26	"Mr. Moth"	Anthony Atkins	Jennifer Daley & Jennica Harper	December 13, 2011	124
When Adam is accidentally doused with moth pheromones, he suddenly becomes the object of Echo's attention, but fears he may be turning into a moth. This is later revealed to be Echo's dream; she awakens confused as to why she dreamt about being attracted to Adam, but appears to be developing real feelings for him.

=== Season 2 (2012) ===
No. overall	No. in season	Title	Directed by	Written by	Original release date	Prod. code
27	1	"Mr. Claus"	Jon Rosenbaum	Dan Signer & Howard Nemetz	March 12, 2012	204
Derby has a dream about accidentally knocking Santa out of his sleigh on Christmas Eve, causing Santa to develop amnesia. Adam, Derby, Echo, Ivy and Slab must deliver presents to the world instead. When they return, they discover that Santa only pretended to lose his memory, wanting to get out of delivering presents for the night.
28–29	2–3	"Mr. Spring Break (Canada)" "Mr. Summer Vacation (United States)"	Jason Furukawa	Dan Signer & Howard Nemetz	March 19, 2012	225–226
Adam follows Echo to the exotic country of Sanduras in the hopes of spending time with her, but keeps getting pulled away by his guardian, Mrs. Byrne. Meanwhile, Derby and Slab travel to Sanduras by hot air balloon, and Tater and Dang search for a legendary beast: the Sasquawk. Guest stars: Giles Panton as Alejandro, Ryan Beil as Balloon Operator, Keith Blackman Dallas as Balloon Cop, Chad Bellamy as Snake, Ryan Ochoa as Diego and Victoria Duffield (as herself)
30	4	"Mr. Matchmaker"	Jon Rosenbaum	Ryan W. Smith	March 26, 2012	203
Adam and Echo decide to find Tater a woman in the hopes that it will make him more easygoing. Echo convinces Adam to match Tater up with Adam's mom, Rachel, much to Adam's chagrin. Meanwhile, Derby tries to cure Slab's phobia of milk.
31	5	"Mr. Sleep"	Jon Rosenbaum	Dan Signer & Howard Nemetz	April 2, 2012	201
Hoping to teach his students the importance of getting a good night's rest, Adam conducts a sleep deprivation experiment at Finnegan and challenges the students to stay awake for the entire night while hanging out in his class. As the night wears on, the group is affected by the various effects of sleep deprivation.
32	6	"Mr. TV"	Jon Rosenbaum	Jennica Harper	April 9, 2012	202
The producer of the popular science-based TV show, "Science Schmience", arrives at Finnegan, looking to hire Adam as the show's new host. Adam agrees, seeing this as a great opportunity to spread his love of science to a broader audience. When the producer grows bored of Adam's academic jargon, he hires Derby as the host of the show instead. Guest stars: Laurie Murdoch as Professor Les
33	7	"Mr. Pickles"	Adam Weissman	Nathaniel Moher	April 16, 2012	206
Having had his career ruined by Derby, Preston Pickles takes a job as Finnegan High's new shop teacher. Convinced that Preston is trying to get rid of him, Derby must find a way to reignite Preston's career as an infomercial pitchman. Guest stars: Benjamin Wilkinson as Preston Pickles
34	8	"Mr. Student"	Adam Weissman	Dan Signer & Howard Nemetz	April 23, 2012	213
Adam pretends to be a student at Finnegan High so that he can join the Quiz Team and help Echo win a trophy. When Slab takes Echo's spot on the team, Adam tries to force him off so Echo can take his place. Guest stars: Brett Dier as Hutch, Nicholas Ekren as Ken and Taylor Hui as Molly
35	9	"Mr. Movie"	Adam Weissman	Jennica Harper	April 30, 2012	210
Finnegan holds its first annual Film Festival, with each student submitting a film encapsulating a wide range of genres.
36	10	"Mr. Elephant"	Anthony Atkins	Jennica Harper	May 7, 2012	211 N/A
A teenage girl named Brap who was raised by elephants is accidentally transported from her home in the rainforest to Adam's classroom. Impressed by her animalistic nature, Slab falls in love at first sight, but Brap is interested in Adam. While Echo and Adam try to help Brap fit in at Finnegan, Slab tries to win her affections. Ivy trains Brap to act like her and renames her Briannna (with 3 N's). Guest stars: Megan Thompson as Brap and Colin Naples as Ringleader
37	11	"Mr. Candidate"	Adam Weissman	Dan Signer & Howard Nemetz	May 14, 2012	207
In the hopes of getting Derby to stop acting up, Adam and Tater suggest he run for Student Council President. However, when Derby campaigns for superintendent, Adam and Tater must stop him from winning or risk losing their jobs. Meanwhile, Echo helps Slab celebrate his cousin's birthday.
38	12	"Mr. Roboto 2.0"	Adam Weissman	Dan Signer & Howard Nemetz	May 28, 2012	209
ARTHUR returns after recycling himself and reprogramming himself to make android copies of all humans. Meanwhile, Echo writes a report about the dangers of robotics, but chaos ensues when her robot counterpart holds a presentation about the wonders of robotics. 'Guest stars: Gordon Myren as Arthur/Bronzon
39	13	"Mr. Rock Star"	Keith Samples	Dan Signer & Howard Nemetz	June 4, 2012	214
When Adam learns that Echo is a fan of Dark Demon, a heavy metal musician Adam knew in college, he tries to get his old friend to visit Finnegan High. When Dark Demon refuses to make an appearance, Adam pretends to be him and agrees to perform at Echo's Save the Ferrets benefit. Guest stars: Nicholas Ouelette as Dark Demon, Ajay Parikh-Friese as Rupinder, Beverly Ndukwu as Esl Student No. 1, Joshua Pak as Esl Student No. 2 and Paulina Krulikowski as Esl Student No. 3
40	14	"Mr. Witness"	Adam Weissman	Dan Signer & Howard Nemetz	July 9, 2012	208
After Slab threatens Derby for tattling on him to Tater, Derby asks Tater for protection. Tater convinces Slab that Derby has moved away while Derby pretends to be a British exchange student named Simon.
41	15	"Mr. College"	Adam Weissman	Dan Signer	July 23, 2012	215
After Adam secretly tweaks Echo's science fair project, she wins first prize, is instantly graduated from Finnegan, and is granted a full scholarship to Great Northern University. Adam, with the help of Derby and Slab, must crash a frat party and convince Echo to come back to Finnegan. Guest stars:Brent McLare as Natty
42	16	"Mr. Discovery"	Jon Rosenbaum	Dan Signer & Howard Nemetz	July 16, 2012	205
When Adam can't get his class to stop talking, he assigns them oral presentations on the world's greatest discoveries. Through a series of flashbacks, the students reenact the events that led to the discovery of polonium, the lightbulb, fire, and more.
43	17	"Mr. Pixel"	Jason Furukawa	Cameron Labine	July 30, 2012	212
Derby becomes addicted to the computer game "Pixel City," where he acts as his virtual alter-ego, Antoine Bolognese. Set on convincing Derby to rejoin the real world, Adam enters the game to track him down, but finds out Derby has digitally recreated the entire Finnegan gang to serve and protect him.
44	18	"Mr. Dance"	Jon Rosenbaum	Jennica Harper	August 13, 2012	217
Determined to catch the notorious prankster "Gagmeister General" red-handed, Tater recruits Adam for a stakeout, tampering with Adam's plans to take Echo to a school dance. Meanwhile, Ivy tries to get sympathy votes for Queen of the Dance by taking Derby as her date. 'Animal' Canada goose
45	19	"Mr. Cyclops"	Jon Rosenbaum	Dan Signer	August 20, 2012	216
When Derby doesn't get a free toy with his cereal, he and Adam go to Cyclops Foods to speak with the head of the company, an actual one-eyed cyclops. Meanwhile, Slab joins the knitting club and becomes obsessed with it, but this leads to trouble when the nerds start messing around in school.
46	20	"Mr. Switch"	Adam Weissman	Ryan W. Smith	August 27, 2012	218
When Adam's neural-imaging unit accidentally switches the gang's personalities, they must work together to fix the machine and return to their original bodies before Tater finds out.
47	21	"Mr. Scooter"	Adam Weissman	Dan Signer	September 3, 2012	219
When Adam, Echo, Derby, Ivy, and Slab find themselves waiting outside Tater's office together, they realize they're all in trouble for the same crime – destroying Tater's scooter.
48	22	"Mr. Airplane"	Adam Weissman	Howard Nemetz	September 10, 2012	220
When Adam coaches the Engineering Squad in a paper airplane competition, he finds out that Slab is a master at it and recruits him. Meanwhile, Ivy tries to make herself unattractive to win the nerds' attention.
49	23	"Mr. Poet"	Anthony Atkins	Jennica Harper	September 17, 2012	221
When a dreamy new English teacher shows up at Finnegan High and impresses Echo with his poetry, Adam becomes jealous and tries to make it so that he never sees her.
50	24	"Mr. Alligator"	Adam Weissman	Cameron Labine	September 25, 2012	223
Echo gets "nurse" on her aptitude test, but disbelieves it. Adam goes to great lengths to try to convince her that it would be the perfect profession for her.
51	25	"Mr. 1812"	Adam Weissman	Jennica Harper, Ryan W. Smith, Cameron Labine, and Nathaniel Moher	October 2, 2012	224
During a power outage at school, the students accept a dare from Tater and try to live without technology.
52	26	"Mr. Invisible"	Anthony Atkins	Nathaniel Moher	October 9, 2012	222
Adam invents an invisibility suit and uses it to spy on Echo while she tries to impress a boy she has to work on a project with.

=== Season 3 (2012–13) ===
No. overall	No. in season	Title	Directed by	Written by	Original release date
53	1	"Mr. Candy"	David Winning	Jennica Harper	October 16, 2012
The morning after Halloween, the gang tries to remember what they did during their candy-fueled haze the night before.
54	2	"Mr. & Mrs. Roboto"	Jon Rosenbaum	Howard Nemetz & Dan Signer	November 6, 2012
ARTHUR returns to Finnegan with his new robot family, and Adam is asked to babysit ARTHUR's children. Adam agrees and tries to impress Echo with his parenting skills, but soon realizes that dealing with kids is not as easy as it looks. Meanwhile, Derby and Ivy decide to dress up as robots so they can make friends with ARTHUR.
55	3	"Mr. Magic"	Adam Weissman	Ken Cuperus	November 13, 2012
The class goes to a Magic Mansion. Adam tries to get rid of everyone with a "magic box" so he and Echo can be alone, and after a string of odd events, ends up trying to saw Echo in half. Meanwhile, Tater tries to get a new membership card.
56	4	"Mr. Apartment"	Howard Nemetz	Jennica Harper	November 20, 2012
Adam buys his own apartment, hoping for some peace and quiet, but people persistently visit him for help with their problems. With the help of his mom, they try to get out of the lease. Meanwhile, Tater enlists Dang's help in fooling his new girlfriend Gwen to believing he's a billionaire living in a mansion. When she leaves him after learning the truth, Adam ends up selling Tater his apartment.
57	5	"Mr. Hyde"	Anthony Atkins	Dan Signer & Howard Nemetz	November 27, 2012
Adam makes a potion to give himself the confidence to ask Echo out, but it causes him to turn into a monster each time he thinks about her. He tries to avoid her, but she ends up accidentally consuming the potion as well.
58	6	"Mr. Elf"	Adam Weissman	Ryan W. Smith & Nathaniel Moher	December 12, 2012
Adam brings a reindeer to the North Pole and convinces Santa Claus to automate the work. Adam then has to care for the now unemployed elves.
59	7	"Mr. Time"	Keith Samples	Dan Signer & Howard Nemetz	January 8, 2013
When Adam makes a mistake with a time machine and causes class to go by extremely fast, Echo and Slab must try to stop Mr. Tater from entering the class.
60	8	"Mr. Pickles-In-Law"	Keith Samples	Ryan W. Smith & Nathaniel Moher	January 15, 2013
Derby dates a girl whom he learns is related to Preston Pickles.
61	9	"Mr. Sci-Fi"	David Winning	Ken Cuperus	January 22, 2013
Adam is hired as a science advisor for a sci-fi movie being shot in Finnegan.
62	10	"Mr. Tutor"	Jason Furukawa	Jennica Harper	January 29, 2013
Adam tutors Ivy in exchange for sold-out tickets to a music festival.
63	11	"Mr. Club"	Jason Furukawa	Ken Cuperus	February 5, 2013
Adam tries to get into Echo's secret club so they can have something in common.
64	12	"Mr. Heart"	Jason Furukawa	Dan Signer & Howard Nemetz	February 14, 2013
Adam and Derby use a shrink ray to enter Echo's body to cure her cold so that Adam can go on a date with her.
65	13	"Mr. Sasquawk"	Adam Weissman	Ryan W. Smith & Nathaniel Moher	February 19, 2013
Adam frees Sasquawk, who becomes jealous of Adam's relationship with Echo.
66	14	"Mr. Slumber Party"	David Winning	Ken Cuperus	February 26, 2013
Ivy brings the cheerleaders over for a slumber party. Fearing Echo may see Adam's shrine for her, he sets up his own slumber party in the basement to distract her.
67	15	"Mr. Double Date"	Siobhan Devine	Ryan W. Smith & Nathaniel Moher	February 26, 2013
Echo and Adam set each other up with a date to go on a double date, but Echo finds out that Adam might be the right guy for her.
68	16	"Mr. Love Letter"	Jason Furukawa	Cole Bastedo	March 5, 2013
Adam is scared his love letter will be shown to Echo until his signature is cut, but another student, Jared, claims he wrote it, he soon has to find a way to prove that Jared didn't write it, also to make sure no one knows it was him. Guest star: Samuel Patrick Chu as Jared
69	17	"Mr. Freshman"	Siobhan Devine	Jennica Harper	March 5, 2013
When Adam is a tour guide for a college Ivy wants to go to, he gets caught up meeting his old science professor, who tells a story about Adam.
70–72	18–20	"Mr. First Impression"	Jon Rosenbaum	Dan Signer & Howard Nemetz	March 12, 2013
Adam confesses his feelings to Echo, but she storms off in disgust. Adam uses a time machine to travel back to the first day they met to make a better first impression on her. This plan backfires, and the time travel mishaps multiply and spiral out of control until Adam's meddling in the past has him scrambling to keep from being permanently stuck there. Eventually, he accepts that he and Echo are not meant to be, and returns to the present. Echo arrives and kisses him, explaining that the only reason she fled earlier was because she was embarrassed by her hair and outfit and wanted to look good for the moment they cemented their relationship. Adam kisses her back and makes her promise not to tell anyone that they're dating, worried he may get fired if word gets out that he is dating a student.
73	21	"Mr. Memory"	Siobhan Devine	Jennica Harper	March 19, 2013
When Derby almost gives away the secret that Adam and Echo are dating, Adam creates a memory erasing device to make Derby forget about their relationship, but the machine is accidentally used on Echo, who subsequently forgets that she and Adam are dating. Tater finds out anyway and notifies the school board, who choose not to fire Adam, but have Echo (and the other students) transferred into the class of a new kid teacher, Mr. Kidd. Meanwhile, Ivy realizes that Slab is the only boy in school whose romantic advances she has not yet rejected, and tries to get him to ask her out so she can complete her list. However, when Slab finally does ask her out, she says yes.
74	22	"Mr. Kidd"	Steve Wright	Ken Cuperus	March 26, 2013
Mr. Kidd manages to win over his students effortlessly, much to Adam's chagrin. Developing an interest in Echo himself, Mr. Kidd uses a reverse memory eraser on her, causing her to believe that she and Mr. Kidd are dating. Mr. Kidd then uses the memory eraser on the entire student body to make them forget Adam ever existed. Adam restores Echo's memory with a kiss, subsequently restoring everyone else's memory and leading to Mr. Kidd getting fired. Meanwhile, Ivy and Slab have to complete a book report on George Orwell's Nineteen Eighty-Four, despite neither of them having read the book.
75	23	"Mr. Court"	Steve Wright	Ken Cuperus	April 2, 2013
When Mrs. Straupperson is thought to be dead, Ivy is the prime suspect and she is tested in student court.
76	24	"Mr. Budget"	Howard Nemetz	Dan Signer & Howard Nemetz	November 7, 2013
After Adam and Tater struggle to find budget cuts at Finnegan High, Cyclops Foods buys the school and turns it into a product-testing facility. But when a faulty product transforms the students into actual cyclopses, Adam must find a way to reverse the effects and save Finnegan.
77	25	"Mr. Interview"	Howard Nemetz	Dan Signer & Howard Nemetz	November 14, 2013
A TV news program comes to interview Adam about being the world's youngest high school teacher. To ensure the interview goes smoothly, Tater has dumped Echo, Derby, and Slab in a fake version of Finnegan High.
78	26	"Mr. Spin-Off"	Howard Nemetz	Cole Bastedo & Nathaniel Moher & Jennifer Siddle & Ryan W. Smith	November 21, 2013
A Hollywood writer comes to Finnegan with the intention of making a TV show about Adam. But he is distracted by Echo, Derby, and Ivy, who all think they have better ideas for TV shows, starring themselves.
79–80	27–28	"Mr. Finale"	Jon Rosenbaum	Dan Signer & Howard Nemetz	November 28, 2013
When Dang is called back to Vietnam to take over for Master Ki as guardian of his village, the gang follows him to try and convince him to come back to Finnegan for graduation. Adam discovers an ancient scroll that points to a mythical fountain of youth that could make Master Ki young again, releasing Dang from his duties. While Adam and Derby search for it, Tater helps Echo learn about monkey behavior, and Ivy helps Slab prepare for his first ever cover model photo shoot. Ultimately, the group returns to Finnegan just in time for graduation. Now having taught at Finnegan for four years, Adam resigns and takes up a new job as a college science professor. To Adam's surprise, much of his old class are his new students, though they have now gained respect for him. Special guest star: Nathan Kress as Pete, Vincent Tong as Master Ki
