= Some Assembly Required (2014 TV series) =

2014 teen comedy TV series

- Genre: Teen sitcom
- Created by: Dan Signer; Howard Nemetz
- Starring: Kolton Stewart; Charlie Storwick; Harrison Houde; Sydney Scotia; Travis Turner; Dylan Playfair; Ellie Harvie
- Theme music composer: Matthew Tishler and Andrew Ang
- Opening theme: "Here We Go" performed by Kolton Stewart
- Ending theme: "Here We Go" (instrumental)
- Composer: James Jandrisch
- Country of origin: Canada
- Original language: English
- No. of seasons: 3
- No. of episodes: 58 (list of episodes)

Production
- Executive producers: Dan Signer; Howard Nemetz; Michael Shepard; Tim Gamble
- Producer: Alexandra Raffe
- Production locations: Burnaby, British Columbia (taping location)
- Editor: Daria Ellerman
- Camera setup: Videotape; Multi-camera
- Running time: 22–23 minutes (approximately)
- Production companies: Thunderbird Films; Gravy Boat Productions; Remotely Funny Productions

Original release
- Network: YTV
- Release: January 6, 2014 – June 6, 2016

Some Assembly Required is a Canadian teen situation comedy series that aired on YTV in Canada and streams on Netflix (season 1 & season 2) and YouTube (season 3) worldwide. Produced in Burnaby, British Columbia, it was created by Dan Signer (The Suite Life on Deck, A.N.T. Farm, Mr. Young) & Howard Nemetz, and stars Kolton Stewart, Charlie Storwick, Harrison Houde, Sydney Scotia, Dylan Playfair, Travis Turner and Ellie Harvie. The first season, with 26 episodes, began airing in January 2014; the series finale aired on June 6, 2016. The first season was first streamed on Netflix in 2015, followed by the second season. The third season is currently streaming on Amazon Prime Video, included with a basic Prime subscription.

== Premise ==
Jarvis Raines (Kolton Stewart) is an average 14-year-old who becomes the CEO of company Knickknack Toys overnight after he sues them over a defective chemistry set that blows up his house. He recruits a diverse group of kids from his high school to help him run the company and invent new products. Something usually backfires when they are trying to develop a new toy. The former CEO of Knicknack, Candace Wheeler, disguises herself as Mrs Bubkes, an unassuming cleaning lady, to attempt to sabotage the team. Before the end credits, there are usually advertisements showing Knickknack Toys' newest products, which are shown or often invented in said episode, as well as the company's mascot, P. Everett Knickknack, telling the viewer that "The 'P' stands for (word that begins with 'P')".

== Episodes ==
Season	Episodes	Originally released	
Season	Episodes	First released	Last released
1	26	January 6, 2014	August 26, 2014
2	18	January 5, 2015	February 1, 2016
3	13	March 14, 2016	June 6, 2016

== Cast and characters ==
=== Main ===
- Kolton Stewart as Jarvis Raines, a fun-loving teenager who becomes the CEO of Knickknack Toys after suing the company when a defective chemistry set he got for Christmas blows up his house. Over time, he develops feelings for Piper, whom he begins dating in season 3.
- Charlie Storwick as Piper Gray, a tech-savvy, sardonic goth who is hired by Jarvis as the Chief Technology Officer and is later promoted to vice president of the company. She has harbored romantic feelings for Jarvis since prior to being hired by him, which he eventually starts to reciprocate.
- Harrison Houde as Bowie Sherman, Jarvis' eccentric best friend who is hired in an unknown position before being placed in charge of the Joke and Prank Division. He is quite incompetent, often making reckless decisions that endanger the company.
- Sydney Scotia as Geneva Hayes, a beautiful but dimwitted girl who "works" as the receptionist and Jarvis's personal executive assistant. Many of the boys at school are attracted to her, including Jarvis until he begins dating Piper. Despite her apparent lack of intelligence, she has a few hidden talents, such as being able to solve a Rubik's Cube faster than a robot.
- Travis Turner as Aster Vanderberg, a creative, confident, and fashion-forward student who becomes the chief design officer of Knickknack Toys. He thinks very highly of himself and enjoys insulting others based on what they are wearing.
- Dylan Playfair as Malcolm "Knox" Knoxford III, an amateur extreme sports daredevil who is friendly and outgoing, but lacks intelligence. He is recruited as the product safety tester and human crash test dummy.
- Ellie Harvie as Candace Wheeler / Mrs. Bubkes, the previous owner of Knickknack and the only adult in the main cast. She refused to give Jarvis a settlement after selling him a defective chemistry set that blew up his house, leading the jury to award the company to Jarvis as compensation. Candace masquerades as Knickknack's janitor Mrs. Bubkes, an elderly woman from the fictional Eastern European country Meeskatania, to spy on and sabotage Jarvis and his friends in hopes of regaining control of the company. In the series finale, it is revealed that the cast had been aware of Mrs. Bubkes' true identity from the beginning, and had merely been pretending to go along with it for their own amusement.

=== Recurring ===
- Russell Roberts as P. Everett Knickknack (Season 1 for human version), the original owner of Knickknack Toys since 1943 who pops out of nowhere one day. Everyone thinks he is a fraud trying to steal the company, especially Bowie, who thinks he is Candace. Even though he was proven innocent, it is unknown whether or not he is an impostor. Throughout the show, he and his cartoon counterpart use a running gag to say words and sentences that start with the letter 'P' because the 'P' in "P. Everett Knickknack" is unknown.
- Mmmboing is a rubber bouncing ball that was created by Bowie in the pilot and has not stopped bouncing since. Mmmboing has become a running gag in the series appearing somewhere in almost every episode.
- Nils Hognestad as Mr. Gournisht (Season 1–2), a recurring character that appears in "Lobster Trap", "Flycycle", and "Rocket with a Pocket". He is a Meesketanian-born man who is fluent in both Meesketanian and English. Mr. Gournisht is deeply in love with Mrs. Bubkes (Candace's alter-ego) but has no interest in Candace Wheeler. He works as an astronaut, working on the "Meeska-foot".
- Chelsea Miller as Adelaide (Season 2-3), a girl from an orphanage that Candace used to fake a home video of her alter-ego Mrs. Bubkes as a child and later decided to adopt because they have a lot in common. The adoption agency did not allow Candace to adopt Adelaide due to her bad reputation, so she disguises herself as Mrs. Bubkes to officially adopt her.

== Production ==
The series was created and executive produced by Dan Signer and Howard Nemetz and produced in Burnaby, British Columbia. The series was renewed for a second season in June 2014. On August 19, 2015, the series was renewed for a third season. On January 7, 2017, YTV canceled the series and aired the final 13-episode third season on their network.
