= Matreya Fedor =

Canadian actress

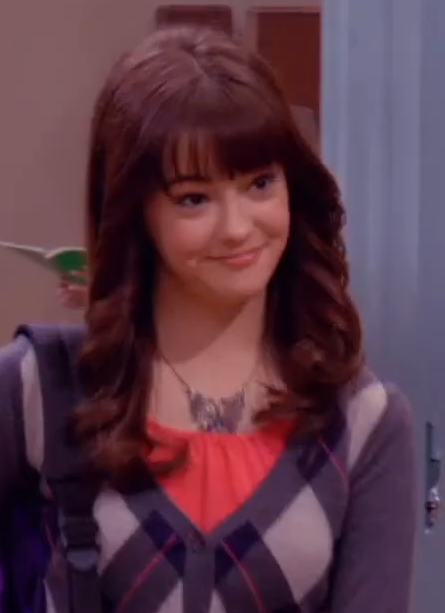
- Fedor as Echo Zizzleswift in Mr. Young
- Born: Matreya Natasha Fedor; March 11, 1997 (age 29); Vancouver, British Columbia, Canada
- Occupation: Actress
- Years active: 2006–2017

Matreya Natasha Fedor (born March 11, 1997) is a Canadian actress. She is notable for her roles in Slither (2006), Supernatural (2007), Chaos Theory (2008), The Break-Up Artist (2009), The Troop (2009–2010), Mr. Young (2011–2013), Cedar Cove (2013–2014), Perfect High (2015), and television movies My One Christmas Wish (2015), and Home For Christmas Day (2017).

== Life and career ==
Fedor was born on March 11, 1997, in Vancouver, British Columbia, Canada.

In 2006, Fedor's career started aged 9, in the comedy horror film Slither. In 2007, she further boosted her credentials landing a guest role as Tyler Thompson in two episodes of Supernatural, alongside Jensen Ackles and Jared Padalecki.

She had a recurring role in the Nickelodeon series The Troop, and co-starred in the sitcom Mr. Young along with Brendan Meyer. She appeared in a music video for the song Never Too Late by Three Days Grace. She also appeared in a commercial for Carnival Cruise Lines. Fedor was cast as Ava in the 2015 Up TV movie My One Christmas Wish alongside Glee actress Amber Riley.

In 2017, Fedor starred as Betsy McKendrick in the Hallmark movie Home For Christmas Day.

Fedor paused her acting endeavours while attending the University of Victoria, where she majored in economics. Since then, she has worked as an associate for a private equity company.

== Filmography ==
Film roles
Year	Title	Role	Notes
2006	Slither	Emily Strutemyer	
2006	In Her Mother's Footsteps	Emma Nolan	
2006	Trapped Ashes	Young Nathalie	
2007	Mrs. Wetherby's Treasure	Jodi	Video short
2008	Chaos Theory	Jesse Allen (7 years old)	
2009	The Break-Up Artist	Britney (10 years old)	
2015	The Birdwatcher	Lucy Wilson	

Television roles
Year	Title	Role	Notes
2007	Supernatural	Tyler Thompson / Taylor	Episodes: "Playthings", "Tall Tales"
2007	Eureka	Tina	Episode: "Duck Duck Goose"
2007	Sunshine Girl	Sunshine Girl	Television film
2007	Love Notes	Willa	Television film
2009	Memory Lanes	Emma Morris	Television film
2009–2010	The Troop	Phoebe Collins	Recurring role; 6 episodes
2011–2013	Mr. Young	Echo Zizzleswift	Main role; 80 episodes
2012	Splatalot!	Herself	Episode "Celebrity Splatdown"
2013–2014	Cedar Cove	Allison Weston	Recurring role; 6 episodes
2014	My Mother's Future Husband	Headly	Television film
2015	Perfect High	Brooke	Television film
2015	My One Christmas Wish	Ava	Television film
2016	Electra Woman and Dyna Girl	Bernice	Web series
2017	Home For Christmas Day	Betsy McKendrick	Television film
