= Dan Signer =

Canadian-American television producer and writer

- Born: Daniel Signer; Toronto, Ontario, Canada
- Occupations: Television producer, television writer
- Years active: 1999–present
- Known for: A.N.T. Farm, Mr. Young, Some Assembly Required

Daniel Signer is a Canadian-American television producer and writer. He is creator and executive producer of Some Assembly Required for Netflix and YTV, A.N.T. Farm for Disney Channel and Mr. Young for YTV and Disney XD. He previously served as a writer and Executive Producer on One Day at a Time for Netflix and Go Away, Unicorn! for YTV and Disney Channel.

Prior to creating those series, he worked on series Rude Awakening, Grown Ups, Greg the Bunny, Baby Bob, All of Us, Stacked, Quintuplets, True Jackson, VP, The Suite Life of Zack & Cody and The Suite Life on Deck.
