= Mr. Young =

- Created by: Dan Signer
- Starring: Brendan Meyer; Matreya Fedor; Gig Morton; Kurt Ostlund; Emily Tennant; Milo Shandel; Anna Galvin; Raugi Yu; Paula Shaw
- Theme music composer: Steve Bays; Paul Hawley; Luke Paquin
- Opening theme: "Who You Calling Kid" performed by Hot Hot Heat
- Composer: James Jandrisch
- Country of origin: Canada
- Original language: English
- No. of seasons: 3
- No. of episodes: 80 (list of episodes)

Production
- Executive producers: Dan Signer; Howard Nemetz (season 2–3); Michael Shepard; Tim Gamble
- Producers: Victoria Hirst; Alexandra Raffe; Lisa Richardson
- Production locations: 5828 Byrne Road; Burnaby, British Columbia (taping location)
- Editors: Daria Ellerman; Warren Hickman; Kirk Hay
- Camera setup: Videotape; Multi-camera
- Running time: 22 minutes 26 seconds (approximately)
- Production companies: Thunderbird Films; Gravy Boat Productions

Original release
- Network: YTV
- Release: March 1, 2011 – November 28, 2013

Mr. Young is a Canadian sitcom that premiered on March 1, 2011, on YTV. The series was filmed in Burnaby, British Columbia. The series was created by Dan Signer (who also worked on Disney Channel series such as The Suite Life on Deck and A.N.T. Farm), and stars Brendan Meyer, Matreya Fedor, and Gig Morton as attendees of Finnegan High School. Further main cast includes Kurt Ostlund, Milo Shandel, and Emily Tennant. Set between 2010 and 2014, the show follows the lives of the students and faculty of Finnegan High over a four-year period, during which the characters deal with such topics as romantic relationships, friendships, acceptance, self-worth and the importance of community. The first half of Season 1 is set during the main characters’ Grade 9 year, while the remainder of Season 1 until the end of Season 2 is set during their Grade 10 year. The remainder of the series spans their Grade 11 year, with the final two episodes being set in June 2014, shortly before the students graduate Grade 12. The show ended its run on November 28, 2013, with three seasons and 80 episodes.

== Premise ==
Mr. Young centers on Adam Young (Brendan Meyer), a child prodigy who graduated from university at the age of 14. He decides to come back to high school as a science teacher to live the high school "experience". He reunites with his childhood best friend Derby von Derbotsford (Gig Morton) and encounters the school bully Jordan "Slab" Slabinski (Kurt Ostlund), and develops a crush on a student in his class named Echo Zizzleswift (Matreya Fedor). However, because he is only 14, his students have little respect for him, and he often gets into trouble with the principal, George Tater (Milo Shandel) for his childlike behavior.

== Episodes ==
Season	Episodes	Originally released	
Season	Episodes	First released	Last released
1	26	March 1, 2011	December 13, 2011
2	26	January 12, 2012	October 9, 2012
3	28	October 16, 2012	November 28, 2013

== Cast and characters ==
=== Main ===
- Brendan Meyer as Adam Young, a child science prodigy who graduated from college at age 14. After graduating, Adam was promptly offered a job at NASA, but declined, as he was more interested in a job that would allow him to help others and live out the high school experience he never got. He has a crush on one of his students, Echo, and goes to great lengths to impress her, often with disastrous results. They officially become a couple in Mr. First Impression. At the end of the series, he graduates from Finnegan along with his students and becomes a college professor.
- Matreya Fedor as Echo Zizzleswift, a student at Finnegan High School who is in Adam's science class. Echo cares deeply about the environment and other people. She is thoughtful, socially aware, a bit gullible, and secretly loves everything to do with science fiction. She is oblivious to Adam's crush on her, though the two become a couple in Mr. First Impression. In the finale, she graduates Finnegan and attends Adam's science class at a local university.
- Gig Morton as Derby von Derbotsford, a dimwitted student at Finnegan High School and Adam's childhood best friend with whom he reconnects once he begins teaching at Finnegan. He has a crush on Adam's sister Ivy but is always rejected and ignored by her. Derby is a class clown and a skilled prankster. In the finale, he graduates from Finnegan and begins attending Adam's science class at a local university.
- Kurt Ostlund as Jordan "Slab" Slabinsky, the doltish bully of Finnegan High School, whose aggressive behavior secretly stems from a desire to conceal his feelings of inadequacy. Though his exact age is never explicitly given, it is stated that he is an adult rather than a teenager like the rest of the main cast due to having had to repeat several years of high school as a result of his lack of intelligence. In Mr. Memory, he starts dating Ivy. In the finale, he finally graduates from Finnegan after 12 years of high school and begins attending Adam's science class at a local university.
- Emily Tennant as Ivy Young, Adam's popular, beautiful older sister with a love of fashion and an egocentric, shallow personality. She begins dating Slab in Mr. Memory. In the series finale, it is revealed she had to repeat senior year three times due to her dim wits. She also is a reporter for the school newspaper, along with Echo. In the series finale, she finally graduates from Finnegan and begins attending her brother's science class at a local university.
- Milo Shandel as George Tater, the principal of Finnegan High School. Despite being the school principal, Tater is shown to be both intellectually and socially stunted, and is not respected or favored by a majority of the Finnegan student body. Tater often undermines Adam due to the latter's juvenescence, despite Tater himself having childish tendencies (for example, he still heavily relies on his mother, whom he affectionately refers to as "mommy"). He is incredibly stingy and reluctant to spend money on school endeavors, even going as far as to cut essential programs such as science and hire dolls as teachers. Tater is also deeply insecure about his job as a high school principal and his baldness, both of which he reacts to with great offence if others point them out. It is implied that Tater may be the biological father of Adam and Ivy, as it is revealed that he had an affair with their mother in high school and that the Young siblings never knew their father.

=== Recurring ===
- Paula Shaw as Ms. Byrne, an elderly, clueless history teacher who is in charge of the science club and school newspaper. She has very bad memory and obsessively teaches and re-teaches her class about the War of 1812. A running gag in the show is her age - though a numerical value is never given, there are several points at which she alludes to being several hundred or even thousands of years old. In the finale, she swallows some water from the Fountain of Youth, causing her to temporarily revert to her younger self and begin a relationship with Dang's mentor (which they continue even after it wears off).
- Raugi Yu as Dang, the school janitor from Vietnam. A running gag is that he will appear out of nowhere when people mention him by name, followed by his catchphrase, "You called?" He is a very skilled martial artist, though he never completed high school and lives in the janitor's closet at Finnegan. In the finale, Adam helps him graduate and he begins attending Adam's science class at a local university.
- Anna Galvin as Rachel Young, the single mother of Ivy and Adam. Though she cares for her children, she can occasionally be indifferent to their feelings, such as selling Adam's comic book collection without his knowledge. In high school, she dated Tater, and it is implied that he may be Ivy and Adam's father.
- Brett Dier as Hutch Anderson, Ivy's crush and on-and-off boyfriend.

== Production ==
The series was created and executive produced by Dan Signer. The series was filmed in front of a live studio audience at 5828 Byrne Road, in Burnaby, British Columbia.

The series began taping on Thursday, September 30, 2010 and production of Season 1 was completed on Friday, April 15, 2011. Through their Facebook page, YTV announced on March 31, 2011, that Mr. Young was the No. 1 show on their network. On April 29, 2011, the series was renewed for a second season. Filming of Season 2 began in early July 2011 and continued through to January 2012. Afterwards, the show had a third season of 28 episodes, bringing the episode total to 80 episodes. This third and final season aired from October 16, 2012, to November 28, 2013.

== Broadcast and release ==
On September 7, 2011, Corus Entertainment's Nelvana and Thunderbird Films announced that they had sold the live-action comedy series to Disney XD channels United States, United Kingdom, Ireland, South Africa, Australia, and New Zealand. Nelvana is the international distribution agent for Mr. Young, while Nelvana and Thunderbird are co-distributing the series in the United States.
