= List of So Weird episodes =

So Weird is a television series shot in Vancouver, British Columbia that aired on the Disney Channel as a midseason replacement from January 18, 1999, to September 28, 2001. The series at first centered on teenage girl Fiona "Fi" Phillips (Cara DeLizia) who toured with her rock star mom (Mackenzie Phillips), encountering paranormal activity along the way. Acting as an X-Files for the younger crowd, the series took a darker tone than other Disney Channel Originals. During the third and final season, DeLizia left the series and was replaced with Alexz Johnson playing Annie Thelen as the series lead. The third season also opted for a lighter tone than the previous two to appeal to younger audiences.

== Series overview ==
Season	Episodes	Originally released	
Season	Episodes	First released	Last released
1	13	January 18, 1999	April 26, 1999
2	26	August 27, 1999	August 19, 2000
3	26	August 28, 2000	September 28, 2001

== Episodes ==
=== Season 1 (1999) ===
No. overall	No. in season	Title	Directed by	Written by	Original release date	Prod. code
1	1	"Family Reunion"	Shawn Levy	Tom J. Astle	January 18, 1999	101
Molly Phillips, a touring musician, prepares to perform at a Chicago waterfront. Her daughter, Fi, investigates the death of a boy on the SS Eastland accident who still haunts the building where his body was brought following the disaster, present-day Harpo Productions.
2	2	"Web Sight"	Charles Wilkinson	Sean Abley	January 18, 1999	104
An anonymous e-mailer sends Fi articles, sound bites, and videos that predict the future.
3	3	"Memory"	Rick Stevenson	Jon Weisman	January 25, 1999	103
En route to Tulsa, Fi and the gang visit a town where it seems aliens have repressed the memories of everyone in the town after their ship crash-landed the previous night.
4	4	"Sacrifice"	Alan Simmonds	Bruce Zimmerman	February 1, 1999	105
While lost in the woods, Fi helps Bigfoot remain undetected by humans and learns about a brave soldier who gave his life for the creature.
5	5	"Escape"	Charles Wilkinson	Doug Jung	February 8, 1999	102
The gang visits a carnival where Fi is haunted by a ghost who wanders around. Shortly after, Fi finds out the "ghost" is really the soul of a girl who uses astral projection to escape her problems.
6	6	"Simplicity"	Michael Kennedy	W.K. Scott Meyer	February 15, 1999	107
The gang stops at a town called "Simplicity" where gremlins are destroying all sorts of technology.
7	7	"Angel"	Paul Lynch	Chris Mack	February 22, 1999	106
Fi thinks a strange man that ran Molly's bus off the road may be The Angel of Death with an important message for Fi about a local farm girl.
8	8	"Strangeling"	Patrick Williams	Brian Nelson	March 1, 1999	108
While visiting her aunt and twin cousins, Fi inadvertently conjures up a creature using a Celtic spell.
9	9	"Rebecca"	Michael Kennedy	Eric Morris	March 15, 1999	109
Molly runs into a girl who looks exactly like her childhood friend, Rebecca, claiming to be Rebecca's daughter. Fi discovers the girl is Rebecca and that she has stayed the same for ages because she belongs to a clan of immortals.
10	10	"Tulpa"	Gary Harvey	Tom J. Astle	March 29, 1999	111
Fi tries to help a boy with a destructive imaginary friend, a tulpa.
11	11	"Singularity"	Patrick Williams	Jon Weisman	April 5, 1999	110
Clu is sucked into a singularity at a curmudgeon's backyard and it is up to Fi to rescue him.
12	12	"Lost"	Patrick Williams	Story by : Jon Cooksey & Ali Marie Matheson; Teleplay by : Jim Praytor & Andi Bushell	April 12, 1999	112
Fi uses the Internet and a Sims-style computer game to help a hospitalized young woman escape the confines of her mind and wake up from her decade-long coma.
13	13	"Will o' the Wisp"	Gary Harvey	Kevin Murphy	April 26, 1999	113
While viewing the ghost lights of Marfa, a mischievous will o' the wisp takes over Jack's body and freezes time, leaving Fi to decipher the riddle of his name or the creature will inhabit Jack's body permanently.

=== Season 2 (1999–2000) ===
No. overall	No. in season	Title	Directed by	Written by	Original release date	Prod. code
14	1	"Medium"	Gary Harvey	Tom J. Astle	August 27, 1999	201
Fi tries to contact her father through a spiritual medium who would rather debunk the phonies instead of using his abilities for good.
15	2	"Drive"	Paul Lynch	Sean Abley	September 3, 1999	202
Jack and Clu buy a used car that began to drive itself after a woman died of a heart attack before she could get to the hospital in the same car, driven by her husband. Now the car will keep trying to make it to said destination.
16	3	"Siren"	Gary Harvey	Brian Nelson	September 10, 1999	203
When Carey falls for a young female singer with a beautiful voice, Fi discovers the girl is a siren and is being exploited by Molly's ex-manager.
17	4	"Nightmare"	Paul Lynch	Gene Grillo	September 17, 1999	204
Fi, Jack and Clu find that they are having a shared nightmare that may be related to a frightened boy.
18	5	"Listen"	Gary Harvey	Andi Bushell & Jim Praytor	September 24, 1999	205
As the band is doing a concert at a farm town for charity, Fi notices the townspeople have the ability to read minds and discovers it may be caused by the wheat from a field branded by a crop circle.
19	6	"Mutiny"	Francis Damberger	Eleah Horwitz	October 1, 1999	206
Clu finds a piece of driftwood from a sunken ship and Ned becomes possessed by the spirit of a sea captain who was on the ship when it sank.
20	7	"Boo"	Mark Jean	Tom J. Astle	October 8, 1999	211
A Halloween gig in a strange New England town called Rhiannon turns into a nightmare when Fi discovers that the spirits of the dead walk the night on Halloween and lure the living back to their graves.
21	8	"Werewolf"	Philip Spink	Josh Stolberg	October 15, 1999	207
While at a bed and breakfast, Fi suspects that the animal preying on local farms may be a werewolf.
22	9	"Second Generation"	Francis Damberger	Jon Weisman	October 22, 1999	208
Fi meets a young man who turns out to be one of his scientist father's experiments.
23	10	"OOPA"	Michael Kennedy	W.K. Scott Meyer	November 5, 1999	209
A rich, nerdy computer genius who is attracted to Molly gives Fi gets the opportunity to examine a mysterious artifact that turns out to be an ancient computing device.
24	11	"Banshee"	John Pozer	Jon Cooksey & Ali Marie Matheson	November 12, 1999	210
Fi fears that a banshee has come to announce the impending death of her grandfather.
25	12	"Strange Geometry"	Mark Jean	Jon Weisman	November 19, 1999	213
As Molly shoots a music video in an abandoned building, Fi discovers a portal to the spirit world created by the owner.
26	13	"Fountain"	Patrick Williams	Jennifer Cecil	December 10, 1999	212
While the family prepares for Christmas, a depressed Fi stumbles upon a 1950s-style soda shop where Santa Claus the soda jerk serves Fi a cocoa drink that takes her back to childhood.
27	14	"Fall"	Marni Banack	Jennifer Cecil	January 7, 2000	214
Ned's childhood friend, Sam, gets caught up in the reenactment of a tragic childhood accident where Ned and Sam watched their best friend die.
28	15	"Destiny"	Patrick Williams	Kevin Murphy & Josh Stolberg	January 21, 2000	222
The Will o' the Wisp that once possessed Jack returns and, this time, jumps into Molly. It once again plays with Fi's mind and reveals a secret to her.
29	16	"Blues"	Rick Stevenson	Bruce Zimmerman	February 11, 2000	216
Fi discovers that a murdered blues singer is channeling the mortal world when everyone in Fi's family begins singing one of his songs.
30	17	"Avatar"	Paul Lynch	Jeff Vlaming	February 25, 2000	217
Molly, Jack and Carey find themselves trapped in a succession of virtual realities by a lonely young man, while Fi tries to figure out where they are.
31	18	"James Garr"	Paul Lynch	Story by : Doris Egan; Teleplay by : Doris Egan & Jon Weisman	March 18, 2000	218
Fi discovers that a cancer patient named James Garr was cryogenically frozen but is incapable of feeling and acting human, as his soul left his body during cryogenic stasis. Meanwhile, Jack befriends a dying old man who may be the key to James Garr regaining his humanity.
32	19	"Troll"	Rick Stevenson	Brian Nelson	April 1, 2000	219
A troll stops the gang at a bridge and turns the ones who cannot answer its questions into garden vegetables.
33	20	"Fathom"	Paul Lynch	Gene Grillo	April 22, 2000	220
Jack thinks their mother's new love interest is a merman.
34	21	"Roswell"	Rick Stevenson	Andi Bushell & Jim Praytor	May 6, 2000	221
Fi meets a homeless man who turns out to be in possession of an artifact from the 1947 Roswell UFO crash.
35	22	"Vampire"	Patrick Williams	Jay Bryant	May 20, 2000	215
Fi learns that an online study program, OSSN, is actually a cover for a group of vampires looking to make Jack a member of their clan.
36	23	"Shelter"	John Pozer	Josh Stolberg & Kevin Murphy	June 3, 2000	225
When Fi tries to investigate a suspicious situation at an animal shelter, the veterinarian injects her with a serum that turns Fi into a dog.
37	24	"Encore"	Larry Sugar	Jon Cooksey & Ali Marie Matheson	August 12, 2000	223
Flooded by memories of Rick and all the strange things that have happened while on the road, Molly decides to end the tour and go home, much to Fi's dismay.
38	25	"Transplant"	Patrick Williams	Bruce Zimmerman	August 19, 2000	224
Fi thinks a family friend, John "Papa Bear" Kane, who received a heart transplant may be possessed by the donor when he loses his ability to play the guitar and becomes obsessed with creating a sculpture.
39	26	"Twin"	Patrick Williams	Josh Stolberg	August 19, 2000	226
Fi believes her dead father is trying to communicate from beyond the grave through his twin sister.

=== Season 3 (2000–01) ===
No. overall	No. in season	Title	Directed by	Written by	Original release date	Prod. code
40	1	"Lightning Rod"	Paul Lynch	Tom J. Astle	August 28, 2000	301
Fi decides to live with her aunt in order to forget the supernatural and resume a normal life, receiving another visit from the Will 'O Wisp at the same time that Annie Thelen, a family friend joins the tour. Fi learns that Annie has a supernatural aura around her too, especially when Bricriu mentions that Annie is protected. Note: This is Cara DeLizia's final appearance in the series.
41	2	"Talking Board"	John Pozer	Bruce Zimmerman	September 7, 2000	302
Annie and her friends play with a Ouija board that seems to be able to predict the future for real.
42	3	"Detention"	Paul Lynch	John Mandel	September 14, 2000	303
While at Hope Springs High School with former student Molly, Jack and Annie are put in an endless detention class in the 1970s by strange watches.
43	4	"Eddie's Desk"	John Pozer	John Mandel	September 21, 2000	304
While still in Hope Springs, Annie encounters the spirit of a boy who may be the soul of a janitor who was bullied for years. Meanwhile, Clu comes home from college for a visit.
44	5	"Voodoo"	Paul Lynch	Bruce Zimmerman	September 28, 2000	305
Annie and the gang meet an old family friend of Annie's, who accidentally curses Molly and Annie by way of voodoo.
45	6	"Banglebye"	John Pozer	Alan Levy	October 5, 2000	306
All the kids in town, including Jack and Clu, become obsessed with a video game. Annie discovers the game was designed by a former hypnotist to brainwash the children into behaving properly so his wife won't have to endure rowdy kids in the neighborhood.
46	7	"Rewind"	Patrick Williams	Sean Abley	October 12, 2000	307
Molly stops by a recording studio headed by a woman who uses a supernatural ability to steal musical talent from her clients and transfer it to her reluctant daughter. Meanwhile, Annie hears a strange message in the studio that may be a warning.
47	8	"Exit 13"	John Pozer	Christopher Fife	October 19, 2000	308
At a rest stop Annie buys a mysterious Native American stone from a man named Ziegler and learns the stone causes bad luck and sends people in a time loop. The events of the day repeat themselves until Annie helps the girl engraved on the stone reconnect with her twin sister.
48	9	"Carnival"	Patrick Williams	Brian Nelson	November 2, 2000	310
While visiting a carnival, Molly and the gang are kidnapped and brainwashed into becoming sideshow freaks while Annie tries to search for a way to break the spell.
49	10	"Earth 101"	Francis Damberger	Jeff Vlaming	November 9, 2000	311
When Annie encounters two aliens studying humans the family is delayed from Thanksgiving dinner with Fi. Note: Fi's cameo appearance was created by using a vocal recording from a previous episode and a look-alike stand-in.
50	11	"Beeing There"	Isabelle Fox	Tom Nursall	November 16, 2000	312
En route to their next concert, the gang stop by a town called Hiveburg where the residents act like bees.
51	12	"Changeling"	Francis Damberger	Bill Conway	December 7, 2000	313
Annie and the boys are stuck babysitting a strange creature called a changeling.
52	13	"Snapshot"	Melissa Joan Hart	Richard Clark	December 14, 2000	309
Annie encounters an ambitious photographer whose camera steals souls, turning people into immature pranksters.
53	14	"Still Life"	Patrick Williams	Bruce Zimmerman	December 21, 2000	314
Molly buys a painting that sucks everyone in and Annie learns that the artist who created the picture trapped himself inside it to escape the real world.
54	15	"Grave Mistake"	John Pozer	Christopher Fife	March 2, 2001	315
The Phillips' family friend, Margaret, comes to visit and brings along the ghost of her dead husband who urges her to join her in the afterlife.
55	16	"Pen Pal"	Patrick Williams	John Mandel	March 16, 2001	316
When parallel worlds collide, Annie enlists Fi's help to correct the collision and learns only one Annie can survive in the world and must fight for her rightful space.
56	17	"The Muse"	Michael Ray Rhodes	Bruce Zimmerman	April 6, 2001	317
Annie thinks a brash young man named Quinn may be a muse who can give anyone inspiration to do anything creative.
57	18	"The Great Incanto"	Paul Lynch	Jeff Vlaming	May 4, 2001	318
After picking up a young magician hitchhiking, Annie learns he stole his former master's bag of magic and now the Great Incanto wants it back.
58	19	"Meow"	John Pozer	Eleah Horwitz	May 11, 2001	320
When visiting an Egyptian museum, Annie encounters a cat belonging to an Egyptian princess who wants her beloved pet back.
59	20	"Widow's Walk"	Paul Lynch	Jennifer Furlong	June 8, 2001	319
An old woman who waited fifty years to see her husband wishes she were young again, and ends up switching ages with Annie when the latter wishes to be old enough to have the same privileges as Jack and Carey.
60	21	"Babble"	Patrick Williams	Richard Clark	June 29, 2001	321
While at school, Annie discovers the new boy owns a stone from the Tower of Babel that causes people to speak gibberish.
61	22	"Gone Fishin'"	Patrick Williams	John Mandel	August 10, 2001	323
With Molly on vacation, Irene takes Annie and Jack on a fishing trip where Annie discovers the lake used to be a flooded town where some townspeople evolved into sea monsters attacking the people of the new town.
62	23	"Mr. Magnetism"	Paul Lynch	Ethan Lawrence	August 17, 2001	322
During a school science fair Annie meets a troubled boy who gains the power of magnetism and uses it to abuse others.
63	24	"Dead Ringer"	Gregg Baxter	John Mandel & Bruce Zimmerman	August 24, 2001	324
Alone in the house, Jack believes he is being haunted by his dead neighbor over something he did when he was six years old.
64	25	"Annie's Song"	Erik A. Berringer	Noreen Tobin & Gene F. O'Neill	September 7, 2001	325
While at a Native American tourist site, Annie meets a shaman who shows Annie her past, revealing the reason why the black panther is her spirit guide.
65	26	"The River"	Larry Sugar	John Mandel & Bruce Zimmerman	September 28, 2001	326
In this clip show episode, Ziegler from "Exit 13" gives Annie a package containing a spell that makes the gang lose their memory about Annie. Annie tries to refresh everyone's memories using anecdotes from their past adventures.
