= Sitting Ducks =

Sitting Ducks may refer to:

- Sitting Ducks (lithograph), a 1977 artwork by Michael Bedard
  - Sitting Ducks (TV series), a 2001 animated series based on the lithograph
- Sitting Ducks (film), a 1980 American comedy

== See also ==
- The Sitting Duck, a 2022 French-German thriller
- Sitting duck (target), an easy target
