= Anna's Dream =

2002 television film

- Written by: Bill Bickley; William Bickley
- Directed by: Colin Bickley
- Starring: Connie Sellecca; Richard Thomas; Lindsay Felton; Cara DeLizia; Melissa Schuman; Tyler Goucher; Courtney Jines
- Country of origin: United States
- Original language: English

Production
- Running time: 90 minutes

Original release
- Network: Pax TV
- Release: September 20, 2002

Anna's Dream is an American television film directed by Colin Bickley, starring former Caitlin's Way star Lindsay Felton as Anna Morgan and former So Weird star Cara DeLizia as Beth Morgan. It aired on Pax TV on September 20, 2002.

== Plot ==
Eighteen-year-old Anna Morgan becomes a paraplegic after a gymnastics accident. Her whole world has changed. Anna has to repeat her junior year of high school after missing school to go to therapy, her boyfriend ignores her, she loses her friends, and her parents treat her like a helpless child. Anna is befriended by a stranger, whose life changed overnight. He tells Anna that she can't get her old life back, but he can offer her hope.

== Cast ==
- Connie Sellecca as Leslie Morgan
- Richard Thomas as Roderick "Rod" Morgan
- Lindsay Felton as Anna Morgan
- Cara DeLizia as Elizabeth "Beth" Morgan
- Tyler Goucher as John Morgan
- Courtney Jines as Julie Morgan
- Matthew Newton as Neil Kennedy
- Don Franklin as Thomas "Tommy" Thompson

== See also ==
- Elena Mukhina
- Julissa Gomez
- Sang Lan
- Little Girls in Pretty Boxes (film)
