= The Santa Claus Brothers =

2001 Christmas TV special

- Created by: Michael Bedard
- Written by: Jon Cooksey; Ali Marie Matheson
- Directed by: Mike Fallows
- Voices of: Bryan Cranston; Caroline Rhea; Richard Kind; Kevin McDonald; Harland Williams; Joe Flaherty
- Music by: Brent Barkman; Peter Coulman; Carl Lenox; Eric Schenkman; Tim Thorney; Tom Thorney
- Countries of origin: Canada; United States
- Original language: English

Production
- Executive producers: Michael Hirsh; Patrick Loubert; Clive A. Smith
- Producer: Pam Lehn
- Editor: Richard Bond
- Running time: 47 minutes
- Production companies: Nelvana Limited; Sitting Ducks Productions; Film Roman

Original release
- Network: YTV (Canada); Disney Channel (United States)
- Release: December 13, 2001

The Santa Claus Brothers is a 2001 animated Christmas television special created by Michael Bedard. Co-produced by Nelvana, Sitting Ducks Productions, and Film Roman, for YTV and the Disney Channel, this comic Christmas tale features the voices of Bryan Cranston, Caroline Rhea, Richard Kind, Kevin McDonald, Harland Williams, and Joe Flaherty. It premiered on December 13, 2001.

In 2002, it won a Daytime Emmy Award for Outstanding Individual in Animation.

== Summary ==
Santa Claus has three sons, Roy, Daryl, and Mel, and all of them are talented. They share their father's gift for toy making and scientific genius, but they have little understanding of the true meaning of Christmas. Santa would like to retire and have the sons take over, so he proposes a contest: whichever one of his triplets can first understand the true meaning of the holiday can inherit the family business.

== Cast ==
- Bryan Cranston as Santa "Nick" Claus
- Caroline Rhea as Bernice Claus, Santa's wife
- Richard Kind as Roy Claus, the eldest of Santa's sons
- Kevin McDonald as Mel Claus, the youngest of Santa's sons
- Harland Williams as Daryl Claus, the middle of Santa's sons
- Joe Flaherty as Snorkel, the head elf
- Scott McCord as Busby, Snorkel's assistant
- Stephanie Beard as Luisa, a little girl who Roy befriends
- Noah Reid as Christopher, a 13-year old boy who Daryl befriends
- Ronnie Burkett as Bert, a hobo who Mel befriends

== Reception ==
A review in The Globe and Mail lauded The Santa Claus Brothers for "[using] satire to tell a not-too-heavy-handed lesson about the true meaning of Christmas", saying that "Bedard's touch gives the characters a goofy charm".

== Broadcast and Streaming ==
In addition to the United States, Disney Channel also secured pay broadcast rights to the special in Europe, Middle East, Asia and Australia.

In January 2002, Nelvana International secured a European home video deal with British distributor Momentum Pictures.

The film can be viewed in YouTube and Amazon Prime Video.

== See also ==
- List of Christmas films
