= Cara DeLizia =

American actress

- Occupation: Actress
- Years active: 1989–2012
- Spouse: Nick Rich (m. 2009)

Cara DeLizia is an American former actress. She is best known for her role as Fiona "Fi" Phillips in the Disney Channel Original Series So Weird.

== Career ==
=== Early career ===
DeLizia got her start in acting at the age of five doing theater productions. She was later discovered and starred regularly in the WB's Nick Freno: Licensed Teacher. Later she had guest spots on Mad About You, 7th Heaven, The West Wing (in "The Stackhouse Filibuster"), Strong Medicine, and ER. She has also starred in several TV movies and had minor roles in several motion pictures such as Sleepless in Seattle and Avalon. She co-starred in You're Invited to Mary-Kate and Ashley's Sleepover Party, starring former Full House stars Mary-Kate Olsen and Ashley Olsen.

=== So Weird ===
In her breakout role on So Weird, DeLizia played Fiona "Fi" Phillips, an adolescent girl fascinated with the paranormal. She left the show after the first two seasons and was replaced by Alexz Johnson. The show had been "darker" for a Disney show in the vein of The X-Files, but when DeLizia departed, the show took on a lighter tone for the remainder of its run.

=== Later work ===
DeLizia's other major role was as Marcy Kendall on the FOX drama Boston Public, where she played the assistant to Chi McBride's Principal Harper.

She voiced Z, a minor character introduced in the spinoff Rugrats series, All Grown Up. In 2002, DeLizia co-starred in Anna's Dream alongside former Caitlin's Way star Lindsay Felton.

== Personal life ==
In December 2009, she married Nick Rich.

== Filmography ==
=== Movies ===
Year	Title	Role	Notes
1995	You're Invited to Mary-Kate & Ashley's Sleepover Party	Herself	Direct-to-video
1995	Under the Gun	Daughter	Uncredited
1997	Crayola Kids Adventures: Tales of Gulliver's Travels	Cara – Queen of the Big Enders	Direct-to-video
1997	Crayola Kids Adventures: The Trojan Horse	Atheniea	Direct-to-video
2011	Rogue	Kit	
2012	Homecoming	Young Bobby	Voice role

=== Television ===
Year	Title	Role	Notes
1992	Literary Visions	Actor	Television documentary
1996–1997	Nick Freno: Licensed Teacher	Sarah	Main role, 22 episodes
1997	Don King: Only in America	Teen Girl #1	Television movie
1999	7th Heaven	Glenda	Episode: "Sometimes That's Just the Way It Is"
1999	Mad About You	Teenage Mabel Buchman	Episode: "The Final Frontier: Part 2"
1999–2000	So Weird	Fiona 'Fi' Phillips	Lead role (seasons 1 & 2); guest role (season 3)
2000	ER	Andrea Parks	Episode: "Be Patient"
2001	The Wild Thornberrys: The Origin of Donnie	Baru	Voice role; television movie
2001	Close to Home	Alison	Television movie
2001	NYPD Blue	Joanna	Episode: "Writing Wrongs"
2001	The West Wing	Winifred Hooper	Episode: "The Stackhouse Filibuster"
2001	Go Fish	Lisa	Episodes: "Go Student Council", "Go Wrestling"
2001	Strong Medicine	Felicity Farber	Episode: "Rebirth"
2001	The Nightmare Room	Vanessa	Episode: "The Howler"
2001	Just Shoot Me!	Randy	Episode: "Maya Judging Amy"
2002	As Told by Ginger	Laetitia Bowers	Voice role; episode: "New Girl in Town"
2002	Anna's Dream	Elizabeth "Beth" Morgan	Television movie
2002–2003	Boston Public	Marcie Kendall	Recurring role, 15 episodes
2003	Twins	N/A	Television movie
2003–2004	All Grown Up!	Z	Voice role; episodes: "Bad Kimi", "It's Cupid, Stupid"
2004	Still Life	Willa	2 episodes; never-aired television series
2004	JAG	Midshipman Emma Green	Episode: "One Big Boat"
2004	Love's Enduring Promise	Annie Walker	Television movie
2006	Mr. Nice Guy	Max	Unsold television pilot
2006	Ghost Whisperer	Libby Grant	Episode: "Dead Man's Ridge"
2007	Close to Home	Kaitlin Howard	Episode: "Hoosier Hold Em"
