= Highland Hall Waldorf School =

Alternative school in California, United States

Location
- 17100 Superior Street; Northridge, California 91325
- 34.2456°N 118.5057°W

Information
- School type: Private School
- Established: 1955; 71 years ago
- Grades: Nursery -12
- Colors: Blue; White
- Nickname: Hawks
- Accreditation: WASC
- Website: www.highlandhall.org

Highland Hall Waldorf School is an independent alternative school located on a campus in Northridge, Los Angeles, California. It serves children from nursery through grade twelve with additional Parent and Child classes. Established in 1955, the school is the first Waldorf school in the western United States and is one of approximately 1,000 Waldorf schools worldwide. The curriculum is based on the work of Rudolf Steiner.

== History of Highland Hall ==
Highland Hall Waldorf School was founded in 1955 in North Hollywood, California (on Riverside Drive.) It is the oldest Waldorf school in the western United States. In the early 1960s, Highland Hall outgrew the North Hollywood location and the administration decided to build a new campus on a hill in Northridge, California. The school currently resides at this location. The campus is divided into three parts: the Early Childhood Center, grades 1–8, and the high school (grades 9–12). Additional facilities on the campus include a biodynamic farm (including vegetable beds, orchard, chicken coop and beehives), gym, sports fields, wood/stone shop, blacksmithing, art rooms, science lab, archery range, and a small giftshop/coffee shop.

== Sport ==
Sports programs begin in middle school for grade 6 through 8. Girls' volleyball, girls' and boys' basketball and baseball are all offered at the middle school level. High school sports include women's and men's basketball, women's and men's volleyball, co-ed soccer, co-ed cross country, and co-ed track and field.

== Notable alumni ==
- Frances Bean Cobain, visual artist and model
- Neal Moore, writer and canoeist
- Mackenzie Phillips, actress and singer
- Claudia Previn, singer, actress and musician
- Nita Strauss, rock musician
- Lucy Walsh, singer, songwriter and actress
- Lisa Coleman and Wendy Melvoin, singers, songwriters, and former bandmates of Prince (Wendy & Lisa)
