= Siegi Sessler =

Siegi Sessler (9 September 1910 – 1 April 1969) was a prominent London restaurateur and club owner in the mid-20th century. He started club life after the Second World War, and opened Siegi's Club in 1950 at 46 Charles Street in London's Mayfair area. Siegi's became the first of the Mayfair establishments, later among Claremont Club, Annabel's, Tramp, Harry's Bar and The Colony Club. It was well known to be the 'home away from home' for Hollywood stars, such as Frank Sinatra, Humphrey Bogart, Bob Hope, Crosby, Niven, Brando, Monroe, John Wayne, Cary Grant, Bette Davis, Clark Gable, Doris Day, Joan Crawford, Ingrid Bergman and Elizabeth Taylor. It was described as "a sort of Madame Tussauds for live people... a safe haven for the friendless and a place impossible to leave, without a pocketful of introductions, for all four corners of the globe. You may not have wanted to lunch with Brando in LA, or safari with William Holden, at his Mt. Kenya Safari Club, however once out of the door, you were committed and often compelled to be their house guests, although a stranger...and you may have only popped in for a night cap before bed!" by columnist Marjorie Proops.

== Early life ==
Siegi was born in Kraków, Poland, on 9 September 1910. The eldest of 5 brothers and 2 sisters, he had managed to escape to England, for whom he fought in World War II. Only he and his brother Freddie survived the war.

== Post World War II ==
At the end of the war in 1945, he discovered his Uncle Max had survived and opened a restaurant in Swiss Cottage, North London. Taking the office above, he and partner John Mills had their start in London's club world. Their partnership ended with The Milroy Club and issues over Les Ambassadeurs. His first solo venture was the "La Rue", which later became The International Fine Arts Club, in Mayfair. He spent a considerable amount of time in America, helping Hollywood insiders impacted by McCarthyism, such as writer Carl Foreman, who at the time of his allegations was writing the script for "The Bridge on the River Kwai". He thanked Siegi by naming a character after him in the classic The Guns of Navarone. He was the Best Man to singer Pearl Bailey when she remarried. He enjoyed staying in Las Vegas' Sands Hotel or at New York's 21 Club. He liked to watch the New York Yankees play or see a title fight at Madison Square Garden. He had been a professional wrestler in Poland.

== Siegi's Club ==
Siegi's Club opened in 1950. It soon became known as one of London's finest restaurants, a favorite hideaway for its high profile clientele. Should Frank Sinatra and Dean Martin choose to entertain the lunchtime gathering with a few songs around the piano, the chances are that Sam Spiegel would ask them to "keep it down...I'm trying to work here!", or Groucho Marx would insist on "professional singers entertaining him over his lunch...Auditions by "buskers" gave him gas!"

Keith Richards, in his autobiography, Life, whilst talking about his brother Freddie, writes...

"Fred's brother Siegi, the only other surviving member of his family of seven children, was in Paris at the Sorbonne when the Germans invaded Poland. He joined the Polish army and later managed to get to England. Freddie joined him in London after the war. Siegi became club owner and restaurateur, co-owner of Les Ambassadeurs, which quickly became a hangout for four-star"

When he opened Siegi's Club in Charles Street, Mayfair, in 1950, he'd become personal friends with the likes of Frank Sinatra, Ronald Reagan and Bing Crosby. It became the 'hangout' of Princess Margaret, the Aga Khan. In 1960, the club enjoyed its 10-year anniversary, and a special edition book marked the event.

== Personal life ==
In 1958, Siegi was married to Barbara Anderson, a Kenya born beauty, who had come to England to be an actress, at the Edison Hotel, in New York City. In 1960, she gave birth to only son, Simon Edison Sessler. By 1965, however, ill health had started to take hold. He died on 1 April 1969, at just 58 years old, and was cremated at Golders Green Cemetery.

The club was sold shortly thereafter, to old friend, Mark Birley, owner of Annabel's. It became Mark's Club, which continues to this day to be one of the most exclusive clubs in London.
