= Dave Ward (voice actor) =

Scottish actor (born 1957)

- Born: 14 January 1957 (age 68); Glasgow, Scotland
- Other names: David "Squatch" Ward; Dave "Squatch" Ward; David Ward
- Occupation: Voice actor
- Years active: 1980–present
- Spouse: Lisa Ward (????–present)

David Ward (born 14 January 1957), commonly known as Dave "Squatch" Ward or David "Squatch" Ward, is a Scottish voice actor who has played roles in television and movies. His most popular starring roles have been on Dragon Ball, Aldo in Sitting Ducks, Gundam Wing, and the live-action role of Ned Bell in So Weird.

== Filmography ==
=== Animation ===
- The Adventures of Snowden the Snowman – Einstein / Mr. Bear
- Action Man – Additional Voices
- Being Ian – Male Nurse
- The Dragon Prince – Deadwood / Elmer
- Firehouse Tales – Stinky Bins
- Gadget & the Gadgetinis – Additional Voices
- Krypto the Superdog – Big Bad Wolf, Jackhammer Man, Mike
- Martha Speaks – Bob's owner
- Pucca – Muji
- Ricky Sprocket: Showbiz Boy – Additional Voices
- Sitting Ducks – Aldo
- What About Mimi? – Additional Voices
- Yakkity Yak – Chuck Damage
- Yvon of the Yukon – Killer Kolofski

=== Anime ===
- Dragon Ball – Ox-King / Rabbit Gang Member
- Dragon Ball Z – Ox-King
- Dragon Ball Z: Dead Zone – Ox-King
- Inuyasha – Kyokotsu
- Hamtaro – Elder Ham
- MegaMan NT Warrior – NoodleMan / PlanetMan
- Mobile Suit Gundam Wing – Master Long / Doctor J
- Tayo the Little Bus – Chris
- Transformers: Cybertron – Leobreaker

=== Live-action ===
- The Commish – Freddy
- Earthsea – Dunain
- Hawkeye – Sam
- So Weird – Ned Bell
- It's a Very Merry Muppet Christmas Movie – Sally Ann Santa
- Wyvern – Fisherman
- Alice – Walrus
- Ultraman Tiga – Ultraman Tiga (voice)
- Stargate SG-1 – Antagonistic Bar Guy
