= Freddie Sessler =

Drug dealer to the Rolling Stones

Freddie Sessler

Arden Frederick "Freddie" Sessler (26 May 1923 – 18 December 2000) was the brother of London restaurateur and club owner Siegi Sessler, and a long-term intimate of the Rolling Stones, particularly Keith Richards, to whom he supplied drugs. A raconteur, Sessler claimed to have met and become friends with a number of important figures in twentieth century music. He attributed his manic lifestyle of partying and drug use to being almost the only one of his family to escape extermination by the Nazis during the Second World War. Ronnie Wood described Sessler as a "sex-fuelled, vodka charged, coke mountain".

== Early life ==
Sessler was born in Kraków, Poland in 1923. He was one of seven children. He was aged 16 when the Nazis invaded Poland and Kraków became the Third Reich's administrative capital of the region. Initially, a Ghetto was created for the Jewish population of 200,000 (within two years there would be none left) during which time many, including his grandfather and youngest brother, who was four years old, were shot in the town square. Soon after, the regime began sending them to three concentration camps, Bełżec, Płaszów and Auschwitz, and Sessler and the surviving members of his immediate family were sent to Kraków-Płaszów concentration camp - from where he once again managed to escape, reaching Russia, only to find himself interned in Siberia. Breaking free once more, he made his way over to England where his fluency in English, Polish, Russian, German and Yiddish, saw him find work as a translator. After the war he returned to Poland to discover his entire family were dead and their home had been destroyed. He returned to London, where by chance, he found his elder brother Siegi had survived the war. It was he who gave him the funds and suggested he make a new start in New York.

== Jazz and the Beatles ==
In New York, Sessler got a job, initially, as a waiter and started to frequent places such as Birdland. Sessler told Bill German that when he was working at Lindy's, he mixed with Louis Armstrong, Duke Ellington, both friends of Siegi and Billie Holiday and it was at this time he began to procure but never sell drugs. His next venture would make him his first fortune, the Perma Weave hair piece.

In 1961, Sessler began spending much of his time in West Germany developing a new type of car. It was there he claimed to have seen the Beatles in Hamburg when they were unknown, and to have become good friends with John Lennon and Eric Clapton. His development finally came to fruition when, in 1963, he set up, with several partners, The Amphicar Corporation of America, as President of the company.

== The Rolling Stones ==
According to Ronnie Wood, Sessler loved being called "the ultimate Rolling Stones fan" and in his 70s, "the world's oldest rock and roll groupie".

=== Keith Richards ===
Sessler was particularly close to Keith Richards and Victor Bockris believes that Richards saw Sessler as a father figure. However, Sessler's lifestyle was problematic for Richards when later he was battling drug addiction. Early in his autobiography, Life, Richards calls Sessler, "an incredible character, my friend and almost a father to me who will have many parts in this story" and Sessler appears many times in Life.

=== Drugs ===
Glenn Hughes of Deep Purple and Black Sabbath remembered "I was also friends with Ron Wood and the guy who carried the Stones' pure pharmaceutical cocaine in the 60s and 70s, Freddie Sessler... I remember he put a huge mound of glittering, thick cocaine on a plate for me once" and Iggy Pop described him as "the kind of guy who can make a party happen". According to Ronnie Wood: "Freddie's real claim to fame was that he'd spent decades providing pharmaceuticals to everybody who was anybody in rock. I'm talking about a man who showed up with milk bottles full of high quality Mallencrodt and Merck." "Merck" cocaine was his specialty but, as Marilou Regan notes, Sessler claimed never to have been a "dealer" or "pusher", and never to have charged anyone anything for drugs, and he never had anything to do with heroin.

Julia Phillips, in You'll Never Eat Lunch in this Town Again, remembered going backstage at a Stones' concert: "There is a smelly Israeli [sic] named Freddie who seems to be very important to everybody. He carries two medium-sized bottles filled with rock cocaine."

Sessler lent his name to the slang used by the Stones. The drugs he supplied were known as "Sessler’s Helpers" and his coterie of groupies, who changed from tour to tour, were known as the "Sesslerettes".

== Business ventures ==
Sessler was involved in a number of dubious business ventures, including his Miami Venom Institute which used diluted snake venom to treat serious illnesses. One patient was the by then penniless Ronnie Lane of the Small Faces who was desperately searching for any possible cure from multiple sclerosis. When his Miami institute was closed down by the U.S. Food and Drug Administration (FDA), Sessler opened the Fairfield Hospital in Jamaica. He claimed that he made a fortune from selling aglets, another selling lightbulbs to the Empire State Building and that he had been involved with the Amphicar. Nothing ever worked out in the long term however and he said "I been a millionaire eight times, and I been broke eight times!"

== Personal life ==
Sessler was married three times. He had three sons, all of whom are deceased. One of them, Jeff, was briefly married to Mackenzie Phillips. Sessler died on 18 December 2000 (Keith Richards' birthday), aged 77. He is buried at the Hillside Memorial Park Cemetery in Los Angeles. Letters to Sessler from Keith Richards and Ronnie Wood were sold at auction by Bonhams in 2013.
