= Slither (2006 film) =

Science fiction comedy horror film by James Gunn

- American theatrical release poster
- Directed by: James Gunn
- Written by: James Gunn
- Produced by: Paul Brooks; Eric Newman
- Starring: Nathan Fillion; Elizabeth Banks; Gregg Henry; Michael Rooker
- Cinematography: Gregory Middleton
- Edited by: John Axelrad
- Music by: Tyler Bates
- Production companies: Brightlight Pictures; Gold Circle Films; Strike Entertainment
- Distributed by: TVA Films (Canada); Universal Pictures (United States)
- Release date: March 31, 2006
- Running time: 95 minutes
- Countries: Canada; United States
- Language: English
- Budget: $15 million
- Box office: $12.9 million

Slither is a 2006 horror comedy film written and directed by James Gunn in his directorial debut. The film stars Nathan Fillion, Elizabeth Banks, Tania Saulnier, Gregg Henry, and Michael Rooker. Its plot follows the residents of a small town in South Carolina that becomes invaded by a malevolent alien parasite.

Slither was theatrically released in the United States and Canada on March 31, 2006, by Universal Pictures and TVA Films respectively. It was a box office failure, grossing only $12 million worldwide against a $15 million budget, though received positive reviews from critics. The film has since gained a cult following among fans of Gunn's later works.

== Plot ==
A meteorite brings a malevolent, sentient extraterrestrial parasite to Earth. The parasite enters the town of Wheelsy, South Carolina, where it infects wealthy resident Grant by taking over his body and absorbing his mind. With the alien in control of him, Grant begins to transform into a grotesque, tentacled monstrosity. He also abducts and infects a local woman, Brenda, to serve as a breeder for his alien larvae. His wife Starla learns that he hasn't been to the doctor's in over a year and she becomes suspicious over the changes in his appearance and behavior, leading to Grant attacking her. When the police arrive to rescue Starla, Grant flees.

During their search for Grant, a posse led by police chief Bill Pardy discovers Brenda, whose body has become inhumanly bloated from the larvae growing inside her. The slug-like larvae burst from her body and infect everyone in town except Starla, Bill, Mayor Jack MacReady, and teenager Kylie Strutemyer (Starla, Bill and Jack realised that they could escape infection by covering their mouths and Kylie was able to pull the larvae out of her mouth before it could get too deeply inside). Those infected by the larvae become part of a hive mind controlled by Grant, who intends to consume all lifeforms until only his consciousness remains. However, Grant also retains his love for his wife and seeks to be reunited with her. Thanks to Kylie having glimpsed the hive mind before she was able to pull out her own larvae, the survivors deduce that killing Grant will eliminate the rest of the aliens before they are attacked by the infected townspeople. Bill and Kylie escape, but Starla and Jack are captured.

Armed with a grenade to kill the monster, Bill and Kylie head to Grant's home, where the infected are being absorbed by the increasingly mutated Grant. Jack and others are turned into breeders for more larvae, while Grant keeps Starla uninfected in the hope of regaining her love. After waking up, Starla arms herself with a sharp brush and goes downstairs to find Grant. She tricks him into believing she still loves him and stabs him with the brush. Grant becomes angry and throws her across the room. Bill and Kylie enter the house after shooting several alien townfolk, and euthanize an infected Jack after he begs for death. Bill tries to use the grenade, but Grant knocks it into the pool, then subdues Kylie with a couch and attempts to infect Bill with his tentacles. While one of the tentacles stabs Bill in the stomach, Bill attaches the other tentacle to a propane tank. Starla shoots Grant who, filled with flammable gas, explodes, killing the rest of the aliens and saving Bill. With everyone else in Wheelsy dead, the three survivors head off to seek help.

In a post-credits scene, a cat approaches Grant's remains and becomes infected by the alien parasite.

== Cast ==
- Nathan Fillion as Police Chief Bill Pardy
- Elizabeth Banks as Starla Grant
- Tania Saulnier as Kylie Strutemyer
- Gregg Henry as Mayor Jack MacReady
- Michael Rooker as Grant Grant
- Brenda James as Brenda Gutierrez
- Don Thompson as Wally
- Jennifer Copping as Margaret
- Jenna Fischer as Shelby Cunningham
- Haig Sutherland as Trevor

Additionally, William MacDonald and Iris Quinn portray Kylie's parents and Matreya Fedor and Amber Lee Bartlett portray her sisters Emily and Jenna. Other members of Bill's posse are played by Tom Heaton as Tourneur, Ben Cotton as Charlie, and Dee Jay Jackson as Dwight. Residents of Wheelsy include Dustin Milligan as a student in Starla's class, Lorena Gale as Starla's co-worker Janene, Darren Shahlavi as Brenda's husband, and Magda Apanowicz in an uncredited role as Kylie's friend. Troma Films co-founder Lloyd Kaufman has a cameo as a drunk man and Rob Zombie provides the voice of Grant's physician Dr. Karl. Director James Gunn makes an uncredited appearance as Hank, Starla's co-worker.

== Themes and influences ==
Controversy ensued over the many similarities and plot-points shared with Fred Dekker's 1986 horror-comedy Night of the Creeps. According to journalist Steve Palopoli:

When the trailer for Slither came out, Internet boards about the movie suddenly lit up with protests from a legion of fans of the 1986 film Night of the Creeps. "Alien slugs that turn people into zombies!" they cried. "What a rip-off!" I bring this up not because I think Slither— which is a tongue-in-cheek pastiche of at least a dozen '80s horror films—could really be considered a rip-off of any one of them.

Palopoli then goes on to directly compare Slither to the aforementioned Creeps as well as the 1975 film Shivers. Gunn has stated that both Cronenberg's Shivers and his 1979 film The Brood were the two biggest influences on the story in Slither, along with the 2000 manga Uzumaki by Junji Ito. In an interview with Jeff Schubert, Gunn also states that Slither was inspired by and pays homage to the horror-comedies from the 1980s.

The film pays homage to other horror films, such as a farm being owned by Castevet in reference to the Satan-worshiping next-door neighbors in Rosemary's Baby. Jack MacReady, the mayor of Wheelsy, is named after Kurt Russell's characters Jack Burton and R.J. MacReady from the John Carpenter films Big Trouble in Little China and The Thing.

== Home media ==
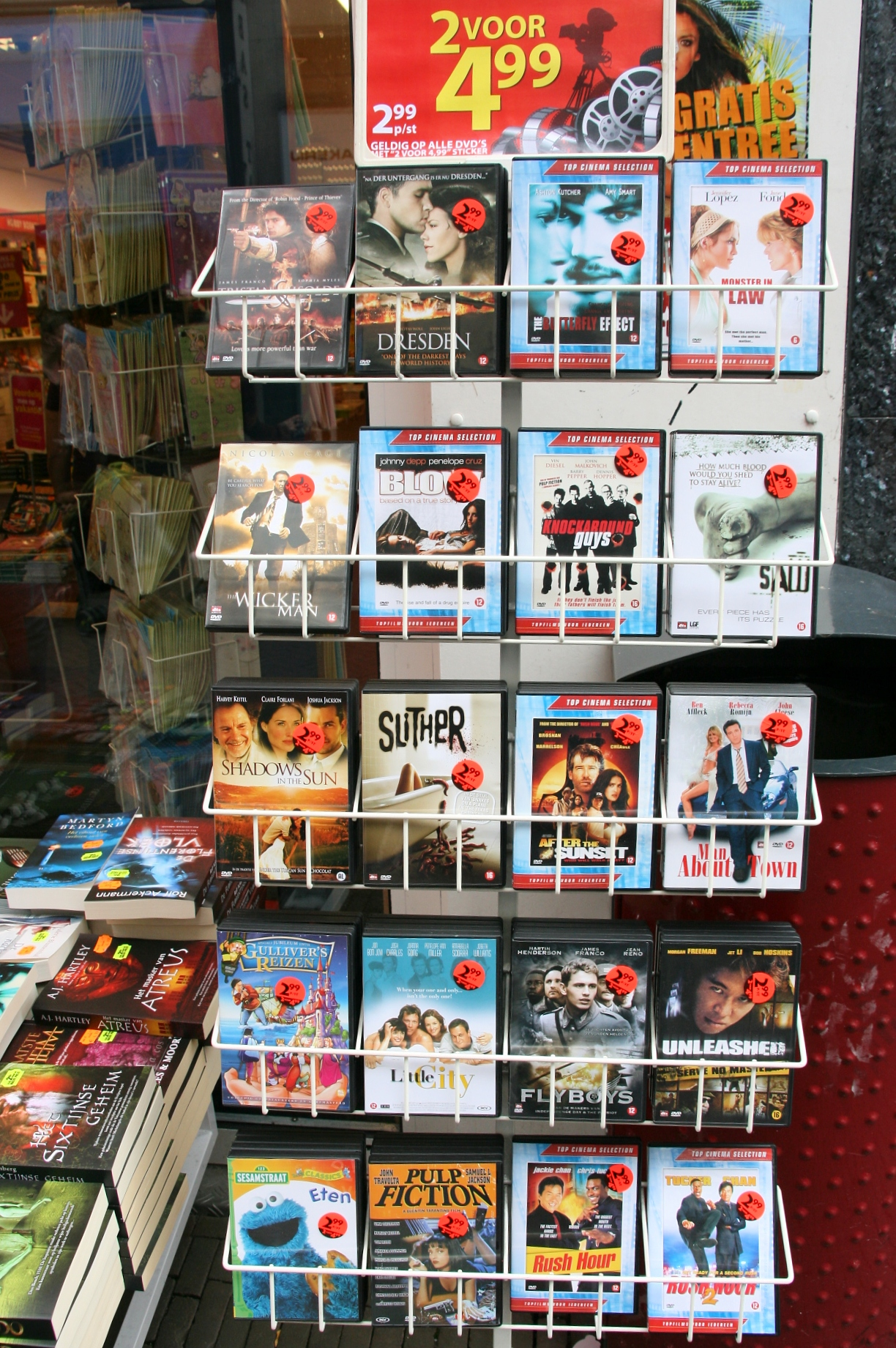
Slither among other discounted DVDs sold in the Netherlands

Slither was released on regular DVD and on HD-DVD/DVD hybrid disc on October 24, 2006. The HD version is presented in 1.85:1 widescreen encoded at 1080p and Dolby Digital-Plus 5.1 surround. In addition to the film, the DVD contains two making-of documentaries, deleted and extended scenes, a blooper reel, visual effects progressions, a set tour with Fillion, and an audio commentary by Gunn and Fillion. Also included are featurettes outlining how to make edible blood, and Lloyd Kaufman's documentary discussing his day on set, and the shooting of his one line (which was eventually cut from the film). Finally, there is a bonus entitled "Who Is Bill Pardy?" which is a joke feature made by Gunn with the sole purpose of roasting Fillion, and was shown at the film's wrap party.

Shout! Factory released a Collector's Edition on Blu-ray on July 25, 2017. In addition to new case artwork illustrated by artist Justin Osbourn, it includes new special features such as a new audio commentary with James Gunn and cast members, new interviews with James Gunn and actor Gregg Henry (Jack MacReady) as well as all of the special features found on the original DVD.

== Release ==
Universal Pictures distributed the film in the United States, Latin America, Australia, France, Germany, Italy, Spain and South Africa, while Mandate Pictures handled international sales excluding Canada, the United Kingdom and Japan, where Gold Circle Films and Strike Entertainment had pre-sold the film to TVA Films, Entertainment Film Distributors, and Toho-Towa respectively.

== Reception ==
=== Box office ===
Slither was a box office flop, failing to recoup its production budget following its debut in the United States and Canada on March 31, 2006, in 1,945 theaters. In its opening weekend, the film grossed $3,880,270 and ranked #8 at the U.S. and Canadian box office. Slither grossed $7,802,450 in its theatrical run in the United States and Canada. Slither also under-performed in France, grossing $236,261 from 150 screens. The film grossed $5,032,486 as of February 6, 2008 in territories outside the United States and Canada for a worldwide gross of $12,834,936. Its box office performance was substantially less than its total budget of $29.5 million, including marketing costs. The production budget took up about $15 million of the total.

Paul Brooks, president of the film's production company, Gold Circle Films, said the company was "crushingly disappointed" by the gross. Universal distanced itself from Slither's poor box office performance, citing their distribution of the film as merely part of a deal with Gold Circle. The Hollywood Reporter speculated that Slither's performance "might have killed off the horror-comedy genre for the near future." Producer Paul Brooks suggested that Slither failing to catch on indicated that filmgoers were no longer interested in horror-comedies.

=== Critical response ===
On review aggregator website Rotten Tomatoes, 87% of 141 reviews are positive, with an average rating of 6.9/10. The site's critics consensus reads, "A slimy, B-movie homage oozing with affection for low-budget horror films, Slither is creepy and funny — if you've got the stomach for it." On Metacritic, the film has a weighted average score of 69 out of 100, based on 27 critics, indicating "generally favorable reviews". Audiences polled by CinemaScore gave the film a grade of "B–" on its A+ to F scale.

The movie was featured in the April 14, 2006 issue of Entertainment Weekly as #1 on "The Must List"; "Ten Things We Love This Week". Guest critic Michael Phillips named Slither his DVD pick of the week on the television show Ebert & Roeper. Slither was listed as one of the "Top 25 DVDs of the Year" by Peter Travers in Rolling Stone magazine.

Among the critics who did not like the film, Roger Ebert and Richard Roeper gave Slither a "two thumbs down" rating on their television show, with Roeper saying he was "all zombied out" after reviewing a wave of zombie-themed films from the year before.

=== Accolades ===
Slither picked up the 2006 Fangoria "Chainsaw Award" for Highest Body Count and garnered nominations in the categories Relationship From Hell, Dude You Don't Wanna Mess With, and Looks That Kill. Additionally, the horror magazine Rue Morgue named Slither the "Best Feature Film of the Year".

== See also ==
- The Blob – a 1988 film about a parasite released from a meteorite
- Brain Damage – a 1988 film about a brain-eating parasite
- "The Colour Out of Space" – a 1927 short story by H. P. Lovecraft about a rural community besieged by an extraterrestrial lifeform that originates from a meteorite.
- The Deadly Spawn – 1983 film about an alien life-form that emerges from a fallen meteorite
