= Mackenzie Phillips =

American actress (born 1959)

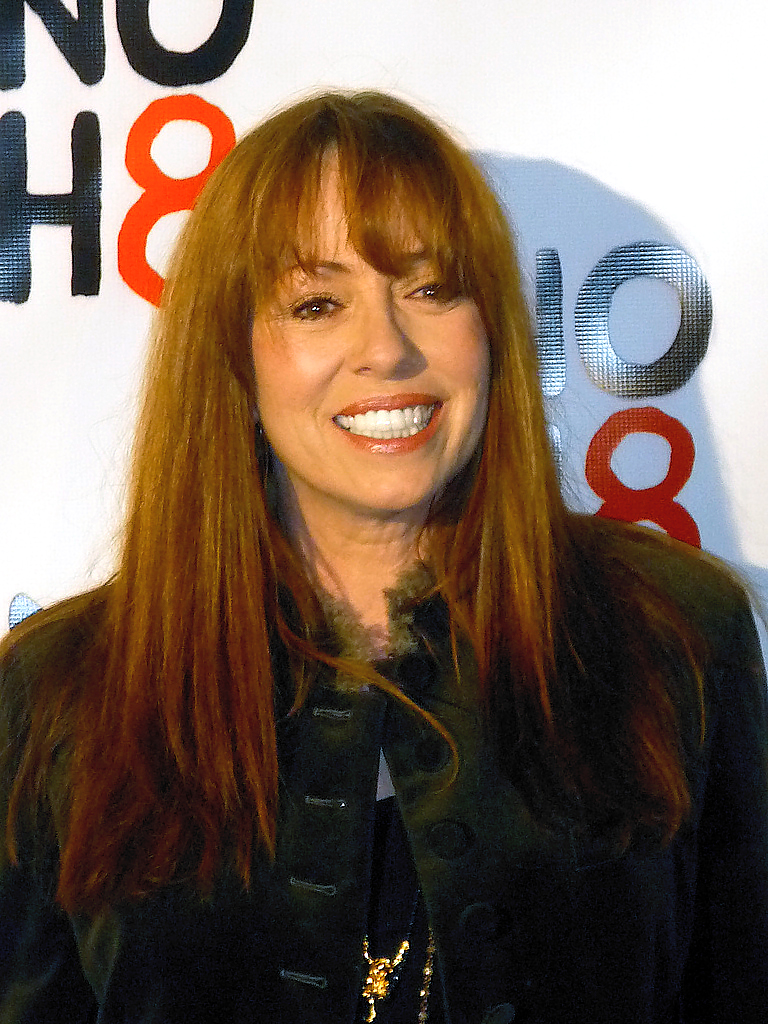
- Phillips in 2009
- Born: Laura Mackenzie Phillips; November 10, 1959 (age 66)
- Education: Highland Hall Waldorf School
- Occupations: Actress; singer; author
- Years active: 1972–present
- Known for: One Day at a Time; American Graffiti; So Weird
- Spouses: Jeff Sessler (m. 1979; div. 1981) Shane Fontayne (m. 1986; div. 2000) Keith Levenson (m. 2005; div. 2007)
- Children: 1
- Parents: John Phillips (father); Susan Adams (mother)
- Relatives: Freddie Sessler (former-father-in-law); Bijou Phillips (half-sister); Chynna Phillips (half-sister)

Laura Mackenzie Phillips (born November 10, 1959) is an American actress and singer. She is the daughter of seminal folk-rock musician John Phillips of The Mamas and the Papas and his first wife Susan Adams. Her best-known roles include Carol Morrison in the film American Graffiti, Julie Laura Cooper Horvath on the sitcom One Day at a Time, Molly Phillips on Disney Channel's supernatural series So Weird, and Barbara "Barb" Denning in Orange Is the New Black.

== Early life ==
Mackenzie Phillips was born Laura Mackenzie Phillips and she eventually chose to use her middle name professionally. She received her middle name as a tribute to musician Scott MacKenzie who was a friend and bandmate of her father, John Phillips, in The Mamas and the Papas. Her starring role in TV show One Day at a Time (1975 TV series) resulted in popularity of Mackenzie (given name).

Phillips attended Highland Hall Waldorf School in Northridge, California. At age 12, Phillips formed a band with three of her classmates and she was spotted by Fred Roos, a casting agent, during one of their performances. She was given an audition for a role in George Lucas's 1973 film American Graffiti, which she won.

== Career ==
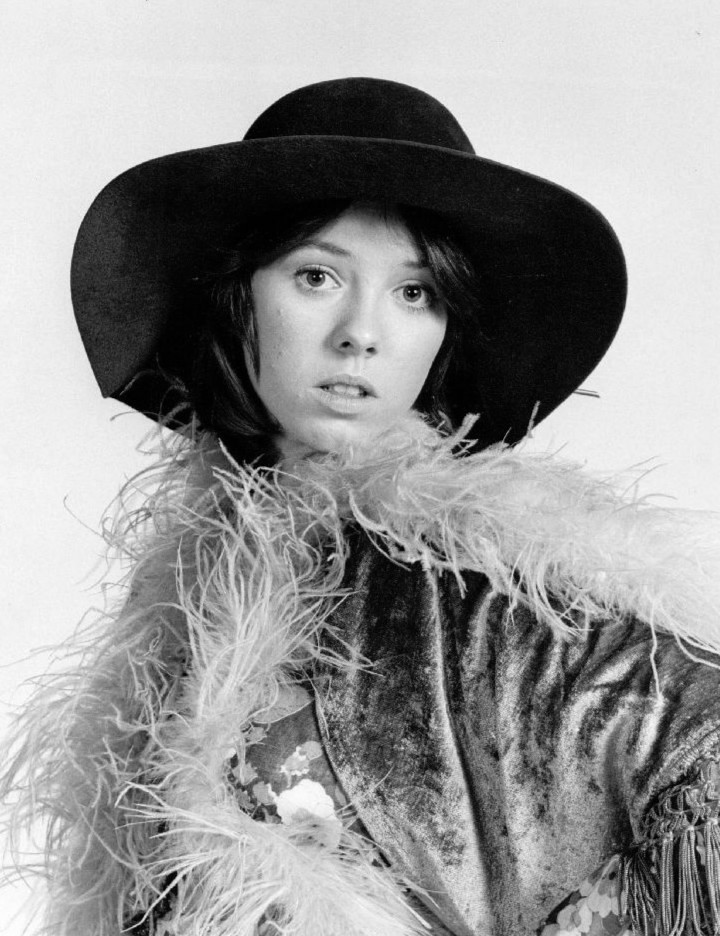
Phillips in 1975

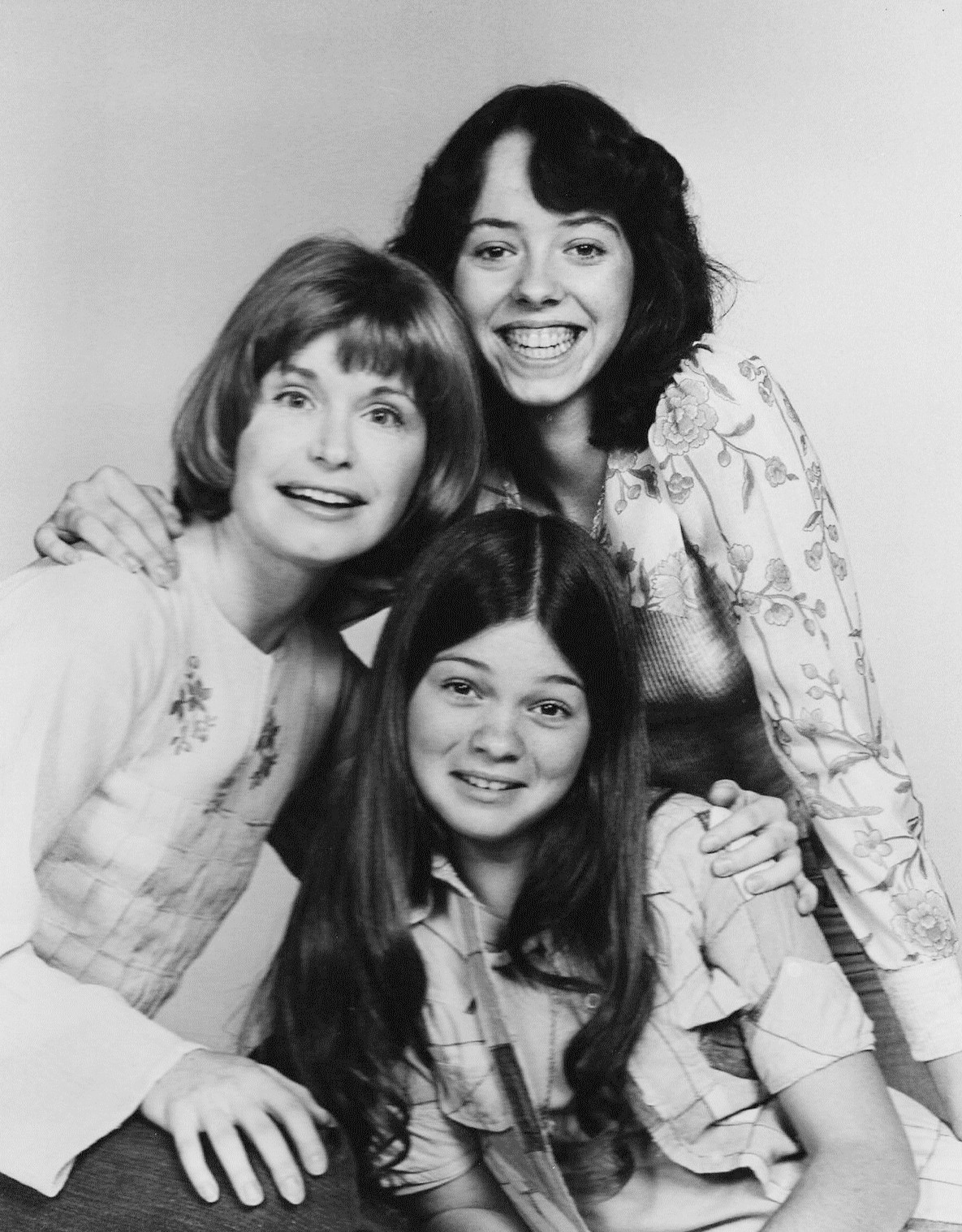
Phillips in 1975, alongside her One Day at a Time co-stars Bonnie Franklin and Valerie Bertinelli

Phillips was 12 years old during the filming of American Graffiti and 13 when the movie was released. She was cast as Carol Morrison, a young girl accidentally picked up by hot rodding teenager John Milner (Paul Le Mat). Because of California state law, producer Gary Kurtz became Phillips' legal guardian for the duration of the filming.

Phillips gained stardom in the 1970s playing teenager Julie Cooper (when the character got married, her married name was Horvath) on the long-running television show One Day at a Time, for which she earned $50,000 a week. During the show's third season in 1977, Phillips was arrested for disorderly conduct. Because of her drug and alcohol abuse, Phillips began arriving late and was even incoherent for rehearsals. The producers ordered her to take a six-week break to overcome her addiction but were ultimately forced to fire her in 1980.

After two near-fatal overdoses, Phillips entered Fair Oaks Hospital voluntarily for treatment. In 1981, the producers of One Day at a Time invited her back to the show. However, in 1982, Phillips relapsed into cocaine use and the following year, she collapsed on the show's set. After refusing to take a drug test, she was fired permanently, and her character written out of the series. In 1992, Philips entered a drug rehab program for nine months. From the mid-1980s to the early 1990s, Phillips performed as a singer and toured with a re-formed version of her father John Phillips's band The Mamas & the Papas, known as The New Mamas and The Papas.

In 1999, Phillips co-starred with Cara DeLizia in the Disney Channel series So Weird, playing fictional rock star Molly Phillips. She sang original songs written by show producers Jon Cooksey and Ann Marie Montade. In 2002, she appeared in the Disney Channel original movie Double Teamed. Phillips guest-starred on episodes of ER, Without a Trace, 7th Heaven, Cold Case and Beverly Hills, 90210.

Phillips won an Honorary Best Actress award on March 20, 2011, at the closing night awards gala of the Female Eye Film Festival in Toronto for her performance as Sharon in the 2010 independent film Peach Plum Pear. While in Toronto, she was interviewed on Canada AM, ET Canada, and The Marilyn Denis Show. In 2016, Phillips began working at the Breathe Life Healing Center in West Hollywood, California as a drug rehab counselor. In 2017, Phillips appeared in an episode of the rebooted One Day at a Time as Pam Valentine, a counselor. She reprised the role in 2019 in two episodes of the third season. In 2018, Phillips appeared as Barbara Denning in episodes of the Netflix original series Orange Is the New Black.

== Personal life ==
Phillips has been married three times: first to rock group manager Jeffrey Sessler, son of Freddie Sessler (from 1979 to 1981); then to rock guitarist Shane Fontayne (from 1986 to 2000); and then to Keith Levenson in 2005 (they subsequently divorced). She has one child, son Shane Barakan (b. 1987), a musician. In an interview in March 2022, she stated that she has dated both men and women.

=== Substance abuse and arrest ===
Phillips has struggled with drug abuse for much of her life. On August 27, 2008, she was arrested by the Los Angeles Airport Police on charges of possession of cocaine and heroin, discovered after she went through airport security screening. On October 31, 2008, she pleaded guilty to one felony count of cocaine possession and was sentenced to a drug rehabilitation program. Phillips's drug case was dismissed after she successfully completed a drug diversion program. She appeared on the third season of Celebrity Rehab, which aired in January and February 2010. She later discussed her recovery on the March 17, 2010, episode of The View.

=== Allegations of abuse by biological father ===
In September 2009, Phillips's memoir High on Arrival was released, after which she appeared on The Oprah Winfrey Show for an hour-long interview. She told Oprah Winfrey that she first tried cocaine when she was 11 years old and that her father had given her drugs and injected her with cocaine. During the interview, Phillips read excerpts from her book. She said that at the age of 19, on the night before her first wedding in 1979, "I woke up that night from a blackout to find myself having sex with my own father", and that when she confronted her father months later, asking why he had raped her, her father simply replied: "Raped you? Don't you mean we made love?" Phillips told Winfrey of having a "consensual" sexual relationship with her father, describing her participation as "sort of Stockholm syndrome, where you begin to love your captor". However, she has also described the initial incident as a rape and has said: "No matter what kind of incest, it is an abuse of power ... a betrayal of trust." The alleged abuse ended after Phillips conceived a child and, worried about its parentage, subsequently had an abortion, for which her father paid.

Geneviève Waïte, John Phillips's third wife, denied the allegations, saying they were inconsistent with his character. Michelle Phillips, John's second wife, also stated that she had "every reason to believe [Mackenzie's account is] untrue". However, Chynna Phillips, Mackenzie Phillips's half-sister and Michelle Phillips's daughter, stated that she believed Phillips's claims and that Phillips first told her about the relationship during a phone conversation in 1997, approximately 11 years after the supposed relationship had ended. Jessica Woods, daughter of the Mamas and the Papas member Denny Doherty, said that her father had told her that he knew "the awful truth" and that he was "horrified at what John had done".

== Filmography ==
Film
Year	Title	Role	Notes
1973	American Graffiti	Carol Morrison	
1975	Rafferty and the Gold Dust Twins	Rita "Frisbee" Sykes	
1979	More American Graffiti	Carol "Rainbow" Morrison	
1982	Love Child	J.J.	
1998	True Friends	Connie	
1999	When	Catherine Brown	
2002	Double Teamed	Mary Burge	
2005	The Jacket	Nurse Harding	
2011	Hercules Saves Christmas	Helen Dunn	Alternate title: Santa's Dog
2011	Peach Plum Pear	Sharon	
2014	Suburban Gothic	Mrs. Richards	
2014	Blackout	Sarah	Short film
2014	North Blvd	Linda	
2015	Girl on the Edge	Deborah Green	
2016	Sacred Journeys	Tiff	Short film
2018	North Blvd	Linda	

Television
Year	Title	Role	Notes
1973	Go Ask Alice	Doris	Television film
1974	Movin' On	Chessie	Episode: "Roadblock"
1975	Miles to Go Before I Sleep	Robin Williams	Television film
1975	Baretta	Mindy	Episode: "On the Road"
1975	The Mary Tyler Moore Show	Francie	Episode: "Mary's Delinquent"
1975–1983	One Day at a Time	Julie Mora Cooper Horvath	Main cast; 123 episodes
1976	The Jacksons	Herself	Episode: "Mackenzie Phillips"
1976	Eleanor and Franklin	Young Eleanor Roosevelt	Television film
1976–1979	Child World	Herself	TV commercials
1978	The Love Boat	Allison Scott	Episode: "The Big Deal"
1979	Fast Friends	Susan	Television film
1979	The Incredible Hulk	Lisa Swan	Episode: "Metamorphosis"
1980	The Silent Lovers	Lillian Gish	Television film
1982	The Love Boat	Rachel Johnson	Episode: "Gopher's Roommate"
1985	Murder, She Wrote	Carol Needom	Episode: "Murder in the Afternoon"
1986	Kate's Secret	Deyna	Television film
1994	Beverly Hills, 90210	Counselor Ellen Marks	Episode: "Intervention"
1995	Melrose Place	Maureen Dodd	2 episodes
1996	Guiding Light	Rachel Sullivan	4 episodes
1996	NYPD Blue	Mary Donaldson	Episode: "Sorry, Wong Suspect"
1997	Caroline in the City	Donna Spadaro	Episode: "Caroline and the Singer"
1997	Walker, Texas Ranger	Ellen Simms	2 episodes
1998	Chicago Hope	Valerie Boyd	Episode: "Risky Business"
1998	Viper	Heidi Rosen	Episode: "The Full Frankie"
1999–2001	So Weird	Molly Phillips	Main cast; 63 episodes
2000	The Outer Limits	Boo Weston	Episode: "Down to Earth"
2001	Kate Brasher	Tracy Del Rey	Episode: "Tracy"
2001	Crossing Jordan	Elaine Stahler	Episode "The Dawn of a New Day"
2002	Double Teamed	Mary Burge	Television film
2002	ER	Leslie Miller	Episode "Damage Is Done"
2003	The Division	Carol Johnson	Episode: "Thus with a Kiss I Die"
2004	Without a Trace	Theresa Caldwell	Episode: "Lost and Found"
2004	NYPD Blue	Lorraine Stuval	Episode: "Fish Out of Water"
2004	7th Heaven	Allison Davies	Episode: "Why Not Me?"
2007	Cold Case	Sheila Swett	Episode: "That Woman"
2009	Radio Needles	Tonya Taylor	Television film
2012	Interns: The Web Series	CEO	Episode: "Accepted"
2012	Criminal Minds	Ellen Russell	Episode: "The Pact"
2012	She Made Them Do It	Jamie Long	Television film
2014	Phineas and Ferb	Female Judge / Jump Instructor (voice)	Episode: "Act Your Age"
2014	The Daily Helpline	Herself Co-Hostes	Episode: "Mackenzie Phillips"
2015	Hot in Cleveland	Kaylin	Episode: "About a Joy"
2016–2018	Milo Murphy's Law	Principal Elizabeth Milder (voice)	7 episodes
2017	Battle of the Network Stars	Herself	Episode: "TV Moms & Dads vs. TV Kids"
2017–2020	One Day at a Time	Pam Valentine	9 episodes
2018	Orange Is the New Black	Barbara "Barb" Denning	6 episodes

Stage
Year	Title	Role	Notes
1994–1998	Grease	Betty Rizzo	Broadway touring revival
1999	The Vagina Monologues	Performer	Westside Theatre
2001–2002	A Delicate Balance	Julia	Ford Theatre
2002	Same Time, Next Year	Doris	Shubert Theater
2004–2005	How I Learned to Drive	L'il Bit	Alex Theatre
2005–2007	Annie	Lily St. Regis	Touring revival

== Bibliography ==
- High on Arrival (2009)
- Hopeful Healing: Essays on Managing Recovery and Surviving Addiction (2017)

== Awards and nominations ==
Year	Award	Category	Nominated work	Result
2001	Young Artist Awards	Best Ensemble in a TV Series (Drama or Comedy) (shared with cast)	So Weird	Nominated
2005	TV Land Awards	Favorite Singing Siblings (Shared with: Valerie Bertinelli)	One Day at a Time	Nominated
2012	LA Femme International Film Festival	Meritorious Achievement Award		Won
2017	Behind the Voice Actors Awards	Best Vocal Ensemble in a New Television Series (Shared with cast)	Milo Murphy's Law	Nominated
