= Tania Saulnier =

Canadian actress (born 1982)

- Occupation: Actress
- Years active: 1998–2010

Tania Saulnier is a Canadian former actress, perhaps best known for her role in the film Slither. Saulnier was born in Vancouver, British Columbia, Canada.

Once a competitive dancer and motor-sport enthusiast, her first notable acting role came in 1998 with a small part as Marcey Bennett, in one episode of Cold Squad. From there she moved on to various projects, one of which was playing Taylor Langford in the short-lived Nickelodeon series Caitlin's Way, for which she was nominated for a 2001 Leo Award as Best Performance in a Youth or Children's Program or Series. She went on to act in small roles on various television shows, such as Smallville, and in the Supernatural episode "Scarecrow". This was followed by her supporting role in James Gunn's horror film Slither as Kylie Strutemyer. Saulnier has appeared in several films, including The Invisible and In the Name of the King: A Dungeon Siege Tale.

== Filmography ==
Film
Year	Title	Role	Notes
1999	Limp	Brooklyn	
2002	Cheats	Hot Girl #2	
2006	She's the Man	Kissing Girl (uncredited)	
2006	Slither	Kylie Strutemyer	
2006	The Wicker Man	Attendant #1	
2007	In the Name of the King	Talwyn	
2007	The Invisible	Suzie	
2008	Elegy	George's Girlfriend	
2009	Conrad the Wise	Starlette	Short film
2010	Percy Jackson & the Olympians: The Lightning Thief	Aphrodite Girl	

Television
Year	Title	Role	Notes
1998	Cold Squad		Episode: "Marcey Bennett"
1999	The Darklings	Erica	TV movie
1999	Poltergeist: The Legacy	Young Vicky	Episode: "Gaslight"
2000	Ratz	Blair	TV movie
2000–2002	Caitlin's Way	Taylor Langford	13 episodes
2001	Smallville	Jenna Barnum	Episode: "Cool"
2001	The Sausage Factory	Pam	Episode: "Gilby's Millions"
2002	Special Unit 2	Urban Princess	Episode: "The Love"
2003	Ann Rule Presents: The Stranger Beside Me	Sorority Girl	TV movie
2005	Found	Julia / Catherine	TV movie
2006	Supernatural	Emily Jorgeson	Episode: "Scarecrow"
2010	Lying to Be Perfect	Angie	TV movie

== Awards and nominations ==
Year	Award	Category	Title of work	Result	Ref.
2001	Leo Award	Best Performance in a Children's or Youth Program or Series	Caitlin's Way (for episode #2.18: "Little Sister")	Nominated	
