= Sitting Ducks (TV series) =

2001 Canadian-American animated children's television series

- Promotional poster
- Genre: Children's television series; Comedy; Slapstick
- Created by: Michael Bedard (lithography)
- Developed by: Sitting Ducks Productions
- Directed by: Walt Kubiak
- Creative directors: Terry Shakespeare (season 1); David Molina (season 1); Gary Selvaggio (season 2)
- Voices of: Ian James Corlett; Dave "Squatch" Ward
- Theme music composer: Kick Production Ltd.
- Composers: Kick Production Ltd. (season 1); Charlie Brissette ("Running Duck"/"Duck Naked" rereleases; season 2)
- Countries of origin: United States; Canada
- Original language: English
- No. of seasons: 2
- No. of episodes: 26 (52 segments)

Production
- Executive producers: Michael Bedard; Elizabeth Daro; Loredana Cunti (season 1)
- Producer: Eliot Daro
- Editors: Billy Jones (season 1); Steven Kingsbury (season 2)
- Running time: 22 minutes (11 minutes per segment)
- Production companies: The Krislin Company; Creative Capers Entertainment; Krislin/Elliot Digital; Sitting Ducks Productions; Universal Pictures Visual Programming

Original release
- Network: Cartoon Network
- Release: September 13, 2001 – July 5, 2003

Sitting Ducks is a children's television series based on the 1977 "Sitting Ducks" lithograph and the 1998 children's book of the same name, created by the poster artist Michael Bedard. The series first premiered internationally before debuting in the United States on Cartoon Network; reruns also aired on Qubo from 2007 until 2012.

The show lasted for two seasons each comprising thirteen episodes, with the last episode shown on July 5, 2003.

== Synopsis ==
Sitting Ducks stars Bill, a duck who likes to hang out with his socially outcast best friend Aldo, the alligator. The duration of the show revolves around the daily life of the two, while also having the two seek to overcome the stigma between duck and gator-kind in their world and bring forth tolerance between the two species. The citizens of Ducktown are taught to fear and treat the alligators as monsters, while the alligators of Swampwood are taught to eat ducks, and ducks only; both of these ideas are an integral part of the culture of both respective towns.

Bill, a civilized, rational duck, seeks leisure in planes (due in part to his passion for flying and the art behind it) and painting, but more often than not he's constantly pestered by the likes of Ed, Oly, and Waddle, his gluttonous next-door neighbors. The brothers always mooch off of Bill and friends and use them for their own advantages; in essence, they are greedy, self-centered freeloaders. Bill also shares his apartment building with Fred, a melancholy immigrant penguin from the region of Antarctica.

Aldo, on the other hand, resides in Swampwood and is surrounded with temptations to consume ducks. He consistently overcomes this instinct (though, on rare occasions, he nearly eats ducks because his urges sometimes get the better of him), while also encountering resistance from fellow alligators who advise him to end his interspecies friendship with Bill; Aldo remains unwavering in his dedication to their relationship.

Secondary characters such as Bev and Cecil provide support for the main characters in the show and also drive the narrative; Bev is the owner of the characters' main hangout spot, the Decoy Café, and has the second closest friendship with Aldo. Cecil is the "only dentist in a toothless town" while also acting as scientist and an inventor. Raoul is a Spanish crow who delivers snarky commentary on Bill and makes fun of his ambitions; he often looks down on ducks because while they can't fly, crows can.

== Characters ==
- Bill (voiced by Ian James Corlett) - an anthropomorphic diminutive duck who waddles to a different beat, a very kind-hearted, good-natured fellow who is always there when needed. One of his dreams is to fly. With the help of his friend Dr. Cecil, he tries again and again to fly, and eventually is told that the reason he cannot is because ducks became too terrestrial. Bill's main appearance difference, apart from his smallness, is his bow tie (usually red) which he changes every year at the Ducktown Picnic. Bill lives in an apartment with his pet parrot, Jerry. He has been called a "gator lover" for his rare efforts to turn alligators into allies of Ducktown.
- Aldo (voiced by Dave Ward) - a lumbering but kind-hearted alligator from the town of Swampwood. He is Bill's best friend, though he often receives grief from his fellow gators on being a "duck lover". He has a blind uncle named Artie and a younger cousin named Andy. He was once the cook at the bowling ball factory, but transferred to the assembly line after he befriended Bill, as he did not want to cook any more ducks. He also fights his carnivorous instincts so he will not eat ducks.
- Bev (voiced by Kathleen Barr) – Owner of the Decoy Cafe, where many ducks go to eat. She is a sweet duck who also has an alias, Madam Bevousky, as whom she offers fortune telling services to the residents of Ducktown. She is also the focus of Bill's romantic interests.
- Ed (voiced by Louis Chirillo), Oly (voiced by Phil Hayes), and Waddle (voiced by Jay Brazeau) - three brothers and friends of Bill who live next door to him. These three goofy and lazy freeloaders tend to scheme their way into things and are usually the ones behind some plot or a practical joke, from which they always try to distance themselves when things go awry. Ed wears a tropical shirt and speaks with a New York accent. Oly wears a green beret, has big, soft feathers (as seen in "Fowl Weather Feathers") and speaks with a "beatnik" accent. Waddle is the shortest, fattest, youngest and has a childlike voice.
- Dr. Cecil (voiced by Ian James Corlett) - Ducktown's only dentist and an inventor. Cecil speaks in a British accent and is always there to offer advice to Bill or the others. Naturally, Aldo is typically his only customer, being the only person in town who actually has teeth. He also provides beak adjustments for the ducks.
- Claire - Cecil's wife. She has an appreciation for opera. According to a flyer of the show that was handed out during production, Claire owns a candy shop called the "Jawbreaker Emporium". However, this location was never seen in the show.
- Fred (voiced by Phil Hayes) - a melancholic, but sometimes nervously hyper penguin, who migrated from Antarctica to Ducktown, in which he has citizenship. He's somewhat of a loner most of the time, always seen surrounding himself with bags of ice or air conditioning to remain comfortable in the intolerable (to him) heat. He has a duck girlfriend, Dot Cable, and a stylish cousin, Gelata.
- Raoul (voiced by Michael Benyaer) - a Spanish-accented crow who tends to be the freeloading troublemaker in Ducktown, and likes trading insults with Bill and mocking Bill's attempts to fly.
- Drill Sergeant Duck (voiced by Cathy Weseluck) - a tough police duck who makes it hard for Aldo to come into Ducktown, as she also is the leader of the Duck Defense League, an anti-gator organization, and the Ducktown Scooter Shop and Driver Station.
- Other characters that have appeared in the show have been voiced by Dale Wilson, Brian Dobson, Sylvia Zaradic, Chantal Strand, Chiara Zanni, Pauline Newstone, Paul Dobson, Lee Tockar, Garry Chalk, and Scott McNeil.

== Episodes ==
=== Series overview ===
Season	Episodes	Originally released	
Season	Episodes	First released	Last released
1	13	September 13, 2001	March 10, 2002
2	13	April 12, 2003	July 5, 2003

=== Season 1 (2001–02) ===
No. overall	No. in season	Title	Written by	Original release date	Prod. code
1a	1a	"Running Ducks"	S : Michael Bedard; T : Paul Rugg & Danielle Mentzer	September 13, 2001	0001a
After watching the week’s "Running Duck" episode, Bill ventures out into the night and in parallels to the show, he then gets chased by a hungry Aldo. After confronting him in an alleyway, he and Aldo eventually warm up to each other after Bill takes him to Cecil, the town dentist. In the end, Bill and Aldo become friends and forgive each other.
1b	1b	"Duck Naked"	Danielle Mentzer	September 13, 2001	0001b
Bill takes a shower, and in a faux-plucked, embarrassed appearance, experiences molting, and grows a strong dislike for it. After being given directions to the Decoy Café by Ed, he, with Aldo accompanying, then gets “cured” two times, each with devastating effects, the last one turning him green.
2a	2a	"Ducks for Hire"	Thomas Hart	September 20, 2001	0002a
After dropping a refrigerator on someone's scooter, Ed, Oly, and Waddle must find a job to pay to get it fixed. After getting fired from Bev's Cafe and several other jobs, Bill asks them to help paint a billboard, but however it goes terribly wrong.
2b	2b	"Hic Hic Hooray"	S : John Hoberg; T : Richard Albrecht & Casey Keller	September 20, 2001	0002b
Aldo volunteers to be the fifth member in Bill's Squaddo game, but Bill tries to stop him because he hasn't told his family his best friend is an alligator. After eating fried tadpole buttocks, Aldo also gets a case of the giccups (gator hiccups), so Bill and some of their friends try to make the giccups go away.
3a	3a	"Peeking Duck"	Richard Albrecht and Casey Keller	September 27, 2001	0003a
While using his new telescope, Bill spots Aldo in Cecil and Claire's apartment. Ed, Oly, and Waddle tell him that Aldo has eaten Cecil and Claire, so they go to the apartment, finding that Aldo is only baby-sitting their pet lizard Lizzie for the weekend.
3b	3b	"Fred's Meltdown"	S : Michael Bedard; T : Sean Roche	September 27, 2001	0003b
Fred the penguin's air-conditioners cause a town power outage thanks to an electrical overload, so every duck refuses to let him into the pond to cool off. Bill and Fred go to Swampwood (which hasn't been affected by the power failure) to collect ice, causing them to get attacked by alligators. Fred saves Bill, and then the two treat Ducktown to an ice cream feast.
4a	4a	"Mind Over Mallard"	Don Gillies	October 4, 2001	0004a
Bill dreams about flying again, only to wake up from it. Disappointed, he calls Cecil and successfully convinces him to help him fly. Cecil and Bill make numerous attempts to fly, while Raoul, in his debut, endlessly mocks them. Bill is implied to have finally gotten hurt and is then sent to the hospital.
4b	4b	"The Fly Who Loved Me"	S : Walt Kubiak; T : Danielle Mentzer	October 4, 2001	0004b
A fly pesters Bill, so he decides to make a late-night trip to the Decoy Café for a milkshake. He finds an alligator pretending to be a duck, with Bev bound and gagged in the kitchen. The fly, aware of the situation, alerts Aldo and takes him to the Decoy, then realizing his friend, Arnold the alligator, is about to eat Bev and Bill. Aldo manages to save the two by lying to Arnold about a change in the bowling ball factory's schedule.
5a	5a	"Feeding Frenzy"	Michael Merton	October 11, 2001	0005a
Ed, Oly, and Waddle are banned from the Decoy Café because of their unpaid tab, not to mention the trio is broke. Because of this, Waddle creates waffles from pickled plankton, nematodes, fermented pond scum, and an old sock, and much to Ed and Oly's delight, they're delicious. The waffles become popular with the entire town, depriving Bev of her customers. Bill finds out that the waffles cause the feathers of the consumer to come off, ending in Ed, Oly, and Waddle seeking refuge in Bev's café.
5b	5b	"Bev's Big Day"	Danielle Mentzer, Jill Gorey, Barbara Herndon, and Christine Balling	October 11, 2001	0005b
Everybody in the cafe forgets about Bev's birthday, and in response, she furiously shuts it down for the rest of the day. Desperate to make up, Bill, Aldo, Ed, Oly, and Waddle give her cake and flowers to undesired effects. In their final attempt, they all tell the stories of how they first met Bev, and after having her heart touched, she finally reopens the cafe and gives everyone milkshakes for free.
6a	6a	"Born to Be Wild"	S : Michael Bedard; T : Richard Liebmann-Smith	October 18, 2001	0006a
A scooter crash renders Waddle in a primitive state, and eventually he starts acting like an ancestral wild duck. After Ed and Oly watch him, they end up finding him on the top of a billboard, thus Bill is tasked with the objective of retrieving Waddle.
6b	6b	"Bill Hatches an Egg"	Don Gillies	October 18, 2001	0006b
A game of frisbee catch leads to Bill finding an egg in the park, which incites him to believe that it's an abandoned duck egg. After he takes it home, concerns about the egg (its taste in media, whether it's a duck egg or not) causes Aldo and Bill to keep challenging each other, but then when they lose the egg in a chase, they are both surprised to find out that it's a turtle egg.
7a	7a	"Hey... Bill's on the News"	Sean Roche	October 25, 2001	0007a
Bill has to go out and buy a satellite dish in order to watch a special on The Flight Channel.
7b	7b	"Got Milk?"	Barbara Herndon and Jill Gorey	October 25, 2001	0007b
The cows have gone on strike, so the milk supply for the town is cut off. Bill is sent in to persuade them to start supplying again, finding out they aren’t comfortable enough for the job.
8a	8a	"License to Scoot"	Danielle Mentzer	November 1, 2001	0008a
Fred likes Dottie and with Bill's help, nervously asks her out, but has to learn about using Bill’s scooter to get there. It turns out that penguins are not the best at scooter-driving.
8b	8b	"The Old Duck and the Sea"	Richard Albrecht and Casey Keller	November 1, 2001	0008b
After Aldo wins another bowling trophy, Bill realizes that he has never won a trophy himself, so he goes out to the city pond to fish for a rare marine animal, the Bug-Eyed Bass.
9a	9a	"Pest of a Guest"	Ken Koonce and David Weimers	February 10, 2002	0009a
After Bill hurts Raoul's foot in the window, he has to take care of him. However Raoul begins to take advantage of Bill even though his foot was never really injured, just so he can get royal treatment he thinks he deserves.
9b	9b	"Getting Away from It All"	S : Michael Bedard; T : Richard Albrecht & Casey Keller	February 10, 2002	0009b
Bill decides he needs some time to himself only to find Ed, Waddle and Oly in his house watching TV. So he takes a boat to a private island only to have his boat float away. While on the island, he makes a new friend in a chicken and is almost eaten by alligators. When Ed, Oly, and Waddle notice Bill is missing, they set off to rescue him.
10a	10a	"Midnight Snack"	Don Gillies	February 17, 2002	0010a
When Bill is almost eaten by a sleepwalking Aldo, he tries to get Aldo to eat duck food but to no avail. So Bill takes him to Cecil which doesn't work and then tries a psychiatrist which also fails. In the end they find out that they both like to eat fish.
10b	10b	"The Visitor"	S : Michael Bedard; T : Richard Albrecht & Casey Keller	February 17, 2002	0010b
An alien duck named Zug visits Ducktown with a remote that can control people. Finding it funny at first, their opinion changes when Aldo is frozen, Ed, Oly and Waddle are put into a video game they are playing, and Bill gets shrunk. In the end Zug's parents arrive and he gets grounded.
11a	11a	"Ducks on Ice"	Don Gillies	February 24, 2002	0011a
To celebrate Penguin Day, Bill and his friends go down to central pond. However a fierce wind blows them over to the alligators' side of the pond where they have to agree to play the alligators' kids at a game of Ice Pucky or be eaten.
11b	11b	"Where's Aldo?"	Richard Liebmann-Smith	February 24, 2002	0011b
After Bill and Aldo have an argument over Aldo's clumsiness, Aldo leaves. Bill regrets the fight so he, Ed, Oly and Waddle head off to Swampwood to try to make up.
12a	12a	"Great White Hype"	S : Michael Bedard; T : Ken Koonce & Dave Weimers	March 3, 2002	0012a
A boxing match between Crazy Bob the duck and an alligator known as the Green Death! has come to town and everyone is taking bets. However Bill finds out what is going on behind the match and then the tables turn.
12b	12b	"Waddle's Spud Bud"	Don Gillies	March 3, 2002	0012b
After Aldo performs a magic trick on Bill turning him into a potato, Waddle babysits the potato he believes to be Bill for the day. In the end he realizes that he took the illusion a little too seriously.
13a	13a	"Denture Adventure"	Barbara Herndon and Jill Gorey	March 10, 2002	0013a
Cecil shows Bill his new invention, ducky dentures, but says that the duck public isn't ready for the power of having teeth. Bill then takes the denture from Cecil's office and ends up having a dream that all the ducks have teeth and want to attack him.
13b	13b	"All In a Day's Work"	Tom Hart	March 10, 2002	0013b
Bill asks Aldo if he wants to go to a concert but Aldo refuses because he is too tired from work. When Bill asks what Aldo does for a job, Aldo refuses to tell him because his job involves cooking ducks. So Bill goes to Aldo's factory and is almost eaten by other alligators. Aldo finds Bill and claims that Bill is his lunch. In the end Aldo decides he is going to quit his job.

=== Season 2 (2003) ===
No. overall	No. in season	Title	Written by	Original release date	Prod. code
14a	1a	"Holding Pen 13"	James Magon	April 12, 2003	5427a
A contest that Ed, Oly, and Waddle supposedly "win" leads into the three getting kidnapped and transported to Colonel Snappy's, a restaurant in Swampwood. After learning of their presence via a commercial on the gator channel, Aldo and Bill set out to free them, and every other duck trapped within the gates.
14b	1b	"Daredevil Ducks"	Danielle Mentzer	April 12, 2003	5427b
A fight over the remote leads to Ed, Oly, and Waddle's television breaking, and in the middle of their program, "Daredevil Ducks." After travelling to Bill's apartment to finish the show, they call into the show after seeing that they can win a TV after rubbing an alligator's belly. After a continuous series of failed attempts, they finally win the TV after Bill rubs Aldo's belly, indirectly making him fall asleep.
15a	2a	"Aldo the Duck"	Vinny Montello	April 19, 2003	5428a
After Aldo continuously subdues his urges to eat duck, it overcomes him, and thus he goes to Cecil's office for help. As a solution, he gives Aldo duck hormones that instead make him crave duck food. Aldo eventually overdoses on the hormones, which leads to the point where he starts looking and acting like a duck.
15b	2b	"Chasing Andy"	Sindy McKay	April 19, 2003	5428b
Bill meets Andy, Aldo's baby cousin, and is given babysitter duties after Aldo leaves for a bowling championship. While preparing him a sandwich, Ed, Oly, and Waddle walk in and mess with him; Waddle gets bitten which causes Andy to develop a lasting craving for duck, which sends him and the ducks on a wild chase.
16a	3a	"Feet of Fortune"	Larry Swerdlove	April 26, 2003	5429a
Learning of Madame Bevousky's fortune telling services, Aldo and Bill get their feet read, but after Bev makes a shocking discovery on Bill's foot, she reveals to him that he is ridden with bad luck. After setting foot into the outside world, Bill goes through a series of calamities, which gets to the point of him not trusting his very own best friend, until it turns out that Bev's chart was upside down, and everything else was mere coincidence.
16b	3b	"The Great Scooter Race"	Ford Riley, Tedd Anasti, and Patsy Cameron	April 26, 2003	5429b
In a bet to win free milkshakes, Ed and Bev take part in the Ducktown 50, a scooter race that spans the entirety of Ducktown and the surrounding country. Despite her being inept at riding a scooter at first, Bev then gains her skills, and during the race, Ed's team resorts to cheating and plants booby traps that are supposed to set Bev up for failure.
17a	4a	"O'Brother What Art Thou"	Michael Dobkins	May 3, 2003	5430a
Aldo is a member of a secret club, The Brothers of The Snapping Snout, and Bill, eager to join a club for the first time ever, tags along with Aldo (in an alligator costume). The other members warm up to him, and when Bill is initiated into the club, Bill makes the mistake of revealing his true identity, causing Aldo to get barred from entering the club ever again.
17b	4b	"Urban Legend"	Sib Ventress	May 3, 2003	5430b
Aldo dreams about the urban legend Quack the Ripper, a duck known as the "web-footed scourge of gatordom", with sharp teeth who feasts on alligators. After telling Bill and co. about the legend, Ed, Oly, and Waddle mock Aldo relentlessly, who then conjure up a prank to pull on the entirety of Swampwood. After dressing Waddle up like Quack the Ripper, and causing mass hysteria, the alligators then kidnap him and force Aldo to eat him, until the real Quack the Ripper scares off the alligators.
18a	5a	"Fred's Fever"	Doug Molitor	May 10, 2003	5431a
On the day of the Ducktown citizenship test and initiation, Fred develops a fever that is known to be harmful to penguins. While Bill and Aldo offer assistance, it doesn't prove to be of much help, and Fred becomes delirious with the fever. it gets to the point to where he crashes the initiation, and before every duck ostracizes him from the town, Fred speaks up about how passionate he is to become a citizen, and becomes initiated.
18b	5b	"You're Grounded"	Vinny Montello	May 10, 2003	5431b
Raoul's reckless flying causes him to get in an accident, and consequently gets his flying license revoked, much to the excitement and mockery of Bill. Later, Bev, Bill, and Aldo start to notice that Raoul's become a "broken bird", and Bill comes to realize that he truly misses Raoul's mischief. Because of this, Aldo and Bill set up flying lessons for Raoul so he can get his license back.
19a	6a	"The Gator in the Mask"	Tedd Anasti and Patsy Cameron	May 17, 2003	5432a
The annual Ducktown picnic is in town, historic for the fact that something goes wrong every time it happens. While Aldo wants to attend, he has to wear a duck mask that makes the fellow ducks none the wiser. Unbeknownst to the attendees, a duo of alligators plan on sabatoging the picnic so they can make the ducks into food, which Aldo defends the ducks from (which involves a lawnmower). When everyone believes the picnic will finally end normally, the lawnmover shreds everything in its path and ruins the picnic.
19b	6b	"Lotta Gelata"	S : Michael Bedard; T : Sindy McKay & Vinny Montello	May 17, 2003	5432b
Fred's favorite cousin, Gelata, visits town, and much to her surprise, all the male ducks she meets fall in love with her. All the time she spends in Ducktown is with the male crowd, much to Fred's embarrassment. Eventually, after Ed, Oly, Bill, and Waddle spend time with her in Fred's apartment, they freeze solid, until Bev gives the ducks steaming kisses that melt the ice.
20a	7a	"Feather Island"	James Magon	May 24, 2003	5433a
Drill Sargeant Duck imposes a ban on alligators spending time in Ducktown, to the dismay of Bill and Aldo. After finding a treasure map in the Decoy's storage room, they decide to search for the treasure, while being unwantingly followed by Ed, Oly, Waddle, and Raoul. The two quarrel over finding the treasure, until they find it and realize that it was a means for them to spend time.
20b	7b	"King of the Bongos"	Danielle Mentzer	May 24, 2003	5433b
After talking Ed, Oly, and Waddle into giving back his stolen KDUCK bumper sticker, Bill attends a concert held by his idol, The King of the Bongos, but when it turns out that he's missing, Bill and Aldo search for him until finding him using sewer grates, fences, and anything else he can think of as an instrument. Bill begins to deduce that The King is crazy, but before leaving, The King invites him and Aldo onto the stage to play a medley of the sounds of Ducktown.
21a	8a	"Fred's Secret"	Carin-Greenberg Baker	May 31, 2003	5434a
The brothers catch a nervous Fred holding a curious object, and after Bill gets kicked out of Fred's apartment after a phone call, they are overcome with questions about Fred's intentions. After catching him with a green glowing substance on him, buying something from an alligator, and a questionable poster on his wall, they deduce that Fred's an alien that's planning to take over Ducktown, and a heated confrontation leads to them discovering the truth: Fred was just building a new satellite so they can watch a game of Ice Puckey on TV.
21b	8b	"Aldo's Uncle Artie"	Tim McKeon	May 31, 2003	5434b
Aldo is going out of town for a bowling tournament and needs someone to look after his blind Uncle Artie. Bill volunteers and he and Artie soon become friends. But when Artie says something about ducks that annoys Bill, Bill tells him he is a duck. Artie then tries to eat Bill, but Aldo comes back in the nick of time and saves Bill.
22a	9a	"Close Encounters of the Green Kind"	Danielle Mentzer, Kate Wharmby, and Michael Maurer	June 7, 2003	5435a
Waddle gets a new girlfriend, Alley, who is an alligator. But when she keeps drooling over him he begins not to trust her. Bill reminds Waddle about how no one trusted Aldo at first when he returned to Ducktown, so Waddle tells Alley he could trust her more if she didn't drool as much.
22b	9b	"Gonna Getcha Gator"	Danielle Mentzer	June 7, 2003	5435b
Drill Sergeant Duck wants to win the Outstanding Sergeant of the Year Award and decides the only way to win it is by catching an alligator. She decides to go after Aldo, so Bill and Aldo must stay one step ahead of her. She ends up arresting Bev, Ed, Fred, Oly, Waddle and Aldo but then loses the award because it is revealed that she arrested Aldo for nothing.
23a	10a	"Nothing but the Truth"	Vinny Montello	June 14, 2003	5436a
Everyone one is tired of Ed's lying so they go to see Cecil to get something which will fix his lying problem. Cecil gives them a spray but Waddle and Oly go around and spray everyone and Bill ends up trying to tell Bev he likes her. Meanwhile, when Ed tells Drill Sargent Duck that two criminals stole his money. Drill Sargent Duck thinks that it's Oly & Waddle.
23b	10b	"Duck and Cover"	Mark Young	June 14, 2003	5436
Bev is almost eaten by an alligator while outback of the cafe. However Bill can't get out there to save her, but two members from the Ducktown Defense League end up coming to her rescue. Subsequently, Bill joins the League and ends up becoming a hero to all ducks in the League, and even Drill Sergeant Duck.
24a	11a	"Iced Duck"	James Magon	June 21, 2003	5437a
A huge block is delivered to the cafe and Bill and Aldo notice that there is an ancient Caveduck stuck in the ice after the ice begins to melt.
24b	11b	"Duck Footed"	Jeff Stockwell	June 21, 2003	5437b
After Bev's dance partner drops out of the Ducktown's annual Shake and Shimmy dance contest (due to a bad molting day), Bill volunteers to step in. They have to compete with Raoul & a female crow named Evette.
25a	12a	"Free as a Bird"	David Ehrman	June 28, 2003	5438a
It turns out that Jerry, Bill's parrot, can talk and has been ordering things with Bill's credit card. Bill gets suspicious when he receives a delivery that he didn't order. After trying and failing to get Jerry to tell him who ordered it, Bill decides to set Jerry free thinking it will give him something to talk about. But when Jerry doesn't return Bill begins to worry.
25b	12b	"Fowl Weather Feathers"	Sarah Weeks	June 28, 2003	5438bb
Ducktown is facing a feather shortage and is in danger from Swampwood. Bill manages to convince Oly to donate some of his feathers, which turn out to be unique. When Oly becomes a celebrity amongst Ducks and Gators alike, Bill and Aldo realize that if Oly is producing all the feathers, the Gators will have no use for the rest of the Ducks and will eat them.
26a	13a	"Duck Lover"	Kate Donahue, Scott Kreamer, and Michael Maurer	July 5, 2003	5439a
When the other gators start making fun of Aldo because his best friend is a duck, he doesn't feel anyone respects him anymore, not even in Ducktown. The alligators even initiate a raid on Ducktown. Aldo reaches out to a llama and says that even though he is friends with a duck, he is proud of his alligator roots.
26b	13b	"Outback Quack"	Richard Liebmann-Smith	July 5, 2003	5439
Bill's old friend, Outback Quack, comes for a visit and begins to brag about his gator he caught. Aldo then pretends to be Bill's captured gator and scares Quack into revealing to everyone that he isn't what he says he is.

== Production ==
In 2000, the pitch pilots for Sitting Ducks and the sister project The Santa Claus Brothers were released. Several test animations produced by Flat Earth Productions and Metrolight Studios were included in the pilot, which consisted of scenes from the Sitting Ducks book, now in animated form. Information about the show's characters and setting were narrated by Bill's pet parrot, Jerry. Some of these animation tests were included on the Duck Cravings, Bill & Friends, and Ducktown Adventures DVDs released outside of the United States.

In 2003, during its American release, the first episode of the show, "Running Ducks/Duck Naked", contained music composed by both Kick and Charlie Brissette. Uploaded on the Internet Archive in 2024, both the original versions of the episodes were found to have contained music completely composed by Kick. The version containing music from Brissette and Kick can be found on the American DVD release of the show. The Kick version was allegedly stated to have been released on Netflix.

In 2006, Elias Entertainment, one of the show's production companies, had released a mobisode of the show titled "Duck-A-Licious", including clips from several episodes from the first and second seasons. All of the clips from the second season were shown in widescreen format. Only three full segments of the show, all from the first season, have been found in widescreen format, alongside short clips and still frames from both seasons.

== Broadcast ==
In 2003, Cartoon Network had picked up the broadcast rights to the show in the United States, and had also aired it in Japan. In other regions, the series aired in Australia on ABC3 and Nickelodeon, in Canada on CBC Television and YTV, in Saudi Arabia on MBC 3, and in the United Kingdom on CITV and Boomerang.

== Home media ==
=== VHS releases ===
Title	Release Date	Additional information
Sitting Ducks: Duck Cravings	February 10, 2004	Also available on DVD format. Episodes: Running Duck, Hic Hic Hooray, Peeking Duck, Midnight Snack, Ducks on Ice, Great White Hype, All In a Day's Work; Includes a bonus episode "Where's Aldo?"
Sitting Ducks: Ducktown Adventures	February 10, 2004	Also available on DVD format. Episodes: Mind Over Mallard, Got Milk?, Duck Naked, Bill Hatches an Egg, Hey... Bill's on the News, Denture Adventure, Waddle's Spud Bud; Includes a bonus episode "The Fly Who Loved Me"
Sitting Ducks: Bill & Friends	February 10, 2004	Also available on DVD format. Episodes: Ducks for Hire, Fred's Meltdown, License to Scoot, Pest of a Guest, Bev's Big Day, Feeding Frenzy, Born to Be Wild; Includes a bonus episode "The Visitor"

=== DVD releases ===
Title	Release Date	Additional information
Sitting Ducks – Season 1: Quack Pack	February 10, 2004	Consists of the "complete first season". However, the DVD contains only one episode from season 1, but featured all of the others from season 2.

== Merchandise ==
Sitting Ducks proved to be a big hit with the European children's show market, and as a result toys, clothing and other merchandise were created.

=== Print ===
The show itself also spawned a few books. Quacking Up is a joke book written by Rick Walton featuring the characters from the TV show, and multiple children's picture books by Danielle Mentzer and Annmarie Harris based on various episodes. The books were released in 2004, roughly one year after the show had ended.

=== Video games ===
In May 2003, Light and Shadow Production picked up the rights from Universal to create games for Sitting Ducks.

==== PlayStation 2/Microsoft Windows ====
Developed by Asobo Studio, the PlayStation 2 and Microsoft Windows versions are 3D action-adventure titles where the player controls Bill and Aldo in different missions based on episodes from the show, with a Multiplayer racing mode also available. An Xbox release was also planned, but was cancelled.

==== PlayStation/Game Boy Advance ====
Developed in-house at Light & Shadow Production with The Code Monkeys assisting the PlayStation version, the PlayStation and Game Boy Advance versions are top-view adventure games where the player can control Bill, Aldo and Fred. It also features a different storyline than the PS2/Windows version. The Game Boy Advance version of the game was generally panned; according to the review aggregator Metacritic, the game received an average score of 34 out of 100, indicating "generally unfavourable reviews. The PlayStation version of the game did not receive enough reviews to earn a critic consensus.
