= So Weird =

Supernatural TV series

- Genre: Dark fantasy; Drama; Mystery; Science fiction; Supernatural fiction; Urban fantasy
- Created by: Tom J. Astle
- Starring: Cara DeLizia; Mackenzie Phillips; Patrick Levis; Erik von Detten; Belinda Metz; Dave Ward; Eric Lively; Alexz Johnson
- Theme music composer: Jon Cooksey
- Opening theme: "In the Darkness" performed by Mackenzie Phillips
- Composer: Ken Williams
- Countries of origin: United States; Canada
- Original language: English
- No. of seasons: 3
- No. of episodes: 65 (list of episodes)

Production
- Executive producers: Henry Winkler; Tom J. Astle; Michelle Davis; Alec Griffith; Ali Marie Matheson (seasons 1–2); Jon Cooksey (seasons 1–2); Larry Sugar (seasons 2–3); John Mandel; Bruce Zimmerman (season 3)
- Camera setup: Film; Single-camera
- Production companies: Sugar Entertainment, Ltd. (seasons 1–2); No Equal Entertainment, Inc. (season 3); Fair Dinkum Productions

Original release
- Network: Disney Channel
- Release: January 18, 1999 – September 28, 2001

So Weird is a television series that aired on Disney Channel from January 18, 1999, to September 28, 2001. The series was shot in Vancouver, British Columbia. In the first two seasons, the series centered on teenage Fiona "Fi" Phillips (Cara DeLizia) who toured with her rock-star mother (Mackenzie Phillips), while encountering paranormal activity along the way. The series was compared to the Fox TV series The X-Files since it took a darker tone than any other Disney Channel show at the time. DeLizia left the series at the start of the third (and final) season, requiring Disney to cast Alexz Johnson as Annie Thelen to replace Fi as the protagonist. Production ceased after 65 episodes.

== Plot ==
=== Season 1 ===
The season begins by introducing the main characters, starting with the protagonist in the series, Fiona "Fi" Phillips, who usually narrates an introduction to the episode's paranormal topic after the main title sequence.

Fi explains that she lives on a tour bus with her well-known rock star mother Molly, who is touring to get back on the rock and roll scene several years after the death of her husband, who was also her bandmate. Fi's brother Jack, Molly's band manager Irene, Irene's husband Ned, and Ned and Irene's son Clu, also live with them on the tour bus, which Ned drives.

Stringing together all of Fi's paranormal encounters is her search to communicate with her father, who died when she was three years old. Fi first had some form of contact with her father in the second episode, titled "Web Sight", where an unknown force sent her internet articles from the future. From alien invasions, time warps and ghosts, Fi faced 13 episodes worth of paranormal activity. Also encountered are a tulpa, a bigfoot, angels, and significantly, a will o' the wisp. The season finale featured Jack becoming possessed by a hyperactive Scottish will o' the wisp, also known as a spunkie. The spunkie told Fi she could save her brother from his control by speaking his one true name, which was only seven letters. Fi found the spirit's one true name, Bricriu, therefore saving her brother. Bricriu had earlier offered to protect Fi from evil spirits who had battled her father, and also to give her contact with the latter, in return for being allowed to possess her brother. Bricriu would reappear in later episodes to help against supposed threats, this may be seen as evidence he was telling the truth, but this is questionable at best, especially since in a season 2 episode he tries to prevent her from talking to a person who knew her father and had some information to give her.

=== Season 2 ===
The second season is darker than the first, playing out over twenty-six episodes compared with the shorter first season, with half this amount. Picking up where last season left off, Molly and the band take time off the tour to record an album. Fi and friend Candy meet a medium who is proven to be a fraud. Ironically, another medium reveals the fake one and assists Fi in contacting her father through music on his old guitar.

Clu is accepted to and goes off to college, reducing his role and introducing his brother Carey. Similar to the previous season, Fi and her gang face another round of legendary creatures including vampires, werewolves, banshees, trolls, sirens and merfolk. In a pivotal episode, Fi discovers that her father also investigated supernatural events and that this was exactly what led to his death. Upon learning this, Fi feels betrayed by her mother, who had been covering up the truth about her father. Additionally, Molly is possessed by Bricriu, the same will o' the wisp who did the same to Jack in season 1. Fi uncovers that will o' the wisps or other dark powers may have been involved in the incident surrounding her father's death, which police had assumed was an accident. In this episode, Bricriu tried to kill a former firefighter who had been present at Rick's car crash and was aware that Fi's dad had been dead, with no apparent cause, before the car crashed. Following this episode, Fi has further contact with her father, as the answer to a troll's question – Faith – was revealed on her computer and on a plethora of cell phones by him. Fi briefly time travels to her childhood, when her father was still alive, in episode 13, titled "Fountain".

The season ends with Fi discovering her father's twin sister received coded messages from him in her sleep. Once decoded, the messages lead Fi to a rooftop where she is attacked by a three-headed being and saved by the spirit of her father. He wanted her to have at least one memory of him, but this allowed for the being's attack. At long last, Fi is able to have a proper farewell with her father. Due to Fi being written out in the next and final season, many fans consider this a fulfilling finale.

=== Season 3 ===
Cara DeLizia, the actress who played Fi, left the show after the second season, but appeared in the first episode of season 3 as a way of transitioning the series to the new lead protagonist for the rest of the season and series, Annie Thelen, who was a friend of the family. There is a significant tonal shift in the series, in which it becomes more lighthearted, contains more singing, and employs a bright color scheme.

The main arc of the story is the mystery behind Annie's spirit animal, a black panther who has protected her since she was a child. Annie insists that people exercise great respect when learning about Native American culture. When the mystery is unveiled, Annie finds out that when she saved a native man in the Amazon, his father returned the favor by shapeshifting into a panther and keeping an eye on Annie in order to help her out when she is in danger.

The returning characters have closure as well. Although Clu was bad at core subjects in high school, he is good at philosophy, and majors in it in college. He tours with the band during vacation times. Carey follows his dream of becoming a guitar player. Annie expresses a desire for him to believe in the paranormal, and he slowly becomes more open-minded towards the paranormal.

== Episodes ==
Season	Episodes	Originally released	
Season	Episodes	First released	Last released
1	13	January 18, 1999	April 26, 1999
2	26	August 27, 1999	August 19, 2000
3	26	August 28, 2000	September 28, 2001

== Main characters ==
Actor/Actress	Character	Seasons		
Actor/Actress	Character	1	2	3
Cara DeLizia	Fiona "Fi" Phillips	Main	Main	Guest
Mackenzie Phillips	Molly Phillips	Main	Main	Main
Patrick Levis	Jack Phillips	Main	Main	Main
Erik von Detten	Clu Bell	Main	Main	Guest
Belinda Metz	Irene Bell	Main	Main	Main
Dave Ward	Ned Bell	Main	Main	Main
Eric Lively	Carey Bell		Main	Main
Alexz Johnson	Annie Thelen			Main

- Cara DeLizia as Fiona "Fi" Phillips (seasons 1–2; guest star, season 3) – Fi maintains a website called So Weird. On this website, she posts her strange experiences with a community that shares her belief in the paranormal. Fi has a vast knowledge and attraction to all things paranormal. In the episodes "Strangeling" and "Banshee," it is hinted that she is part witch on her grandmother's side. In the episode "OOPA", it is shown that she has a psychic connection to an ancient computing device from Atlantis. Fi lost her father in a car accident when she was three years old. In "Strange Geometry", Fi learns that her father was obsessed with the same weird things that she investigates. In "Destiny", the will-o'-the-wisp known as Bricriu says that this may have led to his death. Fi's father's death and its increasingly mysterious circumstances act as a double season-long story arc over seasons 1 and 2. She leaves at the beginning of season 3 to live with her aunt and try to have a "normal life".
- Mackenzie Phillips as Molly Phillips – Fi and Jack's mother, widow of Rick Phillips, and a singer-songwriter. She did the opening narration once, in "Encore", instead of Fi. Molly had a bit of a rocky relationship with her father, apparently starting when she was a rebellious teenager. She wrote a song about him called "The Rock" in "Banshee" to make peace with him. She kept the knowledge that Rick also investigated paranormal activity secret from Fi, saying "he became obsessed with it". She does not share Fi's strong belief in the paranormal, but does support her daughter. Bricriu possessed her in "Destiny" to stop Fi from learning the truth about her father's accident and supposedly to also protect her mother from the spirit world. But the part about protecting Fi is questionable since he goes so far as trapping a pyrophobiac mechanic (who pulled Rick from the car the day of his death) and Fi in a burning building.
- Patrick Levis as Jack Phillips – Although he is Fi's older brother, Jack does not believe in paranormal activity and is the series' most staunch skeptic. Jack is very protective of Fi, and of Molly as well, as seen in "Fathom." He did the opening narration in the episode "Avatar" instead of Fi, and in the episode "Dead Ringer" instead of Annie. Bricriu possessed him in "Will o' the Wisp" to supposedly "protect" Fi from others in the spirit world who did not like her investigations into the paranormal. He met his girlfriend Gabe in "Angel", whom he kept in touch with long-distance, and went to visit in "Fall".
- Erik von Detten as Cluett "Clu" Bell (seasons 1–2; guest star, season 3) – Carey's younger brother, Ned and Irene's son, Clu was more accepting of Fi's paranormal theories, and she often took him along when investigating. He got into college in "Mutiny". He tends to have a rather goofy, laid-back attitude, like his brother Carey but more so. Still, he can be rather responsible such as when he helped Jack study for his driver's license in "Rebecca".
- Belinda Metz as Irene Bell – Molly's band manager. She has a younger sister with whom she never got along after she washed her "ratty stuffed bunny" and made it into a "clean soft bunny", a brother-in-law named Kevin, and a young nephew named Danny, who pulled Clu, Fi, and Jack into his dreams because he wanted help to deal with "the monster" (it turned out he was having nightmares because of his parents' constant fighting, something they resolved to try to fix for Danny's sake) in "Nightmare".
- Dave Ward as Ned Bell – Drives Molly's tour bus, and is Fi's, Clu's, and Jack's home school teacher while on the road (shown in the episodes “Family Reunion”, “Escape”, and “Simplicity”, among others), as well as an unofficially adopted uncle to Fi and Jack and an unofficially adopted big brother to Molly, encouraging her to go out on a date with Tad in the episode “OOPA”, “on behalf of guys everywhere”. In his younger days, he was a roadie for Kiss during their reunion tour (revealed in the episodes “Strangeling”, “Boo”, and “Fountain”). He was possessed by a claustrophobic sea captain in "Mutiny". He went home to visit his childhood friend Sam, who was being haunted by a vision of their friend Pete, who had died in a bad fall over river rocks, in the episode "Fall". In "Troll", he mentions he has Scandinavian ancestors.
- Eric Lively as Carey Bell (seasons 2–3) – Clu's older brother, introduced in "Siren". He is more open to go along with Fi's paranormal theories, and sometimes comes up with his own, as in "Avatar". He dropped out of college and joined Molly's band against Irene's wishes in "Listen".
- Alexz Johnson as Annie Thelen (season 3) – Family friend of the Phillips'. She moves in with the Phillips family after Fi leaves for her aunt's to try to have a "normal life". Fi gives Annie a ring that previously belonged to her father, serving as a symbol of Annie's adventure into the paranormal world. There is often a mysterious black panther around just as something weird is happening, which she later finds out is her spirit protector.

=== Cast changes and guest appearances ===
- Despite many rumors about why she left the series after two seasons, Cara DeLizia revealed in an interview with Disney High author Ashley Spencer that it was her mother's decision to ask that she be released from her contract. "I didn't want to leave. I wanted to stay, and Disney wanted me to stay," DeLizia said in Spencer's 2024 book. "But I was a kid. It was out of my control, and it was really hard."
- In the season 3 episode "Earth 101," Fi's cameo appearance was done through past vocal footage and a look-alike stand-in. DeLizia had no part in the episode.
- Erik von Detten was unavailable during much of the show's second season, only appearing in 7 of its 26 episodes. He returned in the third season in several guest spots.
- Teryl Rothery played Irene Bell in the pilot episode "Family Reunion", before being permanently replaced by Belinda Metz.
- The Moffatts made a guest appearance in the episode "Destiny".
- SHeDAISY made a guest appearance in the episode "Listen".
- Dionne Warwick appeared in the episode "Lost" as Effy.
- Bo Diddley appeared in the episode "Blues" as Frank.

== Music ==
The series featured original songs sung by both Mackenzie Phillips and Alexz Johnson. Songs sung by Phillips include the theme "In the Darkness", "Another World", "Rebecca", "The Rock" and "Love is Broken". Each of the songs usually tied into the theme of the episode it was featured in. For example, "Rebecca" was featured in the episode "Rebecca", which dealt with Molly's former best friend of the same name who vanished when she was seemingly 13 years old. A compilation of Molly's songs was featured in the episode "Encore."

During seasons 1 and 2, a music video which features over 62 clips from the first season, was aired. The song is "In the Darkness". It starts out with Jack and Clu fooling around, Clu howling and both strumming a guitar. Molly comes to them in the tour bus and tells them it is time for her second show, and that means bed. Fi closes her computer and says goodnight. Jack hugs Molly goodnight. Clu tells Molly to "break a leg", Molly says, "Thank you, Clu" and shakes his hand. They leave. She goes out of the bus and starts to sing in a strange set.

"Last Night Blues," from the season 2 episode "Blues", was the only occasion Cara DeLizia had to sing during her stint on the show. The song was supernaturally transferred to the characters from a murdered blues musician.

Season 3 mainly used the music of Alexz Johnson. One of Johnson's original songs, "Dream About You", was featured in the episode "Carnival." A music video by Johnson, "Shadows", was also featured near the end of the show's run on Disney Channel.

The following is an incomplete listing of music from So Weird. With the exception of "Lorena" and occasional musical guest appearances, all songs are original, created especially for the series.

=== Introduced in Season 1 ===
- "In the Darkness (Is the Light)"

Short Version #1 – featured in the opening theme of Season 1
Season 1 Version – featured in the official music video, "Web Sight" and "Singularity"
Short Version #2 – featured in the opening theme of seasons 2 and 3
Season 2 Version – featured in "Second Generation" and "Encore"
Bricriu's Version – featured in "Destiny"
Music by Annmarie Montade
Lyrics by Jon Cooksey
Sung by Mackenzie Phillips

- "More Like a River"

Acoustic Version – featured in "Memory"
Piano Version – featured in "OOPA"
Guitar Version – featured in "Encore"
Music by Brent Belke
Lyrics by Jon Cooksey
Sung by Mackenzie Phillips

- "Rebecca"

Guitar Version – featured in "Rebecca"
Piano Version – featured in "Rebecca"
Acoustic Version – featured in "Siren"
Music by Annmarie Montade
Lyrics by Jon Cooksey
Sung by Mackenzie Phillips

- "She Sells"

Acoustic Version – featured in "Tulpa", "Drive" and "Second Generation"
Original Version – featured in "Drive" and "Encore"
Music by Annmarie Montade
Lyrics by Jon Cooksey
Sung by Mackenzie Phillips

=== Introduced in Season 2 ===
- "Another World"

David Steele's Version – featured in "Medium" and "Fall"
Mackenzie Phillips' Version – featured in "Encore"
Music by Annmarie Montade
Lyrics by Jon Cooksey
Sung by Mackenzie Phillips/David Steele

- "New Math"

Featured in "Listen", "Blues", "Fathom" and "The Muse"
Music by Annmarie Montade
Lyrics by Jon Cooksey
Sung by Mackenzie Phillips

- "The Rock"

Featured in "Banshee"
Music by Annmarie Montade
Lyrics by Jon Cooksey
Sung by Mackenzie Phillips

- "Last Night Blues"

Featured in "Blues"
Music by Annmarie Montade
Lyrics by Jon Cooksey
Sung by Mackenzie Phillips
Alternate Version "Chicago Blues" sung by Roger Ridley

- "Origami"

Featured in "Fathom"
Music by Jeff Neill & Mark Scott
Lyrics by Jon Cooksey
Sung by Mackenzie Phillips

- "Love Is Broken"

Featured in "Twin"
Music by Annmarie Montade
Lyrics by Jon Cooksey
Arrangement by Jeff Neill & Mark Scott
Sung by Mackenzie Phillips

=== Introduced in Season 3 ===
- "One In A Million World"

Sung by Mackenzie Phillips and Alexz Johnson

- "To Dream About You"

Sung by Alexz Johnson
Co-written by Johnson

- "Never Give Up"

Sung by Alexz Johnson

- "What You Do (Voodoo)"

Music by Terry Frewer
Sung by Mackenzie Phillips

- "Thinkin' About Tomorrow"

Sung by Mackenzie Phillips

- "A Different Story"

Sung by Mackenzie Phillips

- "Push Me, Pull You"

Sung by Alexz Johnson

- "'Cause You're Watching Over Me (Shadows)"

Sung by Alexz Johnson

- "While I Stare"

Sung by Mackenzie Phillips

=== Other songs ===
- "Lorena" (folk song fragment)

Sung by Mackenzie Phillips

- "Star-Dot-Star" (fictional jingle)

Sung by cast (and by gremlins)

- "Jack's Lullaby"

Sung by Patrick Levis

- "Questions"

Sung by Jewel Staite

- "Little Goodbyes"

Sung by SheDaisy

- "Misery"

Sung by The Moffatts

== Book series ==
Novelizations of five episodes in season 1 of So Weird were published by Disney Press as mass-market paperbacks, beginning with Family Reunion by Parke Godwin. The short-lived series ended with Strangeling by Cathy East Dubowski in 2000. The series has long-since fallen out of print, although used vintage copies of the books continue to appear on bookselling platforms.

== Broadcast ==
After 65 episodes, Disney Channel ceased production of the show. Reruns of the series continued to be aired until September 2003, when So Weird was removed from the Disney Channel schedule altogether, and has not aired since.

On October 14, 2019, Disney included So Weird in the list of films and television series that would be available to watch on their streaming platform Disney+ on launch day, November 12, 2019. Having never been released on DVD, this marked the first time So Weird was available to watch legally in the U.S. since 2003. Within a month of its launch, the second season was removed from the service for undisclosed reasons, but was later added back on December 18, 2019.
