= Lindsay Felton =

American actress

- Born: Lindsay Marie Felton; December 4, 1984 (age 41); Seattle, Washington, U.S.
- Occupation: Actress
- Years active: 1994–2015

Lindsay Marie Felton (born December 4, 1984) is an American former actress. She is best known for her roles as Caitlin Seeger in Caitlin's Way and Anna Morgan in Anna's Dream.

== Life and career ==
Felton was born in Seattle, Washington. She had a variety of roles since beginning acting in advertisements on local television at age three.

Her first major network television appearance came in 1994 on the short-lived ABC sitcom Thunder Alley, as the granddaughter of Edward Asner's character. She made her feature film debut in 1998 in 3 Ninjas: High Noon at Mega Mountain.

In 2000, Felton got her first starring role, as Caitlin Seeger on the Nickelodeon series Caitlin's Way, which ran for 52 episodes.

Felton then moved on to several leading roles in independent movies released on TV or video, including the short film Size 'Em Up, PAX-TV's movie Anna's Dream, and the direct-to-video release The Metro Chase. In 2003 she appeared in the feature film Grind as Denise Jenson. In 2006, she appeared in ER episode 273, "Heart of the Matter", as Donna Palsey. She appeared in the independent film Two Star State of Mind in 2008. Felton appeared on the VH1 reality show Scream Queens. The show premiered on October 20, 2008, and Felton was eliminated in the final episode, finishing in third place.

== Filmography ==
=== Film ===
Year	Title	Role	Notes
1998	3 Ninjas: High Noon at Mega Mountain	Jennifer	
1998	The Adventures of Ragtime	Amy Blue	
2001	Size 'em up	Samantha	Short film
2003	Grind	Denise	
2009	Two Star State of Mind	Beth Wright	Video
2011	Raymond Did It	Tammy	
2013	Leaving Circadia	Gina	
2014	The Genesis of Lincoln	Staccato Martin	
2015	Fated	Natasha "Natalie" Pierce	Short film

=== Television ===
Year	Title	Role	Notes
1994-95	Thunder Alley	Jenny Turner	Main role (27 episodes)
1998	The Pretender	Hostage Daughter	Episode: "Bulletproof"
1999	Stray Dog	Caitlin Seeger	TV film
2000	Movie-Stars	Jett	Episode: "He's Reese. He's Here. Get Used to It."
2000-02	Caitlin's Way	Caitlin Seeger	Lead role (52 episodes)
2001	The Nightmare Room	April	Episode: "Fear Games"
2002	Anna's Dream	Anna Morgan	TV film
2004	The Metro Chase	Alex Monroe	TV film
2006	ER	Donna Palsey	Episode: "Heart of the Matter"
2008	Scream Queens	Herself	Season 1
2013	Orange is the new Black	Clain	Episode: "Blood Donut"

== Awards and nominations ==
Year	Award	Category	Title of work	Result
1995	Young Artist Award	Best Performance by an Actress Under Ten in a TV Series	Thunder Alley	Nominated
2001	Gemini Award	Best Performance in a Children's or Youth Program or Series	Caitlin's Way (for episode #2.1: "The Present - Part 1")	Nominated
2001	Young Artist Award	Best Performance in a TV Drama Series - Leading Young Actress	Caitlin's Way	Nominated
2002	Young Artist Award	Best Performance in a TV Drama Series - Leading Young Actress	Caitlin's Way	Nominated
2003	Young Artist Award	Best Performance in a TV Movie, Mini-Series or Special - Supporting Young Actress	Anna's Dream	Nominated
