= Caitlin's Way =

2000 teen drama series

- Also known as: Just a Kid (Australia); Caitlin, Montana (French)
- Genre: Teen drama
- Created by: Thomas W. Lynch; Paul M. Belous
- Starring: Lindsay Felton; Cynthia Belliveau; Jeremy Foley; Ken Tremblett
- Opening theme: "Wishing for a Sail" by Dig Circus
- Composer: Reg Powell
- Countries of origin: United States; Canada
- No. of seasons: 3
- No. of episodes: 52

Production
- Executive producers: Jay Firestone; Adam Haight; John D. Lynch
- Producers: Helene White; Jana Veverka
- Cinematography: Cameron Macdonald (season 1); Dean Bennett (season 2)
- Editor: Paul Mortimer
- Running time: 24 minutes
- Production companies: Riverwood Productions; Fireworks Pictures; Lynch Entertainment; Nickelodeon Productions

Original release
- Network: Nickelodeon (U.S.); YTV (Canada)
- Release: March 11, 2000 – April 28, 2002

Caitlin's Way (entitled as Just a Kid for broadcasts in Australia/New Zealand and British dependencies and Caitlin, Montana in French for broadcasts in Canada/France and dependencies) is a teen drama television series that aired from 2000 to 2002. It originally aired on Nickelodeon in the United States and YTV in Canada. The series was co-created by Thomas W. Lynch and Paul M. Belous.

== Plot ==
Caitlin's Way focuses on Caitlin Seeger (played by Lindsay Felton), a troubled girl who lives on the streets of Philadelphia, Pennsylvania. After being arrested, a judge offers Caitlin the option of going to a youth detention center or moving in with her late mother Katherine's cousin in the fictional town of "High River" in Montana. Caitlin chooses the latter. After moving in with her aunt Dori, her husband Jim and their son Griffen on their ranch, she experiences culture shock. Caitlin, still distraught from her mother's sudden death when Caitlin was just eight-years-old, seeks to adjust to a loving family and a permanent home.

== Production ==
Production on season one began in 1999. Filming for season two began in June 2000. The primary filming location for the series was shot in High River in southeastern Alberta, and additional scenes were shot in Calgary, Alberta where the C-Train is occasionally seen in the background.

== Cast ==
=== Main characters ===
- Caitlin Seeger (Lindsay Felton)

Caitlin Seeger is a 14-year-old girl who has been in and out of foster homes since age eight, when her mother Katherine suddenly died. Her father had left when she was four. Caitlin, still angry about her mother's death, hides her grief in her tough-girl persona and gets into trouble frequently. She loves photography and is usually seen with her camera which once belonged to her mother. Her dream is to become a professional photographer. After getting in trouble and expelled from her Catholic school, Caitlin is given the option of going to a juvenile detention facility or going to live with her mother Katherine's cousin Dori Lowe (whom Caitlin did not even know existed), her husband Jim and their son Griffen in Montana by the judge that she meets with. Caitlin agrees to go to Montana. While there, she meets and rescues a stallion from wranglers whom she names Bandit. As time goes by, the Lowes and Caitlin learn to accept each other and Caitlin gets what she's always wanted: a loving family and a permanent home. She loves to read and her best subject in school is English; her worst is math. The locket that Caitlin wears 24/7 is the same locket that her mother used to wear and she is often seen listening to her mini CD player. Caitlin used to play soccer and she associates the sport with her mom because the last time Caitlin played soccer with her best friend was the day that her mom Katherine died. Caitlin's favorite color is black.

- Dori Lowe (Cynthia Belliveau)

Dori Lowe is Jim's wife, Griffin's mom, the cousin of Caitlin's mother Katherine, and a veterinarian. She suggests that Caitlin come to live with them. Dori told Caitlin once that she and her mother never really had much contact which is why they did not know about her until recently. She has a home office and works with most of the animals in High River. As a loving mother, Dori tries to warm up to Caitlin by acting like her mother figure, which at times Caitlin resents since she doesn't want anybody taking her mom's place and causes her to push Dori away with her harsh words. Caitlin eventually learned the truth about her mother's death from Dori who tells her she died from an aneurysm that killed her instantly. Caitlin breaks down over hearing this and Dori says she assumed that Caitlin knew. Caitlin admits to her that nobody had ever told her. The two eventually become closer throughout the show and Caitlin finally accepts Dori as her new mother figure after Dori explains that she wants to be a mother to Caitlin, but not be one that replaces her own mother. In high school, Dori was on the girls' soccer team but wasn't very good so she had to work particularly hard to stay on the team.

- Jim Lowe (Ken Tremblett)

Jim Lowe is Dori's husband, Griffin's father, and the local sheriff. Caitlin sees him as the only strong father figure she has had in her entire life since her own father left her. Jim is a loving father and husband, always willing to help his family out whenever they need him. When Caitlin first comes to live with them, the two of them feel awkward around each other, but they eventually come past that. Jim loves Caitlin as his if she was his own daughter and does whatever he can to help her.

- Griffin Lowe (Jeremy Foley)

Griffin Lowe is the 14-year-old son of Jim and Dori and Caitlin's second cousin. He is a very smart kid, always earning straight As. Griffin's hobbies include computers, riding his bike, playing the guitar, and singing in a band with his best friends Brett and Eric called Bad Hygiene. When he first learned that Caitlin would come to live with them, he wasn't too happy about it. The two of them often get into fights and Griffin will usually make cruel remarks about her past to anger Caitlin. Despite all the arguing, they eventually form a brother and sister like relationship and become each other's best friends. They will always help each other out, no matter what the situation is or how much trouble they get into. He is often the voice of reason for Caitlin and he's always there to give advice to her and has admitted to her that he never likes it when she is sad, but is always there to comfort her.

- Bandit

Bandit is a wild buckskin stallion whom Caitlin helps rescue from wranglers who later rescues her from a rabid wolf and the two soon bond. He belongs to Caitlin as of "Stray Part 3." Dori allows her to keep him after Bandit doesn't show any signs of rabies. Caitlin decides to name him Bandit, after a horse that was in a story her mother used to read to her when she was little. She rides Bandit every day, except when she is grounded. In "The Present Part 1,” Will and Sarah mistakenly believed Bandit was their colt that ran away, nearly taking him from Caitlin. However, in "The Present Part 2" Will sees how much Caitlin loves Bandit and appreciates the good home she has given him, leading Will to allow Caitlin to keep him. Bandit almost died at the end of Season 1 after he got his leg caught in a rusty old bear trap, but Dori saved his life.

- Cousin (Season 1)

Cousin is Griffen's dog. He's very friendly and loves everybody. During "Making Allowances," when Caitlin brought Cousin into the store, he caused a ruckus.

- Alfalfa (Season 2)

Alfalfa is Caitlin's calico cat. Dori comes up with Alfalfa's name while she's bottle feeding her after she's born. Caitlin decides to give Alfalfa to Ruth to replace her cat Mortimer, but when she gets to Ruth's house, she finds her dead and as a result she gets to keep her kitten.

=== Secondary characters ===
- Brett Stevens (Stephen Warner)

Brett Stevens is Griffin's best friend. He plays the bass in their band "Bad Hygiene" and is on the basketball team at High River High School. He has a little sister named Julie and a girlfriend named Taylor. Brett and Taylor broke up twice, but eventually got back together for good in Season 2. His dream is to play in the NBA after he graduates from high school. Like Griffen and Eric, Brett loves riding his bike.

- Taylor Langford (Tania Saulnier)

Taylor Langford is Brett's girlfriend, Caitlin's rival but in a few episodes they both bond a little bit, and Griffin's main love interest during Season 1. Taylor's on the cheerleading squad and the girls' soccer team and is perhaps the biggest snob at High River High School. Taylor and her mother had won the mother-daughter horse race every year until Caitlin and Dori broke their streak. She is a complicated character: In "All About Caitlin," we learn that Taylor changes best friends every week and that her father doesn't give her enough love. Her goal in life is to be an entertainment lawyer. Taylor and Griffen become friends in "All About Caitlin". Taylor just wants Caitlin to be normal. Taylor's favorite color is pink.

- Eric Anderson (Brendan Fletcher)

Eric Anderson is Griffin's other best friend and Caitlin's other rival. Eric plays the drums in their band "Bad Hygiene," and he's on the High River High School football team. Griffin has known Eric since kindergarten. Like Taylor, he is a complicated character: it is inferred that he acts like a jerk because his father is always putting him down. His dream is to own a cattle ranch and maybe open up a Cow Boy themed restaurant after graduation. Like Griffin and Brett, Eric loves riding his bike.

- Annie (Julianna Enciu) – Season 1

Annie is Caitlin's new best friend and Griffin's new main love interest. We meet her in "Caitlin's First Dance". At first, Annie is visiting High River for the weekend, but then she and her family ultimately move to High River. Annie takes Caitlin's place as the new kid at High River High School. Annie loves horses and she was going to take lessons with her best friend Janet before she moved to High River. Annie's good at dancing. Annie works as a part-time Waitress at the diner. Caitlin filled in for Annie once so that she could attend her cousin's wedding. When Annie meets Caitlin, she befriends her and she's the only one who likes Caitlin and accepts her for who she is.

- Julie Stevens (Alexandra Purvis)
- Episodes: "Little Sister" and "All About Caitlin"

Julie Stevens is Brett's little sister, whose dream is to do barrel racing. She has an American Paint Horse named Patches. Julie's parents almost sold Patches because his upkeep was so expensive, and Julie was heartbroken at the thought of losing Patches forever. Caitlin helped arrange for Patches to be boarded at the Lowe Ranch. As a result, Julie looks up to Caitlin and thinks she is cool. After "All About Caitlin," Julie isn't seen again and after "Solo," Julie isn't mentioned again.

- Jordan Clarke (Sean Amsing)

Jordan Clarke is one of Caitlin's friends. We meet him in Season 1. Jordan loves to play basketball and he's good at rapping. Jordan became hooked on rap when he went to a football game with his mom when he was five. Jordan saw some break dancers during half time so he jumped out of his seat and tried to mimic their moves. Then Jordan fell and knocked out three of his teeth. He wants to be a rapper when he grows up. In "The Present Part 2" at school the next day when it seems that Caitlin's going to lose Bandit forever Jordan performs a Birthday Rap that he wrote for Caitlin to cheer her up.

- Nikki (Alana Husband) – Season 2

Nikki is Griffin's ex-girlfriend. They got together in Season 2, but they broke up in "Juliet & Her Romeo," because they never hung out anymore due to Griffin constantly hanging out with Brett and Eric. However, Nikki and Griffin are still friends. She plays the clarinet in the High River High School band.

- Will Findlay (Jason McSkimming) – Season 2

Will Findlay is Caitlin's main love interest and a misunderstood bad boy. He is introduced in "The Present Part 1". He and Caitlin share a lot in common (loss of a parent, moved around a lot, etc.) His mother, Sarah is a mean snob that often neglects Will. Will has a new horse named Sinbad. Will dated Taylor for a little while to get back at Caitlin for doing the right thing after they ruined Eric's crop when Will talked Caitlin into skipping summer school after she failed math. Will's best subject in school is math. Caitlin helped Will change after his motorcycle accident when he admitted to her that he'd hurt Sarah emotionally to get back at her for not being there for him. In "Burned," Caitlin and Will kiss for the first time.

- Garth Crowchild (Nathaniel Arcand) – Season 1

Garth is Jim's Native American assistant and his best friend. Garth is one of the local Cops in High River. Garth saved Caitlin's life after she stole Jim and Dori's new Jeep and got into a car accident. Luckily, Caitlin was wearing her Seat belt when the accident happened. Garth has a very interesting relationship with Caitlin.

=== Guest stars ===
- Danny O'Donoghue (Danny O'Donoghue)
- Season 2

Danny O'Donoghue is Caitlin's former foster brother. Caitlin and Danny used to live in the same foster home, and Danny would always try to keep Caitlin out of trouble since he's older. One day Danny couldn't take it anymore and took off. Danny eventually joined MyTown, but he has since gone on to join The Script.

- David Seeger (Joe-Norman Shaw)
- Episodes: "The Promise Part 1" and "The Promise Part 2"

David Seeger is Caitlin's long lost father and Katherine's husband, first appearing in "The Promise Part 1". David left Caitlin when she was four years old, and she had not seen him ever since and is still bitter towards him for leaving. In Season 1, Caitlin tried to find him, but changed her mind at the last minute because she got scared. David's a sculptor. David was falsely accused of running a counterfeit scam in High River. After a fight with Caitlin when he missed the Father – Daughter hockey tournament, he almost left High River, but the two of them eventually made things right. David admitted to Caitlin that he has always felt guilty about leaving Caitlin and her mother Katherine, but explains to her why he did. David moved to High River in "The Promise Part 2".

== Episodes ==
=== Season 1 (2000) ===
No. overall	No. in season	Title	Directed by	Written by	Original release date
1	1	"Stray (Part 1)"	Nicholas Kendall	Jana Veverka	March 11, 2000
2	2	"Stray (Part 2)"	Nicholas Kendall	Jana Veverka	March 11, 2000
3	3	"Stray (Part 3)"	Nicholas Kendall	Jana Veverka	March 11, 2000
4	4	"Boundaries"	Jane Thompson	Brent Piaskoski	March 12, 2000
5	5	"Fear and Falling in Montana"	Peter D. Marshall	Therese Beaupre & Edgar Lyall	March 19, 2000
6	6	"Making Allowances"	Jimmy Kaufman	Brent Piaskoski	March 26, 2000
7	7	"Solar Mates"	Jimmy Kaufman	Edgar Lyall & Therese Beaupre	April 2, 2000
8	8	"Bear with Me"	Gary Harvey	Suzanne Bolch & John May	April 9, 2000
9	9	"Horror Show"	James Marshall	Therese Beaupre	April 15, 2000
10	10	"Take Your Best Shot"	Jimmy Kaufman	Brent Piaskoski	April 16, 2000
11	11	"Caitlin's First Dance"	Alan Simmonds	Edgar Lyall	April 23, 2000
12	12	"Testing"	Norma Bailey	Therese Beauregard	April 30, 2000
13	13	"Deputy for a Day"	Alan Simmonds	Edgar Lyall	May 7, 2000
14	14	"Along for the Ride"	Larry McLean	Brent Piaskoski	May 14, 2000
15	15	"Puppy Love"	Jimmy Kaufman	Tony DiFranco	May 21, 2000
16	16	"Caitlin's Trust"	Gary Harvey	Therese Beaupre	July 23, 2000
17	17	"The Candidate"	Peter D. Marshall	Beth Stewart	July 30, 2000
18	18	"Ties That Bind"	Patrick Williams	Jana Veverka	August 6, 2000
19	19	"Playing Caitlin"	Nicholas Kendall	Therese Beaupre	August 13, 2000
20	20	"Truth or Dare"	Jimmy Kaufman	Melissa Mortimer & Jana Veverka	August 20, 2000
21	21	"True Grits"	Larry McLean	Brent Piaskoski	August 27, 2000
22	22	"Under Western Skies"	Jimmy Kaufman	Jana Veverka	September 3, 2000

=== Season 2 (2000–01) ===
No. overall	No. in season	Title	Directed by	Written by	Original release date
23	1	"The Present (Part 1)"	Nicholas Kendall	Therese Beaupre & Jana Veverka	October 7, 2000
24	2	"The Present (Part 2)"	Nicholas Kendall	Therese Beaupre & Jana Veverka	October 7, 2000
25	3	"Money Walks"	James Marshall	Avrum Jacobson	October 14, 2000
26	4	"Principles"	James Marshall	Beth Stewart	October 21, 2000
27	5	"Free Fall"	Matt Palmer	Suzanne Bolch & John May	November 4, 2000
28	6	"Beautiful Dreamers"	Nicholas Kendall	Christophe Phillips	November 18, 2000
29	7	"Tremor"	Anthony Atkins	Sean Reycraft	December 2, 2000
30	8	"All Night Long"	Jane E. Thompson	Therese Beaupre	December 9, 2000
31	9	"The Easy Way"	Jane E. Thompson	Adam Mann	December 16, 2000
32	10	"Belated Birthday"	James Marshall	Edgar Lyall	January 21, 2001
33	11	"Cows and Effects"	Francis Damberger	Elizabeth Stewart	February 11, 2001
34	12	"Icicle"	Jimmy Kaufman	Therese Beaupre	February 18, 2001
35	13	"Side Kicks"	Peter D. Marshall	Wilson Coneybeare	February 25, 2001
36	14	"Outlaws"	Anthony Atkins	Therese Beaupre	March 4, 2001
37	15	"Unplugged"	Francis Damberger	Edgar Lyall, Therese Beaupre, & Rebecca Schechter	March 11, 2001
38	16	"Dr. Truth"	Patrick Williams	David Sutherland	March 18, 2001
39	17	"Chemistry"	Matt Palmer	Melissa Mortimer	March 25, 2001
40	18	"Little Sister"	Alan Simmonds	Story by : Sean Reycraft; Teleplay by : Rebecca Schechter	April 1, 2001
41	19	"Juliet & Her Romeo"	Francis Damberger	Therese Beaupre	April 22, 2001

=== Season 3 (2001–02) ===
No. overall	No. in season	Title	Directed by	Written by	Original release date
42	1	"Mother of the Year"	Jane E. Thompson	Jana Veverka	May 13, 2001
43	2	"Bowlerama"	Alan Simmonds	Christophe Phillips	March 3, 2002
44	3	"Heartbeat"	Francis Damberger	Jana Veverka	March 10, 2002
45	4	"All About Caitlin"	Nicholas Kendall	Rebecca Schechter	March 17, 2002
46	5	"Truant"	James Marshall	David Sutherland	March 24, 2002
47	6	"Old Friends"	James Marshall	Rebecca Schechter	March 31, 2002
48	7	"Duh, Truth, Uh-Huh"	Don Shebib	Therese Beaupre	April 7, 2002
49	8	"Solo"	Richard Leiterman	Therese Beaupre	April 14, 2002
50	9	"The Promise (Part 1)"	Francis Damberger	Jana Veverka	April 21, 2002
51	10	"The Promise (Part 2)"	Francis Damberger	Therese Beaupre	April 28, 2002
52	11	"Burned"	Mitch Ness	Rebecca Schechter	February 11, 2008 (on The N)

== Broadcast history ==
On March 4, 2001, Nickelodeon premiered its new Sunday night schedule called TEENick, which included Caitlin's Way. Nickelodeon opted against renewing the show for a new season in April 2001. The remaining new episodes were shown throughout early 2002. On January 24, 2003, reruns began airing on Noggin's teen block, The N. Reruns later aired on TeenNick in the United States and CH and Global TV in Canada. The series was broadcast by the Disney Channel in UK and Ireland, Latin America, the Middle East and some European countries and was aired in Indonesia by Global TV from 2006 until 2007.
