= Sitting Ducks (lithograph) =

1977 lithograph created by poster artist Michael Bedard

The idiom "sitting duck" which led to the series of lithographs and other media.

Sitting Ducks is a lithograph created by the Canadian poster artist Michael Bedard in 1977. It depicts a literal interpretation of the idiom "sitting duck". Three ducks are relaxing in the sun on white chairs by the poolside, one looks up and notices two bullet holes in the wall.

Bedard then went on to create an entire series of "Sitting Ducks" related lithographs, which culminated in a children's book, an animated series and a video game.

== Book ==
Bedard's 1998 picture book Sitting Ducks (ISBN 0-399-22847-0) has the plot that alligators hatch ducks in a "duck factory", then send them to Ducktown, where the ducks live an idyllic life, encouraged by billboards to fatten up. The alligators presumably eat the ducks once they are fat. One duck is befriended by an alligator, who lets him know that if only the Ducktown residents would not get fat, they could fly away and avoid being eaten.

The book won the 1998 California Book Award in the 10 & under category.

== Cartoon ==
In 2001 Sitting Ducks was produced by Universal Television. It ran for two seasons on Cartoon Network and during that time spawned merchandise such as toys, clothing, books, as well as a video game.

The show takes place in a town called Ducktown and focuses on a duck named Bill, and his best friend Aldo, a huge alligator from the neighboring town of Swampwood. Seeing as how ducks are favorite snacks of the alligators there, Bill and Aldo's friendship is rather unusual. The pair usually end up in various situations and adventures.

The show lasted 2 seasons, airing 26 episodes.
