= This Is Daniel Cook. =

Canadian children's television series

- Genre: Children
- Created by: J. J. Johnson; Blair Powers
- Written by: J.J. Johnson
- Directed by: J.J. Johnson
- Presented by: Daniel Cook
- Theme music composer: Melissa McClelland
- Opening theme: "This is Daniel Cook."
- Ending theme: "This is Daniel Cook." (Instrumental)
- Composer: Michael Ella
- Country of origin: Canada
- Original language: English
- No. of seasons: 2
- No. of episodes: 131

Production
- Executive producers: Mark J.W. Bishop; Matthew Hornburg
- Producers: J.J. Johnson; Blair Powers; Matthew J.R. Bishop; Mark J.W. Bishop; Matthew Hornburg
- Production location: Toronto, Ontario
- Editors: Matthew J.R. Bishop; Daniel Palmer; Ian Maxwell
- Camera setup: Multi-Camera
- Running time: 6 minutes
- Production companies: Marblemedia; Sinking Ship Productions

Original release
- Network: Treehouse TV/TVOntario/Knowledge Network/SCN/Access (Canada); Disney Channel (Playhouse Disney)/Qubo (United States)
- Release: September 6, 2004 – April 22, 2006

Related
- This Is Emily Yeung. I Dare You; This is Scarlett and Isaiah.

This Is Daniel Cook. (stylised as This is Daniel Cook.) is a Canadian children's television series created by J. J. Johnson and Blair Powers and produced by Toronto's Marblemedia and Sinking Ship Productions in association with Treehouse TV and TVOntario. It is shown in Canada on Treehouse TV, The TVOKids Block on TVOntario, Access, Knowledge Network, and SCN. The series also aired on the Disney Channel in the United States, in between programs in the mid-to-late 2000s. Qubo aired the show as a full 30-minute program. The series also aired on Disney in Japan, E-Junior in the United Arab Emirates and on ABC2 (in Australia).

The show is about a young boy (age 7 to 8 in the first seasons but age 9 in the second season) named Daniel Cook who learns new things and shares his experiences and adventures with other kids. At the start of every episode, he yells out his catchphrase, "Here we Are!"

In the series, he learns about taekwondo, gymnastics, and animals. He also visits a fire station, a YMCA, and more. The show was filmed in Toronto, Ontario, Nova Scotia, New Brunswick and Walt Disney World in Orlando, Florida in one episode. Every episode is six minutes long, while the half-hour shows consist of five six-minute episodes. The series has been sold by Distribution360 to over eighty-five countries worldwide, and dubbed into fourteen languages.

The series has also launched a six-volume book series distributed by Kids Can Press and produced by marblemedia. Five DVDs have also been released featuring episodes from the series.

A follow-up called This Is Emily Yeung. premiered on Treehouse TV in September 2006. Another follow-up called This is Scarlett and Isaiah, premiered on Treehouse TV from September 21, to November 22, 13

The series ended in April 2006.

== Episodes ==
=== Season 1 ===
1. This is Daniel Cook drawing a dragon.
2. This is Daniel Cook at the market.
3. This is Daniel Cook feeding giraffes.
4. This is Daniel Cook building a sidewalk.
5. This is Daniel Cook learning Tae Kwon Do.
6. This is Daniel Cook making plasticine art.
7. This is Daniel Cook doing gymnastics.
8. This is Daniel Cook at the zoo.
9. This is Daniel Cook learning yo-yo tricks.
10. This is Daniel Cook tasting new fruits.
11. This is Daniel Cook creating a story.
12. This is Daniel Cook with the Famous People Players.
13. This is Daniel Cook in a rainforest.
14. This is Daniel Cook lawn bowling.
15. This is Daniel Cook making chocolates.
16. This is Daniel Cook painting a giraffe.
17. This is Daniel Cook at the library.
18. This is Daniel Cook training a puppy.
19. This is Daniel Cook exercising.
20. This is Daniel Cook making ice cream.
21. This is Daniel Cook doing magic.
22. This is Daniel Cook at the Science Centre.
23. This is Daniel Cook at a pool.
24. This is Daniel Cook hiking.
25. This is Daniel Cook making an apple pie.
26. This is Daniel Cook playing drums.
27. This is Daniel Cook at the fire station.
28. This is Daniel Cook learning about ponds.
29. This is Daniel Cook learning about electricity.
30. This is Daniel Cook doing ballet.
31. This is Daniel Cook making paper.
32. This is Daniel Cook at the farm.
33. This is Daniel Cook composting.
34. This is Daniel Cook learning to breakdance.
35. This is Daniel Cook making cookies.
36. This is Daniel Cook taking pictures.
37. This is Daniel Cook learning about Egypt.
38. This is Daniel Cook learning to milk a cow.
39. This is Daniel Cook tap dancing.
40. This is Daniel Cook learning to fly a plane.
41. This is Daniel Cook making a clay dragon.
42. This is Daniel Cook at Medieval Times.
43. This is Daniel Cook learning about dinosaurs.
44. This is Daniel Cook canoeing.
45. This is Daniel Cook making pizza.
46. This is Daniel Cook learning about poetry.
47. This is Daniel Cook at the police station.
48. This is Daniel Cook riding a horse.
49. This is Daniel Cook at the dentist.
50. This is Daniel Cook making a gingerbread house.
51. This is Daniel Cook making a book.
52. This is Daniel Cook at the art gallery.
53. This is Daniel Cook learning about beekeeping.
54. This is Daniel Cook busking.
55. This is Daniel Cook learning to figure skate.
56. This is Daniel Cook clowning.
57. This is Daniel Cook learning about trains.
58. This is Daniel Cook learning about raptors.
59. This is Daniel Cook visiting a doctor.
60. This is Daniel Cook rock climbing.
61. This is Daniel Cook making his show.
62. This is Daniel Cook at a street festival.
63. This is Daniel Cook with the Earth Rangers.
64. This is Daniel Cook bowling.
65. This is Daniel Cook on a tall ship.

=== Season 2 ===
1. This is Daniel Cook dogsledding.
2. This is Daniel Cook making maple syrup.
3. This is Daniel Cook downhill skiing.
4. This is Daniel Cook tobogganing.
5. This is Daniel Cook at a winter festival.
6. This is Daniel Cook baking a birthday cake.
7. This is Daniel Cook curling.
8. This is Daniel Cook building a road.
9. This is Daniel Cook getting an eye exam.
10. This is Daniel Cook carving a pumpkin.
11. This is Daniel Cook trick-or-treating.
12. This is Daniel Cook making felt art.
13. This is Daniel Cook learning to conduct.
14. This is Daniel Cook painting with watercolours.
15. This is Daniel Cook with a veterinarian.
16. This is Daniel Cook setting up an aquarium.
17. This is Daniel Cook making a Valentine's Day card.
18. This is Daniel Cook learning about the desert.
19. This is Daniel Cook decorating eggs.
20. This is Daniel Cook making a birdhouse.
21. This is Daniel Cook making a self-portrait.
22. This is Daniel Cook at a recycling plant.
23. This is Daniel Cook go-carting.
24. This is Daniel Cook creating a paper mache monster.
25. This is Daniel Cook writing a song.
26. This is Daniel Cook learning about dog guides.
27. This is Daniel Cook making an animal totem.
28. This is Daniel Cook making a puppet.
29. This is Daniel Cook creating stop motion animation.
30. This is Daniel Cook making a holiday ornament.
31. This is Daniel Cook in a marching band.
32. This is Daniel Cook making candy canes.
33. This is Daniel Cook making soap.
34. This is Daniel Cook meeting an elephant.
35. This is Daniel Cook on a safari.
36. This is Daniel Cook trying new vegetables.
37. This is Daniel Cook playing baseball.
38. This is Daniel Cook learning about butterflies.
39. This is Daniel Cook learning about whales.
40. This is Daniel Cook in a helicopter.
41. This is Daniel Cook at a waterfall.
42. This is Daniel Cook with a zookeeper.
43. This is Daniel Cook drawing a turtle.
44. This is Daniel Cook building a robot.
45. This is Daniel Cook singing jazz.
46. This is Daniel Cook making a Yule log.
47. This is Daniel Cook disco dancing.
48. This is Daniel Cook at a water park.
49. This is Daniel Cook riding in a hot air balloon.
50. This is Daniel Cook inventing a toy.
51. This is Daniel Cook learning yoga.
52. This is Daniel Cook digging for dinosaur bones.
53. This is Daniel Cook camping.
54. This is Daniel Cook exploring a cave.
55. This is Daniel Cook on an Eco Adventure.
56. This is Daniel Cook learning about visual effects.
57. This is Daniel Cook learning about space.
58. This is Daniel Cook at the airport.
59. This is Daniel Cook fishing.
60. This is Daniel Cook whale watching.
61. This is Daniel Cook exploring a beach.
62. This is Daniel Cook studying rocks.
63. This is Daniel Cook on a roller coaster.
64. This is Daniel Cook at a theme park.
65. This is Daniel Cook learning about stunts.
66. This is Daniel Cook learning about fish.

== Soundtrack ==
Cover for Here We Are! CD

In early 2007, The Children's Group released a soundtrack of This is Daniel Cook. on CD, which was called Here We Are!, named after the title star's catchphrase. It features the show's theme and the music used.

== Awards and nominations ==
Year	Award	Category	Recipients	Result
2005	Gemini Awards	Best Preschool Series	This is Daniel Cook.	Nominated
2005	Gemini Awards	Best Direction in a Children's/Youth Program/Series	J.J Johnson	Nominated
2005	Gemini Awards	Best Performance in a Children's/Youth Program/Series	Daniel Cook	Nominated
2005	Youth Media Alliance	Award of Excellence Awarded for “Best in Show”	This is Daniel Cook.	Won
2005	Youth Media Alliance	Award of Excellence Awarded for “All genres 3-5”	This is Daniel Cook.	Won
2005	Youth Media Alliance	Award of Excellence Awarded for thisisdanielcook.com	This is Daniel Cook.	Won
2005	Japan Prize (NHK)	Web Division for Producing	This is Daniel Cook.	Nominated
2006	Japan Prize (NHK)	Web Division for Producing	This is Daniel Cook.	Nominated
2006	Japan Prize (NHK)	Early Education Division	This is Daniel Cook.	Nominated
2006	Prix Jeunesse International	Television Prize	This is Daniel Cook.	Nominated
2006	Prix Jeunesse International	Preschool Web Prize	This is Daniel Cook.	Won
2008	Juno Awards	Best Children's Album of the year	Here We Are!	Nominated
