= Nicole Stamp =

Canadian actress

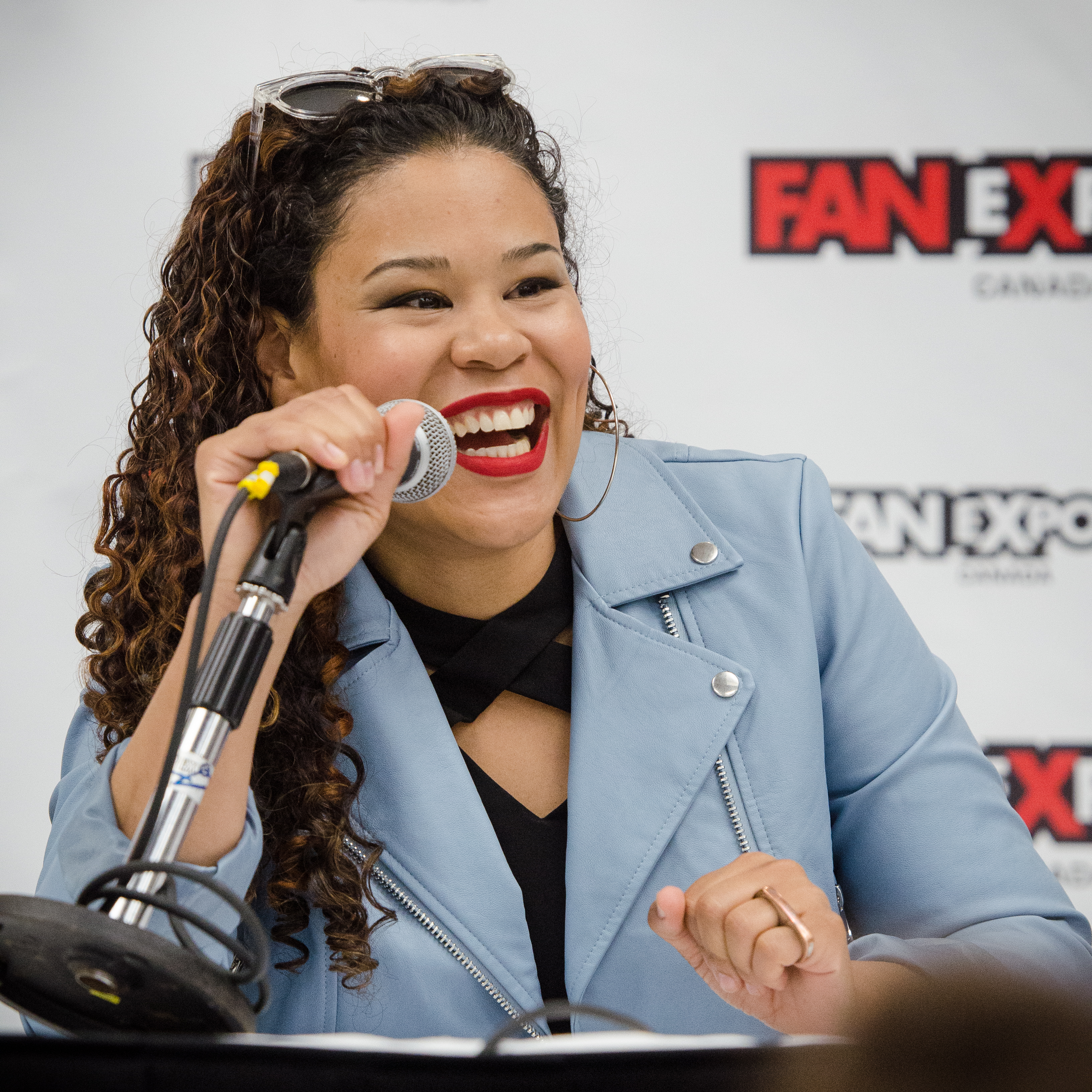
- Stamp at Fan Expo Canada in 2017
- Born: Etobicoke, Ontario, Canada 1978
- Occupations: Actress; filmmaker; television host; playwright
- Years active: 2004-present

Nicole Stamp is a Canadian television director, actress, filmmaker, writer and television host.

== Career ==
Stamp works as a writer, director, actress, and TV host. Her work has been nominated for six Canadian Screen Awards, in four different categories - as a director, writer, host, and series creator.

Currently, Stamp is the series creator, co-executive producer, writer, and host of Media Stamped, a new show teaching media literacy to children. Produced by Sinking Ship Entertainment for Telus Optik, Media Stamped won the Japan Prize Award of Honour and the Prix Jeunesse International Theme Prize, and was nominated for a Writers Guild of Canada Award for Best Teens/Tweens Script, a Youth Media Alliance Award, and three Canadian Screen Awards, including Best Series and Best Host.

Stamp started her career at TVOntario, where she co-hosted six seasons of TVOntario's afternoon block, The SPACE. Stamp also hosted the Ontario Championships of Reach For The Top from 2004 until 2009. She also wrote the series EnviroGirl, in which she played the title character, an educational superhero. TVOntario won the "Best Interactive" Gemini Award for the series Time Trackers, a historical children's series hosted by Stamp in which she also voiced various animated characters. Stamp also co-hosted TVOntario's Word Wizard, which was nominated for a Gemini Award for Best Interactive show. In total TVOntario has won two Geminis among six nominations for series in which Stamp hosted or performed lead roles.

Stamp improvised for two seasons with The Second City's Canadian National Touring Company. Stamp has directed and hosted hundreds of red carpet talent interviews at the Toronto International Film Festival for Alliance Films and Tribute Media.

Stamp's voiceover work includes playing Police Cadet Sanders in Total Drama Presents: The Ridonculous Race. She has also voiced characters for the video game company Ubisoft, and she voiced several characters in the TIFF short animated film Interregnum, about Rene Carmille, a Frenchman who bravely saved thousands of people from the Nazis. She voices the conjoined snakes Laziel and Raziel in the Cartoon Network pilot The Wonderful Wingits.

As a writer, Stamp's essays have been published by CNN and in the National Post. She created a critically acclaimed one-woman show, BETTER PARTS, which garnered 5 N's from NOW Magazine and was called "intoxicatingly written and joyously performed" by The Globe and Mail. Stamp has also been an invited member of the prestigious Playwrights' Unit at the Tarragon Theatre and the Theatre Passe Muraille Playwrights' Collective.

As an actress, Stamp is globally known for her portrayal of Melanippe "Mel" Callis in the Canadian Screen Award-winning webseries Carmilla, which has over 70 million views worldwide, as well as for her portrayal of Stamper on the Canadian Screen Award-winning webseries Tactical Girls.

In 2016, Stamp directed and co-hosted Inside Between, the digital aftershow for the City/Netflix drama, Between. In 2017, Stamp reprised her role as Melanippe "Mel" Callis in the feature film The Carmilla Movie, set five years after the end of the acclaimed webseries. In 2020, Stamp appeared in several episodes of the Netflix series Locke & Key as Nurse Ruth.

Stamp is a Toronto native who attended Richview Collegiate Institute and holds an Honours' Bachelor of Arts Degree in Theatre and English from the University of Toronto.

== Filmography ==
=== Shows ===
Show	Role	Years
Reach for the Top	Host	2004–2009
Razzberry Jazzberry Jam	Billie the Guitar	2008–2011
Dan for Mayor	Karen	2011
The Next Step	Lisa Thompson	2013
Remedy	Scrub Nurse / O.R. Nurse	2014
Odd Squad	Phyllis / Anne the Crossing Guard	2014–2016
Total Drama Presents: The Ridonculous Race	Cadet Sanders	2015
Carmilla	Melanippe "Mel" Callis	2015–2016
Tactical Girls	Stamper	2016–2018
The ZhuZhus	Whendy Sails	2016–2017
In Contempt	Lisa	2018
The Expanse	Medical Tech	2018
Rusty Rivets	Teacher Betty	2018–2020
Doomsday Brothers	Ana / Humunga	2020
Elinor Wonders Why	Ms. Llama	2020–present
Locke & Key	Nurse Ruth	2020–2021
See	Onica	2021
Media Stamped	Series Creator, Writer, Host	2024

== Awards and nominations ==
Year	Award	Category	Nominated work	Result	Link
2026	Prix Jeunesse International	Theme Prize	‘’Media Stamped’’	Won	
2025	Japan Prize	AWARD OF HONOR, Primary Age Division	‘’Media Stamped’’	Won	
2025	13th Canadian Screen Awards	BEST HOST, Factual / Reality / Competition	‘’Media Stamped’’	Nominated	
2025	13th Canadian Screen Awards	BEST SERIES, Non-Fiction Children’s or Youth	‘’Media Stamped’’	Nominated	
2025	Writers Guild of Canada Screenwriting Awards	BEST WRITING, Teens & Tweens	‘’Media Stamped’’	Nominated	
2022	10th Canadian Screen Awards	BEST DIRECTION, Children’s or Youth	‘’Lockdown 110: The Confession’’	Nominated	
2022	10th Canadian Screen Awards	BEST WRITING, Children’s or Youth	‘’Lockdown 111: Guilty Until Proven Innocent’’	Nominated	
2021	9th Canadian Screen Awards	BEST WRITING, Web Program or Series (shared with J. J. Johnson and Christin Simms)	‘’Lockdown 109: Social Togetherness’’	Nominated	
2021	Writers Guild of Canada Screenwriting Awards	BEST WRITING, Teens & Tweens (shared with J. J. Johnson and Christin Simms)	‘’Lockdown 109: Social Togetherness’’	Nominated	
