= Media Stamped =

Canadian children's television series

Media Stamped is a Canadian children's television series, which premiered on Telus's video-on-demand platforms in 2024. Hosted by children's educator Nicole Stamp, the series educates children about media literacy topics.

Produced by Sinking Ship Entertainment in conjunction with Global Citizen, the series features pedagogical input from various Canadian and American educational organizations. It was distributed in Canada on Telus TV+ and Telus Optik platforms, and internationally on Global Citizen's YouTube channel. A Spanish-language version of the show was also acquired for broadcast on Hispanic Information and Telecommunications Network in 2025.

== Awards ==
Award	Date of ceremony	Category	Recipient(s)	Result	Ref.
Canadian Screen Awards	2025	Best Children's or Youth Non-Fiction Program or Series	Alexis Grieve, J.J. Johnson, Blair Powers, Nicole Stamp, Lisa Gray, Matthew Macdonald-Turner	Nominated	
Canadian Screen Awards	2025	Best Host in a Variety, Lifestyle, Reality/Competition, or Talk Program or Series	Nicole Stamp	Nominated	
Canadian Screen Awards	2025	Best Editing in a Children's or Youth Program or Series	Emily Gilhooly, "Screen Time Is Yummy"	Nominated	
WGC Screenwriting Awards	2025	Tweens & Teens	Nicole Stamp, "What's In a Frame?"	Nominated	
