= This Is Emily Yeung. =

- Genre: Children's
- Created by: J. J. Johnson; Blair Powers
- Written by: J. J. Johnson
- Directed by: J. J. Johnson
- Presented by: Emily Yeung
- Theme music composer: Keith Macpherson
- Opening theme: "This is Emily Yeung."
- Ending theme: "This is Emily Yeung." (instrumental)
- Composer: Michael Ella
- Country of origin: Canada
- Original language: English
- No. of seasons: 3
- No. of episodes: 70

Production
- Executive producers: Mark J.W. Bishop; Matthew Hornburg
- Producers: J.J. Johnson; Blair Powers; Matthew J.R. Bishop; Mark J.W. Bishop; Matthew Hornburg
- Production locations: Toronto, Ontario
- Editors: Matthew J.R. Bishop; Daniel Palmer; Matt Burke; Dave Mitchell; Paul Winestock; Sarah Mooney
- Camera setup: Multi-Camera
- Running time: 6 minutes 26 minutes (holiday special)
- Production companies: Marblemedia; Sinking Ship Productions

Original release
- Network: Treehouse TV
- Release: September 4 – December 20, 2006

Related
- This Is Daniel Cook. I Dare You; This is Scarlett and Isaiah.

This Is Emily Yeung. (stylised as This is Emily Yeung.) is a 2006 Canadian children's television series created by J. J. Johnson and Blair Powers. It is produced by Toronto's Marblemedia and Sinking Ship Productions in association with Treehouse TV, and is the follow-up to their previous television series This Is Daniel Cook.. The series also aired on Treehouse TV in Canada and the Disney Channel in the United States.

This series follows a 6-year-old girl named Emily Yeung as she takes on new experiences and challenges with her own unique perspective and with a variety of guests from an odd range of fields from snake handlers to basketball players to bakers. The show was filmed in Toronto, Ontario, Alberta, Quebec, and Walt Disney World in Orlando, Florida. The series of sixty-five six-minute episodes and two thirty-minute specials has been sold by Distribution 360 to eighty-eight countries and dubbed into fourteen languages including French, Spanish, Portuguese, and Japanese.

The first DVD, This is Emily Yeung. Arts & Crafts was released on May 13, 2008. A second DVD, This is Emily Yeung. Celebrating the holidays was released on October 21, 2008.

== Episodes ==
=== Season 1 ===
1. This is Emily Yeung Beading.
2. This is Emily Yeung Making Origami.
3. This is Emily Yeung With The Humane Society.
4. This is Emily Yeung Making Animal Balloons.
5. This is Emily Yeung Making A Pineapple Upside-Down Cake.
6. This is Emily Yeung Snowboarding.
7. This is Emily Yeung Taking Care Of Horses.
8. This is Emily Yeung Making A Snowman.
9. This is Emily Yeung Cross-country skiing.
10. This is Emily Yeung Making A Clay Dolphin.
11. This is Emily Yeung Learning About Snakes.
12. This is Emily Yeung Learning Karate.
13. This is Emily Yeung Making Sushi.
14. This is Emily Yeung Visiting An Ice hotel.
15. This is Emily Yeung Ice fishing.
16. This is Emily Yeung Touring Quebec City.
17. This is Emily Yeung Making A Stuffed animal.
18. This is Emily Yeung Making Bubble tea.
19. This is Emily Yeung Learning An African dance.
20. This is Emily Yeung At An Amusement Park.
21. This is Emily Yeung Knitting.
22. This is Emily Yeung Putting On A Puppet Show.
23. This is Emily Yeung Exploring A Castle.
24. This is Emily Yeung Playing Basketball.
25. This is Emily Yeung With The Paramedics.
26. This is Emily Yeung Taking Care Of Kittens.

=== Season 2 ===
1. This is Emily Yeung Exploring The Forest.
2. This is Emily Yeung Learning About An Eco-House.
3. This is Emily Yeung Making Juice.
4. This is Emily Yeung Doing Science Experiments.
5. This is Emily Yeung Learning About Worms.
6. This is Emily Yeung Making A Medicine Wheel.
7. This is Emily Yeung Riding On A Tractor.
8. This is Emily Yeung Learning About Chickens.
9. This is Emily Yeung At The Post Office.
10. This is Emily Yeung Learning About Camels.
11. This is Emily Yeung Building A Tree House.
12. This is Emily Yeung Ballet dancing.
13. This is Emily Yeung Riding a Bike.
14. This is Emily Yeung Becoming a Cowgirl.
15. This is Emily Yeung Playing Road hockey.
16. This is Emily Yeung Visiting A Hot Spring.
17. This is Emily Yeung Exploring The Rocky Mountains.
18. This is Emily Yeung On a Rainy Day.
19. This is Emily Yeung Dressing Up.
20. This is Emily Yeung Learning About Fireworks.
21. This is Emily Yeung Swimming With Dolphins.
22. This is Emily Yeung Snorkeling.
23. This is Emily Yeung With Cirque du Soleil.
24. This is Emily Yeung Training To Be An Astronaut.
25. This is Emily Yeung Making Strawberry Jam.
26. This is Emily Yeung Building A Sand Sculpture.

=== Season 3 ===
1. This is Emily Yeung Making A Collage.
2. This is Emily Yeung With The Blue Man Group.
3. This is Emily Yeung Baking Bread.
4. This is Emily Yeung Planting A Tree.
5. This is Emily Yeung Making Muffins.
6. This is Emily Yeung Making A Suncatcher.
7. This is Emily Yeung Learning About Rabbits.
8. This is Emily Yeung Making A Wind Chime.
9. This is Emily Yeung Learning About Water Safety.
10. This is Emily Yeung Skipping Rope.
11. This is Emily Yeung Making Goat Cheese.
12. This is Emily Yeung Making A Mask.
13. This is Emily Yeung Playing Soccer.
14. This is Emliy Yeung Celebrating the Holidays.
15. This is Emily Yeung Celebrating Chanukah.
16. This is Emily Yeung Celebrating Eid.
17. This is Emily Yeung Celebrating Kwanzaa.
18. This is Emliy Yeung Exploring a Farm.

== Notable guests ==
- Chris Bosh
- Cady Coleman
- Karen Fralich
- Mike Holmes
- Maria Hupfield
- Karen Kain
- Lori-Ann Muenzer
- Hayley Wickenheiser

== Awards and nominations ==
Year	Award	Category	Recipient	Result
2007	Gemini Awards	Best Preschool Series	This is Emily Yeung.	Nominated
2007	Youth Media Alliance	Special Jury Prize Award	This is Emily Yeung.	Won
2007	Youth Media Alliance	Award of Excellence, All Genres 3–5	This is Emily Yeung.	Won
