= Roll Play =

Canadian interactive television series

- Genre: Education
- Created by: J. J. Johnson
- Written by: J. J. Johnson
- Directed by: J. J. Johnson; Liz Haines
- Narrated by: Nic Armour (season 1); Alezandria Coldevin (season 2)
- Composer: Michael-Paul Ella
- Country of origin: Canada
- Original language: English
- No. of seasons: 3
- No. of episodes: 129

Production
- Executive producers: J. J. Johnson; Blair Powers
- Producers: Blair Powers; J. J. Johnson; Matthew J.R. Bishop; Liz Haines
- Running time: 4 minutes
- Production companies: Sinking Ship Entertainment; Radio-Canada Télévision (season 1–2); Treehouse TV

Original release
- Network: Treehouse TV
- Release: May 13, 2006 – June 16, 2012

Roll Play is a Canadian live-action interactive children's television series created by J. J. Johnson and produced by Sinking Ship Entertainment and Radio-Canada Télévision for Treehouse TV. The series tells the viewers to copy the actions shown on screen. Puppets are featured, and are played by the Famous People Players, a Canadian black light puppetry theatre company based in Toronto. In the United States, a Spanish-language version airs on V-me during the commercial breaks. The show first aired on May 13, 2006 and concluded on June 16, 2012, after 3 seasons and 129 episodes aired.

== Characters ==
=== Season 1 ===
1. Chloe the Chicken
2. Frank the Crab
3. Larry the Manta Ray
4. Bill the Spider
5. Chuck the Shark
6. Mel the Kangaroo
7. Audrey the Octopus
8. Patrick the Triceratops
9. Jacko the Blue Jay
10. Morgan the Jellyfish
11. Sue the Cat
12. Taran and Tula Spider
13. Horatio the Penguin
14. Penelope the Penguin
15. Tom the Turtle
16. Ruckus the Dog
17. Joey the Baby Kangaroo
18. Rosa the Rabbit
19. Felix the Frog
20. Big Henry the Frog
21. Lancelot the Lion
22. Alice the Elephant
23. Stanley the Giraffe
24. Veronica the Dolphin
25. Egbert the Lovebird
26. Betty the Crocodile
27. Ming the Flamingo
28. Bear the Polar Bear
29. Snake
30. Charlotte the Squirrel
31. Oscar the Owl
32. Maurice the Monkey
33. Strummer the Raccoon
34. George the Mouse
35. Giga the Giganotosaurus

=== Season 2 ===
1. Lola the Mermaid/Caveman
2. Tabitha the Cricket
3. Roberta the Ostrich
4. Spiny the Stegosaurus
5. Joshua the Cow
6. Coral the Zebra
7. Stanley the Skunk
8. Lucy the Woodpecker
9. Conrad the Goat
10. Frances the Pig
11. Arjun the Beaver
12. Darrell the Possum
13. Bobby the Bird of Paradise
14. Ana the Howler Monkey
15. Carol the Sloth
16. Francine the Cheetah
17. Beatrice the Bumblebee
18. Tula the Spider
19. Diego the Praying Mantis
20. Albert the Ant
21. Gus the Grasshopper
22. Fuzzy the Caterpillar
23. Stella the Starfish
24. Kiara the Platypus
25. Michelle the Hammerhead Shark
26. Gilly the Hedgehog
27. Shelley the Tortoise
28. Louie the Loon
29. Ed the Moose
30. Marvin & Laura Meerkat
31. Carl the Magic Dragon
32. Jacques the Robot
33. Sheila the Pirate
34. Marina the Seahorse
35. Dinger the Hummingbird
36. Cameron the Chameleon
37. Screamer the Hyena
38. Gladys the Anteater
39. Zil & Liz Centipede
40. Greg the Pill Bug
41. Manny the Tasmanian Devil
42. Sam the Pterodactyl

== Kids ==
=== Season 1 ===
1. Madison Dillon (Pink tank top with blue shorts)
2. Jamila Beckford (Blue t-shirt with orange pants)
3. Max Brauch (Green t-shirt with black pants)
4. Diego Campos (Orange t-shirt with black shorts)
5. Alycia Reid (Purple t-shirt with yellow shorts)
6. Bobby Johnson (Red t-shirt and blue shorts)
7. Savien Assoon (Yellow tank top with red shorts)
8. Kevin Yang (Grey t-shirt with green shorts)
9. Emily Yeung (Black t-shirt with blue pants)
10. Nicole Ly (Mauve t-shirt with hot pink shorts)
11. Justin Kwan (Blue tank top with gray pants)
12. Catherine Schwab (Pink t-shirt with blue leggings)

=== Season 2 ===
1. Ari Aben
2. Joanna and Julia Alphonso
3. Rouzbeh Aslanbick
4. Stella Azzopardi
5. Niklaus Boatswain
6. Izzy Bryan
7. Julian and Rosie Elia
8. Logan Giancotti
9. Aidan Gowan
10. Jake Haines
11. Avigail Humphreys
12. Julian Kaan
13. Andronika Kelso
14. Jacob Khoe
15. Cassandra Kumah
16. Iris Kwon
17. Isaac Manshoong
18. Athena Matthews
19. Anthony and Shelby O'Coin
20. Johnathan On
21. Trevhon "TJ" and Tristan Samuel
22. Joshua Smith
23. Ethan Thomas
24. Isaiah Vassel
25. Ella Walcer

=== Season 3 ===
1. Maya Adamski
2. Jaeda Ahuja
3. Amiera Black
4. Hannah Dempster
5. Trinity Henry
6. Andrew Hill
7. Emily Lizano
8. Graeme Lloyd
9. Indiana López
10. Jacob Metcalfe
11. Aamil Moolla
12. Yasin Rehmanji
13. Christien Shepherd
14. Dillon Soin
15. Kendra Tapp-Perry
16. Tai Young

== Episodes ==
=== Season 1 (2006-2007) ===
1. Big Splash
2. Frogs Legs
3. Chloe and Horatio
4. Hop and Seek
5. Chloe and the Kite
6. Chloe and the Snowcast
7. Crab I Used to Be
8. 50 Leagues Under the Sea
9. The Secret Life of (Shaggy) Dogs
10. The Surprise Party
11. The Tortoise and the Crab
12. The Parade
13. The Camp Out
14. The Too Bright Moon
15. Ruckus Loves the Chase
16. Alice and the Case of the Strange Hiccups
17. George and the Big Wind
18. Animalympics
19. Egbert Learns to Fly
20. Boonana
21. George Saves Audrey
22. George Takes a Dive
23. Charlotte the Squirrel Finds a Snack
24. Egbert's Surprise
25. Teeth
26. A Nest in the Storm
27. Neck
28. It's Spring Time Bear!
29. Egbert and the Crocodile
30. Don't Wake Up the Sleeping Dino!
31. Royal Friends
32. A Water Play Day
33. The New Year's Eve Celebration
34. Getting the Jump
35. Getting Warmer
36. What's Making the Dinosaur Tremble
37. Looking Up
38. Giga's Egg
39. Audrey the Octopus (song)
40. Bear the Polar Bear (song)
41. Ruckus the Dog (song)
42. Chloe the Chicken (song)
43. How to Say Play
44. Halloween
45. Egbert the Lovebird (song)
46. Felix the Frog (song)
47. Charlotte the Squirrel (song)
48. Giga the Giganotosaurus (song)
49. What a Tangled Web We Weave
50. Alice the Elephant (song)
51. Horatio the Penguin (song)
52. Frank the Crab (song)

=== Season 2 (2008-2009) ===
1. Never Judge a Sloth by Its Cover
2. Lucy Finds a New Home
3. Jump for Joy
4. On the Defense
5. Shelley's Slow Adventure
6. Temper, Temper
7. Can I Pretend To Be You
8. Bal-loon
9. Home Ss-sweet Home
10. Arjun Builds a Dam
11. Coral the Zebra and the Meerkats from the Kalahari
12. Arjun's Big Storm
13. Lola and Ug
14. Sam Learns to Fly
15. Look Different
16. Albert Gets Ready for Winter
17. Albert and the Monsters
18. Loon and Tick
19. Birds of a Feather (song)
20. Pirates of the Amphibian
21. Sam and the Flying Club
22. Dance the Plank
23. Cameron Catches a Snack
24. The New Arrival
25. Lola and the Bracelet
26. A Show of Defense
27. Stuck in the Mud
28. Where's My Lunch?
29. Meerkat See, Meerkat Do
30. Mud Fight
31. Opposites Distract
32. Cameron Cha Cha Cha's
33. Praying Mantis Says... Roll Play!
34. Tabitha and Her New Noise
35. Stanley the Skunk (song)
36. Albert the Ant (song)
37. The Morning Band
38. Arjun the Beaver (song)
39. Manny the Tasmanian Devil (song)
40. Do the Robot (song)
41. Louie the Loon (song)
42. Lola the Mermaid (song)
43. Tabitha the Cricket (song)
44. Marvin the Meerkat (song)
45. Anthem Song (Can I Pretend To Be You)
46. Centipede Sisters (song)
47. Lucy the Woodpecker (song)
48. Cameron the Chameleon (song)
49. Frances the Pig (song)
50. Michelle the Hammerhead Shark (song)
51. Sam the Pterodactyl (song)
52. Shelley the Tortoise (song)

=== Season 3 (2012-2013) ===
1. Peacock Party
2. Furry the Flying Squirrel
3. Ulysses the Unicorn
4. Lila the Ladybug
5. Zebra Song
6. Hamster Song
7. Happy Capybara
8. Toto the Komodo
9. Gus the Grasshopper
10. Dolly the Dolphin
11. Harry the Hedgehog
12. Harriet the Hummingbird
13. Fly Like a Dragon
14. Jippy Dog
15. Busy the Bee
16. Ella the Electric Eel
17. Patty the Platypus
18. Welcome
19. Animal Band
20. Animal Party
21. Regina: Concert Special
22. Kitchener: Concert Special
23. Toronto 1: Concert Special
24. Toronto 2: Concert Special
