= List of Rusty Rivets episodes =

Rusty Rivets is a Canadian 3D CGI animated television series produced by Arc Productions and Spin Master Entertainment for Treehouse TV and Nickelodeon. Inspired by elements of the maker culture, it follows the adventures of a young inventor named Rusty and his team of customized robots.

Twenty-six episodes for the first season were confirmed. On May 24, 2017, it was renewed for a second season. On May 22, 2018, it was renewed for a third and final season.

== Series overview ==
Season	Segments	Episodes	Originally released	
Season	Segments	Episodes	First released	Last released
1	52	26	November 8, 2016	December 15, 2017
2	49	26	January 9, 2018	June 1, 2019
3	49	26	March 2, 2020	May 8, 2020

== Season 1 (2016–17) ==
No. overall	No. in season	Title	Directed by	Written by	Original release date	Canadian air date	Prod. code	U.S. viewers (millions)
1a	1a	"Rusty's Rex Rescue"	Brad Ferguson	Andy Guerdat	November 8, 2016	16 January 2017	101	1.10
Rusty must come to the rescue when his friend gets trapped on top of a stack of junk in the recycling yard.
1b	1b	"Rusty's Park N' Fly"	Brad Ferguson	John May and Suzanne Bolch	November 8, 2016	16 January 2017	101	1.10
Rusty and his friends must bring Mr. Higgins' remote control plane down safely.
2a	2a	"Rusty Digs In"	Rick Marshall	Ravi Steve	November 9, 2016	17 January 2017	107	1.05
When the key to the city goes missing, everyone assumes Botasaur buried it.
2b	2b	"Rusty's Brave Cave Save"	Rick Marshall	Anita Kapila	November 9, 2016	17 January 2017	107	1.05
When Sammy gets trapped in a cave while spelunking, Rusty saves the day with a big idea.
3a	3a	"Rusty Dives In"	Brad Ferguson	John May and Suzanne Bolch	November 10, 2016	17 January 2017	105	1.07
When Ruby's tablet winds up at the bottom of a lake, Rusty dives in to retrieve it.
3b	3b	"Rusty's Big Top Trouble"	Brad Ferguson	Mike McPhaden	November 10, 2016	17 January 2017	105	1.07
When the engine fails on a circus train, Rusty must figure out how to fix it before opening night
4a	4a	"Rusty Marks the Spot"	Brad Ferguson	Joe Purdy	November 11, 2016	17 January 2017	106	1.66
When Rusty finds an old pirate's map, he and the gang dig up more than just treasure.
4b	4b	"Rusty's Bits on the Fritz"	Brad Ferguson	Mike McPhaden	November 11, 2016	17 January 2017	106	1.66
The bits wander into Rusty's parts replicator.
5a	5a	"Rusty's Bit in the Woods"	Rick Marshall	Ravi Steve	November 15, 2016	17 January 2017	109	0.92
When Crush wanders off and is lost, Rusty invents a night flyer to find him in the dark.
5b	5b	"Rusty's Stuffy Toughy"	Rick Marshall	Nathalie Younglai	November 15, 2016	17 January 2017	109	0.92
Rusty goes on a retrieval mission when Liam loses his stuffy out the train window.
6a	6a	"Rusty Goes Bananas"	Brad Ferguson	John May, Suzanne Bolch and Bart Jannett	November 17, 2016	17 January 2017	108	0.71
When the monkeys escape from their Animal Park enclosure, Rusty must find a way to lead them back.
6b	6b	"Rusty's Night Lights"	Rick Marshall	John May and Suzanne Bolch	November 17, 2016	17 January 2017	108	0.71
The town's power goes out after Ruby takes Crush up for a plane flight.
7a	7a	"Rusty's Ski Trip Blip"	Brad Ferguson	Dustin Ferrer	December 9, 2016	17 January 2017	102	1.20
The group's ski trip is thwarted by a large rock pile on the way to Pliers Peak.
7b	7b	"Rusty and the Camp Bandit"	Brad Ferguson	Corey Powell	December 9, 2016	17 January 2017	102	1.20
Ruby and Rusty earn their camping badges.
8a	8a	"Ruby Rocks" "Rusty Rocks"	Brad Ferguson	John May and Suzanne Bolch	January 10, 2017	17 January 2017	104	1.11
Ruby Ramirez forms "Ruby and the Rustettes" to sing. This music recurs in episodes 15 and 16, showing they happen afterward.
8b	8b	"Rusty's Balloon Blast"	Brad Ferguson	John May and Suzanne Bolch	January 10, 2017	17 January 2017	104	1.11
Liam launches a giant balloon while inside the basket and Rusty and Ruby try to bring him back down.
9a	9a	"Rusty's Nest Friend Forever"	Rick Marshall	Aron Dunn	January 12, 2017	17 January 2017	110	1.03
Rusty sets out to help when a rare bird builds his nest in a dangerous location.
9b	9b	"Rusty's Flingbot"	Paul Brown	Jack Ferraiolo	January 12, 2017	17 January 2017	110	1.03
Rusty and Ruby build a cupcake flinging machine.
10a	10a	"Rusty's Penguin Problem"	Brad Ferguson	Mike Rabb	February 21, 2017	17 January 2017	103	1.02
Rusty and the gang need to get some penguins to the Nature Park on the hottest day of the year.
10b	10b	"Rusty's Sand Castle Hassle"	Brad Ferguson	John May and Suzanne Bolch	February 21, 2017	17 January 2017	103	1.02
When a seagull steals Liam's elaborate sand castle plans, Rusty and Ruby must retrieve them before the contest deadline
11a	11a	"Rusty's Space Bit"	Rick Marshall	Elize Morgan	February 23, 2017	3 April 2017	111	1.04
When the Bits find a satellite crashed in the scrap yard, Rusty has to find a way to get the satellite bit back home to space.
11b	11b	"Rusty and the Sneezing Fish"	Rick Marshall	Jay Vaidya	February 23, 2017	3 April 2017	111	1.04
Rusty and Ruby help Ranger Anna by transporting an ill Big Fish from the lake to the zoo so she can tend to its cold.
12a	12a	"Rusty's Water Works"	Rick Marshall	John May and Suzanne Bolch	March 10, 2017	3 April 2017	112	1.12
Higgins' asks Rusty to fix a leaky pipe. Rusty ends up breaking it and when they plug the leak with a beach ball, after turning off the water supply they have Botosaur (wearing mittens) transport it to the lake and drain it slowly using spouts.
12b	12b	"Rusty's Rubbish Race"	Paul Brown	Jack Ferraiolo	March 10, 2017	3 April 2017	112	1.12
Team Rusty and Team Ruby and Team Liam compete to see who can clean the most garbage off the beach. After more garbage washes ashore, Rusty makes a boat and Ruby makes a submarine and they dive into the water to collect more. Their lack of cooperation causes them to crash into one another, spilling all their garbage.
13a	13a	"Rusty In Liam Land"	Rick Marshall	John May and Suzanne Bolch	April 18, 2017	3 April 2017	113	0.93
When the theme park is closed for Liam's birthday and Higgins' gear crushes his tricycle, Rusty and Ruby use the junk to build him a custom ride.
13b	13b	"Rusty the Vacuum Kid"	Paul Brown	Ron Holsey	April 18, 2017	3 April 2017	113	0.93
Rusty and Ruby's machine's suction hose ends up affixing them to a bridge dangling above a ranging river. Liam comes to the rescue by attaching wings and a jet fan as R+R are helplessly stuck in a spin cycle.
14a	14a	"Rusty and Captain Scoops"	Rick Marshall	Clark Stubbs	April 20, 2017	3 April 2017	114	0.94
Sammy Scoops cannot compete with the speed of the Ice Cream Queen, so Rusty and Ruby build him a variety of devices to increase his service. Sammy ends up saving ICQ after her vehicle skids out of control. She says that her name is Samantha (nicknamed Sammy) and at the kids' suggestion, they merge their businesses, with Scoops making the cream while Samantha the "Cone Woman" does deliveries.
14b	14b	"Rusty's Creature Catcher"	Rick Marshall	John May and Suzanne Bolch, teleplay by Scott Gray	April 20, 2017	3 April 2017	114	0.94
Liam comes up with a comic called "Cave Dweller vs Monster Bot: The Battle for Sparkton Hills" which Ruby loves.
15a	15a	"Rusty Learns to Skate"	Paul Brown	Peggy Sarlin	December 15, 2017	4 July 2017	115	0.84
Rusty measures how thick the ice is and asks his friends to stay back while he fills the hole.
15b	15b	"Rusty's Rustic Adventure"	Paul Brown	Len Uhley	December 15, 2017	4 July 2017	115	0.84
16a	16a	"Rusty and the Mechanical Animal"	Paul Brown	Susan Kim	May 12, 2017	5 July 2017	116	1.07
Rusty and Ruby make Ranger Anna a robotic pet, but it goes haywire when they try to program it.
16b	16b	"Rusty's Spaceship"	Paul Brown	Susan Kim	May 12, 2017	5 July 2017	116	1.07
Rusty builds Liam a spaceship as a surprise, but instead of impressing him, it wreaks havoc on the town.
17a	17a	"Rusty and the Bit Police"	Rick Marshall	Mike McPhaden	May 9, 2017	6 July 2017	117	0.76
Officer Carl needs to be in too many places at the same time, so he deputizes the Bits to help him out.
17b	17b	"Rusty's Jam at the Dam"	Rick Marshall	John May and Suzanne Bolch	May 9, 2017	6 July 2017	117	0.76
When Rusty and his friends discover that a beaver has not been able to repair its dam, they decide to help fix the dam before it collapses.
18a	18a	"Rusty's Bota-Fort"	Rick Marshall	Matt Fleckenstein	August 1, 2017	July 7, 2017	118	1.00
18b	18b	"Rusty's Bull-Dozer"	Paul Brown	Len Uhley	August 1, 2017	July 7, 2017	118	1.00
19a	19a	"Rusty's Alien Invasion"	Rick Marshall	Jen Skelly and Scott Gray	October 17, 2017	July 8, 2017	119	0.87
The Alien Queen calls Rusty & Ruby for a Space Mission.
19b	19b	"Rusty's Running Car"	Paul Brown	Jen Skelly and Jack Ferraiolo	October 17, 2017	July 8, 2017	119	0.87
Sammy Scoops calls Ruby and Rusty for help.
20a	20a	"Rusty Feels Peachy"	Paul Brown	Scott Gray	August 3, 2017	July 9, 2017	120	1.10
20b	20b	"Rusty's Monkey Mayhem"	Rick Marshall	Ron Holsey	August 3, 2017	July 9, 2017	120	1.10
21a	21a	"Rusty's Pet Project"	Paul Brown	Scott Gray	September 12, 2017	September 25, 2017	121	0.82
21b	21b	"Rusty Gets Stuck"	Paul Brown	Matt Fleckenstein	September 12, 2017	September 25, 2017	121	0.82
22a	22a	"Rusty's Mysterious Mystery"	Paul Brown	Susan Kim	September 14, 2017	September 26, 2017	122	0.85
22b	22b	"Rusty's Yard-Cade Game"	Paul Brown	Scott Gray	September 14, 2017	September 26, 2017	122	0.85
23a	23a	"Rusty's Spooky Adventure"	Rick Marshall	Ron Holsey	October 19, 2017	September 27, 2017	123	0.81
23b	23b	"Rusty Loses the Bits"	Rick Marshall	Clark Stubbs	October 19, 2017	September 27, 2017	123	0.81
24a	24a	"Rusty's Dancing Suit"	Paul Brown	Kati Rocky	October 31, 2017	September 29, 2017	125	0.61
24b	24b	"Rusty Bee Good"	Paul Brown	Clark Stubbs and Peter Hunziker	October 31, 2017	September 29, 2017	125	0.61
25a	25a	"Rusty's Plant Perdicament"	Rick Marshall	Susan Kim	November 2, 2017	September 28, 2017	126	0.77
25b	25b	"Rusty's Beach Day Delay"	Paul Brown	Jim Nolan	November 2, 2017	September 28, 2017	126	0.77
26a	26a	"Rusty's Kitty Catastrophe"	Rick Marshall	Peter Hunziker	November 22, 2017	October 2, 2017	124	1.05
26b	26b	"Robo Rusty"	Rick Marshall	Len Uhley	November 22, 2017	October 2, 2017	124	1.05

== Season 2 (2018–19) ==
The second season premiered on January 9, 2018 in the United States.

No. overall	No. in season	Title	Directed by	Written by	Original release date	Canadian air date	Prod. code	U.S. viewers (millions)
27a	1a	"Ruby's Comet Adventure"	Paul Brown	Rick Suvalle	January 9, 2018	February 10, 2018	201	0.87
27b	1b	"Rusty's Messy Mishap"	Paul Brown	Len Uhley	January 9, 2018	February 10, 2018	201	0.87
28	2	"Rusty's Mobile Rivet Lab"	Paul Brown	Cynthia Riddle and Peter Hunziker	January 11, 2018	February 11, 2018	202	0.73
29a	3a	"Rusty's Piggy Bank Heist"	Paul Brown	Ron Holsey	January 23, 2018	February 18, 2018	204	0.85
The bits accidentally turn Rusty's robotic piggy bank into a wild runaway robo-boar, so Rusty, Ruby and the bits must to catch her and turn her back to normal.
29b	3b	"Rusty's Whale of a Trouble"	Paul Brown	Dan Danko	January 23, 2018	February 18, 2018	204	0.85
30a	4a	"Rusty's Monkey Business"	Paul Brown	Susan Kim	January 25, 2018	February 17, 2018	203	0.86
30b	4b	"Rusty's Snow Trouble"	Paul Brown	Peter Hunziker	January 25, 2018	February 17, 2018	203	0.86
31a	5a	"Frankie's Botasaur"	Paul Brown	Peter Hunziker and Susan Kim	March 27, 2018	April 15, 2018	205	1.00
Frankie, Rusty, and Ruby's new neighbor, programs Botasaur to behave like a frog, then a mountain goat, and then like a mega dinosaur.
31b	5b	"Rusty's Mega Stacker"	Paul Brown	Cynthia Riddle	March 27, 2018	April 15, 2018	205	1.00
32a	6a	"Fix It 500"	Paul Brown	Rick Suvalle	April 10, 2018	June 3, 2018	206	0.68
32b	6b	"Ice Ice Rusty"	Paul Brown	Evan Sinclair	April 10, 2018	June 3, 2018	206	0.68
33a	7a	"Rusty vs. the Robo-Squirrel"	Paul Brown	Ron Holsey	April 12, 2018	June 10, 2018	207	0.59
33b	7b	"Rusty's Day of the Drones"	Paul Brown	Ron Holsey	April 12, 2018	June 10, 2018	207	0.59
34a	8a	"Rusty and the Pirates of Sparkton Hills"	Paul Brown	Jim Nolan	April 20, 2018	April 29, 2018	208	0.81
34b	8b	"Rusty and the Mouse Trouble"	Paul Brown	Susan Kim	April 20, 2018	April 29, 2018	208	0.81
35a	9a	"Rusty and the Birthday Surprise"	Paul Brown	Cynthia Riddle	May 8, 2018	June 17, 2018	210	0.59
35b	9b	"Rusty's Ninja Fish Rescue"	Paul Brown	Cynthia Riddle	May 8, 2018	June 17, 2018	210	0.59
36a	10a	"Rusty's Relaxing Recliner"	Paul Brown	Matt Fleckenstein	May 10, 2018	June 24, 2018	209	0.68
36b	10b	"Rusty and the Stinky Situation"	Paul Brown	Evan Sinclair	May 10, 2018	June 24, 2018	209	0.68
37a	11a	"Rusty's Runaway Sled"	Paul Brown	Peter Hunziker	June 12, 2018	August 12, 2018	212	0.90
37b	11b	"Rusty's Sky Pie Delivery"	Paul Brown	Matt Fleckenstein	June 12, 2018	August 12, 2018	212	0.90
38a	12a	"Rusty's Show Must Go On"	Paul Brown	Evan Sinclair	June 14, 2018	August 5, 2018	211	0.74
38b	12b	"Rusty and the S'more Snatcher"	Paul Brown	Lisa Kettle	June 14, 2018	August 5, 2018	211	0.74
39a	13a	"Rusty's Sick Fix"	Paul Brown	Rick Suvalle	July 10, 2018	August 19, 2018	213	0.83
39b	13b	"Rusty's Journey to the Center of Sparkton Hills"	Paul Brown	Jim Nolan	July 10, 2018	August 19, 2018	213	0.83
40a	14a	"Rusty's Walk on the Small Side"	Paul Brown	Lisa Kettle	July 12, 2018	August 26, 2018	215	0.95
40b	14b	"Liam Gets Birdnapped"	Paul Brown	Chara Campanella	July 12, 2018	August 26, 2018	215	0.95
41a	15a	"Super Rusty vs. Super Villain Bot"	Paul Brown	Cynthia Riddle	August 17, 2018	October 7, 2018	214	0.89
41b	15b	"Rusty in Space"	Paul Brown	Dan Danko	August 17, 2018	October 7, 2018	214	0.89
42a	16a	"Rusty's Dino Coaster"	Paul Brown	Peter Hunziker	September 14, 2018	October 14, 2018	218	0.54
42b	16b	"Rusty's Teacher Appreciation Day"	Paul Brown	Cynthia Riddle	September 14, 2018	October 14, 2018	218	0.54
43a	17a	"Rusty and the Heroic Helpers"	Paul Brown	Susan Kim	October 2, 2018	November 11, 2018	216	0.70
43b	17b	"Rusty's Monkey Rescue"	Paul Brown	Cynthia Riddle	October 2, 2018	November 11, 2018	216	0.70
44a	18a	"A Pet for Liam"	Paul Brown	Laura Kleinbaum	October 4, 2018	November 18, 2018	219	0.64
44b	18b	"Rusty's Dome Trouble"	Paul Brown	Rick Suvalle	October 4, 2018	November 18, 2018	219	0.64
45	19	"Rusty Saves Christmas"	Paul Brown	Peter Hunziker	December 8, 2018	December 16, 2018	220	0.65
46	20	"Rusty and the Temple of Boom Is Closed Save"	Paul Brown	Peter Hunziker	January 26, 2019	March 10, 2019	217	0.51
47a	21a	"Rusty's Bubble Trouble"	Paul Brown	Evan Sinclair	February 16, 2019	March 17, 2019	221	0.43
47b	21b	"Rusty's Runaway Sub"	Paul Brown	Dan Danko	February 16, 2019	March 17, 2019	221	0.43
48a	22a	"Rusty's Roller Rescue"	Paul Brown	Ron Holsey	March 2, 2019	March 24, 2019	222	0.55
48b	22b	"Knight Time for Rusty"	Paul Brown	Rachel Graham	March 2, 2019	March 24, 2019	222	0.55
Frankie tries to steal magnetic skyptar, and hardly success. But can Rusty, Ruby and Liam stop him? Note: This is the final episode to feature Botasaur until "Rusty's Arctic Adventure".
49a	23a	"Rusty's Elephant Escape"	Paul Brown	Matt Fleckenstein	March 30, 2019	March 31, 2019	223	0.42
49b	23b	"Rusty and the Flying Skunk"	Paul Brown	Becky Wangberg and Sarah Eisenberg	March 30, 2019	March 31, 2019	223	0.42
50a	24a	"Rusty and the Floating School"	Paul Brown	Marc Seal	April 27, 2019	June 16, 2019	224	0.44
50b	24b	"Rusty vs. Mega Frankford"	Paul Brown	Dan Danko	April 27, 2019	June 16, 2019	224	0.44
51a	25a	"Rusty's Arctic Adventure"	Paul Brown	Dan Danko	May 11, 2019	June 23, 2019	226	0.43
51b	25b	"Super Liam"	Paul Brown	Peter Hunziker	May 11, 2019	June 23, 2019	226	0.43
52a	26a	"Secret Agent Rusty"	Paul Brown	Patrick Rieger	June 1, 2019	June 30, 2019	225	0.43
52b	26b	"Moon Walkin' Rusty"	Paul Brown	Scott Albert	June 1, 2019	June 30, 2019	225	0.43

== Season 3 (2020) ==
No. overall	No. in season	Title	Directed by	Written by	Original release date	Canadian air date	Prod. code	U.S. viewers (millions)
53	1	"Rusty's Dino Island"	Paul Brown	Scott Gray	March 2, 2020	July 7, 2019	301	0.27
54a	2a	"Rusty's Tiny Adventure"	Paul Brown	Becky Wangberg and Sarah Eisenberg	March 3, 2020	July 14, 2019	302	0.36
54b	2b	"Rusty's Warm Winter Games"	Paul Brown	Lisa Akhurst and Marc Seal	March 3, 2020	July 14, 2019	302	0.36
55a	3a	"Rusty's Raptor Race"	Paul Brown	Evan Sinclair	March 4, 2020	July 21, 2019	303	0.30
55b	3b	"Rusty's Triceratops"	Paul Brown	Peter Hunziker	March 4, 2020	July 21, 2019	303	0.30
56a	4a	"Frankie's Super Shoes"	Paul Brown	Susan Kim	March 5, 2020	July 28, 2019	304	0.34
56b	4b	"Rusty's Rapid Ralph Return"	Paul Brown	Peter Hunziker	March 5, 2020	July 28, 2019	304	0.34
57a	5a	"Rusty and the Search for Ozzy"	Paul Brown	Becky Wangberg and Sarah Eisenberg	March 6, 2020	November 3, 2019	305	0.37
57b	5b	"Rusty's Dactyl Dilemma"	Paul Brown	Rachel Graham	March 6, 2020	November 3, 2019	305	0.37
58a	6a	"Detective Rusty"	Paul Brown	Cynthia Riddle	April 13, 2020	November 10, 2019	306	0.33
58b	6b	"Rusty's Chilling Rescue"	Paul Brown	Dan Danko	April 13, 2020	November 10, 2019	306	0.33
59a	7a	"Rusty's Treasure Island"	Paul Brown	Jeff Wynne	April 14, 2020	November 17, 2019	307	0.42
59b	7b	"Rusty's Raptor-Sitting"	Paul Brown	Lisa Akhurst and Marc Seal	April 14, 2020	November 17, 2019	307	0.42
60a	8a	"Liam's Caterpillar Calamity"	Paul Brown	Evan Sinclair	April 15, 2020	November 24, 2019	308	0.35
60b	8b	"Rusty's Birthday Round-Up"	Paul Brown	Susan Kim	April 15, 2020	November 24, 2019	308	0.35
61a	9a	"Rusty's Meteor Madness"	Paul Brown	Patrick Rieger	April 16, 2020	December 1, 2019	309	0.33
61b	9b	"Rusty's Dino for a Day"	Paul Brown	Ken Pontac	April 16, 2020	December 1, 2019	309	0.33
62a	10a	"Large Liam"	Paul Brown	Lisa Akhurst and Marc Seal	April 17, 2020	December 8, 2019	310	0.43
62b	10b	"Rusty's Hike Hijinks"	Paul Brown	Rachel Graham	April 17, 2020	December 8, 2019	310	0.43
63a	11a	"Ozzy Gets Trapped"	Paul Brown	Dan Danko	April 20, 2020	December 15, 2019	311	0.37
63b	11b	"Rusty's Island Mystery"	Paul Brown	Patrick Rieger	April 20, 2020	December 15, 2019	311	0.37
64a	12a	"Rusty and the Elephant Express"	Paul Brown	Evan Sinclair	April 21, 2020	December 22, 2019	312	0.37
64b	12b	"Rusty and Ruby on the Fritz"	Paul Brown	Andrew Blanchette	April 21, 2020	December 22, 2019	312	0.37
65	13	"Rusty's Stegobot"	Paul Brown	Peter Hunziker	April 22, 2020	January 25, 2020	313	0.34
66a	14a	"Rusty's Hide-and-Ghost-Seek"	Paul Brown	Andrew Blanchette	April 23, 2020	October 27, 2019	314	0.37
66b	14b	"Rusty's Halloween Hero"	Paul Brown	Eva Konstantopoulos	April 23, 2020	October 27, 2019	314	0.37
67a	15a	"Rusty's Franken Monster Truck"	Paul Brown	Peter Hunziker	April 24, 2020	January 5, 2020	315	0.40
67b	15b	"Rusty's Adventures in Blobbositting"	Paul Brown	Dan Danko	April 24, 2020	January 5, 2020	315	0.40
68a	16a	"Rusty's Raptor Crossing"	Paul Brown	Patrick Rieger	April 27, 2020	January 12, 2020	316	0.37
68b	16b	"Rusty's Dinosaur Snow Day"	Paul Brown	Jeff Wynne	April 27, 2020	January 12, 2020	316	0.37
69a	17a	"Rusty's Floating Adventure"	Paul Brown	Cynthia Riddle	April 28, 2020	January 19, 2020	317	0.36
69b	17b	"Rusty's Hoppy Day"	Paul Brown	Evan Sinclair	April 28, 2020	January 19, 2020	317	0.36
70a	18a	"Ozzy's Snooze Cruise"	Paul Brown	Liam Farrell	April 29, 2020	January 26, 2020	318	0.33
70b	18b	"Rusty's Diamond Drama"	Paul Brown	Evan Sinclair	April 29, 2020	January 26, 2020	318	0.33
71a	19a	"Rusty and the Flying Pirate Monkeys"	Paul Brown	Jorge Aguirre	April 30, 2020	February 2, 2020	319	0.43
71b	19b	"Rusty's Delivery Day"	Paul Brown	Andrew Blanchette	April 30, 2020	February 2, 2020	319	0.43
72a	20a	"Rusty's Founder's Day Frenzy"	Paul Brown	Jeff Wynne	May 1, 2020	February 9, 2020	320	0.43
72b	20b	"Rusty's Giga-Bytes"	Paul Brown	Peter Hunziker	May 1, 2020	February 9, 2020	320	0.43
73a	21a	"Rusty's Triceratops Trouble"	Paul Bouchard	Hanah Lee Cook	May 4, 2020	February 16, 2020	321	0.32
73b	21b	"Rusty's Pendant Problem"	Dipesh Mistry	Jeff Wynne	May 4, 2020	February 16, 2020	321	0.32
74a	22a	"Frankie's Baseball Bot" "Rusty's Baseball Bot"	Paul Bouchard	Becky Wangberg and Sarah Eisenberg	May 5, 2020	February 23, 2020	322	0.33
74b	22b	"Rusty's Giant Toy Trouble"	Dipesh Mistry	Andrew Blanchette	May 5, 2020	February 23, 2020	322	0.33
75a	23a	"Frankie's Fritz Bits"	Paul Bouchard	Peter Hunziker	May 6, 2020	April 12, 2020	323	0.30
75b	23b	"Rusty's Ice Cream Day Disaster"	Dipesh Mistry	Hanah Lee Cook	May 6, 2020	April 12, 2020	323	0.30
76a	24a	"Rusty's Giraffe Journey"	Paul Bouchard	Jeff Wynne	May 7, 2020	April 19, 2020	324	0.40
76b	24b	"Rusty's Construction Chaos"	Dipesh Mistry	Matt Fleckenstein	May 7, 2020	April 19, 2020	324	0.40
77a	25a	"Whole Lava Trouble"	Paul Bouchard	Dan Danko	May 8, 2020	April 26, 2020	325	0.41
77b	25b	"Rusty's Missing Mom Adventure"	Dipesh Mistry	Jeff Wynne	May 8, 2020	April 26, 2020	325	0.41
78	26	"Rusty vs. the Dino Invasion"	Paul Brown	Peter Hunziker	May 8, 2020	May 3, 2020	326	0.39
