= Rusty Rivets =

Canadian children's animated television series

- Genre: Comedy Action Science fiction
- Created by: Joshua Fisher; Michael O'Hare
- Developed by: Andy Guerdat
- Directed by: Paul Brown (season 2)
- Voices of: Kyle Harrison Breitkopf; Ava Preston; Rob Tinkler; Julie Lemieux; Ron Pardo
- Theme music composer: Peter Zizzo
- Country of origin: Canada
- Original language: English
- No. of seasons: 3
- No. of episodes: 78 (151 segments) (list of episodes)

Production
- Executive producers: Ronnen Harary; Laura Clunie
- Producers: Bart Jennett; David Sharples
- Running time: 22 minutes (11 minutes per segment)
- Production companies: Spin Master Entertainment; Nickelodeon Productions

Original release
- Network: Nickelodeon (United States); Treehouse TV (Canada)
- Release: November 8, 2016 – May 8, 2020

Rusty Rivets is a Canadian animated children's television series, and is produced by Spin Master Entertainment for Nickelodeon. The series aired for three seasons, simultaneously on Treehouse TV in Canada and on Nickelodeon in the United States from November 8, 2016, to May 8, 2020. Inspired by elements of the maker culture, it follows the adventures of a young inventor named Rusty and his team of customized robots.

The first season was the last animated project of Arc Productions before it was absorbed into Jam Filled Entertainment in August 2016.

== Plot ==
A young boy named Rusty Rivets uses his knowledge of engineering to repurpose machine parts and create gadgets. He lives in the fictional town city of Sparkton Hills in a futuristic Canada along with his best friend Ruby Ramirez, a robotic tyrannosaurid named Botasaur, and a group of smaller robots known as the Bits. The show highlights a variety of concepts related to basic science and technology.

Rusty uses the recurring catch phrase "modify, customize, Rustify" when personalizing inventions. Ruby changes the last word to "Rubify" when she does the alterations (only twice in Rusty and the Mechanical Animal and Rusty's Spooky Adventure), and Liam changes the last word to "Liamify" when he does it (only once in Rusty the Vacuum Kid).

== Episodes ==
Season	Segments	Episodes	Originally released	
Season	Segments	Episodes	First released	Last released
1	52	26	November 8, 2016	December 15, 2017
2	49	26	January 9, 2018	June 1, 2019
3	49	26	March 2, 2020	May 8, 2020

== Characters ==
=== Main ===
- Rusty Rivets (voiced by Kyle Harrison Breitkopf) is an engineer. He has his own mobile laboratory, which is based in a recycling yard. He is the great great grandson of Ruston Rivets IV, which Ruby guesses hearing the number, indicating he is Ruston Rivets VIII, although there are conflicting ideas about the name of Ruston Rivets IV, since in Season 3, Rusty also called him Mortimer Rivets.
- Ruby Ramirez (voiced by Ava Preston) is Rusty's best friend who normally carries a tablet computer that she uses to call the Bits into action. Ruby wears a red sash with white dots around her head, reminiscent of Rosie the Riveter.
- Frankie Fritz (voiced by Jacob Skiba) is Rusty and Ruby's rival, arch-enemy and neighbor, using every opportunity he can to try and upstage Rusty and be the best engineer in Sparkton Hills, even resorting to cheating to accomplish it.
- Frankford is Frankie's robotic skunk, best friend and counterpart to Bytes. He helps Frankie in his attempts to put Rusty out of action.
- Bytes (voiced by Robert Tinkler) is Rusty's robotic dog, who communicates by barking. He generally does not take part in missions.
- Kittybot is Ruby's robotic cat, who communicates by meowing. She can sit down.
- Ray (voiced by Robert Tinkler) is a small, red-coloured member of the Bits with a single eye that functions as a flashlight.
- Whirly (voiced by Julie Lemieux) is a pink Bit who resembles a hummingbird. She has a pair of wings and a propeller on her head.
- Crush (voiced by Julie Lemieux) is an orange Bit made from a clamp, who can crush and hold small objects.
- Jack (voiced by Ron Pardo) is a blue, cube-shaped Bit who can lift and transport objects using his forklift-like arms.
- Botasaur (voiced by Robert Tinkler) is the tallest member of Rusty's team, modeled after Tyrannosaurus rex. He is Rusty's sidekick.
- Botarilla (voiced by Andrew Jackson) is Rusty's robotic gorilla, who can climb on trees and swing on vines.
- TigerBot (voiced by Nicki Burke) is Rusty's robotic tiger, who can climb with her tiger claws.
- ElephantBot (voiced by Scott Jackson) is Rusty's robotic elephant, who can spray water on his trumpet.
- Dak (voiced by Jonathan Wilson) is Rusty's robotic Pterodactylus.
- Spike (voiced by Sergio Di Zio) is Rusty's robotic Triceratops.
- Velocity (voiced by Shoshana Sperling) is Rusty's robotic Velociraptor.
- Steggie (voiced by Leigh Cameron) is Rusty's robotic Stegosaurus.
- Brawny (voiced by Martin Roach) is Rusty's robotic Brachiosaurus.

=== Recurring ===
- Liam (voiced by Endeavour Clutterbuck) is a young blonde-haired boy who often needs rescuing.
- Emily (voiced by Aaliyah Cinello) is a young girl introduced in Season 2, who is a friend of Liam.
- Ranger Anna (voiced by Helen King) is a redheaded animal enthusiast in charge of the Sparkton Hills Scouts which Rusty and Ruby are part of.
- Betty (voiced by Novie Edwards in season 1 and Nicole Stamp in seasons 2–3) is a culinary expert (season 1) and later a teacher at the school where Rusty, Ruby, and Frankie go to (seasons 2–3).
- Sammy Scoops (voiced by Joshua Graham) is an ice cream vendor.
- Samantha (aka Cream Queen and Cone Woman) (voiced by Katie Griffin) shares the nickname "Sammy". They go into business together in "Captain Scoops" and are shown playing soccer together in "Rusty's Spaceship".
- Mr. Higgins (voiced by James Rankin) is the first inventor in town who inspired Rusty.
- Officer Carl (voiced by Jonathan Potts) is the only police officer in Sparkton Hills.
- Mrs. Rivets (voiced by Katie Griffin) is Rusty's mother.
- Mrs. McCloud is Liam's mother.
- Mr. McCloud (voiced by Martin Roach) is Liam's father.
- Ollie (voiced by Vas Saranga) is Ozzy's brother from Dino Island.
- Ozzy (voiced by Zach Smadu) is Ollie's brother from Dino Island.
- Orbit is a satellite after he crashed into the ground and Rusty launched him back into space.
- Frankasaurus (voiced by Ian Ho) is Frankie's former younger robot dinosaur brother.
- Robo-Squirrel is Mr. Higgins' robotic squirrel who can destroy things by taking nuts out.
- Chompers (voiced by Andrew Sabiston) is a beaver who can wag with her beaver tail.

== Production ==
Rusty Rivets began development in late 2014. The concept was originally pitched to Guru Studio, which ultimately chose not to develop the show. The first season was produced in accordance with Spin Master's policy to work on 1-2 television programs a year. It is Spin Master's sixth animated television venture. Twenty-six episodes have been confirmed.

Most of the first season's episodes were animated by Arc Productions in Toronto, Ontario. The studio closed on August 2, 2016, but its assets have been sold to the Ottawa-based company Jam Filled Entertainment, and the business reopened on August 22, 2016, as Jam Filled Toronto.

On May 24, 2017, it was renewed for a second season. On May 22, 2018, it was renewed for a third season.

== Release ==
The series was announced at Nickelodeon's upfront presentation in New York City on March 2, 2016. It was originally slated to premiere in the United States on August 22, 2016, but it was pushed back to November 8, 2016. The first season was going to air on Treehouse TV in Canada throughout fall 2016, but it was delayed until January 16, 2017. Spin Master distributes the series and its product line globally. The series premiered on Nick Jr. in Israel on February 12, 2017.

As of December 2018, new episodes moved to the Nick Jr. channel.

== Home media ==
On June 11, 2016, the first episode was released to Amazon Video as a free preview. The same episode was released to Nickelodeon's mobile platforms on June 20, 2016.

Nickelodeon and Paramount Home Entertainment released the DVD of the show on July 31, 2018.

== Merchandise ==
Spin Master has announced that it will distribute a line of toys based on the program. The company released them in fall 2017.

== Lawsuit ==
In 2019, an author sued Spin Master, claiming Rusty Rivets infringe the copyrights of 20-year-old comic book. Eventually Spin Master won when the judge declared that the TV series and comic book are not too similar.
