= Are We There Yet?: World Adventure =

American television sitcom (2010–2013)

- Genre: Children's; Travel
- Created by: J. J. Johnson
- Presented by: various
- Opening theme: "Send Me On My Way" performed by Rusted Root
- Countries of origin: Canada; United States
- Original language: English
- No. of seasons: 3
- No. of episodes: 119

Production
- Running time: 7-30 minutes

Original release
- Network: Treehouse TV; Kids' CBC
- Release: September 3, 2007 – October 27, 2011

Are We There Yet?: World Adventure is a children's television show created by J. J. Johnson that features real-life siblings exploring the world. The series could be seen in 7 or 30-minute formats. The series premiered on Monday, September 3, 2007 on Treehouse TV. Are We There Yet?: World Adventure is produced by Sinking Ship Entertainment in association with National Geographic Kids Entertainment and UNICEF.

== Cast ==
Each episode is presented by a pair of siblings. The presenters are:

- Julian and Rosie Elia (yellow and red)
- Molly and Sam Raymond (blue and green)
- Joanna and Julia Alphonso (red and blue)
- TJ and Tristan Samuel (green and yellow)
- Charlie and Gabriel Zeifman (blue and red)
- Hillary and Emily Lizano (yellow and green)
- Jessica and Jake Dean (red and yellow)
- Rehan and Aamil Moolla (green and blue)

== Episode list ==
Season	Episode #	Title	Featuring	Original Air Date
1	1	Mexico - Pyramid	Molly and Sam	September 3, 2007
1	2	Mexico - Mexican Town	Molly and Sam	September 4, 2007
1	3	Mexico - Animals	Molly and Sam	September 5, 2007
1	4	England - Animal Park	Julian and Rosie	September 6, 2007
1	5	England - Big Ben	Julian and Rosie	September 7, 2007
1	6	England - Garden Maze	Julian and Rosie	September 10, 2007
1	7	France - Medieval Fair	Julian and Rosie	September 11, 2007
1	8	France - Amusement Park	Julian and Rosie	September 12, 2007
1	9	France - Eiffel Tower	Julian and Rosie	September 12, 2007
1	10	Canada - Halloween, Montreal	Molly and Sam	September 13, 2007
1	11	Canada - Polar Bear Spotting	Molly and Sam	September 13, 2007
1	12	Canada - Dog Sledding	Molly and Sam	September 14, 2007
1	13	Ukraine - Easter Eggs	Molly and Sam	September 17, 2007
1	14	Ukraine - Dancing and Puppets	Molly and Sam	September 17, 2007
1	15	Canada - Algonquin Animal Rescue	Molly and Sam	September 18, 2007
1	16	Germany - Downhill Skiing	Julian and Rosie	September 19, 2007
1	17	Germany - Christmas Market	Julian and Rosie	September 20, 2007
1	18	Germany - Fairytale castle	Julian and Rosie	September 21, 2007
1	19	U.S.A. - United Nations	Julian and Rosie	September 24, 2007
1	20	Kenya - Rhino	Julian and Rosie	September 27, 2007
1	21	Kenya - Samburu Tribe	Julian and Rosie	September 28, 2007
1	22	Kenya - UNICEF School	Julian and Rosie	October 2, 2007
1	23	Kenya - Elephants	Julian and Rosie	October 4, 2007
1	24	Kenya - Giraffes	Julian and Rosie	October 18, 2007
1	25	Peru - Land of the Llamas	Julian and Rosie	October 27, 2007
1	26	Peru - Festival	Julian and Rosie	October 28, 2007
1	27	Peru - Machu Picchu	Julian and Rosie	December 2, 2007
1	28	Costa Rica - Animal Rescue	Molly and Sam	December 16, 2007
1	29	Costa Rica - Zip Line	Molly and Sam	December 23, 2007
1	30	Costa Rica - Rafting	Molly and Sam	January 8, 2008
1	31	India - Taj Mahal	Julian and Rosie	January 9, 2008
1	32	India - Safari	Julian and Rosie	January 9, 2008
1	33	India - Holi	Julian and Rosie	January 10, 2008
1	34	Thailand - Bangkok	Molly and Sam	January 11, 2008
1	35	Thailand - Songkran	Molly and Sam	January 22, 2008
1	36	Thailand - Tigers	Molly and Sam	January 25, 2008
1	37	U.S.A. - Old West	Julian and Rosie	January 28, 2008
1	38	U.S.A. - New York Museum	Julian and Rosie	January 28, 2008
1	39	Canada - Canada Day	Molly and Sam	February 6, 2008
1	40	Canada - Black Bears	Molly and Sam	February 11, 2008
2	41	U.S.A. (Hawaii) - Volcano	Julian and Rosie	March 6, 2008
2	42	U.S.A. (Hawaii) - Submarine	Julian and Rosie	March 9, 2008
2	43	U.S.A. (Hawaii) - Surfing	Julian and Rosie	March 11, 2008
2	44	Sweden - Vasa Museum	Molly and Sam	March 16, 2008
2	45	Sweden - Seals	Molly and Sam	April 12, 2008
2	46	Sweden - Sailboat Race	Molly and Sam	April 13, 2008
2	47	Sweden - Troubadour	Molly and Sam	May 24, 2008
2	48	Iceland - Vikings	Molly and Sam	July 5, 2008
2	49	Iceland - Natural Wonders	Molly and Sam	July 14, 2008
2	50	Iceland - Puffins	Molly and Sam	September 2, 2008
2	51	Italy - Sculptures	Julian and Rosie	September 2, 2008
2	52	Italy - Gladiators	Julian and Rosie	September 3, 2008
2	53	Italy - Leaning Tower	Julian and Rosie	September 3, 2008
2	54	Italy - Soccer	Julian and Rosie	September 4, 2008
2	55	Italy - Gondola	Julian and Rosie	September 4, 2008
2	56	Canada - Water Falls	TJ and Tristan	September 4, 2008
2	57	Turkey - Sugar Festival	TJ and Tristan	September 5, 2008
2	58	Turkey - Blue Mosque	TJ and Tristan	September 5, 2008
2	59	Turkey - Turkish Bath	TJ and Tristan	September 8, 2008
2	60	Turkey - Hot Air Balloon	TJ and Tristan	September 8, 2008
2	61	Egypt - Mummies	Joanna and Julia	September 9, 2008
2	62	Egypt - Pyramids	Joanna and Julia	September 9, 2008
2	63	Egypt - Nile River	Joanna and Julia	September 9, 2008
2	64	Egypt - Animals	Joanna and Julia	September 10, 2008
2	65	Russia - Winter	TJ and Tristan	September 10, 2008
2	66	Russia - Father Frost	TJ and Tristan	September 11, 2008
2	67	Russia - Ballet	TJ and Tristan	September 11, 2008
2	68	New Zealand - Maori	TJ and Tristan	September 11, 2008
2	69	New Zealand - Kiwi	TJ and Tristan	September 12, 2008
2	70	New Zealand - Glowworms	TJ and Tristan	September 12, 2008
2	71	New Zealand - Boats	TJ and Tristan	September 14, 2008
2	72	China - Pandas	Joanna and Julia	September 15, 2008
2	73	China - The Great Wall	Joanna and Julia	September 15, 2008
2	74	China - Opera	Joanna and Julia	September 16, 2008
2	75	China - New Year's	Joanna and Julia	September 16, 2008
2	76	Canada - Winterlude	Joanna and Julia	September 16, 2008
2	77	Canada - Ice Fun	Joanna and Julia	September 17, 2008
2	78	Canada - Wild Animals	Joanna and Julia	September 17, 2008
2	79	Canada - Maple Syrup	TJ and Tristan	September 18, 2008
2	80	Canada - Stampede	Joanna and Julia	September 18, 2008
3	81	Canada - Dinosaurs	Charlie and Gabriel	September 5, 2011
3	82	Canada - Totem Poles	Hillary and Emily	September 6, 2011
3	83	Canada - Whales	Jessica and Jake	September 7, 2011
3	84	Canada - Lighthouse	Jessica and Jake	September 8, 2011
3	85	Ecuador - Cloud Forest	Charlie and Gabriel	September 9, 2011
3	86	Ecuador - Quito	Charlie and Gabriel	September 12, 2011
3	87	Ecuador - Village	Charlie and Gabriel	September 13, 2011
3	88	Brazil - Pink Dolphins	Jessica and Jake	November 22, 2008
3	89	Brazil - Tree Climbing	Jessica and Jake	November 22, 2008
3	90	Brazil - Statue	Jessica and Jake	December 20, 2008
3	91	Brazil - Beach	Jessica and Jake	December 21, 2008
3	92	U.S.A. - NASA	Jessica and Jake	December 22, 2008
3	93	U.S.A. - Alligators	Jessica and Jake	January 3, 2009
3	94	U.S.A. - Manatees	Jessica and Jake	September 22, 2011
3	95	Hungary - Palace	Hillary and Emily	September 23, 2011
3	96	Hungary - Medieval	Hillary and Emily	September 26, 2011
3	97	Hungary - Market	Hilary and Emily	September 27, 2011
3	98	Hungary - Horses	Hillary and Emily	September 28, 2011
3	99	Israel - Sukkot	Charlie and Gabriel	September 29, 2011
3	100	Israel - Dead Sea	Hillary and Emily	September 30, 2011
3	101	Israel - Masada	Hillary and Emily	October 2, 2011
3	102	Israel - Olives	Charlie and Gabriel	October 4, 2011
3	103	Jordan - Chariot Race	Rehan and Aamil	October 5, 2011
3	104	Jordan - Petra	Rehan and Aamil	October 6, 2011
3	105	Jordan - Desert	Rehan and Aamil	October 7, 2011
3	106	UAE - Camel Race	Hillary and Emily	October 5, 2011
3	107	UAE - Tallest Building	Hillary and Emily	October 11, 2011
3	108	UAE - Arabian Animals	Hillary and Emily	October 12, 2011
3	109	Japan - Sumo Wrestling	Rehan and Aamil	October 13, 2011
3	110	Japan - Robots	Rehan and Aamil	October 14, 2011
3	111	Japan - Snow Monkeys	Rehan and Aamil	October 17, 2011
3	112	Japan - Ninja	Rehan and Aamil	October 18, 2011
3	113	Canada - Snowmobiling	Charlie and Gabriel	October 19, 2011
3	114	Antigua and Barbuda - Music	Rehan and Aamil	October 20, 2011
3	115	Antigua and Barbuda - Pirates	Rehan and Aamil	October 21, 2011
3	116	Antigua and Barbuda - Singrays	Rehan and Aamil	October 24, 2011
3	117	Mongolia - Eagles	Jessica and Jake	October 25, 2011
3	118	Mongolia - Camels	Jessica and Jake	October 26, 2011
3	119	Mongolia - Throat Singing	Jessica and Jake	October 27, 2011
