= The Wolfman Jack Show =

1976 television program

- Genre: Variety
- Directed by: Mark Warren
- Country of origin: Canada
- Original language: English
- No. of seasons: 1

Production
- Executive producer: Don Kelley
- Producer: Riff Markowitz
- Running time: 30 minutes

Original release
- Network: CBC Television
- Release: 5 October 1976 – 13 September 1977

The Wolfman Jack Show is a Canadian variety show that aired on CBC Television from 1976 to 1977, and was syndicated to stations in the United States.

== Premise ==
This Vancouver-based program was a co-production of the CBC and host Wolfman Jack's production company, Howl Productions. International musical guests were combined with Canadian musicians such as Bachman–Turner Overdrive and The Stampeders. Other segments frequently featured comedy from Peter Cullen, Danny Wells and Sally Sales, with sketches from the Famous People Players.

This program was broadcast concurrently with Wolfman Jack's other music program, The Midnight Special on NBC, where he was an announcer and co-host.

== Scheduling ==
This half-hour program was broadcast on CBC Television Tuesdays at 7:30 p.m. (Eastern) from 5 October 1976 until 13 September 1977.
