= Mark Blutman =

American/Canadian television producer and writer (born 1960)

- Born: August 27, 1960 (age 65); New Jersey, U.S.
- Occupations: Writer; producer
- Years active: 1994–present
- Children: 2

Mark Blutman (born August 27, 1960) is an American/Canadian writer and producer. He is the writer/producer on several children's television series including Boy Meets World, Girl Meets World, and Ghostwriter.

== Early life ==
Blutman was born in New Jersey and raised in Montreal, Canada. During his youth, he played ice hockey in Canada and once gave up 11 goals to Wayne Gretzky.

== Career ==
Blutman has been the writer/producer on several American television shows, largely geared toward the teenage audience, including Boy Meets World, Girl Meets World, and Ghostwriter.

He started his career in Los Angeles as a stand up comedian and then moved on to his writing/producing career when his stand-up career did not take off. In 1987, he appeared as "Crusher Comic" on Just for Laughs, a comedy festival in Montreal. Crusher Comic was Blutman's stand-up alter-ego in which he would don a ski mask, yellow tights, and a tuxedo/leotard combo as part of his wrestler/comedian act.

== Awards and nominations ==
Year	Title	Award	Won/Nominated
2015	Girl Meets World	Primetime Emmy Award for Outstanding Children's Program	Nominated
2016	Girl Meets World	Primetime Emmy Award for Outstanding Children's Program	Nominated
2016	Girl Meets World	Writers Guild of America Award for Television: Episodic Drama	Nominated
2016	Girl Meets World	Writers Guild of America Award for Television: Children's Script	Nominated
2017	Girl Meets World	Primetime Emmy Award for Outstanding Children's Program	Nominated
2020	Ghostwriter	Venice TV Awards	Nominated
2020	Ghostwriter	Daytime Emmy Award for Outstanding Writing for a Children's Series	Nominated
2020	Ghostwriter	Daytime Emmy Award for Outstanding Children's Series	Won
