= Tactical Girls =

- Created by: Melissa D'Agostino; Matt Campagna; Diana Bentley
- Written by: Melissa D'Agostino, Matt Campagna, Diana Bentley
- Directed by: Matt Campagna
- Starring: Nicole Stamp, Melissa D'Agostino, Diana Bentley
- Country of origin: Canada
- Original language: English
- No. of seasons: 1
- No. of episodes: 3

Production
- Producers: Melissa D'Agostino, Matt Campagna, Diana Bentley
- Cinematography: Matt Campagna
- Camera setup: Single-camera
- Running time: 11 minutes
- Production company: Goldstrike Films

Tactical Girls is a Canadian digital series created and written by Melissa D'Agostino, Matt Campagna and Diana Bentley. The series stars Nicole Stamp, Melissa D'Agostino and Diana Bentley as three women who work in the trucking industry, but at night dress as soldiers for tactical missions. The first season was released in August 2016.

== Cast ==
- Melissa D'Agostino as Dougy
- Nicole Stamp as Stamper
- Dian Bentley as Bender
- Maria Vacratsis as The Boss
- Ted Dykstra as Colonel McCullough
- Kristian Bruun as Detective Laurence

== Reception ==
The series has screened at festivals around the world, winning Best TV/Web Series at the Canada Independent Film Festival playing at the Seattle Web Fest and winning at 5th Canadian Screen Awards for Melissa D'Agostino for Best Performance by an Actress in a Program or Series Produced for Digital Media.
