= Ghostwriter (2019 TV series) =

2019 Canadian-American television series

- Genre: Children's series; Mystery; Fantasy
- Developed by: J. J. Johnson; Andrew Orenstein
- Starring: Isaac Arellanes; Amadi Chapata; Justin Sanchez; Hannah Levinson; Nour Assaf; Princess Mapp; Daire McLeod
- Composers: Erica Procunier; Janal Bechthold; Sasha Gordon
- Countries of origin: United States; Canada
- Original language: English
- No. of seasons: 3
- No. of episodes: 39

Production
- Executive producers: J. J. Johnson; Andrew Orenstein; Christin Simms; Blair Powers; Kay Wilson Stallings; Luke Matheny
- Producer: Sari Friedland
- Production locations: Hamilton, Ontario
- Running time: 22–26 minutes
- Production companies: Sinking Ship Entertainment; Sesame Workshop

Original release
- Network: Apple TV+
- Release: November 1, 2019 – October 21, 2022

Related
- Ghostwriter (1992 TV series)

Ghostwriter is a children's mystery television series developed by J. J. Johnson & Andrew Orenstein as an original series for Apple TV+, and premiered on November 1, 2019, coinciding with the launch of the service. It is a revival of the 1992–1995 series of the same name. The third and final season premiered on October 21, 2022.

== Premise ==
=== Seasons 1–2 ===
Ruben struggles to fit in at his new middle school after he and his mother move to live with his grandfather, who lives above the bookstore he owns. A ghost known as Ghostwriter communicates with written messages and by creating manifestations of fictional characters, all of which only the four main characters can perceive. As they become friends and learn to work as a team, Ghostwriter sends them characters from stories with themes relevant to their lives.

=== Season 3 ===
Some time after the previous two seasons, a new ghostwriter picks three children he had met in life to help return a scroll called the Eloquent Peasant back to Egypt where it was first found. As with the previous ghostwriter, he does this through bringing storybook characters to life.

== Cast and characters ==
=== Main ===
- Isaac Arellanes as Ruben Reyna (seasons 1–2)
- Amadi Chapata as Chevon Redmond (seasons 1–2)
- Justin Sanchez as Curtis Palmer-Moreno (seasons 1–2)
- Hannah Levinson as Donna Palmer-Moreno (seasons 1–2)
- Nour Assaf as Samir Yousef (season 3)
- Princess Mapp as Nia Joy Barnes (season 3)
- Daire McLeod as Charli Allen (season 3)
- Josette Halpert as Sydney Allen (season 3)
- Romel De Silva as Oliver Ramos (season 3)
- Tony Ofori as Malcolm (season 3)
- Lisa Berry as Layla Barnes (season 3)

=== Book characters ===
- Devyn Nekoda as Alice
- Neil Patrick Harris as The White Rabbit
- Josh Cruddas as The Mad Hatter
- Patrice Goodman as The Queen of Hearts
- Julian Zane Chowdhury as Mowgli
- Aasif Mandvi as Bagheera
- Cameron Brodeur as The Camarillo Kid
- Andrew Chown as Hitch
- Louisa Zhu as Dale Sweet
- Kiara Groulx as Raine Watson (from The Disappearance of Emily H.)
- Steven Yaffee as Dr. Victor Frankenstein
- Stephen R. Hart as The Monster
- Ess Hödlmoser as Female Monster
- Chloe Ling as Dajie
- Jeff Joseph as Frank Clemons
- Camilla Arfwedson as Sherlock "Shirl" Holmes
- Zoe Doyle as Dr. Joan Watson
- Brett Dalton as Captain Vincent (from the Time Castaways series)
- Chris Diamantopoulos as Owen Quinn
- Kate Drummond as Genevieve Marcus
- Steve Valentine as Jimmy Bones
- Alain Goulem as Sergeant Belson
- Rachel Wilson as Linda Quinn
- Aviv Cohen as Jean Belson
- Jacob Boose as The Scarecrow
- Esther Ming Li as The Tin Girl
- Randall Park as The Cowardly Lion
- Noah Lamanna as The Wicked Witch of the West
- Joshua Zaharia as Leo El Magnifico
- Jay Baruchel as Ralph S. Mouse
- Sydney Kuhne as Rainbow
- Jean Smart as Charlotte
- Iain Armitage as Wilbur
- Darrin Baker as Homer Zuckerman
- Evan Annisette as Lurvy
- Amy O'Grady as The Sheep
- Teresa Pavlinek as The Goose
- Jewelle Blackman as Mami Wata (from Bayou Magic)
- Farhang Ghajar as Khun-Anup

== Episodes ==
Season	Episodes		Originally released
1	13	7	November 1, 2019
1	13	6	May 1, 2020
2	13	7	October 9, 2020
2	13	6	May 7, 2021
3	13		October 21, 2022

=== Season 1 (2019–20) ===
No. overall	No. in season	Title	Directed by	Written by	Original release date
Part 1
1	1	"Ghost in Wonderland"	Luke Matheny	Andrew Orenstein	November 1, 2019
2	2	"Ghost in Wonderland"	Luke Matheny	Andrew Orenstein	November 1, 2019
Four children have to come together after a strange ghost starts leaving them messages only they can see. Things get even weirder when a talking white rabbit starts running amok in school. The children try to find the released Wonderland characters, convinced that doing so would satisfy the ghost that has been haunting them.
3	3	"The Jungle Ghost"	Michael Mohan	Lauren Thompson	November 1, 2019
4	4	"The Jungle Ghost"	Michael Mohan	Lauren Thompson	November 1, 2019
After the ghost asks for help on the bookstore's typewriter, the children find Mowgli and learn that they, too, can understand animals while he is near. Mowgli has run away, along with all the dogs from the shelter. Finding him is the only way to return him to the book, along with learning what secret the stray cat Spinoza knows about Ruben's grandmother.
5	5	"The Wild, Wild Ghost"	Aprill Winney	Mark Blutman	November 1, 2019
6	6	"The Wild, Wild Ghost"	Aprill Winney	Mark Blutman	November 1, 2019
7	7	"The Wild, Wild Ghost"	Aprill Winney	Mark Blutman	November 1, 2019
A strange cowboy called the Camarillo Kid has moseyed into town, and he's hiding from a mean cowboy known as Hitch. Hitch is following the children to find the Camarillo Kid. The kids discover that the characters escaped from a science fiction book instead of a classic western. Now that they have the book, they just need to track down the characters, and figure out what lock fits the mysterious key.
Part 2
8	8	"A Sparkly Ghost"	Luke Matheny	Luke Matheny	May 1, 2020
9	9	"A Sparkly Ghost"	Luke Matheny	Luke Matheny	May 1, 2020
10	10	"A Sparkly Ghost"	Luke Matheny	Luke Matheny	May 1, 2020
A young girl named Raine gets pulled out of her own book thanks to her powers to see "sparkles", solidified memories of people. The kids use her powers to find out what Grandma was doing back in 1972. Ruben tracks down Fi and asks her questions about his grandmother. In trying to find the inheritance Grandma supposedly got from Aunt Sadie, the boys get themselves trapped inside a sparkle.
11	11	"Franken-Ghost"	Jonathan Judge	Aminta Goyel	May 1, 2020
12	12	"Franken-Ghost"	Jonathan Judge	Aminta Goyel	May 1, 2020
13	13	"Franken-Ghost"	Jonathan Judge	Aminta Goyel	May 1, 2020
During a dress rehearsal as Caliban, Frankenstein's monster confuses Ruben for a real monster. The kids try to convince Dr. Frankenstein that making a friend for The Monster is a good idea. The second monster is wreaking havoc around town, and normal people can see her. It is up to them to get everyone back into the book and fix everything.

=== Season 2 (2020–21) ===
No. overall	No. in season	Title	Directed by	Written by	Original release date
Part 1
14	1	"The Ghostly Paintbrush"	Melanie Orr	Levi Abrino	October 9, 2020
15	2	"The Ghostly Paintbrush"	Melanie Orr	Levi Abrino	October 9, 2020
Reuben's paintings start to materialize in real life. All of the paintbrush's creations are starting to backfire, and the paintbrush is still missing.
16	3	"Ghost Cab"	Mars Horodyski	Joanna Quraishi	October 9, 2020
17	4	"Ghost Cab"	Mars Horodyski	Joanna Quraishi	October 9, 2020
While looking for the characters believed to be released from The Cobalt Mask, a strange cabbie stalls his car across from the bookstore. Learning that Frank is actually a spy, the kids follow him to the end of his route.
18	5	"The Case Of The Missing Ghost"	Stephen Reynolds	Aminta Goyel	October 9, 2020
19	6	"The Case Of The Missing Ghost"	Stephen Reynolds	Aminta Goyel	October 9, 2020
20	7	"The Case Of The Missing Ghost"	Stephen Reynolds	Aminta Goyel	October 9, 2020
Gender-flipped versions of Sherlock and Watson show up at the bookstore, and help narrow down the identity of Mason Briggs. Upset at learning Shirl Holmes is still alive, Watson decides to leave her on her own to solve the case. Holmes and Watson help narrow down the location of Mason Briggs's house as seen from the vision in "A Sparkly Ghost".
Part 2
21	8	"Ghost Castaways"	J.J. Johnson	J.J. Johnson & Christin Simms	May 7, 2021
22	9	"Ghost Castaways"	J.J. Johnson	J.J. Johnson & Christin Simms	May 7, 2021
23	10	"Ghost Castaways"	J.J. Johnson	J.J. Johnson & Christin Simms	May 7, 2021
After discovering they traveled forward in time, the children find the newest book Ghostwriter has unleashed is the "Time Castaways". They use the ship to travel back in time to 1955, where they meet Ruben's grandmother as a child. Ruben disappears thanks to a time ripple, and the rest of the gang have to work with Captain Vincent to fix it. Having finally tracked down Mason Briggs, the children work to find the missing manuscript.
24	11	"The Ghost Writer"	Luke Matheny	Mackenzie Moore	May 7, 2021
25	12	"The Ghost Writer"	Luke Matheny	Mackenzie Moore	May 7, 2021
26	13	"The Ghost Writer"	Luke Matheny	Mackenzie Moore	May 7, 2021
In an attempt to finish Mason Briggs' unfinished manuscript, Ghostwriter allows the kids to enter into the story. The kids continue to write the story while the bookstore struggles to make ends meet. The kids hurry to finish the book before the bookstore is sold off.

=== Season 3 (2022) ===
No. overall	No. in season	Title	Directed by	Written by	Original release date
27	1	"Ghost of Oz"	Luke Matheny	Andrew Orenstein	October 21, 2022
28	2	"Ghost of Oz"	Luke Matheny	Andrew Orenstein	October 21, 2022
29	3	"Ghost of Oz"	Luke Matheny	Andrew Orenstein	October 21, 2022
Back in Village Books, three new children are called upon to help a new ghost, by means of guiding a Scarecrow, Tin Girl, and Lion from an updated Wizard of Oz book. The trio learn that Oliver, a professor all three of them had met, may be calling for their help from beyond the grave. In order to get the USB drive back from the Tin Girl, the children try to give the Ozians exactly what they need.
30	4	"The Magic Ghost"	Luke Matheny	Luke Matheny	October 21, 2022
31	5	"The Magic Ghost"	Luke Matheny	Luke Matheny	October 21, 2022
The Eloquent Peasant is confirmed to be a fake, and Leo el Magnifico, a child magician, is released to help figure out how it was smuggled out. Charli has to perform magic for Oliver's nephew in order to take a small sarcophagus out of his room.
32	6	"The Ghost, the Mouse, and the Motorcycle"	Warren P. Sonoda	Levi Abrino	October 21, 2022
33	7	"The Ghost, the Mouse, and the Motorcycle"	Warren P. Sonoda	Levi Abrino	October 21, 2022
Ghostwriter releases Ralph, the mouse from The Mouse and the Motorcycle, who can bring toys to life if he makes their sound. Nia starts a group to fight racism in the neighbourhood. Samir feels guilty about lying to his family so he can spend more time with his friends. Charli's sister gets accepted into a prestigious secret club.
34	8	"He’s a Ghost, She’s a Rainbow"	Nishima Mukerji	Barbara Soares	October 21, 2022
35	9	"He’s a Ghost, She’s a Rainbow"	Nishima Mukerji	Barbara Soares	October 21, 2022
Instead of a book, Ghostwriter brings to life a woman from the song "She's a Rainbow" who can change her form. The kids use Rainbow's abilities to infiltrate the Hawthorne Society to track down Alex Thomson's real identity.
36	10	"The Ghost’s Web"	J.J. Johnson	J.J. Johnson & Christin Simms	October 21, 2022
37	11	"The Ghost’s Web"	J.J. Johnson	J.J. Johnson & Christin Simms	October 21, 2022
Upset about her mom getting set up, Nia is sucked into Charlotte's Web. Samir goes to investigate the archaeology lab. Charli and Syd going to a magic club, courtesy of Amber. Nia has to save Wilbur from a butcher truck. Samir and Charli investigate the origins of the Eloquent Peasant and the forgery. Sydney looks around the Hawthorne Club.
38	12	"The Eloquent Ghost on the Bayou"	Aprill Winney	Lauren Thompson	October 21, 2022
39	13	"The Eloquent Ghost on the Bayou"	Aprill Winney	Lauren Thompson	October 21, 2022
With the help of Mami Wata, the kids find the hiding spot of the Eloquent Peasant. Sydney tries to convince Griffin to come clean. With the Eloquent Peasant in hand, the kids need to figure out how to return it and get the culprits caught.

== Production ==
=== Development ===
Apple picked up the revival of the 1992 series Ghostwriter in 2019. The series was written and directed by Luke Matheny, and is executive produced by J.J. Johnson, Andrew Orenstein, and Christin Simms.

=== Filming ===
Principal photography and videography of the series commenced in December 2018, and concluded during Summer 2019. Filming took place in Hamilton, Ontario.

=== Bonus videos ===
A series of bonus videos called Ghostwriter: Beyond the Page premiered on April 1, 2021.

== Reception ==
=== Critical reception ===
On Rotten Tomatoes, season one of Ghostwriter has a 100% approval rating, with an average score of 9.5/10 based on 6 reviews.

=== Accolades ===
Year	Award	Category	Recipient(s)	Result	Ref.
2020	Daytime Emmy Awards	Outstanding Special Effects Costume. Make Up and Hairstyling	Kristin Somborac, Liz Roelands, Lynda McCormack	Nominated	
2020	Daytime Emmy Awards	Outstanding Costume Design/Styling	Kristin Somborac	Nominated	
2020	Daytime Emmy Awards	Outstanding Cinematography	George Lajtai	Nominated	
2020	Daytime Emmy Awards	Outstanding Lighting Direction	George Lajtai	Nominated	
2020	Daytime Emmy Awards	Outstanding Directing for a Children's or Young Adult Program	Luke Matheny, Michael Mohan, Aprill Winney	Nominated	
2020	Daytime Emmy Awards	Outstanding Sound Editing for a Live Action Program	Sean Karp, Noah Siegel, William Preventis, John Sievert	Nominated	
2020	Daytime Emmy Awards	Outstanding Main Title and Graphic Design for a Live Action Program	J.J. Johnson, Matthew J.R. Bishop, Stephen Curran, Daryl Shail, Nial McFadyen	Nominated	
2020	Daytime Emmy Awards	Outstanding Writing for a Children's or Young Adult Program	Andrew Orenstein, Levi Abrino, Joanna Quraishi, Lauren Thompson, Mark Blutman	Nominated	
2020	Daytime Emmy Awards	Outstanding Children's or Family Viewing Program	J.J. Johnson, Blair Powers, Christin Simms, Kay Wilson Stallings, Luke Matheny, Andrew Orenstein, Matthew J.R. Bishop, Carla de Jong, Melanie Grisanti, Jordan Geary, Aminta Goyel, Lauren Thompson, Sari Friedland and Mark Blutman	Won	
2020	Directors Guild of America	Outstanding Directing – Children's Programs	Luke Matheny (for "Ghost in Wonderland, Part 1”)	Nominated	
2020	Imagen Foundation Awards	Best Young Actor - Television	Isaac Arellanes	Nominated	
2020	Imagen Foundation Awards	Best Young Actor - Television	Justin Sanchez	Nominated	
2020	Venice TV Awards	Best Children / Youth Series	Ghostwriter	Nominated	
2020	Writers Guild of Canada Screenwriting Awards	Children’s	Andrew Orenstein (for “Ghost in Wonderland, Part 1”)	Nominated	
2021	Daytime Emmy Awards	Outstanding Art Direction/Set Decoration/Scenic Design for a Drama or Daytime Fiction Program		Nominated	
2021	Daytime Emmy Awards	Outstanding Hairstyling for a Drama or Daytime Fiction Program		Nominated	
2021	Daytime Emmy Awards	Outstanding Lighting Direction for a Drama or Daytime Fiction Program		Nominated	
2021	Daytime Emmy Awards	Outstanding Music Direction and Composition for a Daytime Program	Erica Procunier, Sasha Gordon	Nominated	
2021	Daytime Emmy Awards	Outstanding Sound Mixing and Editing for a Drama or Daytime Fiction Program	Sean W. Karp, Noah Siegel, Andrew Wright, Jason Charbboneau, Stefan Fraticelli, Ron Mellegers, Randy Wilson, Brandon Bak, Teddy Salas, Igor Bezuglov, David Guerra, William Preventis	Nominated	
