= Lockdown (2020 TV series) =

Canadian-American web television series

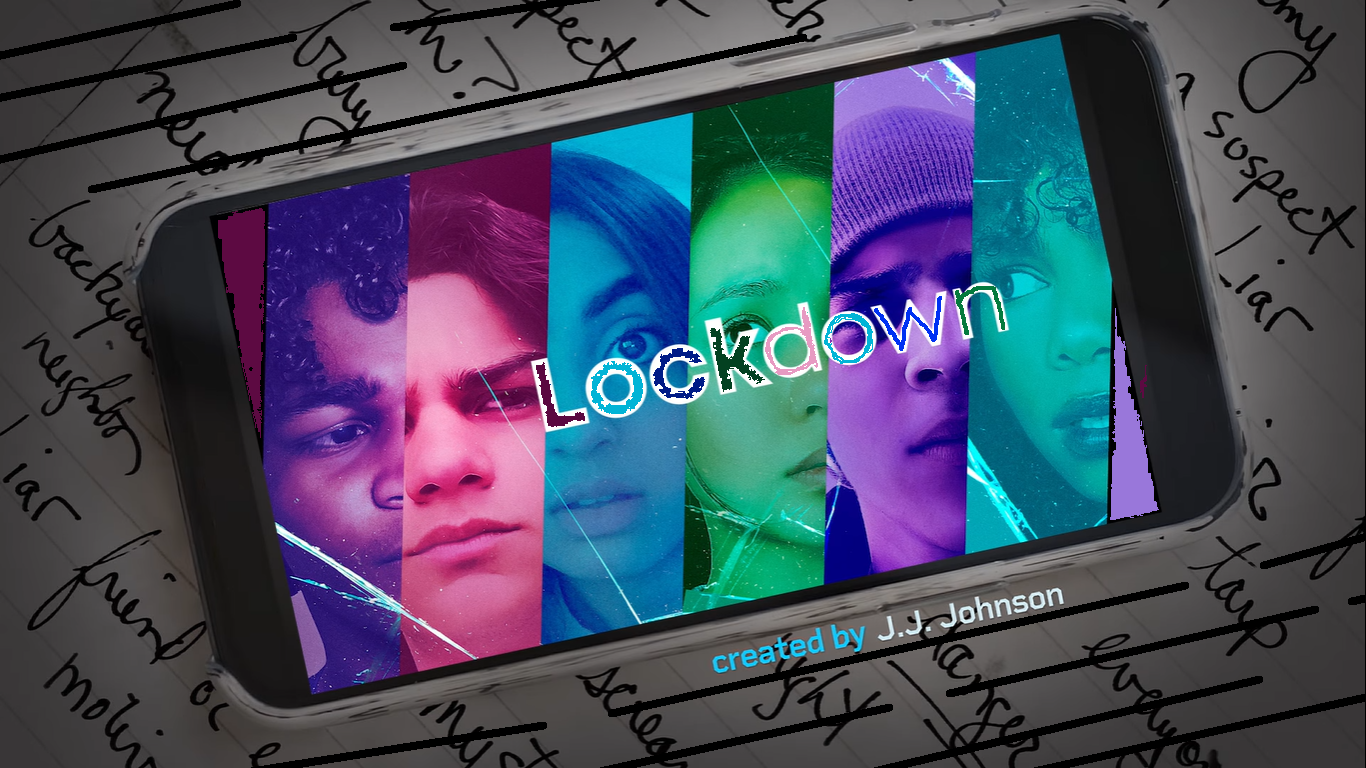
- Genre: Mystery; Thriller; Teen drama; Children's television
- Created by: J. J. Johnson
- Developed by: J.J. Johnson; Christin Simms
- Written by: J.J. Johnson; Christin Simms
- Directed by: J.J Johnson
- Starring: Arista Ahin; Saara Chaudry; Amanda Cheung; Dorian Giordano; Edison Grant; Tomaso Sanelli
- Composer: Erica Procunier
- Countries of origin: Canada; United States
- Original language: English
- No. of seasons: 2
- No. of episodes: 16

Production
- Executive producers: J.J Johnson; Blair Powers; Christin Simms; Matthew J.R. Bishop; Carla de Jong
- Producer: Alex Grieve
- Editor: Courtney Goldman
- Running time: 12–14 minutes
- Production company: Sinking Ship Entertainment

Original release
- Network: YouTube Premium
- Release: June 26, 2020

Lockdown (also stylized as Lockdown: The Scream Next Door and Lockdown: Who Is Question Mark Face?) is a children's and teen drama mystery thriller web series produced by Sinking Ship Entertainment and commissioned and distributed by YouTube Originals. Conceived, developed and produced in the midst of the COVID-19 pandemic in Canada and the United States, the scripted live-action series follows a group of socially distanced teenagers working together to solve a mystery in their neighborhood. Originally announced in April 2020, the initial ten-episode series premiered on the YouTube Originals for Kids & Family channel on June 26, 2020.

The series received a Webby Award for best educational or science video series, a Special Achievement Award from the Prix Jeunesse International festival for excellence in COVID-19 programming, the global festival that every two years recognizes the best in children and youth television, as well as the Content Innovation Award for Kids Programming. The series was also recognized by the MIPCOM Diversify TV Excellence Awards, while series stars Arista Arhin and Amanda Cheung were nominated by the Joey Awards for their performances. In 2021, the series was nominated for two Canadian Screen Awards for its writing.

YouTube Originals announced in October 2020 that it had ordered six new episodes of Lockdown as part of its focus on racial justice programming. The new season, titled Lockdown: Who Is Question Mark Face? premiered on the YouTube Originals for Kids & Family channel on November 19, 2020. The first season was also picked up for second-window by WildBrain for the Family Channel in Canada.

== Premise ==
This scripted series follows six teenaged friends as they work together to solve mysteries in their neighborhood during the social distancing era. Shot entirely via webcam and smartphone from the actors' homes and neighborhoods, the series is a suspenseful look at how young people stay in touch while having to stay away, and the story unfolds almost in real-time as the friend group works together – from a distance – to solve the mystery, while also exploring their own anxieties and frustrations about life during a pandemic.

=== Lockdown: The Scream Next Door ===
In this initial ten-episode season, which takes place during days 1 through 60 of a Covid-19 lockdown, Nira overhears what sounds like a woman's scream one night from her neighbor's house. As she enlists the help of her friends Aiden, Chris, Emi and Sam - along with Emi's crush Luke, who lives on the other side of Nira's neighbor - new suspicious events, including late night digging and creepy notes - thicken the plot. As they work together remotely and use technological tools to solve the mystery, they also support each other emotionally through the pandemic and the experience of being in quarantine. Storylines include Luke's grandmother at risk for Covid-19 in her retirement community, Sam's nurse father quarantining away from the family, Emi being verbally attacked for her Asian ethnicity, Aiden's and Sam's efforts in the online video game Bielzemor, a love triangle and bourgeoning romantic feelings between Luke and Nira as well as between Emi and Chris.

=== Lockdown: Who Is Question Mark Face? ===
In the six-episode second season that takes place days 61 through 120 of lockdown, the six teens reckon with a growing racial justice movement following the murders of George Floyd and Ahmaud Arbery, the shooting of Breonna Taylor, and others. After Sam organizes a local Black Lives Matter march, Chris' family's restaurant - which had been preemptively boarded up ahead of Sam's community march - is vandalized with graffiti. A masked figure calling themselves Question Mark Face releases a video on social media claiming responsibility for the attack and promises for future attacks, while local real estate agent Mary Lewis blames Sam for the tagging. As Question Mark Face continues to target local businesses, the six teens work together to investigate the perpetrator's identity and motive. Throughout the season, the show explores how each of the main characters are responding to the George Floyd protests and Black Lives Matter movement, including Sam's growing social activism, Chris' focus on allyship, and Emi's use of fashion to make her voice heard. Additional storylines include Sam's crush on fellow gamer Harley, the socioeconomic impact of the lockdowns on families, and the differing philosophies on how to make a difference between Sam, her friends and her cousin Asha.

== Cast and characters ==
=== Main cast ===
- Saara Chaudry as Nira
- Arista Arhin as Sam
- Amanda Cheung as Emi
- Dorian Giordano as Aiden
- Edison Grant as Luke
- Tomaso Sanelli as Chris

=== Supporting cast ===
- Jackie Richardson as Luke's Grandma (seasons 1-2)
- Ayesha Mansur Gonsalves as Aunt Raina (seasons 1-2)
- Michael Brown as Sam's Dad (seasons 1-2)
- Jayne Eastwood as Mrs. Eastwood (seasons 1-2)
- Emaan Chaudry as Kumari (season 1)
- Sean Patrick Dolan as Jeremy (season 2)
- Katie Griffin as Mary Lewis (season 2)
- Kiki Hamill as Asha (season 2)
- Andrew Jackson as Bernard (season 2)
- Lex Mayson as Harley (season 2)

== Episodes ==
Season	Episodes	Originally released	
Season	Episodes	First released	Last released
1	10	June 26, 2020	July 14, 2020
2	6	November 19, 2020	

=== Season 1: The Scream Next Door (2020) ===
No. overall	No. in season	Title	Directed by	Written by	Original release date
1	1	"Neighbor Watching"	J.J. Johnson	J.J. Johnson, Christin Simms	June 26, 2020
2	2	"Walk-By"	J.J. Johnson	Sabrina Sherif	June 26, 2020
3	3	"Stake Outing"	Warren P. Sonoda	Lakna Edilima	June 26, 2020
4	4	"Bad Connection"	Warren P. Sonoda	Thomas Conway	June 26, 2020
5	5	"Unfriended"	Melanie Orr	Sabrina Sherif	June 26, 2020
6	6	"If The Shoe Fits"	Melanie Orr	Lakna Edilima	June 26, 2020
7	7	"Relationship Status"	Stephen Reynolds	Thomas Conway	July 2, 2020
8	8	"Angry Face"	Lisa Rose Snow	J.J. Johnson, Christin Simms	July 7, 2020
9	9	"Social Togetherness"	Nicole Stamp	J.J. Johnson, Christin Simms. Teleplay by J.J. Johnson, Christin Simms, Nicole Stamp	July 8, 2020
10	10	"Killer Instinct"	Christin Simms	Christin Simms	July 14, 2020

=== Season 2: Who Is Question Mark Face? (2020) ===
No. overall	No. in season	Title	Directed by	Written by	Original release date
11	1	"The Confession"	Nicole Stamp	Lisa Codrington	November 19, 2020
12	2	"Guilty Unil Proven Innocent"	J.J. Neepin	Nicole Stamp	November 19, 2020
13	3	"Best Intentions"	Alicia K. Harris	Desmond Sargeant	November 19, 2020
14	4	"The Sting"	Shawn Gerrard	Gillian Muller	November 19, 2020
15	5	"Ticking Clock"	Ayesha Mansur Gonsalves	Alejandro Alcoba	November 19, 2020
16	6	"Questions Answered"	Tiffany Hsiung	Aaron Bala	November 19, 2020

== Reception ==
Common Sense Media awarded Lockdown for its Common Sense Selection for Families seal, calling it a "enjoyable, fresh series adapts a traditional whodunnit story to the 2020-era pandemic experience of being homebound for weeks on end" that "doubles as a modern spin on Rear Window-style suspense and a more realistic, revealing glimpse into the teens' psyche during a period of compulsory quarantine." Cablefax also praised the series, noting "it's not difficult to see why this series...has garnered awards for youth programming" and "it's not an easy assignment for the mostly teen cast of “Lockdown” to create art on a small screen, but they do it well," while commending its inclusion of timely issues, including the Black Lives Matter movement and the LGBTQ+ experience.

== Accolades ==
Year	Award	Category	Recipient(s)	Result
2022	Canadian Screen Awards	Best Children's or Youth Fiction Program or Series	Aaron Bala, Lisa Codrington, J.J. Johnson, Blair Powers, Christin Simms, Matthew J.R. Bishop, Carla de Jong, Alejandro Alcoba	Nominated
2022	Canadian Screen Awards	Best Direction, Children's or Youth	Episode: "The Confession" Nicole Stamp	Nominated
2022	Canadian Screen Awards	Best Writing, Children's or Youth	Episode: "The Confession" Lisa Codrington	Nominated
2022	Canadian Screen Awards	Best Writing, Children's or Youth	Episode: "Guilty Until Proven Innocent" Nicole Stamp	Nominated
2022	Canadian Screen Awards	Best Performance, Children's or Youth	Saara Chaudry	Won
2021	Daytime Emmy Awards	Outstanding Younger Performer in a Daytime Fiction Series	Arista Arhin	Nominated
2021	Webby Awards	Video Series & Channels - Science & Education	Lockdown	Won
2021	Canadian Screen Awards	Best Writing, Web Program or Series	Episode: "Social Togetherness" J. J. Johnson, Nicole Stamp, Christin Simms	Nominated
2021	Canadian Screen Awards	Best Writing, Web Program or Series	Episode: "Stake Outing" Lakna Edilima	Nominated
2021	Canadian Alliance of Film & Television Costume Arts & Design (CAFTCAD) Awards	Best Costume Design in a Web Series	Christine Toye	Nominated
2021	WGC Screenwriting Awards	Tweens & Teens	Episode: "Social Togetherness" J.J. Johnson, Nicole Stamp, Christin Simms	Nominated
2021	WGC Screenwriting Awards	Tweens & Teens	Episode: "Stake Outing" Lakna Edilima	Nominated
2020	Prix Jeunesse International	Special Achievement Prize (for excellence in Covid-19 programming)	Lockdown	Won
2020	MIPCOM Diversify TV Excellence Awards	Representation of Diversity - Kids Programming	Lockdown	Nominated
2020	Content Innovation Awards	Innovation & Ingenuity Award - Kids Programming	Lockdown	Won
2020	Joey Awards	Best Actress in a Webseries 12-15 Years	Amanda Cheung	Nominated
2020	Joey Awards	Best Actress in a Webseries 12-15 Years	Arista Arhin	Nominated
