= Chirp (TV series) =

- Genre: Adventure; Comedy; Preschool
- Created by: J. J. Johnson
- Based on: Chirp by Bayard Canada
- Directed by: Mike Valiquette; M.R. Horhager
- Voices of: Jacob Ewaniuk; Adrian David Lloyd; Brianna D'Aguanno; Elana Catherine Durtnall
- Composers: Brian Pickett; Graeme Cornies; David Kelly; James Chapple; Earl Torno for Wanted! Sound and Picture
- Country of origin: Canada
- Original language: English
- No. of seasons: 1
- No. of episodes: 52

Production
- Executive producers: J.J. Johnson; Blair Powers; Pete Denomme; Jonas Diamond
- Producers: Jain Dickson; Mike Valiquette
- Running time: 11 minutes
- Production companies: Sinking Ship Entertainment; Smiley Guy Studios

Original release
- Network: CBC Television
- Release: March 6, 2015 – November 28, 2016

Chirp is a Canadian animated children's television series created by J. J. Johnson. The series is based on the Canadian children's magazine Chirp. It was previewed on Kids' CBC on March 6, 2015, and premiered on April 20.

== Premise ==
Chirp is about Chirp, Squawk, and Tweet, three anthropomorphic birds who use their imaginations to go on adventures together.

== Characters ==
- Chirp (voiced by Jacob Ewaniuk) is a male yellow bird who wears red boots.
- Squawk (voiced by Adrian David Lloyd) is a male blue bird.
- Tweet (voiced by Brianna D'Aguanno) is a female orange bird who has purple spots.
- Sparky (voiced by Elana Catherine Durtnall) is a dog who gives advice and explains what item Chirp, Squawk, and Tweet have.
- The Mail Squirrel is a flying squirrel that delivers packages to Chirp, Squawk, and Tweet, containing items to use on their adventures.
- The Vole Brothers are voles that use items to try and acquire apples in creative, and usually unsuccessful ways.

== Episodes ==
0.0 Pilot 19 May 2010
Sn.Ep	Title	Written By:	CBC Air Date
1.1	There She Blows!	J.J. Johnson	March 6, 2015
1.2	To the Peak	J.J. Johnson	March 13, 2015
1.3	Knights of the Awesome Castle	Sheila Dinsmore	March 20, 2015
1.4	Waddle of the Penguins	Diana Moore	March 27, 2015
1.5	Astro-Birds	Nicole Demerse	April 3, 2015
1.6	Crouching Bird, Hidden Bunny	Sheila Dinsmore	April 10, 2015
1.7	The Fast and the Furiously Happy	Nicole Demerse	April 17, 2015
1.8	A River Leaks Through it	Sheila Dinsmore	April 20, 2015
1.9	Ghost Town	Nicole Demerse	April 21, 2015
1.10	Guardian of the Sandcastle	Amy Benham	April 22, 2015
1.11	Foiled Again	Brendan Russell	April 23, 2015
1.12	Clown Around	Diana Moore	April 24, 2015
1.13	Treasure Trap	Brendan Russell	April 27, 2015
1.14	Sleeping Giant	Dave Dias	April 28, 2015
1.15	Volcano Escape	Bob Ardiel	April 29, 2015
1.16	Stinky Business	Kristen McGregor	May 21, 2015
1.17	Journey to the Cave of Wonders	Diana Moore	May 22, 2015
1.18	Jurassic Pet	John Van Bruggen	May 25, 2015
1.19	Staying on Track	John Van Bruggen	May 26, 2015
1.20	Reach for the Sky	Bob Ardiel	June 23, 2015
1.21	To the Rescue	Dave Dias	June 24, 2015
1.22	Monster Hunters	Sheila Dinsmore	June 25, 2015
1.23	Treasure X	John Van Bruggen	June 26, 2015
1.24	Dungeons and Owls	Amy Benham	July 30, 2015
1.25	Tree of a Kind	Kristen McGregor	July 31, 2015
1.26	Landing Impossible	Diana Moore	August 10, 2015
1.27	Monkey Sunshine	Lienne Sawatsky & Dan Williams	August 4, 2015
1.28	Fly Me to Balloon	Amy Benham	August 5, 2015
1.29	Slime Busters	Diana Moore	August 6, 2015
1.30	Safari Stampede	Diana Moore	August 7, 2015
1.31	Eight Arms are Better Than Two	Ben Joseph	September 21, 2015
1.32	Mine, All Mine	Amy Benham	September 23, 2015
1.33	Mermaid Mayhem	Diana Moore	September 23, 2015
1.34	Frankensquawk	Diana Moore	September 24, 2015
1.35	Bee-licious	Brendan Russell	September 25, 2015
1.36	Ghost Ship	Diana Moore	September 28, 2015
1.37	Dragon Coaster	Shawn Kalb	September 29, 2015
1.38	Really, Really, Really Deep Under the Sea	Amy Benham	October 25, 2015
1.39	Twinkle, Twinkle Little Meteorite	Bob Ardiel	September 30, 2015
1.40	Magic Hat-Astrophe	Shawn Kalb	November 25, 2015
1.41	Super Crime Fighters	J.J. Johnson	November 26, 2015
1.42	Fairy Trap	Amy Benham	November 27, 2015
1.43	Outer Space Trek	Martha Sepulveda	November 30, 2015
1.44	Carrot Thief	Amy Benham	December 1, 2015
1.45	Anthill Attack	Brendan Russell	December 2, 2015
1.46	Planet of the Robot Baby	Ben Joseph	December 3, 2015
1.47	Time Out	Amy Benham	December 4, 2015
1.48	Ice Ninjas	Amy Benham	January 8, 2016
1.49	Pyramid Party	Diana Moore	January 10, 2016
1.50	Runaway Snowball	Bob Ardiel	January 11, 2016
1.51	Sandnado	Diana Moore	January 12, 2016
1.52	Monster Trucks	Diana Moore	January 31, 2016

== Broadcast ==
Chirp premiered on March 6, 2015 on CBC, and September 14, 2015 on Tiny Pop, and on November 1 on JimJam, before being cancelled. From September 25, 2017 through January 29, 2021, the series aired on the Qubo Channel, before it closed operations.
