= Giver (TV series) =

- Host Michael, designing with kids
- Genre: Children's, reality
- Starring: Michael Lagimodiere
- Country of origin: Canada
- Original language: English
- No. of seasons: 4
- No. of episodes: 43

Production
- Executive producers: Blair Powers, Matt Bishop, J.J. Johnson
- Producers: Rennata Lopez, Kristen McGregor
- Production locations: Ontario, Canada
- Running time: 22 minutes
- Production company: Sinking Ship Entertainment

Original release
- Network: TVOntario (Canada); Qubo (US)
- Release: April 17, 2012 – June 28, 2017

Giver is a Canadian children's television series, which premiered on TVOntario's TVOKids programming block, airing from April 17, 2012 to June 28, 2017. Hosted by Michael Lagimodiere, each episode enlists a team of local children to assist in creating, designing and building a new or renovated public park in an Ontario community, in collaboration with professional designers and contractors.

To celebrate Canada's 150th birthday Giver 150 was slated to release on July 1, 2017. Giver 150 set to build the largest playground in the country, to be located in Ottawa at Mooney Bay. Over 400 volunteers ranging from kids to adults from all over the country helped build the playground. The 50,000 square foot playground is shaped like Canada and has different play space representing each of the country's provinces and territories.

The series is a three-time Canadian Screen Award nominee for Children's or Youth Non-Fiction Program, at the 1st Canadian Screen Awards in 2013, the 3rd Canadian Screen Awards in 2015 and the 4th Canadian Screen Awards in 2016. The show won a Daytime Emmy Award at the 45th Annual Daytime Emmy Awards for "Outstanding Education or Informational Series".

== Episodes ==
Season	Episode	Title	TVO Airdate
1	1	Batawa Dinosaur Park	4/17/2012
1	2	Fergus Dog Park	4/24/2012
1	3	Guelph Circus Park	5/1/2012
1	4	Hamilton Future Park	5/8/2012
1	5	Newmarket Car Park	5/15/2012
1	6	Goderich Butterly Park	5/22/2012
1	7	Niagara Falls Water Park	5/29/2012
1	8	Hamilton Science Park	6/5/2012
1	9	Hawksville Sandbox Park	6/12/2012
1	10	Etobicoke Nature Park	6/19/2012
1	11	Gower Obstacle Park	6/26/2012
1	12	Kemptville Skate Park	7/3/2012
1	13	Georgina Island Chipewa Park	7/10/2012
2	1	Toronto I Love Toronto Park	4/30/2014
2	2	Sarnia Music Park	5/7/2014
2	3	Thunder Bay Sleeping Giant Park	5/14/2014
2	4	Parry Sound Camp Park	5/21/2014
2	5	Niagara Falls Boat Park	5/28/2014
2	6	Linwood Gnome Park	6/4/2014
2	7	Scarborough World Park	6/11/2014
2	8	Port Hope Ganaraska Trail School Park	6/18/2014
2	9	Waubaushene Sawmill Park	6/25/2014
2	10	Monkton Farm Park	7/2/2014
3	1	Strathroy-Caradoc Train Park	4/13/2015
3	2	Victoria Harbour Firefighter Park	4/20/2015
3	3	Cambridge Carnival Park	4/27/2015
3	4	Algonquin Highlands Tree House Park	5/4/2015
3	5	Ingersoll Cheese Park	5/11/2015
3	6	Toronto T-Rex Park	5/18/2015
3	7	Emsdale Alphabet Park	5/25/2015
3	8	Amherstberg Sports Park	6/1/2015
3	9	Leamington Pizza Park	6/8/2015
3	10	Hamilton Hammer Park	6/15/2015
4	1	We're building Ontario	4/26/2017
4	2	We're building Quebec	5/3/2017
4	3	We're building Nova Scotia and New Brunswick	5/10/2017
4	4	We're building Manitoba	5/17/2017
4	5	We're building Northwest Territories and Yukon	5/24/2017
4	6	We're building British Columbia and Prince Edward Island	5/31/2017
4	7	We're building Alberta and Saskatchewan	6/7/2017
4	8	We're building Newfoundland and Labrador	6/14/2017
4	9	We're building Nunavut	6/21/2017
4	10	Giver's Celebrating Canada	6/28/2017

== Awards and nominations ==
Year	Award	Category	Recipient	Result
2013	Kidscreen Awards	Best Kids Companion Website	Giver	Nominated
2013	Canadian Screen Awards	Best Children or Youth's Non-Fiction Series	Giver	Nominated
2013	Canadian Screen Awards	Best Host in a Children's Series	Michael Lagimodiere	Nominated
2013	Youth Media Alliance	Best Convergent Website	Giver	Nominated
2013	Youth Media Alliance	Best Television Program, All Genres, Ages 6–8 (Newmarket- Car Park)	Giver	Won
2015	Canadian Screen Awards	Best Children's or Youth Non-Fiction Program or Series	Giver	Nominated
2016	Canadian Screen Awards	Best Children's or Youth Non-Fiction Program or Series	Giver	Nominated
2016	Canadian Screen Awards	Best Host in a Children's Series	Michael Lagimodiere	Nominated
2017	Youth Media Alliance	Best Program, Live Action, Ages 9 +	Giver	Nominated
2018	Daytime Emmy Awards	Outstanding Education or Informational Series	Giver	Won
2018	Rockie Awards	Children & Youth - Non Fiction Series	Giver	Won
2019	Youth Media Alliance	Award of Excellence, Best Interactive Content - Ages 6–9	Giver 150	Nominated
