= J. J. Johnson (producer) =

Canadian television writer and producer

James Anthony Johnson, known professionally as J. J. Johnson, is a Canadian-born writer, director, executive producer, and founding member of Sinking Ship Entertainment. He is the creator of children's television programmes, including This is Daniel Cook, Dino Dana and Endlings. He also serves on the Youth Media Alliance board as a co-chair.

== Early life ==
One of four children, Johnson grew up in Elmira, Ontario and started experimenting with film and media in his final year of high school. Johnson was in the running for school president when he and two friends made a Saturday Night Live inspired video featuring Supermarket Sweep host Tino Monte. He won the election and through this victory he realized the power of media.

== Career ==
J. J. Johnson attended Ryerson University's RTA School of Media and graduated in 2002 along with fellow Sinking Ship Entertainment founders, Blair Powers and Matt Bishop. In their final year, Johnson and Powers pitched a project and tried to convince their peers to pick up the remaining crew roles. A classmate warned others who were interested to avoid joining as it'd be like "joining a sinking ship". The two friends registered a company in the same name later that day.

After graduating, Johnson worked at a talent agency where he met Daniel Cook, who became the inspiration behind This is Daniel Cook which debuted in 2004 with Sinking Ship Entertainment. Since then, Johnson has created and directed several popular shows such as Dino Dana, Endlings and Lockdown.

In January 2006, the operations of Sinking Ship Entertainment moved from Johnson's apartment to offices in Toronto.

On November 23, 2014, Sinking Ship Entertainment announced they would be co-producing Odd Squad along with Fred Rogers Productions for PBS Kids. The show went on to win several Daytime Emmy Awards which lead to the creation of Odd Squad Mobile Unit.

In 2021, he announced he would be working alongside Apple TV+ and the Jane Goodall Institute to create Jane, a kids' series that will follow a girl named Jane Garcia, a 10-year-old with an active imagination. Previously, Johnson had worked alongside Apple TV+ and Sesame Workshop to produce the reboot of the 1990's kids' series Ghostwriter.

== Filmography ==
Year	Title
2004	This is Daniel Cook
2006	This is Emily Yeung
2006	I Dare You
2006	Roll Play
2007	Are We There Yet?: World Adventures
2010	Dino Dan
2012	Giver
2013	This is Scarlett and Isaiah
2013	Dino Dan: Trek's Adventures
2014	Odd Squad
2015	Chirp
2016	Odd Squad: The Movie
2017	Dino Dana
2020	Endlings
2020	Dino Dana The Movie
2021	Lockdown
2023	Jane

== Awards, nominations and honors ==
Year	Award	Category	Work	Result	Ref
2013	1st Canadian Screen Awards	Best Pre-School Program or Series	Are We There Yet?: World Adventure	Nominated	
2013	1st Canadian Screen Awards	Best Children's or Youth Non-Fiction Program or Series	Giver	Nominated	
2015	3rd Canadian Screen Awards	Best Children's or Youth Non-Fiction Program or Series	Giver	Nominated	
2015	3rd Canadian Screen Awards	Best Direction in a Children's or Youth Program or Series	This Is Scarlett and Isaiah	Nominated	
2015	3rd Canadian Screen Awards	Best Writing in a Children's or Youth Program or Series	Dino Dan: Trek's Adventures	Nominated	
2015	Daytime Emmy Awards	Outstanding Pre-School Children's Series	Dino Dan: Trek's Adventures	Won	
2015	Daytime Emmy Awards	Outstanding Directing in a Children's or Pre-School Children's Series	Odd Squad	Won	
2016	4th Canadian Screen Awards	Best Pre-School Program or Series	Odd Squad	Won	
2016	4th Canadian Screen Awards	Best Children's or Youth Non-Fiction Program or Series	Giver	Nominated	
2016	4th Canadian Screen Awards	Best Children's or Youth Fiction Program or Series	Annedroids	Nominated	
2016	4th Canadian Screen Awards	Best Writing in a Children's or Youth Program or Series	Annedroids	Nominated	
2016	4th Canadian Screen Awards	Best Direction in a Children's or Youth Program or Series	Annedroids	Nominated	
2016	Daytime Emmy Awards	Outstanding Directing in a Children's or Pre-School Children's Series	Odd Squad	Won	
2017	5th Canadian Screen Awards	Best Children's or Youth Fiction Program or Series	Odd Squad: The Movie	Won	
2017	5th Canadian Screen Awards	Best Direction in a Children's or Youth Program or Series	Odd Squad	Nominated	
2017	5th Canadian Screen Awards	Best TV Movie or Limited Series	Odd Squad: The Movie	Nominated	
2018	6th Canadian Screen Awards	Best Children's or Youth Fiction Program or Series	Odd Squad	Won	
2018	6th Canadian Screen Awards	Best Cross-Platform Project - Children's and Youth	Odd Squad	Won	
2018	6th Canadian Screen Awards	Best Direction, Children's or Youth	Dino Dana: "Mega Tooth"	Nominated	
2018	6th Canadian Screen Awards	Best Direction, Children's or Youth	Odd Squad: "The Cherry On-Top-Inator / Sir"	Nominated	
2018	6th Canadian Screen Awards	Best Pre-School Program or Series	Dino Dana	Nominated	
2018	6th Canadian Screen Awards	Best Cross-Platform Project - Children's and Youth	Annedroids	Nominated	
2018	Daytime Emmy Awards	Outstanding Education or Informational Series	Giver	Won	
2019	7th Canadian Screen Awards	Best Children's or Youth Fiction Program or Series	Odd Squad	Won	
2019	7th Canadian Screen Awards	Best Pre-School Program or Series	Dino Dana	Won	
2019	7th Canadian Screen Awards	Best Cross-Platform Project - Children's and Youth	Dino Dana	Won	
2019	7th Canadian Screen Awards	Best Direction in a Children's or Youth Program or Series	Odd Squad	Won	
2019	7th Canadian Screen Awards	Best Writing in a Children's or Youth Program or Series	Dino Dana	Nominated	
2019	Daytime Emmy Awards	Outstanding Directing in a Children's, Pre-school Children's or Family Viewing Program	Odd Squad: World Turned Odd	Won	
2019	Daytime Emmy Awards	Outstanding Children's or Family Viewing Program	Odd Squad	Won	
2020	8th Canadian Screen Awards	Best Direction in a Children's or Youth Program or Series	Dino Dana	Nominated	
2020	Daytime Emmy Awards	Outstanding Children's or Family ViewingOutstanding Children's or Family Viewing Series	Ghostwriter	Won	
2021	9th Canadian Screen Awards	Best Writing, Web Program or Series	Lockdown	Nominated	
2021	9th Canadian Screen Awards	Best Children's or Youth Fiction Program or Series	Endlings	Nominated	
2021	9th Canadian Screen Awards	Best Children's or Youth Fiction Program or Series	Odd Squad Mobile Unit	Won	
2021	9th Canadian Screen Awards	Best Writing, Children's or Youth	Endlings	Nominated	
2022	10th Canadian Screen Awards	Best Children's or Youth Fiction Program or Series	Endlings	Nominated	
2022	10th Canadian Screen Awards	Best Children's or Youth Fiction Program or Series	Lockdown	Nominated	
2022	10th Canadian Screen Awards	Best Children's or Youth Fiction Program or Series	Odd Squad Mobile Unit	Nominated	
2022	10th Canadian Screen Awards	Best Directing, Children's or Youth	Odd Squad Mobile Unit: "H2 Oh No/In Your Dreams"	Nominated	
2022	10th Canadian Screen Awards	Immersive Experience, Nonfiction	Fossil Hunt	Nominated	
