= I Dare You (Canadian TV program) =

Canadian children's television series

- Genre: Children's
- Written by: J. J. Johnson
- Directed by: J. J. Johnson
- Presented by: Daniel Cook
- Country of origin: Canada
- Original language: English
- No. of seasons: 2
- No. of episodes: 39

Production
- Executive producers: Mark J.W. Bishop; Matthew Hornburg
- Producers: J. J. Johnson; Blair Powers; Matthew J.R. Bishop
- Running time: 2 minutes
- Production companies: Marblemedia; Sinking Ship Productions

Original release
- Network: TVOntario; Access; Knowledge Network; SCN
- Release: September 4, 2006 – January 13, 2007

I Dare You is a Canadian children's television program hosted by Daniel Cook that aired between September 4, 2006 and January 13, 2007. Cook dares viewers to participate in three physical exercises. At the end of the program all three movements are combined. The program aims to encourage physical activity, not simply passive viewing. Each episode ends with Cook eating healthy food, such as fruit or milk. The program aired for two seasons.

== Episodes ==
=== Season 1 (2006) ===
1. March and Hop
2. The Plank March
3. Thiathlon: Summer
4. V Step
5. Dice V
6. Dice Jumps
7. Grapevine
8. Chugs
9. Knees Up
10. Butt Kicks
11. The Crab
12. Bicycle
13. Monkey
14. Squish the Grape
15. Twist
16. Dig for Dinosaurs
17. Balance
18. Skipping
19. Jumping
20. Karate Kicks
21. Arm Punches
22. Rowing
23. Basketball
24. Clapper
25. Goalie
26. Funky Chicken

=== Season 2 (2007) ===
1. Skiing
2. Snow Games
3. Baseball
4. Hockey
5. Track and Field
6. Astronaut
7. Firefighter
8. Superhero
9. Circus
10. T-Rex
11. Rock Band
12. Marching Band
13. Trains, Planes and Speedboats

== See also ==
- This Is Daniel Cook.
