= Japan Prize (NHK) =

The Japan Prize (日本賞, Nipponshō) is an international competition established by NHK in 1965 to recognize excellence in educational television. As of 2008, the Japan Prize now honors educational videos, movies, websites, games and other interactive audiovisual products along with television content.

== Origin and Evolution ==
Detailed introduction to the origin, background, and gradual evolution of the Japan Award over time and technological advancement. The shift from traditional television educational programming to digital and interactive media is highlighted and how this shift reflects the parallel development of educational methods with technological advances in society.

The original intent of the awards was to honor organizations and individuals that produce ground-breaking educational programming on television. Because of its special power to spread information and knowledge, television ascended to the role of an instructional instrument in the second part of the twentieth century, and its emphasis reflects that.

As the Internet and other digital technologies have grown in popularity, the Japan Awards have broadened its focus to encompass more than just television shows. Both the development of new technologies and the evolution of teaching methods have contributed to this shift. Adapting to the needs of learners in the digital age, the traditional classroom learning model is rapidly becoming more inclusive of multimedia materials, online platforms, and interactive content.

Also, the Japan Prize has changed over the years to show how serious people are about making high-quality education accessible to all. By identifying and honoring groundbreaking innovations that make good use of new technology to improve the educational experience, the Japan Prize encourages the growth and use of educational technology. The winning projects showcase the power of technology to transform traditional education by creating interactive learning tools and offering solutions for distance learning. These projects show how technology can make learning more personalized, engaging, and accessible.

To sum up, the Japan Award has transformed from its initial purpose into a global accolade that fully acknowledges advancements in educational media. In addition to tracking developments in tech, it guides and motivates new approaches to educational content development.

NHK Television has been at the forefront of producing innovative educational content, partly due to the inspiration and benchmark set by the Japan Prize winners. Or instance, NHK's "Design Ah!" is a children's educational program that encourages creativity and design thinking. This program, influenced by the innovative spirit of the Japan Prize, demonstrates how educational content can be engaging, informative, and visually appealing.

The "Virtual Reality Classroom" project leverages VR technology to create immersive learning experiences for students. Unlike traditional teaching methods that rely heavily on textbooks and static images, this VR classroom transports students to historically significant sites, inside the human body for biology lessons, or even outer space for astronomy education. This direct, immersive experience enhances students' understanding and retention of complex subjects.
