= Sinking Ship Entertainment =

Canadian television production company

- Type: Private
- Industry: Television production, Distribution
- Founded: 2004; 21 years ago
- Founders: J. J. Johnson; Blair Powers; Matt Bishop
- Headquarters: 1179 King St W, Toronto, Ontario, Canada; M6K 3C5
- Number of employees: 175 (2020)
- Divisions: Sinking Ship Distribution; Sinking Ship Interactive; Sinking Ship VFX; Sinking Ship Animation
- Website: https://www.sinkingship.ca/

Sinking Ship Entertainment is a Canadian-based production, distribution and interactive company and animation studio specializing in kids' live-action CGI blended series. The company's headquarters are located in Toronto, Ontario. Since its founding in 2004, Sinking Ship has produced over 500 hours of content and their distribution division has sold to over 200 countries internationally. The company was named #1 in production on Kidscreen's Hot 50 for 2020.

== History ==
Sinking Ship Entertainment was founded by Ryerson University graduates J. J. Johnson, Blair Powers, and Matt Bishop in 2004. The name "Sinking Ship" was chosen when Johnson and Powers were pitching a project in their final year at Ryerson and trying to convince their peers to pick up the remaining crew roles. A classmate warned a fellow classmate who was interested in not joining the team as i would be like joining a sinking ship.

In September 2004, Sinking Ship Entertainment debuted their first series, This Is Daniel Cook.. Cook's passion for dinosaurs inspired the creation of Dino Dan, their first live-action CGI blended series. The series was released in 2010 on TVOKids and led to the opening of the company's visual effects division.

In 2016, Sinking Ship Entertainment entered the feature film market with the release of Odd Squad: The Movie. Since then, SSE has also released the 2018 television special Odd Squad: World Turned Odd and Dino Dana: The Movie.

In February 2016, Sinking Ship Entertainment launched a distribution division after acquiring Picture Box Distribution.

On May 2, 2019, Sinking Ship launched an animation series division.

During the 2020 COVID-19 pandemic, Sinking Ship Entertainment produced Lockdown, a tween web series in partnership with YouTube Originals for Kids and Family. The series was filmed remotely through web cameras and smart phones.

In 2021, Sinking Ship partnered with Apple TV+ and the Jane Goodall Institute to produce a children's series called Jane about a girl who, with her friends, have imaginary play to save endangered animals.

== Original productions ==
- Annedroids (2013)
- Are We There Yet?: World Adventure (2007)
- Bookaboo (Seasons 3–4 only)
- Builder Brothers Dream Factory (2023)
- Chirp
- Dino Dan (2010–2019)
- Dino Dan: Trek's Adventures (2013)
- Dino Dana (2017–2020)
- Dino Dana: The Movie (2020)
- Dino Dex (2024–)
- Endlings (2020–2021)
- Ghostwriter (2019–2022)
- Giver (2012)
- Graveyard Rocks (2011)
- Hilo (TBA)
- I Dare You (2006–2007)
- Jane (2023-2025)
- Jubilee
- Lockdown (2020)
- Now You Know (2015)
- Odd Squad (2014–present)
- Odd Squad: The Movie (2016)
- Odd Squad: World Turned Odd (2018)
- Odd Squad Mobile Unit (2020)
- Odd Squad UK (2024-present)
- Playdate (2015)
- Roll Play (2006)
- The Jungle Room (2007)
- The Ocean Room (2009)
- This Is Daniel Cook. (2004)
- This Is Emily Yeung. (2006)
- This Is Scarlett and Isaiah. (2013)
- What's Inside? (2015)
