= Famous People Players =

Canadian black light theatre company

Famous PEOPLE Players
- Formation: June 1, 1974
- Type: Theatre group
- Purpose: Black light production
- Location: Toronto, Ontario, Canada
- Artistic director: Joanne Dupuy
- Notable members: Diane Dupuy C.M., O.Ont
- Website: famouspeopleplayers.com

Famous PEOPLE Players is a black light theatre company based in Toronto, Ontario, Canada that has toured internationally. It is a non-profit organization that is famous for bringing inclusion and integration for people with disabilities. Those individuals, which the company calls Players, share duties in dining room management, arts administration, and theatrical and visual arts performances.

Since inception, the company has paid homage to the work of famous people within its own theatrical context, hence the name Famous PEOPLE Players.

== History ==
Inspired by her vision of social inclusion, Diane Dupuy of Hamilton, Ontario received an Opportunity For Youth (OFY) grant to start FPP. This program was created by Prime Minister Pierre Trudeau to provide meaningful work experiences for Canadian youth in the early 1970s. On June 1, 1974, Famous PEOPLE Players (FPP) was founded.

At inception, the company consisted of Dupuy, an assistant, eleven performers, and Dupuy's mother Mary Gioberti Thornton; Thornton designed and built the costumes and props.

The company's original piece was Aruba Liberace, in which a life-size character of Liberace plays the piano. It is still the company's signature performance. Liberace attended a showing of Aruba Liberace, and was so impressed he invited FPP to perform with him in Las Vegas. The company debuted in Las Vegas at Las Vegas Hilton Hotel in October 1975; over the subsequent ten years, the company performed with Liberace both in Las Vegas and internationally.

As a result of the increasing popularity of Famous PEOPLE Players, the company was featured as regulars on CBC Television's 1976–1977 variety series, The Wolfman Jack Show; the network also later produced and aired Carnival of the Animals hosted by Canadian Actor Gordon Pinsent. In 1980, FPP was featured with the Rockettes at the re-opening of Radio City Music Hall in New York, where the Sorcerer Apprentice premiered.

In 1982, Famous PEOPLE Players was invited to perform in the People's Republic of China. The company's first Broadway Show, A Little Like Magic, opened at the Lyceum Theatre in New York City and ran for 49 performances in 1986. They returned to New York in 1994 for a 4-week run, under the sponsorship of Phil Collins and actor Paul Newman, where they performed the show A Little More Magic! In 2001, Famous PEOPLE Players were invited to Kobe, Japan to raise money for children who were orphaned in result of a Great Hanshin earthquake.

== Dine & Dream Theatre ==
In 1994, the company opened its original Dine & Dream Theatre on Sudbury Street in Toronto's West Queen West neighbourhood. Paul Newman funded the restaurant's development by donating a portion of the sale of Newman's Own salad dressing products and Phil Collins funded the theatre's sound system. In 2009, facing the demolition of its 25-year location for condo development, the company relocated to Etobicoke.

The current Dine & Dream Theatre is located at the company's Toronto west-end headquarters, which reopened with its first show on October 23, 2009. Guests first arrive to the restaurant for lunch/dinner, where they are served by the Players — who also perform in the show productions. After the meal, guests are led to the Phil Collins Theatre, where the show production is performed (the theatre's performance space is named in honour of the English musician Phil Collins, who became a patron of the company after seeing the troupe perform to his music).

It is currently Canada's only permanent, year-round venue devoted exclusively to blacklight theatre. It also holds the distinction of being English Canada's oldest continuously operating puppet theatre venue.

== Recognition ==
The troupe has been subject of numerous talk shows, specials and documentaries. A 1984 CBS movie-of-the-week entitled Special People was based on the company's early history. FPP then went on to perform at the Royal Alexandra Theatre (1990), which earned them Ed Mirvish's praise and friendship. A Little Like Magic, which detailed the company's operation and success, was an Emmy Award-winning documentary that hosted Ann-Margret. The company was also featured in the plot of an episode of the popular U.S. television drama 7th Heaven in 2002. A television special called "Blacklight Dreams" was aired on Bravo! CBC in 2004. They also appeared in the Rick Mercer's documentary on CBC in 2013.

== Diane Dupuy ==
President and Founder of Famous PEOPLE Players, Diane Dupuy, C.M., O.Ont is also a motivational speaker. She was invited by Deepak Chopra to be a guest speaker at the Alliance of New Humanity in Puerto Rico in 2008, where she spoke alongside former Vice President Al Gore.

Dupuy's accolades include:

- B'nai B'rith Women, Woman of the Year (1981)
- Order of Canada (1982)
- Ernest C. Manning Award for Merit (1984)
- Library of Congress Award (1988)
- Queen Elizabeth II Golden Jubilee Medal (2002)
- Ernest & Young Social Entrepreneur Award (2009)
- Queen Elizabeth II Diamond Jubilee Medal (2012)
- Global Television Local Hero (2013)
- Lifetime Achievement Award, Brilliant Minded Women (2024)
- Order of Ontario (2024)
- First Canada Frontrunner, Urban Economy Forum (2025)
- King Charles III Coronation Medal (2025)

She holds honorary degrees from the University of Windsor (1986), University of Trent (1988), University of Calgary (1991), University of Toronto (2001), and University of Brock (2001).

In tribute to her efforts in fostering social inclusion in Canada, the Maple Leaf Theatre Company produced a new, original musical based on the story of Diane's life and founding of Famous PEOPLE Players — called Changing The Label. It was written by Canadian historian and playwright, Gord Carruth, with music written in conjunction with Amy King, and directed by Willard Boudreau. It premiered on June 19, 2025 at the Dine & Dream Theatre.

Her mother, Mary Gioberti Thornton (1916–2019) also won accolades, including the Frederick Gardiner Award and the Queen Elizabeth II Diamond Jubilee Medal.

== Productions ==
Famous PEOPLE Players has created many productions over its 50-year history.

Leave the Porch Light On was the company's first original, full-length musical production and was created for the company's 25th-anniversary. The initial performance of Leave the Porchlight On was attended by the Governor General of Canada. The production is still occasionally performed at the company's theatre in Toronto and on tour. A sequel of sorts followed two years later, entitled Hide and Seek: A Game of Human Spirit and A.D.H.D.(Awesome Dreams with High Drama) The Musical.

Famous PEOPLE Players Productions
Name	First Performance	Last Performance
Aruba Liberace	1974	still performed
Sorcerer Apprentice	1980	1980
Scheherazade	1981	1981
A Little Like Magic	1985	still performed
Night On Bald Mountain	1986	1986
A Little More Magic	1994	2001
The Best of the Best	1994	2001
The Oldies But Goodies Show	1996	1998
A Magical Christmas	1997	2000
Leave the Porch Light On	1999	still performed
Rock Around The Clock	2000	still performed
Hide and Seek: A Game of Human Spirit	2001	2007
Jumpin' and Jiven'	2005	still performed
Shake, Rattle & Roll	2005	2005
Hollywood Rocks	2006	2006
On Broadway	2006	2006
Alice in Funky Land	2006	still performed
Good Rockin'	2007	still performed
Going Bananas	2008	still performed
Rock and Roll Heaven	2010	2015
A Black Light Night at the Opera	2012	2014
A.D.H.D.(Awesome Dreams with High Drama) The Musical	2014	2014
Rock & Roll Heaven	2015	2015
Under The Big Top	2015	2015
Mistletoe Magic	2015	2015
Great Balls of Fire	2015	2016
Too Darn Hot	2016	2016
TreeMendous	2016	2016
Shufflin' On Broadway	2017	still performed
Canada Stands Tall	2017	2017
Sleigh Bells Ring	2017	still performed
Rock This City	2017	2023
Made in Canada	2018	2018
A Rockin' Good Time	2018	still performed
Jingle Around the Clock!	2018	2019
Winter Wonderland	2019	2020
Flashback Fun	2024	2024
Believe in Magic	2024	2024
Deck the Halls	2024	2025
Twist & Shout	February 2025	June 2025
Changing the Label: a Musical	June 2025	June 2025
Joy to the World	November 2025	January 2026
