= Canadian Screen Award for Best Performance in a Children's or Youth Program or Series =

Annual Canadian television award

The Canadian Screen Award for Best Performance in a Children's or Youth Program or Series is a Canadian Screen Award that honours performances in English language children's television produced in Canada.

At the 12th Canadian Screen Awards in 2024, the award was split up for the first time into separate categories for lead and supporting performances.

== Winners and nominees ==
Winners in bold.

=== 1990s ===
Year	Nominee	Series	Ref
1993; 8th Gemini Awards
1993; 8th Gemini Awards	**Graham Greene**	**The Adventures of Dudley the Dragon: "Mr. Crabby Tree"**	
1993; 8th Gemini Awards	Michelle Beaudoin	Madison: "The Fire Fighter"	
1993; 8th Gemini Awards	Jackie Burroughs	The Adventures of Dudley the Dragon: "High Flying Dragon"	
1993; 8th Gemini Awards	Ernie Coombs	Mr. Dressup's 25th Anniversary	
1993; 8th Gemini Awards	Alyson Court	The Big Comfy Couch: "Funny Faces"	
1993; 8th Gemini Awards	Fred Penner	Fred Penner's Place: "Swinging"	
1994; 9th Gemini Awards
1994; 9th Gemini Awards	**Laura Bertram**	**Ready or Not: "Am I Perverted or What?"**	
1994; 9th Gemini Awards	Shawn Ashmore	Guitarman	
1994; 9th Gemini Awards	Denny Doherty	Theodore Tugboat: "George Ghost"	
1994; 9th Gemini Awards	Tina Keeper	For Angela	
1994; 9th Gemini Awards	Enuka Okuma	Madison: "The Girl Most Likely"	
1995; 10th Gemini Awards
1995; 10th Gemini Awards	**Ernie Coombs**	**Mr. Dressup: "It Goes On Top"**	
1995; 10th Gemini Awards	John Acorn	Acorn, the Nature Nut: "The Fast and Furious World of Tiger Beetles"	
1995; 10th Gemini Awards	Laura Bertram	Ready or Not: "Crater Face"	
1995; 10th Gemini Awards	Daniel DeSanto	Eric's World: "Horace in Love"	
1995; 10th Gemini Awards	Jan Rubeš	Lamb Chop in the Haunted Studio	
1996; 11th Gemini Awards
1996; 11th Gemini Awards	**Callum Keith Rennie**	**My Life as a Dog: "The Puck Stops Here"**	
1996; 11th Gemini Awards	Ben Foster	Flash Forward: "House Party"	
1996; 11th Gemini Awards	Shari Lewis	Lamb Chop's Special Chanukah	
1996; 11th Gemini Awards	Kathryn Long	Goosebumps: "The Haunted Mask"	
1997; 12th Gemini Awards
1997; 12th Gemini Awards	**Laura Bertram**	**Ready or Not: "Graduation"**	
1997; 12th Gemini Awards	Ben Foster	Flash Forward: "Presents"	
1997; 12th Gemini Awards	Meredith Henderson	The Adventures of Shirley Holmes: "The Case of the Second Sight"	
1997; 12th Gemini Awards	Jewel Staite	Flash Forward: "Curtain Call"	
1997; 12th Gemini Awards	Jonathan Torrens	Jonovision: "What Happened to You?"	
1998; 13th Gemini Awards
1998; 13th Gemini Awards	**Sarah Polley**	**Straight Up: "Mortifying"**	
1998; 13th Gemini Awards	Kevin Brauch	Stuff: "Triathlon"	
1998; 13th Gemini Awards	Merwin Mondesir	Straight Up: "Façade"	
1998; 13th Gemini Awards	Michael Moriarty	The Inventors' Specials: "Galileo: On the Shoulders of Giants"	
1998; 13th Gemini Awards	Jonathan Torrens	Jonovision: "Obnoxious Couples"	
1998; 13th Gemini Awards	Chris Wiggins	The Rink	
1999; 14th Gemini Awards
1999; 14th Gemini Awards	**Meredith Henderson**	**The Adventures of Shirley Holmes: "The Case of the Crooked Comic"**	
1999; 14th Gemini Awards	Brent Carver	Whiskers	
1999; 14th Gemini Awards	Corey Sevier	Lassie: "Full Circle"	
1999; 14th Gemini Awards	Jonathan Torrens	Jonovision: "Jonopalooza"	
1999; 14th Gemini Awards	Maurice Dean Wint	The Sweetest Gift	

=== 2000s ===
Year	Actor	Series	Ref
2000; 15th Gemini Awards
2000; 15th Gemini Awards	**Matt Frewer**	**Mentors: "A Transient, Shining Trouble"**	
2000; 15th Gemini Awards	Andrew Bush, Nikki Barnett, Kim D'Eon, Duane Hall, Michael Scholar Jr.	Street Cents: "Music"	
2000; 15th Gemini Awards	Elliot Page	Pit Pony: "Homecoming"	
2000; 15th Gemini Awards	Thomas Jay Ryan	The Artists' Specials: "Degas and the Dancer"	
2000; 15th Gemini Awards	Patty Sullivan	Let's Get Real: "Life at School"	
2001; 16th Gemini Awards
2001; 16th Gemini Awards	**Brendan Fletcher**	**Caitlin's Way: "The Easy Way"**	
2001; 16th Gemini Awards	Lindsay Felton	Caitlin's Way: "The Present, Part 1"	
2001; 16th Gemini Awards	Vanessa King	Edgemont: "This Song's for You"	
2001; 16th Gemini Awards	Tyler Kyte	Popular Mechanics For Kids: "In Deep Water"	
2001; 16th Gemini Awards	Lee Thompson Young	The Famous Jett Jackson: "On the Reel"	
2002; 17th Gemini Awards
2002; 17th Gemini Awards	**Gordon Greene**	**The Famous Jett Jackson: "Heroes"**	
2002; 17th Gemini Awards	Gary Farmer	Screech Owls: "Sacred Ground"	
2002; 17th Gemini Awards	Jonathan Malen	Screech Owls: "Face Off"	
2002; 17th Gemini Awards	Eric Peterson	Screech Owls	
2002; 17th Gemini Awards	Mark Rendall	Tales from the Neverending Story	
2003; 18th Gemini Awards
2003; 18th Gemini Awards	**Jake Epstein**	**Degrassi: The Next Generation: "Tears Are Not Enough"**	
2003; 18th Gemini Awards	Kristin Kreuk	Edgemont: "The Cold Light of Dawn"	
2003; 18th Gemini Awards	Stephen Ouimette	Mentors: "Such Stuff as Dreams Are Made On"	
2003; 18th Gemini Awards	Alison Pill	The Dinosaur Hunter	
2003; 18th Gemini Awards	Dominic Zamprogna	Edgemont: "The Cold Light of Dawn"	
2004; 19th Gemini Awards
2004; 19th Gemini Awards	**Elliot Page**	**Mrs. Ashboro's Cat**	
2004; 19th Gemini Awards	Tom Barnett	Mrs. Ashboro's Cat	
2004; 19th Gemini Awards	Lauren Collins	renegadepress.com: "Skin Deep"	
2004; 19th Gemini Awards	Jake Epstein	Degrassi: The Next Generation: "Should I Stay or Should I Go"	
2004; 19th Gemini Awards	Ali Mukaddam	Radio Free Roscoe: "The Awful Truth"	
2005; 20th Gemini Awards
2005; 20th Gemini Awards	**Ksenia Solo**	**renegadepress.com: "Can You See Me Now"**	
2005; 20th Gemini Awards	Daniel Cook	This Is Daniel Cook: "This is Daniel Cook Doing Magic"	
2005; 20th Gemini Awards	Alexz Johnson	Instant Star: "Won't Get Fooled Again"	
2005; 20th Gemini Awards	Laurence Leboeuf	15/Love: "Ghost of a Chance"	
2005; 20th Gemini Awards	Tatiana Maslany	renegadepress.com: "Giving Yourself Away"	
2005; 20th Gemini Awards	Tasha Pelletier	renegadepress.com: "Union"	
2006; 21st Gemini Awards
2006; 21st Gemini Awards	**Ksenia Solo**	**renegadepress.com: "Fear"**	
2006; 21st Gemini Awards	Paula Brancati	Dark Oracle: "Life Interrupted"	
2006; 21st Gemini Awards	Ishan Davé	renegadepress.com: "This Is Your Brain on Love"	
2006; 21st Gemini Awards	Meaghan Rath	15/Love: "Comfort Zone"	
2006; 21st Gemini Awards	Michael Seater	Life with Derek: "Grade-Point: Average"	
2007; 22nd Gemini Awards
2007; 22nd Gemini Awards	**Shenae Grimes**	**Degrassi: The Next Generation: "Eyes Without a Face Part 2"**	
2007; 22nd Gemini Awards	Magda Apanowicz	renegadepress.com: "Blackout" aka "Getting it Right"	
2007; 22nd Gemini Awards	Ishan Davé	renegadepress.com: "Sullengirl16"	
2007; 22nd Gemini Awards	Alexz Johnson	Instant Star: "I Fought the Law"	
2007; 22nd Gemini Awards	Bronson Pelletier	renegadepress.com: "The Third Wheel"	
2008; 23rd Gemini Awards
2008; 23rd Gemini Awards	**Alexz Johnson**	**Instant Star: "Let it Be"**	
2008; 23rd Gemini Awards	Magda Apanowicz	renegadepress.com: "Life Today"	
2008; 23rd Gemini Awards	Lauren Collins	Degrassi: The Next Generation: "Talking in Your Sleep"	
2008; 23rd Gemini Awards	Shane Kippel	Degrassi: The Next Generation: "Death or Glory Part 2"	
2008; 23rd Gemini Awards	Ashley Leggat	Life with Derek: "Allergy Season"	
2009; 24th Gemini Awards
2009; 24th Gemini Awards	**Michael Seater**	Life with Derek: "Happy New School Year"	
2009; 24th Gemini Awards	Paula Brancati	Degrassi: The Next Generation: "Fight the Power"	
2009; 24th Gemini Awards	Ali Eisner	Kids' Canada: "Favourite Foods"	
2009; 24th Gemini Awards	Stacey Farber	Degrassi: The Next Generation: "Paradise City - Part 3"	

=== 2010s ===
Year	Actor	Series	Ref
2010; 25th Gemini Awards
2010; 25th Gemini Awards	**Charlotte Arnold**	**Degrassi: The Next Generation: "Somebody"**	
2010; 25th Gemini Awards	Landon Liboiron	Degrassi: The Next Generation: "Waiting For a Girl Like You"	
2010; 25th Gemini Awards	Kayla Lorette	That's So Weird!: "Leaky Roof"	
2010; 25th Gemini Awards	Melinda Shankar	How to Be Indie: "How to Beat Father Time"	
2010; 25th Gemini Awards	Jamie Watson	Peep and the Big Wide World: "Magic Duck Dancing / Chirp Chirp, Tweet, Tweet, Chirp"	
2011; 26th Gemini Awards
2011; 26th Gemini Awards	**Jordan Todosey**	**Degrassi: The Next Generation: "My Body Is a Cage, Part 2"**	
2011; 26th Gemini Awards	Munro Chambers	The Latest Buzz: "The Extreme Shakespeare Issue"	
2011; 26th Gemini Awards	Ali Eisner	Kids' Canada: "Wowie Woah Woah"	
2011; 26th Gemini Awards	Ashley Leggat	Vacation with Derek	
2011; 26th Gemini Awards	Kate Trotter	Vacation with Derek	
2012; 1st Canadian Screen Awards
2012; 1st Canadian Screen Awards	**Melinda Shankar**	**How to Be Indie: "How to Be the Hero"**	
2012; 1st Canadian Screen Awards	Charlotte Arnold	Degrassi: "Rock Your Body, Part 2"	
2012; 1st Canadian Screen Awards	Dylan Everett	Degrassi: "Rusty Cage, Part 2"	
2012; 1st Canadian Screen Awards	Jahmil French	Degrassi: "Smash Into You"	
2012; 1st Canadian Screen Awards	Aislinn Paul	Degrassi: "Waterfalls, Part 2"	
2013; 2nd Canadian Screen Awards
2013; 2nd Canadian Screen Awards	**Dylan Everett**	**Degrassi: "Bitter Sweet Symphony, Part 1"**	
2013; 2nd Canadian Screen Awards	Munro Chambers	Degrassi: "Ray of Light, Part 2"	
2013; 2nd Canadian Screen Awards	Dylan Everett	Wingin it: "Forget About it"	
2013; 2nd Canadian Screen Awards	Brendan Meyer	Mr. Young: "Mr. Time"	
2013; 2nd Canadian Screen Awards	Michael Murphy	Life with Boys: "Young and Stupid with Boys"	
2014; 3rd Canadian Screen Awards
2014; 3rd Canadian Screen Awards	**Aislinn Paul**	**Degrassi: "My Own Worst Enemy"**	
2014; 3rd Canadian Screen Awards	Richard Harmon	If I Had Wings	
2014; 3rd Canadian Screen Awards	Christian Potenza	Total Drama All-Stars: "Heroes Vs. Villains"	
2014; 3rd Canadian Screen Awards	Brittany Raymond	The Next Step: "What'll I Do"	
2014; 3rd Canadian Screen Awards	Charlie Storwick	Some Assembly Required: "Realm of Raiders"	
2015; 4th Canadian Screen Awards
2015; 4th Canadian Screen Awards	**Aislinn Paul**	**Degrassi: "Give Me One Reason"**	
2015; 4th Canadian Screen Awards	Dalila Bela	Odd Squad: "Training Day"	
2015; 4th Canadian Screen Awards	Madison Ferguson	The Stanley Dynamic: "Stanley Sick Day"	
2015; 4th Canadian Screen Awards	Ana Golja	Full Out	
2015; 4th Canadian Screen Awards	Jordan Lockhart	Hi Opie!: "Not Ms. Doney"	
2016; 5th Canadian Screen Awards
2016; 5th Canadian Screen Awards	**Brittany Raymond**	**The Next Step**	
2016; 5th Canadian Screen Awards	Addison Holley	Annedroids	
2016; 5th Canadian Screen Awards	Sean Michael Kyer	Odd Squad	
2016; 5th Canadian Screen Awards	Jordan Lockhart	Hi Opie!	
2016; 5th Canadian Screen Awards	Jeni Ross	Lost & Found Music Studios	
2017; 6th Canadian Screen Awards
2017; 6th Canadian Screen Awards	**Ella Ballentine**	**L.M. Montgomery's Anne of Green Gables: Fire and Dew**	
2017; 6th Canadian Screen Awards	Amanda Arcuri	Degrassi: Next Class	
2017; 6th Canadian Screen Awards	Anna Cathcart	Odd Squad	
2017; 6th Canadian Screen Awards	Akiel Julien	The Next Step	
2017; 6th Canadian Screen Awards	Michela Luci	Dino Dana	
2018; 7th Canadian Screen Awards
2018; 7th Canadian Screen Awards	**Anna Cathcart**	**Odd Squad**	
2018; 7th Canadian Screen Awards	Saara Chaudry	Dino Dana	
2018; 7th Canadian Screen Awards	Millie Davis	Odd Squad	
2018; 7th Canadian Screen Awards	Isaac Kragten	Odd Squad	
2018; 7th Canadian Screen Awards	Michela Luci	Dino Dana	
2019; 8th Canadian Screen Awards
2019; 8th Canadian Screen Awards	**Saara Chaudry**	**Dino Dana**	
2019; 8th Canadian Screen Awards	Saara Chaudry	Holly Hobbie	
2019; 8th Canadian Screen Awards	Hunter Dillon	Holly Hobbie	
2019; 8th Canadian Screen Awards	Kate Moyer	Holly Hobbie	
2019; 8th Canadian Screen Awards	Tomaso Sanelli	Creeped Out	

=== 2020s ===
Year	Actor	Series	Ref
2020; 9th Canadian Screen Awards
2020; 9th Canadian Screen Awards	**Saara Chaudry**	**Dino Dana**	
2020; 9th Canadian Screen Awards	Lilly Bartlam	Detention Adventure	
2020; 9th Canadian Screen Awards	Ruby Jay	Holly Hobbie	
2020; 9th Canadian Screen Awards	Simone Miller	Detention Adventure	
2020; 9th Canadian Screen Awards	Tomaso Sanelli	Detention Adventure	
2021; 10th Canadian Screen Awards
2021; 10th Canadian Screen Awards	**Saara Chaudry**	**Lockdown**	
2021; 10th Canadian Screen Awards	Kamaia Fairburn	Endlings	
2021; 10th Canadian Screen Awards	Valentina Herrera	Odd Squad Mobile Unit	
2021; 10th Canadian Screen Awards	Alyssa Hidalgo	Odd Squad Mobile Unit	
2021; 10th Canadian Screen Awards	Michela Luci	Endlings	
2022; 11th Canadian Screen Awards
2022; 11th Canadian Screen Awards	**Saara Chaudry**	**Holly Hobbie**	
2022; 11th Canadian Screen Awards	Lilly Bartlam	Detention Adventure	
2022; 11th Canadian Screen Awards	Melanie Doane	Ukulele U	
2022; 11th Canadian Screen Awards	Jack Fulton	Detention Adventure	
2022; 11th Canadian Screen Awards	Alyssa Hidalgo	Odd Squad Mobile Unit	
2022; 11th Canadian Screen Awards	Simone Miller	Detention Adventure	
2022; 11th Canadian Screen Awards	Alina Prijono	Detention Adventure	
2022; 11th Canadian Screen Awards	Tomaso Sanelli	Detention Adventure	
2023; 12th Canadian Screen Awards
2023; 12th Canadian Screen Awards	**Leading Performance**		
2023; 12th Canadian Screen Awards	**Khalilah Brooks**	**Aunty B's House**	
2023; 12th Canadian Screen Awards	Mia Bella	Popularity Papers	
2023; 12th Canadian Screen Awards	Kaileen Chang	I Woke Up a Vampire	
2023; 12th Canadian Screen Awards	Glee Dango	Popularity Papers	
2023; 12th Canadian Screen Awards	Zoe Wiesenthal	Ruby and the Well	
2023; 12th Canadian Screen Awards	**Supporting Performance**		
2023; 12th Canadian Screen Awards	**Millie Davis**	**Popularity Papers**	
2023; 12th Canadian Screen Awards	Paula Boudreau	Ruby and the Well	
2023; 12th Canadian Screen Awards	Nendia Lewars	Aunty B's House	
2023; 12th Canadian Screen Awards	Claire Poon	Aunty B's House	
2024; 13th Canadian Screen Awards
2024; 13th Canadian Screen Awards	**Leading Performance**		
2024; 13th Canadian Screen Awards	**Veronika Slowikowska**	**Davey and Jonesie's Locker**	
2024; 13th Canadian Screen Awards	Mia Bella	Popularity Papers	
2024; 13th Canadian Screen Awards	Jaelynn Thora Brooks	Davey and Jonesie's Locker	
2024; 13th Canadian Screen Awards	Mia SwamiNathan	Wordsville	
2024; 13th Canadian Screen Awards	Zoe Wiesenthal	Ruby and the Well	
2024; 13th Canadian Screen Awards	**Supporting Performance**		
2024; 13th Canadian Screen Awards	**Josette Jorge**	**Ruby and the Well**	
2024; 13th Canadian Screen Awards	Lisa Berry	Beyond Black Beauty	
2024; 13th Canadian Screen Awards	Akiel Julien	Beyond Black Beauty	
2024; 13th Canadian Screen Awards	Michela Luci	Dino Dex	

== Best Performance in a Pre-School Program or Series ==
=== 1990s ===
Year	Nominee	Series	Ref
1997; 12th Gemini Awards
1997; 12th Gemini Awards	Graham Greene	The Adventures of Dudley the Dragon: "Dudley and the Tiny Raincloud"	
1997; 12th Gemini Awards	Taborah Johnson, Bob Dermer	Guess What?: "Frogs & Toads"	
1997; 12th Gemini Awards	John Pattison	Groundling Marsh: "Bah Hegdish"	
1998; 13th Gemini Awards
1998; 13th Gemini Awards	Rick Mercer	The Adventures of Dudley the Dragon: "The Last Dudley"	
1998; 13th Gemini Awards	Daniel Kash	The Adventures of Dudley the Dragon: "The Boy Who Cried Witch"	
1998; 13th Gemini Awards	Shari Lewis	The Charlie Horse Music Pizza: "My Dog Has Fleas"	
1998; 13th Gemini Awards	Sheila McCarthy	The Adventures of Dudley the Dragon: "The Pumpkin King"	
1998; 13th Gemini Awards	Mary Walsh	The Adventures of Dudley the Dragon: "Mr. Crabby Tree Falls in Love"	
1999; 14th Gemini Awards
1999; 14th Gemini Awards	Jayne Eastwood	Noddy: "The Trouble with Truman"	
1999; 14th Gemini Awards	Sean McCann	Noddy: "The Trouble with Truman"	
1999; 14th Gemini Awards	Robert Mills	Ruffus the Dog: "Around the World in 80 Days"	
1999; 14th Gemini Awards	James Rankin	Scoop and Doozie: "Take the Cake"	
1999; 14th Gemini Awards	Bob Stutt	Sesame Park: "Episode 43"	

=== 2000s ===
Year	Actor	Series	Ref
2000; 15th Gemini Awards
2000; 15th Gemini Awards	Sheila McCarthy	Sesame Park: "Little Miss Muffet"	
2000; 15th Gemini Awards	Jayne Eastwood	Noddy: "Be Patient"	
2000; 15th Gemini Awards	Pier Kohl	Sesame Park: "Little Miss Muffet"	
2000; 15th Gemini Awards	Sean McCann	Noddy: "Slugger"	
2000; 15th Gemini Awards	Robert Mills	Ruffus the Dog: "Troll Under the Bridge"	
2000; 15th Gemini Awards	James Rankin	Scoop and Doozie: "Pie in the Sky"	
2001; 16th Gemini Awards
2001; 16th Gemini Awards	Eric Peterson	Sesame Park: "Old King Cole"	
2001; 16th Gemini Awards	Gisèle Corinthios	The Nook Counting Network: "9 Trucks"	
2001; 16th Gemini Awards	Pier Kohl	Sesame Park: "Louis At the Big Hill"	
2001; 16th Gemini Awards	Natasha LaForce	Polkaroo's Awesome ABCs: "The Not-So-Quiet Letter Q"	
2001; 16th Gemini Awards	James Rankin	Scoop and Doozie: "Mad As a Dozer"	
2002; 17th Gemini Awards
2002; 17th Gemini Awards	James Rankin	Scoop and Doozie: "Boo Who?"	
2002; 17th Gemini Awards	Gisèle Corinthios	The Nook Counting Network: "Jelly Donuts"	
2002; 17th Gemini Awards	Alyson Court, Michael Clarke	Get Set For Life	
2002; 17th Gemini Awards	Chris Knight	Scoop and Doozie	
2002; 17th Gemini Awards	Gillie Robic, John Eccleston, Rebecca Nagan, Wim Booth, Don Austen, Julie Westwood, Brian Herring	The Hoobs: "Rings"	
2002; 17th Gemini Awards	Charles Schott	Polka Dot Shorts	
2003; 18th Gemini Awards
2003; 18th Gemini Awards	Pier Kohl, Timothy Gosley, Jani Lauzon, Julie Burroughs, André Meunier, France Chevrette, Hugolin Chevrette Landesque	Wumpa's World: "Seal Got Your Tongue"	
2003; 18th Gemini Awards	Sayaka Karasugi, Elizabeth Olds, Jorden Morris, Keir Knight, Rick Jones, Jennifer Welsman	The Toy Castle: "Snowflakes/Ballerina Big Top/Little Rag Doll"	
2003; 18th Gemini Awards	Gillie Robic, Rebecca Nagan, Wim Booth, Don Austen, Julie Westwood, Brian Herring, Mark Jeffries	The Hoobs: "Beautiful"	
2004; 19th Gemini Awards
2004; 19th Gemini Awards	Jason Hopley, Jamie Shannon	Nanalan': "Free"	
2004; 19th Gemini Awards	Alyson Court	The Big Comfy Couch: "Clowning in the Rain"	
2004; 19th Gemini Awards	Gillie Robic, Rebecca Nagan, Wim Booth, Don Austen, Julie Westwood, Mark Jeffris, John Eccleston	The Hoobs: "Opera Singer"	
