= Canadian Screen Award for Best Writing in a Children's or Youth Program or Series =

Annual Canadian television award

The Canadian Screen Award for Best Writing in a Children's or Youth Program or Series is a Canadian Screen Award that honours writing in English language children's television produced in Canada.

== Winners and nominees ==
Winners in bold.

=== 1990s ===
Year	Nominee	Series	Ref
1994; 9th Gemini Awards
1994; 9th Gemini Awards	**Roger Fredericks, Louise Moon**	**Street Cents: "Hype"**	
1994; 9th Gemini Awards	Leila Basen	Ready or Not: "Am I Perverted or What?"	
1994; 9th Gemini Awards	S.M. Molitor, Don Arioli, Morton Ritts	The Busy World of Richard Scarry: "The Talking Bread/Couscous/The Three Fisherman"	
1994; 9th Gemini Awards	Richard Mortimer	AIDScare/AIDsCare	
1994; 9th Gemini Awards	David Preston	Are You Afraid of the Dark?: "The Tale of the Dream Girl"	
1995; 10th Gemini Awards
1995; 10th Gemini Awards	**Roger Fredericks, Louise Moon**	**Street Cents: "Music"**	
1995; 10th Gemini Awards	David Finley	Jim Henson's Dog City: "Doggy See, Doggy Do"	
1995; 10th Gemini Awards	Frazer McArter	Madison: "Stealing Home"	
1995; 10th Gemini Awards	Michael Mercer	Nilus the Sandman: The First Day	
1995; 10th Gemini Awards	David Preston	Bonjour Timothy	
1995; 10th Gemini Awards	Steve Westren	Groundling Marsh: "Snow Job"	
1996; 11th Gemini Awards
1996; 11th Gemini Awards	**Marlene Matthews**	**The Composer's Specials: "Handel's Last Chance"**	
1996; 11th Gemini Awards	Billy Brown, Dan Angel	Goosebumps: "The Cuckoo Clock of Doom"	
1996; 11th Gemini Awards	Heather Conkie	My Mother's Ghost	
1996; 11th Gemini Awards	Chris Haddock	Heck's Way Home	
1996; 11th Gemini Awards	Scott Peters	Are You Afraid of the Dark?: "The Tale of Station 109.1"	
1996; 11th Gemini Awards	Sugith Varughese	On My Mind: "The Secret Life of Goldfish"	
1997; 12th Gemini Awards
1997; 12th Gemini Awards	**Susin Nielsen**	**The Adventures of Shirley Holmes: "The Case of the Burning Building"**	
1997; 12th Gemini Awards	John Acorn	Acorn: The Nature Nut: "An Ol’ Anole or Two"	
1997; 12th Gemini Awards	Heather Conkie	Flash Forward: "Double Bill"	
1997; 12th Gemini Awards	Robert C. Cooper	Flash Forward: "Presents"	
1997; 12th Gemini Awards	Vicki Grant	Theodore Tugboat: "Hank’s Funny Feeling"	
1998; 13th Gemini Awards
1998; 13th Gemini Awards	**Raymond Storey**	**The Inventors' Specials: "Leonardo: A Dream of Flight"**	
1998; 13th Gemini Awards	Marty Chan	The Orange Seed Myth and Other Lies Mothers Tell	
1998; 13th Gemini Awards	Heather Conkie	The Inventors' Specials: "Galileo: On the Shoulders of Giants"	
1998; 13th Gemini Awards	Edwina Follows	Ready or Not: "Your Own Money"	
1998; 13th Gemini Awards	Karen Walton	Straight Up: "Gravity"	
1999; 14th Gemini Awards
1999; 14th Gemini Awards	**Pete Sauder, Ian James Corlett**	**Rolie Polie Olie: "Roll the Camera"**	
1999; 14th Gemini Awards	Victoria Grant	Scoop and Doozie: "Au Revoir Underpants"	
1999; 14th Gemini Awards	Dennis Foon	Jenny and the Queen of Light	
1999; 14th Gemini Awards	Louise Moon	Street Cents: "Fashion"	
1999; 14th Gemini Awards	John Pellatt, Kenn Scott	Ned's Newt: "Back to the Futile"	

=== 2000s ===
Year	Actor	Series	Ref
2000; 15th Gemini Awards
2000; 15th Gemini Awards	**Victoria Grant**	**Scoop and Doozie: "What Rubbish!"**	
2000; 15th Gemini Awards	Heather Conkie	The Artists' Specials: "Degas and the Dancer"	
2000; 15th Gemini Awards	Avrum Jacobson, Christel Kleitsch, Phoebe Gilman	Something from Nothing	
2000; 15th Gemini Awards	Robert Mills	Ruffus the Dog: "Troll Under the Bridge"	
2000; 15th Gemini Awards	John van Bruggen	Franklin: "Franklin and the Two Henrys"	
2001; 16th Gemini Awards
2001; 16th Gemini Awards	**Gerard Lewis**	**Mentors: "Klondike Daze"**	
2001; 16th Gemini Awards	Alex Pugsley	I Was A Sixth Grade Alien: "I am Larrabe Hicks!"	
2001; 16th Gemini Awards	Vito Viscomi	Yvon of the Yukon: "The Walrus Between Us"	
2001; 16th Gemini Awards	Ian Weir	Edgemont: "The Liar's Club"	
2002; 17th Gemini Awards
2002; 17th Gemini Awards	**Ali Marie Matheson, Jon Cooksey**	**The Santa Claus Brothers**	
2002; 17th Gemini Awards	Suzanne Bolch, John May	Our Hero: "The Comeback Issue"	
2002; 17th Gemini Awards	Bruce Kalish	Jett Jackson: The Movie	
2002; 17th Gemini Awards	Matthew Salsberg	Big Wolf on Campus: "Being Tommy Dawkins"	
2002; 17th Gemini Awards	Sib Ventress	The Famous Jett Jackson: "Something in the Air"	
2003; 18th Gemini Awards
2003; 18th Gemini Awards	**Peter Lauterman**	**The Zack Files: "Zackeo & Juliet"**	
2003; 18th Gemini Awards	Tassie Cameron, Jackie May	Fast Food High	
2003; 18th Gemini Awards	Conni Massing	Mentors: "The Tao of Hockey"	
2003; 18th Gemini Awards	Simon Racioppa, Richard Elliott	Moville Mysteries: "Big Toe, Big Evil"	
2004; 19th Gemini Awards
2004; 19th Gemini Awards	**Jason Hopley, Jamie Shannon**	**Nanalan': "Free"**	
2004; 19th Gemini Awards	Robert C. Cooper	The Impossible Elephant	
2004; 19th Gemini Awards	Jennifer Cowan	Edgemont: "Two Guys and a Baby"	
2004; 19th Gemini Awards	Shelley Scarrow, James Hurst, Nicole Demerse	Degrassi: "Accidents Will Happen"	
2004; 19th Gemini Awards	John Van Bruggen	Jacob Two-Two: "Jacob Two-Two and the Purloined Hockey Card"	
2004; 19th Gemini Awards	Ian Weir	Edgemont: "You Gotta Have Friends"	
2005; 20th Gemini Awards
2005; 20th Gemini Awards	**Derek Schreyer**	**15/Love: "Renewal"**	
2005; 20th Gemini Awards	Mary Crawford, Alan Templeton	King: "Stolen Voices"	
2005; 20th Gemini Awards	Ramelle Mair, David Acer, Barry Julien	Mystery Hunters: "Anastasia, Anna Anderson"	
2005; 20th Gemini Awards	Jana Sinyor, Heather Conkie	Dark Oracle: "Dark Oracle"	
2005; 20th Gemini Awards	Jordan Wheeler	renegadepress.com: "Dying to Connect"	
2006; 21st Gemini Awards
2006; 21st Gemini Awards	**Jordan Wheeler**	**renegadepress.com: "The Rez"**	
2006; 21st Gemini Awards	Richard Elliott, Simon Racioppa	Jane and the Dragon: "A Dragon's Tail"	
2006; 21st Gemini Awards	Dennis Heaton	Naughty Naughty Pets: "Sock It to Me"	
2006; 21st Gemini Awards	Bob McDonald, Ken Hewitt-White	Heads Up!: "How Do We Get Around in Space?"	
2006; 21st Gemini Awards	Steven Westren	Dragon: "Dragon Runs the Store"	
2007; 22nd Gemini Awards
2007; 22nd Gemini Awards	**Sara Snow**	**renegadepress.com: "Blackout"**	
2007; 22nd Gemini Awards	Trevor Cameron	Wapos Bay: The Series: "Something to Remember"	
2007; 22nd Gemini Awards	Seán Cullen	Grossology: "Fartzilla"	
2007; 22nd Gemini Awards	Ramelle Mair, David Acer	Mystery Hunters: "Giant Shark"	
2007; 22nd Gemini Awards	Gary Wheeler	Jacob Two-Two: "Jacob Two-Two and the Hockey Seat Hoopla"	
2008; 23rd Gemini Awards
2008; 23rd Gemini Awards	**Robert Pincombe, Shelley Hoffman, Karen Moonah**	**Iggy Arbuckle: "There's Something About Berries/Idle Worship"**	
2008; 23rd Gemini Awards	Emily Andras	Instant Star: "Like a Virgin"	
2008; 23rd Gemini Awards	Dennis Jackson	Wapos Bay: The Series: "The Guardians"	
2008; 23rd Gemini Awards	Bob McDonald	Heads Up!: "What Will Cars Look Like in the Future?"	
2008; 23rd Gemini Awards	Terry McGurrin	6Teen: "Silent Butt Deadly"	
2009; 24th Gemini Awards
2009; 24th Gemini Awards	**Steven Westren**	**My Friend Rabbit: "Frog on a Log"**	
2009; 24th Gemini Awards	Jeff Biederman	Life with Derek: "Just Friends"	
2009; 24th Gemini Awards	Richard Clark	Grossology: "The New Recruits"	
2009; 24th Gemini Awards	Sean Jara	The Latest Buzz: "The First Impressions Issue"	
2009; 24th Gemini Awards	Victor Nicolle, Dennis Heaton, Sandy Flanagan	Jibber Jabber: "Night of the Werewolf/Enter the Jelly"	

=== 2010s ===
Year	Actor	Series	Ref
2010; 25th Gemini Awards
2010; 25th Gemini Awards	**Trevor Cameron**	**Wapos Bay: The Series: "The Hardest Lesson"**	
2010; 25th Gemini Awards	Sheila Dinsmore and John De Klein	Busytown Mysteries: "The Sandcastle Squasher/The Strange Ski Tracks Mystery"	
2010; 25th Gemini Awards	Scott Fellows	Johnny Test: "Papa Johnny/The Johnnyminster Dog Show"	
2010; 25th Gemini Awards	Myra Fried, Steve Wright	Majority Rules!: "Becky Takes a Pass"	
2010; 25th Gemini Awards	Duncan McKenzie, Jerry Schaefer, Gary Pearson, Carolyn Taylor	That's So Weird!: "Background Music"	
2011; 26th Gemini Awards
2011; 26th Gemini Awards	**Simon Racioppa, Richard Elliott**	**Spliced: "Pink"**	
2011; 26th Gemini Awards	Seán Cullen	Almost Naked Animals: "Better Safe and Sorry"	
2011; 26th Gemini Awards	Michael Grassi	Degrassi: "My Body Is a Cage, Part 2"	
2011; 26th Gemini Awards	Philippe Ivanusic-Vallée, Davila LeBlanc	League of Super Evil: "Voltina"	
2011; 26th Gemini Awards	Anita Kapila	How to Be Indie: "How to Get Plugged In"	
2012; 1st Canadian Screen Awards
2012; 1st Canadian Screen Awards	**Frank van Keeken**	**Wingin' It: "Hands Solo"**	
2012; 1st Canadian Screen Awards	Paul Gardner	Gisèle's Big Backyard: "Movie Moments - Long 1"	
2012; 1st Canadian Screen Awards	Dennis Jackson, Melanie Jackson	Wapos Bay: Long Goodbyes	
2012; 1st Canadian Screen Awards	Terry McGurrin	Scaredy Squirrel: "From Rodent with Love"	
2012; 1st Canadian Screen Awards	Alex McIntosh	Things You Need To Know: "Weather"	
2013; 2nd Canadian Screen Awards
2013; 2nd Canadian Screen Awards	**Ramona Barckert**	**Degrassi: "Bitter Sweet Symphony, Part 2"**	
2013; 2nd Canadian Screen Awards	Claire Ross Dunn	Wingin' It: "Total Debate of the Heart"	
2013; 2nd Canadian Screen Awards	Lisa Hunter	Finding Stuff Out: "Solids, Liquid & Gases"	
2013; 2nd Canadian Screen Awards	Terry McGurrin	Scaredy Squirrel: "Safety Corner Conundrum"	
2013; 2nd Canadian Screen Awards	Steve Westren	Almost Naked Animals: "Sun Scream"	
2014; 3rd Canadian Screen Awards
2014; 3rd Canadian Screen Awards	**Matt Huether**	**Degrassi: "Unbelievable"**	
2014; 3rd Canadian Screen Awards	Alejandro Alcoba, Carling Tedesco	The Next Step: "Anything You Can Do, I Can Do Better"	
2014; 3rd Canadian Screen Awards	Philippe Ivanusic-Vallée	Oh No! It's an Alien Invasion: "Unitron / Dan the Man"	
2014; 3rd Canadian Screen Awards	J. J. Johnson, Christin Simms	Dino Dan: Trek's Adventures: "Cowboys vs. Dinosaurs / Survival of the Biggest"	
2014; 3rd Canadian Screen Awards	Michael Markus, Tim Stubinski	If I Had Wings	
2015; 4th Canadian Screen Awards
2015; 4th Canadian Screen Awards	**Matt Huether**	**Degrassi: "Give Me One Reason"**	
2015; 4th Canadian Screen Awards	J. J. Johnson, Christin Simms	Annedroids: "Parent Swap"	
2015; 4th Canadian Screen Awards	Edward Kay	Finding Stuff Out: "Poop"	
2015; 4th Canadian Screen Awards	Tim McKeon	Odd Squad: "Training Day"	
2015; 4th Canadian Screen Awards	Jesse Shamata, Evany Rosen, Eric Toth	Gaming Show (In My Parents' Garage): "All Night Long"	
2016; 5th Canadian Screen Awards
2016; 5th Canadian Screen Awards	**Alejandro Alcoba**	**Degrassi: Next Class: "#YesMeansYes"**	
2016; 5th Canadian Screen Awards	Adam Barken	Bruno & Boots: Go Jump in the Pool	
2016; 5th Canadian Screen Awards	Ken Cuperus	The Stanley Dynamic: "The Stanley Wild Weekend"	
2016; 5th Canadian Screen Awards	J. J. Johnson, Christin Simms	Annedroids: "The Mother of Invention Part 2")	
2016; 5th Canadian Screen Awards	Tim McKeon	Odd Squad: "The First Day"	
2017; 6th Canadian Screen Awards
2017; 6th Canadian Screen Awards	**Adam Peltzman, Tim McKeon**	**Odd Squad: "Drop Gadget Repeat/20 Questions"**	
2017; 6th Canadian Screen Awards	Susan Coyne	L.M. Montgomery's Anne of Green Gables: Fire and Dew	
2017; 6th Canadian Screen Awards	Sarah Glinski	Degrassi: Next Class: "#IRegretNothing"	
2017; 6th Canadian Screen Awards	Matt Huether	Degrassi: Next Class: "#ImSleep"	
2017; 6th Canadian Screen Awards	Rachael Schaefer	The Next Step: "A New Regime"	
2018; 7th Canadian Screen Awards
2018; 7th Canadian Screen Awards	**Mark De Angelis, Leah Gotcsik**	**Odd Squad: "Where There's a Wolf, There's a Way / New Jacket Required"**	
2018; 7th Canadian Screen Awards	Claire Cappelletti	Finding Stuff Out: "The Nose Knows"	
2018; 7th Canadian Screen Awards	J. J. Johnson, Christin Simms, Nathalie Younglai	Dino Dana: "A Dino Never Forgets / Claw and Order"	
2018; 7th Canadian Screen Awards	Penelope Laurence	Finding Stuff Out: "Noisy Bodies"	
2018; 7th Canadian Screen Awards	Karen McClellan	The Next Step: "Twinkle Toes"	
2019; 8th Canadian Screen Awards
2019; 8th Canadian Screen Awards	**Christin Simms, Amish Patel, J. J. Johnson**	**Dino Dana: "Dino Prints"**	
2019; 8th Canadian Screen Awards	Kate Hewlett	Backstage: "Not for Sale"	
2019; 8th Canadian Screen Awards	Vivian Lin	Bajillionaires: "Good Whale Hunting"	
2019; 8th Canadian Screen Awards	Sarah Glinski	Holly Hobbie: "The Mad Muralist"	
2019; 8th Canadian Screen Awards	Cole Bastedo	Holly Hobbie: "The Rabble Rouser"	

=== 2020s ===
Year	Writer	Series	Ref
2020; 9th Canadian Screen Awards
2020; 9th Canadian Screen Awards	**Jessica Meya**	**Detention Adventure: "Hitting a Wall"**	
2020; 9th Canadian Screen Awards	Alejandro Alcoba	Holly Hobbie: "The Puzzled Peacemaker"	
2020; 9th Canadian Screen Awards	J. J. Johnson, Christin Simms	Endlings: "The End is the Beginning is the End"	
2020; 9th Canadian Screen Awards	Karen McClellan	The Next Step: "The Comeback Kid"	
2020; 9th Canadian Screen Awards	Adam Peltzman, Stephanie Kaliner	Odd Squad Mobile Unit: "Mr. Unpredictable/Down the Tubes"	
2021; 10th Canadian Screen Awards
2021; 10th Canadian Screen Awards	**Mark De Angelis, Eric Toth**	**Odd Squad Mobile Unit: "Mission O Possible / Nature of the Sandbeast"**	
2021; 10th Canadian Screen Awards	Lisa Codrington	Lockdown: "The Confession"	
2021; 10th Canadian Screen Awards	Rennata López	My Home, My Life: "Israel-My Hip Hoppin' Family"	
2021; 10th Canadian Screen Awards	John May, Suzanne Bolch	16 Hudson: "Welcome "	
2021; 10th Canadian Screen Awards	Nicole Stamp	Lockdown: "Guilty Until Proven Innocent"	
2022; 11th Canadian Screen Awards
2022; 11th Canadian Screen Awards	**Ramona Barckert**	**The Hardy Boys: "Captured"**	
2022; 11th Canadian Screen Awards	Carmen Albano	Detention Adventure: "First Impressionisms"	
2022; 11th Canadian Screen Awards	Amy Cole	The Next Step: "One Song Glory"	
2022; 11th Canadian Screen Awards	Joe Kicak	Detention Adventure: "See You Later"	
2022; 11th Canadian Screen Awards	Lisa Rose Snow	Detention Adventure: "Pranks, Lies and Videotape"	
2023; 12th Canadian Screen Awards
2023; 12th Canadian Screen Awards	**Chris Pozzebon**	**The Hardy Boys: "At the Old House"**	
2023; 12th Canadian Screen Awards	Cole Bastedo	Home Sweet Rome: "Coconut Dog Day"	
2023; 12th Canadian Screen Awards	Vivian Lin, Maryan Haye	Popularity Papers: "Teamwork Makes the Scene Work"	
2023; 12th Canadian Screen Awards	Vivian Lin, Amanda Brooke Perrin	Popularity Papers: "New School, New Start"	
2023; 12th Canadian Screen Awards	Courtney Jane Walker, Matt Huether	Home Sweet Rome: "Tanti Auguri A Lucy"	
2024; 13th Canadian Screen Awards
2024; 13th Canadian Screen Awards	**Kara Harun, Cheryl Meyer**	**Beyond Black Beauty: "Everybody Hurts"**	
2024; 13th Canadian Screen Awards	Mark De Angelis	Odd Squad UK: "Odd Ones In Part I / Odd Ones In Part II"	
2024; 13th Canadian Screen Awards	JP Larocque, Vivian Lin	Popularity Papers: "Let's Sick Together"	
2024; 13th Canadian Screen Awards	Vivian Lin	Popularity Papers: "The Wonderful Wizard of Mapleview, Part 2"	
2024; 13th Canadian Screen Awards	Evany Rosen	Davey and Jonesie's Locker: "You Don't Belong Here"	
