= Canadian Screen Award for Best Children's or Youth Fiction Program or Series =

Annual Canadian television award

The Canadian Screen Award for Best Children's or Youth Fiction Program or Series is an annual television award, presented by the Academy of Canadian Cinema and Television to honour the year's best scripted children's television programming produced in Canada.

The award was first presented in 2002 as part of the Gemini Awards program. Prior to 2002, a single Gemini Award for Best Children's or Youth Program or Series was presented, inclusive of both fiction and non-fiction programming; in 2002, the award was split into separate categories for fiction and non-fiction programming.

Since 2013, the award has been presented as part of the Canadian Screen Awards.

== Winners and nominees ==
Due to the distinction between the former Gemini Awards, which were usually presented in the late fall of the same year that the awards were presented for, and the current Canadian Screen Awards, which are presented early in the following year, awards are listed below under the year of eligibility rather than the year of presentation.

=== 2000s ===
==== 2002 ====
- The Famous Jett Jackson
- Big Wolf on Campus
- Incredible Story Studio
- Mentors
- Our Hero

==== 2003 ====
- Degrassi: The Next Generation
- Fast Food High
- Guinevere Jones
- Moville Mysteries
- The Dinosaur Hunter

==== 2004 ====
- Degrassi: The Next Generation
- Edgemont
- Jacob Two-Two
- Radio Free Roscoe
- Strange Days at Blake Holsey High

==== 2005 ====
- Radio Free Roscoe
- 15/Love
- Fries With That?
- Fungus the Bogeyman
- Instant Star

==== 2006 ====
- The Morgan Waters Show
- 15/Love
- Dark Oracle
- renegadepress.com
- The Reading Rangers

==== 2007 ====
- Wapos Bay: The Series
- Alice, I Think
- Degrassi: The Next Generation
- Jacob Two-Two
- Spirit Bear: The Simon Jackson Story

==== 2008 ====
- Degrassi: The Next Generation
- Instant Star
- Tumbletown Tales

==== 2009 ====
- Life with Derek
- Instant Star
- The Latest Buzz

=== 2010s ===
==== 2010 ====
- Overruled!
- Degrassi: The Next Generation
- Pillars of Freedom
- That's So Weird!
- Total Drama Action

==== 2011 ====
- Degrassi
- Anash and the Legacy of the Sun-Rock
- How to be Indie
- That's So Weird!
- Vacation with Derek

==== 2012 ====
- Degrassi
- The Haunting Hour
- Mudpit
- That's So Weird!
- What's Up Warthogs!

==== 2013 ====
- Degrassi
- ALIVE
- Life with Boys
- Mr. Young
- The Next Step

==== 2014 ====
- Degrassi
- The Next Step
- Total Drama All-Stars

==== 2015 ====
- Degrassi
- Annedroids
- Full Out
- Max & Shred

==== 2016 ====
- Odd Squad
- Backstage
- Degrassi: Next Class
- Make It Pop
- Wild Kratts

==== 2017 ====
- Odd Squad
- Degrassi: Next Class
- L.M. Montgomery's Anne of Green Gables: Fire and Dew
- The Next Step

==== 2018 ====
- Odd Squad
- Backstage
- The Next Step
- ReBoot: The Guardian Code

==== 2019 ====
- Holly Hobbie
- Backstage
- Big Top Academy
- Creeped Out

==== 2020 ====
- Odd Squad Mobile Unit
- Detention Adventure
- Endlings
- Holly Hobbie
- Utopia Falls

==== 2021 ====
- The Hardy Boys
- Endlings
- Lockdown
- Odd Squad Mobile Unit

==== 2022 ====
- Detention Adventure
- Holly Hobbie
- Malory Towers
- The Next Step
- Odd Squad Mobile Unit

==== 2023 ====
- The Hardy Boys
- Home Sweet Rome
- Macy Murdoch
- Malory Towers

==== 2024 ====
- Beyond Black Beauty
- Gangnam Project
- Geek Girl
- Odd Squad UK
- Popularity Papers
