= Beyond Black Beauty =

2024 Canadian family drama television series

- Genre: Teen drama
- Created by: Carmen Pilar Golden
- Written by: Carmen Pilar Golden; Kara Harun; Cheryl Meyer; Jay Vaidya; Murry Peeters; Amanda Fahey; Joan Digba
- Directed by: Alicia K. Harris; Alison Reid; Mars Horodyski
- Starring: Kaya Coleman; Gilles Marini; Sagine Sémajuste; Lisa Berry; Akiel Julien; Ashton James; Gina James; Yanna McIntosh; Mark Taylor
- Composers: Yves Gourmeur; Leny Magoufakis
- Countries of origin: Canada; Belgium
- Original language: English
- No. of seasons: 1
- No. of episodes: 12

Production
- Executive producers: Matthew J.R. Bishop; Leif Bristow; Agnes Bristow; Carla de Jong; Amanda Fahey; J.J. Johnson; Alicia K. Harris; Blair Powers; Christin Simms; Jay Vaidya; Carmen Pilar Golden; Patrice Theroux
- Producer: Borga Dorter
- Running time: 25 minutes
- Production companies: Sinking Ship Entertainment; Leif Films; Saga Film

Original release
- Network: Family Channel
- Release: March 15 – May 28, 2024

Beyond Black Beauty is a Canadian-Belgian youth drama series, which premiered in 2024. Inspired by the influential novel Black Beauty, the series stars Kaya Coleman as Jolie Dumont, a young woman with a passion for horses and a dream of competing in equestrian events at the Olympic Games.

== Premise ==
After growing up in Liège as the daughter of wealthy Belgian industrialist Cédric (Gilles Marini) and his American wife Janelle (Sagine Sémajuste), who trained her in the English riding style, her life is upended when her parents split up and her mother takes her back to her own more modest family roots in Baltimore.

Initially unhappy, she finds new meaning and opportunity in the situation when she connects with Beauty, the seemingly untrainable wild horse at the family ranch run by Janelle's sister Yvonne (Lisa Berry), and begins to learn more about rodeo culture and Western riding.

== Production ==
The series was produced by Sinking Ship Entertainment, Leif Films and Saga Film, and was filmed principally in and around North Bay, Ontario.

The series has been noted for highlighting the Black cowboy culture that has gained prominence in the 2020s.

== Distribution ==
It premiered March 15, 2024, on Family Channel, and launched in October 2024 on Amazon Prime Video in the United States.

== Cast ==
- Kaya Coleman as Jolie Dumont
- Gilles Marini as Cédric Dumont, Jolie's father
- Sagine Sémajuste as Janelle Dumont, Jolie's mother
- Lisa Berry as Yvonne Parrish, Jolie's aunt
- Ashton James as Lemond Parrish, Jolie's cousin
- Gina James as Ronnie Parrish, Jolie's cousin
- Akiel Julien as Alvin Shipp
- Yanna McIntosh as Doris, Jolie's grandmother
- Justice James as Lil Man
- Mark Taylor as Rashaad, Yvonne's former boyfriend with whom she tries to rekindle a relationship
- Serge Dupire as Eckert Dumont, Jolie's paternal grandfather

== Episodes ==
No.	Title	Directed by	Written by	Original release date
1	"Losing My Religion"	Alicia K. Harris	Carmen Pilar Golden	March 15, 2024
2	"This Used to Be My Playground"	Alicia K. Harris	Jay Vaidya	March 15, 2024
3	"Good Mother"	Alicia K. Harris	Murry Peeters	March 26, 2024
4	"Everybody Hurts"	Alison Reid	Kara Harun, Cheryl Meyer	April 2, 2024
5	"Confessions"	Alison Reid	Amanda Fahey	April 9, 2024
6	"Feels Like Home"	Alison Reid	Carmen Pilar Golden	April 16, 2024
7	"My Life"	Mars Horodyski	Carmen Pilar Golden	April 23, 2024
8	"You Gotta Be"	Mars Horodyski	Joan Digba	April 30, 2024
9	"You Learn"	Mars Horodyski	Kara Harun, Cheryl Meyer	May 7, 2024
10	"If You Love Me"	Alison Reid	Amanda Fahey	May 14, 2024
11	"A Change Would Do You Good"	Alicia K. Harris	Jay Vaidya	May 21, 2024
12	"The Promise of a New Day"	Alicia K. Harris	Carmen Pilar Golden	May 28, 2024

== Awards ==
Award	Date of ceremony	Category	Recipient	Result	Ref.
Canadian Screen Awards	2025	Best Children's or Youth Fiction Program or Series	Matthew J.R. Bishop, Leif Bristow, Agnes Bristow, Carla de Jong, Borga Dorter, Amanda Fahey, J.J. Johnson, Alicia K. Harris, Blair Powers, Christin Simms, Jay Vaidya, Carmen Pilar Golden, Patrice Theroux, Hubert Toint, Alexis Grieve	Won	
Canadian Screen Awards	2025	Best Supporting Performance in a Children's or Youth Program or Series	Lisa Berry	Nominated	
Canadian Screen Awards	2025	Best Supporting Performance in a Children's or Youth Program or Series	Akiel Julien	Nominated	
Canadian Screen Awards	2025	Best Direction in a Children's or Youth Program or Series	Alicia K. Harris "The Promise of a New Day"	Won	
Canadian Screen Awards	2025	Best Writing in a Children's or Youth Program or Series	Kara Harun, Cheryl Meyer "Everybody Hurts"	Won	
Canadian Screen Awards	2025	Best Photography in a Drama Program or Series	Amy Belling "If You Love Me"	Won	
Canadian Screen Awards	2025	Best Makeup	Roxanne DeNobrega "This Used to Be My Playground"	Nominated	
GLAAD Media Awards	2025	Outstanding Kids and Family Programming	"If You Love Me"	Nominated	
