= Michela Luci =

Canadian actress (born 2006)

- Born: May 19, 2006 (age 20); Hamilton, Ontario, Canada
- Occupation: Actress
- Years active: 2014–present

Michela Luci (born May 19, 2006) is a Canadian actress from Hamilton, Ontario, most noted as the leading role of Dino Dana. She won a Daytime Emmy Award for Outstanding Performer in a Children's, Family Viewing or Special Class Program at the 45th Daytime Emmy Awards, and is a two-time Canadian Screen Award nominee for Best Performance in a Children's or Youth Program or Series at the 6th Canadian Screen Awards in 2018 and the 7th Canadian Screen Awards in 2019. She also portrayed Tabby in the science fiction series Endlings, which premiered on January 5, 2020 on CBC Television in Canada and Hulu in the U.S.

== Early life ==
Michela Luci was born on May 19, 2006, in Hamilton, Ontario to mother Lucy Fricano. She attended Immaculate Conception School.

== Career ==
Luci first gained recognition as a judge on YTV’s Cook’d and went on to book the recurring role of Agent Orchid on the Emmy award-winning TVOKids and PBS Kids series Odd Squad. The series' creator Tim McKeon said he was "so impressed with [Luci's] talent and professionalism" saying he "always found her to be hard working, courteous and well-prepared". Luci was nominated for Young Artist Awards twice for her work in Odd Squad, in 2015 and 2017. She and the cast of Odd Squad won a Joey Award in 2015. In 2016, Luci appeared in Odd Squad: The Movie as Agent Orchid. This marked her first theatrical appearance. In the same year, she also formed the all-girl group GEN:ZED (formerly GFORCE) with a group of friends from the Greater Toronto Area.

Luci and the other members of GFORCE auditioned for season 14 of America's Got Talent, singing their original song "Break the Banks". The group received four yeses from all four judges. Luci also voiced the titular protagonist in the Netflix original True and the Rainbow Kingdom. She then took on a voice acting role of Princess Flug in TVOKids and the Nick Jr. Channel's Abby Hatcher. In 2018, she was nominated for two Young Entertainer Awards, a Daytime Emmy Award and a Canadian Screen Award for her work in True and the Rainbow Kingdom and Dino Dana. In 2019, season three of Dino Dana began airing. Luci was nominated for three awards for her work in Dino Dana including winning a Daytime Emmy Award and a Youth Media Alliance Award of Excellence. Luci was cast as Tabby on Hulu original Endlings. She stars in Dino Dana: The Movie, released in September 2020 on Amazon Prime Video after originally slated to be released in early 2020 but was delayed due to the COVID-19 pandemic.

== Filmography ==
=== Films ===
Year	Title	Role	Notes
2016	Odd Squad: The Movie	Agent Orchid	
2020	Dino Dana: The Movie	Dana Jain	
2025	Sunfish (& Other Stories on Green Lake)	Holly	

=== Television ===
Year	Title	Role	Notes
2014	Cook'd	Herself/Judge	
2014–2021	Odd Squad	Agent Orchid	Recurring
2017–20	Dino Dana	Dana Jain	Lead role
2017–19	True and the Rainbow Kingdom	True (voice)	Lead role
2018–22	Abby Hatcher	Princess Flug (voice)	Main role
2019–22	Charlie's Colorforms City	Yetilda (voice)	Main role
2019	America's Got Talent	Herself	Contestant (season 14)
2020–21	Endlings	Tabby	Main role
2020	True: Terrific Tales	True (voice)	Lead role
2020–22	Mighty Express	Farmer Faye (voice)	Main role
2020	Pikwik Pack	Maddy Rhino (voice)	Episode: "Hazel's Mishap/Axel's Lucky Day"
2020–24	PJ Masks	Octobella (voice)	Recurring
2021–23	Go, Dog, Go!	Tag Barker (voice)	Main role
2023–present	Rubble & Crew	Sierra Sparkle (voice)	Recurring
2023–24	Blue's Clues & You!	Pail (voice)	Main role (seasons 4–5)
2024	Dino Dex	Dana Jain	3 episodes
2025	Paw Patrol	Sierra Sparkle (voice)	Episode: "Pups Save a Pop Star"
2026	Cyber Chase	Miranda the Penguin	Episode: "Every Flipper Counts"

== Awards and nominations ==
Year	Award	Category	Work	Result	Ref.
2015	Young Artist Awards	Best Performance in a TV Series – Guest Starring Young Actress 10 and Under	Odd Squad	Nominated	
2017	Young Artist Awards	Best Performance in a TV Series – Recurring Young Actress	Odd Squad	Nominated	
2018	Canadian Screen Awards	Best Performance in a Children's or Youth Program or Series	Dino Dana	Nominated	
2018	Daytime Emmy Awards	Outstanding Performer in a Children's, Preschool Children's or Educational and Informational Program	Dino Dana	Nominated	
2018	Young Entertainer Awards	Best Leading Young Actress - Television Series	Dino Dana	Nominated	
2018	Young Entertainer Awards	Best Young Actress 12 & Under - Voice Over Role	True and the Rainbow Kingdom	Nominated	
2019	Canadian Screen Awards	Best Performance in a Children's or Youth Program or Series	Dino Dana	Nominated	
2019	Daytime Emmy Awards	Outstanding Performer in a Children's, Family Viewing or Special Class Program	Dino Dana	Won	
2019	Youth Media Alliance	Outstanding Youth Performer	Dino Dana	Won	
