= Gangnam Project =

2024 Canadian television series

- Genre: Comedy-drama; Musical
- Created by: Sarah Haasz
- Developed by: Romeo Candido; Nathalie Younglai
- Showrunners: Romeo Candido; Sarah Haasz
- Directed by: Justin Wu; Romeo Candido; Gloria Kim
- Starring: Julia Kim Caldwell; Taran Kim; Dale Yim; Katie Griffin; Brianna Kim
- Opening theme: "It's My Time"
- Composer: August Rigo
- Country of origin: Canada
- Original language: English
- No. of seasons: 2
- No. of episodes: 20

Production
- Executive producers: Andrew Rosen; Anthony Leo; Romeo Candido; Sarah Haasz
- Production locations: Hamilton, Ontario, Canada
- Running time: 25 minutes
- Production companies: Aircraft Pictures; Pillango Productions

Original release
- Network: CBC Gem
- Release: March 8, 2024 – present

Gangnam Project is a Canadian youth comedy-drama series, which premiered in 2024 on CBC Gem.

== Synopsis ==
The series stars Julia Kim Caldwell as Hannah Shin, a Korean Canadian teenager with dreams of becoming a K-pop star, who gets a job in Seoul as an English tutor at a K-pop training school.

== Cast ==
The cast also includes Brianna Kim as Chan-Mi, a student at the training academy who becomes a rival to Hannah, as well as Zeboria, Sean Baek, M. J. Kang, Paul Seungbin Lee, Joshua Hyunho Lee, Angela Son, Taran Kim, Kylie Haasz, Kimmy Choi, Kayleigh Shikanai, Aadin Church, Sonam Kalsang, Soo-Ram Kim, Daniel Junghuan Park, Tommy Chang, Dahyeon Hwang, Judy Min Lee, Nataly Um and Soon-Year Lee in supporting roles.

== Production ==
The series was created by Sarah Haasz, based in part on her own childhood experience being treated as an outsider, rather than a Korean, when she participated in a Korean cultural exchange program. It was shot in Hamilton, Ontario, principally on the campus of Mohawk College, and produced by Pillango Productions and Aircraft Pictures. Additional LED volume and Virtual Production shots were handled by Toronto based Dark Slope Studios in partnership with Immersion Room.

== Music ==
Music for the show was written by Canadian musician August Rigo.

== Broadcast ==
The series premiered in March 2024 on CBC Gem in Canada, and CBBC in the United Kingdom. A second season went into production in the fall of 2024, and was released in 2025.

== Awards ==
Award	Date of ceremony	Category	Recipient(s)	Result	Ref.
Canadian Screen Awards	2025	Best Children's or Youth Fiction Program or Series	Sarah Haasz, Romeo Candido, Anthony Leo, Andrew Rosen, Amy Cole, Aubrey Clarke	Nominated	
Canadian Screen Awards	2025	Best Direction in a Children's or Youth Program or Series	Romeo Candido, "Pilot"	Nominated	
Canadian Screen Awards	2025	Canada Media Fund Kids Choice Award	Sarah Haasz, Romeo Candido, Anthony Leo, Andrew Rosen, Amy Cole, Aubrey Clarke	Nominated	
