= Canadian Screen Award for Best Direction in a Children's or Youth Program or Series =

Canadian children's television language award

The Canadian Screen Award Award for Best Direction in a Children's or Youth Program or Series is a Canadian Screen Award that honours direction in English language children's television produced in Canada.

== Winners and nominees ==
Winners in bold.

=== 2000s ===
Year	Actor	Series	Ref
2003; 18th Gemini Awards
2003; 18th Gemini Awards	**Bruce McDonald**	**Degrassi: The Next Generation: "Weird Science"**	
2003; 18th Gemini Awards	Anthony Atkins	Edgemont: "Friday Night's All Right"	
2003; 18th Gemini Awards	Jessica Bradford	When I Was Seven	
2003; 18th Gemini Awards	Grant Harvey	Mentors: "Remembrance"	
2003; 18th Gemini Awards	Stefan Scaini	Strange Days at Blake Holsey High: "Culture"	
2004; 19th Gemini Awards
2004; 19th Gemini Awards	**Phil Earnshaw**	**Degrassi: The Next Generation: "Pride"**	
2004; 19th Gemini Awards	Michael Fallows	Miss Spider's Sunny Patch Kids	
2004; 19th Gemini Awards	Don McBrearty	Mrs. Ashboro's Cat	
2004; 19th Gemini Awards	Chuck Rubin	Poko: "Poko on the Moon"	
2004; 19th Gemini Awards	Martin Wood	The Impossible Elephant	
2005; 20th Gemini Awards
2005; 20th Gemini Awards	**Graeme Campbell**	**Instant Star: "You Can't Always Get What You Want"**	
2005; 20th Gemini Awards	Jeffrey Agala, Ridd Sorenson, Mauro Casalese	Atomic Betty: "Atomic Roger/Toxic Talent"	
2005; 20th Gemini Awards	Robert de Lint	renegadepress.com: "Dying to Connect"	
2005; 20th Gemini Awards	Robert Higden, Richard Mortimer, Sid Goldberg	Surprise! It's Edible Incredible!: "Matthew and Jordan"	
2005; 20th Gemini Awards	J. J. Johnson	This Is Daniel Cook: "This is Daniel Cook Doing Magic..."	
2006; 21st Gemini Awards
2006; 21st Gemini Awards	**Paolo Barzman**	**15/Love: "Volley of the Dolls"**	
2006; 21st Gemini Awards	Stan Gadziola, Chuck Rubin, Brian Duchschere	Poko: "Poko & Bibi of the Arctic"	
2006; 21st Gemini Awards	Philip Marcus	Dragon: "Dragon Runs the Store"	
2006; 21st Gemini Awards	Ron Murphy	Dark Oracle: "TrailBLAZE"	
2006; 21st Gemini Awards	Jamie Whitney	If the World Were a Village	
2007; 22nd Gemini Awards
2007; 22nd Gemini Awards	**Joseph Sherman**	**Johnny Test: "Saturday Night's Alright for Johnny/Johnny's Mint Chip"**	
2007; 22nd Gemini Awards	Graeme Campbell	Instant Star: "I Fought the Law"	
2007; 22nd Gemini Awards	Robert Cohen	The Great Canadian Polar Bear Adventure	
2007; 22nd Gemini Awards	Rick Marshall	Peep and the Big Wide World: "Dry Duck"	
2007; 22nd Gemini Awards	Pat Williams	Instant Star: "Personality Crisis"	
2008; 23rd Gemini Awards
2008; 23rd Gemini Awards	**Robert Daniel Pytlyk**	**Drug Class: "Travis' Story"**	
2008; 23rd Gemini Awards	Jeff Beesley	renegadepress.com: "Cyber Sandbox"	
2008; 23rd Gemini Awards	Graeme Campbell	Instant Star: "Celebrity Skin"	
2008; 23rd Gemini Awards	Steve Diguer	Tumbletown Tales: "Secret Rodent Club"	
2008; 23rd Gemini Awards	Phil Earnshaw	Degrassi: The Next Generation: "Standing in the Dark, Part 1"	
2009; 24th Gemini Awards
2009; 24th Gemini Awards	**Eleanore Lindo**	**Degrassi: The Next Generation: "Fight the Power"**	
2009; 24th Gemini Awards	René Dowhaniuk	The Next Star: "The Duet"	
2009; 24th Gemini Awards	Alex Khan	Think Big: "Getting It Right"	
2009; 24th Gemini Awards	Michael Mabbott	Life with Derek: "March Break"	
2009; 24th Gemini Awards	Pat Williams	Instant Star: "Us and Them"	

=== 2010s ===
Year	Actor	Series	Ref
2010; 25th Gemini Awards
2010; 25th Gemini Awards	**Stefan Brogren**	**Degrassi: "Beat It, Part 2"**	
2010; 25th Gemini Awards	Phil Earnshaw	Degrassi: "Just Can't Get Enough, Part 2"	
2010; 25th Gemini Awards	Liz Haines	The Ocean Room: "Shorter Circuits"	
2010; 25th Gemini Awards	John May	How to Be Indie: "How to Trick Your Parents into Treating You Like a Grown Up"	
2010; 25th Gemini Awards	Craig Pryce	Family Biz: "Shake the Box"	
2011; 26th Gemini Awards
2011; 26th Gemini Awards	**Pat Williams**	**Degrassi: "All Falls Down, Part 2"**	
2011; 26th Gemini Awards	Phil Earnshaw	Degrassi: "My Body is a Cage, Part 2"	
2011; 26th Gemini Awards	William Gordon	Pirates: Adventures in Art: "Yo Ho Shadow"	
2011; 26th Gemini Awards	J. J. Johnson	Dino Dan: "Where the Dinosaurs Are"	
2011; 26th Gemini Awards	Mitchell Ness	Wingin' It: "Hold the Dressing"	
2012; 1st Canadian Screen Awards
2012; 1st Canadian Screen Awards	**Phil Earnshaw**	**Degrassi: "Scream, Part 2"**	
2012; 1st Canadian Screen Awards	Derby Crewe	Wingin' It: "Friday Afternoon Fever"	
2012; 1st Canadian Screen Awards	Neill Fearnley	The Haunting Hour: "Lights Out"	
2012; 1st Canadian Screen Awards	Brian Roberts	My Babysitter's A Vampire: "Three Geeks and a Demon"	
2012; 1st Canadian Screen Awards	Nadine Schwartz	run run revolution	
2013; 2nd Canadian Screen Awards
2013; 2nd Canadian Screen Awards	**Stefan Brogren**	**Degrassi: "Time of My Life"**	
2013; 2nd Canadian Screen Awards	Derby Crewe	Wingin' It: "Live and Let Fly"	
2013; 2nd Canadian Screen Awards	Samir Rehem	The Next Step: "Sabotage"	
2013; 2nd Canadian Screen Awards	Jesse Shamata, Rae Upton	The Grizzly Cup: "Part 1"	
2013; 2nd Canadian Screen Awards	Randall "RT!" Thorne	ALIVE	
2014; 3rd Canadian Screen Awards
2014; 3rd Canadian Screen Awards	**Phil Earnshaw**	**Degrassi: "Hypnotize"**	
2014; 3rd Canadian Screen Awards	Neill Fearnley	R.L. Stine's The Haunting Hour: "Brush With Madness"	
2014; 3rd Canadian Screen Awards	Allan Harmon	If I Had Wings	
2014; 3rd Canadian Screen Awards	J. J. Johnson	This Is Scarlett and Isaiah: "This Is Isaiah Helping with the First Day of School"	
2014; 3rd Canadian Screen Awards	John Payne and Lynn Reist	Franklin and Friends: "Franklin and the Four Seasons"	
2015; 4th Canadian Screen Awards
2015; 4th Canadian Screen Awards	**Phil Earnshaw**	**Degrassi: "Finally, Part 2"**	
2015; 4th Canadian Screen Awards	Stefan Brogren	Open Heart: "Last Things First"	
2015; 4th Canadian Screen Awards	J. J. Johnson	Annedroids: "New Pals"	
2015; 4th Canadian Screen Awards	Jesse Shamata	Gaming Show (In My Parents' Garage): "All Night Long"	
2015; 4th Canadian Screen Awards	Craig Wallace	Odd Squad: "The One That Got Away"	
2016; 5th Canadian Screen Awards
2016; 5th Canadian Screen Awards	**Eleanor Lindo**	**Degrassi: Next Class: "#ThisCouldBeUsButYouPlayin"**	
2016; 5th Canadian Screen Awards	J. J. Johnson	Odd Squad: "The First Day"	
2016; 5th Canadian Screen Awards	Zsolt Luka	The Mystery Files: "The Mystery Behind the Mask"	
2016; 5th Canadian Screen Awards	Ryan Marley	Science Max: Experiments at Large: "How You Build It"	
2016; 5th Canadian Screen Awards	Stefan Scaini	Odd Squad: "Failure to Lunch"	
2017; 6th Canadian Screen Awards
2017; 6th Canadian Screen Awards	**John Kent Harrison**	**L.M. Montgomery's Anne of Green Gables: Fire & Dew**	
2017; 6th Canadian Screen Awards	Derby Crewe	The Next Step: "A New Regime"	
2017; 6th Canadian Screen Awards	J. J. Johnson	Dino Dana: "Mega Tooth"	
2017; 6th Canadian Screen Awards	J. J. Johnson	Odd Squad: "The Cherry On-Top-Inator/Sir"	
2017; 6th Canadian Screen Awards	Graeme Lynch	Cheer Squad: "Three-peat?"	
2018; 7th Canadian Screen Awards
2018; 7th Canadian Screen Awards	**J. J. Johnson**	**Odd Squad: "World Turned Odd, Pt. 1"**	
2018; 7th Canadian Screen Awards	Derby Crewe	The Next Step: "Coup d'état"	
2018; 7th Canadian Screen Awards	J. J. Johnson	Dino Dana: "A Dino Never Forgets / Claw and Order"	
2018; 7th Canadian Screen Awards	Ryan Marley	Science Max: "Gravity Boat"	
2018; 7th Canadian Screen Awards	Mitchell T. Ness	The Next Step: "No Shell"	
2019; 8th Canadian Screen Awards
2019; 8th Canadian Screen Awards	**Megan Follows**	**Holly Hobbie: "The Freckled Fugitive"**	
2019; 8th Canadian Screen Awards	Stefan Brogren	Holly Hobbie: "The Birthday Basher"	
2019; 8th Canadian Screen Awards	J. J. Johnson	Dino Dana: "Dino Zone"	
2019; 8th Canadian Screen Awards	Gloria Ui Young Kim, Sharon Lewis	It's My Party!: "Winter Solstice"	
2019; 8th Canadian Screen Awards	Bruce McDonald	Creeped Out: "The Unfortunate Five"	

=== 2020s ===
Year	Actor	Series	Ref
2020; 9th Canadian Screen Awards
2020; 9th Canadian Screen Awards	**Warren P. Sonoda**	**Odd Squad Mobile Unit: "Music of Sound"**	
2020; 9th Canadian Screen Awards	Stefan Brogren	Holly Hobbie: "The Salty Songstress"	
2020; 9th Canadian Screen Awards	Bruce McDonald	Malory Towers: "The Spider"	
2020; 9th Canadian Screen Awards	Jasmin Mozaffari	Holly Hobbie: "The Puzzled Peacemaker"	
2020; 9th Canadian Screen Awards	R. T. Thorne	Utopia Falls: "I Can Kick It"	
2021; 10th Canadian Screen Awards
2021; 10th Canadian Screen Awards	**Melanie Orr**	**The Hardy Boys: "What Happened in Bridgeport"**	
2021; 10th Canadian Screen Awards	J.J. Johnson, Stefan Scaini	Odd Squad Mobile Unit: "H2 Oh No/In Your Dreams"	
2021; 10th Canadian Screen Awards	Graeme Lynch	All-Round Champion: "Boxing"	
2021; 10th Canadian Screen Awards	Melanie Orr	Endlings: "One World One"	
2021; 10th Canadian Screen Awards	Nicole Stamp	Lockdown: "The Confession"	
2022; 11th Canadian Screen Awards
2022; 11th Canadian Screen Awards	**Melanie Orr**	**The Hardy Boys: "The Doctor's Orders"**	
2022; 11th Canadian Screen Awards	Romeo Candido	The Next Step: "One Song Glory"	
2022; 11th Canadian Screen Awards	Graeme Lynch	All-Round Champion: "Hurdles"	
2022; 11th Canadian Screen Awards	Bruce McDonald	Malory Towers: "The New Headmistress"	
2022; 11th Canadian Screen Awards	Warren P. Sonoda	Odd Squad Mobile Unit: "Odd Together Now"	
2023; 12th Canadian Screen Awards
2023; 12th Canadian Screen Awards	**Felipe Rodriguez**	**The Hardy Boys: "The Crash"**	
2023; 12th Canadian Screen Awards	Kara Harun	Aunty B's House: "Dumpling of My Heart"	
2023; 12th Canadian Screen Awards	Rennata López	Dream It to Be It: "I Dream of Soccer"	
2023; 12th Canadian Screen Awards	Graeme Lynch	All-Round Champion: "Adaptive Boxing"	
2023; 12th Canadian Screen Awards	Stefan Scaini	Home Sweet Rome: "Tanti Auguri A Lucy"	
2024; 13th Canadian Screen Awards
2024; 13th Canadian Screen Awards	**Alicia K. Harris**	**Beyond Black Beauty: "The Promise of a New Day"**	
2024; 13th Canadian Screen Awards	Romeo Candido	Gangnam Project: "Pilot"	
2024; 13th Canadian Screen Awards	J. J. Johnson	Dino Dex: "Chickenosaurus Rex"	
2024; 13th Canadian Screen Awards	Allison Johnston	Davey and Jonesie's Locker: "You Don't Belong Here"	
2024; 13th Canadian Screen Awards	Graeme Lynch	All-Round Champion: "Arcathlon"	
