= Holly Hobbie (TV series) =

Canadian-American television series

- Genre: Comedy-drama Teen Drama
- Created by: Sarah Glinski
- Theme music composer: Cristi Vaughan; Matthew Naylor
- Composer: Aimee Bessada
- Countries of origin: Canada; United States
- No. of seasons: 5
- No. of episodes: 50

Production
- Executive producers: Sarah Glinski; Matthew Wexler; Sean Gorman; Karen Vermeulen; Ryan Wiesbrock
- Producers: Anthony Leo; Andrew Rosen
- Cinematography: Mitchell Ness
- Production companies: Aircraft Pictures; Cloudco Entertainment; Wexworks Media

Original release
- Network: Family Channel (Canada); Hulu (U.S.); BYUtv (U.S.)
- Release: November 16, 2018 – September 20, 2022

Related
- Holly Hobbie & Friends

Holly Hobbie is a teen drama television series developed by Sarah Glinski. It is the second television adaptation of the Holly Hobbie franchise after Holly Hobbie & Friends. The series is produced by Aircraft Pictures, in association with Cloudco Entertainment and Wexworks Media, and marks the first time Cloudco has produced a live-action series based on one of its properties. The show was released in the United States on Hulu in November 2018, and in Canada on Family Channel in January 2019. The second season was released on Hulu in November 2019. In early 2021, the series was renewed for a third season, which premiered on Hulu on November 23, 2021. It was further renewed by BYUtv for a fourth season, which premiered in May 2022, and a fifth season, which premiered in August 2022.

== Cast and characters ==
- Ruby Jay as Holly Hobbie, an aspiring teenage singer-songwriter living with her family in the small town of Collinsville
- Evan Buliung as Robert, Holly's father
- Erin Karpluk as Katherine, Holly's mother
- Charles Vandervaart as Robbie, Holly's older brother
- Kate Moyer as Heather, Holly's younger sister
- Sara Botsford as Helen (seasons 1–3), Holly's grandmother
- Hunter Dillon as Tyler Flaherty, Collinsville's "rebel" boy
- Saara Chaudry as Amy, one of Holly's best friends
- Kamaia Fairburn as Piper (seasons 1–3), another one of Holly's best friends
- Athena Park as Savannah (seasons 4–5; recurring, seasons 1–2), a rival of Holly who later becomes friends with Amy and Holly
- Marcus Cornwall as Levi (seasons 4–5; recurring, seasons 1–3), a friend of Heather's
- Tomaso Sanelli as Oscar (seasons 4–5; recurring, seasons 2–3), Holly's friend and music partner
- Ava Ro as Claudia (seasons 4–5; recurring, seasons 2–3), a friend of Heather's

== Episodes ==
=== Series overview ===
Season	Episodes	Originally released
1	10	November 16, 2018
2	10	November 22, 2019
3	10	November 23, 2021
4	10	May 1, 2022
5	10	August 1, 2022

=== Season 1 (2018) ===
No. overall	No. in season	Title	Directed by	Written by	Original release date
1	1	"The Show Starter"	Stefan Brogren	Sarah Glinski	November 16, 2018
2	2	"The Churlish Cheerleader"	Stefan Brogren	Courtney Jane Walker	November 16, 2018
3	3	"The Savvy Sleuth"	Stefan Brogren	Cole Bastedo	November 16, 2018
4	4	"The Pickle Princess"	Mars Horodyski	Matt Huether	November 16, 2018
5	5	"The Chicken Cooper"	Mars Horodyski	Sarah Glinski	November 16, 2018
6	6	"The Rabble Rouser"	Megan Follows	Cole Bastedo	November 16, 2018
7	7	"The Birthday Basher"	Stefan Brogren	Amanda Joy and Sara Peters	November 16, 2018
8	8	"The Freckled Fugitive"	Megan Follows	Courtney Jane Walker	November 16, 2018
9	9	"The Mad Muralist"	Megan Follows	Sarah Glinski	November 16, 2018
10	10	"The Crushing Criminal"	Stefan Brogren	Sarah Glinski	November 16, 2018

=== Season 2 (2019) ===
No. overall	No. in season	Title	Directed by	Written by	Original release date
11	1	"A Whole New Holly"	Stefan Brogren	Courtney Jane Walker	November 22, 2019
12	2	"The Thwarted Thespian"	Stefan Brogren	Courtney Jane Walker	November 22, 2019
13	3	"The Salty Songstress"	Stefan Brogren	Sarah Glinski	November 22, 2019
14	4	"The Cranky Camper"	Mitchell Ness	Sarah Glinski	November 22, 2019
15	5	"The Puzzled Peacemaker"	Jasmin Mozaffari	Alejandro Alcoba	November 22, 2019
16	6	"The Night-Crawling Newbie"	Mitchell Ness	Alejandro Alcoba	November 22, 2019
17	7	"The Perplexed Pioneer"	Stefan Brogren	Cole Bastedo	November 22, 2019
18	8	"The Dauntless Daughter"	Sarah Glinski	Cole Bastedo	November 22, 2019
19	9	"The Hesitant Heroine"	Stefan Brogren	Courtney Jane Walker & Jessica Meya	November 22, 2019
20	10	"The Selfless Starlet"	Stefan Brogren	Sarah Glinski	November 22, 2019

=== Season 3 (2021) ===
No. overall	No. in season	Title	Directed by	Written by	Original release date
21	1	"The Jam Jam"	Stefan Brogren	Sarah Glinski	November 23, 2021
22	2	"The Shortsighted Scholar"	Stefan Brogren	Vivian Lin	November 23, 2021
23	3	"The Posing Performer"	Alison Reid	Alejandro Alcoba	November 23, 2021
24	4	"The Grandpa Grenade"	Alison Reid	Matt Huether	November 23, 2021
25	5	"The Bumbling Bossgirl"	Alison Reid	Alejandro Alcoba	November 23, 2021
26	6	"The Slimy Sensation"	Faran Moradi	Vivian Lin	November 23, 2021
27	7	"The Horrible Hero"	Faran Moradi	Alejandro Alcoba	November 23, 2021
28	8	"The Fairweather Friend"	Stefan Brogren	Sarah Glinski	November 23, 2021
29	9	"The Careening Counselor"	Sarah Glinski	Matt Huether	November 23, 2021
30	10	"The Difficult Decision"	Stefan Brogren	Sarah Glinski	November 23, 2021

=== Season 4 (2022) ===
No. overall	No. in season	Title	Directed by	Written by	Original release date
31	1	"The Struggling Songwriter"	Stefan Brogren	Courtney Jane Walker	May 1, 2022
32	2	"The Song Circle Surprise"	Stefan Brogren	Courtney Jane Walker	May 1, 2022
33	3	"The Bestie Bonfire"	Stefan Brogren	Matt Huether	May 1, 2022
34	4	"The Aspiring Ally"	Karen Chapman	Lakna Edilima	May 1, 2022
35	5	"The Reticent Rulemaker"	Sarah Glinski	Sarah Glinski	May 1, 2022
36	6	"The Anxious Achiever"	Avi Federgreen	Alejandro Alcoba	May 1, 2022
37	7	"The Collinsville Conspiracist"	Karen Chapman	Matt Huether	May 1, 2022
38	8	"The Defiant Dancer"	Sarah Glinski	Courtney Jane Walker	May 1, 2022
39	9	"The Cowering Confidant"	Stefan Brogren	Alejandro Alcoba	May 1, 2022
40	10	"The Friendship Fiasco"	Stefan Brogren	Sarah Glinski	May 1, 2022

=== Season 5 (2022) ===
No. overall	No. in season	Title	Directed by	Written by	Original release date
41	1	"The Accidental Activist"	Stefan Brogren	Courtney Jane Walker	August 1, 2022
42	2	"The Defensive Driver"	Sarah Glinski	Sarah Glinski	August 1, 2022
43	3	"The Engrossed Essayist"	Avi Federgreen	Lakna Edilima	August 1, 2022
44	4	"The Vexed Volunteer"	Stefan Brogren	Matt Huether	August 1, 2022
45	5	"The Big City Belter"	Faran Moradi	Matt Huether	August 1, 2022
46	6	"The Vegan Veteran"	Alison Reid	Fatuma Adar	August 1, 2022
47	7	"The Adamant Athlete"	Alison Reid	Cole Bastedo	August 1, 2022
48	8	"The Disappointed Dreamer"	Faran Moradi	Courtney Jane Walker	August 1, 2022
49	9	"The Panicky Promgoer"	Sarah Glinski	Matt Huether	August 1, 2022
50	10	"A New Beginning"	Stefan Brogren	Sarah Glinski	August 1, 2022

== Production and release ==
The show was released in the United States on Hulu on November 16, 2018, aired on Family Channel in Canada which co-commissioned the series for production. In July 2019, the series was renewed for a second season, which was released on Hulu in November 2019. In June 2020, BYUtv acquired television broadcasting rights in the United States to the series, replacing Universal Kids, who had been broadcasting the series since December 2019.

In early 2021, Holly Hobbie was renewed for a third season, which was released on Hulu on November 23, 2021. The fourth and fifth seasons shifted from Hulu to BYUtv beginning in 2022. During this shift in broadcasters, Disney Channel in the United States acquired the rights to air the first three seasons of the series, which began airing in December 2021 and concluded in March 2022. The network has not broadcast the fourth and fifth season as the show was quietly removed from their lineup.

Sometime in 2024, Hulu added the fourth and fifth seasons of the series to their platform, making the entire series return to Disney in the United States once more.

On June 25, 2019, it was confirmed that the BBC had purchased the British broadcasting rights to the series for it to air on the CBBC Channel. Later, on September 25, 2019, Cloudco pre-sold the series to France Télévisions in France, Minimax in Central and Eastern Europe, and the TVA Group in Quebec. On November 6, 2020, the show's Latin American sales partner Spiral International pre-sold the series to Disney Channel in Latin America and Brazil. In these countries, the show is available on Disney+.

== Soundtrack ==
On June 25, 2019, it was confirmed that Cloudco had signed a deal with Warner Music Group subsidiary ARTS Music to release music from the series and that the show's theme tune would be released on that day. A digital album featuring songs from the first season was released on August 30, 2019. A second digital album titled What Comes Next, containing songs from the second season, was released on November 22, 2019. The show's theme song "Be The Change" and all songs on the soundtrack Music From Holly Hobbie [Songs From Season 1] were written by Cristi Vaughan and Matthew Naylor

== Awards ==
The series received eight Canadian Screen Award nominations at the 8th Canadian Screen Awards in 2020, for Best Children's or Youth Fiction Program or Series, Best Performance in a Children's or Youth Program or Series (3: Chaudry, Dillon, Moyer), Best Direction in a Children's or Youth Program or Series (2: Stefan Brogren for "The Birthday Basher" and Megan Follows for "The Freckled Fugitive") and Best Writing in a Children's or Youth Program or Series (2: Sarah Glinski for "The Mad Muralist" and Cole Bastedo for "The Rabble Rouser".)
