= Akiel Julien =

Grenadian-Canadian actor

- Born: October 31, 1996 (age 30); Grenada
- Education: Wexford Collegiate School for the Arts
- Occupation: Actor
- Years active: 2016–present

Akiel Julien (born October 31, 1996) is a Grenadian-Canadian actor. He is known for his role as LaTroy in the teen drama series The Next Step, for which he was a Canadian Screen Award nominee for Best Performance in a Children's or Youth Program or Series at the 6th Canadian Screen Awards in 2018.

== Biography ==
Julien was born in Grenada and grew up in Toronto, Canada. He attended Wexford Collegiate School for the Arts, where he majored in Musical Theatre and the Drama Intensive Program, graduating with honors.

Julien has appeared in Utopia Falls, The Parker Andersons, Frankie Drake Mysteries, Wayne, American Gods, What We Do in the Shadows, and The Boys. In 2022, he was named to host one of the advance gala presentations for the 10th Canadian Screen Awards.

== Filmography ==
=== Film ===
Year	Title	Role	Notes
2024	Code 8: Part II	Shane	Post-production

=== Television ===
Year	Title	Role	Notes
2016–2018	The Next Step	LaTroy	35 episodes
2018	In Contempt	Kelvin	Episode: "BLM, Part One"
2018	Frankie Drake Mysteries	Gerald	Episode: "Emancipation Day"
2019	Wayne	Gill	2 episodes
2019	American Gods	Cowboy #3	Episode: "Donar the Great"
2019	What We Do in the Shadows	Dancer	Episode: "The Trial"
2019	The Boys	Deeaygo	Episode: "Get Some"
2020	Utopia Falls	Bohdi 2	10 episodes
2021	The Parker Andersons	Nick Anderson	10 episodes
2022	Revenge of the Black Best Friend	Korrey	Episode: "Thug Race"
2024	Beyond Black Beauty	Alvin Shipp	

== Awards and nominations ==
Awards	Year	Category	Work	Result
Canadian Screen Awards	2017	Best Performance in a Children's or Youth Program or Series	The Next Step	Nominated
