= Lisa Berry =

Canadian actress (born 1979)

- Born: November 6, 1979 (age 46); Richmond Hill, Ontario, Canada
- Occupation: Actress
- Years active: 2006–present

Lisa Berry (born November 6, 1979) is a Canadian actress, seen regularly on television with appearances in The Colony, Northpole: Open for Christmas, Combat Hospital, Bad Blood, Shadowhunters: The Mortal Instruments, 19-2 and Supernatural. Other credits include Departure (2019–2022), Ghostwriter (2022), Slasher (2019–2023).

== Early life ==
Berry was born in Richmond Hill, Ontario. She attended the Randolph Academy for the Performing Arts, graduating in 2004, returning on occasion to encourage students in their learning. The Canadian actress started her career in the entertainment industry as a make-up artist before getting her big break as an actress.

== Career ==
In 2011, she appeared as Christine Mayweather in the television movie Desperately Seeking Santa.

In 2012, Berry played the role of clinic receptionist in the sci-fi thriller Antiviral, which won the "Best Canadian First Feature Film" at the 2012 Toronto International Film Festival (TIFF).

In 2013, Lisa Berry starred as Nara in the Netflix film The Colony alongside Laurence Fishburne and Bill Paxton. Some of the highlights of Berry's extensive career include playing Captain Pam Everwood, RN in twelve episodes of the 2011 television series Combat Hospital, and the 2015 films No Stranger Than Love , and Northpole: Open for Christmas.

In 2019, Berry appeared as Detective Roberta Hanson in eight episodes of Slasher. From 2015 to 2020, Berry had a recurring role as Billie the Reaper (and the Death) for fourteen episodes of Supernatural, alongside Jensen Ackles and Jared Padalecki.

Berry has also appeared in commercials for the Nintendo Wii, Walmart and Quaker Oats.

In 2022, she starred as Layla Barnes in season 3 of Ghostwriter.

== Awards and nominations ==
- Trailblazer Award, Reel World Film Festival
- Best Ensemble Dora Mavor Moore Award Nomination for your work in Young Peoples Theatre production of `To Kill A Mockingbird’.
- 2012 Berry was part of the winning cast of Antiviral which won the "Best Canadian First Feature Film" at the 2012 Toronto International Film Festival.
- 2014 Nominated for a Best Actress Award for the Black Canadian Awards in Toronto.
- 2015 Nominated for a Best Actress Award for the Black Canadian Awards in Toronto.
- 2017 RCPA Alumni of Distinction Award
- 2022 Canadian Screen Awards Nominated for Best Lead Performance, Web Program or Series for 21 Black Futures.

== Filmography ==
=== Film ===
Year	Title	Role
2008	Saw V	EMT
2009	Booky's Crush	Librarian
2011	Desperately Seeking Santa	Christine Mayweather
2012	Mr. Viral	Female Fighter 1
2012	Antiviral	Lucas Clinic Receptionist
2013	The Colony	Nara
2014	Bee & Julie-Julie (Short)	Bee's Mom
2015	Northpole: Open for Christmas	Taylor
2015	No Stranger Than Love	Fay
2017	Power Rangers	Candace Cranston
2024	Humane	Newscasters voice

=== TV Movie ===
Year	Title	Role
2006	Gospel of Deceit	Sarah
2011	Silent Witness	Stella Marz
2013	Be My Valentine	Wendy
2019	The Sisterhood (A Deadly Invitation)	Desiree Holt
2020	A Daughters Ordeal	Nina
2022	5.8 Fallen Angels Murder Club: Friends to Die For	Abby Caldwell
2022	6.0 Fallen Angels Murder Club: Heroes and Felons	Abby Caldwell
2024	BeBe Winans' We Three Kings	Lydia

=== Television series ===
Year	Title	Role	Notes
2006	ReGenesis	Nurse	1 episode - The End
2006	Degrassi: The Next Generation	Theatre Manager	1 episode - High Fidelity: Part 1
2007	Da Kink in My Hair	Nia	1 episode - Rules Are Made...
2010	MotherLoad	Dorothy	1 episode
2010	Heartland	Barb Wharton	1 episode - Second Chances
2010	Being Erica	Melanda	1 episode - The Tribe Has Spoken
2010	Lost Girl	Serena	1 episode - ArachnoFaebia
2011	Republic of Doyle	Karla Green	1 episode - Family Business
2011	Skins	Principal Turner	2 episodes
2011	Against the Wall	Janice Lawrence	2 episodes
2011	The Being Frank Show		Episode #1.23
2011	Combat Hospital	Capt. Pam Everwood, RN	12 episodes
2011	Rookie Blue	Attractive Woman	1 episode - A Little Faith
2012	Nikita	Harriet Jennings	3 episodes
2012	The Firm	Zoe Figgis	1 episode - Pilot
2011–2012	XIII: The Series	Grier / CIA Analyst	4 episodes
2012	Haven	Rica Hamilton	1 episode - Magic Hour
2012	Transporter: The Series	Transplant Co-ordinator	1 episode - Harvest
2013	The Listener	Lorraine Browning	1 episode - Cold Storage
2013	Cracked	Detective Roz Cabrera	1 episode - Night Terrors
2015	Continuum	Nolan	4 episodes
2015	Mr. D	Kathy Lee Giffer	1 episode - Coaching Prospects
2015–2016	19-2	Rita George	4 episodes
2017–2018	Shadowhunters: The Mortal Instruments	Cleophas Graymark	4 episodes
2018	Bad Blood	Nellie Bullock	8 episodes
2019	Wayne	Gail	1 episode - Chapter One: Get Some Then
2019	Save Me	Summer	1 episode - Animl
2019	Designated Survivor	Rachelle	1 episode
2019	Slasher	Detective Roberta Hanson	S3 (E1 - E8)
2019	Hudson & Rex	Dr. Helen Dubois	1 episode - "Game of Bones"
2015–2020	Supernatural	Billie the Reaper/Death	14 episodes
2020	Corn & Peg	Miss Tenderhoof (voice)	1 episode
2020–2021	Workin' Moms	Natashia	5 episodes
2020	Star Trek: Discovery	Kanak	Season 3 episode 12 - "There is a Tide..."
2021	21 Black Futures	Crystal Hinds	S2 Episode 3 - "Notice"
2021	Private Eyes	Mayor Nichelle	S5 Episode 6 - "Angie Get Your Gun"
2019 & 2022	Departure	Alexis Johnson / Tabatha	S1 E1 - "Vanished" + S3 E6 "What Lies Beneath"
2022	Ghostwriter	Layla Barnes	Season 3 - 12 episodes
2023	Slasher	Dr. Melanda Israel	S5 (E1 - E8)
2023	Nesting	Jenny	Season 4 episode 4
2023	Chucky	Tiffany's Lawyer	Season 3 episode 3 - "Jennifer's Body"
2024	Beyond Black Beauty	Yvonne Parrish	12 episodes
