= Scoop and Doozie =

Canadian children's television series

Scoop and Doozie was a late 1990s Children's television series about the everyday lives of Doozie, an orange toy bulldozer, Scoop, a yellow toy excavator, and Axel, a blue and red dumptruck, aimed at preschoolers and kindergarteners. It used skillful puppetry and live videos to teach about construction and machinery to children. It aired for a short time on CBC Television's children block called CBC Playground (now CBC Kids) from 1999 to 2002. The series was filmed at the CBC Regional Broadcast Centre at CBUT in Vancouver, British Columbia.

== Characters ==
- Scoop----a yellow (sometimes green) closed-bucket excavator. She was smart and witty, but she was also a bit vain and prone to argue with Doozie. Scoop normally hung out with Axel.
- Doozie----an orange bulldozer. He was a lover of mischief, dirt, and excitement. Doozie was very excitable, and was smart and witty like all of the featured toys. However, Doozie could be quite obnoxious, and (as part of his rivalry with Scoop and Spritz) he often enjoyed causing trouble.
- Axel----a red and blue dump truck. Axel was the one member of the cast that was sensible and orderly. He loved to rest and relax, but most of his time was spent settling the arguments between Scoop, Doozie, and Spritz. Axel rarely got into trouble.
- Spritz----a silver and black troublemaking, argument starting, provoking garden hose. Spritz is considered somewhat of a villainous character, as she was pessimistic and enjoyed causing arguments.

Scoop and Doozie was produced by Queen Bee Productions. Romney Grant was executive producer. Vicki Grant was creative producer and story editor. Edward Peghin was the producer.

== Program Format ==
The show started out with the three machines, Axel, Scoop, and Doozie, doing something together when they encountered a problem. Upon this problem, they sometimes would go the basement window of the house of the yard where the machines lived, and watch the owner of the house doing something to solve a similar problem. Other times the machines would go over to the fence posts to watch Fence TV (a video of real machines screened through a knothole). When the basement/Fence TV segment was done, the machines use what they had seen and heard to apply to the problem they had encountered.

== Cast ==
Romney Grant and Vicki Grant are sisters. Romney is a lawyer who produced the cooking show "The Urban Peasant". Vicki is a television writer and novelist.

Christine Lippa, who played Scoop, Spritz and Mrs. Glover, is an actor and stand-up comedian. This was her first job as a puppeteer.

Norman Foote, who played Axel and Long John, wrote the music for the series. He is a popular children's entertainer.

Jim Rankin, who played Doozie, Jacques and Cal, also starred in The Comedy Network adult series, "Puppets Who Kill". He is currently developing his own preschool puppet show, "Go to Bed, Jimmy". Jim won a Gemini for his work on Scoop and Doozie.

Vicki Grant, who wrote most of the episodes, now writes Young Adult novels. Her first book, "The Puppet Wrangler", was inspired by Scoop and Doozie. She has also written two comic legal thrillers for teens, "Quid pro Quo" and "Res Judicata", as well as four shorter novels - "Dead-End Job", "Pigboy", "I.D." and "Nine Doors".

Scoop and Doozie won a Gemini Award for Best Writing in a Children's or Youth Program at the 15th Gemini Awards in 2000 for the episode "What Rubbish!" (by Vicki Grant), and a Bronze at the Columbus International Film and Video Festival for the episode "Some Bunny Like Me" (by Vicki Grant). It was also nominated for a Gemini for Best Children's or Youth Program and Best Writing in a Children's or Youth Program for the episode "Au Revoir, Underpants!" (by Vicki Grant).
