= Gary Pearson (comedian) =

Canadian comedian & television writer-producer

Gary Pearson is a Canadian comedian, and television writer-producer. His writing credits include MAD TV, This Hour Has 22 Minutes, Corner Gas, and That's So Weird!. He is co-creator of the television series Sunnyside.

== Career ==
He grew up in the southwestern Ontario village of Comber. Taking an early interest in politics and art, he began to do editorial cartoons for the nearby weekly newspaper The Tilbury Times.

He attended Sheridan College's illustration course, then later the cartooning and graphic story course. He got work in the public Canadian Broadcasting Corporation animation department and became one of its mainstays. He animated segments for Mr. Dressup and a portion of a Buddy Cole segment on The Kids in the Hall.

In the late 1980s, he got involved with the improv comedy troupe Dangerous Poultry through the group Theatresports Toronto, then with The Chumps Without a Net, who had a weekly radio show on CBC Radio. He was part of The Second City for a time and was a widely recognized face from dozens of TV commercials and television shows in the 1990s. He appeared on such TV comedies as The Newsroom, The Kids in the Hall and SketchCom, all on CBC, and the drama E.N.G. on CTV.

He scripted multiple CBC Radio programs such as Muckraker, which he created. Eventually he joined the Los Angeles staff of MAD TV, where he contributed writing to 25 episodes of the hit Fox program. He returned to Canada to write for five seasons of This Hour Has 22 Minutes and the hit CTV sitcom Corner Gas. In 2009 he became the head writer and executive producer of That's So Weird!, a youth comedy for YTV. In 2009 and 2010 he also wrote for The Ron James Show, a comedy for CBC.

Pearson has won a Canadian Comedy Award and a Writers Guild of Canada award for writing on This Hour Has 22 Minutes, and has five additional award nominations including for Canada's Gemini Awards. In 2014 he won a Canadian Screen Award for his work on This Hour Has 22 Minutes.

Pearson has published three novels. Slapshot of Love (2013) is a romantic comedy set in the world of reality TV. Me and the Crack Mayor (2014) is a political satire which sends up the time Rob Ford was mayor of Toronto Canada. Marooned In Space (2016) is a comedic science fiction novel about an unlikely group of astronauts discovering distant worlds. All three books are available around the world through Amazon.

Along with Dan Redican, he is a co-creator of the sketch comedy series Sunnyside, which premiered in 2015. It was nominated for 5 Canadian Screen Awards (The Candy), winning 2. He also co-created the sketch comedy show Middle Raged with Geri Hall.
