= Detention Adventure =

Canadian children's web series

- Created by: Carmen Albano; Joe Kicak
- Country of origin: Canada
- Original language: English

Production
- Production companies: Loco Motion Pictures; Broken Compass Films; Blue Ant International

Original release
- Network: CBC Gem; CBC Kids
- Release: May 3, 2019 – March 11, 2022

Detention Adventure is a Canadian children's web series, which premiered on May 3, 2019 on CBC Gem. Created by Carmen Albano and Joe Kicak, and produced by Lauren Corber of LoCo Motion Pictures and Broken Compass Films, the series centres on a group of children who stage elaborate pranks every day at school in the hopes of getting detention, so that they can investigate an unconfirmed rumour that the detention room has a secret trapdoor leading to the laboratory of Alexander Graham Bell.

The series stars Jack Fulton, Alina Prijono, Tomaso Sanelli, Simone Miller and Lilly Bartlam, as well as Andrew Moodie, Benjamin Ayres, Stacey McGunnigle, Sarah McVie, Dan Beirne, Mika Collins, Mike Lobel, Julian Richings, Rodrigo Fernandez-Stoll and Jamie Spilchuk in supporting roles.

In 2020, the series was picked up for distribution in the United States on HBO Max. The series was removed from HBO Max in 2022.

The series received two Canadian Screen Award nominations at the 8th Canadian Screen Awards in 2020, for Best Fiction Web Program or Series and Best Writing in a Web Program or Series (Karen Moore). At the 9th Canadian Screen Awards in 2021, it was nominated for Best Children's or Youth Fiction Program or Series, Best Performance in a Children's or Youth Program or Series (3: Bartlam, Sanelli, Miller), Best Original Music, Fiction (Ari Posner, Amin Bhatia, Sarah Slean and Antonio Naranjo) and Best Writing in a Children's or Youth Program (Jessica Meya).

== Premise ==
Detention Adventure focuses on nerds Hulk, Joy, and Raign working together with the school bully, Brett, to hunt for Alexander Graham Bell's hidden laboratory. The kids conduct elaborate pranks on their teachers and classmates in order to have themselves thrown into detention, which is held in a room that holds the secret passageway to the lab. They must solve riddles and puzzles in order to make their way through the tunnels and into the lab.

== Cast ==
- Jack Fulton as Norman "Hulk" Bean
- Alina Prijono as Joycelina "Joy" Ursula Jayadi
- Simone Miller as Raign Westbrook
- Tomaso Sanelli as Brett Aaron Austin
- Lilly Bartlam as Kelly Darnell
- Danté Prince as Al-Kareem-Nas Singh also known as Dash
