= John Acorn =

Canadian naturalist

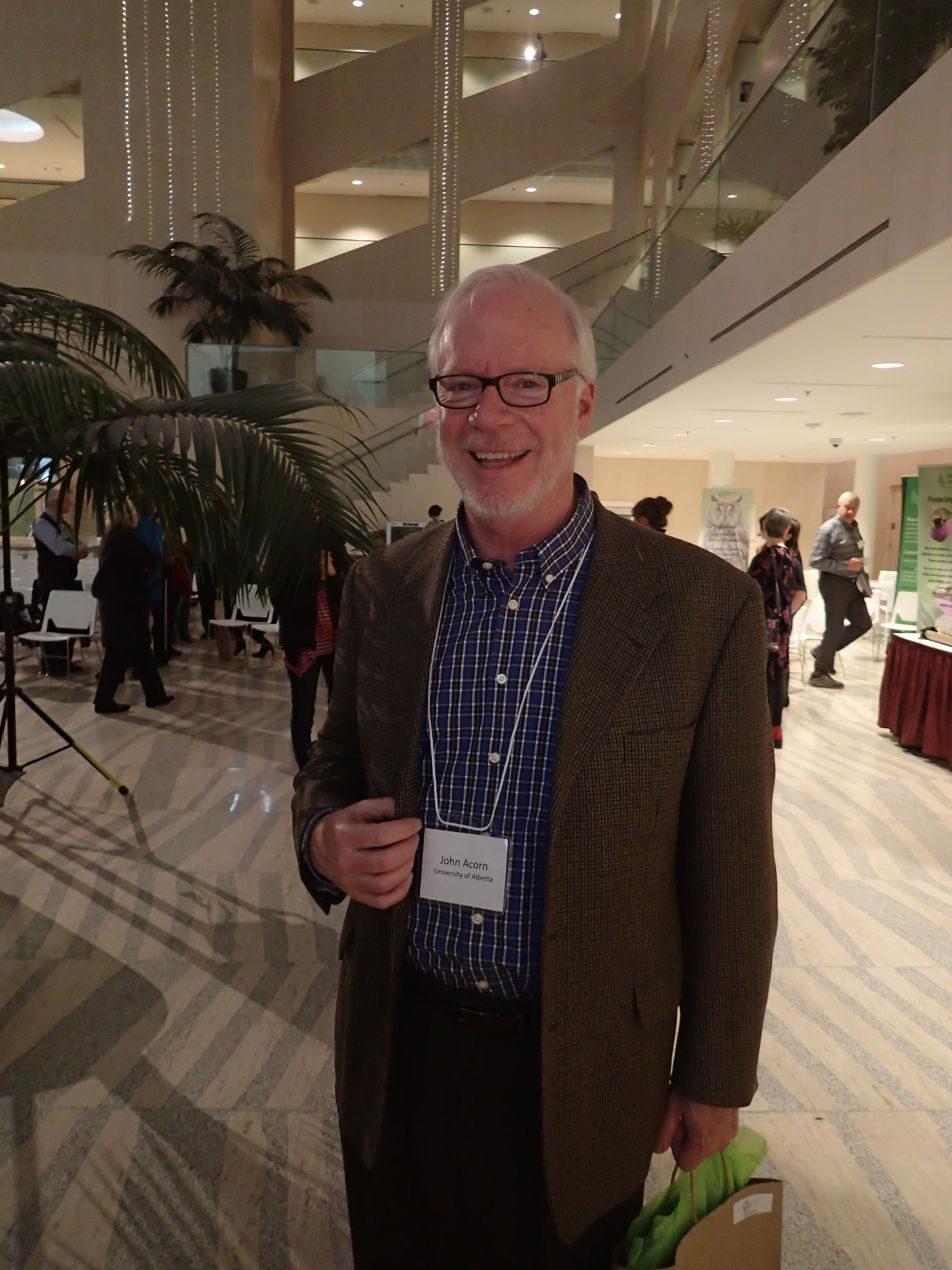
- Acorn at Edmonton City Hall, 2018
- Born: 1958 (age 67–68); Edmonton, Alberta
- Citizenship: Canada
- Known for: Acorn, the Nature Nut
- Spouse: Dr. Dena Stockburger

John Acorn is a Canadian naturalist. He is a lecturer at the University of Alberta, a research associate at the Royal Tyrrell Museum of Paleontology, and a research associate at the E.H. Strickland Entomology Museum. He is also a local Edmonton celebrity, combining folk music with educational lyrics about the natural world.

== Television series ==
John Acorn became publicly known for his television series Acorn, the Nature Nut. 88 episodes were produced, each focusing on a different aspect of the natural world, and which featured folk songs, whimsical descriptions like Flying Neon Toothpicks in the Grass, and characters like Skibibad Windfield. He was also the host of Twits and Pishers a series about birdwatching that ran for two seasons on the Discovery Channel.

Acorn also appears in recorded displays at the Royal Tyrrell Museum of Paleontology.

== Publications ==
- Birds of Alberta (Authored with Chris C. Fisher and Gary Ross)
- Birds of Coastal British Columbia (Authored with Nancy Baron and Ted Nordhagen)
- Birds of the Pacific Northwest Coast (Authored with Nancy Baron)
- Bugs of Alberta (Authored with Ian Sheldon)
- Bugs of British Columbia (Authored with Ian Sheldon)
- Bugs of Northern California (Authored with Ian Sheldon)
- Bugs of Ontario (Authored with Ian Sheldon)
- Bugs of Washington and Oregon (Authored with Ian Sheldon)
- Butterflies of Alberta
- Butterflies of British Columbia (Authored with Ian Sheldon)
- Compact Guide to Alberta Birds (Authored with Chris Fisher and Andy Bezener)
- Damselflies of Alberta: Flying Neon Toothpicks in the Grass
- Deep Alberta: Fossil Facts and Dinosaur Digs
- Ladybugs of Alberta: Finding the Spots and Connecting the Dots
- Tiger Beetles of Alberta: Killers on the Clay, Stalkers on the Sand

== Awards ==
- 2013 Medal of Honor, Entomological Foundation
- 2012 Royal Society of Canada McNeil Medal
- 2008 NSERC Michael Smith Award for Science Promotion
- 2005 Distinguished Alumni Award. University of Alberta
- 2000 Emerald Award of Interpretation Canada for Gallery Videos at the Royal Tyrell Museum
- 1998 ALBERTA SCIENCE AND TECHNOLOGY, ASTech excellence in science & technology journalism
- 1998 GEMINI AWARD nomination
- 1996 GEMINI AWARD nomination
- 1997 AMPIA AWARD, Alberta Motion Picture industry awards.
- 1997 Edmonton Nature Centre Foundation
- 1997 Calgary Zoo, Pachyderm Award
- 1995 AMPIA AWARD, Alberta Motion Picture Industries Awards
