= That's So Weird! =

Canadian sketch comedy television series

- Genre: Sketch comedy
- Created by: Jeff Copeland
- Written by: Gary Pearson; Duncan McKenzie; Jerry Schaefer; Carolyn Taylor; Albert Howell; Jan Caruana
- Starring: James Hartnett; Hannah Hogan; Alana Johnston; Kayla Lorette; Joey Lucius; Alex Spencer; AJ Vaage
- Country of origin: Canada
- No. of seasons: 3
- No. of episodes: 39

Production
- Executive producer: Gary Pearson
- Production locations: Halifax, Nova Scotia, Canada
- Production company: DHX Media Halifax (Halifax Film)

Original release
- Network: YTV
- Release: September 9, 2009 – March 8, 2012

That's So Weird! is a Canadian sketch comedy television show produced by Halifax Film Company (later DHX Media Halifax), created by Jeff Copeland, broadcast on YTV from September 9, 2009 to March 8, 2012. The show has been described as SCTV or Mad TV for teenagers and includes an array of comedic skits.

== Premise ==
The show is a documentation of a group of teenagers who work at a fictional television station called So Weird TV. They receive various unusual products from their owner, Jamco, and are given the duty of creating commercial advertisements for the strange items. Alongside the ads they are required to do, So Weird TV also has programming that parodies television programs such as Degrassi: The Next Generation and This is Daniel Cook.

== Characters ==
- Alana Johnston – The boss of the station, who, despite being a good friend, can be harsh.
- Kayla Lorette – A worker in the station. She is often criticized by Alana. In season 2 she develops a crush on James.
- James Hartnett – A worker in the station that develops a crush on Hannah, and is unaware that Kayla has a crush on him.
- Hannah Hogan – Has the highest popularity rating, and is often overconfident mostly for her own good. Her father also owns Jamco.
- Joey Lucius – A worker in the station who always manages to attract the attention of others.
- AJ Vaage – A worker in the station who often assists others.
- Alex Spencer – An African-Canadian worker in the station who has a relatively good relationship with everyone.

== Production ==
Most scenes are filmed in front of live studio audiences. Season 1 was filmed in the former St. Francis of Assisi Catholic School building in Toronto. Later seasons were filmed in Halifax, Nova Scotia in Studio 1 at CBC Halifax.

== Episodes ==
Season	Episodes	Originally aired	
Season	Episodes	Season premiere	Season finale
1	13	September 9, 2009	March 17, 2010
2	13	October 6, 2010	March 30, 2011
3	13	October 5, 2011	March 8, 2012

=== Season 1 (2009–10) ===
No. overall	No. in series	Title	Original release date
1	1	"Chocklick"	September 9, 2009
The team makes a commercial for Chocklick; a chocolate block that "lasts forever". YTV's Carlos makes a guest appearance.
2	2	"Shantz"	September 16, 2009
A new product that is a shirt and pants are made.
3	3	"Drool Aid"	September 23, 2009
Drool Aid, a powder making you drool juice, is brought forward.
4	4	"Pretty as a Picture"	September 30, 2009
A picture frame that goes on your neck and makes you look prettier.
5	5	"Greeting Card"	October 14, 2009
Greeting Cards for just when you need them is the ad for the team.
6	6	"Beef Whiz"	October 21, 2009
A commercial needs to be made for a liquid beef named Beef Whiz.
7	7	"Hamicil"	October 28, 2009
An acne cream that also can be dinner named Hamicil.
8	8	"Tacorea"	November 4, 2009
A taco restaurant ad needs to be made for the restaurant Tacorea.
9	9	"Leaky Roof"	November 11, 2009
A leaky roof won't stop following Kayla. Unfortunately, she is the only one noticing it.
10	10	"Scissors"	November 18, 2009
The team needs to make a Running With Scissors public service announcement.
11	11	"Feetza"	January 6, 2010
Feetza is a pizza and a foot lotion.
12	12	"Tried"	January 7, 2010
The detergent for people who don't care about clean clothes named Tried.
13	13	"Background Music"	March 17, 2010
Alana spends $500 on a subliminal background music machine.

=== Season 2 (2010–11) ===
No. overall	No. in series	Title	Original release date
14	1	"Space Thunder"	October 6, 2010
Kayla, in an attempt to gain James's love, gets the right to develop a TV show version of the comic book Space Thunder.
15	2	"Divide and Conquer"	October 13, 2010
Alex and Hannah both want personal assistants, but they have a problem sharing them.
16	3	"Gravity Trouble"	October 20, 2010
Weird gravity causes trouble for making TV shows.
17	4	"Emu Flu"	November 3, 2010
AJ catches the Emu flu, which makes him act like an emu. This causes him to be quarantined.
18	5	"April Fools"	November 10, 2010
Kayla pulls an April Fools joke, convincing everyone that Jamco is going to fire them if they don't make an April Fools prank. Everyone comes up with their own idea.
19	6	"The Game"	November 17, 2010
James, Joey, AJ, and Kayla play a game instead of working.
20	7	"Carmine"	January 5, 2011
A puppet named Carmine brings his show Carmine's Crib back. Carmine becomes an annoyance and an unpopular towards everyone.
21	8	"Power Struggle"	January 19, 2011
Hannah and Alex battle for who has the most ratings.
22	9	"Retro Show"	February 2, 2011
So Weird TV's 50th anniversary is coming up; Kayla initiates a plan to get James's attention, but it backfires when James ends up being with his love interest, Hannah.
23	10	"Ruthless Boss"	February 16, 2011
Alana trains for an annual ruthless boss competition trying to beat last year's champion and uses the MAL1000 computer to try to assist her in being ruthless. Unfortunately, MAL1000 becomes too ruthless for Alana.
24	11	"A Visit from Mom"	March 2, 2011
Alex's mom pays a visit to the station.
25	12	"Make AJ Do It"	March 16, 2011
When AJ gets a mustache, he feels more in control. Also, a giant blue hand stops Space Thunder.
26	13	"Bollywood"	March 30, 2011
Low ratings force the team to make a Bollywood music video. Also, James speaks out to Kayla.

=== Season 3 (2011–12) ===
No. overall	No. in series	Title	Original release date
27	1	"Iguana"	October 5, 2011
AJ falls in love with Alana, resulting in a love song. Alana interviews Jerry Trainor from iCarly.
28	2	"Heist"	October 12, 2011
The cast try to retrieve their property from Alana's locked cupboard. Also, Alana interviews David Henrie from Wizards of Waverly Place.
29	3	"Mortimer"	October 19, 2011
Alana dresses up as a new boss to make the team realize that having a fun manager has consequences.
30	4	"Heavy Metal AJ"	November 2, 2011
Joey discovers AJ's old band, which he decides to rejoin on their comeback tour.
31	5	"Ain't No Thing"	November 9, 2011
Alex's old sitcom is rebooted to bring back ratings, but the remake is cancelled. Also, Logan and Wilf answer questions from viewers.
32	6	"Hannah's Itch"	November 16, 2011
Hannah has a back itch which she has trouble relieving.
33	7	"Kaylaland"	November 23, 2011
Kayla visits Kaylaland, which is a parody of The Wizard of Oz, where people actually like her.
34	8	"Jimmy Jamco"	November 30, 2011
AJ wants to be known more not as the guy who gets hurt, so he plays Jimmy Jamco. However, it backfires quickly.
35	9	"Ho Ho Ha"	December 7, 2011
The cast are having trouble finding someone to play Santa. However, Kayla finds a man to be Santa, but he causes havoc.
36	10	"Educating Kayla"	December 14, 2011
Kayla and James put together an ad for Jamco University, and end up learning things themselves.
37	11	"Sleepover"	January 12, 2012
Hannah tries to make some friends that are girls by having a sleepover. Daniel Book learns about science.
38	12	"Joey Phones Home"	February 9, 2012
39	13	"That's So Musical"	March 8, 2012

=== Specials ===
- "That's So Scary!" – Put in an online version, and a televised version. Both have different sketches from each other. For example, the online version has the sketch "Ghost Chasers", while the televised version has "The Mom Whisperer" instead.

=== Minis ===
A series of four mini episodes were made, featuring sketches from the first and second seasons without any sitcom content. The theme song from the second season plays without any opening sketch.

== Recurring sketches ==
- Every episode shows something going on with the team. In Season two, Kayla develops a crush on James who develops a crush on Hannah.
- "This is Daniel Book" – A parody of the real-life, preschool TV show This is Daniel Cook, except this is Daniel Book who is nineteen years old instead of six years old, but acts as if he is six years old. Daniel has gone of various adventures, such as dating and snowboarding.
- "Talking with Logan and Wilf" – Two boys that are played by girls talk about various things.
- "Poptrendz" – A parody of entertainment news shows like etalk or Entertainment Tonight, Poptrendz is a show with various guest stars talking and doing adventures. Some of these are James meeting Eva, and interviews with Mario and Peach, Hogwarts Students, etc.
- "Raptoritis" – A boy is afflicted with a rare condition where loud noises cause him to act like a velociraptor.
- "Like a Doctor" – A man who thinks he's a doctor because he has seen every episode of Grey's Anatomy ever made.
- "Abby and Trevor" (unofficial name) – A series where Abby reads incredibly weird things out loud to Trevor, who has a crush on Abby. Unfortunately Trevor has a very hard time trying to clearly explaining his crush.
- Jamco commercials and their production – Appearing in most episodes where the gang receives a product from the fictional company Jamco and have to make a commercial for it. Products include "Extra-cise", "Combo-cise", "Chock-lick" and "Invisiball".

== Awards and nominations ==
Year	Award	Category	Recipient(s)	Result
2010	Gemini Awards	Best Children's or Youth Fiction Program or Series	Jeff Copeland, Charles Bishop, Michael Donovan, Floyd Kane, Gary Pearson	Nominated
2010	Gemini Awards	Best Performance in a Children's or Youth Program or Series	Kayla Lorette	Nominated

2011 Gemini Award Nomination

Best Children's or Youth Fiction Program or Series That's So Weird, Gary Pearson Michael Donovan, Charles Bishop

2011 Canadian Comedy Awards-

Best Television Performance, Ensemble: James Hartnett, Hannah Hogan, Alana Johnston, Kayla Lorette, Joey Lucius, Alex Spencer, AJ Vaage (That's So Weird) (winner)

2013 – Canadian Screen Award Nominations.

Best Children's or Youth Fiction Program or Series – That's So Weird! Gary Pearson, Michael Donovan, Charles Bishop

Best Writing in a Variety or Sketch Comedy Program or Series – That's So Weird! Mike Allison, Jan Caruana, James Hartnett, Alana Johnston, Jerry Schaefer, Gary Pearson, Duncan McKenzie
