= Endlings (TV series) =

Canadian television science fiction series

- Genre: Science fiction
- Created by: J. J. Johnson
- Starring: Edison Grant; Kamaia Fairburn; Michela Luci; Cale Thomas Ferrin; Neil Crone; Oyin Oladejo; Lisa Ryder
- Composer: Virginia Kilbertus
- Country of origin: Canada
- Original language: English
- No. of seasons: 2
- No. of episodes: 24

Production
- Production company: Sinking Ship Entertainment

Original release
- Network: CBC Television
- Release: January 5, 2020 – January 15, 2021

Endlings is a Canadian science fiction television series that premiered on January 5, 2020 on CBC Television. The series is produced by Sinking Ship Entertainment. Endlings premiered in the US on Hulu on January 17, 2019.

In October 2019, the series was renewed for a second twelve-episode season.

== Premise ==
The series centres on four young children living with a foster father, Mr. Leopold (Neil Crone) on a farm, who discover an extraterrestrial alien on their property after its spaceship crashes, and become drawn into the adventure of helping the alien in its mission to save endangered species.

== Plot ==
=== Season 1 ===
The season begins in the year 2040 when an alien being abducts the last elephant on Earth, Tuko, from the African wildlife refuge where she's lived since she was orphaned as a baby. But before the Alien can leave Earth's atmosphere, its ship malfunctions and crash lands on a farm in North America. The crash happens just as Mr. Leopold, the foster parent who owns the farm, is about to take in Julia, a new foster kid, to join his other wards: Johnny, Tabby and Finn.

Almost as soon as she arrives, Julia runs away but finding the last elephant on Earth in one of Mr. Leopold's cornfields makes her turn back. While Julia, Johnny, Tabby and Finn are not fast friends, they do learn to work together when they discover that an alien ship has crashed into the barn with an injured alien inside and another escaped insect alien loose on the farm.

Julia, though initially wary of her newfound family, slowly learns to trust her fellow foster kids. But just as she grows more comfortable opening up to the others about the struggles she experienced prior to ending up at the Leopold farmstead, Johnny, Tabby and Finn start to reveal painful memories from their pasts.

At the same time, the Alien, unfamiliar with Earth's natural environment and unable to communicate directly with its new caretakers, is steadily growing weaker. Fortunately, Abiona Maina, the wildlife activist who cared for Tuko at the refuge, manages to track the elephant down to Mr. Leopold's farm. After she's convinced that the Alien isn't evil, Abiona uses her knowledge of animals to save its life.

The children have a lot to deal with but have each other to rely upon. This growing bond is helpful as it will take their combined talents to recapture the endlings released when the Alien's ship crashed into their barn. These include endlings that communicate in a variety of different ways, like frequencies too high or too low for humans to hear, endlings that are more bark than bite, as well as endlings that the children want to keep, even though they shouldn't.

=== Season 2 ===
The year is 2041; Julia, Johnny, Tabby and Finn continue to help their extraterrestrial friend Ling save fantastical endlings. With the aid of their foster father Mr. Leopold and animal activist Dr. Abiona Maina the group is getting closer to receiving the remaining 'last of their kind' creatures and completing their mission.

But when Ling accidentally shows Tabby a vision of their quest failing, the team learns that Ling's powers don't just shows their pasts but also their futures. This glimpse of what's to come reveals Tresa Hewes CEO of Infinitum Corporation, who has been tracking them on her own elusive reasons, capturing Ling and the endlings and tearing the foster family apart.

Together, the group makes the choice to confront the pain of their pasts in order to change their futures and save Ling. This decision to fight fate, kicks off a season of high-octane adventure where four wounded teens must learn to let their hopes, not their hurts, shape their future.

== Cast ==
- Edison Grant as Johnny, the eldest child and first child to arrive at the Leopold household. Johnny works hard to make sure the farm feels like the first real home for the other kids, just like it does for him.
- Kamaia Fairburn as Julia, the latest addition to the Leopold household. Ever since the sudden loss of her father, Julia has just been mad — mad at the world, mad at her situation, mad at her sadness. However, the more time she spends with her new foster family the more she warms up to them.
- Michela Luci as Tabby, the second-youngest child and the engineer of the family. Tabby has a sharp tongue and quick wit which developed from constantly being let down by a lot of people in her life.
- Cale Thomas Ferrin as Finn, the youngest child on the farm. Finn doesn't speak a word but communicates his love through his colorful drawings, his expressive face or his hugs.
- Neil Crone as Mr. Kenneth Leopold, the foster parent of the four kids. Mr. Leopold knows that what these kids need is someone to believe in them, because the world doesn't.
- Oyin Oladejo as Abiona Maina, Tuko's caretaker, a wildlife activist who spent her childhood growing up around animals. Her fight to keep Tuko safe leads her to the Leopold farm.
- Lisa Ryder as Tresa Hewes, an intelligent forward lead who is part of a special division of the government that tracks unexplained phenomenon.

== Episodes ==
Season	Episodes	Originally released	
Season	Episodes	First released	Last released
1	12	January 3, 2020	March 5, 2020
2	12	January 15, 2021	

=== Season 1 (2020) ===
No. overall	No. in season	Title	Directed by	Written by	Original release date	Canada viewers (millions)
1	1	"The End is the Beginning (Part 1)"	J. J. Johnson	J.J. Johnson	January 3, 2020	N/A
2	2	"The End is the Beginning (Part 2)"	J.J. Johnson	J.J. Johnson	January 3, 2020	N/A
3	3	"The Elephant in the Room"	Melanie Orr	J.J. Johnson	January 12, 2020	N/A
4	4	"The Enemy of My Enemy"	Melanie Orr	J.J. Johnson and Christin Simms	January 15, 2020	N/A
5	5	"Curiosity"	Annie Bradley	Mark De Angelis	January 20, 2020	N/A
6	6	"Surprise"	Annie Bradley	Alejandro Alcoba	January 22, 2020	N/A
7	7	"Home"	Stephen Reynolds	Caitlin D. Fryers	January 30, 2020	N/A
8	8	"Found and Lost"	Annie Bradley	Bonnie Fairweather	January 31, 2020	N/A
9	9	"Are You Afraid of the Light?"	J.J. Johnson	J.J. Johnson	February 3, 2020	N/A
10	10	"Invisible"	Melanie Orr	Thomas Conway	February 5, 2020	N/A
11	11	"Extinction"	Stephen Reynolds	J.J. Johnson and Christin Simms	February 12, 2020	N/A
12	12	"The End Is the Beginning Is the End"	Stephen Reynolds	J.J. Johnson and Christin Simms	February 18, 2020	N/A

=== Season 2 (2021) ===
No. overall	No. in season	Title	Directed by	Written by	Original release date	Canada viewers (millions)
13	1	"Still Hunting"	Unknown	Unknown	January 15, 2021	N/A
14	2	"What We May Be"	Unknown	Unknown	January 15, 2021	N/A
15	3	"The Other"	Unknown	Unknown	January 15, 2021	N/A
16	4	"I, Me, We"	Unknown	Unknown	January 15, 2021	N/A
17	5	"Sparked"	Unknown	Unknown	January 15, 2021	N/A
18	6	"Lightning in a Bottle"	Unknown	Unknown	January 15, 2021	N/A
19	7	"Found in Translation"	Unknown	Unknown	January 15, 2021	N/A
20	8	"Unwelcome Home"	Unknown	Unknown	January 15, 2021	N/A
21	9	"Save Yourself"	Unknown	Unknown	January 15, 2021	N/A
22	10	"Fight or Flight"	Unknown	Unknown	January 15, 2021	N/A
23	11	"The Beginning is the End is the Beginning"	Unknown	Unknown	January 15, 2021	N/A
24	12	"One World, One Family"	Unknown	Unknown	January 15, 2021	N/A

== Production ==
Season One was filmed in and around the city of Guelph, Ontario and the second season was scheduled to also be filmed in that city, starting January 6, 2020. Production of the second season commenced in October 2019.

== Broadcast ==
In addition to CBC and Hulu, the series will air on Universal Kids in the US, CBBC in the UK, Norddeutscher Rundfunk in Germany, ABC Me in Australia, Sveriges Television in Sweden, NRK in Norway, and Gloob in Brazil.
