= Canadian Screen Awards =

Canadian media awards

- Current: 14th Canadian Screen Awards
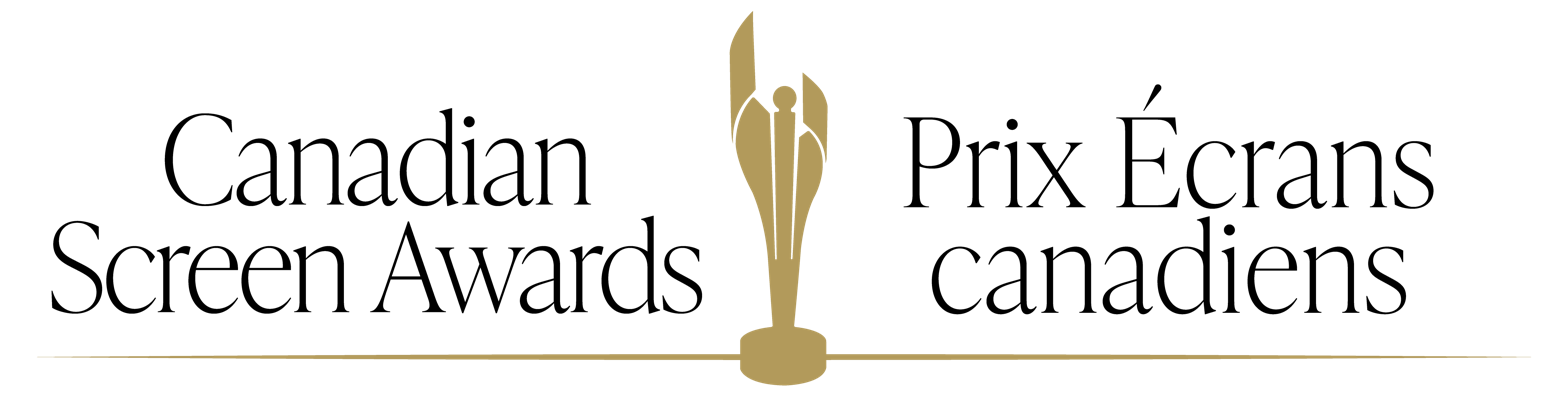
- Awarded for: Artistic and technical merit in the Canadian film industry, recognizing excellence in film, television and digital media
- Country: Canada
- Presented by: Academy of Canadian Cinema & Television
- First award: 2013 as a merger of the former Genie Awards for film and Gemini Awards for television
- Website: academy.ca/awards

The Canadian Screen Awards (French: Les prix Écrans canadiens) are awards given for artistic and technical merit in the film industry recognizing excellence in Canadian film, English-language television, and digital media (web series) productions. Given annually by the Academy of Canadian Cinema & Television, the awards recognize excellence in cinematic achievements, as assessed by the Academy's voting membership.

The awards were first presented in 2013 as the result of a merger of the Gemini Awards and Genie Awards—the Academy's previous awards presentations for television (English-language) and film productions. They are widely considered to be the most prestigious award for Canadian entertainers, artists, and filmmakers, often referred to as the equivalent of the Academy Awards and Emmy Awards in the United States, the BAFTA Awards in the United Kingdom, the AACTA Awards in Australia, the IFTA Awards in Ireland, the César Awards in France and the Goya Awards in Spain.

== History ==
Canadian Screen Awards trophy

The award's historic roots stem from the Canadian Film Awards, which were presented for film from 1949 to 1978, and the ACTRA Awards, which were presented for television from 1972 to 1986. The Academy took over the CFAs in 1978 to create the new Genie Awards, and took over the ACTRAs in 1986 to create the Gemini Awards. The Academy additionally created the Bijou Awards in 1981 as a new home for CFA specialty categories, such as television films, that had not been retained by the Genie Awards, but presented them only once before discontinuing that program.

In April 2012, the Academy announced that it would merge the Geminis and the Genies into a new awards show that would better recognize Canadian accomplishments in film, television, and digital media. On 4 September 2012, the Academy announced that the new ceremony would be known as the Canadian Screen Awards, reflecting the multi-platform nature of the presentation's expanded scope and how Canadians consume media content. The inaugural ceremony, hosted by comedian Martin Short and broadcast by CBC Television, took place on 3 March 2013.

Due to the number of awards presented, many of the less prominent awards have been presented at a series of untelevised galas during Canadian Screen Week, the week leading up to the televised ceremonies. For the 13th Canadian Screen Awards in 2025, the Academy opted to reduce the length of these advance events, which will now be held entirely on the Friday and Saturday immediately before the main gala.

Due to the COVID-19 pandemic, the Canadian Screen Awards did not hold an in-person presentation between 2020 and 2022. All ceremonies were held as virtual events beginning with the 8th Canadian Screen Awards, with the non-televised galas replaced by streaming presentations during Canadian Screen Week, with no television broadcast. The 10th Canadian Screen Awards were originally scheduled to be held at the TIFF Bell Lightbox in Toronto, but due to Omicron variant and restrictions being reimplemented in the province of Ontario, the presentation was once again held as a virtual event. A television presentation returned, with winners in top categories announced during an hour-long, pre-recorded special on CBC Television hosted by TallBoyz.

While in-person presentations were reinstated for 2023, the broadcast on CBC Television remained a pre-recorded special featuring highlights from the non-televised galas, linked by host Samantha Bee, rather than a live event.

In August 2022, the Academy announced that it would discontinue its past practice of presenting gendered awards for film and television actors and actresses; beginning with the 11th Canadian Screen Awards in 2023, gender-neutral awards for Best Performance will be presented, with eight nominees per category instead of five. In 2023, the Academy announced further changes for the 12th Canadian Screen Awards, instituting a new genre separation for best leading and supporting performances in drama and comedy films, and introducing a new category for best performance in a live action short film. No change was introduced in television acting categories, which already feature a genre separation for drama and comedy.

At the 12th Canadian Screen Awards, the film BlackBerry, which documented the rise and fall of the BlackBerry phone, broke the record for the most nominations for a film in the history of the Canadian Screen Awards, with 17 nominations.

In January 2026, it was announced that the 14th Canadian Screen Awards would be simulcast by CBC Television, CTV Television Network, and Global Television Network, in a partnership between the Canadian Broadcasting Corporation, Bell Media, and Corus Entertainment. It will also be streamed online by CBC Gem, Crave, and StackTV.

=== Name ===
As of 2026, the Academy has not announced any official nickname, such as "Oscar" for the Academy Awards. Many Canadian television and film critics and others have suggested potential nicknames, including the straightforward abbreviation "Screenies"; tributes to film and television legends including "Candys" in memory of actor John Candy, "Pickfords" in honour of actress Mary Pickford and "Normans" in honour of director Norman Jewison; "Angels" as a descriptive reference to the trophy's "wings"; and "Gemininies" as a portmanteau of the awards' former names.

The Academy invited suggestions from viewers via social media, with CEO Helga Stephenson suggesting that the board would consider the suggestions and potentially announce a naming choice in time for the 2014 ceremony. No formal nickname was announced at the time; numerous media outlets settled on the informal "Screenies".

At the 4th Canadian Screen Awards in 2016, host Norm Macdonald called in his opening monologue for the awards to be named the Candys; several presenters and winners followed his lead throughout the evening, referring to the award as "The Candy" in their presentation announcements or acceptance speeches, and John Candy's former SCTV colleagues Eugene Levy and Catherine O'Hara both endorsed Macdonald's proposal in the press room. Macdonald had not sought input from the Academy itself prior to his monologue, although he ran the idea past the ceremony's broadcast producer Barry Avrich. At the 5th Canadian Screen Awards in 2017, host Howie Mandel made a recurring joke of suggesting that they be nicknamed "STDs" (an abbreviation of "screen, television, and digital", but a double entendre of another use of the abbreviation). The show is currently commonly known as the CSAs.

== Rules ==
To be eligible for nominations, a title must be either a Canadian production or co-production; international film or television projects shot in Canada without direct Canadian production involvement are not eligible. Until 2025, Canadians could not receive nominations for working on foreign productions that were not otherwise eligible for CSA consideration, but foreign nationals could be nominated for work on eligible Canadian films; in that year, the Academy introduced a new rule restricting the nominees to Canadian citizens and permanent residents, as well as introducing four new "Spotlight" categories to honour work by Canadian producers, directors, writers and actors on international television series made and broadcast in Canada.

A feature film must have received at least one full week of commercial theatrical screenings in at least two of the Calgary, Edmonton, Halifax, Montreal, Ottawa, Quebec City, Saskatoon, St. John's, Toronto, Vancouver, Victoria and/or Winnipeg markets between 1 January of the qualifying year and the date of the awards ceremony in the presentation year. A film may be submitted and even nominated before it has fully met these criteria, so long as it can provide satisfactory proof that the criteria will be fulfilled by the date of the ceremony.

Film festival screenings are not directly relevant to the inclusion criteria for feature films; as long as it meets the commercial screening criteria, a film may in fact have had its initial film festival premiere up to 1.5 years earlier than 1 January of the qualifying year. Although due to the more periodic nature of Canadian film distribution it may be possible for a film to meet the qualifying criteria in more than one separate year, a film may not be resubmitted to the awards committee more than once. The eligibility criteria for feature films have sometimes faced criticism from some independent film producers, however, as they effectively excluded films which pursue distribution strategies more strongly based on streaming media platforms such as Netflix or Crave from consideration in film categories — unlike the Academy Awards, where the eligibility rules permit films from streaming services. Despite this conflict, films which premiered theatrically, but did not surpass the theatrical screening criteria and thus were never submitted in film categories before being released on a television or streaming platform, are eligible to receive nominations in the television categories; as well, the more flexible eligibility criteria noted below, which were introduced during the COVID-19 pandemic in light of the disruptions that it caused to film distribution, remain in place as of 2024 despite the reopening of movie theatres, and thus now permit some films distributed on streaming platforms to enter film categories.

Under certain circumstances, it may also be possible for a film to be nominated in both film and television categories. For example, the 2021 documentary film One of Ours was a nominee for Best Feature Length Documentary at the 10th Canadian Screen Awards in 2022 due to its theatrical run; however, as the Academy does not present awards for best direction or best writing in theatrical documentary films, but does present awards for best direction and writing in television documentaries, its television broadcast later in the year earned Yasmine Mathurin nominations in the television categories at the same ceremony. However, a film cannot be considered in both film and television categories that directly duplicate each other; for instance, a film cannot be considered for both Best Picture and Best TV Movie.

Due to the impact of the COVID-19 pandemic on theatrical film distribution in 2020, special rules for the 9th Canadian Screen Awards permitted films that were commercially screened on an Academy-approved list of video on demand platforms after having been planned for conventional theatrical distribution, as well as films that were screened online as part of any Canadian film festival that proceeded virtually in 2020; as well, the number of commercial theatrical screenings required for eligibility was temporarily reduced to just four screenings in one of the regular markets. Other new changes at the 9th ceremony included the renaming of the Overall Sound category to Sound Mixing, and the introduction of a new category for Best Casting in films.

Feature documentaries are eligible if they have received three commercial theatrical screenings anywhere in Canada within the same time period as narrative features, or if they have screened at two qualifying film festivals within the calendar year. Animated short films are eligible if they have received one commercial theatrical screening anywhere in Canada, or have been screened at two qualifying festivals, within the calendar year; live action short films are eligible if they have received one commercial theatrical screening anywhere in Canada, or have been screened at three qualifying festivals, within the calendar year. Documentary and short films are also automatically deemed eligible for nomination if they have won an award at an eligible Canadian or international film festival within the qualifying period, even if they have not fully met the Canadian screening criteria.

For television categories, the qualifying period corresponds more closely to the traditional television season than the calendar year, beginning 1 September of the second year before the ceremony and ending, depending on the category, either 31 August or 15 November of the year before the ceremony. An ongoing television series whose season straddles the cutoff date for its category is still eligible if it has aired at least one-third of its episodes within the eligibility period; if it does not meet that test, then it must wait until the following year. However, there have been instances of a television series not meeting these rules, but being included in nominations following an appeal to the Academy, such as the drama series Heated Rivalry receiving nominations at the 14th Canadian Screen Awards in 2026 despite the fact that the normal criteria would have deferred its eligibility to the 2027 ceremony.

== Awards ceremonies ==
Ceremony	Date	Best Motion Picture	Best Dramatic Series	Best Comedy Series	Host	Location	Broadcaster
Prior to 2013, see Genie Awards for film and Gemini Awards for television.
1st	3 March 2013	War Witch (Rebelle)	Flashpoint	Less Than Kind	Martin Short	Sony Centre for the Performing Arts	CBC
2nd	9 March 2014	Gabrielle	Orphan Black	Call Me Fitz	Martin Short	Sony Centre for the Performing Arts	CBC
3rd	1 March 2015	Mommy	Orphan Black	Call Me Fitz	Andrea Martin	Four Seasons Centre for the Performing Arts	CBC
4th	13 March 2016	Room	19–2	Schitt's Creek	Norm Macdonald	Sony Centre for the Performing Arts	CBC
5th	12 March 2017	It's Only the End of the World (Juste la fin du monde)	Orphan Black	Letterkenny	Howie Mandel	Sony Centre for the Performing Arts	CBC
6th	11 March 2018	Maudie	Anne with an E	Kim's Convenience	Jonny Harris & Emma Hunter	Sony Centre for the Performing Arts	CBC
7th	31 March 2019	A Colony (Une colonie)	Anne with an E	Schitt's Creek	No host	Sony Centre for the Performing Arts	CBC
8th	25–28 May 2020	Antigone	Cardinal	Schitt's Creek	various	Ceremonies cancelled; awards presented via virtual event.	
9th	17–20 May 2021	Beans	Transplant	Schitt's Creek	various	Ceremonies cancelled; awards presented via virtual event.	
10th	10 April 2022	Scarborough	Transplant	Sort Of	TallBoyz	Ceremonies cancelled; awards presented via virtual event and television special.	CBC
11th	16 April 2023	Brother	The Porter	Sort Of	Samantha Bee	Meridian Hall	CBC
12th	31 May 2024	Blackberry	Little Bird	Bria Mack Gets a Life	Mae Martin	Canadian Broadcasting Centre	CBC
13th	1 June 2025	The Apprentice	Law & Order Toronto: Criminal Intent	Children Ruin Everything	Lisa Gilroy	Canadian Broadcasting Centre	CBC
14th	31 May 2026	Nirvanna the Band the Show the Movie	Heated Rivalry	North of North	Andrew Phung	Canadian Broadcasting Centre	CBC; CTV; Global; CBC Gem; Crave; StackTV

== Awards categories ==
The Canadian Screen Awards has roughly 130 categories in total. There are 30 film categories, 100 television categories, and 10 digital media categories. As with the Genie Awards, all Canadian films, regardless of language, are eligible to receive awards in the film categories. However, as with the Gemini Awards, only English-language productions are eligible for television categories: the Academy continues to hold the Prix Gémeaux, a separate ceremony honouring French-language television productions.

=== Film ===
- Best Motion Picture
- Best Feature Length Documentary (Ted Rogers Award)
- Best Short Documentary
- Best Live Action Short Drama
- Best Animated Short
- Best Director
- Best Original Screenplay
- Best Adapted Screenplay
- Best Lead Performance in a Comedy Film
- Best Lead Performance in a Drama Film
- Best Supporting Performance in a Comedy Film
- Best Supporting Performance in a Drama Film
- Best Performance in a Live Action Short Drama
- Best Art Direction / Production Design
- Best Casting (Film)
- Best Cinematography
- Best Cinematography in a Documentary
- Best Editing
- Best Editing in a Documentary
- Best Costume Design
- Best Makeup
- Best Hair
- Best Original Score
- Best Original Song
- Best Original Music in a Documentary
- Best Visual Effects
- Best Sound Editing
- Best Sound Mixing
- Best Sound Design in a Documentary
- Best Stunt Coordination

Defunct categories:

- Best Performance in a Leading Role in a Film (2022 only)
  - formerly Best Actor and Best Actress, 2012 to 2022
- Best Performance in a Supporting Role in a Film (2022 only)
  - formerly Best Supporting Actor and Best Supporting Actress, 2012 to 2022

=== Television ===
- Best Dramatic Series
- Best Comedy Series
- Best Animated Program or Series
- Best Biography or Arts Documentary Program or Series
- Best Children's or Youth Fiction Program or Series
- Best Children's or Youth Non-Fiction Program or Series
- Best Documentary Program
- Best Factual Program or Series
- Best History Documentary Program or Series
- Best Lifestyle Program or Series
- Best Live Entertainment Special
- Best Music Program or Series
- Best National Newscast
- Best Local Newscast
- Best News or Information Series
- Best News or Information Program
- Best News Special
- Best News or Information Segment
- Best Reportage, National
- Best Reportage, Local
- Best Performing Arts Program
- Best Pre-School Program or Series
- Best Reality/Competition Program or Series
- Best Science or Nature Documentary Program or Series (Rob Stewart Award)
- Best Live Sports Event
- Best Sports Program or Series
- Best Sports Feature Segment
- Best Sports Opening/Tease
- Best Talk Program or Series
- Best Limited Series or Program
- Best Variety or Sketch Comedy Program or Series
- Best Social/Political Documentary Program (Donald Brittain Award)
- Best Direction in a Dramatic Series
- Best Direction in a Dramatic Program or Limited Series
- Best Direction in a Comedy Program or Series
- Best Direction in an Animated Program or Series
- Best Direction in a Children's or Youth Program or Series
- Best Direction in a Documentary or Factual Series
- Best Direction in a Documentary Program
- Best Direction in a Lifestyle or Information Program or Series
- Best Direction in a Live Sporting Event
- Best Direction in a Reality/Competition Program or Series
- Best Direction in a Variety or Sketch Comedy Program or Series
- Best Casting (Television)
- Best Actor in a Continuing Leading Dramatic Role
- Best Actress in a Continuing Leading Dramatic Role
- Best Actor in a Leading Role in a Dramatic Program or Limited Series
- Best Actress in a Leading Role in a Dramatic Program or Limited Series
- Best Supporting Actor in a Dramatic Program or Series
- Best Supporting Actress in a Dramatic Program or Series
- Best Guest Performance in a Dramatic Series
- Best Actor in a Continuing Leading Comedic Role
- Best Actress in a Continuing Leading Comedic Role
- Best Supporting Actor in a Comedic Series
- Best Supporting Actress in a Comedic Series
- Best Guest Performance in a Comedy Series
- Best Performance in an Animated Program or Series
- Best Performance in a Children's or Youth Program or Series
- Best Performance in a Variety or Sketch Comedy Program or Series (Individual or Ensemble)
- Best Host in a Lifestyle, Talk or Entertainment News Program or Series
- Best Host in a Variety or Reality/Competition Program or Series
- Best Host or Interviewer in a News or Information Program or Series
- Best News Anchor, National
- Best News Anchor, Local
- Best Sports Analyst
- Best Sports Host
- Best Sports Play-by-Play Announcer
- Best Writing in a Dramatic Series
- Best Writing in a Dramatic Program or Limited Series
- Best Writing in a Comedy Program or Series
- Best Writing in an Animated Program or Series
- Best Writing in a Children's or Youth Program or Series
- Best Writing in a Documentary Program or Series
- Best Writing in a Factual Program or Series
- Best Writing in a Lifestyle or Reality/Competition Program or Series
- Best Writing in a Variety or Sketch Comedy Program or Series
- Barbara Sears Award for Best Editorial Research
- Barbara Sears Award for Best Visual Research
- Best Production Design/Art Direction in a Fiction Program or Series
- Best Production Design/Art Direction in a Non-Fiction Program or Series
- Best Photography in a Dramatic Program or Series
- Best Photography in a Comedy Program or Series
- Best Photography in a Documentary Program or Factual Series
- Best Photography in a Lifestyle or Reality/Competition Program or Series
- Best Photography in a News or Information Program, Series or Segment
- Best Photography in a Variety Program or Series
- Best Costume Design
- Best Picture Editing in a Dramatic Program or Series
- Best Picture Editing in a Comedy Program or Series
- Best Picture Editing in a Documentary Program or Series
- Best Picture Editing in a Factual Program or Series
- Best Picture Editing in a Reality/Competition Program or Series
- Best Picture Editing in a Variety or Sketch Comedy Program or Series
- Best Sound in a Comedy or Dramatic Program or Series
- Best Sound in a Non-Fiction Program or Series
- Best Sound in a Variety or Animated Program or Series
- Best Original Music for a Non-Fiction Program or Series
- Best Original Music Score for a Series
- Best Original Music Score for a Program
- Best Makeup
- Best Visual Effects

=== Digital media ===
- Best Cross-Platform Project – Children's and Youth
- Best Cross-Platform Project – Fiction
- Best Cross-Platform Project – Non-Fiction
- Best Immersive Experience
- Best Original Interactive Production Produced for Digital Media
- Best Original Program or Series Produced for Digital Media – Fiction
- Best Original Program or Series Produced for Digital Media – Non-Fiction
- Best Direction in a Program or Series Produced for Digital Media
- Best Actor in a Program or Series Produced for Digital Media
- Best Actress in a Program or Series Produced for Digital Media
- Social Innovator Award

== Special categories ==
- Academy Achievement Award
- Best First Feature
- Board of Directors' Tribute
- Digital Media Trailblazing Award
- Diversity Award
- Earle Grey Award
- Fan Choice Award
- Cogeco Fund Audience Choice Award
- Golden Screen Award
- Gordon Sinclair Award
- Humanitarian Award
- Icon Award
- Legacy Award
- Lifetime Achievement Award
- Margaret Collier Award
- Outstanding Technical Achievement Award
- Radius Award
- Shaw Rocket Fund Kids' Choice Award

== See also ==
- Canadian television awards
- Prix Iris
