= Canadian Screen Award for Best Pre-School Program or Series =

Annual Canadian television award

The Canadian Screen Award for Best Pre-School Program or Series is an annual television award, presented by the Academy of Canadian Cinema and Television to honour the year's best television programming for preschool children produced in Canada.

The award was first presented in 1998 as part of the Gemini Awards program. Prior to 1998, programming for preschool children was eligible for the Gemini Award for Best Children's or Youth Program or Series.

Since 2013, the award has been presented as part of the Canadian Screen Awards.

== Winners and nominees ==
Due to the distinction between the former Gemini Awards, which were usually presented in the late fall of the same year that the awards were presented for, and the current Canadian Screen Awards, which are presented early in the following year, awards are listed below under the year of eligibility rather than the year of presentation for consistency.

=== 1990s ===
Year	Show	Producers	Ref
1997; 12th Gemini Awards
1997; 12th Gemini Awards	Little Bear	Patrick Loubert, Michael Hirsh, Clive A. Smith	
1997; 12th Gemini Awards	Groundling Marsh	Lisa Olfman, John Delmage, Joy Rosen	
1997; 12th Gemini Awards	Guess What?	Susan Sheehan	
1997; 12th Gemini Awards	Once Upon a Hamster	Paul Sutherland	
1997; 12th Gemini Awards	Theodore Tugboat	Andrew Cochran	
1998; 13th Gemini Awards
1998; 13th Gemini Awards	Theodore Tugboat	Andrew Cochran	
1998; 13th Gemini Awards	Franklin	Patrick Loubert, Patricia Burns, Paul Hannequart, Michael Hirsh, Stephen Hodgins, Marc Minjauw, Clive A. Smith	
1998; 13th Gemini Awards	Guess What?	Susan Sheehan	
1998; 13th Gemini Awards	Once Upon a Hamster	Paul Sutherland	
1998; 13th Gemini Awards	Wimzie's House	Micheline Charest, Patricia Lavoie, Ronald A. Weinberg	
1999; 14th Gemini Awards
1999; 14th Gemini Awards	Sesame Park	Duncan Lamb, Susan Sheehan, Wendy Smith	
1999; 14th Gemini Awards	Panda Bear Daycare	John Leitch, Cheryl Wagner, Rob Mills	
1999; 14th Gemini Awards	Ruffus the Dog	John Leitch, Cheryl Wagner, Rob Mills	

=== 2000s ===
Year	Show	Producers	Ref
2000; 15th Gemini Awards
2000; 15th Gemini Awards	Polka Dot Shorts	Jed MacKay	
2000; 15th Gemini Awards	Panda Bear Daycare	John Leitch, Rob Mills	
2000; 15th Gemini Awards	Polkaroo's Number Wonders	Marie McCann	
2000; 15th Gemini Awards	Ruffus the Dog	John Leitch, Rob Mills	
2000; 15th Gemini Awards	Scoop and Doozie	Romney Grant	
2001; 16th Gemini Awards
2001; 16th Gemini Awards	Sesame Park	Duncan Lamb, Susan Sheehan, Wendy Smith	
2001; 16th Gemini Awards	Land O' Hands	John Leitch, Rob Mills	
2001; 16th Gemini Awards	The Nook Counting Network	Marie McCann, Kim Wilson	
2002; 17th Gemini Awards
2002; 17th Gemini Awards	Maggie and the Ferocious Beast	Betty Paraskevas, Stephen Hodgins, Marianne Culbert, Patrick Loubert, Cynthia Taylor, Patricia R. Burns, Clive A. Smith, Michael Hirsh, Michael Paraskevas	
2002; 17th Gemini Awards	Caillou	Peter Moss, Cassandra Schafhausen	
2002; 17th Gemini Awards	The Nook Counting Network	Karen Young, Marney Berube, Laura James, Gisèle Corinthios, Marie McCann	
2002; 17th Gemini Awards	Scoop and Doozie	Romney Grant	
2002; 17th Gemini Awards	Wumpa's World	Greg Dummett, Luc Martineau	
2003; 18th Gemini Awards
2003; 18th Gemini Awards	The Toy Castle	Katherine Jeans, Neil Bregman	
2003; 18th Gemini Awards	The Save-Ums!	Kym Hyde, Neil Court, Steve Denure, Beth Stevenson	
2003; 18th Gemini Awards	Simon in the Land of Chalk Drawings	Cassandra Schafhausen, Peter Moss, Lesley Taylor	
2004; 19th Gemini Awards
2004; 19th Gemini Awards	Poko	Michael Donovan, Charles Bishop, Jeff Rosen	
2004; 19th Gemini Awards	The Berenstain Bears	Scott Dyer, Stan and Jan Berenstain, Michael Hirsh, Steven Ching	
2004; 19th Gemini Awards	The Big Comfy Couch	Cheryl Wagner, John Leitch, Rob Mills	
2004; 19th Gemini Awards	The Hoobs	Mellie Buse, Angus Fletcher, Steve Denure, Beth Stevenson, Peter Coogan, Sue Taylor	
2004; 19th Gemini Awards	Nanalan'	Jason Hopley, Jack Lenz, Jamie Shannon	
2004; 19th Gemini Awards	The Save-Ums!	Kym Hyde, Neil Court, Steve Denure, Beth Stevenson, John Mariella	
2005; 20th Gemini Awards
2005; 20th Gemini Awards	Peep and the Big Wide World	Kate Taylor, Vince Commisso, Marisa Wolsky	
2005; 20th Gemini Awards	Franny's Feet	Steve Denure, Elana Adair, Neil Court, John Mariella, Beth Stevenson	
2005; 20th Gemini Awards	Poko	Michael Donovan, Charles Bishop, Jeff Rosen, Katrina Walsh, Cheryl Wagner	
2005; 20th Gemini Awards	The Secret World of Benjamin Bear	Sheldon S. Wiseman, Ken Anderson, Cherylyn Brooks, Mark Edwards	
2005; 20th Gemini Awards	This Is Daniel Cook	Matthew Bishop, Matthew Hornburg, J. J. Johnson, Blair Powers, Mark J.W. Bishop	
2006; 21st Gemini Awards
2006; 21st Gemini Awards	Gisèle's Big Backyard	Gisèle Corinthios, Marie McCann, Pat Ellingson, Ericka Evans	
2006; 21st Gemini Awards	Miss BG	Steven Hecht, Ira Levy, Marie-Pierre Moulinjeune, Kirsten Scollie, Peter Williamson, Kevin Gillis, Roberta Rae	
2006; 21st Gemini Awards	Miss Spider's Sunny Patch Friends	Nadine Van der Velde, Jocelyn Hamilton, Nicholas Callaway, Pam Lehn, Scott Dyer, Doug Murphy, Andy Russell, Patricia R. Burns, David Kirk	
2006; 21st Gemini Awards	Poko	Michael Donovan, Charles Bishop, Jeff Rosen, Katrina Walsh, Cheryl Wagner	
2006; 21st Gemini Awards	This Is Daniel Cook	Matthew Bishop, Matthew Hornburg, J.J. Johnson, Blair Powers, Mark J.W. Bishop	
2007; 22nd Gemini Awards
2007; 22nd Gemini Awards	The Backyardigans	Scott Dyer, Jocelyn Hamilton, Ellen Martin, Doug Murphy, Tracey Dodokin, Jennifer Hill, Janice Burgess, Robert Scull, Patricia R. Burns	
2007; 22nd Gemini Awards	The Doodlebops	Jamie Waese, Michael Hirsh	
2007; 22nd Gemini Awards	Roll Play	J. J. Johnson, Liz Haines, Blair Powers, Matt Bishop	
2007; 22nd Gemini Awards	This is Emily Yeung	Matthew Hornburg, Blair Powers, Mark J.W.Bishop, J. J. Johnson, Matt Bishop	
2007; 22nd Gemini Awards	Toopy and Binoo	Luc Châtelain, André A. Bélanger	
2008; 23rd Gemini Awards
2008; 23rd Gemini Awards	Will & Dewitt	Susie Grondin, Michael Hirsh, Pamela Slavin, Toni Stevens, Toper Taylor	
2008; 23rd Gemini Awards	Are We There Yet?: World Adventure	Blair Powers, J. J. Johnson, Matt Bishop	
2008; 23rd Gemini Awards	The Backyardigans	Scott Dyer, Jocelyn Hamilton, Ellen Martin, Doug Murphy, Jennifer Hill, Janice Burgess, Pam Lehn	
2008; 23rd Gemini Awards	Kids' Canada: I Care	Marie McCann, Phil McCordic, Erin Curtin, Jim Taylor, Nadine Henry, Patty Sullivan, Sid Bobb	
2008; 23rd Gemini Awards	Peep and the Big Wide World	Kate Taylor	
2009; 24th Gemini Awards
2009; 24th Gemini Awards	Kids' Canada	Marie McCann, Phil McCordic, Erin Curtin, Nadine Henry, Patty Sullivan, Sid Bobb	
2009; 24th Gemini Awards	Are We There Yet?: World Adventure	Blair Powers, J. J. Johnson, Matt Bishop	
2009; 24th Gemini Awards	Gisèle's Big Backyard	Kathilee Porter, Gisèle Corinthios, Pat Ellingson, Paul Gardner	
2009; 24th Gemini Awards	The Mighty Jungle	Michael Donovan, Charles Bishop, Cheryl Hassen, Beth Stevenson, Katrina Walsh	

=== 2010s ===
Year	Show	Producers	Ref
2010; 25th Gemini Awards
2010; 25th Gemini Awards	The Ocean Room	J. J. Johnson, Matthew Bishop, Blair Powers	
2010; 25th Gemini Awards	Dino Dan	J. J. Johnson, Matthew Bishop, Blair Powers	
2010; 25th Gemini Awards	Kids' Canada	Marie McCann, Phil McCordic, Erin Curtin, Nadine Henry, Patty Sullivan, Sid Bobb, Jim Taylor	
2010; 25th Gemini Awards	Peep and the Big Wide World	Vince Commisso, Kate Taylor, Marisa Wolsky	
2010; 25th Gemini Awards	Wibbly Pig	Vince Commisso, Will Brenton, Helen Cadwallader, Steven Jarosz, Iain Lauchlan, Natalie Osborne	
2011; 26th Gemini Awards
2011; 26th Gemini Awards	The Mighty Jungle	Katrina Walsh, Charles Bishop, Michael Donovan, Beth Stevenson	
2011; 26th Gemini Awards	Dino Dan	J.J. Johnson, Matthew Bishop, Blair Powers	
2011; 26th Gemini Awards	Gisèle's Big Backyard	Jennifer McAuley, Gisèle Corinthios, Pat Ellingson, Paul Gardner	
2011; 26th Gemini Awards	Kids' Canada: Wowie Woah Woah	Phil McCordic, Sid Bobb, Erin Curtin, Ali J. Eisner, Nadine Henry, Marie McCann, Patty Sullivan	
2011; 26th Gemini Awards	Stella and Sam	John Leitch, Michelle Melanson	
2012; 1st Canadian Screen Awards
2012; 1st Canadian Screen Awards	Stella & Sam	John Leitch, Michelle Melanson	
2012; 1st Canadian Screen Awards	Are We There Yet?: World Adventure	Blair Powers, J.J. Johnson, Matthew J.R. Bishop	
2012; 1st Canadian Screen Awards	Franklin and Friends	Doug Murphy, Pamela Lehn, Derek Reeves, Greg Chew, Jocelyn Hamilton, Mike Wiluan	
2012; 1st Canadian Screen Awards	My Big Big Friend	Peter Williamson, Ira Levy, André Breitman	
2013; 2nd Canadian Screen Awards
2013; 2nd Canadian Screen Awards	Justin Time	Brandon James Scott, Frank Falcone, Mary Bredin	
2013; 2nd Canadian Screen Awards	Monster Math Squad	Charles Bishop, Jeff Rosen, Katrina Walsh, Michael Donovan	
2013; 2nd Canadian Screen Awards	Rob the Robot	Craig Young, Jonathan Wiseman, Sheldon Wiseman	
2013; 2nd Canadian Screen Awards	Tumbletown Tales	Daniel Bourré, Marney Malabar, Pat Ellingson, Steve Diguer	
2014; 3rd Canadian Screen Awards
2014; 3rd Canadian Screen Awards	The Adventures of Napkin Man	Suzie Gallo, Ira Levy, Brenda Nietupski, Josh Selig, Sharon Summerling, Tone Thyne, Stephanie Van Bruggen, Peter Williamson	
2014; 3rd Canadian Screen Awards	Peg + Cat	Billy Aronson, Vince Commisso, Steve Jarosz, Kevin Morrison, Jennifer Oxley	
2014; 3rd Canadian Screen Awards	Stella and Sam Holiday Specials	John Leitch, Michelle Melanson	
2014; 3rd Canadian Screen Awards	Yup Yups	Matthew Fernandes, John Leitch, Michelle Melanson, Tammy Semen, Arthur Spanos	
2014; 3rd Canadian Screen Awards	Zerby Derby	Joan Lambur, Ira Levy, Phil McCordic, Peter Williamson	
2015; 4th Canadian Screen Awards
2015; 4th Canadian Screen Awards	Odd Squad	J.J. Johnson, Blair Powers, Timothy McKeon, Adam Peltzman, Paul Siefken, Matthew J.R. Bishop, Georgina López	
2015; 4th Canadian Screen Awards	Hi Opie!		
2015; 4th Canadian Screen Awards	Kate & Mim-Mim	Asaph Fipke, Chuck Johnson, Ken Faier	
2015; 4th Canadian Screen Awards	PAW Patrol	Scott Kraft, Keith Chapman, Ronnen Harary, Patricia Burns, Jennifer Dodge	
2015; 4th Canadian Screen Awards	You and Me	Jason Hopley, Charles Bishop, Katrina Walsh	
2016; 5th Canadian Screen Awards
2016; 5th Canadian Screen Awards	PAW Patrol	Scott Kraft, Marilyn McAuley, Patricia Burns, Keith Chapman, Laura Clunie, Ronnen Harary	
2016; 5th Canadian Screen Awards	The Adventures of Napkin Man	Ira Levy, Peter Williamson, Michael McGuigan, Nat Abraham, Joan Lambur	
2016; 5th Canadian Screen Awards	Kids' CBC Training Day	Carly Watt, Marie McCann	
2016; 5th Canadian Screen Awards	Peg + Cat	Steven Jarosz, Jennifer Oxley, Billy Aronson, Kevin Morrison, Tanya Green, Vince Commisso	
2016; 5th Canadian Screen Awards	Scout and the Gumboot Kids	Tara Hungerford, Eric Hogan, Dave Valleau, Tex Antonucci, Bruce Kahkesh, Vince Commisso, Lori Lozinski	
2017; 6th Canadian Screen Awards
2017; 6th Canadian Screen Awards	PAW Patrol	Scott Kraft, Laura Clunie, Ronnen Harary, Toni Stevens, Jonah Stroh, Patricia Burns, Keith Chapman	
2017; 6th Canadian Screen Awards	The Cat in the Hat Knows a Lot About That!	Lisa Olfman, Joy Rosen, Julie Stall, Dave Beatty	
2017; 6th Canadian Screen Awards	Dino Dana	J.J. Johnson, Blair Powers, Christin Simms, Matthew J.R. Bishop, Eric Beldowski	
2017; 6th Canadian Screen Awards	Justin Time	Frank Falcone, Mary Bredin	
2017; 6th Canadian Screen Awards	Max & Ruby	Colin Bohm, Scott Dyer, Megan Laughton, Diana Manson, Irene Weibel, Helen Lebeau, Melissa Graham	
2018; 7th Canadian Screen Awards
2018; 7th Canadian Screen Awards	Dino Dana	J. J. Johnson, Blair Powers, Christin Simms, Matthew J.R. Bishop, Eric Beldowski	
2018; 7th Canadian Screen Awards	The Cat in the Hat Knows a Lot About That!	Lisa Olfman, Joy Rosen, Lawrence S. Mirkin	
2018; 7th Canadian Screen Awards	Ranger Rob	Vanessa Esteves, Helen Lebeau, Alex Bar, Scott Dyer, Oliver Kane	
2018; 7th Canadian Screen Awards	Rusty Rivets	Jennifer Dodge, Laura Clunie, Ronnen Harary, Toni Stevens, Jonah Stroh, Jaelyn Galbraith, Jane Sobol	
2018; 7th Canadian Screen Awards	Studio K	Lisa Wisniewski	
2019; 8th Canadian Screen Awards
2019; 8th Canadian Screen Awards	PAW Patrol	Jennifer Dodge, Ronnen Harary, Keith Chapman, Ursula Ziegler-Sullivan, Laura Clunie, Toni Stevens, Jonah Stroh, Matt Beatty, David Sharples, Damian Temporale, Sarah Williams	
2019; 8th Canadian Screen Awards	Abby Hatcher	Rob Hoegee, Jennifer Dodge, Ronnen Harary, Laura Clunie, Jamie Whitney, Frank Falcone, Mary Bredin, Toni Stevens, Jonah Stroh, Tracey Dodokin, Cynthia Taylor	
2019; 8th Canadian Screen Awards	Dino Dana	J. J. Johnson, Blair Powers, Christin Simms, Matthew J.R. Bishop	
2019; 8th Canadian Screen Awards	Rusty Rivets	Jennifer Dodge, Ronnen Harary, Laura Clunie, Toni Stevens, Jonah Stroh, Jaelyn Galbraith, Jane Sobol	
2019; 8th Canadian Screen Awards	True and the Rainbow Kingdom	Frank Falcone, Mary Bredin, Jeremy Larner, Bill Schultz, Mimi Valdés, Pharrell Williams, Dominique Bazay	

=== 2020s ===
Year	Show	Producers	Ref
2020; 9th Canadian Screen Awards
2020; 9th Canadian Screen Awards	PAW Patrol	Jennifer Dodge, Ronnen Harary, Keith Chapman, Ursula Ziegler-Sullivan, Laura Clunie, Toni Stevens, Jonah Stroh, Dan Mokriy, Shayna Fine, Jason McKenzie, Pascale LeBlanc, David Sharples, Damian Temporale, Sarah Williams	
2020; 9th Canadian Screen Awards	Abby Hatcher	Jennifer Dodge, Ronnen Harary, Rob Hoegee, Jamie Whitney, Laura Clunie, Frank Falcone, Toni Stevens, Jonah Stroh, Dan Mokriy, Cynthia Taylor, David Watson	
2020; 9th Canadian Screen Awards	Dino Dana	J.J. Johnson, Blair Powers, Christin Simms, Matthew J.R. Bishop	
2020; 9th Canadian Screen Awards	Esme & Roy	Pam Westman, Amy Steinberg, Dustin Ferrer, Scott Dyer, Kay Wilson Stallings, Doug Murphy, Jane Crawford, Melanie Grisanti, Oliver Kane, Pamela Slavin, Melissa Graham, Rick Ritter	
2020; 9th Canadian Screen Awards	True and the Rainbow Kingdom	Frank Falcone, Mary Bredin, Jeremy Larner, Bill Schultz, Mimi Valdés, Pharrell Williams, Dominique Bazay	
2021; 10th Canadian Screen Awards
2021; 10th Canadian Screen Awards	PAW Patrol	Jennifer Dodge, Ronnen Harary, Keith Chapman, Ursula Ziegler-Sullivan, Laura Clunie, Toni Stevens, Jonah Stroh, Dan Mokriy, Shayna Fine, Pascale LeBlanc, Jason McKenzie, David Sharples, Damian Temporale	
2021; 10th Canadian Screen Awards	Dino Ranch	Matthew Fernandes, Jon Rutherford, Ivan Schneeberg, David Fortier, Tammy Semen, Arthur Spanos, Bob Higgins, Anna Keenan	
2021; 10th Canadian Screen Awards	Happy House of Frightenstein	Michelle Melanson, Ken Cuperus, Sandy Jobin-Bevans, Mitchell Markowitz	
2021; 10th Canadian Screen Awards	Miss Persona	Kimberly Persona	
2021; 10th Canadian Screen Awards	Pikwik Pack	Frank Falcone, Rachel Reade Marcus, Kirsten Newlands	
2022; 11th Canadian Screen Awards
2022; 11th Canadian Screen Awards	PAW Patrol	Jennifer Dodge, Ronnen Harary, Keith Chapman, Ursula Ziegler-Sullivan, Laura Clunie, Toni Stevens, Jonah Stroh, Dan Mokriy, Tracey Dodokin, Jason McKenzie, Damian Temporale	
2022; 11th Canadian Screen Awards	The Fabulous Show with Fay and Fluffy	Rennata Lopez, Georgina Lopez	
2022; 11th Canadian Screen Awards	Happy House of Frightenstein	Michelle Melanson, Ken Cuperus, Sandy Jobin-Bevans, Mitchell Markowitz	
2022; 11th Canadian Screen Awards	Pikwik Pack	Frank Falcone, Rachel Reade Marcus, Kirsten Newlands	
2022; 11th Canadian Screen Awards	The Studio K Show: "Proud to Be Me!"	Lisa Wisniewski, Emily Houghton, Julie Patterson-Porter, Julia Okoth	
2023; 12th Canadian Screen Awards
2023; 12th Canadian Screen Awards	PAW Patrol	Jennifer Dodge, Ronnen Harary, Keith Chapman, Ursula Ziegler-Sullivan, Laura Clunie, Toni Stevens, Jonah Stroh, Dan Mokriy, David Watson, Matt Beatty, Jason McKenzie, Damian Temporale	
2023; 12th Canadian Screen Awards	Aunty B's House	Michelle Melanson, Ken Cuperus, Kara Harun, Khalilah Brooks	
2023; 12th Canadian Screen Awards	Builder Brothers Dream Factory	Carla de Jong, Amory Millard, Drew Scott, Jonathan Scott, Josie Crimi, Matthew J.R. Bishop, Blair Powers, J.J. Johnson, Scott Kraft, Megan Laughton	
2023; 12th Canadian Screen Awards	Daniel Tiger's Neighbourhood	Angela C. Santomero, Vince Commisso, Ellen Doherty, Nora Keely, Blake Tohana, Natalie Osborne, Alexandra Cassel Schwartz, Christopher Loggins, Martin Sal, Ilene Louise Mitchell, Haley Hoffman	
2023; 12th Canadian Screen Awards	Dino Ranch	Ivan Schneeberg, David Fortier, Matthew Fernandes, Jon Rutherford, Arthur Spanos, Tammy Semen, Bob Higgins, Anna Keenan, Genna du Plessis, Audrey Velichka	
2024; 13th Canadian Screen Awards
2024; 13th Canadian Screen Awards	Paw Patrol	Jennifer Dodge, Ronnen Harary, Keith Chapman, Ursula Ziegler-Sullivan, Laura Clunie, Toni Stevens, Dan Mokriy, David Watson, Matt Beatty, Jason McKenzie	
2024; 13th Canadian Screen Awards	Builder Brothers Dream Factory	Matthew J.R. Bishop, Josie Crimi, Carla de Jong, J.J. Johnson, Scott Kraft, Megan Laughton, Amory Millard, Blair Powers, Jonathan Scott, Drew Scott	
2024; 13th Canadian Screen Awards	CBC Kids Celebrates the Olympic Games	Lisa Wisniewski, Andrew Hicks, Gagan Sagoo, Carly Watt, Emily Houghton	
2024; 13th Canadian Screen Awards	The Fabulous Show with Fay and Fluffy	Rennata Lopez, Georgina Lopez, Chloe Gray	
2024; 13th Canadian Screen Awards	Wordsville	Matthew J.R. Bishop, J.J. Johnson, Blair Powers, Christin Simms, Stephen J. Turnbull, Kirsten Hurd, Jill Peters, Sandra Sheppard	
