= Canadian Screen Award for Best Host in a Children's or Youth Program or Series =

Discontinued annual Canadian media award

The Canadian Screen Award for Best Host in a Children's or Youth Program or Series was a Canadian television award that honored performances for non-fiction children's television in English language produced in Canada. Both adult performers and child actors were eligible for the awards.

From 2008 to 2011, it was presented by the Gemini Awards. The Canadian Screen Awards hosted from 2011 to 2016. After this year, the awards were discontinued.

== Winners and nominees ==
Winners in bold.

=== 2000s ===
==== 2008 ====
- **Bob McDonald** - Heads Up! ("What Will Cars Look Like in the Future?")
- Joe MacLeod - Ghost Trackers ("Terror in the Tunnel: Castle Loma Coach House")
- Patty Sullivan - Kids' Canada: I Care
- André Simoneau - Prank Patrol ("Principal's Office")
- Mark Sykes - Mark's Moments ("Max")

==== 2009 ====
- **Araya Mengesha** - Mystery Hunters ("Mysterious Legends: Ark of the Covenant")
- T.J. Samuel and Tristan Samuel - Are We There Yet?: World Adventure ("New Zealand – Maori")
- Sabrina Jalees - In Real Life ("Hollywood Stunt Performers")
- Patty Sullivan - Kids' Canada
- Mark Sykes - Mark's Moments ("Sydney")

=== 2010s ===
==== 2010 ====
- **Patty Sullivan** - Kids' Canada ("Patty Sullivan")
- Evan Solomon - Canada's Super Speller ("1X04")
- Adamo Ruggiero - The Next Star ("Edmonton/Vancouver")
- Mark Sykes - Mark's Moments ("Alexandre Baronette")

==== 2011 ====
- **Jeremie Saunders** - Artzooka! ("Episode 111")
- Adamo Ruggiero - The Next Star ("Decades")
- Gisèle Corinthios - Gisèle's Big Backyard ("Big Backyard Community")

==== 2012 ====
- **Jeremie Saunders** - Artzooka! ("Episode 218")
- Adam Christie - Zoink'd! ("To Be Zany or To Be Zoink'd")
- Gisèle Corinthios - Gisèle's Big Backyard ("Movie Moments - Long 1")
- Michael Lagimodiere - Giver ("Guelph - Circus Park")
- Adamo Ruggiero - The Next Star ("Auditions 1")

==== 2013 ====
- **Carlos Bustamante** - The Next Star ("Auditions Part 3")
- Andrew Chapman - Extreme Babysitting
- Bradford How - The Grizzly Cup ("Part 1")

==== 2014 ====
- **Yannick Bisson** - The Adventures of Napkin Man ("Just Me in a Tree")
- Carlos Bustamante - The Next Star ("Live Finale")
- Kara Harun - TVOKids: The Space ("Princess P Pie Day")
- Lisa Gilroy - Undercover High ("He Toots He Scores and No Plane No Gain")

==== 2015 ====
- **Harrison Houde** - Finding Stuff Out ("Poop")
- Michael Lagimodiere - Giver ("Amherstburg: Sports Park")
- Kara Harun - TVOKids: The Space ("Animal Day")
