= Toopy and Binoo: Fabulous Adventures =

Canadian animated children's television series

- Genre: Fantasy; Comedy; Education
- Created by: Dominique Jolin
- Based on: Toupie et Binou by Dominique Jolin
- Story by: Dominique Jolin
- Directed by: Raymond Lebrun; Marcos da Silva (season 1)
- Starring: Marc Labrèche (French); Frank Meschkuleit (English)
- Voices of: Frank Meschkuleit
- Music by: Daniel Scott
- Opening theme: "Toopy and Binoo Theme Song"
- Ending theme: "Toopy and Binoo Theme Song" (instrumental)
- Country of origin: Canada
- Original languages: French; English
- No. of seasons: 1
- No. of episodes: 39

Production
- Executive producers: André A. Belanger; Luc Châtelain
- Producer: Dominique Mendel
- Running time: 7 minutes
- Production companies: Echo Média; Huminah Huminah Animation

Original release
- Network: CBC Kids; Télévision de Radio-Canada; Toon-A-Vision
- Release: October 25, 2025 – present

Toopy and Binoo: Fabulous Adventures (French: Toupie et Binou: Les fabuleuse adventures) is a Canadian children's book series created by Dominique Jolin in 1996. In collaboration with Raymond Lebrun, it has been developed as an Toon Boom animated series produced by Echo Média (formerly Spectra Animation) and broadcast by CBC Kids in English and Télévision de Radio-Canada and Toon-A-Vision in French. It is a follow up to the original Toopy and Binoo series that ran from 2005-2006.

The series was first announced on November 14, 2024 before being released on CBC Kids on October 25, 2025, followed by Ici Radio-Canada Télé, TFO, and Toon-A-Vision on April 10, 2026. Echo Média and KO Distribution distributes the series and Huminah Huminah Animation produces and animates the series.

== Plot ==
Toopy is a funny, friendly, optimistic, impulsive mouse whose passion for life is matched only by his love for his best friend, Binoo, a cat who is logical, sensible, and thinks before he acts. The kindness, respect, and gentle aspects of childhood friendship are exemplified as the friends explore and discover the world around them with their adventures.

== History ==
Toupie et Binou was the original title of the children's book series written by Dominique Jolin, who also wrote a spinoff solely featuring Binoo.

Echo Media (formerly Spectra Animation) then brought them to television, both in English versions, dubbing their English names to Toopy and Binoo.

Seasons 1 and 2 have been broadcast in over 179 countries and dubbed into 30 languages, 1 million DVD's have been sold and YouTube videos have reached nearly 350 million views, for a total of 1.35 billion minutes viewed.

A spinoff of the television series, entiltled Toopy and Binoo Vroom Vroom Zoom, used the art form of puppetry instead of animation. Two Toopy and Binoo live shows, Marshmallow Moon and Fun and Games were presented across Canada and sold over 250,000 tickets.

In the United States, Toopy and Binoo had featured games on the PBS Kids online school readiness program PBS Kids Play!

== Characters ==
- Toopy (voiced by Marc Labrèche in the French version and Frank Meschkuleit in the English version) is a funny, friendly, optimistic, impulsive mouse whose insatiable zest for life is matched only by his love for his best friend, Binoo. He has a wide imagination and takes Binoo to imaginary places created by the both of them and loves many different things, such as going on adventures with Binoo. Toopy is shown to really enjoy life in the show, and has a laugh line used in the credits, and some of the episodes. Toopy is the only one to have a voice actor, who also voices every character in Dragon.
- Binoo is a small white cat who does not speak. He is a lovable cat who is logical, sensible, and thinks before he acts. Binoo is devoted to his best friend Toopy. He communicates with signs and he also has a stuffed toy called "Patchy-Patch". He also enjoys reading books and going on adventures.
- Coco (voiced by Ravyn R. Bekh) is a female squirrel.
- Ed (voiced by Daniel Brochu) is a male elephant.
- Emmy (voiced by Angela Galuppo) is a female dragon.

== Episodes ==
Season	Episodes	Originally released	
Season	Episodes	First released	Last released
1	39	October 25, 2025	TBA

== Season 1 (2025) ==
No. overall	No. in season	Title	Story by	Original release date	Prod. code
1	1	"Binoo's Quiet Time"	Katherine Sandford	October 25, 2025	101A
2	2	"Too Much Pasta!"	Angela Goulene	October 25, 2025	102A
3	3	"Adventures in Binooland"	Katherine Sandford	October 25, 2025	101B
