= Toopy and Binoo =

Canadian animated children's television series

- Toopy (right) and Binoo (left) playing with bubbles
- Genre: Fantasy; Comedy; Education
- Created by: Dominique Jolin
- Based on: Toupie et Binou by Dominique Jolin
- Written by: Nancy Trites-Botkin; Claude Daigneault; Sheila Dinsmore; Clive Endersby; Dominique Jolin; Jean Lacombe; Brian Lasenby; Raymond Lebrun; Penelope Laurence; Gerard Lewis; Mary Mackay-Smith; Tom Mason; Cathy Moss; Louis-Martin Pepperall; Anne-Marie Perrotta; Katherine Sandford; Tean Schultz; Peter Svatek; Jeff Sweeney; Steven Westren
- Story by: Dominique Jolin
- Directed by: Raymond Lebrun; Marcos da Silva (season 1)
- Starring: Marc Labrèche (French); Frank Meschkuleit (English)
- Voices of: Frank Meschkuleit; Voice casts (Mini-movies)
- Music by: Daniel Scott
- Opening theme: "Toopy and Binoo Theme Song"
- Ending theme: "Toopy and Binoo Theme Song" (backing vocals) (Season 1); "Toopy and Binoo Theme Song" (instrumental) (The Hiccup Hunters and Binoo the Brave)
- Country of origin: Canada
- Original languages: French; English
- No. of seasons: 2
- No. of episodes: 32 (104 segments)

Production
- Executive producers: André A. Belanger; Luc Châtelain
- Producer: Dominique Mendel
- Editors: France Dube; Marie-Hélène Boulianne; Mathieu Boulanger (Mini-movies)
- Running time: 24 minutes (5 minutes per segment); 22 minutes (mini-movies)
- Production company: Spectra Animation

Original release
- Network: Treehouse TV; Télévision de Radio-Canada; Télé-Québec
- Release: January 3, 2005 – December 29, 2006

Toopy and Binoo (French: Toupie et Binou) is a Canadian children's book series created by Dominique Jolin in 1996. In collaboration with Raymond Lebrun, it has been developed as an After Effect animated series produced by Echo Média (formerly Spectra Animation) and broadcast by Treehouse in English and Télévision de Radio-Canada and Télé-Québec in French.

A total of 175 episodes were produced overall. In 2013, a live-action spin-off show titled Toopy and Binoo Vroom Vroom Zoom was released on Treehouse TV and aired until 2017.

A film adaptation based on the series titled Toopy and Binoo: The Movie was released on August 11, 2023 in Canadian theaters.

On November 14, 2024, it was announced that Toopy and Binoo would return in a brand new series called Toopy and Binoo: Fabulous Adventures. It was released on CBC Kids on October 25, 2025, followed by Ici Radio-Canada Télé, TFO, and Toon-A-Vision on April 10, 2026. Echo Média and KO Distribution distributes the series and Huminah Huminah Animation produces and animates the series.

== Plot ==
Toopy is a funny, friendly, optimistic, impulsive mouse whose insatiable zest for life is matched only by his love for his best friend, Binoo, a cat who is logical, sensible, and thinks before he acts. Binoo is devoted to his best friend Toopy. The characters are charming and endearing. The kindness, respect, and gentle aspects of childhood friendship are emphasized as the friends explore and discover the world around them with their colorful adventures. Toopy and Binoo allows for learning in a non-didactic manner. Individual segments are approximately five minutes in length, but five of them are frequently paired together into one 24-minute episode, both on television and DVD releases.

There are also short 2-minute episodes that are seen on the website in the second season, where, there are either "Magic You", "Captain You", or "Fabulous You" segments, featuring Toopy and Binoo as space captains, fairies, or, as superheroes who make things right by using magic (Toopy sometimes ends it by doing the same thing that's wrong on himself which he doesn't even notice), and they use the magic wand from "Godmother Toopy", explore things in their house and pretend to find out what they are, and, Binoo sometimes reveals what they are, such as a pillow, where, they use the same uniforms they had in "Strange New World", but, instead, the object they find is the entire form of the planet, and, help their friends when they have nothing to play with by playing games they can use with themselves. They use the same uniforms they had in "Super Toopy", however, Binoo does strikingly resemble Super Toopy. The segments encourage viewers (referred to in the show as "Magic You", "Captain You", or, "Fabulous You") to participate in the adventures and use their imaginations. Each DVD that has two half-hour specials has two of each of these three short mini-episode adventures, starting in this order: "Magic You", "Captain You", and then, "Fabulous You".

== History ==
Toupie et Binou was the original title of the children's book series written by Dominique Jolin, who also wrote a spinoff solely featuring Binoo.

Echo Media (formerly Spectra Animation) then brought them to television, both in English versions, dubbing their English names to Toopy and Binoo.

Seasons 1 and 2 have been broadcast in over 179 countries and dubbed into 30 languages, 1 million DVD's have been sold and YouTube videos have reached nearly 350 million views, for a total of 1.35 billion minutes viewed.

A spinoff of the television series, entiltled Toopy and Binoo Vroom Vroom Zoom, used the art form of puppetry instead of animation. Two Toopy and Binoo live shows, Marshmallow Moon and Fun and Games were presented across Canada and sold over 250,000 tickets.

In the United States, Toopy and Binoo had featured games on the PBS Kids online school readiness program PBS Kids Play!

== Characters ==
- Toopy (voiced by Marc Labrèche in the French version and Frank Meschkuleit in the English version) is a funny, friendly, optimistic, impulsive mouse whose insatiable zest for life is matched only by his love for his best friend, Binoo. He has a wide imagination and takes Binoo to imaginary places created by the both of them and loves many different things, such as going on adventures with Binoo. Toopy is shown to really enjoy life in the show, and has a laugh line used in the credits, and some of the episodes. Toopy is the only one to have a voice actor, who also voices every character in Dragon.
- Binoo is a small white cat who does not speak. He is a lovable cat who is logical, sensible, and thinks before he acts. Binoo is devoted to his best friend Toopy. He communicates with signs and he also has a stuffed toy called "Patchy-Patch". He also enjoys reading books and going on adventures.

== Episodes ==
=== Series overview ===
Season	Segments	Episodes	Originally released	
Season	Segments	Episodes	First released	Last released
1	104	26	January 3, 2005	June 20, 2005
2	N/A	6	February 14, 2006	December 29, 2006

=== Season 1 (2005) ===
- In bubble transitions of each episode, there are scenarios of Toopy and Binoo playing with bubbles.

No. overall	No. in season	Title	Story by	Original release date	Prod. code
1	1	"Tiger Binoo"	Katherine Sandford	January 3, 2005	101A / 113C
1	1	"The Flying Hat"	Katherine Sandford	January 3, 2005	101B / 111D
1	1	"Giant Footprints"	Clive Endersby	January 3, 2005	101C
1	1	"Power Pyjamas"	Katherine Sandford	January 3, 2005	101D / 113E
1	1	"Sock Safari"	Katherine Sandford	January 3, 2005	101E
Toopy is going on a tiger hunt and Binoo is the tiger. Toopy chases the tiger up into the mountains, through the grasslands and into a cave, but it's Binoo who gets the last laugh and traps Toopy. Toopy hunts for butterflies while Binoo catches his own with the help of a magic net. When their muddy footprints come to life, Toopy and Binoo chase a sneaky creature called a Geraffikiki around the room and up onto the ceiling. Binoo doesn't want to wear his new jammies until Toopy convinces him they have super powers - and they do! Toopy and Binoo follow Binoo's lost sock into the drawer and discover a laundry jungle.
2	2	"The Castle"	Anne-Marie Perrotta and Tean Schultz	January 10, 2005	102A / 126E
2	2	"Ballooning with Binoo"	Steven Westren	January 10, 2005	102B
2	2	"Soapy Toopy"	Katherine Sandford	January 10, 2005	102C / 109C
2	2	"Topsy Turvey"	Steven Westren	January 10, 2005	102D / 125B
2	2	"Dusteroos"	Anne-Marie Perrotta and Tean Schultz	January 10, 2005	102E
Toopy is trapped in a block tower and Binoo has to pile up sheep to get him out. Binoo blows a giant gum bubble and takes off with Toopy stuck to his feet. At bath time, Toopy and Binoo have an underwater adventure in search of the soap. It's hot and to get cool Toopy and Binoo stick frozen pops to their feet and skate to the arctic. While looking for Binoo's lost car, our heroes discover an outback world beneath the couch inhabited by kamikaze dust balls.
3	3	"Toopy's Story"	Anne-Marie Perrotta and Tean Schultz	January 17, 2005	103A / 113B
3	3	"Invisible World"	Clive Endersby	January 17, 2005	103B
3	3	"Night Light"	Gerard Lewis	January 17, 2005	103C
3	3	"Peanut-Butterbot"	Gerard Lewis	January 17, 2005	103D
3	3	"Tickle-Me-Tail"	Clive Endersby	January 17, 2005	103E
Toopy is telling Binoo a bedtime story but the last page is missing. Toopy and Binoo go into the story to find the ending with the help of a friendly dragon. A game of peek-a-boo takes a surprising twist when the entire house disappears. In search of the perfect night light, Toopy and Binoo chase a falling star through the nighttime sky. Toopy builds a robot to make peanut butter sandwiches for himself and Binoo. Toopy is trying to get Binoo to laugh and finally succeeds by tickling him with a feather.
4	4	"The Big Race"	Brian Lasenby	January 24, 2005	104A / 110B
4	4	"Little Red Binoo"	Katherine Sandford	January 24, 2005	104B / 110C
4	4	"Strange New World"	Clive Endersby	January 24, 2005	104C
4	4	"Where's Patchy-Patch?"	Gerard Lewis	January 24, 2005	104D
4	4	"Sneezing Toopy"	Anne-Marie Perrotta and Tean Schultz	January 24, 2005	104E
Toopy and Binoo are having a race, and while Toopy has all kinds of vehicles, Binoo sticks with his tricycle. Toopy is writing a story and Binoo is the star! Toopy and Binoo are scouring the galaxy for new friends, and they find one in an unexpected place. Binoo loses Patchy-Patch and he and Toopy go to look for him under the covers. Toopy has the sniffles and Binoo takes care of him, but it's not so easy to keep Toopy comfy.
5	5	"Camp Out"	Gerard Lewis	January 31, 2005	105A / 122E
5	5	"Binoo's Letter"	Sheila Dinsmore	January 31, 2005	105B / 122D
5	5	"Pet Palace"	Jeff Sweeney	January 31, 2005	105C
5	5	"Colour Me Toopy!"	Katherine Sandford	January 31, 2005	105D
5	5	"Meatball Western"	Anne-Marie Perrotta and Tean Schultz	January 31, 2005	105E
Toopy and Binoo are camping indoors in a blanket tent, but Binoo's nervousness sends them out into the nighttime forest in search of a night light. Binoo mails a letter that goes all over the world (with Toopy and Binoo aboard) before it reaches the person it was meant for Toopy, of course! Toopy's pet store is full of fabulous imaginary animals, but none are as good a friend for Binoo as Patchy-Patch. Toopy and Binoo brighten up a rainy day by painting a sunny day at the beach with finger paints. Toopy and Binoo follow Binoo's lost meatball under the table where they have a Western adventure getting it back.
6	6	"Toopy Knows Everything"	Clive Endersby	February 7, 2005	106A / 124C
6	6	"Diaper Dream"	Anne-Marie Perrotta and Tean Schultz	February 7, 2005	106B
6	6	"Jack-in-the-Box"	Gerard Lewis	February 7, 2005	106C
6	6	"Backpack"	Anne-Marie Perrotta and Tean Schultz	February 7, 2005	106D
6	6	"The Amazing Maze"	Clive Endersby	February 7, 2005	106E
The Great Toopy predicts everything that will happen on Binoo's breakfast adventure, except the fact they'll run out of cereal. The monster in Binoo's dream turns out to be a crying female baby who needs a new diaper. Toopy and Binoo chase an escaping Jack-in-the-box into his box. Toopy and Binoo play hide-and-seek in a backpack where they meet a new friend called Patchy-Patch. Toopy and Binoo get lost in the maze Toopy is doing, but a baby kangaroo helps them escape.
7	7	"Four Seasons"	Katherine Sandford	February 14, 2005	107A
7	7	"Gone Fishin'"	Katherine Sandford	February 14, 2005	107B / 124A
7	7	"Train Ride"	Katherine Sandford	February 14, 2005	107C / 113A
7	7	"Godmother Toopy"	Katherine Sandford	February 14, 2005	107D / 112E
7	7	"Binoo Blows Raspberries"	Anne-Marie Perrotta and Tean Schultz	February 14, 2005	107E / 112D
Toopy and Binoo slide their toboggan down the biggest hill ever! Toopy and Binoo go fishing off the sofa and catch some surprises. Toopy and Binoo go on a long trip to find an apple that is right beside their front door. Toopy gets Binoo ready for the ball, and gets a nice surprise himself. Toopy teaches Binoo the best way to deal with scary monsters.
8	8	"Eggheads"	Nancy Trites-Botkin	February 21, 2005	108A / 111B
8	8	"Bistro Binoo"	Jeff Sweeney	February 21, 2005	108B / 125E
8	8	"Magic Mirror"	Katherine Sandford	February 21, 2005	108C / 113D
8	8	"Abracadabra"	Clive Endersby	February 21, 2005	108D
8	8	"Toopy's Bed"	Katherine Sandford	February 21, 2005	108E
Toopy and Binoo find themselves in a nest and discover what it's like to be birds. Toopy feeds Binoo a feast of invisible food and Binoo blows up like a balloon. Toopy falls into a mirror, meets a bunch of other Toopys, and discovers why he's the best Toopy of all. Toopy's magic tricks go awry. Toopy can't get comfortable, so he takes Binoo on a fantastical search for a new bed.
9	9	"Gopherville"	Nancy Trites-Botkin	February 28, 2005	109A / 123E
9	9	"Toopy's Nose"	Story by : Dominique Jolin; Script : Katherine Sandford	February 28, 2005	109B / 123B
9	9	"Soapy Toopy"	Katherine Sandford	February 28, 2005	102C / 109C
9	9	"The Genie"	Jeff Sweeney	February 28, 2005	109D
9	9	"Big Smooch!"	Story by : Dominique Jolin; Script : Katherine Sandford	February 28, 2005	109E
Binoo plays hide and seek in gopher holes as Toopy searches. Toopy and Binoo go into a board game in search of Toopy's lost nose. At bath time, Toopy and Binoo have an underwater adventure in search of the soap. Toopy becomes a genie and grants three wishes to Binoo. Toopy wants to kiss a frog to see if it will turn into a prince, but the frog has other ideas. Meanwhile, Binoo has better luck.
10	10	"Song and Dance"	Clive Endersby	March 7, 2005	110A / 126A
10	10	"The Big Race"	Brian Lasenby	March 7, 2005	104A / 110B
10	10	"Little Red Binoo"	Katherine Sandford	March 7, 2005	104B / 110C
10	10	"Duckling"	Katherine Sandford	March 7, 2005	110D / 116E
10	10	"The Seven Binoos"	Anne-Marie Perrotta and Tean Schultz	March 7, 2005	110E / 114E
Toopy has planned a musical with Patchy-Patch's help, lucky too, as Patchy-Patch saves the day every time until Binoo saves Patchy-Patch. Toopy and Binoo are having a race, and while Toopy has all kinds of vehicles, Binoo sticks with his tricycle. Toopy is writing a story and Binoo is the star! Toopy wants to become every creature he sees, and he and Binoo does! Toopy made six Binoos out of snow who come to life.
11	11	"Funny Bunny"	Gerard Lewis	March 14, 2005	111A
11	11	"Eggheads"	Nancy Trites-Botkin	March 14, 2005	108A / 111B
11	11	"Mud Cake"	Anne-Marie Perrotta and Tean Schultz	March 14, 2005	111C
11	11	"The Flying Hat"	Katherine Sandford	March 14, 2005	101B / 111D
11	11	"Storm in a Bottle"	Gerard Lewis	March 14, 2005	111E / 119E
Bunny Toopy hunts for the perfect place to hide Binoo's egg. Toopy and Binoo find themselves in a nest and discover what it's like to be birds. Toopy and Binoo go into a mud cake to find their lost marbles. Toopy hunts for butterflies while Binoo catches his own with the help of a magic net. Binoo catches a storm cloud in a bottle and brings it into the house.
12	12	"Pumpkin Party"	Clive Endersby	March 21, 2005	112A
12	12	"Grunt Monster"	Clive Endersby	March 21, 2005	112B
12	12	"Happy Toopy Day!"	Cathy Moss	March 21, 2005	112C
12	12	"Binoo Blows Raspberries"	Anne-Marie Perrotta and Tean Schultz	March 21, 2005	107E / 112D
12	12	"Godmother Toopy"	Katherine Sandford	March 21, 2005	107D / 112E
Toopy and Binoo want to go to a party inside a pumpkin! But first they have to find the right costume. When a mysterious and cute little monster shows up, Toopy and Binoo have to find out where he belongs. Toopy tries to teach Binoo to trick-or-treat, but each time they get to a door, it's the wrong holiday. Toopy teaches Binoo the best way to deal with scary monsters. Toopy gets Binoo ready for the ball, and gets a nice surprise himself.
13	13	"Train Ride"	Katherine Sandford	March 21, 2005	107C / 113A
13	13	"Toopy's Story"	Anne-Marie Perrotta and Tean Schultz	March 21, 2005	103A / 113B
13	13	"Tiger Binoo"	Katherine Sandford	March 21, 2005	101A / 113C
13	13	"Magic Mirror"	Katherine Sandford	March 21, 2005	108C / 113D
13	13	"Power Pyjamas"	Katherine Sandford	March 21, 2005	101D / 113E
Toopy and Binoo go on a long trip to find an apple that is right beside their front door. Toopy is telling Binoo a bedtime story but the last page is missing. Toopy and Binoo go into the story to find the ending with the help of a friendly dragon. Toopy is going on a tiger hunt and Binoo is the tiger. Toopy chases the tiger up into the mountains, through the grasslands and into a cave, but it's Binoo who gets the last laugh and traps Toopy. Toopy falls into a mirror, meets a bunch of other Toopys, and discovers why he's the best Toopy of all. Binoo doesn't want to wear his new jammies until Toopy convinces him they have super powers - and they do!
14	14	"Christmas Eve"	Katherine Sandford	March 28, 2005	114A
14	14	"Santa Toopy"	Gerard Lewis	March 28, 2005	114B
14	14	"Snowflakes"	Katherine Sandford	March 28, 2005	114C
14	14	"Toopy's Present"	Katherine Sandford	March 28, 2005	114D
14	14	"The Seven Binoos"	Anne-Marie Perrotta and Tean Schultz	March 28, 2005	110E / 114E
Toopy and Binoo are preparing Christmas Eve when Toopy realizes that he forgot to invite the guests. Santa Toopy and Santa Binoo give special presents to everything in the house. Toopy and Binoo's plans to feed their snowman lead to a multi-coloured snowflake feast. Toopy makes Christmas in July to give Binoo a special present. Toopy made six Binoos out of snow who come to life.
15	15	"Jungle Toopy"	Jeff Sweeney	April 4, 2005	115A
15	15	"Play Clay"	Anne-Marie Perrotta and Tean Schultz	April 4, 2005	115B
15	15	"Robot Doctors"	Jeff Sweeney	April 4, 2005	115C
15	15	"Big Parade"	Jeff Sweeney	April 4, 2005	115D
15	15	"On and Off"	Clive Endersby	April 4, 2005	115E
Toopy is keeping the jungle safe for Binoo over and over again. Toopy and Binoo have a great time making big creatures out of play clay. Binoo has a boo-boo so Toopy tries to cheer him up with a new toy robot. But when the robot won't work, Toopy and Binoo have to heal it. Toopy and Binoo have a parade that leaves their messy playroom even messier. Toopy and Binoo play a hiding game until Binoo turns the tables on Toopy.
16	16	"Puppet Show"	Katherine Sandford	April 11, 2005	116A
16	16	"Space House"	Katherine Sandford	April 11, 2005	116B
16	16	"Bubbles"	Clive Endersby	April 11, 2005	116C
16	16	"Toopy Goes Bananas"	Steven Westren	April 11, 2005	116D
16	16	"Duckling"	Katherine Sandford	April 11, 2005	110D / 116E
Toopy just can't help improving Binoo's puppet show. Toopy and Binoo search for the perfect planet. Toopy is looking for Binoo in the land of bubbles. Binoo wants a banana, but Toopy's eaten the last one. No problem, he knows exactly where he can find another! Toopy wants to become every creature he sees, and he and Binoo does!
17	17	"Sparkle Binoo"	Katherine Sandford	April 18, 2005	117A
17	17	"Toopy's Surprise"	Jeff Sweeney	April 18, 2005	117B
17	17	"Sky Friends"	Jeff Sweeney	April 18, 2005	117C
17	17	"Binoo's Birthday"	Katherine Sandford	April 18, 2005	117D
17	17	"Binoo's Island"	Gerard Lewis	April 18, 2005	117E
The glitter from the Valentine's card that Toopy made for Binoo turns him into a fairy and Binoo makes a truly spectacular Valentine for Toopy. Binoo is too busy to play with Toopy because he's making him a surprise. Toopy and Binoo see a cloud shaped just like Toopy, but where is the Binoo cloud? Sir Toopy takes Sir Binoo to search for a magic leaf. Meanwhile the toys are planning a surprise party for Binoo's birthday. Binoo is reading to Patchy-Patch on an island and Toopy tries to get his attention.
18	18	"Sock Puppet"	Anne-Marie Perrotta and Tean Schultz	April 25, 2005	118A
18	18	"Magic Marker"	Katherine Sandford	April 25, 2005	118B
18	18	"Rockin' Toopy!"	Anne-Marie Perrotta and Tean Schultz	April 25, 2005	118C / 119B
18	18	"Cinder-Binoo"	Gerard Lewis	April 25, 2005	118D
18	18	"Cloud Gazing"	Katherine Sandford	April 25, 2005	118E
Toopy's sock puppet has a life of its own. Toopy is drawing Binoo's portrait, but a mustache (and other things) come to life. When Binoo picks out a rhythm on his toy piano, Toopy and his friends join in. Toopy has made dresses for himself and Binoo to go to the ball, now they just have to find the right shoes. While finding shapes in the clouds, Toopy and Binoo remember some of their adventures.
19	19	"Ant Mimi"	Gerard Lewis	May 2, 2005	119A
19	19	"Rockin' Toopy!"	Anne-Marie Perrotta and Tean Schultz	May 2, 2005	118C / 119B
19	19	"Snowglobe"	Katherine Sandford	May 2, 2005	119C
19	19	"The Great Goo-Goo"	Gerard Lewis	May 2, 2005	119D
19	19	"Storm in a Bottle"	Gerard Lewis	May 2, 2005	111E / 119E
Toopy and Binoo follows Toopy's pet ant into the land of dinosaurs. When Binoo picks out a rhythm on his toy piano, Toopy and his friends join in. Toopy and Binoo search for an underwater treasure in a snowglobe! Toopy and Binoo prepare tea for their special guest, The Great Goo-Goo. But will he ever come? Binoo catches a storm cloud in a bottle and brings it into the house.
20	20	"Recess"	Cathy Moss	May 9, 2005	120A
20	20	"Land of the Lost"	Gerard Lewis	May 9, 2005	120B
20	20	"Superball"	Cathy Moss	May 9, 2005	120C
20	20	"Keyhole"	Jeff Sweeney	May 9, 2005	120D
20	20	"Invisible Dog"	Jean Lacombe	May 9, 2005	120E
Toopy and Binoo go to school, Toopy-style! Binoo loses his reading glasses and he and Toopy go inside the sofa cushions where they find everything, but the glasses. Toopy follows his lost ball into Binoo's activity book. Toopy and Binoo find a key, but what does it open? Toopy finds an invisible dog and tries to show him some tricks.
21	21	"Treasure Hunt"	Story by : Claude Daigneault; Script : Dominique Jolin and Raymond LeBrun	May 16, 2005	121A
21	21	"The Big Blue"	Clive Endersby	May 16, 2005	121B
21	21	"Gargantua"	Katherine Sandford	May 16, 2005	121C
21	21	"Under the Bed"	Gerard Lewis	May 16, 2005	121D
21	21	"Magic Bowl"	Katherine Sandford	May 16, 2005	121E
Toopy and Binoo follow a dotted line to the most fabulous treasure ever. When Binoo draws a picture of what looks like a big blue bug, Toopy immediately takes off on a quest to find it, ignoring the fact that Binoo's picture is actually of an umbrella. A giant Binoo chases Toopy in a vegetable world after Binoo eats a magic pea. Toopy and Binoo are kept awake by a light shining out from under their bed! They discover a monster who can't sleep and must find out why. A magic bowl reminds Toopy some of the adventures he's had with Binoo.
22	22	"The Three Bears"	Story by : Dominique Jolin; Script : Katherine Sandford	May 23, 2005	122A
22	22	"Where's Binoo?"	Clive Endersby	May 23, 2005	122B
22	22	"The Lost Bear"	Jeff Sweeney	May 23, 2005	122C
22	22	"Binoo's Letter"	Sheila Dinsmore	May 23, 2005	105B / 122D
22	22	"Camp Out"	Gerard Lewis	May 23, 2005	105A / 122E
Toopy is playing a blindfold game where he has to guess what room he's in by feel. Little does he know he's actually in someone else's house. Toopy loses Binoo in a big pile of books. Toopy and Binoo follow Binoo's lost teddy bear through an amusement park until they finally win him back as a prize. Binoo mails a letter that goes all over the world (with Toopy and Binoo aboard) before it reaches the person it was meant for Toopy, of course! Toopy and Binoo are camping indoors in a blanket tent, but Binoo's nervousness sends them out into the nighttime forest in search of a night light.
23	23	"Toopy's Nose"	Story by : Dominique Jolin; Script : Katherine Sandford	May 30, 2005	109B / 123A
23	23	"Magic Whoosher"	Gerard Lewis	May 30, 2005	123B
23	23	"Worm Circus"	Katherine Sandford	May 30, 2005	123C
23	23	"Moon Bounce"	Katherine Sandford	May 30, 2005	123D
23	23	"Gopherville"	Nancy Trites-Botkin	May 30, 2005	109A / 123E
Toopy and Binoo go into a board game in search of Toopy's lost nose. Toopy accidentally spills cereal so he builds a Magic Whoosher to suck up the crumbs, but it also sucks up everything! Toopy and Binoo follow a worm into an apple and discover a secret world inside. Binoo's bouncing on the bed takes him and Toopy up to the moon where they meet a friendly race of bouncing moonmallows and settle them into bed. Binoo plays hide and seek in gopher holes as Toopy searches.
24	24	"Gone Fishin'"	Katherine Sandford	June 6, 2005	107B / 124A
24	24	"Super Toopy"	Katherine Sandford	June 6, 2005	124B
24	24	"Toopy Knows Everything"	Clive Endersby	June 6, 2005	106A / 124C
24	24	"Baby Toopy"	Anne-Marie Perrotta and Tean Schultz	June 6, 2005	124D
24	24	"Binoo's Wand"	Story by : Jeff Sweeney Based on the book "Abracadabra" by: Dominique Jolin	June 6, 2005	124E
Toopy and Binoo go fishing off the sofa and catch some surprises. Super Toopy and Super Binoo rescue all the toys in the toy box, and Patchy-Patch, too! The Great Toopy predicts everything that will happen on Binoo's breakfast adventure, except the fact they'll run out of cereal. Toopy becomes a little baby and Binoo must take care of him. Toopy can't wait to use the prize inside the cereal box, but while he's reading the instructions, Binoo has already found it.
25	25	"Water Wings"	Anne-Marie Perrotta and Tean Schultz	June 13, 2005	125A
25	25	"Topsy Turvey"	Steven Westren	June 13, 2005	102D / 125B
25	25	"Dreamland"	Jeff Sweeney	June 13, 2005	125C
25	25	"Treehouse"	Katherine Sandford	June 13, 2005	125D
25	25	"Bistro Binoo"	Jeff Sweeney	June 13, 2005	108B / 125E
Binoo can't play in the pool until Toopy blows up his water wing, but Toopy's puffs produce some strange transformations. It's hot and to get cool Toopy and Binoo stick frozen pops to their feet and skate to the arctic. Toopy goes into Binoo's dream to find out what is making him so happy. Toopy builds a treehouse, but Binoo keeps finding more and more treehouses higher and higher in the tree. Toopy feeds Binoo a feast of invisible food and Binoo blows up like a balloon.
26	26	"Song and Dance"	Clive Endersby	June 20, 2005	110A / 126A
26	26	"Little Bo Toopy"	Anne-Marie Perrotta and Tean Schultz	June 20, 2005	126B
26	26	"Cuckoo Clock"	Clive Endersby	June 20, 2005	126C
26	26	"The Land of Colours"	Katherine Sandford	June 20, 2005	126D
26	26	"The Castle"	Anne-Marie Perrotta and Tean Schultz	June 20, 2005	102A / 126E
Toopy has planned a musical with Patchy-Patch's help, lucky too, as Patchy-Patch saves the day every time until Binoo saves Patchy-Patch. When Toopy and Binoo lose the last piece of the puzzle they're working on (a sheep) they have to go into a puzzle world to find it. Toopy and Binoo go inside a clock in search of their lost cuckoo. Binoo only has one crayon. He and Toopy climb into the colouring book in search of more colours. Toopy is trapped in a block tower and Binoo has to pile up sheep to get him out.

=== Season 2 (2006) ===
No. overall	No. in season	Title	Story by	Original release date	Prod. code
27	1	"Binoo the Brave"	Dominique Jolin and Katherine Sandford	February 14, 2006	201
Binoo is afraid of an open closet door, so he and Toopy pretend that they are knights who have to rescue a dragon princess, who also meets other princesses. Meanwhile, two sheep want to see a wolf, which turns out to be an owl.
28	2	"The Hiccup Hunters"	Dominique Jolin and Louis-Martin Pepperall	March 23, 2006	202
Toopy tells a story about two amazing hiccup hunters when Binoo has the hiccups. But then, it's the pink sheep who saves the day.
29	3	"Binoo's Tall Tale"	Louis-Martin Pepperall	March 30, 2006	203
Binoo wants to be tall, so he goes to a faraway land where his wish comes true.
30	4	"Rock-A-Bye-Bear"	Story by : Dominique Jolin, Raymond LeBrun, and Katherine Sandford; Teleplay by : Dominique Jolin and Raymond LeBrun	June 23, 2006	204
Toopy and Binoo try multiple ways to get Mr. Bear to sleep when he accidentally wakes up, with the help of an owl and a bird, and if they don't, he'll keep crying until spring. But then Binoo realizes what kept him asleep: Patchy Patch!
31	5	"Toopy's Halloween"	Dominique Jolin and Louis-Martin Pepperall	October 17, 2006	205
After a talking mirror gives his opinion on Toopy's Halloween costume, Toopy tries to think of the best Halloween costume, along with some animals.
32	6	"Big Bad Christmas"	Dominique Jolin, Raymond LeBrun, and Katherine Sandford	December 29, 2006	206
Toopy and Binoo try to get Mr. Wolf to like Christmas, but nothing goes as planned... until the two give him a book about him as a child.
