= Meschkuleit =

Meschkuleit may refer to:

- Frank Meschkuleit (born 1962), Canadian voice actor and puppeteer
- Maya Meschkuleit (born 2001), Canadian rower
