= Studio K =

Studio K may refer to:

- Knott's Berry Farm attraction 1984–1991
- The Studio K Show in 2017 based on Studio K interstitials
