= Paul Sutherland =

Paul Sutherland may refer to:

- Paul Sutherland (TV producer) (1930–2004), Canadian television producer
- Paul Sutherland (politician) (born c. 1955), Canadian politician
- Paul Sutherland, ballet dancer that staged the ballet Rodeo
