= Mittens & Pants =

Canadian children's television series

Mittens & Pants is a Canadian children's television series, which premiered in 2022 on CBC Gem. The series centres on Mittens, a kitten, and Pants, a puppy, as they embark on various adventures with each other, and other animals, in their hometown of Kibble Corners. It soon debuted a British English dub using the same name on Sky UK's Sky Kids channel in February 2023.

Created by Phil McCordic for Windy Isle Entertainment, the series was inspired in part by his earlier shows Tumbletown Tales and Zerby Derby. It blends live-action footage of real animals with voice performances by child actors Mia SwamiNathan as Mittens, and Athan Giazitzidis as Pants. The show's voice cast also includes Lorne Cardinal as the narrator, Marium Carvell as Mittens' mom, Elena Juatco as Pants' mom, Dan Chameroy as Monsieur LaFleur, Patty Sullivan as Post Pig Petunia, and McCordic as Winkles. Samantha Weinstein also voiced Ms. McRooster in the first season, until her death in 2023. In the UK version, the voices are performed by child actors Darcie Smith as Mittens and Rafael Shbero as Pants. Included in the UK cast are Marcus Bentley as the narrator, Krupa Pattani as Mittens' Mum, George Eggay as Pants' Dad, Ossian Perret as Monsieur LaFleur, and Sue Elliot-Nicholas as Post Pig Petunia.

== Awards ==
Award / Film Festival	Date of ceremony	Category	Recipient(s)	Result	Ref.
Canadian Screen Awards	2024	Best Performance in an Animated Program or Series	Patty Sullivan	Nominated	
Canadian Screen Awards	2024	Best Original Song	Meiro Stamm, Antonio Naranjo "Mittens & Pants Theme"	Nominated	
Canadian Screen Awards	2024	Best Writing in a Preschool Program or Series	Katherine Sandford, "Bunny Family Wedding"	Nominated	
Canadian Screen Awards	2025	Best Voice Performance	Patty Sullivan	Nominated	
Canadian Screen Awards	2025	Best Voice Performance	Samantha Weinstein	Nominated	
Canadian Screen Awards	2025	Best Original Song	Meiro Stamm, Antonio Naranjo "We Are Dogs"	Nominated	
Canadian Screen Awards	2026	Best Preschool Program or Series	Phil McCordic, Shereen Ali, Norma Mendoza	Nominated	
Canadian Screen Awards	2026	Best Voice Performance	Patty Sullivan	Nominated	
Canadian Screen Awards	2026	Best Voice Performance	Mia SwamiNathan	Nominated	
Canadian Screen Awards	2026	Best Original Song	Phil McCordic, Meiro Stamm, Antonio Naranjo "Sneaking and Creeping"	Nominated	
Canadian Screen Awards	2026	Best Writing in a Preschool Program or Series	Phil McCordic, "Mittens & Pants Christmas Special"	Nominated	
Canadian Screen Awards	2026	Best Writing in a Preschool Program or Series	Haslett Murphy, "Abraca-Hamster"	Nominated	
Canadian Screen Awards	2026	Canada Media Fund Kids' Choice		Won	
ACTRA Toronto Awards	2026	Outstanding Voice Performance, Youth	Athan Giazitzidis	Won	
WGC Screenwriting Awards	2026	Best Writing, Preschool	Katherine Sandford, "Pants in the Box"	Won	
