= The Mighty Jungle =

The Mighty Jungle may refer to:

- The Mighty Jungle (Canadian TV series), the 2008 Canadian puppet series
- The Mighty Jungle (American TV series), the 1994 American sitcom
