= Gisèle's Big Backyard =

Canadian children's television series

Gisèle's Big Backyard is a Canadian children's television series, which aired on TVOntario from 2006 to 2019. Hosted and produced by children's entertainer and educator Gisèle Corinthios as a continuation of her earlier series The Nook, the series featured Corinthios, puppet supporting characters and guests entertaining and educating children according to the HighScope curriculum of early childhood education.

The series aired as short segments inserted between other programs in the TVOKids programming block. It also produced interactive games and educational videos for the TVOntario website.

Puppets included Sticks the Squirrel (Jason Hopley), Jay the Blue Jay (Ali Eisner), Melvin the Skunk (Marty Stelnick), This (Ryan Field), That (Frank Meschkuleit), and Polkaroo. Polkaroo's quartet of "Polka Dot Door Friends" Bear, Dumpty, Humpty and Marigold also appear in smaller-than-human doll size rather than larger-than-human suits. This was their first re-appearance since Polka Dot Shorts ended in 2001.

The series won the Gemini Award for Best Pre-School Program or Series at the 21st Gemini Awards in 2006, and was nominated in the same category at the 24th Gemini Awards in 2009 and at the 26th Gemini Awards in 2011. At the 26th Gemini Awards and the 1st Canadian Screen Awards, Corinthios received nominations for Best Host in a Children's or Youth Program or Series

The series ended production of new episodes in 2016, although previously produced segments have continued to air on the network.
