= Ken Cuperus =

Canadian television writer and producer

Ken Cuperus (born 1972) is a Canadian television writer and producer, who is a partner with his wife Michelle Melanson in the children's television production firm Headspinner Productions. He is most noted as a writer of the children's television series Happy House of Frightenstein, for which he and writing partner Sandy Jobin-Bevans won the Canadian Screen Award for Best Writing in an Animated Program or Series at the 10th Canadian Screen Awards in 2022 and Best Writing in a Preschool Program or Series at the 11th Canadian Screen Awards in 2023.

Originally from Winnipeg, Manitoba, he began his career as a member of the sketch comedy troupe Brave New Weasels with Jobin-Bevans, Ron Moore and Matt Kippen, as well as writing for the television series Freaky Stories and the short film Good Monday, for which he received a Canadian Comedy Award nomination for Best Writing in a Film at the 2nd Canadian Comedy Awards in 2001.

He was subsequently a writer for television series such as Marvin the Tap-Dancing Horse, Medabots, John Callahan's Quads!, George Shrinks, The Berenstain Bears, Moville Mysteries, The Doodlebops, Carl², Stargate: Atlantis and Total Drama before creating the television series The Stanley Dynamic in 2015.

Cuperus and Melanson launched Headspinner in 2018. The company's productions have included Happy House of Frightenstein, Denis and Me and Aunty B's House. Ken is also one of the head writers for Mistletoe Murders on the Hallmark Channel.
