= Sandy Jobin-Bevans =

Canadian comedian and actor

- Born: April 21, 1972 (age 54); Flin Flon, Manitoba, Canada
- Occupations: Actor, comedian, screenwriter, television presenter
- Years active: 2001–present
- Known for: Happy House of Frightenstein; Great Home Giveaway; Deal with It
- Height: 1.93 m (6 ft 4 in)
- Spouse: Kylee Evans (m. 2017)
- Awards: Canadian Screen Award for Best Writing, Pre-School; Canadian Screen Award for Best Writing in an Animated Program or Series; Canadian Screen Award for Best Pre-School Program or Series; Canadian Screen Award for Best Host or Presenter, Factual or Reality/Competition; Canadian Comedy Award for Internet / Best Male Performance in a Web Series; Canadian Comedy Award for Live / Best Male Improvisor; Canadian Comedy Award for Television / Best Performance by an Ensemble – Television

Sandy Jobin-Bevans (born April 21, 1972) is a Canadian comedian, actor and television writer.

== Biography ==
He is most noted as a writer of the children's television series Happy House of Frightenstein, for which he and writing partner Ken Cuperus won the Canadian Screen Award for Best Writing in an Animated Program or Series at the 10th Canadian Screen Awards in 2022 and Best Writing in a Preschool Program or Series at the 11th Canadian Screen Awards in 2023.

A native of Flin Flon, Manitoba, he began performing improv comedy while studying at the University of Manitoba. In the late 1990s, he was a member of the sketch comedy troupes Brave New Weasels with Cuperus, Ron Moore and Matt Kippen, and Slap Happy with Dave Pearce, Tabetha Wells and Kerry Griffin. Beginning in 2000, he joined the cast of The Second City's Toronto company, appearing for the first time in The Puck Stops Here. He left Second City in 2001, but returned in March 2003 and remained with the company through the end of its 2004 season.

In 2005, he played the lead in Waylen Miki's musical comedy SARSical at the Toronto Fringe Festival, and continued to tour and perform with Slap Happy.

In 2009, he returned to Second City as director of Shut Up and Show Us Your Tweets, and was a regular in the Comedy Network sketch comedy series Hotbox.

From 2011 to 2013, he had a regular role as Jack Foster in the YTV teen sitcom Life with Boys. In 2013, he played one of the Hanson Brothers in Slap Shot Live, Second City's stage adaptation of the cult comedy film Slap Shot.

From 2017 to 2019, Jobin-Bevans and his wife, Kylee Evans, were hosts of the children's game show Just Like Mom and Dad. In 2023, he had a supporting role in the comedy-drama film Suze.

Slap Happy were three-time Canadian Comedy Award winners for Best Improv Troupe or Company, winning at the 3rd Canadian Comedy Awards in 2002, the 4th Canadian Comedy Awards in 2003, and the 6th Canadian Comedy Awards in 2005. Jobin-Bevans was a nominee for Best Male Improviser at the 11th Canadian Comedy Awards in 2010, and for Best Male Performance in a Web Series for Bill & Sons Towing at the 16th Canadian Comedy Awards in 2015.
