= Dominique Jolin =

Creator of Toopy and Binoo

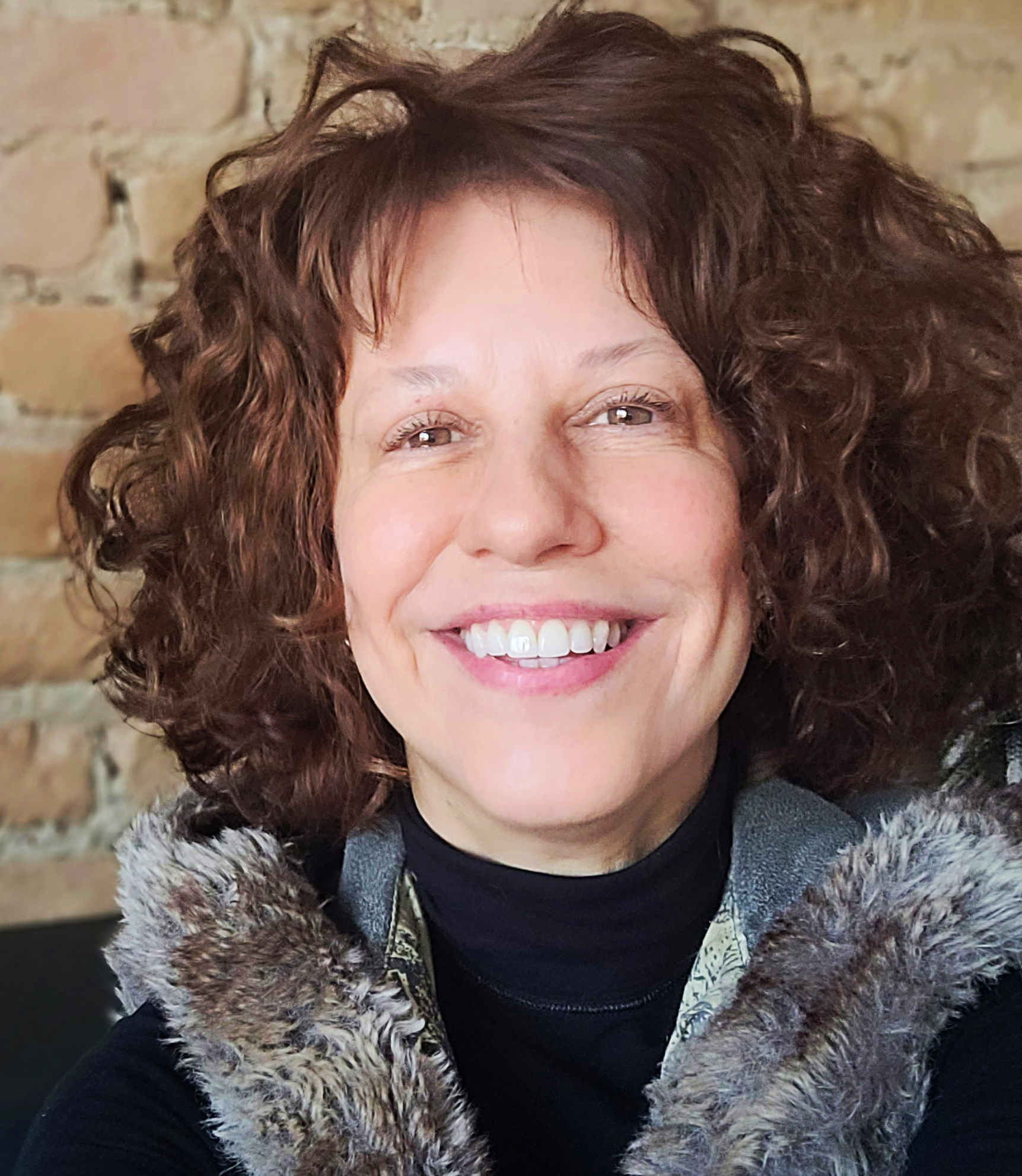
- Dominique Jolin
- Born: October 24, 1964 (age 62)
- Occupations: Writer, illustrator, scriptwriter and content producer.
- Known for: Creator of Toopy and Binoo
- Website: https://www.dominiquejolin.com/

Dominique Jolin, born October 24, 1964, in Quebec, is a Canadian writer, illustrator, scriptwriter and content producer. She is the creator of the characters Toopy and Binoo.

== Biography ==
After university studies in youth literature, creative writing and scriptwriting, she published her first children's book in 1992, It's Not Fair! which earned her the Mr. Christie's Book Award.

Since then, she has written and/or illustrated a hundred children's books published in French, English, Spanish, Catalan and Korean, many of which have won her awards and distinctions.

In 1996, she created two characters for a literacy series: Toopy and Binoo.

In 2005, Dominique Jolin presented her characters to a production company, Spectra Animation.

Then, in collaboration with Raymond Lebrun, author and director, she adapted Toopy and Binoo into an animated television series.

In 2013, Dominique Jolin and Raymond Lebrun created two new animated series for children: YaYa & Zouk and Genius Genie.

Dominique Jolin and Raymond Lebrun wrote and directed a feature-length animated film, Toopy and Binoo, which was released in August 2023.

== Children's literature publications ==
=== Selected books ===
- Au cinéma avec papa, Raton Laveur, 1991
- Nom de nom!, text by Pierrette Dubé, Raton Laveur, 1992
- C’est pas juste!, Raton Laveur, 1992
- Qu’est-ce que vous faites là?, Raton Laveur, 1993
- Mario le pingouin, text by Michel St-Denis, Héritage, 1994
- Un prof extra, text by Dorothée Roy, Raton Laveur, 1994
- Pas de bébé pour Babette, 400 coups, 1995
- Cruelle Cruellina, text by Carole Tremblay, 400 coups, 1995
- Roméo le rat romantique, text by Carole Tremblay, Dominique et cie, 1997
- Marie-Baba et les quarante rameurs, text by Carole Tremblay, Dominique et cie, 1998
- Bambou à l’école des singes, text by Lucie Papineau, Dominique et cie, 1999
- Attends une minute!, 400 coups, 1999
- Bambou à la plage, text by Lucie Papineau, Dominique et cie, 2000
- Destructotor, text by Carole Tremblay, Dominique et cie, 2000
- Bambou à l’école des bambous, text by Lucie Papineau, Dominique et cie, 2001
- Juliette, la rate romantique, text by Carole Tremblay, Dominique et cie, 2003
- Chut fais dodo, La Bagnole, 2016

=== Toopy and Binoo series (books) ===
- Toupie a peur, Dominique et cie, 1996
- Toupie dit bonne nuit, Dominique et cie, 1996
- Le bobo de Toupie, Dominique et cie, 1996
- Toupie se fâche, Dominique et cie, 1996
- Toupie joue à cache-cache, Dominique et cie, 1997
- Un ami pour Toupie, Dominique et cie, 1997
- La promenade de Toupie, Dominique et cie, 1998
- Toupie raconte une histoire, Dominique et cie, 1998
- Toupie se déguise, Dominique et cie, 1999
- Toupie veut jouer, Dominique et cie, 1999
- Toupie fait la sieste, Dominique et cie, 2000
- Le shampoing de Toupie, Dominique et cie, 2000
- Joyeux noël Toupie, Dominique et cie, 2000
- Toupie aime Toupie, Dominique et cie, 2000
- Le petit Toupie rouge, Dominique et cie, 2001
- Super Toupie, Dominique et cie, 2001
- Robinson Toupie, Dominique et cie, 2002
- L’Halloween de Toupie, Dominique et cie, 2002
- Abracadabre Toupie!, Dominique et cie, 2003
- Toupie et le sommeil perdu, Dominique et cie, 2003

=== Binoo series (books) ===
- Coucou Binou!, Dominique et cie, 2001
- Comment ça va Binou?, Dominique et cie, 2001
- Binou en couleurs, Dominique et cie, 2001
- Binou et les sons, Dominique et cie, 2001
- Binou joue, Dominique et cie, 2002
- Brave Binou, Dominique et cie, 2002
- Beau dodo Binou, Binou joue, Dominique et cie, 2002
- Le ballon de Binou, Dominique et cie, 2002
- Binou joue, Dominique et cie, 2002
- À l’eau Binou, Dominique et cie, 2002
- Ça flotte Binou?, Dominique et cie, 2002
- Binou-la-bulle, Dominique et cie, 2004
- Le bébé de Binou, Dominique et cie, 2004

=== Yaya et Zouk series (books) ===
- Si j’étais toute seule, La Bagnole, 2013
- Si j’étais super Yaya, La Bagnole, 2013
- Si j’étais en colère, La Bagnole, 2013
- Si j’étais un bébé, La Bagnole, 2013

=== TV series ===
- Toopy and Binoo, season I - 104 X 5 minutes (Co-writer with Raymond Lebrun)
- Toopy and Binoo, season II - 6 X 22 minutes, 78 X 2 minutes (Co-writer with Raymond Lebrun)
- Yaya et Zouk, season I - 78 X 5 minutes (Co-writer with Raymond Lebrun)
- Genius Genie - Concept (Co-writer with Raymond Lebrun)
- Toopy and Binoo: Fabulous Adventures, season I - 54 X 7 minutes (Co-writer with Raymond Lebrun)

=== Feature film ===
- Toopy and Binoo: The Movie - 80 minutes (Co-writer and co-director with Raymond Lebrun)

== Awards ==
- 1992 Mr. Christie's Book Award (for illustrations) for C'est pas juste!
- 1993- Livromagie prize (children's favourite book) for Au cinéma avec Papa
- 1995- Livromagie prize (children's favourite book) for Qu'est-ce que vous faites là?
- 1996- Livromagie prize (children's favourite book) for Un prof extra
- 1997- Livromagie prize (favourite children's book) for Cruelle Cruellina
- 1997- Finalist for the Mr. Christie's Book Award for Roméo le rat romantique
- 1998- Finalist for the Mr. Christie's Book Award for Marie-Baba et les quarante rameurs
- 2000- Silver Seal of the Mr. Christie's Book Award for Destructotor
- 2002- GVL illustration prize (Youth Illustration Award at the Trois-Rivières Book Fair) for Le Petit Toupie Rouge
- 2006- Boomerang Award (Toopy and Binoo's website)
- 2007- Award of Excellence for Toopy and Binoo in the New Canadian Media category
- 2007- Finalist at the Gemini Awards for Toopy and Binoo, category: Preschool animated series
- 2016- Gémeaux nomination for Toopy and Binoo (best television series)
- 2019- Gemini Award nomination for YaYa and Zouk (Best Animated Series or Program)
