= Phil McCordic =

Canadian actor

- Education: University of Windsor
- Occupations: Actor; producer; director; writer; television host
- Known for: Crawlspace/The Space (1999–2003); Zerby Derby (2013–2016); Science Max: Experiments at Large (2015–2018)

Phil McCordic is a Canadian actor, host, director, producer, and writer. He has created children's programming for YTV, CBC Television, and TVOntario.

He has won numerous awards, including 3 Canadian Screen Awards, one for each season of Science Max, Experiments at Large.

== Filmography ==
Television
Year	Title	Role	Notes
1996–1998	The BZone	Host	
1998–1999	Mad Science Touring Show	Lead	250 shows, every Canadian province and 43 states
1999–2003	Crawlspace/The Space	Host	1500+ hours of live interstitial television
1999	Medabots	Ginkai	English version
2001	Reading Rangers	Ranger Phil, Doc, Eeeny, Zachary	
2003	Miss Spider's Sunny Patch Kids	Flint	TV movie
2003	deafplanet	Writer	
2004	Miss Spider's Sunny Patch Friends	Flint	3 episodes
2004–2011	Tumbletown Tales	Creator, Writer, voice of Tumbleweed	78 episodes
2006	Weird Years	Ivan, additional voices Writer	
2006–2007	Erky Perky	Writer	5 episodes
2007–2013	Kids' CBC	Senior Producer	Gemini Award, Youth Media Alliance Award, Golden Sheaf, New York Children's Media Award
2010	Making Stuff	Gears, Wiz	22 episodes
2012	Franklin and Friends	Writer	Episode: "Franklin and the Nature Nuts Hike/Franklin and the Terrible, Terrible Bubble"
2013–2016	Zerby Derby	Creator, series producer, director, writer, voice actor	117 episodes
2014	Hi Opie!	Director	Season 1
2015–2018	Science Max: Experiments at Large	Creator, Series Producer, Host, Writer	39 episodes
2017	Dot.	Writer	Episode: "What Goes Up, Must Come Down"
2020	Corn & Peg	Writer	Episode: "Do Good Hotline"
2022-present	Mittens & Pants	Writer, producer	
