= Artzooka! =

Educational children's TV series

- Genre: Art
- Starring: Jeremie Saunders (Kids' CBC); Nils Bomhoff (Nickelodeon Germany)
- Countries of origin: Canada; Germany (Season 1)
- No. of seasons: 3
- No. of episodes: 357

Production
- Executive producers: Arnie Zipursky, Charles Falzon
- Running time: 24 minutes
- Production companies: CCI Entertainment; MotionWorks (Season 1)

Original release
- Network: Kids' CBC (Canada); Nickelodeon (Germany)
- Release: September 21, 2010 – April 13, 2012

Artzooka! is a children's TV series revolving around art and making things in the home. The series was originally presented by Jeremie Saunders for the show's original Kids' CBC version, while the Nickelodeon Germany version was presented by Nils Bomhoff.

The series was produced by CCI Entertainment in association with the Canadian Broadcasting Corporation and with the participation of the Nova Scotia Film Industry Tax Credit, the Canada Media Fund, the Shaw Rocket Fund, the Department of Canadian Heritage, the Canadian Film or Video Production Tax Credit and the Ontario Media Development Corporation, with the first season being co-produced as a Canadian-German co-production with MotionWorks GMBH and with the support from Mitteldeutsche Medienförderung and MTV Networks Germany. The series originally premiered in Germany on Nickelodeon Germany in February 2010 before it expanded internationally.

== Premise ==
Each episode would revolve around something, which would inspire the host, Jeremie Saunders, to do an art project about the episode's topic. While doing the art project, he would show viewers the steps to do the art project.

== Segments ==
- Make Idea
- Art? (1)
- Silly What?
- Lights Camera Artzooka!/Make Art Idea
- Art? (2)
- Drawing Idea (Episode Used In Secret Hiding Place, Photos and Celebrating Art)
- Paper Bag Movie
- An Artzooka! Challenge
- Art? (3)
- Make Craft Idea
- Artzooka Safety Message
- Drawing Idea
- An Artzooka! Challenge Movie

== Broadcast ==
While some regions broadcast the original Canadian version of the series with Jeremie Saunders (especially in the UK, where it was so massive that the chain HobbyCraft carried the arts and crafts sets they released) dubbed over by local actors, other countries produced their own version of the show like with Germany. The French version of the show, which aired on France 5, was hosted by Mark Antoine. A local version for Latin America which aired on Discovery Kids also exists.

Reruns were broadcast in the United States on the Qubo television network from June 30, 2012 (alongside Taste Buds, Jakers! The Adventures of Piggley Winks and Harry and His Bucket Full of Dinosaurs) to May 31, 2015. Reruns were aired once more from September 28, 2015 to March 24, 2017, then again from January 6, 2018 to March 25, 2018.
