= Happy House of Frightenstein =

Canadian animated television series

Happy House of Frightenstein is a Canadian animated television series for preschoolers, which premiered on Family Jr. in 2021. A reboot of the 1970s children's series The Hilarious House of Frightenstein, the series focuses on the childhood adventures of five of the original show's main characters as children.

The voice cast includes Luke Dietz as Count Jr., Nendia Lewars as Wolfie (the Wolfman), Addison Chou as Grizz (Grizelda), Brandon St. Bernard as Iggy (Igor), and Anthony Sardinha as Gronk.

The series was produced by Headspinner Productions, and broadcast by Family Jr.

The series received three Canadian Screen Award nominations at the 10th Canadian Screen Awards in 2022, for Best Pre-School Program or Series, Best Writing, Animation (Ken Cuperus and Sandy Jobin-Bevans for "Hide and Go Eek") and Best Original Music, Animation (Peter Chapman for "Wolfie's Last Howl"). The series won the Canadian Screen Award for Best Writing, Animation.
