= Pat Ellingson =

Canadian television producer and executive

Pat Ellingson is a Canadian television producer. consultant and executive. The head of children's programming at TVOntario from 1998 until her retirement in 2015, she played a prominent role in the development and expansion of the network's efforts in multiplatform digital media production, and was a producer or executive producer of shows such as Dino Dan, The Mysteries of Alfred Hedgehog, Wild Kratts, Annedroids, This Is Daniel Cook, Peep and the Big Wide World, Gisèle’s Big Backyard, Reading Rangers, Super Citizens and Tumbletown Tales. She won a Gemini Award in 2006 as producer of Gisele's Big Backyard.

At the 6th Canadian Screen Awards in 2018, the Academy of Canadian Cinema and Television named Ellingson the winner of its Outstanding Media Innovation Award.
