= The Mighty Jungle (Canadian TV series) =

- Created by: Jason Hopley; Jeff Rosen
- Starring: Frank Meschkuleit; Mike Petersen; Wendy Welch; Jamie Bradley; Cheryl Wagner
- Opening theme: "The Mighty Jungle"
- Ending theme: "The Mighty Jungle" (Instrumental)
- Composer: John Welsman
- Country of origin: Canada
- Original language: English
- No. of seasons: 2
- No. of episodes: 46

Production
- Executive producers: Michael Donovan; Charles Bishop; Cheryl Hassen; Beth Stevenson
- Producer: Katrina Walsh
- Running time: 11 minutes
- Production companies: Decode Entertainment; Halifax Film

Original release
- Network: CBC Television
- Release: September 1, 2008 – 2010

The Mighty Jungle is a Canadian puppet series created by Jeff Rosen and Jason Hopley. The narrative of the story is largely crafted by a group of preschoolers who appear in live-action segments interspersed between puppet-acted scenes. It was produced by Halifax Film and distributed by Decode Entertainment, both DHX Media (now as WildBrain) companies, and produced in association with CBC Television. The series is broadcast in Canada on CBC Television on the Kids' CBC programming block, and in the United States on Sprout. In Latin America, it aired on Playhouse Disney in Spanish as Había una vez... en la selva poderosa.

== Plot ==
Babu the meerkat, along with his friends Bruce the gorilla and Rhonda the rhinoceros, explore many of the same issues that very young children face, such as wanting to win, feeling silly, or not knowing how much is "too much" of a good thing. As the story illustrating the day's theme is played out, the narrative occasionally pauses so that the live-action preschoolers can suggest a course of action for the puppet characters to take, and often the puppets will react to the advice they receive. Sometimes, there may even be a song related to a part of an episode's story.

== Characters ==
- Babu (performed by Frank Meschkuleit) is a meerkat who isn't scared of anything.
- Bruce (performed by Mike Peterson) is a gorilla who is always nervous. He is always having fun with the help of his friends and his safety helmet.
- Rhonda (performed by Wendy Welch) is a rhinoceros that enjoys playing dress-up. She likes playing by the rules, including the ones she makes up.

== Cast ==
=== Puppeteers ===
- Jamie Bradley as Wendall the Sloth, Mr. Bristle the Warthog, Pizza Monkey, Steven the Elephant, Baby Kiko the Meerkat, Rainbow Unicorn, Dragon Dentist, Winter Wizard, Glinda the Stinky Flower, Eric the Baby Lion, Chocolate Marshmallow Monkey, Magical Unicorn, Chucky the Cheetah, Friendly Octopus, Baby Dinosaur, River Pigs.
- Frank Meschkuleit as Babu the Meerkat
- Mike Petersen as Bruce the Gorilla
- Cheryl Wagner as Lala the Lion Cub
- Wendy Welch as Rhonda the Rhinoceros

== Episodes ==
=== Season 1 (2008) ===
1. Planet Crazy
2. Babysitting Kico
3. Tag that Sloth
4. The Magic Hat
5. The Ice Cream Castle
6. Dress-Up Tea Party
7. Babu's Missing Ball
8. Watch That Egg!
9. Bruce's First Sleepover
10. The Mighty Jungle Club
11. Bananas for Bananas
12. Queen Rhonda
13. Spot the Giraffe
14. (It's Not Easy) Being Stinky
15. All That Sparkles
16. Mighty Juice
17. Jungle Picnic
18. Jungle Snow Day
19. Beehive Boogie
20. Flower Picking Rules
21. Jungle Campout
22. Chocolate Marshmallow the Monkey
23. Rhonda's Candy
24. Wand-a-Rhonda
25. Rhonda's Birthday
26. Silly Day in the Jungle

=== Season 2 (2009-2010) ===
1. Babu and the Giant
2. The Wishing Star
3. Bruce's Surprise Party
4. Rhonda's New Friend
5. Bruce Loses His Helmet
6. Friends for Life
7. Mighty Jungle Safari
8. Babu and the Tooth Fairy
9. Cindergorrila
10. Mighty Jungle Time Machine
11. Space Pig
12. Mighty Jungle Unicorn
13. Mighty Jungle Parade
14. Mighty Fast Babu
15. Babu and the Itch
16. Super Babu
17. Under the Mighty Sea
18. Rhonda's Makeover
19. Monster Tea Party
20. Mighty Banana Shortage
