= Tales of the Riverbank =

British children's television show (1959–1998)

- Hammy the Hamster and G.P. the Guinea Pig during the episode "Hammy the Flying Postman"
- Also known as: Hammy Hamster; Once Upon a Hamster
- Genre: Children's television
- Created by: Dave Ellison; Paul Sutherland
- Written by: Dave Ellison; Charles Fullman; Paul Sutherland; Cliff Braggins
- Presented by: Peggy Miller
- Voices of: Paul Sutherland (Canada); Johnny Morris (UK)
- Narrated by: Paul Sutherland (Canada); Johnny Morris (UK)
- Opening theme: Raccolta, op. 43, no. 6: Andante in C by Mauro Giuliani
- Countries of origin: United Kingdom; Canada; Spain
- Original language: English
- No. of series: 5
- No. of episodes: 143; First: 13; Second: 39; Hammy Hamster: 26; HBO/C4: 65

Production
- Producers: Dave Ellison; Paul Sutherland
- Cinematography: Josef Seckeresh
- Production companies: Riverbank Productions (1960–1963); Working Title Television (1991–1992); Delroy (1991–1992); Hammytime Productions (1995–1998); Cosgrove Hall Films (1997-1998); Alfonso Productions (1997-1998)

Original release
- Network: BBC (1960); ITV (Hammy Hamster) (1972); Channel 4 (1991–1998); YTV (Canada, 1995–1998); MTV (United Kingdom, 1997-1998)

Tales of the Riverbank, sometimes called Hammy Hamster and Once Upon a Hamster for the Canadian version, is a British children's television series developed from a Canadian pilot. The original series was later broadcast on Canadian and U.S. television, dubbed by Canadian and US actors for the markets they were to be broadcast in.

The pilot was created by David Ellison and Paul Sutherland, CBC film editors, in 1959. After completing the pilot programme, CBC turned down the production and so Dave Ellison travelled to the BBC in London to show it. The BBC initially commissioned thirteen episodes, but extended this later. A second series was made in colour in the 1970s, narrated by Johnny Morris.

== Revival ==
A later remake was produced by Canada's YTV and Channel 4 in 1995 which ran for three years, and a feature-length film was made in 2008 using puppets rather than live animals.

== Format ==
The programme had human voices in sync with the actions of the live animals, to give the impression that the creatures were performing activities. They lived in a place called "The Riverbank" and operated various artefacts including toy sailboats, cars, and even a diving bell. Various techniques were used to persuade the animals to do what was required, including smearing jam on the objects they were to handle. The voices were selected to reflect the personalities of the animals. Each episode ended with the narrator alluding to an event involving the characters, but refusing to elaborate, saying "But that is another story."

The original black and white Tales of the Riverbank series was first shown by the BBC on 3 July 1960 at 4:50 pm. It was originally narrated by Paul Sutherland, but the BBC did not want Canadian accents and so for the BBC showings, all the voices were provided by Johnny Morris. The series was eventually sold to 34 countries around the world.

== Telecast and home release ==
In the U.S., The show also aired on the Animal Planet during the late 1990s and early 2000s.

=== UK VHS releases ===
VHS title	Release date	Episodes
Further Tales of the Riverbank - The Picnic and other Stories (VC1259)	5 October 1992	The First Day of Spring, Sunken Treasure, The Fortune Teller, The Flying Lesson, The Picnic, King Gus's Birthday, Hammy the Helpful Hamster, Flying High, The Circus
Further Tales of the Riverbank - A Nice Surprise and other Stories (VC1279)	8 February 1993	G.P.'s Medicine, Litter Bugs, The Riverbank Clock, The Drought, Say Cheese, Mischief, First Past The Post, Hammy The Flying Postman, A Nice Surprise
Further Tales of the Riverbank - The Race and other Stories (VC1310)	12 July 1993	Windy Weather, The Magic Word, G.P to the Rescue, King Gus's False Alarm, The Race, Hammy's Crystal Ball, Roderick to the Rescue, The Flood

=== UK DVD releases ===
DVD title	Release date	Episodes
Further Tales of the Riverbank - Volume 1	September 2013	The First Day of Spring, Sunken Treasure, Hammy the Helpful Hamster, The Flying Lesson, The Circus, Litter Bugs, River Bank Race, The Flood, Hammy's Crystal Ball.
Further Tales of the Riverbank - Volume 2	April 2015	Hammy the Flying Postman, The Riverbank Clock, Say Cheese, GP to the Rescue, GP's Medicine, A Nice Surprise, Windy Weather, Roderick to the Rescue.
Further Tales of the Riverbank - Volume 3	April 2016	The Fortune Teller, The Picnic, Flying High, King Gus's Birthday, The Drought, Mischief, First Past the Post, The Magic Word, King Gus's False Alarm

=== US DVD releases ===
DVD title	Episodes
Hammy Hamster Volume 1	Arrival - Hammy Finds the Riverbank, The Boothouse
Hammy Hamster Volume 2	Birdwatching, Contest with the Wind
Hammy Hamster Volume 3	The Golden Flower, The Aeroplane
Hammy Hamster Volume 4	Bubbles, The Monster
Hammy Hamster Volume 5	A Diving We Shall Go, Garage Sale Recycling Story
Hammy Hamster Volume 6	The Golden Coach, Hammy's Wings
Hammy Hamster Volume 7	Spring Has Sprung, Little Red Hammy Hoops, Package from the Sky, The Music Box
Hammy Hamster Volume 8	Ship Ahoy, The Bat Story, The Visit, Sherlock Hammy
Hammy Hamster Volume 9	Soap Box Derby, Hammy to the Rescue, Corkers, Cap'n Toadie's Band, GP's Amazing Machine
Hammy Hamster Volume 10	Who am I?, Dig, The Big Wheel, The Riverbank Fair

== Further episodes ==
After the original thirteen episodes, 39 further episodes were made in black-and-white. The majority were written by David Ellison, Charles Fullman, Paul Sutherland and Cliff Braggins. The episodes of Tales of the Riverbank purchased by the BBC were adapted by staff writer Peggy Miller. Much of the filming was done on location at Wootton Creek on the Isle of Wight.

A later series with 26 episodes was filmed in colour in the 1970s, retitled Hammy Hamster (full title: Hammy Hamster's Adventures On the Riverbank) launched in 1972. The BBC had introduced a policy of not using human voices for live animals and so this series was shown in the UK by ITV. In Australia, the show aired on ABC TV through the 1970s as Adventures on the River Bank.

The final series, dubbed Further Tales of the Riverbank, made from 1991 to 1992, was produced for WTTV and Channel 4; 26 episodes of that series were made. It is ranked 79th in Channel 4's 2001 poll of the 100 Greatest Kids' TV shows. This series was the only one to have been released on DVD, in a set of three DVDs published in-house by Hammytime Productions UK.

In the United States, Once Upon A Hamster was broadcast in a late-night slot, which helped the programme transcend its intended audience and develop a cult status among US viewers.

The late Dave Ellison launched his own website to regularly update information about Hammy Hamster and his friends. He was also involved with optimising the TV show, last shown on Channel 4, for release on DVD.

Three children's books were published by Scholastic Publications Ltd in 1993 based on the series and illustrated by Pauline Hazelwood.

== Main characters ==
In the later series the list of characters was expanded from the original first three listed below.

Character	Description
Hammy Hamster	The series' main protagonist and best-known character. He is a curious and kind golden hamster who lives in an old boot on the Riverbank. He later became G.P.'s co-pilot in the episode The Aeroplane Ride.
Roderick the Water Rat	Hammy's best friend. He is a cautious, resourceful rat who and owns a small motorboat. In the Canadian and U.S. versions of the series, this character was Matty or Martha Mouse (although the "mouse" is really a rat). In Australia, the character was known as Matthew.
G. P. the Guinea Pig	A boastful and creative guinea pig, who is the Riverbank's resident inventor. His creations included a "winch-a-ma-bob" and a "recyclamobile". He lived in a wooden house with a prominent water wheel at the front. He had a small plane, which he flew in several episodes, and spoke in a voice that sounded rather like W. C. Fields (in the BBC version, he speaks with a strong Yorkshire accent). In the 1990s version, he is depicted as an Abyssinian guinea pig.
Turtle	A slow and plodding turtle character. He teaches his friends the importance of patience.
Wise Old Frog	A grouchy but clever frog. His wise advice is often sought by the other characters.
Granny Rabbit	A rabbit who acts as a grandmother to the whole community. She is fond of baking, singing and story-telling.
Berti and Herbi	Roderick's sneaky hamster nephews, who have no relation to Hammy. Appear in Bubbles.
The Owl	An owl who is always seen on a tree branch, the only word it usually ever says is "who", but will sometimes say other question words.
King Gus	A guinea pig dressed in a crown and a cloak with ermine, who appears in several episodes, most notably "King Gus' Birthday".

== Feature film ==
A feature-length film, also titled Tales of the Riverbank, was released in September 2008 directly to DVD. It used a mix of puppets, live action, and special effects. Directed by John Henderson, produced by Handmade Pictures and starring Stephen Fry as Owl, Ardal O'Hanlon as Hammy, Steve Coogan as Roderick and Jim Broadbent as G. P., the story follows three friends who live in a riverbank. After being swept away from their homes by a storm, they embark on an adventure to find their home and save it from the danger of the Fat Cats' factory.

== US news broadcast accidental reference ==
A publicity image by David Ellison of Hammy Hamster holding a clapperboard (Note: The pic is now the trademarked property of Hammytime Productions UK, reprinted on page 69 of True North: Everything You Wanted to Know About Canadian Television by Peter Kenter (Vancouver/Toronto: Whitecap, 2001, ISBN 1-55285-146-X))) made an unexpected appearance on a January 2009 news broadcast regarding the disappearance of a young girl named Molly Bish. During a report regarding the questioning of a potential suspect eight years after the girl's disappearance, an error resulted in the image of Hammy Hamster being shown instead of a photo of the potential suspect.

== See also ==
- Anthropomorphism
