= Jeremie Saunders =

Canadian actor and podcaster

Jeremie Saunders is a Canadian actor and podcaster, who has been a two-time winner of the Gemini/Canadian Screen Award for Best Host in a Pre-School, Children's or Youth Program or Series, winning at the 26th Gemini Awards in 2011 and at the 1st Canadian Screen Awards in 2013, as host of the children's television series Artzooka!.

He has also been a host of the podcasts Sickboy, and Turn Me On, with his ex-wife Bryde MacLean. In 2017, he was the subject of a documentary film by Andrew MacCormack about his work on Sickboy.

In 2020, he was awarded a Meritorious Service Medal for his work educating listeners about chronic disease through Sickboy.

Originally from St. John's, Newfoundland, he is based in Halifax, Nova Scotia.
