= Zerby Derby =

- Country of origin: Canada
- Original language: English
- No. of seasons: 3
- No. of episodes: 121

Production
- Running time: 28 minutes
- Production company: Breakthrough Entertainment

Original release
- Network: Sprout (U.S.); TVOKids (Canada)
- Release: August 26, 2013 – September 7, 2016

Zerby Derby is a Canadian preschool television series that was created by Phil McCordic. It aired on Sprout & Qubo in the US. Its French version (shown on Mini TFO) is called Zoubi Doubi.

== Plot ==
The series follows the adventures of anthropomorphic motor vehicles Zack, Lily, Rex and Axle as they embark on daily adventures of crossing streams, building dams and exploring meadows, approaching every potential problem with cheerful enthusiasm. No obstacle is too large for the Zerbies, thanks to their mantra "try, try again!". The vehicles are remote-controlled and also employ moving eyes for added expression. A number of episodes aired from 2013 to 2016, though regular uploads occur on the show's new YouTube channel.

== Voice cast ==
- Phil McCordic – Zack, Bob the Boat, Fill the Front Loader, Rey, Jake
- Stacey DePass – Lily, Sandy the Bulldozer, Annie, Mags, Jewel
- Jason Hopley – Axle, Chase the Helicopter, Walter the Wash Truck, Spike
- Ron Pardo – Rex, Strut, (Seasons 1 & 2) Flynn the Float Plane (Season 2)
- Kirsten Alter – Fran the Ferry, Mika the Mechanic (Season 2)

== Episodes ==
=== Season 1 (2013) ===
1. Big Rock, Sandy Mountain / Eye in the Sky / The Construction Zerby Race (August 29, 2013)
2. The Big Move / Flower Power / Best Jump Ever (August 30, 2013)
3. Mazy Days of Summer / Boat House / Zerby Turn (September 5, 2013)
4. A Better Bridge / Axle's Track / Zack Camps Out (September 6, 2013)
5. The Zerby Town Dam (September 7, 2013) / Hide and Seek (September 3, 2013) / The Zerbowl (September 4, 2013)
6. Tunnel Drat / Raking Leaves / Up a Tree (September 9, 2013)
7. Gravel Gully / Rex in the Air / Wind Breaker (September 10, 2013)
8. Rainy Day in Zerby Town / Bottleneck / Balancing Act (September 11, 2013)
9. Upstream / Stumped / Force of Wheel (September 12, 2013)
10. Driftwood Dilemma / Zerby Town Mountain / Beached Bob (September 13, 2013)
11. Ides of Marsh (October 9, 2013) / To Build a Raft / Running Water (October 10, 2013)
12. Lily Gets Moved / Trail Blocker / Making Waves (November 16, 2013)
13. Mud Brothers / Crossed Roads / The Bumpiest Road (November 30, 2013)

=== Season 2 (2014) ===
1. Between a Rock and a Wet Place / Disappearing Leaf Pile / Switchback (August 28, 2014)
2. Construction Zone / Fran Aground / Double Decker Zerby (August 29, 2014)
3. One Lane or Two / Chase on the Water / Sandscape (September 20, 2014)
4. Depth Thoughts / Tunnel Vision / A Bridge for All Zerbies (September 27, 2014)
5. Esti-mates / Zerby Bridge / Zerby Carrier (October 4, 2014)
6. The Big Top / Lighthouse / Sandy Tracks (October 11, 2014)
7. Stuck in the Mud / Fill-a-Vator / Ferry Windy Day (October 18, 2014)
8. Yoo Hoo / Axle's Hill / Boats and Floats (October 25, 2014)
9. In a Pinch / Wind Chime / Slippery Bridge (November 1, 2014)
10. Splash From the Fast / Dirty Zerby / Puddle Too Deep (November 8, 2014)
11. Catching Some Zzzs / Sand Puddle / Don't Forget To Pack (November 15, 2014)
12. Flynn's Runway / Strut Gets Stuck / Main Street (November 22, 2014)
13. Water-Way / Tightest Turn / Chase Race (November 29, 2014)

=== Season 3 ===
1. Wheely, Wheely Big / Once Upon a Zerby / Follow the Dotty Line
2. A Bundle of Trouble / Fill's Big Scoop / Turn! Turn! Turn!
3. Sticking To It / Getting Nowhere Fast! / Zerby Fountain
4. Jake's Stakes / Leaf it to Dotty / Scree's Company
5. Hide and Go Dotty / Zerby Town Parade / Zerbapartments
6. Lily's Driveway / Beat The Heat / Wicked Winch
7. The Long and Winding Road / Come In Tower / Zerby Go Round
8. Bee, Hedgehog and Ghost / Hole Lotta Diggin' / Pinecone Peak
9. More Volume / Washed Away / Flynn Beneath My Wings
10. Zerby Bridges Falling Down / You've Got Some 'Splaining To Do / Chase Comes Unglued
11. Turbo, Set, Ready! / Gone with the Windsock / Let's Get Swinging
12. Zerby Pirates / Get Back On Track, Zack! / This Way or Zack Way
13. A Funny Thing Happened... / Flynn's Road / Think, Think Again
