= Dragon (TV series) =

- Created by: Dav Pilkey
- Based on: Dragon series by Dav Pilkey
- Written by: Steven Westren
- Story by: Anne-Marie Perrotta & Tean Schultz (only one episode)
- Directed by: Thomas Schneider-Trumpp; Sue-Wee Moon; Philip Marcus
- Creative director: Philip Marcus
- Voices of: Frank Meschkuleit
- Narrated by: Frank Meschkuleit
- Theme music composer: Raymond A. Fabi
- Opening theme: Dragon Theme Song (sung by Bill Riggenberg)
- Ending theme: Dragon Theme Song (Instrumental)
- Countries of origin: Canada; Germany
- Original language: English
- No. of seasons: 3
- No. of episodes: 78 (312 segments)

Production
- Executive producers: Vivianne Morin; Greg Dummett; Jan Bonath; Helmut Fischer; Lorraine Richard
- Producers: Greg Dummett; Wonman Chung; Lorraine Richard; Jan Bonath
- Animator: Peggy Arel
- Editor: François Massé
- Running time: 12 minutes (assorted episodes) 2-4 minutes (unassorted episodes)
- Production companies: Cité-Amérique; Scholastic; Scopas Medien; Image Plus; Sovik; ZDF Enterprises

Original release
- Network: Treehouse TV; ZDF (Germany)
- Release: September 6, 2004 – December 28, 2007

Dragon is a stop-motion clay animated children's television series based on the books by best-selling children's author Dav Pilkey. A total of 78 episodes were produced and broadcast on Treehouse TV.

== Characters ==
Frank Meschkuleit acts as the narrator and performs character voices.

- Dragon is the title character of the show, a friendly-naive dragon (a wingless dragon—resembling a dinosaur). Dragon giggles his way through life. No matter what happens, this jolly hero's glass is always half-full. Slightly awkward, with a giant toothy grin, Dragon is curious about everything and will follow his nose wherever it may lead him. Happy and helpful, he is always ready to lend a hand. Even when things get messy, Dragon plays it cool. If you take life one step a time, there's nothing to be afraid of. Nothing at all. He's very creative and has many new things that come to mind he would plan for himself and all his friends who love him.
- Cat is Dragon's cat. Unlike Dragon's other anthropomorphic friends, Cat is really just a typical cat. Dropping in from time to time, Cat will happily accompany Dragon for a while. But she'll only stick around as long as she's interested. And then, she's off in search of her own adventures. Satisfied and self-absorbed, Cat is highly fussy about her meals! She's not too concerned about the world around her and she loves to stretch out for long naps.
- Beaver is a busy and curious beaver. Beaver likes to keep busy. Most of the time, he's doing chores and rebuilding his home while he mutters and grumbles to himself. He repeats "Yes" and "No" a lot possibly because of his personality. For Beaver, life is no picnic. Beaver is always looking for a better and faster way of getting things done. Unfortunately, Beaver's shoddy workmanship usually has him working overtime. Curious and cantankerous, Beaver is constantly pondering how and why things are done the way they are.
- Mail Mouse is a mouse who is reliable and is bold. Mail Mouse loves her job and she's shown to be good at it. Sometimes, she hand delivers the mail, and at other times, she just leaves it at the mailbox. Either way, she's quick, reliable and a lot of fun. Opinionated and always willing to lend a helping hand, Mail Mouse is generous with her advice. She's bold without being pushy and that's just the way the others like her.
- Ostrich is an ostrich who runs a general store. Ostrich is a strange and wonderful bird. Ostrich is always busy with something. She has a head for business and manages her own general store. She can also be seen tidying the streets and clocking time as the village's physician. Ostrich tries very hard to be a superhero, and she is determined to rescue people, whether or not they need to be rescued. She has even developed her very own superhero yodel and dance.
- Alligator is a kooky and creative alligator. Alligator never worries about finding a solution. His only solution is never to worry. For Alligator, life is a journey and he's enjoying the ride! Kooky, creative and loved by all, Alligator even has his own lingo: "Hidy-ho, little blue dude!" which he says and calls Dragon. And there's one thing that Alligator loves more than anything else. He just cannot stop dancing, playing the bongos, and making noise.

== Episodes ==
Season	Episodes	Originally released	
Season	Episodes	First released	Last released
1	26	September 6, 2004	February 28, 2005
2	26	July 8, 2005	December 30, 2005
3	26	July 6, 2007	December 28, 2007

=== Season 1 (2004-2005) ===
- This season premiered in Canada on September 6, 2004, and in the United States on Qubo in September 2006.

No.	Title	Directed by	Written by	Original release date
1	"A Friend for Dragon "A Rocky Start" "At Home With Rock" "Like a Rock"	Thomas Schneider-Trumpp	Steven Westren	September 6, 2004
When none of Dragon's friends come over, Dragon interacts with a rock.
2	"Dragon's Fat Cat" "A Name for Cat" "Life with Cat" "Cat Comes Back"	Thomas Schneider-Trumpp	Steven Westren	September 13, 2004
Dragon adopts a cat when he sees her outside of his house.
3	"A Fly Arrives" "Fly Paper" "Fly See Fly Do" "Fly Goes Bye"	Thomas Schneider-Trumpp	Steven Westren	September 20, 2004
Dragon tries to get rid of an annoying fly.
4	"Dragon Needs a Holiday" "Dragon Plans His Trip" "Dragon Loads The Car" "Dragon Finally Goes Exploring"	Sue-Wee Moon	Steven Westren	September 27, 2004
Dragon decides to set up a holiday.
5	"Dragon's New Hobby" "Yodel Ooo Ohhh Oww" "Knit Picking" "Wooly for You"	Thomas Schneider-Trumpp	Torill Kove	October 4, 2004
Dragon tries some new hobbies other than collecting stamps. He eventually finds one he loves: knitting.
6	"Spring Cleaning" "Getting Started" "Team Work" "Clean as a Whistle"	Philip Marcus	Torill Kove	October 11, 2004
Dragon cleans his house for Spring, and Beaver helps.
7	"Mail-Dragon" "Dragon the Builder" "Swamp Dragon" "Super-Dragon"	Philip Marcus	Mark Leiren-Young	October 18, 2004
Dragon wonders what it would be like if he did the stuff his friends do.
8	"Dragon's Bogeyman" "The Monster Under the Bed" "The Sound Around Us" "Only the Shadow Knows..."	Sue-Wee Moon	Mark Leiren-Young	October 25, 2004
Dragon is worried that the Bogeyman is under his bed.
9	"One Pretty Leaf" "Two Pretty Leaves" "Leaf Me Alone" "Leaf It to Me"	Philip Marcus	Cathy Moss	November 1, 2004
A lovely leaf lands on Dragon's feet.
10	"Dragon's Night Light" "Moony About the Moon" "Fowl Moon" "No Moon So Soon?"	Sue-Wee Moon	Brian Stockton	November 8, 2004
Dragon has a fear of the moon shrinking.
11	"The Complaint" "Sherlock Dragon" "Quiet, Please!" "Zzzzzzzzz..."	Thomas Schneider-Trumpp	Steven Westren	November 15, 2004
Beaver keeps complaining about hearing a very annoying noise in the middle of the night.
12	"Ostrich to the Rescue" "Looking for Trouble" "Dragon's Helping Hand" "A Tiresome Tire"	Philip Marcus	Steven Westren	November 22, 2004
Ostrich tries to rescue someone, whether they need to be rescued or not.
13	"A Favor for Ostrich" "Watering Time!" "Still Watering Time!" "Fern's Farewell""	Thomas Schneider-Trumpp	Steven Westren	November 29, 2004
Dragon takes care of Ostrich's fern for her.
14	"Dragon's Snowy Day" "Making a Friend" "Snow Problem" "Dragon Figures It Out""	Sue-Wee Moon	Steven Westren	December 6, 2004
Dragon has some fun outside after it starts snowing.
15	"Bathtime" "Hide and Seek... and Seek" "Hide and Go Hide" "Rub-a-Dub-Dub"	Sue-Wee Moon	Aline Gilmore	December 13, 2004
Dragon tries to get Cat to take a bath, but he can't find her anywhere!
16	"The Perfect Christmas Tree" "The Candy Wreath" "Mittens" "Merry Christmas, Dragon!"	Thomas Schneider-Trumpp	Aline Gilmore	December 20, 2004
Dragon's getting into the festive spirit with all the holiday decorations, and is making a list so he doesn't forget anything for his friends!
17	"Cutting Through Clutter" "Sale Away" "Everything Must Stay!" "The Sale to End All Sales"	Sue-Wee Moon	Steven Westren	December 27, 2004
Dragon has a yard sale.
18	"Dragon's Mixed-Up Day" "A Sleepy Mixed-Up Day" "Snack Time" "Goodnight Dragon!"	Thomas Schneider-Trumpp	Greg Dummett and Steven Westren	January 3, 2005
Dragon has a mixed-up day after not being able to sleep.
19	"Scary Pumpkins" "The Scary Costume" "The Scary Party" "Scary Sounds"	Thomas Schneider-Trumpp	Aline Gilmore	January 10, 2005
Dragon wants a scary Halloween.
20	"Hurry Up and Wait" "Copycat" "Time's a Draggin'" "How Time Flies"	Sue-Wee Moon	Steven Westren	January 17, 2005
Dragon gets invited to a picnic.
21	"Dragon's Train" "House Training" "Out and About!" "Free at Last"	Sue-Wee Moon	Steven Westren	January 24, 2005
Dragon buys a toy train.
22	"Dragon's Surprise Party" "The Element of Surprise" "Party Time!" "Surprise, Surprise!"	Thomas Schneider-Trumpp	Steven Westren	January 31, 2005
Dragon throws a surprise birthday party.
23	"Dragon's Snuffly Day" "Getting Comfy" "A Little Help From His Friends" "Breezy Sneezes"	Philip Marcus	Steven Westren	February 7, 2005
Dragon has the sneezy snuffles and decides to take care of himself on his sofa.
24	"A Special Day" "A Little Song, A Little Dance" "Specializing" "Dragon's Day"	Thomas Schneider-Trumpp	Steven Westren	February 14, 2005
Dragon invents a day about himself when he finds out there's no special day for a dragon such as him.
25	"Bakin' Mad" "The Cookie Crumbles" "Bringin' Singing" "Love is All Around"	Thomas Schneider-Trumpp	Greg Dummett and Aline Gilmore	February 21, 2005
Dragon bakes cookies, mails cards and works on a little dance to go with his singing telegram for Valentine's Day.
26	"A Sore Toof" "A Persnickity Pearly" "A Tootlin' Tooth" "Losing a Loose Tooth"	Thomas Schneider-Trumpp	Greg Dummett and Steven Westren	February 28, 2005
Alligator has a toothache.

=== Season 2 (2005) ===
- The credits in this season are stacked.
- This season premiered in Canada on July 8, 2005.

No.	Title	Directed by	Written by	Original release date
1	"Dragon Helps Out "Shelf Life" "Dragon's First Customer" "Hats Off to Dragon"	Philip Marcus	Steven Westren	July 8, 2005
Dragon runs Ostrich's store for her while she goes home and tries to get better when she has a tummy ache.
2	"Setting Up Shop" "When Life Hands You a Lemon..." "Yes We Have No Lemonade" "You Can Lead a Mouse to Water..."	Thomas Schneider-Trumpp	Steven Westren	July 15, 2005
Dragon opens up a lemonade stand.
3	"A Big Bowl of Yuck" "Is the Sleepover Over?" "A While on the Smile" "Whistle While You Snork"	Sue-Wee Moon	Steven Westren	July 22, 2005
Dragon and Alligator have a sleepover.
4	"Ears to You" "Hop to It!" "Basket Case" "Scrambled Eggs"	Normand Rompré	Steven Westren	July 29, 2005
It's Dragon's turn to hide the Easter eggs for the yearly Easter egg hunt.
5	"Dragon's Tasty Apple" "The Out-of-Reach Apple" "The Ornery Apple" "Dragon Gets His Apple"	Philip Marcus	Heidi Foss	August 5, 2005
Dragon goes apple picking.
6	"Planting the Seed" "Farmer Dragon" "Growing Pains" "The Big Dinner"	Thomas Schneider-Trumpp	Steven Westren	August 12, 2005
Dragon grows a carrot.
7	"A Nice, Clean Blanket" "Gone with the Breeze" "It's Raining Blankets!" "Blowin' in the Wind"	Thomas Schneider-Trumpp	Heidi Foss	August 19, 2005
Dragon decides to wash Cat's blanket.
8	"The Invitation" "The Dragon Two-Step" "Shadow Dancing" "May I Have This Dance?"	Sue-Wee Moon	Anne-Marie Perrotta and Tean Schultz	August 26, 2005
Alligator invites Dragon over for a party at his house, and he comes up with a dance that his friends dance to at Alligator's party.
9	"A Song for Cat" "Party Planning" "Hush, Hush!" "Party Pooper"	Sue-Wee Moon	Steven Westren	September 2, 2005
Dragon tries to plan a surprise birthday party for cat. Alligator thinks of a song and Mail Mouse helps decide what cake Cat would like.
10	"Itch Marks the Spot" "Itch, Itch, Itch" "You Scratch My Back" "An Itchy Situation"	Axel Sucrow	Steven Westren	September 9, 2005
Dragon has an itch.
11	"Dragon's New Book" "An Open Book" "Story Time" "Dragon's Book Club"	Philip Marcus	Anne-Marie Perrotta and Tean Schultz	September 16, 2005
Dragon wants to know the ending of his new book, but he gets interrupted by his friends when they keep asking him to come outside.
12	"Some Assembly Required" "Wagon Rides" "Wagon Training" "Wagon Overload"	Sue-Wee Moon	Story by : Anne-Marie Perrotta and Tean Schultz; Teleplay by : Steven Westren	September 23, 2005
Dragon uses his new wagon to help his friends.
13	"Decisions, Decisions..." "Quality Time" "Toying with Toys" "The Box Rocks"	Thomas Schneider-Trumpp	Steven Westren	September 30, 2005
Dragon tries to decide which one of his toys he wants to play with.
14	"Can You Open a Can?" "Getting Inventing" "Friendly Inventions" "A Stroke of Genius"	Philip Marcus	Steven Westren	October 7, 2005
Dragon invents things after being admired by his can opener.
15	"Beaver's Boo Boo" "Dragon at Work" "The Fix is In" "Fixing the Fixes"	Sue-Wee Moon	Aline Gilmore	October 14, 2005
Dragon helps out with Beaver.
16	"Blue Mood, Blue Dude" "Turn That Frown Upside-Down" "Things Are Looking Up" "Trading Places"	Axel Sucrow	Steven Westren	October 21, 2005
Alligator is in a bad mood today. He finds out why he was in a bad mood: he didn't have the time to eat breakfast.
17	"Meow for the Camera" "Still Life with Dragon" "Say Cheese" "Say Cheese Cheese Cheese Cheese Cheese"	Philip Marcus	Steven Westren	October 28, 2005
Dragon decides to put together a picture book of his world.
18	"Postage Due" "To Whom It May Concern..." "Special Delivery" "Return to Sender"	Sue-Wee Moon	Heidi Foss	November 4, 2005
Dragon keeps a colorful stamp and starts collecting beautiful ones.
19	"Pussycat Serenade" "A Star is Born" "If Music Be the Food of Love" "The Big Show"	Philip Marcus	Steven Westren	November 11, 2005
Dragon decides to put on a show for his friends after he is pleased with his silly Cat song.
20	"Lack of a Racket" "A Little Reminder" "Don't Forget to Remember" "Hammer It Home"	Sue-Wee Moon	Cathy Moss	November 18, 2005
Dragon borrows Beaver's hammer.
21	"Wheely Wintery" "Sliding Slices" "A Slippery Slope" "Hill Thrills"	Sue-Wee Moon	Steven Westren	November 25, 2005
Dragon discovers it has snowed overnight, meaning it is a perfect day for him to go tobogganning!
22	"The Perfect Camping Spot" "Mellow Meadow" "Count Your Lucky Stars" "Happy Campers"	Axel Sucrow	Bernice Vanderlaan	December 2, 2005
Ostrich, Alligator, Beaver and Dragon go camping.
23	"Hoop Hopes" "Cat Mew-Sic" "Count on Me" "A Good Trick Indeed"	Philip Marcus	Bernice Vanderlaan	December 9, 2005
Dragon wants to teach Cat some new tricks.
24	"The Mystery Mystery" "The Case of the Heavy Mailbag" "The Case of the Missing Ostrich" "Without a Clue"	Thomas Schneider-Trumpp	Cathy Moss	December 16, 2005
After finding his own footprints all over his yard, Dragon decides to solve mysteries.
25	"Spring Has Sprung" "Hop to It!" "Hide and Sleep" "Mallet Ballet"	Thomas Schneider-Trumpp	Steven Westren	December 23, 2005
Dragon and his pals enjoy the return of the nice weather, and the gang play many fun outdoor activities.
26	"Best Foot Backwards "Quiet as a Dragon!" "Heave Ho!" "Simply the Best"	Thomas Schneider-Trumpp	Bernice Vanderlaan	December 30, 2005
Dragon tries to find something he is the best at doing.

=== Season 3 (2007) ===
- This season premiered in Canada on July 6, 2007.
- All episodes in this season are written by Steven Westren.

No.	Title	Directed by	Written by	Original release date
1	"Tuckered Tonsils" "Show and... Show" "Banana Appeal" "It Goes Without Saying"	Kyung-Il Hwang	Steven Westren	July 6, 2007
Dragon loses his voice after practicing his singing too much. Luckily for him however, he can still show his friends what he needs help doing!
2	"Mind Your Manners" "Table Manners" "The ABC's of Your P's and Q's" "Dainty Dining"	Philip Marcus	Steven Westren	July 13, 2007
Mail Mouse teaches Dragon his table manners.
3	"Say Ahhhhhh!" "House Call" "A Symphony of Sniffles" "Impatient Patients"	Kyung-Il Hwang	Steven Westren	July 20, 2007
Dragon helps his friends when they have the sniffles.
4	"On a Roll" "A Tiring Tire" "Getting the Hang of It" "A Roller's New Role"	Thomas Schneider-Trumpp	Steven Westren	July 27, 2007
Beaver's delighted to let Dragon use an old tire as a toy.
5	"Do Not Open Until..." "What Could It Be?" "The Guessing Game" "Open Sesame!"	Philip Marcus	Steven Westren	August 3, 2007
Dragon gets a package from his friends that he cannot open until it is his birthday.
6	"Winners and Losers" "A Win/Lose Situation" "Game for a Game" "Fools for Rules"	Thomas Schneider-Trumpp	Steven Westren	August 10, 2007
Alligator and Dragon playing winning and losing games don't seem to be working out. They make up a game without any winning or losing and Beaver and Mail Mouse play the game too.
7	"Where, Oh Where?" "A Hidden Talent" "A Treasure Map" "Dragon Measures His Treasure"	Philip Marcus	Steven Westren	August 17, 2007
The gang go on a treasure hunt.
8	"Picnic Nitpick" "Watch the Birdies" "Beaver Says... Zzzz..." "A Lack of Snacks"	Philip Marcus	Steven Westren	August 24, 2007
The gang have a picnic and play games.
9	"A Float on a Boat" "Scuba-Do" "Soon the Moon!" "A Busy Bus"	Kyung-Il Hwang	Steven Westren	August 31, 2007
Dragon finds things to do to keep him entertained on a rainy day.
10	"A Nice Surprise" "Giving Sand a Hand" "A Neighbour's Favour" "A Plant Aslant"	Philip Marcus	Steven Westren	September 7, 2007
Dragon does nice things for his friends.
11	"It Takes Skates" "Ice and Easy" "Amok with a Puck" "Think Rink"	Philip Marcus	Steven Westren	September 14, 2007
Dragon learns to ice-skate.
12	"Somethin' Pumpkin" "Dress-Up Dragon" "A Costume with a Peel" "Who's the Banana?"	Kyung-Il Hwang	Steven Westren	September 21, 2007
Dragon makes himself the best Halloween he ever could.
13	"Boxed In" "Thinking Out of the Box" "Putting Jack Back" "A Springy Thingy"	Kyung-il Hwang	Steven Westren	September 28, 2007
Dragon fixes Beaver's jack-in-the-box.
14	"Tale of a Snail" "Slip, Slip, Hooray!" "The Lack of Snacks" "A Slippery Assist!""	Philip Marcus	Steven Westren	October 5, 2007
There is a snail in the way, and Dragon isn't able to go to Ostrich's store.
15	"Surprise Supplies" "A Wise Surprise" "Surprise Tries!" "Dragon Applies the Surprise"	Thomas Schneider-Trumpp	Steven Westren	October 12, 2007
Dragon decides to surprise Ostrich.
16	"Meow Means Yeow" "Made in the Shade!" "A Hat for Cat" "Proud of His Cloud"	Thomas Schneider-Trumpp	Steven Westren	October 19, 2007
Dragon tries to give Cat a shady shelter.
17	"Join the Club!" "The Secret Word" "The Secret Handshake" "Flubs at the Club""	Thomas Schneider-Trumpp	Steven Westren	October 26, 2007
Dragon and Alligator come up with an idea: starting a best friends club.
18	"Let's Get Giggling!" "Willy-Nilly Silliness" "Sneakily Silly" "The Silliest of Them All!"	Kyung-il Hwang	Steven Westren	November 2, 2007
Dragon does funny things.
19	"Let's Make Music" "Tooting's a Hoot" "Thinkin' of Plinking" "A Hand for the Band"	Thomas Schneider-Trumpp	Steven Westren	November 9, 2007
Dragon wants to make music with his friends.
20	"The Travel Bug" "The One and Only" "A Test of the Best" "Best of All"	Kyung-il Hwang	Steven Westren	November 16, 2007
After seeing Mail Mouse with a travel magazine, Dragon wants to be a tourist and do all the things in Mail Mouse's magazine. He takes many pictures of his friends' things, and especially his friends.
21	"Upright at Night" "Make It Awake" "Snores Outdoors" Bedtime Shmed-Time"	Thomas Schneider-Trumpp	Steven Westren	November 23, 2007
Dragon tries to stay up past his bedtime to see a comet.
22	"Hay Day" "A Horse, of Course" "Bobbing for Pumpkins" "A Better Than Fair... Fair"	Thomas Schneider-Trumpp	Steven Westren	November 30, 2007
Dragon and the gang have a fall fair at Dragon's house.
23	"To the Rescue Too" "Sidekick Schtick" "Who to Rescue?" "The Dynamic Two to Help You!"	Thomas Schneider-Trumpp	Steven Westren	December 7, 2007
Dragon wants to be Ostrich's sidekick.
24	"Flipping Flapjacks" "Trickily Sticky" "Middle of the Griddle" "One Size Feeds All"	Philip Marcus	Steven Westren	December 14, 2007
Dragon makes a pancake breakfast for the gang.
25	"The Name Game" "What Sized Surprise?" "A Hat, What's What!" "Presenting... Presents"	Thomas Schneider-Trumpp	Steven Westren	December 21, 2007
Dragon and his friends play a game of whoever will be getting Christmas presents for somebody.
26	"Rise and Dine" "Moving House" "The Door? Which Floor!?" "Mailmouse, My House"	Philip Marcus	Steven Westren	December 28, 2007
Dragon moves his house furniture everywhere.

== Broadcast ==
Dragon premiered in Canada on Treehouse TV on September 6, 2004. The show aired various episodes until December 31, 2007, and continued with unaired episodes from January 1, 2008, to June 30, 2012. On September 9, 2006, the show aired on Qubo in the United States with the TV-Y rating and the E/I ident, and it aired on this channel as part of the channel launch and aired until September 12, 2009. It returned to Qubo and aired again from October 2, 2010, to February 12, 2012, and then returned for the third and final time on October 1, 2012, before being taken off the air once again on September 25, 2015. It has also been aired on ZDF in Germany, Rai in Italy, RTV in Slovenia, EBS in Korea (as 내 친구 드래곤 or My Friend Dragon), Disney Channel in Germany, KRO in the Netherlands, ABC Television in Australia, Cartoon Network in Latin America and SVT in Barnkanalen. The show aired on Knowledge Network in British Columbia, Canada from 2013 to 2022. The show is currently airing on Kids Street and Babyfirst in the US.
