= Frank Meschkuleit =

Canadian puppeteer and voice actor (born c. 1962)

- Born: 1962 (age 63–64); Toronto, Ontario, Canada
- Occupations: Voice actor, puppeteer, comedian
- Years active: 1979–present
- Known for: Toopy and Binoo
- Spouse: Dina Meschkuleit
- Children: Maya Meschkuleit

Frank Meschkuleit (born 1962) is a Canadian voice actor, puppeteer and comedian best known for his role as Toopy on the Canadian television series Toopy and Binoo.

== Early life ==
Meschkuleit was born in Toronto to Anna (née Apke) and Siegfried Meschkuleit, both German immigrants.

== Career ==
Meschkuleit began his performing career as a mime, and broke into puppeteering with an audition for the 1979 film The Muppet Movie and parts in Don't Eat the Neighbours and Dragon. He was also the suit performer for Junior Gorg in the fifth and final season of Fraggle Rock.

Meschkuleit performed a live comedy show called The Left Hand of Frank, which was a hit at the Edmonton International Fringe Festival in 1994. Meschkuleit performed the show for 12 years, ending in 2005.

== Personal life ==
Meschkuleit is married to Dina, with whom they have a daughter, Maya who is a professional rower.

== Selected filmography ==
- Fraggle Rock (1983–1987)
- Sesame Street Presents: Follow That Bird (1985)
- Blizzard Island (1987–1988)
- Basil Hears a Noise (1990)
- Chicken Minute (1990-1993)
- Iris, The Happy Professor (1992–1994)
- Little Star (1994-1997)
- Noddy (1998–2000)
- St. Bear's Dolls Hospital (1998-2000)
- Don't Eat the Neighbours (2001–2002)
- Dragon (2004–2007)
- Toopy and Binoo (2005–2006)
- The Mighty Jungle (2007-2008)
- Toopy and Binoo Vroom Vroom Zoom (2013)
- Now You Know (2015-2016)
- Fraggle Rock: Back to the Rock (2022)
- Toopy and Binoo: The Movie (2023)
- Toopy and Binoo: Fabulous Adventures (2025)
