= Paul Sutherland (TV producer) =

Canadian television producer (1930–2004)

- Born: December 7, 1930; Toronto, Ontario, Canada
- Died: May 15, 2004 (aged 73); Toronto, Ontario, Canada
- Education: Ryerson Institute of Technology
- Occupations: Producer, writer
- Years active: 1953–1990

Paul Sutherland (December 7, 1930 – May 15, 2004) was a Canadian producer and writer.

Sutherland was the co creator of "Tales of the Riverbank". He produced the first series with his partner David Ellison, in 1959. The series ran in 1959, in 1972 David Ellison made a second version, voiced for Canada by Paul. The last series was produced in Toronto for YTV (Canadian TV channel). The title "Once Upon a Hamster" was used for the latest version, 65 episodes were produced from 1995 to 1998. The series is still available for worldwide distribution through Echo Bridge, Boston.

He was also writer of a short film "The Scribe" featuring Buster Keaton. Keaton's last film appearance.

Sutherland graduated from the Ryerson Institute of Technology for Film and Television in 1953 after completing one year at the University of Toronto in Chemical Engineering. After a number of years editing with the Canadian Broadcasting Corporation (CBC) and then producing the first series of Tales of the Riverbank, Paul worked as a copy writer/producer for Foster Advertising and then as video producer with the communications department of IBM Canada for 18 years, prior to his retirement in 1990.

He was heavily involved in the "Once Upon a Hamster" series; he served in the many capacities, including: Creator, Producer, Director, Script, Storyman (voice), Hammy (voice), Other animals (voice), Second Unit Operator, Supervising Editor and Wrangler

Sutherland died of a heart attack, at age 73.
