= Patty Sullivan =

Canadian television presenter and actress

- Born: Patricia Sullivan; March 17, 1968 (age 58); Burlington, Ontario
- Education: Ryerson Polytechnical Institute (now Toronto Metropolitan University)
- Spouse: Michael Kinney
- Children: 2
- Presenting career
- Country: Canada
- Previous shows: TVOKids, Kids' CBC
- Website: thepattysullivan.com

Patricia Sullivan (born March 17, 1968) is a Canadian television presenter and actress. She is best known for hosting the TVOKids programming block on TVOntario from 1994 to 2003 and the Kids' CBC block on CBC Television from 2003 to 2016, and returned to host the CBC Kids block in 2025.

== Career ==
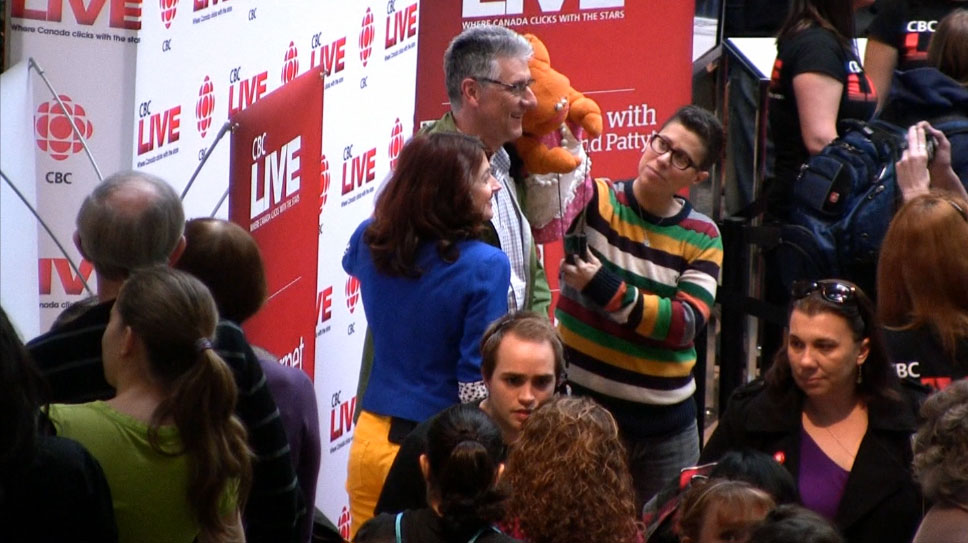
Sullivan (in blue) with her puppet "co-host" Mamma Yamma and Mamma Yama's puppeteer Ali Eisner (in striped shirt).

Following her graduation from the radio and television arts program at Ryerson Polytechnical Institute (now Toronto Metropolitan University) in 1990, Sullivan initially pursued a career in news radio journalism before joining the provincial public broadcaster TVOntario (TVO).

After responding to an internal job posting for a children's television host, Sullivan began hosting the TVOKids programming block on TVO in 1994. She was part of the TVOKids production team that won an International Emmy Award for their 1995 International Children's Day of Broadcasting programming. She was dismissed from TVO in 2003 due to an alleged conflict of interest related to her hosting Animal Magnetism, a nature documentary series on the W Network, which aired concurrently with her TVOKids programming block. She later received an unspecified settlement from TVO.

Five months after leaving TVO, Sullivan was hired by the Canadian Broadcasting Corporation as a host for the newly reformatted Kids' CBC programming block on CBC Television. In June 2016, CBC announced that Sullivan would be departing as host as part of a new reformatting of Kids' CBC. She is scheduled to return to host the CBC Kids block in the fall of 2025.

== Personal life ==
Sullivan lives in Toronto with her husband Michael Kinney and two daughters.

== Filmography ==
=== TV ===
- TVOKids (1994-2003) - Host
- The Last Don II (1998) - Southern California Reporter #1
- The Reading Rangers (2001) - Ranger Patty, Abel Johnson, Teeny
- Animal Magnetism (2003-2004) - Host
- Kids' CBC (2003–2016) - Host
- Murdoch Mysteries (2016) - Shop girl
- Conviction (2017) - Reese Barnes
- Mittens & Pants (2022–present)
- Hey Joojo! (2025) - Host
