= CBC Kids =

Canadian TV programming block for children on CBC

- Logo used between 2003 and 2017
- Network: CBC Television
- Launched: 1987; 39 years ago
- Country of origin: Canada
- Formerly known as: Hodge Podge Lodge (1987–1992); CBC Playground (1994–2000); Children's CBC (1997–1998); Get Set for Life (2000–2003)
- Format: Children's programming
- Running time: Weekdays: 7:00–11:00 a.m.; Saturdays: 6:00 a.m. – noon; Sundays: 6:00–8:00 a.m.
- Official website: https://www.cbc.ca/kids/

CBC Kids (formerly known as Hodge Podge Lodge, CBC Playground, Children's CBC, Get Set for Life on CBC) is a block of programming on CBC Television in Canada. The block was launched as Hodge Podge Lodge in 1987 and contains programming targeted at children. The block airs on weekdays from 7:00 a.m. to 11:00 a.m., Saturdays from 6:00 a.m. to noon, and Sundays from 6:00 a.m. to 8:00 a.m.

Its French-language counterpart is Zone Jeunesse on ICI Radio-Canada Télé, which airs on weekdays from 5:00 a.m. to 9:00 a.m., Saturdays from 6:00 a.m. to 11:00 a.m. and Sundays from 6:00 a.m. to 10:00 a.m.

== History ==
=== Hodge Podge Lodge (1987–1994) ===
From 1987 to 1992, the CBC's two-hour morning block of children's programs was called Hodge Podge Lodge (not to be confused with the earlier American series of the same name). The CBC's afternoon children's programs during this time were presented under generic CBC branding instead. CBC Children's Publicist Barbara Chernin and Producer Stephen Wrigh came up with the name "Hodge Podge Lodge", which was approved by Angela Bruce, head of CBC Children's Programming. The Hodge Podge Lodge interstitials featured animated multi-coloured geometric shapes, art supplies, and blocks moving around to music.

Following the CBC's rebrand in November 1992, the Hodge Podge Lodge interstitials were replaced with new ones featuring a group of animated animals. A new character was introduced and a contest was held to name the character.

=== CBC Playground (1994–2000) ===
Former theatre director Peter Moss became the CBC's head of children's programming in 1993, and the following winter, the CRTC complained about the CBC's lack of children's programming and presence of U.S. shows on weekday afternoons. On October 24, 1994, the lineup was renamed CBC Playground; the block expanded to 9:30 a.m. with a half-hour block of children's series from around the world. European series requiring narration were recorded in Toronto with the voices of Martha Henry, Colm Feore and Albert Schultz. The CBC said all programs between 9:30 a.m. and 11:00 a.m. would be Canadian within two years, as twelve shows for the block's first half-hour went into development.

In 1998, Adrian Mills became the CBC's new head of daytime programming, and CBC Playground was relaunched and expanded by an hour. Two presenters, Lisa Richardson and Drew Carnwath, were added to the block, and virtual sets began to be used. The CBC became a partner in the Get Set For Life campaign, which aimed to share information on development in preschoolers, alongside non-profit parenting organization Invest in Kids and Canadian Living magazine. CBC Playground's "Parenting with the Zap Family" interstitials were produced as part of the campaign.

=== Get Set For Life (2000–2003) ===
In 2000, CBC Playground was replaced with Get Set For Life, a block named after the campaign of the same name. This iteration had Alyson Court and Michael Clarke as its hosts.

By 2002, Cheryl Hassen had replaced Mills as the CBC's head of children's programming.

=== Kids CBC (2003–2017) ===
Kids CBC replaced Get Set For Life in 2003. While Court and Clarke initially remained, the main focus was on five regional hosts from various parts of Canada. The hosts were Patty Sullivan (Ontario), Joyce Quansah (Quebec), Kush Uppal (British Columbia/Western Canada), Hayley Gene (Manitoba/Prairies), and Dashi Malone (Newfoundland and Labrador/Atlantic Canada). The look and the studio sets were also drastically changed. The girl seen in the Get Set For Life logo was redesigned into an animated girl named Dot. Malone and Gene were later replaced by Mark O'Brien and Holly Bernier, respectively.

In 2005, a new set featuring a garden within a geometric dome replaced the previous animated interstitials in which the presenters would appear.

In 2007, the garden set was removed and a new series of interstitals titled Kids' Canada were introduced. Due to budget constraints, Quansah, Uppal, Bernier, and O'Brien were removed, and hosting was centralized in Toronto with Sullivan and Sid Bobb. The block also adopted a new theme song, "When the Night Feels My Song" by Bedouin Soundclash. The new interstitials featured Sullivan and Bobb interacting with characters that each represented a different region of Canada. Mamma Yamma, one of the puppets, frequently hosted cameos from celebrities such as musicians or television personalities; a compilation album of live performances, Mamma Yamma and Friends, was released in 2008. Joel Plaskett appeared on this segment in 2012, performing a rewritten version of his song "Fashionable People" about children playing dress-up. Plaskett performed this version of the song in concert on one occasion.

In 2013, Kids' CBC underwent another stylistic change, removing all of the characters except for Mamma Yamma. A new theme song, "You and Me and Kids' CBC", was also introduced.

=== CBC Kids (2017–present) ===
In January 2017, Kids' CBC was rebranded as CBC Kids, removing Sullivan, Bobb, and Mamma Yamma. This rebrand introduced new human hosts Janaye Upshaw, Tony Kim, and Victor Verbitsky, as well as several new puppet characters: Gary the Unicorn, Cottonball the Cat, Mr. Orlando the Moose, Makeup Monster (later renamed Mosey Monster), and Putter the Question Machine. The block's format blended children's programming with live-action interstitials featuring the human hosts and the puppet characters, called The Studio K Show. Verbitsky departed in 2018.

In 2023, Gary's Magic Fort was launched as a spin-off of The Studio K Show. This series featured Gary the Unicorn, and the new puppets Stuffy the Dog, Sir Cushington the Cushion, and Huggles the Backrest Pillow Bed. Upshaw and Kim made guest appearances in this series.

In 2024, Mercedes Gaztambide was added as a temporary host.

In 2025, a new host, Joojo Paintsil, was added to the block. Paintsil and the puppet characters were all blended in to a new interstitial series called Hey Joojo!, which revolves around Gary the Unicorn moving into his cousin Joojo's apartment while starting kindergarten. Previous segments featuring Kim and Upshaw still appear on the block, albeit less frequently. Guest appearances on Hey Joojo!, thus far, have included Mike Myers and Patty Sullivan, the latter of whom played Gary's kindergarten teacher, Miss Patty. That same year, CBC launched a streaming channel with 24/7 commercial-free CBC Kids programming, available to stream on CBC Gem and the CBC Kids YouTube channel.
