= 19th Gemini Awards =

2004 awards for Canadian television

- Date: December 13, 2004
- Venue: John Bassett Theatre, Toronto

Television/radio coverage
- Network: CBC Television

The Academy of Canadian Cinema & Television's 19th Gemini Awards were held on December 13, 2004, to honour achievements in Canadian television. The awards show, which was co-hosted by several celebrities, took place at the John Bassett Theatre and was broadcast on CBC Television.

== Best Dramatic Series ==
- Da Vinci’s Inquest – Haddock Entertainment, Barna-Alper Productions, Alliance Atlantis Productions, Canadian Broadcasting Corporation. Producers: Chris Haddock, Laszlo Barna, Arvi Liimatainen
- Bliss – Galafilm, Back Alley Film Productions. Producers: Arnie Gelbart, Janis Lundman, Ian Whitehead, Adrienne Mitchell
- The Eleventh Hour – Alliance Atlantis Communications. Producers: Ilana Frank, Semi Chellas, Ray Sager, David Wellington, Seaton McLean
- Slings & Arrows – Rhombus Media. Producers: Sari Friedland, Niv Fichman, Daniel Iron
- Snakes and Ladders – Big Motion Pictures. Producers: Wayne Grigsby, David MacLeod
- The Shields Stories – Shaftesbury Films. Producers: Christina Jennings, Scott Garvie, Kim Todd, Laura Harbin, Lori Spring

== Best Dramatic Mini-Series or TV Movie ==
- Human Cargo – Force Four Entertainment. Producers: Hugh Beard, Debra Beard, Brian Mckeown, Linda Svendsen
- Cowboys and Indians: The J.J. Harper Story – High Definition Pictures, The Film Works, Aboriginal Peoples Television Network, Canadian Broadcasting Corporation. Producers: Eric Jordan, Jeremy Torrie
- Elizabeth Rex – Rhombus Media. Producers: Jennifer Jonas, Niv Fichman, Daniel Iron
- Open Heart – Barna-Alper/Dreamsmith Entertainment, Movie Central, Canadian Broadcasting Corporation. Producers: Laszlo Barna, Phyllis Platt, Tim Hogan, Brian Dennis
- The Incredible Mrs. Ritchie – Showtime Networks, Nomadic Pictures. Producers: Chad Oakes, Michael Frislev

== Best Comedy Program or Series ==
- Trailer Park Boys – Showcase, Topsail Entertainment. Producers: Mike Clattenburg, Michael A. Volpe, Barrie Dunn
- Puppets Who Kill – Eggplant Picture & Sound. Producers: John Pattison, Marianne Culbert, John Leitch, Shawn Thompson
- This Hour Has 22 Minutes – Salter Street Films, Canadian Broadcasting Corporation. Producers: Michael Donovan, Geoff D’Eon, Mark Farrell, Jack Kellum, Susan MacDonald, Jenipher Ritchie
- The Newsroom – 100% Film and Television, Canadian Broadcasting Corporation, Showcase, Telefilm Canada. Producers: Ken Finkleman, Jan Peter Meyboom
- Corner Gas – CTV Television Network, Prairie Pants Productions. Producers: Brent Butt, Mark Farrell, David Storey, Virginia Thompson
- The Red Green Show – Red Green Productions. Producers: David C. Smith, Steve Smith

== Best Music, Variety Program or Series ==
- Juno Awards of 2004 – Canadian Academy of Recording Arts and Sciences, CTV Television Network. Producers: John Brunton, Melanie Berry, Barbara Bowlby, Lindsay Cox, Stephen Stohn, Louise Wood
- Live at the Rehearsal Hall – Bravo!. Producers: Robert Benson, John Gunn
- 2003 Much Music Video Music Awards – MuchMusic. Producers: John Kampilis, Sheila Sullivan
- ZeD – Canadian Broadcasting Corporation. Producers: McLean Mashingaidze-Greaves, Sudha Krishna, Jennifer Ouano
- Painting Daisies – The Dream Team – Canadian Broadcasting Corporation. Producers: Peter Mann, Steve Glassman, Jack Bond

== Best Performing Arts Program or Series, or Arts Documentary Program or Series ==
- Men of the Deeps – CTV Television Network, John Walker Productions, Picture Plant, National Film Board of Canada. Producers: John Walker, Terry Greenlaw, Kent Martin
- Amelia – Amérimage-Spectra, Media Principia, Echo Media. Producers: Pierre Touchette, Luc Châtelain, Bob Krupinski, Daniel Langlois, Alain Simard
- Singing in the Shadow: The Children of Rock Royalty – Handel Productions. Producer: Alan Handel
- Naked in the House – Fashion Television. Producers: Marcia Martin, Jay Levine, Adrienne Reid
- The Planets – Amérimage-Spectra, Echo Media. Producers: Pierre Touchette, Luc Châtelain, Alain Simard

== Best Talk Series ==
- Vicki Gabereau – Canadian Broadcasting Corporation. Producers: Cynthia Ott, Jordan Schwartz
- Studio 2 – TVOntario. Producers: Doug Grant, Jane Jankovic
- Imprint – TVOntario. Producers: Doug Grant, Linda Dunlop
- Hot Type – CBC Newsworld. Producers: Alice Hopton, Dana Glassman, Janet Thomson, Donna Lee Aprile
- CBC News: Sunday – Canadian Broadcasting Corporation. Producers: Stuart Coxe, Carolyn Jack

== Best Reality Program or Series ==
- CBC News: Disclosure – The Making of a Political Animal – Canadian Broadcasting Corporation. Producers: Catherine Legge, Jane Mingay, Cecil Rosner, Jim Williamson
- Venture – Back to the Floor – Canadian Broadcasting Corporation. Producers: Patsy Pehleman, Chad Paulin, Tracie Tighe
- Hooked Up – Lone Eagle Entertainment. Producers: Michael Geddes, Michael Frislev, Chad Oakes, Maria Pimentel, Tom Powers
- Kenny vs. Spenny – Canadian Broadcasting Corporation, Cinefornia, Blueprint Entertainment, Eggplant Picture & Sound, KVS Productions. Producers: Abby Finer, Noreen Halpern, Kenny Hotz, Ira Levy, John Morayniss, Spencer Rice, Kirsten Scollie, Peter Williamson
- Zoo Diaries – DocuTainment Productions, Microtainment Plus International, Infinite Monkeys Productions, Atlantic 16 Productions. Producers: Garry Blue, Howard Bernstein, Mark Shekter
- Buy Me – Whalley-Abbey Media. Producers: Nikila Cole, Hans Rosenstein

== Donald Brittain Award for Best Social/Political Documentary Program ==
- Dying at Grace – TVOntario. Producers: Rudy Buttignol, Allan King
- CBC News: Sunday – Deadline Iraq: Uncensored – Canadian Broadcasting Corporation. Producers: Aaron Williams, Eric Foss, Douglas Arrowsmith, Greg Kelly, Stuart Coxe
- Dying To Be Free – Zimbabwe's Struggle For Change. Producer: David Belluz
- Short Infinity – National Film Board of Canada. Producers: Yves Bisaillon, Jean Lemire
- The Man Who Could Be King – Nomad Films. Producers: Nancy Ing-Duclos, Edith Champagne, Mark Johnston

== Best Documentary Series ==
- The Nature of Things – Canadian Broadcasting Corporation. Producer: Michael Allder
- Rough Cuts – CBC Newsworld. Producer: Andrew Johnson
- The View from Here – TVOntario). Producer: Rudy Buttignol
- The Passionate Eye – The Passionate Eye Canadian Showcase – Canadian Broadcast Corporation. Producers: Catherine Olsen, Charlotte Odele, Diane Rotteau
- Turning Points of History – Barna-Alper Productions, Connections Productions. Producers: Laszlo Barna, Alan Mendelsohn

== Best History Documentary Program ==
- Radio Revolution: The Rise and Fall of the Big 8 – Markham Street Films. Producers: Judy Holm, Michael McNamara
- City of Ruins: The Halifax Explosion – Canadian Broadcasting Corporation. Producers: Mark Starowicz, Alan Mendelsohn, Sally Reardon
- Sleeping Tigers: The Asahi Baseball Story – National Film Board of Canada. Producers: Karen King, Silva Basmajian
- From a Place Called War 1939–1945: Dawn of Deliverance – Northern Sky Entertainment. Producer: Wayne Abbott
- Notman's Canada – TVOntario. Producers: Rudy Buttignol, Murray Battle, Andrea Nemtin

== Best Biography Documentary Program ==
- Arctic Dreamer: The Lonely Quest Stories of the War of Vilhjalmur Stefansson – National Film Board of Canada, White Pine Pictures. Producers: Lindalee Tracey, Peter Raymont.
- Helen's War: Portrait of a Dissident – Sonja Armstrong Productions. Producer: Sonja Armstrong, Anne Pick
- Turning Points of History – Neighbours: Freud and Hitler in Vienna – Barna-Alper Productions, Connections Productions. Producers: Alan Mendelsohn, Laszlo Barna
- The Canadian Experience: Sisters in the Wilderness – Canadian Broadcasting Corporation, CineNorth. Producers: Lisa Ellenwood, Susan Dando.
- The Spirit of Annie Mae – National Film Board of Canada. Producer: Kent Martin

== Best Science, Technology, Nature, Environment or Adventure Documentary Program ==
- Suzuki Speaks – Avanti Pictures. Producers: Cathy Chilco, Tony Papa
- Sex, Drugs and Middle Age – Canadian Broadcasting Corporation. Producer: Ann Marie Redmond
- The Nature of Things – Corporate Agriculture: The Hollow Men – Canadian Broadcasting Corporation. Producers: Michael Allder, Ray Burley
- The Eye of the Son – TVOntario. Producers: Rudy Buttignol, Jason Rodi, Robbie Hart
- Garden Mimics – Bullfrog Films. Producer: Susan Fleming

== Best News Information Series ==
- the fifth estate – Canadian Broadcasting Corporation. Producers: David Studer, Sally Reardon
- W5 – CTV Television Network. Producers: Malcolm Fox, Anton Koschany
- CTV National News – Question Period – CTV Television Network. Producers: Jana Juginovic, Joanne MacDonald
- Foreign Assignment – CBC Newsworld. Producers: Eric Rankin, Jet Belgraver
- The Docket – CBC News. Producers: Lisa Taylor, Susan Rogers

== Best News Magazine Segment ==
- The National/CBC News – Hana's Suitcase – Canadian Broadcasting Corporation. Producers: Joe Schlesinger, Jet Belgraver, Avi Lev
- CBC News: Sunday – Canadian Broadcasting Corporation. Producers: Eric Foss, Evan Solomon, Katie MacGuire, Aaron Williams
- CBC News: Disclosure – Dead Silence – Canadian Broadcasting Corporation. Producers: Harvey Cashore, Scott Anderson, Vera-Lynn Kubinec
- W5 – 419 Fraud – CTV Television Network. Producers: Tom Clark, Elizabeth Cook, Robert Osborne, Denis Langlois
- The National/CBC News – Uganda's Forgotten War – Canadian Broadcasting Corporation. Producers: Melanie Verhaeghe, Jamie Hopkins, Tania White

== Best Newscast ==
- CityNews: CityPulse at Six – Citytv. Producers: Katia Del Col, Dan Comi, Tina Cortese, Stephen Hurlbut
- The National/CBC News – Canadian Broadcasting Corporation. Producers: Bob Waller, Fred Parker, Mark Harrison, Lynn Kelly, Jonathan Whitten
- CTV National News – CTV Television Network. Producers: Wendy Freeman, Tom Haberstroh, David Hughes

== Best News Special Event Coverage ==
- CBC News: The 2010 Olympic Decision – Canadian Broadcasting Corporation. Producers: Mark Bulgutch, Fred Parker, Tom Dinsmore
- Global National – Kelowna Fires – Global News. Producers: George Browne, Doriana Temolo, Kevin Newman, Elaine McKay, Erin Lawrence
- CBC News: The Progressive Conservative Leadership Convention – Canadian Broadcasting Corporation. Producers: Mark Bulgutch, Fred Parker
- CTV News – Power Blackout – CTV Television Network. Producers: Kenton Boston, Tom Haberstroh, Brian LeBold
- Toronto Tonight: The Cecilia Tragedy – Producers: Mike Karapita, Zev Shalev

== Best Lifestyle or General Interest Series ==
- SexTV – CHUM Television, Corus Entertainment. Producers: Pedro Orrego, Marcia Martin
- Debbie Travis' Facelift – Whalley-Abbey Media. Producers: Nikila Cole, Debbie Travis, Hans Rosenstein
- Recreating Eden – Merit Motion Pictures. Producer: Merit Jensen-Carr
- Saturday Night at the Movies – The Interviews – TVOntario. Producers: Rudy Buttignol, Risa Shuman, Murray Battle
- English Teachers, Part 2 – WestWind Pictures. Producers: David C. Hansen, Clark Donnelly, Michael Snook, Maria Spinarski
- FashionTelevision – Citytv. Producers: Marcia Martin, Jay Levine, Howard Brull

== Best Lifestyle/Practical Information Segment ==
- ZeD – More Than Skin Deep – Canadian Broadcasting Corporation. Producers: Grant Greschuk, Scott Winlaw, David Ozier
- Marketplace – Canadian Broadcasting Corporation. Producers: Krista Erickson, Andreas Wesley, Don Chung, Aileen McBride, Blair Clark
- POV Sports – Canadian Broadcasting Corporation. Producer: Andrea Griffith
- Planet Parent – Telefactory. Producers: Derek Miller, Vanessa Huang, Jessy Tse, Jerry Vienneau, Denis Langlois

== Best Practical Information Series ==
- The Surreal Gourmet – Salad Daze Productions. Producers: Lon J. Hall, Dale Burshtein, Beth Fanjoy
- Holmes on Homes – General Purpose Entertainment. Producer: Scott Clark McNeil
- Licence to Grill – Knight Enterprises. Producers: Chris Knight, Kathy Doherty
- Me, My House & I – Mountain Road Productions. Producers: Tim Alp, Brigitte Gall
- Stylin' Gypsies – W Network. Producers: Michelle Metivier, Paula Butorac, Mary Benadiba

== Best Animated Program or Series ==
- Doodlez – Cellar Door Productions. Producer: Gretha Rose
- Fair Phyllis – National Film Board of Canada. Producers: Jennifer Torrance, Jerry Krepakevich
- King – Decode Entertainment, Funbag Animation Studios. Producers: Steve Denure, Gordon Coulthart, Beth Stevenson, Frank Taylor
- Miss Spider's Sunny Patch Kids – Nelvana. Producers: Scott Dyer, Nicholas Callaway, Michael Hirsh, David Kirk, Paul W. Robertson, Nadine van der Velde
- Noël Noël – National Film Board of Canada. Producers: Marc Bertrand, Marcy Page, Jean-Jacques Leduc

== Best Pre-School Program or Series ==
- Poko – Halifax Film Company. Producers: Michael Donovan, Charles Bishop, Jeff Rosen
- The Save-Ums! – C.O.R.E., Decode Entertainment. Producers: Kym Hyde, Neil Court, Steve Denure, Beth Stevenson, John Mariella
- Nanalan' – The Grogs, Lenz Entertainment. Producers: Jason Hopley, Jack Lenz, Jamie Shannon
- The Hoobs – The Jim Henson Company, Decode Entertainment. Producers: Mellie Buse, Angus Fletcher, Steve Denure, Beth Stevenson, Peter Coogan, Sue Taylor
- The Berenstain Bears – Nelvana, AGOGO Entertainment. Producers: Scott Dyer, Stan and Jan Berenstain, Michael Hirsh, Steven Ching
- The Big Comfy Couch – Radical Sheep Productions. Producers: Cheryl Wagner, John Leitch, Rob Mills

== Best Children’s or Youth Fiction Program or Series ==
- Degrassi: The Next Generation – Bell Media, Epitome Pictures. Producers: Stephen Stohn, Linda Schuyler
- Edgemont – Canadian Broadcasting Corporation, Omnifilm Entertainment. Producers: Michael Chechik, Ian Weir
- Strange Days at Blake Holsey High – Fireworks Entertainment. Producers: Tony Thatcher, Adam Haight, Jeff F. King, Kevin May
- Jacob Two-Two – Nelvana, Salter Street Films. Producers: Scott Dyer, Peter Moss, Michael Hirsh
- Radio Free Roscoe – Decode Entertainment. Producers: Steve Denure, Neil Court, John Delmage, Doug McRobb, Will McRobb, Brent Piaskoski, Beth Stevenson

== Best Children's or Youth Non-Fiction Program or Series ==
- Swap TV – Breakthrough Entertainment. Producers: Tatyana Terzopoulos, Ira Levy, Kirsty Nordal, Kirsten Scollie, Heather Findlay, Peter Williamson
- 21c – CTV Television Network. Producers: Malcolm Fox, Stephen Grant
- POV Sports – Canadian Broadcasting Corporation. Producers: Paul Papadopoulos, Christopher Greaves
- Street Cents – Canadian Broadcasting Corporation. Producers: Barbara Kennedy, Wendy Purves
- VOX – TVOntario. Producer: Maria Farano, Pat Ellingson

== Best Sports Program or Series ==
- Hockey Night in Canada, Hockey Day in Canada – CBC Sports. Producers: Joel Darling, Chris Irwin, Sherali Najak
- Life and Times – Destiny: The Life and Times of Daniel Igali – Canadian Broadcasting Corporation. Producers: Joel Gordon, Gabriela Schonbach, Michael Chechik
- NHL on TSN – Pre-Game – TSN. Producers: David Stiff, Ken Volden, Mark Milliere
- Spruce Meadows Horse Diaries: 2003 World Cup Finals – Spruce Meadows Ltd. Producers: Linda Southern-Heathcott, Ian M. Allison
- Roger Neilson: A Tribute – Sportsnet. Producer: David Tredgett

== Best Live Sporting Event ==
- 2003 UCI Road World Championships – Elite Men's Final – CBC Sports. Producers: Don Peppin, Jeff Pearlman
- CFL on CBC: 91st Grey Cup Championship – CBC Sports. Producers: Mike Brannagan, Trevor Pilling, Joe Scarcelli
- CFL : Wendy's Friday Night Football – Saskatchewan at Hamilton – TSN. Producer: Paul McLean

== Best Interactive ==
- Time Trackers Interactive Website – TVOntario. Producers: Pat Ellingson, Marney Malabar, Phil McCordic, Jeremy Rodgers, Andrew Ebert, Mike Fitzgerald, Catherine Thomson, Angela Lee
- Degrassi: The Next Generation – Bell Media, Epitome Pictures). Producers: Stephen Stohn, Linda Schuyler, Roma Khanna, Raja Khanna
- Chilly Beach: www.chillybeach.com featuring Polar Magnate – March Entertainment. Producers: Daniel Hawes, Don Hutchison, Craig McKee, Ronald Ruslim
- Canadian Idol: idol.ctv.ca – Insight Productions, 19 Entertainment, FremantleMedia North America. Producers: Aaron Bernardo, Noelle Paredes, Wendy Smith
- Deafplanet: deafplanet.com – Marblemedia, Canadian Cultural Society of the Deaf. Producers: Mark J.W. Bishop, Matthew Hornburg

== Best Direction in a Dramatic Program or Mini-Series ==
- Brad Turner – Human Cargo (Force Four Entertainment)
- Norma Bailey – Cowboys and Indians: The J.J. Harper Story (High Definition Pictures/The Film Works/APTN/CBC)
- Bruce Pittman – Shattered City: The Halifax Explosion (CBC Television)
- Anne Wheeler – The Investigation (CTV/Muse Entertainment/Studio Eight Productions/Voice Pictures)

== Best Direction in a Dramatic Series ==
- Sturla Gunnarsson – Da Vinci’s Inquest – Bury My Own Bones (Haddock Entertainment/Barna-Alper Productions/Alliance Atlantis/CBC)
- George Mihalka – Da Vinci’s Inquest – A Man When He's Down (Haddock Entertainment/Barna-Alper Productions/Alliance Atlantis/CBC)
- Kari Skogland – The Eleventh Hour – Swimmers (Alliance Atlantis)
- Bruce McDonald – This Is Wonderland – Episode 1 (Muse Entertainment/Indian Grove Productions)
- Scott Smith – This Is Wonderland – Episode 10 (Muse Entertainment/Indian Grove Productions)

== Best Direction in a News Information Program or Series ==
- Michael Gruzuk – Marketplace – Grand Theft Auto (CBC)
- Catherine Legge – CBC News: Disclosure – Download This! (CBC)
- Marie Caloz – the fifth estate – No Way Home (CBC)
- Neil Docherty – the fifth estate – Dead in the Water (CBC)
- Claude Vickery – the fifth estate – Run For Your Life (CBC)

== Best Direction in a Documentary Program ==
- Peter Raymont – The World Stopped Watching (Harold Crooks/White Pine Pictures)
- Allan King – Dying at Grace (TVOntario)
- John Walker – Men of the Deeps (CTV/John Walker Productions/Picture Plant/NFB)
- Kun Chang – Short Infinity (NFB)
- Sarah Goodman – Army of One (Fovea Films/Red Storm Productions)

== Best Direction in a Documentary Series ==
- Caroline Underwood – The Nature of Things – Arctic Mission (CBC)
- Tim Wolochatiuk – Betrayal! (American World Pictures/Gryphon Films)
- Chris Triffo – ExtraOrdinary Lives (Wavelength Entertainment)
- Gary Lang – Forensic Factor – Future Crime (Exploration Production)
- Leslie Côté – Stories of Mothers and Daughters (Breakthrough Entertainment)

== Best Direction in a Comedy Program or Series ==
- Shawn Thompson – Puppets Who Kill – Rocko Gets a Lung (Eggplant Picture & Sound)
- Henry Sarwer-Foner – This Hour Has 22 Minutes – Episode 1 (Salter Street Films/CBC)
- Mike Clattenburg – Trailer Park Boys – Closer to the Heart (Showcase/Topsail Entertainment)
- Shawn Thompson – An American in Canada – Some Like It Hot Zone (S&S Productions/CBC)
- Rob W. King – Corner Gas – Cousin Carl (CTV/Prairie Pants Productions)

== Best Direction in a Variety Program or Series ==
- Shelagh O'Brien – East Coast Music Awards (East Coast Music Association/CBC Halifax)
- Joan Tosoni – Juno Awards of 2004 (Canadian Academy of Recording Arts and Sciences/CTV)
- Bob Haller – 2003 MuchMusic Video Awards (MuchMusic)
- Mark Lawrence – ZeD (CBC)
- Geoff D'Eon – Christmas in Kabul (Salter Street Films)

== Best Direction in a Performing Arts Program or Series ==
- Édouard Lock – Amelia (Amérimage-Spectra/Media Principia/Echo Media)
- Mark Adam, Allen Kaeja – Old Country (Kaeja d'Dance Company)
- Veronica Tennant – Shadow Pleasures (Eccentrics Things)
- Nicholas de Pencier – Streetcar (Mercury Films)
- Barbara Willis Sweete – The Firebird (Rhombus Media)

== Best Direction in a Lifestyle/Practical Information Program or Series ==
- Gwynne Basen – Recreating Eden (Merit Motion Pictures)
- Romano D'Andrea – Arresting Design (Planetworks)
- Edward Mowbray – Chef At Large (Ocean Entertainment)
- Donna Leon – Island Vets
- Edward Mowbray – The Food Hunter (Ocean Entertainment)

== Best Direction in a Children's or Youth Program or Series ==
- Philip Earnshaw – Degrassi: The Next Generation – Pride (Bell Media/Epitome Pictures)
- Mike Fallows – Miss Spider's Sunny Patch Kids (Nelvana)
- Chuck Rubin – Poko – Poko on the Moon (Halifax Film Company)
- Don McBrearty – Ghost Cat (Cellar Door Productions/Whizbang Films)
- Martin Wood – The Impossible Elephant (Edge Entertainment)

== Best Direction in a Live Sporting Event ==
- Paul Hemming – CFL : Wendy's Friday Night Football – Saskatchewan at Hamilton (TSN)
- Ron Forsythe – 2003 Heritage Classic: Mega Stars Game & NHL Game (CBC Sports)
- Paul Hemming – 2004 World Junior Ice Hockey Championships – Gold Medal Game (TSN)

== Best Writing in a Dramatic Program or Mini-Series ==
- Linda Svendsen, Brian Mckeown – Human Cargo (Force Four Entertainment)
- Andrew Rai Berzins, Roland Rhodes – Cowboys and Indians: The J.J. Harper Story (High Definition Pictures/The Film Works/APTN/CBC)
- Raymond Storey – Open Heart (Barna-Alper/Dreamsmith Entertainment/Movie Central/CBC)

== Best Writing in a Dramatic Series ==
- Chris Haddock, Alan Di Fiore – Da Vinci’s Inquest – Bury My Own Bones (Haddock Entertainment/Barna-Alper Productions/Alliance Atlantis/CBC)
- Chris Haddock, Alan Di Fiore – Da Vinci’s Inquest – A Man When He's Down (Haddock Entertainment/Barna-Alper Productions/Alliance Atlantis/CBC)
- Tassie Cameron – The Eleventh Hour – Georgia (Alliance Atlantis)
- Susan Coyne, Mark McKinney, Bob Martin – Slings & Arrows – Madness in Great Ones (Rhombus Media)
- Wayne Grigsby – Snakes and Ladders – Section 24 (Big Motion Pictures)

== Best Writing in a Comedy or Variety Program or Series ==
- Rick Mercer – Made in Canada – The Last Show (Salter Street Films/Island Edge)
- Jackie Torrens, Mike Clattenburg, Robb Wells, John Paul Tremblay – Trailer Park Boys – If I Can't Smoke and Swear I'm Fucked (Showcase/Topsail Entertainment)
- Mark Farrell, Brent Butt – Corner Gas – Tax Man (CTV/Prairie Pants Productions)
- John Pattison – Puppets Who Kill – Dan and the Necrophiliac (Eggplant Picture & Sound)
- Kevin White, Mark Critch, Mark Farrell, Cathy Jones, Shaun Majumder, Peter McBain, Jennifer Robertson, Irwin Barker, Mary Walsh, Greg Thomey – This Hour Has 22 Minutes – Episode 1 (Salter Street Films/CBC)

== Best Writing in an Information Program or Series ==
- Bob McKeown – the fifth estate – Run For Your Life (CBC)
- Evan Solomon – CBC News: Sunday (Canadian Broadcasting Corporation)
- Linden MacIntyre – the fifth estate – Death of a Beauty Queen (CBC)
- Terry Milewski – The National/CBC News – Cover Up (CBC)
- Lisa Bowes, Richard Wright – Sports Journal (CBC Sports)

== Best Writing in a Documentary Program or Series ==
- John Haslett Cuff – Crimes of the Heart (John Haslett Cuff)
- Mary Lynk – From the Heart: The Life & Times of Janet Conners (NFB)
- Michael McNamara – Radio Revolution: The Rise and Fall of the Big 8 (Markham Street Films)
- Don Murray – The Man Who Could Be King (Nomad Films)
- Michael Maclear – Vietnam: Ghosts of War (Memory Films)

== Best Writing in a Children's or Youth's Program or Series ==
- Jason Hopley, Jamie Shannon – Nanalan' – Free (The Grogs/Lenz Entertainment)
- Nicole Demerse, James Hurst, Shelley Scarrow – Degrassi: The Next Generation – Accidents Will Happen (Bell Media/Epitome Pictures)
- Ian Weir – Edgemont – You Gotta Have Friends – CBC/Omnifilm Entertainment)
- Jennifer Cowan – Edgemont – Two Guys and a Baby – CBC/Omnifilm Entertainment)
- John van Bruggen – Jacob Two-Two – Jacob Two-Two and the Purloined Hockey Card (Nelvana/Salter Street Films)
- Robert C. Cooper – The Impossible Elephant (Edge Entertainment)

== Best Performance by an Actor in a Leading Role in a Dramatic Program or Mini-Series ==
- Brent Carver – Elizabeth Rex (Rhombus Media)
- Nicholas Campbell – Human Cargo (Force Four Entertainment)
- Bayo Akinfemi – Human Cargo (Force Four Entertainment)
- Vincent Walsh – Shattered City: The Halifax Explosion (CBC Television)
- Nicholas Lea – The Investigation (CTV/Muse Entertainment/Studio Eight Productions/Voice Pictures)

== Best Performance by an Actress in a Leading Role in a Dramatic Program or Mini-Series ==
- Diane D'Aquila – Elizabeth Rex (Rhombus Media)
- Kate Nelligan – Human Cargo (Force Four Entertainment)
- Megan Follows – Open Heart (Barna-Alper/Dreamsmith Entertainment/Movie Central/CBC)

== Best Performance by an Actor in a Continuing Leading Dramatic Role ==
- Paul Gross – Slings & Arrows – A Mirror Up To Nature (Rhombus Media)
- Nicholas Campbell – Da Vinci’s Inquest – Bury My Own Bones (Haddock Entertainment/Barna-Alper Productions/Alliance Atlantis/CBC)
- Jeff Seymour – The Eleventh Hour – The Missionary Position (Alliance Atlantis)
- Michael Riley – This Is Wonderland – Episode 10 (Muse Entertainment/Indian Grove Productions)
- Shawn Doyle – The Eleventh Hour – Hard Seven (Alliance Atlantis)

== Best Performance by an Actress in a Continuing Leading Dramatic Role ==
- Catherine Disher – Snakes and Ladders – Section 24 (Big Motion Pictures)
- Tracy Waterhouse – Blue Murder – Midnight Man (Barna-Alper Productions/Canwest/North Bend Films)
- Waneta Storms – The Eleventh Hour – The Revenge Specialist (Alliance Atlantis)
- Martha Burns – Slings & Arrows – A Mirror Up To Nature (Rhombus Media)
- Cara Pifko – This Is Wonderland – Episode 7 (Muse Entertainment/Indian Grove Productions)

== Best Performance by an Actor in a Guest Role Dramatic Series ==
- Richard Chevolleau – The Eleventh Hour – Hard Seven (Alliance Atlantis)
- Gordon Pinsent – The Eleventh Hour – Wonderland (Alliance Atlantis)
- Doug McGrath – This Is Wonderland – Episode 13 (Muse Entertainment/Indian Grove Productions)
- Peter Outerbridge – This Is Wonderland – Episode 7 (Muse Entertainment/Indian Grove Productions)
- Rogue Johnston – This Is Wonderland – Episode 9 (Muse Entertainment/Indian Grove Productions)

== Best Performance by an Actress in a Guest Role Dramatic Series ==
- Nicky Guadagni – Blue Murder – Eyewitness (Barna-Alper Productions/Canwest/North Bend Films)
- Janet Bailey – Blue Murder – Upstairs Downstairs (Barna-Alper Productions/Canwest/North Bend Films)
- Diana Leblanc – Snakes and Ladders – Squattergate (Big Motion Pictures)
- Catherine Fitch – This Is Wonderland – Episode 8 (Muse Entertainment/Indian Grove Productions)
- Angela Asher – This Is Wonderland – Episode 5 (Muse Entertainment/Indian Grove Productions)
- Clare Coulter – This Is Wonderland – Episode 6 (Muse Entertainment/Indian Grove Productions)

== Best Performance by an Actor in a Featured Supporting Role in a Dramatic Series ==
- Michael Murphy – This Is Wonderland – Episode 3 (Muse Entertainment/Indian Grove Productions)
- Eric Peterson – This Is Wonderland – Episode 4 (Muse Entertainment/Indian Grove Productions)
- Michael Healey – This Is Wonderland – Episode 10 (Muse Entertainment/Indian Grove Productions)
- Tom Rooney – This Is Wonderland – Episode 1 (Muse Entertainment/Indian Grove Productions)
- Mark McKinney – Slings & Arrows – Madness in Great Ones (Rhombus Media)

== Best Performance by an Actress in a Featured Supporting Role in a Dramatic Series ==
- Rachel McAdams – Slings & Arrows – A Mirror Up To Nature (Rhombus Media)
- Jennifer Irwin – Slings & Arrows – A Mirror Up To Nature (Rhombus Media)
- Andrea Robinson – Doc – Angels in Waiting (Paxson Entertainment/Pebblehut Productions)

== Best Performance by an Actor in a Featured Supporting Role in a Dramatic Program or Mini-Series ==
- Ted Dykstra – Shattered City: The Halifax Explosion (CBC Television)
- Currie Graham – Cowboys and Indians: The J.J. Harper Story (High Definition Pictures/The Film Works/APTN/CBC)
- Hrothgar Mathews – Human Cargo (Force Four Entertainment)
- Hakeem Kae-Kazim – Human Cargo (Force Four Entertainment)
- Jeremy Raymond – The Incredible Mrs. Ritchie (Showtime Networks/Nomadic Pictures)

== Best Performance by an Actress in a Featured Supporting Role in a Dramatic Program or Mini-Series ==
- Nthati Moshesh – Human Cargo (Force Four Entertainment)
- Cara Pifko – Human Cargo (Force Four Entertainment)
- Myriam Acharki – Human Cargo (Force Four Entertainment)

== Best Individual Performance in a Comedy Program or Series ==
- Gavin Crawford – This Hour Has 22 Minutes – Episode 4 (Salter Street Films/CBC)
- Jeremy Hotz – Just for Laughs (Just for Laughs Comedy Festival/Les Films Rozon)
- Danny Bhoy – Just for Laughs (Just for Laughs Comedy Festival/Les Films Rozon)
- Shaun Majumder – Comedy From the Coast
- Gavin Crawford – The Gavin Crawford Show – Oh the Huge Manatee (Idle Mind Productions/Shaftesbury Films)
- Russell Peters – Comedy Now! (CTV/Hi Guys Ten Productions)
- Roman Danylo – Comedy Inc. (SFA Productions)

== Best Ensemble Performance in a Comedy Program or Series ==
- Rick Mercer, Dan Lett, Leah Pinsent, Jackie Torrens, Peter Keleghan – Made in Canada – The Last Show (Salter Street Films/Island Edge)
- Brent Butt, Janet Wright, Tara Spencer-Nairn, Nancy Robertson, Eric Peterson, Gabrielle Miller, Fred Ewanuick, Lorne Cardinal – Corner Gas – Face Off (CTV/Prairie Pants Productions)
- Rebecca Northan, Paul O’Sullivan, Debra McGrath, Lisa Merchant, Peter Oldring – The Joe Blow Show (The Comedy Network)
- Shaun Majumder, Greg Thomey, Cathy Jones, Mary Walsh, Mark Critch – This Hour Has 22 Minutes – Episode 1 (Salter Street Films/CBC)
- Jackie Torrens, Cory Bowles, Robb Wells, John Paul Tremblay, Jonathan Torrens, Lucy Decoutere, Barrie Dunn, John Dunsworth, Jeanna Harrison, Sarah Dunsworth-Nickerson, Tyrone Parsons, Patrick Roach, Mike Smith, Shelley Thompson, Michael Jackson – Trailer Park Boys – If I Can't Smoke and Swear I'm Fucked (Showcase/Topsail Entertainment)

== Best Performance or Host in a Variety Program or Series ==
- Paul Brandt – 2003 Canadian Country Music Awards (Canadian Country Music Association/Global)
- Connie Kaldor – Connie Kaldor at Wood River Hall (VisionTV)
- Paul Anka – Paul Anka: RSVP (CBC)
- Rick Mercer – Christmas in Kabul (Salter Street Films)
- Jully Black – Tonya Lee Williams: Gospel Jubilee (Wilbo Entertainment)

== Best Performance in a Performing Arts Program or Series ==
- Peter Chin – Streetcar (Mercury Films)
- Nancy Crowley, Mistaya Hemingway, Keir Knight, Chun Hong Li, Bernard Martin, Jason Shipley-Holmes, Zofia Tujaka, Naomi Stikeman, Billy Smith, Andrea Boardman – Amelia (Amérimage-Spectra/Media Principia/Echo Media)
- Emma Lu Romerein – From Time to Time
- Andy Jones – Andy Jones: To the Wall
- Russell Braun – Opening Night (CBC)
- Ewa Uziel, Eugene Nakamura, Michele Dumoulin, John Morris Russell, Konstantin Popovic, Dawn Hrycak-Popovic, Kevin Filewych, Henryk Uziel, Valerie Selander Voisey, Andrew McIntosh, Pola Luboniecka, Jonathan Tortolano, Darrett Zusko, Besnik Yzeiri, Gregory Sheldon, Margaret Kapasi, Peter Wiebe – Cross-Canada Candlelight Christmas – Windsor Symphony Orchestra Concert (CBC)

== Best Performance in a Preschool Program or Series ==
- Jamie Shannon, Jason Hopley – Nanalan' – Free (The Grogs/Lenz Entertainment)
- Rebecca Nagan, Wim Booth, Julie Westwood, Gillie Robic, Mark Jefferis, Don Austen, John Eccleston – The Hoobs (The Jim Henson Company/Decode Entertainment)
- Alyson Court – The Big Comfy Couch – Clowning in the Rain (Radical Sheep Productions)

== Best Performance in a Children’s or Youth Program or Series ==
- Elliot Page – Ghost Cat (Cellar Door Productions/Whizbang Films)
- Jake Epstein – Degrassi: The Next Generation – Should I Stay or Should I Go (Bell Media/Epitome Pictures)
- Tom Barnett – Ghost Cat (Cellar Door Productions/Whizbang Films)
- Al Mukadam – Radio Free Roscoe – The Awful Truth (Decode Entertainment)
- Lauren Collins – renegadepress.com – Skin Deep (Vérité Films)

== Best News Anchor ==
- Peter Mansbridge – The National/CBC News – Kabul Afghanistan/Liberal Leadership Convention/Ottawa (CBC)
- Lloyd Robertson – CTV National News (CTV)
- Kevin Newman – Global National (Global)

== Best Reportage ==
- Neil Macdonald, David Common, Bill Loucks – The National/CBC News – Haiti Watch/Hectic Haiti/Guy Philippe (CBC)
- Alexei Sergeev, Michel Cormier – The National/CBC News – Georgia Protest: Tbilisi Tension/Tbilisi March/Tbilisi Aftermath (CBC)
- Nahlah Ayed, Jim Hoffman – The National/CBC News – Report from Iraq/Mass Graves/Grave Stories (CBC)
- Janis Mackey Frayer – CTV National News (CTV)
- Rod Ellis, Lucien Millette, Lisa LaFlamme – CTV National News – Meat Inspectors (CTV)
- Avis Favaro – CTV National News – Trans Fats (CTV)

== Best Host or Interviewer in a News Information Program or Series ==
- Evan Solomon – CBC News: Sunday (CBC)
- Mark Kelley – CBC News: Disclosure – Cherry Bomb/File H-316/Blockbuster Science (CBC)
- Craig Oliver – Question Period (CTV)
- Dianne Buckner – Venture – Lawyer Sues Food Companies/The Corporation/AC Problems (CBC)
- Wendy Mesley – Marketplace – Cellphone Controversy/Chiropractors & Vaccinations/Ritalin (CBC)

== Best Host or Interviewer in a Lifestyle/General Interest or Talk Program or Series ==
- Pete Luckett – The Food Hunter (Ocean Entertainment)
- Debbie Travis – Debbie Travis' Facelift – Lawrence's Kids' Rooms/Nadia's Basement/Emma's Bachlorette (Whalley-Abbey Media)
- Marilyn Denis – CityLine (Citytv)
- Evan Solomon – Hot Type (CBC Newsworld)
- Carol Off – CounterSpin (CBC Newsworld)

== Best Host or Interviewer in a Practical Information, or Performing Arts Program or Series ==
- Shaun Majumder – Shaun's Great Adventure (CBC)
- Ryley Alp – Broken House Chronicles – Ryley's Revenge (Mountain Road Productions)
- Leigh Uttley – Broken House Chronicles – Ryley's Revenge (Mountain Road Productions)
- George Brook – Broken House Chronicles – Ryley's Revenge (Mountain Road Productions)
- Mike Holmes – Holmes on Homes (General Purpose Entertainment)
- Karen Bertelsen – Stylin' Gypsies (W Network)

== Best Host or Interviewer in a Sports Program or Sportscast ==
- Ron MacLean – Hockey Night in Canada, Hockey Day in Canada (CBC Sports)
- Scott Russell – 2003 UCI Road World Championships – Elite Men's Final (CBC Sports)
- Josette Normandeau – Deadly Arts – Capoeira (Nintendo)
- James Duthie – NHL on TSN – Pre-Game (TSN)
- Tom Harrington – Sports Journal (CBC Sports)

== Best Sports Play-by-Play or Analyst ==
- Jim Hughson – 2003/04 Molson Canadian Canucks – Colorado Avalanche at Vancouver Canucks (Sportsnet)
- Don Wittman – 2004 Nokia Brier (CBC Sports)
- Pierre McGuire – NHL on TSN (TSN)

== Best Photography in a Dramatic Program or Series ==
- Rene Ohashi – Shattered City: The Halifax Explosion (CBC Television)
- David Frazee – Cowboys and Indians: The J.J. Harper Story (High Definition Pictures/The Film Works/APTN/CBC)
- David Frazee – Da Vinci’s Inquest – Bury My Own Bones (Haddock Entertainment/Barna-Alper Productions/Alliance Atlantis/CBC)
- Les Erskine – Da Vinci’s Inquest – A Man When He's Down (Haddock Entertainment/Barna-Alper Productions/Alliance Atlantis/CBC)
- Henry Chan – Human Cargo (Force Four Entertainment)
- Peter Woeste – Stargate SG-1 – Nightwalkers (Stargate SG-1 Productions)

== Best Photography in a Comedy, Variety, Performing Arts Program or Series ==
- Kim Derko – Youkali Hotel (Enigmatico Films/Westwind Pictures)
- André Turpin – Amelia (Amérimage-Spectra/Media Principia/Echo Media)
- Paul Tolton – Shadow Pleasures (Eccentrics Things)
- Rudolf Blahacek – Death and the Maiden (Rhombus Media)

== Best Photography in an Information Program or Series ==
- Colin Allison – the fifth estate – Run For Your Life (CBC)
- Ian Hannah – CBC News: Sunday (Canadian Broadcasting Corporation)
- Aldo Columpsi – On the Road Again (CBC)
- Henry Less – Made to Order (Mercer Street Films)
- Brad Schewaga – The Thirsty Traveler (Grasslands Entertainment)

== Best Photography in a Documentary Program or Series ==
- John Walker – Men of the Deeps (CTV/John Walker Productions/Picture Plant/NFB)
- Michael Grippo – Sleeping Tigers: The Asahi Baseball Story (NFB)
- Claudine Sauvé – Short Infinity (NFB)
- Susan Fleming, Keith Brust – Garden Mimics (Bullfrog Films)
- Wayne Vallevand, Mike Rudyk – The Lone Trail: The Dogs and Drivers of the Yukon Quest (CBC)

== Best Visual Effects ==
- Don Urquhart, Claude Theriault, Colin Cunningham, Thomas Turnbull – Shattered City: The Halifax Explosion – Part 1 (CBC Television)
- Brad Turner, Peter Hunt, Simon Lacey, Grant Lindsay – Andromeda – A Symmetry of Imperfection (Fireworks Entertainment/Tribune Entertainment/BLT Productions/Global/MBR Productions)
- James Tichenor, Simon Ager, Michelle Comens, Adam de Bosch Kemper, Deborah Dunphy, Shannon Gurney, Krista McLean, Matthew Talbot-Kelly, Craig Van Den Biggelaar, Bruce Woloshyn – Stargate SG-1 – Redemption, Part 2 (Stargate SG-1 Productions)
- James Tichenor, Simon Ager, Nicholas Boughen, Michelle Comens, Bruce Woloshyn, Tom Brydon, Matt Martell, Marc Roth, Wes Sargent – Stargate SG-1 – Descent (Stargate SG-1 Productions)
- Clem Hobbs, Miles Horst, Donnie Anderson, Andy Russell – The Blobheads – Bringing Up Baby (Decode Entertainment)
- Tony Coleman – National Geographic Channel Specials – Asteroid! The Doomsday Rock (CBC/Raincoast Storylines)

== Best Picture Editing in a Dramatic Program or Series ==
- Lisa Binkley – Human Cargo (Force Four Entertainment)
- Lara Mazur – Da Vinci’s Inquest: "A Man When He's Down" (Haddock Entertainment/Barna-Alper Productions/Alliance Atlantis/CBC)
- Christopher Donaldson – Slings & Arrows: "Madness in Great Ones" (Rhombus Media)
- Teresa Hannigan – The Eleventh Hour "The Missionary Position" (Alliance Atlantis)
- Jason Nielsen – renegadepress.com: "The Long Way Home" (Vérité Films)

== Best Picture Editing in a Comedy, Variety, Performing Arts Program or Series ==
- Édouard Lock – Amelia (Amérimage-Spectra/Media Principia/Echo Media)
- Darel Fortin – The Planets (Amérimage-Spectra, Echo Media)
- Jeff Bessner – From Time to Time
- Andy Attalai – Shadow Pleasures (Eccentrics Things)
- Daryl K. Davis, Mike Munn – Youkali Hotel (Enigmatico Films/Westwind Pictures)

== Best Picture Editing in an Information Program or Series ==
- Loretta Hicks – the fifth estate – No Way Home (CBC)
- Leslie Steven Onody – the fifth estate – Dead in the Water (CBC)
- Kelly A. Morris – the fifth estate – Run For Your Life (CBC)
- Mark Solnoky – CBC News: Disclosure – Blockbuster Science (CBC)
- Jim Goertzen – CBC News: Disclosure – The Making of a Political Animal (CBC)
- Nabil Mehchi, Andrew Kemp – Debbie Travis' Facelift – DJ's Garden (Whalley-Abbey Media)

== Best Picture Editing in a Documentary Program or Series ==
- Nick Hector – Dying at Grace (TVOntario)
- Wayne Abbott – From a Place Called War: 1939–1945 (Northern Sky Entertainment)
- Richard Comeau – Short Infinity (NFB)
- Marc Robichaud, Tony Coleman – The Canadian Experience: Expo '67: Back to the Future (CBC)
- Marke Slipp – Totem: The Return of the G'psgolox Pole (NFB)

== Best Production Design or Art Direction in a Dramatic Program or Series ==
- Lawrence Collett – Human Cargo (Force Four Entertainment)
- Donna Noonan – Bliss – Steph’s Life (Galafilm/Back Alley Film Productions)
- Craig Sandells – The Shields Stories – Dolls, Dolls, Dolls, Dolls (Shaftesbury Films)
- Matthew Davies – Elizabeth Rex (Rhombus Media)
- Matthew Davies – The Incredible Mrs. Ritchie (Showtime Networks/Nomadic Pictures)
- Sandra Kybartas – This Is Wonderland – Episode 8 (Muse Entertainment/Indian Grove Productions)

== Best Production Design or Art Direction in a Non-Dramatic Program or Series ==
- Astrid Janson – Shadow Pleasures (Eccentrics Things)
- Rhonda Moscoe – From Time to Time
- Brendan Smith – Puppets Who Kill – The Twilight Place (Eggplant Picture & Sound)
- Stephen Osler, Tom Anthes – This Hour Has 22 Minutes – Episode 1 (Salter Street Films/CBC)
- Hugh Shankland – Youkali Hotel (Enigmatico Films/Westwind Pictures)

== Best Costume Design ==
- Lyn Kelly, Diana Cilliers – Human Cargo (Force Four Entertainment)
- Trysha Bakker – Shattered City: The Halifax Explosion (CBC Television)
- Brenda Shenher – Corner Gas – I Love Lacey (CTV/Prairie Pants Productions)
- Charlotte Penner – The Shields Stories – Dolls, Dolls, Dolls, Dolls (Shaftesbury Films)
- Patti Bain Parsons – This Hour Has 22 Minutes – Episode 1 (Salter Street Films/CBC)

== Best Achievement in Make-Up ==
- Debra Johnson, Gérald Altenburg, Mary Monforte – Elizabeth Rex (Rhombus Media)
- Beverley Keigher – Da Vinci’s Inquest – Bury My Own Bones (Haddock Entertainment/Barna-Alper Productions/Alliance Atlantis/CBC)
- Marilyn O'Quinn, Zinka Shankland – The Eleventh Hour – Hard Seven (Alliance Atlantis)
- Karen Byers, Penny Lee – This Hour Has 22 Minutes – Episode 1 (Salter Street Films/CBC)
- Elizabeth Kuchurean – Shattered City: The Halifax Explosion (CBC Television)

== Best Sound in a Dramatic Program ==
- Martin Lee, Steve Hammond, Tom Bjelic, Allan Fung, Doug Johnston, Ian Rankin, John Douglas Smith – Shattered City: The Halifax Explosion (CBC Television)
- John Hazen, Mark Gingras, Steve Hammond, Leon Johnson, John Laing, Tim O’Connell – Cowboys and Indians: The J.J. Harper Story (High Definition Pictures/The Film Works/APTN/CBC)
- Tony Gronick, Hennie Britton, Michael P. Keeping, Conrad Kuhne, Brent Marchenski, Vince Renaud, Clive Turner, Joseph Rossi – Human Cargo (Force Four Entertainment)
- Tom Bjelic, Georges Hannan, Don Dickson, Allan Fung, John Sievert, Mark Wright, John Douglas Smith – Open Heart (Barna-Alper/Dreamsmith Entertainment/Movie Central/CBC)

== Best Sound in a Dramatic Series ==
- Louis Hone, Paul Hubert, Gabor Vadnay, Stan Sakellaropoulos, Peter Lopata – Bliss – Steph’s Life (Galafilm/Back Alley Film Productions)
- Eric Fitz, Grant Bone, Erik Culp, Steve Hammond, Jack Heeren, John Douglas Smith, Adam Roberts – Blue Murder – Eyewitness (Barna-Alper Productions/Canwest/North Bend Films)
- Dino Pigat, Eric Apps, Paul Germann, Alastair Gray, Steve Kostick, Brian Newby, Donna G. Powell – The Eleventh Hour – Wonderland (Alliance Atlantis)
- Rob Bryanton, Jeff Hamon, Evan Rust, Warren St. Onge – renegadepress.com – Out in the Open (Vérité Films)
- Janice Ierulli, Susan Fairbairn, Leon Johnson, Sid Lieberman, Brent MacLean, Ian Rankin, Lou Solakofski – The Shields Stories – The Harp (Shaftesbury Films)

== Best Sound in a Comedy, Variety, or Performing Arts Program or Series ==
- David Hillier, Martin Lee, Alex Salter, Lou Solakofski – Men of the Deeps (CTV/John Walker Productions/Picture Plant/NFB)
- Daniel Pellerin, Elma Bello, Stefan Fraticelli, Daniel Hamood, Goro Koyama, Stephen Marian, Scott Shepherd – Puppets Who Kill – The Twilight Place (Eggplant Picture & Sound)
- Neal Gaudet, Kenny MacDonald, Bob Melanson, Brian Power, Lil Thomas, P.J. MacNeil – This Hour Has 22 Minutes – Episode 1 (Salter Street Films/CBC)
- Norm Lussier – Paul Brandt Presents
- Damian Kearns, Danny Greenspoon, Doug Doctor, Doug McClement, Howard Baggley, Jeremy Darby – 2003 Canada Day Evening Show (National Capital Commission/Canadian Heritage/CBC)

== Best Sound in an Information/Documentary Program or Series ==
- Marie-Claude Gagné, Hubert Macé de Gastines – The Nature of Things – Arctic Mission (CBC)
- Damian Kearns, Joe Passaretti – the fifth estate – Dead in the Water (CBC)
- Steve Cupani – City of Ruins: The Halifax Explosion (CBC)
- Loïc Thériault, Sylvain Brassard, Vivian Savoy, Dany Ouellet, Benoît Dame – Deadly Arts (Nintendo)
- Emil Jany – Frontiers of Construction – Road Warriors (Ragged Earth Productions/Barna-Alper Productions)

== Best Original Music Score for a Program or Mini-Series ==
- Daniel Séguin, James Jandrisch – Human Cargo (Force Four Entertainment)
- Christopher Dedrick – Elizabeth Rex (Rhombus Media)
- Robert Carli – Open Heart (Barna-Alper/Dreamsmith Entertainment/Movie Central/CBC)
- Christopher Dedrick – Shattered City: The Halifax Explosion (CBC Television)

== Best Original Music Score for a Dramatic Series ==
- Ron Sures – The Eleventh Hour – Hard Seven (Alliance Atlantis)
- Luc Arsenault – Chilly Beach – Invasion of the Beer Snatchers (March Entertainment)
- Ron Sures – Slings & Arrows – A Mirror Up To Nature (Rhombus Media)
- Christopher Dedrick – The Shields Stories – A Wood (Shaftesbury Films)
- Brian Carson, Ari Wise – Silverwing – Dark Alliance (Bardel Entertainment/Philippine Animation Studio)

== Best Original Music Score for a Documentary Program or Series ==
- Robert Carli – Galileo's Sons (Bullfrog Films)
- Jean-Louis Valéro – Korea: The Unfinished War – Burnt Ground (TVOntario)
- Chris Crilly – Short Infinity (NFB)
- Ben Johannesen, Geoff Bennett – Garden Mimics (Bullfrog Films)
- Clode Hamelin – Totem: The Return of the G'psgolox Pole (NFB)

== Special awards ==
- Gordon Sinclair Award for Broadcast Journalism – Neil Docherty
- Earle Grey Award – Graham Greene
- Margaret Collier Award – Wayne Grigsby
- Gemini Award for Outstanding Technical Achievement – Majestic (Dome Productions)
- Canada Award: Anand Ramayya, Joseph MacDonald, Cosmic Current
- Gemini Humanitarian Award – George R. Robertson
- Viewer's Choice Award for Lifestyle Host: Mike Holmes, Holmes on Homes
- Gemini Award for Most Popular Website Competition: Michael Prini, Alexia Patton, Sarah Richardson – www.roomservice.ca
