= Deadly Arts =

Deadly Arts may refer to:

- Deadly Arts, a martial arts documentary series hosted by Josette Normandeau
- G.A.S.P!! Fighters' NEXTream, a 1998 fighting game for the Nintendo 64, released in North America as Deadly Arts
