= Ooh, Aah & You =

American television program

- Title card
- Also known as: Ooh & Aah
- Genre: Educational
- Created by: Jason Hopley and Jamie Shannon
- Voices of: Marty Stelnick; Jason Hopley (United Kingdom, Canada & United States); Simon Kennedy; Matt Moore (Australia & New Zealand)
- Countries of origin: Canada; United States
- Original language: English
- No. of seasons: 2 (2 for shorts)

Production
- Running time: 1-3 minutes
- Production companies: Grogs Inc. Kick Start Productions

Original release
- Network: Playhouse Disney; Disney Junior
- Release: July 15, 2005 – February 13, 2011

Ooh, Aah & You, also known as Ooh & Aah, is a short-form children's series created by the Canadian puppeteer duo Jason Hopley and Jamie Shannon, who also created Nanalan' and Mr. Meaty. It was produced by Kick Start Productions. In the United States, the shorts premiered in July 2005 during the Playhouse Disney line up. Ooh and Aah are a pair of monkey puppets. On March 31, 2007, they became the official hosts of Playhouse Disney, replacing Clay and Page. They introduced the various long format (22 minute) and short format (1-3 minute) shows that aired on the network.

It last aired on February 13, 2011, the day before Disney Junior debuted, meaning that the short programs and mascots were dropped. After the daily sign-off was presented for the last time on that day, the mascots were retired. The segments and short programs of the show were briefly available on Disney Junior's official website as part of its "Fan Favorites" week on the week of July 18, 2011.

== Characters ==
Ooh and Aah, the main characters of the show

- Ooh (voiced by Marty Stelnick) is Aah's older brother, the calm blue monkey who loves to read and listen to classical music.
- Aah (voiced by Jason Hopley) is Ooh's younger brother, the hyper red monkey who loves to dance, sing, and play.
- Roland is Ooh's stuffed elephant.
- Dave is Aah's stuffed penguin.
- Sheila is a butterfly who flutters around Ooh and Aah's room.

=== Voices ===
- United Kingdom, Canada and United States - Marty Stelnick and Jason Hopley provided the voices of Ooh and Aah respectively.
- Australia and New Zealand - In Australia and New Zealand, the voices of Ooh and Aah were provided by Sydney-based Comedian Simon Kennedy and Actor Matt Moore respectively.

== Websites ==
- The first version begins with Ooh and Aah smiling. Aah grabs a banana and the bananas read, "Print and Color". Ooh grabs the pineapple's top and Roland pops up. The pineapple reads, "Watch a Video". The female voice-over is heard in the US and the male voice-over is heard in the UK. The video clips are short. "Say Hello to Ooh and Aah" is used below the list.
- The second version is the same as the first version. The party hat has "Going Bananas" in it and Aah surprises it. The video clips are long.
- The third version consists of Ooh and Aah welcoming the website. "GAMES" replaces "Print and Color" and "ACTIVITIES" replaces "Watch a Video". There is a guitar with "MUSIC" in it and a book with "STORIES" in it. Games has Ooh and Aah's Coco-Nutty Bowling and Inspector Ooh: The Great Monkey Detective. Activities has Print and Color, Watch a Video and Ooh and Aah's Fetch-A-Fruit. Music has Going Bananas. Stories has Wish You Were Here. The new video clips are short.
- The fourth and final version was the same as the third version. A new game, Ooh and Aah's Costume Catch is used in the Games section and a new story, Ooh and Aah's What's in the Birthday Box? Storybook is used in the Stories section. Wish You Were Here is in the Activities section instead of the Stories section. The new video clips are long.

== Episode list ==
1. Happy Monkey (long format) -- original air date July 15, 2005
2. Loud & Quiet (short format) -- original air date July 29, 2005
3. Banana Power (short format) -- original air date August 12, 2005
4. I Spy Bananas (short format) -- original air date August 30, 2005
5. Halloween (long format) -- original air date September 13, 2005
6. Ooh's Birthday (long format) -- original air date September 30, 2005
7. Coconut Song (short format) -- original air date October 14, 2005
8. Monkercise (short format) -- original air date November 4, 2005
9. Monkey Dance (short format) -- original air date December 9, 2005
10. Monkey See, Monkey Do (short format) -- original air date December 13, 2005
11. Monkey in the Middle (short format) -- original air date January 20, 2006
12. Twinkle Twinkle (long format) -- original air date January 27, 2006
13. Banana Day (short format) -- original air date February 3, 2006
14. Cowboy Day (long format) -- original air date February 10, 2006
15. Penguins & Elephants (short format) -- original air date February 17, 2006
16. Hide and Seek (short format) -- original air date March 10, 2006
17. Valentine's Day (long format) -- original air date March 24, 2006
18. Friendship Day (long format) -- original air date April 14, 2006
19. Pretend Fleas (short format) -- original air date April 21, 2006
20. Pirate Day (short format) -- original air date May 5, 2006
21. Monkador (short format) -- original air date June 3, 2006
22. Best Friends Day (long format) -- original air date June 8, 2006
