= Normandeau =

Normandeau is a surname. Notable people with the surname include:

- Josette Normandeau (born 1968), Canadian television producer and martial artist
- Nathalie Normandeau (born 1968), Canadian politician
- Robert Normandeau (born 1955), Canadian composer

== See also ==
- Fort Normandeau
