= English Teachers =

English Teachers

- Teaching English as a foreign language
- English Teachers (TV series), a Canadian documentary television series
