= Weird Years =

Canadian animated sitcom (2006–2007)

- Promotional poster
- Created by: Jason Hopley; Jamie Shannon
- Directed by: Jerry Popowich
- Starring: Cal Dodd; Kathleen Laskey; Phil McCordic; Susan Roman; Tajja Isen
- Composer: Jack Lenz
- Country of origin: Canada
- No. of seasons: 1
- No. of episodes: 26

Production
- Executive producers: Jack Lenz; Clint Eland
- Animator: 9 Story Entertainment
- Running time: approx. 23 mins (per episode)
- Production companies: Lenz Entertainment; Mercury Filmworks; Grogs Inc.

Original release
- Network: YTV
- Release: November 6, 2006 – June 11, 2007

Weird Years is a Canadian family animated sitcom produced by Lenz Entertainment and Mercury Filmworks. Created by Jason Hopley and Jamie Shannon, the show was aired on YTV from November 2006 to June 2007. 26 half-hour episodes of the show were produced. The series follows the Dorkovitch family, who emigrated from the fictional Kryobia in Eastern Europe to Happy Valley, Labrador, Canada. The family try to adapt to life in the New World and maintain the traditions of their homeland.

== Synopsis ==
Weird Years is an animated sitcom about the adult-aged plumber Donko Dorkovitch and his eccentric family, who come to Canada from the fictional Kryobia in Eastern Europe. The show takes a look into the adventures of the Dorkovitch family in the 'new world'. They live in the Labrador town of Happy Valley.

== Characters ==
=== Main Characters: The Dorkovitches ===
- Donko Dorkovitch – a master plumber who enjoys singing and dancing as he tries to understand the New World and participate in it. He lives by old Kryobian sayings. Despite a sad childhood, he remains very optimistic and is rarely seen without a smile on his face. He believes his father was killed by Yuri the Yak Herder and attacks Yak herders on sight.
- Magda Dorkovitch – a butcher who can't cook anything but can make delicious sandwiches. She has strong opinions and always likes to do things the "right way". She tends to quote Jay Leno, often mistaking him for Buddha.
- Zozo Dorkovitch – the family's strange and mystical link to the Old World. She is thought to have been an assassin in the past and is known for her stubborn and outspoken nature. She believes that a Kryobian person called Drago Merka discovered America. Her husband, Igor, was injected with a deadly poison and she keeps him in an icebox in the basement, awaiting the discovery of a cure. Zozo once owned the most successful restaurant in Kryobia.
- Rasputin the Goat – a smart goat who tries to catch Donko's attention with physical comedy and is described as "a very goofy goat".
- Ivan Dorkovitch – the son of Donko and Magda and twin brother of Nadia, he enjoys modern technology and visiting Bill Tweed, the family's neighbour.
- Nadia Dorkovitch – Ivan's twin sister, she is smart and talented and active in protecting the environment and her family. She liked to see the modern world but is intrigued by her grandmother's memories of Kryobia. Nadia appears to have inherited her grandmother's cooking ability.

=== Supporting characters ===
- Beverly Tweed – the seductive neighbour of the Dorkovitches. She is seen to have been attracted to Donko. Additionally, she is hinted at having once been a drug addict, being shown to attend/counsel a drug rehabilitation clinic where Magda was once forced to attend.
- Bill Tweed – Beverly's recently unemployed husband. He was once obsessed with comic books, especially Coyote Man and its creator, Don Wong. He is known to have kept a sandwich made by Magda and partially eaten by Don Wong in a display case in the middle of his living room. Although seemingly negligent, he loves Beverly and remembers every detail of their first date, which he claims was the best day of his life. He was once an avid curler.
- Annabelle and Belle – two old women who live across the street from the Dorkovitches, in a large old house. They dress in an early 20th-century fashion with bonnets, dresses, and handbags, and enjoy spying on their neighbours and rumouring.
- Danny Jeng – A wealthy neighbour, seemingly of Asian descent with an obnoxious attitude and laugh.

== Episodes ==
=== Season 1 ===
1 – Requiem for a Screen – The family intervenes when Ivan becomes seriously addicted to video games.

2 – Wingnut 500 – Magda can't get the rest of her family to listen to her and do things properly. When she's given a test robot to follow her orders at works, she decides to try it out on her family.

3 – Zozo's False Teeth – Zozo's false teeth foretell that the Donkey of Death is coming for her. Donko finds himself having to decide if he should put her in a retirement home.

4 – Silence of the Goats – An outbreak of Calpine fever has created a world-wide cull of goats, putting Rasputin at risk. The Dorkovitch family rallies to defend its weirdest member.

5 – Best of Friends - A new family, the Murtons, move into Happy Valley. Donko attempts to be hospitable but grows suspicious when the family seem secretive as to who they really are.

6 – Death of a Mailman – When Zozo accidentally causes the local mailman's death, she makes the ridiculous claim he is "secret police" and subsequent events seem to bear her out.

7 – Goat Stew – Magda takes a routine medical exam to increase her benefits at Foodies and rid Ivan of the curse of the Dorkovitch tooth. However, the test results threaten the whole family's future.

8 – The Last Donko – Ivan and Nadia become suspicious that their parents belong to the Mafia, and Ivan becomes determined to be a son worthy of the next Kryobian Don.

9 – Autopia – Magda wants to get rid of the family's decrepit car and buy a new one, but Donko is opposed due to all the good memories he associates with it.

10 – Lawn and Order – Greed takes hold of the Dorkovitch family; Zozo has to take matters into her own hands to set things right.

11 – Weekend Retreat – Magda's absence is felt when she goes to a corporate retreat, where she is unexpectedly joined by Donko and Zozo, causing a commotion.

12 – Zozo Stewart – A food critic discovers Zozo's magnificent cooking and she is catapulted into unwanted celebrity with her own restaurant and cooking show.

13 – The Truth about Truth – Nadia purposefully flunks a test and tells Zozo that she doesn't believe Captain Drago Merka discovered America. Zozo digs a grave and climbs in, refusing to leave until Nadia believes.

14 – Home for the Holidays – It's the Dorkovitch's favourite holiday. Zozo has it all planned out, cooking with Nadia at her side. Everyone else just has to be back in time for the dinner, which is more difficult than it seems.

15 – The Bears and The Bees – Zozo is trying to make Rasputin make "pump-pump" with a she-goat, but he won't. Meanwhile, Ivan is invited to a girl's house and thinks she wants to have sex with him; Donko's attempts to explain sex worsen the situation.

16 – The Pipes – Much to Ivan's horror, Donko has taken him under his wing to teach him the plumbing trade.

17 – Infoodelity – Donko secretly eats some of Granny Jang's delicious food, knowing it is a betrayal of Zozo.

18 – A Band Apart – Nadia starts a rock band, and Donko tries to lend a hand.

19 – Drive Me Insane – Ivan forgets to mail Magda's driver's license renewal and she has to retake her driver's test, showing to the kids to her extreme fear about tests.

20 - Home on the Driving Range - After repairing the sprinkler system at the Grande Country Club, Donko is rewarded with a free day pass for him and his family.

21 - The Big Thaw - Zozo's husband Igor Dorkovitch returns.

22 - Donko Stormy Night - Scary movies, ghosts in the basement, and annoying old friends make for an interview night in the Dorkovitch home.

23 - Best Before - Beverly Tweed comes on to Donko, but he tries to focus her attention on her husband.

24 - The Sausaginator - Magda and Donko invent a unique sausage making machine.

25 - Dirty Laundry - Zozo points out that it is the time of the shooting stars.

26 - Plumber on the Roof - Donko is discouraged after losing the Plumber of the Year Award for a fifth year.

== Production ==
Weird Years is the first animated TV series by Lenz Entertainment, co-produced by animation studio Mercury Filmworks in association with YTV, which ordered 26 episodes of the half-hour series. Corus Entertainment's Peter Moss served as creative producer with story editor Larry Mirkin and directors Clint Eland and Jerry Popowich. The series was created by comedy improvisers and puppeteers Jason Hopley and Jamie Shannon.

== Release ==
The series premiered on YTV on November 6, 2006.
