= Karen Kaeja =

Canadian choreographer and dancer

- Born: November 25, 1961 (age 63); Toronto, Ontario
- Education: York University (BFA)
- Occupation(s): Choreographer, dancer
- Spouse: Allen Kaeja
- Website: kaeja.org

Karen Kaeja is a Canadian choreographer and dancer. She has been the co-artistic director of Kaeja d’Dance with her husband Allen Kaeja since 1990. In 2012, Kaeja conceived the community-based performance series Porch View Dances in Toronto's Seaton Village neighbourhood.

Among her stage works is Crave. According to The Toronto Star, she is "exploding barriers between art and life".

Kaeja has received multiple nominations for the Dora Mavor Moore Award.
