= Mr. Meaty =

American-Canadian teen puppet series

- Genre: Teen sitcom; Surreal humor; Puppetry
- Created by: Jamie Shannon; Jason Hopley
- Starring: Jamie Shannon; Jason Hopley; Marty Stelnick; Ali J. Eisner
- Composers: Asher Lenz; Stephen Skratt
- Countries of origin: United States; Canada
- Original language: English
- No. of seasons: 2
- No. of episodes: Shorts: 17; Full-length episodes: 20 (32 segments)

Production
- Executive producer: Jack Lenz
- Producers: Jason Hopley; Jamie Shannon
- Editor: Susan Cormack
- Running time: 3 minutes (shorts); 22 minutes (full-length)
- Production companies: Nickelodeon Productions; 3Js Productions; Canadian Broadcasting Corporation

Original release
- Network: CBC Television (Canada); Nickelodeon (2006, US); Nicktoons (2007–2009, US)
- Release: September 22, 2006 – May 23, 2009

Mr. Meaty is a teen sitcom created by Jamie Shannon and Jason Hopley for Nickelodeon. The series centers on lazy teenager duo Josh Redgrove and Parker Dinkleman, who work at the titular and shopping mall-located fast food restaurant, where they often encounter supernatural and bizarre situations. The series is set in the fictional town of Scarnchboro, which is based on Scarborough, Ontario.

Mr. Meaty originated as a series of seventeen shorts that appeared as interstitials on Nickelodeon in the United States and CBC Television in Canada. A pilot episode featuring material from the shorts aired on December 30, 2005. The series officially premiered on September 22, 2006, and continued to air until May 23, 2009. Despite the series' cancellation, Mr. Meaty would continue to air reruns on Nicktoons until January 4, 2010 It ended with a total of two seasons and twenty episodes, three of which are 22-minute specials.

== Premise ==
Mr. Meaty centers on a pair of teenagers working at the titular fast food restaurant established in the fictional Scaunchboro Mall: the nerdy, gluttonous and awkward Parker Dinkleman (Jason Hopley) and the charming, popular, but uncaring and self-centered Josh Redgrove (Jamie Shannon). The duo are often placed in bizarre, supernatural or grotesque situations. They are also seen dealing with common teenage situations such as dating and peer pressure.

== Characters ==
=== Main ===
- Josh Redgrove: (voiced by Jamie Shannon) The sixteen-year-old cashier of Mr. Meaty.
- Parker Dinkleman: (voiced by Jason Hopley) Josh Redgrove's best friend and fry cook co-worker. The character's appearance and voice are based on former coworker William Pawson.
- Edward R. Carney: (voiced by Marty Stelnick) The original founder and current owner of the Mr. Meaty chain.
- Mr. Wink: (voiced by Todd Doldersum) The manager with an electric chip on the back of his head, he was once a kind and friendly individual.
- Lizzy: an Alien who only worked at mr meaty for a short time She was cleverly disguised as an attractive young woman, being crushed on by both Josh and Parker for a short time.
- Chip 2.6: First seen in Model Employee. He is a robot, built to be the perfect Mr. Meaty employee.
- Eddie: Parker's pet yeti who only worked at Mr. Meaty's for a little bit, but was shipped back to the Himalayas.

=== Minor ===
- Ashley Steinberg: Her best friends are Brittney and Ashley 2. She seems to be the leader of the trio.
- Brittney Of the three, she seems to have the most common sense and is almost always there to offer advice to Josh and Parker.
- Art"ee"st Woman: The owner of Pantosphere.
- Ashley 2: She and Brittney are followers of Ashley.
- Goth Girl: She is a goth who went on a date with Josh to see the premiere of Star Raiders IV.
- Gord: He wears his blond hair in beaded dreadlocks.
- Ping: An employee who teaches Josh and Parker to be ninjas.
- Doug: A beefy security guard with a buzz haircut, black shades, and a prominent bottom lip. He speaks with a macho attitude and is very dedicated to his job.
- R.O.B.: R.O.B. is the Mr. Meaty security bot who only appeared in "Buffalo Burrito".
- Ashley Steinberg: The long haired brunette who is very concerned. She wears braces.
- Ashley 2: A member of the girl group of Scaunchburo Mall who shares the same name as Ashley Steinberg.
- Brittany: The most reasonable and apparently liked girl of Scaunchburo Mall.
- Tanya: A thick lipped girl with black shades and long dirty blonde hair.
- Parkerina: (female version of Parker) who dressed in a cowgirl outfit, two red pigtails over his shoulders and with notable eyelashes.
- Natasha: A European member of the Against Josh Group who appears on the screen during the Against Josh Group meeting in "Parkerina".
- Sky: A member of the girl's group.
- Ken: Josh's older brother who is extremely annoying.
- Darryl: Ken's best friend and his bodyguard.
- Tyrone: Provides the music for The Tater Tots so they can break dance.
- Tater Tots: Three 8-year-old Hip-Hop gangster brats.
- Hamish: Parker's other best friend.
- Natalie: A little vampire girl discovered in the freezer. She turned Parker and Josh into vampires.
- Barb: Josh's ex-girlfriend made of meat.
- Leanne: Parker's girlfriend.
- Brandon DuBois III: Parker's friend.
- Gavin: Parker's friend.
- Karlon Bugosi: A former actor who has now become a brain-eating zombie. Bugosi only appeared in "Dream of the Dead", in which he was the main antagonist and anti-hero.
- Lucas E. Romero: A horror movie director who only appeared in "Dream of the Dead."

== Production ==
Mr. Meaty began as a series of shorts that played between longer programs on Nickelodeon from 2002 to 2005. They were also featured on CBC's variety show The Void, on Nickelodeon's iTunes listings, and on the TurboNick website. The show was Shannon and Hopley's second production for Nickelodeon after Nanalan', as well as the Disney Junior series Ooh, Aah & You.

Neither of the series' creators had worked at a fast food restaurant prior to creating it. However, Hopley had once worked at a movie theater's concessions stand, which gave him inspiration for some of the ideas in the show. He has additionally cited The Ren & Stimpy Show as a source of inspiration for the series' style of humor.

The series was created specifically for a teenage audience; of the target age group, executive producer Jack Lenz said, "Entertaining kids in their teens is not easy and it takes a very strong concept to catch on with this demographic. Mike Judge clearly nailed it with Beavis and Butt-Head and we believe that Mr. Meaty will do the same."

Nickelodeon commissioned a season of full-length episodes around September 2005. An 11-minute pilot titled "In Parker's Sight" aired on December 30, 2005. It was a retrospective featuring material from the earlier shorts. On September 22, 2006, the series made its official debut on Nickelodeon. The episode "Buffalo Burrito" had been released as a sneak peek on the iTunes Store two days earlier on September 18. The series moved to Nickelodeon's sister channel Nicktoons on February 23, 2007. Nicktoons aired the remaining episodes from March 10, 2007, to May 23, 2009.

== Episodes ==
=== Series overview ===
Season	Episodes		Originally released		
Season	Episodes		First released	Last released	Network
Pilot			December 30, 2005		Nickelodeon
1	12	10	September 22, 2006	December 9, 2006	Nickelodeon
1	12	2	March 10, 2007	March 17, 2007	Nicktoons
2	8		December 6, 2008	May 23, 2009	Nicktoons

=== Pilot (2005) ===
Title	Directed by	Written by	Original release date
"In Parker's Sight"	Jamie Shannon & Jason Hopley	Jamie Shannon & Jason Hopley	December 30, 2005
When Josh and Parker get locked in a freezer, Josh reflects on good times while Parker eats everything in sight.

=== Season 1 (2006–07) ===
No. overall	No. in season	Title	Directed by	Written by	Original release date	Prod. code
Nickelodeon
1a	1a	"Buffalo Burrito"	Jason Hopley	Jason Hopley	September 22, 2006	101
Parker has very bad body odor, but Josh won't tell him for fear of his reaction. Meanwhile, Mr. Meaty is getting ready to introduce their new Buffalo Burrito, and Wink hires two actors to be Bucky Buffalo for the big intro, but they are zapped by the Mr. Meaty Security Bot, who is lurking around the mall. Parker volunteers Josh and himself to be the buffalo, and Josh is forced to get inside the buffalo costume with a very smelly Parker.
1b	1b	"Parkerina"	Jamie Shannon	Jamie Shannon	September 22, 2006	102
Mr. Meaty's latest product, the Ms. Meaty burger, is out, and Josh and Parker try to sell it to girls for their phone numbers. To their dismay, however, none of them accept. Parker, however, has eaten 12 and chugged down the special Girly Sauce, which painfully turns him into a girl. Josh sees this as a way to find out why none of the girls are into him. Josh tells the girls that Parker's name is Parkerina, and she is his cousin from the country and has come to get a big city makeover. Josh leaves her in their hands, and they become friends, causing Parkerina to become more feminine. After talking with the girls where they discuss how Josh uses them to his own gain, Parkerina becomes angry with Josh and rallies the girls to give him a piece of their mind, but at that very moment she turns back into Parker. The girls become even angrier and shove Josh into Ms. Meaty burgers, causing him to turn into Jocelyn while Parker hides in the freezer.
2a	2a	"Schnozzola"	Jamie Shannon	Jamie Shannon	September 29, 2006	105
Josh and Parker try to help Ashley Steinberg get a zit off of her nose with a special concoction, "Nuke 10", but it burns off her nose and they attempt to glue it back on with "Nose Balm 20". Soon they replace her nose with a sausag] after her original nose falls into the deep fryer. Everyone likes the new craze for noses made of Meat.
2b	2b	"Wedgelor"	Jason Hopley	Jason Hopley	September 29, 2006	101
Josh is upset that the mall girls don't like him because he's skinny. Three 8-year-old hip hop gangster brats called the Tater Tots harass him, call him "Skinny Butt," and give him a wedgie. So Josh and Parker go to the store to get protein powder, despite Parker telling Josh to listen to Master Kindu, and encounter a jar on the bargain rack that contains the demon Wedgelor. The demon gives Josh a big beefy body, but he doesn't make his head big to match his body. After that, Wedgelor goes on a wedgie rampage in the mall.
3a	3a	"The Fries That Bind"	Jamie Shannon	Richard Elliott & Simon Racioppa	October 6, 2006	103
After Parker gets caught in a meat explosion caused by Josh, he storms out of Mr. Meaty. Not only did Josh refuse to apologize, he called him "Porker". But when Parker accepts a new job at the "Soy What" counter across the food court, Josh finds that he can't cope without his friend and heads across the court to apologize. Instead, he discovers Parker about to be sacrificed, and eaten by a vicious soy cult. The two friends overcome their differences and battle their way free, armed with such delicious meaty products.
3b	3b	"Moochmaster P."	Jason Hopley	Richard Elliott & Simon Racioppa; Story by : Jamie Shannon	October 6, 2006	105
Parker is hungry and he tries to get Josh to give him one bite of his sandwich. Josh gives in and Parker eats almost the whole thing, so Josh calls him a moocher. Parker then goes around the mall and takes one bite of everyone's food. Then he comes back and eats a raw burger and a tapeworm soon grows in Parker's stomach and eats the food Parker mooches before Parker can.
4a	4a	"Hamish"	Jason Hopley	Jason Hopley	October 13, 2006	102
After Josh abandons Parker for a girl at the premiere of Star Raiders IV, Parker looks for a new best friend. He ends up making one out of ham and other meat from Mr. Meaty and names him Hamish. He and his new friend go to the movie theater to harass Josh and his date.
4b	4b	"Tater Turf"	Jamie Shannon	Jamie Shannon	October 13, 2006	106
The Tater Tots challenge Josh to a dance-off, and Josh wins. But when another challenge comes, Josh reveals that he only has one move.
5a	5a	"Nosferateens"	Jamie Shannon	Jamie Shannon	October 27, 2006	104
Josh and Parker discover a vampire hiding in the freezer and decide that becoming undead is the perfect plan to get away from all of the boring rules they endure every day working for Mr. Meaty. But after making their wish come true, they quickly find out that being vampires is not as cool as they thought.
5b	5b	"I Love Lizzy"	Jason Hopley	Richard Elliott & Simon Racioppa	October 27, 2006	104
When Lizzy, a new employee, arrives at Mr. Meaty, Parker quickly falls for her. She's a messy eater, she likes Star Raiders, and her burps smell like his favorite burger combo. The only problem, however, is that Josh has a crush of her, too. The two boys get into a game of oneupmanship, trying to impress Lizzy – a game that Parker wins. But when Josh discovers that Lizzy’s really a lizard-faced alien, he tries to tell Parker, but Parker doesn't believe him.
6a	6a	"Parker's Date"	Jamie Shannon	Jamie Shannon	November 4, 2006	103
When Josh talks Parker into going on a double-date with him, he has to change his buddy from zero to hero. Despite all of the training, he still is a zero, and the date is disastrous - at least until Parker finds a girl who talks a little Kalingi herself.
6b	6b	"The Tell-Tale Burger"	Jason Hopley	Richard Elliott & Simon Racioppa	November 4, 2006	106
When Parker suddenly runs off to the bathroom, and Josh has to cook fries and causes an overflow of oil, he blames Parker for it. After his guilt takes him over, Josh confesses to Mr. Carney, and as soon gets all tied up as punishment.
7	7	"Model Employee"	Jason Hopley	Jamie Shannon, Jason Hopley, Simon Racioppa & Richard Elliott	November 18, 2006	107
Meatycorp has come up with a new robot, named Chip 2.6, who is assigned to work at the Mr. Meaty at Scaunchboro Mall. Josh takes a liking to Chip, but Parker believes it is out to take their jobs.
8a	8a	"Unihorn"	Jamie Shannon	Richard Elliott & Simon Racioppa	November 25, 2006	108
Parker finds a magic crystal and receives a unicorn horn with the power to heal. Josh gets jealous and summons the unicorn with the same crystal, but things go awry when he becomes an ugly-looking horse himself.
8b	8b	"Josh-Off"	Jamie Shannon	Richard Elliott & Simon Racioppa; Story by : Jason Hopley	November 25, 2006	108
Josh tells Parker to stop such being a dork and act like him, so Parker does... literally. Now, they have a face-off, hosted by Doug to see who is the real Josh.
9a	9a	"Roast Beef Barb"	Jason Hopley	Jason Hopley	December 2, 2006	109
Parker makes Josh a meat girlfriend. Everyone at the mall makes fun of her and Josh defendes her. Then Barb leaves Josh for a prime rib.
9b	9b	"My Eddie"	Jamie Shannon	Jamie Shannon	December 2, 2006	109
Parker orders a baby yeti that he saw on a commercial on Asian TV, and names him "Eddie." That night, when Eddie eats everything stored in the freezer and grows into a giant yeti the next morning as a result, Josh and Parker have to think of a way to convince the management to provide them with more meat. But when Wink comes by to drop off the new products, Parker must figure out what to do with Eddie Even worse, Mr. Carney and Wink find Eddie, and decide that they can do something about Eddie and Parker, which involves having an abominable barbecue.
10a	10a	"Doug of the Dead"	Jason Hopley	Richard Elliott & Simon Racioppa	December 9, 2006	110
A strange new device is brought to Mr. Meaty, called the SALIVATOR-X8, guaranteed to increase meat sales by 200%. When activated, however, it turns the patrons of the mall into meat-feasting zombies. Fortunately, Doug saves Josh and Parker from the zombies and destroys the machine.
10b	10b	"Suburb of the Apes"	Jason Hopley	Jason Hopley	December 9, 2006	110
After Ken and Darryl steal the first Game Craze, which rightfully belonged to them, Josh and Parker build a time machine to go two months into the future. They find Scaunchboro Mall to be invaded by baboons. It turns out that the machine sent them into the year 2676, where baboons rule the earth.
Nicktoons
11a	11a	"Original Sin"	Jason Hopley	Jason Hopley, Jamie Shannon, Richard Elliott & Simon Racioppa	March 10, 2007	111
In this flashback episode, Wink recalls the good old days before two meddlesome teenagers came along and thawed out Mr. Carney and how Wink received an implant on his neck.
11b	11b	"Ninjam"	Jamie Shannon	Richard Elliott & Simon Racioppa; Story by : Jamie Shannon	March 10, 2007	111
Josh and Parker ask Ping, the owner of Chop Schtick, to teach them on how to be ninjas, so they can plot revenge on Ken and Darryl.
12a	12a	"Dinkleman"	Jason Hopley	Richard Elliott & Simon Racioppa	March 17, 2007	112
Parker gains superpowers as a bonus from Mr. Carney, but when he sees that Josh is annoyed, he finds a way to make Josh feel more important.
12b	12b	"Incredible Jerk"	Jason Hopley	Jason Hopley	March 17, 2007	112
Years of being insulted finally takes a toll on Parker, who turns into a rampaging beast and insults everyone.

=== Season 2 (2008–09) ===
No. overall	No. in season	Title	Directed by	Written by	Original release date	Prod. code
13a	1a	"Parker's First Kiss"	Jason Hopley	Jason Hopley; Story by : Jason Hopley, Jamie Shannon, Richard Elliott & Simon Racioppa	December 6, 2008	114
Parker gets a girlfriend, but is very nervous about kissing her. He turns to Josh for guidance.
13b	1b	"Kid's Party"	Jason Hopley	Simon Racioppa & Richard Elliott; Story by : Jason Hopley, Jamie Shannon, Simon Racioppa & Richard Elliott	December 6, 2008	114
Britney asks Josh to throw a Mr. Meaty birthday party for her little brother, Taylor. However, when Josh and Parker feed the boy a piece of very sugary cake, he goes hyper and runs crazy through the mall.
14a	2a	"Embarrassed to Death"	Jamie Shannon	Richard Elliott & Simon Racioppa; Story by : Jamie Shannon, Jason Hopley, Richard Elliott & Simon Racioppa	December 13, 2008	115
A video leaked into the internet causes Parker to literally die of embarrassment, but it's not his time to go yet.
14b	2b	"Puppet of Pop"	Jason Hopley	Jason Hopley; Story by : Jason Hopley, Jamie Shannon, Richard Elliott & Simon Racioppa	December 13, 2008	115
Mr. Carney books teen pop star, Jesse Lumberpond (based on Justin Timberlake) to hold a concert at the mall, and Josh and Parker scheme to be in his band, until he is knocked unconscious by Parker.
15a	3a	"Nightmare on Josh Street"	Jason Hopley	Jason Hopley; Story by : Jason Hopley, Jamie Shannon, Richard Elliott & Simon Racioppa	December 20, 2008	116
Josh throws a party while his family is out of the house, but since he's worried about being cool, he decides not to allow Parker to come. Parker shows up anyway.
15b	3b	"Lord of the Geeks"	Jamie Shannon	Jamie Shannon; Story by : Jason Hopley, Jamie Shannon, Richard Elliott & Simon Racioppa	December 20, 2008	116
The cool kids and the geeks must work together to defeat an evil orc.
16a	4a	"Geezers"	Jamie Shannon	Jamie Shannon; Story by : Jamie Shannon, Jason Hopley, Richard Elliott & Simon Racioppa	December 27, 2008	117
Josh and Parker keep putting off the making of their Ninja Zombies movie, so their future selves, from 80 years later, who still haven't made the movie, come back and try to convince them to quit procrastinating.
16b	4b	"Insecurity Guard"	Jamie Shannon	Simon Racioppa & Richard Elliott; Story by : Jamie Shannon, Jason Hopley, Simon Racioppa & Richard Elliott	December 27, 2008	117
After Doug the security guard is injured, Parker decides to take his place. When the position goes to Parker's head, Josh organizes a resistance movement against him.
17a	5a	"Mama's Boy"	Jason Hopley	Jason Hopley; Story by : Jason Hopley, Jamie Shannon, Richard Elliott & Simon Racioppa	January 3, 2009	118
Parker is sick of his mom babying him, so he moves out of the house.
17b	5b	"Puberty Fairy"	Jamie Shannon	Jamie Shannon & Jason Hopley; Story by : Jamie Shannon, Jason Hopley, Richard Elliott & Simon Racioppa	January 3, 2009	118
Parker is visited by the Puberty Fairy, but struggles to hang onto his childhood.
18a	6a	"Flinga Flonga"	Jamie Shannon	Jamie Shannon; Story by : Jamie Shannon, Jason Hopley, Richard Elliott & Simon Racioppa	January 10, 2009	119
Josh and Parker find out that their childhood bully has returned to Scaunchboro, and they plot to get revenge on him. But Josh realizes that Brent has changed and tries to get Parker to call off their "intergalactic revenge."
18b	6b	"Backseat Driver"	Jason Hopley	Jason Hopley; Story by : Jason Hopley, Jamie Shannon, Richard Elliott & Simon Racioppa	January 10, 2009	119
Josh fails his driving test, and instead of admitting it to Brittany, he takes her illegally to the drive-in, secretly using Parker to give him driving guidance.
19	7	"Big Greasy Musical"	Jamie Shannon	Jamie Shannon	May 23, 2009	113
Josh dreams he stars in a musical where he must save Princess Brittany from Mr. Carney's evil clutches using his "diamond voice".
20	8	"Dream of the Dead"	Jason Hopley	Jason Hopley; Story by : Jamie Shannon, Jason Hopley, Richard Elliott & Simon Racioppa	May 23, 2009	120
One day at Mr. Meaty, Parker tells Josh that a man named Lucas E. Romero (based on George A. Romero) is having a horror film competition, which Josh and Parker enter.

== Home media ==
Title	Episode count	Release date	Episodes
Nick Picks Vol. 5	1	March 13, 2007	"Parkerina"

== Reception and legacy ==
Common Sense Media gave the series a rating of 3/5, stating that the humor was geared toward older children and noting that some viewers "will enjoy the idiosyncratic characters and their attempts to survive the uncertainties of puberty." Susan Stewart of The New York Times gave the series a positive review, calling its puppetry "a perfect medium for sending up the foibles of the teenage years" and commending the two main protagonists' "deft characterizations".

In May 2007, the series ranked as the fourth highest-rated Saturday morning program among children aged 2―11.

In 2017, Dave Stopera of BuzzFeed noted that the internet is "full of people traumatized by Mr. Meaty." In 2020, Noah Dominguez of Comic Book Resources stated that "arguably no show the network has ever aired is as strange as Mr. Meaty."

== Future ==
In November 2026, co-creator Jamie Shannon made a social media post explaining that he had rebuilt the puppets for Josh and Goth Girl and expressed interest in a new series starring the two characters.
