= The Shields Stories =

2004 Canadian television drama series

- Country of origin: Canada
- No. of episodes: 6

Production
- Running time: approx. 0:30 (per episode)
- Production company: Shaftesbury Films

Original release
- Network: W
- Release: March 9 – April 13, 2004

The Shields Stories is a Canadian television drama series, which aired on W in 2004. A short-run dramatic anthology series produced by Shaftesbury Films, the series dramatized six short stories by Carol Shields.

The series was a sequel of sorts to Shaftesbury's prior The Atwood Stories, which dramatized six short stories by another Canadian writer, Margaret Atwood. A third series, which would have dramatized short stories by Alice Munro, was planned but did not materialize.

The series was a Gemini Award nominee for Best Drama Series at the 19th Gemini Awards.

== Episodes ==
No.	Title	Directed by	Written by	Original release date	Prod. code
1	"Hazel"	Norma Bailey	David Young	March 9, 2004	1-01
Hazel (Sheila McCarthy), a newly widowed housewife still haunted by visions of her dead husband (Peter Keleghan), finds new meaning in life when she takes a job selling kitchen gadgets.
2	"A Wood"	Lori Spring	Lori Spring	March 16, 2004	1-02
Following the death of their father, musician Elke Wood (Jayne Collins) prepares for an important recital while her brothers Ross (Patrick McKenna) and Stanley (Mark Ellis) argue over how to protect her emotionally.
3	"Windows"	Lynne Stopkewich	Lynne Stopkewich	March 23, 2004	1-03
Married artists MJ (Aidan Devine) and Anne (Kate Greenhouse) find their art and their relationship tested when a government bureaucrat forces them to cover the windows in their house.
4	"Various Miracles"	Mina Shum	Esta Spalding	March 30, 2004	1-04
Camilla (Sara Botsford), a successful writer, encounters intriguing little synchronicities as she tries to sell her latest novel.
5	"The Harp"	Sarah Polley	Sarah Polley	April 6, 2004	1-05
Already having pretty much the worst day of her life, Tracey (Robin Brûlé) confronts the irony in life when she gets knocked down on the street by a musician throwing a harp out his window.
6	"Dolls, Dolls, Dolls, Dolls"	Lori Spring	Lori Spring	April 13, 2004	1-06
When her husband dismisses her doll collection as a childish pastime, Emmy (Torri Higginson) recalls the childhood experience that made her dolls so important to her.
