= Albert Schultz =

Canadian actor and director (born 1963)

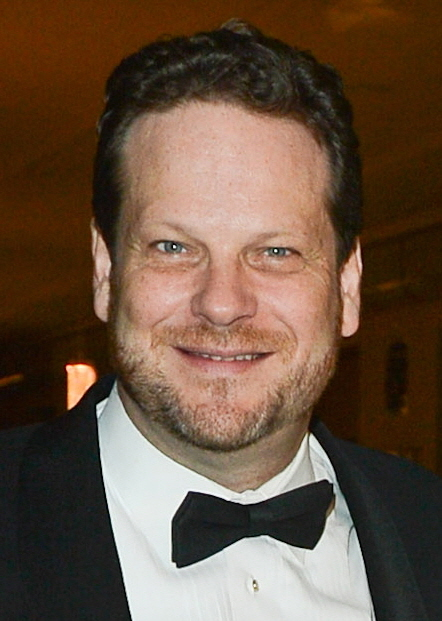
- Schultz in 2013
- Born: Albert Hamilton Schultz; July 30, 1963 (age 63); Port Hope, Ontario, Canada
- Occupations: Actor, director
- Spouses: Susan Coyne (m. 1992; div. 2015) Leslie Lester (m. 2017)
- Children: Julia Coyne Schultz, James Coyne Schultz

Albert Hamilton Schultz (/ʃʊlts/ SHUULTS; born July 30, 1963) is a former Canadian actor, director and the founding artistic director of Toronto's Soulpepper Theatre Company. He resigned from his position with Soulpepper after sexual assault allegations against Schultz became public in January 2018.

== Education ==
Albert Hamilton Schultz was born in Port Hope, Ontario, on July 30, 1963. He is the son of Virginia and Peter Schultz, the publisher of the Port Hope Evening Guide. He has an older brother (Henry) and sister (Amanda). His father died of leukemia when he was six, and his mother moved the family to Napanee, Ontario. He grew up in Okotoks, Alberta. Schultz studied drama at Toronto's York University from 1981 to 1982, and at the London Academy of Music and Dramatic Art from 1984 to 1985. He received an honorary doctorate at Queen's University in 2008 and from Bishop's University in 2009, which has since been rescinded.

== Theatre ==
His theatre career as an actor includes several roles at the Stratford Festival, including Romeo in Robin Phillips' production of Romeo and Juliet, and at Soulpepper, including the title roles in Shakespeare's Hamlet, Chekhov's Platonov, and Alan Ayckbourn's The Norman Conquests. He also played the stage manager in Our Town, Henry in The Real Thing, Alceste in The Misanthrope, Vershinin in Three Sisters, Astrov in Uncle Vanya, El Gallo in the musical The Fantasticks, Ricky Roma in Glengarry Glen Ross, Macheath in The Threepenny Opera and Martin in Edward Albee's The Goat..

== Television ==
Schultz's television career includes the Canadian Broadcasting Corporation's (CBC) 1988 film The Squamish Five, the legal drama Street Legal, the medical drama Side Effects, the comedy The Red Green Show (where he played roofer/country singer Arnie Dogan), the musical film Youkali Hotel, and the role of Conrad Black in CTV's Shades of Black: The Conrad Black Story. He was executive producer of the CBC series Kim's Convenience.

== Directing ==
Schultz has directed Soulpepper's productions of: Death of a Salesman, Twelfth Night, As You Like It, Oh, What a Lovely War!, The Caretaker, Waiting for Godot, No Man's Land, A Chorus of Disapproval, The Time of Your Life, Angels in America, Parts I and II, Amadeus, and Of Human Bondage. He also co-created and directed Soulpepper's musical adaptation of Spoon River. He directed Susan Coyne's Kingfisher Days for the Tarragon Theatre.

== Awards ==
Schultz is the recipient of several awards, including: a Gemini Award, several Dora Mavor Moore Awards, Toronto Critics Awards, the Joan Chalmers National Award for Artistic Direction, the Salute to the City Award, the Toronto Life Award, the Barbara Hamilton Memorial Award, the Toronto Arts Council William Kilbourn Award, and the Queen's Jubilee Medal for his work on behalf of UNICEF. In 2013, he was made a Member of the Order of Canada "for his contributions as a founding member and artistic director of the Soulpepper Theatre Company and for his commitment to training generations of theatre artists." In May 2014, Schultz received the National Arts Centre Award, a companion award of the Governor General's Performing Arts Awards, recognizing work of an extraordinary nature and significance in the performing arts in the past performance year.

== Sexual assault allegations ==
In January 2018, Schultz was publicly accused of sexual assault by four professional actresses who worked with him at Soulpepper Theatre Company. The women involved are Kristin Booth, Diana Bentley, Hannah Miller and Patricia Fagan. Lawsuits on their behalf were filed against both Schultz and Soulpepper. Schultz resigned his position as artistic director on January 4, 2018, saying: "While I will continue to vigorously defend myself against the allegations that are being made, I have made this decision in the interest of the future of the company into which I poured the last 20 years of my life, and in the interest of the aspirations of the artists and administrators of the company."

Despite his stated commitment to defend himself, on August 1, 2018, representatives of Schultz, Soulpepper and the four female cast members stated that the law suits were settled. No details were released publicly.

Ann-Marie MacDonald has spoken of her time as a Soulpepper production's equity deputy, when she complained about a fundraising event where dinners with female cast members were auctioned off.
