= Army of One (2003 film) =

- Directed by: Sarah Goodman
- Screenplay by: Sarah Goodman
- Produced by: Arlene Ami; Sarah Goodman; Erik Paulsson
- Starring: Serena Miller; Thaddeus Ressler; Nelson Reyes
- Cinematography: Andrew Bowley; Alexandra Kondracke
- Edited by: Caroline Christie
- Music by: James Mark Stewart; Paul Watson
- Production companies: Fovea Productions; Red Storm Productions
- Release date: November 7, 2003 (IDFA)
- Running time: 69 minutes
- Country: Canada
- Language: English

Army of One is a Canadian documentary film, directed by Sarah Goodman and released in 2003. The film profiles Serena Miller, Thaddeus Ressler and Nelson Reyes, three young Americans who were moved to register for military service in the wake of the September 11 attacks.

The film premiered in November 2003 at the International Documentary Film Festival Amsterdam. It had its Canadian premiere at the 2004 Hot Docs Canadian International Documentary Festival, where it won the juried award for Best Canadian Feature Documentary.

Goodman received a Gemini Award nomination for Best Direction in a Documentary Program at the 19th Gemini Awards in 2004.
