= Youkali Hotel =

- Genre: Musical drama
- Written by: Patricia Fogliato; David Mortin
- Directed by: David Mortin
- Starring: Patricia O'Callaghan; Albert Schultz
- Theme music composer: Kurt Swinghammer
- Country of origin: Canada
- Original language: English

Production
- Producers: Patricia Fogliato; Stephen Onda
- Cinematography: Kim Derko
- Editors: Daryl K. Davis; Mike Munn
- Running time: 47 minutes
- Production companies: WestWind Pictures; Enigmatico Films

Original release
- Network: CBC Television
- Release: December 4, 2003

Youkali Hotel is a Canadian television musical drama film, directed by David Mortin and broadcast by CBC Television in 2003. The film stars Patricia O'Callaghan as Trish, a waitress at a formerly opulent but now run down hotel bar in Northern Ontario, who learns about a mysterious unsolved murder of a cabaret singer that took place at the hotel in its glory days, and begins to imagine the story with herself as the singer.

The film also features musical performances by Mary Margaret O'Hara, Hawksley Workman, Kurt Swinghammer and Albert Schultz, with numbers performed in the film including songs by Kurt Weill, Randy Newman, Rufus Wainwright and Elvis Costello.

It was loosely based on O'Callaghan's own history of having worked as a waitress before attaining success as a singer and actress, with Youkali having been the title of her first album.

Although set in Northern Ontario, it was actually filmed in the old Grant Hall hotel in Moose Jaw, Saskatchewan. The film received a private screening for cast and crew in Moose Jaw on November 26, 2003, before premiering on December 4 as an episode of CBC's Opening Night arts anthology series.

== Awards ==
Award	Date of ceremony	Category	Nominees	Result	Reference
Gemini Awards	2004	Best Photography in a Comedy, Variety, Performing Arts Program or Series	Kim Derko	Won	
Gemini Awards	2004	Best Picture Editing in a Comedy, Variety, Performing Arts Program or Series	Daryl K. Davis, Mike Munn	Nominated	
Gemini Awards	2004	Best Production Design or Art Direction in a Non-Dramatic Program or Series	Hugh Shankland	Nominated	
Yorkton Film Festival	2004	Best Performing Arts and Entertainment	Youkali Hotel	Won	
Yorkton Film Festival	2004	Best Director, Dramatic	David Mortin	Won	
Yorkton Film Festival	2004	Best Performance, Female	Patricia O'Callaghan	Won	
