= Allen Kaeja =

Canadian film director and choreographer

Allen Kaeja (born in Kitchener, Ontario) is a Canadian film director and choreographer. He entered the field of dance after nine years of wrestling and judo, and has created over 90 dance pieces since 1981 and choreographed 26 films. Kaeja is one of the co-artistic directors of Kaeja d'Dance, along with his wife Karen Kaeja and has completed an MA dance degree at York University. He is co-founder of the CanAsian International Dance Festival.

== Work ==
Kaeja's dance film Of the Heart (2008) was co-directed with Douglas Rosenberg. Allen and Karen Kaeja teach master classes in Kaeja Partnering and Dance Film. Allen teaches at the School of the Toronto Dance Theatre and Toronto Metropolitan University. Express Dance, co-written by Allen and Karen, is used as a teacher resource for grades 4 to 12 dance curriculum in Ontario. Kaeja has published his second book, entitled Transcending Media: Adapting the Dance Production Asylum of Spoons, from Stage to Film.

In 2011, Kaeja co-created the Porch View Dances series with Karen Kaeja and Kaeja d'Dance. In 2019, in honour of the success of the series in Toronto's Seaton Village, the city of Toronto officially renamed a laneway in the neighbourhood "Porch View Dances Lane."

== Education ==
Kaeja and Karen Kaeja teach master classes in Kaeja Partnering and Dance Film. Kaeja teaches at the School of the Toronto Dance Theatre and Toronto Metropolitan University.

Express Dance, co-written by Allen and Karen, is used as a teacher resource for grades 4 to 12 dance curriculum in Ontario. Kaeja has published his second book, entitled Transcending Media: Adapting the Dance Production Asylum of Spoons, from Stage to Film.

== Film ==
Kaeja's father, Morton Norris (born Mordechai Nosal), was a refugee and Holocaust survivor from Poland that emigrated to Canada. Over the last 30 years, Kaeja produced 32 works inspired by the Holocaust. Select films from Kaeja's portfolio are a part of the permanent collection at the Museum of Modern Art and the Jewish Museum (Manhattan), the Yad Vashem in Israel and the Canadian Museum of History. During his career, Kaeja created over 210 dance pieces as well as directed and/or choreographed for 35 films. Kaeja's dance film Of the Heart (2008) was co-directed with Douglas Rosenberg.[5]

Kaeja also performed as Pushkin in Moze Mossanen’s Gemini-winning dance film Nureyev.

== Live Performances ==
Throughout his career, Kaeja co-developed many site-specific and audience interactive engagement performances with Karen Kaeja. These include Porch View Dances (2012 - present), Downtown Dances (2016 – present, with Atlantic Ballet Theatre of Canada), Animating Historic Spaces – Montgomery’s Inn (2016 & 2014), Fools Paradise – Open Doors Ontario (2015), ROGUE show (2015), fFIDA 1991, fFIDA w CBC Toronto 1992 & 1993, Canada Dance Festival with CBC Ottawa (1996), and Savage Garden (1989).

== Awards and recognition ==
Kaeja’s awards include the Kathryn Ash Award for Choreography, Clifford E. Lee, K.M. Hunter, and Paul D. Fleck Choreography Awards (Canada), the Bonnie Bird Award (UK), a UNESCO citation, and the Moving Picture Award for best performance (Canada). In 2015, Allen was nominated for the: Ontario Arts Foundation Artist Educator Award; for “[exemplifying] excellence in arts education” and “[demonstrating] a unique approach to their arts education practice.” In 2011, Kaeja co-created the Porch View Dances series with Karen Kaeja and Kaeja d'Dance.[6] In 2019, in honour of the success of the series in Toronto's Seaton Village, the city of Toronto officially renamed a laneway in the neighbourhood "Porch View Dances Lane."[11] Later that year, Allen and Karen received the Dance Ontario Lifetime Achievement Award for their substantial contribution to the “development of dance in [Ontario].”
