= Broken House Chronicles =

- Genre: Design, Renovation
- Created by: Tim Alp
- Starring: George Brook, Leigh Uttley, Ryley Alp
- Theme music composer: Bartmart Audio
- Country of origin: Canada
- Original language: English
- No. of seasons: 3
- No. of episodes: 32

Production
- Executive producer: Tim Alp
- Production locations: Ottawa, Ontario, Canada
- Running time: 30 Minutes
- Production company: Mountain Road Productions

Original release
- Network: HGTV (Canada) DIY Network (Canada)
- Release: 2001

Broken House Chronicles is a Canadian television series which premiered in 2001 on HGTV (Canada) and was produced by Mountain Road Productions.

This 32-episode series chronicled a first-time homeowner named George Brook and his roommate Leigh Uttley as these two men tackled do-it-yourself (DIY) projects. After its original appearance on HGTV, this show returned to television on the DIY Channel.

== Awards ==
Year	Nominee / work	Award	Result
2004	Broken House Chronicles	Gemini Award, Category: Best Host in a Lifestyle/Practical Information, or Performing Arts Program or Series – George Brook	Nominated
2004	Broken House Chronicles	Gemini Award, Category: Best Host in a Lifestyle/Practical Information, or Performing Arts Program or Series – Ryley Alp	Nominated
2004	Broken House Chronicles	Gemini Award, Category: Best Host in a Lifestyle/Practical Information, or Performing Arts Program or Series – Leigh Utley	Nominated
2002	Broken House Chronicles	Gemini Award, Category: Best Practical Information Series	Won

== International Syndication ==
Country / Region	Name	Television Network	Dubbing / Subtitles
Canada	Broken House Chronicles	DIY Network (Canada)	English
