= Deafplanet =

2003 Canadian TV series

- Genre: Kids
- Created by: Mark J.W. Bishop, Matt Hornburg, Anita Small, Joanne Cripps
- Written by: Mark J.W. Bishop, Matt Hornburg, Anita Small, Joanne Cripps
- Directed by: Wayne Moss
- Starring: Amanda Richer; Michael Bishop; Jeri Cripps; Andrew Byrne; Geordie Telfer
- Country of origin: Canada
- Original languages: English; American Sign Language
- No. of seasons: 2
- No. of episodes: 20 x 6 Minutes

Production
- Executive producers: Mark J. W. Bishop; Matthew Hornburg
- Producers: Ajeeth Parkal; Donna Luke; Justin Harding; Kim Creelman; Rob Brunner
- Running time: 6 minutes
- Production companies: Marblemedia & Canadian Cultural Society of the Deaf

Original release
- Network: TVO
- Release: September 6, 2003 – March 19, 2005

Deafplanet is a Canadian television series for children in American Sign Language (ASL). It was created by marblemedia in collaboration with TVOntario and the Canadian Cultural Society of the Deaf. A French-language version of the show was also produced, using Quebec Sign Language (LSQ).

The TV series aired in Canada on provincial broadcasters TVOntario, Access, SCN and Knowledge. The show debuted in late 2003 and lasted for two seasons. The entire series has since been made available on the Encore+ channel on YouTube.

== Plot ==
The show follows the character Max, who one day was fooling around with a museum rocket display and accidentally launched himself into space. He lands on "Deafplanet", where he meets a deaf teenager Kendra (Amanda Richer). She only uses sign language, but with the help of an interpreting robot, Max is able to understand her. She is determined to help Max get back to his home.

== Episodes ==
=== Season 1 ===
No.	Title	Original release date
1	"To Air is Human"	6 September 2003
2	"The Clever Lever"	13 September 2003
3	"The Itch"	20 September 2003
4	"Muscle Mania"	27 September 2003
5	"Lightning the Load"	4 October 2003
6	"Math-O-Maniac"	11 October 2003
7	"Max Overdrive"	18 October 2003
8	"I'm Stuck on You"	25 October 2003
9	"Heat"	1 November 2003
10	"The Silent Giant"	8 November 2003

=== Season 2 ===
No.	Title	Original release date
11	"Bad Vibrations"	15 January 2005
12	"Purple Hayz"	22 January 2005
13	"Reflex Effects"	29 January 2005
14	"See-Thru Me Too"	5 February 2005
15	"Learn or Burn"	12 February 2005
16	"Buzzing Off"	19 February 2005
17	"Eye Spy"	26 February 2005
18	"Power Trip"	5 March 2005
19	"Shake N' Quake"	12 March 2005
20	"What Goes Up, Must Come Down"	19 March 2005

== Streaming ==
As of 2017, the show has begun streaming online for free on Canada Media Fund's Encore+ YouTube channel.

== Awards ==
2002	International EMMY Awards	Best Interactive Website nomination for www.deafplanet.com
2004	NHK Japan Prize	Grand Finalist for producing www.deafplanet.com – Web Division
2004	NHK Japan Prize	Finalist for producing www.deafplanet.com – Television Division
2004	Gemini Award	Nomination for www.deafplanet.com for Most Popular Website
2004	Codie Award	Nominated for Best Educational Solution
2004	Gemini Award	Nomination for www.deafplanet.com for Best Interactive Website
2005	World Summit Award	e-inclusion award for www.deafplanet.com
2005	NHK Japan Prize	Finalist for producing www.deafplanet.com
2005	Gemini Award	Nomination for www.deafplanet.com for Most Popular Website
2005	Gemini Award	Nomination for www.deafplanet.com for Best Interactive
