= Christmas in Kabul =

- Written by: Paul Mather; Rick Mercer
- Directed by: Geoff D'Eon
- Country of origin: Canada
- Original language: English

Original release
- Network: CBC
- Release: 2003

Christmas in Kabul is a CBC Christmas special about comedian Rick Mercer going to Afghanistan to bring Christmas cheer to the Canadian troops stationed outside Kabul.

Music stars Damhnait Doyle, Kevin Fox and Tom Cochrane accompanied Mercer to Camp Julien, where many of the troops lived in large tents.

It originally aired on December 21, 2003, on CBC.
