= The Grogs =

Canadian puppets

Three J's Productions (also known as Grogs Inc.) was a Canadian puppet company troupe active from 1992 to 2009. They produced a variety of television shows and short films for Nickelodeon, its sister channels YTV and Nickelodeon Canada, Treehouse TV, and CBC Television.

== Career ==
The Grogs were founded by Jack Bayley, Jamie Shannon and Jason Hopley in 1992 in Toronto. As a puppet troupe, they were somewhat unusual as they designed and moulded their puppets and sets as part of the creative process for writing, directing, and performing in their TV shows. They were present in the process from pre-production to post-production with the help of their partner Jack Lenz. The troupe's name comes from their work on interstitials for YTV featuring a group of monster puppets called the Grogs; by the end of the year, YTV had aired a Christmas special featuring the Grogs, and the duo were working on a series. After a stunt 12-hour "takeover" of the channel on New Year's Day 1994 by one of their characters, Warren Chester Grog, the channel's viewership soared. However, when the network wanted to merchandise the puppets, the relationship soured; the process introduced them to Lenz, who counseled them to start their own company—at which time the network fired Shannon and Hopley.

In 1997, Hopley operated the titular monster in the Goosebumps episode, The Blob That Ate Everyone. In 1999, the Grogs began a partnership with Nickelodeon, producing a series of shorts called Nanalan' for the network and its sister channel Noggin, which aired in Canada on YTV and CBC. In 2004, Nickelodeon released the shorts to DVD. Nanalan' was developed into a full-length series that finished airing in 2004. In the same year, the Grogs appeared and worked on the Nick Jr. series Whoopi's Littleburg. In 2005, they produced a teen-oriented sitcom for Nickelodeon titled Mr. Meaty, which likewise began as a collection of shorts. These were originally seen on TurboNick and during commercial breaks on Nickelodeon's channels. It was picked up for two seasons of 22-minute episodes that aired from 2006 to 2009 on Nickelodeon and Nicktoons.

Their other work has included Swami Jeff's Temple of Wisdom, The Grogs, Warren, Filth, Gidian, Iffer, Sorbet, Jasper and Cupcake, Al's Tales of the Tank, It's Alive!, Ooh, Aah & You, the animated series Weird Years, and Hotbox.

The Grogs were formally dissolved in 2009 after a successful 17-year partnership.
