= Nanalan' =

Canadian children's television show

- Russell (left) and Mona (right)
- Created by: Jamie Shannon; Jason Hopley
- Directed by: Michael Larsh
- Starring: Jamie Shannon; Jason Hopley; Ali Eisner; Marty Stelnick
- Composer: Jack Lenz
- Country of origin: Canada
- Original language: English
- No. of seasons: 2
- No. of episodes: 72 (shorts); 41 (full-length)

Production
- Executive producers: Jack Lenz; Jamie Shannon
- Producer: Tim Williams
- Cinematography: John M. Tran
- Running time: 3 minutes (shorts); 21 minutes (full-length)
- Production company: The Grogs

Original release
- Network: YTV (shorts); CBC Television (Kids' CBC) (series)
- Release: September 7, 1998 – November 1, 2004

Nanalan' is a Canadian children's television series created by Jamie Shannon and Jason Hopley. It began in 1998 as a series of three-minute shorts originally broadcast on YTV; it later ran for two seasons of full-length (21 minutes) episodes that were first broadcast by CBC. The series chronicles the small-scale adventures and discoveries of a three-year-old puppet girl named Mona in her grandmother Nana's backyard. The title is a portmanteau of the phrase "Nana Land," referring to the setting.

Hopley and Shannon produced the series through their puppetry troupe The Grogs in association with Lenz Entertainment. The show uses a blend of hand puppetry and the manipulation of cardboard cutouts, particularly in the opening theme. While the shorts do not follow a structure, the half-hour episodes follow a loose format that includes at least one song or reading an original story to the viewers.

The show received three nominations at the 2004 Gemini Awards and was fairly well received by Canadian and U.S. press, with some critics calling attention to the show's surreal presentation and genuine approach to its concept. In 2004, select shorts were released across several DVDs and VHS in the U.S. In the mid-2010s and mid-2020s, the series went viral with a resurgence in popularity on websites such as Tumblr and YouTube for its bizarre nature.

Interest in the series was renewed in late 2023 after video clips of it went viral on TikTok. The new success led to Hopley and Shannon reuniting for the first time since disbanding The Grogs in 2009, reprising Nana and Mona for interviews and online videos.

== Premise ==
The show focuses on Mona, a three-year-old girl with a big imagination and a tendency to repeat short words or phrases while also mispronouncing them. Each episode begins with Mona's mother dropping her daughter off at Nana's house while heading for work and then picks Mona up after that. Mona, Nana, and Nana's pet dog, Russell, spend the day exploring, learning, and visiting Nana's next-door neighbour Mr. Wooka.

== Characters ==
- Mona (Jamie Shannon) is the main character of the series. She is an almost-three-year-old with lime green skin, lime green hair styled in pigtails, a spherical head, and large bean-shaped eyes. In the original shorts, she cannot speak in full sentences and can only say a few words, but quickly started speaking more coherently in the full-length series. She has a tendency to mispronounce words; for example, she says pea pod as "peepo" and mushroom as "shoosh."
- Nana (Jason Hopley) (Bea) is Mona's grandmother, who Mona stays with every weekday while her mother goes to work. Nana has bright orange skin and a very tall forehead. She wears a multicolored dress and large, round glasses. In the original shorts, her hair is auburn; in the full-length episodes, her hair is white.
- Russell (Ali Eisner) is Nana's pet Dog Jack Russell Terrier whom Mona plays with while visiting Nana's house. Russell does not talk, but often attempts to communicate by barking and gesturing. Mona often pronounces his name incorrectly, calling him "Russer."
- Mr. Wooka (Todd Doldersum) (Hank) is Nana's next-door neighbour who is a main character in the full-length episodes. He is an elderly man with yellow skin and a white mustache who wears green corduroy pants held up with suspenders. Whenever Mona visits his yard, he puts on his own puppet shows to entertain her.
- Mom (Marty Stelnick) is Mona's mother and Nana's daughter. She has a similar appearance to Mona, but is taller and has brown hair in a bob. She is married to Mona’s unnamed father. She works during the day and leaves Mona in Nana's care while she works.
- Alice is Nana's pet cat. She appears infrequently, but when she does appear, she is often at odds with Russell. Like with Russell, Mona mispronounces her name, and often calls her "Ally".

== Episodes ==
=== Season 1 (2003) ===
NOTE: All episodes in this season were written by Jamie Shannon and Jason Hopley and directed by Tim Williams.

No. overall	No. in season	Title	Original release date
1	1	"Lollipop"	November 3, 2003
2	2	"Sunshine"	October 31, 2003
3	3	"Big Girl"	September 5, 2003
4	4	"Rainy Day"	November 10, 2003
5	5	"Free"	September 1, 2003
6	6	"Purple Juice"	September 3, 2003
7	7	"Snow"	December 29, 2003
8	8	"Chirp"	October 17, 2003
9	9	"Play Day"	December 31, 2003
10	10	"Bye Bye"	December 30, 2003
11	11	"Chipmunk in the House"	October 7, 2003
12	12	"Hummingbird"	November 7, 2003
13	13	"Love"	December 28, 2003
14	14	"Home"	September 4, 2003
15	15	"Birdsong"	September 2, 2003

=== Season 2 (2004) ===
NOTE: All episodes in this season were written and directed by Jamie Shannon and Jason Hopley.

No. overall	No. in season	Title	Original release date
16	1	"Hooray For You"	August 30, 2004
17	2	"Smelly Smell"	August 31, 2004
18	3	"Brownies"	September 1, 2004
19	4	"Hootenanny"	September 2, 2004
20	5	"Under My Wing"	September 3, 2004
21	6	"Sick As A Dog"	September 6, 2004
22	7	"Nanalympics"	September 7, 2004
23	8	"Spring"	September 8, 2004
24	9	"Bee Sting"	September 9, 2004
25	10	"Purple Monster"	September 10, 2004
26	11	"Bubbles"	September 13, 2004
27	12	"Helpful Girl"	September 14, 2004
28	13	"Night, Night Nana"	September 15, 2004
29	14	"Pumpkin"	October 29, 2004
30	15	"1, 2, 3 Apple Tree"	October 30, 2004
31	16	"Windy Day"	October 31, 2004
32	17	"Russell Did It"	November 1, 2004
33	18	"Treasure"	October 2, 2004
34	19	"4-Part Harmony"	October 6, 2004
35	20	"Soft as Nana"	October 7, 2004
36	21	"Mud Puddle"	October 9, 2004
37	22	"Camp Wooka"	October 10, 2004
38	23	"Toad Meets Budgie"	October 14, 2004
39	24	"Mona-A-Go-Go"	October 15, 2004
40	25	"New Friends"	October 17, 2004
41	26	"Winter Wonderland"	October 20, 2004

== Production ==
The show was filmed in a building "reputed to be an old munitions factory" in the television production district of Liberty Village in Toronto, Ontario. The shorts were produced in 1998 & 1999.

== Broadcast and home media ==
Nanalan' first aired as one of the short series broadcast during program breaks on YTV's YTV Jr. block. In the United States, Nickelodeon's Nick Jr. block and its sister channel Noggin ran 21 of the 72 Nanalan' shorts beginning in 1999. Repeats of the shorts continued to air on Nick Jr. until late 2003, when the first full-length season began airing. International distribution for the shorts was handled by Sunbow Entertainment.

CBC premiered the full-length episodes beginning September 1, 2003 and aired the series until 2007. The show also aired in the U.S. on select PBS Kids stations from July 8, 2006 through 2013.

In 2004, Quality Special Products released a set of six DVDs and VHSes including selections of the three-minute shorts. The discs and were mainly sold in the U.S. Rather than simply Nanalan', the home media billed the show as Welcome to Nanalan': As Seen on Nickelodeon. The full-length seasons were neither released to DVD nor VHS.

The episodes were uploaded to YouTube in 2007 (but have since been deleted). In May 2023, an official YouTube channel for the show was created. Shorts and full-length episodes were uploaded weekly until February 2025.

== Reception ==
During its short run, the series received mostly positive attention from media critics, some of which felt that the show's bizarre and unconventional nature made it more appealing and watchable by viewers of all ages. Although, the demographic for the show is geared toward children ages 3 to 11 years old. The Toronto Star said that "the series' surprising sweetness, simplicity and humour strike a universal chord with both young adults and kids." Writers for the Windsor Star enjoyed its surreal approach to depicting early childhood, saying that "the creators have captured the essence of what it is to be three." A review from the Canadian newspaper Broadcast Week said that "it made me laugh out loud, even though I'm out of the target audience by more than a couple of decades."

=== Awards and nominations ===
In 2004, the series was nominated for the following three Gemini Awards: Best Performance in a Pre-School Program or Series; Best Writing in a Children's or Youth Program or Series; and Best Pre-School Program or Series. Nanalan' won Best Writing and Best Performance, and the award was shared by all of the puppeteers.

=== Cultural relevance ===
A particular scene from the show was uploaded to YouTube in August 2023, showing Nana singing "Who's That Wonderful Girl" while Mona is dressed in princess clothes. The clip amassed over 46,000 views and 1,400 likes in three months. This same clip was later reposted on TikTok, where it received more than 8 million plays, 1.5 million likes and inspired 615 other videos using the sound within a month.

== See also ==
- Mr. Meaty, Hopley and Shannon's second television series
