= Jamie Shannon =

Canadian actor

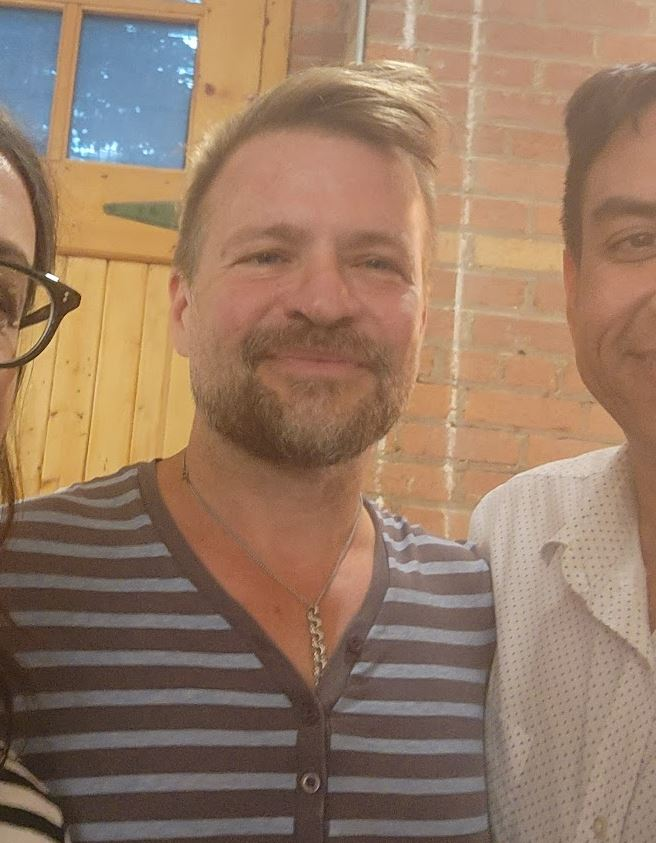
- Jamie Shannon at the Myseum of Toronto
- Born: Jamie Christopher Shannon; February 26, 1972 (age 54); Canada
- Occupations: Actor; puppeteer; director; screenwriter; producer
- Years active: 1989–present

Jamie Christopher Shannon (born February 26, 1972) is a Canadian actor, best known for his work in the Canadian television series Nanalan', as well as Ooh, Aah & You, and the Canadian-American television series Mr. Meaty.

== Career ==
Having worked together since teenagers, Shannon and his partner Jason Hopley founded The Grogs puppet company troupe in 1994. Shannon had first developed the idea for The Grogs while traveling in Europe and seeing the prominent place puppets have in street theater. He and Hopley then developed the puppets for children's birthday parties.

Shannon performed three-year-old Mona in the television series, Nanalan'. He is also known as the performer of 16-year-old Josh in Mr. Meaty and as Swami Jeff in Swami Jeff's Temple of Wisdom.

Shannon is co-creator of Mr. Meaty, along with Jason Hopley. As puppeteers, Shannon and Hopley also created all of the 'Mr. Meaty' puppets, from inception through construction to the final puppet characters.

Shannon's and Hopley's monkey puppets named Ooh and Aah began in early April 2007 as the new hosts of Playhouse Disney.

In the Nicktoons official website, in the Mr. Meaty videos section, there is a "Nick Extra!" where Jamie and Jason show you how to make your very own Mr. Meaty puppet.

=== Filmography ===
As actor

- Millennium (1989) as Young Bill Smith
- Stella (1990) as Teenage Heckler
- Hayseed (1997) as Gordie
- Nanalan' (1998–2004) as Mona
- Canadian Geographic Kids! (2003–2005) (TV series) as Jamie, host
- Mr. Meaty (21 episodes, 2005–2009) (TV series) as Josh Redgrove
- Swami Jeff's Temple of Wisdom (2008) as Swami Jeff (voice)
- Big & Small (27 episodes, 2008–2009) as Ruby and Twiba (voices, Canadian dub)

As puppeteer

- It's Alive! (1993–1997) (TV series)
- Swami Jeff (1993–1997) (TV series)
- Mr. Meaty (21 episodes, 2005–2009) (TV series)
- Big & Small (27 episodes, 2008–2009)
- Hotbox (7 episodes, 2009) (TV series)
- Higglety Pigglety Pop! or There Must Be More to Life (2010) (Short film)
- Lost Ollie (2022) (TV miniseries)

As director

- Nanalan' (2003) (TV series)
- Mr. Meaty (21 episodes, 2005–2009) (TV series)
- Swami Jeff's Temple of Wisdom (2008) (TV series)
- Big & Small (78 episodes, 2008–2011) (TV series)
- GIVER (9 episodes, 2013) (TV series)

As writer & producer

- Nanalan' (writer) (2003)
- Mr. Meaty (21 episodes, 2005–2009) (TV series)
- Swami Jeff's Temple of Wisdom (2008) (TV series)

== Awards and nominations ==
- 2004, Gemini Award win for 'Best Writing in a Children's or Youth Program or Series'
- 2004, Gemini Award win for 'Best Performance in a Pre-School Program or Series'
- 2004, Gemini Award nomination for 'Best Pre-School Program or Series'
