= G.A.S.P!! Fighters' NEXTream =

1998 video game

G.A.S.P. Fighters' NEXTream
- European box art
- Developer: Konami Computer Entertainment Osaka
- Publisher: Konami
- Platform: Nintendo 64
- Release: JP: March 26, 1998; PAL: September 1, 1998; NA: September 29, 1998
- Genre: Fighting
- Modes: Single player, multiplayer

G.A.S.P!! Fighters' NEXTream (ガスプ!! ファイターズ ネクストリーム, Generation of Arts, Speed and Power), known in North America as Deadly Arts, is a 1998 fighting game developed by Konami Computer Entertainment Osaka and published by Konami for the Nintendo 64. The story follows a series of fighters that have each received a mysterious letter to compete in a legendary contest, and about a champion that has disappeared. The story and the player profiles do not appear in the instructions for the North American version; except for the title, it is basically the same as the Japan and Europe versions, with slightly changed voice messages, and different character nameplates.

== Gameplay ==
The player can choose from one of the eight fighters in a match or "Duel". After beating the other seven characters and an identical version of themselves, there are two other opponents: Gouriki, a character wearing a cat mask and rope-like fairy wings, and Ohgami Reiji, the final boss that wears a large straw hat covering his eyes, and business suit. Reiji while fighting can change into one of two other characters: Hikari, an all-white humanoid with a third eye in his forehead, and Yami, a grey-skinned man with purple beard and long sideburns. The difficulty of the opponents can be changed from very easy up to expert, while the rounds and how long they last can also be manipulated. There is a Versus mode, for teaming up or one on one, as well as a create your own fighter option. Unlike most 3D fighting games, players receive points for how well they do, and the combination of moves they use. While creating their own characters, players can choose which type of body, height and such, then practice with the new characters in the training area to gain more moves. The player's game progress, scores, and created player can be saved onto Memory Paks, allowing the player to continue to try to improve their skills or challenge friends when playing on their Nintendo 64 console. There are 12 arenas in all, nine of which are available at the beginning of play and three unlockable ones. The two main boss characters also become playable after unlocking them. With Reiji, the two creatures can also be transformed into and used while playing.

== Development ==
The game was first unveiled at the September 1997 Tokyo Game Show.

Initially the game was to be released under the title G.A.S.P.!!: Fighters' NEXTream in all regions, but in early 1998 Konami decided to rename it Deadly Arts for the North American release.

== Reception ==
Reception

Aggregate score
Aggregator	Score
GameRankings	41%

Review scores
Publication	Score
Consoles +	81%
Edge	4/10
Electronic Gaming Monthly	1.75/10 (Note: Four critics of Electronic Gaming Monthly gave the game each a score of 1.5/10, 1/10, 2/10, and 2.5/10.)
Famitsu	19/40
Game Informer	3/10
GameSpot	3.4/10
Hyper	50%
IGN	3.2/10
N64 Magazine	(JP) 52% (EU) 47%
Next Generation	1/5
Nintendo Power	6.8/10

The game received unfavorable reviews according to the review aggregation website GameRankings. Matt Casamassina of IGN noted the "stale, sub-first-generation graphics, terrible control and detestable framerates." Jeff Gerstmann, writing for GameSpot, was similarly critical, concluding that the game was too basic and uninteresting. Next Generation said that the game was "not only a crappy fighting game but a sad excuse for a game in general. Bad graphics, bad control, and utterly generic designs all add up to an experience you'll want to miss at all costs." In Japan, Famitsu gave it a score of 19 out of 40. GamePro said that the game was "more dud-ly than deadly, and that's a shame because the only other new fighting game this season for N64 owners is Mortal Kombat 4." (Note: GamePro gave the game two 3/5 scores for graphics and control, and two 2.5/5 scores for sound and fun factor.)
