= English Teachers (TV series) =

Canadian documentary television series

- Genre: Documentary
- Created by: David Hansen
- Written by: David Hansen
- Directed by: David Hansen
- Country of origin: Canada
- Original language: English
- No. of seasons: 3
- No. of episodes: 29

Production
- Executive producers: Michael Snook; Clark Donnelly
- Producers: David Hansen; Maria Spinarski
- Production locations: Taipei, Taiwan
- Running time: 30 minutes
- Production company: WestWind Pictures

Original release
- Network: Life Network

English Teachers (aired internationally as Taipei Diaries) was a Canadian documentary television series. The series followed the lives of young Canadians teaching English to children in Taipei. The series aired on Life Network in the early 2000s. It was created, directed, written, and produced by the Canadian filmmaker David Hansen. The second and third seasons received positive reviews.

== Premise ==
The series followed the professional and personal lives of from five to six young Canadians teaching English as a Second Language in Taipei. The Canadian Press wrote that the documentary's subjects participated in filming "for a variety of reasons – to search for love, fulfil career aspirations, or ward off financial debt".

== Production and release ==
The series was created, directed, written, and produced by the Canadian filmmaker David Hansen; executive produced by Michael Snook and Clark Donnelly; and produced by Maria Spinarski and WestWind Pictures. The subjects were filmed around-the-clock and the raw footage was sent for editing in Regina, Saskatchewan, Canada. The series aired on Life Network and was distributed worldwide as Taipei Diaries by Portfolio Entertainment.

== Critical reception ==
The second and third seasons of the series received positive reviews. In The Toronto Star, the culture critic Vinay Menon said that second season was a "low-budget genius" in following the lives of the subjects and "shin[ing] an unflattering spotlight on the five's unworldly and often misguided impulses". By contrast, Will Chabun in the Regina Leader-Post wrote that second season made viewers identify with the struggles of the subjects. The second season also won the Golden Sheaf Award for Best Documentary Series at the 2004 Yorkton Film Festival. Andrew Ryan in The Globe and Mail called the third season "a welcome addition to the prime-time schedule".

== Seasons ==
The series aired for the following seasons:

- Season 1
- Season 2 – first aired 9 October 2003 on Life Network
- Season 3 – first aired 13 October 2004 on Life Network
