= Josette Normandeau =

Canadian kareteka

Josette Normandeau or Josette D Normandeau is a Canadian television producer and martial artist. She is well known in martial arts circles for the documentary programming that she has produced on various styles of martial arts. Normandeau is president of the production company, Ideacom International Inc.

She has produced several television programs and starred in the documentary series Deadly Arts (shown on FitTV in the U.S.), in which she travels around the globe to different countries exploring the various indigenous martial arts. In the series, she is often given exclusive access to martial arts masters and their training schools.

Josette holds black belts in both Shotokan Karate and Aikido. Although fluent in English, French is her first language.
