= List of programs broadcast by Discovery Family =

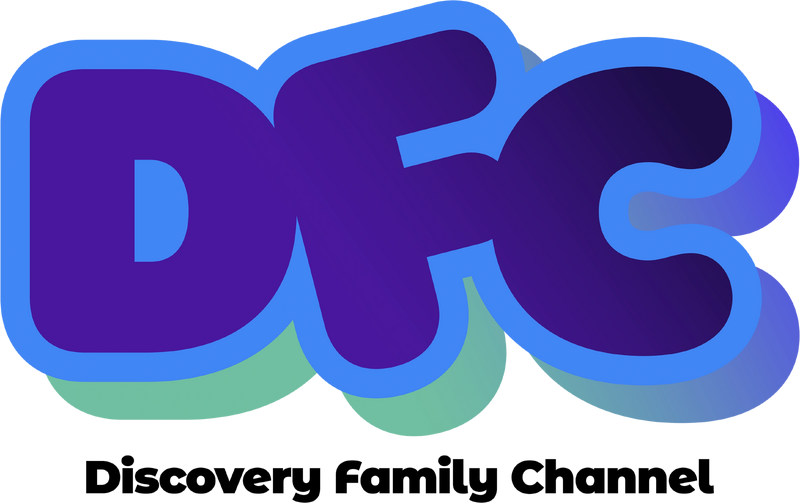
Discovery Family's current logo, currently used in tandem with the 2014 logo

This is a list of television programs currently and formerly broadcast by the U.S. cable television channel Discovery Family.

== Current programming ==
=== Acquired programming ===
==== Animated ====
| Title | Premiere date | Source(s) |
|---|---|---|
| Pound Puppies (Season 1 only) | October 10, 2010 | (Note: Produced under Hasbro Studios.) |
| My Little Pony: Friendship Is Magic | October 10, 2010 | |

==== Preschool ====
| Title | Premiere date | Source(s) |
|---|---|---|
| The Adventures of Chuck and Friends | October 15, 2010 | |
| Bubble's Hotel | January 24, 2026 | (Note: Produced under Epic Story Media.) |

=== Programming from Skydance Corporation ===
==== Animated ====
| Title | Premiere date | Source(s) |
|---|---|---|
| The Sylvester & Tweety Mysteries | May 6, 2023 | |
| The Smurfs | August 7, 2023 | |
| Summer Camp Island | July 1, 2024 | |
| Steven Universe | September 2, 2024 | |
| We Baby Bears | March 22, 2025 | |
| My Gym Partner's a Monkey | October 11, 2025 | |
| Scooby-Doo and Guess Who? | November 29, 2025 | |
| Be Cool, Scooby-Doo! | September 12, 2026 | |

==== Preschool ====
| Title | Premiere date | Source(s) |
|---|---|---|
| Baby Looney Tunes | May 1, 2023 | |
| Lucas the Spider | October 5, 2024 | |
| Batwheels | September 13, 2025 | |
| Bugs Bunny Builders | May 16, 2026 | |

=== Programming from other Skydance networks ===
| Title | Premiere date | Source(s) |
|---|---|---|
| America's Cutest | August 18, 2014 | |
| Too Cute | August 18, 2014 | |
| Cake Boss | October 16, 2014 | (Note: Ended but still airing reruns.) |
| Ultimate Cake Off | September 6, 2015 | |
| Bake It Like Buddy | September 8, 2018 | |
| Kids Baking Championship | December 4, 2018 | |
| My Lottery Dream Home | November 1, 2021 | |
| Mini Beat Power Rockers | April 5, 2025 | |
| Underdogs United | June 7, 2025 | |

== Former programming ==
This is a list of programs that have formerly aired on Discovery Kids (1996–present), Hub Network (2010–14), and Discovery Family (since 2014).

An asterisk (*) indicates that the program had new episodes aired on Discovery Family.

=== Original programming ===
==== Animated ====
| Title | Premiere date | Finale date | Date(s) rerun | Note(s) |
|---|---|---|---|---|
| Kenny the Shark | November 1, 2003 | February 19, 2005 | 2005–12; 2017–22 | (Note: First run ended in 2012 (The Hub). Reruns resumed from 2017 to 2022 (Discovery Family).) |
| Tutenstein | November 1, 2003 | October 11, 2008 | 2008–12 | (Note: Also aired on The Hub) |
| Time Warp Trio | July 9, 2005 | July 15, 2006 | 2006–11 | |
| Growing Up Creepie | September 9, 2006 | June 21, 2008 | 2008–11 | |
| The Future Is Wild | October 13, 2007 | July 5, 2008 | 2008–12 | |

==== Live-action ====
| Title | Premiere date | End date | Source(s) |
|---|---|---|---|
| Jaws & Claws | 1997 | 1998 | |
| No, Really! | 1997 | 1999 | |
| Pop-Sci | 1997 | 1999 | |
| The Adventures of A.R.K. | 1998 | 2000 | |
| Bonehead Detectives of the Paleoworld | 1998 | October 9, 2010 | |
| Mega Movie Magic | 1998 | 2000 | |
| Real Kids, Real Adventures | 1998 | 2000 | |
| Outward Bound USA | September 30, 1999 | January 5, 2003 | |
| Sci Squad | 1999 | | |
| Sail Away | May 26, 2001 | July 7, 2001 | |
| Discovery Kids Ultimate Guide to the Awesome | October 21, 2001 | November 6, 2004 | |
| Truth or Scare | October 27, 2001 | October 29, 2012 | |
| Prehistoric Planet | October 5, 2002 | February 28, 2010 | |
| Operation Junkyard | October 5, 2002 | February 15, 2003 | |
| Endurance | October 5, 2002 | July 21, 2013 | |
| Scout's Safari | October 5, 2002 | June 25, 2011 | |
| Strange Days at Blake Holsey High | October 5, 2002 | June 25, 2011 | |
| Zach's Ultimate Guide | 2003 | | |
| Adventure Camp | May 17, 2003 | March 25, 2012 | |
| Trading Spaces: Boys vs. Girls | May 17, 2003 | June 25, 2011 | |
| Jeff Corwin Unleashed | September 13, 2003 | January 24, 2004 | |
| Saving a Species | 2004 | January 20, 2008 | |
| Skunked TV | July 24, 2004 | August 1, 2004 | |
| Darcy's Wild Life | October 2, 2004 | February 28, 2010 | |
| Flight 29 Down | October 1, 2005 | December 24, 2011 | (Note: First ended on May 3, 2010. Also aired on The Hub from June 3, 2011 to December 24, 2011.) |
| A Year on Earth | December 3, 2006 | December 10, 2006 | |
| Bindi the Jungle Girl | June 9, 2007 | October 9, 2010 | |
| Dinosapien | July 7, 2007 | March 24, 2012 | |

==== Preschool ====
| Title | Premiere date | Finale date | Date(s) rerun | Note(s) |
|---|---|---|---|---|
| Animal Jam | February 24, 2003 | April 11, 2003 | 2003–07 | |
| Hi-5 | February 24, 2003 | October 6, 2006 | 2006–10 | |
| Paz | February 24, 2003 | November 25, 2006 | 2006–10 | |
| The Save-Ums! | February 24, 2003 | July 11, 2005 | 2005–07 | |
| Peep and the Big Wide World (Note: Seasons 1-3 only) | April 12, 2004 | September 14, 2007 | 2007–10 | |
| ToddWorld | November 8, 2004 | June 10, 2008 | 2008 | |
| Hip Hop Harry | September 25, 2006 | June 26, 2008 | 2008–10 | |
| Meteor and the Mighty Monster Trucks | September 25, 2006 | July 1, 2008 | 2008–10 | |

=== Acquired programming ===
==== Animated ====
| Title | Premiere date | End date | Source(s) |
|---|---|---|---|
| Tracey McBean | October 3, 2004 | September 28, 2007 | |
| Grossology | January 13, 2007 | June 26, 2011 | |
| The Twisted Whiskers Show | October 10, 2010 | February 28, 2014 | (Note: Produced under American Greetings.) |
| Dennis and Gnasher | October 10, 2010 | October 6, 2013 | |
| Cosmic Quantum Ray | October 10, 2010 | October 6, 2013 | |
| Atomic Betty | October 10, 2010 | December 29, 2013 | |
| Strawberry Shortcake's Berry Bitty Adventures | October 10, 2010 | May 31, 2020 | (Note: Also aired on Discovery Family) |
| Deltora Quest | October 10, 2010 | December 29, 2013 | |
| Men in Black: The Series | October 10, 2010 | June 1, 2012 | |
| Transformers: Generation One | October 11, 2010 | January 28, 2022 | |
| G.I. Joe: A Real American Hero | October 11, 2010 | May 30, 2022 | |
| Where on Earth Is Carmen Sandiego? | October 16, 2010 | September 2, 2012 | |
| Transformers: Prime | November 26, 2010 | November 28, 2025 | |
| G.I. Joe: Renegades | November 26, 2010 | January 4, 2015 | |
| Dan Vs. | January 1, 2011 | October 3, 2014 | |
| Jem and the Holograms | May 28, 2011 | November 15, 2015 | |
| Conan the Adventurer | May 31, 2011 | October 16, 2011 | |
| Secret Millionaires Club | October 23, 2011 | October 12, 2014 | |
| Transformers: Rescue Bots | December 17, 2011 | September 30, 2026 | |
| The Super Hero Squad Show | January 30, 2012 | January 29, 2015 | |
| Kaijudo | May 5, 2012 | October 12, 2014 | |
| Care Bears: Welcome to Care-a-Lot | June 2, 2012 | October 5, 2014 | |
| G.I. Joe: Sigma 6 | July 9, 2012 | February 28, 2014 | |
| Littlest Pet Shop | November 10, 2012 | March 20, 2026 | |
| SheZow | June 1, 2013 | January 31, 2016 | (Note: First run ended on October 4, 2014. Reruns resumed on November 22, 2015 and ended on January 31, 2016.) |
| Sabrina: Secrets of a Teenage Witch | October 12, 2013 | October 27, 2019 | |
| Teenage Fairytale Dropouts | May 31, 2014 | November 26, 2014 | |
| The Jungle Book | July 11, 2015 | March 25, 2018 | |
| Blazing Team: Masters of Yo Kwon Do | November 13, 2015 | May 31, 2022 | |
| The New Adventures of Peter Pan | June 5, 2016 | April 30, 2017 | |
| Robin Hood: Mischief in Sherwood | July 3, 2016 | December 17, 2017 | |
| Doki | August 5, 2016 | August 7, 2016 | |
| Zak Storm | October 14, 2017 | May 26, 2019 | |
| Littlest Pet Shop: A World of Our Own | April 14, 2018 | November 17, 2023 | |
| Hanazuki: Full of Treasures | December 1, 2018 | November 27, 2020 | |
| Transformers: Rescue Bots Academy | January 5, 2019 | March 26, 2023 | |
| Popples | July 1, 2019 | November 27, 2020 | |
| Pac-Man and the Ghostly Adventures | November 16, 2019 | August 27, 2023 | |
| My Little Pony: Pony Life | November 7, 2020 | December 30, 2023 | |
| S.M.A.S.H.! | February 18, 2023 | February 15, 2026 | |

==== Live-action ====
| Title | Premiere date | End date | Source(s) |
|---|---|---|---|
| Wild Guess | 1997 | 2001 | |
| Incredible Story Studios | 1999 | June 27, 2003 | |
| Popular Mechanics for Kids | January 1, 2001 | September 9, 2007 | |
| Screech Owls | February 8, 2001 | September 2, 2006 | |
| The Saddle Club | January 4, 2002 | March 24, 2012 | |
| Mentors | June 7, 2002 | September 3, 2006 | |
| Mystery Hunters | June 30, 2003 | October 9, 2010 | |
| Timeblazers | October 4, 2004 | June 24, 2011 | |
| Serious | January 2, 2006 | June 24, 2011 | |
| Crash, Bang, Splat! | January 7, 2006 | October 9, 2010 | |
| Family Game Night | October 10, 2010 | November 25, 2018 | |
| Pictureka! | October 11, 2010 | September 7, 2020 | (Note: Reruns ended on December 29, 2013. Also aired on Discovery Family.) |
| Honey, I Shrunk the Kids: The TV Show | October 11, 2010 | September 13, 2013 | |
| The Wonder Years | October 11, 2010 | August 31, 2012 | |
| Doogie Howser, M.D. | October 11, 2010 | May 26, 2013 | |
| Batman (1966) | October 11, 2010 | September 1, 2012 | |
| Taylor Swift: Journey to Fearless | October 22, 2010 | December 30, 2011 | |
| R.L. Stine's The Haunting Hour: The Series | October 29, 2010 | October 31, 2016 | |
| Hubworld | November 5, 2010 | October 29, 2011 | |
| The Game of Life | September 3, 2011 | May 30, 2019 | (Note: Regular reruns ended on June 30, 2014. Also aired on Discovery Family.) |
| Scrabble Showdown | September 3, 2011 | September 6, 2020 | (Note: Regular reruns ended on December 29, 2013. Also aired on Discovery Family.) |
| Goosebumps (1995) | September 6, 2011 | October 5, 2014 | |
| Are You Smarter than a 5th Grader? | September 19, 2011 | September 13, 2013 | |
| Majors & Minors | September 23, 2011 | May 26, 2013 | |
| Clue | November 14, 2011 | June 8, 2014 | |
| The Aquabats! Super Show! | March 3, 2012 | October 4, 2014 | |
| The Facts of Life | April 2, 2012 | March 22, 2013 | |
| ALF | June 4, 2012 | October 12, 2014 | |
| Sliders | September 3, 2012 | August 30, 2014 | |
| Hercules: The Legendary Journeys | September 3, 2012 | August 30, 2014 | |
| Ninja Turtles: The Next Mutation | January 12, 2013 | December 28, 2013 | |
| Who's the Boss? | April 1, 2013 | July 12, 2013 | |
| Wizards vs Aliens | May 27, 2013 | June 15, 2013 | |
| Spooksville | October 26, 2013 | October 12, 2014 | |
| Kid President: Declaration of Awesome | June 21, 2014 | October 5, 2014 | |
| Blossom | July 7, 2014 | December 23, 2016 | (Note: First run ended on October 12, 2014. Reruns resumed on April 2, 2016 and ended on December 23, 2016.) |
| Parents Just Don't Understand* | August 23, 2014 | November 30, 2014 | |
| Survival of the Weirdest | October 13, 2014 | November 17, 2014 | |
| Buying the Galaxy | October 14, 2014 | October 28, 2014 | |
| Extreme Engineering: Big Reveals | October 14, 2014 | November 18, 2014 | |
| That's Superhuman! | October 22, 2014 | November 19, 2014 | |
| Big, Bigger, Biggest: Supersized | October 28, 2014 | November 18, 2014 | |
| How the Earth Got Its Shapes | November 24, 2014 | | |
| Ocean Mysteries with Jeff Corwin | December 8, 2014 | July 5, 2015 | |
| Jesus: The Untold Story | December 26, 2014 | | |
| Ancient Case Files | January 2, 2015 | February 6, 2015 | |
| Explosive! | January 6, 2015 | January 27, 2015 | |
| Hand Made History | January 6, 2015 | February 24, 2015 | |
| Funniest Pets & People | January 8, 2015 | October 30, 2017 | |
| Dinosaurs: The Untold Story | March 16, 2015 | March 23, 2015 | |
| My Dog's Crazy Animal Friends | April 9, 2015 | May 14, 2015 | |
| The World's Most Outrageous Pets | April 9, 2015 | May 7, 2015 | |
| Horrible Histories (2015) | April 10, 2015 | February 26, 2018 | |
| Weird, Wild and Deadly | April 15, 2015 | May 20, 2015 | |
| American Family vs. Wild | June 3, 2015 | July 1, 2015 | |
| From Wags to Riches with Bill Berloni | August 6, 2015 | August 27, 2015 | |
| Animals LOL | August 7, 2015 | September 17, 2015 | |
| The Surprising Lives of Billionaires | September 2, 2015 | October 1, 2015 | |
| Babies Behaving Badly | September 4, 2015 | November 27, 2015 | |
| Why We Do Stuff? | September 4, 2015 | October 2, 2015 | |
| The Game Plane* | September 29, 2015 | March 22, 2016 | |
| Beasts Behaving Badly | October 16, 2015 | December 4, 2015 | |
| Lost & Found with Mike & Jesse | November 11, 2015 | January 3, 2016 | |
| The Great Christmas Light Fight | December 17, 2015 | December 25, 2016 | |
| Secrets of America's Favorite Places | July 3, 2016 | August 21, 2016 | |
| Game of Homes | September 6, 2016 | October 23, 2017 | |
| The Renovation King | September 6, 2016 | October 25, 2016 | |
| The Dengineers | January 3, 2017 | January 31, 2017 | |
| Post My Party | January 3, 2017 | January 31, 2017 | |
| Reno, Set, Go! | June 19, 2017 | November 13, 2017 | |
| Extreme Makeover: Home Edition | April 26, 2020 | September 25, 2022 | |
| The Ponysitters Club | September 5, 2020 | December 26, 2021 | |

==== Preschool ====
| Title | Premiere date | End date | Source(s) |
|---|---|---|---|
| Chicken Minute | October 7, 1996 | 1998 | |
| Brum | February 24, 2003 | December 31, 2006 | |
| The Magic School Bus | February 24, 2003 | February 28, 2010 | |
| Timothy Goes to School | August 30, 2004 | December 31, 2006 | |
| Balamory | September 5, 2005 | September 22, 2006 | |
| Wilbur | April 16, 2007 | June 25, 2012 | |
| Animal Mechanicals | October 11, 2010 | May 31, 2013 | |
| Maryoku Yummy | October 11, 2010 | May 31, 2012 | |
| In the Night Garden... | October 11, 2010 | October 6, 2013 | |
| The WotWots | October 11, 2010 | December 29, 2013 | |
| Bubu and the Little Owls | February 17, 2019 | December 26, 2020 | |
| Pirata & Capitano | June 16, 2019 | May 31, 2022 | |
| Luna Petunia | July 1, 2019 | November 27, 2020 | |
| The Polos | July 6, 2019 | September 6, 2020 | |
| Super Monsters | October 19, 2019 | October 11, 2024 | |
| True and the Rainbow Kingdom | August 2, 2020 | July 30, 2021 | |
| Petronix Defenders | October 15, 2022 | March 30, 2025 | |
| Hanni and the Wild Woods | April 1, 2023 | March 30, 2025 | |

=== Programming from Skydance Corporation ===
==== Animated ====
| Title | Premiere date | End date | Source(s) |
|---|---|---|---|
| Batman Beyond | October 10, 2010 | February 28, 2014 | |
| Batman: The Animated Series | September 6, 2011 | November 29, 2013 | |
| The New Batman Adventures | December 6, 2011 | November 11, 2013 | |
| Transformers: Animated | July 9, 2012 | February 28, 2014 | |
| Superman: The Animated Series | September 3, 2012 | February 28, 2014 | |
| Animaniacs (1993) | November 4, 2012 | October 10, 2014 | |
| Tiny Toon Adventures | July 1, 2013 | June 27, 2015 | |
| Paddington Bear | October 7, 2023 | September 29, 2024 | |
| Looney Tunes/Merrie Melodies | December 4, 2023 | November 30, 2024 | |
| Jabberjaw | September 14, 2024 | June 26, 2025 | |

==== Live-action ====
| Title | Premiere date | End date | Source(s) |
|---|---|---|---|
| Family Ties | October 11, 2010 | September 26, 2014 | |
| Happy Days | October 11, 2010 | September 26, 2014 | |
| Laverne & Shirley | October 11, 2010 | January 12, 2014 | |
| Sabrina, the Teenage Witch | April 2, 2012 | March 28, 2014 | |
| Mork & Mindy | April 2, 2012 | January 12, 2014 | |
| Lois & Clark: The New Adventures of Superman | June 3, 2012 | May 25, 2014 | |
| Step by Step | October 7, 2013 | October 12, 2014 | |
| Sister, Sister | March 3, 2014 | October 12, 2014 | |

==== Preschool ====
| Title | Premiere date | End date | Source(s) |
|---|---|---|---|
| Holly Hobbie & Friends | September 12, 2015 | March 4, 2016 | |

=== Programming from other Skydance networks ===
| Title | Premiere date | End date | Source(s) |
|---|---|---|---|
| Iris, The Happy Professor | October 7, 1996 | 1998 | |
| Kitty Cats | October 7, 1996 | 1998 | |
| Little Star | October 7, 1996 | 1998 | |
| Acorn the Nature Nut | 1997 | 2004 | |
| Buck Staghorn's Animal Bites | 1997 | 2001 | |
| Mother Nature | 1997 | 2001 | |
| Zooventure | 1997 | July 2, 2005 | |
| Bingo & Molly | 1998 | August 30, 2002 | |
| Pappyland | 1998 | February 21, 2003 | |
| Salty's Lighthouse | 1998 | February 21, 2003 | |
| Skinnamarink TV | 1998 | February 21, 2003 | |
| Ni Ni's Treehouse | September 25, 2000 | February 21, 2003 | |
| Lassie | 2000 | September 9, 2007 | |
| Croc Files | January 1, 2001 | June 23, 2008 | |
| Fraggle Rock | October 10, 2010 | October 4, 2014 | |
| Meerkat Manor | October 10, 2010 | March 24, 2012 | |
| Bad Dog! | August 17, 2014 | August 22, 2014 | |
| It's Me or the Dog | August 17, 2014 | August 22, 2014 | |
| The Incredible Food Race | September 7, 2016 | October 12, 2016 | |
| Undercover Boss | May 16, 2017 | November 28, 2018 | |

=== Short-form programming ===
| Title | Year(s) aired | Source(s) |
|---|---|---|
| Factoid | 1997–2003 | |
| What An Animal! | 1997–2003 | |
| Braintwister | 1998–2003 | |
| Double Take | 1998–2003 | |
| Laboratory | 1998–2003 | |
| Ready Set Learn Short Stuff | 1998–2003 | |
| Hugo Takes A D-Tour | 1999–2003 | |
| Kenny the Shark shorts | 2000–04 | |
| Mister Chi Chi's Guide To The Universe | 2000–03 | |
| My Little Pony Equestria Girls: Summertime Shorts | 2017 | |

== Programming blocks ==
=== Former ===
| Title | Year(s) aired | Source(s) |
|---|---|---|
| The Gaggle | 2001–05 | |
| Scary Saturday Night Sleepovers | 2001–06 | |
| Ready Set Learn! | 2003–10 | |
| Real Toons | 2003–09 | |
| Animal Afternoons | 2004–09 | |
| @DK | 2006–10 | |
| Hub Family Movie | 2010–14 | |
| HubBub | 2010–11 | |
| Hub Primetime | 2010–14 | |
| Huboom! | 2010–13 | |
| Haunted Hub | 2012–14 | |
| Discovery Family Movie | 2014–17 | |
| Discovery Family Movie Nights | 2017–19 | |

== Special programming ==
=== Specials ===
| Title | Premiere date | End date | Source(s) |
|---|---|---|---|
| My Little Pony: Equestria Girls | June 24, 2017 | July 8, 2017 | |

=== Films ===
| Title | Initial broadcast date | Source(s) |
|---|---|---|
| My Little Pony: Equestria Girls | September 1, 2013 | |
| My Little Pony: The Princess Promenade | August 8, 2014 | |
| My Little Pony Crystal Princess: The Runaway Rainbow | August 8, 2014 | |
| My Little Pony: Twinkle Wish Adventure | August 8, 2014 | |
| My Little Pony: Equestria Girls – Rainbow Rocks | October 17, 2014 | |
| My Little Pony: A Very Minty Christmas | December 13, 2014 | |
| My Little Pony: The Movie (1986) | April 4, 2015 | |
| My Little Pony: Equestria Girls – Friendship Games | September 26, 2015 | |
| My Little Pony: Equestria Girls – Legend of Everfree | October 1, 2016 | |
| My Little Pony: Equestria Girls – Forgotten Friendship | February 17, 2018 | |
| My Little Pony: Equestria Girls – Rollercoaster of Friendship | July 6, 2018 | |
| My Little Pony: Best Gift Ever | October 27, 2018 | |
| My Little Pony: Equestria Girls – Spring Breakdown | March 30, 2019 | |
| My Little Pony: Rainbow Roadtrip | June 29, 2019 | |
| My Little Pony: Equestria Girls – Sunset's Backstage Pass | July 27, 2019 | |
| My Little Pony: Equestria Girls – Holidays Unwrapped | November 2, 2019 | |
| Kong: King of the Apes | December 6, 2019 | |
| Tarzan and Jane: Genesis | December 13, 2019 | |
| Tarzan and Jane: Tale of Two Jungles | December 21, 2019 | |

== See also ==
- List of programs broadcast by Cartoon Network
- List of programs broadcast by Cartoonito
- List of programs broadcast by Adult Swim
- List of programs broadcast by Boomerang
- List of programs broadcast by Toonami
- List of programs broadcast by Nickelodeon
- List of programs broadcast by the Nick Jr. Channel
- List of programs broadcast by Nicktoons
- List of programs broadcast by TeenNick
- List of programs broadcast by Nick at Nite
