= List of programs broadcast by Citytv =

This is a list of television programs broadcast by Citytv, a Canadian television system owned by Rogers Media.

== Current programming ==
=== Original series ===
==== Drama ====
- Hudson & Rex (2019–present)
- Law & Order Toronto: Criminal Intent (2024–present)

==== Game shows ====
- The Price is Right Tonight (2026–present)

==== News programming ====
- CityNews (September 12, 1977–present)
- Breakfast Television (September 9, 1989–present)

==== Multicultural programming (Toronto) ====
- Café da Manhã
- Correio da Manhã em Destaque
- Eye On Asia
- Festival Italiano di Johnny Lombardi
- Gente da Nossa
- Panorama
- Polish Studio

=== American series ===
Show	Type	Original network	Aired since
2 Broke Girls (reruns)	Sitcom	CBS	2011–17; 2024
25 Words or Less	Game show	Syndication	2023
America's Got Talent	Reality	NBC	2010
American Idol	Reality	ABC	2021
The Bachelor	Reality	ABC	2002
The Bachelorette	Reality	ABC	2003
Bachelor in Paradise	Reality	ABC	2014
Beat Shazam	Game show	FOX	2017
Bob's Burgers (shared with CHCH; on demand with Hulu)	Animated comedy	FOX	2015–21; 2023
Brilliant Minds	Drama	NBC	2024
Celebrity Family Feud	Game show	ABC	2015
Chicago Fire	Drama	NBC	2019
Chicago Med	Drama	NBC	2019
Chicago P.D.	Drama	NBC	2019
Claim to Fame	Reality	ABC	2023
Dancing with the Stars (shared with Disney+)	Reality	ABC	2017–21; 2023
Dateline NBC	News magazine	NBC	2022
Don't Forget the Lyrics!	Game show	FOX	2022
Family Guy (shared with CHCH; on demand with Star)	Animated comedy	FOX	2015–21; 2023
Family Feud	Game show	Syndication	2014
Found	Drama	NBC	2023
General Hospital	Soap opera	ABC	2010
The Golden Bachelor	Reality	ABC	2023
The Golden Bachelorette	Reality	ABC	2024
Grimsburg (shared with CHCH)	Animated comedy	FOX	2024
Grosse Pointe Garden Society	Drama	NBC	2025
Impractical Jokers	Reality	TruTV	2021
The Irrational	Drama	NBC	2023
The Jennifer Hudson Show	Talk show	Syndication	2022–25
Jimmy Kimmel Live!	Talk show	ABC	2003–14; 2024
Judy Justice	Reality	Prime Video	2024
The Kelly Clarkson Show	Talk show	Syndication	2019–2026
Krapopolis (shared with CHCH)	Animated comedy	FOX	2023
Law & Order	Drama	NBC	2022
Law & Order: Organized Crime	Drama	NBC/Peacock	2021
Law & Order: Special Victims Unit	Drama	NBC	2021
Let's Make a Deal	Game show	CBS	2012
Lopez vs Lopez	Comedy	NBC	2022
Poker Face	Drama	Peacock	2023
Press Your Luck	Game show	ABC	2019
The Price Is Right	Game show	CBS	1978–1980s; 2012
The Simpsons (shared with CHCH; on demand with Disney+)	Animated comedy	FOX	2015–21; 2023
So You Think You Can Dance	Reality	FOX	2022
Storage Wars (reruns)	Reality	A&E	2024
That's My Jam	Game show	NBC	2022
Trivial Pursuit	Game show	CW	2024
The Twilight Zone (reruns)	Drama	CBS	2023
Universal Basic Guys	Animated comedy	FOX	2024

=== Children's programming (Saskatchewan) ===
- Chums
- Doowett
- Monkey See, Monkey Do
- Quizzine
- RoBotik (interstitial series)
- Stories of the North
- Why Am I?
- Wibbly Pig

== Former programming ==
=== Original series ===
- Awaaz E Punjab (Punjabi language program, June 1987 – August 1994)
- The Baby Blue Movie (softcore pornography)
- Barely Cooking (adult cooking show)
- The Bachelor Canada (Moved to W Network)
- Bazaar with Gene Taylor (talk/comedy)
- Black Community Mixtapes (2023)
- The Bletchley Circle: San Francisco (2018)
- Bollywood Masala TV
- Budweiser Stage at Home (2020)
- Canada's Got Talent (2012; 2022–2025)
- Canada's Next Top Model (2006–2007)
- Caribbean Variety TV
- City Lights (1973–1988)
- City Limits
- Cityline (talk show) (1984–2024)
- CityOnline (news talk show)
- Croatian weekly TV show "Hrvatski putokazi" (1974–1977)
- Dead Still (2020)
- Dharti Sohni Pakistan TV (Urdu and Punjabi language)
- Dil Dil Pakistan, named for the song "Dil Dil Pakistan"
- Discover Your World (adventure film, 1985 – 1987)
- Ed & Red's Night Party (variety show)
- Electric Circus (1988–2003)
- FashionTelevision
- Great Movies (banner for primetime films, 1970s–2000s)
- Greek Paradise
- Hello Japan
- Hockey Night in Canada
- Rogers Hometown Hockey
- Indo-Caribbean Visions
- Late Great Movies (banner for overnight films, 1980s–2000s)
- Life on Venus Ave. (1991–1996)
- LunchTelevision
- MediaTelevision
- Mehek: The Fragrance Of Pakistan (Urdu and Punjabi language, 1986–1992)
- Mix TV Russian
- More Great Movies (banner for afternoon films, 1990s)
- MovieTelevision
- The NewMusic (music video show)
- Not So Great Movies (banner for Sunday afternoon B-movies, 1980s–1990s)
- Ooh La La
- Package Deal (2013–2014)
- QT: QueerTelevision
- Relic Hunter (1999–2006)
- Sajri Sawer (Punjabi language Program)
- Seed
- SexTV
- Shahre Ma TV (Iranian culture)
- The Shulman File with Morton Shulman
- Sounds Of Asia (1984–1992)
- Speak Easy with Gene Taylor (talk/comedy)
- Speakers' Corner (social commentary)
- Star!News Weekend (entertainment)
- Startv (entertainment)
- Sunnyside (sitcom, 2015)
- Toronto Rocks
- tvframes
- VeraCity (2020)
- Vice on City (March 11, 2015 – 2016)
- Visions Of Punjab TV
- The War Years
- Young Drunk Punk (2015)
- Bad Blood (2017–2018)
- The Murders (2019)
- The Wedding Planners (2020)
- Wong & Winchester (2023)
- Fall in Love Fridays – Premieres of original films produced by Rogers and other companies domestically, mainly meant for the American Hallmark Channel.

=== Canadian syndicated series ===
- Beastmaster
- The Collector (2004–2007)
- First Wave (1999–2003)
- The Galloping Gourmet
- Glenn Martin, DDS (2009–2015)
- The Hilarious House of Frightenstein
- Kidsworld
- Lexx (1999–2003)
- Murdoch Mysteries
- Naked News
- Nirvanna the Band the Show
- Rocket Robin Hood
- Stargate SG-1 (2004–2008)
- Strange Paradise (1970s)
- Survivorman
- The Trouble with Tracy

=== American series ===
==== Drama ====
- American Whiskey Bar
- The Assets (drama)
- Battlestar Galactica (2006–2008)
- Bluff City Law (2019)
- Body of Proof (2011–2013)
- The Blacklist (2017–2018)
- The Carrie Diaries
- Catch-22 (2019)
- Chase (2010–2011)
- Chuck
- Cougar Town
- Council of Dads (2020)
- Crusoe (2008–2009)
- Easy Money (2008–2009)
- The Endgame (2022)
- The Event (2010–2011)
- Empire (2015)
- Four Weddings and a Funeral (2019)
- Fringe (2010–2013)
- The Gifted (2017–2019)
- Glee (musical comedy drama)
- Godfather of Harlem (2020)
- Killer Women (2014)
- Law & Order: Special Victims Unit (reruns)
- Law & Order: UK
- Lethal Weapon (2016–2019)
- Lipstick Jungle (2008–2009)
- Lucky 7 (2013)
- Manifest (2018–21)
- Men in Trees (2006–2008)
- A Million Little Things (2018–21)
- Nip/Tuck
- Parenthood (2010–2011)
- Person of Interest (2011–2013)
- Private Practice (2011–2013)
- Privileged (2008–2009)
- Quantum Leap (2022–24)
- The Quest
- Reaper (2007–2008)
- The Resident (2018)
- Revenge
- Roswell (2000–2002)
- The Republic of Sarah (2021)
- The Rockford Files (reruns)
- Ryan's Hope
- Scandal (2012–2015)
- The Secret Life of the American Teenager
- Smallville (2002–2005)
- Star Trek: Deep Space Nine (1993–2003)
- Star Trek: Enterprise (2001–2005)
- Star Trek: The Next Generation (1987–2001)
- Star Trek: Voyager (1995–2001)
- Supernatural
- Terra Nova (2011)
- Trauma (2009–2010)
- The Twilight Zone (2019)
- Undercovers (2010)
- Vagrant Queen (2020)
- Valentine (2008–2009)
- V.I.P. (1998–2000)
- The Whole Truth (2010)

==== Comedy ====
- 30 Rock (2009–2013)
- Accidentally on Purpose (2009–2010)
- America's Funniest Home Videos (2006–2008; 2010–2014)
- American Auto (2021–23)
- Ben & Kate (2012–13)
- Black-ish (2014–22)
- Bless the Harts (2019–21)
- Bordertown (2016)
- Brooklyn Nine-Nine (2013–21)
- The Cool Kids (2018–2019)
- Community
- Cougar Town (2009–2011)
- Duncanville (2020–2022)
- Enlisted (2014)
- Entourage (2008)
- Everybody Hates Chris (2006–2009)
- Extended Family (2024)
- FailArmy (2015–21)
- Friends (1997–2009) (reruns)
- Grand Crew (2021–23)
- The Great North (2021)
- Green Acres (1970s)
- Happy Endings (2011–2013)
- Happy Tree Friends (2008)
- How I Met Your Mother (2009–2015)
- The Jeffersons (reruns)
- Kenan (2021–22)
- Kröd Mändoon and the Flaming Sword of Fire
- The Last Man on Earth (2015–2018)
- Last Man Standing (2011–2013)
- Life in Pieces (2015-2019)
- The Lucy Show
- Malibu Country (2012–2013)
- The Middle
- Modern Family (2009–2019)
- Mom (2013–23)
- Mother Up!
- Mr. Mayor (2021–22)
- Murphy Brown (2018)
- My Three Sons (1970s)
- New Girl
- The Orville (2017-2019)
- Parks and Recreation (2009–2015)
- Perfect Harmony (2019–2020)
- Rachael Ray (Sept. 18, 2006–Sept. 2014)
- Raising Hope (2011–2014)
- Rel (2018–2019)
- Rules of Engagement (2010–2012)
- Scrubs (2009–2010)
- Seinfeld (1995–2004) (reruns)
- Sex and the City (1998)
- Shameless
- Single Parents (2018–2019)
- Son of Zorn
- Speechless (2017–2019)
- Spin City (2004–2005)
- Suburgatory (2011–2013)
- Super Fun Night (2013–2014)
- Supernanny
- That's My Bush! (2001)
- Two and a Half Men (reruns)
- Ugly Betty (comedy drama)
- Young Rock (2021–23)

==== Reality ====
- The 5th Wheel (2001–2004)
- 13: Fear is Real (2009)
- 60 Minutes (1978–1979)
- Access Hollywood (2006–2008)
- American Gladiators
- America's Next Top Model
- Banzai
- Beauty and the Geek (reality/competition)
- The Biggest Loser (2009–2012)
- Blind Date (1999–2004)
- Bring the Funny (2019)
- Capital One College Bowl (2021–22)
- Card Sharks (2019–21)
- Celebrity Fit Club (2008–2009)
- Celebrity Name Game (2014–2017)
- The Chase (2021–23)
- The Chew (2011–2018)
- The Cindy Margolis Show (2000)
- Daily Mail TV (2018–2022)
- The Doctors (2017–2022)
- Ellen (2004–2008)
- EP Daily (2009–2015)
- Extra
- Extreme Makeover: Home Edition (2009–2012)
- Extreme Weight Loss
- FBOY Island (2023)
- The Final Straw (2022)
- Girls Behaving Badly (2003–2004)
- Glam God (2008)
- Hard Copy
- Hell's Kitchen (2008–2024)
- The Howie Mandel Show (1998–1999)
- The Jay Leno Show (2009–2010)
- The Jamie Kennedy Experiment (2002–2004)
- Joe Millionaire (2003)
- The John Walsh Show (2002–2003)
- Judge Judy (2009–2014)
- Katie (talk show)
- Kaya (2008–2009)
- Labor of Love (2020)
- Maury (1997–2006)
- Match Game (1970s–1981)
- The Mike Douglas Show
- Mind Games (2014)
- National Enquirer TV (1999–2000)
- Opportunity Knocks (2008)
- The Oprah Winfrey Show (1987–1994)
- Ordinary Joe (2021–22)
- Paradise Hotel (2019)
- The People's Court (2021–23)
- The Phil Donahue Show
- The Prank Panel (2023)
- Pussycat Dolls Present (2007–2008)
- Reviews on the Run (2010–2014)
- Rock of Love with Bret Michaels (2008)
- Sex Wars (2000–2001)
- Stylista (2008)
- Tattletales (1970s)
- Temptation Island (2001–2003)
- The Tonight Show
- The World's Best (2019)
- World Poker Tour
- WWE Saturday Night's Main Event (2006)

=== Children's programming (Saskatchewan) ===
- The Adventures of the Aftermath Crew (2000–01)
- The Adventures of Dudley the Dragon
- The Adventures of Paddington Bear
- The Animals of Farthing Wood (2000–03)
- Anna Banana
- Are You Ready?
- Artbot
- Arthur
- Babar
- Backyard Bug Adventures (2002–05)
- Backyard Science (2004–05)
- Bananas in Pyjamas
- Ballooner Landing (1993–98)
- Ball Town
- Be Alert Bert (2000–03)
- Beezoo's Attic
- Bertie the Bat
- Between the Lions
- Belly Button Buddies
- Benjamin's Farm (2008–09)
- The Big Garage
- Boffins
- Boo!
- Bookmice (1995–99; 2001–05)
- Bright Sparks (1991–95)
- Budgie the Little Helicopter
- Bug City
- The Busy World of Richard Scarry
- The Caribou Kitchen (1997; 2000–05)
- CG Kids (2003–10)
- Charlie and Lola
- Chicken Minute (1997–2001)
- Cro
- Dino Dan
- Dinosaur Train
- The Dodo Club (1992–95; 1997)
- Doggy Day School
- Dream Street (2000–03)
- East of the Moon (1998–2001)
- The Electric Company
- Elliot Moose (2000–03)
- Eric's World
- Eureeka's Castle (1992–96)
- Eye of the Storm
- Faerie Tale Theatre (1992–96)
- Franny's Feet
- The Friendly Giant
- F.R.O.G.
- Fun Food Frenzy (2001–04)
- George Shrinks
- Get Outta Town (2005; 2007–08)
- Grandpa's Garden (2004–05)
- Groundling Marsh
- Harry and His Bucket Full of Dinosaurs
- Hello Mrs. Cherrywinkle (2000–04)
- Henry's Cat
- Here's How!
- Hi-5
- Hi Opie!
- The Hoobs
- I Dare You
- Incredible Story Studios (1998–2005)
- Inuk
- Iris, The Happy Professor (1994–2005)
- Johnson and Friends (1993–95)
- The Jungle Room (2007–11)
- The Kids of Degrassi Street
- Kids Planet Video (1998–2002)
- Kids@Discovery
- KidZone (1991–99)
- Kitty Cats
- The Koala Brothers (2005–11)
- Lamb Chop's Play-Along (1994)
- Lift Off
- Little Bear
- Little Robots
- Little Star
- Louis Says
- Maggie and the Ferocious Beast
- The Magic Library
- Magic Mountain (2000–01)
- The Magic School Bus
- Maisy
- Making Stuff
- Manon
- Martha Speaks
- Mathica's Mathshop (1995–99; 2001–05)
- The MAXimum Dimension (1999–2004)
- Maya the Bee
- Mighty Machines
- Minuscule
- Miss BG
- Moko: The Young Explorer
- Moomin
- Mr Majeika (1992–97)
- Mr. Moon
- Mustard Pancakes (2005–11)
- My Little Planet (1999; 2000–01)
- Nellie the Elephant
- Nelly and Caesar
- Noah's Island (2000–03)
- Noonbory and the Super 7
- Now You Know
- The Ocean Room
- Open Book
- Opie's Home
- Ozzie the Owl
- Paper, Scissors, Glue (2002–05)
- Paul Hann and Friends (1991–96)
- Paw Patrol
- PB Bear and Friends
- Pingu
- Pinky Dinky Doo
- Planet Echo
- Polka Dot Door (1991–96)
- Polka Dot Shorts (1997–2002)
- Poppy Cat
- Pop It!
- Popular Mechanics for Kids
- Prairie Berry Pie (2000–07)
- Press Gang (1993–98)
- The Prime Radicals (2011–13)
- The Puzzle Place (1998–2001)
- The Raggy Dolls (1994–95; 1997–99)
- Rainbow Fish
- Really Bend it Like Beckham (2004–05)
- Renegadepress.com (2004–05)
- Return to the Magic Library
- Ricky's Room
- Riddle of Wizard's Oak (1991–93; 1997–99)
- The Riddlers
- Rob the Robot
- Rockabye Bubble (2001–04)
- Rolie Polie Olie
- Sagwa, the Chinese Siamese Cat
- Salty's Lighthouse (2000–02)
- Sesame Street (1991–92)
- The Shelley T. Turtle Show
- Shining Time Station (2000–04)
- Sid the Science Kid
- The Silver Brumby (2000–03)
- Snailympics (2000–04)
- Space Stretch
- Spellz (2008–11)
- Spot
- Stuff
- Suzuki's Nature Quest (2001–02; 2004)
- SWAP-TV
- Taste Buds
- Teddybears
- Teletubbies (1999–2007)
- Teletubbies Everywhere (2003–07)
- Think Big
- This Is Daniel Cook
- This is Emily Yeung
- Timothy Goes to School
- Tiga Talk
- Tipi Tales
- Today's Special (1993)
- The Toothbrush Family (2000–01; 2003–04)
- Tots TV (1994–2004)
- The Toy Castle (2000–10)
- Tractor Tom (2003–05)
- Tumbletown Tales
- Twinkle Toes
- Vrrrooommm! (2000–03)
- Wapos Bay
- The Way Things Work
- What-a-Mess
- The Wind in the Willows
- Wishbone
- Why?
- Wonder Why?
- The World of David the Gnome (1993–98; 2002–07)
- A World Of Wonders
- Worzel Gummidge (1994–96; 1998)
- Worzel Gummidge Down Under (1996–97; 1999–2001)
- Yoho Ahoy
- Zoboomafoo
