= WCNY =

WCNY may refer to:

- WCNY-FM, a radio station (91.3 FM) licensed to Syracuse, New York, United States
- WCNY-TV, a television station (channel 20, virtual 24) licensed to Syracuse, New York, United States
- WNYE (FM), an educational FM station located in New York City which, as an Apex band station, was assigned the call sign WCNY from 1938 to 1939
- WWNY-TV, a television station (channel 7 analog/35 digital) licensed to Carthage, New York, United States, which was assigned the call sign WCNY from 1954 to 1965
