= Tom Broadbridge =

Australian film producer

Thomas Frederick Broadbridge (born 1943) is a British-Australian film producer.

== Early life ==
Broadbridge grew up in Grantham in England. He attended the Boys' Central School. His parents lived Grantham, and his sister Betty Allen lived in Manor Drive and Treadgold Avenue until her death at the age of 80. He moved to London where he met his wife Jackie.Great Gonerby.

== Career ==
He moved from Lincolnshire to build and an English style pub, The Angry Friar, in Gibraltar, then moved to Australia in 1973.

== Selected credits ==
=== Film ===
- Felicity (1979)
- Blood Money (1980)
- Dead Man's Float (1980)
- BMX Bandits (1983)
- Jenny Kissed Me (1985)
- Contagion (1987)
- Coda (1987)
- Kadaicha (1988)
- The 13th Floor (1988)
- Out of the Body (1988)
- To Make a Killing (1988)
- Never Cry Devil (1989)
- Prime Suspect (1989)
- Wishful Thinking (1989)
- Hidden Obsession (1992)
- Unlawful Passage (1993)

=== Television ===
- Crooked Mick (1979)
- Cornflakes for Tea (1988)
- Bingo & Molly (1997)
- The Visual Bible Series (1997)
- The Children's Animated Bible (2004)
