= Zoobilee Zoo =

Children's television series

- Cast of Zoobilee Zoo
- Developed by: Hallmark
- Presented by: Ben Vereen
- Opening theme: "Zoobilee Zoo" by Haim Saban and Shuki Levy
- Ending theme: "Zoobilee Zoo"
- Country of origin: United States
- Original language: English
- No. of episodes: 65 (plus three direct-to-video episodes)

Production
- Executive producers: Steve Binder; Jean Chalopin; Andy Heyward
- Producer: Mary Jo Blue
- Running time: 21–22 minutes
- Production companies: DIC Group Production; Hallmark Cards; SFM Media Corporation; BRB Productions

Original release
- Network: First-run syndication
- Release: September 15, 1986 – March 27, 1987

Zoobilee Zoo is an American children's television series featuring actors dressed as animal characters that originally aired from 1986 to 1987. It continued to run in syndication until 2000 on several television channels including commercial network television stations, PBS stations, The Learning Channel, and Hallmark Channel. The original 65 episodes are currently owned by Hallmark Properties and were produced by WQED Pittsburgh.

Hosted by Ben Vereen, the show revolves around a group of six creative animal friends who live in a magical land called Zoobilee Zoo. Each possess a unique artistic skill and they frequently break into song and dance.

== Plot ==
Each episode is opened by a greeting from host Ben Vereen, dressed as a spotted snow leopard, who plays the mayor of Zoobilee Zoo. Speaking directly to viewers that he refers to as "Zoobaroos", Vereen usually appears throughout each episode to summarize the main themes or to perform a song and dance.

The plot in each episode revolves around the main characters, called Zoobles, as they play together and encounter difficulties common to young children. The primary themes are cooperation, making friends, and creativity.

== Cast and characters ==
Each Zooble character has a certain artistic talent that shapes the way they approach different scenario:

- Sandey Grinn as Bill Der Beaver in all but two episodes, who likes to invent and fix stuff.
  - Michael Sheehan as the original Bill Der Beaver in two episodes. When Sheehan decided to leave the show for other interests (such as Jem), he was replaced by Sandey Grinn.
- Forrest Gardner as Van Go Lion, who enjoys art.
- Karen Hartman as Talkatoo Cockatoo, who enjoys reading, writing, and speech.
- Michael B. Moynahan as Lookout Bear, who enjoys adventuring and travel.
- Gary Schwartz as Bravo Fox, who enjoys performing.
- Louise Vallance as Whazzat Kangaroo, the youngest Zooble who encourages kids to enjoy music and dance.
- Ben Vereen as Mayor Ben, a snow leopard who stars as the host of the show explaining what kind of adventure the Zoobles will be having. Apart from the opening he rarely interacts with any of the other characters.

=== Minor characters ===
- Roger Behr as Limerick Leprechaun and Peter Possum
- Roger Peltz as Rhymin' Simon and the Genie
- Crosby the Dog as Crosby
- Suzy Gilstrap as Sandy
- Robert Shields as Elmo the Clown
- Patty Maloney as Ergo
- Helen Lambros as the Witch
- Vinson Crump as Vince
- Norman Merrill as Dr. Feelright
- Caleb Chung as Bert Backtrack

In addition, Grinn, Schwartz and Vallance have also played some minor characters. Schwartz played the gorilla in "A Camping We Will Go" (revealed in a blooper reel) and Grinn played Bravo's Vaudeville friend Charlie Google in "Vaudeville Star". Due to this, in the respective episodes, neither Bravo nor Bill appear. Vallance voiced Gilda the Tooth Fairy in "When You Wish Upon a Tooth Fairy".

== Background and production ==
Premiering on September 15, 1986, Zoobilee Zoo was produced and directed by Steve Binder. The show's concept was developed by Hallmark Entertainment, which partnered with children's production company DIC Enterprises.

In 1992, The Learning Channel picked up the show as part of its Ready Set Learn! lineup for preschoolers.

In 1997, Susan Doyle, Paul Lombardi, and Jack Solomon produced 40 four-minute music vignettes as "fillers" for PBS programming, but they were never broadcast. In 1998 the music from 36 of these 40 vignettes was distributed by Hallmark as two audio CDs: Go Zoobalistic and Zoomin' Along.

In 2000, a direct-to-video compilation of the 1997 40 four-minute music vignettes were repackaged and sold on commercial outlets such as eBay: That Fabulous Animal Band, Zooberific County Fair, and Zoobles Campout Tonight.

The stage show Zoobilee Zoo Live! toured briefly in 2000.

== Reception ==
Zoobilee Zoo was well-received critically, but earned only modest viewer ratings. It was praised by the National Education Association (NEA), the American Federation of Teachers and the National Association of Elementary School Principals. In addition, it was endorsed by the Action for Children's Television (ACT).

== Episodes ==
Episodes with an asterisk (*) contain Michael Sheehan as Bill Der Beaver. All other segments feature Sandey Grinn in the role.

1. A Star is Born
2. Two's A Crowd
3. Blue Ribbon Zoobles
4. Bravo, Come Home!
5. Land of Rhymes*
6. The Genie
7. When You Wish Upon a Tooth Fairy
8. The Robot Zoobles
9. Trading Places
10. The Great Trash Mystery*
11. Strike Up the Band
12. Mystery in Zoobilee Zoo
13. Popular Bill
14. The Cockatoo/Fox Report
15. Grown Up for a Day*
16. Winter Wonderland
17. Fox in Wolf's Clothing
18. Vaudeville Star
19. Is There a Doctor in the House?
20. Backwardville
21. Speak to Me, Bill
22. A Sticky Situation
23. To See or Not to See
24. Just in Time
25. Cave Zoobles
26. The Bear Behind the Badge
27. One Touch of Van Go
28. Job Hunting
29. The Great Game #1
30. Lookout, Super Zooble
31. Invisible Zooble
32. Lookout's Dog
33. Endangered Zoobra
34. Bravo's Puppets
35. The Witch's Spell
36. Talkerella
37. The Great Game #2
38. Van Go, Master Painter
39. The Ghost of Zoobilee Woods
40. Pigment Puzzle
41. Whazzat the Clown
42. The Great Zooble Tryouts
43. Gotta Dance
44. Close Encounters of a Zooble Kind
45. Laughland
46. Lady Whazzat
47. The Zooble Book of Records
48. Sing Along #1
49. The Magic Ring
50. A Trip to Memoryland
51. The Zooble Hop
52. Attack of the Giant Potatoes
53. The Teleportation Machine
54. Simon and the Leprechaun
55. Pictures to Remember
56. Smart Dummy
57. The Zoobadoobas
58. Sing Along #2
59. Without a Sound
60. Bill Sees Stars
61. A Time for Laughs
62. A Camping We Will Go
63. Surprise, Surprise
64. Bravo's Party
65. Piano Man Bill

== Awards and recognition ==
The series was awarded the 1987 Daytime Emmy for Outstanding Costume Design.

== See also ==
- New Zoo Revue
