= Join In! =

Canadian children's television series

- Created by: Jed MacKay
- Directed by: Doug Williams (seasons 1–2); Wayne Moss (seasons 3–6)
- Starring: Marty Brier; Pamela Sinha; Rudy Webb; Mishu Vellani
- Voices of: Rob Cowan; Maxine Miller; Billy Van
- Composer: Jed MacKay
- Country of origin: Canada
- No. of seasons: 6

Production
- Producer: Jed MacKay
- Production location: Lindsay, Ontario
- Running time: 28:50 minutes
- Production company: TVOntario

Original release
- Network: TVOntario
- Release: 1 November 1989 – 1995

Join In! is a Canadian educational children's television show which aired on TVOntario between 1989 and 1995. It was created and produced by Jed MacKay, who also wrote all of the show's original songs.

== Premise ==
Each episode had a number of elements woven into the plot line that invited its audience to "Join In!"; in games, songs, puzzles, or stories. The cast also broke the fourth wall, talking to the camera, and thus the audience, as if they were right there on set. The songs broke away from the usual children's format, offering a wide variety of rhythm and styles. The cast also sang live on each show.

== Characters ==
The series revolved around three adults named Jacob Bennett, Nikki, and Zack, who shared a studio loft together. After the second season, Nikki moved away and was replaced by Kia.

In a typical episode, the three would be planning for some kind of play or production that would usually involve Nikki being in charge of music and sound, and Jacob and Zack would be in charge of the set, lighting, costumes, etc. when some form of problem would arise.

The show also featured a toy wizard named Winston, his wife Emmelina, and their dog Abra, who lived on a windowsill in the loft.

== Cast ==
- Marty Brier as Zack
- Rudy Webb as Jacob Bennett
- Pamela Sinha as Nikki (season 1)
- Mishu Vellani as Kia (season 2–6)
- Rob Cowan as Winston (voice), a toy wizard living on the trio's windowsill.
- Maxine Miller as Emmelina (voice), a toy and Winston's wife.
- Billy Van as Abra (voice), Winston and Emmelina's toy dog.

== Crew ==
- Producer – Jed MacKay
- Directors – Wayne Moss, Doug Williams
- Composer – Jed MacKay
- Music Director – Bruce Ley

== Production ==
The show was filmed in Lindsay, Ontario. The first two seasons were directed by Doug Williams, and the next four by Wayne Moss. The cast was multi-racial, with two "minority" cast members.

== Broadcast ==
Join In! originally aired in Canada on TVOntario, and was sold for U.S. broadcast to the TLC network in October 1992 along with fellow production Bookmice. Airing after the latter, it was the second series on TLC's preschool block, Ready Set Learn!, on 28 December. Previously, Join In! had aired on the Vision Interfaith Satellite Network from 1990 to 1993.

== Reception ==
The series won the Alliance for Children and Television's Best Pre-school Program Award, and was also a finalist three times for the Gemini Award for Best Pre-school Program.
