= Wilbur (TV series) =

- Created by: Kim Anton; Tracey Hornbuckle; Jill Luedtke
- Voices of: Julie Lemieux; Emma Pustil; Ian Busher; Taylor Barber
- Opening theme: "Books are moo-ve-lous"
- Ending theme: "Books are moo-ve-lous" (instrumental)
- Country of origin: Canada
- Original language: English
- No. of seasons: 1
- No. of episodes: 26 (52 segments)

Production
- Running time: 30 minutes
- Production companies: Mercury Filmworks; Chilco Productions; EKA Distribution; Egmont Imagination

Original release
- Network: CBC
- Release: October 30, 2006 – November 27, 2009
- Release: April 16, 2007 – March 21, 2008

Wilbur is a Canadian live-action/puppet animated children's television series for preschoolers that debuted in the Kids' CBC block of CBC Television on October 30, 2006. In the United States, it first aired on the Ready Set Learn! block (as the very last program to ever premiere on the block) on Discovery Kids on April 16, 2007, later moving to TLC starting on April 23, 2007, airing until March 21, 2008.

Produced by Mercury Filmworks in association with Chilco Productions, EKA Distribution and Egmont Imagination, it focuses on an anthropomorphic calf and his friends as they solve problems by reading books with each other. 26 episodes (52 segments) were produced.

== Plot ==
Wilbur has an episode with a basic formula: at first, Wilbur and his friends would encounter a problem. After this, Wilbur gets a wiggling sensation which prompts him to read a book that guides the group in solving their problem by singing a tune and short dance. The book in question is usually an animated original story or retelling for the purposes of the show, told in rhyme, and often features Wilbur and his friends in various roles.

After the story is read, the group discusses their problem and a possible idea which usually fails. Thinking that the solution is still inside the book, they decide to read through a second time, this time, with clips showing children reciting the line "Once upon a time" at the beginning, retelling the story in their own words, and finishing by saying "The end". Afterwards, Wilbur and his friends try again, this time, with an idea that works. They reflect on how the story inspired their solution, to which Wilbur ends the episode by saying his catchphrase, “Books are Moooo-velous!”.

== Characters ==
- Wilbur the Calf (voiced by Julie Lemieux): The host and protagonist of the series. His barnyards serves as the platform for adventure, stories, songs, games and laughs with his friends. When Wilbur is faced with a problem, he wiggles as a sign that he’ll find the answer in the world of books and reading. His most famous phrase is, “Books are moo-velous.”
- Dasha (voiced by Emma Pustil): A brave, curious and inquisitive duck who loves exploring around her. She is seldom barefoot, but she normally wears a pair of shoes (as do her storybook counterparts).
- Ray (voiced by Ian Busher): A rooster with an exaggerated personality.
- Libby (voiced by Taylor Barber): The youngest member of the group. She is a lamb who only mentions simple phrases related to the context. She is the only character who speaks in third person (excluding her storybook counterparts) and with a toddler's lisp. Libby can be impatient and sensitive, but is reassured by her friends that the solution is not far away.

== Episodes ==
No.	Title	Original release date
1	"Sensational Wilbur / Pizza Dasha"	October 30, 2006 (Canada) / April 16, 2007 (U.S.)
"Sensational Wilbur": Wilbur is having lots of trouble catching his friends in a game of Blind Man's Bluff until he reads a book called, "Finding Home", and learns to use his other senses to help play a 'sensational' game. "Pizza Dasha": Dasha really wants to make pizza, but she doesn't know how.
2	"A Swingin' Time / The Big Barnyard Show"	April 17, 2007 (U.S.)
"A Swingin' Time": Dasha is having a great time on the tire swing, and apparentely too great to give anyone else a turn on it. Wilbur's storybook about magic shoes shows her how to share the fun with friends. "The Big Barnyard Show": The barnyard is abuzz with excitement and everyone is practicing for the big show.
3	"Wilbur's Wobbly Bed / Wiggly Fun!"	April 18, 2007 (U.S.)
"Wilbur's Wobbly Bed": Wilbur just loves his comfy old bed, except it has developed a serious wobble and clunk. A storybook gives Wilbur a great idea. "Wiggly Fun!": Ray can't wait to show his buddies his hilarious can of wigglers, but he keeps interrupting what his friends are doing.
4	"Mysterious Sound / Growing Pains"	April 19, 2007 (U.S.)
"Mysterious Sound": There's a really mysterious sound keeping the buddies awake! Ray jumps to the wrong conclusion until Wilbur's book shows them that it's a good idea to check the facts. "Growing Pains": Dasha is upset she has grown out of her favorite rubber rainboots.
5	"Dasha's New Friend / Ray Loses His Crow"	April 20, 2007 (U.S.)
"Dasha's New Friend": Dasha is very upset because her caterpillar friend Carly has disappeared. Dasha and Wilbur learn from a storybook that Carly isn't gone, she's just changed into a beautiful butterfly. "Ray Loses His Crow": Ray's favorite weather vane has disappeared and he feels upset and frustrated.
6	"Wish You Were Here / Sheep Shape"	April 23, 2007 (U.S.)
"Wish You Were Here": Ray wishes he could have fun at a Mexican fiesta, but he can't go to Mexico. With the help of Wilbur's storybook, his friends bring the fiesta to him. "Sheep Shape": Libby can't do what her bigger buddies can do and she doesn't like being too small.
7	"Can't Wait / Bubbles for Libby"	April 24, 2007 (U.S.)
"Can't Wait": Ray is bringing a surprise and Libby can't wait! Wilbur's book shows them that finding something fun to do while waiting will make the waiting easier. "Bubbles for Libby": Libby is so dirty and smelly that her friends are very unhappy and don't want to play with her.
8	"Rhyme Time / The Sound of Moosic"	April 25, 2007 (U.S.)
"Rhyme Time": Dasha wants to play a rhyming game, but is having lots of trouble until Wilbur's book helps by showing her how to rhyme, then nothing can stop her. "The Sound of Moosic": The Barnyard Buddies have taken all the musical instruments and are rockin' out with glee.
9	"Rain Dance / Milk and Sandwiches"	April 26, 2007 (U.S.)
"Rain Dance": It's raining and Ray is not happy since he doesn't like the rain. Wilbur's storybook about dancing cowboys turns Ray into a disco king, as he learns he can even enjoy a rainy day. "Milk and Sandwiches": A huge mound of hay bales is in Dasha's way and is way too heavy to move.
10	"Libby's Picnic / Squeaker Come Home"	April 27, 2007 (U.S.)
"Libby's Picnic": Libby has never been on a picnic and refuses to go until she learns from a storybook about a Princess' picnic, just how much fun they can be. "Squeaker Come Home": Wilbur can't seem to find his favorite squeaky toy anywhere.
11	"Libby's Bubbles / High Slide"	April 30, 2007 (U.S.)
"Libby's Bubbles": Libby blows the biggest bubble ever, but then it pops. Wilbur's book helps to make her feel better by showing that while some things that you make won't last, you can always make another one. "High Slide": Libby wants to go down the slide, but she is too afraid!
12	"Scarecrow / Oh Solo Moo"	May 1, 2007 (U.S.)
"Scarecrow": Something has scared Libby, and the buddies see that it is just the scarecrow. Wilbur's storybook helps Libby see for herself that a scarecrow isn't scary, except to crows. "Oh Solo Moo": Wilbur is stacking milkcans and wants to do it by himself.
13	"Hay Day / Wilbur's Camp Out"	May 2, 2007 (U.S.)
"Hay Day": It's a sack race and everyone is having fun except Dasha, she wants to win the race every time. Wilbur's storybook shows that having fun is the best part. "Wilbur's Camp Out": The buddies are loving camping under the stars until night noises keep Ray and Wilbur awake.
14	"Getting into Shapes / The Wright Stuff"	September 10, 2007 (U.S.)
"Getting into Shapes": Wilbur and Ray set up the Great Shapes Game and invite Libby to play. She needs some help and help comes from Wilbur's book. "The Wright Stuff": Wilbur wants to know what it feels like to fly. A story about the Wright brothers inspires Wilbur.
15	"Ray's Socks / Spilled Apples"	September 11, 2007 (U.S.)
"Ray's Socks": Ray can't play tag without his pink polka dot socks. A story called 'Same Way Rene' shows Ray that trying new ways can be fun. "Spilled Apples": Dasha is determined to move a really heavy basket of apples all by herself. Wilbur's book shows it's OK to ask for help.
16	"Leaf It to Dasha / Hay Fever"	September 12, 2007 (U.S.)
"Leaf It to Dasha": Dasha is upset when the leaves start changing color-it means her favorite season of summer is over. "Hay Fever": The buddies set up to play croquet but first they need to sweep up the hay. Libby just wants to play.
17	"Wilbur's Nap / Broken Toy"	September 13, 2007 (U.S.)
"Wilbur's Nap": Wilbur is very sleepy and needs a nap, but his buddies keep making so much noise he can't sleep. "Broken Toy": Ray has built a beautiful model plane which Dasha accidentally breaks and is too afraid to speak up since she thinks Ray will be angry at her.
18	"Two Reds Are Better Than One / Thanks for Everything"	September 14, 2007 (U.S.)
"Two Reds Are Better Than One": The buddies are playing Little Red Riding Hood and Wilbur is the wolf, but Dasha and Libby are having arguments since they both want to be Red at the same time. "Thanks for Everything": Ray wonders why Dasha doesn't say thank you when he helps her.
19	"Funny Dress-Up Night / All That Glitters"	November 23, 2007 (U.S.)
"Funny Dress-Up Night": Costumes abound but Dasha hasn't found one and the party is about to start! A story about silly hats shows Dasha that she can use her imagination to make up a costume. "All That Glitters": Ray has ordered a fancy new 'Ultra Sphere' better than Wilbur's plain ball.
20	"Snowflake Festival / Snowbuddies"	November 26, 2007 (U.S.)
"Snowflake Festival": Dasha can't wait to get presents, it's the best part of the Festival. Wilbur suggests that giving is also fun. "Snowbuddies": Snow is falling and it's perfect for building snow buddies. The decorations don't quite work until Wilbur reads a story about a great stew.
21	"Friendship Day / Repeat After Me"	February 11, 2008 (U.S.)
"Friendship Day": The buddies are making friendship day cards and Libby wants to sign her name but can't do it since she hasn't learned to yet. "Repeat After Me": Dasha wants to repeat the sounds that Wilbur is making on his drums. It is too hard until they read a story that shows them how to make it much easier.
22	"Sheep Need Sleep / Libby's Marbles"	March 17, 2008 (U.S.)
"Sheep Need Sleep": Libby is having so much fun, she wants to stay up and play all night instead of going to sleep. "Libby's Marbles": Wilbur and Ray accidentally slip on the marbles Libby has left on the floor.
23	"The Fence / The Magic Word"	March 18, 2008 (U.S.)
"The Fence": The buddies each want to paint a fence their favorite color. They have arguments over which color the fence should be until Wilbur's story about sky painters shows them how they make a rainbow using their favorite colors. "The Magic Word": Ray wants to show off his new crow to his friends, but becomes bossy and dislikes it when he can't get his way until he learns to ask nicely.
24	"Libby's Apples / On Dasha's Pond"	March 19, 2008 (U.S.)
"Libby's Apples": Libby wants to bring three apples for she, Wilbur and Dasha, but she doesn't know what three means. "On Dasha's Pond": It's winter in the barnyard and the buddies are skating on the frozen pond. Unfortunately, Libby shows up in a bathing suit and she wants to swim.
25	"Spring Egg Hunt / Spring Bees"	March 20, 2008 (U.S.)
"Spring Egg Hunt": Wilbur has hidden an egg for each of his friends while Libby has trouble finding hers. "Spring Bees": Dasha is very upset when she only sees blossoms on the cherry tree and there are no cherries yet.
26	"Wilbur's Birthday / Me First, You First"	March 21, 2008 (U.S.)
"Wilbur's Birthday": It's Wilbur's birthday and Wilbur is very excited, except he can't find his friends. He decides to have his birthday by himself until his friends show up. "Me First, You First": The buddies want to be first on the swing and on the slide. Wilbur's book about a band of merry men gives them an idea.

== Production ==
The franchise existed as a series of videotapes produced in 1997. A pilot for Wilbur was produced by Cuppa Coffee Studios in 2001. Production of the series later began in 2006.
