= Pappyland =

- Directed by: Jon Nappa (1993); MariRae Dopke (1995-1997)
- Presented by: Michael Cariglio
- Theme music composer: Todd Hobin; Doug Moncrief
- Composers: Todd Hobin; Doug Moncrief; Michael Curley
- Country of origin: United States
- Original language: English
- No. of seasons: 5
- No. of episodes: 73

Production
- Executive producer: Eric J. Roberts
- Producers: Marilyn Arnone; MariRae Dopke; Jon Nappa (1993)
- Production locations: PCI Recording Studio, Rochester, New York (1993); WCNY Studios, Liverpool, New York (1995-1997)
- Cinematography: Emmitte Budge; Tim Mazzacua; Steve Parton; Steve Strathmann; Brian Walls; John Walsh
- Running time: 30 minutes

Original release
- Network: PBS Member Stations (1993–1996); TLC (1996–1997); Spacetoon
- Release: 1993 – 1997

Pappyland is an American half-hour children's television series written by Jon Nappa and broadcast on WCNY-TV in Syracuse, New York, and other PBS stations from 1993 to 1996. Thereafter, the show was moved to TLC and began airing new episodes on its Ready Set Learn! block from September 30, 1996, until 1997, with reruns airing until February 21, 2003.

== Production ==
The show starred cartoonist-artist Michael Cariglio as Pappy Drew-It, an artist/49er-type character who lived in a house very reminiscent of Pee-wee's Playhouse. The show takes place in the title location of Pappyland, a magical world with many different creatures and people. More than 30 half-hour episodes were written by children's writer Eric J. Roberts, who also served as executive producer. Children's author Benette Whitmore wrote 35 episodes and introduced the character, Doodle Bug. More than half of the show was shot on a bluescreen.

== Format ==
During each half-hour segment, Pappy and other characters danced, sang, and taught life lessons, in addition to other children's television fare, but the main focus of the show was watching Pappy draw pictures. The camera was positioned directly above his paper, and he would carefully explain the purpose of each technique used. The purpose was for children viewers to be able to follow along with Pappy and create the same image as he did. Beginning with the second season, a selection of viewers who sent in their artwork had their drawing shown during the "Hall of Frames" segment near the end of the show and the closing credits. The show was distributed for broadcast on public television by WCNY in Syracuse, New York; it was produced by the non-profit Craftsman & Scribe's Creative Workshop and Creative Media Solutions TV, also based in Syracuse, New York. Writer for 35 episodes was Benette Whitmore. Home viewers were asked to mail their drawings to a post office box in Syracuse. Years later, Michael Cariglio hosted Inspiration Station on Smile of a Child TV. Pappyland is now available on DVD. The series can be viewed on a digital streaming device Roku's Family TV channel.

== Characters ==
- Pappy Drewitt (portrayed by Michael Cariglio) is an artist and host of the series who loves to draw. He wears a hat, suspenders, glasses, a green bandana, yellow shirt, and khaki pants; similar to the appearance of a forty-niner. The theme song suggests that he drew Pappyland, He lives in Pappyland and has many friends who also live there. A running gag in the series was that whenever he colored the picture he drew earlier in the episode, he would break a crayon. Almost every time this happened, Pappy would remark "Whoops. Pappy broke a crayon." This was done so Pappy could teach kids that they do not have to throw away a crayon just because it breaks. On occasion, when he colored in the picture, he also went outside the lines, thus teaching kids that it is all right to go outside the lines when coloring. In the original VHS, he was portrayed as a hillbilly. To get to various places in Pappyland, Pappy makes use of different modes of transportation like the Pappy Pad Express, the Much More Door, the Wishing Wheel, the Pappyscope, and the Color Copter.
- Elmer (performed by Joe Cariglio) is an old, wisecracking, and sometimes grumpy man who sits in a rocking chair in front of Pappy's desk. He tells a lot of jokes to Pappy. He also works at the Pappy Mines. At the beginning and end of mostly every episode, he would shout "Hey, sonny! Don't you know what time it is?", indicating that it was time to say hello to everyone, and that it was time to leave. He smoked a pipe in the original VHS.
- Binky is a talking paintbrush who originally lived in the Brushlands, but later moved to Pappy's cabin. He likes to paint pictures.
- Lily (performed by Marilyn Arnone) is a talking flower who originally lived in a flower field, but later moved to a windowsill in Pappy's cabin. After she moved to the windowsill, Pappy would give her some water from a watering can at the beginning of most episodes.
- Grandpappy Drewitt (also played by Cariglio) is a painting of Pappy's grandfather and Snacker Jack's uncle. He also appeared in the original VHS.
- Belle (performed by Marilyn Arnone) is a talking telephone who lives in Pappy's cabin starting in the second season. She speaks with a Southern accent and sometimes delivers news to Pappy, usually when someone is in trouble.
- Color Copter is a sentient biplane/helicopter that would serve as Pappy's modes of transportation alongside the Pappy Pad Express, the Much More Door, the Wishing Wheel, and the Pappyscope. The Color Copter tends to speak in some episodes.
- Mailbird (performed by Ted Long) is a bird who was introduced in the show's second season in 1995. He speaks with an English accent and delivers mail and often makes crash landings when doing so. He also works at the LetterLands Post Office. He was very disorganized, but Pappy later helped him get organized.
- Sing-A-Song Sam (portrayed by Michael Curley; June 20, 1958 - April 11, 2024) is a singer and pianist who in most episodes sang a song about the lesson learned in the episode.
- Buddy Bear (performed by Ted Long) is a bear who loves honey. He lives in a cave known as the Hamlet in Pencil Point. Like Pappy, he likes to draw and would sometimes draw for the home viewers in situations where Pappy encountered a problem he could not get out of.
- Chucky Woodchuckles (performed by Chris Grom) is a woodchuck who lives in a wooded area in Pappyland called Woodchuckles Place. He is very friendly but tended to lose things he borrowed from others, such as Pappy's crayons. Pappy taught him about responsibility.
- Tree-O are a group of three trees that lived in a forest. Their names are Oakie, Birchwood and Miss Maple. They did not appear in later seasons, as they were replaced by Woody.
- Woody is a tree that lived at the entrance of Pappyland. He once thought he had no friends, but Pappy cheered him up by drawing a picture of him. He appeared in the original VHS, and sang the song "Did You Ever Wanna Be" to Grandpappy. He is the only character besides Pappy, Elmer, and Grandpappy to appear in the actual show, but he did not appear until later episodes.
- Pumpkin Pop and Pumpkid are father and son pumpkins that originally lived in the Pappyland Grand Garden but later lived on a cart next to Woody.
- Turtle Lou (performed by Gabriel Velez) is an Italian anthropomorphic turtle who lives in a grass hut by a river on the path to Pencil Point called Turtle Lou's Landing. He likes to fish. He originally appeared to look like a non-anthropomorphized regular turtle and was known as "Turtle Louie".
- Doodle Bug (performed by Marilyn Arnone) is a bug who was introduced in the third season in 1996. He tries to stump Pappy by doodling something for Pappy to finish. Pappy, however, always wins. In the Season 4 episode "The Day Pappy Forgot How to Draw", Doodle Bug stumped Pappy with a doodle for the first time. After Pappy recovered, Doodle Bug did a different doodle for him, and Pappy actually completed it. He and his Doodle family lived in the Doodle Dunes of Pappyland.
- Donkey Dan is a donkey that lives in a stable at the barnyard.
- Duggan is a small parrot who appeared in a few episodes. He is usually unjustifiably angry and sometimes violent towards the other residents of Pappyland. A drawing or soothing talk from Pappy often placates him, but more often he uses it as an excuse to criticize Pappy.
- Fur Bear was a skinny bear who lived in Pappyland in the original VHS during Grandpappy's days. He spent his whole hibernation riding an elephant.
- McBride was a pirate who lived in Birmingham in a bottle in the original VHS. He is currently searching for his pirate captain, Captain Jack.
- Fishface was a mean-spirited fish that Pappy eventually won over with his kindness and drawing. He lived in the lake near Turtle Lou and did appear in later episodes.
- Snacker Jack Drewitt is Pappy's city cousin and Grandpappy's nephew who appeared in the Season 3 episode "Snacker Jack and the Snack Attack". At first, all he eats is junk food, but Pappy talks him into eating healthy food.
- Uncle Tony is Turtle Lou's uncle who appeared in the Season 5 episode "Turtle Lou visits Italy".
- Wanda is a woodpecker who lived at Woodchuckles Place with Chucky and only appeared in Season 1 in 1993.
- Songbirdie is an animated bird who appeared in Season 1 in 1993.
- Flutterby is an animated butterfly who appeared in Season 1 in 1993.
- Elizabeth Tricase is Buddy Bear's pen pal who is hearing impaired and appeared in the Season 2 episode "Pappy Talks with his Hands".
- Eloise is Elmer's twin sister who appeared in two episodes of Season 2 which aired in 1995.
- Color Taker or C.T. for short, is a selfish bully resembling a vacuum cleaner who lived in the Color Mountain and was on the loose to eat all the colors out of Pappyland in the Season 3 episode "The Day Pappyland Lost Its Color". Pappy did a drawing to show Color Taker that being a bully is not the best way to get what he wants. Pappy then activated a switch on Color Taker to bring back the colors to Pappyland and the two became friends. Then Pappy flew in his Color-Copter to take Color Taker back to Color Mountain where he could eat all the colors he would want inside the mountain.
- Mya (portrayed by Kali Deleo) is a Pappyland fan with a big imagination who appeared in the Season 5 episode "Pappyland's Mixed Up Day".
- Mrs. Pappy (portrayed by Michele Cariglio Finnerty) is Pappy's wife, imagined by Mya, who appeared in the Season 5 episode "Pappyland's Mixed Up Day".
- YoYo (portrayed by Ronald Cain) and Kriggs (portrayed by Robert Krigbaum) are circus clowns who appeared in the Season 5 episode "Buddy Bear Joins the Circus".
- Patsy (portrayed by Lori Ann Lesmeister) and Eddie (portrayed by Thomas Rhett Kee) are Hollywood producers who appeared in the Season 5 episode "Hollywood Comes to Pappyland".
- The Pappy Imposters (portrayed by Bill Neer, Patrick Bader and Dennis Calkins) are auditionees who were auditioning for the role of Pappy, appeared in the Season 5 episode "Hollywood Comes to Pappyland".
- Santa Claus (portrayed by J.P. Crangle) appeared in the Christmas special "A Pappyland Christmas".
- Hans and Fritz are Santa's elves who appeared in the Christmas special "A Pappyland Christmas".

== Episodes ==
=== Season 1 (1993) ===
1. Tree O Shares The Sunlight - Oakie, Miss Maple and Birchwood argue over who is getting the most sunlight until they learn about sharing.
2. Chucky Loses His Toothbrush - Chucky Woodchuckles is upset about losing his toothbrush.
3. I'm Not a Turtle, I'm a Rock - Turtle Lou thinks he is a rock, but he is a turtle after all since Pappy tells him that it is okay to be yourself.
4. Faithfulness - Lily learns about faith.
5. Pumpkid Grows Patience - Pumpkin Pop and Pappy teach an impatient Pumpkid about patience and taking one's time to enjoy growing.
6. Donkey Dan Gets A Special Visit - Donkey Dan learns a valuable lesson about commitment.
7. Buddy Bear Learns About Love - Pappy teaches Buddy Bear about the different kinds of love.
8. First Things First for Binky - Binky the Brush learns a lesson about setting priorities.
9. Wanda The Woodpecker's Rude Day - Wanda the Woodpecker learns all about obedience after being rude to Pappy.
10. Turtle Lou Gives Some Respect - Pappy learns about respect.
11. Lily Loves Her Friends - Lily tells Pappy that she loves her friends. Even though their personalities and looks may be different, they still enjoy being friends.
12. Pumpkin Pop Keeps His Word - Pumpkid is worried that Pumpkin Pop will not keep his word and take him to the Pumpkin Party.
13. Donkey Dan's Goofy Giggles - Pappy catches a case of the giggles from Donkey Dan.
14. Buddy Bear Wakes Up to Work - When Buddy Bear falls asleep while chopping wood, Pappy takes the opportunity to explain the importance of diligence.
15. Binky Brushes Up His Confidence - Binky the Brush is discouraged because he thinks Pappy's drawings are nicer than his.
16. Miss Maple Leaves Her Kindness - Miss Maple learns the importance of kindness after ordering the noisy Flutterby and Songbirdie to leave the forest.
17. Wanda the Woodpecker Won't Forgive Chucky - Wanda the Woodpecker learns about forgiveness.
18. Turtle Lou Comes Out of His Shell - Turtle Lou learns to be brave.
19. Forget Me Not Forgets She's Special - Forget Me Not learns that it is okay to be special.
20. Pumpkid Makes A Mistake - Pumpkid makes a mistake by leaving the pumpkin patch without permission. Then, he learns a lesson in telling someone where they're going before leaving and admitting mistakes.
21. Donkey Dan's Disorganization - Donkey Dan's disorganization prevents him from fitting inside his stable.
22. Staying Fit (later reworked as "Buddy Bear Gets A Honey Of A Belly") - Pappy teaches Buddy Bear to stay healthy and fit by eating good foods and exercising.
23. Binky Thinks Through a Picture - After Binky the Brush learns the value of thinking things through, he is able to paint a picture he likes.
24. Fishface Pressures Chucky - Chucky learns to stand up for himself after Fishface dares him to jump in the pond.
25. Turtle Lou's Missing You, Thank You
26. Tree-O's Noisy Forest - Tree-O and friends cannot stop talking all at once, so Pappy gets their attention by drawing a picture about the importance of listening and cooperating.

=== Season 2 (1995) ===
1. Elmer's Birthday Party Mystery - Elmer is nowhere to be found on the day of his surprise birthday party. (Song: "Concern")
2. Chucky Wins at Having Fun - Turtle Lou teaches Chucky Woodchuckles that there is more to competition than coming in first. (Song: "Competition")
3. Chucky Learns to Keep Trying - Chucky Woodchuckles gets a lesson in perseverance while learning to read. (Song: "Stick to it")
4. Pappy Talks With His Hands - When Buddy Bear's hearing-impaired pen pal visits, he is concerned he will not be able to talk with her. (Song: "We Can Talk With Our Hands")
5. Donkey Dan Gets a Case of the Jittery Nerves - Donkey Dan learns ways to cope with his nervousness over his inability to dance. (Song: "Shrink It")
6. Buddy Bear and Turtle Lou Trade Places - Buddy Bear and Turtle Lou disagree over which path to take for their walk together. (Song: "Pretend You're Me")
7. Eloise and Elmer Compliment Each Other - Elmer learns about giving and accepting approval from his visiting sister. (Song: "Compliments")
8. Turtle Lou Gets a Package - Turtle Lou is inattentive to his friends' attempts to tell him about a package that was delivered for him. (Song: "Listen Up")
9. Chucky Plants Some Clover - Chucky Woodchuckles lacks the confidence to plant clover around his place. (Song: "Confidence")
10. Turtle Lou and Buddy Bear Play Fair With Chucky - Chucky Woodchuckles wants to play checkers with Buddy Bear and Turtle Lou. (Song: "Fairness")
11. Donkey Dan and Buddy Bear Cook Up An Idea - Donkey Dan and Buddy Bear learn that using your imagination is lots of fun. (Song: "Celebration of Imagination")
12. Turtle Lou Minds His Manners - Pappy helps Turtle Lou polish his manners. (Song: "POLITE")
13. Fishface and Turtle Lou Talk Things Through - Fishface and Turtle Lou learn that talking things through helps solve problems. (Song: "Talk It Out")

=== Season 3 (1996) ===
1. The Case of the Lost Watercolor Set - Chucky Woodchuckles loses a watercolor set he borrowed from Mailbird. (Song: "Other People's Stuff")
2. I'm Not a Good Enough Artist - Buddy Bear thinks his painting is not as good as everyone else's artwork. (Song: "Your Impression is Expression")
3. Pappy's Imaginary Space Adventure - Inspired by a drawing of an alien, the gang takes an imaginary space journey with the cabin as their spaceship. (Song: "Flying By The Moon")
4. Did You Ever Want to Be... - A letter from a would-be artist sparks an adventure in which everyone learns to be the best they can be. (Song: "Did You Ever Wanna Be")
5. Turtle Lou's Lucky Sneakers - Turtle Lou's friends help him to do his best even though he has lost his lucky sneakers before a race. (Song: "Community Hop")
6. The Day Pappyland Lost Its Color - A selfish bully named the Color Taker is on the loose and is sucking all the color out of Pappyland. (Song: "The Ballad of Color Taker")
7. Would You Be Woody's Friend? - Woody mistakenly thinks his friends visit him only because they cannot avoid him. (Song: "Dear To Me")
8. Buddy Bear's Bad Dream - Everyone learns to face their fears after a thunderstorm knocks out the lights and Buddy Bear has a bad dream. (Song: "Makebelieve Monsters Can't Bite")
9. Mailbird Gets Organized - Mailbird needs help getting organized after he starts delivering mail to the wrong people. (Song: "Get Organized")
10. It's OK to Be Different - Buddy Bear's reluctant to send a picture of himself to his pen pal until he learns it is OK to look different. (Song: "Different Colors")
11. The Search for the Secret Treasure - Elmer discovers a treasure map that leads to the secret of creativity. (Song: "Look Into Your Heart")
12. Pappy's Creative Camping Adventure - Pappy teaches his pals how to open up to the world around them during a camping trip. (Song: "Plan to Prepare")
13. Snacker Jack and the Snack Attack - Pappy's cousin, Snacker Jack, learns how his bad eating habits affect his health and his creativity. (Song: "Super Snack Attack")

=== Season 4 (1997) ===
1. Pappy's Wild West Adventure - Pappy and the gang imagine themselves in the Wild West and learn about preparation by facing the Doodle Dude (played by Doodle Bug). (Song: "High Noon")
2. Pappy's Alphabet Drawing Adventure - Pappy gets a letter from Mailbird which prompts him to teach the children how to draw cartoons from the letters of the alphabet. (Song: "ABC Rap")
3. The Power Pappy Adventure - Pappy arrives at the cabin where Elmer is watching Power Pete. (Song: "Imagination Adventure")
4. The Day Pappy Forgot How to Draw - Pappy shocks everyone when he announces he has forgotten how to draw. (Song: "It's In The Mirror")
5. Doodle Bug's Music Recital - Doodle Bug practices the saxophone for his music recital and learns the importance of how practice makes you better. (Song: "Just Doodle Doodle Do It")
6. Mailbird's Special Delivery Route - Mailbird learns how to find the best route to deliver the mail. (Song: "If You Have A Plan, You Can")
7. The Best Doodler In The Land - Doodle Bug deluges Pappyland with doodles when he thinks he has been forgotten on Special Awards Day. (Song: "It's What I Love To Do")
8. Grandpappy's Day for Drawing - Pappy tells the story of when Grandpappy was the Pappy in Pappyland. (Song: "A Big Old Tree")
9. Pappy's Drawing with Numbers Adventure - Pappy draws things using numbers. (Song: "As We March Along")

=== Season 5 (1997) ===
1. Trouble at the Pappyland Art Festival - Doodle Bug causes havoc at the Pappyland Art Festival and learns a lesson on why it is not a good idea to steal other people's ideas. (Song: "Variety Is Grand")
2. Pappy's Teeny Tiny Adventure - Pappy is shrunk down to insect size, leaving everyone concerned. (Song: "Keep Your Faith")
3. Pappyland's Mixed Up Day - It's a mixed up day in Pappyland causing lots of chaos and mischief. (Song: "Mixed Up Day")
4. Lost In Pappyland - While on a nature walk, Pappy, Chucky, Turtle Lou, and Buddy get lost and learn the importance of sense of direction. (Song: "The Way Back Home")
5. Chucky Gets Amnesia - Chucky thinks he's a king and Pappyland is his court when he gets bopped on the head with an apple. (Song: "Chucky, Come Back")
6. The Big Whopper - Doodle Bug accidentally breaks a special sculpture that Pappy has made on the day of the "Hall of Frames" exhibit. (Song: "True Friends")
7. Turtle Lou Visits Italy - Turtle Lou travels to Italy to visit his Uncle Tony and they take in all the sights. (Song: "Old Friends, New Friends")
8. A Giant Pappy Adventure - Pappy gets a new perspective of Pappyland when he magically becomes a giant. (Song: "It Depends on Your Point of View")
9. Double Trouble In Pappyland - Pappy meets a duplicate of himself, which confuses everyone. Through it all, they learn about cooperation. (Song: "Cooperation")
10. Buddy Bear Joins the Circus - Buddy Bear has a chance to join the circus but knows he will miss everyone in Pappyland. (Song: "Tribute to Buddy")
11. Hollywood Comes to Pappyland - Two movie producers try to turn Pappyland into another glitzy Hollywood. (Song: "I Love Pappyland")
12. A Pappyland Christmas - Everyone awaits Santa at Christmas. (Songs: "I Can't Wait for Christmas" and "The Christmas Gift of Love")

Note that there may be more episodes

== Pap's ArtVentures ==
A sequel series continuing the character of Pappy and his adventures with his pals and kids on the show. It debuted on October 22, 2019, on Michael Cariglio's YouTube channel.
