= Ready Set Learn! =

American preschool television block

- 2003–2010 logo (featuring Paz the Penguin)
- Network: TLC (1992–2008); Discovery Kids (2003-2010)
- Launched: December 28, 1992; 33 years ago
- Closed: October 8, 2010; 15 years ago
- Country of origin: United States
- Owner: Discovery Communications
- Format: Weekday morning preschool block
- Running time: 6 hours (1992–2003, TLC; early 2000s, Discovery Kids); 5 hours (late 2000s, Discovery Kids); 3 hours (2003–2008, TLC)
- Original language: English

Ready Set Learn! was an American television block that was broadcast from late 1992 until 2010 across the Discovery Communications-owned TLC and Discovery Kids networks. A cable competitor to PBS's children's offerings, it broadcast twice on weekday mornings and comprised three hours of original, imported, and rerun programming in addition to music videos geared towards preschoolers. In its early years, it was hosted by children's entertainer Rory Zuckerman, who was billed mononymously; an early 2003 relaunch replaced her with Paz, a penguin who was represented in animated and puppet form.

A 1990 Carnegie Foundation report inspired Discovery to develop the block; shows were selected based on their educational value and visual vibrancy. Amid a $10 million investment from TLC, a line of home video and software releases, and plans to spin it off into a standalone channel, the parent company used Ready as a loss leader to expand the network's carriage. A counterpart for older children debuted on the main Discovery Channel in early 1997. By mid-2002, the TLC block ended up under the management of Discovery Kids, whose schedule it also appeared on.

Ready Set Learn! ran on TLC from December 28, 1992 to September 26, 2008, with Discovery Kids following suit during the 2000s. Despite brief skepticism on its chances as an "educational television" outlet, it was positively reviewed during both its 1990s and 2000s incarnations. The block helped TLC receive a CableACE Creators Award in 1995, and was also honored by the National Education Association, the American Academy of Children's Entertainment, and the Parents' Choice Foundation.

== History ==
"Kids don't just sit and watch, they play along and learn at home."

— Tagline from TLC's pre-launch pitch video for the block

The TLC network's foray into preschool television, Ready Set Learn! was first mentioned as early as August 1992. Of the first five shows announced for the block, three of them (Bookmice, Kitty Cats, and The Magic Box) would have their U.S. premieres there; the other two were rerun packages of Join In! (previously on the religious VISN network) and Zoobilee Zoo (a previously syndicated production of DIC Entertainment and Hallmark). Greg Moyer, Discovery Communications' senior vice-president of programming, expressed hope that a full-fledged channel would spin off from it within one or two years of launch. The Big Comfy Couch made its official U.S. television debut on TLC as a cornerstone of the preschool lineup on March 2, 1993.

According to TLC employee John Ford, the block was inspired by Ready to Learn: A Mandate for the Nation, a 1990 Carnegie Foundation report which stated that 35% of U.S. children began their education unprepared. Assisted by director of programming Mike Quattrone (who had previously undertaken similar endeavors at PBS), Ford selected the shows on the strengths of their educational value along with their visual vibrancy. Finding it "extremely well-produced", he also bet on Kitty Cats as the block's breakout series.

Ready Set Learn! debuted on December 28, 1992, with Iris, The Happy Professor rounding out the six-show lineup. A competitor to the PBS lineup, its three-hour schedule aired twice on weekdays, first at 6:00 a.m. and again at 9:00 a.m. (in the Eastern Time Zone)—a slot that Ford viewed as "a safe haven". TLC chose to air it commercial-free because doing otherwise would detract from its purpose. As such, Discovery used the format as a loss leader for expansion of the network's carriage, which stood at 18 million homes at the time. According to the Associated Press, TLC invested $10 million in the block's initial development (excluding tentative fees from underwriting, a supplement that never came to fruition); original programming was also planned.

In its early years, Ready Set Learn! was hosted by children's entertainer Rory Zuckerman (billed simply as "Rory"). A resident of Bethesda, Maryland (where TLC's parent company Discovery was based), Rory set out to teach children language skills through her music, as well as to "welcome the children into the world of The Learning Channel and also the parents, care-givers and other viewers" as hostess. The block would become the home of her own shows, Rory and Me and Rory's Place, which were seen by one million combined viewers per month in 1996.

Interstitial material on the block was branded under the "Short Stuff" banner, and rounded out each half-hour. Around 1994, music videos began appearing during this feature, starting with clips from Joanie Bartels (an artist signed to Discovery's former in-house record label). By 1996, TLC played 10–12 videos per day on Ready—showcasing children's artists as varied as Fred Penner, Parachute Express, Joe Scruggs, and Sharon, Lois & Bram—to the point where they would all but replace the older "Short Stuff" segments from 1992. The latter group would later headline the mainline Ready program Skinnamarink TV. Around 1992, the Discovery Channel began plans for a counterpart weekend block to Ready. After a four-year delay, it was launched on Sundays in early 1997 alongside the companion U.S. and Latin American Discovery Kids formats.

By mid-2002, the TLC block had come under the purview of the Discovery Kids team; a revamped lineup that tentatively included Animal Jam, The Save-Ums!, and Ni Ni's Treehouse was slated to take effect early the following year. The resulting relaunch on February 24, 2003 introduced Paz the Penguin as the new host of the interstitial segments; the 9:00 a.m. repeat moved to Discovery Kids. Paz, created by Irish author Mary Murphy, was seen in both puppet and animated forms; Discovery's Marjorie Kaplan saw him as "the avatar for his audience, the optimistic, persistent learner we want each of our viewers to be", and with his introduction, "hop[ed] for a 'less hyper, more unified programming environment.'" The Magic School Bus, a 1990s PBS staple, bookended the revised three-hour stretch. During Ready's last few years, new programs on the block premiered on Discovery Kids a week ahead of TLC.

The final TLC airing of Ready Set Learn! occurred on September 26, 2008, with Bigfoot Presents: Meteor and the Mighty Monster Trucks and The Magic School Bus in its closing hour. From that point on, reruns of TLC's remaining programs for older audiences occupied its timeslot. By then, the Discovery Kids version was airing from 9:00 a.m. till 2:00 p.m.; it evolved into HubBub after the network's October 10, 2010 rebranding as The Hub. As part of a cross-channel preview campaign leading up to The Hub's debut, TLC briefly returned to family-oriented entertainment with an airing of the Hasbro game show Family Game Night.

== Reception ==
Almost three weeks before its launch, the Hartford Courant was skeptical on whether the original Ready Set Learn! could succeed as "educational television", writing, "What children will learn first and foremost from this 'unprecedented' offering is how to watch TV, something they will master all too soon without TLC." The block managed to premiere to positive press; Peggy Charren of Action for Children's Television approved of its commercial-free nature, while a reporter for the Northwest Florida Daily News said, "From what I've seen, they're doing a pretty good job [at making television a teacher]." Lynne Heffley of The Los Angeles Times favorably reviewed the 2003 relaunch, citing Hi-5 (a U.S. remake of an Australian format) and The Save-Ums! as the standouts. "All the new shows are colorful, watchable and scrupulously created with the principles of child development firmly in mind," she said. "Several feature characters who talk directly to viewers, in the tradition of the best children's programming."

In October 1993, Ready Set Learn! helped TLC secure one of that season's five Golden CableACE nomination slots; upon its return in 1994–95, the block received a CableACE Creators Award. During its original run, it was also honored by the National Education Association and the American Academy of Children's Entertainment. In 2005, the relaunch era's Paz segments won a Silver Parents' Choice Award.

== Merchandise ==
A merchandising line for Ready Set Learn!, featuring coloring books and videotapes, was actively considered from the time of its planning stages. Discovery chose Professor Iris to represent the first products under the brand—first through three VHS collections in August 1993, and then through two CD-ROM titles, Fun Field Trip: Animal Safari in November 1994 and Seaside Adventure in May 1995. By the twilight of the block's tenure (during 2006–2008), DVD releases of select shows went through Genius Products.

== Programming ==
Title	Premiere date	Country of origin	Notes	Source(s)
Bookmice	December 28, 1992	Canada	Produced by TVOntario	
Join In!	December 28, 1992	Canada	Produced by TVOntario	
Zoobilee Zoo	December 28, 1992	United States	Rerun of DIC Entertainment/Hallmark series	
Professor Iris	December 28, 1992	Canada	Produced by Desclez Productions	
The Magic Box	December 28, 1992	New Zealand	Created by educator Wendy Pye	
Kitty Cats	December 28, 1992	Canada	Originally produced in Quebec French as Pacha et les chats	
Rory and Me	September 19, 1994	United States	Starring block's eponymous presenter; Taped at Atlantic Studios in Northwest Washington, D.C.; Retitled Rory's Place in 1996	
Chicken Minute	September 25, 1995	Canada	Created by Ronnie Burkett; tapings began in Montreal in 1991	
Little Star	September 25, 1995	Canada	Produced by Desclez, Société Radio-Canada, and Ravensburger	
Pappyland	September 30, 1996	United States	Originally shown on Syracuse PBS affiliate WCNY	
The World of David the Gnome	September 30, 1996	Spain	Produced by BRB International; English dub by CINAR and Miramax; Previously broadcast on Nick Jr.	
Wisdom of the Gnomes	November 5, 1996	Spain	Produced by BRB International	
Madison's Adventures: Growing Up Wild	December 24, 1996	United Kingdom; United States	Produced by the BBC, Lionheart Television, Wildvision Entertainment, Time-Life Video, and Kookanooga Toons; Rerun of 1994 ITC-syndicated series; Broadcast rights shared with sister channel Animal Planet	
The Swamp Critters of Lost Lagoon	July 4, 1997	United States	Created by Bobby Goldsboro for WEDU Tampa	
The Big Garage	September 29, 1997	Canada; United Kingdom	Taped in England; Produced by Prisma Productions of Montreal and Winchester Entertainment of Great Britain; Original November 3, 1995 Canadian premiere on Family Channel	
Bingo & Molly	September 29, 1997	New Zealand; United States	Produced at New Zealand's Avalon Studios for Broadside Entertainment in the U.S.	
Skinnamarink TV	October 1997	Canada; United States	Produced by CBC Canada; Starring Sharon, Lois & Bram	
Salty's Lighthouse	March 30, 1998	United Kingdom; United States	Produced by Sunbow Entertainment; Featuring footage from TUGS; Premiered in syndication in 1997	
The Berenstain Bears	November 2, 1998	Australia; United States	Rerun of 1985 Hanna-Barbera/Southern Star series	
Jay Jay the Jet Plane	November 2, 1998	United States	Produced by PorchLight Entertainment; Created by David Michel; Originally direct-to-video; reruns later surfaced on PBS	
Ni Ni's Treehouse	September 25, 2000	United Kingdom; United States	Developed by Kenn Viselman	
The Magic School Bus	February 24, 2003	Canada; United States	Rerun of Scholastic/Nelvana/PBS series	
Brum	February 24, 2003	United Kingdom	Produced by Ragdoll	
The Save-Ums!	February 24, 2003	Canada; United States	Created by Dan Clark	
Hi-5	February 24, 2003	United States	U.S. remake of original Australian series	
Animal Jam	February 24, 2003	United States	Produced by Jim Henson Television	
Peep and the Big Wide World	April 12, 2004	United States	Produced by WGBH; Based on a 1988 NFB short	
Timothy Goes to School	September 2004	Canada	Produced by Nelvana; Rerun of PBS Kids Bookworm Bunch series; Based on books by Rosemary Wells	
ToddWorld	November 8, 2004	United States	Based on the book series by Todd Parr; Theme song by Smokey Robinson	
Balamory	September 26, 2005 (Discovery Kids); October 3, 2005 (TLC)	United Kingdom	Produced by the BBC	
Hip Hop Harry	September 25, 2006 (Discovery Kids); October 2, 2006 (TLC)	United States	Developed by Claude Brooks	
Bigfoot Presents: Meteor and the Mighty Monster Trucks	September 25, 2006 (Discovery Kids); October 2, 2006 (TLC)	Canada	Produced by CCI Entertainment	
Wilbur	April 16, 2007 (Discovery Kids); April 23, 2007 (TLC)	Canada	Produced by Mercury Filmworks	

== See also ==
- Other preschool-oriented programming banners in the United States:
  - BabyFirst (First Media)
  - Cartoonito (Cartoon Network/Warner Bros. Discovery)
  - Disney Jr. (The Walt Disney Company)
  - Nick Jr. (Paramount Skydance)
  - Smile (Trinity Broadcasting Network)
- List of programs broadcast by TLC
