= Bookmice =

- Created by: Nina Keogh (puppets)
- Written by: Bryan Levy-Young; Lori Fleming; Brian Tremblay
- Directed by: Jeremy Pollock; Clive VanderBurgh
- Starring: Nina Keogh; Trish Leeper; Karen Valleau; Stéphanie Broschart; Eric Fink; Ari Magder; Stefanie Samuels; Jack Duffy; Stephen Brathwaite; Andrew Rosos; Andrew Sardella; Dan Hennessey (voice); Marilyn Boyle; Diane Fabian (animation voice); Erica Luttrell
- Opening theme: "Bookmice" performed by Beauty and the Beat
- Ending theme: "Bookmice" (Instrumental)
- Composer: Pleiades Productions
- Country of origin: Canada
- Original language: English
- No. of seasons: 1
- No. of episodes: 67

Production
- Executive producer: Ruth Vernon
- Producer: Jeremy Pollock
- Production locations: Toronto, Ontario
- Editor: Julian Lannaman
- Camera setup: John Dynes; Kevin Glecoff
- Running time: 30 minutes
- Production company: The Ontario Educational Communications Authority

Original release
- Network: TVOntario
- Release: 28 December 1992 – 30 March 1993

Bookmice is a children's television series about a public library secretly inhabited by three fun-loving mice. It is a spinoff of The Magic Library. It would often also showcase Eastern European cartoons such as Jak Bzuk a Ťuk putovali za sluníčkem and others. The series originally aired on TVOntario in Canada.

== Description ==
Norbert, Zazi and Leon, three fun-loving mice, live secretly behind the walls of the neighbourhood library. Only Lee, a lonely boy who has just moved into the area, and an interloping, decrepit cat know of the existence of the Bookmice. Later in the series, the mice are discovered by three new children, Alysha, Jason, and Luke, who become their secret friends. Humour, wonder, stories, music, and delightful animation are present in the everyday adventures of the mice, as they explore the wondrous world of books – and the library's many friends and activities. Along with encouraging a love of reading, programs that promote social values, as children learn about helping others, the importance of honesty, and overcoming fears.

== Characters ==
- Norbert (voiced by Nina Keogh) — a mouse
- Leon (voiced by Karen Valleau) — a mouse
- Zazi (voiced by Trish Leeper) — a mouse
- Kate (Stéphanie Broschart) — the assistant librarian
- Exit — a ginger cat with green eyes. Seeks to catch the mice. Later named Exit after the first word he could read. (performed by Stephen Brathwaite; voiced by Dan Hennessey)
- The Wizard of Wonder — also known as the "Wiz" of Wonder; later adopts a human secret identity, calling himself "Mr. Flower" after the flower on his coat. (Eric Fink)
- Luke (Andrew Sardella)
- Lee (Andrew Rosos)
- Jason (Ari Magder)
- Alysha (Erica Luttrell)
- Cosmo (Jack Duffy)
- Officer Martinez (Stefanie Samuels)
- The Wicked Witch (Marilyn Boyle)

=== Animation narrator ===
- Diane Fabian

== Episodes ==
No.	Title	Book read	Original release date
1	"Norbert's Dream"	TBA	28 December 1992
After a nasty bump on the head, Norbert realizes his life has been at the whim of a group of writers creating a children's television series. Puppeteers, actors, cameras, wardrobes, props, makeup - what an odd world. This can't be happening. Or can it?
2	"Work and Play"	TBA	29 December 1992
Exit drops in on Leon and Norbert while they are practising their music and says he might be able to get them a real set of drums; he comes through later on but then tries to take control of the band. Norbert is a nuisance when the three mice clean their room together.
3	"The Mess"	TBA	30 December 1992
While tidying and taking inventory in the library, Kate loses some certificates and finds a toy car. Secretly, the mice help Kate find what she's lost.
4	"Call of the Wild"	TBA	31 December 1992
5	"Mysterious Monsters"	TBA	1 January 1993
Norbert overcomes his fear of monsters, and Jason summons up enough courage to speak in public.
6	"Write Right"	TBA	4 January 1993
Alysha finds time to try out for the baseball team only after she talks Norbert into helping her with a book report; he ends up reluctantly writing the whole assignment. Exit continues to try to take control of the band; Norbert continues to resist, but accepts some sheet music the cat offers him.
7	"Someone's Sick"	TBA	5 January 1993
Zazi, Luke, and Mrs. Keaton all have the flu, but when Mr. Flower starts coming down with it too, his tracking systems go haywire and he disappears with every sneeze. Alysha is frightened when he vanishes before her eyes; he confesses to being a wizard in disguise.
8	"The Prankster"	Miss Nelson Is Missing!	6 January 1993
Someone is playing practical jokes in the library, and they are not funny anymore. A search begins to reveal the terrible trickster.
9	"Hide and Seek"	TBA	7 January 1993
10	"Playtime"	TBA	8 January 1993
Zazi, back from drawing lessons, thinks a name change will improve her art. Lee helps the other mice perform a play to convince her to keep her name.
11	"A Friend Like You"	TBA	11 January 1993
Norbert learns that Lee is having trouble fitting in at his new school. He introduces himself and the other mice to the astonished boy.
12	"The Sky Is Falling"	TBA	12 January 1993
During a storm, a large pole falls through the skylight above the mice's room; while the window is being repaired, Zazi and Norbert stay first with Exit and then the Wiz, and learn about sharing with someone they're not used to. Luke makes similar adjustments when his grandfather comes to live with him.
13	"You Can Do It!"	TBA	13 January 1993
Exit tries to prove to his alleycat buddies that he's not a pussycat by accepting a challenge to fight. Leon helps him prepare, but it's brains, not brawn, that eventually win the day. Kate struggles to find a suitable story topic after entering a writing contest.
14	"Growing"	TBA	14 January 1993
Kate and Lee discuss what plants need to grow. Norbert, who wants to grow quickly, overhears, and tries some of their methods — on himself.
15	"Good News, Bad News"	TBA	15 January 1993
Exit and the Mousetones are invited to play at a mouse hop but without Exit. Mrs. Keaton falls off a step stool while she's shelving books, and sprains her ankle.
16	"Shining Through"	TBA	18 January 1993
17	"Sour Notes"	TBA	19 January 1993
While Norbert has enthusiastically worked on his part for band practice, Leon shows up unprepared. Exit comments on the bad notes Leon is playing, and Leon walks out. Meanwhile, Alysha and Luke join Kate in a lip sync contest. Luke meets the mice.
18	"Moving Day"	TBA	20 January 1993
The mice are planning a move to a new home in the cheese factory, until they listen to a story shared by Lee and the library assistant, Kate.
19	"Wishful Thinking"	TBA	21 January 1993
Norbert rubs a lamp he finds in the library, and genie-in-training Fiona Fay appears. She conjures up a pizza for him, but then eats it herself. Meanwhile, Alysha loses all the money she earned in a run to raise money for the local community centre.
20	"The Library Fairy"	TBA	22 January 1993
Fiona Fay is upset about being fired from the Federation of Fairies. The mice try to help her find a new job. Luke tries out for the soccer team and is surprised when he is accepted.
21	"Double Exposure"	TBA	25 January 1993
Zazi's skating banquet and Leon's scout dinner are scheduled on the same night. Zazi is angry because Norbert and Leon promised to attend her function, Leon thinks his event is as important as Zazi's, and Norbert doesn't know what to do. Fiona Fay tries to help but only complicates matters.
22	"Secret Friends"	TBA	26 January 1993
Lee lends the toy car to Norbert, who loses it in the basement. Norbert risks capture by the cat as he searches for the car, which Kate eventually recovers.
23	"Lights! Camera! Exit!"	TBA	27 January 1993
Kate and Mr. Flower plan a celebration for the library's tenth birthday. Because Zazi is away and will miss the big event, Leon decides to videotape the proceedings. Luke discovers that Mr. Flower is really a wizard.
24	"A Genie in the Basement"	TBA	28 January 1993
25	"A Talent for Trouble"	TBA	29 January 1993
Kate is overworked and exhausted. The mice help her by cleaning up the library. After several disagreements, Alysha and Jason finally cooperate in putting on a puppet show ... with two surprise "stars".
26	"Live and Let Live"	TBA	1 February 1993
Exit toughens up after joining The Alleycat Club. Norbert helps The Wiz by babysitting Mother Duck's egg, which nearly becomes breakfast for the cat.
27	"The Wiz of Wonder"	TBA	2 February 1993
Zazi's writing inspiration, the Wizard of Wonder, gets trapped in the computer. Meanwhile, Leon and Norbert try again to get rid of the cat.
28	"Lost and Found"	TBA	3 February 1993
After the Wizard returns to Wonderworld, Leon finds some old toys in the basement. Kate worries about losing her voice, and Lee loses his library card.
29	"Surprises"	TBA	4 February 1993
Norbert thinks that Lee is the only one who has remembered his birthday, but Zazi and Leon are secretly organizing a party. A magic seashell arrives from the Wizard.
30	"Muscle Mouse"	TBA	5 February 1993
While Leon exercises in preparation for a confrontation with the cat, Norbert mopes around because it's too dangerous to leave the library for a game of baseball. Lee, who is collecting old toys for the annual Humane Society sale, comes to Norbert's rescue.
31	"Claws for Alarm"	TBA	8 February 1993
Despite Leon's efforts to secure the library, the cat gets in again and plots his revenge against the mice. Leon and Lee have an argument over Lee's project on cats.
32	"Tall Tails"	TBA	9 February 1993
A new girl named Jenna comes to the library to work on a school project; Lee is initially put off by her boasting, but Zazi, watching from the wall grate, is smitten by Jenna's glamorous clothing and the exciting lifestyle she leads.
33	"On Our Own"	TBA	10 February 1993
Zazi and Leon miss Norbert when he spends a couple of nights away from home for the first time. Kate is worried about Lee when he doesn't drop by the library for a few days.
34	"Friend or Foe"	TBA	11 February 1993
The mice discover the cat in the basement, badly injured in a fight. Zazi insists that they nurse him back to health; Leon and Norbert reluctantly help.
35	"The Hobby"	TBA	12 February 1993
Feeling as if he's the only one without a hobby, Norbert begins looking for something special that he can do. Lee competes with a girl named Alison to make the best model dinosaur, and accidentally lets the library's iguana loose.
36	"The Puppet Makers"	TBA	15 February 1993
While Leon searches for a place in the library to hide some "treasure", he is stalked by the cat. Lee's new interest in puppets gives the mice an idea to frighten the cat.
37	"The Circus"	TBA	16 February 1993
When Norbert and Leon investigate a strange sound coming from the basement, they discover the cat suffering from an annoying affliction. After Kate invites Lee to a performance by the Cirque du Soleil, Norbert begins wondering whether he will ever see a circus.
38	"Time Will Tell"	TBA	17 February 1993
39	"Out of This World"	TBA	18 February 1993
The Wizard of Wonder invites the mice to a party, and unintentionally creates a big problem when he tries to teach Norbert to dance. After a stargazing excursion, Lee and Mrs. Keaton, the librarian, find the Wizard trapped in the library.
40	"Scout's Honor"	TBA	19 February 1993
Lee must design and build a mousetrap to earn his Cub Scout handicraft badge. Leon plans to camp out overnight to get his camping badge and, while reading some survival manuals, makes an interesting discovery.
41	"Truth to Tell"	TBA	22 February 1993
Leon struggles to control his tendency to exaggerate, while Zazi tries to cut down on snacking. Mrs. Keaton the librarian wins an award and gets caught up in the glamour of the presentation ceremony.
42	"C Is for Cat"	TBA	23 February 1993
Norbert becomes the "King of Silverthorn"; Kate is apprehensive about the arrival of an after-school drama teacher; and the cat begins learning the alphabet.
43	"All Together Now"	TBA	24 February 1993
Leon invents a robot to do housework, but Norbert is not pleased when the contraption malfunctions and destroys some of his treasures. The cat continues reading lessons.
44	"Monkeying Around"	TBA	25 February 1993
Norbert is upset to learn that Lee will no longer be coming to the library. He is consoled by Exit, who gives him his special key collection. Two new children, Alysha and Jason, discover the mice.
45	"The Teddy Bear Party"	TBA	26 February 1993
Alysha and Jason meet the mice and promise to keep their secret. Norbert's favorite toy, Freddie the Frog, is repaired and almost given away at The Teddy Bear Party.
46	"Helping Hands"	The Legend of the Indian Paintbrush	1 March 1993
The Wiz of Wonder assumes a second identity as Mr. Flower to get a job in the library and fulfill a special mission. Leon and Norbert start a Handymouse Repair Service for their friends.
47	"Lucky Leon"	TBA	2 March 1993
Leon relies on good luck charms and superstitions to replace Zazi's Walkmouse which he and Norbert have accidentally broken. Alysha, Jason, and Mr. Flower prepare for Friday the 13th.
48	"Dinner Is Served"	The Little Red Hen	3 March 1993
The mice are invited to dine with The Wiz, but unexpectedly travel to Wonderworld, where they meet a couple of pesky bees and a mean witch.
49	"Tricky Business"	TBA	4 March 1993
Norbert tries to help Exit learn the finer point of becoming a household pet. All the mice eventually persuade him to lure Jason's lost dog back to the library.
50	"Winter Woes"	TBA	5 March 1993
While Norbert and Leon excitedly welcome the first winter snowfall, Zazi dreams of becoming a famous figure skater. The Wiz's homemade survival kits come in handy during a severe blizzard.
51	"Ode to Alysha"	TBA	8 March 1993
Norbert becomes smitten with Alysha after she kisses him in gratitude for finding her lost ring. Exit offers worldly advice as Norbert struggles to express his feelings.
52	"Tooth Fairy Troubles"	TBA	9 March 1993
Fiona Fay arrives a night late to collect Norbert's first lost tooth and becomes stranded in the library.
53	"Shamrocks and Shilalees"	TBA	10 March 1993
Seamus McFee, a charming but mischievous leprechaun, takes a liking to the library when he drops in on the mice and friends as they prepare for Irish Week. He decides to make it his permanent home, but he can't stay unless he finds someone to trade places with him. When he tricks Zazi into holding his magic hammer, she disappears into Leprechaun Land, where she is forced to take up cobbling. With the help of the Wiz and Alysha, Norbert and Leon set out to rescue Zazi, but underestimate the powers of the tiny trickster.
54	"Exit to Egypt"	TBA	11 March 1993
The library kicks off its celebration of the cultures of the world with an exhibit on Egypt; Exit, who is being pestered by a neighborhood dog, overhears that in Egypt, cats are treated like kings, and decides to escape to the "land of the pharaohs". Norbert reads Zoom Upstream by Tim Wynne-Jones.
55	"Chocolate Chip Trouble"	TBA	12 March 1993
Leon finds an old electric keyboard that he and Norbert try to fix; Zazi makes chocolate chip cookies for Alysha for her birthday; and Luke, a new boy in the library, thinks he is not invited to Alysha's birthday party. Norbert sneaks one of Zazi's cookies and becomes transparent.
56	"The Story Thief"	TBA	15 March 1993
Someone in Wonderworld is stealing stories and fairy tales. The Wiz and the mice help Cosmo, the head wizard, track the culprit down.
57	"All That Glitters"	TBA	16 March 1993
The mice decide to hold a rummage sale. Norbert discovers a divining rod and proceeds to locate "gold" in the library.
58	"Not Nice"	TBA	17 March 1993
The Witch arrives from Wonderworld and tries to turn the mice into frogs. With a little help from the Wiz, Exit saves the day.
59	"Magic or Not"	TBA	18 March 1993
Fiona Fay comes for a visit, bringing with her a book of spells. Leon finds the book and tries to weave some magic, with dubious results.
60	"The Word Wizard"	TBA	19 March 1993
Norbert can't seem to be able to do anything right; a new "word wizard" program is started at the library to encourage reading - but Alysha's new friends convince her that books are not cool; Mr. Flower and Luke help to gather books for the community centre. Norbert reads Something Special by David McPhail.
61	"Winning Ways"	TBA	22 March 1993
Norbert is very excited that Zazi and Leon are going to see him play in the big baseball game against the Squirrels; the Wiz is studying for his Wizard First Class licence; and an episode of Lardocks and Crunch is featured.
62	"The Dream Team"	TBA	23 March 1993
The library is hosting a big Halloween party — but Alysha feels she's too old to dress up and Norbert refuses to attend when his friend Ramone the pumpkin is inadvertently carved into a jack-o'-lantern. Hoping to change their minds, Fiona Fay and the Wiz team up to cast a spell. The mice read A Dark Dark Tale by Ruth Brown and watch another episode of Lardocks and Crunch.
63	"What a Ball!"	TBA	24 March 1993
The Mousetones receive a rave review after a performance — but Exit's name is left out; Fiona Fay asks Exit and the Mousetones to play at Cinderella's wedding. The Wiz reads from Fish and Flamingo by Nancy White Carlstrom.
64	"It Only Hurts When I Laugh"	TBA	25 March 1993
Leon's big dream of becoming a stand-up comic doesn't pan out exactly as planned when he appears at the Rat's Nest Comedy Club's amateur night; Mrs. Keaton is hurt to learn that she doesn't have a sense of humour. Leon watches another episode of Lardocks and Crunch.
65	"The Sky Travelers"	TBA	26 March 1993
Cosmo decides to step down as Head Wizard of Wonderworld because he believes his imagination is running out; the Wiz is forced to take Cosmo's old job with some disastrous results. Cosmo reads Leo the Late Bloomer by Robert Kraus.
66	"That's Funny"	TBA	29 March 1993
Fiona Fay drops in and tries to plug her new sideline — fun kits; Luke desperately tries to raise money to fix his bike. Norbert watches an episode of Lardocks and Crunch.
67	"Ready to Roll!"	TBA	30 March 1993
The mice hope to be booked on a cross-country tour with their band — but Exit wants no part of the deal. Mr. Flower is asked to speak at a magic convention.

=== Cartoons shown on Bookmice ===
- The Car with the Red Heart (original title: Autícko s cerveným srdcem)
- Cepecek the Water Gnome
- An Apple Goes a Rolling (original title: Koulelo se jablíčko)
- Bzuk and Tuk (original title: Jak Bzuk a Ťuk putovali za sluníčkem)
- Kaspar and the Kangaroo

== Broadcast ==
Bookmice originally aired in Canada on TVOntario, and was sold for United States broadcast to the TLC network in October 1992 along with fellow production Join In!. Both became the first two series to air on TLC's preschool block, Ready Set Learn!, on 28 December.
