= Bingo & Molly =

1997 American-New Zealand children's television series

- Genre: Children's
- Created by: Alice G. Donenfeld; Robin Goodrow
- Starring: Brian Narelle; Robin Goodrow
- Music by: Robin Goodrow; Ric Zivic
- Countries of origin: New Zealand; United States
- Original language: English
- No. of seasons: 1
- No. of episodes: 26

Production
- Executive producer: Alice G. Donenfeld
- Producer: Tom Broadbridge
- Production locations: Avalon Studios, Lower Hutt, Wellington
- Running time: 30 minutes
- Production companies: New Zealand: Avalon Studios; United States: Broadside Entertainment; Alice Entertainment
- Budget: NZ$2.5 million (entire series)

Original release
- Network: TLC
- Release: September 29, 1997 – 1997

Bingo & Molly is a 1997 American-New Zealand live-action children's television series, made with puppets and taped at New Zealand's Avalon Studios. Its title characters, a brother-and-sister rabbit duo (performed by U.S. puppeteers Brian Narelle and Robin Goodrow), learn valuable lessons and social skills in each episode. Goodrow, an alumnus of San Francisco's KRON-TV, served as co-developer, story editor, and songwriter, as well as a set designer; production at Avalon lasted eight weeks during March–May 1997.

The series ran for a single season of 26 episodes in its native countries, and was part of the Ready Set Learn! block on U.S. cable channel TLC. A winner of the Parents' Choice Awards (through its tie-in soundtrack) and CINE's Golden Eagles, it was positively received during its original broadcast, and also in its 1999 home video release by Anchor Bay Entertainment. In 2022, Chicago's Questar picked up the title for a streaming re-release.

== Synopsis ==
"The odd couple of the rabbit world. He is the wise one; she is always getting into trouble."

— The Chicago Tribune's description of the title duo

Bingo and Molly, a brother-and-sister rabbit duo residing in the woodlands, learn valuable lessons and social skills. Recurring characters in their adventures include Duck, a duck who wears a rabbit suit, Gladys the Goose, Rosa the Bear, Mr. Gruff the dog, and Zigger the Mole; the rabbits' parents are not seen or mentioned. A fox named Mr. Growl tells stories relating to the rabbits' lessons, while carrots and sunflowers provide some musical numbers.

== Cast ==
- Brian Narelle as Bingo and Mr. Growl
- Robin Goodrow as Molly
- Larissa Matheson

== Episodes ==
1. The Smiling Staircase
2. Gladys' Birthday
3. Promise the Sky
4. The Hot Potato
5. In the Soup
6. Bubbleland
7. Zigger's First Day
8. The Wish
9. The Birthday Present
10. Mr. Growl's Brothers
11. Hide and Peek
12. The Treasure
13. Ranger Big Bunny
14. The Messy Room
15. The Egg
16. We Can Work It Out
17. Your Grass Is Greener
18. Fun Either Way
19. The More the Merrier
20. Pink and Blue
21. Rainy Day Blues
22. Yes You Can
23. A Turn for the Better
24. Yours, Mine, and Oops
25. All Together Now
26. The Daisy and the Rose

== Production ==
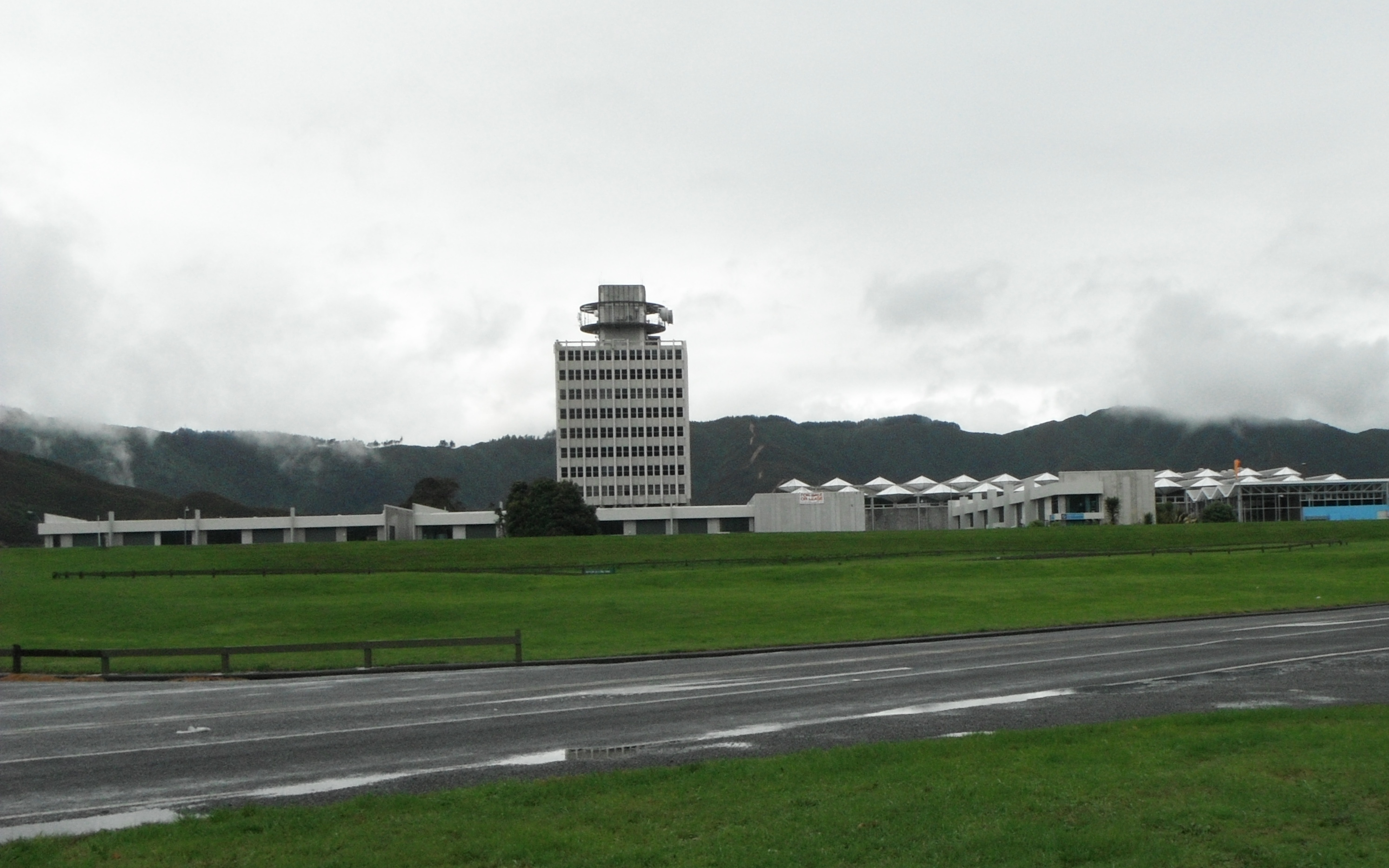
Bingo & Molly was made at New Zealand's Avalon Studios (pictured in 2013) over an eight-week period in early 1997.

Bingo & Molly was produced by Alice Entertainment of Los Angeles, Avalon Studios in the outskirts of Wellington, New Zealand, and the U.S. Broadside Entertainment. It was created by Alice G. Donenfeld (the namesake behind Alice Entertainment) and KRON-TV alumnus Robin Goodrow (who had previously starred in the San Francisco station's 1980s series Buster and Me).

In 1996, after Goodrow had unsuccessfully shopped syndication rights for Buster and Me to various Los Angeles firms, Donenfeld's company approached her to co-develop a children's program for the TLC cable channel. During that time, Alice set up a deal where TLC and Avalon would each provide half the funding for what became Bingo & Molly.

At the start of the series' production, Goodrow wrote 20 storylines and several of the songs, and also served as script editor, creative/puppet director, and (along with Catriona Campbell at Avalon) one of the set designers. The "distinctive, squeaky voice" she used for Molly—"a wide-eyed, naive young bunny"—was the same as her Buster ape character, Vanilla. After she hired Australian and British personnel for the puppetry, her comrade Brian Narelle became the U.S. puppeteer sought in Avalon's deal. The title characters were designed by Wētā Workshop's Richard Taylor.

Avalon spent eight weeks taping the show during March–May 1997. By the time Goodrow arrived in New Zealand in the latter month, the crew underwent a "brutal" schedule where 24 episodes were made in 26 days, with little time for sleep. Scenes could only be made in two takes most of the time, and the dialogue was recorded live on set. As she told The Press Democrat of Santa Rosa, California, "[Our studio] was booked for June, so our window kept getting smaller each day." As with the Muppeteers, Goodrow and her fellow actors operated their characters from below the stage, guided by video-monitor references. In 2018, she would recount her on-set experiences in "You Should Know Me", an autobiographical essay for Chicken Soup for the Soul.

On the U.S. side of production, Michael Sporn's studio provided animated segments for each episode.

== Music ==
You Can Do It!

Soundtrack album by Bingo & Molly Cast
- Released: 5 March 1998
- Genre: Children's
- Length: 50:56
- Label: Music for Little People
- Producers: Ric Zivic; Teddy Wender

Along with Goodrow, Ric Zivic provided music for Bingo and Molly. In March 1998, the show's cast received a soundtrack album, You Can Do It!, on the Music for Little People label.

Track listing
No.	Title	Writer(s)	Length
1.	"Bingo & Molly Theme"	Dana Thomas; Teddy Werner; Ric Zivic	1:21
2.	"Treasures"	Robin Goodrow; Thomas; Wender; Zivic	3:32
3.	"Boss"	Thomas; Werner; Zivic	2:42
4.	"If You Really Are My Friend"	Thomas; Werner; Zivic	3:04
5.	"Duck Smelled Funny"	Thomas; Werner; Zivic	1:56
6.	"It's Time to Take a Bath"	Thomas; Werner; Zivic	3:14
7.	"When Someone Says No"	Thomas; Werner; Zivic	3:21
8.	"Molly Can't Take It"	Thomas; Werner; Zivic	2:49
9.	"The Mess"		3:21
10.	"Don't You Feel Better Now"	Thomas; Werner; Zivic	3:33
11.	"Poor Rosa"	Thomas; Werner; Zivic	2:39
12.	"I Got What I Got"	Thomas; Werner; Zivic	3:12
13.	"No One Is Perfect"	Thomas; Werner; Zivic	3:54
14.	"Teamwork"	Thomas; Werner; Zivic	3:01
15.	"Take the Time"	Goodrow; Thomas; Werner; Zivic	3:03
16.	"You Can Do It If You Try"	Thomas; Werner; Zivic	3:49
17.	"Bingo & Molly Theme (Reprise)"	Thomas; Werner; Zivic	2:25
Total length:			50:56

== Broadcast and home entertainment ==
Bingo & Molly premiered on TLC's Ready Set Learn! block in the United States on 29 September 1997, and also aired in New Zealand (where it was co-produced) as well as in Canada. Thanks to its popularity and high ratings in its 6:30 a.m. time slot, TLC gave the show a Christmas Day marathon three months later. It was rerun on both that channel and sister station Discovery Kids until 2002. Several episodes were released on videotape by Anchor Bay Entertainment in 1999; in 2022, the series was re-released on Sling TV by FamilyTime, an imprint of Chicago's Questar.

== Reception ==
During its original run, the series won a CINE Golden Eagle for Excellence in Broadcasting. Bill Mann of The Press Democrat called it "a sweet-natured show" and took note of Goodrow's "brightly colored sets". In a 1999 video review for the Hartford Courant, Gretchen-Marie Goose stated, "This is no Sesame Street, but young children will find it entertaining and educational." A two-episode collection, "Hide & Peek", received an "A" grade from Parenting magazine.

Tie-in album You Can Do It! was also praised, receiving a Parents' Choice Award. The Chicago Tribune's Nancy Maes wrote that its "cute songs about good values are a musical version of Miss Manners for moppets." Allmusic's Stephen Thomas Erlewine gave it four stars out of five; he noted that despite the source material's preschool demographic, "the record is entertaining to older children and possibly even adults because it has a good sense of humour and is quite cute.... Zivic's songs are [also] catchy and clever".
