= Ni Ni's Treehouse =

- Countries of origin: United Kingdom; United States
- Original language: English
- No. of seasons: 4
- No. of episodes: 65

Production
- Executive producer: Kenn Viselman
- Production companies: The Itsy Bitsy Entertainment Company and GMTV

Original release
- Network: TLC
- Release: September 25, 2000 – February 21, 2003

Ni Ni's Treehouse is an animated preschool television series and was produced jointly by The Itsy Bitsy Entertainment Company and GMTV. It was originally aired on TLC and GMTV from 2000 until 2003.

== About the show ==
Ni Ni works in a treehouse on an Oooberry tree in an Oooberry forest in Oooberryland.

=== Characters ===
- Ni Ni – A yellow dog with an active imagination.
- Treezles – Two green squirrels whose names are Bee with a red nose and Dee with a pink nose.
- Norman and the Fingerlings – Norman is a yellow character with colored shapes and multicolored hair and the Fingerlings (Fip, Fap and Feppy) are small red characters with fingers for arms. Fip is the only girl and the eldest one, Fap has yellow sunglasses and is the middle one, and Feppy is the youngest one.
- Oupagogo – A green creature with yellow spots and blue hair with a simple vocabulary who lives in a yellow house.
- Horace the Hippo – A pink hippo who lives in a cottage in a jungle with his friends like Ant, Henry the Elephant, Marmoset, Owl and Wendy the Rhino.
- The Drawing Children – Some human children who are great at drawing pictures which are turned into a story told by a child.
- The Stringy Things – A blue string named Big String and a yellow string named Little String who can turn into anything they want.

=== Cast ===
- Lewis Rae – Ni Ni – costume
  - Jennifer Thompson Taylor – Ni Ni – voice
- Gillie Robic – Treezle Bee – voice
- Debby Cumming – Treezle Dee – voice
- Mark Todd – Norman – voice
- Susanna Howard – Fip the Fingerling – voice
- Kevin Griffiths – Fap the Fingerling – voice
- Steve Tiplady – Feppy the Fingerling – voice
- Megg Nicol – Oupagogo – voice

=== Segments ===
- Norman and the Fingerlings
- Oupagogo
- Horace the Hippo
- The Drawing Children
- The Stringy Things

=== Animations ===
- Horace & Oupagogo & Stringy Things - Ealing Animation (El Nombre)
- Children's Stories (The Drawing Children) - Flicks Films (Mr. Men, Junglies and Bananaman)

== Episodes ==
=== Season 1 (2000) ===
- Silly Shapes (9/25/2000)
- Spring Clean (9/26/2000)
- Sleepy Heads! (9/27/2000)
- Sing-a-long (9/28/2000)
- Save It! (9/29/2000)
- Forget-Me-Not (10/2/2000)
- Sorry! (10/9/2000)
- Let's Pretend (10/16/2000)
- Feeling Fine! (10/23/2000)
- How Many? (10/30/2000)
- So Special (TBA)

=== Season 2 (2001) ===
- Guess What (1/1/2001)
- Cover Up! (1/8/2001)
- A Perfect Fit (1/15/2001)
- Keep Fit (1/22/2001)
- Faster Faster (1/29/2001)
- Let's Play (2/5/2001)
- Drink Up (2/12/2001)
- Special Things (2/19/2001)
- Smile (2/26/2001)
- It's Mine! (3/5/2001)
- Big Friends (3/12/2001)
- What's Wrong? (3/19/2001)
- Look Here (3/26/2001)
- Rise and Shine (4/2/2001)
- Wrap Up (4/9/2001)
- Wakey Wakey (4/16/2001)
- Surprise Surprise (4/23/2001)
- Giddyup (4/30/2001)
- Boo! (5/7/2001)
- Over Here! (5/14/2001)

=== Season 3 (2002) ===
- Peek-a-Boo! (5/6/2002)
- Clean It Up! (5/13/2002)
- Found It! (5/20/2002)
- Pretty Pictures! (5/27/2002)
- Moo! Moo! (6/3/2002)
- Yummy! (6/10/2002)
- Up and Away! (6/17/2002)
- I've Won (6/24/2002)
- Stay Cool! (7/1/2002)
- I'm the Best (7/8/2002)
- Bump! (7/15/2002)
- Pretty Please (7/22/2002)
- Tasty (7/29/2002)
- Coochi Coo! (8/5/2002)
- Brrr! (8/12/2002)
- Roar! (8/19/2002)
- Oh Dear! (8/26/2002)
- Be Brave! (9/2/2002)
- Bright Ideas (9/9/2002)
- Snap (9/16/2002)

=== Season 4 (2003) ===
- Tap! Tap! Tap! (1/6/2003)
- Please Wait! (1/7/2003)
- Aaachoo (1/8/2003)
- Here We Go (1/9/2003)
- Let's Explore (1/10/2003)
- Big Surprise (1/13/2003)
- One! Two! Three! (1/20/2003)
- Crash Bang (1/27/2003)
- Me Me Me (2/3/2003)
- It's Freezing (2/10/2003)
- Birdie Birdie (2/17/2003)
- Grow! (2/18/2003)
- Who's Who (2/19/2003)
- Super Duper (2/20/2003)
- Wing-a-Long (2/21/2003)

== Broadcast ==
In the United States, Ni Ni's Treehouse premiered on September 25, 2000 on TLC's Ready Set Learn! block, and later appeared on Discovery Kids (as part of Ready Set Learn!) and Spanish-speaking Telemundo. Internationally, it aired on GMTV Kids and later CITV Channel in the UK in 2006.

== Direct-to-video ==
- The Oooberry Alphabet Zoo!

As it is raining in Oooberryland and they cannot go to the zoo, Nini and the Treezle Twins learn their alphabet while drawing the animals for their own personal Oooberry zoo.

- Keep On Counting!

After having a look at some of his castle drawings, Nini makes a castle for Princesses Bee and Dee as they learn their numbers from 1 to 10.

- Nursery Rhyme Time!

Nini sketches most of the 14 nursery rhymes covered, allocating a special book for each.

- Nini's Coloring Circus!

The Treezles are upset because they've missed the bus to the circus, but Nini saves the day by drawing them their own personal circus involving many colors and shapes.

- Nini's Birthday Surprise!

It's party time in Oooberryland! Bee and Dee, the Treezle Twins, are celebrating their birthday and Norman and the Fingerlings are having trouble with Fap's surprise gift.
