= WCNY-FM =

Classical music public radio station in Syracuse, New York, United States

- Syracuse, New York; United States
- Frequency: 91.3 MHz (HD Radio)
- Branding: Classic FM

Programming
- Format: Classical music
- Subchannels: HD2: "Pulso Central" (Spanish-language programming); HD3: "Community FM" and Jazz

Ownership
- Owner: The Public Broadcasting Council of Central New York, Inc.
- Sister stations: WCNY-TV

History
- First air date: December 4, 1971
- Call sign meaning: Central New York

Technical information
- Facility ID: 66284
- Class: B
- ERP: 8,300 watts
- HAAT: 334 meters (1,096 ft)
- Transmitter coordinates: 42.944944°N 76.118389°W

Links
- Webcast: Listen live; HD2: Listen live; HD3: Listen live
- Website: www.wcny.org/radio/

WCNY-FM (91.3 MHz) is a public radio station in Syracuse, New York, that plays classical music and is an NPR member station. The station is owned and operated by The Public Broadcasting Council of Central New York, Inc. and shares studios with WCNY-TV at the WCNY Broadcast and Education Center on West Fayette Street in Syracuse's Near Westside neighborhood. The station broadcasts Spanish-language programming as "Pulso Central" on its second HD Radio subchannel and community affairs programming as "Community FM" on a third channel. Jazz music may be heard on the third HD channel during times when talk shows are not broadcast.

The Bluegrass Ramble started on WCNY-FM in 1973 and continues each Sunday night at 9:00 PM.The show is hosted by Bill Knowlton who was named Broadcast Personality of the Year by the International Bluegrass Music Association in 1997.

== Stations ==
The programming is broadcast on three stations:

Call sign	Frequency	Location	ERP	HAAT	Class	Facility ID	Coordinates
WCNY-FM	91.3 FM	Syracuse, New York	8,300 watts	334 meters (1,096 ft)	B	66284	42.944944°N 76.118389°W
WJNY	90.9 FM	Watertown, New York	7,100 watts	137 meters (449 ft)	C3	53729	43.862278°N 75.727389°W
WUNY	89.5 FM	Utica, New York	6,300 watts	237 meters (778 ft)	B	53735	43.143944°N 75.177361°W
