= WCNY-TV =

Television station in Syracuse, New York

- Syracuse, New York; United States
- Channels: Digital: 20 (UHF); Virtual: 24
- Branding: WCNY Connected

Programming
- Affiliations: 24.1: PBS; for others, see § Subchannels

Ownership
- Owner: The Public Broadcasting Council of Central New York, Inc.
- Sister stations: WCNY-FM

History
- Founded: March 15, 1965
- First air date: December 20, 1965
- Former call signs: WHTV (CP, 1952–1965)
- Former channel numbers: Analog: 24 (UHF, 1965–2009); Digital: 25 (UHF, 2002–July 2019)
- Former affiliations: NET (1965–1970)
- Call sign meaning: Central New York

Technical information
- Licensing authority: FCC
- Facility ID: 53734
- ERP: 62 kW
- HAAT: 409.7 m (1,344 ft)
- Transmitter coordinates: 42°56′41.8″N 76°7′6.2″W
- Translator(s): W22DO-D Utica

Links
- Public license information: Public file; LMS
- Website: www.wcny.org

WCNY-TV (channel 24) is a PBS member television station in Syracuse, New York, United States. Owned by The Public Broadcasting Council of Central New York, Inc., it is sister to classical music radio station WCNY-FM (91.3). The two stations share studios at the WCNY Broadcast and Education Center on West Fayette Street in Syracuse's Near Westside neighborhood and transmitter facilities in Pompey, New York.

WCNY is also seen on translator W22DO-D (channel 22), covering the Mohawk Valley (including Utica and Rome) from a transmitter on Smith Hill Road in Deerfield.

== History ==
WCNY-TV used a logo patterned after the sugar maple tree, the state tree of New York, from 1965 to 2001; the autumnal color version seen here debuted in 1971, when the station began broadcasting in color. Originally, the tree was a stylized version of a hollyhock found on a Japanese family's crest.

WCNY was established in March 1965 by the Onondaga County School Board Association under a charter by the New York State Education Department. A non-profit organization, initially known as The Educational Television Council of Central New York, Inc., was set up to manage the station. The station was originally assigned the call letters WHTV, but switched to WCNY-TV on September 23, 1965, after the station now known as WWNY-TV in Watertown gave up the call letters. It went on the air December 20, 1965.

The new station's equipment was donated by General Electric, whose plant in the nearby town of Salina manufactured broadcast equipment. General Electric also provided WCNY with its studios, located on Old Liverpool Road in the eastern end of Salina. (WCNY's entire TV and radio operations would be based there until 2013, when it moved to its current location.) WCNY initially broadcast in monochrome, using cameras used to tape The Beatles' first appearance on The Ed Sullivan Show, but switched to color in 1971.

WCNY was initially a member station of National Educational Television (NET). When NET was replaced by the Public Broadcasting Service in 1970, WCNY became a member station of PBS. Over the years, WCNY has been responsible for producing programs and specials of local interest, some of which were distributed nationally by PBS and/or other outlets. Among the programs produced by WCNY and seen nationally include Old Enough To Care, a six-part drama that was picked up by PBS and distributed to their member stations in 1982, and Pappyland, a children's television program co-produced with Craftsmen and Scribes' Creative Workshop and telecast for three years on TLC's Ready Set Learn! block, in addition to various PBS member stations.

In 2007, the station discontinued its pledge drive, making it the only PBS member station to do so. According to WCNY's president and CEO, the station is "focused on truly eliminating our dependence on any state and federal funding".

== Technical information ==
=== Subchannels ===
The station's signal is multiplexed:

Subchannels of WCNY-TV
Subchannel	Res.	Short name	Programming
24.1	1080i	WCNY-1	PBS
24.2	480i	WCNY-2	Create
24.3	480i	WCNY-3	World Channel
24.4	480i	WCNY-4	PBS Kids

WCNY-TV became the first television station in the Syracuse market to produce and broadcast its own programs in high definition in 2006.

WCNY-TV operates four digital programming subchannels, which also simulcast on W22DO-D.

=== Analog-to-digital conversion ===
WCNY-TV shut down its analog signal, over UHF channel 24, on June 12, 2009, the official date on which full-power television stations in the United States transitioned from analog to digital broadcasts under federal mandate. The station's digital signal remained on its pre-transition UHF channel 25, using virtual channel 24.

Prior to March 2013, WCNY-TV's main programming was broadcast in SD-only (480i) on subchannel 24.1, while continuous HD (1080i) programming was offered on subchannel 24.4. Create had also been cable-only until that month's channel map reorganization.

A repeater on UHF analog channel 62 had transmitted from Nedrow to reach over-the-air viewers south of Syracuse in higher elevations until the 2009 digital conversion.

=== Translator ===
City of license	Callsign	Channel	ERP	HAAT	Facility ID	Transmitter coordinates
Utica	W22DO-D	22	1.55 kW	227 m (745 ft)	167539	43°08′38″N 75°10′39″W
