= Gene Taylor (TV and radio personality) =

- Born: Eugene Lee Herships; June 26, 1947; Detroit, Michigan, U.S.
- Died: January 6, 2001 (aged 53)
- Resting place: Franklin, Michigan
- Education: Frank Cody High School
- Occupations: TV and radio host, writer, comedian
- Years active: 1969–2001

Gene Taylor (born Eugene Lee Herships; June 26, 1947 – January 6, 2001) was an American comedian, TV and radio host and writer, best known for his on-air work in Toronto and Detroit.

== Early career ==
Taylor was born in Detroit, where he attended Frank Cody High School. He became a stand-up comedian after high school, working nightclubs at age 20. He briefly joined the army and then returned to comedy, working primarily in strip clubs starting in 1969, including the Victory Burlesque theatre in Toronto. He also wrote jokes for Bob Hope and other comedians. In 1971 he auditioned for the Detroit Playboy Club and spent the next two years working the Playboy circuit across the U.S.

== Toronto TV host ==
In September 1973, Taylor—who had married a woman from Toronto the previous year—joined Toronto TV station CITY-TV, giving away prizes during the station's afternoon movie on a program called Prizewinner's Playhouse. Taylor said CITY initially paid him $14,300 and a car. One of his popular early characters was Victor Voice, a newscaster parody. The afternoon show evolved into an interview and comedy show called Speak Easy, which ran weekdays at 1 pm with Taylor as host. He also hosted a series of Saturday monster movies on CITY called Monsters We Know And Love. In September 1974, he became the first host of CITY's Boogie dance program, before turning the reins over to Paul Godfrey. In 1975, Taylor was the host of a comedy club in the Drawing Room at Friar's Tavern in Toronto.

Taylor created the satirical Idi Amin Fan Club in July 1975, which generated negative publicity in Canada and internationally. A Toronto Star editorial called it "the most tasteless caper of the month." While continuing to host Speak Easy, Taylor also briefly worked as a weatherman at CITY in September 1975. Early the next year, while still working with CITY, he hosted Bingo on Global on the Global Television Network, calling bingo numbers on a show that ran every weekday at 3:30 with a weekend edition on Saturdays at 7:30.

In September 1976, Taylor started a new show on CITY, Bazaar, which ran 90 minutes every weekday at noon. He wrestled Sweet Daddy Siki in an appearance on the CBLT special The Cocktail Zone in April 1977. Three months later, and only 10 months after starting Bazaar, Taylor announced that he would be leaving CITY to join CBLT, a rival Toronto station. The Gene Taylor Show, a 30-minute talk and variety show, also featuring the Russ Little band, premiered on October 3, 1977 and aired Monday, Wednesday and Friday at 7:30 pm. The show got off to a slow start, but by February 1978 was averaging 60-75,000 viewers a night. In an interview that year, Taylor said he expected to earn a six-figure annual income for the first time in his career.

Buffalo, New York and its TV personalities were frequent targets of Taylor's humour. He made a bet with Buffalo weatherman Barry Lillis over a Toronto Maple Leafs vs Buffalo Sabres game where the person from the losing team's city would have to wear the other team's jersey on-air for a week. After losing the bet, Lillis wore a Leafs sweater for a week in April 1978. Taylor started a second show on CBLT, Trivia, in September 1978, but during the same season, The Gene Taylor Show was cut from three days a week to two. It was cancelled after its second season and Taylor left CBLT, although he had already taped episodes for the 1979-80 season of Trivia before he left.

== Return to Detroit ==
Taylor then returned to Detroit, initially hosting a five-day-a-week afternoon talk show on WDIV-TV starting on October 22, 1979. He would continue to make regular appearances in Toronto for years, most notably as a charity telethon host. In Peterborough, Ontario in February 1980, Taylor presented Canadian Prime Minister Joe Clark a note signed by 25,000 residents of Detroit expressing gratitude for Canada's help in freeing American diplomats trapped in Iran. Taylor also had a regular trivia segment on Don Daynard's morning show on Toronto radio station CKFM-FM starting in 1981. After Daynard jumped to CHFI-FM in 1987, "Taylor's Trivia" became a regular feature of Daynard's show there until Daynard retired in December 1999.

In Detroit, Taylor began working with radio host and Buffalo native Dick Purtan in 1983, and the two would work together for the next 17 years. Taylor became a writer, executive producer and on-air voice talent for Purtan's show. Taylor and Purtan also became prominent supporters of The Salvation Army in Detroit, creating the annual Bed and Bread radiothon fundraiser.

Taylor was still working with Purtan when he died at age 53 after a massive asthma attack in January 2001. His funeral was held in Franklin, Michigan. Taylor had been working on a book about Michigan at the time of his death. It was completed by Colleen Burcar, his colleague on the Purtan show, and published as Michigan Curiosities: Quirky Characters, Roadside Oddities & Other Offbeat Stuff in 2003.

== Personal ==
Taylor was married twice, first to Mardi, whom he met in 1969 and married in 1972. They had two sons together, Kelly (born in 1978) and Christian (1984). He later married Helen Pasakarnis, and the two were together when Taylor died.
