= Iris, The Happy Professor =

- Also known as: Professor Iris
- Genre: Children's show
- Created by: Henri Desclez
- Developed by: Henri Desclez; Norma Denys
- Written by: Henri Desclez
- Directed by: Chuck Rubin; François Jobin; Pierre R. Thériault
- Creative director: Henri Desclez
- Starring: Pier Paquette; Frank Meschkuleit; Tim Gosley; Rob Mills; Michel Lapointe; Jani Lauzon
- Theme music composer: Stéphane Deschamps
- Composers: Stéphane Deschamps; Benoit Roberge (1993); Joël Champagne (1993)
- Country of origin: Canada
- Original languages: English; French
- No. of seasons: 6
- No. of episodes: 156

Production
- Executive producer: Henri Desclez
- Producers: Henri Desclez; Norma Denys
- Production locations: Montreal, Quebec; Barcelona, Catalonia
- Cinematography: Sébastien Tremblay
- Camera setup: Multi-Camera
- Running time: 14 minutes
- Production companies: Desclez Productions; D'Ocon Films Productions

Original release
- Network: The Learning Channel; Radio-Canada; Canal J
- Release: 1992 – 1994

Iris, The Happy Professor (also known as Iris and Professor Iris and in French as Iris, le gentil professeur or Professeur Iris) is a Canadian—produced children's television show created by former Belgian-born comic book artist Henri Desclez, that aired from 1992 to 1994. It revolves around Professor Iris, a purple ibis who teaches a class of three students: Piano, Skeleton, and Plant. The Professor teaches a variety of subjects to his students and always wears a bowtie based on the topic of the lesson in each episode. 156 episodes were produced over six seasons.

== French-language dub ==
A French-language version was made by Montreal's Cinélume Film et Vidéo. This version was made under the supervision of Vincent Davy for the first two seasons (uncredited on the first and credited on the second), and then of Christine Boivineau for the remaining episodes; Joey Galimi adapted the songs of the series to French.

== Characters ==
- Professor Iris: voiced by Pier Paquette (English); Pierre Auger (French) – A purple ibis and teacher at the unnamed school that serves as the series' setting. He is knowledgeable, optimistic, and the series' protagonist.
- Skeleton: voiced by Frank Meschkuleit, Rob Mills (English); Jean Galtier (French) – A skeleton of an ibis with bones laid over a red cardigan.
- Piano: voiced by Tim Gosley (English); Élise Bertrand (French) – A pink piano who loves music.
- Plant: voiced by Tim Gosley (English); Gilbert Lachance (French) – A whimsical flower in a flowerpot.
- Ms. Principal: voiced by Frank Meschkuleit, Rob Mills (English); Daniel Picard (French) – A yellow duck who is headmistress of the school. She often walks into the class to complain about the racket when it gets noisy.
- Mr. Plumeau: voiced by Michel Lapointe (English); Edgar Fruitier (French) – A grey dog who serves as the school's janitor.
- Kiwi: voiced by Jani Lauzon (English); Lisette Dufour (French) – A green frog who is Ms. Principal's niece.

== International broadcasting ==
Aside from airing in its native Canada, Iris, The Happy Professor was one of the first six shows featured on TLC's Ready Set Learn! block during its 28 December 1992 debut. In Latin America, the series aired on Discovery Kids from the channel's launch on November 1, 1996 until the series got taken off the channel's schedule in 2000. It has also aired in several countries and territories including France, Israel, Hong Kong, Taiwan, the United Kingdom, Malaysia, Philippines, Singapore, Spain, Scotland, Brunei and Jordan.
