= List of programs broadcast by TVO =

This is a list of programs broadcast by TVO, an English-language provincial educational television station, operated by the Ontario Educational Communications Authority, a crown corporation owned by the Government of Ontario.

== Current programming ==
=== Children's programming ===
This is the programming for TVOKids:

==== Current programming ====
===== Original/commissioned programming =====
- 16 Hudson (August 21, 2018 – present)
- Abby Hatcher (February 11, 2019 – present)
- Ainara's Bookshelf (February 2, 2023 – present)
- All-Round Champion (March 25, 2020 – present)
- Audrey's Shelter (June 17, 2024 – present)
- Baby Baby (2021–present)
- Backyard Beats (2020–present)
- Big Top Academy (2018–present)
- Blynk and Aazoo (2019–present)
- Burps, Butts and Bones (2025–present)
- Canada Crew (2017–present)
- The Coco Boo (2024 – present)
- Cutie Pugs (December 10, 2018 – present)
- Dino Dex (2024–present)
- Dino Dana (May 24, 2017–present)
- Dream It To Be It (September 5, 2023 – present)
- Gabby's Farm (2021–present)
- Galapagos X (November 25, 2023 – present)
- Green Squad (September 12, 2023 – present)
- How Do You Feel? (November 16, 2020 – present)
- How To Do Stuff Good (2021–present)
- Interstellar Ella (April 17, 2023 – present)
- It's My Party! (2018–present)
- Leo's Fishheads (March 19, 2020 – present)
- Leo's Pollinators (April 22, 2022 – present)
- Look Kool (2015–2020; 2024–present)
- Makeaway Takeaway (2025–present)
- Mia & Codie (March 12, 2024 – present)
- Momolu and Friends (September 5, 2022 – present)
- My Home, My Life (2020–present)
- Now You Know (2015–present)
- Odd Squad (November 26, 2014 – present)
- Odd Squad Mobile Unit (February 25, 2020 – present)
- Odd Squad UK (2024 – present)
- Old Enough! (2024 – present)
- The Ollie & Moon Show (2017–present)
- Opie's Home (2017–present)
- Paw Patrol (August 27, 2013 – present)
- Project Rube (2024 – present)
- Pup Academy (August 26, 2019 – present)
- Raven's Quest (January 22, 2018 – present)
- Riley Rocket (October 21, 2023 – present)
- Science Max: Experiments at Large (2015–present)
- Secrets of the Forest (2024–present)
- Step By Step Let's Dance (September 7, 2021 – present)
- Sunny's Quest (September 13, 2022 – present)
- Super Mighty Makers (2018–present)
- Tiny and Tall (October 7, 2023 – present)
- Trading Skills (2024 – present)
- The Wacky Word Show (September 30, 2019 – present)
- When I Grow Up! (June 28, 2018 – present)
- Wild Kratts (January 11, 2011 – present)
- Wolf Joe (January 10, 2021 – present)
- Woolly Woolly (2025–present)
- Wordsville (2024–present)

===== Acquired programming =====
- Arthur (January 6, 1997 – present)
- Big Words, Small Stories (June 7, 2021 – present)
- Book Hungry Bears (2020–present)
- BooSnoo! (2024 – present)
- B.O.T. and the Beasties (August 7, 2023 – present)
- The Brilliant World of Tom Gates (September 9, 2021 – present)
- Carl the Collector (2025–present)
- Clifford the Big Red Dog (January 9, 2023 – present)
- Colourblocks (April 17, 2023 – present)
- Donkey Hodie (2021–present)
- The Game Catchers (January 22, 2024 – present)
- Go Green with the Grimwades (August 3, 2022 – present)
- Hardball (2019–present)
- Hero Elementary (September 9, 2020 – present)
- Jasmine & Jambo (July 3, 2023 – present)
- JoJo & Gran Gran (2021–present)
- Kangaroo Beach (June 5, 2023 – present)
- Kid-E-Cats (June 5, 2023 – present)
- Let's Go For a Walk (2021–present)
- Let's Go Luna! (May 4, 2019 – present)
- Messy Goes to OKIDO (June 5, 2023 – present)
- MixMups (2024–present)
- Mojo Swoptops (2025–present)
- Molly of Denali (July 9, 2023 – present)
- Number 1 Newton Avenue (2022–present)
- Numberblocks (February 5, 2019 – present)
- Odo (January 10, 2022 – present)
- Olga da Polga (2025–present)
- Pip and Posy (2022–present)
- Rosie's Rules (October 11, 2022 – present)
- The Singalings (2024 – present)
- Vegesaurs (July 4, 2023 – present)
- Work It Out Wombats! (February 5, 2024 – present)
- Xavier Riddle and the Secret Museum (December 10, 2019 – present)
- Yakka Dee! (2020–present)

===== Interstitial series =====
Some of the interstitial series on TVOKids are produced in-house by TVOntario, and are based on Ontario's educational curriculum. Each program is approximately 1-4 minutes per episode.

Original/commissioned

- ABC Singsong (2019–present)
- ABC with Kenny G (2021–present)
- Bamboo Loves Music (2022–present)
- Bamboo Loves Parasports (2024–present)
- Bookaneers (2017–present)
- Curious Crafting (2022–present)
- Cutie Pugs ABC
- Dr. Cheddar (2020–present)
- Five Ingredient Challenge (2022–present)
- Garbology (2025–present)
- Happy Place (2025–present)
- Hungry Brain (January 10, 2023 – present)
- I Love My Job (2025–present)
- Jolly Reader
- Let's Find Out (2016–2022; 2024–present)
- MathXplosion (2016–2021; 2024–present)
- Mia & Codie (March 12, 2024 - present)
- My Canada (2025–present)
- Odd Squad: Gadget Testers (2023 – present)
- OddTube (2019–present)
- Polkaroo Counts (2021–present)
- Polkaroo Reads (2022–present)
- Polly Can Do (2025–present)
- Rail Safety (2025–present)
- Run the Marbles (2025–present)
- ScienceXplosion (2020–present)
- Snack Attack (2024–present)
- Space Kids (2020–present)
- Stop, Look, Listen! (2024–present)
- Teeny Tiny Stories (2022–present)
- This Is My Family (2013–present)
- The Treebees (2025–present)
- Wacky Media Songs (2022–present) - Grade 1 to 4 social studies related series, brought in part by MediaSmarts.
- Wacky Number Songs (2021–present) - Grade 1 to 4 math-related series.
- Wacky Word Songs (2020–2021; 2025–present)
- Zamzoom's Animal Adventures (September 8, 2020 – present)

Acquired

- Animanimals (2019–present)
- Create (2019–present)
- Hushabye Lullabye (2022–present)
- Ladybird & Bee (2022–present)
- Little Malabar (2020–present)
- Trenders (2019–present)
- Urban Tails (2021–present)
- The Very Small Creatures (2022–present)

== Upcoming programming ==
===== Original/commissioned programming =====
- Flower & Flour (Q3 2026)
- Griffin and Turner (TBA)

=== Other programming ===
- All Too Clear
- The Agenda with Steve Paikin
- Legislative Assembly of Ontario Question Period (from the Ontario Parliament Network)
- Employable Me
- Great Blue Wild (2019)
- Human Plus
- The Life-Sized City
- National Geographic
- NFB Shorts
- Striking Balance
- The Water Brothers
- Heartbeat
- Sunday Family Movie

== Former programming ==
- Allan Gregg in Conversation with...
- Almost Home
- Ancient Civilizations
- Antiques Roadshow
- Art's Place
- Arts Alive
- The Ascent of Man
- Blackadder
- Borgen
- Brilliant Creatures
- Building Big
- Canada: The Great Experiment
- Canada: A People's History
- Chances Are, The Science of Luck
- Check and Mate
- Chef!
- Communiqué Agenda
- Concepts in Mathematics
- Concepts in Science
- Cope
- The Corporation
- The Darling Buds of May
- Degrees of Error
- Diplomatic Immunity (Canadian TV program)
- Doctor Who
- Down to Earth
- Dying at Grace
- Eco Engineering
- The Education of Mike McManus
- Explorations in Shaw
- Explorations in the Novel
- Film 101
- Fitness Over Forty
- For the Record
- Four for Adventure
- Fourth Reading
- Fragile Nature
- Full Circle with Michael Palin
- The Future
- Geography Skills
- Globe Trekker
- Going Global
- Golden Pennies
- Great Canadian Parks
- Great Canadian Rivers
- Great Migrations
- Green Heroes
- The Greenbelt
- Habitat
- Half a Handy Hour
- Hard Rock Medical
- He Knew He Was Right
- History Bites
- A History of Britain
- How the Earth Changed History
- Human Edge
- Imprint
- In Other Words
- Information Processing
- The Interviews
- In Search of...
- Into the Wild
- It's a Living
- It's Your Move
- Le jardin des sensations
- Joanna Lumley's Greek Odyssey
- Journeys
- Kay's Basic Cooking
- Keep on Moving!
- A Kind of Childhood
- Landmarks
- Landscape of Geometry
- Legends of the World
- Lemur Street
- The Life of Mammals
- The Long Chase
- Look Up
- Magic Shadows
- Magee and Company (1975–80)
- Many Voices
- Masterworks
- Me and My Inner World
- Medium Close Up
- Microbes and Men
- The Middle East
- Midsomer Murders
- A Million Ways to Move
- Mission Top Secret
- Monarch of the Glen
- More to Life
- Moving On
- Nature Watch Digest
- New Tricks
- Nightmusic Concert
- North America: Growth of a Continent
- Not Another Science Show
- Occupied
- The Omega Factor
- On the Move
- Ontario Scene
- Ontario Spelling Bee Championship
- Outreach Ontario
- Paperweight
- People and Pets
- Person 2 Person with Paula Todd
- Perspectives
- Pins and Needles
- Political Blind Date
- The Prisoner
- Prisoners of Gravity
- Profiles of Nature
- Queen's Park This Week
- Question & Answer
- Realities
- Recreating Eden
- The Royal
- Runaway Bay
- Saturday Night at the Movies (1974–2013)
- Saying Goodbye (1990)
- The Secret Railroad
- See, Hear!
- Self Incorporated
- The Shuttle Years
- Sociology
- Speaking Out
- Studio 2
- Supersense
- Sweatin' It
- Take a Look
- Tell Me a Story
- That'll Teach 'Em
- The Thin Blue Line
- Time Team
- Trial and Retribution
- Two Fat Ladies
- Undersea Explorer
- Understanding Human Behavior
- Understanding the Earth (1975, rebroadcast 1986)
- Unrigged
- Victorians
- The View from Here
- Vista
- Vista Presents
- Waste Not
- What's in a Name?
- Wild Animals of the World
- Witness to Yesterday
- Words Come Alive
- World of Nature
- World Religions
- Writing the News

=== Children's programming ===
==== Original/commissioned programming ====
- Acme School of Stuff (1994)
- The Adventures of Dudley the Dragon (1994–2000)
- The Adventures of the Aftermath Crew (1999; 2002–2003)
- Annedroids (2014–2023)
- The Babaloos (1996–1997, 2001)
- Backyard Bug Adventures (January 4, 2002 – 2003)
- Bali (2006–2010)
- Beats in Bites (2012–2018)
- Benjamin's Farm (2002–2003)
- Big Top Academy: School's Out Edition (2020–2022)
- Bits and Bytes (1994–1997)
- Bookmice (1994–1999)
- BrainBounce! (2001 – January 2, 2005)
- Can You Imagine That! (2015–2024)
- CG Kids (January 4, 2002 – 2008)
- The Country Mouse and the City Mouse Adventures (1997–2001; 2004)
- Creature Mania (2018–2025)
- Deafplanet (September 6, 2003 – 2005)
- Dino Dan (May 11, 2009 – 2018)
- Dino Dan: Trek's Adventures (2013–2022)
- Doggy Day School (2010–2019)
- Ella the Elephant (2013–2019)
- Elliot Moose (1999–2014)
- Finding Stuff Out (January 20, 2012 – 2018; 2024–2025)
- Finding Stuff Out with Zoey (2017–2023)
- Five (2012–2016)
- F.R.O.G. (1994–1995)
- Fun Food Frenzy (2000–2009)
- Gastroblast (2015–2021)
- Get a Life! (1998–2002)
- Giver (2012–2020)
- Grandpa's Garden (September 6, 2004 – 2008)
- Green Earth Club (1994–1995)
- Heads Up! (2005–2014)
- Here's How! (1994–1997)
- Hi Opie! (2014–2021)
- History Hunters (March 11, 2013 – December 30, 2013)
- I Dare You (2006–2009)
- I Love My Job (2018–2019)
- Inquiring Minds (1996–2001)
- Jack (2011–2020)
- Jerry and the Raiders (2016–2017; 2021–2022)
- Join In! (1989-1995)
- The Jungle Room (2007–2013)
- Just Like You (1994–1996)
- Kid Diners (2017–2023)
- Kid's Canada (1994–1996)
- Lilly the Witch (2004–2011)
- The Magic Library (1994–1997)
- Making Stuff (2010–2022)
- Mathica's Mathshop (1994–1997)
- Martha Speaks (2008–2015)
- Math Patrol (1994–1995)
- The MAXimum Dimension (1998–2000)
- Miss BG (2005–2017)
- Monkey See Monkey Do (2010–2021)
- Mr. Moon (2010–2013; 2016–2020; 2022)
- My Stay-at-Home Diary (2020–2021)
- The Mysteries of Alfred Hedgehog (2010–2017)
- The Mystery Files (2016–2020)
- Noddy (1998–2004)
- The Ocean Room (2009–2014)
- Off the Hook (1995–1997)
- Paper, Scissors, Glue (January 3, 2000 – 2002)
- Peep and the Big Wide World (2004–2017)
- Ping and Friends (November 10, 2018 – 2025)
- Polka Dot Door (1994 – September 4, 2004)
- Polka Dot Shorts (1994–2008)
- Pop It! (September 3, 2007 – 2017)
- Poppets Town (2009–2013)
- The Prime Radicals (2011–2017)
- Return to the Magic Library (1994–1997)
- Read All About It! (1996–1997)
- Readalong (1994–1997)
- Renegadepress.com (January 25, 2004 – 2005)
- The Riddle of Wizard's Oak (1994–1997)
- Rob the Robot (2010–2020)
- Rockabye Bubble (2000–2001)
- Seascope (2000–2003)
- Shutterbugs (2016–2020)
- Skooled (2006–2007)
- Sports Lab (2015–2020)
- Stuff (1997–2001)
- SWAP-TV (2002–2010)
- Taste Buds (2008–2015)
- Tati's Hotel (2012–2017)
- Téléfrançais! (1994–1996)
- Think Big (2008–2015)
- This is Turtle Island (2009–2011)
- Today's Special (1995–1999)
- That TVOkids Show (August 26, 2019 – April 8, 2022)
- TVOKids Teacher Power Hour of Learning (2020–2022)
- Vox (2000–2006)
- The Wacky World of Webster and Whim (1998–2000)
- A Week to Beat the World (2021–2025)
- What's For Dinner (2019–2023)
- A World of Wonders (2007–2016)
- Zardip's Search for Healthy Wellness (1994–1995)
- Zooville (2011–2016)

==== Acquired programming ====
- 64 Zoo Lane (2012–2016)
- The Adventures of Bottle Top Bill and His Best Friend Corky (2005)
- The Adventures of Paddington Bear (1997–1999; 2003–2005)
- The Adventures of Spot (2000–2003)
- Aliens Among Us (2002–2003)
- Angelina Ballerina (January 19, 2004 – 2005)
- Anne of Green Gables: The Animated Series (September 4, 2000 – April 26, 2014)
- Art Alive! (September 6, 2004 – 2005)
- Art Attack (1994–2011)
- Babar (2000–2008)
- Backyard Science (2003–2009)
- Bananas in Pyjamas (1995–2005)
- Bear in the Big Blue House (April 2, 2001 – February 2, 2007)
- The Big Bang (2001–2007)
- Bill and Ben (2002–2003; 2005)
- Bill Nye the Science Guy (1994–2000)
- Bing (2016–2024)
- Bitz & Bob (August 21, 2018 – September 1, 2022)
- The Blobs (2000)
- Blue's Clues (1999–2006)
- Blue Zoo (2015)
- Bob the Builder (2006–2008)
- Boo! (2003–2005)
- Boowa and Kwala (2008–2010)
- Brilliant Creatures (2001–2009)
- A Bunch of Munsch (2000)
- The Bush Baby (1994–1995)
- Bushwhacked! (2014–2018)
- Charlie and Lola (2005–2016)
- Chicken Minute (1994–1999)
- Chuggington (2022-2026)
- Class Act (January 5 – June 27, 2004)
- Cro (1995–1997)
- Cooking for Kids with Luis (2005–2007)
- Corneil & Bernie (September 5, 2003 – 2004)
- Cotoons (2005–2010)
- Corduroy (September 4, 2000 – January 31, 2015)
- The Day Henry Met... (2015–2024)
- Dinosaur Detectives (2000–2003)
- DisRupted (November 6, 2021 – June 24, 2023)
- Dinosaur Train (2009–2021)
- Dive Olly Dive! (2007–2011)
- Doctor Snuggles (2001)
- Doki (2015–2020)
- The Doozers (2014–2019)
- Dora the Explorer (June 2, 2003 – November 16, 2008)
- Dougie in Disguise (2006–2007)
- DragonflyTV (2003–2007)
- Dream Street (1999–2003)
- Eddy and the Bear (2002 – April 11, 2004)
- The Electric Company (2009–2013)
- Ellen's Acres (2007–2008)
- Elinor Wonders Why (2022-2026)
- Eric's World (1994–1999)
- Ethelbert the Tiger (2001–2002)
- Everything's Rosie (2010–2015; 2016)
- The Fantastic Flying Journey (2001–2003)
- Fetch the Vet (2001–2002)
- Fetch! with Ruff Ruffman (2006–2008)
- Finger Tips (2002–2013)
- Fireman Sam (1994–2001)
- Floogals (2016–2024)
- Frances (2008–2013)
- Friends of the Forest (1994–1997)
- Fun with Claude (2010–2015)
- Gardening for Kids with Madi (2005)
- George Shrinks (September 8, 2000 – August 25, 2012)
- Get Squiggling (2008–2013)
- Ghostwriter (1994–1996; 1998)
- The Girl from Tomorrow (1996–1998)
- Go, Diego, Go! (2007–2008)
- Grandpa in My Pocket (2009–2014)
- The Green Squad (2012–2015)
- Guess How Much I Love You (2012–2017)
- Guess What? (1999–2000)
- Hi-5 (2003–2013)
- The Hoobs (September 3, 2001 – September 1, 2007)
- Home Farm Twins (September 6, 2004 – 2005)
- Horseland (2007–2008)
- I Spy (2003 – September 5, 2004)
- Iconicles (2012–2016)
- Incredible Story Studios (1997–2000)
- Iris, The Happy Professor (1994–1998)
- It's a Big Big World (2007)
- It's a Living (April 18, 2004 – 2005)
- Jack's Big Music Show (2006–2008)
- Jakers! The Adventures of Piggley Winks (November 24, 2003 – 2007)
- Jasper the Penguin (September 8 – December 29, 2004)
- Jelly Jamm (2012–2016)
- Johnson and Friends (1994–2000)
- Junior Vets (2014–2018)
- Just William (1995–1997)
- The Journey of Allen Strange (2000–2003)
- The Jungle Book (2010–2016)
- Kit and Pup (2021–2025)
- The Koala Brothers (September 6, 2004 – 2008)
- Kratts' Creatures (1996–2001)
- The Large Family (2008–2013)
- Lily's Driftwood Bay (2016–2021)
- Little Bear (1999–2012)
- Little Bear (2024–2025)
- Little Ghosts (2002–2005)
- Little Lunch (2015–2018)
- The Little Prince (November 6, 2011 – 2017)
- Little Princess (2007–2014)
- Little Robots (2003–2005)
- The Longhouse Tales (2000–2001)
- Madeline (November 24, 2003 – 2005)
- Magic Adventures of Mumfie (1999–2001)
- Magic Mountain (1997–1999)
- The Magic School Bus (1995–2017)
- Maisy (2000–2003)
- Make Way for Noddy (January 7, 2002 – November 12, 2006)
- Mama Mirabelle's Home Movies (2007–2010)
- Merlin the Magical Puppy (2002–2004)
- Miffy and Friends (November 17, 2003 – 2006)
- Miffy's Adventures Big and Small (2016–2021)
- Mighty Machines (1994–2013)
- Milly, Molly (2008–2010)
- Minuscule (2007–2013)
- The Miraculous Mellops (1994–1995)
- Miss Spider's Sunny Patch Friends (2008–2012)
- Mission Top Secret (1996–1999)
- Mister Maker (2013–2021)
- Mouk (2012–2016)
- Mustard Pancakes (2007–2008)
- My Little Planet (1997–2001)
- My World Kitchen (2021–2025)
- Nelly and Caesar (2009–2013)
- The New Adventures of Lassie (2013–2016)
- Noodle and Doodle (2012–2014)
- Numberjacks (2008–2013)
- The Numtums (2012–2016)
- Oobi (2003–2005)
- Out There (2003)
- Paper Tales (2017)
- PB Bear and Friends (1998–2000)
- Penelope K, by the way (2010–2014)
- Peppa Pig (September 6, 2004 – 2014)
- Pins and Nettie (2021–2025)
- Pingu (1994–2008)
- Pinky Dinky Doo (2009–2010)
- Planet Parent (2005–2006)
- Poppy Cat (2012–2014)
- Press Gang (1994–1997)
- Pumped! (1995–1999)
- The Puzzle Place (1997–1999)
- Raa Raa the Noisy Lion (2013–2017)
- Rainbow Fish (1999–2001)
- Reach for the Top (2003 – January 2, 2005)
- Real Kids, Real Adventures (1999–2001)
- Ruff-Ruff, Tweet and Dave (2015–2021)
- Rupert Bear, Follow the Magic... (2007–2008)
- Sagwa, the Chinese Siamese Cat (September 3, 2001 – January 31, 2015)
- Sci-Squad (1999–2000)
- Serious (2003–2009)
- The Shak (2007–2009)
- Shining Time Station (1999–2000)
- Sid the Science Kid (2008–2015)
- Simon in the Land of Chalk Drawings (September 3, 2001 – April 10, 2004)
- Sing Me a Story with Belle (1996–1998)
- Snobs (September 11, 2004 – 2005)
- Space Cases (2001–2002)
- Space Racers (2014–2021)
- Spilled Milk (1997–2001)
- Splash and Bubbles (2017–2021)
- Spot's Musical Adventures (2000–2003)
- Spellz (2006–2013)
- The Stables (September 10 – December 31, 2004)
- This Is Daniel Cook. (2007–2010)
- Thomas & Friends (1998–2018)
- Tik Tak (2020–2025)
- Tilly and Friends (2012–2016)
- Timbuctoo (1996–2001)
- Time Warp Trio (2005–2007)
- Timothy Goes to School (September 8, 2000 – January 26, 2015)
- Tinga Tinga Tales (2010–2017)
- Tinpo (June 3, 2019 – 2023)
- ToddWorld (January 3, 2005 – 2008)
- Tommy Zoom (2007–2008)
- The Toothbrush Family (1997–1999)
- Tots TV (1994–2001)
- The Toy Castle (September 2, 2002 – April 30, 2006)
- Tracey McBean (January 4, 2002 – 2007)
- Treasure Champs (2019–2023)
- The Tribe (October 1, 2000 – 2002)
- The Triplets (1997–1998)
- Tutenstein (2005–2008)
- The Upside Down Show (2006–2008)
- Waffle the Wonder Dog (2018–2024)
- The Way Things Work (2002–2005)
- Wazoo! What a Zoo! (2002–2015)
- What's the Big Idea? (2017–2021)
- The Wheels on the Bus (2002)
- Wibbly Pig (2011–2018)
- Wicked Science (April 12, 2004 – 2006)
- Widget the World Watcher (1994–1997)
- The Wiggles (2000–2005)
- William's Wish Wellingtons (1999–2001)
- Wishbone (1996–2000)
- Wobbly Land (2008–2010)
- Woofy (2007–2008)
- The Wombles (1998–2000)
- Wonder Pets! (2007–2008)
- WordGirl (2007–2020)
- WordWorld (2007–2015)
- Yeti Tales (2018–2022)
- Yoho Ahoy (September 4, 2000 – August 29, 2003)
- Yoko (2017)
- Yoko! Jakamoko! Toto! (2003–2008)
- Zerby Derby (2013-2026)
- Zoboomafoo (1999–2016)
- Zou (2012–2020)

==== Interstitial series ====
Original/commissioned

- All About Art (2003–2007)
- Animal Fun (2020–2023)
- Are You Ready? (2018–2024)
- Artbot (2005–2015)
- Bamboo Love (2019–2023)
- Bamboo Loves Sports (2021–2024)
- The Bod Squad (1999–2012)
- Count with Gabby! (2021–2023)
- Critter Corner (2011–2020)
- Drew's Magic Tricks (2012–2016)
- Energy Blast (2004–2007)
- EnviroGirl (2009–2016)
- Gisèle's Big Backyard (2005–2020)
- Hippothesis (2011–2015)
- Homework Zone (2012–2020)
- I LOVE (2018–2024)
- I'm a Dinosaur (2009–2016)
- I'm a Fish (2018–2022)
- It Matters (2014–2025)
- Jackie's School of Dance (2008–2015)
- Kidsworks (1995–1996)
- Lady Vocab (2015–2023)
- The League of Super Citizens (2007–2023)
- Lejo (2016–2020)
- Manner Bot (2018–2022)
- Marigold's Mathemagics (2004–2005)
- Mark's Moments (2007–2016)
- Meet My Pet (2013–2022)
- My Canada (2012–2020)
- The Nook (1998–2005)
- Paw Patrol Minis (April 16, 2022 – 2023)
- Pet Superstars (2019–2023)
- Polkaroo's Awesome ABCs (2003–2007)
- Polkaroo's Number Wonders (2001–2008)
- Practically Perfect Party Planners (2014–2020)
- Princess P Party Planner (2012–2017)
- The Reading Rangers (2001–2022)
- Really Bend it Like Beckham (June 28, 2004 – January 2, 2005)
- Run Jump Play (January 7, 2023 – 2024)
- Space Trek (2011–2022)
- Story Explorers (2014–2019)
- Streetwise (2014–2021)
- Tigga and Togga (2006–2011)
- Time Trackers (2008–2015)
- Top of the Tops (2018–2022)
- Transform It! (2013–2019)
- TVOKids Jokes (2019–2025)
- Tumbletown Reads (2012–2021)
- Tumbletown Tales (2004–2021)
- Wacky Word Songs (2020–2021)
- Why? (January 3, 2000 – April 10, 2004)
- Wild by Nature (September 12, 2004 – 2007)
- YOUniverse (2014–2019)
- Zoomix (2012–2017, 2020)

Acquired

- Ace & Avery (2000)
- Animal Alphabet (1999–2008)
- Animal Numbers (1999–2001)
- Artifacts (2004–2006)
- Box Yourself Minis (2016–2020)
- Frankie and Frank (2018–2022)
- Funny Animals (2007–2008)
- HippoCrocoRhinoBuck (1995–1997)
- I'm a Creepy Crawly (2013–2016)
- I'm an Animal (2012–2018)
- Painting Pictures (2004–2007)
- Quizzine (2015–2016)
- Small Potatoes (2011–2015)
- Where's My Alphabet?
- You Can Do It Too! (August 21, 2018 – September 1, 2022)
- Zoe and Charlie (1995–1996)

== Sources ==
- TVO programs
