= List of programs broadcast by Knowledge Network =

The following is the list of programs aired by Knowledge Network.

== Current programming ==
=== Knowledge Network ===

- Animals at Work (2008–present)
- British Columbia: An Untold History
- Call the Midwife
- Coast
- Coast New Zealand
- Emergency Room: Life + Death at VGH
- Endeavour
- Great Blue Wild
- Heartbeat
- Hope for Wildlife
- The Indian Doctor
- The Island Diaries
- Jack Irish
- The Leading Edge
- The Legacy
- Mega Bridges
- Murdoch Mysteries
- Museum Diaries
- Silent Witness
- Storyville
- Waking the Dead
- Walking Through History
- Waterfront Cities of the World
- Wonders of the Universe

=== Knowledge Kids ===
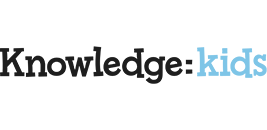

==== Original/commissioned programming ====
- 16 Hudson (2018–present) (resting)
- Audrey's Shelter (2024–present)
- Cutie Pugs (2019–present)
- Dino Dex (2025–present)
- Dream It To Be It (2024–present)
- Galapagos X (2024–present)
- The Game Catchers (2022–present)
- Interstellar Ella (April 24, 2023–present) (resting)
- Luna Chip & Inkie: Adventure Rangers Go (2022–present)
- Momolu and Friends (2022–present) (resting)
- The Ollie & Moon Show (2017–present)
- Pup Academy (2019–2022; 2025–present) (resting)
- Polly Can Do (2025-present)
- Riley Rocket (2024–present) (resting)
- Rocket Club (September 9, 2023–present)
- Tiny and Tall (2024–present)
- Wild Kratts (2011–present)
- Wolf Joe (2021–present)
- Woolly Woolly (2025–present)
- Wordsville (2024–present)
- Zerby Derby (2013–present)

==== Acquired programming ====
- Abby Hatcher (2019–present)
- Animal FanPedia (2022; 2025–present)
- Bea's Block (2024–present)
- Blue's Clues & You! (2024–present)
- Bubble Guppies (2024–present)
- Carl the Collector (January 14, 2025 – present)
- The Cat in the Hat Knows a Lot About That! (2022–present)
- Cleo & Cuquin (2026 – present)
- Clifford the Big Red Dog (2021–present)
- The Creature Cases (2025–present)
- Do, Re & Mi (2023–present)
- Hey Duggee (2023–present)
- Hey Duggee's Squirrel Club (2026–present)
- Isadora Moon (2024–present)
- JoJo & Gran Gran (2022–present)
- Kangaroo Beach (2023–present)
- Let's Go Luna! (2019–present)
- Maddie + Triggs (2025–present)
- Mironins (2022–present)
- Mojo Swoptops (2025–present)
- The New Adventures of Geronimo Stilton (July 2018 – present)
- Odo (2021–present)
- Paw Patrol (September 7, 2013–present)
- Peg + Cat (2022–present)
- Pip and Posy (2022–present)
- Pocoyo (2021–present)
- Ready Eddie GO! (2024–present)
- Rosie's Rules (2023–present)
- Shaun the Sheep (2012–present)
- Super Monsters (2022–present)
- True and the Rainbow Kingdom (2025–present)
- Vegesaurs (January 6, 2023–present)
- Work It Out Wombats! (2023–present)
- Xavier Riddle and the Secret Museum (2020–present)

Resting

- Astroblast! (2014–present) (resting)
- Big Words, Small Stories (2021–present)
- The Brilliant World of Tom Gates (2021–present)
- Dog Loves Books (September 6, 2021–present)
- Dragon (2013–present)
- Future Chicken Today Show (2024–present)
- Gus the Itsy Bitsy Knight (September 6, 2021–present)
- Hero Elementary (2020–present)
- Kazoops! (2021–present)
- Kid-E-Cats (September 2017 – 2022; 2024–present)
- Little Bear (January 2, 2023–present)
- The Magic School Bus Rides Again (2020–present)
- Martha Speaks (2008–2014; 2016–2022; 2025–present)
- Mixmups (2024–present)
- Molang (April–July 2016, 2020–present)
- Molly of Denali (2023–present)
- Peep and the Big Wide World (2004–2014; 2017–present)
- Puffin Rock (2022–present)
- S.M.A.S.H! (2022–present)
- The Sound Collector (2023–present)

==== Interstitial series ====
Original/commissioned

- ABC with Kenny G (2021–present)
- Cutie Pugs ABC (2020–present)
- Luna, Chip and Inkie (2013–present)
- Mia & Codie (2024–present)
- Run Jump Play (2022–present)
- Space Kids (2020–present)
- Sweet Tweets (2017–present)
- Where's My Alphabet? (2021–present)

Acquired

- Aliens Love Underpants And... (2024–present)
- Alphabet Stories
- Animanimals (2018–present)
- Bamboo Loves Music (2023–present)
- Bamboo Loves Parasports (2020–present)
- Bamboo Loves Sports (2020–present)
- Best Sports Ever (September 2017–present)
- Frankie and Frank (April 2018–present)
- Ginalina's Music Club (July 2016–present)
- I'm a Creepy Crawly
- I'm A Fish (2018–present)
- I'm a Monster
- Mini Smiley (2025–present)
- Mini Smiley Lullaby (2025–present)
- Obki (2025–present)
- Rookie Robot Explores the World (2021–present)
- Songs from the Bright Side (2026-present)
- That's Cool (2020–present)
- Tiddler (2025–present)

== Upcoming programming ==
=== Knowledge Kids ===
==== Original/commissioned programming ====
- Flower & Flour (Q3 2026)

== Former programming ==
=== Knowledge Network ===
- A Matter of Taste
- A Touch of Frost (1992–2011)
- Beautiful Noise (2008–2010)
- Borgen
- Born and Bred (2002–2005)
- Cracker (1995–2007)
- The Detectives (1992–1997)
- Doc Martin
- Dogs with Jobs
- Dotto's Data Café
- Do You Really Want to Know?
- Fake or Fortune?
- First Nations: First Stories
- Foyle's War
- Haida Gwaii: On the Edge of the World
- Hamish Macbeth
- Imprint
- The Inspector Lynley Mysteries
- Inspector Morse
- Janet King
- Land Girls
- Last Tango in Halifax (2012–2017)
- Midsomer Murders (1997–2012)
- Miss Fisher's Murder Mysteries (2012–2015)
- The Missing
- Monster Moves
- Oil Sands Karaoke
- Pacific Profiles
- Partners in Crime
- Planet Parent
- Quiet Places
- Rosemary & Thyme
- The Royal
- Scott & Bailey
- Two Fat Ladies
- Gaslight Gourmet
- Studio BC
- Triumph of the West
- Upgrading for Electricians
- Vera
- Whitechapel

=== Knowledge Kids ===
==== Original/commissioned programming ====
- All-Round Champion (2020–2024)
- Annedroids (2014–April 2017 – 2023)
- Bali (2006–2012)
- Blynk and Aazoo (2019–2024)
- Book Hungry Bears (2020–2022)
- CG Kids
- Dino Dan (2010–2019)
- Dino Dan: Trek's Adventures (2013–2020)
- Dino Dana (September 2017 – 2022)
- Finding Stuff Out (2012–2019)
- Finding Stuff Out with Zoey (2017–2020)
- George Shrinks (2000–2016)
- Genius Genie (April 2018 – 2023)
- Heads Up! (2005–2013)
- Hi Opie! (2014–2019)
- Jack (2011–2025)
- The Jungle Room (2009–2012)
- Kate & Mim-Mim (September 1, 2014 – 2024)
- KidZone (1992–2001)
- Lah-Lah's Adventures (September 1, 2014 – 2020)
- Marco Polo (2013–2015)
- Mr. Moon (2010–2014)
- The Mysteries of Alfred Hedgehog (2010–2023)
- Nelly and Caesar (2009–2012)
- Noonbory and the Super Seven (2009–2010)
- The Ocean Room (2009–2012)
- Opie's Home (2017–2019)
- Pop It! (2007–2010)
- The Prime Radicals (2011–2012)
- Poppets Town (2009–2012)
- Renegadepress.com (2004–2009)
- Rob the Robot (September 2010 – 2023)
- Shutterbugs (September 2016–December 2018)
- Super Mighty Makers (2019–2020)
- Taste Buds (2008–2011)
- Think Big (2008–2009)
- Timothy Goes to School (September 10, 2001 – 2012)
- Wibbly Pig (2009–2014)

==== Acquired programming ====
- The Acme School of Stuff (1989–1994)
- The Adventures of Dudley the Dragon (1993–2002)
- Adventures of the Little Prince (1984–1990)
- The Adventures of Paddington Bear (2003–2009)
- The Adventures of Parsley (1984–1993)
- The Adventures of Portland Bill (1988–1990)
- Alice in Wonderland (1990–1994)
- Angelina Ballerina: The Next Steps (2017–April 2018)
- Animal Stories (2011–2014)
- Art Attack (1995–2013)
- Arthur (2004–14, 2017–July 2018)
- Babar (2000–2013)
- Backyard Bug Adventures (2002–2003)
- Backyard Science (2003–2006)
- Bananas in Pyjamas (1997–2002)
- Barbapapa (1984–1987)
- Barney (1994–1997)
- Bear in the Big Blue House (2002–2005)
- Belle and Sebastian (Japanese TV series) (1986–1990)
- Belle and Sebastian (2018–2022)
- Benjamin's Farm (2002–2003)
- The Berenstain Bears (2005–2013)
- Bertie the Bat (1992–1994)
- Big Bear and Squeak (2012–2013)
- Big Flush (1999–2002)
- Bitz and Bob (2019; 2022)
- Bill Nye the Science Guy (1995–1998)
- Blue's Clues (2000–2010)
- Boj (2014–2017, 2020)
- Boo! (2003–2006)
- Bookmice (1995–1997)
- Box Yourself (April–July 2016)
- Bright Sparks (1995–1997)
- The Brollys (1991–1993)
- Bruno and the Banana Bunch (2007–2008)
- The Bubblies (1984–1987)
- Bump (1992–1995)
- Butterfly Island (January 1988–September 1994)
- Can You Imagine That! (2015–December 2018)
- Canada Crew (September 2017 – 2023)
- Challenge of the Unknown (1986–1988, 1990)
- Chocky (1987–1991)
- Chocky's Children (1988–1989; 1993)
- Chocky's Challenge (1988–1990; 1993)
- Christopher Crocodile (1995–1997)
- Clifford the Big Red Dog (2007–2014)
- Cockleshell Bay (January 1987 – 1991)
- Cooking For Kids with Luis
- Corduroy (2000–2012)
- Creative Galaxy (2015–2023)
- Creature Features
- Creepy Crawlies (1989–1993)
- Curious George (2014–2019)
- Danger Mouse (1984–1988)
- The Day Henry Met...? (January 2016–December 2017)
- Dear Aunt Agnes (1991–1992)
- Digby Dragon (September 2016 – 2018, 2020)
- Dinosaur Train (2009–2019)
- Dive Olly Dive! (2007–2014, 2016)
- Doctor Snuggles
- Doki (January–December 2016, 2019)
- Doggy Day School (2010–2022)
- Doozers (2014–2022)
- Dora the Explorer (2004–2009)
- Dream Street (2000–2003)
- East of the Moon (1990–1991, 1993–1994)
- Eddy and the Bear (2002–2006)
- Ella the Elephant (2013–2020)
- Ella, Oscar and Hoo (April 2018 – 2020)
- Elinor Wonders Why (September 6, 2021 – 2024)
- Elliot Moose (1999–2005)
- Elly & Jools (1991–1994)
- Eric's World (1992–1996)
- Ernest & Celestine: The Collection (2019–2022)
- Escape from Jupiter (January 1996 – 1999)
- Ethelbert the Tiger (September 10, 2001 – 2004)
- Eureka (1985–1990)
- Eyewitness (1997–1999)
- Fables of the Green Forest
- Fetch! with Ruff Ruffman (2006–2010)
- Fireman Sam (1998–2001)
- Five (2012)
- Five Times Dizzy (1987–1990)
- Floogals (April 3, 2016 – 2024)
- Franklin (2007–2013)
- Free to Fly (1987–1991)
- The Friendly Giant (1988–1998)
- Fun with Claude (2010–2014)
- Funny Animals
- Garth and Bev (2011–2012)
- Get Outta Town (2005–2006)
- Get Squiggling (2008–2009)
- Ghostwriter (1992–1995)
- Gigantosaurus (2020–2023)
- Giver (September–December 2017, July–December 2018, 2020)
- Go, Diego, Go! (2006–2010)
- Gran (1990–1993)
- Grandpa in My Pocket (2009–2010)
- Grandpa's Garden (2004–2008)
- Growing Up Wild (1994–1997)
- The Gruffalo
- Guess How Much I Love You (2012–2014)
- Harriet's Magic Hats (1981–1993)
- Hattytown Tales (1987–1990)
- Heidi (1991–1993; 1995)
- Helen's Little School (2018–2019)
- The Herbs (1985–1990)
- Here We Go (1992)
- Hi-5 (2003–2013)
- The Hive (2013–April 2018, 2019–2020)
- The Hoobs (2002–2004)
- Humf (2011–2012)
- If You Give a Mouse a Cookie (2019–2023)
- Inquiring Minds (January 1997 – 2000)
- Inuk (2008–2012)
- Igam Ogam (2011–2013)
- Iris the Happy Professor (1994–1998)
- It's A Big Big World (2006–2009)
- Jack's Big Music Show (2006–2008)
- Jakers! the Adventures of Piggley Winks (2003–2008)
- James the Cat (1988–1990)
- Jasmine & Jambo (2022–2023)
- Jeremy (1984–1993)
- Jelly Jamm (2012–2017, 2018–2020)
- Jerry and the Raiders (September 2016–April 2017)
- Joe and Jack (2012–2013)
- Johnson and Friends (1991–1998)
- Join In! (1991–1996)
- The Jungle Book (2010–2016)
- Kaboodle (1989–1995)
- The Kids of Degrassi Street (1986–1989)
- Kids Planet Video (1997–1999)
- Kioka (2012–2016)
- Kimba the White Lion (1985–1988)
- Kit and Kate (April 2017–April 2018, 2019–2022)
- Kitty Cats (1993–2003)
- Kiva Can Do! (April 2018 – 2021)
- The Koala Brothers (2004–2006)
- Kratts' Creatures (1997–2010)
- The Large Family (2007–2010)
- Lift Off (1993–1997)
- Lilly the Witch (2004–2013)
- Lilybuds (2019–2024)
- Little Bear (2001–2013)
- Little Ghosts (2002–2006)
- Little Robots (2004–2009)
- The Little Prince (2012–2016)
- Little Princess (2007–2011)
- Madeline (2002–2006)
- Maggie and the Ferocious Beast (2006–2013)
- Magic Mountain (1997–1999)
- The Magic School Bus (1997–December 31, 2016)
- Maisy (2000–2002)
- Make Way for Noddy (2002–2006)
- Making Stuff (2010–2023)
- Manon
- Mathica's Mathshop (1995–2001)
- Maya the Bee (2013–2016)
- Miffy and Friends (2003–2007)
- Miffy's Adventures Big and Small (September 2016–April 2017)
- Mighty Machines (2004–2012)
- Milo (2006)
- Minuscule (2006–2016, 2019, 2021)
- Miss BG (2005–2013)
- Miss Spider's Sunny Patch Friends (2009–2015)
- Mister Maker (2014–2023)
- Mister Rabbit (July–December 2018)
- Mofy (April 2016–April 2017, 2020)
- Monkey See Monkey Do
- Moominvalley (2021–2022)
- Moonjumper (1990–1991)
- Mop and Smiff (1991–1994)
- Moschops (1987–1990)
- Mouse and Mole (1997–1999)
- Mustard Pancakes (2007–2009)
- My Hometown
- My Little Planet (1997–1999)
- The Nargun and the Stars (1987–1991)
- Newbie and the Disasternauts (2013)
- Noddy (1984–1990)
- Noodle and Doodle (2012–2013)
- Numberjacks (2010–2012)
- Olliver's Adventures (2014)
- Olive the Ostrich (2012–2013)
- Once Upon a Time... Life (September 1988–July 1990, March–August 1993)
- Orm and Cheep (1987–1990)
- OWL/TV (1987–1992)
- Pajanimals (2013–2014)
- Paddington (1984–2004)
- Paper, Scissors, Glue (2001–2002)
- Paper Tales (April 2017 – April 2018)
- Parlez-moi (1981–1987)
- The Paz Show
- PB Bear and Friends (1998–2002)
- Peppa Pig (2004–2012)
- P. King Duckling (2018)
- Ping and Friends (2019; 2023)
- Pingu (1993–2014)
- Pinky Dinky Doo (2009–2013, 2017–December 2018, 2020–2022)
- Planet Echo (2011)
- Polka Dot Door (1982–1997)
- Poppy Cat (2013–2016)
- Popular Mechanics for Kids (1999–2011)
- The Power of Choice (1990–1991; 1993; 1995–1997)
- Press Gang (1991–1995)
- Puddle Lane (1988–1993)
- Puppydog Tales (1989)
- The Raggy Dolls (1990–1994)
- Rainbow (1985–1993)
- Rainbow Fish (2000–2004)
- Ralph and the Dinosaurs (2020–2022)
- Read All About It! (1981–1994)
- Readalong (1981–1988)
- Ready Jet Go! (July 2016–September 2017, 2019)
- Return to Jupiter (1997)
- The Riddlers (1990–1994)
- Rockabye Bubble (2000–2001)
- Rockschool (1988–1991)
- Rolie Polie Olie (2005–2014)
- Rub-a-Dub-Dub (April 1994–August 1997)
- Ruff-Ruff, Tweet and Dave (2015–2023)
- Sagwa, the Chinese Siamese Cat (2001–2014)
- Satellite City (1990–1993)
- The Save-Ums! (2011–2013)
- Sci-Squad (1999–2001)
- The Secret World of Polly Flint (1989–1991)
- Serious Amazon (2007–2008)
- Serious Andes (2008)
- Serious Arctic (2006–2008)
- Serious Desert (2006–2008)
- Serious Jungle (2007–2008)
- Sid the Science Kid (2008–2013)
- Simon in the Land of Chalk Drawings (1984–1990, 2002–2004, 2007)
- Size Small (1986–1991)
- Skooled (2006–2008)
- Small Potatoes (2011)
- Smokescreen (1997–1998)
- Space Cases (2000–2001)
- Space Knights (1990–1994)
- Space Racers (May 2, 2014 – 2015)
- Spellz (2006–2009)
- Spilled Milk (1999–2000)
- Spider! (1994–1997)
- Splash and Bubbles (January 2, 2017 – 2019)
- The Stinky & Dirty Show (2019–2024)
- The Story of Tracy Beaker (2002–2006)
- Supergran (1988–1992)
- Swap TV (2002–2006)
- Tee and Mo (April 2018 – 2022)
- Telefrancais (1989–1994)
- Teletubbies (1998–2000)
- Teletubbies Everywhere (2002–2003)
- This Is Daniel Cook (2004–2010)
- Thomas & Friends (1985–2016)
- Tickle on the Tum (1988–1991)
- Tidbits for Toddlers (1994–1997)
- Timmy Time (September 2016–December 2018)
- Tiny Tales (1990–1993)
- The Toy Castle (2001–2004)
- Today's Special (1986–1995)
- ToddWorld (2005–2007)
- Tom Grattan's War (1984–1987)
- Tots TV (January 3, 1994 – 1996)
- Tottie: The Story of a Doll's House (1985–1990)
- Tree Fu Tom (2012–2013)
- Trulli Tales (April 2018 – 2024)
- Tumble Leaf (2015–2020)
- The Tumblies
- The Upside Down Show (2006–2015, 2017–July 2018)
- The Way Things Work (2003–2004)
- We Live Next Door (1985–1988)
- Wil Cwac Cwac (January 1991–September 1993)
- Willo the Wisp (1984–1989)
- Windfalls (1989–1992)
- The Wind in the Willows (1986–1996)
- The Wombles (1986–1988)
- Wonder Pets! (2007–2010)
- Woofy (2005–2006)
- WordWorld (2007–2014, 2016–September 2017, 2019)
- Wumpa's World (2003–2007)
- Yoko! Jakamoko! Toto! (2003–2008)
- Yoho Ahoy (2000–2004)
- Zardip's Search for Healthy Wellness (1989–1993)
- Zoobabu (2010–2015)
- Zoboomafoo (1999–2012)

=== Interstitial series ===
Original/commissioned

- Nico Can Dance (2015–2016)

Acquired

- Animal Alphabet
- Animal Numbers
- Are You Ready? (2018–2024)
- Artifacts
- Bamboo Love (2019–2025)
- Box Yourself Minis (2016–2025)
- I LOVE (2018–2024)
- I'm a Dinosaur
- Learn to Draw ABCs
- Learn to Draw Minis
- Lil' Doc (2020–2025)
- No-No (2019–2025)
- Painting Pictures
- Really Bend It Like Beckham
- Schnezel Bronson's Alien Adventures
- Tattle Tails
- Tumbletown Tales
- YOUniverse
