= 2020 in Canadian television =

The following is a list of events affecting Canadian television in 2020. Events listed include television show debuts, finales, cancellations, and channel launches, closures and rebrandings.

== Events ==
=== March ===
| Date | Event | Source |
|---|---|---|
| 11 | The NBA has suspended the remainder of its 2019–2020 season "until further notice" after Rudy Gobert, a player for the Utah Jazz, tested positive for the coronavirus, resulting in a game in which the Jazz were facing the host city Oklahoma City Thunder at Chesapeake Energy Arena to be cancelled just as they were about to start (all personnel associated with the Jazz organization are quarantined until they are cleared), effectively leaving a large hole in the schedules of NBA TV, Sportsnet, Citytv, TSN, CTV/CTV 2, French-language RDS, and the league's regional sports network partners, as it pertains to the Toronto Raptors broadcasts. | |
| 12 | Following the NBA's lead of the day prior, several other sports leagues across Canada the United States announce a temporary suspension of play in an attempt to slow the spread of the coronavirus. Major League Soccer suspends all games for 30 days due to the coronavirus pandemic, while the NHL announces an indefinite suspension of league activity, which was later followed in the day by Major League Baseball's announcement that it has suspended its spring training games and delayed the start of their 2020 regular season (originally scheduled to begin March 26) by at least two weeks. The suspension of the three leagues adds another large schedule void for CBC/SRC, Sportsnet, Citytv, TSN CTV/CTV 2, RDS, and TVA, as well as the leagues' regional sports network partners. | |
| 12 | Both the Juno Awards of 2020, which would have been broadcast on March 15, and the 8th Canadian Screen Awards, which would have been broadcast on March 29, also have their ceremonies cancelled due to the COVID-19 pandemic in Canada. Both awards eventually announce their winners via livestreaming. | |
| 18 | CBC Television temporarily suspends production of local newscasts on nearly all of its owned-and-operated stations, replacing them with a simulcast of the national CBC News Network in order to "temporarily pool our resources into one core news offering"; the sole exception is the CBC North service in the territories, due to the need to serve indigenous-language communities. However, this move faces criticism in some regions, with politicians and media figures arguing that locally focused news and information is especially critical in a time of emergency. The move is partially reversed by the end of March, with local newscasts resuming in most markets. | |

=== April ===
| Date | Event | Source |
|---|---|---|
| 20 | The Canadian Film Festival and Super Channel announce a partnership which will see television broadcasts in May of the feature and short films that had been slated to premiere at the CFF prior to its cancellation due to the COVID-19 pandemic. | |
| 26 | CTV, Global, Citytv, CBC, V, Family, and other Canadian local and specialty channels partner on Stronger Together, Tous Ensemble, a special broadcast to raise money for Food Banks Canada due to increased demand for food bank services during the pandemic. The special featured musical performances by Céline Dion, Shania Twain, Alessia Cara, Michael Bublé, Bryan Adams, Jann Arden, Sarah McLachlan, Buffy Sainte-Marie, Barenaked Ladies, Arkells and William Prince, as well as spoken word appearances by Margaret Atwood, Tessa Virtue, Eric McCormack, Jason Priestley, Howie Mandel, Rick Mercer, Russell Peters, Will Arnett, Chris Hadfield, David Suzuki, Rick Hansen, Hayley Wickenheiser, Connor McDavid, Bianca Andreescu, Mike Myers, Geddy Lee, and Penny Oleksiak. It ranks as the most-viewed non-sports broadcast in Canadian television history, with 11.5 million viewers. | |

=== July ===
| Date | Event | Source |
|---|---|---|
| 16 | Launch of the Water Television Network. | |

== Programs ==
=== Programs debuting in 2020 ===
| Start date | Show | Channel | Source |
|---|---|---|---|
| January 2 | Restaurants on the Edge | Cottage Life | |
| January 5 | Endlings | CBC Television | |
| January 5 | High Arctic Haulers | CBC Television | |
| January 6 | Nurses | Global | |
| January 8 | Fortunate Son | CBC Television | |
| January 22 | Making it Home with Kortney and Dave | HGTV | |
| February 3 | Wall of Chefs | Food Network | |
| February 4 | Great Chocolate Showdown | Food Network | |
| February 11 | La Maison-Bleue | Ici TOU.TV | |
| February 16 | Landscape Artist of the Year Canada | Makeful | |
| February 20 | Tribal | APTN | |
| February 26 | Transplant | CTV | |
| February 27 | Fridge Wars | CBC Television | |
| February 27 | The Wedding Planners | Citytv | |
| March 4 | The Oland Murder | CBC Television | |
| March 6 | Happily Married (C'est comme ça que je t'aime) | Ici Radio-Canada Télé | |
| March 8 | David Rocco's Dolce Italia | Telelatino | |
| March 14 | Movie Night in Canada | CBC Television | |
| March 22 | I Do, Redo | CTV | |
| March 25 | All-Round Champion | TVOntario | |
| April 5 | What're You At? with Tom Power | CBC Television | |
| April 16 | Hot Docs at Home | CBC Television | |
| April 22 | Junior Chef Showdown | Food Network Canada | |
| May 8 | Good People | CBC Gem | |
| May 15 | Dead Still | Citytv | |
| May 30 | Budweiser Stage at Home | Citytv | |
| June 19 | Queens | CBC Gem | |
| July | Slo Pitch | OutTVGo | |
| July 2 | Canada's Drag Race | Crave | |
| July 21 | My Stay-at-Home Diary | TVOntario | |
| September 17 | Escouade 99 | Club Illico | |
| September 27 | Family Home Overhaul | HGTV | |
| October 7 | Trickster | CBC Television | |
| October 8 | Departure | Global | |
| October 18 | Because News | CBC Television | |
| October 18 | Enslaved | CBC Television | |
| November 1 | Rosemary Barton Live | CBC News Network | |
| Unknown date | Backyard Beats | TVOntario | |
| Unknown date | Broad Appeal: Living with E's | CBC Gem | |
| Unknown date | Group Sext | OutTV | |
| Unknown date | The New Reality | Global | |
| Unknown date | Striking Balance | TVOntario | |

=== Programs ending in 2020 ===
| End date | Show | Channel | First aired | Status | Source |
|---|---|---|---|---|---|
| March 30 | Lâcher prise | Ici Radio-Canada Télé | 2017 | Ended | |
| April 7 | Schitt's Creek | CBC Television | 2015 | Ended | |
| May 11 | Cardinal | CTV | 2017 | Ended | |
| June 7 | The Weekly with Wendy Mesley | CBC Television, CBC News Network | 2017 | Canceled | |
| June 10 | I Do, Redo | CTV | 2020 | Canceled | |
| November 11 | Trickster | CBC Television | 2020 | Canceled | |
| November 20 | Exhibitionists | CBC Television | 2015 | Ended | |

=== Changes of network affiliation ===
| Show | Moved from | Moved to |
|---|---|---|
| Being Ian | BBC Kids | Knowledge Network |

=== Television films and specials ===
| Airdate | Show | Channel | Source |
|---|---|---|---|
| January 8 | Rule of 3 | Crave | |
| March 13 | No Good Deed | Crave | |
| April 26 | Stronger Together, Tous Ensemble | CTV, Global, Citytv, CBC, V, Family, and more | |
| May 28 | Glass Houses | Crave | |
| June 24 | Queer Pride Inside | CBC Gem | |
| June 26 | We're Funny That Way: The Virtual Pride Special | CBC Gem | |
| June 27 | Pride Toronto Drag Ball | Crave | |
| July 27 | Being Black in Canada | CBC Television, CBC Gem | |
| August 1 | FreeUp! The Emancipation Day Special | CBC Gem | |
| August 14 | Fierté Montréal Drag Superstars | YouTube | |
| September 15 | 2020 TIFF Tribute Awards | CTV | |
| October 11 | Every Child Matters | CBC Television, APTN | |
| December 15 | Borealis | TVOntario | |
| December 15 | Mass Hysterical: A Comedic Cantata | Webcast | |
| December 18 | The Christmas Setup | CTV Drama Channel | |
| Unknown date | Inendi | CBC Gem | |
| Unknown date | The Lead | Crave | |
| Unknown date | Within These Walls | Crave | |

== Networks and services ==
=== Network conversions and rebrandings ===
| Old network name | New network name | Type | Conversion date | Notes |
|---|---|---|---|---|
| V | Noovo | | August 31 | |

=== Network closures ===
| Network | Type | Closure date | Notes |
|---|---|---|---|
| BBC Canada | | December 31 | |

== Deaths ==
- January 17 - Thérèse Dion, television personality (born 1927)
- January 20 - Kit Hood, television editor (born 1943)
- February 5 - Diane Cailhier, filmmaker and director (born 1947)
- March 7 - Earl Pomerantz, screenwriter (born 1945)
- April 3 - Logan Williams, 16, actor (The Whispers, The Flash, When Calls the Heart, Supernatural), fentanyl overdose.
- April 5 - Shirley Douglas, actress and activist
- April 7 - Ghyslain Tremblay, actor and comedian (born 1951)
- April 11 - Paul Haddad, actor (born 1963)
- April 19 - Claude Lafortune, television presenter (born 1936)
- May 7 - Joyce Davidson, 89, Canadian television presenter, COVID-19.
- May 10 - Martin Pasko, 65, Canadian-born American comic book writer and screenwriter (Max Headroom, Roseanne, Batman: The Animated Series).
- May 12 - Renée Claude, 80, Canadian actress (Avec un grand A, He Shoots, He Scores) and singer, COVID-19.
- May 16 - Monique Mercure, 89, Canadian actress (L'héritage, Providence, Mémoires vives), cancer.
- May 18 - Michelle Rossignol, 80, Canadian actress.
- May 22 - André Cartier, 74, Canadian actor (Passe-Partout).
- July 5 - Nick Cordero, actor (born 1978)
- November 8 - Alex Trebek, newsman (CBC Television) and game show host (The $128,000 Question, Reach for the Top, Pitfall and the American version of Jeopardy! among many others) (born 1940)

The year also saw the death of wrestlers Rocky Johnson, Bobby Kay, Steve Gillespie, all of whom performed in televised leagues.
