= Canadian Screen Award for Best Children's or Youth Non-Fiction Program or Series =

Annual Canadian television award

The Canadian Screen Award for Best Children's or Youth Non-Fiction Program or Series is an annual television award, presented by the Academy of Canadian Cinema and Television to honour the year's best non-fiction television programming for children produced in Canada.

The award was first presented in 2002 as part of the Gemini Awards program. Prior to 2002, a single Gemini Award for Best Children's or Youth Program or Series was presented, inclusive of both fiction and non-fiction programming; in 2002, the award was split into separate categories for fiction and non-fiction programming.

Since 2013, the award has been presented as part of the Canadian Screen Awards.

== Winners and nominees ==
Due to the distinction between the former Gemini Awards, which were usually presented in the late fall of the same year that the awards were presented for, and the current Canadian Screen Awards, which are presented early in the following year, for consistency awards are listed below under the year of eligibility rather than the year of presentation.

=== 2000s ===
==== 2002 ====
- Street Cents
- 21c
- The NewMusic: "Fight the Power: Music & Politics"
- VOX

==== 2003 ====
- Street Cents
- 21c
- A MuchMusic Special: Afghanistan
- Mystery Hunters
- SmartAsk
- VOX

==== 2004 ====
- Swap TV
- 21c
- POV Sports
- Street Cents
- VOX

==== 2005 ====
- Street Cents
- Angry Girls
- My Brand New Life
- Mystery Hunters
- nerve

==== 2006 ====
- Street Cents
- Heads Up!
- If the World Were a Village
- Prank Patrol
- Rocked: Sum 41 in Congo

==== 2007 ====
- Make Some Noise
- Ballet Girls
- Generation XXL
- Heads Up!
- Mystery Hunters

==== 2008 ====
- Ghost Trackers
- Drug Class
- Heads Up!
- Prank Patrol
- The Adrenaline Project

==== 2009 ====
- Mark's Moments
- Aquateam
- Mystery Hunters
- Sci Q

=== 2010s ===
==== 2010 ====
- Canada's Super Speller
- A World of Wonders
- Survive This
- Mark's Moments

==== 2011 ====
- Mark's Moments
- Artzooka!
- In Real Life
- Spelling Night in Canada: Canspell 2011
- Survive This

==== 2012 ====
- Artzooka!
- Finding Stuff Out
- Giver
- The Next Star
- run run revolution

==== 2013 ====
- Splatalot!
- Cross Country Fun Hunt
- Extreme Babysitting
- Finding Stuff Out
- The Next Star

==== 2014 ====
- Japanizi: Going, Going, Gong!
- Gaming Show (In My Parents' Garage)
- Giver
- Museum Diaries
- The Next Star

==== 2015 ====
- Finding Stuff Out
- Giver
- Tiny Talent Time

==== 2016 ====
- Science Max: Experiments at Large
- Gaming Show (In My Parents' Garage)
- We Are Savvy

==== 2017 ====
- Science Max: Experiments at Large
- Finding Stuff Out
- The Mystery Files
- This Is My Family
- Undercover High

==== 2018 ====
- Science Max: Experiments at Large
- Finding Stuff Out
- Just Like Mom and Dad
- When I Grow Up!

==== 2019 ====
- Just Like Mom and Dad
- It's My Party!
- Raven's Quest
- Super Mighty Makers

=== 2020s ===
==== 2020 ====
- Your Kids, Their Questions: A Your Morning Coronavirus Special
- All-Round Champion
- Backyard Beats
- Every Child Matters
- My Stay-at-Home Diary

==== 2021 ====
- All-Round Champion
- Gabby's Farm
- How Do You Feel?
- My Home, My Life

==== 2022 ====
- All-Round Champion
- Gabby's Farm
- Leo's Pollinators
- Raven's Quest

==== 2023 ====
- All-Round Champion
- Dream It to Be It
- Green Squad
- Sunny's Quest

==== 2024 ====
- Indigenous Art Adventures
- All-Round Champion
- Media Stamped
- Old Enough!
- Sunny's Quest
