= Undercover High =

Undercover High may refer to:

- Undercover High (Canadian TV series), a Canadian hidden camera prank comedy series which aired on YTV from 2014 to 2016,
- Undercover High (American TV series), an American documentary television series which has aired on A&E since 2018.
