= All for Kids =

- Genre: Children's television
- Created by: Media Farm
- Directed by: Phillip Tanner, Rami Fischler
- Country of origin: Australia
- Original language: English
- No. of seasons: 2
- No. of episodes: 80

Production
- Producer: Phillip Tanner
- Running time: 30 minutes
- Production companies: Southern Star Group; Talefinn Entertainment; Media Farm

Original release
- Network: Seven Network; Nickelodeon Australia
- Release: 10 November 2008 – 18 November 2011

All for Kids is a half-hour pre-school television series produced by Media Farm, commissioned by the Seven Network with Southern Star Group responsible for the international distribution on Series 1. The second series of All For Kids is being distributed by Talefinn Entertainment and Media Farm.

The first episode was broadcast on the Seven Network on 10 November 2008 at 11am, and ran for 40 episodes.

The premise of the program places kids firmly in charge: it is a show made for kids, by kids. It is the first significant Australian, wholly original half-hour series featuring presenters aged between six and eight years. Hosts Karl and Keira, chef Lindsay, gardener Madi, craft expert Christian, scientist Jameson. The show also has some guests like Sophie Hensler, Bronte Hodson, Liam Kingston, Bill Willamson and many more. They take the audience "on a journey into their lives by demonstrating how to cook, garden, do science and make stuff... their way". The show encourages children to do activities with their parents.

The series also features Mark Travers, a songwriter/musician, who teaches kids about the alphabet through music, song and animation.

The program is shot on Panasonic P2 HD cameras, which provide crisp, bright and colourful images. The first series filmed hand held and this offers a natural feel rather than being too staged. A steadicam was used in Series 2 The kids natural performances are much more important than perfect framing and the hand-held feel makes the viewers believe that this could take place in their homes.

The crew include Producer Jason Critelli, Producer/Director Phillip Tanner, Director Rami Fischler, Cinematographers John Brock & Nate Martin, Writers Phillip Tanner, George Dodd, Lyndon Barnett, Fiona Campbell and Leone Carey. Production Manager Lauren Bayliss, Production Assistants Sofia Madden, Dimitra Theodoulou, Marie Schleimer and Editors Christopher Mill, Hayley Lake, Michael O'Rourke and Baylon Davies.

The program is a logical extension from Cooking For Kids with Luis and Gardening for Kids with Madi, both produced previously by Phillip Tanner and Jason Critelli and broadcast on Nickelodeon (Australia). Indeed, All for Kids was broken down into interstitials for broadcast on Nick Jr, including Gardening for Kids with Madi (which included the original series), Make This for Kids with Christian, Science for Kids with Jameson and Cooking for Kids with Lindsay.
