= Bristol Mall =

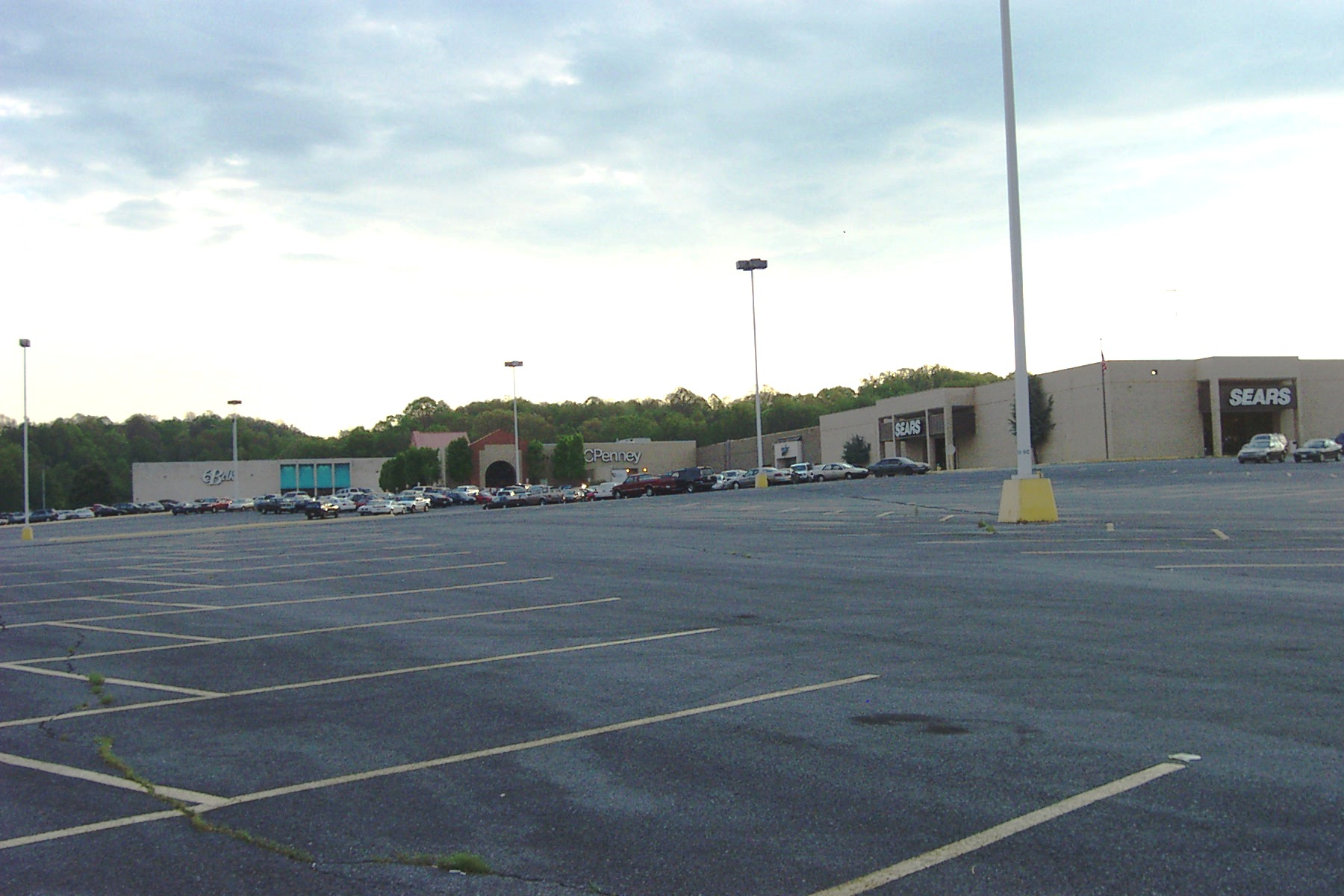
- Location: Bristol, Virginia, U.S.
- Coordinates: 36°35′55″N 82°13′10″W
- Opened: 1976
- Closed: August 31, 2017
- Demolished: 2021-2022 (only on Sears & JCPenney Wings)
- Manager: Hard Rock International
- Owner: Seminole Tribe of Florida
- Num. of stores: 0
- Num. of anchor tenants: 0
- Floor area: 486,169 square feet (45,166.6 m^{2}) (GLA)
- Floors: 2
- Website: bristolmall.com (Last Available Archive)

Bristol Mall was the only regional shopping mall serving Bristol, Virginia. It opened in 1975. Former anchors included Sears, Belk, JCPenney, and a movie theater. With Bristol being the home of country music, long before Knoxville or Nashville, for many years there had been a museum at the mall, showcasing the legacy this left to the area.

In April 1999, Bristol Mall was sold to Aronov Realty Management of Montgomery, Ala., from an affiliate of Urban Retail Properties, Chicago, for $25 million. The mall was sold to Bristol Mall Acquisitions LLC in 2006 for $18.3 million.

On August 3, 2015, local news station WCYB reported that Bristol Mall had gone into foreclosure and would be put up for auction. After an unsuccessful first auction, the mall was ultimately purchased by a family-owned real estate investment group, Sunstar Keshav LLC at a second online auction. Representatives from the company stated that they were committed to revitalizing Bristol Mall and again making it a viable retail complex.

The mall closed again on August 31, 2017, after the last remaining store closed. The mall's website was taken offline after this closure.

In April 2018, the Bristol Mall was listed as back on the market for $2.9 million.

On May 28, 2018, a pharmaceutical company revealed its plan to buy the vacant property and convert it into a cannabidiol production plant. The company, Par Ventures, said it would create around 500 jobs.

On June 6, 2018, Par Ventures finalized the purchase of the property. The property name changed to "Bristol Industrial Mall." In December 2021, Hard Rock International announced plans to reuse the existing mall facility for the Hard Rock Hotel & Casino Bristol, opening in 2024.

== Stores ==
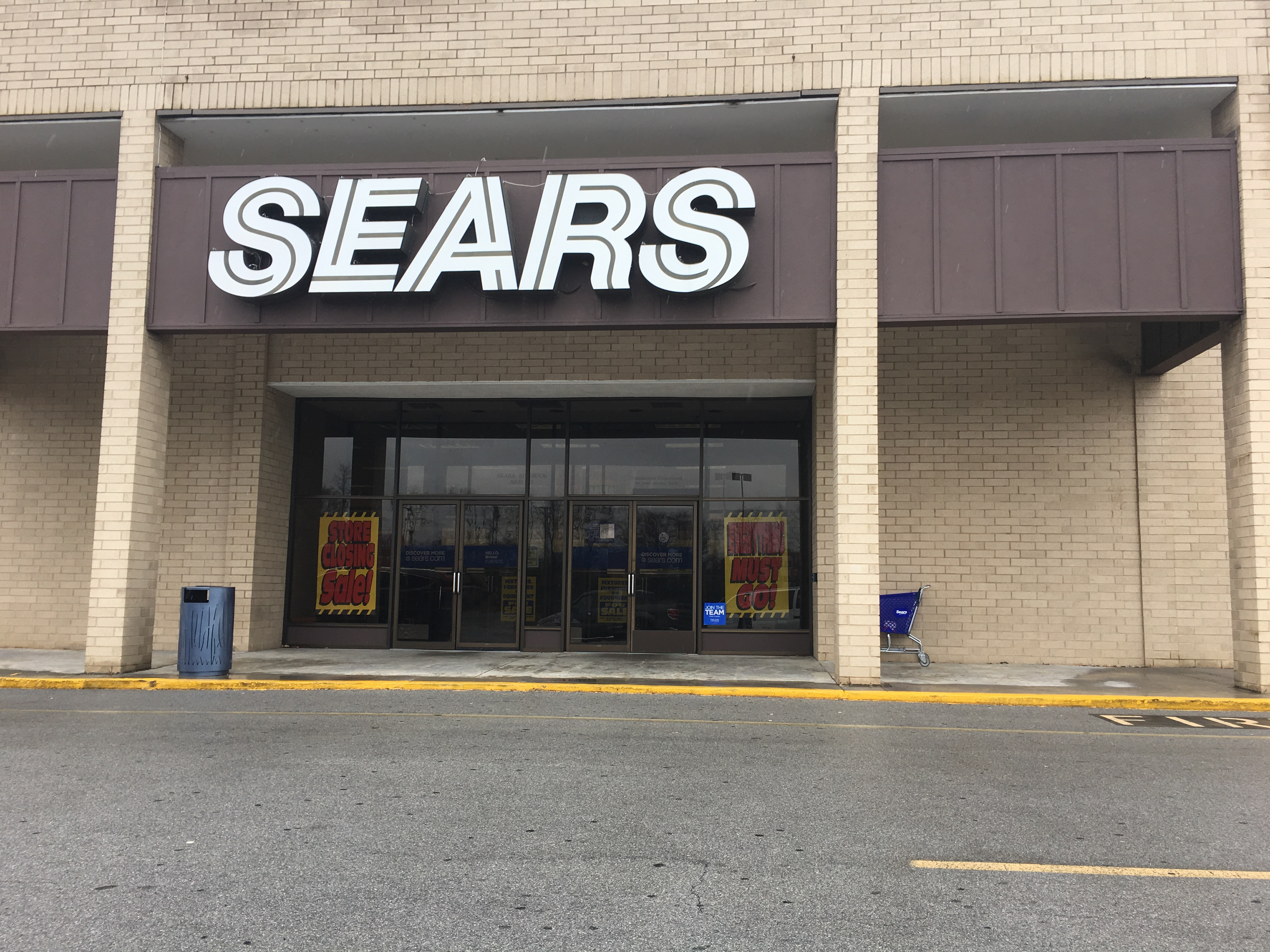
Liquidation sale at Sears

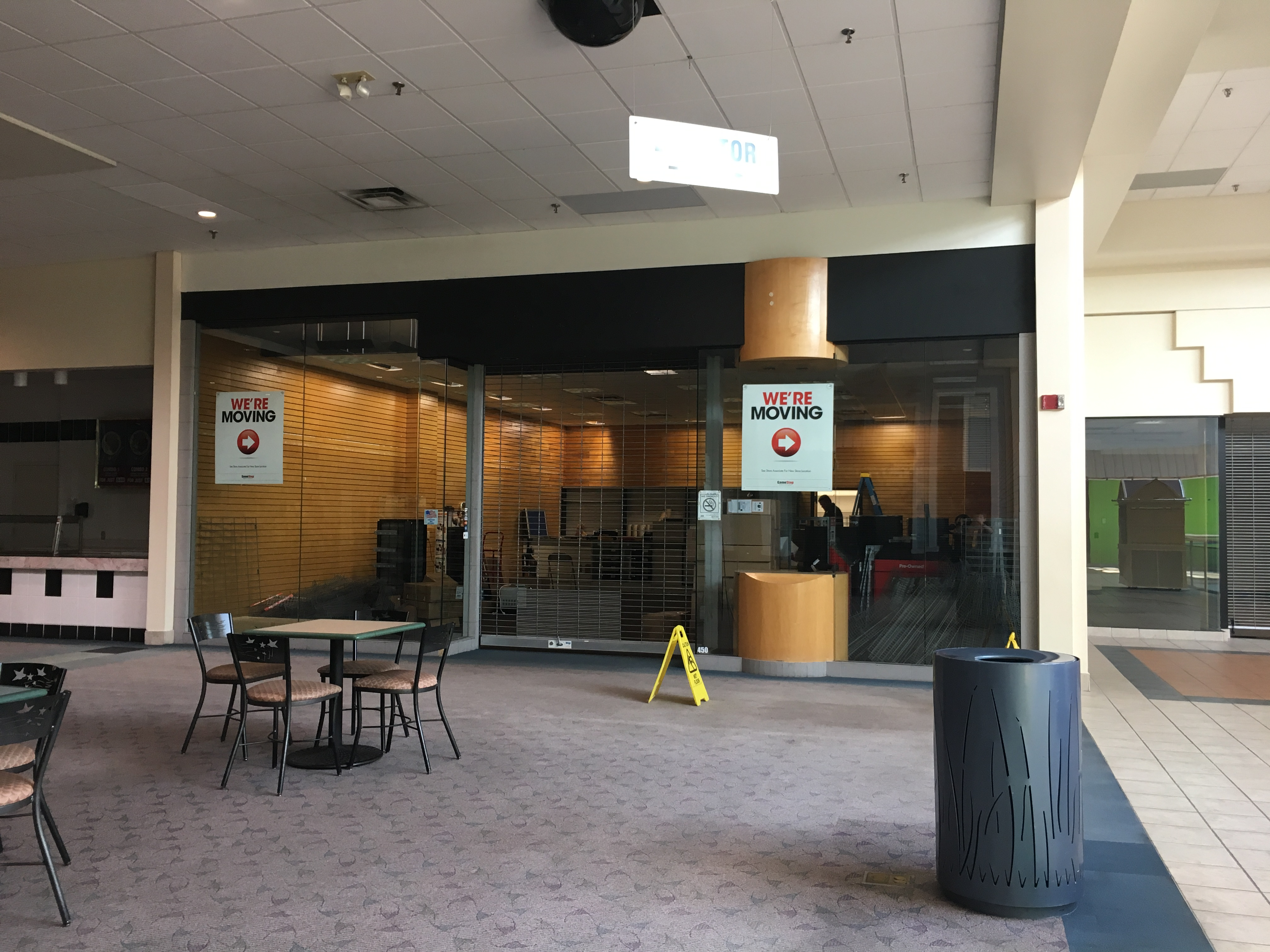
Former GameStop location

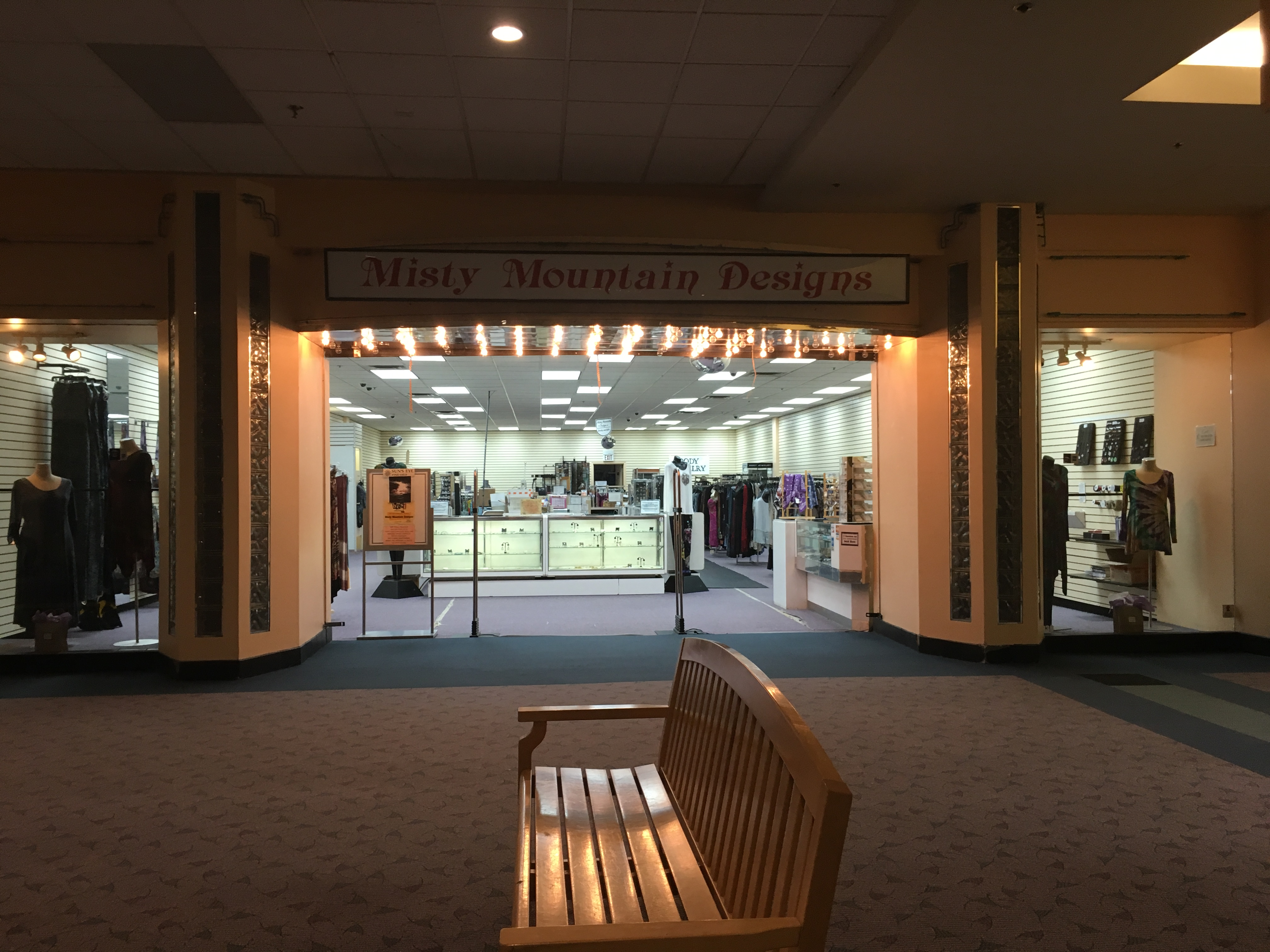
Bristol Mall Misty Mountain Designs on one of its last days

The mall's original anchor stores were Parks-Belk, Miller's and Sears. Bristol Mall had the usual mix of restaurants, mall services, fast food, and other typical mall stores, as well as a movie theater. There were also eight food establishments including Chick-fil-A.

In the late 1980s, Miller's parent company, Allied Stores, sold the Miller's chain to Hess's Department Stores. In 1992, Hess's sold eight of their stores, including all three of the Tri Cities locations to Proffitt's Inc. An 86,000 square feet JCPenney store was constructed as an addition to the mall in the mid-1990s. In conjunction with the JCPenney addition, the mall underwent a complete interior renovation.

In 2005, Belk Inc. purchased the Proffitt's chain and the Proffit's location was converted to a second Belk location in the mall, with the men's, home and children's departments relocating from the original Belk building to the former Proffitt's store, which was rebranded Belk Men, Home & Kids.

Piccadilly Cafeterias, an original Bristol Mall tenant since the mall's opening in 1975 closed on May 23, 2011, when its lease expired.

JCPenney closed in May 2014 as a part of a nationwide closure of 33 under performing stores. Later that same year, Belk announced it would be closing both of its anchor locations at the mall and consolidating the two stores in 2015 into one newly constructed store at The Pinnacle, a large lifestyle center under construction near Interstate 81.

On January 4, 2017, Sears Holdings announced that the Bristol Mall Sears location, including its Auto Center, would close in 2017. On March 26, 2017, Sears closed its doors leaving the mall without any anchor stores.

On February 20, 2017, local news station WCYB reported that GameStop would close on Monday, February 20 and that Misty Mountain Designs would close on Sunday, February 26. On June 3, 2017, Bath and Body Works officially closed their Bristol Mall location. Bounce Bristol announced on their website that they had temporarily closed their store. On June 23, 2017, it was announced that Belmeade Formal Wear is also closing leaving only one store left in the mall, KSS Instructional Aids. Ultimately, on August 4, 2017, KSS Instructional Aids announced that their Bristol Mall location would be closing on August 31, 2017, thus leaving the Bristol Mall without any tenants.
