= Hard Rock Hotel & Casino Bristol =

Casino and hotel in Bristol, Virginia, U.s.

- Interactive map of Hard Rock Hotel & Casino Bristol
- Location: Bristol, Virginia; 500 Gate City Highway; 36°35′55″N 82°13′10″W
- Opened: July 8, 2022 (temporary) November 14, 2024 (permanent)
- Gaming space: 30,000 sq ft (2,800 m^{2})
- Casino type: Land-based
- Owner: Hard Rock International
- Website: Official Site

Hard Rock Hotel & Casino Bristol is a casino and hotel in Bristol, Virginia. It is located at the site of the former Bristol Mall, which operated from 1975 to 2017. On July 8, 2022, the temporary Bristol Casino had a soft open at the site, with the permanent property opening on November 14, 2024.

== History ==
In 2020, Virginia legislators passed a bill allowing the establishment of casinos, but limited to five eligible host cities of Portsmouth, Richmond, Norfolk, Danville, and Bristol. An additional condition was set that each city must hold a referendum on the question of whether to allow casino gaming in the city. The legislation also establishes a commission tasked with distributing gaming tax revenues generated by one – Bristol – among the 12 counties and two cities within the Virginia Department of Transportation’s Bristol district. In November 2020, Bristol voters approved the casino referendum, with 5,427 voting Yes (71%) to 2,221 voting No (29%). Support for a casino in Bristol began in 2018 when two local coal barons, Jim McGlothlin and Clyde Stacy, publicly disclosed their plans to seek a change in state law so they can open a resort casino inside the former Bristol Mall, which closed in 2017. In November 2019, Hard Rock International announced their partnership with the local ownership group, which includes McGlothlin and Stacy, to own and operate the new resort and casino.

Hard Rock International announced in December 2021 that construction commenced on a temporary casino in the mall. In April 2022, the Virginia Lottery Board issued a facility operator's license to Hard Rock Bristol to operate Virginia's first casino. The temporary casino opened on July 8, 2022 as "Bristol Casino - Future Home of Hard Rock" at the former Bristol Mall in Bristol, Virginia. Bristol Casino will operate until construction is completed on the final Hard Rock Hotel Casino Bristol.

In June 2023, PBS Appalachia Virginia announced that it would construct a 4,000 sq ft (370 m^{2}) studio at the facility, which opened in March 2025.

== Southwest Virginia Regional Improvement Commission ==
The Southwest Virginia Regional Improvement Commission (RIC) is represented by 12 counties; Bland, Buchanan, Dickenson, Grayson, Lee, Russell, Scott, Smyth, Tazewell, Washington, Wise and Wythe; and the cities of Bristol and Norton. Each county and city appoints one member that is to serve a two-year term. The purpose of the RIC is to distribute gaming tax revenues generated from the Hard Rock Hotel & Casino Bristol; these are received in quarterly disbursements from the Virginia Lottery. Code of Virginia 58.1-4107.1 stipulates that funds must go to priorities that are to be related to education, transportation, and public safety.
