= Fleabag Monkeyface =

British-Singaporean animated TV show

- Genre: Toilet humor
- Created by: Knife and Packer
- Based on: The Disgusting Adventures of Fleabag Monkeyface by Knife and Packer
- Directed by: Jez Hall; Kok Cheong Wong
- Voices of: Bob Golding; Karl Woolley; Jules de Jongh; Keith Wickham; Teresa Gallagher
- Composer: Gregory Magee
- Countries of origin: United Kingdom; Singapore
- Original language: English
- No. of series: 1
- No. of episodes: 26 (52 segments)

Production
- Executive producers: Kok Cheong Wong; Henry Ong; Emma Tennant; Jamila Metran; Helen McAleer; Karl Woolley
- Producer: Jon Doyle
- Running time: 11 minutes
- Production companies: Sparky Animation; Impossible Kids; Editude Pictures; Walker Productions

Original release
- Network: ITV (CITV)
- Release: 19 December 2011 – 12 September 2012

Fleabag Monkeyface is an animated TV series that was based on the popular book series The Disgusting Adventures of Fleabag Monkeyface, written by Knife and Packer, and aired on the British channel CITV. The show follows the gross-out adventures of the eponymous hero and his two creators, Gene and Gerald.

== Production ==
52 11-minute episodes were developed and co-produced for television throughout partnership between Sparky Animation, Impossible Kids, Editude Pictures and Walker Productions, the production arm of children's publishers Walker Books. The series was aired on CITV and ITV from December 2011 to September 2012.

== Episodes ==
1. When Earwax Attacks (19 December 2011)
2. Attack of the 50-Foot Baby (19 December 2011)
3. Fright Night at the Phantom Fish Factory (20 December 2011)
4. Ninja Slugs (20 December 2011)
5. Gross Impact (21 December 2011)
6. Cirque de Fluff (21 December 2011)
7. Swamp Thing (22 December 2011)
8. Clone Bores (22 December 2011)
9. Grossa Cola (23 December 2011)
10. Bling My Blimp (23 December 2011)
11. Hair Today (26 December 2011)
12. Land of the Uber Worms (26 December 2011)
13. Gladiator of Gross Out (27 December 2011)
14. Feline Freak Out (27 December 2011)
15. Dung Zombies Go Wild (28 December 2011)
16. Disgustosaurus (28 December 2011)
17. Flower Power (2 April 2012)
18. Captain Maggotman (2 April 2012)
19. Raining Cats and Bogs (3 April 2012)
20. Yo Ho Ho and a Bottle of Scum (3 April 2012)
21. The Great Mold Rush (4 April 2012)
22. On Her Majesty's Secret Toilet (4 April 2012)
23. Dinner Crime (5 April 2012)
24. Pet Shop of Doom (5 April 2012)
25. Cockroach Safari (6 April 2012)
26. The Really Abominable Snowman (6 April 2012)
27. Escape From Alcatrash (9 April 2012)
28. Maggotman the Movie (9 April 2012)
29. Sk8er Ape (10 April 2012)
30. Goldenfry (10 April 2012)
31. Captain Lugworm's Deadliest Catch (11 April 2012)
32. Planet of the Fleas (11 April 2012)
33. War of the Noses (12 April 2012)
34. The Lion, the Witch and the Toilet (12 April 2012)
35. Surfin' Squidiocy (13 April 2012)
36. Save the Snail (13 April 2012)
37. Yucky-ee-Splat (3 September 2012)
38. Pet Idol (3 September 2012)
39. King Solomon's Fungus (4 September 2012)
40. Fleabag Monkey Fitness (4 September 2012)
41. Wake Up and Smell the Grotty (5 September 2012)
42. Leaning Tower of Pizza (5 September 2012)
43. I Screams All Round (6 September 2012)
44. Underpants on the Catwalk (6 September 2012)
45. The Karate Slug (7 September 2012)
46. There's a Fly in My Celebrity Soup (7 September 2012)
47. Return of the Dung Zombies (10 September 2012)
48. Down on the Slug Farm (10 September 2012)
49. Interview with a Monkey (11 September 2012)
50. Flushed with Success (11 September 2012)
51. Gross Encounters of the Third Kind (12 September 2012)
52. Welcome to the Bone Age (12 September 2012)
