= Mr Moon =

Mr. Moon or Mister Moon may refer to:

== Television ==
- Mister Moon (with Ed Leahy), 1955–1958 List of local children's television series
- Mr. Moon (TV series), 2010 Sparky Animation animated series

== Music ==
- "Mr. Moon" (Headless Chickens song), 1993
- "Mr. Moon" (Mando Diao song), 2002
- "Mr. Moon" (Carl Smith song), 1951
- "Mr. Moon", a 1994 song by Jamiroquai, from the album The Return of the Space Cowboy
- "Mister Moon", a 1963 single by Pat Boone
- "Mister Moon", a song by Ian Gomm and Jeb Loy Nichols, from the album Only Time Will Tell
- "Mister Moon", a 1950 song composed by Steve Allen and used as the theme song for the CBS Steve Allen Show and was the original opening theme of Tonight Starring Steve Allen
