= Sparky Animation =

Singaporean animation company

- Industry: Animation
- Founded: 2006; 20 years ago
- Founder: Dr. Kok Cheong Wong (KC)
- Headquarters: Singapore
- Products: Animated features
- Number of employees: 120 (2012)
- Website: www.sparkyanim.com

Sparky Animation is a Singaporean animation company. The company produces 3D animation content for worldwide markets. It also develops original titles and merchandises them globally through international licences. Their research department also develops CGI production tools and systems. The company is also a film distributor in Asia.

== History ==
Sparky Animation commenced operations in 2006 in Singapore, where the government provided subsidies for the entertainment industry. The television series Dinosaur Train was co-produced with The Jim Henson Company.

In 2014, the company had about 120 employees. It had a subsidiary company in Subang Jaya, Malaysia. and production facilities in India.

== Productions/collaborations ==
- VeggieTales (2007-2008)
- Dinosaur Train (2009–2020)
- Mr. Moon (2010)
- Jack (2011–2014)
- Fleabag Monkeyface (2011)
- The Disrespectoids (2011, Jammy)
- One Stormy Night (2012)
- The Fog of Courage (2014)
- Ruff Ruff, Tweet and Dave (2015)
- Shaabiat al-Cartoon (شعبية الكرتون) (seasons 11–12, 2016–2017)
- Dinosaur Train: Adventure Island (2021)
- Wonderoos (2024) (extensive animation production services only)

== Awards/Nominations ==
Dinosaur Train, a coproduction between The Jim Henson Company and Sparky Animation, received the highest viewership in PBS' history. It has also been selected by Hollywood's People Magazine as the Top Kids' Show. The toys developed from Dinosaur Train were nominated under the 'Toy of the Year' award category by the Toy Industry Association, in 2010. At the 38th Annual Daytime Entertainment Emmy Awards, Dinosaur Train was nominated for Outstanding Children's Animated Program.

Jack, a co-production with Groupe PVP Canada was nominated in the Best Animated Series category at the 27th Prix Gémeaux 2012. In May 2013, Jack won the Award of Excellence for the Best Animated Television Program (Ages 6 to 8) at the Youth Media Alliance in Canada.

One Stormy Night was nominated for the Best 3D Animated Programme award at the 2012 Asian Television Awards.
