= PBS Appalachia Virginia =

- Abingdon, Virginia; United States

Programming
- Affiliations: PBS; PBS Kids; Create; World Channel

Ownership
- Owner: Blue Ridge Public Television, Inc.
- Sister stations: WBRA-TV

History
- First air date: June 10, 2023

Links
- Website: www.pbsavirginia.org

PBS Appalachia Virginia is a PBS member station serving southwestern Virginia. Operated as a branch of Blue Ridge PBS in Roanoke, PBS Appalachia Virginia has no over-the-air transmitters and distributes its programming via cable and streaming television platforms.

It began broadcasting on June 10, 2023, to serve an area of Virginia without adequate public television coverage and where previous public TV broadcasting had been curtailed by financial and technical issues. It broadcasts from studios at the Hard Rock Hotel & Casino Bristol in Bristol, Virginia.

== History ==
Southwestern Virginia had previously been served by two retransmitters of Roanoke's WBRA-TV Blue Ridge PBS: WSVN-TV (later known as WSBN-TV) in Norton and WMSY-TV in Marion. The two stations were shut down in 2013 due to Virginia state budget cuts to public television, but returned in 2014 (on the two stations and WBRA-DT2) as Southwest Virginia Public Television (SWVAPTV). In 2017, the two stations went off the air permanently as a result of the FCC's spectrum reallocation auction (where Blue Ridge PBS sold the two stations' broadcast spectrum for $5.8 million). While other PBS member stations were theoretically available in the region, the Appalachian Mountains' terrain makes reception difficult.

In September 2022, after securing new funding from the Virginia Department of Education, Blue Ridge PBS announced that it would form a new member station for the region known as PBS Appalachia (later rebranded as PBS Appalachia Virginia at launch). The new venture—which was scheduled to launch by June 2023—planned to distribute its programming exclusively via over-the-top streaming platforms rather than broadcast television. While nominally operated as a unit of Blue Ridge PBS, the organization planned to treat PBS Appalachia Virginia as a separate operation with its own membership and hoped that it would qualify as a separate station with the Corporation for Public Broadcasting.

It initially announced plans to operate from a studio at the Southwest Virginia Cultural Heritage Center in Abingdon, Virginia. However, the combination of two non-profit organizations under one roof led to insurmountable logistical challenges and was abandoned. As a result, general manager Julie Newman contacted the owners of the Hard Rock Hotel & Casino Bristol, a casino then under construction in Bristol, Virginia. In June 2023, PBS Appalachia Virginia announced a partnership with Hard Rock Cafe to construct a 4,000-square-foot (372 m^{2}), glass-enclosed studio at the casino which opened in March 2025 and was promoted as being the first network television affiliate in the United States to operate from a casino. Construction of the facility was partially funded by Clyde Stacy and Jim McGlothlin, the owners of the casino.

PBS Appalachia Virginia launched on June 10, 2023; the service is distributed primarily via its website and apps, those of PBS itself, and on cable providers in the region. It also distributes local feeds of Create, the PBS Kids channel, and World Channel via its distribution platforms and cable providers. At the time of its launch, it was branded as the first "all-digital" public television station in the United States due to the lack of terrestrial signals.

== Programming ==
General Manager Julie Newman stated that PBS Appalachia Virginia would aim to "create content from the region, about the region and for the region—not just to provide viewers with mainstream PBS programming". Three of its first original programs—French Magnolia Cooks, Hometowns, and The Life of a Musician—were released ahead of the outlet's official launch. All three shows are locally produced.

== See also ==
- Knowledge Network, a public broadcaster in British Columbia, Canada, that uses a similar distribution model
