= Knife and Packer =

Children's book illustrators and cartoonists

- Notable works: Fleabag Monkeyface, It's Grim Up North London

Knife and Packer are Duncan McCoshan and Jem Packer, best known as illustrators/writers of children's books and cartoonists.

McCoshan and Packer first began working together in 1993 on various cartoons and cartoon strips for UK newspapers and magazines, including The Guardian and The Sunday Times. The It's Grim Up North London cartoon strip, satirising the growth of 'Islington trendies', was one of their first collaborative works and has been running in Private Eye magazine since 1999.

Their first children's book was published in 2001 and they have since produced over 30 books, based on characters Zac Zoltan, Captain Fact, Freak Street and Fleabag Monkeyface.

In 2010 they were commissioned by CiTV to develop their Fleabag Monkeyface series for television, acting as key creatives in storyline and character design. They were also lead scriptwriters. The series was transmitted on ITV in Autumn 2011.

Fleabag Monkeyface series (Walker Books)

- When Earwax Attacks
- King Pong
- The Creature from the Pink Lagoon
- Invasion of the Grubby Snatchers
- Moldfinger
- The Temple of Baboon

Freak Street series (Scholastic, Australia)

- Meet The Aliensons
- Meet The Zombiesons
- Meet The Humansons
- Meet The Wizardsons
- Meet The Supersons
- Meet The Vampiresons
- Aliensons On Holiday
- Zombiesons On Holiday
- Humansons On Holiday
- Wizardsons on Holiday
- Aliensons Time Machine
- Zombiesons Time Machine
- Humansons Time Machine
- Wizardsons Time Machine

Captain Fact series (Egmont)

- Captain Fact's Space Adventure
- Captain Fact's Creepy-Crawly Adventure
- Captain Fact's Dinosaur Adventure
- Captain Fact's Egyptian Adventure
- Captain Fact's Human Body Adventure
- Captain Fact's Roman Adventure

Zac Zoltan series

- Return of The Chocoholic Vampires
- Hypno-Dwarves and the Night of the Living Bed

Cartoon strips

- I Wish I'd Said That - BBC History Magazine
- It's Grim Up North London - Private Eye
- Preposterous Properties - The Times
- Perfect Couple - The Sunday Times
- Office Alien - The Guardian
- Bon Viveur - The Oldie
- Anne Finally - New Statesman
- Curator's Egg - Museums Journal
