= The Prime Radicals =

- Genre: Children's Education
- No. of seasons: 2
- No. of episodes: 52

Production
- Production company: GAPC Entertainment

Original release
- Network: TVOKids
- Release: January 15, 2011 – February 27, 2014

The Prime Radicals is a children's educational television series that demonstrates how math can be applied in everyday contexts. It features two cousins, Alanna and Kevin, who help their Uncle Norm solve his weekly workshop problems with the help of an expert and a mathematical solution.

The series targets children aged 6 to 8 and is based on the Ontario math education curriculum. Each episode features a visiting expert, such as a maze-builder, origami artist or firefighter. Produced by GAPC Entertainment of Ottawa, Ontario for TVO and distributed by Picture Box Distribution, The Prime Radicals features comedic actor and Ottawa area high school teacher Norm MacQueen as Uncle Norm, 12-year-old Kevin Wang as Kevin and 19-year-old Alanna Bale as Alanna. In each episode, 13-year-old Ayda Khan sings a math-inspired tune to reinforce the math lesson.

The Prime Radicals premiered on TVOKids, Saskatchewan Communications Network (SCN), CTV2 Alberta (Access) and Knowledge Network in January 2011. As of 2018 it's also airing on Starz Kids & Family in the US.

Season 1 features 26 episodes, each of a 15-minute duration. The series is produced in association with TVOKids, Knowledge Network, Saskatchewan Communications Network SCN and Access Alberta; and with the financial participation of the Canada Media Fund, The Shaw Rocket Fund, The Bell Broadcast and New Media Fund, and the Ontario Media Development Corporation (Screen Content Initiative Program).

The Prime Radicals Season 2 premiered on TVOKids in September 2013.

Season 2 features 26 episodes, each of a 14:30-minute duration. The series is produced in association with TVOKids with the financial participation of the Canada Media Fund, The Shaw Rocket Fund, The Bell Broadcast and New Media Fund, and The Canadian Film and Video Production Tax Credits and the Ontario Media Development Corporation.
