= Bamboo Love =

3D-animated short series

- Genre: Children's television
- Country of origin: Canada
- No. of seasons: 2
- No. of episodes: 52

Production
- Running time: 3 minutes

Original release
- Network: TVOKids
- Release: 2019

Bamboo Love is a 3D-animated short series aimed at preschoolers first aired in 2019. The show features the titular Bamboo Love, a panda, who loves to learn new things with the help of her animal friends.

Each episode is 3 minutes long, and airs on TVOkids, Ici Radio-Canada Tele and Knowledge Kids as an interstitial program. There are currently two seasons of Bamboo Love, with 26 episodes per season.
