= Mr. Moon (TV series) =

- Created by: Kate Veale
- Directed by: Andrew Hunter; Kok Cheong Wong
- Voices of: Gage Munroe; Gabriel Giammaria; Graeme Jokic; Julie Lemieux; Jake Goodman; Jamie Bloch; Quinton Samuel; Robert Tinkler
- Opening theme: "Mr. Moon, See You Soon!"
- Ending theme: "Mr. Moon, See You Soon!" (instrumental)
- Countries of origin: Canada; United Kingdom; Singapore
- Original language: English
- No. of seasons: 1
- No. of episodes: 52 (list of episodes)

Production
- Executive producers: Kok Cheong Wong; Daniel Slight; Frank Taylor; Patricia Ellingson
- Producers: Denyse Ouellette; James Schock
- Running time: 12 minutes
- Production companies: Sparky Animation; Skaramoosh London; Title Entertainment

Original release
- Network: TVOKids (Canada); Knowledge Kids (Canada); SCN (Canada); Playhouse Disney
- Release: 14 June – 8 August 2010

Mr. Moon is an animated children's television series co-produced by Singaporian animation company Sparky Animation, British CGI animation outfit Skaramoosh London and Canadian entertainment studio Title Entertainment. It follows the adventures of the title character, Mr. Moon, and his celestial friends—including Sunny, Gold Star, and Silva—as they travel in a small rocket ship and learn about constellations, space, and science through educational songs and games.

The series is of 52 episodes each of 12 minutes.

== Broadcast ==
It has been broadcast by Playhouse Disney (UK and Ireland), TVO (Canada), ABC (Australia), TVNZ (New Zealand), ATV (Türkiye), Zee TV (India), KBS (South Korea), PBS (Thailand), and Spacetoon Plus (Indonesia).

== Premise and format ==
Mr. Moon is a children's television programme that teaches children the names of stars and constellations. The show focuses on singing, games, and activities which children can join along too.

== Episode list ==
| No. | Title | Original release date |
|---|---|---|
| 1 | "Mr. Moon Flies a Kite" | 14 June 2010 |
| 2 | "The Jewel Box" | 15 June 2010 |
| 3 | "Sunny's Surprise" | 16 June 2010 |
| 4 | "Star Honey" | 17 June 2010 |
| 5 | "Sunny Loses her Shine" | 18 June 2010 |
| 6 | "Stella and Sigma" | 21 June 2010 |
| 7 | "New Stars Please" | 22 June 2010 |
| 8 | "Draco and the Comet" | 23 June 2010 |
| 9 | "Sunny's Sunset Show" | 24 June 2010 |
| 10 | "Coloured Stars" | 25 June 2010 |
| 11 | "Anyold's Garden" | 28 June 2010 |
| 12 | "Adventurous Star" | 29 June 2010 |
| 13 | "Sirius the Wonder Dog" | 30 June 2010 |
| 14 | "Anyold's Asteroids" | 1 July 2010 |
| 15 | "Cloud Dolphin" | 2 July 2010 |
| 16 | "The Maze" | 3 July 2010 |
| 17 | "Stella's Jewels" | 4 July 2010 |
| 18 | "Little Sun" | 5 July 2010 |
| 19 | "Space Orchestra" | 6 July 2010 |
| 20 | "Colour is Laughter" | 7 July 2010 |
| 21 | "Dark Clouds" | 8 July 2010 |
| 22 | "Jump" | 9 July 2010 |
| 23 | "Diamond Rain" | 10 July 2010 |
| 24 | "Sunny's Friend" | 11 July 2010 |
| 25 | "No Snow Below" | 12 July 2010 |
| 26 | "Wishing Star" | 13 July 2010 |
| 27 | "Anyold's Friend" | 14 July 2010 |
| 28 | "Accidents Happen" | 15 July 2010 |
| 29 | "Bye Bye Bluey" | 16 July 2010 |
| 30 | "Shhhhhhhh" | 17 July 2010 |
| 31 | "Dancing with the Stars" | 18 July 2010 |
| 32 | "Neighbours" | 19 July 2010 |
| 33 | "Crab in a Pinch" | 20 July 2010 |
| 34 | "Sorry Sunny" | 21 July 2010 |
| 35 | "A Clean Space" | 22 July 2010 |
| 36 | "A Fine Line" | 23 July 2010 |
| 37 | "Anyold and the Ice Asteroid" | 24 July 2010 |
| 38 | "The Great Space Race" | 25 July 2010 |
| 39 | "Triangle" | 26 July 2010 |
| 40 | "Skating Party" | 27 July 2010 |
| 41 | "Be the Bee" | 28 July 2010 |
| 42 | "Find Taurus" | 29 July 2010 |
| 43 | "Music Machine" | 30 July 2010 |
| 44 | "Sunny's Funnies" | 31 July 2010 |
| 45 | "The Asteroid Problem" | 1 August 2010 |
| 46 | "Could It Bea" | 2 August 2010 |
| 47 | "The Mysterious Invention" | 3 August 2010 |
| 48 | "Everyone Can Play" | 4 August 2010 |
| 49 | "Show and Tell" | 5 August 2010 |
| 50 | "Tell a Story" | 6 August 2010 |
| 51 | "Surprise Plan" | 7 August 2010 |
| 52 | "It Takes a Friend" | 8 August 2010 |

== Production ==
Development of the adaptation of Kate Veale's book series Mr. Moon was announced in September 2002, when Covent Garden-based British CGI animation production company Skaramoosh and British children's entertainment studio 2 Sides TV announced an adaptation of Kate Veale's preschool book series Mr. Moon into a CGI-animated series with British actor Martin Jarvis originally set to narrate the series while Skaramoosh' director Andrew Hunter & MD Daniel Slight would serve as director & executive producer for the then-upcoming CGI-animated adaptation while 2 Side TV's Catherine Robbins & the book series' author Kate Veale would serve as executive producers. Three years later on 30 March 2004, nearly three years after development & production for the series Mr. Moon started, the series eventually became a British/Canadian co-production when Ottawa-based Canadian animation studio Funbag Animation Studios had joined the series as a co-producer alongside South African company VFX Lab & the former would handle animation services for the series however London-based British CGI studio Skaramoosh would still be involved, while 2 Sides TV had dropped out of the upcoming CGI-animated adaptation of Mr. Moon, S4C had brought the Welsh-language rights to air the series in Wales while its distribution arm S4C International had brought distribution rights to the upcoming series.

In September 2009, when Ottawa-based animation studio Funbag Animation Studio shut down two years prior in 2007 during production of Mr. Moon, Toronto-based Canadian production & distribution company Title Entertainment, a company founded in 2004 by Frank Taylor, had replaced Funbag Animation Studios as a co-producer while the series adaptation of Kate Veale's book series Mr. Moon had become a British/Canadian/Singaporian co-production when Singaporian animation production outfit Sparky Animation, a Singaporian company founded in 2006, had joined the series as a co-producer & they would handle animation production services in its Singaporian studio while Sparky Animation's founder Kok Cheong Wong & Title Entertainment's founder Frank Taylor would serve as executive producers while Kok Cheong Wong would serve as co-director.

Two weeks later in that same month, British children's TV channel Playhouse Disney UK and three Canadian regional television broadcasting networks TVOntario, Knowledge Network and SCN had brought British & Canadian television broadcasting rights to the then-upcoming TV series Mr. Moon and would air the series the following year in 2010.

=== Animation ===
Covent Garden-based British CGI animation studio & VFX company Skaramoosh was set to handle animation services in its in-house studio until Ottawa-based Canadian animation production company Funbag Animation Studios had assumed the role of handling animation services for the series when it joined the series as a co-producer. But when Funbag Animation Studios had shut down in April 2007, Singaporian animation production company Sparky Animation had taken over animation production & replaced Funbag as it handles animation production services for the adaptation Kate Veale's preschool book series Mr. Moon alongside London-based British animation production studio Skaramoosh.

== Broadcast ==
In January 2011, Australian broadcaster Australian Broadcasting Corporation had brought the rights to air the series on ABC2 for its children's block ABC Kids on 2.
