= All Too Clear =

Environmental docu-series

- Genre: Documentary
- Directed by: Zach Melnick, Yvonne Drebert
- Starring: Mark Holey, Samantha Koyen
- Countries of origin: Canada, United States
- Original language: English
- No. of seasons: 1
- No. of episodes: 3

Production
- Producers: Yvonne Drebert, Zach Melnick
- Cinematography: Zach Melnick
- Running time: 55 minutes
- Production company: Inspired Planet Productions

Original release
- Network: TVO
- Release: October 26 – November 9, 2024

All Too Clear is a Canadian–American documentary television series directed by Zach Melnick and Yvonne Drebert. The three-part series examines the ecological impact of invasive quagga mussels in the Great Lakes using custom-built underwater remotely operated vehicles (ROVs) and over 150 days of underwater filming.

Filming occurred off the Bruce Peninsula in Ontario, where colder, deeper waters posed logistical challenges. The filmmakers aimed to make freshwater science accessible to a broad audience. The series features lake whitefish spawning, shifts in water clarity, and the discovery of the SS Africa wreck.

== Discoveries ==
The wreck of the SS Africa, a wooden steamship that sank in Lake Huron in October 1895, was located at approximately 85 metres depth. Visibility was aided by water filtration from quagga mussels.

== Production and release ==
Filming occurred from July 2022 to October 2023. Versions of the content include the original three-part series and a feature-length cut, with footage provided by specialized ROVs.

The premiere took place on August 10, 2024, at the Stockey Centre in Parry Sound, Ontario. Additional screenings occurred at community venues and the 2025 International Association for Great Lakes Research conference. TVO aired the series from October 26, 2024, followed by screenings at the City Opera House in Traverse City, Michigan.

Scientists Mark Holey and Samantha Koyen feature in the series, discussing water quality, invasive species, and fisheries management.

== Accolades ==
It was Winner, Sanctuary Selections Competition, Thunder Bay International Film Festival (2025).

== Episodes ==
Episode	Title	Length	Summary
1	"The Last Whitefish"	54:43	Follows lake whitefish through spawning, hatching, and early development. Featured scientists explain how quagga mussels have changed water clarity and food chains.
2	"Muddy the Waters"	54:16	Covers strategies to limit quagga mussel spread, including robotic removal and an experimental “Judas” mussel prototype.
3	"A Silver Lining"	55:16	Examines habitat restoration and native fish reintroduction efforts, such as cisco and river-run whitefish projects.

== Scientific significance ==
The documentary shows how quagga mussels act as ecosystem engineers by filtering significant water volumes, which increases clarity but reduces phytoplankton. This shift alters nutrient distribution and impacts native species. It also explores efforts to manage invasive populations and support habitat restoration.
