= Undercover High (Canadian TV series) =

Canadian high school prank show

Undercover High is a Canadian youth comedy series, which premiered on YTV in 2014. A hidden camera prank show, the series staged pranks on students at high schools.

The series was produced by General Purpose Entertainment, and hosted by Lisa Gilroy, who was also a host of YTV.

Gilroy received a Canadian Screen Award nomination for Best Host in a Children's, Preschool or Youth Program or Series at the 3rd Canadian Screen Awards in 2015, and the series was nominated for Best Children's or Youth Non-Fiction Program or Series at the 6th Canadian Screen Awards.
