= Gardening for Kids with Madi =

- Genre: Children's television series
- Created by: Phillip Tanner
- Starring: Madison de Sousa
- Theme music composer: Angela Little
- Country of origin: Australia
- Original language: English
- No. of seasons: 1
- No. of episodes: 20

Production
- Producers: Dina Panozzo; Jason Critelli
- Editors: Enzo Tedeschi; Hayley Lake; Christopher Mill
- Running time: 5 minutes
- Production companies: Total Perception; Nickelodeon Australia

Original release
- Network: Nick Jr. Australia
- Release: 16 September 2006 – 2008

Related
- All for Kids; Cooking for Kids with Luis

Gardening for Kids with Madi (called Madi's Garden on Discovery Kids Asia) is an Australian series of shorts for preschoolers. It is a follow-up to Cooking for Kids with Luis from the same creators (Luis also appeared in some of the episodes). The shorts are about a green-fingered girl named Madi who teaches viewers how to garden. Madi loves gardening because she likes to learn about different plants.

The first short aired in 2006 on Nick Jr. Australia. Later on, new shorts with Madi were made for the All for Kids show on the Seven Network. The gardening segments from All for Kids were then broadcast on Nick Jr. Australia beginning on 29 December 2008.

In 2007, the show won the ASTRA Award for Most Outstanding Children's Program.

== Episodes ==
One season of 20 episodes was made.

=== List ===
- Tools for the Garden – Madi shows viewers the essential tools of gardening.
- Grow Your Own Salad – Madi shows viewers how to plant a vegetable patch.
- Rock Garden for a Rock Concert – Madi builds a rock garden for a blue-tongued lizard.
- At the Nursery – Madi visits her favorite nursery.
- Making Compost – Madi explains what compost is, and how it helps gardens.
- Working Bee – Madi's friends Aisling and Niamh need her help making a garden.
- Big Ideas for a Little Garden – Madi helps make a garden small enough for an apartment.
- Botanic Gardens Adventure – Madi and her cousin Naomi visit the Botanic Gardens.
- Sandpit for Conor – Madi's friend Conor wants to recreate the beach in his backyard.
- Off to the Show – Madi and Naomi visit a fair to find the perfect plant.
- Native Plants – Madi visits a native plant nursery and finds a rare Wollomi Pine.
- Cubby with Dad and Cam – Madi's brother and father join her in making a cubby.
- Worm Farm – Madi creates her own worm farm and gets new earthworm pets.
- Herbs Herbs Herbs – Madi buys a variety of herbs and shows viewers how to plant them.
- The Great Glass Pyramid – Madi takes Naomi to a greenhouse to see exotic orchids.
- Garden for the School Yard – Madi convinces her class to help create a new school garden.
- Rabbit Hutch for Starsky – Madi builds a portable hutch for her pet rabbit, Starsky.
- Flower Market – Madi visits the flower market early in the morning.
- A Visit to the Orchard – Madi goes to a fruit orchard to pick persimmons.
- Bird Bath – Madi gets a birdbath for her friend Rachel, whose yard is home to many birds.

== Broadcast ==
The series aired on Nick Jr. Australia in its country of origin. It also aired on TVOntario in Canada and Discovery Kids in Asia.

== Awards ==
The program was nominated for two ASTRA Awards in 2007, winning the ASTRA for Most Outstanding Children's Program. Madi was nominated as Most Outstanding Television Presenter. Editor Enzo Tedeschi received an Australian Screen Editors nomination in 2008 for his work on the show, in the "Best Editing in a Non-Drama Television Programme" category.
