= Gabby's Farm =

Canadian children's television series

Gabby's Farm is a Canadian children's television series, which debuted in 2021 on TVOntario. Hosted by Gabby Sharpe, a young girl who lives with her parents on a farm in rural Guelph/Eramosa, the series introduces viewers to the animals, equipment and activities of farm living.

The series received a Canadian Screen Award nomination for Best Children's or Youth Non-fiction Series at the 10th Canadian Screen Awards in 2022.
