= Backyard Beats =

Canadian children's television series

- Genre: Children's television series
- Written by: Valerie Sara Cardinal; Madeleine Donohue; Ivan Hutomo; Melissa Peters; Tyra Sweet; Jillian Welsh
- Directed by: Daniel Bourré; Steve Diguer; Merissa Simonian; Drew Dafoe
- Starring: Monica Brighton
- Music by: Greg Johnson
- Country of origin: Canada
- Original language: English
- No. of seasons: 2
- No. of episodes: 52

Production
- Executive producers: Daniel Bourré; Sean Connolly; Marney Malabar; Marlo Miazga; Julie Bristow; Bruno Dubé; Corinna Lehr
- Producers: Millan Curry-Sharples; Chloe Gray; Anthony Gullace; Sean Leahy; Esther Nip; Caroline Voitovici; Richard H. Campbell; Agustin Guevara
- Cinematography: Tom Bellisario
- Editors: Janna Jeffrey; Jessica Graore; Joel Pylyshyn; Mike Reisacher; Brent McCready; Rod Christie
- Running time: 11 minutes
- Production companies: Bristow Global Media; Sphere Media

Original release
- Network: TVOntario
- Release: May 20, 2020 – present

Backyard Beats is a Canadian children's television series, which premiered on TVOntario in 2020. Hosted by Monica Brighton, the series profiles do it yourself approaches to making music, through a format which sees a professional musician visit to teach her about a musical genre or instrument, following which she makes her own version of the instrument with everyday household objects before the professional musician returns for a jam session on a song.

The series received a Canadian Screen Award nomination for Best Children's or Youth Non-Fiction Program or Series at the 9th Canadian Screen Awards in 2021.
