= Striking Balance =

Canadian television documentary series

Striking Balance is a Canadian television documentary series, which premiered in 2020 on TVOntario. Created by Yvonne Drebert and Zach Melnick and narrated by musician Jim Cuddy, the series profiles various protected areas across Canada, including but not limited to national or provincial parks, which have been designated as biosphere reserves by UNESCO.

The series was nominated for the Rob Stewart Award for best science or nature documentary at the 9th Canadian Screen Awards in 2021.
