= Science Max =

Canadian children's television series

- Also known as: Science Max
- Genre: children's
- Created by: Phil McCordic
- Written by: Phil McCordic
- Directed by: Ryan Marley, Chris Chilco
- Starring: Phil McCordic
- Composer: Trevor Ziebarth
- Country of origin: Canada
- Original language: English
- No. of seasons: 3
- No. of episodes: 39

Production
- Executive producer: Breakthrough Entertainment
- Producer: Phil McCordic
- Running time: 22 mins
- Production company: Breakthrough Entertainment

Original release
- Network: TVOntario, Da Vinci Kids, Channel NewsAsia (expert sabotage science)
- Release: 2015 – 2018

Science Max: Experiments at Large is a Canadian children's television series, which premiered on TVOntario's TVOKids and Da Vinci Kids programming block in 2015. Hosted by Phil McCordic, the series educates viewers about science through large-scale experiments to demonstrate scientific principles.

The series also features an interactive online component.

It is filmed at the Ontario Science Centre.

The series won three Canadian Screen Awards at the 5th Canadian Screen Awards in 2017 and the 6th Canadian Screen Awards in 2018, for Best Children's or Youth Non-Fiction Program and Best Cross-Platform Digital Project.

== Episodes ==
Science Max ran for three seasons and a total of 29 episodes.

No.	No. in season	Title	Written by	Original air date
1	1	"Newton's 3rd Law"	Phil McCordic	7 September 2015
Phil and the team attempt to scale up a laboratory balloon car into a full-sized vehicle capable of carrying a passenger, testing Newton's Third Law. The episode also features a demonstration of a Newton's Cradle using bowling balls and how the guinea pig got its name.
1	2	"Elasticity"	Phil McCordic	7 September 2015
Phil and the team attempt to scale up a popsicle stick catapult into a full-size catapult that hurls pumpkins. The episode also features a paddle wheel boat and a historical re-enactment of how catapults were used in medieval times.
