= Ruff-Ruff, Tweet and Dave =

Children's television series, 2015–2017

- Genre: Educational; Preschool
- Created by: Tony Collingwood
- Directed by: Tony Collingwood; Andrea Tran
- Voices of: UK Version: David Holt Joseph West Ella Pearl Marshall-Pinder Jonathan Millar; US Version: Forrest Harding Ethan Drake Davis Hannah Swain Austin Nash Chase
- Composer: Mark Dyson
- Countries of origin: United Kingdom; Singapore
- Original language: English
- No. of seasons: 2
- No. of episodes: 104

Production
- Executive producers: Kok Cheong Wong; Jackie Edwards; Tatiana Kober
- Producers: Helen Stroud; Gun Yoon Cheong
- Running time: 11 minutes
- Production companies: Collingwood & Co. Sparky Animation

Original release
- Network: CBeebies (United Kingdom); Sprout (United States)
- Release: February 14, 2015 – September 9, 2017

Ruff-Ruff, Tweet and Dave is an British-Singaporean interactive animated children's television series produced by Collingwood & Co. and Sparky Animation that premiered in the United Kingdom on CBeebies and in the United States on Sprout in 2015. Hulu acquired the streaming rights in 2016. Production ceased on new episodes when Universal Kids stopped developing original shows in 2019.

== Synopsis ==
In each episode, Ruff-Ruff, Tweet and Dave are called out by Hatty the Hamster to go on adventures with him. A few times in each episode, Hatty will ask a question. The three title characters will give their answers, but only one of them is correct. Hatty then asks the viewers which of the three gave the correct answer to his question.

== Characters ==
=== Main ===
- Hatty (voiced by David Holt in the UK, Forrest Harding in season 1 and Bryce Papenbrook in season 2 in the US) is a hamster and the show's host. He wears a bow tie, and a top hat that shapeshifts from one episode to another. He takes the title characters to certain places in his top-shaped aircraft called the "Spin-Again". His shapeshifting hat also contains cards with questions that he reads to them. He would act like a school teacher to them by providing some information during their adventures. It is unknown if he has a house, although he has a garden where he occasionally takes his three friends to.
- Ruff-Ruff (voiced by Joseph West in the UK and Ethan Drake Davis in the US) is a 5-year-old red puppy, and one of the three title characters. He lives in a red home (resembling a ball with his ears) which sits beside both Tweet's & Dave's homes, and is located on a mountain that extends above a lake. He also drives a red Rolly Pod. He even likes to dig holes which, at times, result in finding lost items.
- Tweet (voiced by Ella Pearl Marshall-Pinder in the UK and Hannah Swain in the US) is a 4-year-old yellow chick wearing pink glasses, and the shortest of the group. She lives in a yellow home that sits in between Ruff-Ruff's & Dave's homes. Her house resembles an egg, and drives a yellow Rolly Pod with a beak. She walks by moving her feet simultaneously rather than alternately.
- Dave (voiced by Jonathan Millar in the UK and Austin Nash Chase in the US) is a 6-year-old blue panda, and is the biggest of the title characters. He lives in a white home with blue ears that resembles him. His house is further on the right, being beside Tweet's home and is even further than Ruff-Ruff's home. He drives a big fat blue Rolly Pod. He is also the subject of Hatty's last question which the hamster asks at the end of each episode who will fall asleep first, & Dave is always the answer because he always falls asleep before Ruff-Ruff & Tweet do. There was one episode where Dave made a complete sweep by being the only one correct on every question Hatty asks. Unlike most pandas that eat bamboo, Dave seems to like eating bananas.

=== Other ===
- Mr. Squirrel is an orange/brown squirrel whom Ruff-Ruff likes to chase around. He would sometimes aid the main characters in their adventures. As with characters other than the main ones, he does not speak.
- Cindy Squirrel is the other squirrel in the show.
- Speedy/Sneezy Sheep are a pair of sheep with a black stripe on the wools near their necks. They occasionally take part in the main characters' games.
- Mrs. Duck is a green/brown duck who adores Tweet and swims around.
- The Cows are at the farm, but they do not speak.
- Farmer Fred is mentioned.
- Bobby is a spider monkey who speaks a gibberish language.
- Tara is another monkey and is Bobby's sister.
- Littlest Rabbit is part of the Rabbit family the three title characters help sometimes. He is sometimes seen with his plush toy which is a carrot with a face called a Cuddly Carrot.
- Mr. Rabbit is the father of the Rabbit family. He wins a carrot contest of which Hatty was a contestant.

== Production ==
In April 2013, during development on Collingwood & Co's preschool animated series Ruff-Ruff, Tweet and Dave American preschool television channel Sprout had joined the series as a co-producer and would broadcast it.

In November 2013, production for CBeebies' animated series Ruff-Ruff, Tweet & Dave had been started when the series alongside other 16 animated projects including CBeebies' then-upcoming state had received official certification from the British origanization BFI and the Creative Skillset. The series is produced by British studio Collingwood & Co., Singapore studio Sparky Animation and Canadian studio Bejuba! Entertainment for CBeebies. American studio SDI Media co-produced the US Version of the series.

== Episodes ==
=== Season 1 (2015-2016) ===
No. in season	Title
1	"A Fairytale Adventure"
2	"A Bouncy Adventure"
3	"A Hide-and-Seek Adventure"
4	"A Singing Adventure"
5	"A Mountain Adventure"
6	"A Beach Adventure"
7	"A Pirate Adventure"
8	"A Farmyard Adventure"
9	"A Racing Adventure"
10	"A Collecting Adventure"
11	"A Gardening Adventure"
12	"A Flying Adventure"
13	"A Dancing Adventure"
14	"A Kite Adventure"
15	"A Cowboy Adventure"
16	"A Birthday Party Adventure"
17	"A Building Adventure"
18	"A Puzzle Adventure"
19	"A Counting Adventure"
20	"An Opposite Adventure"
21	"A Veggie Adventure"
22	"A Happy Adventure"
23	"A Rainbow Adventure"
24	"An Exploring Adventure"
25	"An Obstacle Adventure"
26	"An Upside-Down Adventure"
27	"A Traveling Adventure"
28	"A Home Sweet Home Adventure"
29	"A Train Adventure"
30	"A Sailing Adventure"
31	"A Remembering Adventure"
32	"A Spot the Difference Adventure"
33	"A Squeaky Ball Adventure"
34	"A Mini Golf Adventure"
35	"A Music-Making Adventure"
36	"A Drawing Adventure"
37	"An Apple Tree Adventure"
38	"A Birdy Adventure"
39	"An Inventing Adventure"
40	"A Fix It Adventure"
41	"A Driving Adventure"
42	"A Signs Adventure"
43	"A Pattern Adventure"
44	"A Matching Adventure"
45	"A Bubble Adventure"
46	"A Starry Adventure"
47	"A Movement Adventure"
48	"A Playground Adventure"
49	"A Superpower Adventure"
50	"A Special Delivery Adventure"
51	"A Happy Hat Adventure"
52	"A Robot Adventure"

=== Season 2 (2016-2017) ===
No. in season	Title
1	"A Firefighter Adventure"
2	"A Bibble Bink Adventure"
3	"A Ruff-Ruff Adventure"
4	"A Song Making Adventure"
5	"A Game Show Adventure"
6	"A Wishing Adventure"
7	"A Noisy Adventure"
8	"A Moving Home Adventure"
9	"A Friends Adventure"
10	"A Princess Adventure"
11	"A Prize-Winning Adventure"
12	"A Honey Adventure"
13	"A Banana Adventure"
14	"A Delivery Crew Adventure"
15	"A Bug Adventure"
16	"A Butterfly Adventure"
17	"A Hiccup Adventure"
18	"A Bunny-Sitting Adventure"
19	"A Magic Show Adventure"
20	"A Bowling Adventure"
21	"A Cheerleading Adventure"
22	"A Playhouse Adventure"
23	"A Finding Adventure"
24	"A Tall Adventure"
25	"A Clean Up Adventure"
26	"A Harvest Adventure"
27	"An Animal Parade Adventure"
28	"A Rollypod Adventure"
29	"A Pairs Adventure"
30	"A Show Adventure"
31	"A Cake Adventure"
32	"A Learning Adventure"
33	"A Jungle Song Adventure"
34	"A Be Safe Adventure"
35	"A Photo Adventure"
36	"A Story Finding Adventure"
37	"A Pumpkin Adventure"
38	"A Swapping Adventure"
39	"A Super Tweet Adventure"
40	"A Ring and Sing Adventure"
41	"A Reporting Adventure"
42	"A Fruit Juice Adventure"
43	"A Finding the Way Adventure"
44	"A Big Party Adventure"
45	"A Hatty's Hat Adventure"
46	"A Vacation Adventure"
47	"A Hoe-Down Adventure"
48	"A Jungle Games Adventure"
49	"A Recycling Adventure"
50	"An Egg Hunt Adventure"
51	"A Police Adventure"
52	"A Fly High Adventure"

=== Special (2016) ===
No. in season	Title
1	"A Christmas Adventure"
