= All-Round Champion =

Canadian children's television series

- Genre: Sports
- Presented by: Perdita Felicien
- Country of origin: Canada
- Original language: English
- No. of seasons: 7
- No. of episodes: 77

Production
- Executive producers: Mark J.W. Bishop; Matthew Hornburg; Steve Sloan; Andra Johnson Duke; Donna Luke; Jeff Simpson; Erik Christensen; Kirsten Hurd; Marney Malabar
- Producers: Peredita Felicien; Meg Majewski
- Production companies: MarbleMedia (seasons 1–5); Blue Ant Studios (season 6–)

Original release
- Network: BYUtv (United States); TVOKids & Knowledge Kids (Canada)

All-Round Champion is a Canadian children's television series, which premiered in 2020. Hosted by Perdita Felicien, the series features several high-achieving teen athletes from both Canada and the United States, placing them in a competition scenario where they must train and compete in sports other than their own primary discipline, with the best-performing athlete crowned as the winner at the end of the season.

The series was produced by Marblemedia and based on the Norwegian series Best i mest. It was produced for TVOntario in Canada and BYUtv in the United States, and also later aired on Knowledge Network and PCCW Media.

The show's renewal for a second season was announced before the first season began airing. To date the show has aired 6 seasons consisting of 79 episodes.

== Format ==
All-Round Champion runs over the course of ten weeks; with the exception of season 6, which will run for eleven). Each week, one of the athletes gets to showcase and coach their sport to their fellow competitors, alongside a sport star whose job is to not only coach the athletes, but also to award the medals and the shoutouts at the end of the week.

Each week starts with the athletes on their bus learning about the week's sport via a recorded message from the host, Perdita Felicien, which would air on a TV inside the bus.

After the announcement, the athletes set off to a location where they partake in The Basics. The Basics is a day where the athletes do a fun activity which relates to the week's sport. In season 3, The Basics was also an opportunity for one of the athletes to earn The Advantage, which gave them a leg-up over the rest on Competition Day.

Following The Basics, came the two Training Days. On the first day of Training, the athlete whose sport is featured that week, gets to showcase their sport in a demonstration. The announcement of the sport star follows the demo, where they introduce themselves and show off their medals.

Over two days, athletes train in their chosen sport to develop and refine their skills for Competition Day.

On Competition Day, the athletes all compete either individually or as a team (depending on the sport) in the sport. This is where The Advantage comes into play, as the athlete in possession of it, gets an advantage in the competition, which could increase their chances of landing on The Podium.

At the end of the competition, would come The Podium, where the Shoutouts and The Medals are awarded. Shoutouts are individual awards worth ten points where the sport star acknowledges two athletes for their work ethic and improvement during the week.

The Medals are awards handed out to three (or more, depending on the sport) athletes who did the best in The Competition. Three medals are handed out: one bronze, one silver and one gold. The Medals also translate to points on The Leaderboard.

All the athletes who participated in the competition and did not receive a medal, nor a shoutout receive five points.

The Leaderboard keeps track of each athlete's progress in points throughout the competition. A visual of The Leaderboard airs at the end of The Podium.

The Medals
Medals	Point Value
Gold	25 points
Silver	20 points
Bronze	15 points

This format continues until after the final sport, where the athletes compete in the ARC-athlon.

In the ARC-athlon, all of the ten athletes compete in five different events to gain more points to their final point tally. These events (except the team events) still follow the point system of the medals, but also depending on how they placed in the event, they would also be awarded a certain number of points.

At the end of the ARC-athlon, would come The Final Podium, where Predita recognizes each athletes journey throughout the competition. Then she announces the All-Round Champion, which is the athlete with the most points on the leaderboard. The winner is awarded the All-Round Champion belt.

== Season 1 ==
=== Athletes ===
Athletes
Name	Sport
Brodie Drummond	Kayaking
Cayde Mckinstray	Skateboarding
Daniel Johnson	Wakeboarding
Faith Foley	Kart Racing
Fenella Murphy	Equestrian
Haven Ward	Golf
Jasmine Jaswal	Swimming
Marshall Gehrke	BMX
Michael Andriyuk	Diving
Sydney Stevens	Gymnastics

=== Episode Leaderboard ===
Athlete	Diving	Gymnastics	Equestrian	Golf	Skateboarding	Swimming	BMX	Wakeboarding	Kart Racing	Kayaking
Brodie Drummond	5	10	35	40	65	90	105	130	140	150
Sydney Stevens	25	25	40	45	80	90	100	105	113	128
Marshall Gehrke	15	40	45	50	70	75	75	80	105	125
Daniel Johnson	20	50	55	80	95	100	125	125	145	170
Cayde Mckinstray	5	20	25	30	40	45	65	85	100	105
Jasmine Jaswal	10	10	15	45	50	50	55	65	71	81
Michael Andriyuk	0	5	15	20	20	40	45	70	75	80
Haven Ward	5	10	35	35	40	65	70	75	92	97
Fenella Murphy	10	10	10	40	60	65	70	75	84	89
Faith Foley	0	5	15	20	35	40	50	55	65	70

=== Final Leaderboard (After ARC-athlon) ===
Final Leaderboard
Athletes	Points
Brodie Drummond	190
Sydney Stevens	188
Marshall Gehrke	185
Daniel Johnson	180
Cayde Mckinstray	162
Jasmine Jaswal	141
Michael Andriyuk	135
Haven Ward	125
Fenella Murphy	116
Faith Foley	101

== Reception ==
Kirsten Hurd, commissioning editor at Canadian public broadcaster TVOKids, called the series a "runaway hit."

== Accolades ==
The series has won two Canadian Screen Awards for Best Children's or Youth Non-Fiction Program or Series out of three nominations.

In 2023, the series received two Children's and Family Emmy Awards nominations for Outstanding Non-Fiction Program and Outstanding Casting.
