= My Home, My Life =

My Home, My Life! is a Canadian television documentary series for children, which premiered on TVOntario in 2020. The series features a number of children, from Canada presenting short video features on their home and family lives.

The series was created and produced by Lopii Productions, a Canadian production company led by twin sisters Rennata and Georgina Lopez A related series, My Stay-at-Home Diary, premiered in 2020 and featured children creating short video features about how they were coping with pandemic lockdowns.

The series was also carried in the United States by PBS.

My Stay-at-Home Diary received a Canadian Screen Award nomination for Best Children's or Youth Non-Fiction Program or Series at the 9th Canadian Screen Awards in 2021. At the 10th Canadian Screen Awards in 2022, My Home, My Life was nominated for Best Children's or Youth Non-Fiction Program or Series and Best Writing, Children's or Youth. It also won a Youth Media Alliance Award of Excellence in 2023 for Best Program Non Fiction 6-9.
