= Cooking for Kids with Luis =

- Genre: Children's television series
- Created by: Phillip Tanner
- Directed by: Phillip Tanner
- Starring: Luis Tanner
- Theme music composer: Sherylanne McLeod
- Country of origin: Australia
- Original language: English
- No. of seasons: 1
- No. of episodes: 21

Production
- Producer: Dina Panozzo
- Running time: 5 minutes
- Production companies: Total Perception; Nickelodeon Australia

Original release
- Network: Nick Jr. (Australia)
- Release: 25 October 2004 – 2005

Related
- Gardening for Kids with Madi

Cooking for Kids with Luis is an Australian short-form cooking show for preschoolers, co-produced by Total Perception Productions and Nickelodeon Australia. It premiered on Nick Jr. Australia in 2004. The show is hosted by 6-year-old Luis Tanner, a boy from Australia who became the Guinness World Record holder for the youngest TV host. Every short follows Luis as he prepares, cooks and shares some of his favourite dishes. He also shows where food comes from by gathering the ingredients.

In the United States, the show aired on Noggin. It premiered with a half-hour special on 26 September 2005. The special was made up of shorts themed around Latino recipes (like tortillas, empanadas, and Guatemalan cheesecake) to celebrate Hispanic Heritage Month. Afterward, all 20 of the 4-5 minute shorts aired in between shows on Noggin, as part of the Snack Time interstitial series. All of the recipes were posted on Noggin.com.

In 2006, a follow-up from the same creators premiered, called Gardening for Kids with Madi. Luis appeared in some of the episodes.

== Episodes ==
21 shorts were made, making up one season.

=== List ===
- Super Duper – Luis has breakfast of cereal and granola.
- Hamburger – Luis visits his cousins' house, where they make hamburgers.
- Polenta with Nonna – Luis flies to Italy, where he cooks polenta.
- Tortilla Frenzy – Luis fills tortillas for his classmates.
- Pizza – Luis makes homemade pizza and shares it.
- Custard – Luis makes instant custard for his dessert.
- Yum Cha – Luis goes to Chinatown to purchase ingredients for yum cha.
- Flying Food – Luis's kitchen needs cleaning.
- Fruit Kebabs – Luis visits his cousins in the tropics and serves them fruit kebabs.
- Hot Diggity Dogs – Luis makes hot dogs.
- Gingerbread Men – Luis runs "as fast as he can" to buy gingerbread.
- French Toast and Toad in a Hole – Luis tells viewers examples of healthy breakfasts.
- Fish – Luis' friend John takes him fishing for whiting.
- Pancakes – Luis flips pancakes.
- Best Ever Scrambled Eggs – Luis makes his favourite scrambled egg dish.
- Juice Bar – Luis makes his own fruit juice.
- Spaghetti Bolognese – Luis cooks pasta to go along with his spaghetti sauce.
- Empanadas – Luis makes stuffed bread.
- Guatemalan Cheesecake – Luis shows viewers how to make Guatemalan cheesecake.
- Chocolate Crackles – Luis mixes melted chocolate with cereal.
- Picnic – Luis prepares a picnic after being invited on a hot air balloon adventure.

== Broadcast ==
From 2004 until 2007, Cooking for Kids with Luis was seen six times a day on Nick Jr. Australia (at 3:00 AM, 6:30 AM, 11:00 AM, 2:30 PM, 7:00 PM, and 10:30 PM). Afterward, the show aired less frequently. It is also seen on a variety of networks worldwide, including Noggin in the United States and the Nick Jr. Channel in Canada, United Kingdom, Ireland, South Africa, Germany and France (most are dubbed). In Canada, Cooking for Kids with Luis was shown on TVOKids.

== Merchandise ==
In 2007, Pluto Press published a cookbook based on the show. It was written by Phillip Tanner, Luis' father and the producer of the show. The book included a DVD with ten episodes.

== Awards ==
Cooking for Kids with Luis won two ASTRA Awards in 2005: Most Outstanding Australian Production in both Kids and Short Form. Luis was also nominated as Favourite New Presenter.

At six years old (five during the filming of the first episode), the show's star Luis Tanner is currently the Guinness World Record holder as the youngest host of his own television program.
