= Knowledge Network =

Canadian TV channel based in British Columbia

- Logo used since 2012
- Country: Canada
- Broadcast area: British Columbia
- Headquarters: Burnaby, British Columbia

Programming
- Languages: English; Audio described
- Picture format: 1080i HDTV (downscaled to 480i for the SDTV feed)

Ownership
- Owner: Knowledge Network Corporation
- Parent: Government of British Columbia

History
- Launched: January 12, 1981; 45 years ago

Links
- Website: www.knowledge.ca

Knowledge Network, also branded as British Columbia's Knowledge Network and K:, is a Canadian publicly funded educational cable television network serving the province of British Columbia. It is owned by the Knowledge Network Corporation, a Crown corporation of the Government of British Columbia, and began broadcasting on January 12, 1981. Michelle van Beusekom is the CEO.

Knowledge Network's broadcast licence is for satellite-to-cable programming. The network is available on the Bell Satellite TV satellite service, on channel 268, on Shaw Direct channel 354, and on TELUS Optik TV channel 117 (HD) and 9117 (SD). It has also been broadcast over-the-air in remote locations throughout British Columbia, with these repeater sites being operated by local volunteers in the few areas of the province where cable television is not available. The network used the call sign CKNO, although the transmitters were assigned numeric callsigns with the prefix "CH" due to being low-powered.

Knowledge receives funding both from the British Columbia government and from private donations. The station provides programming through its broadcast channel, websites and apps. Knowledge Network also invests in documentaries and children's programs produced by independent filmmakers and helps to develop skills within the independent production community.

== Overview ==
Knowledge Network is British Columbia's public educational broadcaster and is required to be distributed on the basic cable tiers of all cable providers in British Columbia.

When Knowledge first signed on in 1981, its broadcast schedule originally ran from 9 a.m. to 11 p.m. In later years, it broadcast from 7 a.m. to midnight. until July 2007, when programming hours were expanded to 6 a.m.–1 a.m. In late 2007, Knowledge Network began changing its logo from the green tree to its new wordmark logo, and as of June 2008 the green tree logo has been removed. The channel is currently a 24-hour broadcaster.

The network obtains an average of 1.5 million viewers, or over one-third of British Columbians per week. Currently, within the province, the station holds the number one position on weekday mornings for kids age two to six. Also, it has experienced an increase in viewers age 29 to 49 for its prime time programs.

In its programming, Knowledge Network covers a range of topics including politics, history and culture, arts and music, health, parenting, and science. It has a children's block, Knowledge Kids, that features characters Luna, Chip and Inkie.

With funding from the provincial government and over 40,000 individual donors, Knowledge Network acquires and commissions over 750 hours of original programming per year.

In 2011, Knowledge Network acquired Shaw Media's stake in the children's television service BBC Kids, and converted it into a commercial-free service.

Knowledge Network launched an HD feed on September 25, 2013. It became available to provincial customers of Shaw Cable and Shaw Direct on October 8, 2013.

== Controversy ==
In February 2022, an internal audit of the Knowledge Network Corporation, conducted by the Castlemain Group, was released to the public. The audit revealed that under former president and CEO Rudy Buttignol's leadership, 98.3% of the Knowledge Network's $2.054 million pre-licence funding was awarded to production companies with "non-diverse" owners. The remaining 1.7% ($34,000) had been awarded to production companies owned by people of colour. Meanwhile, Indigenous filmmakers have received none of that funding.

The Racial Equity Screen Office, the Vancouver Asian Film Festival and the Documentary Organization of Canada had lobbied the broadcaster for more than a year to conduct the audit and release the results.

In response, Melanie Mark, British Columbia's minister of Culture, appointed three new members to the Network's board. In a statement she directed Buttignol and the board to make improvements. Buttignol meanwhile claimed he had "major reservations" with the audit.

Members of the IBPOC film community claimed that Buttignol's response "contributed to an increased distrust and lack of confidence from filmmakers of colour and other concerned British Columbians". A petition on Change.org was started calling for his replacement.

On June 17, 2022, the Knowledge Network's board released a statement that Buttignol's contract had been terminated.

== Logos ==
Logo used from 2007 to 2008

Alternate logo, now used as the on-air bug. Was the main logo from 2008 to 2010.

Logo used from 2010 to 2012

British Columbia's Knowledge Network 2012. Current logo.

== See also ==
- List of programs broadcast by Knowledge Network
- PBS Appalachia Virginia, an educational broadcaster which uses a similar arrangement
- Citytv Saskatchewan, a partial educational broadcaster which uses a similar arrangement
