= 18th Gemini Awards =

2003 awards for Canadian television

- Date: October 20, 2003
- Venue: John Bassett Theatre, Toronto
- Hosted by: Seán Cullen

Television/radio coverage
- Network: CBC Television

The Academy of Canadian Cinema & Television's 18th Gemini Awards were held on October 20, 2003, to honour achievements in Canadian television. The awards show, which was hosted by Seán Cullen, took place at the John Bassett Theatre and was broadcast on CBC Television.

== Best Dramatic Series ==
- The Eleventh Hour – Alliance Atlantis Communications. Producers: Ilana Frank, Semi Chellas, Anne Marie La Traverse, Brian Dennis
- Blue Murder – Barna-Alper Productions, Canwest, North Bend Films. Producers: Laszlo Barna, Steve Lucas, Norman Denver
- Cold Squad – Keatley MacLeod Productions, Atlantis Films. Producers: Peter Mitchell, Jon Pilatzke, Gigi Boyd, Steve Ord, Matt MacLeod, Julia Keatley, Gary Harvey
- Da Vinci’s Inquest – Haddock Entertainment, Barna-Alper Productions, Alliance Atlantis Productions, Canadian Broadcasting Corporation. Producers: Chris Haddock, Laszlo Barna, Lynn Barr, Arvi Liimatainen
- The Atwood Stories – Shaftesbury Films. Producers: Kim Todd, Francine Zuckerman, Christina Jennings, Lori Spring, Laura Harbin, Scott Garvie

== Best Dramatic Mini-Series or TV Movie ==
- 100 Days in the Jungle – ImagiNation Film and Television Productions, Sextant Entertainment Group. Producers: Nicolette Saina, Sean O’Byrne, Matthew O’Connor, Tom Rowe, Mary Anne Waterhouse
- The Many Lives of Albert Walker – Alliance Atlantis Communications, BBC, CTV Television Network, Isle of Man Film, Little Bird Productions. Producers: Anne Marie La Traverse, Jonathan Cavendish, Sophie Gardiner, Mike Dormer
- Chasing Cain: Face – Indian Grove Productions, Muse Entertainment, Salter Street Films. Producers: Bernard Zukerman, Michael Prupas
- The Interrogation of Michael Crowe – Incendo Productions, JB Media, Andrea Baynes Productions, Hearst Entertainment. Producer: Terry Gould
- The Many Trials of One Jane Doe – Original Pictures, Indian Grove Productions, Studio Eight Productions, Muse Entertainment, Canadian Broadcasting Corporation. Producers: Bernard Zukerman, Michael Prupas, Jamie Brown, Kim Todd

== Best Short Dramatic Program ==
- When I Was Seven – Girls On Film Productions. Producer: Andrea Bastin
- Interviews with My Next Girlfriend – Fighting Fish Pictures. Producers: Maria Popoff, Cassandra Nicolaou
- Degrassi: The Next Generation – White Wedding – Bell Media, Epitome Pictures. Producers: Stephen Stohn, Linda Schuyler

== Best Comedy Program or Series ==
- This Hour Has 22 Minutes – Salter Street Films, Canadian Broadcasting Corporation. Producers: Jenipher Ritchie, Mark Farrell, Susan MacDonald, Jack Kellum, Geoff D'Eon, Michael Donovan
- Lord Have Mercy! – Leda Serene Films. Producers: Claire Prieto, Frances-Anne Solomon, Vance Chapman
- Puppets Who Kill – Eggplant Picture & Sound. Producers: John Pattison, Shawn Thompson, John Leitch, Rob Mills
- The Gavin Crawford Show – Idle Mind Productions, Shaftesbury Films. Producers: Kyle Tingley, Ron Murphy, Virginia Rankin
- Trailer Park Boys – Showcase, Topsail Entertainment. Producers: Mike Clattenburg, Michael A Volpe, Barrie Dunn

== Best Music, Variety Program or Series ==
- Juno Awards of 2003 – Canadian Academy of Recording Arts and Sciences, CTV Television Network. Producers: Louise Wood, Barbara Bowlby, John Brunton, Stephen Stohn
- East Coast Music Awards – East Coast Music Association, Canadian Broadcasting Corporation Halifax. Producers: Jac Gautreau, Michael Lewis, Geoff D'Eon
- Amanda Marshall – Everybody's Got a Story – Copy Zero. Producers: Campbell Webster, Matt Zimbel
- Live At The Rehearsal Hall – Bravo!. Producers: John Gunn, Robert Benson
- Juno Songwriter's Circle – Canadian Academy of Recording Arts and Sciences, Canadian Broadcasting Corporation. Producers: Moya Walsh, Brookes Diamond, Jack Kellum

== Best Performing Arts Program or Series, or Arts Documentary Program or Series ==
- The True Meaning of Pictures: Shelby Lee Adams' Appalachia – TVOntario. Producers: Rudy Buttignol, Jennifer Baichwal, Nicholas de Pencier
- Bollywood Bound – National Film Board of Canada. Producer: Karen King
- Joseph Giunta: A Silent Triumph – Films Piché-Ferrari, National Film Board of Canada. Producer: Pepita Ferrari
- Le Mozart noir – Media Headquarters. Producers: Shari Cohen, Robert Cohen, Robin Neinstein
- Tucked Into Bedlam – Canadian Broadcasting Corporation. Producers: Natasha Ryan, Geoff Le Boutillier, Susan Levine

== Best Talk Series ==
- Studio 2 – TVOntario. Producers: Doug Grant, Jane Jankovic
- Imprint – TVOntario. Producer: Doug Grant
- Medical Hotseat – Medical Hotseat Productions. Producer: Hedy Korbee
- Open Mike with Mike Bullard – The Comedy Network. Producers: Mark McInnis, Barbara Bowlby, John Brunton
- Hot Type – CBC Newsworld. Producers: Alice Hopton, Dana Glassman, Janet Thomson

== Best Reality Program or Series ==
- Cirque du Soleil: Fire Within – Ici ARTV, Bravo!, Canadian Television Fund, Créations Musca, Galafilm. Producers: Marie Cote, Vincent Gagné, Arnie Gelbart
- eLove – Cineflix. Producers: Cesca Eaton, Andre Barro
- Matchmaker – Tricon Films & Television. Producer: Andrea Gorfolova
- Popstars: The One – Lone Eagle Entertainment. Producers: Maria Pimentel, Michael Geddes

== Donald Brittain Award for Best Social/Political Documentary Program ==
- Return To Kandahar – Icebreaker Films, Canadian Broadcast Corporation. Producers: David M. Ostriker, Nelofer Pazira, Paul Jay
- The View from Here – Chinese Daughters – TVOntario). Producers: Rudy Buttignol, Dorlene Lin
- Salvation – National Film Board of Canada. Producer: Kent Martin
- Seeing Is Believing: Handicams, Human Rights and the News – Necessary Illusions. Producers: Catherine Olsen, Katerina Cizek, Peter Wintonick, Francis Miquet
- The Tree That Remembers – National Film Board of Canada. Producer: Sally Bochner

== Best Documentary Series ==
- Rough Cuts – CBC Newsworld. Producer: Andrew Johnson
- A Question of Honour – Breakout Educational Network. Producers: Kitson Vincent, Robert Roy
- The Passionate Eye – Canadian Broadcast Corporation. Producer: Catherine Olsen
- The Undefended Border – White Pine Pictures. Producers: Lindalee Tracey, Peter Raymont
- The View from Here – TVOntario). Producer: Rudy Buttignol

== Best History Documentary Program ==
- Undying Love – Canadian Independent Film and Video Fund, Canadian Television Fund, CTV Television Network, Les Productions La Fête, Société de développement des entreprises culturelles, VisionTV. Producer: Ina Fichman
- Guinea Pig Club – Infinity Films. Producers: Pat O’Brien, Cynthia Chapman, Dan Carriere, Shel Piercy
- The Boys of Buchenwald – Paperny Films. Producer: David Paperny
- Chiefs – The Trial of Poundmaker – Galafilm, National Film Board of Canada. Producers: Arnie Gelbart, Richard Elson

== Best Biography Documentary Program ==
- Claude Jutra: An Unfinished Story – Producers: André Théberge, Anne Frank, Yves Bisaillon, Nicole Lamothe
- Cecil's Journey – National Film Board of Canada. Producers: Peter d'Entremont, Kent Martin
- Life and Times – Destiny: The Life and Times of Paul Anka – Melbar Entertainment Group, Canadian Broadcasting Corporation. Producers: Robin Benger, Christopher Sumpton
- The Canadians: Biographies of a Nation – CRB Foundation, History Television. Producer: Patricia Phillips
- Life and Times – Destiny: The Life and Times of Pope John Paul II – Canadian Broadcasting Corporation. Producer: Terence McKenna

== Best Science, Technology, Nature, Environment or Adventure Documentary Program ==
- The Nature of Things – The Investigation of Swissair 111 – Canadian Broadcasting Corporation. Producers: Michael Allder, Kurt Schaad, Howard Green
- The View from Here – Life's a Twitch – National Film Board of Canada. Producers: Rudy Buttignol, Sally Blake, Tina Hahn
- The Baby Human – Oh Baby! To Walk – Ellis Entertainment. Producers: Kip Spidell, Stephen Ellis
- The Nature of Things – Up Close and Toxic – Canadian Broadcasting Corporation. Producers: Michael Allder, Caroline Underwood
- The Surgeons – Dr. Rao – Frantic Films. Producers: Rachel Low, Tim O’Brien, Daniela Battistella

== Best News Information Series ==
- CBC News: Disclosure – Canadian Broadcasting Corporation. Producers: F.M. Morrison, Susan Teskey, Cecil Rosner
- CBC News: Untold Stories – Jonathan Whitten, Lynn Burgess, Cynthia Kinch
- Venture – Canadian Broadcasting Corporation. Producers: Alan Habbick, Sophia Hadzipetros, Caroline Harvey
- Marketplace – Canadian Broadcasting Corporation. Producers: Tassie Notar, Leslie Peck
- MediaTelevision – Citytv. Producers: Marcia Martin, David Giddens
- W5 – CTV Television Network. Producers: Malcolm Fox, Anton Koschany, Robert Osborne

== Best News Magazine Segment ==
- CBC News: Sunday – Searching For Sarah – Canadian Broadcasting Corporation. Producers: Frédéric Zalac, Georges Laszuk, Denis Grenier, Martin Cadotte, Kat Kosiancic
- 21c – CTV Television Network. Producers: Derek Miller, Dominic Patten, Andrew Yates
- CBC News: Disclosure – Canadian Broadcasting Corporation. Producers: Lesley Cameron, Harvey Cashore, Kathleen Coughlin
- The National/CBC News – Canadian Broadcasting Corporation. Producers: Peter Zin, Loretta Hicks, Joan Leishman, Debi Goodwin, Robert Krbavac
- the fifth estate – Canadian Broadcasting Corporation. Producers: Neil Docherty, Linden MacIntyre, Erin Paul, Andrew Culbert, Oleh Rumak

== Best Newscast ==
- The National/CBC News – Canadian Broadcasting Corporation. Producers: Bob Waller, Fred Parker, Mark Harrison, Lynn Kelly, Jonathan Whitten
- CTV National News – CTV Television Network. Producers: Wendy Freeman, Margaret Spina, David Hughes, Blair Harley
- Global National – Global News. Producers: George Browne, Doriana Temolo, Kevin Newman

== Best News Special Event Coverage ==
- CBC News: Attack on Iraq – Canadian Broadcasting Corporation. Producers: Nancy Kelly, Mark Bulgutch, Fred Parker
- CBC News: Remembering September 11 – Canadian Broadcasting Corporation. Producers: Mark Bulgutch, Fred Parker
- CTV News – Space Shuttle Columbia Disaster – CTV Television Network. Producers: Joanne MacDonald, Devan Kraushur
- CTV News – Target Iraq – CTV Television Network. Producers: Joanne MacDonald, Tom Haberstroh
- Global National with Kevin Newman: September 11 – Global News. Producers: George Browne, Doriana Temolo, Kevin Newman

== Best Lifestyle or General Interest Series ==
- Taking It Off – Anaid Productions. Producer: Margaret Mardirossian
- The Great Canadian Food Show – Canadian Broadcasting Corporation. Producers: Chris Knight, Christine Overvelde
- The Surgeons – Frantic Films. Producers: Rachel Low, Tim O’Brien, Daniela Battistella
- BookTelevision – The Programme – Bell Media. Producer: Pauline Rentzelos
- Debbie Travis' Facelift – Whalley-Abbey Media Holdings. Producers: Debbie Travis, Hans Rosenstein

== Best Lifestyle/Practical Information Segment ==
- On the Road Again – Canadian Broadcasting Corporation. Producers: Roger Lefebvre, Louisa Battistelli, Aldo Columpsi, Malcolm Hamilton
- CBC News: Country Canada – Canadian Broadcasting Corporation. Producer: Jim MacQuarrie
- It's a Living – Rally Car Driver – Canadian Broadcasting Corporation Manitoba, Life Network. Producers: James Loewen, Noah Erenberg
- POV Sports – Hat Dance – Canadian Broadcasting Corporation. Producer: Mitch Burman
- SexTV – Khatoeys, Real Boys (Michelle Melles) – CHUM Television. Producer: Pedro Orrego

== Best Practical Information Series ==
- The Surreal Gourmet – Salad Daze Productions. Producers: Lon J. Hall, Dale Burshtein
- Loving Spoonfuls – W Network. Producers: David Gale, Allan Novak
- Savoir Faire Specials – Primevista Television. Producer: Michael Prini
- Debbie Travis' Painted House – Whalley-Abbey Media Holdings. Producers: Debbie Travis, Hans Rosenstein
- Holmes on Homes – General Purpose Entertainment. Producer: Scott Clark McNeil

== Best Animated Program or Series ==
- Doodlez – Cellar Door Productions. Producer: Gretha Rose
- Henry's World – Cuppa Coffee Studios, Alliance Atlantis Communications, TV-Loonland AG. Producers: Alan Gregg, Adam Shaheen, Suzanne French
- Olliver's Adventures – Collideascope, Decode Entertainment. Producers: Beth Stevenson, Allison Outhit, Michael-Andreas Kuttner, Steven J.P. Comeau
- Pig City – CinéGroupe, Red Rover Studios, AnimaKids Productions. Producer: Jacques Pettigrew
- The Christmas Orange – Bardel Entertainment. Producers: Cathy Schoch, Delna Bhesania, Barry Ward

== Best Pre-School Program or Series ==
- The Toy Castle – Sound Venture Productions. Producers: Katherine Jeans, Neil Bregman
- Simon in the Land of Chalk Drawings – Cinar, Shanghai Animation Film Studio. Producers: Cassandra Schafhausen, Peter Moss, Lesley Taylor
- The Save-Ums! – C.O.R.E., Decode Entertainment. Producers: Kym Hyde, Neil Court, Steve Denure, Beth Stevenson

== Best Children’s or Youth Fiction Program or Series ==
- Degrassi: The Next Generation – Bell Media, Epitome Pictures. Producers: Stephen Stohn, Linda Schuyler
- Fast Food High – Accent Entertainment, CCI Entertainment, Catalyst Entertainment, CTV Television Network. Producers: Nancy Chapelle, Susan Cavan, Paul Brown
- Guinevere Jones – Crawford Productions, Ibis Entertainment, Original Pictures. Producers: Kim Todd, Elizabeth Stewart
- Moville Mysteries – Nelvana, Suzhou Hong Ying Cartoon Co. Ltd. Producers: Scott Dyer, Michelle Melanson, Guy Vasilovich, Patricia R. Burns, Mimbi Eloriaga, Wendy Errington, Michael Hirsh, Jocelyn Hamilton
- The Dinosaur Hunter – Independent Moving Productions. Producer: Gail Tilson

== Best Children's or Youth Non-Fiction Program or Series ==
- Street Cents – Canadian Broadcasting Corporation. Producers: Barbara Kennedy, Wendy Purves
- A MuchMusic Special: Afghanistan – MuchMusic. Producer: Paul Templeman
- Mystery Hunters – Apartment 11 Productions. Producer: Jonathan Finkelstein
- SmartAsk – CBC Television. Producers: Luciano Casimiri, Ralph Benmergui, Greg Loewen
- VOX – TVOntario. Producer: Maria Farano
- 21c – CTV Television Network. Producers: Malcolm Fox, Nancy Franklin

== Best Sports Program or Series ==
- Dave Bidini: The Hockey Nomad – Mercury Films. Producers: Mike Downie, Nicholas de Pencier
- CFL on CBC: Wendy's Friday Night Football on TSN – CBC Sports, TSN. Producers: David Stiff, Paul McLean
- From Highway to Hard Court: Carl English's Quest for the NBA – CBC Sports. Producers: Mike Brannagan, Paul Harrington, Simon Dingley
- Hockey Night in Canada, Hockey Day in Canada – CBC Sports. Producers: Joel Darling, Chris Irwin
- NHL on TSN – Pre-Game – TSN. Producers: David Stiff, Rick Briggs-Jude

== Best Live Sporting Event ==
- 2003 World Junior Ice Hockey Championships, Gold Medal – TSN. Producers: Jon Hynes, Rick Briggs-Jude
- 2002 CN International Equestrian Hat at Spruce Meadows – CBC Sports. Producers: Mike Brannagan, Donna Warner
- CFL on CBC: 90th Grey Cup Championship – CBC Sports. Producers: Mike Brannagan, Trevor Pilling
- Hockey Night in Canada, Montreal at Toronto – CBC Sports. Producers: Joel Darling, Sherali Najak

== Best Interactive ==
- Degrassi: The Next Generation (Bell Media, Epitome Pictures). Producers: Stephen Stohn, Linda Schuyler, Roma Khanna, Raja Khanna
- Olliver's Adventures – Collideascope, Decode Entertainment. Producers: Michael-Andreas Kuttner, Steven J.P. Comeau
- Time Trackers – TVOntario. Producers: Pat Ellingson, Jennifer Burkitt, Marney Malabar, Phil McCordic, Jarrett Sherman, Jeremy Rodgers, Andrew Ebert
- Wumpa's World – Cité-Amérique, CCTV. Producers: Judith Beauregard, Sébastien Cliché, Jacques Durand, Jean-Claude Amyot, Neil Smolar
- ZeD – Canadian Broadcasting Corporation. Producers: Sung Hong, Jennifer Ouano, Luyen Dao, Christopher Hamersley, Renat Touichev, Weston Triemstra, Ian Wojtowicz, Ivar Vasara

== Best Direction in a Dramatic Program or Mini-Series ==
- Jerry Ciccoritti – The Many Trials of One Jane Doe (Original Pictures/Indian Grove Productions/Studio Eight Productions/Muse Entertainment/CBC)
- Sturla Gunnarsson – 100 Days in the Jungle (ImagiNation Film and Television/Sextant Entertainment)
- Don McBrearty – The Interrogation of Michael Crowe (Incendo Productions/JB Media/Andrea Baynes Productions/Hearst Entertainment)
- Michel Poulette – Agent of Influence (Alberta Filmworks/Galafilm/Alliance Atlantis/CTV)
- Rodney Gibbons – Silent Night (Fast Carrier Pictures/Hallmark Channel/Muse Entertainment)

== Best Direction in a Dramatic Series ==
- Helen Shaver – Just Cause – Death’s Details (Paxson Entertainment/W Network/Mind's Eye Entertainment)
- David Wellington – The Eleventh Hour (Alliance Atlantis)
- Kelly Makin – The Eleventh Hour (Alliance Atlantis)
- Stephen Reynolds – The Eleventh Hour – The Source (Alliance Atlantis)
- Holly Dale – Bliss – Voice (Galafilm/Back Alley Film Productions)

== Best Direction in an Information Program or Series ==
- Catherine Legge – CBC News: Disclosure (CBC)
- Terence McKenna, Josh Zabot – The Passionate Eye – The Recruiters (CBC)
- Howard Green – The Nature of Things – The Investigation of Swissair 111 (CBC)
- Anne Hainsworth – W5 (CTV)
- Leora Eisen – the fifth estate (CBC)

== Best Direction in a Documentary Program ==
- Paule Baillargeon – Claude Jutra: An Unfinished Story
- Audrey Mehler – The Boys of Buchenwald (Paperny Films)
- Mike Downie – Dave Bidini: The Hockey Nomad (Mercury Films)
- Jennifer Baichwal – The True Meaning of Pictures: Shelby Lee Adams' Appalachia (TVOntario)
- Robin Benger – First Person Shooter (Cogent/Benger Productions/CTV)

== Best Direction in a Documentary Series ==
- Lewis Cohen – Cirque du Soleil: Fire Within (Ici ARTV/Bravo!/Canadian Television Fund/Créations Musca/Galafilm)
- Dennis Murphy – A Question of Honour (Breakout Educational Network)
- Peter Raymont – The Undefended Border (White Pine Pictures)
- Justine Pimlott, Maya Gallus – Punch Like A Girl (Red Queen Productions)

== Best Direction in a Comedy Program or Series ==
- Henry Sarwer-Foner – This Hour Has 22 Minutes (Salter Street Films/CBC)
- Shawn Alex Thompson – Puppets Who Kill (Eggplant Picture & Sound)
- John Greyson – Made in Canada (Salter Street Films/Island Edge)
- Henry Sarwer-Foner – Made in Canada (Salter Street Films/Island Edge)
- Michael Kennedy – Made in Canada (Salter Street Films/Island Edge)

== Best Direction in a Variety Program or Series ==
- Henry Sarwer-Foner – This Hour Has 22 Minutes: New Year's Eve Special (Salter Street Films/CBC)
- René Dowhaniuk – 17th Gemini Awards (Academy of Canadian Cinema & Television/CBC Television)
- Shelagh O'Brien – East Coast Music Awards (East Coast Music Association/CBC Halifax)
- John Keffer – 2002 MuchMusic Video Awards (MuchMusic)
- Allan Novak – The Joke's on Us: 50 Years of CBC Satire (CBC)

== Best Direction in a Performing Arts Program or Series ==
- Larry Weinstein – Stormy Weather: The Music of Harold Arlen (BBC/CBC/Canadian Television Fund/Rhombus Media/TV Australia/Trio/Telefilm Canada)
- Pierre Séguin – Cirque Orchestra (Cirque Éloize)
- Raymond Saint-Jean – Le Mozart noir (Media Headquarters)
- Laura Taler – Perpetual Motion
- Moze Mossanen – Year of the Lion (Mossanen Productions)

== Best Direction in a Lifestyle/Practical Information Program or Series ==
- Barb Margetts – Animal Magnetism (Big Coat Productions)
- Catherine Pilon – Debbie Travis' Facelift ((Whalley-Abbey Media Holdings)
- Michael MacDonald – The Food Hunter (Ocean Entertainment)
- John Dolin – Animal Magnetism – The Making of a New York Cowboy (Big Coat Productions)
- Trevor Grant – Cook Like a Chef (Food Network (Canada))

== Best Direction in a Children's or Youth Program or Series ==
- Bruce McDonald – Degrassi: The Next Generation (Bell Media/Epitome Pictures)
- Jessica Bradford – When I Was Seven (Girls On Film Productions)
- Stefan Scaini – Strange Days at Blake Holsey High (Fireworks Entertainment)
- Anthony Atkins – Edgemont (CBC/Omnifilm Entertainment)
- Grant Harvey – Mentors (Mind's Eye Entertainment/Anaid Productions)

== Best Direction in a Live Sporting Event ==
- Andy Bouyoukos – Curling on TSN: The 2002 Continental Cup of Curling, Women's and Men's (TSN)
- Ron Forsythe – CFL on CBC: 90th Grey Cup Championship (CBC Sports)
- Troy Clara – 2002 FIFA U-19 Women's World Championship Final (CBC Sports)

== Best Writing in a Dramatic Program or Mini-Series ==
- Karen Walton – The Many Trials of One Jane Doe (Original Pictures/Indian Grove Productions/Studio Eight Productions/Muse Entertainment/CBC)
- Andrew Rai Berzins – Chasing Cain: Face (Indian Grove Productions/Muse Entertainment/Salter Street Films)
- Riley Adams, Ian Adams – Agent of Influence (Alberta Filmworks/Galafilm/Alliance Atlantis/CTV)
- Andrew Wreggitt, Peter Lauterman – Another Country (Alberta Filmworks)
- Ken Finkleman – Escape from the Newsroom (100% Film and Television/CBC/Showcase/Telefilm Canada)
- Dennis Foon, Kyle Yoneda – Scar Tissue (Shaftesbury Films)

== Best Writing in a Dramatic Series ==
- Frank Borg, Alan Di Fiore, Chris Haddock – Da Vinci’s Inquest – Ass Covering Day (Haddock Entertainment/Barna-Alper Productions/Alliance Atlantis/CBC)
- Alan Di Fiore, Chris Haddock – Da Vinci’s Inquest – You Got Monkey Chatter (Haddock Entertainment/Barna-Alper Productions/Alliance Atlantis/CBC)
- Peter Wellington – The Eleventh Hour – Don’t Have A Cow (Alliance Atlantis)
- Alex Pugsley, Sean Reycraft – The Eleventh Hour – Shelter (Alliance Atlantis)
- Swith Bell, Peter Wellington, Semi Chellas – The Eleventh Hour – Not Without My Reefer (Alliance Atlantis)

== Best Writing in a Comedy or Variety Program or Series ==
- John Pattison – Puppets Who Kill – The Payback (Eggplant Picture & Sound)
- Bob Martin – Made in Canada (Salter Street Films/Island Edge)
- Alex Ganetakos – Made in Canada (Salter Street Films/Island Edge)
- Jeremy Diamond – Odd Job Jack (Smiley Guy Studios)

== Best Writing in an Information Program or Series ==
- R. H. Thomson – CBC News: Sunday (CBC)
- Carol Off – The National/CBC News (CBC)
- Mark Kelley CBC News: Disclosure (CBC)
- Joe Schlesinger – Foreign Assignment (CBC Newsworld)
- Anna Maria Tremonti – the fifth estate (Canadian Broadcasting Corporation)

== Best Writing in a Documentary Program or Series ==
- Jefferson Lewis – Claude Jutra: An Unfinished Story
- Shelley Saywell – A Child's Century of War (Bishari Films)
- Larry Bambrick, Laura James – Catching a Killer: The Mystery of Sable Island (Exploration Production)
- Rob Buckman – The Origin of Feces
- Ted Remerowski – Security Threat (Paradigm Pictures)

== Best Writing in a Children's or Youth's Program or Series ==
- Peter Lauterman – The Zack Files – Zackeo & Juliet (Decode Entertainment)
- Craig Cornell, Aaron Martin – Degrassi: The Next Generation – Careless Whisper (Bell Media/Epitome Pictures)
- Jackie May, Tassie Cameron – Fast Food High (Accent Entertainment/CCI Entertainment/Catalyst Entertainment/CTV)
- Conni Massing – Mentors (Mind's Eye Entertainment/Anaid Productions)
- Richard Elliott, Simon Racioppa – Moville Mysteries – Big Toe, Big Evil (Nelvana/Suzhou Hong Ying Cartoon Co. Ltd)

== Best Performance by an Actor in a Leading Role in a Dramatic Program or Mini-Series ==
- Michael Riley – The Interrogation of Michael Crowe (Incendo Productions/JB Media/Andrea Baynes Productions/Hearst Entertainment)
- Alan Scarfe – The Many Lives of Albert Walker (Alliance Atlantis/BBC/CTV/Isle of Man Film/Little Bird Productions)
- Michael Hogan – Betrayed (Mind's Eye Entertainment/Barna-Alper Productions)
- Peter Outerbridge – Chasing Cain: Face (Indian Grove Productions/Muse Entertainment/Salter Street Films)
- Lee Williams – No Night Is Too Long (Alliance Atlantis/BBC/Studios Victoria)

== Best Performance by an Actress in a Leading Role in a Dramatic Program or Mini-Series ==
- Wendy Crewson – The Many Trials of One Jane Doe (Original Pictures/Indian Grove Productions/Studio Eight Productions/Muse Entertainment/CBC)
- Sarah Manninen – The Many Lives of Albert Walker (Alliance Atlantis/BBC/CTV/Isle of Man Film/Little Bird Productions)
- Alberta Watson – Chasing Cain: Face (Indian Grove Productions/Muse Entertainment/Salter Street Films)
- Ally Sheedy – The Interrogation of Michael Crowe (Incendo Productions/JB Media/Andrea Baynes Productions/Hearst Entertainment)
- Marina Orsini – Agent of Influence (Alberta Filmworks/Galafilm/Alliance Atlantis/CTV)
- Roberta Maxwell – Scar Tissue (Shaftesbury Films)

== Best Performance by an Actor in a Continuing Leading Dramatic Role ==
- Jeff Seymour – The Eleventh Hour (Alliance Atlantis)
- Jeremy Ratchford – Blue Murder (Barna-Alper Productions/Canwest/North Bend Films)
- Matthew Bennett – Cold Squad – True Believers (Keatley MacLeod Productions/Atlantis Films)
- Nicholas Campbell – Da Vinci’s Inquest (Haddock Entertainment/Barna-Alper Productions/Alliance Atlantis/CBC)
- Michael Ironside – The Last Chapter II: The War Continues (Ciné Télé Action)

== Best Performance by an Actress in a Continuing Leading Dramatic Role ==
- Marina Orsini – The Last Chapter II: The War Continues (Ciné Télé Action)
- Tamara Hickey – Blue Murder (Barna-Alper Productions/Canwest/North Bend Films)
- Julie Stewart – Cold Squad (Keatley MacLeod Productions/Atlantis Films)
- Mimi Kuzyk – Blue Murder (Barna-Alper Productions/Canwest/North Bend Films)
- Waneta Storms – The Eleventh Hour (Alliance Atlantis)

== Best Performance by an Actor in a Guest Role Dramatic Series ==
- Winston Rekert – Blue Murder (Barna-Alper Productions/Canwest/North Bend Films)
- Tom Heaton – Da Vinci’s Inquest (Haddock Entertainment/Barna-Alper Productions/Alliance Atlantis/CBC)
- Stephen E. Miller – Da Vinci’s Inquest (Haddock Entertainment/Barna-Alper Productions/Alliance Atlantis/CBC)
- Laurie Brunetti – Da Vinci’s Inquest (Haddock Entertainment/Barna-Alper Productions/Alliance Atlantis/CBC)
- Michael Moriarty – Just Cause – Death’s Details (Paxson Entertainment/W Network/Mind's Eye Entertainment)
- Robert A. Silverman – The Eleventh Hour (Alliance Atlantis)

== Best Performance by an Actress in a Guest Role Dramatic Series ==
- Kate Trotter – Blue Murder (Barna-Alper Productions/Canwest/North Bend Films)
- Lauren Piech – Blue Murder (Barna-Alper Productions/Canwest/North Bend Films)
- Brigitte Gall – Blue Murder (Barna-Alper Productions/Canwest/North Bend Films)
- Rebecca Jenkins – The Atwood Stories (Shaftesbury Films)
- Michèle-Barbara Pelletier – The Atwood Stories (Shaftesbury Films)
- Kirsten Kieferle – The Eleventh Hour (Alliance Atlantis)

== Best Performance by an Actor in a Featured Supporting Role in a Dramatic Series ==
- Peter MacNeill – The Eleventh Hour (Alliance Atlantis)
- Jason Schombing – Just Cause (Paxson Entertainment/W Network/Mind's Eye Entertainment)
- Matt Gordon – The Eleventh Hour (Alliance Atlantis)
- Dan Bigras – The Last Chapter II: The War Continues (Ciné Télé Action)
- Stuart Margolin – Tom Stone (Seven24 Films/Alberta Filmworks/CBC)
- Brian Herring – Doc (Paxson Entertainment/Pebblehut Productions)

== Best Performance by an Actress in a Featured Supporting Role in a Dramatic Series ==
- Jennie Raymond – Blue Murder (Barna-Alper Productions/Canwest/North Bend Films)
- Stacy Grant – Cold Squad (Keatley MacLeod Productions/Atlantis Films)
- Andrea Robinson – Doc (Paxson Entertainment/Pebblehut Productions)
- Paula Boudreau – Doc (Paxson Entertainment/Pebblehut Productions)
- Wim Booth – Doc (Paxson Entertainment/Pebblehut Productions)
- Ruth Marshall – Doc (Paxson Entertainment/Pebblehut Productions)
- Rebecca Nagan – Doc (Paxson Entertainment/Pebblehut Productions)

== Best Performance by an Actor in a Featured Supporting Role in a Dramatic Program or Mini-Series ==
- Ted Whittall – Agent of Influence (Alberta Filmworks/Galafilm/Alliance Atlantis/CTV)
- Adrien Dorval – 100 Days in the Jungle (ImagiNation Film and Television/Sextant Entertainment)
- Aidan Devine – 100 Days in the Jungle (ImagiNation Film and Television/Sextant Entertainment)
- Brendan Fletcher – 100 Days in the Jungle (ImagiNation Film and Television/Sextant Entertainment)
- Aidan Devine – Scar Tissue (Shaftesbury Films)

== Best Performance by an Actress in a Featured Supporting Role in a Dramatic Program or Mini-Series ==
- Janet Wright – Betrayed (Mind's Eye Entertainment/Barna-Alper Productions)
- Michelle Nolden – Hemingway vs. Callaghan (Shaftesbury Films)
- Reagan Pasternak – Hemingway vs. Callaghan (Shaftesbury Films)
- Larissa Laskin – Scar Tissue (Shaftesbury Films)

== Best Individual Performance in a Comedy Program or Series ==
- Brian Hartt – CBC Winnipeg Comedy Festival (CBC)
- Nikki Payne – Comedy Now! (CTV/Hi Guys Ten Productions)
- Omid Djalili – Just for Laughs (Just for Laughs Comedy Festival/Les Films Rozon)
- Leonie Forbes – Lord Have Mercy! (Leda Serene Films)
- Linda Kash – Made in Canada (Salter Street Films/Island Edge)

== Best Ensemble Performance in a Comedy Program or Series ==
- Greg Thomey, Colin Mochrie, Mary Walsh, Cathy Jones – This Hour Has 22 Minutes (Salter Street Films/CBC)
- Jeff Clarke, Katherine Ashby – A Guy and a Girl (Big Motion Pictures)
- Hélène Joy, Rick Roberts, Stewart Francis, Timm Zemanek, Robin Brûlé, Sugith Varughese, Matthew Ferguson – An American in Canada (S&S Productions/CBC)
- Dan Lett, Peter Keleghan, Rick Mercer, Jackie Torrens, Leah Pinsent – Made in Canada (Salter Street Films/Island Edge)
- Cory Bowles, Sarah Dunsworth-Nickerson, Lucy DeCoutere, John Dunsworth, Mike Smith, John Paul Tremblay, Barrie Dunn, Michael Jackson, Sam Tarasco, Jonathan Torrens, Robb Wells, Ellen Page, Shelley Thompson, Patrick Roach – Trailer Park Boys (Showcase/Topsail Entertainment)

== Best Performance or Host in a Variety Program or Series ==
- Seán Cullen – 17th Gemini Awards (Academy of Canadian Cinema & Television/CBC Television)
- Rick Mercer, Roseanne MacKenzie, Fiona MacGillivray, Ciarán MacGillivray, Jimmy MacKenzie – 2003 East Coast Music Awards (East Coast Music Association/CBC Halifax)
- Dave Foley, Jason Priestley, Joe Flaherty, Dick Dale, Tom Green, Crissy Guerrero, Andy Richter, Dave Thomas, Jann Arden, Kevin McDonald, Elvis Stojko, Mike Myers, Paul Irving, El Vez, Lisa Hockly – The True Meaning of Christmas Specials (CBC)
- Sharon Lewis – ZeD (CBC)

== Best Performance in a Performing Arts Program or Series ==
- Édith Sauvé-Letellier, Shira Wohlberg, Samuel Tétreault, Lucie Vigneault, Koichi Yano, Geneviève Gauthier, Peter James, Geneviève Lemay, Mike Brannigan, Antoine Carabinier-Lepine, Jano Chiasson, Marie-Michelle Faber, Andréane Leclerc, Van Anh Le Tran, Thanh Dinh Huynh, Manuel Roque – Cirque Orchestra (Cirque Éloize)
- Lisa Prescott, Shadell Permanand, Brainerd Blyden-Taylor, Melissa Adamson, Nicole Jordan, Charles Logan, Marque Smith, Sean Nix, Tom Lillington, Darryl Huggins, Ben D'Cunha, Gerard Chrysostum-Louis, John Botten, Jamie Hillman, Nadine McHorgh, Bramwell Pemberton, Anthony Faure, Justin Bacchus, Gillian Stecyk, Karen Outram, Mosa Neshama, Cissy Goodridge, Ali Garrison, Trisha Dayal, Carolyn Williams, Mark Rainey – Carry Me Home: The Story & Music of the Nathaniel Dett Chorale (Riddle Films/VisionTV)
- Linda Melsted, John Abberger, Derek Conrod, Ronald George, Thomas Georgi, Geneviève Gilardeau, Mylène Guay, Timothy Haig, Christopher Haritatos, Gillian Howard, Patrick G. Jordan, Jeanne Lamon, Alison Mackay, Stephen Marvin, Alison Melville, Dominic Teresi, Christopher Verrette, Allen Whear, David Willms, Elly Winer, Cristina Zacharias – Le Mozart noir (Media Headquarters)
- Oscar Peterson – Opening Night (Canadian Broadcasting Corporation)
- Guylaine St-Onge, Roberto Campanella, Ted Banfalvi, Brianna Lombardo, Richard Smith, Tiffany Amber Knight – Year of the Lion (Mossanen Productions)

== Best Performance in a Preschool Program or Series ==
- Tim Gosley, Jani Lauzon, Julie Burroughs, Pier Paquette, Hugolin Chevrette-Landesque, France Chevrette, André Meunier – Wumpa's World (Cité-Amérique, CCTV)
- Rebecca Nagan, Wim Booth, Julie Westwood, Gillie Robic, Mark Jefferis, Don Austen, Brian Herring – The Hoobs – Beautiful (The Jim Henson Company/Decode Entertainment)
- Keir Knight, Sayaka Karasugi, Jorden Morris, Rick Jones, Jennifer Welsman, Elizabeth Olds – The Toy Castle (Sound Venture Productions)

== Best Performance in a Children’s or Youth Program or Series ==
- Jake Epstein – Degrassi: The Next Generation (Bell Media/Epitome Pictures)
- Alison Pill – The Dinosaur Hunter (Independent Moving Productions)
- Kristin Kreuk – Edgemont (CBC/Omnifilm Entertainment)
- Dominic Zamprogna – Edgemont (CBC/Omnifilm Entertainment)
- Stephen Ouimette – Mentors (Mind's Eye Entertainment/Anaid Productions)

== Best News Anchor ==
- Peter Mansbridge – The National/CBC News (CBC)
- Ian Hanomansing – Canada Now (CBC)
- Kevin Newman – Global National (Global Television Network)

== Best Reportage ==
- Don Murray – The National/CBC News – The Conflict in Iraq (CBC)
- Alan Waterman – Canada Now (CBC)
- Neil MacDonald – The National/CBC News (CBC)
- Paul Workman – The National/CBC News (CBC)
- Tom Kennedy – CTV National News (CTV News)
- Avis Favaro – CTV National News (CTV)

== Best Host or Interviewer in a News Information Program or Series ==
- Mark Kelley – CBC News: Disclosure (CBC)
- Steve Paikin – Studio 2 (TVOntario)
- Gillian Findlay – CBC News: Disclosure (CBC)
- Carole MacNeil – CBC News: Sunday (CBC)
- Craig Oliver – Question Period (CTV)

== Best Host or Interviewer in a Lifestyle/General Interest or Talk Program or Series ==
- Debbie Travis – Debbie Travis' Facelift – Elsy's New Home/Ivars' Garage/Karen's Basement (Whalley-Abbey Media Holdings)
- Norma Lee MacLeod – CBC Newsworld – Health Matters (CBC)
- Marilyn Denis – CityLine (Citytv)
- Peter Jordan – It's a Living (CBC Manitoba/Life Network)
- Carrie Olver – Spectacular Spas (Life Network)

== Best Host or Interviewer in a Practical Information, or Performing Arts Program or Series ==
- Debbie Travis – Debbie Travis' Painted House (Whalley-Abbey Media Holdings)
- David Gale – Loving Spoonfuls (W Network)
- Nik Manojlovich – Savoir Faire Specials (Primevista Television)
- Pat Mastroianni – Music Works (CBC Television)
- Kristina Matisic, Anna Wallner – The Shopping Bags (Force Four Entertainment, Worldwide Bag Media)

== Best Host or Interviewer in a Sports Program or Sportscast ==
- Scott Oake – Hockey Night in Canada Presents – Brett Hull (CBC Sports)
- Norma Jean Wick – Raptors Post-Up – L.A. Clippers at Toronto Raptors (Global Television Network)
- James Duthie – NHL on TSN – Pre-Game (TSN)

== Best Sports Play-by-Play or Analyst ==
- Terry Leibel – 2002 CN International Equestrian Hat at Spruce Meadows (CBC Sports)
- Harry Neale – Hockey Night in Canada 2002 – Stanley Cup Play (CBC Sports)
- Bob Cole – Hockey Night in Canada 2002 – Stanley Cup Play (CBC Sports)
- Chris Cuthbert – CFL on CBC: 90th Grey Cup Championship (CBC Sports)
- Glen Suitor – CFL on CBC: Wendy's Friday Night Football on TSN (CBC Sports/TSN)

== Best Photography in a Dramatic Program or Series ==
- Luc Montpellier – Hemingway vs. Callaghan (Shaftesbury Films)
- David Frazee – 100 Days in the Jungle (ImagiNation Film and Television/Sextant Entertainment)
- Éric Cayla – Silent Night (Fast Carrier Pictures/Hallmark Channel/Muse Entertainment)
- Steve Cosens – The Eleventh Hour (Alliance Atlantis)
- Marc Charlebois – The Last Chapter II: The War Continues (Ciné Télé Action)

== Best Photography in a Comedy, Variety, Performing Arts Program or Series ==
- Michael Spicer – Year of the Lion (Mossanen Productions)
- Jean Renaud – East Coast Music Awards (East Coast Music Association/CBC Halifax)
- Charles Goldman, Normand Chassé – Amanda Marshall – Everybody's Got a Story (Copy Zero)
- Dave Fairfield – Live At The Rehearsal Hall (Bravo!)
- Michael Spicer, Horst Zeidler – Stormy Weather: The Music of Harold Arlen (BBC/CBC/Canadian Television Fund/Rhombus Media/TV Australia/Trio/Telefilm Canada)

== Best Photography in an Information Program or Series ==
- Allan Leader – Daily Planet (Discovery Channel)
- Ross MacIntosh – Daily Planet (Discovery Channel)
- Ihor Macijiwsky – Great Canadian Rivers (Good Earth Productions)
- Laurent Quesnel, Russell Gienapp, Jacques Desharnais – Mystery Hunters (Apartment 11 Productions)
- Mark Foerster – The Sex Files (Exploration Production)

== Best Photography in a Documentary Program or Series ==
- Marc Gadoury – Water Marks (Productions Erezi)
- Michael Grippo – A Child's Century of War (Bishari Films)
- Willie Lypko, Wayne Abbott – Cold War Love: The Story of Mark & Yvette McKoy (Northern Sky Entertainment)
- Patrick McGowan – Forensic Factor (Exploration Production)
- Maurice Chabot – Life and Times – Destiny: The Life and Times of Pope John Paul II (CBC)

== Best Visual Effects ==
- Shannon Gurney, James Tichenor, Craig Van Den Biggelaar, Kevin Little, Robin Hackl, Adam de Bosch Kemper, Mark Breakspear, Krista McLean – Stargate SG-1 – Revelations (Stargate SG-1 Productions)
- Alex Boothby – Hemingway vs. Callaghan (Shaftesbury Films)
- Rainy Venne, Anthony Paterson, Mark Fordham, Ian Britton, Allan Walker, Andrew Nguyen, Matthew Schofield – No Night Is Too Long (Alliance Atlantis/BBC/Studios Victoria)
- Anthony Paterson, Mark Fordham, Ian Britton, Graham Cunningham, Jim Maxwell, Allan Walker, Matthew Schofield, Gudrun Heinze, Michael Pieczonka, Rainy Venne – The Man Who Saved Christmas (Alliance Atlantis/Orly Adelson Productions)
- Nathan Whitford, Konstantinos Mavromichalis – ZeD (CBC)

== Best Picture Editing in a Dramatic Program or Series ==
- George Roulston – The Many Trials of One Jane Doe (Original Pictures/Indian Grove Productions/Studio Eight Productions/Muse Entertainment/CBC)
- Stephen Withrow, Derek Lang – Degrassi: The Next Generation – White Wedding (Bell Media/Epitome Pictures)
- Myriam Poirier – Bliss – Voice (Galafilm/Back Alley Film Productions)
- James Brelin – Chasing Cain: Face (Indian Grove Productions/Muse Entertainment/Salter Street Films)
- Jane Morrison – Da Vinci’s Inquest (Haddock Entertainment/Barna-Alper Productions/Alliance Atlantis/CBC)

== Best Picture Editing in a Comedy, Variety, Performing Arts Program or Series ==
- Jeff Bessner – Year of the Lion (Mossanen Productions)
- Craig Webster – Made in Canada (Salter Street Films/Island Edge)
- Alan MacLean – Le Mozart noir (Media Headquarters)
- Craig Bateman – Popstars: The One (Lone Eagle Entertainment)
- Scott Winlaw, Peter Steel – ZeD (CBC)

== Best Picture Editing in an Information Program or Series ==
- Gary Akenhead – CBC News: Disclosure (CBC)
- John Watson – 21c (CTV Television Network)
- Luke McCarty, Shaun Ghallager – FashionTelevision (Citytv)
- Alexandre Frénois, George T. Clarke, Zsolt Luka – Mystery Hunters (Apartment 11 Productions)
- Kelly A. Morris – the fifth estate (CBC)

== Best Picture Editing in a Documentary Program or Series ==
- Deborah Palloway – A Child's Century of War (Bishari Films)
- Mike Munn – Dave Bidini: The Hockey Nomad (Mercury Films)
- Tai Zimmer, Jeff Lively, Chris Mullington – A Day In The Life Of Canada (CBC)
- Nick Hector – Stories from the War Zone – Inside Information (CBC)
- Tina Hahn – Life's a Twitch! (NFB)

== Best Production Design or Art Direction in a Dramatic Program or Series ==
- Craig Sandells – The Atwood Stories – Betty (Shaftesbury Films)
- John Blackie – Agent of Influence (Alberta Filmworks/Galafilm/Alliance Atlantis/CTV)
- Michael Diner, Kate Marshall, Catherine Schroer – Da Vinci’s Inquest – Dizzy Looking Down (Haddock Entertainment/Barna-Alper Productions/Alliance Atlantis/CBC)
- Jerri Thrasher, Paul Ames – Hemingway vs. Callaghan (Shaftesbury Films)
- John Blackie – Mutant X – Past As Prologue (Fireworks Entertainment/Marvel Studios/Global Television Network)
- Mark Davidson, Robert Davidson, Brentan Harron, Doug McLean, Ivana Vasak, Bridget McGuire, Richard Hudolin – Stargate SG-1 (Stargate SG-1 Productions)

== Best Production Design or Art Direction in a Non-Dramatic Program or Series ==
- Aidan Leroux, Rhonda Moscoe, Teresa Przybylski – Stormy Weather: The Music of Harold Arlen (BBC/CBC/Canadian Television Fund/Rhombus Media/TV Australia/Trio/Telefilm Canada)
- André-Line Beauparlant – Viva la Frida! (Canal 22/Cine Qua Non Films/TV UNAM)
- André Barbe – A Montreal Story in Song
- Karen Wilson – Mob Stories – King of the Bootleggers (MDF Productions)
- Stephen Osler, Tom Anthes – This Hour Has 22 Minutes (Salter Street Films/CBC)
- Glenn McMinn – Tucked Into Bedlam (CBC)

== Best Costume Design ==
- Alex Reda – Hemingway vs. Callaghan (Shaftesbury Films)
- Debra Hanson – Stormy Weather: The Music of Harold Arlen (BBC/CBC/Canadian Television Fund/Rhombus Media/TV Australia/Trio/Telefilm Canada)
- Derek J. Baskerville – The Atwood Stories (Shaftesbury Films)
- Mary Kerr – The Toy Castle – Snowflakes, Ballerina Big Top & Little Rag Doll (Sound Venture Productions)
- Patti Bain Parsons – This Hour Has 22 Minutes (Salter Street Films/CBC)

== Best Achievement in Make-Up ==
- Penny Lee, Karen Byers – This Hour Has 22 Minutes (Salter Street Films/CBC)
- Prudence Olenik – 100 Days in the Jungle (ImagiNation Film and Television/Sextant Entertainment)
- Annemarie Cassidy – Trailer Park Boys (Showcase/Topsail Entertainment)
- Laura MacCon, Jacqueline Robertson Cull – Le Mozart noir (Media Headquarters)
- Francesca von Zimmermann, Ryan Nicholson – Andromeda (Fireworks Entertainment/Tribune Entertainment/BLT Productions/Global/MBR Productions)

== Best Sound in a Dramatic Program ==
- Brandon Walker, Grant Bone, Stephan Carrier, Douglas Ganton, Steve Hammond, Martin Lee – The Many Lives of Albert Walker (Alliance Atlantis/BBC/CTV/Isle of Man Film/Little Bird Productions)
- Brian Campbell, Joe Spivak, Garrell Clark, Adam Boyd, Iain Pattison, Jacqueline Cristianini, Paul A. Sharpe – 100 Days in the Jungle (ImagiNation Film and Television/Sextant Entertainment)
- Steve Hasiak, Rob Bryanton, Warren St. Onge, Matt Besler, Larry McCormick, Evan Rust – Betrayed (Mind's Eye Entertainment/Barna-Alper Productions)
- Scott Donald, Richard Betanzos, Véronique Gabillaud, David Gertsman, Michael Gurman, Paul Hubert – Silent Night (Fast Carrier Pictures/Hallmark Channel/Muse Entertainment)
- Joseph Rossi, Philip J. MacCormick, Tony Gronick, Gashtaseb Ariana, Mario Loubert, Hennie Britton, Michael P. Keeping – The New Beachcombers (CBC/Soapbox Productions)

== Best Sound in a Dramatic Series ==
- Tim Peters, John R.S. Taylor, Miguel Nunes, James Kusan, Patrick Haskill, Brad Hillman – Da Vinci’s Inquest (Haddock Entertainment/Barna-Alper Productions/Alliance Atlantis/CBC)
- David Hibbert, Jacqueline Cristianini, Bill Mellow, Rick Bal, Mike Olekshy, Joe Spivak, Kelly Cole – Cold Squad (Keatley MacLeod Productions/Atlantis Films)
- Devan Kraushar, Kirby Jinnah, Dave Hibbert, Sina Oroomchi, Iain Pattison, David M. Cyr – Stargate SG-1 (Stargate SG-1 Productions)
- Susan Fairbairn, Christian T. Cooke, Ian Rankin, Leon Johnson, Sid Lieberman, Fred Brennan – The Atwood Stories – Isis in Darkness (Shaftesbury Films)
- Steve Smith, Michael Bedard, Bill Sheppard, Dean Giammarco, Christine LcLeod, Maureen Murphy, Johnny Ludgate, Michael Playfair – Tom Stone (Seven24 Films/Alberta Filmworks/CBC)

== Best Sound in a Comedy, Variety, or Performing Arts Program or Series ==
- Simon Bowers, Doug McClement, Ian Dunbar, Howard Baggley, Peter Campbell – Juno Awards of 2003 (Canadian Academy of Recording Arts and Sciences, CTV)
- Daniel Pellerin, Goro Koyama, Andy Malcolm, Daniel Hamood, Dwayne Newman, Attila Lazslo – Puppets Who Kill – The Payback (Eggplant Picture & Sound)
- Krista Wells, Neal Gaudet, Bob Melanson, Luc Leger, Amy Miller, René Beaudry – Made in Canada (Salter Street Films/Island Edge)
- Orest Sushko, Ed Marshall, Darcy Kite, David Rose, Stephan Carrier – Northern Light: Visions & Dreams (MDF Productions/Eccentrics Things)
- Sid Lieberman, Lou Solakofski, Martin Lee, Ronayne Higginson, Jane Tattersall, Kathy Choi, David McCallum, David Rose – Stormy Weather: The Music of Harold Arlen (BBC/CBC/Canadian Television Fund/Rhombus Media/TV Australia/Trio/Telefilm Canada)

== Best Sound in an Information/Documentary Program or Series ==
- Sanjay Mehta, Grant Edmonds – (NFB)
- Cory Rizos, Jacques Comtois, Daniel Masse, Philippe Scultety – Chiefs – The Black Hawk War (Galafilm/NFB)
- Peter Sawade, Elma Bello, Alison Clark, Daniel Pellerin, Andrew Tay – A Child's Century of War (Bishari Films)
- Goro Koyama, Andy Malcolm, Geoff Raffan, Dwayne Newman, Brian Schwarz, Mishuk Munier – Return To Kandahar (Icebreaker Films/CBC)
- Michael P. Keeping, Ewan Deane, Brent Marchenski, Hennie Britton, Jeff Davis – Guinea Pig Club (Infinity Films)

== Best Original Music Score for a Program or Mini-Series ==
- Mike Shields – 100 Days in the Jungle (ImagiNation Film and Television/Sextant Entertainment)
- Ari Wise, Brian Carson – The Christmas Orange (Bardel Entertainment)
- Jean-Marie Benoît – Agent of Influence (Alberta Filmworks/Galafilm/Alliance Atlantis/CTV)
- James Gelfand – Silent Night (Fast Carrier Pictures/Hallmark Channel/Muse Entertainment)
- Christopher Dedrick – No Night Is Too Long (Alliance Atlantis/BBC/Studios Victoria)
- Robert Carli – Hemingway vs. Callaghan (Shaftesbury Films)

== Best Original Music Score for a Dramatic Series ==
- George Blondheim – Da Vinci’s Inquest (Haddock Entertainment/Barna-Alper Productions/Alliance Atlantis/CBC)
- Jason Cullimore, Rob Bryanton, Ross Nykiforuk – 2030 CE (Mind's Eye Entertainment/Buffalo Gal Pictures/Angela Bruce Productions/Yan Moore Productions)
- James Jandrisch – Cold Squad (Keatley MacLeod Productions/Atlantis Films)
- Donald Quan – Mutant X (Fireworks Entertainment/Marvel Studios/Global Television Network)
- Eric Robertson, Mike Batt, David Greene – Watership Down (Decode Entertainment/Nepenthe Productions/Alltime Entertainment)

== Best Original Music Score for a Documentary Program or Series ==
- Philip Strong, Laurel MacDonald – Year of the Lion (Mossanen Productions)
- Jac Gautreau – Record Man: The Life and Times of Sam Sniderman (West Street Pictures)
- Lance Neveu – Chiefs – The Black Hawk War (Galafilm/NFB)
- Patric Caird – The Boys of Buchenwald (Paperny Films)
- John Welsman – The Sacred Balance – The Matrix of Life (Kensington Communications)

== Special awards ==
- Gordon Sinclair Award for Broadcast Journalism – Brian McKenna
- Earle Grey Award – Jennifer Dale
- Margaret Collier Award – Charles Lazer
- Gemini Award for Outstanding Technical Achievement – Dan Diaconu
- Canada Award: Gerald Packer, Liam Romalis – Carry Me Home: The Story & Music of the Nathaniel Dett Chorale
- Academy Achievement Award – Michael Maclear
- Viewers' Choice Award for Geminis' Favourite Comedian – Mike Smith, Trailer Park Boys
- Gemini Humanitarian Award: Max Keeping
- Geminis' Hottest Star: Gordon Michael Woolvett
- Gemini Award for Most Popular Website Competition: Stephen Stohn, Linda Schuyler, Roma Khanna, Raja Khanna – Degrassi: The Next Generation http://www.degrassi.tv
