= Wumpa =

Wumpa may refer to:

- Wumpa's World, a cartoon
- Wumpa fruit, a fictional fruit in the Crash Bandicoot video game series
