= Hawaii Five-O (1968 TV series) season 11 =

Hawaii Five-O
- Season 11
- No. of episodes: 21

Release
- Original network: CBS
- Original release: September 28, 1978 – April 5, 1979

Season chronology
- ← Previous; Season 10 Next → Season 12

This is a list of episodes from the eleventh season of Hawaii Five-O. This season marks the final series appearance of James MacArthur.

== Broadcast history ==
The season originally aired Thursdays at 9:00-10:00 pm (EST).

== DVD release ==
The season was released on DVD by Paramount Home Video.

== Episodes ==
No. overall	No. in season	Title	Directed by	Written by	Original release date	Prod. code
242	1	"The Sleeper"	Barry Crane	John Melson	September 28, 1978	1310-1729-0805
After a government agent is murdered, McGarrett must identify the traitor in a scientific facility. Andrew Duggan and Steve Kanaly guest stars.
243	2	"Horoscope for Murder"	Ralph Levy	Arthur Bernard Lewis	October 5, 1978	1310-1729-0806
When an astrologer (Samantha Eggar) visits McGarrett to inform him of a murderer with a terrible temper, his antagonism lessens when her assumptions seem to be partly true. Tab Hunter guest stars.
244	3	"Deadly Courier"	Reza Badiyi	Seeleg Lester and Sam Neuman	October 12, 1978	1310-1729-0809
While McGarrett follows a false lead, an undercover Danno is discovered and brainwashed to carry out the assassination of McGarrett. Stephen Elliott and Irene Yah-Ling Sun guest stars.
245	4	"The Case Against Philip Christie"	Dick Moder	Seeleg Lester	October 19, 1978	1310-1729-0802
McGarrett is the lone hold-out in a trial where the guilt of the accused seems certain. Janis Paige, Lou Richards and Eugene Lion guest stars.
246	5	"Small Potatoes"	Reza Badiyi	Richard DeLong Adams	October 26, 1978	1310-1729-0812
Hired by a crime-syndicate chieftain, a jet-setter and his girlfriend scheme to discredit McGarrett. Zohra Lampert and Richard Romanus guest stars.
247	6	"A Distant Thunder"	Dennis Donnelly	Al Martinez	November 9, 1978	1310-1729-0801
Danny goes undercover in a neo-Nazi organization to investigate a violent hate campaign directed against a congressional hopeful. James Olson guest stars.
248	7	"Death Mask"	Ralph Levy	Robert I. Holt	November 16, 1978	1310-1729-0808
When a street robber claims that he stole King Tutankhamen's mask for fun, McGarrett suspects there is more to the case than simple robbery. Cyd Charisse, Rory Calhoun, Tim Thomerson and Robert Ellenstein guest stars. NOTE: Laura Sode-Matteson begins her regular series appearance as McGarrett's secretary, Luana.
249	8	"The Pagoda Factor"	Dennis Donnelly	S : Irv Pearlberg; S/T : Al Martinez	November 23, 1978	1310-1729-0807
McGarrett engineers a convict's (Brian Tochi) escape so he can rejoin his gang and provide information about their activities. Dane Clark guest stars.
250	9	"A Long Time Ago"	Robert L. Morrison	Arthur Bernard Lewis	November 30, 1978	1310-1729-0810
Danno is stunned to learn that a former flame (Katherine Cannon) is apparently a shoplifter and a fugitive's (Burr DeBenning) girlfriend.
251	10	"Why Won't Linda Die?"	Jack Lord	Ken Pettus	December 14, 1978	1310-1729-0816
The death of a prominent politician reveals a strange love triangle. Sharon Farrell guest stars.
252	11	"The Miracle Man"	Lawrence Dobkin	Robert Janes	December 21, 1978	1310-1729-0817
An evangelist (Keith Baxter) is assaulted by a man who claims the preacher is responsible for his wife's death. James Sikking and Jean Marsh guest star.
253	12	"Number One with a Bullet"	Don Weis	Robert Janes	December 28, 1978	1310-1729-0813
254	13	"Number One with a Bullet"	Don Weis	Robert Janes	January 4, 1979	1310-1729-0814
A local mobster's plans to acquire a nightclub include murdering its mainland mob partner. James Darren, Yvonne Elliman, Ross Martin, Nehemiah Persoff, Antony Ponzini, Richard Dimitri and Brian Tochi guest stars. NOTE: First appearance of the character Tony Alika (Ross Martin).
255	14	"The Meighan Conspiracy"	Robert L. Morrison	Seeleg Lester	January 18, 1979	1310-1729-0819
When a robbed bank vault shows no signs of break-in, an inside job seems the likely solution. McGarrett's trail of clues leads him back to the builder (Robert Reed) of the vault and his wife (Barbara Anderson).
256	15	"The Spirit Is Willie"	Reza Badiyi	S : Sam Neuman; S/T : Seeleg Lester	January 25, 1979	1310-1729-0821
Millicent Shand (Mildred Natwick) returns and claims that her niece's (Diana Scarwid) husband has faked his own death in order to get his hands on $500,000. Robert Vaughn and Eduard Franz guest stars.
257	16	"The Bark and the Bite"	Don Weis	S : Shelly Mitchell; S/T : Richard deRoy	February 8, 1979	1310-1729-0815
A vacationing heiress (Tricia O'Neil) seems unconcerned when McGarrett warns her that someone (John Saxon) is after her ruby. Nita Talbot guest stars.
258	17	"Stringer"	Ray Austin	S : Paul Williams; S/T : Robert Janes	February 22, 1979	1310-1729-0822
A shady photographer (Paul Williams) becomes involved with gangsters. Sandra Kerns, Ross Martin and Robert Clarke guest stars.
259	18	"The Execution File"	Don Weis	Don Balluck	March 1, 1979	1310-1729-0824
A private detective (Robert Loggia) is rescuing girls from prostitution, and using the opportunity to kill the pimps as well. John Larch and Kaki Hunter guest stars.
260	19	"A Very Personal Matter"	Harry F. Hogan III	Robert Janes	March 15, 1979	1310-1729-0811
McGarrett must protect a physician (Fritz Weaver) suspected of drug peddling from a grieving father (Cameron Mitchell) whose son died of a drug overdose. Simone Griffeth guest stars.
261	20	"The Skyline Killer"	Beau Van den Ecker	Robert Janes	March 22, 1979	1310-1729-0823
McGarrett and a profit-seeking writer (Charles Cioffi) compete to find a maniacal killer.
262	21	"The Year of the Horse"	Don Weis	Richard DeLong Adams	April 5, 1979	1310-1729-0803
263	22	"The Year of the Horse"	Don Weis	Richard DeLong Adams	April 5, 1979	1310-1729-0803
An Asian dies on a flight from Bangkok to Honolulu when a bag of heroin in her stomach bursts; the trail leads McGarrett and Danny to a Singapore drug ring. Barry Bostwick, Victoria Principal and George Lazenby guest stars. NOTE: This feature-length episode was later shown in two parts in syndication (it was also produced early in the season - in fact, it was filmed before the season premiere - but held back).
