= Mary Kerr (scenographer) =

Canadian scenographer

- Born: Winnipeg, Manitoba, Canada
- Known for: Scenography
- Honours: Fellow of the Royal Society of Canada; Royal Canadian Arts Society; Doctor of Canon Law (honoris causa) St. John’s College, Winnipeg; Doctor of Letters (honoris causa) University of Manitoba
- Website: Official website

Mary Kerr is a Canadian production, costume, and set designer, known for her work in theatre, dance, opera, film, television, and exhibition design. As a production designer, she has created for such companies as The Paris Opera Ballet and the The National Ballet of Canada. She was production designer for the 1994 opening and closing ceremonies of the Commonwealth Games in Victoria.

== Early life and education ==
Mary Kerr was born in Winnipeg, Manitoba. Kerr earned a Bachelor of Fine Arts from the University of Manitoba in sculpture and English Literature. She went on to graduate studies at the University of Waterloo and the University of Toronto's Centre for Medieval Studies.

== Career ==
After completing her master's degree, Kerr began her career in theatre set and costume design in Toronto. She became known for her unusual design work, and her career expanded to include ballet, opera, film, exhibitions, and TV series. Kerr has designed over 300 productions in her career. She has designed for The Danny Grossman Dance Company, Paris Opera Ballet, Royal Winnipeg Ballet, National Ballet of Canada, Stratford Festival, Canadian Opera Company, New Zealand Opera, Vancouver Opera, Pacific Opera Company, Banff Opera Festival and Guelph Spring Festival.

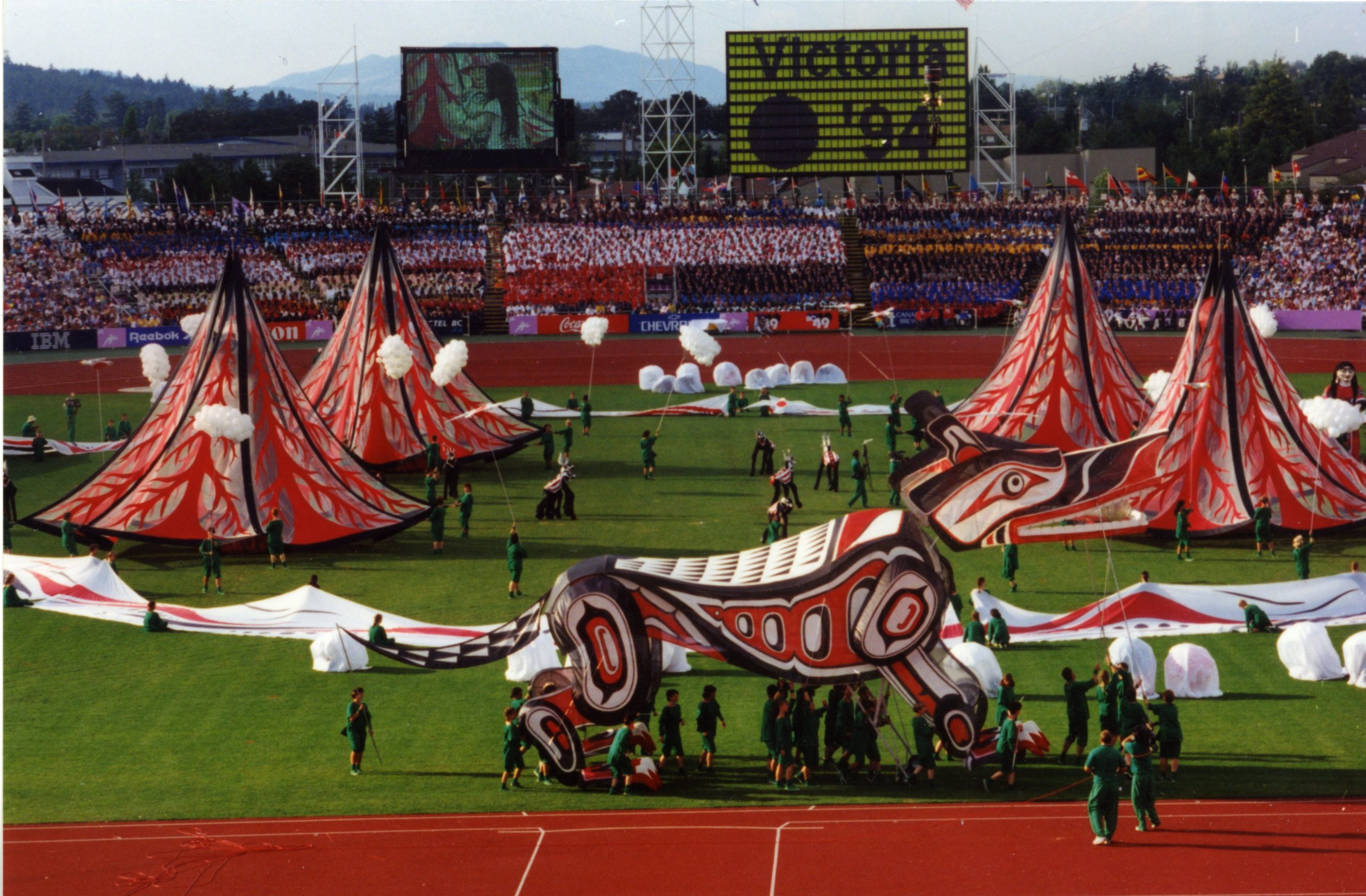
1994 Commonwealth Games Opening Ceremony

=== Indigenous collaboration ===
Kerr has collaboratively designed several exhibitions and theatre productions in tandem with Indigenous communities and artists. The 1994 Commonwealth Games Opening Ceremony featured the oldest creation legend of the Kwakwaka’wakw on the west coast of British Columbia: The Legend of Kawadilikala Other collaborations include: In the Land of the Spirits, the first Indigenous ballet produced by the Canadian Native Arts Society (at the Opera of the National Arts Centre) and Copper Thunderbird, the life story of the Ojibway shaman painter Norval Morrisseau at the National Arts Centre

=== Television and film ===
Kerr began her career in film and television designing costumes for The Tommy Hunter Show, a weekly one-hour variety show for the CBC (1978-80). Kerr worked as the production designer/art director on the following feature films: Nothing Personal (1980), and Double Negative (also released as Deadly Companion) (1980) Designed sets and costumes for multiple Sharon, Lois and Bram tours and their video: Sharon Lois and Bram sing A-Z (1992) and live production films of The Big Top Ballet (Royal Winnipeg Ballet), The Tin Soldier Ballet (Ottawa ballet, 1992) and the Party (National Ballet of Canada). Kerr was production designer for The Toy Castle (2000-2003), an internationally syndicated children’s series which won a Gemini Award for best children’s programming in 2003.

== Special events and exhibitions ==
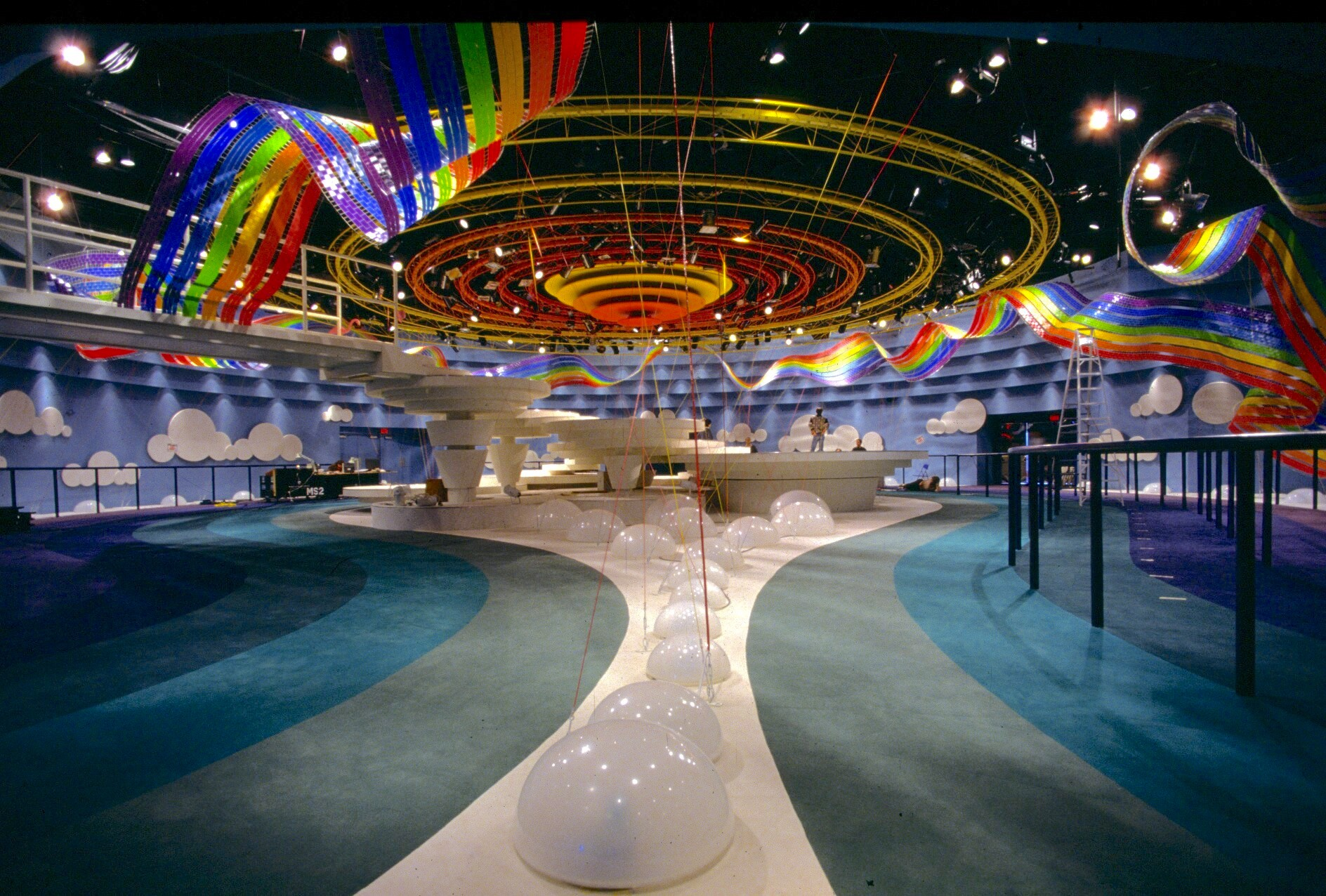
Expo 86, Canadian Pavillion (Vancouver, British Columbia, Canada, 1986)

Kerr has designed for World Expos and opening ceremonies including:

1967: Expo 67, Montreal, Canada

1986: Expo 86, Vancouver, BC: The Canadian Pavilion: Kerr designed and co-produced the First Theatre and Production: The Goose and Beaver show discuss Canada

1994: the opening and closing ceremonies of the 1994 Commonwealth Games in Victoria, British Columbia. Kerr was the production designer for the opening and closing ceremonies

The Prague Quadrennial: Kerr has represented Canada at five Prague Quadrennials (1983, 1999, 2003, 2007, 2019)

== Accolades (selected) ==
1997: Elected to The Royal Canadian Academy of Arts (RCAA)

2010: Elected as a Fellow of the Royal Society of Canada

2020: Awarded the Canada Council for the Arts Molson Prize for contributions to the development of a Canadian Culture

=== Dora Mavor Moore Awards ===
Year	Category	Production	Production Location
1984	Costume Design	In the Jungle of Cities	Toronto Free Theatre (Toronto, Ontario)
1986	Costume Design	The Desert Song	The Shaw Festival (Niagara-on-the-Lake, Ontario)
1988	Costume Design	Nothing Sacred	Canadian Stage (Toronto, Ontario)
1989	Costume Design	The Three Penny Opera	The Banff Opera Festival
1984	Set Design	In the Jungle of the Cities	Toronto Free Theatre (Toronto, Ontario)
1986	Set Design	The Desert Song	The Shaw Festival (Niagara-on-the-Lake, Ontario)
1988	Set Design	Nothing Sacred	Canadian Stage (Toronto, Ontario)

=== Sterling Awards ===
Year	Category	Production	Production Location
1989	Outstanding Set and Costume Design	Nothing sacred (#2)	Canadian Stage (Toronto, Ontario)
2000	Outstanding Costume design	Into the Woods	The Citadel Theatre (Edmonton, Alberta)

=== Gemini Awards (English tv) ===
Year	Category	Production	Production Location
1989	Costume Design	The Big Top Ballet	The Royal Winnipeg Ballet (Winnipeg, Manitoba)
1994	Costume Design	The Tin Soldier	National Arts Center (Ottawa, Ontario)
2003	Best Children’s Show	The Toy Castle	The Royal Winnipeg Ballet (Winnipeg, Manitoba)
