= Jani Lauzon =

Canadian puppeteer

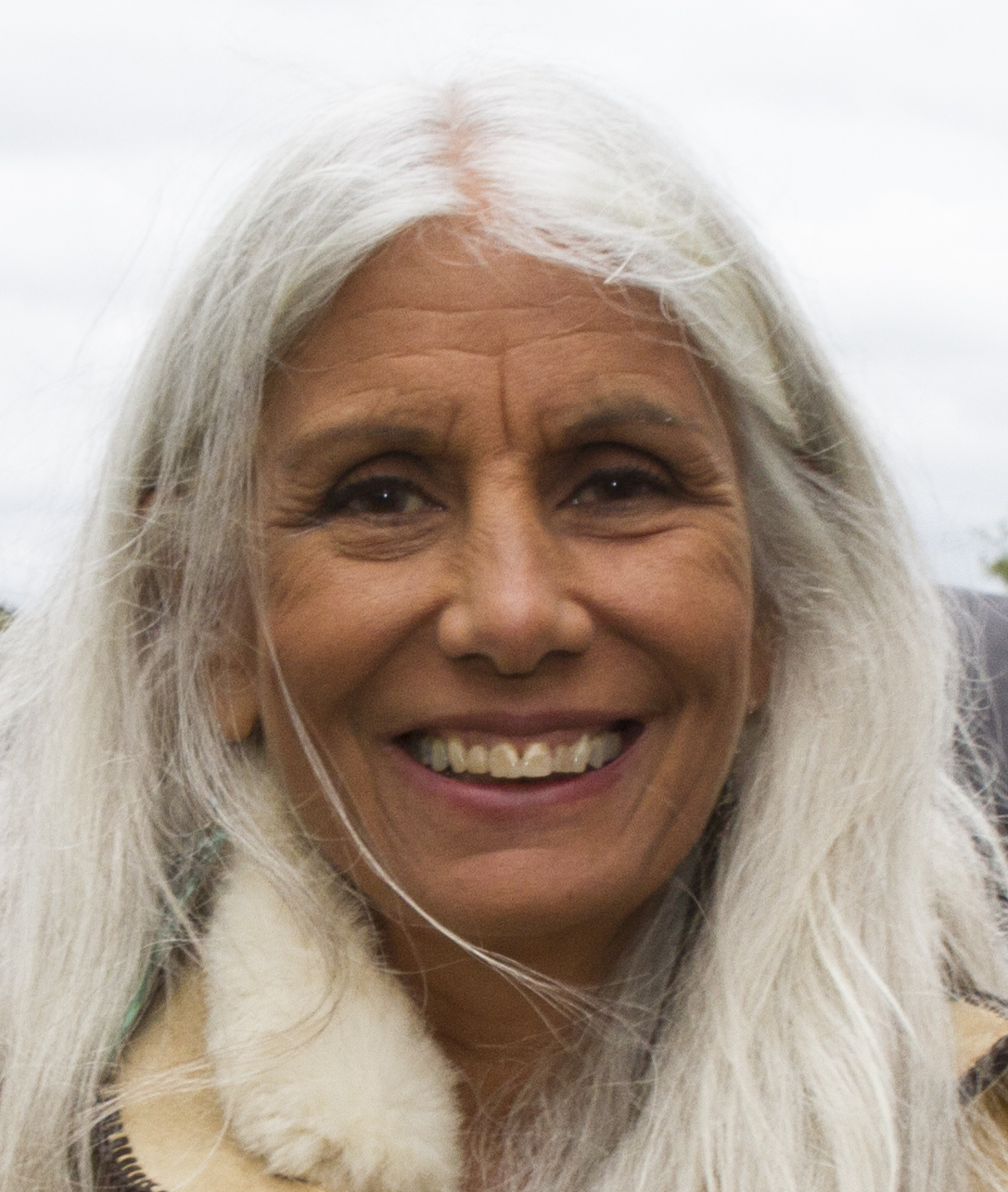
- Jani Lauzon at the 2018 CFC Annual BBQ Fundraiser

Background information
- Born: September 29, 1959 (age 67); East Kootenay region of British Columbia, Canada
- Genre: Jazz
- Instrument: Vocals
- Years active: 1985–present
- Label: RA Records
- Website: www.janilauzon.com

Jani Lauzon (born September 29, 1959) is a Canadian director, and multidisciplinary performer from the East Kootenay region of British Columbia.

== Education and influences ==
Jani Lauzon traces her artistic influences in music, to jazz, soul, and roots music, as well as musical theatre.

Lauzon studied mime and puppetry at South Paris's Celebration Barn Theater in Paris, Maine. She studied clowning with Richard Pochinko. She also studied with world renowned masters including Patsy Rodenburg, Yoshi Oida, David Smukler, Neil Freeman, Eugene Lion, and Tadashi Suzuki.

== Acting ==
Lauzon’s acting roles include Shakespeare and other canonized plays. In 2005, she played Shylock in The Merchant of Venice. In 2010, she played Yvette Pottier in Mother Courage at the NAC. In 2012, she performed a dual role as Cordelia and the Fool in an all-aboriginal production of William Shakespeare's King Lear at the National Arts Centre in Ottawa, alongside a cast that also included August Schellenberg as Lear, Tantoo Cardinal as Regan, Billy Merasty as Gloucester and Craig Lauzon as Kent. (At the time, Lauzan was believed to be Métis.) In 2019, she played Paulina/Old Sheppard at Shakespeare in the Ruff’s production of The Winter's Tale.

Other roles include Storyteller in the Canadian Opera Companies production of Louis Riel in 2017. and Pelija Patchnose in The Rez Sisters at Stratford Festival in 2021.

Lauzon also performs in her own original work. A Side of Dreams opened at Aki Studio Theatre in 2015. It is a multi-disciplinary show that includes music, puppetry, projections, and more. Prophecy Fog opened at Coal Mine Theatre in Ontario in 2023. It is a 75-minute one-woman show.

== Direction and artistic direction ==
In 1998, she co-founded Turtle Gals Performance Ensemble a theatre collective for Native women. It was co-founded by Lauzon, with Monique Mojica and Michelle St. John. She also served as Co-Managing Artistic Director from 1998-2007. After Mojica’s departure Turtle Gals expanded to include Falen Johnson and Cheri Maracle. The collective folded in 2008.

Together with Monique Monica and Michelle St. John they created The Scrubbing Project in 2002, and it had a national tour in 2005-06. They also created Triple Truth. They went on to write and produce The Only Good Indian.

Paper Canoe Projects was founded in 2013 to support “the development and production of multidisciplinary projects in Theatre, Film and Music”.Paper Canoe Projects also produces Lauzon’s original work including Prophecy Fog, I Call Myself Princess and A Side of Dreams.

I Call myself Princess was first produced in 2018 at Native Earth Performing Arts’ Aki Studio. It was co-produced by Cahoots Theatre Company. In 2021, Lauzon directed An Irresistible Urge to Do Something Inadvisable at the Monument-National campus.

Her 2022 production of Where the Blood Mixes at Soulpepper Theatre Company garnered critical acclaim. In 2023, she directed 1939 at the Stratford Festival, a play she co-wrote with Kailtyn Riordan about five Residential school students tasked with performing All’s Well that Ends Well for the Royal Tour.

She directed Alien Creature in 2017 at Theatre Passe Muraille in Toronto, and The Monument in 2018 at Factory Theatre. In 2019, Lauzon directed Almighty Voice and his Wife at Soulpepper, and Rope for the Shaw Festival. In 2023, she directed Yaga at Belfry.

== Puppetry ==
Lauzon has extensive puppetry credits. Muppet credits include Fraggle Rock, additional puppetry on Follow That Bird, performing on The Jim Henson Hour, and a cat in the Sesame Street Canada television special "Basil Hears a Noise". Her other non-Henson credits include Maggie on Groundling Marsh and regular roles on The Big Comfy Couch, The Longhouse Tales, Alligator Pie, Happy Castle, Prairie Berry Pie, Mr. Dressup, Wumpa's World, Little Star and Iris the Happy Professor.

== Television and film ==
Lauzon has also appeared on camera in TV and movies such as Code Name: Eternity, Conspiracy of Silence, Business Management, Maggie's Life, Bingo Road, Destiny Ridge, Ruby and the Well and Saving Hope. She won the Best Supporting Actress award at the American Indian Film Festival for her portrayal of Doris in Amand Ruffo’s film A Windigo Tale as well as Best Actress for the same role at the Dreamspeakers Film Festival.

Her two short films eu·tha·na·sia and Just One Word continue to screen at film festivals around the world.

== Music / radio ==
She has worked as a radio actor on several radio stations including CBC Radio.

Blue Voice / New Voice was produced 1994 and included the popular “99 lbs”. All of the artists were Canadian. Thirst (1998) included tracks written by Lauzon and co-written with Arthur Renwick, amongst others. It included songs such as “Real Rez Blues”, “Lay your Ego Down,” and “Beyond Reason”, that featured Lauzon on the Western flute. Mixed Blessings (2007) centered the hand drum and women’s voices.

Other works include: Hearts of the Nations (1997), Heartbeat 2: More Voices of First Nations Women (1998), and Contemporary Native American Music (2006)

Lauzon plays the Western flute.

== Teaching and honors ==
Lauzon was an artist educator at the junior campus for Toronto’s Claude Watson School for the Arts in the 1980s. She began teaching at the National Theatre School of Canada in 2020.

Lauzon was Senior Playwright in Residence at the Banff Playwright Colony in April 2015.

== Awards ==
Lauzon has been nominated ten times for Dora Mavor Moore Awards. She is a three-time Juno nominated singer/songwriter.

She received the John Hirsch Directors award through the Ontario Arts Council, the Toronto Critics Best Directors Award for her production of The Monument at Factory Theatre. In 2004 she won a Gemini for her role as Seeka in the series Wumpa’s World, the first Metis puppeteer to garner the award. She is a three-time Juno nominated singer/songwriter.

New Voice/Blue Voice, her first album, was a JUNO nominee in 1994. In 2004 she won a Gemini for her role as Seeka in the series Wumpa’s World. In 2008, she was nominated as Best Female Traditional Artist after the release of her CD, Mixed Blessings.

In 2021, she received the ACTRA Toronto Award of Excellence celebrating both her body of work and her commitment to advocacy for inclusion.

== Claim of Indigenous identity ==
In November 2024, amidst a production of her stage play 1939, Lauzon was accused of falsely claiming Metis heritage. After commissioning a genetic test from 23andMe, the test confirmed an Indigenous marker. She is currently working with a genealogist who specializes in Indigenous ancestry.
