= Jennifer Welsman =

Jennifer Welsman is a Canadian ballerina. She was born in Penticton, British Columbia. At an early age, she got involved in dance at the Penticton School of Dance, later becoming a member of the Royal Winnipeg Ballet School in 1993.

In 2001, she had her first lead role in a ballet as Clara in The Nutcracker. She also plays the China Doll in the Canadian-based kids show The Toy Castle. She has also danced Aurora in The Sleeping Beauty, Odette and Odile in Swan Lake, and Tiger Lily and Mrs. Darling in the ballet version of Peter Pan.

She married violinist Simon MacDonald in 2005 at Skaha Lake, British Columbia, Canada.
