= Canada Media Fund =

Canadian filmed content public–private partnership

Fonds des médias du Canada Canada Media Fund
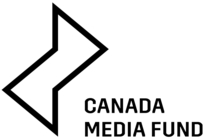
- Established: April 1, 2010; 16 years ago
- Mission: Foster, promote, develop and finance the production of Canadian content and relevant applications.
- Website: cmf-fmc.ca

The Canada Media Fund (CMF, French: Fonds des médias du Canada - FMC) is a public–private partnership founded on April 1, 2010, by the Department of Canadian Heritage and the Canadian cable industry. It is used to fund the creation of original Canadian content and support the Canadian media industry. The fund is composed of contributions made by Canadian broadcasting distribution undertakings (BDUs)—as mandated by the Canadian Radio-television and Telecommunications Commission (CRTC)—and the federal government. It funds roughly $366 million annually.

== History ==
The creation of the Canada Media Fund was announced by Minister of Heritage, James Moore in a speech given on March 9, 2009. It was created as a merger between the Canadian Television Fund (CTF) and the Canada New Media Fund. The fund's origins are rooted to the Canadian Radio-television and Telecommunications Commission's formation of the Cable Production Fund in 1995. From this initiation, the fund was transitioned into the Canada Television and Cable Production Fund (1996), the Canadian Television Fund (1998), the Canada New Media Fund (2001), and the Digital Media Pilot Program (2008), where the following year the Canada Media Fund was born. The fund was created as a way to "[modernize] government investments to support Canadian content in the new era of consumer choice, emerging technology, and investing in Canada's future."

== Administration structure ==
As required by the CRTC, Canadian BDUs are required to contribute 5% of their revenues to the Canada Media Fund. While policy, research and communications rest with the CMF, the day-to-day administration of applications rests with a separate entity, that of the CMF Program Administrator, which is part of Telefilm Canada.

== Funded productions ==
A funded projects database exists on the companies' website.

=== Television series ===
Programs produced in association with CMF/FMC include:

- Animism: The Gods' Lake (2013)
- Baroness von Sketch Show (2011–2018)
- Degrassi: The Next Generation (2001–2015)
- Kim's Convenience (2013–2018)
- Letterkenny (2012)
- Murdoch Mysteries (2010–2018)
- Orphan Black (2011)
- Schitt's Creek (2014–2020)
- Slasher (season 2, 2011)
- Still Standing (season 3, 2011)
- Stories of Our Elders (2014 web series televised in 2018)
- Total Drama (formerly financed by the CTF) (2012–2014)
- Vikings (2013–2018)

=== Video games ===
Video games produced in association with CMF/FMC include:

- Consortium
- My Singing Monsters
- Outlast
- Dead by Daylight
- The Long Dark
- The Low Road
- We Happy Few
- Chariot
- Jotun
- The Messenger
- Outward
- Deceive Inc.

=== Encore+ ===
Encore+
- Other name: Encore Plus

YouTube information
- Channel: Canada Media Fund - Fonds des médias du Canada
- Years active: 2017–2022

The Canada Media Fund previously operated a YouTube channel called Encore+ in collaboration with Telefilm Canada, Deluxe Toronto, BroadbandTV, Bell Media, and Google Canada. This channel was uniquely dedicated to licensing and making freely available outstanding legacy Canadian content, particularly series and films without an existing streaming service presence or physical home media releases.

The service was launched on November 7, 2017, celebrating the 150th anniversary of Canada. Over its lifetime, all Canadian content acquisitions and curation were led by programming and operations lead Paulina Abarca-Cantin.

In early 2022, a separate sister YouTube channel called Encore Plus was created with support from YouTube Canada, to offer a better user-experience for all current and future French-language content. By then Encore+ had also invested in creating Encore+ Originals, tie-in content original to the service and innovated by Abarca-Cantin, heightening discoverability and expanding upon the works on its channels, with Canadian talent providing commentary and exclusive insights for contemporary audiences years after the original production.

Over five years, Encore+ also commissioned the restoration of iconic Canadian feature films including Johnny Mnemonic, The Snow Walker, New Waterford Girl, Eclipse, Monica la mitraille, L'Arrache-cœur, When Night is Falling, Remembrance, La Cueca Sola, A Silent Love and Timothy Findley's The Wars

On November 17 and 18, 2022, official platforms announced that after more than five years of availability, the service (now considered a pilot project) was to shut down on November 30. All media was wiped from both YouTube channels on that date, and the Twitter account and Facebook page with lists of content and discussion were made unavailable.
