= Silent Night (2002 film) =

2002 Canadian television film

- Written by: Roger Aylward
- Directed by: Rodney Gibbons
- Starring: Linda Hamilton; Matthew Harbour; Romano Orzari; Alain Goulem; Martin Neufeld; Mark Antony Krupa; James McGowan; Michael Elkin; Michael Sinelnikoff; Cassian Bopp; Harald Winter
- Narrated by: Michael Sinelnikoff
- Music by: James Gelfand
- Country of origin: Canada
- Original language: English

Production
- Producers: Rory J. Aylward; Steven Hewitt; Irene Litinsky; Michael Prupas; Steven Jay Rubin
- Cinematography: Éric Cayla
- Editor: Vidal Béïque
- Running time: 100 minutes

Original release
- Release: December 14, 2002

Silent Night is a 2002 television film set on Christmas Eve in 1944, during the Battle of the Bulge of World War II and is loosely based on true events.

== Plot ==
A German mother, Elisabeth Vincken (Linda Hamilton), who had already lost her eldest son in the Battle of Stalingrad and whose husband is a cook serving in the German Army, and her younger son, Fritz, are seeking refuge in their family's hunting cabin near the front lines in the Ardennes forests region of western Europe. They encounter three American soldiers who enter the cabin, and then soon after three German soldiers join them. After much resistance the mother manages to convince the enemy soldiers to put aside their differences for one night and share a Christmas dinner. The Germans were planning to kill the Americans, but eventually they and the American soldiers share their rations to make a proper Christmas dinner. This includes homemade cookies and other goodies.

Throughout the night the Americans and Germans befriend each other, despite the fact that they will eventually have to return to the war. The next morning an American MP comes and is surprised by what he sees. As he learns of what has happened he turns his rifle on the American soldiers and begins talking with the Germans. Realizing the officer is really a German soldier who has infiltrated the American lines, the Americans surrender and the three German soldiers get their weapons. The German infiltrator then orders the three other soldiers to execute the Americans. Just before he is about to shoot the mother, one of the German soldiers knocks him out, saving her. The soldiers depart, with the Americans taking the German infiltrator as a prisoner of war. They also, at the request of the senior German officer, take the 15 year old German soldier with them to serve out the rest of the war as a POW. This is due to an earlier conversation where both senior officers expressed their concern to each other that the teen wouldn't survive. The Germans also return to their side. All say goodbye and wish each other good luck for the rest of the war. In the present day, an elder Fritz (Michael Sinelnikoff) is visited by Private Jimmy Rassi's grandson, Christopher, with Fritz handing over Rassi's dogtags which were used to adorn the top of the cabin's Christmas tree.

== Cast ==
- Linda Hamilton as Elisabeth Vincken
- Matthew Harbour as Fritz Vincken
- Romano Orzari as Pvt. Jimmy Rassi
- Alain Goulem as Sgt. Ralph Blank
- Michael Elkin as Pvt. Herbie Ridgin
- Martin Neufeld as Lt. Hans Klosterman
- Mark Antony Krupa as Sgt. Marcus Mueller
- James McGowan as Capt. Dietrich
- Cassian Bopp as Pvt. Peter Heinrich

== Award nominations ==
Silent Night was nominated for four Gemini Awards at the 18th Gemini Awards held in 2003:

- Best Direction in a Dramatic Program or Mini-Series: Rodney Gibbons
- Best Original Music Score for a Program or Mini-Series: James Gelfand
- Best Photography in a Dramatic Program or Series: Eric Cayla
- Best Sound in a Dramatic Program: Scott Donald, Richard Betanzos, Véronique Gabillaud, David Gertsman, Michael Gurman, Paul Hubert

== See also ==
- List of Christmas films

== Notes ==
- Several years before the movie was made, the story was profiled on Unsolved Mysteries, in which Fritz Vincken was seeking information on the American soldiers. The episode resulted in Vincken being reunited with Ralph Blank in Frederick, MD in 1996.
