= Carrie Olver =

Canadian TV personality (born 1967)

Carrie Olver (born 1967) is a Canadian TV personality.

Olver is a native of Moose Jaw, Saskatchewan. She grew up in Toronto, where her father, broadcaster Fergie Olver, worked at CFTO-TV for two decades on Toronto Blue Jays telecasts and also co-hosted the game show Just Like Mom.

Olver began her career in 1990 on Canadian home shopping channels. She then began working for the American Home Shopping Network, where she appeared for more than 2000 hours. Beginning in 1998, she hosted Spectacular Spas, a half-hour travel program to some of the world's top spas.

Olver was nominated for a Gemini Award in 2003 for the program in the category Best Host or Interviewer in a Lifestyle/General Interest Program or Series. She lost to Debbie Travis.

Olver previously appeared on The Weather Network, as a weekday late morning and early afternoon host, weather presenter, and the weather news anchor. Olver appeared on the 9 am to 2 pm shift.

Olver returned to The Shopping Channel in 2014 as their beauty expert, and hosts their premier beauty destination program, Hello Gorgeous.
