= The Atwood Stories =

- Country of origin: Canada
- No. of episodes: 6

Production
- Running time: approx. 0:30 (per episode)

Original release
- Network: W
- Release: February 20 – March 27, 2003

The Atwood Stories is a Canadian television drama series, which aired on W in 2003. A short-run dramatic anthology series produced by Shaftesbury Films, the series dramatized six short stories by Margaret Atwood. It was one of the first original Canadian drama series ever commissioned by the network.

The series was a Gemini Award nominee for Best Drama Series at the 18th Gemini Awards.

The following year, Shaftesbury produced The Shields Stories, a similar series which dramatized six short stories by another Canadian writer, Carol Shields.

== Episodes ==
No.	Title	Directed by	Written by	Original release date	Prod. code
1	"Polarities"	Lori Spring	Lori Spring	February 20, 2003	1-01
A young American in his early 30s (David Sutcliffe) takes a teaching job at a Canadian university, and enters a relationship with a female graduate student (Michèle-Barbara Pelletier).
2	"Betty"	Marni Banack	Lori Spring	February 27, 2003	1-02
Eight-year-old Alice (Megan Diamond) and her older sister (Samantha Kreger) observe the marital breakdown of their neighbours Betty (Sharon Bajer) and Fred (Jonathan Scarfe).
3	"The Man from Mars"	Lynne Stopkewich	Lynne Stopkewich, Doug Taylor	March 6, 2003	1-03
A lonely, overweight young girl, Christine (Emily Hampshire) finds a new sense of herself when she meets an Asian exchange student (Jovanni Sy). Also stars Sonja Smits as Christine's mother.
4	"Death by Landscape"	Stacey Stewart Curtis	Jason Sherman	March 13, 2003	1-04
A landscape painting causes sixty-five-year-old Lois (Roberta Maxwell) to reminisce about the mysterious disappearance of her childhood friend Lucy (Courtney-Jane White) while they are together at a summer camp.
5	"Isis in Darkness"	Norma Bailey	David Young	March 20, 2003	1-05
Aspiring writer Richard (Christian Campbell) is entranced by Selena (Brigitte Bako), an exotic and mysterious young poet he meets in a bohemian Yorkville café.
6	"The Sunrise"	Francine Zuckerman	Francine Zuckerman, Chris Philpott	March 27, 2003	1-06
A reclusive painter (Rebecca Jenkins) finds her life transformed when she meets a young man (Tygh Runyan) who threatens to upset her tidy, ordered life.
