= Canadian Television Fund =

Canadian non-profit corporation

Canadian Television Fund Fonds canadien de télévision
- Founded: 1998; 28 years ago in Canada
- Defunct: April 1, 2010; 16 years ago
- Fate: Merged with the Canada New Media Fund
- Successor: Canada Media Fund

The Canadian Television Fund (Canadian French: Fonds canadien de télévision / formerly The Canada Television and Cable Production Fund), sometimes abbreviated as CTF (Canadian French: FCT), supported the production and broadcast of Canadian television programs. A non-profit corporation operating as a public-private partnership, the CTF was financed by contributions from the Government of Canada through the Department of Canadian Heritage and the Canadian cable and direct-to-home satellite industries.

The CTF developed and implemented policies to offer financial contributions to Canadian producers through specific program funding streams. File administration of these programs was contracted to the Television Business Unit at Telefilm Canada.

On 1 April 2010, the Canadian Television Fund merged with the Canada New Media Fund and formed the Canada Media Fund.

== Responsibilities ==
The Department of Canadian Heritage sets out objectives for the CTF within a Contribution Agreement. The main goal of the CTF is to support the creation and broadcast in peak viewing hours of high-quality Canadian television programs in both official languages in the genres of Drama, Children's and Youth, Documentary, and Variety and Performing Arts, and to build audiences for these programs.

The CTF must also:

- Allocate one-third of its resources to French-language programming and two-thirds to English-language programming
- Support the production of Aboriginal-language programming;
- Encourage production by majority and minority official-language sectors
- Provide incentives for regionally based productions
- Set aside an envelope to support French-language productions from producers outside of Quebec
- Implement a mechanism that enhances access to the CTF by programs supported by educational broadcasters
- Provide developmental support, including script and pilot development
- Allocate an envelope for programs licensed by CBC/Radio-Canada
- Ensure appropriate levels of market access for broadcaster-affiliated production companies and independent production companies, with no competitive advantage in French or English broadcast markets
- Support language versioning and subtitling

The CTF provides financing for the development, production and broadcast of Canadian-made programming in French, English and Aboriginal languages in the following genres: Drama, Children's and Youth, Documentary, and Variety and Performing Arts. The CTF provides four types of contributions to projects: repayable advances (development); grants (versioning); licence fee top-ups (production); and equity investments (production).

The CTF makes financial contributions through five funding streams: Broadcaster Performance Envelopes, Development, French-language Projects Outside Quebec, Aboriginal-language Projects, and Versioning Assistance.

Eligible projects must meet the following four Essential Requirements (4ER) before they can be submitted for consideration to any stream of funding (with the exception of 2ER documentaries):

- The project speaks to Canadians about and reflects Canadian themes and subject matter.
- The project will be certified by the Canadian Audio-Visual Certification Office (CAVCO) and has achieved 10/10 points (or the maximum number of points appropriate to the project), as determined by the CTF using the CAVCO scale.
- Underlying rights are owned and significantly and meaningfully developed by Canadians.
- The project is shot and primarily set in Canada.

The level of the CTF's contribution to a production varies by genre, language and the stream of funding through which the contribution is obtained. Each funding stream may provide a mix of licence fee top-ups and equity investments, according to a set formula.

NB: Some contributions may take forms other than equity or licence fee top-up, such as grants or advances.

== Timeline ==
In 1994, the Canadian Radio-television and Telecommunications Commission (CRTC) proposed establishing a funding initiative that would focus on facilitating the production and broadcast of high-quality Canadian television programs in under-represented categories during peak viewing periods. Its revenues were to come from contributions by broadcasting distribution undertakings (i.e., cable and direct-to-home satellite providers) at a certain percentage of their revenues. What follows is a brief history of the Canadian Television Fund (CTF):

In 1995, the CRTC establishes the Cable Production Fund (CPF). Their goal was to facilitate the production and broadcast of high-quality Canadian television programs in under-represented categories during peak viewing periods.

In 1996, the Department of Canadian Heritage invites the CPF to join it in a redefined public-private partnership in conjunction with Telefilm Canada's Broadcast Development Production Fund. As a result, the CPF were hereby renamed the Canada Television and Cable Production Fund (CTCPF). Regulatory framework changes were made in 1997 and 1998 respectively, and as a result, the CTCPF were once more hereby renamed the Canadian Television Fund (CTF).

2005 saw the beginning of a transition and establishment of a new relationship with Telefilm Canada. Telefilm Canada becomes responsible for the administration of CTF files, while the CTF continues to lead the development of strategic policy and program guidelines, research and to report on audiences and funding results.

The CTF receives its funding from two primary sources: the Department of Canadian Heritage and broadcasting distribution undertakings (BDUs). In addition, the CTF receives revenue from recoupment on production investments made through its Equity Investment Program. Under licence agreements with the Canadian Radio-television and Telecommunications Commission, BDUs are required to contribute up to 5% of their gross broadcasting revenue to Canadian programming, with 1.5% to 5% to be contributed to production funds. Of the total contributions to production funds, at least 80% must be directed to the CTF.

By fostering the growth of television production in Canada through financial investment and industry research, the CTF supports the development of Canadian talent, programs and audiences. Since 1995, the CTF has contributed to the creation of over 25,000 hours of Canadian programming and has infused over $2.5 billion into the industry, triggering the production of over $8 billion of Canadian programming. CTF-supported productions have cultivated thousands of jobs in the Canadian television sector.

On December 20, 2006, Jim Shaw, CEO of Shaw Communications Inc. informed the Canadian Television Fund that he would be pulling approximately $56 million per year out of the fund. The move was later followed by Vidéotron (a subsidiary of Quebecor Inc.) who announced their plans to withdraw their contributions on January 23, 2007.

On July 20, 2007, Keith Mahar, a former manager at broadcaster CHUM Limited, submitted a report to the CRTC, entitled Profiteering in the Name of Culture, respecting the Canadian Television Fund. The submission recommends a judicial review of alleged CRTC corruption related to the Fund which he contends has unjustly enriched cable companies. As per Mr. Mahar, Canadian Radio-television and Telecommunications Commission (CRTC) regulations, cable and satellite television distributors in Canada are required to contribute 5% of their revenue to the fund, which the companies can pass on to their customers in the form of inflated rates service. Since such consumer costs are embedded in their fees for service, consumers are subject to pay the 5% levy plus P.S.T. and G.S.T. on the cost of the company subsidy program. A copy of the submission is posted on the CRTC public file. On February 7, 2008, Mahar issued a press release covered by Reuters which was critical of Prime Minister Stephen Harper for his alleged failure to act on information respecting related activities by the CRTC and corporations in the affair.
