= Neil Freeman =

Neil Freeman may refer to:

- Neil Freeman (English footballer) (born 1955), English football goalkeeper
- Neil Mackenzie Freeman (1890–1961), senior officer of the Australian Army and Australian rules footballer
