= The Tree That Remembers =

- Directed by: Masoud Raouf
- Cinematography: Ali Reggab
- Edited by: Yurij Luhovy; Chaz Oliver
- Music by: Mark Goodwin; Eric LeMoyne
- Production company: National Film Board of Canada (NFB)
- Distributed by: Olive Films
- Release date: 2002
- Running time: 50 minutes
- Country: Canada
- Language: English

The Tree That Remembers is a 2002 animated documentary by Iranian filmmaker Masoud Raouf, exploring the lives of former political prisoners like himself who had been active in the democratic movement during the days of the Shah of Iran, only to face imprisonment and torture under the Islamic regime after the 1979 Iranian revolution.

Produced by the National Film Board of Canada, awards for the film included the Silver Award for Best Canadian Documentary at Hot Docs, as well as a Golden Sheaf Award for Best Social Documentary at the Yorkton Film Festival.
