= Roma Khanna =

American media executive

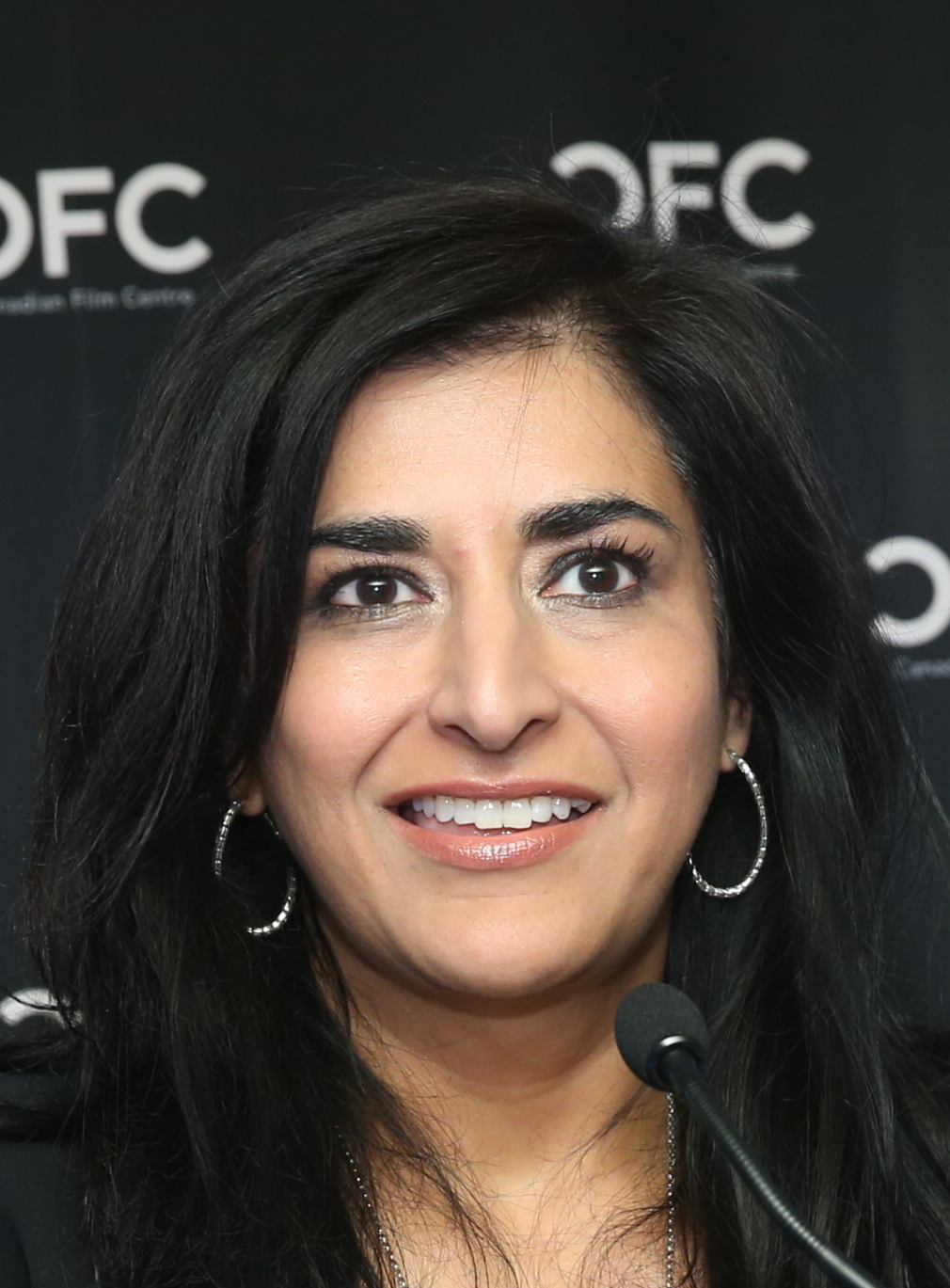
- Occupation: Media executive
- Title: Executive Chair of HiddenLight Productions

Roma Khanna is a television and digital media executive and executive chair of HiddenLight Productions. She was the CEO of Revolt TV, president of Global Networks at NBCUniversal, and president of the TV and digital divisions at MGM Studios.

== Career ==
Between 2008 and 2011, Khanna was the president of global networks for NBCUniversal’s international networks wing. As a part of her position she was charged with running the company's cable television and digital media properties. During this time the company's number of cable channels went from 14 to in excess of 70. Roma Khanna was the president of the TV and digital divisions at MGM Studios between 2011 and 2015, where she was involved in the creation of television series including Fargo on FX, Vikings on History, Teen Wolf on MTV, and Handmaid's Tale on Hulu. During this time she was known for developing original television series based upon source material in MGM's film archives and properties.

In 2017 Khanna was named the CEO of Revolt TV, a cable television network founded by Sean Combs in 2013. In 2020, Khanna became the executive chair of HiddenLight Productions, a collaborative project with Hillary Clinton and Chelsea Clinton. She is also a board member of the Canadian Film Centre.

== Recognition ==
Khanna has been named to the Hollywood Reporter’s list of the 100 most powerful women in entertainment. She is also a member of the advisory board to the Peabody Awards.
