= Joseph Giunta =

Canadian painter

Joseph Giunta (1911–2001) was a Canadian painter whose career spanned over 70 years. He was born in Montreal and began painting at the age of 14. He studied the arts at the Monument National and at the École des Beaux-Arts de Montréal. Giunta also studied with Adrien Hébert in 1925, John Young Johnstone in 1930, as well as in Boston, France and Italy. Throughout his career, Giunta's style evolved into 4 major styles:

- Figuration (1931–1958)
- Gestural Abstraction (1958–1975)
- Geometric and Baroque Constructions (1971–1989)
- Organic Collage-Paintings (1974–2001)

Over the course of more than 60 years, Giunta participated in a host of solo and group exhibitions, including at Quebec City's Zanettin Gallery in 1965 and 1973, as well as at the Quebec Pavilion at the Osaka World's Fair in 1970.

In 2001, the year of his death, a major exhibit at the Maison de la culture Frontenac in Montreal, along with the release of filmmaker Pepita Ferrari's Joseph Giunta: A Silent Triumph, served to pay a tribute to the artist, repositioning Giunta within the artistic scene in Quebec and Canada.
