= 21c (TV series) =

Former CTV Series

21c (or 21st century) was a weekly Canadian newsmagazine television series for teens which aired on CTV from 2001 until 2004. The show was hosted by Dominic Patten and Anne-Marie Mediwake who presented topics related to teen issues. Show producers included:

- Mike Sheerin
- Derek Miller
- Dorothy Dickie
- Ilana Banks
- Bree Tiffin
- Akua Otupiri
