= James Gelfand =

Canadian jazz pianist (born 1959)

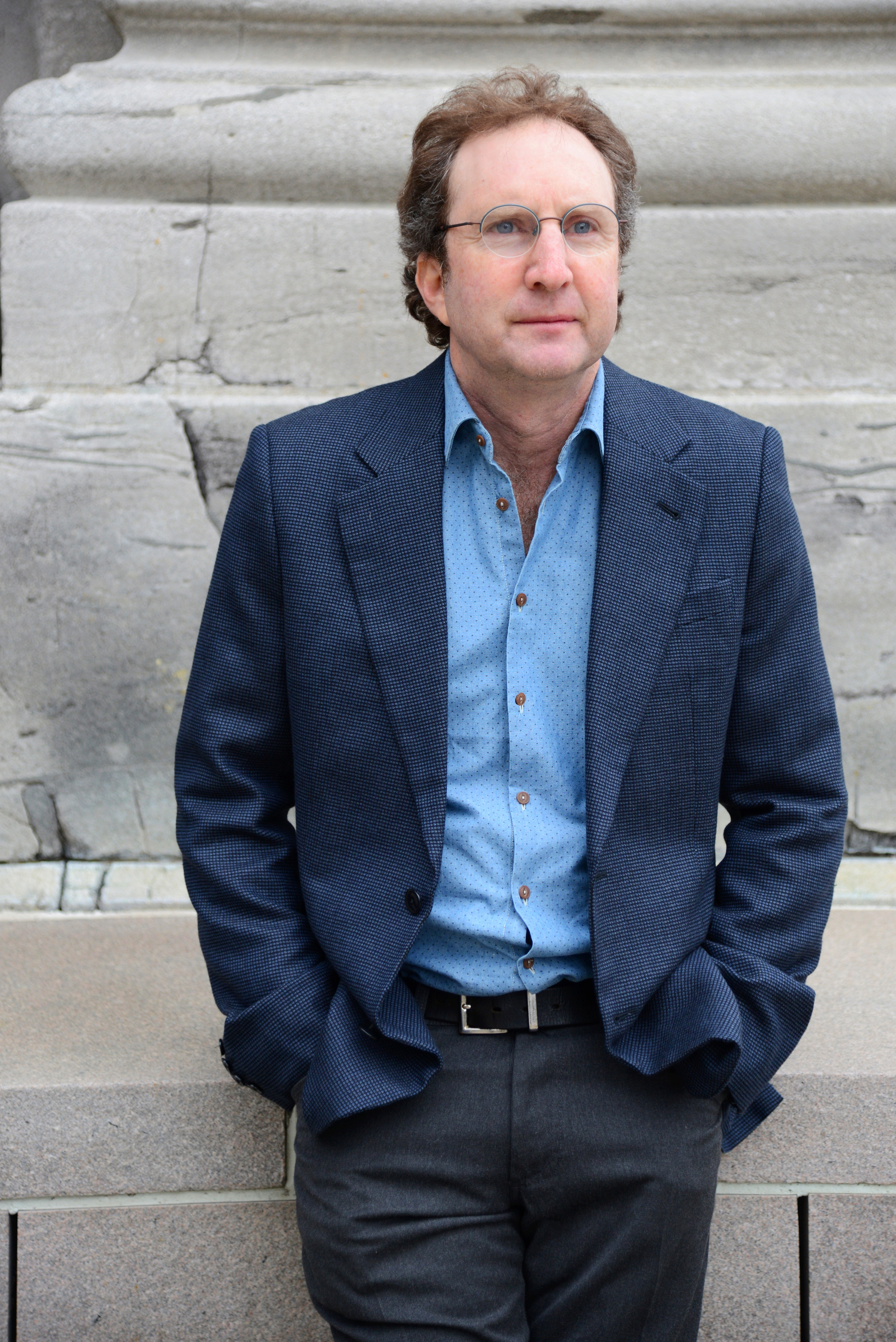
- Gelfand in 2012

Background information
- Born: April 3, 1959 (age 66); Montreal, Quebec, Canada
- Genres: Jazz, classical
- Occupation(s): Musician, composer, arranger
- Instrument(s): Piano, keyboards
- Years active: 1989–present

James Gelfand (born April 3, 1959) is a Canadian jazz pianist who has written scores for film and television.

== Early life ==
Gelfand was born in Montreal, Quebec, Canada into a large Jewish family. He is the great-grandson of Jacob Pascal, founder of J. Pascal's Hardware and Furniture. He is married with two children.

He began classical piano training at the age of four. During his teens, Gelfand diverged into jazz and other styles. Performing and competing at jazz festivals throughout North America and Europe, he has won a number of prestigious awards.

== Professional career ==
Gelfand recorded a number of cross-over albums combining jazz and classical styles. He has performed on over 40 albums, with 8 under his own name. During his earlier career, he established The James Gelfand Trio and The James Gelfand Group.

With his ability to compose in various styles such as techno, orchestral, folk, and jazz, Gelfand began writing score for film and television. He has composed the music for over 30 films and 300 television broadcasts.

== Discography ==
=== As leader or co-leader ===
- Neverland (CBC Records, 1988)
- Time Zones (Silence Records, 1996)
- Setting the Standard with Michel Donato (Unidisc, 1996)
- Children's Standards +1+2+3 (Lost Chart, 1998)
- Mother Tree (Effendi, 2002)
- Convergence (Unidisc, 2003)
- Exploding Sun (Kronos/Moviescore, 2013)
- Ground Midnight (Analekta, 2018)

=== As sideman or guest ===
With Michel Donato

- 1997 Live
- 2003 Setting the Standard Vol. 2

With Sylvain Gagnon

- 1991 Crepuscule
- 1997 Readers of the Lost Chart

With Jean-Pierre Zanella

- 1995 Caminho
- 1997 Mystic Infancy
- 1999 Puzzle City
- 2006 Villa-Lobos-Jobim

With others

- 1994 Hymn to the Earth, Sonny Greenwich
- 1995 Rhythm 'n' Jazz, Alain Caron
- 1996 Welcome: Mother Earth, Meantime
- 1998 A Time for Love, Charito
- 1998 Marin Nasturica & Friends, Marin Nasturica
- 1998 Tricycle, Helmut Lipsky
- 2000 Arthur's Perfect Christmas, Arthur
- 2001 Arthur's Really Rockin' Music Mix, Arthur & Friends

== Film and television ==
- Sous un Ciel Variable – 1995
- Virginie - 1996
- Max the Cat - 1996
- Investigating Tarzan - 1997
- Kit & Kaboodle - 1998
- The Country Mouse and the City Mouse Adventures - 1998
- Journey to the West – Legends of the Monkey King - 1999 (English version)
- Are You Afraid of the Dark? - 1999-2000
- The Orphan Muses (Les Muses orphelines) - 2000
- A Miss Mallard Mystery - 2000
- Sagwa, the Chinese Siamese Cat - 2001
- Wicked Minds - 2002
- Deadly Betrayal - 2002
- The Rendering - 2002
- Scent of Danger - 2002
- Silent Night - 2002
- Student Seduction - 2003
- Wicked Minds - 2003
- Wall of Secrets - 2003
- The Clinic - 2004
- Jack Paradise: Montreal by Night (Jack Paradise : Les nuits de Montréal) - 2004
- Fries with That? - 2004
- Pinocchio 3000 - 2004
- Baby for Sale - 2004
- False Pretenses - 2004
- Crimes of Passion - 2005
- Lies and Deception - 2005
- Forbidden Secrets - 2005
- Swarmed - 2005
- Flirting with Danger - 2006
- Black Widower - 2006
- Proof of Lies - 2006
- Thrill of the Kill - 2006
- Mind Over Murder - 2006
- Legacy of Fear - 2006
- Doctor*ology - 2007
- Housesitter - 2007
- Blind Trust - 2007
- A Life Interrupted - 2007
- St. Urbain's Horseman - 2007
- The Double Life of Eleanor Kendall - 2008
- Swamp Devil - 2008
- Secrets of the Summer House - 2008
- An Old Fashioned Thanksgiving - 2008
- Crusoe - 2009
- The Christmas Choir - 2008
- Hidden Crimes - 2009
- Final Verdict - 2009
- High Plains Invaders - 2009
- Killer Hair - 2009
- Perfect Plan - 2010
- The Night Before the Night Before Christmas - 2010
- The Mysteries of Alfred Hedgehog - 2010
- Web of Lies - 2009
- High Plains Invaders - 2009
- Naked Science - 2008-2009
- Hostile Makeover - 2009
- Cyberbully - 2011
- Desperately Seeking Santa - 2011
- Bullet in the Face - 2012
- Northpole - 2014

== Awards and honours ==
- 1989 Thelonious Monk International Piano Competition - Performed in Washington, DC in semifinals
- 1991 2nd Place The Great American Jazz Piano Competition Jacksonville Jazz Festival - International Competition
- 1992 ADISQ nomination - Arranger of the Year - Children's Standards
- 1992 Winner of the Montreal International Jazz Festival Competition (James Gelfand Trio)
- 1995 Juno Award - Best Contemporary Jazz Album - The Merlin Factor
- 1997 Juno nomination - Best Contemporary Jazz Album - Time Zones (James Gelfand Group)
- 1997 Keyboardist of the Year - Jazz Report Magazine Awards
- 1998 Keyboardist of the Year - Jazz Report Magazine Awards
- 1999 Keyboardist of the Year - Jazz Report Magazine Awards
- 2000 Keyboardist of the Year - Jazz Report Magazine Awards
- 2001 Jutra Award - Best Original Score - Les Muses Orphelines
- 2003 Gemini Award nomination - Best Dramatic Score - Silent Night
- 2005 Jutra nomination - Best Music - Jack Paradise (Les nuits de Montréal)
- 2005 SOCAN Award - International Television Series Music Award
- 2006 SOCAN Award - International Television Series Music Award
- 2007 SOCAN Award - International Film Series Music Award
- 2008 Gemini Award nomination - Best Original Music Score for a Dramatic Program, Mini-Series or TV Movie - St. Urbain's Horseman
