= Wumpa's World =

Canadian-Chinese television series

- Le monde de Wumpa
- Genre: Children's; Fantasy
- Created by: Steven Westren
- Narrated by: Lorne Cardinal (English)
- Countries of origin: Canada
- Original languages: English; French
- No. of seasons: 2
- No. of episodes: 52

Production
- Producers: Cité-Amérique
- Running time: 15 mins. (approx)

Original release
- Network: Treehouse TV; The Knowledge Channel; APTN; TFO; Télé-Québec
- Release: September 3, 2001 – May 2002

Wumpa's World (French: Le monde de Wumpa is a Canadian television series for children which first aired on many networks including Treehouse TV, The Knowledge Channel, APTN, TFO, and Télé-Québec, with 52 15-minute episodes from August 2001 to May 2002. The pilot episode aired in late 2000. Today, the show's episodes are only seen in reruns late during the night and earlier during the day. The characters are portrayed as puppets.

== Characters ==
- Wumpa (Lorne Cardinal) is a brown walrus who is a narrator that tells real-life stories which take place in the Arctic Circle. At the end of each show, Wumpa sings his very own "goodbye song" by playing a bass guitar that looks like a snowshoe. Most of the show's episodes end with Wumpa's goodbye song's most famous line, which is "Well, bye-bye, and don't forget, always keep your tusks shiny and your blubber clean". He only occasionally appears in the story itself.
- Zig and Zag are two young snowmobiles. Zig is yellow and pink, while Zag is blue and orange. A bicycle bell is mounted on Zig's handlebars and a horn is mounted on Zag's.
- Tiguak (Tim Gosley) is a polar bear who lives in an igloo and mostly eats fish. He has a bed and a toy bear he calls "Mr. Snoozers".
- Seeka (Jani Lauzon) and Tuk ; Julie Burroughs) are snow hares who live in a den with two entrances – one for each of them.
