= Spectacular Spas =

- Created by: Alan Stransman
- Starring: Carrie Olver
- Country of origin: Canada
- No. of episodes: 78

Production
- Running time: 30 minutes

Original release
- Network: Life Network
- Release: 1998 – present

Spectacular Spas is a Canadian television travel series about spa treatments from around the world.

The series began in 1998. Hosted by Carrie Olver, the programme mainly visits destination spas and day spas, and has been to many different world regions — including all around North America, as well as the Caribbean, Scandinavia, England, Central Europe and East Asia — in search of different sorts of treatments and experiences. It covers types of massage particular to a region (e.g., Swedish or Icelandic, which were both covered in one episode); areas with natural hot springs for bathing, different kinds of cuisine, alternative holistic treatments and materials thought to have healing qualities are also explored.

The mood of the programme is very relaxed, and its theme tune and incidental music are deliberately soothing, to reflect the subject matter. It has been shown worldwide since beginning on Canada's Life Network, to (among others) NDTV in India and You TV (now Sumo TV) in the UK.

The large amount of nudity on Spectacular Spas is not usually a problem for censors, since only Carrie Olver's back is exposed when she gets massaged, but You TV decided to cut out a sequence where she stripped off her towel in a river after having a mud bath.
