= Eugene Lion =

Eugene Lion

Eugene Lion (November 4, 1933 – April 21, 2013) was an American theater director, writer, and performance coach.

== Early life and training ==
Eugene Lion was born in Brooklyn, New York, during the Depression. His father, David Lion, was the estranged brother of entertainer Eddie Cantor. Cantor refused to acknowledge the Lions as family because of David Lion's association with communists. Eugene was named after prominent socialist, trade unionist, and leftist presidential candidate Eugene Debs.

Lion's first interest in the arts was in photography. He was for a time assistant to the New York photographer Weegee. Lion graduated in painting from Cooper Union in New York. His primary theatre teachers were Tamara Daykarhanova in acting and Merle Marsicano in dance. Kabuki was a major influence on his later work.

== Directing ==
Lion was the first North American to direct at The Abbey Theatre, Ireland's national theatre, staging its commemorative production of Samuel Beckett's Waiting for Godot in 1976, which gained notice for "an entirely fresh, deeply imaginative approach....Lion has brought new meaning to the play -- and much new humour". In 1978 he directed their production of Arthur Miller's The Crucible, which was praised as "a powerful, unfussy presentation, masterly in its groupings and getting from a dedicated cast acting of unusual strength and intensity."

He was associate director of the Guthrie Theater in Minneapolis (1974–76), where he directed Waiting for Godot and Brecht's Mother Courage.

He was founding artistic director of Guthrie 2, the Guthrie's alternative and experimental stage (1975–76), where his direction of an adaptation of Michael Ondaatje's The Collected Works of Billy the Kid was acknowledged to be "one of the most exhilarating evenings of theater in the Twin Cities in a long while!". Conceived by Lion as an experimental alternative theatre to the Mainstage, Guthrie 2 was dedicated to the production of living playwrights. Its resident repertory company, which included John Pielmeier, its apprentice program and its international network of alternative theatres came to an end when Lion's tenure was terminated by its parent, The Guthrie Theater, which lead to a lawsuit and an acrimonious parting of ways. The late-night series of productions by local independent theatre groups continued at the Southern Theater, which took over the facility.

Lion then became artistic director of the Hawaii Public Theater (1977–79), where he directed Peter Weiss's Marat/Sade (1978), Jean Genet's The Maids, in two versions (1978) and Alexander Ostrovsky 's The Fools! (1977).

Lion staged and wrote works for Canada's Theatre Beyond Words which were performed in 1985 at the Pushkin Theatre in Moscow; he directed Pielmeier's Agnes of God at Dublin's Gate Theatre(1984), Dürrenmatt's The Physicists at the Advent Theatre in Nashville (1979), and Samuel Beckett's Endgame at Ottawa's National Arts Centre (1989).

== The 1960s ==
In 1960, Lion adapted and directed Ugo Betti's The Burnt Flowerbed for Broadway. In the cast were Eric Portman and Gloria Vanderbilt. Off-Broadway in the 60's, he directed Jaques Audiberti 's The Chinabird, Michel de Ghelderode's Women at the Tomb and Escurial, Robert Hellman's Kling, and Saint Joan by George Bernard Shaw; in Berlin, he directed Bertolt Brecht's Mann ist Mann and Arturo Ui at the Berliner Ensemble (1969).

During the Vietnam War, Lion became deeply involved with the anti-war movement and served as artistic director and agent provocateur of New York's Washington Square Methodist Episcopal Church (1967–1970), which gave sanctuary to that war's first draft resisters. He directed the church's 1967 Christmas celebration condemning the war, which was broadcast nationwide. Under the leadership of Lion and the Rev. Finley Schaef, the church provided a home for insurgent theatre companies such as Jerzy Grotowski's Polish Lab and the Bread and Puppet Theatre, as well as the Greenwich Village Peace Center with Karl Bissinger, and an Ecology Center. In 1968, the Lutheran Film Associates (LFA) produced a feature-length documentary, entitled Acts, about Eugene Lion and Rev. Finley Schaef, the churchʹs pastor. The film was directed by William Jersey, whose 1967 film A Time for Burning was nominated for an Oscar.

== Collaboration ==
Paralleling Lion's independent work was a lifelong collaboration with his wife, dancer-actor Jo Lechay. Together they developed experimental performance techniques which became the foundation of Lion's Techniques of Authenticity. In Honolulu and Montreal, Lion was Co-Artistic Director of the Jo Lechay Dance Company (La compagnie danse Jo Lechay) for which he choreographed and designed costumes, sets, and lights. He also served as performance coach and grant-writer. The company toured Canada, Europe and the United States during the years 1982–1986.

In 1986 the work shifted to producing and touring one-woman multidisciplinary shows written and directed by Lion and performed by Lechay. Affamée (1989) asked the question "How does one justify being an artist when the world is in such crisis?" and was described as "enough to scar the memory"; Absolute Zero/Zéro Absolu (1991) about an aging showgirl 50 years in the future where the world is running out of water, ozone and global solutions, was called "an absolute triumph"; and Out of the Blue (1997), with dancer Paul-André Fortier, was a cross-dressing 'romance for dancers,' described as "superb".

Lion and Lechay also had two children: independent videographer and professor of media Jenny Lion, and Angel (formerly Anikke) Lion.

== Teacher, translator, writer ==
Eugene Lion became a popular teacher–especially during the 1980 – 2002 years he spent in Montreal–of performance techniques known as Techniques of Authenticity. His workshops and private coaching influenced artists of many disciplines: actors, dancers, vocal and instrumental musicians, painters and designers, including François Cervantes, director of the theatre company L'Entreprise, in Marseille, France, who is preparing a book on Lion's technique. The work emphasizes heightened focus through pertinent specific, singular and compelling intention.

Lion was on the faculty of the University of Iowa Theatre Department and the Center for New Performing Arts (1972–75), where he directed an Elizabethan play, Woodstock, also called I Richard II, on roller skates (1973). He also taught acting at Montreal's Dawson College (1980–82) and costume design at the National Theatre School, also in Montreal (1984–86).

Lion wrote subversive comedies, including Sammy's Follies, produced on Hornby Island in 1995 and Chrysanthemum, produced at Montreal's Théâtre d'Aujourd'hui in 1997 as well as three one-woman shows for his partner, Jo Lechay. He also wrote Shakespearean criticism, in particular, an unpublished analysis of Hamlet, which sees Hamlet as an unfulfilled artist/harlequin trapped in a militaristic world.

Lion's produced translations and adaptations are Betti's The Burnt Flowerbed and Queen and the Rebels, Frisch's The Firebugs, Genet's The Maids, Ghelderode's Christopher Columbus and Women at the Tomb, as well as Ostrovsky's Fools!.

== Holocaust drama ==
Sammy's Follies was produced by the New Theatre Workshop, NY, in 1970, the Playwrights Workshop, Montreal in 1994 and the Hornby Island Theatre Society in British Columbia in 1995. The play has been connected to Holocaust Drama: "Yet the most important change among the second- and third-generation playwrights, aside from the dramatization of stories about the children and grandchildren of Holocaust victims, has been the proliferation of plays that produce theatrical effects through comedy, once thought to be demeaning or destructive to the telling of an exclusively tragic Holocaust experience. Peter Barnes's Laughter (1978), Joan Schenkar's The Last of Hitler (1982), Roy Kift's Camp Comedy (1996), and Eugene Lion's Sammy's Follies (2006) all use humor to make the performances of their plays more transgressive of conventional theatrical forms and ethical assumptions."

Lion, however, insisted that Sammy's Follies was not about Auschwitz or the Holocaust; the reference is a metaphor for our indifference to current and ongoing atrocities. In a letter to colleague Michel Garneau dated September 23, 1988, he states, "The goad here is not an historical holocaust, but the ones occurring now. The hope? That when audiences, myself included, look into the mirror of Sammy & Co, the inescapable resemblances will irritate--provoke--move us past any possibility of indifference."

== Archives ==
Eugene Lion's archives are preserved in the Performing Arts Archives at the University of Minnesota Libraries, including many of his original photographs taken in New York and Mexico, and documentation on the lawsuit that followed his dismissal from Guthrie 2 in 1976.
