= The Toy Castle =

- Le Château magique
- Genre: Supernatural; Fantasy; Slice of life
- Created by: Katherine Jeans and David Langer
- Based on: The Steadfast Tin Soldier by Hans Christian Andersen
- Developed by: Sound Venture Productions
- Written by: Nancy Trites-Botkin; Rick Jones; Timothy Spain; Mike Laewen; Marc Charbonneau
- Directed by: Katherine Jeans and David Langer
- Narrated by: Rick Jones and Marc Charbonneau
- Composer: Andrew Huggett
- Country of origin: Canada
- Original languages: English; French
- No. of seasons: 3 + 1 pilot
- No. of episodes: 65 + 1 pilot

Production
- Producer: Neil Bregman
- Production locations: Winnipeg, Manitoba, Canada
- Editors: Cheryl Gadoury; Kevin Kocvar
- Running time: 22 minutes
- Production company: Sound Venture Productions

Original release
- Network: Treehouse TV (Canada English); SCN (Canada English); Access (Canada English seasons 2-3); Knowledge Network (Canada English seasons 2-3); TVOntario (Canada English season 3); TFO (Canada French); TQS (Canada French)
- Release: 1992
- Release: 4 September 2000 – 26 December 2003

The Toy Castle (French: Le Château magique) is a Canadian children's television show that aired on Treehouse TV, SCN, Access, Knowledge Network, TVOntario and TFO. It was aired from September 4, 2000 to December 26, 2003 and produced by Sound Venture Productions. It was inspired by Sound Venture's 1992 Christmas ballet special The Steadfast Tin Soldier, which starred Frank Augustyn and was based on Hans Christian Andersen's fairy tale. It is now shown during the Christmas season on Treehouse, TFO and Noovo. Told through ballet and narration, the stories are about a group of toys in a toy castle that magically come to life when the children are asleep. This series won a Gemini Award in 2003 for "Best Preschool Series."

The series also aired on public television stations in the United States, JimJam in Italy, TF1, France 3, M6 and Piwi+ in France and was rerun in French on TQS. It was distributed worldwide by France Télévisions.

== Premise ==
The Toy Castle is a show about a group of toys that magically come to life when their children are asleep. When the children are about to wake up, the toys dash around fast until they are back in their former positions. Each episode consists of three story lines, in which the toys all dance around the castle and get into situations which the viewer may relate to.

== Characters ==
- The Soldier (Jorden Morris) enjoys marching and dancing, and loves the lovely Ballerina. Judging by his accent, he is of British nationality (French nationality in the French-language version).
- The Ballerina (Elizabeth Olds) enjoys dancing and loves the soldier. Judging by her accent, she is of French nationality (British nationality in the French-language version). She is best friends with China Doll and Rag Doll.
- The China Doll (Jennifer Welsman) enjoys dancing and drinking tea. She is shy and prefers quiet activities. She is best friends with Ballerina and Rag Doll.
- The Clown (Keir Knight) is a loud and wild toy. He likes joking around and playing. His best friends are Goblin and Rag Doll.
- The Goblin (Yosuke Mino) enjoys playing pranks on people and teasing. His best friends are Rag Doll and Clown.
- The Rag Doll (Sayaka Karasugi) enjoys twirling and playing. She dreams of being a pretty lady like Ballerina and China Doll. Her best friends are Goblin, Clown, Ballerina and China Doll.
- The Sailor (Raven S. Wilder) likes to tell tales and sail the seven seas. His favorite dance is the jig.
- The Strong Man (David Lucas) likes lifting weights and his stuffed cat, Meow Meow. He may be in love with China Doll, as they dated in one episode, but that was the only time it was shown.
- Fredrick (Sofia Costantini) enjoys dancing the frog-a-doddle-five and playing with his twin sister, Freida. He speaks with a Southern accent (Meridional accent in the French version).
- Freida (Ashley Barker) enjoys dancing the frog-a-doddle-five and playing with her twin brother, Fredrick. She speaks with a Southern accent (Meridional accent in the French version).
- Papa Mouse (Micheal Flynn) is a caring man. He and his wife have three children.
- Mama Mouse (Daiva Preston, Andrea Mislan) is shy. She is married to Papa Mouse, and has three children.
- Little Mouse (Corinne Vessey) likes playing and imagining he is riding a horse. He was named Baby Mouse in the first season, but with two new siblings coming, they quietly changed his name to Little Mouse.
- The Mouse Twins - They are twins who both cry often. They enjoy quiet things and swinging. They have never been given official names, being referred to simply as 'The Mouse Twins'.
- The Dolly Bird (Sofia Costantini) wears extravagant make-up and loves dancing for people. She tends to be insecure about her dancing. She has appeared in the fewest episodes and is never mentioned on the official site.
- The Little Boy (Billy Jeans) sleeps in his bed while the toys are dancing and in motion, but when he turns his head around sleeping, the toys return to their former poses as regular figures. He is only shown in the series' opening, in the ending part of an episode, and in the credits background.
- The Little Girl (Ivy Bregman) sleeps in her bed while the toys are dancing and in motion, but when she turns her head around sleeping, the toys return to their former poses as regular figures. She is only shown in the series' opening, in the ending part of an episode, and in the credits background.

== Episodes ==
=== Pilot (1992) ===
No.	Title	Directed by	Written by	Original release date	French airdate	Prod. code	French viewers (millions)
Pilot	"The Tin Soldier"	Katherine Jeans and David Langer	Rick Jones and Marc Charbonneau	December 1992	December 1992	100	TBD

=== Season 1 (2000) ===
No.	Title	Directed by	Written by	Original release date	French airdate	Prod. code	French viewers (millions)
1	"Cinderella"	Katherine Jeans	Rick Jones	September 4, 2000	TBA	101	N/A
1	"Duck, Duck, Goose"	Katherine Jeans	Rick Jones	September 4, 2000	TBA	101	N/A
1	"Cake Walk"	Katherine Jeans	Rick Jones	September 4, 2000	TBA	101	N/A
2	"A Ragdoll's Gift"	Katherine Jeans	Nancy Trites-Botkin	September 9, 2000	TBA	102	N/A
2	"A Party for One"	Katherine Jeans	Nancy Trites-Botkin	September 9, 2000	TBA	102	N/A
2	"I'm the Boss"	Katherine Jeans	Nancy Trites-Botkin	September 9, 2000	TBA	102	N/A
3	"A Frog is a Frog"	Katherine Jeans	Nancy Trites-Botkin	September 10, 2000	TBA	103	N/A
3	"Sailor's Delight"	Katherine Jeans	Nancy Trites-Botkin	September 10, 2000	TBA	103	N/A
3	"Goldilocks"	Katherine Jeans	Nancy Trites-Botkin	September 10, 2000	TBA	103	N/A
4	"London Bridge's Falling Down"	Katherine Jeans	Nancy Trites-Botkin	September 11, 2000	TBA	104	N/A
4	"Pirate Pshaw"	Katherine Jeans	Nancy Trites-Botkin	September 11, 2000	TBA	104	N/A
4	"Bubble Ballet"	Katherine Jeans	Nancy Trites-Botkin	September 11, 2000	TBA	104	N/A
5	"Itsy Bitsy Spider"	Katherine Jeans	Timothy Spain	September 16, 2000	TBA	105	N/A
5	"Bluebird"	Katherine Jeans	Timothy Spain	September 16, 2000	TBA	105	N/A
5	"Strong Not Strong"	Katherine Jeans	Timothy Spain	September 16, 2000	TBA	105	N/A
6	"Spring Junk Band"	Katherine Jeans	Rick Jones	September 17, 2000	TBA	106	N/A
6	"Funny Man"	Katherine Jeans	Rick Jones	September 17, 2000	TBA	106	N/A
6	"Camp Out"	Katherine Jeans	Rick Jones	September 17, 2000	TBA	106	N/A
7	"Poor Invisible Me"	Katherine Jeans	Timothy Spain	September 18, 2000	TBA	107	N/A
7	"Cricklecrack Thoozelah"	Katherine Jeans	Timothy Spain	September 18, 2000	TBA	107	N/A
7	"Mary Had a Little Lamb"	Katherine Jeans	Timothy Spain	September 18, 2000	TBA	107	N/A
8	"Private Rag Doll"	Katherine Jeans	Nancy Trites-Botkin	September 23, 2000	TBA	108	N/A
8	"Cirque de Ballet"	Katherine Jeans	Nancy Trites-Botkin	September 23, 2000	TBA	108	N/A
8	"Lost My Head"	Katherine Jeans	Nancy Trites-Botkin	September 23, 2000	TBA	108	N/A
9	"Be My Valentine"	Katherine Jeans	Nancy Trites-Botkin	2001	TBA	109	TBD
9	"Best Friend Ballet"	Katherine Jeans	Nancy Trites-Botkin	2001	TBA	109	TBD
9	"Perhaps Forever"	Katherine Jeans	Nancy Trites-Botkin	2001	TBA	109	TBD
10	"Angel Wings"	Katherine Jeans	Nancy Trites-Botkin	September 25, 2000	TBA	110	N/A
10	"Copy Cat"	Katherine Jeans	Nancy Trites-Botkin	September 25, 2000	TBA	110	N/A
10	"Three Cool Pigs"	Katherine Jeans	Nancy Trites-Botkin	September 25, 2000	TBA	110	N/A
11	"Sugar Plums Fairly"	Katherine Jeans	Timothy Spain	September 30, 2000	TBA	111	N/A
11	"Alone Not Lonely"	Katherine Jeans	Timothy Spain	September 30, 2000	TBA	111	N/A
11	"Blunder Bluff"	Katherine Jeans	Timothy Spain	September 30, 2000	TBA	111	N/A
12	"Bo Bo's"	Katherine Jeans	Timothy Spain	2001	TBA	112	TBD
12	"Dance With Me"	Katherine Jeans	Timothy Spain	2001	TBA	112	TBD
12	"Hide and Seek"	Katherine Jeans	Timothy Spain	2001	TBA	112	TBD
13	"Little Miss Muffett"	Katherine Jeans	Rick Jones	2001	TBA	113	TBD
13	"Little Frog"	Katherine Jeans	Rick Jones	2001	TBA	113	TBD
13	"Musical Chairs"	Katherine Jeans	Rick Jones	2001	TBA	113	TBD
14	"Perfectly Perfect Party"	Katherine Jeans	Mike Laewen	2001	TBA	114	TBD
14	"Tea Calamity"	Katherine Jeans	Mike Laewen	2001	TBA	114	TBD
14	"Pick a Picnic"	Katherine Jeans	Mike Laewen	2001	TBA	114	TBD
15	"Tea Party"	Katherine Jeans	Nancy Trites-Botkin	2001	TBA	115	TBD
15	"Waltz for Three"	Katherine Jeans	Nancy Trites-Botkin	2001	TBA	115	TBD
15	"Phish Phobia"	Katherine Jeans	Nancy Trites-Botkin	2001	TBA	115	TBD
16	"Twinkle Twinkle"	Katherine Jeans	Nancy Trites-Botkin	2001	TBA	116	TBD
16	"She Shoots She Scores"	Katherine Jeans	Nancy Trites-Botkin	2001	TBA	116	TBD
16	"Just Say No"	Katherine Jeans	Nancy Trites-Botkin	2001	TBA	116	TBD
17	"The Pied Piper of Glum"	Katherine Jeans	Timothy Spain	2001	TBA	117	TBD
17	"Anything You Can Do..."	Katherine Jeans	Timothy Spain	2001	TBA	117	TBD
17	"Giggle Girl"	Katherine Jeans	Timothy Spain	2001	TBA	117	TBD
18	"Nutcracker Sweet"	Katherine Jeans	Timothy Spain	2001	TBA	118	TBD
18	"Twelve Days of Christmas"	Katherine Jeans	Timothy Spain	2001	TBA	118	TBD
18	"Season of Lights"	Katherine Jeans	Timothy Spain	2001	TBA	118	TBD

== See also ==
- List of Christmas films
