= Transformers: Energon =

Television series

- North American DVD cover, depicting Optimus Prime in his super mode

トランスフォーマー スーパーリンク (Toransufōmā Sūpārinku)
- Genre: Adventure, mecha
- Created by: Eugene Ishikawa; Steve Drucker
- Anime television series
- Directed by: Yutaka Satō (#1–13); Jun Kawagoe (#1–13); Takashi Sano (#14–51)
- Produced by: Fukashi Azuma; Matsuo Sugiyama
- Written by: Akira Okeya
- Music by: Kazunori Maruyama
- Studio: Actas; Studio A-Cat
- Licensed by: EU: Entertainment Rights (2004-2009); NA: Hasbro
- Original network: TXN (TV Tokyo)
- English network: AU: Network Ten; CA: YTV; IE: RTE Two; IN: Cartoon Network; NZ: TV2; UK: Toonami, CITV; US: Cartoon Network (Toonami), KidsClick; ZA: SABC2
- Original run: January 9, 2004 – December 24, 2004
- Episodes: 51

Transformers: Energon, known in Japan as Transformers: Superlink (トランスフォーマー スーパーリンク), is a Japanese anime series which debuted on January 9, 2004. It is a direct sequel to Transformers: Armada. It is also the first Japanese Transformers show where the Transformers are computer-generated (CG), in a cel-shaded technique similar to the Zoids anime, which was a trend that would continue into the next series, Transformers: Cybertron.

In the United States, KidsClick started airing reruns of the show from August 27, 2018, until November 3, 2018. Along with Transformers: Armada and Transformers: Cybertron, Transformers: Energon is a part of a saga in the Transformers series known as the "Unicron Trilogy".

In this series, the Transformers' primary gimmicks are the Autobots' ability to combine with partners of the same size, the Decepticons' ability to use powered up forms, and the addition of Energon weapons and stars that can be placed on any Transformer. Mini-Cons, from the previous line, are still present, but all Mini-Con pegs are "dummy" pegs as they do not activate a function on the toy.

== Plot ==
Ten years after the war for the Mini-Cons and the apparent destruction of Unicron and the disappearance of the Decepticon leader Megatron, the mysterious Alpha Q (which stands for "Quintesson"), operating out of the husk of the planet-eater's body, releases energy-eating Terrorcons to attack the Autobots' Cybertron Cities in the Solar System, gathering Energon for Alpha Q's plan. As the Autobots mobilize against the new threat alongside their human allies (including the teenager Kicker), Alpha Q creates Scorponok to lead the Terrorcons and forges a sword from the Spark of the Megatron (whose corpse lies within Unicron), later known as Galvatron, in order to turn the other Decepticons on Earth to his side. Megatron engineers his own resurrection, however, taking control of Unicron's body and forcing Alpha Q to flee inside Unicron's head, then attacking Ocean City on Earth. Alpha Q recreates Starscream to assassinate Optimus Prime, but Starscream is brainwashed into Megatron's service, all along Scorponok continues to act as Alpha Q's mole within the Decepticons. Meanwhile, as the Autobots begin construction of Energon Towers to protect the Earth, the legendary figure from Cybertron history known as Rodimus makes his reappearance.

With the activation of Earth's new Energon Grid, shielding it from attack by the Decepticons, the Autobots turn their attention to Unicron. Leaving Earth in the ship, the Miranda II, they locate Unicron's body. Megatron mobilizes the chaos-bringer, and pursues the Autobots through their space bridge, emerging in the vicinity of Cybertron. The Transformers' homeworld riddled with Energon towers, fired, leaving Unicron badly damaged. The Autobots form an alliance with Alpha Q, who is already working with Rodimus and his crew, and learn his origin and his motives for stealing Energon: he seeks to use it to recreate that which Unicron has destroyed. Meanwhile, Megatron's forces attack Cybertron, and the Decepticon criminal Shockblast is inducted into their ranks. In the course of Shockblast's escape from prison, guard Wing Dagger swears revenge for the death of his partner, Padlock, and when an Energon tower collapses on him and Tidal Wave, Megatron reconstructs his minion as Mirage, while Primus recreates Wing Dagger as the mighty Wing Saber, who joins the battle alongside Optimus Prime within Unicron. As the battle rages, Kicker arranges to channel all of Earth's Energon into Unicron's head, which Alpha Q then rams into Unicron's body. The resultant reaction with the negatively charged Energon within the body causes a fissure in reality, through which all the combatants are sucked.

In the new region of space on the other side of the fissure, Alpha Q has successfully recreated all the worlds destroyed by Unicron, sustaining them from within Unicron's head, which has now become an Energon sun. The Autobots set about establishing Energon Towers on the new planets to protect them, while Megatron sees the new worlds as a source of more Energon to reactivate Unicron. Having brainwashed Scorponok to become fully loyal to him, Megatron attempts to do the same to Inferno, but he fights the process. A rescue team consisting of Cliffjumper, Downshift, and Bulkhead is dispatched from Cybertron and Earth and teams up with the Autobots to protect the new worlds, but Inferno is then destroyed when he falls into the Energon sun, defeating the Decepticon influence of Megatron. Thankfully, his Spark is saved and he is reborn as Roadblock, just as the ancient Autobot, Omega Supreme, is awakened on Cybertron and joins the Autobots. Megatron succeeds in animating Unicron, who reclaims his head, killing Alpha Q in the process, but then Shockblast attempts to seize control of Unicron, only to have his own mind taken over by the "demi-god", ultimately destroying him. Megatron then resumes control, but falls prey to Unicron's influence as well, as the two minds battle for control as they struggle with Optimus Supreme, the combined form of Optimus Prime and Omega Supreme. Optimus Supreme is enlarged to giant size with a power boost from Primus which also energises several of the other Autobots. In a veritable battle of the titans, Optimus Supreme destroys Unicron, but his mind lives on within Megatron.

Although many of the Decepticons are captured and imprisoned on Cybertron, Megatron and his remaining forces soon attack the planet and free them. Another fugitive is Shockblast's younger brother, Sixshot, who joins Megatron's team to get revenge on Optimus Prime for his brother's death. Guided by Unicron's consciousness, Megatron is led to a subterranean reservoir of Super Energon, which transforms him into Galvatron. Two of the Super Energon's guardians, Bruticus Maximus and Constructicon Maximus, awake from stasis and side with him, but the third, Superion Maximus, sides with the Autobots. In the ensuing battle, the rupture of several Energon Towers sees a blanket of damaging Energon gas coat Cybertron's surface, keeping the Autobots trapped off the planet, forcing them to send in Kicker and the Omnicons to stop the gas flow while Galvatron seizes control of the planet and directs its movement back to Alpha Q's region of space. In a multi-pronged attack, the Autobots turn the tables, but Galvatron then immerses himself in the Super Energon again, growing to a colossal size, as Unicron's mind once again takes over his own and directs him into space to merge with his Spark, still intact in the void. Optimus Prime grows to gigantic size also and forces Galvatron into a battle, bringing his consciousness back to the surface, at which point Prime drains Unicron's essence from his body. Galvatron then seeks to destroy Unicron's spark, but is possessed by it, while all of the Autobots combine their Sparks of Combination with Optimus Prime, reviving him and leading into the final battle with Unicron, which is promptly aborted when Galvatron takes control of his body again and plunges himself into the foundling sun created by Primus from the Super Energon, preferring to die than to be manipulated. With this action, the sun ignites, breathing new life into Alpha Q's worlds, lighting the way to a brighter tomorrow.

== Characters ==
=== Autobots ===
- Optimus Prime (voiced by Garry Chalk) is the head of an elite Autobot squadron, teaching the martial art of Kumite. His vehicle mode's trailer houses the Prime Force, a team of drones, which he combines with to assume Super Mode. He can combine with Wing Saber to assume Sonic Wing Mode and Omega Supreme to form Optimus Supreme.
- Jetfire (voiced by Scott McNeil) is wisecracking on and off the battlefield, but unwaveringly serious in his duties despite any outward appearance to the contrary. He transforms into a spacecraft. In addition, Jetfire can use the Spark of Combination to link with other Transformers, most commonly Ironhide.
- Hot Shot (voiced by Brent Miller) is Ironhide's mentor. He looked up to Rodimus until he found out Rodimus was working for Alpha Q. Hot Shot transforms into a sports car, resembling an Aston Martin Vanquish.
- Inferno/Roadblock (voiced by Michael Daingerfield) works for Optimus Prime in knowledge-based work, such as acting in science or managing the space bridge system. After sacrificing his life to save Starscream from being destroyed by the Energon Sun, Inferno's Spark is salvaged and he is reborn as Roadblock. He transforms into a fire truck as Inferno and into a crane truck as Roadblock.
- Ironhide (voiced by Matt Hill) is a young bot on Team Prime who looks up to Hot Shot. He is able to powerlink with Jetfire and has developed a relationship with Scorponok. Ironhide transforms into a modified Toyota Land Cruiser.
- Rodimus (voiced by Paul Dobson) is an Autobot leader with a different philosophy from Optimus, which puts the two at odds. Rodimus wanted to recreate Alpha Q's solar system at any cost, but after he learned it was a bad idea, he became Optimus Prime's right-hand. He transforms into a cybertronian race truck.
- Prowl (voiced by Alistair Abell) is an Autobot who works for Rodimus. He transforms into a Cybertronian F1-style police car.
- Landmine (voiced by Ward Perry) is an Autobot allied with Rodimus. Landmine taught Optimus how to fight (as mentioned in Cybertron) before he joined Rodimus. He transforms into a Cybertronian half-track battlefield recovery vehicle - he is able to separate from a portion of his vehicle mode, which assumes a special stationary attack mode.
- Wing Dagger (voiced by Colin Murdock) is an Autobot prison officer who was on duty when Shockblast escaped, and who attempted to recapture him with his partner Padlock only for Shockblast to murder his partner. Wing Dagger becomes determined to bring Shockblast to justice, but is critically injured in a subsequent encounter and rebuilt as Wing Saber. He transforms into a Cybertronian stealth bomber.
- Bulkhead (voiced by French Tickner) is an Autobot elder who can transform into a helicopter. He can combine with his vehicle mode's special weapon-supplying extension-purposed drone to assume 'Brute Mode'.
- Cliffjumper (voiced by Doron Bell) is part of Bulkhead's group. He transforms into a baja-styled dune buggy. In the English version, his name was swapped with Downshift for the first episodes of his and Downshift's appearances before this is rectified in their later appearances.
- Downshift (voiced by Ty Olsson) is part of Bulkhead's group. He transforms into a sports car. Often in the English, his name was swapped with Cliffjumper for the first episodes of his and Cliffjumper's appearances before this is rectified in their later appearances.
- Omega Supreme (voiced by Scott McNeil) is an ancient Autobot who defeated Unicron before the events of Armada. He can transform into a Cybertronian battleship, Cybertronian construction vehicle, Cybertronian crane platform, Cybertronian turret platform and a special single file line-up formation.
- Superion Maximus (voiced by Paul Dobson) is a composite Autobot who guarded Super Energon, and the only one who joined Optimus instead of Megatron since Megatron destroyed his inert unnamed brother. His components are:
  - Storm Jet - A Lockheed SR-71 Blackbird spy plane who forms Superion Maximus' head and torso. He is the single dominant consciousness of Superion Maximus.
  - Sky Shadow - A Fairchild Republic A-10 Thunderbolt II who forms Superion Maximus' right leg.
  - Terradive - A Fairchild Republic A-10 Thunderbolt II who forms Superion Maximus' left arm.
  - Treadshot - A Lockheed Martin F-22 Raptor who forms Superion Maximus' right arm.
  - Windrazor - A Lockheed Martin F-22 Raptor who forms Superior Maximus' left leg.

==== Omnicrons ====
The Omnicons were created to process raw Energon which other Transformers can't touch.

- Arcee (voiced by Sharon Alexander) is an Omnicron who can transform into a motorcycle. Kicker uses Arcee's vehicle mode of as a mode of transportation.
- Strongarm (voiced by Scott McNeil) is an Omnicron who can transform into a Cybertronian jeep. He wields an Energon axe.
- Signal Flare (voiced by Michael Dobson) is an Omnicron who can transform into a half-track Maser tank. His left arm is equipped with an Energon sawblade.
- Skyblast (voiced by Terry Klassen) is an Omnicron who can transform into a jet. His jet form's fins can be attached to his firearm, forming a bladed lance or staff.

=== Decepticons ===
- Megatron (voiced by David Kaye) is a leading member of the Decepticons who can transform into a fighter jet. His body was infused with Unicron's tissue, forming a protective casing so he could make a new body from inside.
- Cyclonus / Snow Cat (voiced by Don Brown) is a Decepticon who was forced into working for Megatron after Alpha Q decided to revive the Decepticons. Megatron later transformed him into Snow Cat. Cyclonus's alt mode is a helicopter. As Snow Cat, he transforms into a snow vehicle.
- Demolishor (voiced by Alvin Sanders) previously had loyalty issues to the Autobots and Decepticons. He officially returned to the Decepticons following Megatron's revival. After Demolishor's body was destroyed, Megatron brought him back in a new body with diminished intelligence that can transform into a dump truck.
- Starscream (voiced by Michael Dobson) was previously killed in Armada. Following his death, Alpha Q resurrected Starscream to assassinate Megatron and Optimus Prime and tortured him into becoming a Decepticon again. Starscream transforms into a fighter jet resembling a Lockheed Martin F-22 Raptor.
- Tidal Wave / Mirage (voiced by Doug Parker) was on put on the lunar base by the Autobots to protect a lunar colony. He was later crushed by a Energon tower, after which, Megatron had him brought back to Unicron for him to be prepared. Tidal Wave was converted into Mirage who can transform into an electric speeder seacraft.
- Shockblast (voiced by Brian Drummond) is a former ally of Tidal Wave who is snarky, ambitious, and triggerhappy. He transforms into a Cybertronian laser tank and a satellite cannon that also acts as a flying vehicle. Shockblast was later killed by Megatron controlling Unicron's body prior to the destruction of Blizzard Planet.
- Six Shot (voiced by Terry Klassen) is Shockblast's younger brother who is willing to take advantage of anything to get his way which leads to him getting beaten up by Galvatron. He isn't ferocious, like his brother, but formidable in his own right. Six Shot was later killed by Galvatron for disobeying him for the last time.
- Construction Maximus (voiced by Don Brown) is a composite Decepticon who guarded Super Energon before siding with Megatron. Both he and Bruticus Maximus were killed by Superion Maximus.
  - Steamhammer - A steam shovel who forms Constructicon Maximus' head and torso. He is the leader of the components and the dominant consciousness of Constructicon Maximus.
  - Bonecrusher - A loader who forms Constructicon Maximus' left leg.
  - Duststorm - A mobile crane who forms Constructicon Maximus' left arm.
  - Sledge (Scrapper) - A loader who forms Constructicon Maximus' right arm.
  - Wideload (Glen) - A mobile crane who can form Constructicon Maximus' right leg.
- Bruticus Maximus (voiced by Trevor Devall) is a composite Decepticon who guarded Super Energon before siding with Megatron. Both he and Constructicon Maximus were killed by Superion Maximus.
  - Barricade - An eight-wheeled armoured personnel carrier with a rear missile rack who forms Bruticus Maximus' head and torso. He is the leader of the components and is the dominant consciousness of Bruticus Maximus
  - Blackout - A Bell AH-1 Cobra helicopter who forms Bruticus Maximus' left arm.
  - Blight - An anti-aircraft tank who forms Bruticus Maximus' right arm.
  - Kickback - An anti-aircraft tank who forms Bruticus Maximus' left leg.
  - Stormcloud - A Bell AH-1 Cobra helicopter who forms Bruticus Maximus' right leg.

=== Terrorcons ===
The Terrorcons are Transformers from the Planet Q. When Alpha Q ends up inside Unicron, he uses his powers to recreate the Terrorcons, whose weaker members are used as foot soldiers. When Megatron is revived, he takes control of most of the Terrorcons.

- Scorponok (voiced by Colin Murdock) was Planet Q's prime minister until he gave up his life to detonate the planet inside Unicron. Alpha Q revived him with the spark of a deceased, ancient Decepticon, whose programming was reawakened by Megatron when the Transformers ended up in a parallel universe. Scorponok's alternative modes are a scorpion/construction vehicle hybrid for ground attack and a jet for transportation.
- The Battle Ravage are a group of black and white Terrorcons who transform into cougars. The Command Ravages are a variation who specialize in stealth missions.
- The Divebomb are a group of blue, brown, and white Terrorcons who transform into hawks. The Blackouts are a variation who specialize in stealth missions.
- The Cruellock are a group of red, blue, and white Terrorcons who transform into unspecified therapoda dinosaurs.
- The Insecticons are green and yellow Terrorcons who transform into rhinoceros beetles.

=== Humans ===
==== Jones family ====
- Kicker (voiced by Brad Swaile) is a teenage boy who was given the ability to detect Energon at a young age. Ever since, Kicker suffers multiple neuroses as a result of his father exploiting his gift and using him like a tool in his Energon research.
- Sally (voiced by Nicole Oliver) is Kicker's younger sister.
- Miranda (voiced by Nicole Oliver) is Kicker and Sally's mother.
- Brian Jones (voiced by Ron Halder) is Kicker and Sally's scientist father. He is an expert on Energon and often takes his son's power for granted.

==== Other humans ====
- Misha Miramond (voiced by Ellen Kennedy) is Kicker's scientist girlfriend who studies Energon.
- Bradley White (voiced by Kirby Morrow) is one of the Autobots' friends from Armada. He works with Dr. Jones and is the object of Sally's affections.
- Alexis Thi Dang (voiced by Tabitha St. Germain) is one of the Autobots' friends from Armada. She works as a government liaison between the humans and Transformers.
- Carlos Lopez (voiced by Matt Hill) is one of the Autobots' friends from Armada. He works in a station on Mars.

=== Other characters ===
- Alpha Quintesson (voiced by Trevor Devall) is a mysterious alien with four faces who remade the Terrorcons to remake his solar system that originally contained Planet Q. Alpha Quintesson is later killed by Unicron.
- Primus (voiced by Ron Halder) is the spark of Cybertron. His physical body is later seen in Cybertron when the planet begins assuming robot mode.
- Unicron' (voiced by Mark Acheson) is Primus' evil brother. He survived the end of Armada despite the combined efforts of the Autobots and Decepticons to destroy him near Armadas end. After he is destroyed once more by Optimus Prime, a piece of Unicron's mind merges with Megatron. Megatron throws himself into a protostar made of Super Energon, turning it into a sun.

== Cast ==
=== English cast (Energon) ===
Arranged alphabetically by last name.

- Alistair Abell - Prowl
- Mark Acheson - Unicron
- Sharon Alexander - Arcee
- Doron Bell - Cliffjumper
- Don Brown - Cyclonus/Snow Cat, Constructicon Maximus/Steamhammer
- Garry Chalk - Optimus Prime
- Michael Daingerfield - Inferno/Roadblock
- Trevor Devall - Alpha Q, Bruticus Maximus/Barricade
- Michael Dobson - Signal Flare, Starscream
- Paul Dobson - Rodimus, Superion Maximus/Storm Jet
- Brian Drummond - Shockblast
- Tabitha St. Germain - Alexis
- Ron Halder - Primus, Brian Jones, Padlock
- Matt Hill - Carlos, Ironhide
- David Kaye - Megatron/Galvatron
- Ellen Kennedy - Misha Miramond
- Terry Klassen - Skyblast, Six Shot
- Scott McNeil - Jetfire, Omega Supreme, Strongarm
- Brent Miller - Hot Shot
- Kirby Morrow - Bradley "Rad" White
- Colin Murdock - Scorponok, Wing Saber
- Nicole Oliver - Miranda Jones, Sally Jones
- Ty Olsson - Downshift
- Doug Parker - Tidal Wave/Mirage
- Ward Perry - Landmine
- Alvin Sanders - Demolishor
- Tony Sampson - Rhyming Omnicon fanboys
- Brad Swaile - Kicker Jones
- French Tickner - Bulkhead

=== Japanese cast (Superlink) ===
The cast of Superlink was:

- Akira Tomisaka - Alexa
- Daisuke Kishio - Kicker
- Isshin Chiba - SandStorm/SnowStorm, BlastArm, Superion
- Jin Yamanoi - ShockWave/ShockFleet, Dr. Jones, AirGlide
- Junichi Endo - Galvatron, Carlos
- Katsuyuki Konishi - Grand Convoy, OverDrive
- Kenta Miyake - LandMine, Omega Supreme
- Koji Yusa - Ironhide/Irontread, Wing Dagger/Wing Saber
- Kohsuke Toriumi - Hot Shot
- Makoto Yasumura - Red Alert, WheelJack, Bruticus
- Masataka Nakai - Rad
- Masumi Asano - Sally, Miranda, Ariel
- Mitsuo Iwata - Roadbuster
- Nobuo Tobita - Nightscream, Sprung, Signal Flare, Buildron, Padlock
- Nobutoshi Kanna - Inferno, Laserwave, Sixshot
- Nobuyuki Hiyama - Skyfire
- Ryotaro Okiayu - Rodimus Convoy
- Tesshō Genda - Primus
- Yasunori Masutani - MegaZarak
- Yukiko Tagami - Misha
- Yūichi Nagashima - AlphaQ, DinoBot
  - Yukie Maeda - AlphaQ (true)

== Comics ==
Such as with the previous line of Transformers: Armada, the Energon toyline came with its own mini-comic/toy catalogue with a brief five-page story told in multiple languages one after the other; most of them formed parts of an arc, whilst others featured back and forth victories between the Autobots and Decepticons, whilst showcasing the new additions to the line such as the Terrorcons and Omnicons.

Energon's mainstream comic distribution came courtesy of the former comics giant Dreamwave, taking over their Armada comic title with Issue 18, and written by Simon Furman. But whilst the Armada title had faithfully approached the concepts of the animated series, this title took liberties with the characters and told a far more expansive arc, even incorporating completely new players, such as a member of the High Council type Autobot named Avalon secretly collaborating with Alpha Q, who, like his animated counterpart, had a separate agenda, but it may never be known if he had the same goals as the anime version.

The initial story arc also continued plotlines from the final Armada issue, as it retained Optimus Prime's Armada form (in its upgraded grey and blue Powerlinx form) for the earliest portions as Cybertron came under attack from the still thriving, but damaged, Unicron. Several Autobots and a Decepticon Unicron had captured in the final Armada issue became his "Four Horsemen", a nod to one of the past Botcon Hasbro panels in which Aaron Archer called these four Unicron's Four Horsemen. The Four Horsemen are Rhinox (War), Terrorsaur (Famine), Airazor (Death), and Cheetor (Pestilence). As the Horsemen ravaged Cybertron, Prime interacted with Vector Sigma and was upgraded to his traditional Energon form.

Rad, Carlos, and Alexis were given more character development the Energon comic as opposed to the supporting bit parts/semi-cameos they had in the television series, Alexis was now an anti-war demonstrator, in no government position, and was largely responsible for the Autobots being able to retrieve Kicker from a Decepticon ambush. Rad and Alexis would get more time, sans Carlos, as the storylines progressed, with both showing a deeper affection for the other, however the relationship was never fully explored due to the closure of Dreamwave.

The Transformers presence on Earth was also handled with more resentment and hostility from a handful of citizens; this culminated in a large-scale Terrorcon assault on Earth during the second story arc, as Megatron transported Optimus into the hub of Unicron, where his spark had been trapped since the conclusion of the Armada comic, and manipulated Prime into freeing him so he could enter a body he had been secretly preparing. Upon release, Megatron swiftly took control of the Decepticons again, killing their leader Scorponok. Optimus remained inside Unicron, fighting off the horrors within heading for a final showdown with the heart of the enemy.

Unfortunately, like many of the plotlines above, the comic folded, with all of the ongoing storylines abandoned, although it was confirmed in the final issue that the intended last arc for the Energon comic would have led directly into DW's own version of events in Transformers: Cybertron.

IDW, the current holders of the franchise, have not continued publication of the Energon comic or even published a Cybertron comic, they did however release a collection of the Hasbro Transformers Collectors' Club exclusive storyline, Transformers: Cybertron - Balancing Act, which followed Vector Prime, on a side quest to the central Cybertron animated series storyline.

== Toys ==
A small number of Transformers: Energon Built to Rule sets had a limited, test market release, and the structure of the Trans-Skeleton was changed for the Energon characters, to a much more solid skeleton with larger, blockier limbs. This led to much more solid, stable and sturdy-looking robot modes, but the entire line performed poorly, so it was dropped in its entirety in 2004.
