= KidsClick =

US television program

- Network: This TV (2017–18); TBD (2018–19); Syndication (2017–19)
- Launched: July 1, 2017; 9 years ago
- Closed: March 31, 2019; 7 years ago
- Country of origin: United States
- Owner: Sinclair Broadcast Group
- Key people: Daniel Barnathan; (Vice President, Family and Children's Programming and Sales); Jonathan Dern; (Executive Producer)
- Format: Weekday/weekend morning cartoon block
- Running time: 3 hours
- Original language: English

KidsClick was a daily children's programming block distributed by Sinclair Broadcast Group, which premiered on July 1, 2017. The block, which primarily consisted of long-form animated series as well as some short-form content, was carried in the U.S. on terrestrial television network TBD, and on Sinclair-owned/operated television stations in several markets. At launch, the block was available in 75 million households. The block marked the return of traditional weekday cartoons and Saturday morning cartoons to terrestrial television, as well as the first children's programming block on U.S. free-to-air television not to comply with Children's Television Act regulations since the Saban Brands-produced Vortexx closed on September 27, 2014.

The This TV iteration of the block accompanied an existing, unbranded lineup of educational programming on weekend mornings, which had aired on the network since November 1, 2013, after the closure of Cookie Jar Toons (which coincided with original co-owner Weigel Broadcasting transferring its 50% interest in the network to Tribune Broadcasting, as well as the Cookie Jar Group's absorption into DHX Media [now WildBrain]); it also marked the first time that This TV had carried children's programming on Monday through Saturday mornings since Tribune (whom Sinclair later attempted and failed to acquire) assumed partial ownership of the network. On July 1, 2018, This TV stopped carriage of KidsClick, which was transferred to Sinclair's TBD channel, which had been carrying the block on a transitional basis since May 7 of that year.

On March 29, 2019, shortly after closing sister site Circa News, KidsClick's Facebook page announced the block's closure on March 31, 2019.

== History ==
On May 2, 2017, Sinclair Broadcast Group announced that it would launch a multi-platform children's programming block on linear television and online platforms. The company partnered with MGM Domestic Television Distribution to develop and distribute KidsClick, a joint venture between Sinclair Broadcast Group and Toon Goggles, which it planned to air nationally on This TV and select network affiliates (particularly those affiliated with The CW, and the MyNetworkTV programming service, as well as some Fox-affiliated stations that do not carry local morning newscasts in the block's designated timeslots) and independent stations owned or operated by Sinclair on July 1, 2017. Its content encompasses short- and long-form material and is distributed online, through web browsers and mobile apps in video-on-demand and live streaming formats. The network's distribution and website utilized Imagine Communications' cloud technology from Sinclair's Las Vegas studios for their market triopoly.

Sinclair returned to the children's television market with KidsClick several years after The Program Exchange closed (a barter syndicator of programming which ended up as the last company providing non-educational children's content to television stations before its 2016 dissolution), an industry estimated to be worth $1 billion, which is currently largely split in advertising revenue between Nickelodeon and Cartoon Network. Speaking to the return of children's programming on American commercial broadcast television, Steven M. Marks, COO and EVP of Sinclair Television Group, said in an earnings report on May 3, 2017: "That's a $1 billion-plus spot business that we don't get a dime from. So again, it's an illustration of going back into the marketplace and fishing in ponds that we haven't fished in. So that's $1 billion that is pretty much split between [two] cable networks: Nickelodeon and the Cartoon Network. Disney is a subscription network. 18 years ago, we were the kings of reaching kids every day. There's no reason in the world why we can't be successful in that space."

On March 29, 2019, KidsClick announced on Facebook that the block would shutdown on March 31. Sinclair also closed sister property Circa News three days prior to the announcement. Sinclair would later claim that the block was closed "for business reasons", but that its use of cloud technology was a successful testing ground to use the technology for its digital broadcast networks.

KidsClick ceased operations on March 31, 2019, with an airing of Oggy and the Cockroaches as its final program; all advertising made no mention of its shutdown, and the promotional spot at the end of the show mentioned it would return the next Saturday morning. For the vast majority of stations carrying it, temporary or permanent paid programming, religious programming, other syndicated content, or alternate E/I-complaint shows overlaid the former timeslot until more permanent programming was scheduled in the fall; this would turn out to be the national news service from Sinclair, The National Desk, for many Sinclair stations. Paid programming and some Internet-originated content series replaced it on TBD. Several days later, the block's website was taken down, with the domain redirected to the main Sinclair corporate page.

In 2022, three years after KidsClick's shutdown, nineteen stations, along with Sinclair itself and Nexstar Media Group, were proposed to be fined $3.4 million for a violation of children's ad guidelines, involving advertising for Mattel's Hot Wheels airing during episodes of Team Hot Wheels without being screened out, which under said guidelines, made the entire half-hour a program-length commercial.

== Scheduling ==
The block was preferred to air every Monday-Friday from 6:00 to 9:00 a.m., and Saturday and Sundays from 7:00 to 10:00 a.m. local time, though scheduling variances existed in certain markets due to network programming obligations (such as One Magnificent Morning airing from 8:00 to 11:00 a.m., which delayed or preempted the KidsClick Saturday Morning lineup on CW-affiliated stations that carried both blocks), existing contracts for other syndicated programming or with paid or religious programming providers, or a preference to air news and sports programming in those slots. It aired in a downscaled letterbox format via This TV, as that network had yet to upgrade to an HD master feed; it otherwise aired in HD or at least in widescreen on most of its affiliates and via the TBD network later on.

Because the programs featured on KidsClick did not meet educational content guidelines defined in the Children's Television Act by the Federal Communications Commission (FCC), This TV continued to air a block of live-action travel and wildlife series from Steve Rotfeld Productions immediately after the weekend broadcasts of the KidsClick lineup to fulfill the mandate (accordingly, the network's E/I block switched from a singular, three-hour block aired only on Sunday mornings to two separate 90-minute-long blocks that will air on Saturdays and Sundays). Sinclair-operated independent stations that aired KidsClick also continue to provide E/I-compliant programs acquired from the syndication market through individual distributors, from Fox's Xploration Station block managed by Rotfeld, or via the Litton Entertainment-distributed Go Time block to meet the quotas.

== Programming ==
=== Former programming ===
==== Original programming ====
Some of the following programming made their debut or some previous programming that premiered on other networks aired new episodes on KidsClick.

Title	Premiere date	End date	Original network	Moved to	Source(s)
Scary Larry	July 1, 2017	December 10, 2017	Originally aired		
Miraculous: Tales of Ladybug & Cat Noir	July 3, 2017	March 29, 2019	Nickelodeon	Disney Channel	
Rocket Monkeys	July 3, 2017	March 29, 2019	Nickelodeon		
Super 4	July 3, 2017	August 24, 2018	Netflix	Primo TV; Netflix	
Team Hot Wheels	September 16, 2017	January 20, 2019	Cartoon Network; Netflix		
Zak Storm	September 30, 2017	January 7, 2018	Originally aired	Discovery Family	
Mecard	June 16, 2018	January 20, 2019	Originally aired		
The Legendaries	June 16, 2018	July 8, 2018	Originally aired	Primo TV	
Lego Friends: Girls on a Mission	December 10, 2018	January 22, 2019	Originally aired	Kabillion	

==== Acquired programming ====
Title	Premiere date	End date	Original network	Moved to	Source(s)
RoboCop: Alpha Commando	July 1, 2017	September 10, 2017	Syndication		
Pac-Man and the Ghostly Adventures	July 1, 2017	March 31, 2019	Disney XD	Discovery Family; Primo TV	
Pink Panther and Pals	July 1, 2017	March 31, 2019	Cartoon Network		
Max Steel	July 3, 2017	June 15, 2018	Disney XD; Netflix		
Angry Birds	July 3, 2017	March 31, 2019	Toons.TV; Netflix	Netflix	
Winx Club	October 9, 2017	March 2, 2018	4Kids TV (Fox); The CW4Kids (The CW)	Nickelodeon	
Dinosaur King	February 5, 2018	August 24, 2018	4Kids TV (Fox); The CW4Kids (The CW)	Primo TV	
Oggy and the Cockroaches	June 18, 2018	March 31, 2019	Fox Kids (Fox); Nickelodeon		
Transformers: Energon	August 27, 2018	November 3, 2018	Cartoon Network		
The Jungle Book	August 27, 2018	March 29, 2019	Disney XD		
Barbie Dreamtopia	September 24, 2018	March 29, 2019	Starz		
Monster High: Adventures of the Ghoul Squad	September 24, 2018	March 29, 2019	Monster High YouTube channel		
Transformers: Cybertron	September 30, 2018	March 31, 2019	Cartoon Network; Kids' WB! (The CW)		

=== Special programming ===
Title	Initial broadcast date	Source(s)
A Monsterous Holiday	October 27, 2018	
Under Wraps	October 28, 2018	
Dear Dracula	October 29, 2018	
A Monster Christmas	November 22, 2018	
Frozen in Time	November 22, 2018	
The Naughty List	November 23, 2018	

=== Scrapped programming ===
Title	Planned premiere date	Original network	Source(s)
G.I. Joe: A Real American Hero	July 1, 2017	Syndication	
Mighty Morphin' Power Rangers	July 1, 2017	Fox Kids (Fox); ABC Kids (ABC)	
Oddbods	August 27, 2018	Disney XD	
Sonic X	July 1, 2017	4Kids TV (Fox); The CW4Kids (The CW)	
Transformers: Prime	July 1, 2017	Discovery Family	
Transformers: Robots in Disguise	July 1, 2017	Cartoon Network	

== Affiliate list ==
The following is a list of stations that carried KidsClick in syndication as of its March 31, 2019, closure, which included the possibility that a TBD affiliate on a station owned by Sinclair or another owner would air the programming block in the same market near or at the same time:

City of license/Market	Station	Channel	Affiliation	Owner
Albany–Schenectady–Troy, New York	WCWN	45.1	The CW	Sinclair Broadcast Group
Baltimore-Annapolis, Maryland	WUTB	24.1	MyNetworkTV	Deerfield Media (operated by Sinclair Broadcast Group)
Birmingham–Tuscaloosa–Anniston, Alabama	WABM	68.1	MyNetworkTV	Sinclair Broadcast Group
Bristol-Johnson City-Kingsport, Tennessee/ Bristol, Virginia	WEMT	39.1	Fox	Cunningham Broadcasting (operated by Sinclair Broadcast Group)
Buffalo, New York	WNYO	49.1	MyNetworkTV	Sinclair Broadcast Group
Cape Girardeau, Missouri/Paducah, Kentucky	WDKA	49.1	MyNetworkTV	Sinclair Broadcast Group
Cedar Rapids-Dubuque, Iowa	KFXA	28.1	Fox	Second Generation of Iowa, Ltd. (operated by Sinclair Broadcast Group)
Charleston, South Carolina	WCIV	36.1	MyNetworkTV	Sinclair Broadcast Group
Champaign-Danville-Springfield-Urbana, Illinois	WBUI	23.1	The CW	GOCOM Media, LLC (operated by Sinclair Broadcast Group)
Chattanooga, Tennessee	WFLI	53.1	The CW	MPS Media, LLC (operated by Sinclair Broadcast Group)
Chico-Redding, California	KZVU-LD; KRVU-LD	21.1; 22.1	MyNetworkTV	Sinclair Broadcast Group
Cincinnati, Ohio	WKRC-DT2	12.2	The CW	Sinclair Broadcast Group
Columbus, Ohio	WWHO	53.1	The CW	Manham Media (operated by Sinclair Broadcast Group)
Corpus Christi, Texas	KTOV-LP (analog); KSCC-DT3 (digital)	21 (analog); 38.3 (digital)	MyNetworkTV	Sinclair Broadcast Group
Des Moines, Iowa	KDSM	17.1	Fox	Sinclair Broadcast Group
El Paso, Texas/Las Cruces, New Mexico	KDBC-DT2	4.2	MyNetworkTV	Sinclair Broadcast Group
Eureka, California	KECA-LD2	29.2	MyNetworkTV	Sinclair Broadcast Group
Flint-Saginaw, Michigan	WSMH	66.1	Fox	Sinclair Broadcast Group
Florence–Myrtle Beach, South Carolina	WWMB	21.1	The CW	Howard Stirk Holdings (operated by Sinclair Broadcast Group)
Fresno–Visalia, California	KFRE	59.1	The CW	Sinclair Broadcast Group
Gainesville-Ocala, Florida	WGFL-DT2	28.2	MyNetworkTV	New Age Media, LLC (operated by Sinclair Broadcast Group)
Grand Rapids, Michigan	WWMT-DT2	3.2	The CW	Sinclair Broadcast Group
Green Bay–Fox Cities, Wisconsin	WCWF	14.1	The CW	Sinclair Broadcast Group
Greensboro-High Point-Winston-Salem, North Carolina	WMYV	48.1	MyNetworkTV	Sinclair Broadcast Group
Greenville-Jacksonville-New Bern, North Carolina	WYDO	14.1	Fox	Cunningham Broadcasting (operated by Sinclair Broadcast Group)
Greenville-Spartanburg-Anderson, South Carolina/ Asheville, North Carolina	WMYA	40.1	MyNetworkTV	Cunningham Broadcasting (operated by Sinclair Broadcast Group)
Harrisburg-Lancaster-Lebanon-York, Pennsylvania	WHP-DT3	21.3	The CW	Sinclair Broadcast Group
Las Vegas, Nevada	KVCW-DT2	33.2	MyNetworkTV	Sinclair Broadcast Group
Lexington-Frankfort, Kentucky	WDKY	56.1	Fox	Sinclair Broadcast Group
Lincoln-Superior-Grand Island, Nebraska	KFXL	51.1	Fox	Sinclair Broadcast Group
Madison, Wisconsin	WMSN	47.1	Fox	Sinclair Broadcast Group
Milwaukee, Wisconsin	WVTV	18.1	The CW	Sinclair Broadcast Group
Minneapolis–St. Paul, Minnesota	WUCW	23.1	The CW	Sinclair Broadcast Group
Mobile, Alabama-Pensacola, Florida	WFGX	35.1	MyNetworkTV	Sinclair Broadcast Group
Nashville, Tennessee	WNAB	58.1	The CW	Tennessee Broadcasting (operated by Sinclair Broadcast Group)
Norfolk-Portsmouth-Newport News-Virginia Beach, Virginia	WTVZ	33.1	MyNetworkTV	Sinclair Broadcast Group
Oklahoma City, Oklahoma	KOCB	34.1	The CW	Sinclair Broadcast Group
Omaha, Nebraska	KXVO	15.1	The CW	Mitts Telecasting Company (operated by Sinclair Broadcast Group)
Pittsburgh, Pennsylvania	WPNT	22.1	MyNetworkTV	Sinclair Broadcast Group
Portland-Auburn-Augusta, Maine	WPFO	23.1	Fox	Cunningham Broadcasting (operated by Sinclair Broadcast Group)
Raleigh–Durham–Fayetteville, North Carolina	WRDC	28.1	MyNetworkTV	Sinclair Broadcast Group
Richmond-Petersburg, Virginia	WRLH-DT2	35.2	MyNetworkTV	Sinclair Broadcast Group
Rochester, New York	WHAM-DT2	13.2	The CW	Deerfield Media (operated by Sinclair Broadcast Group)
Salt Lake City, Utah	KMYU	12.1	MyNetworkTV	Sinclair Broadcast Group
San Antonio, Texas	KMYS	35.1	The CW	Deerfield Media (operated by Sinclair Broadcast Group)
Savannah, Georgia	WTGS	28.1	Fox	Sinclair Broadcast Group
Scranton-Wilkes-Barre, Pennsylvania	WQMY	53.1	MyNetworkTV	New Age Media, LLC (operated by Sinclair Broadcast Group)
Sioux City, Iowa	KPTH	44.1	Fox	Sinclair Broadcast Group
South Bend, Indiana	WSBT-DT2	22.2	Fox	Sinclair Broadcast Group
Syracuse, New York	WSTQ-LP (analog); WSTM-DT2 (digital)	14 (analog); 3.2 (digital)	The CW	Sinclair Broadcast Group
Tallahassee, Florida	WTWC-DT2	40.2	Fox	Sinclair Broadcast Group
Wheeling, West Virginia/Steubenville, Ohio	WTOV-DT2	9.2	Fox	Sinclair Broadcast Group
Wichita, Kansas	KMTW	36.1	MyNetworkTV	Mercury Broadcasting Company, Inc. (operated by Sinclair Broadcast Group)
