= The Legendaries =

French fantasy comic book

- Volume 1 of The Legendaries. Clockwise from top: Razzia, Shimy, Jadina, Claw, and Danael.

Publication information
- Publisher: Delcourt
- Schedule: Finished
- Genre: Fantasy, Adventure
- Publication date: 2004
- No. of issues: 6
- Main characters: Danael; Jadina; Claw; Shimy; Razzia

Creative team
- Written by: Patrick Sobral
- Artist: Patrick Sobral
- Penciller: Patrick Sobral
- Inker: Patrick Sobral

The Legendaries (French: Les Légendaires) is a comic book series created in 2004 by Patrick Sobral and published by Delcourt. It is set in a world called Alysia. The Legendaries are five heroes who, in an attempt to stop an evil sorcerer named Darkhell from using the Stone of Jovénia, one of six magical stones used to create the world of Alysia, were unable to keep it from shattering, causing everyone, themselves included, to revert to childhood. Blamed by the people of Alysia for the "Jovénia Incident", the Legendaries split up, only to be reunited by their erstwhile leader Danael in an attempt to undo the spell and restore their adulthood. Sales for the comic books began in October 2012. The comic books sold over 2 million copies.

== The Legendaries ==
- Danael - The Leader of the Legendaries. Knight of the Kingdom of Larbos and former member of the Silver Falcons who represents the virtue of Dignity. His goal in life is to fight injustice throughout Alysia. He is armed with a golden sword forged in the Elven World.
- Jadina - A magician and a princess who represents the virtue of Intelligence. Her parents, the King and Queen of the kingdom of Orchidia hate her because she entered the Legendaries team.
- Ironclaw / Claw (French: Gryfenfer / Gryf) - A man-beast representing the virtue of Courage. Claw is Danael's best friend whose courage is joined with an impulsiveness that causes him to make foes. His claws can slice through rock.
- Shimy - An Elemental Elf who represents the virtue of Purity. As an Elemental Elf, she is able to fuse with earth, water and fire. Shimy and Jadina don't get along.
- Razzia -The Colossus of Rymar who represents the virtue of Strength. Once a muscular barbarian hero, he has been reduced to the pudgy overweight boy he used to be, but still retains his strength. Razzia is armed with a blade dubbed the "Leviathan" and has a large appetite.
- Ténébris - The daughter of the evil sorcerer Darkhell, she joins the group after the death of Danael in the 10th volume. She was once The Legendaries's sworn enemy, but they accepted her when they finally recognised the good in her. She is sentimentally bonded to Razzia, as they once worked together for Tenebris's father, Darkhell.
- Amylada - A chiridirelle demon that has replaced Razzia's arm after he loses it fighting Anathos, Amylada (a.k.a. "Amy") has de facto become a member of the group. She was imprisoned and tortured by galina sorcerer Skroa, after her species lost a war against the Galinas, a long time ago. Amy is the last of her race, just like Skroa is of his, and she has sworn to herself that she will completely exterminate the Galinas by killing their last individual. She expanded this hate to Shun-Day, Skroa's daughter, but, after learning that Shund-Day was made using Amy's cells, and that the sorcerer's daughter had been abused of the same way as the Chiridirelle, Amylada understood that she should not hate Shun-Day, but redirect her rage against Skroa.

== Volumes ==
The following volumes have been released in English through ComiXology:

1. The Stone of Jovénia

2. The Guardian

3. Brother Enemies

4. The Awakening of the Krea-Kaos

5. Heart of the Past

6. Hand of the Future

== Television series ==
On March 20, 2012, Genao Productions announced that it had acquired the rights to develop an animated series based on The Legendaries from Delcourt. A year later, broadcasters TF1 and Canal J in France picked up the show. In 2014, Sobral confirmed he was consulting on the project and that it would begin airing the following year. Ultimately, the 26-episode series would premiere in France on TF1 on April 30, 2017, with the Canal J run beginning on August 27, 2018. In North America, the French version premiered on TiVi5 Monde in the United States in February 2018, followed by a debut in Canada on Télé-Québec on March 3, 2018.

An English-dubbed version premiered on TVNZ in New Zealand on March 31, 2018. In the United States, the series initially ran on KidsClick between June 16, 2018 and July 8, 2018. It would later air on Primo TV beginning December 2, 2020.

== Animated Film ==
On June 18, 2021, it was announced an animated film was currently in development. The film The Legendaries was released on January 28, 2026.

== External ==
- Official website (in french)
- Official TV series website
