= Blue Zoo (TV series) =

- Genre: Children's documentary
- Created by: Sally Browning; Dean Cropp
- Directed by: Sally Browning; Gary Doust
- Narrated by: Xenia Goodwin (Australia); Liam McKenna (Ireland)
- Country of origin: Australia
- No. of series: 1
- No. of episodes: 13

Production
- Producers: David Atkins; Sally Browning; Dean Cropp; Nick Hopkin; Donna Damassa
- Production locations: Dolphin Marine Magic, Coffs Harbour
- Running time: 26 minutes
- Production companies: Air Pig Productions; ABC3; David Atkins Enterprises; RTÉ Young Peoples Programmes

Original release
- Network: ABC3
- Release: 2014 – 2014

Blue Zoo is a 2014 Australian children's television reality television series broadcast on ABC3 in Australia and RTÉ Kids in Ireland. During six weeks of production, eight teenage "rookies" work with marine animals at Dolphin Marine Magic in Coffs Harbour in order to become marine experts.

== Production ==
500 teenagers from Australia and Ireland auditioned to become "rookies" on the show. Blue Zoo was filmed at the Dolphin Marine Magic marine park in Coffs Harbour from October to November 2013. The show first aired in Australia on ABC3 in 2014.

== Cast ==
Rookie	Country
Dana Ubiparipovic	Australia
Ivy Nehl	Australia
Bailey Hendy	Australia
Jaymin Hyland-Taylor	Australia
Aurea Kenny	Ireland
Sophie O'Loughlin-Kennedy	Ireland
Tallann Maguire	Ireland
Darragh Joyce	Ireland

== International broadcast ==
Country	Broadcaster
Canada	TVOKids
Hungary	Cartoon Network
Romania	Cartoon Network
United States	Primo TV
