= Rolling with the Ronks! =

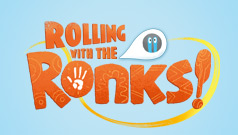
- Genre: Comedy; Science fiction
- Created by: Olivier Jean-Marie; Charles Vaucelle
- Developed by: Franck Ekinci
- Voices of: Tom Kenny; Jessica DiCicco; Scott Whyte; Charlie Adler; Cree Summer; Dee Bradley Baker; Billy West
- Composer: Vincent Artaud
- Country of origin: France
- Original languages: French; English
- No. of episodes: 52

Production
- Executive producer: Marc du Pontavice
- Producer: Marc du Pontavice
- Editor: Lou Bouniol
- Running time: 11 minutes
- Production company: Xilam Animation

Original release
- Network: France 3 Disney Channel (France)
- Release: August 22, 2016 – June 22, 2017

Rolling with the Ronks! (French: Bienvenue chez les Ronks !) is a French animated children's television series created by Olivier Jean-Marie and Charles Vaucelle. The series was produced by Xilam Animation and animated by Armada TMT with the participation of France Télévisions and Disney Channel. The series debuted on Disney Channel in Poland on August 22, 2016.

== Plot ==
Rolling with the Ronks! follows Flash, an alien who is sent to Earth, to the Ronk tribe in 37,520 BC to show them the future. To do this, the Ronk tribe are introduced to a variety of ideas. He is friends with two members of said tribe - Mila and Walter, who accompany him to try and prove he can succeed at his goal. However – Mormagnon, along with Godzi (his pet lizard), will do anything to ruin his plans.

== Characters ==
- Flash (voiced by Tom Kenny) is a blue alien with two eye-stalks and frog-like legs. He acts as a mentor to the Ronk tribe, showing off concepts that would be recognizable but impossible to do at the time (as there is no electricity, etc.), like technology.
- Mila (voiced by Jessica DiCicco) is a cave girl. She is tomboyish and courageous, willing to try new ideas. However, this also ends up making her take advantage of Flash's ideas, but she feels sorry for what she does.
- Walter (voiced by Scott Whyte) is Mila's uncle. He is also well-meaning in assisting Flash, even if it means getting his niece involved. While he is large and is not very smart, he also cares about Mila.
- Mormagnon (voiced by Charlie Adler) is the main antagonist of the series. He is greedy and petty. Mormagnon wears a furry costume.
- Mama (voiced by Cree Summer) is the chief of the tribe, happy to accept Flash's next idea. However, she calls him out whenever her tribe is at a disadvantage at times. She appears to be the oldest member, with graying hair.
- Godzi (voiced by Dee Bradley Baker^{[episodes 1-12]}, Billy West ^{[episodes 13-52]}) is Mormagnon's pet, who resembles a frilled-neck lizard. While not as malicious as his owner, he follows along with Mormagnon's plans anyway. He can breathe fire - a trait sometimes used to the others' advantage.

== Episodes ==
=== Pilot (2016) ===
Title	Directed by	Written by	Storyboarded by	Date
"Welcome to the Ronks!"	Charles Vaucelle	Louis Aubert & Guillaume Cochard	Charles Vaucelle	July 3, 2016

=== Season 1 (2016–17) ===
No.	Title	Directed by	Written by	Storyboard by	Original release date
1	"Crash and Learn" "(Les Rois du ciel)"	Charles Vaucelle	Louis Aubert, Guillaume Cochard, and Jean-Marc Lenglen	Jean Cayrol, Charles Vaucelle, and Jean-Louis Champault	August 22, 2016
Mila wants to fly.
2	"Taming of the Gnu" "(Touche pas à mon gnou)"	Charles Vaucelle	Jean-Marc Lenglen	Jean-Louis Champault	October 18, 2016
3	"The Wheel of Misfortune" "(La Roue de l'infortune)"	Charles Vaucelle	Olivier Jean-Marie	Jean-Louis Champault	October 19, 2016
Flash invents the wheel.
4	"A Good Connection" "(Les Baskets de la gloire)"	Charles Vaucelle	Olivier Jean-Marie	Lionel Brousse	October 20, 2016
Flash brings a shellphone to Mila so that she can talk with her friend.
5	"Game On" "(Place au sport)"	Charles Vaucelle	Cindy Morrow	Marc-Antoine Buhagiar	October 21, 2016
6	"Rubber Age" "(L'Âge du caoutchouc)"	Charles Vaucelle	Michel Coulon	Lionel Brousse	November 6, 2016
7	"HumonGorilla" "(Le Méga gorille)"	Charles Vaucelle	Dave Lewman	Marc-Antoine Buhagiar	November 22, 2016
8	"No Shoes Is Good Shoes" "(Allô, les Ronks ?)"	Charles Vaucelle	Philippe Clerc	Julien Charles	November 23, 2016
9	"Mod-Cons" "(Le Confort moderne)"	Charles Vaucelle	Jean-Marc Lenglen	Olivier Thulliez	November 24, 2016
10	"Blue Genes" "(Flash et Les mutants)"	Charles Vaucelle	Story by : Jean-Marc Lenglen; Teleplay by : Eddy Fluchon and Jérôme Erbin	François Reczulski	November 25, 2016
11	"The Ronk Race" "(Course pour les Ronks)"	J.C. Dessaint and Charles Vaucelle	Mike Yank	Morade Rahni	November 28, 2016
12	"Go Your Own Way" "(Déboussolés)"	J.C. Dessaint and Charles Vaucelle	Dayla Kennedy	Jean-Christophe Dessaint	November 29, 2016
13	"The Flying Dodo" "(Le Dodo au volant)"	J.C. Dessaint and Charles Vaucelle	Renaud Gagnon	Marc-Antoine Buhagiar	November 30, 2016
14	"Hold Back the Night" "(Retiens la nuit)"	J.C. Dessaint and Charles Vaucelle	Michel Coulon	Julien Charles	December 1, 2016
15	"Flash a Smile" "(Le Sourire qui tue)"	J.C. Dessaint and Charles Vaucelle	Olivier Jean-Marie	Brice Magnier	December 2, 2016
16	"No Tech Flash" "(Flash zéro techno)"	J.C. Dessaint and Charles Vaucelle	Dave Lewman	Lionel Brousse	December 12, 2016
17	"Intergalactic Star" "(Star intergalactique)"	J.C. Dessaint and Charles Vaucelle	Michel Coulon	Julien Charles	December 13, 2016
18	"Stuck on You" "(Mama recolle les morceaux)"	J.C. Dessaint and Charles Vaucelle	Philippe Clerc	Laurent Jennet	December 14, 2016
19	"Walterproof" "(Épreuve de l'eau)"	J.C. Dessaint and Charles Vaucelle	Michel Coulon	Marc-Antoine Buhagiar	December 15, 2016
20	"I Smell a Hat" "(Une enquête dé-coiffante)"	J.C. Dessaint and Charles Vaucelle	Michel Coulon	Lionel Brousse	December 16, 2016
21	"Little Ronks of Horror" "(Un peu de sérieux)"	J.C. Dessaint	Dayla Kennedy	Laurent Jennet	January 25, 2017
22	"Turn Up the Heat" "(Ça chauffe pour les Ronks)"	J.C. Dessaint	Olivier Jean-Marie	Lionel Brousse	January 25, 2017
23	"The Inspection" "(L'Inspection)"	J.C. Dessaint	Jérôme Erbin and Eddy Fluchon	Marc-Antoine Buhagiar	January 26, 2017
24	"Ronks and Relaxation" "(Club Ronk et relaxation)"	J.C. Dessaint	Sylvain Bousquet	Lionel Brousse	January 26, 2017
25	"Birthday Bashed (#27)" "(Un anniversaire explosif)"	J.C. Dessaint	Franck Ekinci	Marc-Antoine Buhagiar	January 27, 2017
26	"The Ronks Hit the Slopes (#28)" "(Les Ronks font du ski)"	J.C. Dessaint	Jérôme Erbin and Eddy Fluchon	François Reczulski	January 27, 2017
27	"Seven Clicks from Disaster (#29)" "(Sept clics avant le désastre)"	J.C. Dessaint	Franck Ekinci	Laurent Jennet	January 30, 2017
28	"Stealing the Show (#30)" "(L'imposteur)"	J.C. Dessaint	Nicole Paglia	Jean-Louis Champault	January 30, 2017
29	"Baby Bother (#25)" "(Baby-sitting de l'extrême)"	J.C. Dessaint	Dave Lewman	Laurent Jennet	January 31, 2017
30	"You Can't Be Serious! (#26)" "(Flash, fais-moi peur !)"	J.C. Dessaint	Chara Campanella	Lionel Brousse	January 31, 2017
31	"Jurassic Flash Back" "(Retour au Jurassique)"	J.C. Dessaint	Michel Coulon	Lionel Brousse	February 1, 2017
32	"Godzi Said So" "(Parole de Godzi)"	J.C. Dessaint	Jérôme Erbin and Eddy Fluchon	François Reczulski	February 1, 2017
33	"Take It to the Field" "(L'important c'est de gagner)"	J.C. Dessaint	Sébastien Viaud	Julien Charles	February 3, 2017
34	"Stormy Weather" "(Tempête sur les Ronks)"	J.C. Dessaint	Jérôme Erbin	François Reczulski	February 3, 2017
35	"Body Swap" "(Sors de ce corps !)"	J.C. Dessaint	Philippe Clerc	Jérôme Fardini	June 12, 2017
36	"Growing Pains" "(Faut pas pousser !)"	J.C. Dessaint	Sébastien Viaud	Cédric Guaneri	June 12, 2017
37	"No Laughing Matter" "(Y a pas de quoi rigoler)"	J.C. Dessaint	Nicole Paglia	Marc-Antoine Buhagiar	June 13, 2017
38	"Mila's Mutiny" "(Mila la rebelle)"	J.C. Dessaint	Caroline Torelli	Laurent Jennet	June 13, 2017
39	"Good Walt Hunting" "(Le chasseur qui savait chanter)"	J.C. Dessaint	Chara Campanella	Lionel Brousse	June 14, 2017
40	"Fashion Victims" "(Haute couture)"	J.C. Dessiant	Patrick Ducruet	Marc-Antoine Buhagiar	June 14, 2017
41	"No More Magnon" "(L'exil de Mormagnon)"	J.C. Dessaint	Story by : Andrew Caulcutt and Hélène Cica; Teleplay by : Sébastien Viaud	Jérôme Fardini	June 15, 2017
42	"Substitute Mama" "(Le remplaçant de Mama)"	J.C. Dessaint	Dave Lewman	Jean-Louis Champault	June 15, 2017
43	"Out to Lunch" "(Illusions gourmandes)"	J.C. Dessaint	J.C. Dessaint	Laurent Jennet	June 16, 2017
44	"The First Ronk in Space" "(Le premier Ronk sur Mars)"	J.C. Dessiant	Olivier Jean-Marie	David Encinas	June 16, 2017
45	"Thirst and Furious (#46)" "(La ruée vers l'eau)"	J.C. Dessiant	Story by : Andrzej Radka; Teleplay by : Renaud Gagnon	Jean-Louis Champault	June 19, 2017
46	"Love Coach (#45)" "(La science de l'amour)"	J.C. Dessiant	Story by : Andrew Caulcutt and Hélène Cica; Teleplay by : Sébastien Viaud	Patrice Musson	June 19, 2017
47	"Flash, You're Fired! (#51)" "(Flash, t'es viré !)"	J.C. Dessaint	Renaud Gagnon	Laurent Jennet	June 20, 2017
48	"The Great Unwashed (#52)" "(La grande crasse)"	J.C. Dessaint	Nicole Paglia	David Canoville	June 20, 2017
49	"See No Evil (#47)" "(Pas vu, pas pris)"	J.C. Dessaint	Story by : Andrzej Radka; Teleplay by : Jérôme Erbin and Eddy Fluchon	Jean-Louis Champault	June 21, 2017
50	"Think, Walter, Think! (#48)" "(Walter cogite !)"	J.C. Dessaint	Story by : Andrzej Radka; Teleplay by : Renaud Gagnon	Yves Montagne	June 21, 2017
51	"Uber Mormagnon (#49)" "(Super Cro-Magnon)"	J.C. Dessaint	Jérôme Erbin	Laurent Salou	June 22, 2017
52	"The Legend of Santug Kroyd (#50)" "(Joyeux Noël)"	J.C. Dessaint	Renaud Gagnon	Paul-Etienne Bourde	June 22, 2017

== Production ==
It was announced in 2011, alongside Hubert & Takako. According to Jean Brune, bringing together the entire writing team and the series' storyboard artists was a significant challenge. Initially, the various teams, such as the lead writer, the storyboard crew, and the director, were not well-aligned and it became clear that the story was losing its focus during the transitions between different production stages. The script was too long, and elements that were crucial to a character's emotional development were often being sidelined in favor of less significant material.

The validation and collaboration process proved to be quite time-consuming; as it required constant information exchange with the channels for each iteration, translations into English for discussions with the script editor, and subsequent translations into French for approval by France Télévisions. A script editor based in Los Angeles served as a bridge between the writers, refining the dialogue and facilitating communication with Disney.

== Broadcast ==
The series premiered on France 3 in France on February 6, 2017. The series premiered on Disney Channel in the United Kingdom and Ireland on July 22, 2017. The series was also broadcast in Germany. In the United States, the series is on Primo TV.
