= List of former V-me affiliates =

The following is a list of stations that are affiliated with the American Spanish-language network, V-me, prior to the network switching exclusively to a cable and satellite model of distribution.

- Tucson, Arizona - KUAT-TV - 6.2
- Fresno, California - KVPT - 18.3
- Los Angeles, California - KCET - 28.3
- Sacramento, California - KVIE - 6.3
- San Diego, California - KPBS-TV - 15.2
- San Jose, California - KQEH - 54.5/Comcast 191 and 621
- Watsonville, California - KQET - 25.3/Comcast 191 and 621
- Colorado - Rocky Mountain PBS:
  - Boulder, Colorado - K24HQ-D - 24.4
  - Denver, Colorado - KRMA - 6.2
  - Durango, Colorado - KRMU - 20.2
  - Grand Junction, Colorado - KRMJ - 18.2
  - Pueblo, Colorado - KTSC-TV - 8.2
  - Steamboat Springs, Colorado - KRMZ - 24.2
- Miami, Florida - WPBT - 2.3
- Orlando, Florida - WUCF-TV - 24.4
- Pensacola, Florida - WSRE - 23.4
- Tampa, Florida - WEDU - 3.2
- West Palm Beach, Florida - WXEL-TV - 42.3
- Chicago, Illinois - WTTW - 11.4
- Bloomington, Indiana - WTIU - 30.4
- Indianapolis, Indiana - WFYI - 20.2
- New Orleans, Louisiana - WLAE-TV - 32.4
- Maryland - Maryland Public Television:
  - Annapolis, Maryland - WMPT - 22.3
  - Baltimore, Maryland - WMPB - 67.3
  - Frederick, Maryland - WFPT - 62.3
  - Hagerstown, Maryland - WWPB - 31.3
  - Oakland, Maryland - WGPT - 36.3
  - Salisbury, Maryland - WCPB - 28.3
- Newark, New Jersey / New York City - WNET - 13.3
- Albuquerque, New Mexico - KNME-TV - 5.2
- Las Cruces, New Mexico - KRWG-TV - 22.3
- Las Vegas, Nevada - KLVX - 10.3
- Reno, Nevada - KNPB - 5.3
- Akron, Ohio - WEAO-TV - 49.4
- Alliance / Youngstown, Ohio - WNEO - 45.4
- Allentown, Pennsylvania - WLVT-TV - 39.3
- Mayagüez, Puerto Rico - WIPM-TV - 3.4
- San Juan, Puerto Rico - WIPR-TV - 6.4
- Providence, Rhode Island - WSBE-TV - 36.3
- Amarillo, Texas - KACV-TV - 2.2
- Austin, Texas - KLRU - 18.4
- Harlingen, Texas - KMBH - 38.2
- Houston, Texas - KUHT - 8.3
- El Paso, Texas - KRWG-TV - 22.3
- San Antonio, Texas - KLRN - 9.3
- Salt Lake City, Utah - KUED - 7.3
- St. George, Utah - KUEW - 18.3
- New Market / Front Royal, Virginia - WVPY - 42.3
- Staunton, Virginia - WVPT - 51.3
- Seattle, Washington - KCTS-TV - 9.2
- Yakima, Washington - KYVE - 47.2
- Milwaukee, Wisconsin - WMVS - 10.3
