= Sindbad & the 7 Galaxies =

- Genre: Entertainment; Children's; Comedy drama; Reality; Adventure
- Created by: Raja Masilamani
- Written by: Wayne Jackmani; Matt Robinson; Kirby Atkins
- Directed by: Raja Masilamani
- Starring: Tom Wayland; Scott Nichol; Keara Williams; Kevin Scott; Craig Webster
- Country of origin: United Kingdom
- No. of episodes: 26

Production
- Producers: Raja Masilamani; Paul Robinson
- Production locations: New Zealand, Taiwan, Beijing
- Production company: Creative Media Partners

Original release
- Network: Discovery Kids; MBC 3 Primo TV; Sun TV; Be.Television
- Release: 2016 – 2020

Sindbad & the 7 Galaxies (also stylized Sindbad & The 7 Galaxies, SINDBAD 7 GALAXIES or simply Sindbad) is a British animated children's comedy adventure TV series created by Raja Masilamani and IP owned by Creative Media Partners.

It is broadcast on Discovery Kids, MBC 3, Primo TV, Sun TV, and Be.Television.

The series, aimed at age 6-11, follows the adventures of Sindbad and his friends saving the 7 Galaxies from disaster, after school.

== Characters ==
- Sindbad: the brown-haired central protagonist of the series. Any time someone says the word "bad" he has to chime in and say "SIND bad"
- Lee: the black-haired robotic (cybernetic organism to be exact) engineer appointed to serve Sindbad
- Zachary Guthrie: the only Earthling member of the crew, who met Sindbad while he was briefly living on Earth. He has blonde hair.
- Lana: a shape-shifter who Sindbad and Zach rescue from her exploding homeworld, as shown in the opening cinematic and a flashback episode. In her humanoid form she has blonde hair like Zach, but can shapeshift into things like a lamp or octopus.

== Broadcast ==
Sindbad is the shortened title used by Toonavision when they began broadcasting it in January 2020. The extended portion of the title "and the seven galaxies" was not included in TV guides.

== Episodes ==
1. The Race
2. Planet Gadget
3. Less is More
4. All Aboard
5. Game On
6. Shapeshifter
7. See the Problem
8. Double Trouble
9. Let's Get Kraken
10. I Lee
11. Trash Planet
12. Smells Like Trouble
13. Team Awesome
14. Space-whale
15. King Zac
16. Top Turtle
17. More Than a Mouthful
18. Stitch in Time
19. Volcano
20. Wink of an Eye
21. The Maltese Kuil
22. Me-Tal Magnet
23. Hot Water
24. The Librarian
25. Stitch in Time
26. Genesis
