= Vme Kids =

American Spanish-language children's television channel

- Country: United States
- Broadcast area: United States
- Headquarters: Miami, Florida

Programming
- Language: Spanish
- Picture format: 1080i HDTV (downscaled to letterboxed 480i for the SDTV feed)

Ownership
- Owner: V-me Media Inc.
- Sister channels: V-me; Primo TV

History
- Launched: September 1, 2010

Links
- Website: vmekids.com

Vme Kids is a Spanish-language children's television channel operated by V-me Media, catering to the needs of preschool-aged Hispanic and Latino Americans. The channel launched exclusively through AT&T U-verse cable systems on September 1, 2010, and has expanded its carriage since then.

== History ==
Seeing a lack of preschool entertainment options for Hispanic children in the United States, V-me Media decided to launch the first 24-hour Spanish-language children's channel in the nation. Utilizing content and experience gained through its daily kids block on V-me, the channel launched on AT&T U-verse on September 1, 2010.
