= The Wild Soccer Bunch =

Children's novels by Joachim Masannek

- Author: Joachim Masannek
- Original title: Die Wilden Fußballkerle
- Illustrator: Jan Birck
- Country: Germany
- Language: German, English
- Genre: Children's fiction
- Media type: Print (hardcover, paperback)
- No. of books: 14

The Wild Soccer Bunch is a series of fourteen children's novels written by the German author Joachim Masannek, who was inspired to write the series during his years as a youth soccer coach. The books, originally written in German and published under the title Die Wilden Fußballkerle, chronicle the adventures of a fictional youth soccer team called The Wild Soccer Bunch. They are illustrated by Jan Birck.

In the English translation of the Wild Soccer Bunch stories, the events take place in a small neighborhood in Chicago.

== Background ==
=== Joachim Masannek ===
Joachim Masannek studied philosophy and German studies at the University of Television and Film Munich. He received awards for In Liebe, Catherine ("In Love, Catherine"), and Der Pampelmusenmod ("The Grapefruit Moon"), films that he produced as a student. After completing his studies, Masannek worked as a cameraman, screenwriter and director for film, television, and studio productions.

Masannek was the coach of a kids' soccer team, which inspired his creation of The Wild Soccer Bunch. His mission is to encourage children worldwide to live by values they learn by playing the game of soccer: courage, teamwork, and friendship. He presently lives in Munich with his sons, Leon and Marlon.

=== Jan Birck ===
Jan Birck began his career as a freelance illustrator in an atelier in Munich, working for renowned advertising agencies. During this time, he and his wife launched Dreamotion Media, a company that develops books, films, and DVDs. Birck has earned his reputation as one of the world's finest illustrators of children's books, with drawings that have appeared in hundreds of publications. He presently lives in Munich with his wife and sons, Timo and Finn.

== Plot ==
In the English translation of the Wild Soccer Bunch stories, the events take place in a small neighborhood in Chicago. The team is made up of a cast of colorful characters, each of them bonded by their passion for soccer. The team plays their beloved game according to five unbreakable rules: "1. Be Wild! 2. Everything’s cool, as long as you’re wild! 3. Never, ever give up! 4. One for all and all for one! 5. Once Wild, always wild!" The logo of the Wild Soccer Bunch is inspired by the original logo created by Masannek's children for their own soccer team.

== Characters ==
=== The Wild Soccer Bunch ===
- Leon the slalom dribbler, goal scorer and flash-pass-goal-preparer (attack): Leon is the leader of the Wild Soccer Bunch and is especially characterized by his will to win, his stubbornness and his loyalty towards the team. Initially, he was more fixed on his personal success. In the first volume, for example, he throws Raban and Joschka off the team, because he thinks they would jeopardize winning against the Unbeatable Winners. At the end of the first volume, however, he realizes that the success of the team is more important to him than his own. On the one hand, his loyalty towards the Wild Soccer Bunch shows through his actions of always trying to help friends and fellow players out of difficult situations and, on the other hand, he has a negative attitude towards new members in the third volume. At first he does not want Vanessa or Deniz in the team until they are able to win him over with the help of a few team members. His big idol is Gerd Müller, whose shirt number 13 Leon is wearing. His best friend is Fabi, they are called the Golden Twins and they often play the attack together.
- Fabi, the fastest right wing in the world (right wing): Fabi is Leon's best friend. Together they are the Golden Twins, the attack and goal machinery of the Wild Soccer Bunch. Unlike Leon, Fabi is already interested in girls. In the eighth volume Fabi is recruited by FC Bayern Munich, but when he realizes how important his friends from the Wild Soccer Bunch are to him, he leaves FC Bayern Munich and the Wild Soccer Bunch wins an important game with his help.
- Marlon, the number 10 (midfield): Marlon is Leon's brother. He is the heart, the soul and the intuition of the team. When Marlon ruptured his cruciate ligament in volume 10, he loses confidence in his soccer career, declaring it to be over. By using a trick, the Wild Soccer Bunch take him to the Team Doctor of FC Bayern Munich where he finds his intuition again. In the same book, Vanessa and Marlon have a crush on each other, which neither wants to admit.
- Raban, the Hero ('Spare-goalscorer'): Raban wears glasses with very think lenses. Without them he basically would be blind which leads to his permanent position on the bench. In volume 6, he asks the great 'Soccer-oracle', if he will ever become a professional player. He is, however, not destined to become a player, but the manager of the Wild Soccer Bunch instead.
- Markus, the Invincible (goalkeeper): Markus lives in a huge house with servant and money. His father wants Markus to play golf instead of soccer, which is why Markus sneaks out to go to soccer practice.
- Juli "Huckleberry" Fort Knox, a four-man backfield defence in one person (defence, last man): Juli plays in the defence and, furthermore, he built the three-level tree house of the Wild Soccer Bunch: Camelot, which is destroyed by Gonzo Gonzales, the head of the flamehats, in volume 9 but is rebuilt afterwards. In volume 4, Juli is blackmailed by 'Fat Michi'. With the help of his friends he escapes the threat and finds his father, who he had not seen in years.
- Joschka, the 7th cavalry (defense, very last man): Joschka is Julis’s youngest brother. On his 7th birthday (Volume 9) he reclaims the Devil’s pot from the flamehats.
- Vanessa, the undaunted (midfield): Vanessa aims to be the first woman on the men’s national soccer team. After she moved from Hamburg to Munich (Volume 3), she not only became a team member of the Wild Soccer Bunch, but also became one of the leaders together with Leon and Fabi.
- Maxi "Tippkick" Maximilian, the man with the most powerful shot in the world (defensive midfield): Maxi doesn't talk. To him soccer means everything, but when it comes to his friends he is willing to sacrifice his freedom by submitting to being grounded for a whole week and being banned completely from playing soccer, even breaking his silence if he needs to.
- Deniz, the loco (striker, in fact everywhere): Deniz is a Turk. During his time with the Wild Soccer Bunch he learns that he needs glasses (Volume 5), that he is not on his own and that friends are way more important than personal victories.
- Jojo who dances with the sun (outside left): Jojo comes from an orphanage. He never owned proper soccer shoes and was playing soccer with patched sandals until he receives some as a gift in Book 11. Apart from that, he also learns that friendship is more important than material possessions.

=== Antagonists ===
- "Gonzo" Gonzales, the pale vampire, is the leader of the flamehats, the skater gang of the boarding school "Nebelburg".
- Fat Michi is the leader of the Unbeatable Winners. Due to the victory of the Wild Soccer Bunch, he became one of their friends even though he is still waiting to finally get his revenge.
- The Beastly Beasts is a girls soccer team from Hamm. They challenged the Wild Soccer Bunch to a match to finally bear the title of "Wildest soccer team in the world". The game ties with 1:1, which results in the Wild Soccer Bunch keeping their title.
- The Silverglades behind the mist live in the fog that is in front of the gates of Ragnarök. The fog comes around every year before the final game of the season. This is also a challenge Leon and the guys gladly accept.
- The Shadow Seekers behind the horizon live in an old metal castle. The Shadow Seekers (Vampires) consist of Darkside, Blossom, Gyroscope, Terry, Mary, Jeckel and Hyde. In the Soccer63D, the Wild Soccer Bunch can not keep up with them, but in the final match, with the support of Maxi and Vanessa as vampires, they achieve victory.
- The fat cousin is the older cousin of fat Michi. He lives in the Black Hills and considers himself the chief of the thieves.
- The Wolves of Ragnarök is a football team that organizes the freestyle soccer contest. They have lived in the forest for three years.

== International success ==
Since the first book was published in 2002, the Wild Soccer Bunch series has gained immense popularity and commercial success in German-speaking countries and around the world. To date, fourteen Wild Soccer Bunch books have been published in 30 countries, and over 9 million copies have been sold. Five live-action feature films have been produced, generating ten million box office admissions in German speaking territories alone.

=== English language edition ===
Five of the books - Kevin the Star Striker, Diego the Tornado, Zoe the Fearless, Julian the Mighty, and Max the Golden Boot - have been translated into English by Helga Schier, PhD, edited by American screenwriter and author Michael Part, and released in the US and Canada by Sole Books. These books are included in the Accelerated Reader program, and each contain a personal message from the American soccer player Landon Donovan, who has officially endorsed the series. Sole Books has offered a free copy of the first book, Kevin the Star Striker, to every school in America.

== Adaptations ==
Joachim Masannek directed a series of six German live-action theatrical films inspired by the novels. The movies were released between 2003 and 2016. The second entry was distributed in the United States by Phase 4 Films in 2011.

A 26-episode animated television series produced by Betafilm began airing in Germany on ZDF beginning May 6, 2012. In the United States, the show started airing on Cartoon Network on October 10, 2012 and later on Primo TV on April 25, 2017.
