= AI Football GGO =

Chinese animation television series

- English-language promotional poster (From Right to left is:Myth, Nucleus, Satellite, Swift, Titan and Shadow.)
- Genre: Science fiction Sports; Comedy
- Directed by: Gordon Chin
- Theme music composer: Xiao Xu Music, Johnny Njo
- Opening theme: "AI Football Evolution" by The Super VC, "You Gotta Play to Win" by Neal Coomer, "Let's Goal" by ToNick (Cantonese version)
- Ending theme: "Fight Back" by Xiao Xu Music
- Country of origin: China
- Original languages: Chinese, English
- No. of seasons: 2
- No. of episodes: 104

Production
- Producer: Gordon Chin
- Running time: 22 minutes
- Production companies: Puzzle Animation Studio, Ltd.

Original release
- Network: CCTV
- Release: 2 June 2010 – 2019

Artificial Intelligent Football GGO (Chinese: 超智能足球; pinyin: Chāo Zhìnéng Zúqiú; lit. 'Super Intelligent Football'), also known as GGO Football, is a Chinese animated television series produced by Puzzle Animation Studio Ltd. The story centers on high schooler Isaac and his friends as they compete in advanced robotic football tournament.

It aired on CCTV, China, in July 2010 during the World Cup, and was then distributed by Asia Animation Ltd. to Asia, Europe, Australia, and the Americas. Before the 2010 World Cup began, however, the English dub for AI Football GGO first aired on E.tv, South Africa, between June 2, 2010, and June 2011.

In 2018, the second season of AI Football GGO, officially called GGO Football 2: World Tournament (Chinese: 超智能足球2 世界大赛篇; pinyin: Chāo Zhìnéng Zúqiú 2 Shìjiè Dàsài Piān; lit. 'Super Intelligent Football 2 World Championship'), began airing in China.

== Plot ==
In the 21st century, the relationship between sports and technology is getting closer to the point where human testing alone couldn't catch up with the greatly fluctuating standards. As more human footballers retire due to irrecoverable injuries, people start finding a way so everyone can still enjoy football games. Among them, a research consultant only known as Professor GGO proposes an idea: a palm sized football robot with artificial intelligence. People are amused by the brilliant idea, and soon after, the development of the robots becomes the world's newest trend.

Two years prior of the beginning of the series, Dr. Coleman, a technical consultant of GGO Football Association, set a counter strategy to stop his fellow biologist, Dr. Stan, from doing inhumane experiments for his own domination. However, while developing a new generation footballer programmed to cease Stan's plan, Professor GGO disappeared. Discovering this, Coleman split his research data and stored a half into the footballer, whose then he sent to Shanghai. He hoped that his good friend, Ball, could find a perfect person to "manage" the footballer and reach the World Tournament.

One day in Shanghai, Coleman's son Isaac accidentally found a footballer named Myth at Ball's seafood stall. He later discovered that Myth had a hard mission to carry. He was frustrated that his father didn't trust him and decided to prove himself by his skill. He decided to form a team with his classmates and start their pursuit into the tournament.

== Characters ==
=== Barefoot ===
A competing team representing China in GGO National Tournament. They are the champion of GGO National Tournament this year. They also won the GGO Continental Tournament and obtain the qualification to participate in the GGO World Tournament. Team Captains are Isaac, Shawn, Karl, Timmy, Cat and later Oscar. Their football skills are varied, always keeping a balance between offense and defense. With teamwork, they can always keep fighting until the end. They keep growing in GGO Football. They don't have a special formation that they only use, but often vary depending on their opponent.

- Isaac (Chinese: 高迅; pinyin: Gāo Xùn): The main protagonist. 13 years old, Shanghainese, in his first year of secondary school. He is the overall Captain of team Barefoot and also the only child of Dr. Coleman, one of the three GGO Chief Designers. He lost his mother when he was very young, and grew up with his father and aunt. He inherited a love and talent for engineering, technology and physics from his father, and he is a superb GGO controller. Like his father, he likes wearing slippers. In GGO matches, he prefers playing offensively. He is a bit arrogant, often underestimates his rivals, but very determined to win. When his team are losing or being challenged hard, it is easy to see that he is quite anxious as he twirls a pen incessantly. When he comes across very strong opponents, he will often use strange and very creative ways to overcome the odds Isaac is able to emerge victoriously. Controller of Team Barefoot's striker Myth.
- Shawn (Chinese: 简•奥尼; pinyin: Jiǎn ào ní): 14 years old, half Italian half German, in 8th grade at an international school in Shanghai. He is a good-looking boy, comes from a family steeped in the arts. His father is a literary giant and his mother is a maestro conductor. Influenced by his parents, he has high expectations of his lifestyle. He is calm, does not often express what he really feels, and sometimes comes across wrongly as a proud, arrogant person. After meeting Barefoot's teammate, he is opened up a little bit. In GGO matches, he is a strong, steady defender. At every match, he always has a bottle of iced water nearby to help him think calmly – how much iced water depends on how good he thinks his opponents are. He is trying to know more about GGO Football and his parents preferred him to become a musician but when he saw Barefoot he preferred to play GGO Football. Controller of Team Barefoot's captain Nucleus and goalkeeper Shadow.
- Karl (Chinese: 花王; pinyin: Huā Wáng): 13 years old, Shanghainese, in first year at secondary school, he is also one of Isaac's childhood friends.as he's more closer to Timmy . He loves to take risks, has a gambler's personality, but never gambles money, only his fate. He always has a lucky coin with him – when he cannot decide on something, he will take out the coin and the issue will be settled by heads or tails. Karl is a bit short, in order to make himself stand out, his hairstyle and clothes are always quite loud. He is very quick-minded, open to change for working out new strategies. He is a loyal friend and always keeps his word. In GGO matches, Karl controls Satellite, Team Barefoot's winger – the perfect position for an opportunist.
- Timmy (Chinese: 肥宝; pinyin: Féi Bǎo): 13 years old, Shanghainese, in first year at secondary school. He is a childhood friend of Isaac's and is a chubby little boy who is honest, responsible, and easily content. He eats a lot of sandwiches but Karl scolds him but he loves to eat more. He has his principles, works methodically, and does not like people who try to walk before they learn to crawl. Timmy loves hotdogs and sandwiches, and always carries ketchup, mustard and relish with him. He does not have much ambition and he just wants to go to university, but after entering the GGO competition and with Isaac's influence, he is beginning to think about what his life goals are. In GGO matches, he is a responsible and hardworking defender. He is not particularly talented and is a little insecure, but his hard work makes up for it. Because he is used to failure, he does not let it depress him, and in fact, he is always looking for lessons to be learnt in everything. Controller of Team Barefoot's defender Titan.
- Kat (Chinese: 猫猫; pinyin: Māo Māo): 14 years old, Shanghainese, in first year at secondary school – she is a classmate of Isaac and his friends. She is a typical girl who likes to dress up and look pretty. She takes baking classes from Aunt Betty, Isaac's aunt, and at the same time she also absorbs Betty's quick-temper. She did not have much interest in GGO at first, proclaiming herself the manager of their GGO team and even buys a brand new GGO footballer. She works hard to learn more about GGO football as she has a crush on Shawn too. Controller of Team Barefoot's Sweeper Swift.
- Oscar (Chinese: 杨聪; pinyin: Yáng Cōng): 13 years old, Shanghainese, in first year of secondary school. Was originally part of Team Protector, but when Shawn went back to Vienna at the end of the 4 Nations Charity Tournament he joined Team Barefoot to compete with them in the GGO World Cup Qualifying to play against teams of Asia, in Shawn's place. He lacked confidence and always worries to drag his brothers down when he was with Team Protector but has since turned to be a calm and defensive controller. Controller of Team Barefoot's secondary goalkeeper Shield.

==== Footballers ====
- Myth (Chinese: 潜龙; pinyin: Qián lóng): Striker of Team Barefoot, number 11. Extremely skillful at threading the ball, he is very adept at faking moves to get past his opponents, his scoring angles are extremely precise. Because he is the latest version of GGO Footballer, there are times when his AI system does not function properly. The groundbreaking element is that he has his own emotions, but in times of crisis, Myth is able to step up and play at a higher level than the rest. This is something that resembles Isaac very much. Special skills are the Accelerate Dribble, Subsonic Dribble, Roaring Flame Strike, Radiant Roaring Flame Strike, Roaring Flame Overhead Strike, Radiant Roaring Flame Overhead Strike, Vacuum Zero Strike, Phantom Radiant Roaring Flame Strike (A move used with Darkness), Roaring Flame Header (A move used with Titan), and Lava Block (Note: only Roaring Flame Strike, Radiant Roaring Flame Strike, Accelerate Dribble, and Subsonic Dribble were seen before playing Team Bio, and Vacuum Zero Strike and Lava Block can only be used with Human-Robot Merge). He was created by Dr. Coleman and Professor GGO as a prototype of a 7th generation GGO footballer, in order to stop Dr. Stan's conspiracy.
- Satellite (Chinese: 流星; pinyin: Liúxīng): Winger of Team Barefoot, number 7. Super fast, remarkably accurate passing, loves to use complicated footwork that throws off his opponents. With so much understanding between himself and his teammates, he is often able to fool the opponents. Special skills are the Gravity Dribble, Satellite Orbit Dribble, Satellite Dribble, Gemini Strike, Gravity Bulldozer Tackle (a skill he uses with Titan), Gravity Omnidirectional Cruiser Tackle, a move he uses with Titan and Nucleus, and Titan-Satellite Hammer (a skill he also uses with Titan with Human-Robot Merge). He is taller than Swift, Myth and Nucleus.
- Swift (Chinese: 疾电; pinyin: Jí diàn): Sweeper of Team Barefoot, number 18. He is not very strong in terms of fitness, but very quick in acceleration, one of the quickest GGO footballers in Shanghai. He often makes great steals on the pitch and therefore is known as the "Pitch Pickpocket". He does not seem to be a very focused footballer usually, but when he gets serious, he has the determination and will of steel. Special skills are the Blast Elastico, Dashing Dribble, Zero Strike, Two-phase dribble (with Satellite), Carp Vertical Spin, and double gemini strike (with Satellite) . Swift is an anti-social GGO footballer, He does not talk a lot with the other GGO footballers of his team. He is shorter than Satellite, Shadow and Titan.
- Nucleus (Chinese: 核能; pinyin: Hénéng): Captain and Defensive Midfielder of Team Barefoot, number 10. He is an all rounded midfielder with equal ability to attack and defend. Calm, persevering, with very strong leadership skills and an ability to make peace between quarrelling teammates. Special skills are the Omni Directional Dribble, Omni Directional Strike, Omni Directional Tackle, Omni Directional Pass, Gravity Omnidirectional Cruiser Tackle, a move he uses with Titan and Satellite, and Aerial Omnidirectional Tackle.
- Titan (Chinese: 铁甲; pinyin: Tiějiǎ): Center Back of Team Barefoot, number 4. Big, strong, tall and yet very quick on his feet (this is one of the factors that Timmy places most importance on as, in real life, Timmy himself is rather clumsy on his feet). Particularly good at getting in the right physical spot in both attack and defense, and with superior header skills. He is a 100% committed and responsible footballer. Special skills are the Bulldozer Tackle, Cruiser Tackle, Cruise Missile Strike, Gravity Bulldozer Tackle, a skill he uses with Satellite, Gravity Cruiser Tackle a move he uses with Satellite, Gravity Omnidirectional Cruiser Tackle, a move he uses with Nucleus and Satellite, Roaring Flame Header, a move used with Myth, and Titan Satellite Hammer, a skill he also uses with Satellite with Human-Robot Merge.
- Shadow (Chinese: 影眼; pinyin: Yǐng yǎn): Goalkeeper of Team Barefoot, number 1. He has excellent strength in jumps, reacts exceedingly quickly, and most importantly he is able to read the game very well. Although he comes off as very stubborn, he always listens and defers to Shawn's judgement. He has never once argued with Shawn. His special skill is the Shadow Save and Phantom Save. (Phantom Save can only be used with Human-Robot Merge). Originally the goalkeeper of Perseus, Shadow was disowned and damaged by his original owner Laurie due to his disobedience, and was later adopted by Shawn.
- Shield (Chinese: 战盾; pinyin: Zhàn dùn): Goalkeeper of Team Barefoot, number 12. When he joined Team Barefoot at first he was not very confident, but then showed determination and turned out to be a calm, accurate goalkeeper, something that resembled Oscar. He can also play in field on defense, His special skills are the Mighty Block (as goalkeeper, Mighty Block (as centreback), and Reverse Pass (as centreback).

=== Perseus ===
A competing team in GGO Regional Tournament. They created the 38-winning streak in GGO regional game. Team Captains are Shawn and Emmett, before the former joining Barefoot.

==== Controllers ====
- Emmett (Chinese: 艾姆; pinyin: Ài mǔ): 14 years old, Controller of Cobra, Mustang and Glide. He is confident and strong adaptability. He is a good friend and partner with Shawn and they created the 38 winning streak in GGO regional game. After Shawn decides to join Barefoot, Emmett returns to Germany and singlehandedly manages Team Perseus.

==== Footballers ====
- Cobra (Chinese: 眼镜蛇; pinyin: Yǎnjìngshé): Captain and Striker/Winger of Team Perseus, number 11.
- Nucleus (Chinese: 核能; pinyin: Hénéng): Defensive midfielder of Team Perseus, number 10.
- Mustang (Chinese: 野马; pinyin: Yěmǎ): Centre back of Team Perseus, number 5.
- Glide (Chinese: 滑翔; pinyin: Huáxiáng): Centre back of Team Perseus, number 4.
- Shadow (Chinese: 影眼; pinyin: Yǐng yǎn): Goalkeeper of Team Perseus, number 1

=== Mirror ===
GGO China National Tournament semi-finalist. Team Captain is Mike. With flexible football skills, teamwork, and successful execution of strategies, they destroy the opponent's defense. One of their strategies is the Illusion Attack Formation.

==== Controller ====
- Mike (连城): The Captain of Team Mirror. He has a clear mind and strong will in GGO Football. Controller of all the Team Mirror's players.

==== Footballers ====
- Leader (雷霆): Captain and Striker of Team Mirror, number 10. His special skills are Vortex Strike and Vortex Pass.
- Skynet (天网): Winger of Team Mirror, number 9. His special skills are Vortex Strike and Vortex Pass.
- Spin (旋风): Midfielder of Team Mirror, number 8. His special skills are Vortex Strike and Vortex Pass.
- Blast (迅雷): Centre back of Team Mirror, number 3. His special skills are Vortex Strike and Vortex Pass.
- Reflex (反射): Goalkeeper of Team Mirror, number 1. A decent Goalkeeper with good goalkeeping skills.

=== Hornet ===
A competing team in the GGO National Tournament. Team Captains are Philip and Van - Father and Son. Their fast movements in the game are like a swarm of bees. Specializes in the Swarm Triangle Formation.

==== Controllers ====
- Philip (聂天高): One of the controllers of Team Hornet. He participates in GGO Football Tournament to find his missing son, Van. Controller of all the Team Hornet's players.
- Van (聂小华): One of the controllers of Team Hornet. He runs away from home because his father does not allow him to play GGO Football. Controller of all the Team Hornet's players.

==== Footballers ====
- Sprint (冲锋): Captain and Striker of Team Hornet, number 3. Good at beating the defender with his speed. Cooperates well with the other Hornets, Blade and Jet. His special skills are Double Shadow Swarm Attack and Treble Shadow Swarm Attack.
- Blade (冷锋): Winger of Team Hornet, number 6. Good at beating the defender with his speed. Cooperates well with the other Hornet's striker, Sprint and Jet. His special skill is Double Shadow Swarm Attack.
- Jet (破锋): Winger of Team Hornet, number 9. Good at beating the defender with his speed. Cooperates well with the other Hornet's striker, Sprint and Blade. His special skill is Double Shadow Swarm Attack.
- Needle (刺针): Centre Back of Team Hornet, number 5. A decent Centre Back with good defensive skill. His special skill is Hornet Sting Tackle.
- Hive (蜂巢): Goalkeeper of Team Hornet, number 1.

=== Protector ===
A competing team in the GGO National Tournament. Team Captains are the five Young Brothers, the oldest four being identical quadruplets. They are good at defense and counter-attack. Special skills are Absolute Defense and Mid-Air Tactics.

==== Controllers ====
- Marcus (杨文): One of the controllers of Team Protector. He loves his brothers and does not allow anyone to speak ill of his brother, Oscar. Controller of all the Team Protector's players except Oscar's player Shield.
- Justus (杨武): One of the controllers of Team Protector. He loves his brothers and does not allow anyone to speak ill of his brother, Oscar. Controller of all the Team Protector's players except Oscar's player Shield.
- Rufus (杨英): One of the controllers of Team Protector. He loves his brothers and does not allow anyone to speak ill of his brother, Oscar. Controller of all the Team Protector's players except Oscar's player Shield.
- Cyrus (杨杰): One of the controllers of Team Protector. He loves his brothers and does not allow anyone to speak ill of his brother, Oscar. Controller of all the Team Protector's players except Oscar's player Shield.
- Oscar (杨聪):Controller the player Shield, who later sides with Barefoot. [8]

==== Footballers ====
- Highlander (空中霸王): Captain and Attacking Midfielder of Team Protector, number 10. Responsible for scoring. Good at personal techniques and beating the defender with his speed.
- Invincible (御军): Centre Back of Team Protector, number 4. Cooperates well with the other Protectors defender, Damage and Stopper. Good at defensive skill to strive for victory.
- Damage (破裂): Centre Back of Team Protector, number 5. Cooperates well with the other Protectors defender, Invincible and Stopper. Good at defensive skill to strive for victory.
- Stopper (截击): Centre Back of Team Protector, number 6. Cooperates well with the other Protectors defender, Invincible and Damage. Good at defensive skill to strive for victory.
- Blocker (封阻): Goalkeeper of Team Protector, number 17. A decent replacement player of Shield.
- Shield (战盾): Goalkeeper of Team Protector, number 1. His special skill is the Mighty Block.

=== Magical Illusion ===
A competing team knocked out in the round of 16 in the China GGO National Tournament by Barefoot. Team Captains are William and Willy. Their football skills are aggressive. In order to win, they always use foul strategies without hesitation. One player would block the electronic referee's view and another player would foul the opponent. Although there are three electronic referees in a game the other two have not got a wide enough camera to see the foul and give a yellow or red card.

==== Controllers ====
- William (威廉): Magician, one of the Controllers of Team Magical Illusion. He is determined to win in any way, especially fouls. Controller of all the Team Magical Illusion's players.
- Willy (威利): Magician, one of the Controllers of Team Magical Illusion. He is determined to win in any way, especially fouls. Controller of all the Team Magical Illusion's players.

==== Footballers ====
- Flint (火石): Winger and captain of Team Magical Illusion, number 6. Good at blocking opponents' attack by professional foul. His special skill is Sparkling Strike.
- Sparks (火花): Winger of Team Magical Illusion, number 9. Good at blocking opponents' attack by professional foul. His special skill is Sparkling Strike.
- Bomber (轰炸): Centre Back of Team Magical Illusion, number 11. Good at blocking opponents' attack by professional foul.
- Mess (毁坏): Centre Back of Team Magical Illusion, number 2. Good at blocking opponents' attack by professional foul.
- Wizard (巫师): Goalkeeper of Team Magical Illusion, number 1. A decent Goalkeeper with good goalkeeping skills.

=== Sky-Wheels ===
GGO National Tournament quarter-finalist, knocked out by Team Barefoot. Team Captains are Carmen and Nicholas. They persist in scoring even when they are trailing.

==== Controllers ====
- Carmen (卓凤): 15 years old, since her father died, she has taken care of her younger brother by herself. She joins the GGO national tournament for the prize money, so that she can continue to run the cart noodle stall which is the legacy of her father.
- Nicholas (卓龙): 13 years old, the main controller of Team Sky-wheels. He enjoys being alone. He is good at dealing with adversity and always keeps calm during matches.

==== Footballers ====
- Clone (复刻): Captain and Striker of Team Sky-wheels, number 10. An important member in the team who's responsible to score in match. His special skill is copying, learning from the opponents, an eye for an eye. Although he can clone any special skill he still runs out of energy.
- Seep (渗透): Winger of Team Sky-wheels, number 11.
- Hawk (猎鹰): Winger of Team Sky-wheels, number 9.
- Axe (战斧): Centre back of Team Sky-wheels, number 2.
- Mask (铁面): Goalkeeper of Team Sky-wheels, number 1.

=== Wolf Army ===
GGO National Tournament semi-finalist, knocked out by Team Barefoot. Champion of the last GGO National Tournament. Team Captains are General Clark, Major General Paul and Major Given. As the name suggests, the team is as disciplined as an army and as savage as a wolf. Well known for their Normandy Formation and Sniper Track Formation.

==== Controllers ====
- General Clark (古勒上将): 45 years old, Veteran, the controller of Team Wolf Army. He has 6 years experience in playing GGO Football. National champion of last year.
- Major General Paul (保罗少将): 33 years old, Veteran, the controller of Team Wolf Army. He has 6 years experience in playing GGO Football.
- Major Given (基荣少校): 23 years old, Veteran, the controller of Team Wolf Army. He has 6 years experience in playing GGO Football.

==== Footballers ====
- Cannon (重炮): Captain and Sweeper of Team Wolf Army, number 10. His special skill is the Sniper Strike, shooting a football like a bullet.
- Missile (导弹): Sweeper of Team Wolf Army, number 8. His special skill is the Missile Strike, attacking from the air.
- Torpedo (鱼雷): Sweeper of Team Wolf Army, number 5. His special skill is the Torpedo Strike, changing the direction while shooting.
- Trinity (司令): Midfielder of Team Wolf Army, number 9. His special skill is the Sniper Track, finding the best shooting angle for his teammates.
- Radar (雷达): Goalkeeper of Team Wolf Army, number 1.

=== The Name of Devils ===
GGO National Tournament finalist. Runners up to Team Barefoot. Team Captains are Tyrant and his four assistants. Their football skills already meet the world-class standard. After the Devil's training, all the footballers are technically and physically far better than normal footballers.

==== Controllers ====
- Tyrant (烈巴男爵): 17 years old, English nobility. Tyrant is disdainful of school – instead he receives personal tutoring in his castle. Never seen without his shades, he has a cold half-smile that can chill one's heart and he never lets anyone know what he is thinking. Tyrant has a mean, sinister personality – he will do anything to win and never lets up against his opponents. He strongly believes that everything in the world can be bought. In GGO matches, Tyrant is an all-round controller, his defense and offence are equally strong. In terms of his GGO controlling skills, he is exceptional, even more efficient than both Isaac and Shawn. The four guys who work under him to form the team were all bought for a high price. None of them have names but numbers that Tyrant gave to them.
- Laurie/010 (霍雷特/010): One of the controllers of Team The Name of Devils, controller of Darkness & Prosecutor. Ex-controller of Shadow. He was bought by Tyrant by a high price and named 010. He is very arrogant and thinks his orders are never wrong. Once in a friendly against Shawn's old team Perseus he was 4-0 up. But in the last minute Nucleus was through on goal and Laurie told Shadow, who was with Laurie at that time, to go and smother the ball. Shadow thought Nucleus was going to pass so he hesitated. Laurie still told Shadow to go out but when he did Nucleus passed and Cobra made it 4–1 in the last second. Shawn told Laurie that if he had not told Shadow to leave his goal then they would have won 4–0. Laurie insisted that it was Shadow's fault and that his orders were never wrong and threw Shadow against a wall, damaging his left eye, and left. Shawn picked Shadow up, took him home, fixed his eye as well as he could and the two have never been apart in any GGO match.
- 91 (91): One of the controllers of Team The Name of Devils, controller of Destroyer. He works under Tyrant and he gave the number 91 to him.
- 13 (13): One of the controllers of Team The Name of Devils, controller of Cracker. He works under Tyrant and he gave the number 13 to him.
- 66 (66): One of the controllers of Team The Name of Devils, controller of Exterminate. He works under Tyrant and he gave the number 66 to him.

==== Footballers ====
- Darkness (黑帝): Striker of Team The Name of Devils, number 0. All-rounded technique, possessing the best fitness and technical skill in all of Shanghai. His skills are Phantom Twister Strike, Phantom Roaring Flame Strike, Third-eye Strike, Phantom Twister Dribble, Whirl Breaker, Stealth Strike, Storm Dragon Blast, Phantom Power Wall, Evil Dribble, and Phantom Radiant Roaring Flame Strike, a move he uses with Myth. (Storm Dragon Blast is only used with Human-Robot Merge).
- Cracker (爆破): Winger of Team The Name of Devils, number 13. Second fastest player in Shanghai, only losing to Team Barefoot's Swift and named The King of Dribbling. Special Skill is the Phantom Shadow Dribble
- Exterminate (歼灭): Captain and Defensive midfielder of Team The Name of Devils, number 66. His skills are Phantom Diving Tackle, and Phantom Curve.
- Destroyer (破坏): Centre back of Team The Name of Devils, number 29. Big and tall but also extremely quick, his accurate and ruthless defense work successfully stops his opponents. His skills include Phantom Sickle Tackle, a move with many stages, The stages of this move used were Phantom Sickle Tackle, Phantom Sickle Tackle 2nd phase, and Phantom Sickle dribble 10th phase. (Phantom Sickle dribble 10th phase was used with Human-Robot Merge).
- Prosecutor (盖世太保): Goalkeeper of Team The Name of Devils, number 1. Great saving skills, can easily save any types of goals. His skills are Eradicator Hand, Mercury Golden Arms, and Super Eradicator Punch. (Super Eradicator punch is used with Human-Robot Merge).

=== Samba ===
Brazil's Team Samba are the champions of the world three times in a row.

==== Controllers ====
- Dimero（迪美奥）: 14 years old, the main controller of Brazil's Team Samba, a professional footballer. He has 3 years' experience in playing GGO. Controller of Striker Extreme and keeper Twister.
- Gardo（加度）: 15 years old, controller of Brazil's Team Samba, a professional footballer. He has 3 years' experience in playing GGO. Controller of Midfielders Synchronizer and Freezer.
- Neo（里奥）: 15 years old, controller of Brazil's Team Samba, a professional footballer. He has 3 years' experience in playing GGO. Controller of Centre Back Steel

==== Footballers ====
- Extreme（无极）: Captain and Striker of Brazil's Team Samba, number 9. Having played in numerous big games, he has matured into one of the cleverest footballers. His attributes are top class, whether it is dribbling skills, shot accuracy, dribbling speed or body balance. He is one of the brightest stars in GGO Football. His special skills are Projectile Bouncing Strike, Lobster-tail Bicycle Kick, Samba Banana Strike, Shadowless Windbreaker Strike, Zero Gravity: Shadowless Windbreaker Strike, Shadowless Windbreaker Tackle, Zero Gravity: Shadowless Windbreaker Tackle. He played in team bio in the last episode
- Synchronizer（圣极龙）: Midfielder of Team Samba, number 10. He is very stubborn and confident. Also extremely powerful with his special skills of Secret Seal, Zero Gravity: Secret Seal, Secret Advancement and Zero Gravity: Secret Advancement
- Freezer（飞沙）: Midfielder of Team Samba, number 20. His special skills are, Sandstorm Tackle, Zero Gravity: Sandstorm Tackle, and Sandstorm Dribble
- Steel（钢铁）: Centre Back of Brazil's Team Samba, number 6. His special skills are the Samba Magic Pass, Immediate Counter-offensive Tackle, Steel Missile Strike, Zero Gravity: Steel Missile Strike, and Zero Gravity: Sudden Tackle. Although playing as a defender, his dribbling skills are one of the best. He played in team bio in the last episode
- Twister（龙卷）: Goalkeeper of Brazil's Team Samba, number 00. Although he has only got one arm, his Spinning save is an exceptional goalkeeping skill. He played in team bio in the last episode

=== Lions ===
A competing team representing England in GGO International Challenge Cup. Finalist of the last GGO World Tournament. Team Captains are Nelson and Barth. Their football skills are solid and well coordinated. They specialize in using data and statistics to estimate opponents' next actions. Famous for their "Crescent Wall Formation" and "Mirror Crescent Wall Formation.

==== Controllers ====
- Nelson（尼尔逊）: 47 years old, one of the controllers of England's Team Lions, Tyrant's uncle, and a former football player. He has 5 years' experience in playing GGO Football.
- Barth（巴菲斯）: 40 years old, one of the controllers of England's Team Lions. He has 6 years' experience in playing GGO Football. He always carries a notebook to calculate the possibilities of victory.

==== Footballers ====
- Roar（狮吼）: The Striker of England's Team Lions, number 9. His special skills are the Crescent Pass, Inner Crescent Strike, Crescent Tackle, Crescent Strike, Powerful Header, and Plenilune Swinging Tackle.
- Meniscus（新月）: captain and the Midfielder of England's Team Lions, number 23. His special skills are the Crescent Pass, and Crescent Dribble.
- Arrow（穿云箭）: Winger of England's Team Lions, number 7. His special skills are the Crescent Pass, Crescent Swinging Tackle and Plenilune Swinging Tackle.
- Fort（城堡）: Centre Back of England's Team Lions, number 5. His special skills are the Crescent Swinging Tackle, Outer Crescent Strike, Crescent Dribble, Crescent Pass, and Crescent Strike.
- Rock（金汤）: Goalkeeper of England's Team Lions, number 1. His special moves are the Crescent Pass and Crescent Save.
- Darkness (黑帝): Striker of Team The Name of Devils, number 0. All-rounded technique, possessing the best fitness and technical skill in all of Shanghai. His skills are Phantom Twister Strike, Phantom Roaring Flame Strike, Third-eye Strike, Phantom Twister Dribble, Whirl breaker, Stealth Strike, Storm Dragon Blast, Phantom Power Wall, Monster Dribble, and Phantom Radiant Roaring Flame Strike, a move he uses with Myth. (Storm Dragon blast is only used with Human-Robot Merge).
- Prosecutor (盖世太保): Goalkeeper of Team The Name of Devils, number 1. Great saving skills, can easily save any types of goals. His skills are Eradicator Hand, Mercury Golden Arms, and Super Eradicator punch. (Super Eradicator punch is used with Human-Robot Merge).

=== Tango ===
A competing team representing Argentina in GGO International Challenge Cup. Team Captain is Consalis. Their football skills seem gentle but actually powerful. They always attack smoothly with cooperation. Specialize in Tango Rose Formation and Blooming Rose Formation.

==== Controller ====
- Consalis（干沙利斯）: The controller of Argentina's Team Tango. He is a confident dancer and a perfectionist. Anything not perfect he would either do again to make perfect or throw away.

==== Footballers ====
- Centron（核心）: Striker of Argentina's Team Tango, number 10. He is the heart of the Argentina team. He is the architect of all of the team's offensive and defensive moves. He is the perfect footballer with no flaw, whether it's skills, lower body power, power or offensive and defensive awareness. His special skills are the Poison Ivy Tackle, Rose Dribble and Pollen Strike.
- Dagger（尖刀）: Captain and Attacking Midfielder of Argentina's Team Tango, number 11. His special skills are the Poison Ivy Tackle and Poison Ivy Pass.
- Red Sword（恕剑）: Defensive midfielder of Argentina's Team Tango, number 4. His special skills are the Poison Ivy Tackle and Poison Ivy Pass.
- Vine（蔓藤）: Wing Back of Argentina's Team Tango, number 3. His special skills are the Poison Ivy Tackle and Poison Ivy Pass.
- Thorn（荆棘）: Goalkeeper of Argentina's Team Tango, number 1.

=== Birds ===
A competing team representing Japan in GGO Continental Tournament. They have continually obtained the qualification in the GGO World Tournament for eight years. Team Captains are Hatori and Hasegawa. Players are good at offensive skills.

==== Controllers ====
- Hatori（火野雄一）: 30 years old, one of the controllers of Japan's Team Birds. He was a kendo coach and he has 12 years' experience in playing GGO Football.
- Hasegawa（渡三郎）: 13-year-old student, one of the controllers of Japan's Team Birds. He has 2 years' experience in playing GGO Football.

==== Footballers ====
- Claw（鹰爪）: Striker of Japan's Team Birds, number 9. His special skill is the Eagles Strike.
- Phoenix（凤凰）: Winger of Japan's Team Birds, number 7. His special skill is the Eagles Strike.
- Jetfire（天火）: Winger of Japan's Team Birds, number 12. His special skill is the Eagles Strike.
- Falcon（隼）: Captain and Free Role of Japan's Team Birds, number 10. His special skills are the Falcon Wings Tackle, Falcon Gliding Pass, Kendo Dual Tackle and Eagles Strike. Known as the best all-rounder, contributes to both offense and defense.
- Iron Wing（铁羽）: Goalkeeper of Japan's Team Birds, number 1.

=== Dohago ===
A competing team representing Singapore in GGO Continental Tournament. Team Captain is Louis. An offensive team but relatively weak in defense. Famous for their Fire Lion Claw Attack Formation.

==== Controller ====
- Louis（范帅）: 28 years old, Tailor, the controller of Team Dohago. He has 3 years' experience in playing GGO Football.

==== Footballers ====
- Erosion（侵蚀）: Striker of Team Dohago, number 5. Attack from the air with Thunder to double the power.
- Thunder（悍雷）: Striker of Team Dohago, number 4. Attack from the air with Erosion to double the power.
- Electrolyte（电极）: Captain and Midfielder of Team Dohago, number 10. His special skill Lion Claw Tackle, blocking opponents from going forward.
- Flame（火焰）: Centre Back of Team Dohago, number 3.
- Sealer（冻结）: Goalkeeper of Team Dohago, number 1.

=== Sura ===
A competing team representing Shallowsania in Asia in GGO Continental Tournament. Team Captain is Alpha Hart, later revealed to actually be Nicholas, the Ex-Controller of team Sky Wheels when he takes off his mask. Every member of the team wears a mask. Thus, no one knows the genuine identity of the team. Specializes in Sura Devil Formation.

==== Controller ====
- Alpha Hart/Nicholas（阿力步化哈慈/卓龙）: No one knows the real identity of this controller. Only little information showing that he comes from a mysterious island in Asia, later revealed to be Nicholas, one of the controllers knocked out by Barefoot in the China National GGO tournament in the quarter finals, who was later recruited by Agent KA to get revenge on Barefoot.

==== Footballers ====
- Clone（复刻）: Captain and Striker of Team Sura, number 10. Mainly responsible for scoring. His special skill is the Sura Strike, later the Sura Roaring Flame Strike when he clones the Roaring Flame Strike from Myth. He also leads the Sura attack Formation. A former player in Team Sky-Wheels.
- Dark Satellite（克隆流星）: Winger of Team Sura, number 7. A duplicated version of Satellite in Team Barefoot. Can clone any skill that Satellite does.
- Dark Swift（克隆疾电）: Sweeper of Team Sura, number 18. A duplicated version of Swift in Team Barefoot. Can clone any skill that Swift does.
- Dark Titan（克隆铁甲）: Centre Back of Team Sura, number 4. A duplicated version of Titan in Team Barefoot. Can clone any skill that Titan does.
- Dark Nucleus（克隆核能）: Defensive Midfielder of Team Sura, number 0. A duplicated version of Nucleus in Team Barefoot. Can clone any skill that Nucleus does.
- Dark Shield（克隆战盾）: Goalkeeper of Team Sura, number 1. A duplicated version of Shield in Team Barefoot. Can clone any skill that Shield does.
- Dark Shadow（克隆影眼）: Goalkeeper of Team Sura, number 88. A duplicated version of Shadow in Team Barefoot. Can clone any skill that Shadow does.

=== BIO ===
A team which was formed by Dr. Stan and Agent KA, in order to achieve world domination by using stolen GGO players and their data, in their final plan to rule the world using BIO troopers.

==== Controllers ====
- Dr. Stan（史坦尼亞）: The main antagonist. He is one of the chief designers of GGO technology and a former colleague of Dr. Coleman, who attempted to use artificial intelligence to surpass human players and experimented on human players to create the ultimate GGO footballer, so he can achieve more data to conquer the world. Controller of Bio-Myth.
- Agent KA (卡先生) : Around 30 years old, he is a mysterious figure who often appears at GGO tournaments. Actually, he is one of Dr. Stan’s Shanghai subordinates. When watching GGO matches, he constantly looks for the top GGO players and controllers for his master to use. He often wears a cold and arrogant smile whilst smoking his pipe. He wears a ring that has his initials.

== Human-Robot Merge ==
The Human-Robot Merge is introduced in Season 2 when Isaac had a very brief dream before the final match with Samba about his dad that was not specific at all. Later during the match with Samba, Isaac was able to remember the rest of his fathers instructions and was able to accomplish it.

The Human-Robot Merge occurs when Controller and Players hearts, feelings, and thoughts match and synchronize. When this happens, a resonance is formed which powers the Player with incredible strength. However, this mentally and physically hurts the controller a lot, often resulting in headaches, falling to the ground, and sweating. l So far, the only people who can accomplish the Human-Robot merge are Isaac, Shawn, Karl, Timmy, and Tyrant. The power of the Human-Robot Merge is uncontrollable, that is why only 7th Generation GGO Footballers like Myth can use it without any harm to the player. If a 6th Generation player uses it, the player after a short time will self destruct and be irrecoverable.

== Absolute Bioization ==
In season 2, Dr. Stan was able to steal a report about the 7th generation GGO Football created by Dr. GGO and Dr. Coleman from Isaac, with this report, he was able to merge it with his human biology report to create 7th generation Bio Players and a super AI that was able to download the information about Myth and the other players who used Human-Robot Merge and he was able to create his own version of it called Absolute Bioization that only works on 7th Generation Bio players. As more and more information is gathered and downloaded about Human-Robot Merge, Absolute Bioization grows even more powerful. It is a very dangerous invention and was used by Dr. Stan to power his players against Team Barefoot in the 2nd Season. He also wanted to use it to power and sync with his robot army to take over the world through the use of GGO Technologies.

== Seasons ==
=== Season 1 ===
No. in total	No. in season	Chinese title	English title
1	1	神秘的球员-潜龙	The Mysterious Player-Myth
2	2	承担	Responsibility
3	3	战区擂台赛	Battle in the Arena
4	4	再战简•奥尼	Re-Match with Shawn
5	5	左上角的秘密	The Secret of the Upper Left Corner
6	6	谁是总领队？	Who is the Team Captain?
7	7	镜战术	Illusion Attack
8	8	赤足败阵？！	Barefoot's Defeat?!
9	9	迷失在蜂群之中	Lost in a Swarm of Bees
10	10	神秘的潜能	Hidden Potential
11	11	神盾五子	The Armoured Five
12	12	诱敌之计	The Decoy
13	13	十二码的直觉	The Penalty Instinct
14	14	狂妄的魔术师	The Mad Magician
15	15	击破掩眼法	Shattering Illusions
16	16	突如其来的战友	The Unexpected Teammate
17	17	卧龙•初遇	Nicholas the Demon - First Encounter
18	18	球场上的阅读者	The Reader on the Field
19	19	火焰射球VS火焰射球！	Roaring Flame Strike VS Roaring Flame Strike!
20	20	恶魔现身了	Revealing the Angry Demon
21	21	最后一场战役	The Last Battle
22	22	奥尼的射球机器	Shawn's Scoring Machine
23	23	苦战！诺曼底战阵！	Intensity of the Normandy Formation!
24	24	11人的足球比赛	Barefoot 11
25	25	最漫长的战役	The Longest Battle
26	26	永远的好拍档	Forever Partners
27	27	进攻决赛的舞台	Driving to the Finals
28	28	人魔之战	Humans VS Demons
29	29	高迅打倒高迅	Isaac VS Isaac
30	30	赤足！永不放弃！	Never Give Up Barefoot!
31	31	快乐足球VS地狱足球	Heaven Football VS Hell Football
32	32	最后的火焰射球	The Ultimate Roaring Flame Strike
33	33	寻找高文	Searching for Coleman
34	34	GGO的奥秘	The Mystery of GGO
35	35	世界之霸者	Ruler of the World
36	36	疾电幻灭	Swift's Exit
37	37	高文的指令	Coleman's Game Plan
38	38	攻不破的数据镜影	The Indestructible Pre-attack Simulation
39	39	被围困的流星与铁甲	Trapping Titan and Satellite
40	40	来自阿根廷的玫瑰刺针	The Argentina Stings
41	41	玫瑰•优雅地刺进赤足龙门	Scoring with Style
42	42	再见新疾电•再见了奥尼	Swift Reborn! Goodbye Shawn!
43	43	赤足第六人	The Sixth Man
44	44	天鸟滑翔	Falcon Gliding Pass
45	45	失去自我的守门员	Lack of Confidence
46	46	互信之战	The Battle of Trust
47	47	亚洲赛的阴谋	The Asia Qualifying Tournament Conspiracy
48	48	神秘小国的面具	The Mask of The Sanya Kingdom
49	49	幽灵修罗门	The Ghost of Sura
50	50	重聚的战友	Reunited
51	51	可怕的火焰射球	The Sura Roaring Flame Strike
52	52	赤红烈焰	Red Flames

=== Season 2 ===
No. in total	No. in season	Chinese title	English title
53	1	奥尼外传 重遇战友	Chronicles of Shawn
54	2	奥尼外传 不敌心魔	Demons of the Heart
55	3	奥尼外传 缺憾残影过后	Shadow's Regret: The Aftermath
56	4	奥尼外传 永远柏亚斯	Forever Perseus
57	5	进军世界大赛	To the International Tournament
58	6	震惊 读心术	Shocking Mind Reading
59	7	赤足 被看穿的一切	Barefoot Bares All
60	8	赤足 心跳声	Barefoot: Rhythm of the Heart
61	9	对弈 会说话的传球	Face Off: If Passes Could Talk
62	10	反击 六十秒	60-second Counter Attack!
63	11	神话 旋风秘阵	The Legend of Whirlwind Formation
64	12	雨战 无敌霸王	Rain Battle: The Invincible King
65	13	无坚不摧 史上最强旋风！	The Unstoppable Whirlwind
66	14	暴风 风眼中的激斗	Battle in the Eye of Storm
67	15	父子兵团 最强的战意	Father and Son: The Strongest Fighting Spirit
68	16	迷失 后备席	Lost in the Reserve Stand
69	17	奔牛 踏平一切	Raging Toro Stampede
70	18	乐章摇滚VS华尔兹	The Movement: Rock VS Waltz
71	19	三箭头刺穿斗牛阵	Piercing the Bullfighting Formation with the Trident
72	20	攻防 新绝技	Offense and Defense: New Signature Move
73	21	绝美 两分钟的演唱会	The Perfect Two-minute Concert
74	22	惊见 蛇蝎	Poisonous Surprise
75	23	秘密训练 完全破解	Secret Training: Cracking the Problem
76	24	后卫 射门与进攻	Defender: Strike and Offense
77	25	剧毒 毒蝎尾巴	Venom: Scorpion Tail
78	26	铁甲 终极长射	Titan's Ultimate Long-distance Strike
79	27	战阵 银河核心	Universe Core Formation
80	28	奥尼心魔	Demons of the Heart, Shawn
81	29	完美 中场	Perfect Midfielder
82	30	奥尼 决战宣言	Shawn's Declaration of War
83	31	对手 命中注定	Destined Rivals
84	32	三狮 天使身影	Team Lions, Angel's Silhouette
85	33	水墙 无法阻挡	Unstoppable Sea Wall
86	34	淹没 战士	Submerged Warriors
87	35	重生 烈巴男爵	The Rebirth of Tyrant
88	36	王牌 双雄对决	Battle of the Aces
89	37	烈焰冲天 骄阳再现	Raging Flames: The Sun Rises Again
90	38	顶点 最期待的战役	Epitome: The Long Awaited Battle
91	39	承诺 夺冠	Promise of the Champion
92	40	觉醒 重返战场	Awakening: The Return to Battle
93	41	最强森巴热浪	The Strongest Samba Heat Wave
94	42	终极赤足VS赤足	The Ultimate Battle: Team Barefoot VS Team Barefoot
95	43	共鸣 人机合一	Resonance: Human Robot Merge
96	44	最后谜团 世界冠军	Ultimate Mystery, World Champion
97	45	危机 活化初现	The Bio Team Crisis
98	46	邪恶 终极实验	The Ultimate Evil Experiment
99	47	偷取最强能力	Theft of the Strongest Powers
100	48	活化 潜龙	Bio Myth
101	49	双雄 隐形烈焰	Heroic Duel: Invisible Flames
102	50	血统 读心术	Bloodlines and Mind Reading
103	51	执着 追求胜利	Persistence for Victory
104	52	终极对决 赤红烈焰	The Final Showdown: Crimson Flames

== Overseas broadcast ==
The original firework lit up the sky of Hangzhou in the evening of April 28. The 6th China International Cartoon and Animation Festival, which is the most eye-catching and popular cartoon festival in China, opened in Hangzhou Huanglong Stadium.

AI Football GGO premiered in the Philippines premiered on July 20, 2010, on Hero TV and in India in Malayalam in April 2020. An English dub debuted in South Africa on July 10, 2010, on e.tv. In Singapore, Okto began airing the show in May 2012. The series ran between October 6, 2013, and April 5, 2014, on Eleven in Australia. In the United States, the show debuted on Primo TV alongside the channel's launch in January 2017. The second season debuted in April 2020. The first season began streaming on Tubi TV in Canada and the United States on September 12, 2020. Later, it premiered in Portugal on June 10, 2024 on SIC K.
