= V-me =

Spanish-language TV network in the United States

Vme TV
- Country: United States
- Headquarters: Doral, Florida

Programming
- Language: Spanish
- Picture format: 1080i (HDTV)

Ownership
- Owner: V-me Media Inc.
- Sister channels: Vme Kids; Primo TV

History
- Launched: March 5, 2007
- Closed: March 31, 2017 (carriage on PBS member stations)

Links
- Website: www.vmetv.com

V-me (Spanish pronunciation: [ˈbeme], a pun on veme, 'watch me' or 'see me') is a Hispanic-Latino American Spanish-language television network, formerly carried as an over-the-air public broadcasting network in association with public television stations. V-me airs a variety of programs, including drama, music, current affairs, food, lifestyle, nature and educational preschool content.

== History ==
The 24-hour digital broadcast service was launched on March 5, 2007, with a stated mission to entertain, educate and inspire families in Spanish with a contemporary mix of original productions, exclusive premieres, acquisitions, and popular public television programs from PBS and American Public Television, specially adapted for American Latinos.

The first venture of the media production and distribution company V-me Television Media Inc., it is a public-private partnership between WNET, a non-commercial educational public television station licensed to Newark, New Jersey, and the investment firm Baeza Group, the venture capital firm Syncom Funds, and Grupo PRISA from Spain, one of the world's largest Spanish and Portuguese-language media companies. WNET is a minority partner in the for-profit venture.

In April 2013, a Florida-based private investor group of Venezuelans (Eduardo Hauser, J. J. Rendón and Eligio Cedeño) took control of V-me Media, Inc., the U.S. Hispanic content and distribution company that owns Spanish-language network V-me and V-me Kids. Financial terms of the deal and the percentage of the ownership of the new investors was not disclosed. The V-me Board includes former AOL executive and founder and CEO of DailyMe.com Eduardo Hauser (chairman of the board), Syncom managing partner Terry Jones and WNET’s VP and general counsel Robert Feinberg. V-me founder, Mario Baeza, stepped down as chairman, but will continue to have an ownership interest. LPM is the largest stakeholder in V-me.

Among the journalists who have worked for V-me are Jorge Gestoso, Juan Manuel Benitez, Luis Sarmiento, Alonso Castillo, Jackeline Cacho and Marián de la Fuente.

In December 2016, the network announced it would move V-me off PBS member stations in 2017, following the expiration of the network's 10-year contracts with many of these stations, and transition exclusively to being broadcast on ten over-the-air affiliates and as a cable and satellite channel. Most of V-me's over-the-air affiliates were dropped by March 31, 2017; many of these affiliates had already chosen to replace V-me with a 24-hour PBS Kids channel, which launched on January 16.

The network has since pursued expanded cable carriage, along with distribution on AT&T U-verse, Dish Network, DirecTV and their associated streaming services, and the network was added nationwide at the start of October 2022 on Spectrum systems.

== Programming ==
The network broadcasts a variety of programming in Spanish:

- Latino-focused lifestyle content: health, parenting, travel, food, home, design, self-improvement and sports programs
- Prime time drama series
- News and current affairs, with Oppenheimer Presenta and Jorge Gestoso Investiga
- Nature documentaries from BBC, National Geographic and PBS
- Latin films and TV miniseries
- Original music series, like Estudio Billboard
- Weekly arts and pop culture specials
- Educational preschool programs in Spanish (40 hours a week)

== Affiliates ==
See: List of V-me affiliates
