= World Trigger =

Japanese manga series

- First tankōbon volume cover, featuring Yūma Kuga

ワールドトリガー (Wārudo Torigā)
- Genre: Adventure, science fiction
- Manga
- Written by: Daisuke Ashihara
- Published by: Shueisha
- English publisher: NA: Viz Media
- Imprint: Jump Comics
- Magazine: Weekly Shōnen Jump; (February 9, 2013 – November 26, 2018); Jump Square; (December 4, 2018 – present)
- English magazine: NA: Weekly Shonen Jump
- Original run: February 9, 2013 – present
- Volumes: 30
- Anime television series
- Directed by: Mitsuru Hongo (S1, #1−48); Kouji Ogawa (S1, #49−73); Morio Hatano (S2–3)
- Produced by: Daichi Nagatomi; Kei Mizutani (S1, #1−38, S2–3); Hiroshi Yanai (S1, #39−73)
- Written by: Hiroyuki Yoshino (S1, #1−48, S2–3); Sakimoto Sakai (S1, #49−73)
- Music by: Kenji Kawai
- Studio: Toei Animation
- Licensed by: Crunchyroll (streaming); NA: Sentai Filmworks (home video)
- Original network: ANN (TV Asahi)
- English network: US: Primo TV
- Original run: October 5, 2014 – January 23, 2022
- Episodes: 99
- Anime
- Directed by: Morio Hatano
- Written by: Hiroyuki Yoshino
- Studio: Toei Animation
- icon

World Trigger (Japanese: ワールドトリガー, Hepburn: Wārudo Torigā), also known in Japan by its abbreviation WorTri (Japanese: ワートリ, Hepburn: WāTori), is a Japanese manga series written and illustrated by Daisuke Ashihara. It was initially serialized in Shueisha's shōnen manga magazine Weekly Shōnen Jump from February 2013 to November 2018, and transferred to Jump Square in December 2018. Its chapters have been collected in 30 tankōbon volumes as of October 2026. In North America, the manga has been licensed for English release by Viz Media.

An anime television series adaptation produced by Toei Animation aired on TV Asahi from October 2014 to April 2016. A second season aired from January to April 2021, shortly followed by a third season that aired from October 2021 to January 2022. An anime remake that re-adapts the manga storyline featured in the original anime's first season was announced in December 2025.

== Synopsis ==
=== Setting ===
One day, a gate to another world opens in Mikado City (三門市, Mikado-shi) and monsters called "Neighbors" (近界民(ネイバー), Neibā; lit. 'Near-world people') start appearing from it. Humanity struggles to fight the Neighbors, as their weapons are ineffective against them, until a mysterious organization appears that is able to repel the Neighbors' attacks. The organization is called the National Defense Agency, or "Border", and has appropriated the Neighbor technology "Triggers", which allows its user to channel an internal energy called Trion and use it as a weapon or for other purposes. When a Trigger is activated, the user's body is replaced with a battle-body made of Trion.

=== Plot ===
Four years following the appearance of the gate, the people of Mikado City have become accustomed to fighting with the Neighbors and have mostly returned to everyday life. One day, a mysterious white-haired student named Yūma Kuga (空閑 遊真, Kuga Yūma) transfers to the local school. Kuga is actually a strong humanoid Neighbor, which he seeks to hide from Border. At school, he meets another student, Osamu Mikumo (三雲 修, Mikumo Osamu), who is secretly a C-rank Border trainee. Since Kuga is unfamiliar with life in Mikado City, Mikumo must help him adjust to life there and keep him a secret from Border.

== Media ==
=== Manga ===
Written and illustrated by Daisuke Ashihara, World Trigger started in Shueisha's shōnen manga magazine Weekly Shōnen Jump on February 9, 2013. Due to health issues on the part of the author, it was put on hiatus in November 2016. The series resumed publication on October 29, 2018, and ran until November 26 of the same year, before being transferred to the monthly manga magazine Jump Square on December 4, 2018. Shueisha has collected its chapters into individual tankōbon volumes. The first volume was released on July 4, 2013. As of October 2, 2026, 30 volumes have been released.

In North America, Viz Media licensed the series for English release in 2014. The first volume was released on October 7, 2014. As of March 3, 2026, 28 volumes have been released.

=== Anime ===
In May 2014, an anime adaptation of World Trigger was announced to start airing in October of the same year. The series is produced by Toei Animation and its first 73 episodes were broadcast on TV Asahi from October 5, 2014, to April 3, 2016. The series is directed by Mitsuru Hongo with series composition by Hiroyuki Yoshino. Toshihisa Kaiya and Hitomi Tsuruta are the character designers and animation directors, and the music is composed by Kenji Kawai. The season was originally slated to run for 50 episodes, but ended up receiving 73 episodes. In July 2015, the World Trigger Summer Festival 2015 event announced World Trigger: Isekai Kara no Tōbōsha, a new series with an original story not featured in the original manga, debuting new characters and concepts. The "new series" ended up being the "Fugitive Arc", which ran from episodes 49 to 63. The Nagoya trio Sonar Pocket performed the anime's first opening theme song, "Girigiri" (ギリギリ; lit. 'Borderline'). The second opening theme song is "Ashita no Hikari" (アシタノヒカリ; lit. 'The Light of Tomorrow'), performed by AAA. The third opening theme song is Dream Trigger (ドリームトリガー), performed by Pile.

In December 2019, During Jump Festa '20, it was announced that the series would receive a second season, with the cast reprising their roles and Toei Animation returning to produce the series. Morio Hatano was the new series director, while the rest of the staff reprised their roles. The second season aired for 12 episodes on TV Asahi's NUMAnimation block from January 10 to April 4, 2021. The opening theme song is "Force", performed by TXT, while the ending theme song is "Mirai Eigō" (未来永劫; lit. 'The Endless Future'), performed by Kami wa Saikoro o Furanai.

In December 2020, During Jump Festa '21, it was announced that the series would receive a third season. The third season aired for 14 episodes on TV Asahi's NUMAnimation from October 10, 2021, to January 23, 2022. The opening theme song is "Time Factor" (タイムファクター), performed by Kami wa Saikoro o Furanai, while the ending theme song is "Ungai Shōkei" (雲外憧憬; lit. 'Yearning to Be Above the Clouds'), performed by Fantastic Youth.

In North America, Toei announced in July 2015 that they would be producing an English dub with Ocean Productions. The series began airing in the United States on Primo TV on January 16, 2017. The English dub became available on Crunchyroll on February 11, 2020. In September 2020, Crunchyroll announced a "home video and electronic sell-through distribution" partnership with Sentai Filmworks to distribute anime titles on home video. The series was released on Blu-ray on June 8, 2021. On October 8, 2021, it was announced the English dub of season 2 would be released in 2022. The dub for the second and third season were released on a variety of download to own platforms beginning on October 4, 2022.

In December 2025, it was announced that the anime would receive a "Reboot Project". A week after this announcement, the official X account for the anime clarified that the project is a remake of the first season of the original anime that intends to re-adapt the manga's storyline from the beginning, including the "Border Enlistment Arc", "Large-Scale Invasion Arc", and "B-Rank Wars Arc". Toei Animation will return from the original anime to produce the first season remake, and the cast and staff are reprising their roles.

=== Video games ===
A PlayStation Vita action game developed by Artdink titled World Trigger: Borderless Mission (ワールドトリガー ボーダレスミッション) was released in Japan on September 17, 2015. An iOS and Android game developed by Ganbarion titled World Trigger: Smash Borders (ワールドトリガー スマッシュボーダーズ) was released on July 21, 2015. It was later released on PlayStation Vita on February 17, 2016. Both were published by Bandai Namco Games.

== Reception ==
=== Manga ===
World Trigger was the 20th best-selling manga of 2016, with over 1.2 million copies sold. By July 2023, the manga had over 15 million copies in circulation.

The series ranked 43rd on the 2014 "Book of the Year" list from Media Factory's Da Vinci magazine, where professional book reviewers, bookstore employees, and Da Vinci readers participate; it ranked 33rd on the 2015 list; 31st on the 2019 list; 44th on the 2021 list; ninth on the 2022 list; and 26th on the 2023 list.

In a 2016 reader's poll on Goo, the series was voted as the fifth most likely to become a Weekly Shōnen Jump signature series. On TV Asahi's Manga Sōsenkyo 2021 poll, in which 150,000 people voted for their top 100 manga series, World Trigger ranked fourteenth.

Rebecca Silverman of Anime News Network said that "World Trigger is an exciting read that distributes its information organically rather than relying on info-dumps."

=== Anime ===
The anime series ranked tenth in the Tokyo Anime Award Festival's top 100 TV anime series of 2016. During NHK'S top 100 anime voting, World Trigger placed 158 out of 400, tied with Detective Conan: The Darkest Nightmare.

The first season of the anime received criticism stemming from Toei's handling of the adaptation. Gabriella Ekens from Anime News Network referred to the production as "incompetent" and "baffling", stating "World Trigger isn't a bad show, but it's a terrible adaptation."
