= Primo TV =

American children's television channel

- Country: United States
- Broadcast area: United States
- Headquarters: Miami, Florida

Programming
- Language: English

Ownership
- Owner: V-me Media Inc.
- Sister channels: V-me; Vme Kids

History
- Launched: January 16, 2017; 9 years ago

Links
- Website: primotv.com

Primo TV is an American English-language children's television channel operated by V-me Media aimed at the 6-16-year-old Latino market in the United States. The channel launched exclusively through Comcast Xfinity cable systems on January 16, 2017.

== Programming ==
- Animal Fanpedia
- Angelo Rules (Season 4)
- Bakugan 3.1
- Born to Spy
- Brain Buzz
- Chaotic (Seasons 1-3)
- Citizen Code
- Danger! Wild Animals
- Di-Gata Defenders (Season 1 & 2)
- Droners (Season 1 & 2)
- Earth Science Investigators
- Four and a Half Friends
- Itch
- Jade Armor
- Joy Eternal
- Kaeloo
- Legend of the Dragon
- Legend Quest: Masters of Myth
- Leon
- Life with Boys
- Living with Dad
- Looped
- MathXplosion
- MaXi
- Me and My Robot
- Mind Blowing Breakthroughs
- Miss Moon
- Mr. Young
- Mystery Lane
- Pipo, Pepa, and Pop
- The Prime Radicals (Season 1)
- ScienceXplosion
- Silverpoint
- Super Animals
- That's Cool!
- The Actually Really Very Difficult Show
- Time Jam: Valerian & Laureline
- Totally Spies
- Wow That's Amazing!
- You're Called What?
- Zak Storm

== Former programming ==
- A Kind of Magic
- The Adventures of the Young Marco Polo
- Angelo Rules
- Alisa Knows What to Do!
- Animals at Work
- Arena eSports
- Art Odyssey
- Backyard Science
- Bakugan Battle Brawlers
- Bat Pat
- B-Daman Crossfire
- Beyblade Metal Fusion
- Bindi's Bootcamp
- Blue Water High
- Blue Zoo
- Brave Wilderness
- Bushwhacked!
- Captain Tsubasa
- Code Lyoko (Season 1 & 2)
- Contraptus (fr)
- Cooler Facts
- Connor Undercover
- Creature Mania
- Deadly 360
- Deadly 60
- Deadly Art
- Deadly Mission Madagascar
- Deadly Nightmares of Nature
- Deadly Top 10s
- Dennis & Gnasher: Unleashed!
- Denver, the Last Dinosaur
- Dinosaur King
- Did You Know?
- Dinofroz
- Dogs with Jobs
- The Drakers
- Dude, That's My Ghost
- The Elephant Princess
- Five @ 305
- Freefonix
- Get Wild at the San Diego Zoo
- Generation STEM
- GGO Football
- Grossology
- How 2
- Instant Star
- Invention Story
- Invizimals
- Kid Detectives
- Kids Flix
- Kong: King of the Apes
- The Last Kids on Earth
- The Latest Buzz
- The Legendaries
- Leo's Pollinators
- Leonardo
- Let's Get Inventin'
- The Little Prince
- LMN's Adventures in the Microworld
- Lola & Virginia
- Lucky Fred
- Marcus Level
- Matt Hatter Chronicles
- Mechamato (Season 1 & 2)
- Mega Bites
- Metalions (Season 1)
- Mondo Yan
- Most Xtreme Alien Planet Earth
- Mudpit
- The Outsiders Club
- Pac-Man and the Ghostly Adventures
- PinCode
- Pumpkin Reports
- Real Life 101
- Really Me
- Ride or Wrong
- Rolling with the Ronks!
- Sadie Sparks
- Science Max: Experiments at Large!
- The Secret Life of Suckers
- Sindbad & The 7 Galaxies
- Sissi: The Young Empress
- Skylanders Academy
- Street Football
- Speed Racer: The Next Generation
- Super 4
- Super Human Challenge
- Think Big
- Tom Sawyer
- Wacky World Beaters
- The Rubbish World of Dave Spud
- The Way Things Work
- We're Talking Animals
- What Do You Know?
- When I Grow Up
- When I Was Your Age
- Wicked Science
- The Wild Soccer Bunch
- Wolfblood
- World Animal Championship
- World Trigger
- You're Under Arrest
- Zak Jinks
