= Yukie Maeda =

Japanese voice actor (1973–2026)

Yukie Maeda (Japanese: 前田ゆきえ; October 14, 1973 – March 9, 2026) was a Japanese voice actress.

== Life and career ==
Maeda was born in Nara prefecture on October 14, 1973. She lived in the Ivory Coast from six months to five years old. The family then relocated to Aichi Prefecture from the age of 5 to the second grade of elementary school, for a year in the third grade of elementary school, in Hyogo Prefecture, and Nara Prefecture from the 4th grade to 1997.

Throughout her career, she was a voice actress in a number of anime, including Love Hina, Shin Koihime Musō, Transformers: Armada.

On October 4, 2025, Maeda announced on her X account that she was diagnosed with malignant sarcoma and moved to Kansai region. She later retired on February 26, 2026 due to her worsening health. Maeda died March 9, 2026, at the age of 52.
