= Ashley Boettcher =

American actress

- Occupation: Actress
- Years active: 2005–present

Ashley Boettcher is an American actress. Boettcher has acted since the age of four and is best known for her role as Melody Fuller in the Amazon Studios Original Series Gortimer Gibbon's Life on Normal Street.

== Life and career ==
Boettcher has appeared in multiple television series and films, and is known for her roles in Aliens in the Attic as Hannah Pearson, and as Mel Fuller in Gortimer Gibbon's Life on Normal Street.

== Filmography ==
=== Film ===
Year	Title	Role	Notes
2009	Aliens in the Attic	Hannah Pearson	
2011	Judy Moody and the Not Bummer Summer	Jessica Finch	
2015	Yellow Day	Little Girl	
2016	Throne of Elves	Liya (voice)	English dub
2019	Weathering with You	Hina Amano (voice)	English dub
2022	Ernest & Celestine: A Trip to Gibberitia	Celestine (voice)	English dub
2022	Lonely Castle in the Mirror	Moe Tojo (voice)	English dub
2025	David	Teen Zeruiah (voice)	

=== Television ===
Year	Title	Role	Notes
2005	Prison Break	Garlic Cutter's granddaughter	Episode: "Allen"
2006	Las Vegas	Little Sister	Episode: "White Christmas"
2011	Shake It Up	Suzie Richman	Episode: "Camp it Up"
2011	Partners	Young Matty Scott	Television movie
2013	Aliens in the House	Phoebe	Television movie
2014	About a Boy	Ashley	Episode: "About a Kiss"
2014	The Legend of Korra	Kuon's daughter (voice)	Episode: "Rebirth"
2014–2016	Gortimer Gibbon's Life on Normal Street	Mel Fuller	Main role
2016	Summer Camp Island	Hedgehog (voice)	Pilot
2017	Code Black	Olivia Jones	Episode: "Vertigo"
2017–2018	Lost in Oz	Dorothy Gale, additional voices	Main role
2018	Alone Together	Jane	Episode: "A Drama Story"
2018	Get Shorty	Zoe	2 episodes
2019	I Think You Should Leave with Tim Robinson	Claire	Episode: "Thanks for Thinking They Are Cool"
2019	Twelve Forever	Gwen (voice)	4 episodes
2020	Outmatched	Nicole	
2020	Just Add Magic: Mystery City	Leo's Cousin, Frankie	Episode: "Just Add Numbers"

=== Video games ===
Year	Title	Role	Notes
2019	Kingdom Hearts III	Olette (voice)	English dub
2021	Final Fantasy VII Remake Intergrade	Nayo (voice)	English dub

== Awards and nominations ==
Year	Award	Category	Work	Result
2012	Young Artist Award	Best Performance in a Feature Film – Young Ensemble Cast	Judy Moody and the Not Bummer Summer (shared with Jordana Beatty, Preston Bailey, Parris Mosteller, Garrett Ryan, Cameron Boyce, Taylar Hender, Jackson Odell)	Won
