= Jordana Beatty =

Australian actress (born 1998)

- Born: 30 January 1998 (age 28); Sydney, Australia
- Education: University of Sydney
- Occupation: Actress
- Years active: 2002–present
- Partner(s): Marc Princi (2015–present; engaged)

Jordana Beatty (born 30 January 1998) is an Australian actress best known for playing the title role of Judy Moody in the feature film Judy Moody and the Not Bummer Summer and Susan Parks in the 10th anniversary tour of Billy Elliot the Musical.

== History ==
Beatty was born on January 30, 1998 in Sydney, Australia and began acting in 2002, and appeared in Australian television commercials. She has played roles in the Home and Away and All Saints television series. She also played the character Rachel in the television series Legend of the Seeker.

In 2012, she was nominated for the Young Artist Award as Best Leading Young Actress for her role in the film Judy Moody and the Not Bummer Summer. She was also cast to play the title role in Eloise in Paris alongside Uma Thurman, but the film was never made.

In 2013, she was cast as Optimism in Mind Over Maddie, a local children's program on Disney Channel Australia, and in 2019, she was cast as ballerina Susan Parks in the 10th anniversary Australian tour of Billy Elliot the Musical.

== Personal life ==
Beatty has been in a relationship with Marc Princi since May 2015. They announced their engagement on May 17, 2025.

== Filmography ==
=== Television ===
Year	Title	Role	Notes
2002	Life Support		1 Episode: "Episode #2.6"
2005	All Saints	Lucy Stevens	6 Episodes
2007	Home and Away	Jessie Watson	2 Episodes
2009	Legend of the Seeker	Rachel	2 Episodes
2011	Film Fiend	Herself - Guest	1 Episode: "Cars 2"
2011	Made in Hollywood	Herself	1 Episode: "Episode #6.29"
2013	Mind Over Maddie	Optimism	Starring role
2021	Young Rock	Bonnie	4 Episodes

=== Film ===
Year	Title	Role	Notes
2006	Superman Returns	Little Girl	
2011	Judy Moody and the Not Bummer Summer	Judy Moody	

== Awards and nominations ==
Year	Award	Category	Work	Result	Refs
2012	Young Artist Award	Best Performance in a Feature Film - Young Ensemble Cast (shared with Preston Bailey, Parris Mosteller, Garrett Ryan, Ashley Boettcher, Taylar Hender, Cameron Boyce, Jackson Odell)	Judy Moody and the Not Bummer Summer	Won	
2012	Young Artist Award	Best Leading Young Actress in a Feature Film	Judy Moody and the Not Bummer Summer	Nominated	
