= Megan McDonald =

American children's literature author

- Born: February 28, 1959 (age 67); Pittsburgh, Pennsylvania, U.S.
- Education: Oberlin College; University of Pittsburgh
- Occupations: Author, librarian
- Spouse: Richard Haynes
- Writing career
- Period: 1991–present
- Genre: Children's literature
- Notable works: Judy Moody series Stink series
- Website: meganmcdonald.net

Megan Jo McDonald (born February 28, 1959) is an American children's literature author and former librarian best known for the Judy Moody series, which has sold more than 30 million copies. McDonald has also written the Julie Albright series for American Girl various picture books.

== Life and career ==
McDonald was born in Pittsburgh, Pennsylvania, to John and Mary Louise McDonald. She is the youngest of five girls, which served as the inspiration for The Sister's Club. She was awarded a B.A. from Oberlin College in 1981, and an M.L.S. from University of Pittsburgh in 1985.

Megan McDonald began her career as a children's librarian, working at Carnegie Library of Pittsburgh, Minneapolis Public Library, and Adams Memorial Library in Latrobe, Pennsylvania. Her first book, Is This a House for Hermit Crab?, came as a result of patrons asking her where to find a story she had told to children at a library. McDonald identified Tuck Everlasting and Bridge to Terebithia as books she wished she had written herself.

McDonald is married to Richard Haynes and has lived in Sebastopol, California since the mid 1990s. She receives letters from fans and said in 2005, "I try to write a personal response to every one. I am so impressed when children write to me."

== Published works ==
=== Judy Moody and Stink ===
The Judy Moody series follows the humorous adventures of eight-year-old Judy Moody. A spin-off series follows her younger brother, nicknamed Stink. All of the Judy Moody series and Stink series books are illustrated by Peter H. Reynolds.

Among the characters are Judy Moody, Stink Moody, Rocky Zang, Frank Pearl, Jessica Finch, Amy Namey, Alisson Monday, Mr. Todd, Jalisco, Tody, Chloe, and Tori.

Judy Moody books:

1. Judy Moody (originally published as "Judy Moody Was in a Mood. Not a Good Mood, a Bad Mood)(Candlewick Press, 2000)
2. Judy Moody Gets Famous! (Candlewick Press, 2001)
3. Judy Moody Saves the World! (Candlewick Press, 2002)
4. Judy Moody Predicts the Future (Candlewick Press, 2003)
5. Judy Moody, M.D. The Doctor Is In (Published in the UK as Doctor Judy Moody) (Candlewick Press, 2004)
6. Judy Moody Declares Independence (Candlewick Press, 2005)
7. Judy Moody: Around the World in 8½ Days (Candlewick Press, 2006)
8. Judy Moody Goes to College (Candlewick Press, 2008)
9. Judy Moody: Girl Detective (Candlewick Press, 2010)
10. Judy Moody and the Not Bummer Summer (Candlewick Press, 2011)
11. Judy Moody and the Bad Luck Charm (Candlewick Press, 2012)
12. Judy Moody: Mood Martian (Candlewick Press, 2014)
13. Judy Moody and the Bucket List (Candlewick Press, 2016)
14. Judy Moody and the Royal Tea Party (Candlewick Press, 2017)
15. Judy Moody Book Quiz Whiz (Candlewick Press, 2018)
16. Judy Moody: In a Monday Mood (Candlewick Press, 2021)

Judy Moody and Stink books:

1. Judy Moody & Stink: The Holly Joliday (Candlewick Press, 2008)
2. Judy Moody & Stink: The Mad, Mad, Mad, Mad Treasure Hunt (Candlewick Press, 2009)
3. Judy Moody & Stink: The Big Bad Blackout (Candlewick Press, 2014)
4. Judy Moody & Stink: The Wishbone Wish (Candlewick Press, 2015)

Stink books:

1. "Stink: The Incredible Shrinking Kid" (Candlewick Press, 2005)
2. "Stink: and the Incredible Super-Galactic Jawbreaker" (Candlewick Press, 2006)
3. "Stink: and the World's Worst Super-Stinky Sneakers" (Candlewick Press, 2007)
4. "Stink: and the Great Guinea Pig Express" (Candlewick Press, 2008)
5. "Stink: Solar System Superhero" (Candlewick Press, 2009)
6. "Stink: and the Ultimate Thumb-Wrestling Smackdown" (Candlewick Press, 2011)
7. "Stink: and the Midnight Zombie Walk" (Candlewick Press, 2012)
8. "Stink: and the Freaky Frog Freakout" (Candlewick Press, 2013)
9. "Stink: and the Shark Sleepover" (Candlewick Press, 2014)
10. "Stink: and the Attack of the Slime Mold" (Candlewick Press, 2016)
11. "Stink: Hamlet and Cheese" (Candlewick Press, 2018)
12. "Stink: and the Hairy Scary Spider" (Candlewick Press, 2020)
13. "Stink: Superhero Superfan" (Candlewick Press, 2023)
14. "Stink: and the Big Bad Badgers" (Candlewick Press, 2025)

Film:

- Judy Moody and the Not Bummer Summer (2011)

=== Novels ===
- The Bridge to Nowhere (Orchard, 1993)
- Shadows in the Glasshouse (Pleasant Company, 2000)
- The Sisters Club (American Girl, 2003)
- All the Stars in the Sky: The Santa Fe Trail Diary of Florrie Mack Ryder (Dear America series, Scholastic, 2003)

=== The Sisters Club Series ===
- The Sisters Club (2008)
- The Rule of Three (2010)
- Cloudy with a Chance of Boys (2011)

=== American Girl titles ===
McDonald was hired to write a series about Julie Albright, the historical character from the 1970s introduced by American Girl in 2007. Julie has divorced parents and lives in California. She organizes a petition for girls to be allowed to play on the school's basketball team, celebrates Earth Day and the United States Bicentennial, and asks her mother what Watergate is.

- Meet Julie
- Julie Tells Her Story
- Happy New Year, Julie!
- Julie and the Eagles
- Julie's Journey
- Changes for Julie
- A Brighter Tomorrow: My Journey with Julie
- Pen Pals (American Girl Magazine)
- The Gnome Diaries

== Films ==
Megan McDonald's book, Judy Moody and the Not Bummer Summer, was adapted to a movie with the same name released in 2011, directed by John Schultz, with Jordana Beatty in the role of Judy Moody. McDonald co-wrote the screenplay with Kathy Waugh.

== Awards ==
- 1991: Children's Choice Book, International Reading Association/Children's Book Council (CBC), for Is This a House for Hermit Crab?
- 1991: Reading Rainbow book selection, Is This a House for Hermit Crab?
- 1993: Judy Blume Contemporary Fiction Award, Society of Children's Book Writers and Illustrators, for The Bridge to Nowhere
- 1993: Carolyn W. Field Award, Pennsylvania Library Association, for The Great Pumpkin Switch
- 2003: Garden State Children's Book Award for Younger Fiction, for Judy Moody
- 2014: California Book Awards Juvenile Finalist, for Shoe Dog
