= The Bridge to Nowhere (novel) =

Novel authored by Megan McDonald

- Author: Megan McDonald
- Language: English
- Publisher: Orchard Books
- Publication date: 1993
- Publication place: United States
- Media type: Print (hardback)
- Pages: 154 pp
- ISBN: 978-0-531-05478-9
- OCLC: 27143788
- LC Class: PZ7.M478419 Br 1993

The Bridge to Nowhere is a young adult novel by the American writer Megan McDonald.

Based on an actual incident in 1964, its protagonist is Hallie, a Pittsburgh seventh-grader coping with the mental depression of her laid off father, an iron worker, and the separation she undergoes. An incomplete bridge across the Allegheny River serves as constant reminder that his vocation is gone and this fact prompts a spectacular dramatic act.

== Plot summary ==
After losing his job as a bridge-builder, Hallie's father begins suffering from depression and fits of anger, which lead Hallie into bouts of isolation. At the onset of the novel, she accompanies her mother to follow her father in order to see where he is going, as he doesn't have a job. They see him standing on top of the "Bridge to Nowhere," a bridge project that he was never able to finish. They return, and a tense evening follows. Hallie tries to communicate with her mother and father, but they are too much blinded by their own fears, doubts, and regrets, that she simply retreats to her room instead. She talks with her friend Jude from school, who is more receptive to Hallie's family issues, but isn't what Hallie needs. Hallie then develops a friendship with Crane Henderson, a high school freshman. She is intimidated at first by his age and popularity, but, after Crane and her go for a walk through the woods, he becomes more comforting and easy to talk to around her. As their relationship grows, Hallie's family life becomes more dreary. Her sister Shelley returns from college, but her jaded attitude towards her family does little to easy Hallie's troubles. In addition, Shelley doesn't want to spend time with Hallie, furthering her younger sister's alienation at home. Crane continues to act as an outlet for Hallie, as someone to talk to. They both go to the bridge one day, where Hallie spots her father standing dangerously high up. As Crane attempts to get his attention, Hallie runs from the scene, afraid he'll find out the man on the bridge is her father. Having alienated Crane, Hallie has no one left to talk to, and finally yells at her father for never talking to her anymore. The next day, she finds that he has driven his car over the edge of the bridge, and was taken to the hospital. She rushes to see him, against her mother's will, and finds that he has amnesia as a result of the accident. Her father returns home after a short stay in the hospital, and is seemingly cured of his bitterness, to the family's relief.

== Characters ==
· Hallie: Daughter of Jim, and protagonist of the story. She has lack of communication with her mother and father, and struggles with growing up in an atmosphere where she cannot discuss her distress.

· Crane Henderson: Crane is a high school freshman, interested in Hallie. He talks to her frequently, and serves as one of the only characters who can communicate with her. He develops a relationship with Hallie over the course of the novel.

· Louise: Hallie's mother. Similar to her father, she is somewhat distant as well. She attempts to keep the household together despite the lack of income and the issues presented by Jim's out-of-work status.

· Jude: Hallie's best friend from school.

· Shelley: Hallie's sister, an older college student. She is also a distant figure in Hallie's life. Shelley is bitter towards her father, and chooses not to spend time with her younger sister.

· Jim: Hallie's father, who lost his job building the bridge and has depression as a result. He is distant and uncommunicative, and spends his time submerging himself within television, radio, and other diversions. He is prone to bursts of anger, and is a volatile source of anxiety within the family.

== Themes ==
· Communication: Communication is central to the text. The majority of the characters are stilted, or lacking, in their conversation, which denies Hallie an outlet for her issues.

· Detachment: The characters exhibit distance in their communications with Hallie. They are possessed by issues that cloud the importance of the other people in their lives.

· Relationships: Relationships are important to Hallie, but they aren't fulfilling. The novel illustrates a young child's need for relationships in his or her life.

· Nature: The processes of nature serve as a backdrop to the unnatural constriction of Hallie's home life. Animals are displayed in their natural settings, seen communicating with each other, and using their instincts to live their lives.

== Symbolism ==
· Bridges: The unfinished bridge is a source of frustration for Hallie's father. It causes him to become distant and uncommunicative. The symbol of the unfinished bridge not only causes the domestic stress and disconnect, but it represents the disconnect between Hallie and the people in her life.

· Animals: The communications and nests of birds are antithetical to Hallie's home life, which is void of meaningful communication, as well as a nourishing domestic space, which the nest is representative of. Also, the mice Hallie purchases from the pet store represent family, as they give birth. One of the characters states that mice sometimes eat their young, again, representing the antagonism that Hallie faces from her father.

· Telephones: Telephone use is somewhat heavy throughout the text, furthering the theme of communication. Characters talk on the phone superficially, which demonstrates the further decay of communication that takes place within the text.

== Reception ==
The novel has received mixed reviews, mostly negative, the main complaints residing in the area of poor narrative structure. A small article in "Publishers Weekly" notes that that novel's "grasp on time, narrative structure and characterization remains rather shaky ... McDonald does practically nothing to anchor the story in [its time] period." Critics see the ending as particularly weak, noting that McDonald's employment of amnesia to tie up the story is too convenient. Kirkus Reviews describes "the book's greatest strength" are "the fully-realized characters ... The writing, too, is unusually well-crafted: accessible, lyrical, with wonderfully natural dialogue."
