= Gortimer Gibbon's Life on Normal Street =

American television series

- Genre: Kids & Family; Supernatural; Drama; Soft science fiction; Mystery
- Created by: David Anaxagoras
- Starring: Sloane Morgan Siegel; Ashley Boettcher; Drew Justice
- Composer: Sasha Gordon
- Country of origin: United States
- Original language: English
- No. of seasons: 2
- No. of episodes: 39

Production
- Executive producers: Ann Lewis Hamilton; Luke Matheny
- Producer: Richard G. King
- Cinematography: Eduardo Enrique Mayén
- Editor: Cheryl Campsmith
- Running time: 26 minutes
- Production companies: Amazon Studios; Pictures in a Row

Original release
- Network: Amazon Prime Video
- Release: February 6, 2014 – July 15, 2016

Gortimer Gibbon's Life on Normal Street is an American live action, magic realism family television series created by David Anaxagoras that was initially streamed for two seasons (2014–16) on Amazon Prime Video. The series follows young Gortimer Gibbon and his two best friends, Mel and Ranger, as they navigate Normal Street, a seemingly ordinary suburb with hints of something magical just below the surface. As of June 2018, reruns of the series aired on the Universal Kids cable network in the United States.

On February 25, 2015, Amazon renewed Gortimer Gibbon's Life on Normal Street for a second season. Season 2 premiered on October 30, 2015, and concluded on July 15, 2016.

== Cast ==
- Sloane Morgan Siegel as Gortimer Gibbon
- Ashley Boettcher as Mel Fuller
- Drew Justice as Ranger Bowen
- David Bloom as Stanley Zielinski
- Chandler Kinney as Catherine Dillman
- Coco Grayson as Abigail Arroyo
- Ryder Cohen as Gardner Gibbon
- Robyn Lively as Claire Gibbon
- Kim Rhodes as Vicki Bowen
- Paula Marshall as Lora Fuller
- Benjamin Koldyke as Greg Gibbon
- Luke Matheny as Fred Fisher

== Episodes ==
| Season | Episodes | | Originally released | |
| Season | Episodes | | First released | Last released |
|---|---|---|---|---|
| 1 | 13 | | February 6, 2014 | April 2, 2015 |
| 2 | 26 | 13 | October 30, 2015 | |
| 2 | 26 | 13 | July 15, 2016 | |

=== Season 1 (2014-15) ===
| No. overall | No. in season | Title | Directed by | Written by | Original release date | Prod. code |
|---|---|---|---|---|---|---|
| 1 | 1 | "Gortimer vs. the Frog of Ultimate Doom" | Luke Matheny | David Anaxagoras | February 6, 2014 | 101 |
On the hottest day of summer, Gortimer and his two best friends, Mel and Ranger, discover a way to end the heat by solving a mystery involving an intimidating neighbor and an even more intimidating frog.
| 2 | 2 | "Gortimer vs. the Mobile of Misfortune" | Luke Matheny | Garrett Frawley & Brian Turner | November 21, 2014 | 102 |
While trying to help the unluckiest kid on Normal Street, Gortimer accidentally jinxes himself with bad luck. Now Gortimer, Mel and Ranger must find a way to set things straight before a wave of misfortune threatens Normal Street's annual Road Rocket Race.
| 3 | 3 | "Mel vs. the Mel-o-dramatic Robot" | Luke Matheny | Laurie Parres | November 21, 2014 | 103 |
When Mel worries that her rival is the frontrunner for this year's school science fair, she scrambles to build a project that will blow everyone away.
| 4 | 4 | "Gortimer and the Mystical Mind Eraser" | Joe Nussbaum | Luke Matheny | November 21, 2014 | 104 |
When Gortimer learns a piece of information he would rather forget, he seeks help from an incredibly chipper but incredibly memory-impaired resident of Normal Street.
| 5 | 5 | "Gortimer Gets Shushed" | Steven Tsuchida | Gretchen Enders | November 21, 2014 | 105 |
The gang races to restore Gortimer's voice, stolen by a mysterious figure driving a ghostly bookmobile that appears on Normal Street for only one day each year.
| 6 | 6 | "Ranger and the Legend of Pendragon's Gavel" | Alethea Jones | Gretchen Enders | November 21, 2014 | 106 |
Shortly after the students elect Mel the president of the student council, she is dethroned after the unlikely Ranger proves himself to be the stuff of legend and becomes The Once and Future Student Council President.
| 7 | 7 | "Gortimer and the Leaky Dreamcatcher" | Steven Tsuchida | Ann Lewis Hamilton | April 2, 2015 | 107 |
Gortimer keeps having the same strange dream about a frightening underwater encounter -- and his mounting fears are getting in the way of his junior lifeguard training.
| 8 | 8 | "The Mystery of the Blood Moon Eclipse" | Sasie Sealy | Garrett Frawley & Brian Turner | April 2, 2015 | 108 |
To celebrate a rare astronomical event, Mel invites all her friends to a spooky sleepover, complete with ghost stories galore. But when it seems like an actual spirit has crashed the party, they all must hurry to solve the mystery before they become ghost stories themselves.
| 9 | 9 | "Ranger and the Mysterious Metamorphosis" | Eduardo Enrique Mayén | David Anaxagoras | April 2, 2015 | 109 |
After Ranger accidentally causes havoc at his family's bakery, he flees the scene to avoid getting into trouble, but his growing sense of guilt has an unusual effect.
| 10 | 10 | "Mel vs. the Fickle Fortune Teller of Fate" | Luke Matheny | Gretchen Enders | April 2, 2015 | 110 |
When Mel starts consulting a children's fortune teller game for advice on the future, she finds herself attempting to outsmart fate.
| 11 | 11 | "Gortimer and the Surprise Signature" | J.J. Johnson | Garrett Frawley & Brian Turner | April 2, 2015 | 111 |
Gortimer's curiosity is piqued when he discovers a mysterious signature. Is it the autograph of a new student at Normal Middle school... or has it been here all along?
| 12 | 12 | "Gortimer and the Lost Treasure of Normal Street" | Suzi Yoonessi | Laurie Parres | April 2, 2015 | 112 |
On his 13th birthday, Ranger and Mel lead Gortimer follow a trail of clues through town to find the fabled lost treasure of Normal Street.
| 13 | 13 | "Gortimer vs. the Relentless Rainbow of Joy" | Luke Matheny | David Anaxagoras & Luke Matheny | April 2, 2015 | 113 |
With his Dad in town for a short visit, Gortimer goes out of his way to ensure his happiness doesn't fade by creating a rainbow over Normal Street. But once all of the residents start acting unusually happy, Mel and Ranger wonder if he's gone a step too far.

=== Season 2 (2015-16) ===
| No. overall | No. in season | Title | Directed by | Written by | Original release date | Prod. code |
|---|---|---|---|---|---|---|
Part 1
| 14 | 1 | "Gortimer and the Blazer of Glory" | Luke Matheny | Garrett Frawley & Brian Turner | October 30, 2015 | 201 |
Gortimer gets a blazer that makes everyone see him as an adult. It changes the way he sees himself too and threatens his friends' plans for an epic water balloon battle.
| 15 | 2 | "Ranger and the Supercharged Championship" | Sasie Sealy | Levi Abrino | October 30, 2015 | 202 |
Ranger gets swept up in the celebrity of being the good luck charm of the basketball team, whose lucky head-rubs cause unnatural levels of static electricity.
| 16 | 3 | "Gortimer vs. the Terrible Touch-Up" | J.J. Johnson | Aminta Goyel | October 30, 2015 | 203 |
Mel and Abigail use a new photo software for the yearbook which accidentally erases Gortimer's smile. As they struggle to restore Gortimer, their budding friendship is tested.
| 17 | 4 | "Ranger and the Very Real Imaginary Friend" | Ryan Shiraki | Brian Turner & Garrett Frawley | October 30, 2015 | 204 |
Ranger's childhood imaginary friend comes back to visit, much to the chagrin of Gortimer.
| 18 | 5 | "Gortimer and the Vengeful Violinist"" | Sasie Sealy | Levi Abrino & Gretchen Enders | October 30, 2015 | 205 |
Gortimer is haunted by the sound of a mysterious violin, which interferes with his studies and his sleep. Gortimer realizes he can't hide the truth about his slipping grades from his dad.
| 19 | 6 | "Mel vs. the Hidden Herstory of Normal Street" | Sasie Sealy | David Anaxagoras & Laurie Parres | October 30, 2015 | 206 |
Amid the backdrop of Normal Days -- a celebration of the founding of Normal Street -- Mel discovers a shocking secret about the town's founder Captain Normal.
| 20 | 7 | "Gortimer and the Friendship Bro-celet" | Alethea Jones | Eric D. Wasserman | October 30, 2015 | 207 |
Gortimer and his mom's new boyfriend Adam warm up their chilly relationship with a magical friendship "Bro-celet".
| 21 | 8 | "Mel and the Mel-Functioning Brain" | Luke Matheny | Gretchen Enders | October 30, 2015 | 208 |
While studying for an important test, Mel's brain fills to capacity.
| 22 | 9 | "Stanley and the Tattoo of Tall Tales" | Alethea Jones | Garrett Frawley & Brian Turner | October 30, 2015 | 209 |
Stanley gets a magical tattoo, and suddenly everyone takes him seriously -- too seriously.
| 23 | 10 | "Gortimer vs. Gortimer vs. Gortimer" | Sasie Sealy | Luke Matheny | October 30, 2015 | 210 |
Gortimer has to babysit on the same night that he has a "date" with Abigail. He finds a solution when he clones himself, but the solution quickly becomes a problem.
| 24 | 11 | "Ranger and the Fabled Flower of Normal Street" | Paul Hoen | Laurie Parres | October 30, 2015 | 211 |
Ranger brings Mel and a heartbroken Gortimer on a quest to find a fabled flower of Normal Street for his grandpa, who has an unexpected health scare.
| 25 | 12 | "Mel vs. the Future" | Luke Matheny | Story by : David Anaxagoras & Eric D. Wasserman Teleplay by : Eric D. Wasserman | October 30, 2015 | 212 |
In the wake of a shocking event, Mel tries to build a time machine to go back in time and fix it. But a visitor from the future arrives to dissuade Mel from her mission.
| 26 | 13 | "Gortimer, Ranger and Mel vs. the Endless Night" | Luke Matheny | Gretchen Enders & Aminta Goyel | October 30, 2015 | 213 |
The trio goes camping and shares a perfect moment that distracts them from all their recent troubles. Will a wish on a star make the moment continue?
Part 2
| 27 | 14 | "Gortimer and the Jacks of All Trades" | Alethea Jones | Garrett Frawley & Brian Turner | July 15, 2016 | 214 |
As a new year arrives on Normal Street, Gortimer resolves to find a new interest so he can keep up with his multi-talented friends. But when he stumbles upon a magical deck of cards that can make him an expert in any skill he desires, he begins to question his true self.
| 28 | 15 | "Ranger vs. the Laser Frog of Fate" | Alethea Jones | David Anaxagoras | July 15, 2016 | 215 |
At a pivotal moment for the Bowen family, Ranger learns his dad is plagued by an arch nemesis from his youth. Tired of seeing his dad live in Rob's shadow, Ranger takes matters into his own hands.
| 29 | 16 | "Gortimer, Mel, Ranger, Catherine and the Student Identity Crisis" | Jonathan Judge | May Chan | July 15, 2016 | 216 |
When the student ID card machine malfunctions, Gortimer, Mel, Ranger, and Catherine swap identities. As they walk a mile in each other's shoes, will they gain a new perspective on the friends they thought they knew so well?
| 30 | 17 | "Mel vs. the Night Mare of Normal Street" | Eduardo Enrique Mayén | Laurie Parres | July 15, 2016 | 217 |
When Mel starts seeing a mysterious horse everywhere she goes, Ranger warns it's the legendary, much feared Night Mare of Normal Street. In order to rid herself of the nightmares, Mel must overcome her greatest fear.
| 31 | 18 | "The Mystery of the Marlow Mansion" | Eduardo Enrique Mayén | Levi Abrino & Aminta Goyel | July 15, 2016 | 218 |
The gang takes part in a 1920s-themed mystery party and wind up stuck in their characters' personas. When a valuable antique goes missing, it's up to Gortimer to solve the mystery and bring his friends back to normal.
| 32 | 19 | "Ranger and the Weight of the World" | Ryan Shiraki | Garrett Frawley & Brian Turner | July 15, 2016 | 219 |
When family issues weigh on Ranger, his pals encourage him to talk it out at the peer counseling center. But once there, Ranger instead opts to be a peer counselor himself. And as more and more students confide in him, Ranger finds the weight of the world upon his shoulders.
| 33 | 20 | "Gortimer vs. the World's Best Mom" | Ryan Shiraki | Aminta Goyel | July 15, 2016 | 220 |
When work and family duties begin to overwhelm Claire, Gortimer reassures her with a special surprise gift: a "World's Best Mom" mug. But after just a few sips from it, Claire is transformed into a "super mom", but at what cost?
| 34 | 21 | "Mel vs. the Missing Day" | J.J. Johnson | Gretchen Enders | July 15, 2016 | 221 |
After Mel falls sick from stretching herself too thin, she returns to school only to find that her friends and teachers don't seem to remember her.
| 35 | 22 | "Gortimer and White Hat" | Sasie Sealy | Levi Abrino | July 15, 2016 | 222 |
After receiving some bombshell news, Gortimer escapes to the comfort of his favorite TV show, the campy 1960s superhero series, Adventures of White Hat. But once an inter-dimensional transporter gets involved, Gortimer takes his escapism to a new level.
| 36 | 23 | "Gortimer and the Lost Legends of Normal Street" | Joe Nussbaum | Garrett Frawley & Brian Turner | July 15, 2016 | 223 |
As the gang prepares a surprise birthday party for Gortimer, they take turns making video recordings of the weird, wild and wonderful stories of their adventures with Gortimer.
| 37 | 24 | "Gortimer vs. the Abnormal Formal" | Sasie Sealy | Gretchen Enders | July 15, 2016 | 224 |
As the Normal Formal approaches, Gortimer decides it's finally time to ask Abigail to the dance. But when Stanley happens upon a mysterious love potion and starts playing Cupid, Gortimer's plans unravel.
| 38 | 25 | "Gortimer vs. the Fault in Our Street" | Luke Matheny | Eric D. Wasserman | July 15, 2016 | 225 |
After Gortimer receives some devastating news that could separate him from the people he loves the most, Normal Street is beset by a puzzling series of earthquakes. The kids rush to find the source of the tremors before Normal Street literally gets torn apart.
| 39 | 26 | "Gortimer vs. The End" | Luke Matheny | David Anaxagoras & Luke Matheny | July 15, 2016 | 226 |
The trio decides to gather all the special items from their old adventures and place them safely in a time capsule. But as they accumulate mementos of their past, doubts set in about their future.

== Reception ==
Reception for Gortimer Gibbon's Life on Normal Street was positive. Brian Lowry of Variety gave it a positive review, saying "there are relatively few live-action shows intended to appeal to the prepubescent set that won't send parents fleeing from the room ... in terms of kids' TV, this sort of genuinely clever alternative is anything but normal." James Poniewozik of Time gave it a positive review, saying it was a series that "finally aims at that niche of original, non-obnoxious TV for tweens… a pleasant throwback, both in its attitude and its style." The Los Angeles Times called it "a charmer" and the New York Post called it "smart, a little zany and never pandering".

== Awards ==
| Year | Award | Category | Nominee(s) | Result | Ref |
|---|---|---|---|---|---|
| 2015 | Daytime Emmy Awards | Outstanding Single Camera Photography | Eduardo Enrique Mayén | Nominated | |
