= Exceptional Minds =

Animation school in Sherman Oaks, California

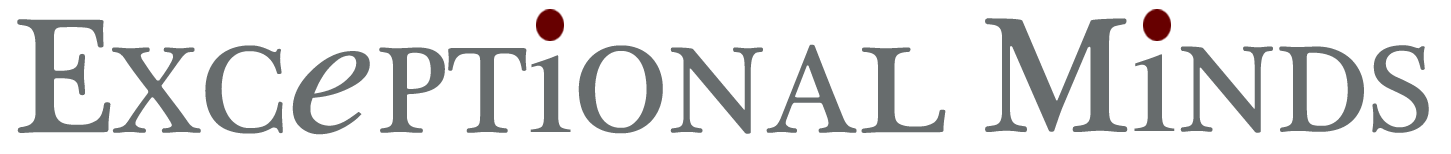

Location
- 14144 Ventura Blvd. Suite 100; Sherman Oaks, Los Angeles, California 91423; USA

Information
- School type: A non-profit vocational center and animation studio for young autistic adults
- Established: 2011; 15 years ago
- Website: exceptional-minds.org

Exceptional Minds (EM) is an American non-profit digital arts academy with attached animation and VFX studios. Established in 2011, it is the first animation studio and digital arts school specifically designed for autistic adults. It is located in Sherman Oaks, Los Angeles, California. Exceptional Minds comprises a vocational academy, post graduate program, and professional post-production studios. The organization's mission is to cultivate the talents and skills of autistic artists to facilitate their employment, self-advocacy and sharing of stories. In addition to the academy and studios, Exceptional Minds offers corporate education in the inclusion of autistic individuals in the workforce.

== Background ==
Exceptional Minds was founded in 2011 by nine entertainment industry professionals with autistic family members. They developed a media enrichment academy, funded by Bob Stevenson and Neil Young, designed specifically for autistic artists to help those artists find gainful employment in the digital arts and entertainment industry. The first class of eight students graduated in June 2014, with Ed Asner serving as commencement speaker.

The Exceptional Minds VFX Studio was founded in 2014, hiring alumni directly from the academy's alumni population. Since its inception, the EM VFX Studio has provided VFX and Titles services to over a hundred professional productions, with clients including Marvel (EM has been responsible for the end titles to every Marvel movie since Avengers: Age of Ultron), Netflix, Warner Brothers, Disney, and NBCU, HBO.

The first major project for Exceptional Minds was the end title sequence for Judy Moody and the Not Bummer Summer. In addition, EM graduate artists have also worked on post-production visual effects for films such as American Hustle (rotoscoping), Lawless (end credits), and Dawn of the Planet of the Apes (VFX roto work in stereo).

In September 2013, University of Southern California doctoral student Laura Cechanowicz released her documentary about EM titled Exceptional Minds in Transition for the USC School of Cinematic Arts video-based website, "Interacting with Autism". Later, in 2014, EM partnered with Sesame Street in an initiative that will spread "autism acceptance".

The Exceptional Minds Animation Studio was founded in 2016 to provide career pathways to graduates of the academy who had a focus on animation. Since its inception, the Exceptional Minds Animation Studio has completed projects for Nickelodeon, Cartoon Network, CBS Sports, Sloomoo Institute, and PATH Water.

In 2025, the Exceptional Minds Animation Studio launched the Autism Enlightenment Library (AEL), a public library of videos that help people understand and appreciate autistic individuals and love them for who they are. Each video in the AEL is created by a graduate of the Exceptional Minds Academy.

== Filmography ==
- Ant-Man and the Wasp: Quantumania (2023) - End credits
- Spider-Man: No Way Home (2021) - End credits
- Black Widow (2021) - Additional visual effects
- Loki (2021) - End credits
- Spider-Man: Far From Home (2019) - End credits
- Avengers: Endgame (2019) - Additional visual effects and end credits
- Avengers: Infinity War (2018) - Additional visual effects and end credits
- Black Panther (2018) - Additional visual effects and end credits
- Star Wars: The Last Jedi (2017) - Additional visual effects and end credits
- Thor: Ragnarok (2017) - Additional visual effects and end credits
- War for the Planet of the Apes (2017) - Additional visual effects
- Spider-Man: Homecoming (2017) - Additional visual effects and end credits
- The Mummy (2017) - Additional visual effects
- Guardians of the Galaxy Vol. 2 (2017) - End text credits
- The Fate of the Furious (2017) - Additional visual effects
- CHiPs (2017) - End credits
- Black Sails (season 4) (2017) - Additional visual effects
- The Shack (2017) - Main titles and end titles, Additional visual effects
- Almost Christmas (2016) - Additional visual effects
- Doctor Strange (2016) - Additional visual effects and end credits
- Miss Peregrine's Home for Peculiar Children (2016) - Additional visual effects
- Pete's Dragon (2016) - Additional visual effects
- X-Men: Apocalypse (2016) - Additional visual effects
- Captain America: Civil War (2016) - Additional visual effects and end credits
- Game of Thrones (season 6) (2016) - Additional visual effects, and roto work
- Alvin and the Chipmunks: The Road Chip (2015) - Additional visual effects
- The Hunger Games: Mockingjay - Part 2 (2015) - Additional visual effects
- Ant-Man (2015) - Additional visual effects, and end credits
- Avengers: Age of Ultron (2015) - Additional visual effects and end credits
- The SpongeBob Movie: Sponge Out of Water (2015) - Additional visual effects
- The SpongeBob Movie: Sponge on the Run (2020) - Additional visual effects and end credits (with Scarlet Letters)
- Dawn of the Planet of the Apes (2014) - VFX roto work in stereo
- American Hustle (2013) - Rotoscoping
- Crazy Kind of Love (2013) - Titles
- Lawless (2012) - End Credits
- Aftermath/Remnants (2012/II) - Titles And Opticals
- Judy Moody and the Not Bummer Summer (2011) - Titles

== Video clips and interviews ==
- Cechanowicz, Laura. Exceptional Minds in Transition. Documentary film for the Interacting With Autism Website, USC School of Cinematic Arts, September 2013.
- Dador, Denise. "Media Production Training for Adults with Autism." KABC-TV, June 6, 2014.
- Sigell, Lisa. "Group Helps Kids With Autism Connect With Their Artistic Side." KCAL-TV, July 12, 2012.
