= Guardians of the Galaxy Vol. 2 =

2017 Marvel Studios film

- Theatrical release poster
- Directed by: James Gunn
- Written by: James Gunn
- Based on: Guardians of the Galaxy by: Dan Abnett; Andy Lanning
- Produced by: Kevin Feige
- Starring: Chris Pratt; Zoe Saldaña; Dave Bautista; Vin Diesel; Bradley Cooper; Michael Rooker; Karen Gillan; Pom Klementieff; Sylvester Stallone; Kurt Russell
- Cinematography: Henry Braham
- Edited by: Fred Raskin; Craig Wood
- Music by: Tyler Bates
- Production company: Marvel Studios
- Distributed by: Walt Disney Studios Motion Pictures
- Release dates: April 10, 2017 (Tokyo); May 5, 2017 (United States)
- Running time: 136 minutes
- Country: United States
- Language: English
- Budget: $200 million
- Box office: $869.1 million

Guardians of the Galaxy Vol. 2 is a 2017 American superhero film based on the Marvel Comics superhero team Guardians of the Galaxy, produced by Marvel Studios and distributed by Walt Disney Studios Motion Pictures. It is the sequel to Guardians of the Galaxy (2014) and the 15th film in the Marvel Cinematic Universe (MCU). Written and directed by James Gunn, the film stars an ensemble cast featuring Chris Pratt, Zoe Saldaña, Dave Bautista, Vin Diesel, Bradley Cooper, Michael Rooker, Karen Gillan, Pom Klementieff, Sylvester Stallone, and Kurt Russell. In the film, the Guardians travel throughout the cosmos as they help Peter Quill (Pratt) learn more about his mysterious parentage.

The film was officially announced at the 2014 San Diego Comic-Con before the theatrical release of the first film, along with Gunn's return as writer and director from the first film, with the title of the sequel revealed a year later in June 2015. Principal photography began in February 2016 at Pinewood Atlanta Studios in Fayette County, Georgia, with many crew changes from the first film due to other commitments. Filming concluded in June 2016. Gunn chose to set the sequel shortly after the first film to explore the characters' new roles as the Guardians, and to follow the storyline of Quill's father established throughout that previous film. Russell was confirmed as Quill's father in July 2016, portraying Ego, a departure from Quill's comic father.

Guardians of the Galaxy Vol. 2 premiered in Tokyo on April 10, 2017, and was released in the United States on May 5, 2017, as part of Phase Three of the MCU. It grossed more than $869 million worldwide, making it the eighth-highest-grossing film of 2017, while also outgrossing its predecessor and becoming the highest-grossing film of the trilogy. The film received praise for its visuals, direction, soundtrack, action sequences, humor, and performances, though some critics deemed it inferior to the original. It received a nomination for Best Visual Effects at the 90th Academy Awards. A sequel, Guardians of the Galaxy Vol. 3, was released on May 5, 2023, preceded by the Disney+ special The Guardians of the Galaxy Holiday Special in November 2022.

== Plot ==
In 2014, Peter Quill, Gamora, Drax, Rocket, and Baby Groot are renowned as the Guardians of the Galaxy. High Priestess Ayesha of the Sovereign race has the Guardians protect valuable Anulax batteries from an Abilisk, an inter-dimensional monster, in exchange for Nebula, Gamora's estranged sister, who was caught attempting to steal the batteries. After Rocket steals the batteries for himself, the Sovereign attacks the Guardians' ship with a fleet of drones. A mysterious figure destroys the drones and the Guardians crash-land on nearby planet Berhert. The figure reveals himself as Ego, Quill's father, and he introduces Mantis, his naïve empath servant. Ego invites Quill, Gamora, and Drax to his home planet, while Rocket and Groot remain behind to repair the ship and watch Nebula.

Ayesha hires Yondu Udonta and his crew, who have been exiled from the greater Ravager community by Ravager leader Stakar Ogord for child trafficking, to recapture the Guardians. They capture Rocket, but when Yondu hesitates to turn over Quill, whom he raised, his lieutenant Kraglin Obfonteri questions his objectivity, and Taserface, another lieutenant, leads a mutiny, aided by Nebula, who shoots Yondu. Taserface executes Yondu's loyalists, and imprisons him and Rocket aboard Yondu's ship. Nebula leaves to find and kill Gamora, whom she blames for the torture inflicted on her by Thanos, their adoptive father. Kraglin, who is remorseful and never signed up for a mutiny, helps Groot free Rocket and Yondu, and while escaping, the group set the ship to self-destruct using Yondu's arrow. Taserface informs the Sovereign before being killed by the explosion.

Ego, a god-like Celestial that manipulated the matter around his consciousness to form his "home" planet, explains that he projected a humanoid guise to travel the universe and discover a purpose, eventually falling in love with Quill's mother Meredith. Ego hired Yondu to collect the young Quill after Meredith's death, but the boy was never delivered, and Ego has been searching for him ever since. He teaches Quill to manipulate his inherited Celestial power, while Mantis grows close to Drax and tries to warn him of Ego's plans. Nebula arrives at Ego's planet and tries to kill Gamora, but the pair reconcile and reach an uneasy alliance, soon discovering a cavern filled with skeletal remains. Ego brainwashes Quill and reveals that in his travels, he planted seedlings on thousands of worlds that can xenoform them into new extensions of himself, but only the power of two Celestials can activate them. He adds that he impregnated countless women and hired Yondu to collect their offspring but killed them all when they failed to inherit his Celestial power. When Ego admits that he gave Meredith the brain tumor that killed her, an infuriated Quill breaks out of his brainwashing and violently attacks him. Ego then parasitically draws Quill's energy to activate the seedlings, which begin to consume the worlds on which they are planted.

Rocket, Yondu, Groot, and Kraglin arrive, and together with Mantis, Drax, Nebula and Gamora, they rescue Quill. The reunited Guardians travel to Ego's brain at the planet's core, where Yondu reveals that he kept Quill to spare him from Ego. As the Sovereign's drones return and attack, Rocket makes a bomb using the stolen batteries, which Groot plants on Ego's brain. Quill uses his newfound Celestial powers to fight Ego, distracting him long enough for the other Guardians and Mantis to escape. The bomb explodes, killing Ego and disintegrating the planet, but also draining Quill of his Celestial powers. Yondu sacrifices himself to save Quill by letting himself die in the vacuum of space. Despite having reconciled with Gamora, Nebula chooses to leave and resume her quest to kill Thanos. The Guardians, with Mantis as a new member, hold a funeral for Yondu as dozens of Ravager ships arrive, having heard of Yondu's sacrifice and they accept him as a Ravager again.

In a series of mid-and post-credit scenes, Kraglin takes up Yondu's telekinetic arrow and control-fin; Stakar reunites with his ex-teammates and fellow Ravager captains; Ayesha creates Adam, a new artificial being with whom she plans to destroy the Guardians; (Note: Identified off-screen as Adam Warlock, who director James Gunn initially planned to feature prominently in the film. The character is hinted at in this mid-credits scene to set up his appearance in Guardians of the Galaxy Vol. 3.) and Groot grows into a teenager. (Note: Gunn said this sequence with an adolescent Groot is set "years after" the ending of the film, with the character appearing in the same state in Avengers: Infinity War.)

== Cast ==
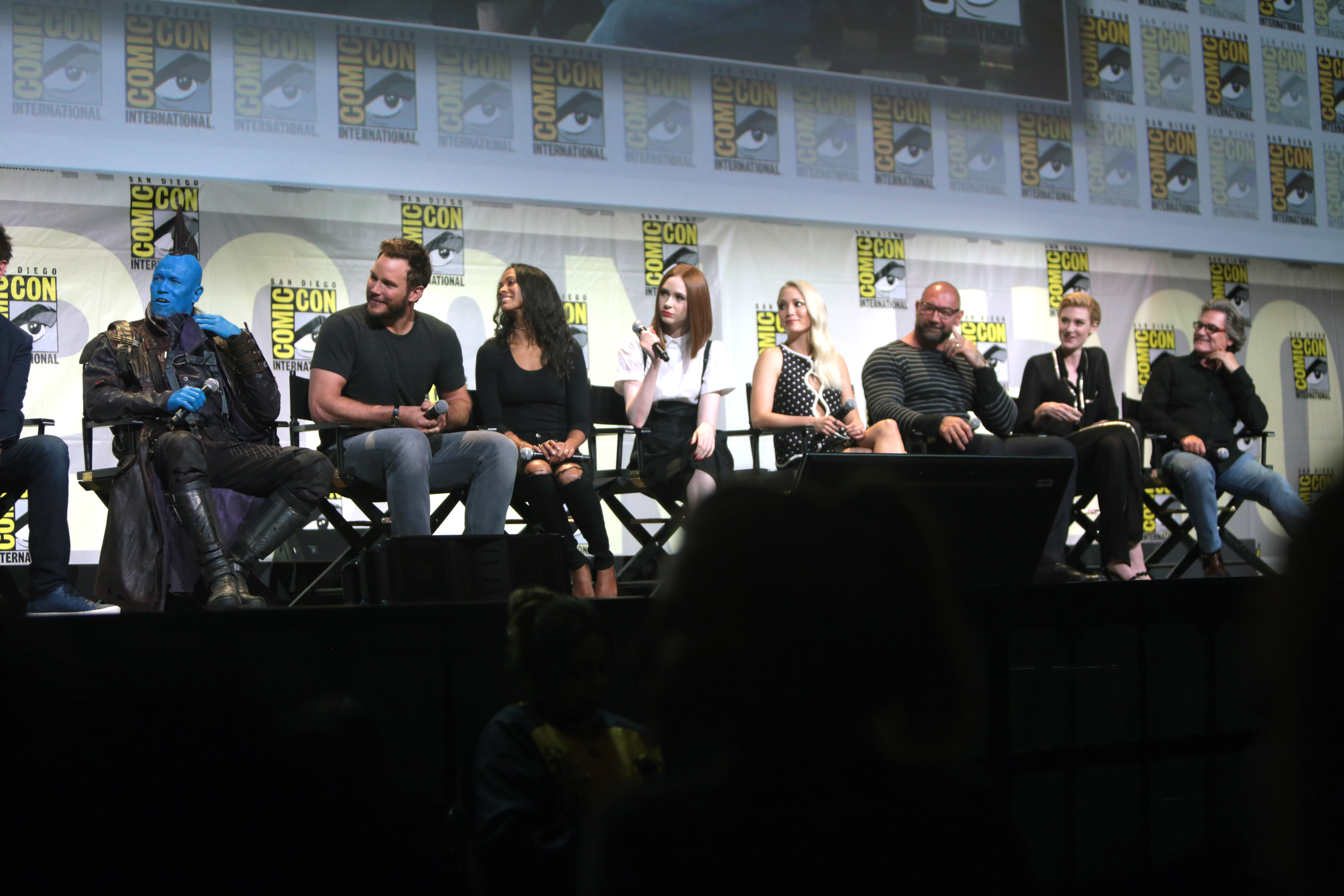
From left to right: Rooker, Pratt, Saldaña, Gillan, Klementieff, Bautista, Debicki, and Russell promoting the film at the 2016 San Diego Comic Con

- Chris Pratt as Peter Quill / Star-Lord:
  The half-human, half-Celestial leader of the Guardians of the Galaxy who was abducted from Earth as a child and raised by a group of alien thieves and smugglers called the Ravagers. Pratt, who returns as part of a multi-film contract with Marvel, said Quill is now famous throughout "the galaxy for having saved so many people... He feels like he's part of this group, a leader of this group. He's a little more responsible and trying to stay out of trouble, but not necessarily doing the best job." Pratt stated that working on the film forced him to come to terms with the death of his own father. Wyatt Oleff once again portrays a young Quill.
- Zoe Saldaña as Gamora:
  A member of the Guardians and an orphan from an alien world who seeks redemption for her past crimes. She was trained by Thanos to be his personal assassin. Saldaña described Gamora's role in the team as "the voice of reason", saying, "She's surrounded by all these dudes who are so stupid half the time," and added that she is the "Mom" of the team, saying that she is "just a meticulous, detailed, professional individual." Regarding Gamora's relationship with Nebula, Saldaña described it as "volatile" and added, "we're starting somewhere very crazy but appropriate given where we had ended things off in the first installment".
- Dave Bautista as Drax the Destroyer:
  A member of the Guardians and highly skilled warrior. Bautista waited for the final version of the script to not take "away from the magic", which he felt had happened when he read early drafts of the first film. He added that "I wasn't crazy about my part [in Vol. 2, initially]. It went a different direction than what I thought they were going to go with Drax," noting he did not "think Drax was that significant in the film". The part "clicked" for Bautista after the table read with the other cast. Bautista called Drax "more funny, driven" than in the first film, and having "a sense of innocence and heartbreak about him", despite "most people's first perception of Drax [that] he's just a big, muscly brute". Bautista's makeup took only 90 minutes to apply, down from four hours for the first film. He would have to sit in a sauna at the end of the day to get the makeup off, after his makeup test was found to be too "abrasive".
- Vin Diesel as Baby Groot:
  A member of the Guardians who is a tree-like humanoid and the accomplice of Rocket. The character began growing from a sapling at the end of the first film, with James Gunn intending for him to be fully grown by the sequel. Gunn eventually decided to keep him as "Baby Groot", which was one of the reasons the film is set only a few months after the first. Gunn described Baby Groot as the son of Groot from the first film, with Diesel explaining that "we're going to see this goofy, adorable, baby Groot [just] kinda learning as he goes." Prop master Russell Bobbitt created a 1:1 scale model of the 10-inch (25 cm) Baby Groot for filming, to use as a lighting reference and sometimes as a puppet for the actors to interact with. As Groot only communicates with the phrase "I am Groot" in different inflections, Gunn created a "Groot Version" of the script for himself and Diesel, which contains each of Groot's lines in English. Diesel used a higher register of his voice for Baby Groot, which was pitched up by seven to nine semitones depending on the take. He also delivered lines slowly to avoid any time stretching issues. Diesel recorded Groot's voice for sixteen foreign-language releases of the film (up from six in the first film). Sean Gunn provided on-set reference for adolescent Groot in the post-credit sequence.
- Bradley Cooper as Rocket:
  A member of the Guardians who is a genetically engineered raccoon-based bounty hunter, mercenary, and master of weapons and battle tactics. Sean Gunn once again served as the stand-in for the character during filming, with Cooper's performance also referenced. Sean Gunn said that "Rocket has the same sort of crisis of faith [that he had in the first film] about whether or not he belongs in this family", with James Gunn adding, "this is really about Rocket coming to terms with accepting his place within a group of people, which probably seemed like a good idea" when they were heroes together at the end of the first film, but now "he's just not very comfortable with the idea". Feige stated that the relationship between Rocket and Groot has changed, saying, "Groot was Rocket's protector in the first movie, [and now] Rocket is Groot's protector."
- Michael Rooker as Yondu Udonta:
  A blue-skinned buccaneer of the Ravagers who is a fatherly figure to Quill and member of the Guardians. He is also the former deputy to Ayesha. Yondu has a larger head fin in the film, to look closer to his comic counterpart, and Rooker worked with the prosthetic department to add gaps to his prosthetic teeth, "just like real teeth", to aid him in whistling as the character. Rooker explained that, for the sequel, Gunn "wanted people to experience more in-depth what Yondu was thinking and how he's feeling—a more serious Yondu." Rooker noted the complex relationship between Yondu and Quill where "we don't agree on things...they are constantly at each other's throats [but] Yondu truly cares about this kid." Gunn was reluctant to kill Yondu in the film, but ultimately felt that "this is a story about a father's love for his son, his ultimate love, so much love that he sacrifices himself for that, and that's what Yondu is. He is 100 percent Peter Quill's father" despite Ego being Quill's biological father. Before the release of Vol. 2, Rooker spent time on the set of Avengers: Infinity War (2018) to counteract rumors that the reason his character would not appear in that film was that he would die in this one.
- Karen Gillan as Nebula:
  An adopted daughter of Thanos who was raised with Gamora as sisters and a former enemy of the Guardians. Gillan stated the film would further explore the sisterly relationship between Nebula and Gamora, including their backstory "and what happened to these two girls growing up and actually how awful it was for them and how it has ruined their relationship", adding "we're [also] going to start to see how much pain [Thanos] actually caused [Nebula]... we really start to see the emotional crack in her character". While Gillan had to shave her head for the first film, she only had to shave half of her head for the sequel, taking away the underneath part and leaving the top. Gillan's makeup took two and a half hours to apply, down from five hours for the first film.
- Pom Klementieff as Mantis:
  A mantis-like creature and member of the Guardians with empathic powers who lives with Ego. Executive producer Jonathan Schwartz said the character "has never really experienced social interaction", and learns about "social intricacies" from the other Guardians. Klementieff added, "She was really lonely and by herself, so it's a completely new thing to meet these people and to discover new things", comparing this to a child making awkward mistakes in social situations. Mantis and Drax have an "interesting" relationship in the film due to both being "complete odd balls". Steve Englehart, Mantis' co-creator, was disappointed with the character's portrayal, saying, "That character has nothing to do with Mantis ... I really don't know why you would take a character who is as distinctive as Mantis is and do a completely different character and still call her Mantis."
- Sylvester Stallone as Stakar Ogord:
  A high-ranking Ravager who holds a grudge against Yondu. Stallone likened his character's relationship with Yondu to a father-son relationship, and called the confrontation they have in the film "pretty intense". For Stakar's acceptance of Yondu as a Ravager at the end of the film, Gunn asked Stallone to channel the "That'll do, pig" line from the film Babe (1995). Gunn described Stakar as "very important to the Marvel Universe", and said that "it's our plan to see more of Stallone" in future MCU films, though he was not sure then if that would include Guardians of the Galaxy Vol. 3 (2023).
- Kurt Russell as Ego:
  An ancient Celestial who is Quill's father. Russell portrays an avatar of Ego who is more traditionally seen in the comics in his "Living Planet" form. Pratt suggested Russell for the role, and Russell appreciated why he was wanted after seeing Pratt's performance in the first film, feeling, "That's my kinda guy. I know where that kind of goof comes from". He added, "I bring the right things [from previous roles]... I connected the dots from some of the things I've done in the past". Pratt felt Quill would know what Kurt Russell looks like and should point out that Ego looks like Russell, but Gunn rejected the idea. Ego replaces Quill's original comic book father J'son, and was allowed to be used in the film after 20th Century Fox reached a deal with Marvel Studios to return Ego's film rights in exchange for changing the power set of Negasonic Teenage Warhead, whom Fox wanted to use in Deadpool (2016). Gunn originally thought Marvel held the rights to Ego and stated that, had the deal with Fox not been made, it would have been nearly impossible to replace Ego with another character, given the extensive work done surrounding the character without any contingency plan. For the film's opening sequence, set in 1980 Missouri, Aaron Schwartz served as facial reference for the young Ego.

Elizabeth Debicki appears as Ayesha, the golden High Priestess and the leader of the Sovereign people, a genetically engineered race who are "gold and perfect and wanting to be physically and mentally impeccable". Gunn was "very specific" when writing the character, and after casting director Sarah Finn suggested Debicki, Gunn "knew right away that she was the one". Gunn highlighted the actress' beauty and 6 ft 3 in (1.91 m) height. Debicki wore platform shoes to increase her height to 6 ft 7 in (2.01 m). Chris Sullivan portrays Taserface, the leader of a mutinous group of the Ravagers. Gunn originally posted a photo of the comic book character on his social media after landing Guardians of the Galaxy, calling him "the dumbest character of all time" and saying he would never feature the character in a film. After eventually deciding to use the character in the sequel, Gunn felt the character had given himself the name Taserface and is "a real dumbass". Sullivan's makeup took two-and-a-half to three-and-a-half hours to apply each day. Sean Gunn appears as Kraglin Obfonteri, Yondu's second-in-command in the Ravagers. Kraglin has an expanded role compared to the previous film—Sean Gunn explained, "In the first film he did a lot of just saying yes and being at Yondu's side, but in this movie things take a little bit of a different turn as Kraglin has a little bit of a crisis of conscience and has to decide whether he's going to stick with Yondu or join forces with the growing faction of mutineers."

Additionally, reprising their roles from the first film are Laura Haddock as Meredith Quill, Gregg Henry as her father Jason, Seth Green as the voice of Howard the Duck, and canine actor Fred as Cosmo. Members of Yondu's Ravager crew appearing in the film include Evan Jones as Retch, Jimmy Urine as Half-Nut, Stephen Blackehart as Brahl, Steve Agee as Gef, Mike Escamilla as Scrote, Joe Fria as Oblo, Terence Rosemore as Narblik, and Tommy Flanagan as Tullk, as well as Charred Walls of the Damned drummer and Howard Stern Show personality Richard Christy in a cameo appearance. The other members of Stakar and Yondu's old team, based on the comic's original incarnation of the Guardians of the Galaxy, include Michael Rosenbaum as Martinex, Ving Rhames as Charlie-27, and Michelle Yeoh as Aleta Ogord. Also included in the team are the CG characters Krugarr and Mainframe, with the latter voiced, in an uncredited cameo, by Miley Cyrus. Rosenbaum had previously auditioned to play Peter Quill in Vol. 1. Gunn cast Yeoh because of his love of 1990s Hong Kong films, and Cyrus after admiring "the tone of her voice" while watching her as a coach on The Voice. He added that the team would return in future MCU films alongside Stallone's Stakar.

Stan Lee appears as an informant to the Watchers, discussing previous adventures that include his cameos in other MCU films; he specifically mentions his time as a FedEx delivery man, which connects to Lee's cameo as a FedEx delivery man in Captain America: Civil War (2016). This acknowledged the fan theory that Lee may be portraying the same character in all his cameos, with Gunn noting that "people thought Stan Lee is a Watcher and that all of these cameos are part of him being a Watcher. So, Stan Lee as a guy who is working for the Watchers was something that I thought was fun for the MCU." Feige added that Lee "clearly exists, you know, above and apart from the reality of all the films. So the notion that he could be sitting there on a cosmic pit stop during the jump gate sequence in Guardians...really says, so wait a minute, he's this same character who's popped up in all these films?" Lee filmed several different versions of the scene, including an alternative where he references his role in Deadpool, which would have been the first acknowledgment of the X-Men film series by an MCU film. Gunn later admitted that the Civil War reference is a continuity error, given Vol. 2 is set before the events of Civil War, saying, "I screwed up; I wasn't thinking. But I'm going to say that probably Stan Lee used the guise of a FedEx guy more than one time."

David Hasselhoff makes a cameo appearance as himself, when Ego shape-shifts to his likeness, while Rob Zombie once again has a Ravager voice cameo. Footage of Jeff Goldblum dancing as the Grandmaster from the set of Thor: Ragnarok (2017) is used briefly during the end credits, with Feige explaining that Marvel "thought it would be fun to put it in there" especially since the comic version of Grandmaster is the brother of the Collector, who appeared in the first Guardians film. Ben Browder, the star of the series Farscape, of which Gunn is an avid fan, cameos as a Sovereign Admiral. Molly Quinn appears as Howard the Duck's date. Jim Gunn Sr. and Leota Gunn, parents of James and Sean Gunn, also make cameo appearances in the film as an elderly couple on Earth. Jimmy Kimmel Live!'s Guillermo Rodriguez has an uncredited cameo appearance as a police officer on Earth when the seedling was xenoforming.

== Production ==
=== Development ===
"There are general ideas for what the sequel is and where it goes and who's involved and what happens and what we find out about our characters. So it's very general and that could change ... but I know a lot about who these characters are and where they came from and where they're going. I'm excited by the possibility of creating a sequel because we had to do a lot of setup in [the first] movie and with a sequel we don't have to do that setup which will make it so much easier for me."

— James Gunn, writer and director of Guardians of the Galaxy Vol. 2, on the state of the sequel in August 2014

In May 2014, Disney CEO Bob Iger stated he felt the first Guardians of the Galaxy film (2014) had "strong franchise potential". He added that their goal was to create "another Avengers (2012)". James Gunn, who directed and co-wrote the first film, said that he would like to return for a sequel and that he was contractually obligated to if asked. The next month, producer Kevin Feige said there are "places we can take [the franchise] and we have ideas of where we'd like to go" based on the wide array of characters, worlds and storylines from the comics. In July 2014, Guardians of the Galaxy co-screenwriter Nicole Perlman confirmed a sequel, saying it was "going to happen" due to the positive internal response to the first film at Disney, and that Gunn would write and direct. At San Diego Comic-Con soon after, the sequel was given a release date of July 28, 2017.

Gunn had begun work on the film within a month, and said it would include at least one new Guardian from the comics. In October, Gunn confirmed that all five original Guardians would return for the sequel, along with other supporting characters, and the release date was moved up to May 5, 2017. In the following months, Michael Rooker said he would return as Yondu Udonta, and was looking forward to exploring new areas of the character. Chris Pratt, who played Peter Quill/Star-Lord in the first film, confirmed the sequel would be one of his next projects. Bradley Cooper expressed interest and excitement when asked if he would return as Rocket. Vin Diesel also confirmed he would return as Groot. In March 2015, Gunn revealed that filming would take place in Atlanta, Georgia with "major crew changes" from the first film, and that his brother, Sean Gunn, would return as Kraglin Obfonteri alongside Karen Gillan as Nebula. He explained his relationship with Marvel Studios, saying the company "let me go and do my thing, and I truly listen to their notes and ideas. I've never been told to put in any character or plot element at all... When they trust you they give you a wide berth... we just fit".

In May, Gunn said the sequel would feature fewer characters than the first film, and that he had planned to introduce two major new characters in the script—Mantis and Adam Warlock. Talks had begun with an actor Gunn had in mind to portray Mantis, while he had decided to remove Warlock due to the film "getting too busy", explaining, "one of the main things with Guardians of the Galaxy is not to add a bunch of characters, not to make it bigger in that way but to go deeper with the characters... and getting to know them more emotionally... everything is just getting too sprawling and too crazy for me in these superhero comic book movies". Gunn added, "I adored what we had done with him. I think we did something really creative and unique with Adam Warlock. But it was one character too many and I didn't want to lose Mantis and Mantis was more organically part of the movie anyway". He noted that Warlock could appear in future Guardians films, and is considered "a pretty important part" of the cosmic side of the Marvel Cinematic Universe (MCU). The character's future introduction is hinted at in one of the film's mid-credits scenes. Gunn noted that Marvel gave him "some blowback" for including the Warlock teaser because they felt fans would believe the character would be appearing in Avengers: Infinity War (2018) and Avengers: Endgame (2019), which was not the case. By including the scene, Gunn promised Marvel he would use his social media presence to clarify for fans that the character would not be seen in either of the Avengers films; Gunn used the character in his sequel Guardians of the Galaxy Vol. 3 (2023), but found it difficult to feature the character in that story, believing it was "kind of fitting a weird square peg into a round hole".

==== Writing ====
After the film's announcement, Gunn said he knew "a lot of where I want to go [in the sequel]", having written the backstory of Peter Quill, his father and his history with Yondu during the making of the first film with the intention of exploring them in a future film. Gunn's earliest idea for a Guardians sequel involved Rocket and Groot starring as the main characters in a story fleshing out the former's origin story, but Gunn felt that he had to flesh out Peter Quill's origins first. Gunn wanted to give the sequel a different structure from the first film, since "one of the reasons people like Guardians is because it's fresh and different, so the second one will be fresh and different from the first one". Before starting on the script, Gunn hoped to further explore Drax, Nebula, Kraglin and the Collector and expand on Xandarian, Kree, Krylorian and Ravager culture. He also hoped to introduce more female characters in the sequel, though wanted to avoid including "earthlings" such as Carol Danvers, as well as Novas Richard Rider or Sam Alexander, saying, "I think Quill being the only earthling is important. That serves the entire movie-going audience and not just the handful of Nova [and Carol Danvers] fans". The character Darkhawk had also been considered for the film.

Feige said exploring Quill's father "would certainly be part of a next Guardians adventure", adding "I think there's a reason we seeded it at the very end of the [first] film like that". Gunn also stated that he wanted to make sure "Yondu's place in everything made sense" in regards to his relationship to Quill and his father, and also revealed Quill's father would not be J'son as in the comics. Gunn "was less confident [Marvel] was going to buy in on Baby Groot than" including Ego, since "adult Groot was the most popular character from the first film and I didn't think they'd want to risk a good thing". However, by changing Groot, Gunn felt it "opened the film up" creatively, allowing Gunn to bring out "new aspects of our other characters". Gunn said Thanos would only appear in the sequel "if he helps our story and he will not show up at all if not. Thanos is not the most important thing in Guardians 2, that's for damn sure. There's the Guardians themselves and other threats the Guardians are going to be facing that are not Thanos". Feige later confirmed that Thanos would not appear in the sequel, as he was being saved for a "grander" return. When asked about how the film would connect with the other Phase Three films in the Marvel Cinematic Universe, Gunn said, "I don't feel beholden to that stuff at all. I think it's really about the Guardians and what they are doing".

Gunn set the film two to three months after the first film "because he felt the group are just such fragile egos and he didn't think this story could start years later". Major planets visited in the film include Sovereign, Berhart and Contraxia. Feige also stated two or three other worlds would be seen, as well as "a little bit of Earth in this film, but it's not these characters going to Earth". In December 2014, Gunn revealed the story for the film was written, saying, "It's [still] constantly shifting, but I feel like it's pretty strong. I'm excited about it". By early February 2015, Gunn was "a few short weeks" away from submitting a full story treatment to Marvel, and said that when he first presented his idea for the sequel to the company they thought it was "risky". He described it as "not really based on anything" from the comics, being mainly an original story. Gunn later referred to the full treatment as a "scriptment", "a 70-page combination of a script and a treatment and it goes through every beat of the movie". By April, he was preparing to write the screenplay, and in May he was hoping to complete the script before he began work on The Belko Experiment (2016) in June 2015.

As he developed the story, Gunn considered to have Gamora killed off due to Zoe Saldaña's original expectations to only play the role in the first film. As he knew that Saldaña did not wish to play Gamora for a few years, Gunn considered to have Gamora sacrifice herself at the end of the film to save Peter so he could learn about himself, but Feige and Louis D'Esposito talked Gunn out from taking that decision because it did not work well with the story, in addition to their plans to have Gamora die in Infinity War instead as the Russo brothers informed Gunn during months of planning Vol. 2. After discussing it with Marvel and realizing that it would be better for Gamora to die in the third Avengers film, Gunn ultimately concluded that the story naturally progressed in a way that insisted that Yondu Udonta should be the one to die at the end to rescue Quill despite Gunn's initial reluctance in killing off Michael Rooker's character due to their friendship, but in retrospective, Gunn felt that the story worked out in a perfect way to set up Guardians of the Galaxy Vol. 3.

=== Pre-production ===
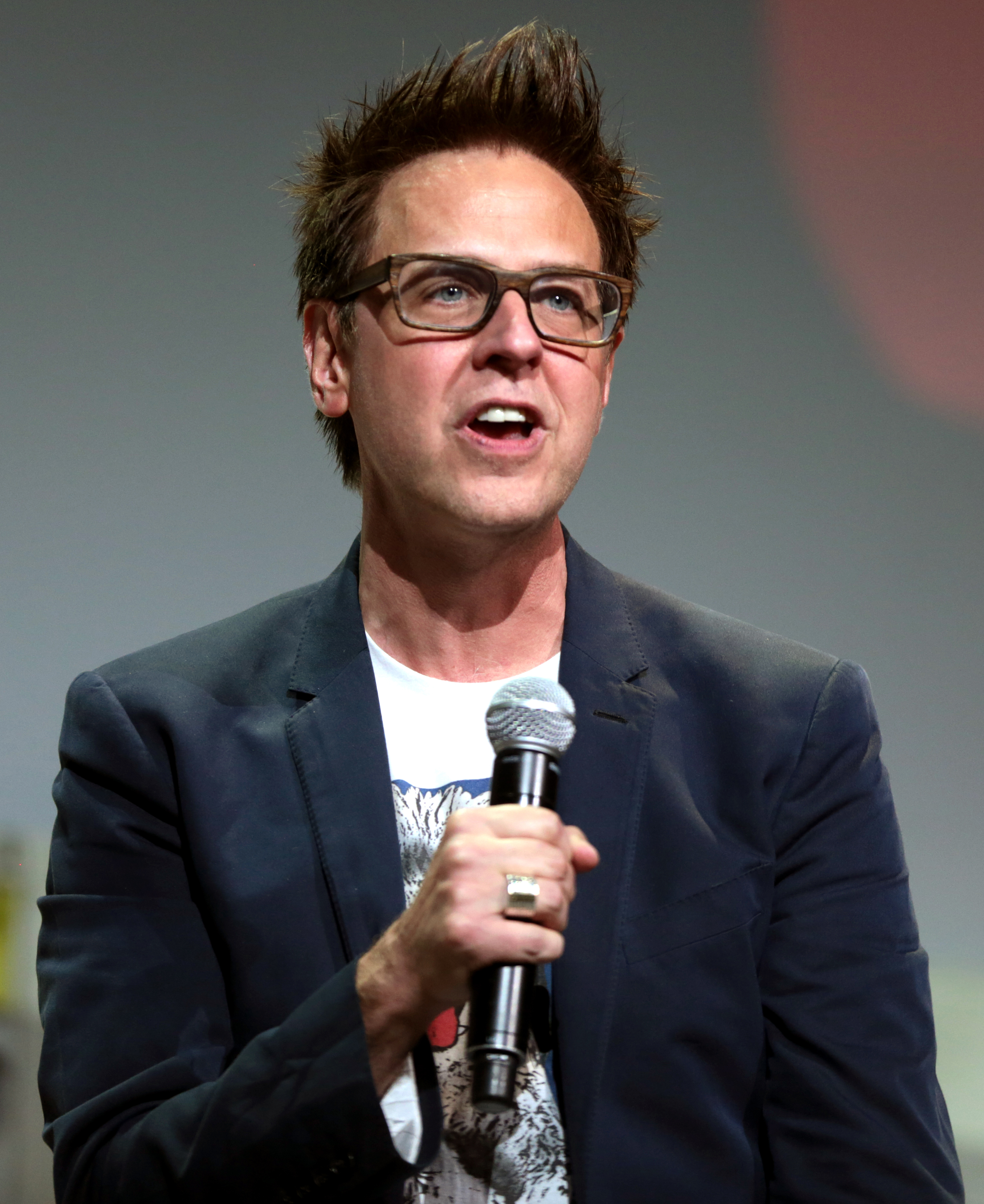
Gunn promoting Guardians of the Galaxy Vol. 2 at the 2016 San Diego Comic-Con

On June 2, 2015, Gunn announced on social media that he had completed the first draft of the screenplay, and that the film's title would not simply be Guardians of the Galaxy 2. The same week, he confirmed the return of Saldaña, Dave Bautista and Cooper as Gamora, Drax and Rocket, respectively. At the end of the month, Gunn announced the film would be titled Guardians of the Galaxy Vol. 2, saying he "came up with a LOT of titles for Vol. 2. But because 'Guardians of the Galaxy' is already so wordy, it seemed strange to add another bunch of words after it. I liked Vol. 2 the best, so that's what I stuck on the cover of the screenplay—and, fortunately, [Marvel] liked it".

In September 2015, Gunn said in a Facebook post that he wanted to use Sneepers, an alien race that first appeared in Marvel Comics in 1964, as background characters in the film, but was advised against it by Marvel's legal department because the name was too similar to snípur, the Icelandic word for clitoris. The Marvel legal department later cleared the use of Sneepers in the film, in part because of all the media coverage Gunn's initial post received. At the end of the month, Feige stated casting announcements would be made before the end of 2015, and by the end of October, Pom Klementieff was cast as Mantis. Also, it was reported that Matthew McConaughey had recently turned down the role of "the villain" in the film, in favor of The Dark Tower (2017). McConaughey felt he would have been "an amendment" in Vol. 2 in "a colorful part [made] for another big-name actor". In December, Gunn said that he was corresponding with John C. Reilly about him reprising his role as Nova Corpsman Rhomann Dey, while Kurt Russell entered early talks to play Quill's father. After the death of David Bowie in January 2016, Gunn said that there had been discussions for Bowie to appear in the film as a member of Yondu's original crew. Gunn also stated that he had completed the final draft of the script. Benicio del Toro, who portrayed the Collector in the first film, expressed interest in portraying the character again, despite Marvel not contacting him about the sequel; Gunn explained that the Collector "just didn't fit" into Vol. 2. In early February, comedian Steve Agee was revealed to be in the film.

Prop master Russell Bobbitt had difficulty finding the cassette decks that had been used in the first film, and all of the Sony Walkman headsets they sourced for the sequel were broken. Sony also did not have any headsets available for filming, while three pairs Bobbitt found on eBay cost around $1,800 and were not the exact model. Bobbitt eventually created six from scratch for Vol. 2. Other props he created for the film included two sets of blasters for Quill, with removable blaster cartridges, and "steampunk-looking weapons and belts" for the Ravagers; Bobbitt explained that four different weapons were designed for the latter group, and then 15–20 versions of those were produced to be used by the various Ravager actors (there could be up to 85–95 Ravagers per scene). For their belts, the props team cut the leather themselves rather than buying existing belts, and then parts from different electronic devices such as radios and cell phones were glued together to make each belt "a unique piece of art". The prop department also made edible props for certain scenes: a prop of a stinkbug-inspired insect was made from chocolate and injected with black honey so it could be eaten on screen and "when he bit down the honey poured out of his mouth"; similarly, a "yarrow root" was designed based on enlarged images of pollen, and then created with non-dairy white chocolate to be eaten onscreen.

=== Filming ===
Pre-shooting began on February 11, 2016, at Pinewood Atlanta Studios in Fayette County, Georgia, under the working title Level Up, with Henry Braham serving as cinematographer and Scott Chambliss as production designer. Gunn noted that many of the crew from the first film, such as cinematographer Ben Davis and production designer Charles Wood, signed on to work on Doctor Strange (2016), and due to a late change in production schedule for that film, were unable to work on Vol. 2.

Principal photography began on February 17, with Marvel confirming that Russell had joined the cast, and revealing that Elizabeth Debicki and Chris Sullivan had also been cast, all in undisclosed roles. The production used all 18 stages at Pinewood Atlanta Studios, an increase in stage space from what was used for the first film. Gunn said the sequel required more sets than the first and "our sets are very large, even though a lot of the film is CGI. I like to have as many practical sets as we can and make the environments as real as possible so it balances out the CGI elements". Despite this, Gunn noted that there were fewer locations featured in the sequel, with the focus instead on being more specific and detailed with fewer places shown. Sets constructed for the film included several for the Sovereign planet, for which Chambliss used a "1950s pulp fiction variation on 1930s art deco design aesthetic"; the Ravager's main ship in the film, the Eclector, which was constructed in sections to provide a complete 360-degree view of the ship as well as the ability to move sections around and portray different areas of the ship; and the Iron Lotus establishment on the "pleasure planet" of Contraxia, which Chambliss wanted to feel like it had been put together from "a whole yard of repurposed junk where old spaceships are cast away and industrial materials that aren't of use anymore are just left to rot", creating a "kind of neon jungle in its own way and covered in ice and snow". Interiors for other ships were also constructed, to limit the amount of blue screen the actors had to interact with; this includes the cockpit of Quill's ship that had been built for the first film before being stored in London which was transported to Atlanta for the sequel. Originally shot was a scene featuring Star-Lord and Gamora kissing, establishing themselves as a couple, but Gunn ultimately cut the scene due to feeling that the kiss happened in a "weird time". He would later beg the Infinity War filmmakers to include the kiss there.

Vol. 2 was the first film to be shot with an 8K resolution camera, the Red Weapon 8K. Braham had wanted to use a different camera than the Alexa 65 that had been used for several other Marvel films, because he found it to be a "very big and heavy camera". He wanted a camera that could deliver equivalent image quality to the Alexa 65, and tested multiple options. He eventually met with Red employees, whom he had a positive experience with working on The Legend of Tarzan (2016), and they introduced him to an early prototype for the Weapon 8K. He, Gunn, and Marvel decided to use the camera in September 2015, when only that single prototype existed, and spent three months working with Red to get the camera ready for filming. For the sequence where Rocket and Yondu escape from the Ravagers, a Phantom Camera was used to film scenes up to 2,000 frames per second, with the footage able to be moved from slow-motion to high-speed within a single shot. Each shot using the camera had to be carefully set up and choreographed. Additional scenes were also shot in IMAX and its aspect ratio. Braham filmed almost 85 percent of the film using a stabilizing technology he had contributed to called Stabileye, which he called "a handheld dolly" which allowed "a spontaneity to the way the camera moves that is different and that felt appropriate for this movie". For filming the cockpits of spaceships, Braham surrounded the practical sets with video panels and other light sources that he could use to create realistic lighting no matter the environment outside the ship. Exteriors of the ships were filmed with the camera on a technocrane, but any shots inside the cockpits again used the Stabileye which is "so small that you can get it in there next to the actors".

In April 2016, Gunn revealed that Reilly would not be part of the film, and stated that there were many other characters he could not include in the film due to rights issues, saying that 20th Century Fox "owns so many awesome cosmic villains and minor characters that I'd love to play around with" such as Annihilus and Kang the Conqueror. Gunn also planned on filming scenes with Glenn Close, reprising her role as Nova Prime Irani Rael from the first film. When filming Stan Lee's cameo, Gunn also filmed two other cameo appearances with Lee including one for Doctor Strange, to limit the amount of travel Lee had to do. Additional filming for Vol. 2 took place in Cartersville, Georgia, a state park north of Portland, Oregon, and in St. Charles, Missouri. The Georgia International Convention Center served as additional soundstage space after pre-production on Spider-Man: Homecoming (2017) began at several Pinewood Atlanta Studios soundstages. Principal photography wrapped on June 16, 2016.

=== Post-production ===
At San Diego Comic-Con in 2016, Russell and Debicki were revealed to be playing Ego, Quill's father, and Ayesha, respectively. Sylvester Stallone was also revealed to be in the film, with his role later revealed as Stakar Ogord. Gunn also introduced multiple actors who were playing Ravager characters, since the Ravagers have a larger presence in the film. On the decision to reveal Russell as Ego and Quill's father when he did, Gunn felt that since "people were going to figure it out eventually [...] it was better that we took the reins in our own hands" and make the reveal. Gunn also felt that this would move the focus of audiences from wanting to discover who Quill's father is to "the story and the relationship that these characters have". In August 2016, Gunn confirmed the film would feature a post-credits scene, later stating there would be five in total, with four mid-credits scenes and one post-credits. Gunn also planned a sixth scene, where the Ravager Gef is found "mortally wounded" on the ship, but "it ended up being a little confusing".

In November, Gillan revealed that the film was undergoing reshoots. That February, it was reported that the film had scored a perfect 100 in test screenings, the highest for any Marvel Studios film. The Hollywood Reporter noted this score could not necessarily be compared to any non-Marvel movies due to Marvel's specific testing process that selects its audience "from a more select pool of recruits, what it terms 'friends and families screenings'". In March 2017, Gunn revealed that Michael Rosenbaum would appear in the film, and that Gunn would provide reference for Baby Groot's dancing "in a much bigger way [than the first film]. I actually had to do like a full day's worth of dancing to get Groot's dance down this time. Last time it was me in front of an iPhone, and this time it's me dancing on a huge soundstage and shooting it from five different angles". Fred Raskin and Craig Wood returned from the first film to serve as editors. On scenes that were cut from the film, Gunn said Nathan Fillion, who had had a voice cameo in the first film, was going to appear as Simon Williams in a sequence that would have shown several movie posters for films starring Williams, including films in which he portrays Arkon and Tony Stark. Gunn chose Williams for Fillion's cameo because he wanted Fillion to have a bigger role in the MCU at some point and so did not want to give him a role that could prevent him from taking a more substantial one later. Gunn still considered Fillion's cameo canon to the MCU, despite it being cut. He also confirmed that Close's scenes had been cut from the film, because it felt like he "was trying to cram Nova Prime into the second movie as opposed to having it happen organically".

==== Visual effects ====
Ego's planet (top) was designed to be "highly geometric" and made extensive use of fractals, including Apollonian gaskets (bottom).

Visual effects for the film were created by Framestore, Weta Digital, Trixter, Method Studios, Animal Logic, Scanline VFX, Lola VFX, Luma, and Cantina Creative. Previsualization was done by The Third Floor. Framestore created 620 shots for the film, Weta Digital created 530, Method Studios more than 500, and Animal Logic created 147. Framestore once again created Rocket and Groot, with Method Studios, Weta Digital and Trixter also working on Rocket. Framestore rebuilt Rocket "from the ground up" for Vol. 2, giving him an updated fur simulation, new facial shapes and phonemes, as well as a new eye rig, which came from a rig used for the character Gnarlack from Fantastic Beasts and Where to Find Them (2016). Trixter's work on Rocket included when he sets off a trap for the Ravagers, additionally working on the sequence when Rocket, Yondu and Kraglin jump across space. Other work from Framestore included creatures, spaceships, Ayesha's lair, the space chase, the Eclector scenes, and the adolescent Groot post-credit scene.

Framestore also created the film's opening sequence. Despite appearing as a single shot, it ultimately was composed of 11 different visual effect shots. Gunn provided reference video for Baby Groot's dancing in the sequence. Framestore animation supervisor Arslan Elver noted that the majority of the opening sequence includes CGI and digital doubles, with three moments (Quill falling on the ground near Baby Groot, Gamora talking to Baby Groot, and Drax rolling behind Baby Groot) consisting of actual photography. As with the first film, Sarofsky created the typography for the opening, using the same style from Guardians of the Galaxy for consistency, "this time in rusty gold and glowing blue neon". Executive Creative Director Erin Sarofsky noted the challenge of placing the credits while the sequence was being refined by Framestore. Sarofsky proposed several different options for the credits, including having "a little hovering character that projected a hologram up on the screen", but Gunn did not want another character in the sequence to deal with. A simpler 2D option was used instead. Sarofsky also worked on the end credits, the first time for the company, integrating the actual credits from company Exceptional Minds with designs inspired by old music album art, taking albums and scanning them for their old textures and scratches.

The destruction of the Ravager ship the Eclector was handled by Weta Digital. Weta Digital also handled Ego during his fight with Quill, utilizing a digital double of Russell for many of their shots. Weta also needed to create a digital double for David Hasselhoff for the moment when Ego shifts into Hasselhoff's guise. Guy Williams, Weta's visual effects supervisor, said, "We tried morphing to a live-action Hoff—but it did not hold up as well. The Kurt version looked better than the Hoff version ... and while we had built a very detailed Kurt digi-double ... we didn't want to go to the same level on the Hoff for just two shots. But in the end we did have to do a partial build digi-double of the Hoff. The reason we did the Kurt digi-double in the first place was to make sure all the effects stuck correctly to the body ... so we went with the approach of a full digi-double, the hair, the side of the face everything on Kurt. For the Hoff, we got pretty close, but it is not quite as detailed as for Kurt". Additional work by Weta included the inside of Ego's planet, known as the Planet Hollow, which was inspired by the fractal art of Hal Tenny, who Gunn hired to help design Ego's environment. Gunn added that there are "over a trillion polygons on Ego's planet," calling it "the biggest visual effect of all time. There's nothing even close to it".

Animal Logic and Method Studios also worked on the various parts of Ego's planet, with Animal Logic focusing on Ego's cathedral, and Method on the arrival sequence and Baby Groot's "not that button" sequence in the Planet Hollow. Animal Logic's work for Ego's cathedral was also based on fractal art. The team at Animal Logic were initially brought on to the film to work on the story vignettes that were used to explain the backstory, which started as oil paintings before evolving to falling sand, and eventually the final plastic sculptures that were used. Method also created the film's final sequence for Yondu's funeral. To make Rocket shedding a tear convincing, Method used in-house footage of Animation Supervisor Keith Roberts "performing the scene for reference, studying the macro facial movements like minor eye darts or blinks, in addition to what was filmed on set and in the sound booth by" Cooper. Additional work included the scenes on the planet Berhart. Lola VFX worked on de-aging Russell, having previously done similar work in other MCU films; they also added to various characters, including Nebula. To achieve the younger Ego, Lola referenced Russell's performance in Used Cars (1980), as "he had a lot of the [facial] action" the visual effects artists were looking for. They also used a younger stand in, Aaron Schwartz, since he had "big broad jaw, chin, and most importantly the way the laugh lines move[d] and crease[d] as he talk[ed]", similar to Russell's. Laura Haddock, reprising her role from the first film of Meredith Quill in the sequence, was also slightly de-aged to play the younger version of that character. Luma worked on the Sovereign people and their world, and Adam Warlock's cocoon.

== Music ==
By August 2014, Gunn had "some ideas listed, but nothing for sure" in terms of songs to include in Quill's Awesome Mix Vol. 2 mixtape, for which he felt "a little pressure" due to the positive response to the first film's soundtrack. Gunn added, "But I feel like the soundtrack in the second one is better." By June 2015, Gunn had chosen all of the songs and built them into the script, calling Awesome Mix Vol. 2 "more diverse" than the first one, with "some really incredibly famous songs and then some songs that people have never heard." Tyler Bates was confirmed to score the film by August 2015, returning from the first film. As with Guardians of the Galaxy, Bates wrote some of the score first so Gunn could film to the music, as opposed to Bates scoring to the film. Recording for the score occurred in January 2017 at Abbey Road Studios. Guardians of the Galaxy Vol. 2: Awesome Mix Volume 2, along with the film score album composed by Bates, were released on April 21, 2017. A cassette version of Awesome Mix Volume 2 was released on June 23, 2017, while a deluxe-edition vinyl LP featuring both Awesome Mix Volume 2 and Bates' score was released on August 11, 2017.

== Marketing ==
In June 2016, Marvel announced plans for an expanded merchandising program for the sequel, with Groot playing a central role. Gunn ensured the film's female characters received more representation in the merchandise than in the first. Paul Gitter, senior vice president of licensing at Disney Consumer Products, said they intended to build Guardians of the Galaxy into a tentpole franchise. Partners in the campaign included Hasbro, Lego, Funko, LB Kids, GEICO, Ford Motor Company, Go-Gurt, Hanes, Synchrony Bank, Dairy Queen, M&M's, Screenvision, Sprint Corporation, and Wrigley Company. Additionally, Marvel partnered with Doritos for their Rock Out Loud campaign to create a custom "limited-edition series of Doritos bags featuring a built-in cassette tape deck-inspired player that plays" Awesome Mix Vol. 2 and can be recharged. The custom bags were available to purchase on Amazon.com, with Doritos also hosting Rock Out Loud pop-up recording booths in New York and Los Angeles where fans could sing the songs from Awesome Mix Vol. 2 and have the opportunity to win various prizes, including the custom bags, concert tickets, and free bags of Doritos."

In July 2016, Gunn, Pratt and other members of the cast attended San Diego Comic-Con to promote the film, showing footage and revealing additional character information. On October 19, a "sneak peek" teaser was released ahead of the first full teaser trailer. Ethan Anderton of /Film felt the teaser was strong, despite not showing any of the new characters or relying on Baby Groot, while The A.V. Club's Esther Zuckerman called it "an immediate crowd-pleaser". According to media-measurement firm Comscore and its PreAct service, the teaser was the top trailer for the week it released, generating 108,000 new social media conversations. In early December, before Gunn revealed the first teaser trailer at Comic Con Experience 2016, he said that finding scenes and moments to showcase in the trailer without revealing too much of the film resulted in hard choices, since "people really go through every single little shot and try to figure out what the movie's about. And there's a lot of mysteries in Guardians 2." Describing the teaser trailer, Jacob Hall of /Film noted that the trailer was able to succeed without giving too much away as it focused on character interactions rather than plot. The teaser trailer received 81 million views in 24 hours, becoming the second-most viewed teaser behind Beauty and the Beast and largest Marvel Studios teaser ever. Additionally, Sweet's "Fox on the Run" reached number one on the iTunes Rock Chart after featuring in the teaser.

A second trailer aired during Super Bowl LI. Germain Lussier for io9 called it "hilarious", while Anderton said it was "one hell of a" Super Bowl spot, "one that probably overshadows the game itself for people like me... There's plenty of badass cosmic action, the humor we all love, a stellar soundtrack, and some great new footage from the sequel." The spot generated the most Twitter conversation volume during the game with 47,800 conversations, according to Comscore, who measured the volume of trailers that aired during the game from the time it aired through the end of the game. The film also topped a Fandango survey of fans' favorite film trailer during the Super Bowl. An additional trailer debuted on February 28, 2017, on Jimmy Kimmel Live!. Haleigh Foutch at Collider felt the trailer added "hype" to the film, and was "just an all-around wonderful trailer, lit up with the wacky humor and irreverent charm that made the first film such a hit, with an extra dose of visual splendor." Pratt and Saldaña appeared at the 2017 Kids' Choice Awards, where they debuted an exclusive clip. In mid-July, Marvel created a 1980s-inspired infomercial and an 800 number to promote the film's home media release.

== Release ==
=== Theatrical ===
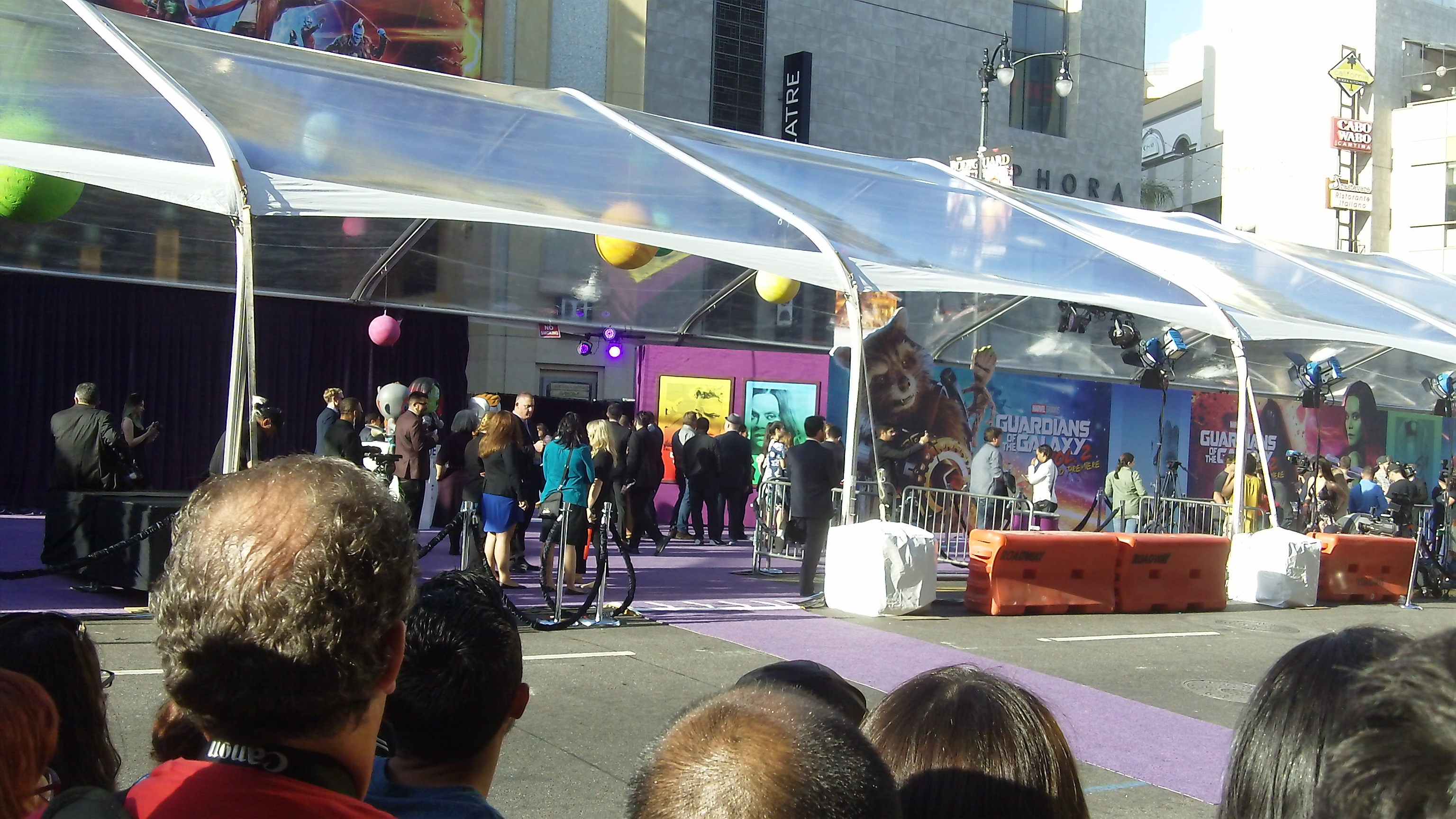
Premiere of Guardians of the Galaxy Vol. 2 at the Dolby Theatre in Hollywood, Los Angeles

Guardians of the Galaxy Vol. 2 made its world premiere in Tokyo on April 10, 2017, and its Hollywood, Los Angeles, premiere on April 19 at the Dolby Theatre. The film began its international release on April 25, in Australia, New Zealand, and Italy, alongside a total of 37 markets in its first weekend, with 176 IMAX screens in 35 of those markets. It opened in the United States on May 5 in 4,347 theaters, of which over 3,800 were in 3D, 388 in IMAX and IMAX 3D, 588 premium large-format, and 194 D-Box locations. The film's opening in China was in 400 IMAX theaters, the largest ever for the country. On May 4, 2017, 550 theaters in the United States had a special RealD Guardians of the Galaxy double feature event before preview screenings of Vol. 2. Guests who attended received an exclusive mini poster and a set of souvenir collectible buttons. Vol. 2 was originally intended to be released on July 28, 2017. The film is part of Phase Three of the MCU.

=== Home media ===
Guardians of the Galaxy Vol. 2 was released on digital download by Walt Disney Studios Home Entertainment on August 8, 2017, and on Blu-ray, Blu-ray 3D, Ultra HD Blu-ray, and DVD on August 22. The Ultra HD Blu-ray version is the first Disney home media release in 4K resolution. The digital and Blu-ray releases include behind-the-scenes featurettes, audio commentary, deleted scenes, a blooper reel, and a music video for the song "Guardians Inferno". The digital release also exclusively features the breakdown of three scenes, from their initial ideas to their completed versions, and a behind-the-scenes look at the Guardians of the Galaxy – Mission: Breakout!, an accelerated drop tower dark ride attraction at Disney California Adventure. The 1970s-style music video for "Guardians Inferno" was directed by David Yarovesky and features Hasselhoff alongside James Gunn, Pratt, Saldaña, Bautista, Klementieff, Gillan, Rooker, and Sean Gunn. Stan Lee and Guillermo Rodriguez also make cameo appearances in the video.

The digital release of the film had the most digital downloads and largest opening week of any Marvel Studios film. The physical releases in its first week of sale were the top home media release, selling "nearly three times as many discs as the rest of the top 10 sellers combined", according to NPD VideoScan data. The Blu-ray version accounted for 83% of the sales, with 10% of total sales coming from the Ultra HD Blu-ray version. In its second week, the film was once again the top home media release. As well, total sales of Vol. 2 in the United Kingdom were more than the other films in the top 40 combined; it was also the top film in the country. The IMAX Enhanced version of the film was made available on Disney+ beginning on November 12, 2021.

== Reception ==
=== Box office ===
Guardians of the Galaxy Vol. 2 grossed over $389.8 million in the United States and Canada, and over $473.9 million in other countries, for a worldwide total of $863.8 million. The film had earlier surpassed the first film's gross ($773 million) by Memorial Day weekend, three weeks after release, with $783.3 million worldwide, and became the fifth-highest-grossing MCU film a week later. Deadline Hollywood calculated the film's net profit as $157 million, accounting for production budgets, marketing, talent participations, and other costs; box office grosses and home media revenues placed it ninth on their list of 2017's "Most Valuable Blockbusters".

Vol. 2 was the top film in terms of advance ticket sales on Fandango, from April 24, 2017 when they went on sale until its opening weekend; this surpassed the advance sales of Avengers: Age of Ultron (2015) in the similar time frame. Over 80% of sales on MovieTickets.com were for the film ahead of its release. Vol. 2 earned $146.5 million in its opening weekend in the United States and Canada, with IMAX contributing $13 million. The $17 million that came from Thursday night previews was the highest preview amount of 2017. The film had previously been projected to earn upwards of $160 million in its opening weekend, with Deadline Hollywood predicting it could reach the $179 million debut of Captain America: Civil War. It remained at number one in its second weekend, and fell to second in its third, behind Alien: Covenant. Vol. 2 remained at number two in its fourth weekend, this time behind Pirates of the Caribbean: Dead Men Tell No Tales, and crossed $337.6 million, surpassing the domestic gross of the first film. By its fifth weekend, the film fell to fourth, and in its next, fell to fifth. Vol. 2 continued to remain in the top 10 for two more weeks, placing ninth in its seventh weekend, and tenth in its eighth weekend.

Outside of the United States and Canada, the film earned $106 million in its first weekend from 37 markets, becoming the top film in them all except Portugal, Turkey, and Vietnam. IMAX contributed $5 million to the opening-weekend gross. The film also outperformed the original's opening weekend in all markets except Belgium. In its second weekend, the sequel opened as the top film in South Korea, China, and Russia. It had the highest opening for an MCU film in Austria, the second-highest in Australia ($11.8 million), the Netherlands ($500,000), Germany ($9.3 million), and the United Kingdom ($16.9 million), and the third-highest in New Zealand ($400,000), Italy ($1.4 million), and Russia ($11.6 million). The New Zealand and Netherlands openings were also the highest of 2017 for the countries, while Germany and the United Kingdom's were the second-highest. In South Korea, it had the biggest opening day ($3.3 million) and second-best opening weekend ($13.3 million) of 2017, the latter surpassing the original's entire earnings in the country. It also had the biggest May opening day and the third-highest opening day for an MCU film there. Ukraine had the second-largest opening ever, while in Puerto Rico, the film had the largest IMAX opening. More markets saw their gross for Vol. 2 surpass the total gross from the first film in its third weekend, with China following in its fourth. The next weekend saw Vol. 2's gross outside the United States and Canada ($451.1 million) surpass the international gross of the first film ($440 million). Vol. 2's three biggest markets in total earnings were: China ($99.3 million), the United Kingdom ($51.3 million), and Germany ($28 million).

=== Critical response ===
The review aggregator Rotten Tomatoes reported an approval rating of 85%, with an average score of 7.3/10, based on 422 reviews. The website's critical consensus reads, "Guardians of the Galaxy Vol. 2's action-packed plot, dazzling visuals, and irreverent humor add up to a sequel that's almost as fun—if not quite as thrillingly fresh—as its predecessor." On Metacritic, the film has a weighted average score of 67 out of 100, based on 47 critics, indicating "generally favorable" reviews. Audiences polled by CinemaScore gave the film an average grade of "A" on an A+ to F scale, while PostTrak reported filmgoers gave it a 93% overall positive score and a 77% "definite recommend".

Owen Gleiberman of Variety called the film "an extravagant and witty follow-up, made with the same friendly virtuosic dazzle... and just obligatory enough to be too much of a good thing." He cautioned that "this time you can sense just how hard [Gunn] is working to entertain you. Maybe a little too hard." Writing for Rolling Stone, Peter Travers described the film as a "blast" and gave it three stars out of four, praising the film for its tone and fun, soundtrack, and characters. He noted that "Vol. 2 can't match the sneak-attack surprise of its predecessor...[but] the followup, while taking on some CGI bloat and sequel slickness, hasn't lost its love for inspired lunacy. Chicago Sun-Times' Richard Roeper also gave the film three stars, calling it not "quite as much fun, not quite as clever, not quite as fresh as the original—but it still packs a bright and shiny and sweet punch." Roeper continued that "even with all the silliness and all the snarkiness, the Guardians can put a lump in your throat", and praised the cast, especially Rooker, with "one of the best roles in the movie". In his review for RogerEbert.com, Brian Tallerico gave the film three stars out of four, describing it as "a thoroughly enjoyable summer blockbuster" that does not take itself seriously, avoiding "many of the flaws of the first movie, and [doing] several things notably better. It's fun, clever and a great kick-off to the summer movie season."

At The Washington Post, Michael O'Sullivan gave the film four stars, praising it as being "funnier, nuttier, and more touching" than the first film. O'Sullivan felt it avoided usual sequel problems by building on the original film rather than repeating it, and also noted the use of music as well as "dazzling" visuals throughout, describing the film as "a toe-tapping, eye-popping indication that summer is here, and that it might not be so bad after all." Brian Lowry, writing for CNN.com, criticized the middle portion of the film and its villain, but felt the film fared better than other Marvel sequels with its strong beginning and end, and "good-natured energy", saying it "ultimately shares just enough with its central quintet—rather heroically getting the job done, even if the trip from here to there can be a bit disjointed and messy." For The Atlantic, Christopher Orr felt the film did not live up to the original, particularly due to its heavier themes and feeling that Russell was "badly miscast", but the rest of the cast, soundtrack, and humor were enough for him to give an overall positive review.

At The Hollywood Reporter, Todd McCarthy said "Guardians of the Galaxy Vol. 2 plays like a second ride on a roller-coaster that was a real kick the first time around but feels very been-there/done-that now." Kenneth Turan of the Los Angeles Times was positive of the film's soundtrack and cast, especially Russell, but felt Gunn was trying too hard to re-capture the magic of the first film, and the increased scope of effects and action becomes weary. Turan concluded, "There are enough reminders of the first Guardians to make the sequel an acceptable experience, [but it's] less like itself and more like a standard Marvel production." Manohla Dargis at The New York Times said the film "certainly has its attractions, but most of them are visual rather than narrative." She also felt Gunn was trying too hard, and found many elements of the sequel to be too serious even with Russell balancing that with a much-needed "unforced looseness". Anthony Lane in his review for The New Yorker felt once Ego was introduced, the film began to suffer from "the curse of the backstory" and that the "point that the movie, which has been motoring along nicely, fuelled by silliness and pep, begins to splutter" was when Ego's desire for larger meaning is revealed. Lane concluded, "Let's hope that Vol. 3 recaptures the fizz of the original, instead of slumping into the most expensive group-therapy session in the universe."

=== Accolades ===
Year	Award	Category	Recipient(s)	Result	Ref(s)
2017	Teen Choice Awards	Choice Sci-Fi Movie	Guardians of the Galaxy Vol. 2	Won	
2017	Teen Choice Awards	Choice Sci-Fi-Movie Actor	Chris Pratt	Won	
2017	Teen Choice Awards	Choice Sci-Fi-Movie Actress	Zoe Saldaña	Won	
2017	Teen Choice Awards	Choice MovieShip	Chris Pratt and Zoe Saldaña	Nominated	
2017	Teen Choice Awards	Choice Hissy Fit	Kurt Russell	Nominated	
2017	Teen Choice Awards	Choice Scene Stealer	Michael Rooker	Nominated	
2017	Dragon Awards	Best Science Fiction or Fantasy Movie	Guardians of the Galaxy Vol. 2	Nominated	
2017	Hollywood Film Awards	Sound Award	Dave Acord and Addison Teague	Won	
2017	Hollywood Music in Media Awards	Soundtrack Album	Guardians of the Galaxy Vol. 2	Nominated	
2017	Hollywood Music in Media Awards	Original Song – Sci-fi, Fantasy, Horror Film	"Guardian's Inferno" for The Sneepers & David Hasselhoff	Nominated	
2017	Hollywood Music in Media Awards	Outstanding Music Supervision – Film	Dave Jordan	Nominated	
2017	St. Louis Film Critics Association	Best Soundtrack	Guardians of the Galaxy Vol. 2	Nominated	
2017	Washington D.C. Area Film Critics Association Awards	Best Animated Voice Performance	Bradley Cooper	Nominated	
2017	Florida Film Critics Circle Awards	Best Visual Effects	Guardians of the Galaxy Vol. 2	Nominated	
2018	Annie Awards	Outstanding Achievement for Character Animation in a Live Action Production	Arslan Elver, Liam Russell, Alvise Avati, Alessandro Cuicci	Nominated	
2018	Grammy Awards	Best Compilation Soundtrack for Visual Media	Guardians of the Galaxy Vol. 2: Awesome Mix Vol. 2	Nominated	
2018	Guild of Music Supervisors Awards	Best Music Supervision for Film: Budgeted Over 25 Million Dollars	Dave Jordan	Nominated	
2018	Visual Effects Society Awards	Outstanding Visual Effects in a Photoreal Feature	Christopher Townsend, Damien Carr, Guy Williams, Jonathan Fawkner, Dan Sudick	Nominated	
2018	Visual Effects Society Awards	Outstanding Virtual Cinematography in a Photoreal Project	James Baker, Steven Lo, Alvise Avati, Robert Stipp for "Groot Dance/Opening Fight"	Won	
2018	Make-Up Artists and Hair Stylists Guild	Feature Motion Picture: Best Contemporary Hair Styling	Camille Friend, Louisa Anthony and Jules Holdren	Won	
2018	Make-Up Artists and Hair Stylists Guild	Feature Motion Picture: Best Special Makeup Effects	John Blake and Brian Sipe	Nominated	
2018	Black Reel Awards	Outstanding Voice Performance	Vin Diesel	Won	
2018	Academy Awards	Academy Award for Best Visual Effects	Christopher Townsend, Damien Carr, Guy Williams, Jonathan Fawkner, Dan Sudick	Nominated	
2018	Nickelodeon Kids' Choice Awards	Favorite Movie	Guardians of the Galaxy Vol. 2	Nominated	
2018	Nickelodeon Kids' Choice Awards	Favorite Movie Actor	Chris Pratt	Nominated	
2018	Nickelodeon Kids' Choice Awards	Favorite Movie Actress	Zoe Saldaña	Nominated	
2018	Billboard Music Awards	Top Soundtrack	Guardians of the Galaxy Vol. 2: Awesome Mix Vol. 2	Nominated	
2018	Saturn Awards	Best Comic-to-Motion Picture Release	Guardians of the Galaxy Vol. 2	Nominated	
2018	Saturn Awards	Best Supporting Actor in a Film	Michael Rooker	Nominated	
2018	Saturn Awards	Best Film Make-Up	John Blake, Brian Sipe	Nominated	
2018	Saturn Awards	Best Film Special / Visual Effects	Christopher Townsend, Guy Williams, Jonathan Fawkner, Dan Sudick	Won	

== Future ==
=== Sequel ===
Guardians of the Galaxy Vol. 3 was released on May 5, 2023, with Gunn returning to write and direct. Pratt, Saldaña, Bautista, Diesel, Cooper, Gillan, Klementieff, and Sean Gunn reprise their roles in the film, and are joined by Will Poulter as Adam Warlock.

=== I Am Groot ===
In December 2020, I Am Groot, a series of animated short films focused on Baby Groot, was announced for Disney+. Diesel reprises his role, with all five shorts released on August 10, 2022.

=== The Guardians of the Galaxy Holiday Special ===
The Guardians of the Galaxy Holiday Special is a Marvel Studios Special Presentation that was released on Disney+ on November 25, 2022, with Gunn writing and directing. Pratt, Bautista, Diesel, Cooper, Gillan, Klementieff, Rooker, and Sean Gunn reprise their roles in the special, which is set before the events of Vol. 3.

== See also ==
- "What If... the Watcher Broke His Oath?", an episode of the MCU television series What If...? that reimagines some events of this film
