= Gary Magness =

American businessman and film producer

Gary Magness is an American businessman and film producer.

Magness was born in Texas and grew up in Bozeman, Montana. His father was Bob Magness, the founder of Tele-Communications Inc. He attended the Western State College of Colorado, but dropped out.

Through his inheritance, he is a large stockholder in Tele-Communications Inc. He also chairs the Magness Investment Group, whose portfolio includes Magness Land & Cattle, Fortrust, a Denver-based state-of-the-art data center, and aquaculture breeding farms. In 2007, he founded Smokewood Entertainment with his wife, Sarah Siegel-Magness. He has produced three films and he is producing a fourth one. He has made charitable donations to the Food Bank of the Rockies, the University of Denver, and The Fresh Air Fund. He collects vintage cars.

He is married with three children, and they live in Denver, Colorado.

== Filmography as producer ==
- Tennessee (2008)
- Precious (2009)
- Judy Moody and the Not Bummer Summer (2011)
- Crazy Kind of Love (2013)
