= Mind Over Maddie =

- The logo
- Genre: Sitcom
- Created by: Peter Noble
- Written by: Joel Slack-Smith
- Directed by: Julie Money
- Starring: Jordana Beatty; Ellie Gall; Miles Gibson; Jessica Nash; Margie Cummings
- Country of origin: Australia
- Original language: English
- No. of seasons: 1
- No. of episodes: 20 (List of episodes)

Production
- Executive producers: Peter Noble; Louise Benham
- Editors: Alieia Gleeson; Leslie Marsh; Marlene Palmeiro
- Running time: 8 minutes

Original release
- Network: Disney Channel
- Release: 25 February – 22 March 2013

Mind Over Maddie is an Australian family television series that aired on Disney Channel Australia. The show first aired on 25 February 2013 and stars Jessica Nash as the titular Maddie. As of March 2013, eleven 8 minute episodes have aired. The show was nominated for a 2013 Astra Award for Most Outstanding Children’s Program or Event.

== Synopsis ==
Maddie (Jessica Nash) is an average 14-year-old girl trying to deal with her surroundings. Each day she faces different obstacles and all of her decisions are ultimately made by one of her three personality types: Optimism (Jordana Beatty), Ambition (Ellie Gall), or Doubt (Miles Gibson).

== Cast ==
- Jordana Beatty as Optimism
- Ellie Gall as Ambition
- Miles Gibson as Doubt
- Jessica Nash as Maddie (11 episodes, 2013)

== Episodes ==
No.	Title	Original release date	AUS viewers (millions)
1	"First Crush"	25 February 2013	41,000
2	"The School Dance"	26 February 2013	56,000
3	"The Text Message"	27 February 2013	47,000
4	"Speech Day"	28 February 2013	44,000
5	"Musical Auditions"	1 March 2013	43,000
6	"Vote For Maddie"	4 March 2013	50,000
7	"Cross Country"	5 March 2013	40,000
8	"Slumber Party"	6 March 2013	49,000
9	"Parent Teacher Night"	7 March 2013	47,000
10	"The Pimple"	8 March 2013	41,000
11	"Blank Canvas"	11 March 2013	46,000
12	"Cramming"	12 March 2013	40,000
13	"Brace Yourself"	13 March 2013	43,000
14	"Band Tryouts"	14 March 2013	45,000
15	"Short Story"	15 March 2013	42,000
16	"Scary Movie"	18 March 2013	51,000
17	"Birthday Party"	19 March 2013	45,000
18	"The New Girl"	20 March 2013	46,000
19	"Sick of Being Sick"	21 March 2013	48,000
20	"Valentine's Day"	22 March 2013	42,000

== Reception ==
=== Ratings ===
The series receives thousands of viewers each episode, making it one of the most watched series on Disney Channel.

=== Critical reception ===
Pam Brown of The West Australian says that it's a slick production by Julie Money and that "it's a clever way to tackle daily problems facing teens."

== See also ==
- Herman's Head, a similarly plotted American television show centering on an adult male protagonist
