= Judy Moody and the Not Bummer Summer =

- Theatrical release poster
- Directed by: John Schultz
- Written by: Megan McDonald; Kathy Waugh
- Based on: Judy Moody by Megan McDonald
- Produced by: Sarah Siegel-Magness; Gary Magness; Bobbi Sue Luther
- Starring: Heather Graham; Parris Mosteller; Preston Bailey; Garrett Ryan; Taylar Hender; Jaleel White; Jordana Beatty
- Cinematography: Shawn Maurer
- Edited by: John Pace III
- Music by: Richard Gibbs
- Production companies: Reel FX Animation Studios; Smokewood Entertainment
- Distributed by: Relativity Media (United States); Universal Pictures (International)
- Release date: June 10, 2011
- Running time: 92 minutes
- Country: United States
- Language: English
- Budget: $20 million
- Box office: $17 million

Judy Moody and the Not Bummer Summer is a 2011 American comedy film based on Megan McDonald's Judy Moody book series. Directed by John Schultz from a screenplay by McDonald and Kathy Waugh, it introduces Australian actress Jordana Beatty as the titular girl in a contest for the best summer with friends Amy Namey (Taylar Hender), who is off to Borneo; and Rockford "Rocky" Zang (Garrett Ryan), who is going to circus camp. Since her parents (Janet Varney and Kristoffer Winters) are off to California, Judy is stuck with her younger brother Stink (Parris Mosteller) and her free-spirited aunt Opal (Heather Graham). Her misadventures to have the best summer include a Bigfoot chase, various activities ruined by her friend Frank (Preston Bailey), and putting hats on animals with Opal.

Judy Moody and the Not Bummer Summer was the second project of couple and Smokewood Entertainment owners Sarah Siegel-Magness and Gary Magness, following the commercially and critically well-received film festival hit Precious (2009). The two bought the book rights on May 5, 2010, and Relativity Media bought the rights for domestic distribution on February 1, 2011. The adaptation's two-month shooting, which started in late August 2010; tracking of the score; and production of the animated sequences took place in and around Los Angeles, in order for Schultz to attend the birth of his child.

Beginning its domestic theatrical run on June 10, 2011, Judy Moody and the Not Bummer Summer was a box-office failure, grossing $17 million against a production budget of $20 million. However, despite the film receiving negative reviews from critics, the movie was praised for its casting and won a Young Artist Award for Best Young Ensemble Cast.

== Plot ==
Feisty girl Judy Moody sets out to have the most thrilling summer of her life. On the last day of the school year, Judy's teacher, Mr. Todd, announces that whichever student finds him over the summer gets a prize. Judy organizes a contest with her friends, who each have to do extraordinary things. If they each do them right, they earn “thrill points” and the best summer ever. Amy then announces that she is going to Borneo. Rocky announces he's going to circus camp, and Judy gets forced to spend the summer with her nerdy insecure friend Frank, much to her dismay. Judy attempts to convince her parents to let her go with Rocky to summer camp and then Amy to Borneo, but she fails. She emails her friends and tells them they can still have the contest but make it a race, and they agree, while also attempting to find Mr. Todd so they can get the prize. However, Frank unintentionally ruins all her plans by knocking her off a tightrope, inspired by a circus act Rocky did, vomiting all over her on a roller coaster called the Scream Monster at an amusement park, refusing to surf after a wave hits him at the beach, and leaving the movie theater in the middle of a scary movie marathon, and they fail to find Mr. Todd. After Judy's ideas go hilariously wrong, she decides to stay in her room for the rest of the summer.

Judy's parents then tell her that they have to travel to California to assist Judy's grandparents who are going through a difficult time, and their Aunt Opal will be staying with them while they're gone, whom Judy hasn't seen in years. Judy initially has a negative opinion about Opal, but once she reunites with her, she quickly bonds with her. Judy then learns that Opal is a bohemian “guerrilla artist” who “makes art out of everything and puts it everywhere.” They make their hats together and plan to put them on lion statues at the local library so everyone can see their artwork.

Meanwhile, she hears that Stink will be on the news because of his search for Bigfoot. Judy is interested in being a part of the story after hearing how famous Stink could be if he catches the creature, though the newscast ends as soon as Judy comes up.

Judy tries to pair up with Stink in the search for Bigfoot. One day, while Judy and Stink are out, they see Bigfoot walking down the street. They try to chase him, but he jumps inside an ice cream van. The two become Zeke's Bigfoot search club members and enter the van with them. They continue to chase after Bigfoot, but the news van hurries and jumps in front of them. Judy and the others drive around them and find them in the Fun Zone, an old amusement park. Bigfoot and the ice cream van driver (discovered to be Mr. Todd) get out of the van. They find out Bigfoot is Zeke in disguise and helping Mr. Todd sell ice cream. As a prize for finding Mr. Todd, Judy gets two front-row seat tickets for the circus. Judy ends up participating in a circus act with Rocky's family.

At the end of summer, Aunt Opal is about to leave, but before she leaves, she and Judy go put hats on lion statues, and she gets more thrill points. Judy says that Aunt Opal helped her get the most thrill points. Aunt Opal tells Judy that she plans to wrap the whole Eiffel Tower with 10,000 scarves next year and wants Judy to help her. Judy and Stink receive money for Stink's Bigfoot statue, which is being touched by the neighborhood.

== Cast ==
- Jordana Beatty as Judy Moody, a feisty pre-teen girl who decides to spend the rest of the summer in her bedroom.
- Parris Mosteller as James "Stink" Moody, Judy's mischievous 6-year-old brother who is obsessed with Bigfoot.
- Heather Graham as Aunt Opal Moody, an eccentric guerilla artist and Judy's estranged aunt who watches over Judy and Stink for the summer while their parents are away.
- Janet Varney as Mrs. Kate Moody
- Kristoffer Winters as Mr. Richard Moody
- Jaleel White as Mr. Todd
- Preston Bailey as Franklin "Frank" Pearl, Judy's nerdy second best friend who throughout the film hilariously unintentionally sabotages Judy's thrill stunts.
- Taylar Hender as Amy Namey
- Bobbi Sue Luther as Young Woman
- Hunter King as Priscilla Granger
- Ashley Boettcher as Jessica Finch
- Robert Costanzo as Mr. Birnbaum
- Sharon Sachs as Mrs. Birnbaum
- Garrett Ryan as Rockford "Rocky" Zang
- Jackson Odell as Zeke
- Cameron Boyce as Hunter
- Jenica Bergere as Rocky's Mom

== Production ==
=== Development ===
Couple Sarah Siegel-Magness and Gary Magness of Smokewood Entertainment, after finishing Precious (2009), planned their next project to be an adaptation of a Judy Moody novel after their daughter read one. The books made Sarah Siegel-Magness feel nostalgic, and she appreciated the titular character for being someone "any girl in America can aspire to. [...] She takes everyday scenarios and turns them into something magical." It took close to a year to purchase the rights, which were bought on May 5, 2010 following a meeting between the couple and Judy Moody author Megan McDonald, and the couple had plans to make a franchise out of the film. On February 1, 2011, Relativity Media, a distributor with thrillers and adult comedy films in most of its line-up, acquired rights to domestically distribute Judy Moody and the Not Bummer Summer.

As Siegel-Magness revealed her vision for Judy's actress, "I wanted a fresh face, someone who is not yet established, a young girl with a twinkle in her eye." Despite auditioning several actresses for the role of Judy, the studio failed to find a suitable one; a producer instructed Megan McDonald to look for one, and after some online research, the author found an image of Jordana Beatty: "I saw this wild, crazy red hair and this big smile and said, 'That's IT! It's her!'" McDonald had little expectations the producers would have her join; however, following a Skype audition, she was cast on July 21, 2010, for her "natural enthusiasm, humor and charismatic charm," reasoned Sarah Siegel-Magness.

Not counting a cancelled adaptation of Eloise in Paris (1957), Judy Moody and the Not Bummer Summer was Beatty's first lead role in a film. Beatty was a fan of all the Judy Moody books, reading them two times before she was cast. Being on set with other crew and actors who were American helped the Australian child actress develop an American accent for the character. McDonald was the most focused on Judy's actress not over-acting her mood swings: "If you exaggerate the moodiness just a little too much it can become kind of obnoxious. I was most worried that we'd get someone who would overplay the moods."

According to Jaleel White, "John Schultz told me to try to be part Richard Pryor and part Mister Rogers. I don't know what the heck that is even now, and I already completed the role."

Gayla Goehl served as Acting Coach during two weeks of preproduction with the young cast and for the entire filming on-set.

=== Set, filming, and music ===
The producers were committed to staying true to the novel's illustrations, down to the look of the cast members, and designs of costumes and sets.

All the production was done in and around Los Angeles, due to the discounts of local studios and in order for Schultz to accompany his wife going through childbirth. It was filmed in various locations in Southern California, such as a Studio City home, streets in Altadena and Glendora, beaches in Oxnard, San Rafael Elementary School, Ague Dulce for a tree sequence, the Warner Grand Theatre in San Pedro where Judy and Stink see a horror film while dressed up in zombie outfits, and Griffith Park. Reel FX Creative Studios' Santa Monica branch produced the during-film animations, while Exceptional Minds, a non-profit studio for autistic students, animated the end credits in what was their first major film project.

Filming took place for two months beginning late August 2010. The scene with the trickiest location to find was a creek in Judy's backyard; it took three days of searching, but the chosen location was the middle of a desert, with shrubs and trees added around the creek.

Glendora Village Pet Shop served as the pet store Fur & Fangs, while Glendora's Domenico's Jr. was the pizzeria Gino's. Goliath serves as the "Scream Monster" in the film. The UN Zone set was built on an empty San Pedro space next to a river, and the day of filming it was 113 degrees Fahrenheit, breaking the Los Angeles thermometer.

For the rollercoaster ride, Preston Bailey was fed a combination of yogurt, oatmeal, blueberries, and Rice Krispies cereal for the puke effect. It was Beatty's least favorite sequence: "I knew he was going to puke on me and I had to act like I didn't know [...] So then I had to act like I was mad at him for the rest of the roller coaster ride. And I said to Megan after the scene, 'I didn't have to act mad. Because I was mad!'"

The score of Judy Moody and the Not Bummer Summer was tracked in four days at the Newman Scoring Stage, located at the 20th Century Fox studio lot in Century City, Los Angeles. To have the score sound like comedy films such as Home Alone (1990) and Back to the Future (1985), Schultz decided to have the music performed by a total of 80 union members and musicians local to Los Angeles; this was unusual in a film industry becoming more reliant on sampled instruments, synthesizers, nonunion musicians, and tax credits to cut budgets, and recordings of scores taking place more often in London than in Los Angeles.

== Reception ==
=== Release and commercial performance ===
Since late April 2011, Judy Moody and the Not Bummer Summer was projected by Relativity and data analyst groups to gross within the range of $6–8 million in its opening weekend, and $23–25 million by the end of its run. The previous decade depicted poor box office numbers of book adaptations following female tween leads, such as Ella Enchanted (2004), Nancy Drew (2007), and Ramona and Beezus (2010). Ray Subers of Box Office Mojo predicted lame results with the Judy Moody film, citing the poor performance of Ramona and Beezus and movies based on non-fantasy books in general (excluding Diary of a Wimpy Kid). Ramona and Beezus was also used by The Numbers journalist C.S. Strowbridge for his predictions, as well as another Schultz-directed family film Aliens in the Attic (2009); feeling the Relativity-distributed feature would be a moderate hit at best, he forecasted Judy Moody's chances being harmed by its cast devoid of actors its demographic were familiar with.

It debuted on June 10, 2011, one of two major productions starting its theatrical run that weekend, the other being Super 8. Although it entered the top ten at number seven on its opening weekend, opening in 2,524 theaters, the numbers were weak, grossing $6,076,859. The opening weekend audience consisted of 52% being under 12, 36% being parents accompanying their kids, and 78% females. By the second weekend, although remaining in the top ten, it grossed 63% less than its first weekend, $2.2 million. Strowbridge diagnosed the film's second-week staying power as low for a children's flick, and suggested it may have been due to competition of the newly entered Mr. Popper's Penguins. Quickly, the amount of theaters showing the film decreased dramatically, going from 2,524 to 891 on June 24, and 891 to 221 on July 1. It grossed a total of $15,013,650 throughout its United States run; while the 132nd highest domestic-grossing film of 2011, it failed to make up its $20 million budget and, ranked The Hollywood Reporter, was the seventh-biggest box office bomb that summer.

Only days before its theatrical run began, the White House requested Judy Moody and the Not Bummer Summer for screening at the location.

Judy Moody and the Not Bummer Summer's DVD debuted at number nine on the format's charts with 60,000 units in its first week, while the Blu-ray debuted at number 23 on the Blu-ray charts with 8,000.

=== Critical response ===
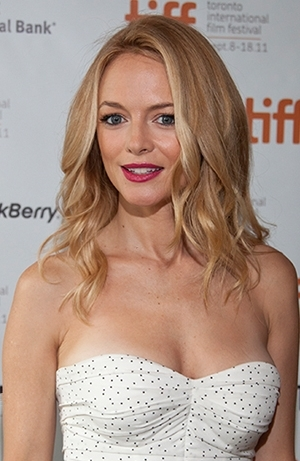
Although the film was critically panned, critics praised the performance of the cast, including Heather Graham.

Judy Moody and the Not Bummer Summer was poorly received by critics. On Rotten Tomatoes, it has an approval rating of 22% based on reviews from 79 critics, with an average rating of 4.3/10. The site's critical consensus reads: "Entertaining for some very young viewers, but for those with normal attention spans, Judy Moody is loud hyperactive overload." On Metacritic, it has a score of 37% based on reviews from 23 critics, indicating "generally unfavorable" reviews. Audiences polled by CinemaScore gave the film an average grade of B+, with 60% of those surveyed being under 18 and grading it A−, and those 25 or older grading it C+.

Generally, critics claimed that while children may enjoy the film, adults will be turned off by its loudness, overly-quick pace, lack of charm, and a disjointed story. Owen Gleiberman dismissed the product as "so airless [...] that there isn't a truly playful moment in it," while Kirk Honeycutt of The Hollywood Reporter summarized, "[Judy Moody and the Not Bummer Summer] wants to put on screen the sense of random play and concentrated games that fill a child's world for a few summers. In this it succeeds, but the film does not welcome others who might still retain memories of those NOT bummer summers." John Depko concluded in his review, "There's lots of action and bright colors. But we end up with a long, goofy chase looking for Bigfoot that is completely contrived." Brent Simon of Screen Daily called it inferior to films like Shorts (2009) and Matilda (1996), "exaggerated tales of adolescent adventure that this tiresome effort fitfully seems to want to emulate." One of the few critics who felt the film would appeal to all ages was Movies.com journalist Grae Drake, exclaiming that it had "lots of fun computer animation, snappy dialogue, and an occasional shot of Heather Graham running." Sandie Angulo Chen of Common Sense Media gave the film a rate two stars out of five, describing as a "popular book heroine gets a bummer adaptation."

Reviews frequently noted how the plot felt like a series of non-related skits instead of a single movie; and how its comedy wouldn't appeal to anyone over five years old, with particular criticism of its emphasis on bodily functions. Stephen Whitty of Inside Jersey criticized its focus on toilet humor over its story having a point or even a generic moral. There were also comments on how the source material was poorly adapted; Chen found the film's Judy "jealous and whiny" in comparison to the "young spitfire with a fantastic imagination" of the books, while the San Francisco Chronicle's Amy Biancolli called it "Hollywood-ized to the brink of lunacy" and lamented that it "fails to capture the books' childlike voice and charm." However, Peter Bradshaw admitted that while Judy Moody and the Not Bummer Summer may appeal only to kids, it was "oddly amiable some of the time, and better done than our recent British equivalent Horrid Henry." Philip French also found it one of the better mainstream children's flicks for its likable child and adult characters.

Whitty wrote the characters consisted of "two utterly idiotic and mostly off-screen parents, a smart-mouthed star who gets away with everything," "a supporting cast of junior weirdos who exist only to get roped into her schemes," and an aunt that looks "slightly insane, her eyes two huge blue pools of desperation. (If you saw this character in real life, you'd cross the street.)" The titular protagonist was widely condemned as a selfish brat and frequently connected to what reviewers perceived as an un-thrilling premise. Sight & Sound's Vadim Rizov categorized the trajectory as "a case of steadily diminishing returns on zero to begin with," citing Judy's constant need to have things go her way which Rizov considered to "lower the bar" of kid's media: "From the opening scenes of Judy petulantly freaking out about her parents' inability to pay for a summer vacation in Borneo, then retreating to sulk in her room for the rest of the season, it's hard to work up any empathy for her." Reasoned Nell Minow, "nothing she learns in the course of the film is about more than having fun and winning a pointless competition with your friends." The Boston Globe's Wesley Morris explained that she was so committed to having "quantifying and commodifying fun" during the summer, and that "Anything that deviates from Judy's wishes is a buzz kill and warrants a retaliatory tantrum." Chen noted the main problem with the conflict, citing Judy's attempts to have an exciting summer vacation not being exciting: "Judy's not battling an evil wizard, a menacing older brother or the school's social hierarchy. She's just trying to force herself to have a better summer than her friends." Complained Simon, "the movie even fails as a piece of wan, moralising entertainment, since it doesn't more firmly and lastingly establish Judy's anger at being 'left alone,' and then also violates the logic it instills in its protagonist by in the end having Judy arbitrarily award herself a victory."

The vivid, carnival-like presentation was positively highlighted by some journalists. Andy Webster of The New York Times described the film as "a celebration of messy, colorful, vigorous creativity, echoed in Cynthia Charette's gloriously cluttered hodgepodge production design, with barely a product placement in sight. [...] Imagery and movement — not gratuitous destruction — prevail." Suzette Valle labeled it "a Technicolor frolic of miss-matched outfits, unkempt hair and low-tech fun full of inspiring creativity which might encourage the plugged-in pre-teen set to come up with some unique old-fashioned summer fun of their own." Rizov called its transitions and techniques "reasonably ambitious" and well-done "for the usually technique-poor world of children's films," particularly spotlighting a transition incorporating comic book panels. On the other hand, others dismissed Schultz' directing as "unconvincing" and a "caricature," where "it's hard to know which is more disconcerting: the fact that the camera never stops moving, or that Graham's forehead barely moves at all," wrote Variety's Lael Loewenstein. Simon bashed the action scenes as "feebly captured and confusingly edited," comparing them to those of previous Schultz-directed films such as Aliens in the Attic. Whitty attributed the film's flashy style, as well as its self-centered lead, to the impact on family media caused by cable children's show, where instead of having the "approval of the parent who was accompanying you," it was "children who now made the entertainment choices."

Multiple critics enjoyed the performances, Beatty and Graham frequently highlighted. Depko found Beatty's portrayal of Judy "picture perfect" and "seems like a real kid and not a slick retread of a budding Hannah Montana"; while another film reviewer of the newspaper, Sheri Linden, felt Beatty brought "the right wacky willfulness to the part." Roger Moore of the Orlando Sentinel stated "Beatty has a winning way with various Judy-isms." Morris praised Mosteller's take on Stink, admiring him as "authentic and authentically manic" while at the same time not succumbing to "slanguage" and obnoxious traits of the kids around him. The Austin Chronicle claimed "Beatty's exuberance and uncombed mop of red hair are deliciously appealing" but disliked Graham's acting as "too anemic to be anything but a bubbly, post-porn Rollergirl gone artsy" instead of an aunt character. Simon more harshly critiqued the performances as over-acted and unsuitable with the "more naturalistic backdrop," considering it "ironic that had it been a bit more fanciful and outlandish in its construction, Judy Moody could have arguably met with more success in capturing the urgent, heightened stakes of prepubescent playtime."

== Awards ==
Award	Category	Recipients	Result	Ref.
Young Artist Award	Best Performance in a Feature Film - Leading Young Actress	Jordana Beatty	Nominated	
Young Artist Award	Best Performance in a Feature Film - Young Actor, Age Ten or Under	Preston Bailey	Nominated	
Young Artist Award	Best Performance in a Feature film - Young Ensemble Cast	Jordana Beatty, Preston Bailey, Parris Mosteller, Garrett Ryan, Ashley Boettcher, Taylar Hender, Cameron Boyce, Jackson Odell	Won	

== Home media ==
As Relativity Media has no home entertainment company, 20th Century Fox Home Entertainment acquired rights to release the film in home entertainment ports. 20th Century Fox Home Entertainment (which is now Relativity's home media partner) distributed the film on DVD and Blu-ray editions, which were released on October 11, 2011.

== Junior novelization ==
The junior novel-tie in book was released on May 24, 2011. This was also the 10th book of the Judy Moody series, written by Megan McDonald and illustrated by Peter H. Reynolds.
