= Worst Week =

American sitcom television series

- Genre: Sitcom
- Based on: The Worst Week of My Life by Mark Bussell & Justin Sbresni
- Developed by: Matt Tarses
- Starring: Kyle Bornheimer; Erinn Hayes; Nancy Lenehan; Kurtwood Smith
- Composer: David Schwartz
- Country of origin: United States
- Original language: English
- No. of seasons: 1
- No. of episodes: 16

Production
- Executive producers: Matt Tarses; Jimmy Mulville; Adam Bernstein
- Producer: Matthew Nodella
- Camera setup: Single-camera
- Running time: 30 minutes
- Production companies: Two Soups Productions; Hat Trick Productions; CBS Paramount Television; Universal Media Studios

Original release
- Network: CBS
- Release: September 22, 2008 – June 6, 2009

Related
- The Worst Week of My Life

Worst Week is an American sitcom television series that premiered on CBS on September 22, 2008. The series was based on the British sitcom The Worst Week of My Life. It was adapted for American audiences by Fox under the title Worst Week of My Life, but a series didn't materialize after the pilot was filmed.

The series aired on CBS Mondays at 9:30pm ET/PT, following Two and a Half Men. The premiere attracted 11 million viewers but lost a third of its lead-in audience. Ratings dropped to a low of 8.4 million viewers with the sixth episode, but then began to climb steadily, reaching a high of 12.12 million viewers with the eleventh episode before declining again.

On May 20, 2009, CBS cancelled the series after one season and the series finale aired on June 6, 2009.

== Cast ==
=== Main characters ===
- Kyle Bornheimer as Samuel "Sam" Briggs
- Erinn Hayes as Melanie "Mel" Clayton-Briggs
- Nancy Lenehan as Angela Clayton
- Kurtwood Smith as Richard "Dick" Clayton

=== Recurring characters ===
- Nick Kroll as Adam
- Jessica St. Clair as Sarah
- Ken Jeong as Phil
- Parris Mosteller as Scotty
- Brooke Nevin as Chloe Clayton
- RonReaco Lee as David Clayton
- Hayes McArthur as Chad
- Fred Willard as Paul Briggs
- Olympia Dukakis as June Clayton
- Philip Baker Hall as Reverend Lowell

== Episodes ==
| No. | Title | Directed by | Written by | Original release date | Prod. code | U.S. viewers (millions) |
|---|---|---|---|---|---|---|
| 1 | "Pilot" | Adam Bernstein | Teleplay by : Matt Tarses | September 22, 2008 | 101 | 11.04 |
In the series premiere, Sam and Mel intend to reveal her pregnancy to her parents after a quiet dinner. However, when Sam misses the train after having a drunk girl throw up on him, the dinner starts becoming increasingly unlikely.
| 2 | "The Bird" | Adam Bernstein | Matt Tarses | September 29, 2008 | 102 | 9.31 |
Sam tries a different method of winning Dick's approval: impressing his wife, Angela. However, Sam's well thought out plan backfires, when Dick's prize birds get involved.
| 3 | "The Monitor" | Chris Koch | Gail Lerner | October 6, 2008 | 103 | 8.79 |
Sam's friend Adam visits the Claytons's house, and immediately falls for Mel's sister.
| 4 | "The Truck" | Adam Bernstein | Gregg Mettler | October 13, 2008 | 104 | 9.78 |
Sam and Mel continue to keep their upcoming nuptials secret, however it explodes and more in front of the entire Clayton family.
| 5 | "The Club" | Michael Fresco | Luvh Rakhe | October 20, 2008 | 106 | 9.90 |
After inviting too many co-workers to the wedding, Sam tells a risky lie that takes on a life of its own.
| 6 | "The Ring" | Michael Spiller | Gregg Mettler | November 3, 2008 | 107 | 8.40 |
Melanie and Sam are handed down the family wedding ring for use in their marriage, however disaster strikes when Sam loses it.
| 7 | "The Vows" | Rob Greenberg | Lon Zimmet & Dan Rubin | November 10, 2008 | 108 | 9.62 |
Sam winds up in hot water, literally, trying to impress the Clayton family minister.
| 8 | "The Cake" | Eyal Gordin | Sam Laybourne | November 17, 2008 | 109 | 10.37 |
The in-laws finally meet up, as Sam's parents meet Mel's folks for the first time.
| 9 | "The Wedding" | Michael Lehmann | Gail Lerner | November 24, 2008 | 110 | 10.35 |
Sam has to resolve an argument between Mel and Angela.
| 10 | "The Apartment" | Fred Savage | Lon Zimmet & Dan Rubin | December 8, 2008 | 111 | 10.60 |
When Angela decides she wants to rent the apartment upstairs from Sam and Mel to be closer once the baby comes, Mel tries to prove that she doesn't need her help.
| 11 | "The Gift" | Adam Bernstein | Allison Brown | December 15, 2008 | 112 | 12.12 |
When Sam learns that Dick gives Angela the same Christmas gift every year, he decides to help Dick find the perfect present.
| 12 | "The Article" | Phil Traill | Neil Goldman & Garrett Donovan | January 12, 2009 | 113 | 10.45 |
When Sam tries to clear his mind from the experience of accidentally walking in on Angela at the gynecologist's office, he writes down his private thoughts - which accidentally wind up in the wrong hands.
| 13 | "The Puppy" | Michael Spiller | Gail Lerner | January 19, 2009 | 114 | 9.58 |
When Sam sees a litter of puppies being born, he worries he might not be able to handle the birth of his own child.
| 14 | "The Sex" | Michael Lehmann | Gregg Mettler | February 2, 2009 | 115 | 10.04 |
When Sam and Mel babysit their nephew, he captures a photograph of them in a compromising position that he plans to bring to school for a family photo exhibition.
| 15 | "The Epidural" | Michael Spiller | Luvh Rakhe | February 16, 2009 | 116 | 8.70 |
When Mel calls Sam to let him know she is in labor, he misunderstands the name of the hospital and winds up at the wrong one.
| 16 | "The Party" | John Fortenberry | Sam Laybourne | June 6, 2009 | 105 | 1.91 |
When Sam gives it his all to help the Claytons prepare for Dick's birthday party, he loses his pants and some dignity in his effort to make everything perfect. (This episode was aired out of order; its events pick up directly from the end of episode 4, "The Truck.")

== Critical reception ==
Verne Gay of Newsday graded it A and said it "may be the best new comedy on network TV this season." Less enthusiastic was Tim Goodman of the San Francisco Chronicle, who said, "Though there are plenty of hard-earned (some might say forced) laughs here and Bornheimer is a real find, you can't help but wonder how they'll keep up the pace. After all, the British series ran for only two seasons and had a mere seven episodes each season...So how is CBS going to stretch this into 22 episodes without stretching it too thin?...In many ways, Worst Week seems incapable of being made into an American version (there were previous attempts that failed), because not only does the title not make sense, but not having a payoff for all the freaky, not-so-karmic woes Sam endures will be frustrating to the viewing audience . . . [It] is a series that may end up being on a short leash."

Linda Stasi of the New York Post called it "one of the worst new shows of the week" and added, "Only a man (or a couple of them) could get paid big bucks in Hollywood to come up with such a lame-o rip-off and perpetuate the fantasy that gorgeous women can't help but to love out-of-shape guys who do everything wrong."

== Home media ==
Universal Studios Home Entertainment has released a DVD of the complete series.
