= Judy Moody =

Children's book series by Megan McDonald

- Author: Megan McDonald
- Country: United States
- Language: English
- Genre: Children's literature
- Publisher: Candlewick Press
- Published: 2000–present
- Media type: Print
- Website: judymoody.com

Judy Moody is a series of children's books by Megan McDonald. The series began with the publication of Judy Moody in 2000 by Candlewick Press. A spin-off Stink series follows the main character's younger brother. Together, the books have sold 34 million copies as of 2017, and have been translated into at least 22 languages. The tenth Judy Moody book inspired a 2011 film by the same name, Judy Moody and the Not Bummer Summer. Both the Judy Moody and Stink series are illustrated by Peter H. Reynolds, a former animator whose career as a children's illustrator began with the first Judy Moody.

The character of Judy Moody has been compared to the Ramona Quimby character introduced in 1950, and the author Megan McDonald has been compared to its creator Beverly Cleary (1916–2021). The Judy Moody series has been praised for its depictions of the complex social and emotional lives of tweens.

== Characters ==
The Judy Moody series follows the humorous adventures of eight-year-old Judy Moody, a tomboy who likes mismatched clothing and uses catchphrases such as ROAR! and rare!. She has a younger brother called Stink and aspires to someday become a doctor. Judy Moody lives in Virginia. The character was inspired in part by Megan McDonald's own experience as a "moody" child. Judy Moody, like McDonald, has unusual and wide-ranging collections. McDonald grew up the youngest of five girls and thought it would be fun to write about an oldest child. McDonald has said that she writes the Judy Moody character carefully, saying "I really want her to be feisty but not a brat". The first book opens: "Judy Moody did not want to give up summer. She did not want to brush her hair every day. She did not feel like memorizing spelling words. And she did not want to sit next to Frank Pearl, who ate paste, in class. Judy Moody was in a mood".

Among the characters are Judy Moody, Stink Moody, Rocky Zang, Frank Pearl, Jessica Finch, Amy Namey, Alisson Monday, Mr. Todd, Jalisco, Tody, Chloe, and Tori. A spin-off series follows Judy's younger brother, nicknamed Stink.

== Reception ==
Particular books in the series have won various awards, such as "Best Book of the Year" from Publishers Weekly, the International Reading Association Children's Choice award, and the inaugural Beverly Cleary Children's Choice Award.

The Judy Moody series, which began in 2000, belongs to a sturdy genre of early chapter books: the everyday capers of a school-age child. This is a form Ms. Cleary perfected in her Ramona books, and it has been updated continuously to feed new generations of readers' appetites for stories about girls like them.
The protagonists in these books tend to be good-hearted but not goody-goody, smart but not insufferable, eager to please but not always able to do so. They have conflicting emotions that they themselves do not always understand. Most important, they achieve the golden trifecta for tween heroines. Readers can relate to, aspire to be and occasionally feel superior to them — all at the same time. – Meg Wolitzer in The New York Times, 2011

In 2005, Sebastopol, California, the city where McDonald lives, declared June 14 to be Judy Moody Day.

== Books ==
McDonald gained inspiration from many places, such as when her niece surprised her by winning a stuffed animal in a claw machine three times in a row, which became the inspiration for Judy Moody and the Bad Luck Charm.

=== Judy Moody books ===
1. Judy Moody (originally published as Judy Moody Was in a Mood. Not a Good Mood, a Bad Mood) (Candlewick Press, 2000)
2. Judy Moody Gets Famous! (Candlewick Press, 2001)
3. Judy Moody Saves the World! (Candlewick Press, 2002)
4. Judy Moody Predicts the Future (Candlewick Press, 2003)
5. Judy Moody, M.D. The Doctor Is In (published in the UK as Doctor Judy Moody) (Candlewick Press, 2004)
6. Judy Moody Declares Independence (Candlewick Press, 2005)
7. Judy Moody: Around the World in 8½ Days (Candlewick Press, 2006)
8. Judy Moody Goes to College (Candlewick Press, 2008)
9. Judy Moody: Girl Detective (Candlewick Press, 2010)
10. Judy Moody and the Not Bummer Summer (Candlewick Press, 2011)
11. Judy Moody and the Bad Luck Charm (Candlewick Press, 2012)
12. Judy Moody: Mood Martian (Candlewick Press, 2014)
13. Judy Moody and the Bucket List (Candlewick Press, 2016)
14. Judy Moody and the Royal Tea Party (Candlewick Press, 2017)
15. Judy Moody Book Quiz Whiz (Candlewick Press, 2018)
16. Judy Moody: In a Monday Mood (Candlewick Press, 2021)

=== Judy Moody and Stink books ===
1. Judy Moody & Stink: The Holly Joliday (Candlewick Press, 2008)
2. Judy Moody & Stink: The Mad, Mad, Mad, Mad Treasure Hunt (Candlewick Press, 2009)
3. Judy Moody & Stink: The Big Bad Blackout (Candlewick Press, 2014)
4. Judy Moody & Stink: The Wishbone Wish (Candlewick Press, 2015)

=== Stink books ===
1. Stink: The Incredible Shrinking Kid (Candlewick Press, 2005)
2. Stink: and the Incredible Super-Galactic Jawbreaker (Candlewick Press, 2006)
3. Stink: and the World's Worst Super-Stinky Sneakers (Candlewick Press, 2007)
4. Stink: and the Great Guinea Pig Express (Candlewick Press, 2008)
5. Stink: Solar System Superhero (Candlewick Press, 2009)
6. Stink: and the Ultimate Thumb-Wrestling Smackdown (Candlewick Press, 2011)
7. Stink: and the Midnight Zombie Walk (Candlewick Press, 2012)
8. Stink: and the Freaky Frog Freakout (Candlewick Press, 2013)
9. Stink: and the Shark Sleepover (Candlewick Press, 2014)
10. Stink: and the Attack of the Slime Mold (Candlewick Press, 2016)
11. Stink: Hamlet and Cheese (Candlewick Press, 2018)
12. Stink: and the Hairy Scary Spider (Candlewick Press, 2020)
13. Stink: Superhero Superfan (Candlewick Press, 2023)
14. Stink: and the Big Bad Badgers (Candlewick Press, 2025)
15. Stink Moody in Master of Disaster (Candlewick Press)

=== Judy Moody and Friends books ===
1. Frank Pearl in The Awful Waffle Kerfuffle (Candlewick Press)
2. Amy Namey in Ace Reporter (Candlewick Press)
3. Rocky Zang in The Amazing Mr. Magic (Candlewick Press)
4. Jessica Finch in Pig Trouble (Candlewick Press)
5. One, Two, Three, ROAR! (Candlewick Press)
6. Triple Pet Trouble (Candlewick Press)
7. Mrs. Moody in The Birthday Jinx (Candlewick Press)
8. April Fools’, Mr. Todd! (Candlewick Press)
9. Judy Moody, Tooth Fairy (Candlewick Press)
