= Preston Bailey =

American actor (born 2000)

- Born: July 25, 2000 (age 26); Portland, Oregon, U.S.
- Occupation: Actor
- Years active: 2002–present

Preston Bailey (born July 25, 2000) is an American actor who started acting at the age of two. He is known for appearing in the Showtime television series Dexter and for starring in such films as Judy Moody and the Not Bummer Summer, Children of the Corn, and The Crazies.

== Early life ==
Bailey was born in Portland, Oregon. He is the younger brother of Brennan Bailey, also an actor. He moved to California at the age of five.

== Career ==
Bailey started acting in commercials at the age of two. Some national television commercials starring Bailey include Priceline.com, Clorox, Stouffer's, Juicy Juice, BMW, Bissell, and Mucinex. He guest-starred, in his first acting role, on Strong Medicine in 2005 as Dougie Nauls. He also appeared in television shows including Criminal Minds, How I Met Your Mother and Numb3rs.

In 2007, he joined the cast of Showtime/CBS serial-killer drama Dexter in a recurring role as Rita Morgan's son Cody Bennett. He took over from Daniel Goldman from season one, playing the character in seasons two, three, four and five, as well as one guest appearance in season seven. He appeared in a total of 34 episodes.

He has also appeared in several films. Bailey was cast as Timmy Armstrong in the feature film Nothing But the Truth. He co-starred in New Line Cinemas feature film Amusement, which was filmed in Budapest, Hungary. He was also seen in the National Geographic / Paramount feature Arctic Tale. Bailey was also cast to play the lead role of boy preacher Isaac Chroner in the television remake of Children of the Corn. In 2010, he appeared in an episode of Cold Case and also in The Crazies as Nicholas Farnum.

== Filmography ==
=== Film ===
Year	Title	Role	Notes
2007	Arctic Tale	Kid	
2008	Seven Years	Brennan	Short film
2008	Nothing But the Truth	Timmy Armstrong	
2009	Kay	Connor	Short film
2009	Amusement	Max	
2009	Children of the Corn	Isaac Chroner	
2010	The Crazies	Nicholas Farnum	
2010	Eagleheart	Miracle boy	
2010	Cold Case	Tim Malone	
2010	Adalyn	Preston	Short film
2011	Judy Moody and the Not Bummer Summer	Frank Pearl	
2011	The Apologist	Augie	
2014	In Your Eyes	Clay	
2014	A Million Ways to Die in the West	12-year-old Albert	
2014	By God's Grace	Jacob	
2017	Across My Land	Alex	Short film
2018	Pretty Broken	Monty Lou	

=== Television ===
Year	Title	Role	Notes
2005	Strong Medicine	Dougie Nauls	1 episode
2006	Criminal Minds	Eric	1 episode
2007–2010; 2012	Dexter	Cody Bennett	Recurring (seasons 2–5); guest (season 7)
2007	How I Met Your Mother	Kindergartner	1 episode
2007	Numbers	Randy Amato	Episode: The Art of Reckoning
2009	It's Always Sunny In Philadelphia	Young Mac	Episode: A Very Sunny Christmas
2010	Glenn Martin, DDS	Young Glenn	Episode: Camp
2010	Funny or Die Presents	Schoolboy	

== Awards and nominations ==
Year	Award	Category	Work	Result	Ref.
2009	Screen Actors Guild Award	Outstanding Performance by an Ensemble in a Drama Series	Dexter	Nominated	
2009	Young Artist Awards	Best Performance in a TV Series – Recurring Young Actor	Dexter	Nominated	
2010	Screen Actors Guild Award	Outstanding Performance by an Ensemble in a Drama Series	Dexter	Nominated	
2010	Young Artist Awards	Best Performance in a TV Series – Recurring Young Actor 13 and Under	Dexter	Nominated	
2011	Young Artist Awards	Best Performance in a Feature Film – Supporting Young Actor Ten and Under	The Crazies	Nominated	
2011	Young Artist Awards	Best Performance in a TV Series – Guest Starring Young Actor Ten and Under	Cold Case	Nominated	
2011	Young Artist Awards	Best Performance in a TV Series – Recurring Young Actor Ten and Under	Dexter	Nominated	
2012	Young Artist Awards	Best Performance in a Feature Film – Young Actor Ten and Under	Judy Moody and the Not Bummer Summer	Nominated	
2012	Young Artist Awards	Best Performance in a Feature Film – Young Ensemble Cast	Judy Moody and the Not Bummer Summer	Won	
