= Parris Mosteller =

American teen actor (born 2001)

- Born: Parris Henry Mosteller; July 5, 2001 (age 25); Torrance, California , United States
- Occupation: Actor
- Years active: 2005–present
- Height: 5 ft 8 in (173 cm)

Parris Hank Mosteller (born July 5, 2001) is an American teen actor who is best known for playing his supporting role of James “Stink” Moody in Judy Moody and the Not Bummer Summer which won the Young Artist Award Best Performance in a Feature film - Young Ensemble Cast.

== Life and career ==
Mosteller was born in New York City, NY. Mother is Brandy R Panitz Ruth. He has an older sister named Rose Josie Mosteller (born July 10, 1996). Rose Mosteller is also an actress. He has another older sister named Maisey Hattie Mosteller (born July 14, 1996) He has one more older sister named Josie McKenna Mosteller (born July 1, 1996) He spent most of his early life and childhood in Scotland and then moved to Colorado. He started acting at the age of 4.

In 2011, he started filming for Judy Moody and the Not Bummer Summer. He played the role of Stink.

== Filmography ==
=== Film ===
Parris Mosteller' film credits
Year	Title	Role	Notes
2007	Into the Wild	Young Boy (voice)	Uncredited
2011	Judy Moody and the Not Bummer Summer	James “Stink” Moody	
2024	Joker: Folie à Deux		Loop group

=== Television ===
Parris Mosteller' television credits
Year	Title	Role	Notes
2008–2009	Worst Week	Scotty	6 episodes
2013	Mob City	Young Hershel	Episode: "Reason to Kill a Man"
2014	About a Boy	Butcher	Episode: "About a Slopmaster"
2017	School of Rock	Dylan	Episode: "The Other Side of Summer"
