= 32nd Young Artist Awards =

2011 US media awards ceremony

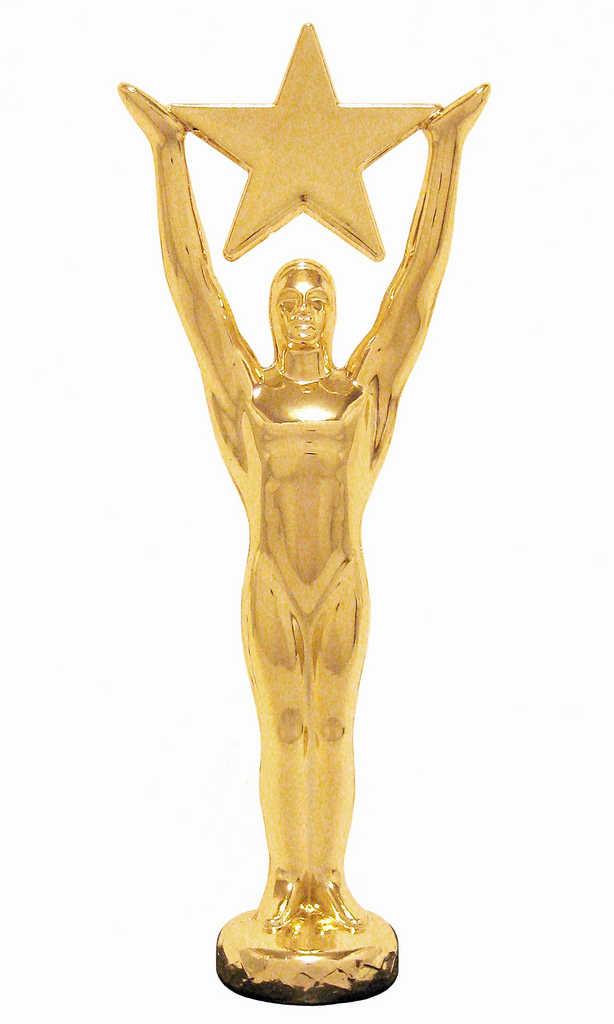
- Awarded for: Achievement in 2010 in film and television
- Date: March 13, 2011
- Site: Sportsmen's Lodge; Studio City, Los Angeles, California
- Hosted by: Hailee Steinfeld and Jaden Smith

The 32nd Young Artist Awards ceremony, presented by the Young Artist Association, honored excellence of young performers between the ages of 5 and 21 in the fields of film, television, theater and music for the year 2010, and took place on March 13, 2011, at the Sportsmen's Lodge in Studio City, Los Angeles, California.

Established in 1978 by long-standing Hollywood Foreign Press Association member, Maureen Dragone, the Young Artist Association was the first organization to establish an awards ceremony specifically set to recognize and award the contributions of performers under the age of 21 in the fields of film, television, theater and music.

== Categories ==
★ Bold indicates the winner in each category.

== Best Performance in a Feature Film ==
=== Best Performance in a Feature Film - Leading Young Actor ===
★ Jaden Smith - The Karate Kid - Columbia Pictures

- Noah Ringer - The Last Airbender - Paramount Pictures
- Zachary Gordon - Diary of a Wimpy Kid - 20th Century Fox
- Eros Vlahos - Nanny McPhee and the Big Bang - Universal Pictures
- Aaron Taylor-Johnson - Kick-Ass - Lionsgate

=== Best Performance in a Feature Film - Leading Young Actress ===
★ Hailee Steinfeld - True Grit - Paramount Pictures

- Chloë Grace Moretz - Kick-Ass - Universal Pictures
- Delanie Armstrong - Lavanderia - Stauros Entertainment
- Jennifer Lawrence - Winter's Bone - Roadside Attractions
- Elle Fanning - The Nutcracker in 3D - Free Style Releasing

=== Best Performance in a Feature Film - Leading Young Actress Ten and Under ===
★ Joey King - Ramona and Beezus - 20th Century Fox

- Bailee Madison - An Invisible Sign - Kimmel International
- Kiernan Shipka - Cats & Dogs: The Revenge of Kitty Galore - Warner Brothers

=== Best Performance in a Feature Film - Supporting Young Actor ===
★ Billy Unger - You Again - Touchstone Pictures

- Robert Capron - Diary of a Wimpy Kid - Twentieth Century Fox
- Alexander Conti - Case 39 - Paramount Vantage
- Chase Ellison - Tooth Fairy - Twentieth Century Fox
- Alex Ferris - Diary of a Wimpy Kid - Twentieth Century Fox
- Quinton Lopez - Dark House - Lightning Media II
- Dylan Minnette - Let Me In - Relativity Media
- Frankie McLaren - Hereafter - Warner Bros. Pictures
- George McLaren - Hereafter - Warner Bros. Pictures

=== Best Performance in a Feature Film - Supporting Young Actress ===
★ (tie) Diandra Newlin - Dreamkiller - Delaware Pictures
★ (tie) Stefanie Scott - Flipped - Warner Bros. Pictures

- Seychelle Gabriel - The Last Airbender - Paramount Pictures
- Courtney Robinson - Dark House - Lightning Media II
- Laine MacNeil - Diary of a Wimpy Kid - Twentieth Century Fox
- Ada-Nicole Sanger - Grown Ups - Columbia Pictures

=== Best Performance in a Feature Film - Supporting Young Actor Ten and Under ===
★ Colin Baiocchi - Little Fockers - Universal Pictures

- Chandler Canterbury - After.Life - Anchor Bay Films
- Preston Bailey - The Crazies - Overture Films
- Michael William Arnold - My Name is Khan - Twentieth Century Fox
- Ryan Ketzner - Flipped - Warner Bros. Pictures

=== Best Performance in a Feature Film - Supporting Young Actress Ten and Under ===
★ Melody Choi - Gunless - Alliance Films

- Faith Wladyka - Blue Valentine - The Weinstein Company
- Simone Lopez - Mother and Child - Sony Pictures Classic
- Destiny Whitlock - Tooth Fairy - Twentieth Century Fox

=== Best Performance in a Feature Film - Young Ensemble Cast ===
★ Diary of a Wimpy Kid - Twentieth Century Fox Film Corporation

Zachary Gordon, Robert Capron, Devon Bostick, Alex Ferris, Karan Brar, Chloë Grace Moretz, Laine MacNeil and Grayson Russell

- The Chronicles of Narnia: The Voyage of the Dawn Treader - Twentieth Century Fox Film Corporation

Georgie Henley, Skander Keynes and Will Poulter

- Let Me In - Overture Films

Kodi Smit-McPhee, Chloë Grace Moretz, Dylan Minnette and Jimmy "Jax" Pinchak

== Best Performance in an International Feature Film ==
=== Best Performance in an International Feature Film - Leading Young Performer ===
★ (tie) Robert Naylor - 10½ - Canada (French)
★ (tie) Teymur Odushev - The Precinct - Azerbaijan

- Denis Sukhomlinov - The Rowan Waltz - Russia
- Leo Legrand - A Distant Neighborhood - France
- Bill Skarsgård - Simple Simon - Sweden
- Roger Príncep - Paper Birds - Spain
- Keitumetse Matlabo - Tirza - The Netherlands
- Felipe Falanga - Lula, The Son of Brasil - Brazil

== Best Performance in a Short Film ==
=== Best Performance in a Short Film - Young Actor ===
★ Andy Scott Harris - Alone - Independent

- Tyler Shamy - World of Lines - Mighty 8
- Justin Tinucci - Stanley - Independent
- Brennan Bailey - Adalyn - Independent
- LJ Benet - The Legend of Beaver Dam - Independent
- Brandon Tyler Russell - Wurm - Independent
- Joey Luthman - Mad Dog and the Flyboy - Independent
- Austin Coleman - Tent City - ITVS

=== Best Performance in a Short Film - Young Actress ===
★ Katlin Mastandrea - Make Believer - Independent

- Rylie Beaty - Adalyn - Independent
- Christina Robinson - Equestrian Sexual Response - American Film Institute
- Sydney Sweeney - Takeo - American Film Institute

=== Best Performance in a Short Film - Young Actor Ten and Under ===
★ Dawson Dunbar - Little Big Kid - Independent

- Kyle Agnew - Suburban Superhero - Independent
- Kai Kennedy - Birth Day - Independent
- Matthew Jacob Wayne - Wurm - Independent

=== Best Performance in a Short Film - Young Actress Ten and Under ===
★ Kaitlin Cheung - The Perfect Gift for Flora - Independent

- Chelsey Valentine - Birthday - Independent
- Dalila Bela - Kids Court - Independent
- Maggie Jones - The Party - Independent
- Caitlin Carmichael - The Mis-Informant - Independent
- Melody Choi - Kids Court - Independent
- Ashley Switzer - One For You And One For Me - Independent
- Ashley Nicole Greene - To Wander in Pandemonium - yFury Flix

== Best Performance in a TV Movie, Miniseries or Special ==
=== Best Performance in a TV Movie, Miniseries or Special - Leading Young Actor ===
★ Brennan Bailey - The Dog Who Saved Christmas Vacation - Stars Home Entertainment

- Chase Ellison - The Boy Who Cried Werewolf - Nickelodeon Network
- Michael Arnold - The Dog Who Saved Christmas Vacation - Stars Home Entertainment
- John Fleming - Cancel Christmas - The Hallmark Channel
- Gage Munroe - The Night Before the Night Before Christmas - The Hallmark Channel

=== Best Performance in a TV Movie, Miniseries or Special - Leading Young Actress ===
★ Mia Ford - Within - Bigfoot Entertainment

- Victoria Justice - The Boy Who Cried Werewolf - Nickelodeon
- Debby Ryan - 16 Wishes - The Disney Channel
- Madisen Beaty - The Pregnancy Pact - The Lifetime Channel
- Morgan Lily - Love's Everlasting Courage - The Hallmark Channel

=== Best Performance in a TV Movie, Miniseries or Special - Supporting Young Actor ===
★ Cainan Wiebe - 16 Wishes - The Disney Channel

- Alexander Conti - Harriet the Spy: Blog Wars - The Disney Channel
- Max Ehrich - The Pregnancy Pact - Lifetime Television
- Tate Berney - Farewell Mr. Kringle - RHI Entertainment
- Joey Pollari - Avalon High - The Disney Channel
- Ty Wood - Keep Your Head Up, Kid: The Don Cherry Story - CBS Television

=== Best Performance in a TV Movie, Miniseries or Special - Supporting Young Actress ===
★ Olivia Steele-Falconer - The Client List - Lifetime Television

- Chloe Madison - Amish Grace - Lifetime Movie Network
- Lauren Delfs - Las Tundas of the Valley - Web Series
- Kelly Heyer - The Pregnancy Pact - Lifetime Television
- Brianna Daguanno - The Santa Suit - The Hallmark Channel

== Best Performance in a TV Series ==
=== Best Performance in a TV Series (Comedy or Drama) - Leading Young Actor ===
★ Benjamin Stockham - Sons of Tucson - Twentieth Century Fox TV

- Jesse Camacho - Less Than Kind - Break Through Ent.
- Jacob Kraemer - Overruled! - The Disney Channel
- Dylan Everett - Wingin' It - The Family Channel
- Jason Spevack - Dino Dan - Nickelodeon Productions
- Daniel Curtis Lee - Zeke and Luther - Disney XD

=== Best Performance in a TV Series (Comedy or Drama) - Leading Young Actress ===
★ Bella Thorne - Shake It Up - The Disney Channel

- Ryan Newman - Zeke and Luther - Disney XD
- Miranda Cosgrove - iCarly - Nickelodeon
- Keke Palmer - True Jackson, VP - Nickelodeon

=== Best Performance in a TV Series (Comedy or Drama) - Supporting Young Actor ===
★ Coy Stewart - Are We There Yet? - TBS

- Braeden Lemasters - Men of a Certain Age - TNT
- Graham Phillips - The Good Wife - CBS
- Bradley Steven Perry - Good Luck Charlie - Disney Channel

=== Best Performance in a TV Series (Comedy or Drama) - Supporting Young Actress ===
★ Teala Dunn - Are We There Yet? - TBS

- Brittany Curran - Men of a Certain Age - TNT
- Hannah Hodson - Hawthorne - TNT
- Kiernan Shipka - Mad Men - AMC
- Kathryn Newton - Gary Unmarried - CBS
- Makenzie Vega - The Good Wife - CBS

=== Best Performance in a TV Series - Guest Starring Young Actor 18-21 ===
★ Andrew Jenkins - Tower Prep - The Cartoon Network

- Hutch Dano - Law & Order: LA - NBC
- Thomas Kasp - Big Time Rush - Nickelodeon
- Austin Butler - The Defenders - CBS

=== Best Performance in a TV Series - Guest Starring Young Actress 16-21 ===
★ Katlin Mastandrea - Criminal Minds - CBS

- Erin Sanders - Big Time Rush - Nickelodeon
- Katelyn Pacitto - I'm in the Band - Disney Channel

=== Best Performance in a TV Series - Guest Starring Young Actor 14-17 ===
★ Dylan Minnette - Medium - CBS

- Gig Morton - Shattered (ep: "Where's the Line?") - E1 Entertainment
- Joey Luthman - Ghost Whisperer - CBS
- Ricardo Hoyos - Haven - Syfy
- Billy Unger - Ghost Whisperer - CBS
- Sterling Beaumon - Criminal Minds - CBS
- Brandon Soo Hoo - Community - NBC

=== Best Performance in a TV Series - Guest Starring Young Actor 11-13 ===
★ (tie) Zayne Emory - I'm in the Band - Disney Channel
★ (tie) Aaron Refvem - CSI: NY - CBS

- David Gore - Psych - USA Network
- David Burrus - Hannah Montana - Disney Channel
- Adom Osei - Supernatural - CW
- Michael Ketzner - Criminal Minds - CBS
- Nathan Cheung - Untold Stories of the E.R. - TLC
- Colin Ford - CSI: Miami - CBS

=== Best Performance in a TV Series - Guest Starring Young Actress 11-15 ===
★ Madisen Beaty - NCIS: Naval Criminal Investigative Service - CBS

- Ryan Newman - Good Luck Charlie - Disney Channel
- Bella King - Smallville - WB Network
- Katherine Bralower - Primetime: What Would You Do? - ABC
- Callie Thompson - House, M.D. - FOX
- Sadie Calvano - NCIS: Naval Criminal Investigative Service - CBS
- Kaitlyn Dever - Private Practice - ABC
- Bella Thorne - Wizards of Waverly Place - Disney Channel
- Madison Leisle - Criminal Minds - CBS
- Kelly Heyer - The Middle - ABC
- Sydney Sweeney - Chase - NBC

=== Best Performance in a TV Series - Guest Starring Young Actor Ten and Under ===
★ (tie) Parker Contreras - The Middle - ABC
★ (tie) Tucker Albrizzi - Good Luck Charlie - The Disney Channel

- Preston Bailey - Cold Case - CBS
- Jacob Ewaniuk - Rookie Blue - ABC
- Mason Cook - The Middle - ABC
- Riley Thomas Stewart - How I Met Your Mother - 20th Century Television
- Quinn Lord - Fringe - The WB Network

=== Best Performance in a TV Series - Guest Starring Young Actress Ten and Under ===
★ Samantha Bailey - Ghost Whisperer - CBS

- Joey King - Ghost Whisperer - CBS
- Olivia Steele-Falconer - Smallville - WB Network
- Sierra Pitkin - Fringe - WB Network
- Nikki Hahn - The Closer - TNT
- Bobbie Prewitt - Chase - WB Network
- Sophia Ewaniuk - Flashpoint - CTV
- Ashley Switzer - iCarly - Nickelodeon

=== Best Performance in a TV Series - Recurring Young Actor ===
★ Brock Ciarlelli - The Middle - ABC

- David Gore - Zeke and Luther - Disney XD
- Dylan Minnette - Lost - ABC
- Ricardo Hoyos - Dino Dan - Nickelodeon
- Austin MacDonald - Living in Your Car - Movie Central Network
- Quinton Lopez - The Closer - TNT
- A.J. Saudin - Degrassi: The Next Generation - CTV

=== Best Performance in a TV Series - Recurring Young Actress 17-21 ===
★ Erin Sanders - Big Time Rush - Nickelodeon

- Blaine Saunders - The Middle - ABC
- Abigail Mavity - Zeke and Luther - Disney XD

=== Best Performance in a TV Series - Recurring Young Actress 11-16 ===
★ Isabella Murad - Criminal Minds - ABC

- Bella Thorne - Big Love - HBO
- Christina Robinson - Dexter - Showtime
- Keana Bastidas - Dino Dan - Nickelodeon
- Hannah Marks - FlashForward - ABC
- Jaclyn Forbes - Dino Dan Nickelodeon
- Kelly Heyer - Raising Hope - FOX

=== Best Performance in a TV Series - Recurring Young Actor Ten and Under ===
★ Connor Gibbs - Ghost Whisperer - CBS

- Edward Sass III - The Daily Show with Jon Stewart - Comedy Central
- Preston Bailey - Dexter - Showtime
- Tucker Albrizzi - Big Time Rush - Nickelodeon
- Drew Davis - Rookie Blue - ABC

=== Best Performance in a TV Series - Recurring Young Actress Ten and Under ===
★ Mackenzie Aladjem - Nurse Jackie - Showtime

- Mary-Charles Jones - Hannah Montana - Disney Channel
- Sophia Ewaniuk - Happy Town - ABC
- Sydney Kuhne - Dino Dan - Nickelodeon
- Ava Allan - True Jackson, VP - Nickelodeon
- Hailey Sole - Private Practice - ABC

=== Best Performance in a Daytime TV Series - Young Actor ===
★ Mick Hazen - As the World Turns - CBS

- Field Cate - The Young and the Restless - CBS
- Dylan Patton - Days of Our Lives - NBC

=== Best Performance in a Daytime TV Series - Young Actress ===
★ Lexi Ainsworth - General Hospital - ABC

- Taylor Spreitler - Days of Our Lives - NBC
- Gabriela Rodriguez - Days of Our Lives - NBC

=== Best Performance in a Daytime TV Series - Young Actor 12 and Under ===
★ Tate Berney - All My Children - ABC

- Jake Vaughn - All My Children - ABC
- Aaron Sanders - General Hospital - ABC

=== Best Performance in a Daytime TV Series - Young Actress Ten and Under ===
★ Haley Pullos - General Hospital - ABC

- Mackenzie Aladjem - All My Children - ABC
- Danielle Parker - All My Children - ABC
- Lauren Boles - Days of Our Lives - NBC

=== Outstanding Young Ensemble in a TV Series ===
★ Dino Dan - Nickelodeon

Jason Spevack, Sydney Kuhne, Isaac Durnford, Jaclyn Forbes and Ricardo Hoyos

- Modern Family - ABC

Rico Rodriguez II, Nolan Gould and Ariel Winter

- Shake It Up - Disney Channel

Bella Thorne, Zendaya, Davis Cleveland, Adam Irigoyen, Roshon Fegan, Caroline Sunshine and Kenton Duty

- The Middle - ABC

Charlie McDermott, Eden Sher and Atticus Shaffer

== Best Performance in a Voice-Over Role ==
=== Best Performance in a Voice-Over Role - Young Actor ===
★ Regan Mizrahi - Dora the Explorer - Nickelodeon

- Jacob Ewaniuk - The Cat in the Hat Knows a Lot About That! - PBS
- Dallas Jokic - Babar and the Adventures of Badou - Nelvana

=== Best Performance in a Voice-Over Role - Young Actress ===
★ Jordan Van Vranken - Chadam - Warner Brothers TV

- Erika-Shaye Gair - Dinosaur Train - Jim Henson Company
- Alexa Torrington - The Cat in the Hat Knows a Lot About That! - PBS

== Best Performance in a DVD Film ==
=== Best Performance in a DVD Film - Young Actor ===
★ Colin Ford - Jack and the Beanstalk - Avalon Family Entertainment

- Randy Shelly - Kid Racer - Sterling Entertainment
- Justin Marco - Kid Racer - Sterling Entertainment
- Nic Puehse - Nic & Tristan Go Mega Dega - Phase 4 Films
- Tristan Puehse - Nic & Tristan Go Mega Dega - Phase 4 Films

=== Best Performance in a DVD Film - Young Actress ===
★ Dalila Bela - The Stranger - Anchor Bay Entertainment

- Isabella Astor - Kid Racer - Sterling Entertainment
- Danielle Chuchran - You're So Cupid! - Gravitas Ventures
- Melody Choi - The Search for Santa Paws - Walt Disney Pictures
- Michelle LaBret - The Gold Retrievers - Alpine Pictures
- Caitlin EJ Meyer - You're So Cupid! - Gravitas Ventures
- Sierra Pitkin - The Traveler - Paramount Pictures

== Best Performance in Live Theater ==
=== Best Performance in Live Theater - Young Actor ===
★ Alphonso Romero Jones II - The Lion King

- Quinton Lopez - Sick
- Adam Riegler - The Addams Family
- Marquis Kofi Rodriquez - The Lion King

=== Best Performance in Live Theater - Young Actress ===
★ (tie) Eden Sanaa Duncan Smith - August Wilson's Fences
★ (tie) Evie Louise Thompson - Yellow

- Rebecca Simpson Wallack - Peter Pan
- Melody Hollis - Annie
- Jolie Vanier - Nifty-Fifties

== Special awards ==
=== Most Promising International Entertainer ===
★ Zulfat Gabdulin (Зульфат Габдулин), Kazan, Republic of Tatarstan – Singer / Entertainer – Без булдырабыз! (We Can!)

=== Outstanding Instrumentalist ===
★ Ethan Bortnick – Pianist / Composer / Actor / Artist

=== Mickey Rooney Award ===
★ Mario Lopez – Actor / Entertainer Extraordinaire

=== Jackie Coogan Award ===
==== Contribution to Youth Through Entertainment ====
★ Waiting for "Superman" – Documentary – Paramount

=== Michael Landon Award ===
★ Huell Howser – California's Gold – PBS

=== Social Relations of Knowledge Institute Award ===
★ Modern Marvels – The History Channel
