= 33rd Young Artist Awards =

2012 US media awards ceremony

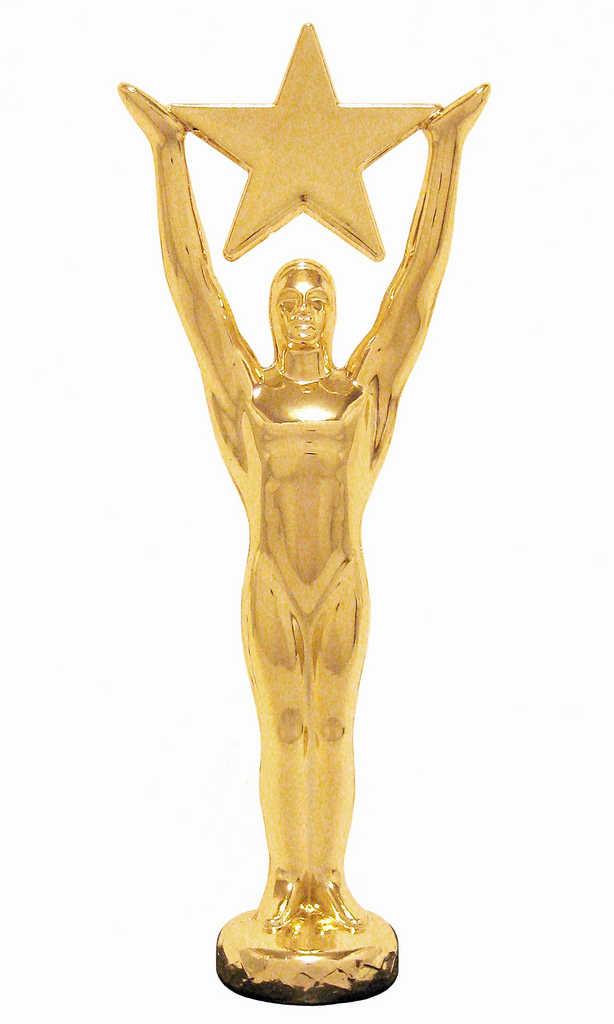
- Awarded for: Achievement in 2011 in film and television
- Date: May 6, 2012
- Site: Sportsmen's Lodge; Studio City, California
- Hosted by: Karan Brar, Rowan Blanchard and Kiernan Shipka

The 33rd Young Artist Awards ceremony, presented by the Young Artist Association, honored excellence of young performers between the ages of 5 and 21 in the fields of film, television, theater and music for the year 2011. Nominees were announced on Saturday March 31, 2012. Winners were announced on Sunday May 6, 2012 in the Empire Ballroom of the Sportsmen's Lodge in Studio City, California.

Established in 1978 by long-standing Hollywood Foreign Press Association member, Maureen Dragone, the Young Artist Association was the first organization to establish an awards ceremony specifically set to recognize and award the contributions of performers under the age of 21 in the fields of film, television, theater and music.

== Categories ==
★ Bold indicates the winner in each category.

== Best Performance in a Feature Film ==
=== Best Performance in a Feature Film - Leading Young Actor ===
★ Dakota Goyo - Real Steel - DreamWorks Pictures

- Asa Butterfield - Hugo - Paramount Pictures
- Joel Courtney - Super 8 - Paramount Pictures
- Nathan Gamble - Dolphin Tale - Warner Bros.
- Brian Gilbert - The Son of No One - Anchor Bay
- Zachary Gordon - Diary of a Wimpy Kid: Rodrick Rules - 20th Century Fox
- José Julián - A Better Life - Summit Entertainment

=== Best Performance in a Feature Film - Leading Young Actress ===
★ Chloë Grace Moretz - Hugo - Paramount Pictures

- Jordana Beatty - Judy Moody and the Not Bummer Summer - Relativity Media
- Elle Fanning - Super 8 - Paramount Pictures
- Saoirse Ronan - Hanna - Focus Features
- Ariel Winter - The Chaperone - Samuel Goldwyn Films

=== Best Performance in a Feature Film - Supporting Young Actor ===
★ Matthew J. Evans - Bad Teacher - Columbia Pictures

- Jonah Bobo - Crazy, Stupid, Love - Warner Bros.
- Karan Brar - Diary of a Wimpy Kid: Rodrick Rules - 20th Century Fox
- Robert Capron - Diary of a Wimpy Kid: Rodrick Rules - 20th Century Fox
- Mason Cook - Spy Kids: All the Time in the World - Dimension Films
- Colin Ford - We Bought a Zoo - 20th Century Fox
- Griffin Gluck - Just Go With It - Columbia Pictures
- Zach Mills - Super 8 - Paramount Pictures
- Cole Heppell - Red Riding Hood - Warner Bros.

=== Best Performance in a Feature Film - Supporting Young Actress ===
★ Laine MacNeil - Diary of a Wimpy Kid: Rodrick Rules - 20th Century Fox

- Bailey Anne Borders - The Change-Up - Universal
- Sammy Boyarsky - Rampart - Millennium Entertainment
- Kaitlyn Dever - Bad Teacher - Columbia Pictures
- Alix Kermes - Prodigal - Lost Coin Productions
- Bella King - Red Riding Hood - Warner Bros.
- Bailee Madison - Just Go With It - Columbia Pictures
- Stefanie Scott - No Strings Attached - Paramount Pictures
- Cozi Zuehlsdorff - Dolphin Tale - Warner Bros.
- Mandy Manis - The 5th Quarter - Rocky Mountain Pictures
- Savannah Lathem - California Solo - Strand Releasing

=== Best Performance in a Feature Film - Young Actor Ten and Under ===
★ Riley Thomas Stewart - The Beaver - Summit Entertainment

- Andrew Astor - Insidious - Film District/TriStar
- Preston Bailey - Judy Moody and the Not Bummer Summer - Relativity Media
- Peter Bundic - Rise of the Planet of the Apes - 20th Century Fox
- Connor & Owen Fielding - Diary of a Wimpy Kid: Rodrick Rules - 20th Century Fox
- Sean Michael Kyer - Everything and Everyone - Take a Bow Entertainment
- Robbie Tucker - Prom - Walt Disney Pictures

=== Best Performance in a Feature Film - Young Actress Ten and Under ===
★ (tie) Emma Rayne Lyle - I Don't Know How She Does It - The Weinstein Company
★ (tie) Amara Miller - The Descendants - Fox Searchlight Pictures

- Dalila Bela - Diary of a Wimpy Kid: Rodrick Rules - 20th Century Fox
- Rowan Blanchard - Spy Kids: All the Time in the World - Dimension Films
- Megan Charpentier - Red Riding Hood - Warner Bros.
- Maggie Elizabeth Jones - We Bought a Zoo - 20th Century Fox
- Arcadia Kendal - Sacrifice - Millennium Entertainment

=== Best Performance in a Feature Film - Young Ensemble Cast ===
★ Judy Moody and the Not Bummer Summer - Relativity Media

Jordana Beatty, Preston Bailey, Parris Mosteller, Garrett Ryan, Ashley Boettcher, Taylar Hender, Cameron Boyce, Jackson Odell

- Super 8 - Paramount Pictures

Joel Courtney, Elle Fanning, Ryan Lee, Zack Mills, Riley Griffiths, Gabriel Basso, Britt Flatmo

== Best Performance in an International Feature Film ==
=== Best Performance in an International Feature Film - Leading Young Performer ===
★ (tie) Antoine Olivier Pilon - Thrill of the Hills (Frisson des collines) - Canada
★ (tie) Julia Sarah Stone - The Year Dolly Parton Was My Mom - Canada

- Guillermo Campra - Águila Roja, la película (Red Eagle: The Movie) - Spain
- Thomas Doret - Le gamin au vélo (The Kid with a Bike) - Belgium
- Zoé Héran - Tomboy - France
- Stella Kunkat - Dschungelkind (Jungle Child) - Germany
- Adrian Moore - Der ganz große Traum (The Ultimate Big Dream) - Germany
- Theo Trebs - Der ganz große Traum (The Ultimate Big Dream) - Germany

== Best Performance in a Short Film ==
=== Best Performance in a Short Film - Young Actor ===
★ Ryan Grantham - Liz - UBC Film Productions

- Andy Scott Harris - From Darkness - Independent
- Nicky Korba - Coach Ricardo - Grovestreet Ent.
- Daniel Lupetina - My Guy - Simonee Films
- Matthew Nardozzi - An Ordinary Summer Day - Independent
- Anthony Restivo - Fable - Independent
- Jason Spevack - Oliver Bumps Birthday - CFC

=== Best Performance in a Short Film - Young Actress ===
★ (tie) Sarah de la Isla - The Aerial Girl - Mother Horse Productions
★ (tie) Ashley McGullam - Re-Abduction - Choto/Nygaard Production
★ (tie) Ashley Lynn Switzer - Ruby Slippers - Barefoot Girl Productions

- Ava Allen - Becoming - Dustin Todd Films
- Ashlee Fuss - Haven's Point - Majek Pictures
- Cassidi Hoag - Parkdale - CFC
- Savannah Lathem - Vanilla Promises - One Eyed Wonder Muscle
- Camryn Molnar - The Ultimate Conquest - Nikita Zubarev Production
- Angelique Restivo - Fable - Independent
- Rebecca Spicher - Certified - Hollywood Shorts
- Julia Sarah Stone - Ellipse - Alice Deegan Production
- Brandi Alyssa Young - Broken Pieces - Denver Crazies Prod.

=== Best Performance in a Short Film - Young Actor Ten and Under ===
★ Dawson Dunbar - Bred In Captivity - Simon Fraser University

- Felix Avitia - Ingles - Independent
- Brady Bryson - Mama - C-Zan
- Joshua Costea - Lemons and Lemonade - Independent
- Sean Michael Ryer - Shh! - Means of Production
- Daven Pitkin - Why does God Hate Me - Capilano University
- Aiden Wessel - Irreplaceable - SFU Film

=== Best Performance in a Short Film - Young Actress Ten and Under ===
★ Dalila Bela - Joanna Makes a Friend - Broken Mirror Films

- Vanessa Evancic - Liz - UBC Film Productions
- Merit Leighton - Monster Slayer - Independent
- Katelyn Mager - Joanna Makes a Friend - Broken Mirror Films
- Sierra Pitkin - Dead Friends - Crazy 8's

== Best Performance in a TV Movie, Miniseries or Special ==
=== Best Performance in a TV Movie, Miniseries or Special - Leading Young Actor ===
★ Nicholas Stargel - Oliver's Ghost - Hallmark

- Connor Gibbs - A Crush on You - Hallmark
- Joey Luthman - The Joey and Elise Show - DATV
- Anthony Robinson - Hercules Saves Christmas - Animal Planet
- Christopher Saavedra - We Have Your Husband - Lifetime

=== Best Performance in a TV Movie, Miniseries or Special - Leading Young Actress ===
★ Jada Facer - Love's Christmas Journey - Hallmark

- Elise Luthman - The Joey and Elise Show - DATV
- Kiernan Shipka - Smooch - Hallmark

=== Best Performance in a TV Movie, Miniseries or Special - Supporting Young Actor ===
★ Liam McKanna - Beyond the Blackboard - Hallmark

- Brennan Bailey - The Dog Who Saved Halloween - ABC Family Channel
- Matthew Knight - The Good Witch's Family - Hallmark
- Robert Naylor - Cyberbully - ABC Family Channel
- Raymond Ochoa - Other People's Kids - ABC Studio
- Bruce Salomon - Deck the Halls - TNT
- Riley Thomas Stewart - A Christmas Wedding Tail - Hallmark

=== Best Performance in a TV Movie, Miniseries or Special - Supporting Young Actress ===
★ (tie) Caitlin Carmichael - Bag of Bones - A&E TV
★ (tie) Kirstin Dorn - A Christmas Wish - Hallmark

- Megan Charpentier - He Loves Me - Lifetime
- Olivia Steele Falconer - A Fairly Odd Movie: Grow Up, Timmy Turner! - Nickelodeon
- Hannah Leigh - Meet Jane - Lifetime
- Savannah McReynolds - Beyond the Blackboard - Hallmark
- Quinn McColgan - Mildred Pierce - HBO
- Olivia Scriven - Mistletoe Over Manhattan - Hallmark
- Morgan Turner - Mildred Pierce - HBO

== Best Performance in a TV Series ==
=== Best Performance in a TV Series - Leading Young Actor ===
★ (tie) Dylan Everett - Wingin' It - Family Channel
★ (tie) Jared Gilmore - Once Upon a Time - ABC

- Devan Cohen - The Yard - Movie Central
- Will Jester - Debra! - Family Channel
- Matthew Knight - My Babysitter's a Vampire - Disney Channel
- Daniel Lupetina - The Yard - Movie Central
- Chandler Riggs - The Walking Dead - AMC

=== Best Performance in a TV Series - Leading Young Actress ===
★ (tie) Cristine Prosperi - Degrassi: The Next Generation - CTV
★ (tie) Niamh Wilson - Debra! - Family Channel

- Sami Gayle - Blue Bloods - CBS
- Jillian Rose Reed - Awkward. - MTV
- Bella Thorne - Shake It Up - Disney Channel
- Zendaya - Shake It Up - Disney Channel

=== Best Performance in a TV Series - Supporting Young Actor ===
★ (tie) Karan Brar - Jessie - Disney Channel
★ (tie) Maxim Knight - Falling Skies - TNT

- Max Burkholder - Parenthood - NBC
- Jake Johnson - Man Up! - ABC
- Austin MacDonald - Debra! - Family Channel
- Bradley Steven Perry - Good Luck Charlie - Disney Channel

=== Best Performance in a TV Series - Supporting Young Actress ===
★ Stefanie Scott - A.N.T. Farm - Disney Channel

- Ciara Bravo - Big Time Rush - Nickelodeon
- Kaitlyn Dever - Last Man Standing - ABC
- Caitlyn Taylor Love - I'm in the Band - Disney Channel

=== Best Performance in a TV Series - Guest Starring Young Actor 18-21 ===
★ Ryan Malgarini - Mike & Molly - CBS

- Scott Beaudin - Haven - SYFY
- Max Ehrich - Parenthood - NBC
- Cameron Monaghan - Rizzoli & Isles - TNT
- Boo Boo Stewart - Good Luck Charlie - Disney Channel

=== Best Performance in a TV Series - Guest Starring Young Actress 17-21 ===
★ (tie) Kara Pacitto - Pair of Kings - Disney XD
★ (tie) Katelyn Pacitto - Pair of Kings - Disney XD

- Katlin Mastandrea - The Middle - ABC
- Erin Sanders - CSI: Miami - CBS

=== Best Performance in a TV Series - Guest Starring Young Actor 14-17 ===
★ Trevor Jackson - Harry's Law - NBC

- Sterling Beaumon - Law & Order - NBC
- L. J. Benet - Wizards of Waverly Place - Disney Channel
- Harrison Boxley - Kickin' It - Disney XD
- Ricardo Hoyos - R.L. Stine's The Haunting Hour - The Hub Network
- Donnie MacNeil - Hiccups - CTV
- Brandon Soo Hoo - Workaholics - Comedy Central
- Austin Williams - A Gifted Man - CBS

=== Best Performance in a TV Series - Guest Starring Young Actress 14-16 ===
★ Rebecca Spicher - Criminal Minds - CBS

- Chelsey Bryson - Kickin' It - Disney XD
- Sami Gayle - Royal Pains - USA
- Laine MacNeil - Shattered - Global Entertainment
- Evie Louise Thompson - Shake It Up - Disney Channel

=== Best Performance in a TV Series - Guest Starring Young Actor 11-13 ===
★ (tie) Austin Michael Coleman - House M.D. - Fox
★ (tie) Baljodh Nagra - R.L. Stine's The Haunting Hour - The Hub Network

- Chandler Canterbury - Fringe - Warner Bros.
- Zach Callison - I'm in the Band - Disney XD
- Zayne Emory - Shake It Up - Disney Channel
- Dakota Goyo - R.L. Stine's The Haunting Hour - The Hub Network
- Maxim Knight - CSI: Miami - CBS
- Connor Levins - Endgame - Endemol Worldwide
- Christopher Mastandrea - Hot in Cleveland - TV Land
- Regan Mizrahi - White Collar - USA
- Jason Spevack - R.L. Stine's The Haunting Hour - The Hub Network
- Justin Tinucci - Big Love - HBO
- Mateus Ward - Sports Show with Norm Macdonald - Comedy Central

=== Best Performance in a TV Series - Guest Starring Young Actress 11-13 ===
★ (tie) Cameron Protzman - The Glades - A&E
★ (tie) Haley Pullos - House MD - FOX

- Mia Ford - Chase - NBC
- Ava Rebecca Hughes - R.L. Stine's The Haunting Hour - The Hub Network
- Madison Leisle - Love Bites - NBC
- Jessica Mcleod - R.L. Stine's The Haunting Hour - The Hub Network

=== Best Performance in a TV Series - Guest Starring Young Actor Ten and Under ===
★ Darien Provost - Mr. Young - Disney XD

- Tucker Albrizzi - Big Time Rush - Nickelodeon
- Peter Bundic - Eureka - Syfy
- Niles Fitch - Tyler Perry's House of Payne - TBS
- Connor Gibbs - Memphis Beat - TNT

=== Best Performance in a TV Series - Guest Starring Young Actress Ten and Under ===
★ Olivia Steele Falconer - Mr. Young - Disney XD

- Melody Angel - NCIS - CBS
- Francesca Capaldi - A.N.T. Farm - Disney Channel
- Caitlin Carmichael - Shake It Up - Disney Channel
- Savannah McReynolds - Private Practice - ABC
- Shyloh Oostwald - House MD - FOX
- Danielle Parker - CSI: Miami - CBS
- Marlowe Peyton - The Middle - ABC
- Malinda Rose Sass - The World's Astonishing News - NTV

=== Best Performance in a TV Series - Recurring Young Actor 17-21 ===
★ (tie) Brock Ciarlelli - The Middle - ABC
★ (tie) A.J. Saudin - Degrassi: The Next Generation - CTV

- James Coholen - Debra! - Family Channel
- Damien Haas - So Random! - Disney Channel
- Matthew Fahey - Awkward. - MTV

=== Best Performance in a TV Series - Recurring Young Actress 17-21 ===
★ Erin Sanders - Big Time Rush - Nickelodeon

- Alexandria DeBerry - A.N.T. Farm - Disney Channel
- Kelly Heyer - Raising Hope - Fox
- Victoria Justice - iCarly - Nickelodeon
- Bridgit Mendler - Wizards of Waverly Place - Disney Channel

=== Best Performance in a TV Series - Recurring Young Actor ===
★ Zayne Emory - I'm in the Band - Disney Channel

- Buddy Handleson - Shake It Up - Disney Channel
- Austin MacDonald - Living in Your Car - Movie Central
- Brando Soo Hoo - Supah Ninjas - Nickelodeon
- Tyler Stentiford - Flashpoint - CTV
- Connor & Brady Noon - Boardwalk Empire - HBO

=== Best Performance in a TV Series - Recurring Young Actress ===
★ Frédérique Dufort - Tactik - Télé-Québec

- Ava Allan - True Jackson, VP - Nickelodeon
- Kaitlyn Dever - Justified - FX
- Hannah Leigh - Kickin' It - Disney Channel
- Madison Leisle - The Walking Dead - AMC
- Lauren Owens - New Girl - Fox

=== Best Performance in a TV Series - Recurring Young Actress Ten and Under ===
★ Emily Alyn Lind - Revenge - ABC

- Mackenzie Aladjem - Nurse Jackie - Showtime
- Camden Angelis - Debra! - Family Channel
- Lucy and Josie Gallina - Boardwalk Empire - HBO
- Nikki Hahn - Jimmy Kimmel Live! - ABC

=== Best Performance in a Daytime TV Series - Young Actor ===
★ (tie) Andrew Trischitta - One Life to Live - ABC
★ (tie) Austin Williams - One Life to Live - ABC

- Aramis Knight - General Hospital - ABC
- Garrett Ryan - The Young and the Restless - CBS
- Aaron Sanders - General Hospital - ABC

=== Best Performance in a Daytime TV Series - Young Actress ===
★ Haley Pullos - General Hospital - ABC

- Lexi Ainsworth - General Hospital - ABC
- Ellery Sprayberry - The Young and the Restless - CBS

=== Best Performance in a Daytime TV Series - Young Actor 12 and Under ===
★ (tie) Tate Berney - All My Children - ABC
★ (tie) Robbie Tucker - The Young and the Restless - CBS

- Jake Vaughn - All My Children - ABC

=== Best Performance in a Daytime TV Series - Young Actress Ten and Under ===
★ Danielle Parker - All My Children - ABC

- Mackenzie Aladjem - All My Children - ABC
- Lauren Boles - Days of Our Lives - NBC
- Dannika Liddell - All My Children - ABC

=== Outstanding Young Ensemble in a TV Series ===
★ Debra! - Family Channel

Niamh Wilson, Will Jester, Austin MacDonald, Alicia Josipovich, James Coholan, Camden Angelis

- The Yard - Movie Central

Keana Bastidas, Alex Cardillo, Devan Cohen, Quintin Colantoni, Shemar Charles, Daniel Lupetina, Sarah Cramner, John Fleming, Olivia Scriven, Jared Karp, Slam Yu

- Shake It Up - Disney Channel

Zendaya, Bella Thorne, Davis Cleveland, Adam Irigoyen, Kenton Duty, Caroline Sunshine, Roshon Fegan

== Best Performance in a Voice-Over Role ==
=== Best Performance in a Voice-Over Role - Young Actor ===
★ (tie) Colin Ford - Jake and the Never Land Pirates - Disney
★ (tie) Graeme Jokic - Franklin and Friends - Nelvanna Com
★ (tie) Mark Ramsay - Franklin and Friends - Nelvanna Com

- Jacob Ewaniuk - The Cat in the Hat Knows a Lot About That! - PBS
- Jet Jurgensmeyer - Special Agent Oso - Disney Jr
- John Paul Ruttan - Doodlebops Rockin' Road Show - CBC
- Jake Sim - Stella and Sam - Family Channel

=== Best Performance in a Voice-Over Role - Young Actress ===
★ (tie) Grace Rolek - Happiness Is a Warm Blanket, Charlie Brown - Warner Home Video
★ (tie) Alexandria Suarez - Dora the Explorer - Nickelodeon

- Abigail Breslin - Rango - Paramount Pictures
- Nissae Isen - My Big Big Friend - Treehouse TV (as Yuri)
- Emily Alyn Lind - Prep & Landing: Naughty vs. Nice - Disney
- Ramona Marquez - Arthur Christmas - Sony Pictures

== Best Performance in a DVD Film ==
=== Best Performance in a DVD Film - Young Ensemble Cast ===
★ Spooky Buddies - Walt Disney Home Entertainment

Skyler Gisondo, Tucker Albrizzi, Sierra McCormick, Jake Johnson, Sage Ryan

- Monster Mutt - Monster Muttt & Burnside Entertainment

Rhiannon Leigh Wryn, Billy Unger, China Anderson

== Best Performance in Live Theater ==
=== Best Performance in Live Theater - Young Actor ===
★ (tie) L.J. Benet - To Kill a Mockingbird - Lex Theatre, CA
★ (tie) Aiden Eyrick - Jerusalem - Music Box Theatre, NY

- Dusan Brown - The Lion King - Auditorium Theatre, NY
- Niles Fitch - The Lion King - North American Tour
- Andy Scott Harris - South Street - Pasadena Playhouse, CA
- Jonah Lloyd - Once Upon a Dream - The It Factor Theatre, CA
- Matthew Nardozzi - 13: The Musical - Fringe Festival, FL
- Jordan Wessel - Great Expectations - Gateway Theatre, Vancouver
- Lewis Grosso - Mary Poppins - New Amsterdam Theatre, NY

=== Best Performance in Live Theater - Young Actress ===
★ Hannah Lloyd - Once Upon a Dream - The It Factor Theatre, CA

- Lauren Delfs - Fever Chart - Eclipse Theatre, Chicago
- Kara Oates - Mary Poppins - New Amsterdam Theatre, NY
- Eden Sanaa Duncan Smith - The Lion King - Minskoff Theatre, NY
- Jolie Vanier - Once On This Island - Palmer Cultural Center, Switzerland

== Special awards ==
=== Outstanding Instrumentalist ===
★ Rio Mangini – Pianist / Actor / Artist

=== Michael Landon Award ===
★ Ethan Flower – Inspirational Actor to Youth

=== Social Relations of Knowledge Institute Award ===
★ Black Gold – truTV
