= Jacob Ewaniuk =

Canadian actor (born 2000)

- Born: September 1, 2000 (age 25); Edmonton, Alberta, Canada
- Occupation: Actor
- Years active: 2003–present

Jacob Ewaniuk (born September 1, 2000) is a Canadian actor. He is well-known for voicing Nick in seasons 1 and 2 of The Cat in the Hat Knows a Lot About That!.

He was discovered by Ford Models at age 9 1/2 and began acting thereafter when he got his first role as Young Murdoch in an episode of Murdoch Mysteries.

== Life and career ==
Ewaniuk was born on September 1, 2000, in Edmonton, Alberta but raised in Toronto, Ontario. He has a younger sister, Sophia, who is also a child actress.

Ewaniuk is the voice of Nick in seasons 1 and 2 of The Cat in the Hat Knows a Lot About That! and Timmy Tibble in Arthur starting with season 16. He also voiced Hockey Math Monitor in the Season 2 of Monster Math Squad, Jasper in Super Why! and Billy in The Adventures of Chuck and Friends. He voiced a dual role (Spotty Pig and Twin Pigs) in Wibbly Pig and has been one of the Wild Kratt Kids in Wild Kratts. He also voiced Connor/Catboy in season 1 of PJ Masks and Spike in The Doozers. He landed a role in the premiere episode of Rookie Blue.

In 2011, at the 32nd Young Artist Awards, Ewaniuk was nominated for Best Performance in a TV Series for his role as a Guest Star in Rookie Blue and Best Performance in a Voice-Over Role in The Cat in the Hat Knows a Lot About That!.

In 2012, at the 33rd Young Artist Awards, Ewaniuk was again nominated for Best Performance in a Voice-Over Role in The Cat in the Hat Knows a Lot About That!.

He appeared in the films Servitude and Dead Before Dawn 3D.

In 2015, he provided the voice of Junior in Total Drama Presents: The Ridonculous Race.

Jacob is also one of the key characters in the Canadian web TV series Kid's Town where he plays Keith Lightfoot. He starred in 12 episodes that were made in 2013.

As of 2023, Jacob is now pursuing a PhD in Quantum Nanophotonics at Queen's university and is currently the TA for a nanophotonics class. Jacob's experience in acting and voice overs has carried over to his teaching responsibilities, and is considered to be an able instructor barring the fact that he has avoided sharing his background as an actor.

== Filmography ==
=== Voice roles ===
Year	Title	Role
2009	Wibbly Pig	Spotty Pig, Pig Twins (voice) (Canada)
2010	Doodlebops Rockin' Road Show	Noah
2010–2015	The Cat in the Hat Knows a Lot About That!	Nick (seasons 1-2)
2010–2011	The Adventures of Chuck and Friends	Billy
2011	Super Why!	Jasper
2011	The Cat in the Hat Knows a Lot About Christmas!	Nick
2011–2015	Wild Kratts	Wild Kratt Kid
2012	Monster Math Squad	Hockey Math Monitor
2012–2016	Arthur	Timmy Tibble
2013–2014	The Doozers	Spike
2014	BeyWarriors: BeyRaiderz	Jimmy Cruz
2015	Chirp	Chirp (Bird)
2015	Total Drama Presents: The Ridonculous Race	Dwayne Jr. (Also known as Junior.)
2015–2017	PJ Masks	Connor/Catboy (season 1)

== Other activities ==
Ewaniuk also competes in several karting series in North America. In 2011 he competed in the Rotax Pan American Challenge and the SPORTALITY TRAK Championship.
