= Laine MacNeil =

Canadian actress (born 1996)

- Born: February 22, 1996 (age 30); Surrey, British Columbia, Canada
- Occupation: Actress
- Years active: 2009–present

External image
- Laine MacNeil IMDb photo

Laine MacNeil (born February 22, 1996) is a Canadian actress. She made her motion picture debut at the age of 13, and is best known for her role as Patty Farrell in the Diary of a Wimpy Kid feature film franchise, which earned her five Young Artist Award nominations, including a win as Best Young Supporting Actress in a Feature Film.

== Life and career ==
MacNeil was born in Surrey, British Columbia. She attended Lord Tweedsmuir Secondary School. Her brother Donnie is also an actor. MacNeil began her acting career at a young age and appeared in her first significant film production in a non-negligible marginal role. In Mr. Troop Mom with all-rounder George Lopez in 2009, MacNeil had the role of the Kayla. The following year, MacNeil had her international breakthrough when she was cast in the role months before as "Patty Farrell" in the first film adaptation of the successful book series Diary of a Wimpy Kid.

For her performance in the film, MacNeil was awarded and honored several times. She has received many awards in the Young Artist Awards 2011 nominated for a Young Artist Award in the category "Best Performance in a Feature Film - Supporting Young Actress" on August 3, 2012. In addition, it was with the cast of Diary of a Wimpy Kid, consisting of Peyton List, Karan Brar, Robert Capron, Grayson Russell, Zachary Gordon, and Devon Bostick at the same ceremony with a Young Artist Award in the category "Best Performance in a Feature Film - Young Ensemble Cast".

In 2011, MacNeil followed for numerous other appearances, including among other things a guest appearance on the short-lived Canadian police series Shattered. They also took over in 2011 published the second part of the film, Diary of a Wimpy Kid: Rodrick Rules, again in the role of "Patty Farrell" and was also still in a guest role in the series R. L. Stine's The Haunting Hour: The Series. After these engagements, MacNeil was in the following year again represented at the Young Artist Awards. She received the award of the Young Artist Awards 2012 a nomination in the category "Best Performance in a TV Series - Guest Starring Young Actress 14-16" for her performance in Shattered and was additionally a Young Artist Award in the category "Best Performance in a Feature Film - Supporting Young Actress" for their involvement in Diary of a Wimpy Kid: Rodrick Rules.

In 2012, MacNeil had a guest role on RL Stine's The Haunting Hour and made an appearance in an episode of Falling Skies. In 2012, she played a supporting role in Norman Buckley's directorial debut film The Pregnancy Project and returned to Diary of a Wimpy Kid: Dog Days, where MacNeil was nominated to the Young Artist Awards 2013 in the categories of "Best Performance in a TV series - Guest Starring Young Actress 14–16" for her performance in American television series "Falling Skies" and "Best Performance in a Feature Film - Supporting Young Actress" for her performance as Patty Farrell in Diary of a Wimpy Kid: Dog Days and part of the "Best Performance in a Feature Film - Young Ensemble Cast" where the cast won.

In 2013, MacNeil appeared on Canadian-American horror film Horns starring Daniel Radcliffe, where she played the role of young Glenna. That same year, MacNeil appeared on three episodes of the American crime drama The Killing and again on an episode of R. L. Stine's The Haunting Hour: The Series

In 2014, MacNeil appeared on several TV series such as Almost Human, Motive, and Strange Empire. She also appeared on two TV films, The Unauthorized Saved by the Bell Story and Damaged. MacNeil was nominated that same year to the 35th Young Artist Awards in the category of "Best Performance in a TV Series - Guest Starring Young Actress 17-21" for her appearance in R. L. Stine's The Haunting Hour and in the category of "Best Performance in a TV Series - Recurring Young Actress 17-21" for her recurring role in The Killing. MacNeil also worked for a few months as a Fright Night Performer at the Pacific National Exhibition.

MacNeil was nominated on 2015 for the 36th Young Artist Awards in the category of "Best Performance in a TV Series - Guest Starring Young Actress 17-21" and the Joey Awards in the category of "Best Actress in a TV Drama Guest Starring Role Age 14-18 Years" for her work on Strange Empire. Outside of acting, MacNeil started to work that same year as a fitness coach in The Dailey Method where she continues to work as of 2020.

Between 2016 and 2017, MacNeil had a recurring role on You Me Her's first two seasons as Ava Matherfield, Lori's teenage daughter. In 2016, she appeared on On the Farm and The X-Files. In 2017, MacNeil was nominated for the Canadian Screen Awards in the category of "Best Performance by an Actress in a Featured Supporting Role or Guest Role in a Comedic Series" for her work on You Me Her. That same year, MacNeil appeared on the American movie The Edge of Seventeen, starring Hailee Steinfeld, Woody Harrelson, Kyra Sedgwick and Haley Lu Richardson, playing a TCBY girl. Furthermore, she worked between 2016 and 2017 as a Belayer in Coastal Climbing Centre.

In 2018, MacNeil appeared on Episode 4 of Lee Fraser's podcast Monological.

In 2019, MacNeil appeared on Episode 2, "Noise, Noise, Noise" of the American television series Deadly Class, portraying the role of Rory's daughter.

In 2020, MacNeil had a supporting role in the American science fiction comedy film Spontaneous, starring Katherine Langford, Charlie Plummer, Hayley Law, Piper Perabo, Rob Huebel and Yvonne Orji, playing the role of Jenna Dalton.

== Filmography ==
=== Film ===
Year	Title	Role	Notes
2010	Diary of a Wimpy Kid	Patty Farrell	
2011	Diary of a Wimpy Kid: Rodrick Rules	Patty Farrell	
2012	Diary of a Wimpy Kid: Dog Days	Patty Farrell	
2013	Horns	Glenna Shepherd (age 13)	
2016	Unclaimed	Girl	AKA, On the Farm
2016	The Edge of Seventeen	TCBY Girl	
2020	Spontaneous	Jenna Dalton	

=== Television ===
Year	Title	Role	Notes
2009	Mr. Troop Mom	Kayla	TV film
2011	Shattered	Mia Simms	"Key with No Lock"
2011	R. L. Stine's The Haunting Hour: The Series	Kayla	"Catching Cold"
2012	The Pregnancy Project	Payton	TV film
2012	Falling Skies	Teresa	"Worlds Apart"
2013	The Killing	Angie Gower	"Eminent Domain", "Try"
2013	R. L. Stine's The Haunting Hour: The Series	Tracey	"Séance"
2014	Almost Human	Emily Wilson	"Disrupt"
2014	Motive	Marlisse Grauer	"The Made Me a Criminal"
2014	The Unauthorized Saved by the Bell Story	Teenage Girl #1	TV film
2014	Damaged	Macey	TV film
2014	Strange Empire	Martha	"How Far Is Heaven"
2015	R.L. Stine's Monsterville: Cabinet of Souls	Andrea Payton	TV film
2015	The Hollow	Jill	TV film
2016	The X-Files	Girl	"Babylon"
2016–2017	You Me Her	Ava	Recurring role
2019	Deadly Class	Rory's Daughter	"Noise, Noise, Noise"
2025	The Last of Us	Seraphite	"Feel Her Love"

== Accolades ==
Year	Award	Category	Work	Result	Ref.
2011	Young Artist Award	Best Performance in a Feature Film - Supporting Young Actress	Diary of a Wimpy Kid	Nominated	
2011	Young Artist Award	Best Performance in a Feature Film - Young Ensemble Cast; (with Zachary Gordon, Karan Brar, Robert Capron, Grayson Russell, Devon Bostick, Alex Ferris, Chloë Grace Moretz)	Diary of a Wimpy Kid	Won	
2012	Young Artist Award	Best Performance in a Feature Film - Supporting Young Actress	Diary of a Wimpy Kid: Rodrick Rules	Won	
2012	Young Artist Award	Best Performance in a TV Series - Guest Starring Young Actress 14-16	Shattered	Nominated	
2013	Young Artist Award	Best Performance in a Feature Film - Supporting Young Actress	Diary of a Wimpy Kid: Dog Days	Nominated	
2013	Young Artist Award	Best Performance in a Feature Film - Young Ensemble Cast; (with Zachary Gordon, Robert Capron, Peyton List, Karan Brar, Connor & Owen Fielding, Devon Bostick, Grayson Russell)	Diary of a Wimpy Kid: Dog Days	Won	
2013	Young Artist Award	Best Performance in a TV series - Guest Starring Young Actress 14–16	Falling Skies	Nominated	
2014	Young Artist Award	Best Performance in a TV Series - Guest Starring Young Actress 17-21	R. L. Stine's The Haunting Hour	Nominated	
2014	Young Artist Award	Best Performance in a TV Series - Recurring Young Actress 17-21	The Killing	Nominated	
2015	Young Artist Awards	Best Performance in a TV Series - Guest Starring Young Actress 17-21	Strange Empire	Nominated	
2015	Joey Awards	Best Actress in a TV Drama Guest Starring Role Age 14-18 Years	Strange Empire	Nominated	
2017	Canadian Screen Awards	Best Performance by an Actress in a Featured Supporting Role or Guest Role in a Comedic Series	You Me Her	Nominated	
2021	Leo Awards	Best Performance in a Youth or Children's Program or Series	An Introvert's Guide To High School	Nominated	
