= Karan Brar =

American actor (born 1999)

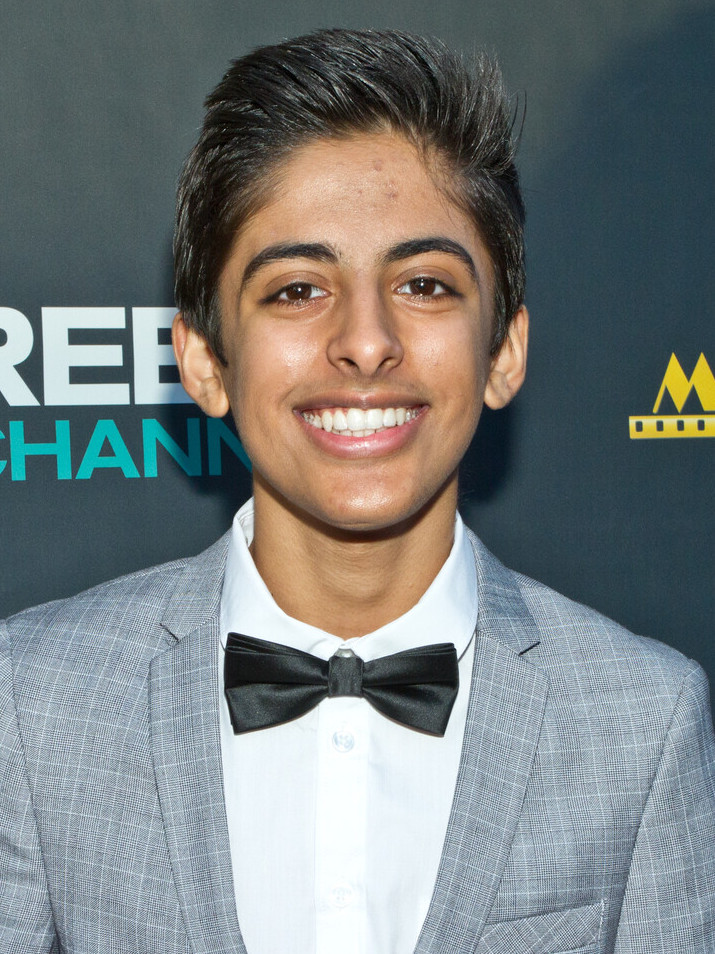
- Brar in 2015
- Born: January 18, 1999 (age 27); Redmond, Washington, U.S.
- Occupation: Actor
- Years active: 2010–present

Karan Brar (born January 18, 1999) is an American actor and director. He had his big break portraying Chirag Gupta in the Diary of a Wimpy Kid film franchise (2010-12) and landed his breakthrough role as Ravi Ross on the Disney Channel Original Series Jessie (2011-2015) and its spin-off series Bunk'd (2015-2018). He had lent his voice to animated projects such as Sofia the First (2012-2013), Mr. Peabody and Sherman (2014), Mira, Royal Detective (2020-22) and Batman: The Doom That Came to Gotham (2023) while his film credits include Invisible Sister (2015), Pacific Rim Uprising (2018), Stargirl, The F**k-It List and Hubie Halloween (all in 2020).

== Early life ==
Karan Brar was born on January 18, 1999, in Redmond, Washington, to parents who are of Punjabi ancestry. He was raised in Bothell, Washington, and has an older sister named Sabreena. Brar attended Cedar Wood Elementary School. He studied acting at John Robert Powers and Patti Kalles workshops.

== Career ==
Brar began his acting career at the age of 11, starring as Indian middle schooler Chirag Gupta in the comedy feature film Diary of a Wimpy Kid. Brar naturally speaks with an American accent and worked with a dialect coach to perfect his Indian accent for the role.

In March 2011, Brar reprised his role as Chirag Gupta in the feature film sequel Diary of a Wimpy Kid: Rodrick Rules. In October 2011, it was confirmed that he would also be reprising his role as Chirag for the third installment of the Wimpy Kid franchise, Diary of a Wimpy Kid: Dog Days, released on August 3, 2012. In April 2010, he appeared in the Seeds of Compassion advertorial campaign announcing the Dalai Lama's visit to Seattle, as well as appearing in commercials for Shell Gasoline and Committee for Children.

From 2011 to 2015, Brar starred in Jessie as Indian adoptee Ravi Ross. Ravi was originally intended to be a South American boy named Javier, but casting directors were impressed with Brar during the audition process and reimagined the character for him.

In February 2015, the Jessie spinoff Bunk'd was announced, in which Brar reprised his role as Ravi Ross. That year, he played the role of George in the Disney Channel film Invisible Sister. In 2018, he had a minor role in the science fiction film Pacific Rim Uprising.

In 2026, he appeared in Data at the Lucille Lortel Theatre, Off-Broadway.

== Personal life ==
Brar lived in the Los Angeles area with his parents and older sister, until he moved in with fellow actors Cameron Boyce and Sophie Reynolds in May 2019. On November 30, 2023, Brar penned an essay for Teen Vogue, detailing his struggles with PTSD and major depressive disorder, and coming out as bisexual.

== Filmography ==
=== Film ===
Film
Year	Title	Role	Notes
2010	Diary of a Wimpy Kid	Chirag Gupta	
2011	Diary of a Wimpy Kid: Rodrick Rules	Chirag Gupta	
2012	Diary of a Wimpy Kid: Dog Days	Chirag Gupta	
2012	Chilly Christmas	Caps	Direct-to-video
2014	Mr. Peabody & Sherman	Mason	Voice
2018	Pacific Rim Uprising	Suresh Khuran	
2020	Stargirl	Kevin	
2020	The F**k-It List	Nico Gomes	
2020	The Argument	Actor Brett	
2020	Hubie Halloween	Deli Mike Mundi	
2023	Batman: The Doom That Came to Gotham	Sanjay "Jay" Tawde	Voice, direct-to-video
2025	Queens of the Dead	Officer Trayvis	

=== Television ===
Television
Year	Title	Role	Notes
2011–2015	Jessie	Ravi Ross	Main role
2012	Pair of Kings	Tito	Episode: "I Know What You Did Last Sunday"
2013	Sofia the First	Prince Zandar	Voice, 4 episodes
2013–2015	Teens Wanna Know	Himself	3 episodes
2013–2014	Pass the Plate	Himself	11 episodes
2014	Lab Rats	Kal Zar	Episode: "Alien Gladiators"
2014	Chasing LA	Himself	1 episode
2014	Storyline Online	Himself	1 episode
2014	Ultimate Spider-Man	Ravi Ross	Voice, episode: "Halloween Night at the Museum"
2015–2018, 2021, 2022	Bunk'd	Ravi Ross	Main role (seasons 1–3), directed 3 episodes
2015	Invisible Sister	George	Television film
2016	The Night Shift	Omed	Episode: "The Thing With Feathers"
2018	Youth & Consequences	Dipankar Gosh	Recurring role
2018	Champions	Arjun	1 episode
2019	Schooled	Reza Alavi	Episode: "There's No Fighting in Fight Club"
2019	Epic Night	Lillis	4 episodes
2019	Cleopatra in Space	Gozi	Voice
2020–2022	Mira, Royal Detective	Prince Veer	Voice, main role
2023	Family Guy	Chase	Voice, episode: "Vat Man and Rob 'Em"
2024	Hailey's On It!	Sanjay Singh	Voice, episode: "I Wanna Dance With My Buddy"

=== Theater ===
Year	Title	Role	Notes
2026	Data	Maneesh	Lucille Lortel Theatre

=== Video games ===
Year	Title	Role	Notes
2024	Concord	Daw	

=== Podcast ===
Podcast
Year	Title	Role	Notes
2021	The Beautiful Liar	Evan	7 episodes

== Awards and nominations ==
Awards
Year	Award	Category	Work	Result	Ref.
2011	Young Artist Awards	Best Performance in a Feature Film – Young Ensemble Cast (Note: Zachary Gordon, Robert Capron, Devon Bostick, Alex Ferris, Chloë Grace Moretz, Laine MacNeil and Grayson Russell)	Diary of a Wimpy Kid	Won	
2012	Young Artist Awards	Best Performance in a Feature Film – Supporting Young Actor	Diary of a Wimpy Kid: Rodrick Rules	Nominated	
2012	Young Artist Awards	Best Performance in a TV series – Supporting Young Actor	Jessie	Won	
2013	Young Artist Awards	Best Performance in a Feature Film – Supporting Young Actor	Diary of a Wimpy Kid: Dog Days	Nominated	
2013	Young Artist Awards	Best Performance in a Feature Film – Young Ensemble Cast (Note: Shared with Zachary Gordon, Robert Capron, Peyton List, Laine MacNeil, Connor & Owen Fielding, Devon Bostick and Grayson Russell)	Diary of a Wimpy Kid: Dog Days	Won	
2013	Young Artist Awards	Best Performance in a TV Series – Supporting Young Actor	Jessie	Nominated	
2014	NAACP Image Awards	Outstanding Performance in a Youth/Children's Program (Series or Special)	Jessie	Nominated	
2018	Young Entertainer Awards	Best Young Ensemble – Television Series (Note: Shared with Skai Jackson, Peyton List and Miranda May)	Bunk'd	Won	
2019	Kids' Choice Awards	Favorite Male TV Star	Bunk'd	Nominated	
