= Madison Leisle =

American actress (born 1999)

- Born: June 2, 1999 (age 27)
- Occupation: Actress
- Years active: 2005–present

Madison Leisle (born June 2, 1999) is an American actress. She is known for her recurring role in the television shows, Ghost Whisperer, where she portrayed Julia Miller, and Grey's Anatomy as Lisa the child. She also has a role in the 2010 movie Kill Katie Malone. She has also appeared in a number of independent films and short films.

== Personal life ==
Leisle was born June 2, 1999, and has two brothers who also act, Austin Leisle and Parker Contreras.

== Career ==
Leisle made her debut in the television series The Studio, where she portrayed the 4-year-old version of Kelly Overton's character, Heather Falls. In 2005, she was featured in a television special, Comedy Central's Last Laugh '05. Leisle had a role in the short film, Shades of Grey and the television movie Love's Abiding Joy in 2006. In 2007, she played Lisa the child for two episodes of Grey's Anatomy. Leisle appeared in the television series The Mentalist and Ghost Whisperer in 2009. In 2010, she will be seen in the short film A Fire in a Dovecot and the feature film Kill Katie Malone. She was a series regular on the American television series Are You Smarter Than a 5th Grader?, after joining the class in September 2010.

== Filmography ==
=== Film ===
Year	Title	Role	Notes
2006	Shades of Grey	Chelsea	Short
2008	Maro	Carnival Child	Short
2009	The City of Lights	Jade	Short
2009	Broken	Anna Dodge	Short
2010	Kill Katie Malone	Little Girl	
2010	A Fire in a Dovecot	Tarah	Short
2012	Free Samples	Anna	
2014	Dognapped	Young Julie	
2014	Inherent Vice	Golden Fang Daughter	
2016	Internet Famous	KimmyCam	
2018	Almost Home	Jenny	Post-production

=== Television ===
Year	Title	Role	Notes
2005	The Studio	Heather (age 4)	"Pilot"
2005	Last Laugh '05	Choir Girl	TV film
2006	Love's Abiding Joy	Annie	TV film
2007	Grey's Anatomy	Lisa the Child	"Walk on Water", "Drowning on Dry Land"
2009	The Mentalist	Emily Derask	"Red Badge"
2009	Ghost Whisperer	Julia	"See No Evil", "Dead Listing", "Lost in the Shadows"
2010	Criminal Minds	Heather Jacobs	"What Happens at Home..."
2011	Desperate Housewives	Kid	"The Lies Ill-Concealed"
2011	Love Bites	Emma	"Too Much Information"
2011	The Walking Dead: Torn Apart	Jamie	"Everything Dies", "Family Matters", "Step-Mother"
2012	Stevie TV	Khloé Kardashian	"1.1"
2013	Touch	Nicole	"Event Horizon"
2013	Shameless	Ashley	"The Sins of My Caretaker"
2013	Hot Package	Victoria	"Pilot"
2014	Growing Up and Down	Chloe	TV film
2019	Brooklyn Nine-Nine	Whitney Grubner	"Ticking Clocks"

== Awards and nominations ==
Award	Year	Category	Result	Work
Young Artist Award	2010	Best Performance in a Short Film - Young Actress	Won	The City of Lights
Young Artist Award	2010	Best Performance in a TV Series - Recurring Young Actress	Nominated	Ghost Whisperer
Young Artist Award	2011	Best Performance in a TV Series - Guest Starring Young Actress 11-15	Nominated	Criminal Minds
Young Artist Award	2012	Best Performance in a TV Series - Recurring Young Actress	Nominated	The Walking Dead
Young Artist Award	2012	Best Performance in a TV Series - Guest Starring Young Actress 11-13	Nominated	Love Bites
Young Artist Award	2013	Best Performance in a TV Series - Guest Starring Young Actress 11-13	Nominated	Stevie TV
