= Diary of a Wimpy Kid: Rodrick Rules (2011 film) =

2011 comedy film by David Bowers

- Theatrical release poster
- Directed by: David Bowers
- Screenplay by: Jeff Judah; Gabe Sachs
- Based on: Diary of a Wimpy Kid: Rodrick Rules by Jeff Kinney
- Produced by: Nina Jacobson; Brad Simpson
- Starring: Zachary Gordon; Devon Bostick; Rachael Harris; Robert Capron; Steve Zahn
- Cinematography: Jack N. Green
- Edited by: Troy Takaki
- Music by: Edward Shearmur
- Production companies: Fox 2000 Pictures; Color Force
- Distributed by: 20th Century Fox
- Release dates: March 17, 2011 (Singapore); March 25, 2011 (United States)
- Running time: 100 minutes
- Country: United States
- Language: English
- Budget: $18–21 million
- Box office: $72.5 million

Diary of a Wimpy Kid: Rodrick Rules is a 2011 American comedy film directed by David Bowers, and written by Jeff Judah and Gabe Sachs, based on the 2008 novel. It stars Zachary Gordon, Devon Bostick, Rachael Harris, Robert Capron and Steve Zahn. It is the second installment in the Diary of a Wimpy Kid film series, following Diary of a Wimpy Kid (2010), and follows the relationship between seventh grader Greg Heffley and his older brother, Rodrick. It was announced in May 2010, and principal photography began in August 2010.

The film was released on March 25, 2011, by 20th Century Fox. It received mixed reviews from critics and grossed $72 million. A sequel, Diary of a Wimpy Kid: Dog Days, was released in 2012, and an animated adaptation of the book was released in 2022.

== Plot ==
Frank and Susan Heffley tell their sons, Greg and Rodrick, that they need to spend more time together. Susan incentivizes them with "mom bucks", which they will earn for real money depending on the hours they get along together, as she is writing a parenting column in the local newspaper. When a local talent show is announced, Rodrick hopes it will be the big break for his band, Löded Diper. As a prank, he later stains Greg's pants with chocolate at church, causing a fight and hurting Susan's reputation.

Susan, Frank, and their youngest son, Manny, go on a trip, leaving Greg and Rodrick home for the weekend to work on their bonding, along that they are not allowed to have any guests. Disobeying these orders, Rodrick throws a wild party by inviting his teenage friends over, in which Greg and his best friend, Rowley Jefferson, participate, and Greg and Rodrick start to bond.

The next morning, they receive a voicemail from Susan and Frank saying Manny is sick, so they will be returning home early. In a panic, they manage to clean up the house, but notice that graffiti in permanent marker has been put on the bathroom door; they switch it with one from the basement, only to realize that it lacks a lock. Susan notices and confronts Greg; he claims Rodrick only had people over for band practice, and begs her not to punish Rodrick, saying it would ruin their improving relationship. Rodrick, thinking Greg kept their secret, gives him advice on both school and women.

Later, photographic evidence of the party is discovered when Frank attempts to present a slideshow of his Civil War figurines to Susan's editors. He and Susan punish Greg and Rodrick by having them spend the weekend with their grandfather at his retirement home and prohibit Rodrick from participating in the talent show. At the retirement home, Greg runs into his classmate and crush, Holly Hills, who is visiting her grandmother. She is, similarly, the middle child between a malicious older sibling and spoiled younger one and they become good friends.

The family goes to see the talent show, where Rodrick finds he has been kicked out of his own band by Bill Walter, a guitarist he recently recruited, while Rowley's magic act is in jeopardy due to his assistant's stage fright. Greg strikes a deal with Susan that he will be Rowley's assistant if she lets Rodrick perform. "The Remarkable Rowley" and "Greg The Great" are praised by the audience, including Holly, believing the act is a comedy skit with intentional mistakes. The audience is not as impressed by Löded Diper, until Susan starts dancing at the edge of the stage, prompting the crowd to join in. Frank secretly videos her dancing, while Rodrick kicks Bill out of the band and reconciles with Greg.

Greg and Rowley upload the video of Löded Diper being upstaged by Susan's dancing to YouTube, going viral, angering Rodrick.

== Cast ==
- Zachary Gordon as Greg Heffley, the middle son of Susan and Frank and the brother of Rodrick and Manny
- Devon Bostick as Rodrick Heffley, Greg and Manny's older brother and Susan and Frank's oldest son
- Rachael Harris as Susan Heffley, Rodrick, Greg, and Manny's mother
- Robert Capron as Rowley Jefferson, Greg's best friend
- Steve Zahn as Frank Heffley, Rodrick, Greg, and Manny's father
- Fran Kranz as Bill Walter, a new member of Rodrick's band
- Peyton List as Holly Hills, Greg's love interest
- Karan Brar as Chirag Gupta, a friend of Greg's
- Grayson Russell as Fregley, Greg's classmate
- Laine MacNeil as Patty Farrell, Greg's arch-enemy since kindergarten
- Connor and Owen Fielding as Manny Heffley, Rodrick and Greg's younger brother and Susan and Frank's youngest son
- John Shaw as Mr. Draybick, Greg's history teacher
- Jeff Kinney as Mr. Hills, Holly's father (uncredited)
- Bryce Hodgson as Ben, one of Rodrick's friends
- Terence Kelly as Grandpa Heffley, Frank's father and Rodrick, Greg, and Manny's grandfather
- Belita Moreno as Mrs. Norton, a drama teacher at Greg's school
- Andrew McNee as Coach Malone, Greg's gym teacher
- Alfred E. Humphreys as Mr. Jefferson, Rowley's father who dislikes Greg
- Serge Houde as Mr. Salz, an editor for Susan's column
- Teryl Rothery as Mrs. Kohan, another editor for Susan's column
- Melissa Roxburgh as Rachel Lewis, one of the girls at Rodrick's house party
- Dalila Bela as Taylor Pringle, a girl who celebrated her birthday at the roller rink

== Production ==
Talks of a sequel were announced after the release of the first, but was not officially announced until May 12, 2010, announcing that it would be released on March 25, 2011. Dune Entertainment financed the film.

Principal photography began in August 2010, with filming taking place in Vancouver, British Columbia and New Westminster, British Columbia from August 23 to October 27, 2010. The mall scene was filmed at Park Royal Mall in West Vancouver. The roller rink scene was filmed at the PNE Agrodome, due to Vancouver lacking a real roller rink.

== Marketing and release ==
The trailer was shown with Gulliver's Travels on December 25, 2010. It was later online on January 3, 2011. A poster was released there after on January 14, 2011. In February 2011, an exclusive online-only trailer was released on the "Wimpy Kid Movie" YouTube channel, officialwimpmovie. Due to the success of the first film in Singapore, the film was released there eight days before the US release on March 17, 2011. It was released in Brazil on September 16, 2011. A TV spot of the movie was released in March 2011.

=== Home media ===
The film was released on a stand-alone DVD, a special edition double DVD pack, and a Blu-ray/DVD/digital copy combo pack on June 21, 2011. One of the bonus shorts was shown during iParty with Victorious on Nickelodeon at 8:00 PM on June 11, 2011.

== Reception ==
=== Box office ===
The film made $7.3 million on its opening day, ranking #2 behind Sucker Punch. It managed to rank #1 in the weekend box office. In the UK, it debuted at #3 in the weekend box office behind Pirates of the Caribbean: On Stranger Tides and The Hangover Part II. The film eventually grossed $52,698,535 in the US and Canada and $19,718,859 in other countries for a worldwide total of $72,417,394.

=== Critical reception ===
On the review aggregator website Rotten Tomatoes, 48% of 98 critics' reviews are positive, with an average rating of 5.5/10. The website's consensus reads: "Moderately witty and acceptably acted, Diary of a Wimpy Kid 2 isn't much worse than the first installment." Metacritic, which uses a weighted average, assigned the film a score of 51 out of 100, based on 23 critics, indicating "mixed or average" reviews. Audiences polled by CinemaScore gave it an average grade of "A−" on an A+ to F scale.

Robert Abele of the Los Angeles Times gave the film a positive review saying, "Director David Bowers keeps things peppy and brightly lighted, but its swiftest pleasures come from moment-seizing cast members." Richard Roeper of the Chicago Sun-Times gave it a positive review saying, "A little less wimpy, gives value lessons to the watchers from the cast, and still pretty funny" and a B rating. Pete Hammond of Boxoffice magazine gave it a mixed review stating "Even better than the first edition, in its own sitcom-ish ways." However, Michael O'Sullivan of The Washington Post gave it a negative review, stating "You can't fault the filmmakers for reshaping a diary into a cohesive film. You can however, fault them for taking one of the great antiheroes in preteen literature and turning him into, well, an even wimpier kid."

=== Accolades ===
Year	Award	Category	Recipient	Result	Ref.
2012	Young Artist Award	Best Performance in a Feature Film - Leading Young Actor	Zachary Gordon	Nominated	
2012	Young Artist Award	Best Performance in a Feature Film - Supporting Young Actor	Karan Brar	Nominated	
2012	Young Artist Award	Best Performance in a Feature Film - Supporting Young Actor	Robert Capron	Nominated	
2012	Young Artist Award	Best Performance in a Feature Film - Supporting Young Actress	Laine MacNeil	Won	
2012	Young Artist Award	Best Performance in a Feature Film - Young Actor Ten and Under	Connor & Owen Fielding	Nominated	
2012	Young Artist Award	Best Performance in a Feature Film - Young Actor Ten and Under	Dalila Bela	Nominated	

== Sequel and animated adaptation ==
A sequel, titled Diary of a Wimpy Kid: Dog Days, was released on August 3, 2012. The film concluded the trilogy.

On October 23, 2021, Diary of a Wimpy Kid creator Jeff Kinney revealed that sequels to the 2021 animated Diary of a Wimpy Kid reboot film for Disney+ were in development. On Disney+ Day 2021, Kinney revealed that the first sequel, based on Rodrick Rules, was set to be released in 2022. The animated Diary of a Wimpy Kid: Rodrick Rules was released on December 2, 2022.
