= Madisen Beaty =

American actress

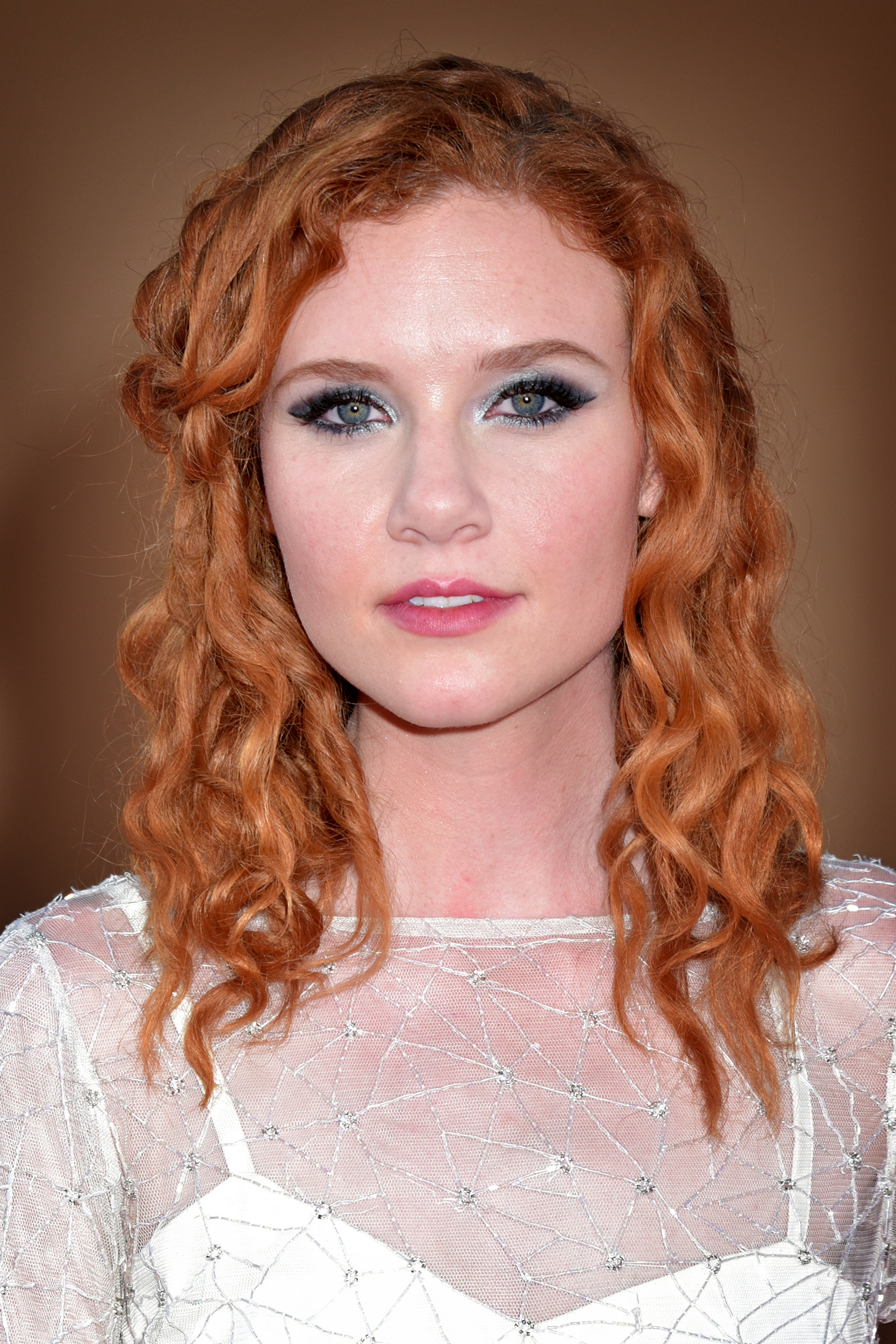
- Beaty in 2019
- Born: 1995 (age 30–31); Centennial, Colorado, U.S.
- Occupation: Actress
- Years active: 2006–present

Madisen Beaty (born 1995) is an American actress. She is known for her roles as Daisy Fuller in The Curious Case of Benjamin Button (2008), Doris Solstad in The Master (2012), Rebeccah Mulcahey in Other People (2016), Talya Banks in the ABC Family series The Fosters (2013–2018), Iris in The Magicians (2018–2019), and Patricia Krenwinkel in Aquarius (2015–16) and Once Upon a Time in Hollywood (2019).

== Life and career ==
Beaty was born in Centennial, Colorado. In 2008, she made her feature film debut portraying Daisy Fuller in the drama film The Curious Case of Benjamin Button. Beaty portrayed Sara Dougan in 2010 Lifetime movie The Pregnancy Pact, co-starring with Thora Birch. She then guest starred as Leslie in the iCarly episode "iWas a Pageant Girl", and as Kristin Haskell in the NCIS episode "Dead Air". For the latter appearance, she won the Young Artist Award for Best Performance in a TV Series – Guest Starring Young Actress.

In 2012, she appeared as Doris Solstad in The Master, a Paul Thomas Anderson film also starring Philip Seymour Hoffman, Joaquin Phoenix, and Amy Adams. In November 2015, it was announced that Beaty had been cast in a regular role for the second season of NBC's period drama series Aquarius, portraying Patricia Krenwinkel. In 2016, she starred alongside Chad Michael Murray and Luke Wilson in the Western thriller Outlaws and Angels. In 2018, she was cast as the goddess Iris in Syfy's series The Magicians. In 2019, Beaty played a different version of Krenwinkel in Quentin Tarantino's Once Upon a Time in Hollywood.

== Filmography ==
=== Film ===
Year	Title	Role	Notes
2006	Uncloseted Skeletons	Young Crista	Short film
2007	Steep	School Kid	Short film
2008	The Curious Case of Benjamin Button	Daisy Fuller (age 10)	
2010	The Five	Adilyne	
2010	Adalyn	Patricia	Short film
2012	RockBarnes: The Emperor in You	Wendy	
2012	The Master	Doris Solstad	
2014	Jamie Marks Is Dead	Frances Wilkinson	
2015	Share	Jenna	Short film
2016	Other People	Rebeccah	
2016	Outlaws and Angels	Charlotte Tildon	
2016	In the Radiant City	Beth Yurley	
2018	The Clovehitch Killer	Kassi	
2019	To The Stars	Clarissa Dell	
2019	Once Upon a Time in Hollywood	"Katie"	
2021	Seance	Bethany	
2023	Strange Darling	Gale	

=== Television ===
Year	Title	Role	Notes
2008	Family Man	Julie Becker	Television film
2010	iCarly	Leslie	Episode: "iWas a Pageant Girl"
2010	No Ordinary Family	Sara Berg	Episode: "No Ordinary Ring"
2010	The Pregnancy Pact	Sara Dougan	Television film
2010	NCIS	Kristin Haskell	Episode: "Dead Air"
2011	Miss Behave	Sam	6 episodes
2012	Beautiful People	Elizabeth	Television film
2016	Aquarius	Patricia Krenwinkel	10 episodes
2013–2018	The Fosters	Talya Banks	15 episodes
2018	Here and Now	Emma	2 episodes
2018–2019	The Magicians	Iris	
