= The Doozers =

2010s animated TV series

- Also known as: Jim Henson's Doozers
- Genre: Animated series
- Based on: Characters by Jim Henson
- Directed by: Larry Jacobs; Bill Gordon
- Voices of: David Berni; Trek Buccino; Millie Davis; Jacob Ewaniuk; Lisa Norton; Jenna Warren
- Opening theme: "Do-Do-Do-Doozers"
- Ending theme: "Do-Do-Do-Doozers" (instrumental)
- Composer: Eggplant (Note: A team of music composers consisting of Steve D'Angelo and Terry Tompkins)
- Countries of origin: Canada; United States
- Original language: English
- No. of seasons: 2
- No. of episodes: 72

Production
- Executive producers: Lisa Henson; Halle Stanford; Steven DeNure; Anne Loi
- Running time: 11 minutes
- Production companies: DHX Media Halifax (Note: As DHX/Doozers Productions Inc.); The Jim Henson Company

Original release
- Network: Cartoonito (pan European); Kids' CBC (Canada); Hulu (US)
- Release: April 25, 2014 – May 25, 2018

The Doozers is an animated television series that is a spin-off to Fraggle Rock. The series is co-produced by DHX Media and The Jim Henson Company, and was developed in association with the Canadian Broadcasting Corporation.

The series originally premiered in Australia on Nick Jr. on October 7, 2013. The series began its US run as a Hulu exclusive on April 25, 2014. Cartoonito and Boomerang also aired it within European countries and Africa, as well as Cartoon Network Asia. As of July 2025, the series is featured on the Yippee TV streaming service.

On September 12, 2017, it was renewed for a second and final season. It premiered on May 25, 2018.

== Premise ==
In the self-sustainable community of Doozer Creek located just beyond the view of humans, the show focuses on the Doozer Pod Squad (consisting of Daisy Wheel, Flex, Spike, and Mollybolt).

== Characters ==
=== Main ===
- Spike Doozer (voiced by Jacob Ewaniuk) is the member of the Pod Squad who pushes the other Pod Squad members into action. He is the son of Chief Doozer and the older brother of Daisy Wheel Doozer. He has a brown nose and brown hair and wears a blue hat, socks and wristbands.
- Molly Bolt Doozer (voiced by Jenna Warren) is a Pod Squad member who enjoys organizing events. She can also make lists, maps, and graphs. She has a purple nose and purple hair and wears a pink hat, socks and shirt.
- Flex Doozer (voiced by Trek Buccino in season 1 and Tyler Barish in season 2) lives on his grandparents' farm and uses his room as his workshop. Flex pilots the Pod Squad's vehicles. He has a yellow nose and yellow hair and wears an orange hat, socks and wristbands.
- Daisy Wheel Doozer (voiced by Millie Davis) is the youngest and smallest of the Doozer Pod Squad. She is the younger sister of Spike Doozer and the daughter of Chief Doozer. She has a blue nose and blue hair and wears a purple hat, socks and shirt.

=== Chief's family ===
- Chief Doozer (voiced by Heather Bambrick) is the Chief of Doozer Creek who is the mother of Spike Doozer and Daisy Wheel Doozer.

=== Architect's family ===
- Chief Architect Doozer is married to Baker and mother of Molly.
- Baker Timberbolt Doozer (voiced by David Berni) is the father of Molly Bolt Doozer and the husband of Chief Architect Doozer. He runs the bakery shop in Doozer Creek.
- Peg Bolt Doozer (voiced by Lisa Norton)

=== Others ===
- Doozer Doodad (voiced by David Berni) – Manager of the Doozer Creek supply depot, where the Pod Squad gets the supplies for their projects.
- Pinball Gimbal (voiced by Lisa Norton)
- Professor Gimbal wears glasses and has a purplish-white color in his nose and hair, wearing a light blue helmet. He manages the Doozarium, where the Pod Squad meet. He issues challenges, and makes suggestions, for various projects for the Pod Squad to complete.
- Baxter was advertised for the series but has not appeared yet. He had a brown nose and brown hair.

== Voice cast ==
- David Berni – Baker Timberbolt Doozer and Doozer Doodad
- Trek Buccino – Flex Doozer
- Tyler Barish - Flex Doozer
- Jaxon Mercey - Spike Doozer
- Millie Davis – Daisy Wheel Doozer
- Jacob Ewaniuk – Spike Doozer
- Lisa Norton as Peg Bolt and Pinball Gimbal
- Jenna Warren – Molly Bolt Doozer

The voice director is Merle Anne Ridley.

== Production ==
The series was produced by The Jim Henson Company with DHX Media (now WildBrain) for Kids' CBC and Hulu. The series was distributed by DHX Media, while Larry Jacobs and Bill Gordon served as the directors of the series. Executive producers includes Lisa Henson and Halle Stanford for The Jim Henson Company, Steven DeNure and Anne Loi for DHX Media. Other staff for the series includes Philip Stamp as supervising producer and Craig Martin as executive story editor.

The series was presented for sale at television industry conference MIPTV in 2009. A March 2009 press announcement stated that test animation was being made, with the series to comprise 52 eleven-minute episodes (or 26 half-hour broadcast episodes). Production was originally planned for fall of 2009 with release estimated for fall 2010; however production was delayed as the Henson Company continued to seek out broadcasters.

== Episodes ==
=== Season 1 ===
1. "Project Radish-A-Pult" – A gust of wind knocks a large branch onto a bridge in Doozer Creek, blocking the path and halting construction of a new wind turbine.
2. "Pod Squad Boogey" – The Pod Squad is performing in the Starlight Concert, but when they hear other Doozers singing, the group decides they need to do something to stand out.
3. "Jetpack Away" – When Daisy Wheel's jetpack goes on the fritz, Flex volunteers to fix it. But he makes it so fast that it flies out of her reach and all over Doozer Creek.
4. "Follow Your Nose" – After a huge order at the bakery is cancelled, Molly's Dad, Baker Timberbolt, is left with 100 extra Smackleberry muffins. The Pod Squad run all over town trying to get rid of the muffins.
5. "Bubbles" – The Pod Squad invents the Cleanamajigger, the ultimate cleaning machine that's a combination vacuum/floor polisher/bubble sprayer and scrubber.
6. "Mega Magnet Mover" – Flex is making a clock for his Grandpa's birthday. But as he goes to put the finishing touches on his design, he realizes he's lost his Doodriver.
7. "Zip It" – Spike is interrupted in the middle of finishing his new zip line outside the Doozerium when the Pod Squad needs to go help out at the Peach Harvest.
8. "Green Thumbs" – Inspired by Professor Gimbal, the Doozers learn to build a garden that goes up, instead of out, and now there's plenty of room for all the plants.
9. "Be Leaf It" – The Fall Foliage Festival was a success, but now the Pod Squad needs to figure out what to do with all the spare leaves they've collected.
10. "Spookypalooza" – It's Spookypalooza! The Pod Squad makes the spookiest pumpkin ever by stacking three pumpkins together.
11. "An Itch You Can't Scratch" – Professor Gimbal is getting rid of some of his old inventions, but he's bummed that he has to throw them out. That's when the Pod Squad decides to re-purpose them in a whole new way.
12. "Doozer Derby" – Doozer Creek is hosting the Doozer Derby, a design-your-own Doozer Derby Cart race. The Pod Squad want to enter but they can't settle on one design.
13. "Dancing Doodad" – There's a big dance tonight in Doozer Creek and every Doozer will be there....every Doozer but Doozer Doodad, that is.
14. "A Doozer of a Dippleplant" – With the help of Flex's grandpa, the Pod Squad is on track to grow the largest dippleplant in Doozer history!
15. "Home Tweet Home" – Molly's house has a new tenant....a bird! Working together, the Pod Squad designs the ultimate home for their new friend, but soon realize that maybe a 'Doozer' house isn't what the bird had in mind.
16. "Doozers Amusers" – The Pod Squad is thrilled when Professor Gimbal introduces them to his new baby nephew, Pinball. There's just one problem – the baby won't laugh or even smile!
17. "Safe from Sound" – At home, Spike and Daisy Wheel are startled by a horrible screeching sound – and it's coming from inside the house! It's their mom, learning a new instrument called the Doozeedoo!
18. "A Sticky Situation" – The Pod Squad is busy working away at a new playground in Doozer Creek when Professor Gimbal slips on the bridge and gets stuck in a termite mound fort!
19. "Gift for Gimbal" – The Pod Squad want to get Professor Gimbal a gift, but what do you give the Doozer that has everything? Playing detective, they follow him around Doozer Creek, collecting clues about what he might like.
20. "Catch a Ride" – Everyone in the Pod Squad has their own vehicle except Molly. After trying out her friends' rides, the group decide to create a custom vehicle made especially for her.
21. "Little Feats" – Being the smallest, Daisy Wheel has to make two trips to carry as much as the bigger kids, but she doesn't mind because that mean more time to explore the world around her.
22. "Flex Art" – There's an art festival in Doozer Creek and every Doozer is busy creating their own masterpiece....everyone except Flex. He's more of an inventor than an artist, and he's totally stumped. With a little help from Doozer Deidra, the town artist, Flex learns that art can be anything and gets busy building his own unique piece de resistance.
23. "Butterfly Away" – The monarch butterflies are making their annual migration through Doozer Creek when Daisy Wheel notices a single butterfly still lingering in town. The Pod Squad decides to help get the butterfly back to the others without scaring it away.
24. "The Legend of Doozer Creek" – It's a big Pod Squad sleepover at Molly's house! The gang wants to hear a spooky story! Baker Timber Bolt obliges, reading a classic: The Legend of Doozer Creek. It's how Spookypalooza came to be celebrated in Doozer Creek!
25. "Mystery Box" – Professor Gimbal gives the Pod Squad a curious present-a Mystery Box with a surprise inside. Now they just have to figure out how to open this strange-looking box!
26. "Detective Doozers" – Professor Gimbal is tired and frustrated. He can't figure out how to finish his latest invention. To make matters worse, his old inventions are going missing. The Pod Squad volunteer to figure out what happened to the missing items and become ...The Detective Squad! They soon discover Professor Gimbal has been stealing....in his sleep!
27. "Up, Up and Away"
28. "Hiccup-a-Majig"
29. "Cake Walk" – Molly and her Mom and Dad made a huge cake for a contest but the cake carrier is too small. So it's up to The Pod Squad to build a cake carrier that will be easy to carry to the contest.
30. "The Eggcellent"
31. "Pod Ball"
32. "Enter the Ditzies"
33. "Doozermahoozit"
34. "Trouble Below"
35. "Daisy Wheel on Ice" – Daisy Wheel is tired of falling on the ice when she's trying to learn how to skate. So The Pod Squad build Daisy a Doo-Step Skating Dress that will keep her from falling down.
36. "The Gingerbread House" – The Pod Squad want to build a giant gingerbread house that they can all fit inside. But how can they build it if it keeps falling to pieces?
37. "Mapping Quest"
38. "Dune Buddies"
39. "Big Stars"
40. "Light Where It's Dark"
41. "The Pod Squad Pavilion"
42. "Doozers on Parade"
43. "Doozers Re-Users"
44. "It's a Breeze"
45. "Three's a Team"
46. "Sky High Doozers"
47. "A Windy Wonder"
48. "Short Order Doozers" – After Molly's dad is having a hard time by giving every single Doozer a sandwich, She and The Pod Squad try to figure out a faster way to give everybody their sandwich.
49. "The Blue Beaker"
50. "Picture Perfect"
51. "In a Fog"
52. "Starry Night"

=== Season 2 ===
1. "Dirty Driving Doozers"
2. "Gift-spiration"
3. "Key Ingredients"
4. "Doozers Unplugged"
5. "Blue Beaker Sneaker"
6. "Dandelion Dilemma"
7. "Get Creative"
8. "Crash Test Doozers"
9. "Danger in Doozer Creek"
10. "The Rainbow Connection"
11. "Cocoon Season"
12. "If It Falls"
13. "Stage Plight"
14. "Oh BeeHive"
15. "Doosquatch"
16. "Level Up"
17. "Holed Up"
18. "In a Jam"
19. "Doocathlon"
20. "Sand Sliders"
