= Witchslayer Gretl =

2012 American-Canadian dark fantasy television film

- DVD released by Sony Pictures Home Entertainment
- Also known as: Gretl; Gretl: Witch Hunter
- Genre: Dark fantasy
- Inspired by: Hansel and Gretel by Brothers Grimm
- Screenplay by: Brook Durham
- Story by: Angela Mancuso
- Directed by: Mario Philip Azzopardi
- Starring: Paul McGillion; Shannen Doherty
- Composer: Stacey Hersh
- Countries of origin: Canada; United States
- Original language: English

Production
- Executive producers: Angela Mancuso; Lewis Chesler; David Perlmutter
- Producer: Robert Vaughn
- Cinematography: Russ Goozee
- Editor: Marvin Lawrence
- Running time: 87 minutes
- Production companies: Chesler/Perlmutter Productions; Shaw Media; Sony Pictures Television; Syfy; Vesuvius Productions

Original release
- Network: Syfy
- Release: February 25, 2012

Witchslayer Gretl (also known as Gretl and Gretl: Witch Hunter) is a 2012 American-Canadian dark fantasy television film written by Brook Durham and Angela Mancuso, and directed by Mario Philip Azzopardi. Inspired by the Brothers Grimm fairy tale Hansel and Gretel, it stars Paul McGillion as Hansel, a witch hunter who comes into conflict with his witch-possessed sister, Gretl, played Shannen Doherty. It was one of several similarly-themed Hansel and Gretel films (such as Hansel and Gretel and Hansel & Gretel: Warriors of Witchcraft) that were made in an attempt to "cash-in" on the 2013 film Hansel & Gretel: Witch Hunters.

== Plot ==
While lost in the Black Forest, siblings Hansel and Gretl are ambushed by Zhore, a witch who tries to kidnap Gretl and murder Hansel. Zhore's spell bounces off of the magic-resistant Hansel and immolates her, so she switches bodies with Gretl before entombing her and setting out to become the Witch Queen. Zhore has her warlock henchman, Abyss, and her gargoyle familiar abduct young witches, who Zhore magically binds to herself, turning the girls into near-mindless members of Zhore's Coven of the Crescent Moon. One of the witches, Lara, is more willful than the others, breaking the binding spell and escaping Zhore. A powerless and amnesiac Lara is found by Hansel, who had become a witch hunter to avenge Gretl. Lara uses her retained knowledge of the occult to construct powerful anti-witch armaments for Hansel.

Hansel and Lara interrogate and kill a witch, learning from her that the Witch Queen's next target is a girl named Ehren. Abyss kills Ehren's father and kidnaps her, but before he can bind her to Zhore, she is rescued by Hansel. Lara convinces Hansel that they can train Ehren to help them fight the Witch Queen. It is revealed that Zhore wants Ehren because the girl's raw magical power makes her a suitable replacement for Gretl, whose body is no longer able to sustain Zhore. Abyss tries to make up for his failure to capture Ehren by bringing Zhore another potential vessel, who an agitated Zhore disintegrates before torturing Abyss.

Zhore's gargoyle captures Hansel and brings him to Zhore. Zhore offers Hansel a restored Gretl in exchange for Ehren, and when Hansel rebuffs her, orders that he be burned by Abyss. Fearing for his life and wanting to overthrow Zhore, Abyss instead frees Hansel and tells him where to find Gretl after informing him that destroying Zhore's original body will restore Gretl and kill Zhore. Hansel and Ehren evade the gargoyle and unearth Gretl. Hansel stabs Gretl in an attempt to kill Zhore's body, but all this does is cause another body swap between Gretl and Zhore. Zhore jumps from her original body to Ehren, but before she can take full control of Ehren's body, Ehren is mercy killed by Hansel, who then slays the gargoyle with help from Gretl. Lara rejects Abyss's declaration of love and offer of partnership and kills him, thus disbanding the Coven of the Crescent Moon.

Zhore, having become trapped in her mangled original body, is eventually tracked down and strung up by Hansel, Gretl, and Lara. As Lara prepares to kill Zhore, she is stopped by Gretl, who pities Zhore. Zhore breaks free and, mocking Gretl for her mercy, tries to attack her, only to be killed by Hansel.

== Cast ==
- Paul McGillion as Hansel
- Emilie Ullerup as Ehren
- Shannen Doherty as Gretl
- Sarain Boylan as Lara
- Jefferson Brown as Abyss
- Nahanni Johnstone as Thorne
- Frank J. Zupancic as Ehren's Father
- Daniela Lazzaro as Newborn Witch
- Maxwell Uretsky as Young Hansel
- Sophia Ewaniuk as Young Gretl
- Anne Shepherd as Zhore
- Erica Cox as Lead Witch
- Clara Pasieka as Young Maiden #2
- Marianthi Evans as Woman
- John Boylan as Lara's Father
- Elizabeth Harpur as Lara's Mother
- Gene Arsenault as Newborn Witch's Brother
- Remy Busetto as Newborn Witch's Father

== Release ==
The film was set to premiere on Syfy in November 2011 under the name Gretl, but was pushed back to February 25, 2012 after being retitled Witchslayer Gretl. It aired as part of a double feature with another Syfy film titled Black Forest. It was released on DVD in June, 2012 by Sony Pictures Home Entertainment.

== Reception ==
Dread Central's Scott Foy condemned Witchslayer Gretl, giving it a score of 1/5 and writing, "Syfy movies, in general, are rarely ever good, but at least some of them manage to be enjoyably schlocky or unintentionally hilarious. And then there are the ones like Witchslayer Gretl that is the equivalent of cinematic Ambien. Even when there was action and magic and monsters on the screen, so little of it held my interest my senses dulled and my thoughts drifted elsewhere. Fairy tales are traditionally read to little kids before bedtime. This fairy tale even made this adult feel ready for night-night." Adrian Halen of Horror News was similarly derisive of the film, writing, "Yet another concept that could have been really, really cool was thrown into the studio executive shredder and said shredder shat out this movie. ION Channel movie-of-the-week-style acting over insipid dialogue that alters back and forth between what would actually fit with the times and something from a modern horror flick, ridiculous plot holes big enough to fly the Millennium Falcon through, and the biggest sin of all to this Charmed (that’s right, I said Charmed) fan – underutilizing Shannen Doherty." The Movie Scene's Andy Webb awarded the film a score of 2/5, commending its interesting plot while criticizing every other aspect of it, including "the less than effective special effects, in some places the painfully wrong casting, uninteresting dialogue as well as less than exciting action." David Hinckley of the New York Daily News had a more middling response to Witchslayer Gretl, writing, "Between the effects and the language, the whole movie has a sort of wooden feel, and there isn't much the actors can do about it. This is more acceptable in a sci-fi flick than in a rom-com, though, and fans may find the story intriguing enough to go along for the ride."

== See also ==
- List of films about witchcraft
- List of Sci Fi Pictures original films
- Mockbuster
