= Sophia Ewaniuk =

Canadian actress

- Born: Sophia Frances Ewaniuk; May 10, 2002 (age 24); Canada
- Occupation: Actress
- Years active: 2010–present
- Known for: Happy Town; Flashpoint
- Awards: 2 Young Artist Award nominations

Sophia Ewaniuk (/iːˈwɒnɪk/; born May 10, 2002) is a Canadian actress who landed her first major role as Emma Conroy in ABC's series Happy Town, a role for which she had been nominated as a recurring lead in a television series at the 2011 Young Artist Awards.

Previously, Sophia had appeared as Riley Adler on CTV’s drama Flashpoint in the season 3 episode "Severed Ties", which earned her a Young Artist Award nomination as a guest star in a television series. She has also appeared in the USA Network series Covert Affairs in the episode "The Outsiders".

Sophia has appeared as Young Gretl in the movie Witchslayer Gretl, an original Sci Fi Channel movie starring Shannen Doherty. She voiced the twins, Ada and Ida, in the TVOKids/Disney Junior animated series Ella the Elephant.

Ewaniuk's older brother Jacob is also a child actor.

== Filmography ==
Year	Title	Role	Notes
2010	Happy Town	Emma Conroy	7 episodes
2010	Flashpoint	Riley Adler	1 episode
2010	Sundays at Tiffany's	Principal (uncredited)	TV movie
2010	Ninety-one	Young Cate	Short film
2011	Covert Affairs	Roma Young Girl	1 episode
2011–2014	Monday Report	Rick's Daughter	3 episodes
2012	Witchslayer Gretl	Young Gretl	TV movie
2012–2013	Ella the Elephant	Ada and Ida (voice role)	
2013	BeyWarriors: BeyRaiderz	Holly (voice role)	1 episode

== Awards and nominations ==
- 2011: nominated for Young Artist Award in the category "Best Performance in a TV Series - Guest Starring Young Actress Ten and Under" for her role as Riley Adler in Flashpoint
- 2011: nominated for Young Artist Award in the category "Best Performance in a TV Series - Recurring Young Actress Ten and Under" for her role as Emma Conroy in Happy Town
