= Austin MacDonald =

Canadian actor

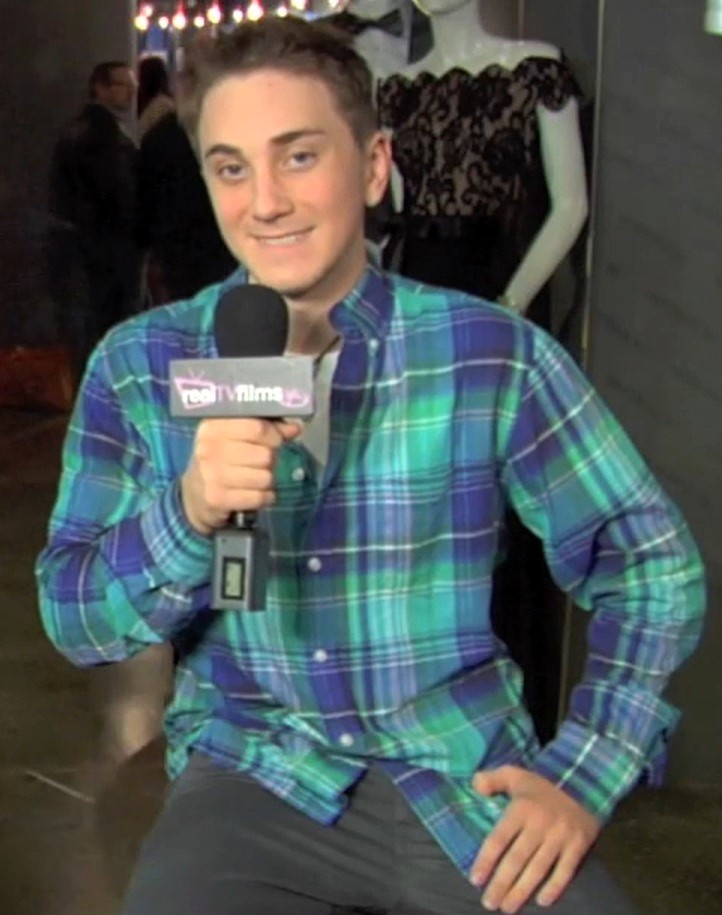
- MacDonald at the 2013 Toronto International Film Festival
- Born: July 17, 1995 (age 30); Mississauga, Ontario, Canada
- Occupation: Actor
- Years active: 2004–present
- Website: www.austinmacdonald.com

Austin MacDonald (born July 17, 1995) is a Canadian actor, best known for his role as Roger in 2008 film Kit Kittredge: An American Girl and as Andy in the Roxy Hunter film series. In 2013, he won the Young Artist Award for Best Supporting Actor in a Feature Film for his role as Brian in Jesus Henry Christ.

== Filmography ==
Year	Film/Show	Role	Notes
2004	The West Wing	Boy	Episode: "The Warfare of Genghis Khan"
2004	The Kid's Table	Corey	
2005	The Prize Winner of Defiance, Ohio	Dortha Shaffer's son	
2005	Darcy's Wild Life	Boy	Episode: "Pet Adoption Day"
2006	Banana Bruises	Young Matthew	
2005–2006	The Doodlebops	Streeter	6 episodes
2006	ReGenesis	Student	2 episodes
2006	Naturally, Sadie	kid	Episode: "The Bennett Club"
2007	Souvenirs from Asia	Corey	
2007	Jack Brooks: Monster Slayer	Young Howard	
2007	Roxy Hunter and the Mystery of the Moody Ghost	Andy	
2008	Roxy Hunter and the Myth of the Mermaid	Andy	
2008	M.V.P.	Austin	Episode: "Truth and Consequence"
2008	Roxy Hunter and the Secret of the Shaman	Andy	
2008	Céline	Bully	TV film
2008	Kit Kittredge: An American Girl	Roger	
2008	Roxy Hunter and the Horrific Halloween	Andy	
2009	Rick Mercer Report	Austin	1 episode
2009	The Ron James Show	Stevie James	Episode: "New Year's Eve Edition"
2009–2010	Little Mosque on the Prairie	Zach Whitman	2 episodes
2010	Living in Your Car	Scott	
2011	Debra!	Auzzie	TV series
2011–2013	Life with Boys	Andy Jacobs	TV series; Recurring role
2012	Jesus Henry Christ	Brian the Bully	Young Artists Award (see below)
2013	Hannibal	C. J. Lincoln	Episode: "Œuf"
2013	He Never Died	Teenager #1	Feature Film

== Accolades ==
Year	Award	Category	Result	Work	Ref.
2009	Young Artist Awards	Best Performance in a Feature Film - Supporting Young Actor	Nominated	Kit Kittredge: An American Girl	
2009	Young Artist Awards	Best Performance in a Feature Film - Young Ensemble Cast	Won	Kit Kittredge: An American Girl	
2010	Young Artist Awards	Best Performance in a TV Series - Guest Starring Young Actor 13 and Under	Nominated	Rick Mercer Report	
2012	Young Artist Awards	Best Performance in a TV Series - Supporting Young Actor	Nominated	Debra!	
2012	Young Artist Awards	Best Performance in a TV Series - Recurring Young Actor	Nominated	Living in Your Car	
2012	Young Artist Awards	Outstanding Young Ensemble In a TV Series	Won	Debra!	
2013	Young Artist Awards	Best Performance in a Feature Film - Supporting Young Actor	Won	Jesus Henry Christ	
2013	Young Artist Awards	Best Performance in a TV Series - Supporting Young Actor	Nominated	Debra!	
2013	Young Artist Awards	Best Performance in a TV Series - Recurring Young Actor 17–21	Nominated	Life with Boys	
2014	Young Artist Awards	Best Performance in a Short Film - Young Actor 16–21	Nominated	Portrait of Ryan	
2014	Young Artist Awards	Best Performance in a TV Series - Recurring Young Actor 17–21	Nominated	Life with Boys	
