= Debra! =

Canadian live-action sitcom

- Genre: Comedy; Sitcom
- Created by: Andrew Nicholls and Darrell Vickers
- Directed by: Stacey Stewart Curtis; Andrew Young
- Starring: Niamh Wilson; Will Jester; Austin MacDonald; Alicia Josipovic; James Coholan
- Opening theme: "Decidedly Debra!" performed by jACK (Craig McConnell and Chad Richardson)
- Ending theme: "Decidedly Debra!"
- Country of origin: Canada
- Original language: English
- No. of seasons: 1
- No. of episodes: 13

Production
- Executive producers: Andrew Nicholls; Darrell Vickers; Stacey Stewart Curtis; Michael Hirsh; Toper Taylor; Tom Mazza; Maggie Murphy
- Producers: Kevin May; Dan Danko; Tom K. Mason
- Editors: Peter F. Light, CCE
- Camera setup: Film; Single-camera
- Running time: 22 minutes
- Production company: Cookie Jar Entertainment

Original release
- Network: Family Channel
- Release: June 4, 2011 – January 1, 2012

Debra! (originally Decidedly Debra!) is a Canadian live-action sitcom that focuses on 14-year-old Debra Delong, who wants to make her own company and wants to run it with a boy named Preston Lunford. The series was created by Andrew Nicholls and Darrell Vickers, and produced by Cookie Jar Group. Debra! is executive-produced by Stacey Stewart Curtis, and produced by Kevin May. The series premiered on June 4, 2011 and was declared cancelled on January 1, 2012.

== Characters ==
- Deborah "Debra" Carnegie Cameron Delong (portrayed by Niamh Wilson) – Debra is a perky 14-year-old girl who wants to create her own company and improve the world.
- Preston Lunford (portrayed by Will Jester) – Preston is a smart and quiet guy, who is a musician, guitarist, and also a magician. He is in his own band, and ends up hanging with Debra (even when he doesn't want to).
- Auzzie Pilditch (portrayed by Austin MacDonald) – Auzzie thinks he is the world's gift to girls and often tries to get everyone to think he is special. He is a member of Preston's band.
- Brud Branson (portrayed by James Coholan) – Brud is of a good nature. He and Auzzie are close friends. He plays the drums for he, Preston and Auzzie's band FLOORdeVOTED.
- Dancy Cologne (portrayed by Alicia Josipovic) – Dancy was originally Debra's best friend, but not anymore. She's Debra's worst enemy and is the high school's "Queenager."

== Episodes ==
No.	Title	Original release date	Prod. code
1	"Introducing Debra!"	June 4, 2011	101
Debra meets Preston at her new school and tries to make friends with him, but Preston thinks she's missing a couple parts up there, so to prove her friendship, Debra offers to share her company, The Magical Flying Pony, with him. But Preston refuses and so instead Debra decided to help him in the talent show with his magical act by adding Dancy and the principal. Meanwhile Debra tries to prove herself to Dancy that she is just as "terrific" as she is. Note: In Canada, this episode aired on April 22, 2011 as a special preview.
2	"Graduating Fenufsky"	June 5, 2011	102
Debra helps a hard-working high school senior by helping him gain his last requirement to graduate, wrestling.
3	"Cannon Have Your Cake"	June 10, 2011	108
Debra wants to do something great for a town holiday, so she wants to shoot Preston out of a cannon.
4	"Project Josie"	June 19, 2011	111
Debra helps tough female jock Jo "The Slammer" Briggs soften her image.
5	"Chez Camfield"	June 26, 2011	104
Debra sneaks her own strange recipes onto the school menu.
6	"Let's Party"	July 3, 2011	112
Debra tries to get Preston the perfect gift for his birthday.
7	"Designing Auzzie"	July 10, 2011	109
Debra and Preston give Auzzie a makeover.
8	"Operation Dancy"	July 22, 2011	106
Debra goes to great lengths to help a spurned Dancy mend her broken heart.
9	"Teen Capsule"	July 29, 2011	107
Debra enlists Preston's help to make and bury a teen time capsule.
10	"Drum and Drummer"	August 19, 2011	113
Debra sets up a gig for Preston's band, but Brud is stricken with 'drummer's block.'
11	"My Dinner with Dancy"	September 4, 2011	105
To Debra's chagrin, Preston wins a dinner date with Dancy Cologne.
12	"Lung Trumpet"	September 18, 2011	103
Debra hatches a plan to rekindle the romance between Preston's parents when she thinks they're splitting up.
13	"Spelling Bee Rematch"	January 1, 2012	110
Debra is stricken with stage fright when Dancy challenges her to a spelling bee rematch.

== Accolades ==
Year	Award	Category	Recipient	Result	Ref.
2013	Young Artist Award	Best Performance in a TV Series – Supporting Young Actor	Austin MacDonald	Nominated	

== International broadcast ==
Country / region	Channel	Premiere	Title	Timeslot
Canada	Family	April 22, 2011 (Preview); June 4, 2011 (Official)	Debra!	Weekends at 4:00pm (Eastern) (June 2011 – November 2011); Sundays at 6:30pm (Eastern); Daily at 1:00am (Eastern)
Israel	Arutz HaYeladim	September 20, 2011	דברה (Debra)	Sunday–Thursday at 11:00pm
Turkey	Kidz TV	March 10, 2012	Debra!	Saturday - Sunday 14:30 - 19:30 repeats Monday to Friday 14:30 - 19:30
Mexico	Canal Puntos	March 12, 2016	Debra!	Sunday-Thursday at 6:00am
