= Love Bites (TV series) =

American television series

- Genre: Comedy drama; Romantic comedy; Anthology
- Created by: Cindy Chupack
- Written by: Cindy Chupack
- Starring: Becki Newton; Greg Grunberg; Constance Zimmer
- Theme music composer: Chrissie Hynde
- Opening theme: "Message of Love", performed by Emily Zuzik and Art Hays
- Composer: Danny Lux
- Country of origin: United States
- Original language: English
- No. of seasons: 1
- No. of episodes: 8 + original pilot

Production
- Executive producers: Cindy Chupack; Marc Buckland; Eric Fellner; Tim Bevan; Shelley McCrory; Jon Kinnally; Tracy Poust
- Running time: 60 minutes
- Production companies: Loud Blouse Productions; Working Title Television; Universal Media Studios; Open 4 Business Productions

Original release
- Network: NBC
- Release: June 2 – July 21, 2011

Love Bites is an American anthology comedy-drama television series originally planned for the 2010–11 television season on the NBC network that eventually aired as a summer replacement series. It premiered in its regular Thursday night time slot at 10:00 pm Eastern/9:00 pm Central, on June 2, 2011. On July 11, 2011, NBC canceled the show and the series finale aired on July 21, 2011.

== Plot ==
Love Bites was originally set to focus on "optimistic, bubbly social worker" Annie (Becki Newton) and "sarcastic career bridesmaid" Frannie (Jordana Spiro), two single women exploring modern stories of dating, marriage, love, and sex, while dealing with their other married friends.

Due to off-camera complications, the show was retooled as an anthology series focusing on multiple vignettes per episode. Each story was loosely connected by common themes or romantically-challenged characters related to the pilot's three main protagonists: Annie (Becki Newton), Judd (Greg Grunberg), and Colleen (Constance Zimmer/Pamela Adlon).

== Cast and characters ==
=== Main ===
- Becki Newton as Annie Matopoulos, A single woman who is Frannie's best friend.
- Greg Grunberg as Judd Rouscher, Colleen's love interest.
- Constance Zimmer as Colleen Rouscher, Judd's love interest.

=== Guest ===
- Krysten Ritter as Cassie
- Lindsay Price as Liz
- Kyle Howard as Carter
- Steve Howey as Kell
- Craig Robinson as Bowman
- Michelle Trachtenberg as Jodie
- Jennifer Love Hewitt as herself
- Krista Allen as Janine
- Spencer Locke as Christy Hayes
- Vincent Martella as Josh Ford
- Abigail Mavity as Kit
- Moises Arias as Jeff
- Austin Rogers as Roddy
- Emily Rutherfurd as Julia Clark
- Izabella Miko as Audrey
- Christopher Gorham as Dale
- Jeffrey Tambor as Dr. O
- Bret Harrison as Charlie
- Beau Bridges as Hal Sacovitch
- Frances Conroy as Faye Strathmore
- Kurtwood Smith as Ed Strathmore
- Laura Prepon as Alex
- Jim Beaver as Trucker
- Keegan-Michael Key as Andrew
- Ayda Field as Sapphire
- Merle Dandridge as Krista
- Audra Griffis as Jenny the Barista
- Steve Talley as Dan Sullivan
- Donald Faison as Ricky
- Joy Bryant as Angie
- Jessica St. Clair as Chloe
- Guillermo Díaz as Luis
- Matt Long as Matt
- Matt Winston as Matt Two
- Isaiah Mustafa as Craig
- Ken Jeong as Takashi
- Eddie McClintock as Scott
- Anna Camp as Prudence
- James Roday as Jeff
- Ashley Williams as Bridget
- Cheryl Hines as Kristen Lerner (aka Mrs. Waltham)
- Vanessa Marano as Becky, Kristen's older daughter
- Jay Harrington as Brian, Bridget's brother
- Madison Leisle as Emma, Brian's daughter
- G Hannelius as Maddy Tinelli, Kristen's younger daughter
- Riki Lindhome as Alexis
- Jaime King as Amanda
- Ben Feldman as Sam
- Adam Baldwin
- Ashley Palmer as Kelly
- David Giuntoli as Jordan
- Skylar Astin as Ben
- Rebecca Creskoff as Marissa
- Pamela Adlon as Colleen Rouscher (pilot)
- Kathy Kinney as Karen

== Episodes ==
| No. | Title | Directed by | Written by | Original release date | U.S. viewers (millions) |
|---|---|---|---|---|---|
| 0 | "Pilot" | Marc Buckland | Cindy Chupack | Unaired | N/A |
Annie and Frannie are the last two single girls standing after all of their friends get married.
| 1 | "Firsts" | Marc Buckland | Cindy Chupack | June 2, 2011 | 2.64 |
Annie's friend Cassie lies that she is a virgin to attract a guy. Judd and his friend are on a flight with Jennifer Love Hewitt. After being fired from his job, Carter returns to his home only to find that his fiance is having fun with a vibrator.
| 2 | "How To..." | Wendey Stanzler ("Banana Bread", "Decent Proposal"); Marc Buckland ("Eyegasms") | Colleen McGuinness ("Banana Bread", "Decent Proposal"); Danielle Sanchez-Witzel & Larry Wilmore ("Eyegasms") | June 9, 2011 | 2.37 |
When Annie's friend Jodie bakes a banana bread for her new flame Charlie, he feels threatened and tells her they should just be friends. Ed and Faye Strathmore visit their son Kyle and his boyfriend in Venice. Judd and Colleen admit who they fantasize about.
| 3 | "Keep on Truckin'" | John Scott ("Goodbye Boob", "Cutlets"); Marc Buckland ("Ninja Vanish") | Tracy Poust & Jon Kinnally & David Feeney ("Goodbye Boob", "Cutlets"); Larry Wilmore & Danielle Sanchez-Witzel ("Ninja Vanish") | June 16, 2011 | 2.34 |
Judd and a friend drop in on a party and discover a surprise about its host. Annie's sister Chloe sets up a blind date for her. Ricky shows his tricks in vanishing from one-night stands.
| 4 | "Sky High" | Timothy Busfield | Joe Lawson | June 23, 2011 | 2.03 |
When Annie's niece, Christy asks a shy teenager to go with her to the prom, everybody tries to advise him. Judd and Colleen are trying marijuana when they realize that they have to attend a Christening.
| 5 | "Stand and Deliver" | John David Coles | David McHugh & Matt Flanagan | June 30, 2011 | 1.87 |
Judd and Colleen are looking to buy a new house. Sam learns that his ex girlfriend is dating a baseball star. Julia must decide between her career and her personal life.
| 6 | "TMI" | John Scott | Colleen McGuinness | July 7, 2011 | 1.98 |
"Fetishes": Bridget reveals her uniform fetish to Jeff, who explores his fetishes. "Becky's Situation": Judd takes his niece Becky to the STD clinic. "Creepy Dad": Kristen dates Brian, a socially inept man. After being burned for sending an inappropriate reply-all email, Brian commiserates with Bridget, leading to an apology at the group parents-teacher meeting.
| 7 | "Boys to Men" | Jamie Babbit | Danielle Sanchez-Witzel & Joe Lawson | July 14, 2011 | 2.00 |
Dale works out his baby jitters with a hot French receptionist, and a cougar mends the heart of Colleen's young nephew.
| 8 | "Modern Plagues" | Anton Cropper | Cindy Chupack | July 21, 2011 | 1.80 |
Bedbugs infest Jodie and Charlie, and a musical flash mob proposal reveals Matt's true romantic feelings for Annie.

== Development and production ==
In January 2010, NBC announced Love Bites as one of many pilots on its early development slate. Becki Newton was cast in late February, followed quickly by Jordana Spiro. Marc Buckland was confirmed to be directing the pilot in early March. In May 2010, NBC announced it had green-lit the series. The series was scheduled to air on Thursday nights in the 10–11 pm slot starting in the fall of 2010. On May 17, 2010, Greg Grunberg announced via Twitter that he will be joining the cast.

A number of changes eventually prevented the series from going into production as planned. On June 24, 2010, Spiro left the series after 3 episodes due to her contracted role on My Boys. Krysten Ritter guest starred in the pilot episode as Cassie, replacing Spiro. Due to Newton's announced pregnancy, her character, a virgin, was reimagined, and prior to production, showrunner Cindy Chupack voluntarily reduced her role to writer, citing personal reasons. NBC moved Love Bites to midseason 2010–11 and moved The Apprentice to fall 2010 to take the timeslot. Pamela Adlon was originally cast as Colleen in the unaired pilot and was replaced by Constance Zimmer in the subsequent aired episodes. In July 2010, Ink UMS announced that Tracy Poust and Jon Kinnally would serve as writing showrunners for the series.

On December 9, 2010, Deadline Hollywood reported that NBC had cut back the episode order from 13 to 9 episodes. NBC's subsequent cancellation for the cult series led to new pilot choices by Spiro at Lost and Found, Newton at an untitled Jackie and Jeff Filgo CBS pilot and Grunberg landing at Big Mike.

After numerous delays, NBC announced that the 9 completed episodes were to premiere on June 2, 2011.
