= Happy Town (TV series) =

- Promotional poster
- Genre: Mystery; Drama
- Created by: Josh Appelbaum; Andre Nemec; Scott Rosenberg
- Starring: Geoff Stults; Lauren German; Amy Acker; Robert Ray Wisdom; Sarah Gadon; Jay Paulson; Ben Schnetzer; Steven Weber; Sam Neill
- Composer: Stephen Endelman
- Country of origin: United States
- Original language: English
- No. of seasons: 1
- No. of episodes: 8 (2 aired online)

Production
- Executive producers: Josh Appelbaum; Andre Nemec; Scott Rosenberg; Gary Fleder
- Producer: Michael J. Maschio
- Production locations: Port Hope, Ontario; Port Perry, Ontario; Toronto, Ontario
- Running time: 45 minutes
- Production companies: ABC Studios; Space Floor Television

Original release
- Network: ABC
- Release: April 28 – July 1, 2010

Happy Town is an American drama television series that premiered on ABC on Wednesday, April 28, 2010, and ended on June 16, 2010. It was created by Josh Appelbaum, Andre Nemec, and Scott Rosenberg. It had a total of eight episodes, but only six were broadcast on ABC. The remaining two, "Dallas Alice Doesn't Live Here Anymore" and the series finale, "Blame It on Rio Bravo", were available for viewing only at the network's website on July 1, 2010.

== Plot ==
A period of peace following a series of unsolved kidnappings is cut short when a new crime has everyone talking in the small Minnesota town of Haplin. The townsfolk are convinced the crimes are committed by the so-called "Magic Man", a person whom character Merritt Grieves describes as having "an ability to make people disappear that bordered on the mystical". Seven people have vanished, never to be heard from again.

As the series progresses, it seems evident that the disappearances are related to an old German film titled Die Blaue Tür (The Blue Door).

== Background ==
Although the series is set in Minnesota, many of its scenes were filmed in Canadian communities such as Port Hope, Penetanguishene, St. Catharines and Brampton, all in Ontario. Several of the street level shots were filmed in Newnan, GA.

After shooting the pilot episode, actor Ben Schnetzer replaced John Patrick Amedori in the role of Andrew Haplin, and Steven Weber replaced Dean Winters for the role of John Haplin.

== Cast and characters ==
- Geoff Stults as Deputy Tommy Conroy
- Lauren German as Henley Boone/"Chloe"
- Amy Acker as Rachel Conroy
- Robert Ray Wisdom as Detective Roger Hobbs
- Sarah Gadon as Georgia Bravin
- Sam Neill as Merritt Grieves
- Peter Outerbridge as Dan Farmer
- Jay Paulson as Deputy Eli "Root Beer" Rogers
- Steven Weber as John Haplin
- Warren Christie as Aidan "Greggy" Stiviletto
- Lynne Griffin as Dot Meadows
- Ben Schnetzer as Andrew Haplin

== Recurring cast ==
- Sophia Ewaniuk as Emma Conroy
- M. C. Gainey as Sheriff Griffin Conroy
- Frances Conroy as Peggy Haplin
- Natalie Brown as Carol Haplin
- Abraham Benrubi as Big Dave Duncan
- David Cronenberg as Dr. Leichman
- Stephen McHattie as Carl Bravin
- Dee Wallace as Alice Conroy
- Joanna Douglas as Officer Shell Jenkins
- Steve Arbuckle as Baby Boy Stiviletto

== Episodes ==
No.	Title	Directed by	Written by	Original release date	U.S. viewers (millions)
1	"In This Home on Ice"	Gary Fleder	Josh Appelbaum & André Nemec & Scott Rosenberg	April 28, 2010	5.25
Henley Boone arrives in seemingly idyllic Haplin to live. The shocking murder of Jerry Friddle occurs in a fishing cabin at the local pond. The brutal crime revives the town's memories of the "Magic Man," the alias of a kidnapper who has taken seven Haplin citizens in years past. Tommy Conroy, a town deputy and the son of Sheriff Griffin Conroy, is promoted when his father suffers a psychotic episode and cuts off his own hand with a hatchet.
2	"I Came to Haplin for the Waters"	Gary Fleder	Josh Appelbaum & André Nemec & Scott Rosenberg	May 5, 2010	3.79
Tommy investigates the Friddle murder. Henley seems to know more about Haplin's dark side than she's letting on and is determined to get access to the forbidden third-floor room of the boarding house where she is living.
3	"Polly Wants a Crack at Her"	Mick Garris	Davey Holmes	May 12, 2010	3.04
State investigator Dan Farmer steps in to assist local law enforcement with the Friddle murder case. Andrew Haplin, the son of the wealthiest family in town, believes that his girlfriend, Georgia, was assaulted by her drunkard father. He attempts to take revenge, but only ends up getting himself in trouble. A handsome stranger rescues Henley from a bizarre car accident caused by a hawk flying through her windshield. Thaw Fest finally arrives, but ends tragically when Tommy's wife, Rachel, disappears.
4	"Slight of Hand"	Darnell Martin	Meredith Averill	June 2, 2010	2.76
Rachel Conroy has disappeared and clues seem to indicate the elusive Magic Man is back. Henley retrieves her stolen hammer from the handsome stranger, who turns out to be recently released convict Greggy Stiviletto. Henley intends to use the goat-head hammer in a blackmail scheme. The severed hand of Lauryn Ward, one of the missing seven Magic Man victims, shows up on top of a loaf of bread in the local baking factory.
5	"This Is Why We Stay"	John Polson	Courtney Kemp Agboh	June 9, 2010	2.58
Tommy feels the pressure to find the elusive Magic Man. Rachel has returned but is deeply distressed by her ordeal and wants to leave Haplin. John Haplin, whose own daughter was taken by the Magic Man, is angry that Rachel doesn't remember any details of her kidnapping. Merritt Grieves, an eccentric local film buff, reveals a long-kept secret to Rachel. Henley blackmails the wealthiest woman in town, Peggy Haplin, into paying a large amount of money in exchange for Henley handing over the mysterious goat-head hammer. Det. Hobbs is convinced that Greggy Stiviletto knows who severed the hand found at the bakery.
6	"Questions and Antlers"	Ron Underwood	Story by : Byron Balasco; Teleplay by : Phil M. Rosenberg & Mike Flynn	June 16, 2010	2.17
John Haplin is suspected of being the Magic Man and is interrogated at the station. This would be the final episode of the show to be broadcast on ABC.
7	"Dallas Alice Doesn't Live Here Anymore"	Bobby Roth	Bryan Oh	July 1, 2010 (ABC.com)	N/A
Grieves and Henley scheme to take back the goat-head hammer. They attend a party at the Haplin estate, during which Henley is caught sneaking into an area marked as "off limits" to guests. She escapes and gets back the hammer with Grieves' help.
8	"Blame It on Rio Bravo"	Darnell Martin	Scott Rosenberg	July 1, 2010 (ABC.com)	N/A
Henley brings the goat-head hammer to Tommy and tells him Peggy used it to kill his mother years ago. Farmer is arrested under suspicion of being the Magic Man. Greggy and his brothers put together a vigilante posse in an attempt to get access to Farmer. Violence ensues as they storm the police station, but Grieves helps Farmer escape. Andrew learns about the Haplin family's dark secrets. Tommy confronts his father about the cover-up of his mother's murder, but receives no satisfactory answers.

== Ratings ==
Despite a promotional push from ABC, its debut episode performed poorly, scoring a 1.7/5 among 18-49's, with 5.2 million viewers overall, roughly scoring the same numbers in the same time period that predecessors Ugly Betty and Eastwick had during their run. In its second outing, the ratings slipped as did its audience, scoring a 1.2/4 among 18-49's and a 2.6/5 overall with 3.8 million viewers watching.

On May 11, 2010, ABC announced that it was pulling Happy Town from the schedule for two weeks, planning to resume its episode run on June 2; with the 5 remaining episodes airing on consecutive weeks. On May 17, 2010, ABC confirmed that Happy Town was among the shows cancelled from the 2009–2010 season. On June 18, 2010, ABC officially cancelled the series after its June 16, 2010 episode aired. On July 1, 2010, ABC.com released the two remaining episodes online.

=== Ratings chart ===
Order	Episode	Airdate	Rating	Share	Rating/Share (18–49)	Viewers (millions)	Rank (night)
1	"In This Home on Ice"	April 28, 2010	3.5	6	1.7/5	5.25	8
2	"I Came to Haplin for the Waters"	May 5, 2010	2.6	6	1.2/4	3.79	14
3	"Polly Wants a Crack at Her"	May 12, 2010	2.1	4	1.1/3	3.04	14
4	"Slight of Hand"	June 2, 2010	2.0	3	0.8/3	2.76	13
5	"This Is Why We Stay"	June 9, 2010	1.9	3	0.8/2	2.58	11
6	"Questions and Antlers"	June 16, 2010	1.6	3	0.6/2	2.17	12
