= The Pregnancy Pact =

2010 television film

- TV poster
- Written by: Pam Davis; Teena Booth
- Directed by: Rosemary Rodriguez
- Starring: Thora Birch; Madisen Beaty; Camryn Manheim
- Theme music composer: Richard Marvin
- Country of origin: United States
- Original language: English

Production
- Producers: Laurence Ducceschi; Robert M. Sertner; Frank von Zerneck
- Editor: Tod Feuerman
- Running time: 87 minutes

Original release
- Network: Lifetime
- Release: January 23, 2010

The Pregnancy Pact is a 2010 American teen drama television film directed by Rosemary Rodriguez. It stars Thora Birch, Madisen Beaty, and Camryn Manheim. It is based on the allegedly true story of a 2008 media circus surrounding a large group of teen girls at the Gloucester High School, Gloucester, Massachusetts, who allegedly agreed to concurrently get pregnant, give birth and raise their children communally.

The 2011 French film 17 Girls is based on the same events.

== Plot ==
28-year-old reporter Sidney Bloom learns that her old high school, Gloucester High, has reported ten to eighteen teen pregnancies in the past eight weeks, and decides to investigate the situation. The school nurse, Kim, tells Sidney that she has requested free birth control be provided to students, but the school has declined. While interviewing students, Sidney encounters pregnant teens Karissa, Iris, and Rose, who have all intentionally become pregnant at the same time and are encouraging fellow student Sara Dougan to get pregnant as well.

Fearful of losing her boyfriend Jesse's interest, Sara willingly gets pregnant by him. Her friends are pleased, but Jesse leaves her upon discovering the pregnancy. When Sara's father Michael discovers the truth, he quarrels with both her and her mother Lorraine, and Sara's relationship with Lorraine deteriorates. Sidney consoles Sara and reveals that she got pregnant at 16 by a school faculty member, Brady, and subsequently gave the baby up for adoption. Jesse tells Sara that his father is willing to pay for an abortion, but Sara urges him to cancel his plans for college and a career in baseball to start their family together.

Lorraine proposes a meeting of the school council to raise funds for the school's daycare center. Sidney, in attendance, requests birth control instead and reveals Sara's pregnancy, leading to Lorraine resigning from the council. A news story reporting on the girls' plans to raise their babies concurrently garners significant media attention. Tension rises between Jesse and his father when the latter implores him to focus on college and baseball instead of Sara. Sara tells Sidney of her dreams to marry Jesse and raise their child, not viewing a college education or a career as a priority. Later, Rose gives birth to a daughter, but her habit of smoking during pregnancy creates complications during labor, namely vaginal tearing, and leads to her daughter having to remain in the NICU.

After overhearing her discussing her revelation with Sidney, Jesse rejects Sara. Karissa's mother confronts her at a party, confessing how much she herself struggled as a single mother and imploring Karissa not to make the same mistake. At the party, Sara attempts to reconcile with Jesse, but he is adamant about not continuing their relationship or being present in their child's life. Devastated, Sara binge-drinks and nearly succumbs to alcohol poisoning, but later reconciles with her parents. Lorraine convinces the school council to keep her on board, and begins advocating for them to provide birth control and encourage abstinence.

In an epilogue, Sidney reveals that the principal resigned, and that the daycare is full, surmising that most girls have left the school in search of a better daycare. She encourages parents to be particular when advising their children about love, family, and relationships, and wishes the new mothers luck. Rose has become a reluctant mother and is shunned by the rest of her family for her teen pregnancy. During the final months of her pregnancy, Sara sees Jesse with his new girlfriend and begins to regret having become pregnant so young, lamenting the future she could have had with Jesse. The film concludes with Sara happily raising her daughter with the support of her parents.

== Cast ==
- Thora Birch as Sidney Bloom
- Madisen Beaty as Sara Dougan
- David Clayton Rogers as Brady Leary
- Max Ehrich as Jesse Moretti
- James McCaffrey as Michael Dougan
- Camryn Manheim as Nurse Kim Daly
- Nancy Travis as Lorraine Dougan
- Michelle DeFraites as Karissa
- Jenna Leigh Hall as Iris
- Erin Frederic as Kathleen Kingsbury; the Reporter
- Kelly Heyer as Rose
- Tim Powell as Principal Bachman
- Ben Winchell as Troy

== Production ==
The film uses actual news footage from the time of the story, including footage of Gloucester's then-mayor Carolyn Kirk accusing school principal Bachman of giving unverified information to Time magazine.

The performance of The Pregnancy Pact instigated the making of The Pregnancy Project, written by Teena Booth, who also co-wrote The Pregnancy Pact along with Pam Davis.

== Reception ==
It received a modest review in Variety, whose reviewer had rather seen the producers "developing an original story or more closely adhering to the one that motivated it". The family-oriented Common Sense Media gave 3 stars out of 5, citing that the movie could be a useful conversation starter between parents and teenagers.

Of the two hundred and fourteen Lifetime Original Movies released up to 2011, The Pregnancy Pact was ranked as the fourth highest rated movie on Lifetime television.
