= Connor Gibbs (actor) =

American child actor (born 2001)

- Born: February 2, 2001 (age 25); California
- Occupation: Actor
- Years active: 2007–2016

Connor Gibbs (born February 2, 2001) is an American child actor. He is best known for his role as Aiden Lucas in the TV series Ghost Whisperer.

== Filmography ==
Year	Title	Role	Notes
2007	Monk	Little Boy	Episode: Mr. Monk and the Daredevil
2007	Candy Shop	Jacob	Short film
2009–2010	Ghost Whisperer	Aiden Lucas	Season 5 (22 episodes)
2011	A Crush on You	Luke Anderson	TV movie
2011	Memphis Beat	Jack Ekler	Episode: At the River
2016	Modern Family	Bowtie Kid	Episode: Snow Ball
