= Joey Luthman =

American actor (born 1997)

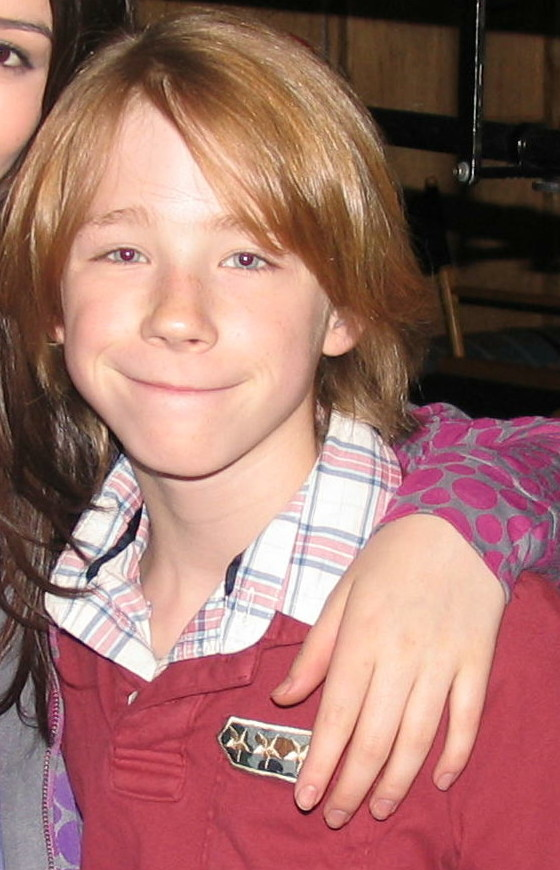
- Luthman in 2009
- Born: Joseph Gregory Wagner Luthman; January 13, 1997 (age 29); Dayton, Ohio, U.S.
- Other names: Joseph Luthman, Joey Wagner Luthman
- Occupation: Actor
- Years active: 2002–present

Joseph Gregory Wagner Luthman (born January 13, 1997) is an American actor. He is known for his recurring role as Rad Ferris on the series Weeds.

== Personal life ==
Luthman was born at Southview Hospital in Dayton, Ohio, on January 14, 1997. He began acting at age 5. His first performance was in Nuncrackers at the Dayton Playhouse, in Dayton, Ohio. His siblings, Jonathan Shine, Julien Shine and Lauren Shine were also in this production.

Luthman moved to Los Angeles in 2007 with his parents and younger sister Elise Luthman. He has had many TV and movie roles and now has over 60 credits on IMDb. His recently filmed guest star roles on Hawaii Five-0 and Chicago Med. Luthman is a North American professional League of Legends player. In 2017 he was given the series regular role of SPC Jonathan Riddell in the 21st Century FOX and National Geographic scripted series: The Long Road Home. The series premiered in early November 2017.

Joey Luthman was also involved in Allisyn Ashley Arm's YouTube series Astrid Clover where he portrayed her friend Beckett.

== Filmography ==
=== Film ===
Year	Title	Role	Notes
2007	The Whistler	Adam	Short film
2007	Negotiations	Young Casey Bennett	Short film, Credited as Joseph Luthman
2007	The Lost Boy	Andy	Short film
2007	Love Sophie	Sam	Short film
2008	Stars and Suns	Ben	Short film, Credited as Joey Wagner Luthman
2008	King of the Cardboard People	Sebastian	Short film
2008	An American Carol	Boy Scout	Feature film
2008	Last Meal	Happy	Short film
2009	Forget Me Not	Young Eli Channing	Feature film
2009	Save the Skeet	James Charm	Short film
2010	The Sinners	Jacob	Feature film
2010	Quest	Oliver	Short film
2010	Suppressant	Ralphie	Short film
2010	Kissing Strangers	Young Dean	Feature film
2010	Mad Dog and the Flyboy	Billy Thompson	Short film
2011	Bad Teacher	Eighth Grade Boy	Feature film
2014	Spirit of the Law	Isaac	Short film
2014	Tough Guy	Sean	Short film
2014	10.0 Earthquake	Teddy Toblosky	Feature film
2015	A Terrible Fate	Jack	Short film
2015	Coop	Cooper	Short film
2015	The 12th Stare	Actor	Short film
2015	Monsters	Isaac	Short film
2016	Opening Night	Lysander	Feature film
2016	They Watch	Peter Hawthorne	Short film
2018	The Last Champion	Ronnie Leadman	Feature film

=== Television ===
Year	Title	Role	Notes
2007	Human Giant	Picnic Family Boy	Episode: "The Ant Man", Credited as Joseph Luthman
2007	Big Shots	Birthday Party Guest	Episode: "Greatest Amerimart Hero", Uncredited
2008	October Road	Young Physical Phil	Episode: "Stand Alone by Me", Credited as Joey Wagner Luthman
2008	Weeds	Rad Ferris	5 episodes
2008	Eleventh Hour	Jesse Freeman	Episode: "Cardiac"
2008	1%	Doc	Television film, Credited as Joey Wagner Luthman
2008–2009	Private Practice	Evan Dawson/Porter	Episodes: "Worlds Apart"; "Sins of the Father"
2009	iCarly	Dave	Episode: "iQuit iCarly", Credited as Joey Wagner Luthman
2010	Ghost Whisperer	Joey	Episode: "Implosion"
2010	The Forgotten	Matthew Clarke	Episode: "Donovan Doe"
2011	New Girl	Student in flashback	Episode: "Cece Crashes"; Uncredited
2012	Kickin' It	Emmett	3 episodes
2012	How to Rock	Craig Kronberg	5 episodes
2013	A.N.T. Farm	Teen Zoltan	Episode: "Past, PresANT, and Future"
2013	Criminal Minds	Jake Preston	Episode: "Gatekeeper"
2013	Grey's Anatomy	Michael Hall	Episode: "Everybody's Crying Mercy"
2013	Chosen	King Orr	6 episodes
2014	The Goldbergs	Roger McFadden	2 episodes
2014	Modern Family	Drew	Episode: "Spring-a-Ding-Fling"
2014–2020	Astrid Clover	Beckett	Main Role; 102 episodes
2015	General Hospital	Young Luke Spencer/Young Bill Eckert	4 episodes
2015	Instant Mom	Stuart	2 episodes
2015	Short Girls Club	Bryan	5 episodes
2016	Hawaii Five-0	Reese Holland	Episode: "Ka Luhi"
2016	Chicago Med	Elliot Gallagher	Episode: "Generation Gap"
2016	Strings	Alex Murphy	10 episodes
2016	Last Man Standing	Nigel	Episode: "Eve's Band"
2017	The Long Road Home	SPC Jonathan Riddell	9 episodes
2020	Into the Arms of Danger	Guy	Television film (Lifetime)
2025	Monster: The Ed Gein Story	Dickie	Episode: "Green"

== Awards and nominations ==
Award	Year	Category	Result	Work
Young Artist Award	2009	Best Performance in a TV Series - Recurring Young Actor	Nominated	Weeds
Young Artist Award	2009	Best Performance in a Short Film - Young Actor	Nominated	Stars and Suns
Young Artist Award	2009	Best Performance in a TV Series - Guest Starring Young Actor	Won	Private Practice
Young Artist Award	2010	Best Performance in a TV Series - Guest Starring Young Actor 13 and Under	Nominated	iCarly
Young Artist Award	2010	Best Performance in a Short Film - Young Actor	Won	Save the Skeet
Young Artist Award	2011	Best Performance in a Short Film - Young Actor	Nominated	Mad Dog and the Flyboy
Young Artist Award	2011	Best Performance in a TV Series - Guest Starring Young Actor 14-17	Nominated	Ghost Whisperer
Young Artist Award	2012	Best Performance in a TV Movie, Miniseries or Special - Leading Young Actor	Nominated	The Joey and Elise show
