= List of Odd Squad episodes =

All Odd Squad episodes

Odd Squad is a live-action television series that premiered on TVOKids in Canada and PBS Kids in the United States on November 26, 2014, both on the same day. In the UK, the series is broadcast by CBBC. In Latin America, it airs on Discovery Kids. KiKa airs the show in German-speaking European countries. The fourth season of Odd Squad was filmed in the United Kingdom. It consists of 22 episodes and was released on October 1, 2024.

== Series overview ==
Season	Episodes	Originally released	
Season	Episodes	First released	Last released
1	40	November 26, 2014	May 30, 2016
2	35	June 20, 2016	January 21, 2019
Specials		August 1, 2016	January 15, 2018
3	33	February 17, 2020	July 8, 2022
4	12	October 1, 2024	October 24, 2024
5	12	April 6, 2026	October 28, 2026
6	12	April 2027	TBD

=== Season 1 (2014–16) ===
No. overall	No. in season	Title	Directed by	Written by	Original release date	Canadian air date	Prod. code
1	1	"Zero Effect"	J. J. Johnson	Tim McKeon	November 26, 2014	November 26, 2014 (Note: TVOKids airdate); January 3, 2015 (Note: Radio-Canada airdate)	101
1	1	"Bad Luck Bears"	J. J. Johnson	Story by Tim McKeon & Adam Peltzman written by Tim McKeon	November 26, 2014	November 26, 2014; January 3, 2015	101
Otto's birthday is coming up and a number hog is taking the number zero out of everything! Olive and Otto must find the culprit before the world is ruined and Otto becomes a one-year-old! Bad luck has come upon the Bears, Olive’s favorite basketball team, and a big game is coming up!
2	2	"Soundcheck"	J.J Johnson	Alex Fox & Rachel Lewis	November 26, 2014	November 30, 2014; January 10, 2015	102
2	2	"Double Trouble"	Michael Kennedy	Story by Tim McKeon & Adam Peltzman; Teleplay by Tim McKeon	November 26, 2014	November 30, 2014; January 10, 2015	102
Oddness is being created by "Take Away Four", a new song from Otto’s favorite band, Soundcheck. Delivery Debbie has doubled, and her double is ruining her business.
3	3	"My Better Half"	J. J. Johnson	Alex Fox & Rachel Lewis	November 27, 2014	November 27, 2014; January 24, 2015	105
3	3	"The Confalones"	Craig David Wallace	Nick Confalone	November 27, 2014	November 27, 2014; January 24, 2015	105
When symmetrical objects become vandalized and half of Otto’s body disappears, Olive must figure out why. Olive and Otto are called in to help when food is being rounded by a table inside an Italian restaurant.
4	4	"Blob on the Job"	J.J Johnson	Kenny Byerly	November 28, 2014	January 22, 2015; January 31, 2015	104
4	4	"Party of 5, 4, 3, 2, 1"	Craig David Wallace	Randolph Heard	November 28, 2014	January 22, 2015; January 31, 2015	104
When a blob gets loose in Odd Squad headquarters, Olive and Otto compete against Oren and Olaf to catch it first. When people in town can no longer count down, Olive and Otto must uncover who is causing the problem and why, so Ms. O can count down the new year.
5	5	"Reindeer Games"	J. J. Johnson	Mark De Angelis	December 1, 2014	December 22, 2014	103
Santa’s reindeer have escaped and shrunk, and Olive and Otto must help him! Meanwhile, Oscar must help Ms. O get off the Naughty List.
6	6	"Oscar and the Oscarbots"	Stefan Scaini	Tim McKeon	December 2, 2014	December 15, 2014; February 7, 2015	106
6	6	"Picture Day"	John May	Brendan Duffy	December 2, 2014	December 15, 2014; February 7, 2015	106
Several of Oscar's Oscarbots are missing in town! Olive and Otto must solve a case: people are becoming plaid, stripes & different colors during Otto's picture day!
7	7	"A Case of the Sing Alongs"	Brian K. Roberts	Amy Cole	December 3, 2014	December 3, 2014; February 14, 2015	107
7	7	"Ms. O Uh Oh"	Michael Kennedy	Terry McGurrin	December 3, 2014	December 3, 2014; February 14, 2015	107
When Mayor Macklemore catches a case of the Sing-Alongs, Olive and Otto must solve this odd problem so he won't sing along anymore. Ms.O from the past appears in her office, and they must get rid of her before it causes a Timetastrophe all over Headquarters.
8	8	"Crime at Shapely Manor: Part 1"	Vivieno Caldinelli	Story by Randolph Heard; Teleplay by Ben Joseph	December 4, 2014	January 15, 2015; January 17, 2015	108
8	8	"Crime at Shapely Manor: Part 2"	Vivieno Caldinelli	Ben Joseph	December 4, 2014	January 15, 2015; January 17, 2015	108
Olive and Otto are sent to Shapley Manor to investigate an odd crime with even odder people.
9	9	"Skip Day"	Stefan Scaini	Guy Toubes	December 5, 2014	December 27, 2014; February 21, 2015	109
9	9	"The Great Grinaldi"	Brian K. Roberts	Ron Holsey	December 5, 2014	December 27, 2014; February 21, 2015	109
When Olive catches a case of the Skips and goes missing, rookie agent Otto must solve his first case by himself. Otto rushes to finish a case so he can see his favorite magician, The Great Grinaldi, perform.
10	10	"The Trouble with Centigurps"	N/A	Guy Toubes	December 8, 2014	December 28, 2014; February 28, 2015	110
10	10	"Totally Odd Squad"	Ron Holsey	Guy Toubes	December 8, 2014	December 28, 2014; February 28, 2015	110
When Otto accidentally releases 100 small furry creatures in headquarters, he recruits Oscar to help get them back before Ms. O finds out. In a flashback episode, Ms. O tells the story of how she defeated a villain called the Patternista back when she was an agent.
11	11	"How to Interrogate a Unicorn"	N/A	Tim McKeon	December 9, 2014	December 11, 2014; March 7, 2015	111
11	11	"The Briefcase"	Ron Holsey	Tim McKeon	December 9, 2014	December 11, 2014; March 7, 2015	111
When characters escape their books in the library, Olive and Otto must figure out how and why it's happening and put a stop to it. When Ms. O's important briefcase is stolen by a shape shifter, Olive and Otto must get it back.
12	12	"Best Seats in the House"	N/A	Mark De Angelis	December 10, 2014	March 15, 2015; April 19, 2015	112
12	12	"Agent Obfusco"	Guy Toubes	Mark De Angelis	December 10, 2014	March 15, 2015; April 19, 2015	112
Olive and Otto battle Oren and Olaf for the best chairs at Odd Squad while Ms. O and Oscar run a top secret mission. Olive and Otto become concerned when they find out their Odd Squad test is being administered by the mysterious Agent Obfusco.
13	13	"Life of O'Brian"	N/A	Jeff Detsky	December 19, 2014	March 2, 2015; April 19, 2015	113
13	13	"Whatever Happened to Agent Oz?"	Charles Johnston	Jeff Detsky	December 19, 2014	March 2, 2015; April 19, 2015	113
When a miffed O'Brian won't let Olive access the tubes, she has to solve the mystery of what she did to upset him. Olive tells Otto the story of what happened to Octavia's partner, Agent Oz.
14	14	"The Jackies"	N/A	Stephen Senders	December 26, 2014	February 2, 2015; March 29, 2015	114
14	14	"Invasion of the Body Switchers"	Mark De Angelis	Stephen Senders	December 26, 2014	February 2, 2015; March 29, 2015	114
Ms. O tries to get her Odd Squad to win the Jackalope Award for most solved cases. Ms. O and Oscar switch bodies!
15	15	"The Odd Antidote"	N/A	Nick Flanagan	January 5, 2015	February 9, 2015; April 5, 2015	115
15	15	"The One That Got Away"	Jeff Detsky	Nick Flanagan	January 5, 2015	February 9, 2015; April 5, 2015	115
Something odd is happening to Ms. O! Ms. O recognizes a villain from when she was an agent!
16	16	"Odd Outbreak"	N/A	Amy Cole	January 12, 2015	February 23, 2015; April 12, 2015	116
16	16	"The Perfect Lunch"	Charles Johnston	Amy Cole	January 12, 2015	February 23, 2015; April 12, 2015	116
Dr. O takes the lead on the case of a strange medical crisis that causes chaos right in middle of Odd Squad HQ. Olive, Otto and Oscar help Ms. O host a lunch for some very important but easily offended guests.
17	17	"Rise of the Hydraclops"	N/A	Ron Holsey	January 19, 2015	February 23, 2015; April 19, 2015	117
17	17	"O is Not for Old"	Julie Sherman Wolfe	Ron Holsey	January 19, 2015	February 23, 2015; April 19, 2015	117
The Hydraclops is about to rise out of the lake and destroy the town. It's Ms. O's birthday, and Oscar is planning a surprise party!
18	18	"Dance Like Nobody's Watching"	N/A	Allana Harkin	January 19, 2015	March 2, 2015; April 26, 2015	118
18	18	"Recipe for Disaster"	Nick Flanagan	Allana Harkin	January 19, 2015	March 2, 2015; April 26, 2015	118
The Odd Squad alarm system has been turned on, and no one remembers the off code, so, to get in, the agents must face booby traps! There is a vortex of Oddness in town!
19	19	"Hold the Door"	N/A	Robby Hoffman	January 20, 2015	March 9, 2015; May 3, 2015	119
19	19	"Flatastrophe"	Kenny Byerly	Robby Hoffman	January 20, 2015	March 9, 2015; May 3, 2015	119
When a young Agent-in-Training gets lost in headquarters, Olive and Otto must find him before Ms. O finds out. Olive and Otto must stop Fladam, a villain with a vendetta against cubes.
20	20	"Puppet Show"	N/A	Charles Johnston	January 21, 2015	March 16, 2015; May 10, 2015	120
20	20	"Mystic Egg Pizza"	Mark De Angelis	Charles Johnston	January 21, 2015	March 16, 2015; May 10, 2015	120
Olive and Otto have to crack a case where a group of people have been turned into puppets. With the help of Odd Squad, Delivery Debbie and Delivery Doug must figure out why their food is disappearing.
21	21	"6:00 to 6:05"	Unknown	Tim McKeon	January 22, 2015	March 23, 2015; May 17, 2015	121
At exactly 6:05, the dinosaurs break out of the dinosaur containment room at headquarters, forcing Olive and Otto to go back in time to thwart the situation
22	22	"The Potato Ultimato"	N/A	Amy Benham	March 31, 2015	March 30, 2015; May 24, 2015	122
22	22	"Fistful of Fruit Juice"	Jeff Detsky	Amy Benham	March 31, 2015	March 30, 2015; May 24, 2015	122
When Otto starts shrinking, Olaf leads Olive and Oren on a quest for the only known cure—The Magical Growing Potato. Ms. O tells Olive and Otto the story of how she first joined up with Odd Squad.
23	23	"Soundcheck Part Deux"	N/A	Alex Fox & Rachel Lewis	April 1, 2015	April 11, 2015; May 31, 2015	123
23	23	"Jinx"	Andrew De Angelis	Alex Fox & Rachel Lewis	April 1, 2015	April 11, 2015; May 31, 2015	123
Danny T. from Soundcheck comes to Odd Squad with troubling news-the other members of Soundcheck are missing! When Olive, Otto and the entire Odd Squad office catch the Jinx disease, Oscar and Dr. O must fill in for them and they can only solve the Jinx problem because they caught the Jinx disease before and they didn't want to be caught again.
24	24	"Training Day"	Unknown	Story by Tim McKeon & Adam Peltzman; Teleplay by Tim McKeon	May 25, 2015	June 8, 2015; June 28, 2015	124
Olive tells the story of what happened to her old partner, Agent Todd.
25	25	"Trading Places"	N/A	Laurie Parres	May 26, 2015	April 25, 2015; July 5, 2015	125
25	25	"Bad Lemonade"	Ben Joseph	Laurie Parres	May 26, 2015	April 25, 2015; July 5, 2015	125
When Odd Todd (Olive's former partner) steals Oscar's Flip-Flop-inator gadget, only Oscar can save the day. Odd Todd takes over Polly Graph's lemonade stand that drives her out of business and he's using a series of misleading graphs and charts, but his lemonade turns people into lemonheads. Olive and Otto must prove that he's up to no good.
26	26	"Robert Plant"	N/A	Stephen Senders	May 27, 2015	May 2, 2015; June 7, 2015	126
26	26	"Game Time"	Kevin Seccia	Stephen Senders	May 27, 2015	May 2, 2015; June 7, 2015	126
After overfeeding agent Obfusco's plant, Olive and Otto must find a way to stop it from growing, before it takes over HQ. When Otto strangely gets trapped inside a video game, it is up to Olive to rescue him before there are any permanent consequences.
27	27	"The O Games"	Unknown	Kathleen Phillips	May 28, 2015	July 12, 2015	127
Otto is chosen to participate in The O Games against Octavia, Oren, Dr. O...and Odd Todd!
28	28	"Captain Fun"	N/A	Story by Leah Gotcsik; Teleplay by Nick Flanagan	May 29, 2015	May 16, 2015; July 19, 2015	128
28	28	"Switch Your Partner Round and Round"	Mark De Angelis	Story by Leah Gotcsik; Teleplay by Nick Flanagan	May 29, 2015	May 16, 2015; July 19, 2015	128
While Olive is on break, Otto competes with Oren to be Captain Fun. Olive and Otto imagine what it would've been like if Olive was partnered with Oren and Otto was partnered with Olaf.
29	29	"Trials and Tubulations"	Unknown	Charles Johnston	July 15, 2015	April 18, 2015; June 21, 2015	129
Olive and Otto crash out of the tube system...and into Sector 21! Ms. O has to bring in every tube operator in existence to try to get her agents out of danger.
30	30	"No Ifs, Ands, or Robots"	Unknown	Charles Johnston	July 22, 2015	May 30, 2015; July 26, 2015	131
30	30	"Worst First Day Ever"	Unknown	Charles Johnston	July 22, 2015	May 30, 2015; July 26, 2015	131
When one of Oscar's Oscarbots goes haywire and gets loose, Olive and Oscar need to find out why Oscarbot 10 is boxing everything up. After Ori becomes an agent, he loses 100 centigurps on his first day.
31	31	"Undercover Olive"	Unknown	Tim McKeon	October 12, 2015	August 2, 2015	132
The villains are hosting a Rock, Paper, Scissors tournament to determine who owns the Odd Squad Tube map-and Olive must win as Kooky Clown!
32	32	"Not So Splash"	N/A	Alex Fox & Rachel Lewis	October 13, 2015	August 9, 2015	133
32	32	"By The Book"	Jeff Detsky	Alex Fox & Rachel Lewis	October 13, 2015	August 9, 2015	133
A villain is making spots in the town cold in the middle of summer, and Olive and Otto must solve the case! The agents have to question suspects to find out which one is guilty.
33	33	"O vs. The Ballcano"	N/A	Amy Benham	November 25, 2015	August 16, 2015	134
33	33	"Assistant's Creed"	Mark De Angelis	Amy Benham	November 25, 2015	August 16, 2015	134
The ball pit goes out of control, and the agents have to stop it before they lose another headquarters. Ms. O's assistants tackle a real case on their own.
34	34	"Now You Don't See Me"	N/A	Nick Flanagan	November 26, 2015	August 23, 2015	135
34	34	"Moustache Confidential"	Andrew De Angelis	Nick Flanagan	November 26, 2015	August 23, 2015	135
Townspeople and agents are turning invisible, and Olive and Otto have to solve the case. Someone has stolen Agent Obfusco's mustache and the agents have to solve riddles to help him.
35	35	"The Curious Case of Pirate-It is"	N/A	Amy Benham	January 4, 2016	May 23, 2015; June 14, 2015	130
35	35	"Oscar The Couch"	Tim McKeon	Amy Benham	January 4, 2016	May 23, 2015; June 14, 2015	130
Otto and Oscar must stop Olive from becoming a pirate. Oscar turns into a couch and Olive and Otto must turn him back before Ms. O finds out.
36	36	"Oscar of All Trades"	J.J. Johnson	Tim McKeon	January 18, 2016	September 13, 2015	137
36	36	"Swamps 'N' Gators"	J.J. Johnson	Mark De Angelis	January 18, 2016	September 13, 2015	137
Oscar tells Olive his backstory. Olive and Otto get sucked into a board game and must complete the game before getting stuck there forever.
37	37	"There Might Be Dragons"	N/A	Adam Peltzman	January 19, 2016	September 20, 2015	138
37	37	"Dawn of the Read"	Amy Cole	Adam Peltzman	January 19, 2016	September 20, 2015	138
After the power goes out in headquarters, Olive, Otto, Ms. O, and Oscar must figure out a way keep two dragon eggs from hatching. Otto tells Olive the story of when Oren and Olaf investigate flying books at the local library.
38	38	"Olive and Otto in Schmumberland"	Unknown	Tim McKeon	February 16, 2016	September 27, 2015	139
Olive and Otto get sucked into a Shmumberman comic book.
39	39	"Disorder in the Court: Part 1"	N/A	Jeff Detsky	February 17, 2016	September 29, 2015; August 30, 2015	136
39	39	"Disorder in the Court: Part 2"	Story by Mark De Angelis & Jeff Detsky; Teleplay by Mark De Angelis	Jeff Detsky	February 17, 2016	September 29, 2015; August 30, 2015	136
Olive has been put on trial for causing oddness!
40	40	"O Is Not for Over"	Unknown	Tim McKeon	May 30, 2016	December 8, 2015; October 4, 2015	140
Olive and Otto face their biggest challenge yet!

=== Season 2 (2016–19) ===
Odd Squad was renewed for a second season, which premiered on June 20, 2016, with "Agents of Change", a one-hour special combining the first season's finale with the second season's premiere.

No. overall	No. in season	Title	Directed by	Written by	American air date (PBS)	Canadian air date (TVO)	French air date (Radio-Canada)	Prod. code
41	1	"First Day"	J. J. Johnson	Tim McKeon	June 20, 2016	June 21, 2016	TBA	201
Otto and Olive have been respectively replaced by two new agents named Olympia and Otis.
42	2	"Back to the Past"	Brian K. Roberts	Amy Benham	June 21, 2016	June 23, 2016	TBA	202
42	2	"Odd Squad Needs You"	Brian K. Roberts	Jeff Detsky	June 21, 2016	June 23, 2016	TBA	202
By dropping a time-travel gadget, Oscar, Oona, Otis and Olympia accidentally get sucked into a different day in time and have to figure out what day they are in without causing a "time-tastrophe". Otis agrees to help Ms. O make a recruitment commercial for Odd Squad, however, Ms. O proves to be difficult to work with.
43	3	"Mid-Day in the Garden of Good and Odd"	Brian K. Roberts	Alex Fox & Rachel Lewis	June 23, 2016	June 28, 2016	TBA	203
43	3	"Failure to Lunch"	Brian K. Roberts	Mark De Angelis	June 23, 2016	June 28, 2016	TBA	203
Otis and Olympia need the help of Odd Todd (who has become a gardener) to solve an odd case. Because Otis thinks Olympia can't stop working, Olympia and Otis agree to go out for lunch.
44	4	"The O Team"	Unknown	Mark De Angelis	June 27, 2016	June 30, 2016	TBA	204
44	4	"Show Me the Money"	Nick Flanagan	Mark De Angelis	June 27, 2016	June 30, 2016	TBA	204
To have a pizza party, security agents Owen and Ohio secretly provide backup on Otis and Olympia's case. Olympia and Otis accidentally let an un-lucky nickel get loose out of headquarters.
45	5	"Flawed Squad"	Unknown	Matt Doyle	June 28, 2016	July 14, 2016	TBA	205
45	5	"The Creature Whisperer"	Charles Johnston	Matt Doyle	June 28, 2016	July 14, 2016	TBA	205
Odd Squad agents must deal with villains who broke into Odd Squad HQ. Olympia and Ocean try to catch a loose creature before The Big O finds out.
46	6	"Oscar Strikes Back"	J.J. Johnson	Tim McKeon	July 5, 2016	July 5, 2016	TBA	206
At a gathering of Odd Squad scientists called Lab Con located in Odd Squad Academy, president of the scientists, Obbs starts mind controlling every scientist except for Oscar to take over Odd Squad; Oscar and Ms. O with the help of Oona must stop Obbs and his evil scheme.
47	7	"Olympia's Day"	Stephen Reynolds	Tim McKeon	July 6, 2016	July 7, 2016	TBA	207
47	7	"Otis' Day"	Stephen Reynolds	Matt Doyle	July 6, 2016	July 7, 2016	TBA	207
After Ms. O gives Olympia a new room to work in, all the agents want a piece of it. Otis and Noisemaker need to go back to headquarters while the tubes are down for maintenance.
48	8	"And Then They Were Puppies"	Courtney Goldman	Robby Hoffman	July 7, 2016	July 12, 2016	TBA	208
48	8	"A Case of the Sillies"	Courtney Goldman	Charles Johnston	July 7, 2016	July 12, 2016	TBA	208
The Puppymaster turns all agents except Olhm into puppies. Because Dr. O catches a case of "The Sillies", Ocean and Oona must collect all the ingredients to make a curing antidote.
49	9	"Happy Halfiversary"	Mars Horodyski	Scott Montgomery	July 8, 2016	July 26, 2016	TBA	209
49	9	"Good Egg Bad Egg"	J. J. Johnson	Tim McKeon	July 8, 2016	July 26, 2016	TBA	209
Otis, being unaware that he had to get Olympia a gift for their "Halfiversary", races to find one. Ms. O, Ocean, Otis, and Olympia try to determine what kind of creature will hatch from an egg.
50	10	"Night Shift"	Warren P. Sonoda	Amy Benham	July 11, 2016	August 7, 2016	TBA	210
50	10	"Put Me In, Coach"	J. J. Johnson	Adam Peltzman	July 11, 2016	August 7, 2016	TBA	210
Otis and Olympia discover how different Odd Squad headquarters are at night and struggle to get their work done. Note: The episode has a brief crossover with Wild Kratts. Ms. O accidentally calls Partners, Otis and Olympia and partners, Oriele and Orielle to return a magical orb to Cloud Town, the land of the unicorns. Because all of the agents want to visit Cloud Town and Ms. O refuses to let 4 agents take the case, she decides that they'll settle it by seeing Coach O.
51	11	"Extreme Cake-over"	Unknown	Charles Johnston	November 7, 2016	October 10, 2016	TBA	211
51	11	"A Job Well Undone"	Amanda Brooke Perrin	Charles Johnston	November 7, 2016	October 10, 2016	TBA	211
When a virus that turns people into cakes spreads through Headquarters, Agents, Otis and Olympia try to figure out what's causing it. Before agents, Otis and Olympia can win Agents of the Month, Otis must finish filing his paperwork.
52	12	"Three's Company"	Stefan Scaini	Robby Hoffman	November 8, 2016	October 17, 2016	TBA	212
52	12	"Behind Enemy Mimes"	J. J. Johnson	Charles Johnston	November 8, 2016	October 17, 2016	TBA	212
Because Ms. O's office is under maintenance, Olympia suggests that Ms. O can work downstairs. Otis, Olympia, and Ms. O try to tracking down Ms. O's old partner, O'Donahue, and defeat a trio of mimes.
53	13	"Drop Gadget Repeat"	Stefan Scaini	Tim McKeon	November 9, 2016	October 24, 2016	TBA	213
53	13	"20 Questions"	Warren P. Sonoda	Adam Peltzman	November 9, 2016	October 24, 2016	TBA	213
By dropping a time-travel gadget, Oona gets stuck in a time loop and brings Otis and Olympia along with her. The villain, Backwards Bob has set off a backwards bubble in headquarters and can only have 20 questions to ask from him on how to get the forward bubble.
54	14	"High Maintenance"	Stefan Scaini	Charles Johnston	November 10, 2016	TBA	TBA	214
54	14	"Not OK Computer"	Stefan Scaini	Amy Benham	November 10, 2016	TBA	TBA	214
Otis and Olympia's misunderstandings of the importance of maintenance displease the maintenance workers and cause them to switch jobs for a day. Olympia, with Otis gets trapped in her computer.
55	15	"O Is for Opposite"	Stephen Reynolds	Scott Montgomery	March 20, 2017	November 21, 2016	TBA	215
55	15	"Agent Oksana's Kitchen Nightmares"	Warren P. Sonoda	Jeff Detsky	March 20, 2017	November 21, 2016	TBA	215
When Ms. O gets trapped in a mirror, and Ms. O's reflection escapes, Olympia, Otis, and Oona must predict where Opposite Ms. O will be to catch her and free the real Ms. O. Because Oksana refuses to cook for Odd Squad unless Ms. O gives her her desires, Otis and Olympia take Oksana's job for the day.
56	16	"Rookie Night"	Zoe Robyn	Mark De Angelis	March 21, 2017	November 28, 2016	TBA	216
56	16	"Who Let The Doug Out?"	Warren P. Sonoda	Mark De Angelis	March 21, 2017	November 28, 2016	TBA	216
Otis and Olympia want to participate in Rookie Night before it is over. Fladam and Lady Bread argue over who the oddest villain is, Meanwhile, Olympia and Otis help Delivery Doug make egg salad sandwiches.
57	17	"The Cherry-On-Top-Inator"	J. J. Johnson	Adam Peltzman	March 22, 2017	December 4, 2016	TBA	217
57	17	"Sir"	J. J. Johnson	Tim McKeon	March 22, 2017	December 4, 2016	TBA	217
Because Oona thinks the cherry-on-top-inator gadget is useless, Ocean, Orchid, Olympia, Otis, and Ohlm try to convince her not to destroy it. Otis, Olympia, and Oona help a man who is slowly turning into spaghetti
58	18	"Orchid's Almost Half Hour Talent Show"	J. J. Johnson	Robby Hoffman	July 17, 2017	December 9, 2016	TBA	218
58	18	"The Perfect Score"	Stephen Reynolds	Amanda Brooke Perrin	July 17, 2017	December 9, 2016	TBA	218
Olympia tries to get into Agent Orchid's Talent show. Olympia is tracking down the villain who gave her a 1 out of 10 on the Odd Squad rankings.
59	19	"The Voice"	Lara Azzopardi	James Gangl	July 18, 2017	December 11, 2016	TBA	219
59	19	"Partner Problems"	Stephen Reynolds	Charles Johnston	July 18, 2017	December 11, 2016	TBA	219
A villain steals Ms. O's voice, and Olympia and Otis have to figure out who did it. While Olympia is on her vacation, Orchid and Ohlm have trouble with a case and Otis helps them.
60	20	"Oona and the Oonabots"	J. J. Johnson	Tim McKeon	July 19, 2017	December 16, 2016	TBA	220
60	20	"The Ninja Situation"	Stephen Reynolds	Adam Peltzman	July 19, 2017	December 16, 2016	TBA	220
A creature is turning agents into stone and Oona and Ocean with the help of Oonabots try to stop it. Otis goes undercover as Evil Ninja to recover a stolen gadget from The Yum-Yum Twins.
61	21	"Breakfast Club"	Stephen Reynolds	Mark De Angelis	July 20, 2017	September 28, 2016	TBA	221
61	21	"Dr. O: Party Time, Excellent"	Stephen Reynolds	Alex Fox & Rachel Lewis	July 20, 2017	September 28, 2016	TBA	221
Olympia and Otis with the help of Delivery Debbie go undercover to stop a group of villains who call themselves The Breakfast Club. After finding out Dr. O is leaving Odd Squad to become a doctor in space, Olympia tries to throw her a goodbye party on a low-budget.
63	23	"Haunt Squad"	Stefan Scaini	Mark De Angelis	October 16, 2017	October 26, 2016	TBA	223
63	23	"Safe House in the Woods"	Mars Horodyski	Ashley Botting	October 16, 2017	October 26, 2016	TBA	223
Olympia is convinced that there is a ghost roaming headquarters while Otis disagrees and tries to tell Olympia that ghosts do not exist. While waiting out a storm and transporting a creature, Owen tries to convince the new recruit, Ozlyn to join the security department.
62	22	"Xs and Os"	Warren P. Sonoda	Adam Peltzman	October 17, 2017	October 23, 2016	TBA	222
62	22	"Dr. O No"	Warren P. Sonoda	Liz Hara	October 17, 2017	October 23, 2016	TBA	222
Special task force agents, Xavier and Xena arrive to shut down the Odd Squad headquarters unless the agents there stay on a budget. Oona helps Dr. O's former replacement, Olly cure patients with odd ailments.
64	24	"Negative Town"	Warren P. Sonoda	Scott Montgomery	October 18, 2017	October 24, 2016	TBA	224
64	24	"License to Science"	Warren P. Sonoda	Amy Benham	October 18, 2017	October 24, 2016	TBA	224
Otis and Olympia track down a villain who is causing oddness in a strange town called Negative Town. Otis tries to help Oona pass her lab director's test that she must pass to stay at Odd Squad.
65	25	"Two Agents and a Baby"	Stephen Reynolds	Andrew De Angelis	October 19, 2017	December 3, 2016	TBA	225
65	25	"Ocean and the Fly"	Stephen Reynolds	Charles Johnston	October 19, 2017	December 3, 2016	TBA	225
Otis and Olympia try to solve a case while babysitting Baby Genius. Oona accidentally switches bodies with a fly and Ocean tries to help her get her normal body restored.
66	26	"Hands on a Desk Chair"	Stefan Scaini	James Gangl	March 26, 2018	December 10, 2017	TBA	226
66	26	"There Is No O in O-Bot"	Stefan Scaini	Scott Montgomery	March 26, 2018	December 10, 2017	TBA	226
While Ms. O is on a secret mission, Otis, Olympia, Orchid, Owen, Ocean, and Coach O have a competition to see who can keep their hands on the chair the longest; whoever is the last one touching the chair will be Ms. O for the day. Xena and Xavier force Otis and Olympia to solve a case with an obnoxious robot named Omega.
67	27	"Shapely University"	Sherren Lee	Robby Hoffman	March 27, 2018	January 7, 2018	TBA	227
67	27	"Slow Day"	Unknown	Ron Holsey	March 27, 2018	January 7, 2018	TBA	227
Otis and Olympia compete against rival Odd Squad agents to catch a loose creature. Otis and Olympia must figure out what is causing some town people to slow down.
68	28	"Villains in Need are Villains Indeed"	Unknown	Andrew De Angelis	March 28, 2018	January 14, 2018	TBA	228
68	28	"Happily Ever Odd"	Robby Hoffman	Andrew De Angelis	March 28, 2018	January 14, 2018	TBA	228
Villains need the help of Odd Squad to stop a giant robot. Donnie gets lost in headquarters on the day of Ronnie's wedding.
69	29	"Where There's a Wolf, There's a Way"	Warren P. Sonoda	Leah Gotcsik	June 11, 2018	January 28, 2018	TBA	229
69	29	"New Jacket Required"	Warren P. Sonoda	Mark De Angelis	June 11, 2018	January 28, 2018	TBA	229
Werewolf agent Olaf is turning back into a boy. Otis struggles with a new jacket that is more high-tech than his old one.
70	30	"The Deposit Slip-Up"	Unknown	Matt Doyle	June 18, 2018	February 4, 2018	TBA	230
70	30	"Villains Always Win"	Adam Peltzman	Matt Doyle	June 18, 2018	February 4, 2018	TBA	230
Odd Squad builds a replica of the villain's vault along with the town to intercept a stolen jetpack. Olympia must star in a game show where villains always win, while Otis and Oona try to retrieve a stolen gadget.
71	31	"Other Olympia"	Unknown	Gentry Menzel	June 22, 2018	TBA	TBA	231
71	31	"Total Zeros"	Adam Peltzman	Gentry Menzel	June 22, 2018	TBA	TBA	231
After tracking down a villain named Sandman with her partner, Ozric, Ms. O's former assistant, Olympia (Saara Chaudry) returns to headquarters and Olympia (Anna Cathcart) struggles to go along while there is an agent in headquarters with her same name. Ms. O tells Olympia and Otis the story of the villains, Total Zeros.
72	32	"It Takes Goo to Make a Feud Go Right"	Melanie Orr	Jay Vaidya	October 5, 2018	April 1, 2018	TBA	232
72	32	"Friends of Odd Squad"	J. J. Johnson	James Gangl	October 5, 2018	April 1, 2018	TBA	232
Olympia and Otis are tasked with calling a truce between feuding guests. While Odd Squad is on a picnic, Ms. O leaves headquarters in the hands of Hopkins, Mr. Fonts, Party Pam, and Logan the ogre.
73	33	"Saving Agent Orson"	Unknown	Mark De Angelis	October 22, 2018	April 2, 2018	TBA	233
73	33	"The Scientist"	Adam Peltzman	Mark De Angelis	October 22, 2018	April 2, 2018	TBA	233
Odd Squad agents try to convince to the X's that Orson is a good agent before the X's kick Orson off the squad. Oona gets trapped into another dimension which is similar to the normal dimension except she is alone; now Oona must figure out a way to get back home.
74	34	"Who Is Agent Otis?"	J. J. Johnson	Tim McKeon	January 21, 2019	April 3, 2018	TBA	234
When Noisemaker accidentally reveals information about a notebook, Olympia goes on a search party to find it, but later discovers the truth about her partner Otis.
75	35	"Odds and Ends"	J. J. Johnson	Tim McKeon	January 21, 2019	April 4, 2018	TBA	235
After Otis and Ms. O are kicked off Odd Squad, Olympia, Otis, Oona, and Ms. O try to figure out which one of the agents is trying to destroy Odd Squad and stop them.

=== Season 3: Mobile Unit (2020–22) ===
Odd Squad was renewed for a third season, which premiered on February 17, 2020. The third season is titled Odd Squad: Mobile Unit and focuses on an Odd Squad team that travels the world solving odd cases "like a globe-trotting creature or a villain that is causing oddness across multiple towns." The season starts with a one-hour special titled: "Odd Beginnings".

No. overall	No. in season	Title	Directed by	Written by	American air date (PBS)	Canadian air date (TVO)	French air date (Radio-Canada)	Prod. code
76	1	"Odd Beginnings Part 1"	J. J. Johnson	Story by Tim McKeon; Teleplay by Tim McKeon & Adam Peltzman	February 17, 2020	February 25, 2020	TBA	301
77	2	"Odd Beginnings Part 2"	J. J. Johnson	Story by Tim McKeon; Teleplay by Tim McKeon & Adam Peltzman	February 17, 2020	February 25, 2020	TBA	302
Agents at an Odd Squad headquarters in the arctic, Opal and Omar were set out to find and save a legendary odd artifact—the 44-leaf clover.
78	3	"Portalandia"	Stefan Scaini	Johanna Stein	February 18, 2020	March 3, 2020	TBA	303
78	3	"Slides and Ladders"	Stefan Scaini	Andrew De Angelis	February 18, 2020	March 3, 2020	TBA	303
When Orla rushes through constructing a portal without reading and following the instructions, Omar, Oswald, & Opal end up stuck in the 17th dimension. Oswald finally lands an interview on a famous Odd Squad podcast to talk about the new Mobile Unit van.
79	4	"Running on Empty"	Warren P. Sonoda	Mark De Angelis	February 19, 2020	March 10, 2020	TBA	304
On the way to deliver a baby blob to The Big O in London, England, the Mobile Unit van runs out of fuel.
80	5	"Orla's Birthday"	Lisa Rose Snow	Amanda Brooke Perrin	February 20, 2020	March 17, 2020	TBA	305
80	5	"Jeremy"	Lisa Rose Snow	Robby Hoffman	February 20, 2020	March 17, 2020	TBA	305
Omar has plans to surprise Orla with a 500th birthday party, but normal party gifts aren't going to fare well with her. In Quebec, Canada, the team accidentally gets locked out of its Mobile Unit van and need the help from a young fan of Odd Squad.
81	6	"The Thrill of the Face"	Melanie Orr	Amanda Brooke Perrin	February 24, 2020	March 24, 2020	TBA	306
81	6	"Raising The Bar"	Heather Hawthorn Doyle	Eric Toth	February 24, 2020	March 24, 2020	TBA	306
The team is sent to the Museum of Natural Odd when an ancient stone warrior has been let loose. Trouble ensues when the Mobile Unit receives a low ranking on the Odd Squad Magazine progress report.
82	7	"Odd Squad in the Shadows"	Stefan Scaini	Adam Peltzman	February 25, 2020	March 31, 2020	TBA	307
The Mobile Unit is called to Pinehurst, North Carolina, to stop a villain who is stealing various objects.
83	8	"Train of Thoughts"	Stephen Reynolds	Eric Toth	February 26, 2020	April 7, 2020	TBA	308
83	8	"Overdue!"	Stefan Scaini	Tim McKeon	February 26, 2020	April 7, 2020	TBA	308
There's a villain turning train cars odd, and the Mobile Unit must figure out the pattern in which the villain is striking. The X's (Xuxa and Xeno) kick Agent Orla off the squad when a library book she took out 400 years ago is overdue.
84	9	"The Void"	Stephen Reynolds	Mark De Angelis	March 2, 2020	April 14, 2020	TBA	309
84	9	"Into the Odd Woods"	Lisa Rose Snow	Lakna Edilima	March 2, 2020	April 14, 2020	TBA	309
The team is sent to investigate an odd tunnel at Newport, Maine; however, while doing so, Omar gets trapped into a void. After Omar gets a case of "Clownitosis", Opal and Oswald must go into the Odd Woods in São Paulo, Brazil to collect ingredients for an antidote.
85	10	"Slow Your Roll"	Warren P. Sonoda	Mark De Angelis	March 3, 2020	April 21, 2020	TBA	310
The Mobile Unit van gets taken over by The Shadow.
86	11	"Music of Sound"	Warren P. Sonoda	Gabrielle Meyer	July 6, 2020	July 14, 2020	TBA	311
The Mobile Unit must convince Soundcheck to get back together again.
87	12	"Odd in 60 Seconds"	Gloria Ui Young Kim	Tim McKeon	July 7, 2020	July 21, 2020	TBA	312
87	12	"Villain Networking"	Stefan Scaini	Stephanie Kaliner	July 7, 2020	July 21, 2020	TBA	312
The Mobile Unit is called to Odd Squad's top-secret Security facility. The Shadow tries to convince villains to join her Villain Network.
88	13	"Mr. Unpredictable"	Stefan Scaini	Adam Peltzman	July 8, 2020	July 28, 2020	TBA	313
88	13	"Down the Tubes"	Gloria Ui Young Kim	Stephanie Kaliner	July 8, 2020	July 28, 2020	TBA	313
A new villain named Mr. Unpredictable challenges the Mobile Unit. The Odd Squad tube system has mysteriously been shut down.
89	14	"Sample of New York"	J. J. Johnson	Tim McKeon	July 9, 2020	August 4, 2020	TBA	314
89	14	"It's Not Easy Being Chill"	Heather Hawthorn Doyle	Stephanie Kaliner	July 9, 2020	August 4, 2020	TBA	314
The Mobile Unit reports to the New York City Odd Squad to help with a big problem. An agent-in-training visits the Mobile Unit.
90	15	"The Sandwich Project"	J. J. Johnson	Mark De Angelis	July 10, 2020	August 11, 2020	TBA	315
90	15	"Wax On Wax Odd"	Stefan Scaini	Matt Doyle	July 10, 2020	August 11, 2020	TBA	315
When members of the Mobile Unit get turned into sandwiches, The Big O comes to the rescue. The Mobile Unit faces a series of odd challenges that only Orla knows how to stop.
91	16	"Teach a Man to Ice Fish"	Melanie Orr	James Gangl	January 18, 2021	January 26, 2021	TBA	316
The Mobile Unit must teach the agents in the Odd Squad Arctic office how to solve a case for themselves.
92	17	"Oswald in the Machine"	Stephen Reynolds	Tom Conway	January 19, 2021	February 9, 2021	TBA	317
92	17	"The B-Team"	Madeleine Patton	Tom Conway	January 19, 2021	February 9, 2021	TBA	317
An Odd Squad gadget has been stolen and is being kept in a warehouse in Stockholm, Sweden run by robots; the team must take control of a robot and use coding to program it to retrieve the stolen gadget. The Big O tells the team what would have happened if she picked different agents to be in the mobile unit.
93	18	"The Weight Of the World Depends on Orla"	Warren P. Sonoda	Lakna Edilima	January 20, 2021	February 2, 2021	TBA	318
93	18	"Substitute Agents"	Stephanie Kaliner	Lakna Edilima	January 20, 2021	February 2, 2021	TBA	318
Orla shares the story of how she was chosen to protect the 44-leaf clover to stop Jellybean Joe from causing oddness to the Mobile Unit van. When OSMU gets trapped in a snow globe, Agents Oxley and Olanda come to the rescue.
94	19	"16 and a Half Blocks"	Melanie Orr	Lakna Edilima	January 21, 2021	February 16, 2021	TBA	319
94	19	"Follow the Leader"	Cole Bastedo	Lakna Edilima	January 21, 2021	February 16, 2021	TBA	319
Evil Sculptor wants to leave the Villain Network and offers to give the Mobile Unit top-secret info. OSMU goes undercover as villains at a hotel that the Shadow is staying at, to try and stop her.
95	20	"End of the Road"	J. J. Johnson	Mark De Angelis	January 22, 2021	February 23, 2021	TBA	320
With the help of a few agents and the Big O, the Odd Squad Mobile Unit must stop the Shadow from causing worldwide oddness.
96	21	"Odd Off the Press"	J. J. Johnson	Mark De Angelis	July 12, 2021	August 9, 2021	TBA	321
OSMU holds a press conference to introduce a new member named Osmeralda Kim since Opal had left. Meanwhile, the Big O announces she is going to space to help out the Odd Squad Space Unit.
97	22	"Box Trot"	Joyce Wong	Andrew De Angelis	July 13, 2021	August 10, 2021	TBA	322
97	22	"O for a Day"	Lisa Rose Snow	Stephanie Kaliner	July 13, 2021	August 10, 2021	TBA	322
The Mobile Unit tries to get rid of a box containing villain powers. The Mobile Unit is called in to help when Seattle Mr. O accidentally turns himself into a creature.
98	23	"H2 Oh No!"	J.J. Johnson	Lakna Edilima	July 14, 2021	August 11, 2021	TBA	323
98	23	"In Your Dreams"	Stefan Scaini	Eric Toth	July 14, 2021	August 11, 2021	TBA	323
Villain mastermind William Ocean plans to cover the entire world in water. The Dream Weaver turns Little O's dreams into nightmares.
99	24	"Mission O Possible"	Stefan Scaini	Mark De Angelis	July 15, 2021	August 12, 2021	TBA	324
99	24	"Nature of the Sandbeast"	Stefan Scaini	Eric Toth	July 15, 2021	August 12, 2021	TBA	324
As Jimmy Jam's Scrambler Machine scrambles Odd Squad communication, the villains plan to unleash oddness. Dr. Dry steals the Sandbeast's golden egg.
100	25	"Double O Trouble"	Joyce Wong	Mark De Angelis	December 31, 2021	September 29, 2021	TBA	325
An arts-and-crafts villain named Aarti Craft has turned all the agents in Chicago into paper dolls! Fortunately, two brand-new agents, Oxford and Osalind, avoided her powers. Now, the Mobile Unit must team up with them to stop Aarti for good.
101	26	"Can You Wrangle It?"	Jasmin Mozaffari	Lakna Edilima	December 31, 2021	September 30, 2021	TBA	326
101	26	"Ahead of the Times"	Karen Chapman	Sophia Fabiilli	December 31, 2021	September 30, 2021	TBA	326
With the Big O in space, the Xs are checking agents' licenses for fighting oddness. Orla and Oswald must get their creature-handling licenses - fast! The Puppy Master plans to turn everyone into puppies - including the Odd Squad Mobile Unit!
102	27	"The Problem with Pentagurps"	Stefan Scaini	Stephanie Kaliner	December 31, 2021	February 14, 2022	TBA	327
102	27	"Three Portals Down"	Lisa Rose Snow	Eric Toth	December 31, 2021	February 14, 2022	TBA	327
The Odd Squad Mail Department gets overrun by Pentagurps and the Mobile Unit comes to help. With Oswald and Osmeralda sick, Omar and Orla need two backup agents to help them solve a case at Shmumber Farms.
103	28	"Welcome to Odd Squad"	J. J. Johnson	Mark De Angelis & Adam Peltzman	December 31, 2021	February 21, 2022	TBA	328
Little O tries to make a training video, but the Sandbeast makes things difficult.
104	29	"Set Lasers to Profit"	Lora Campbell	Nelu Handa	July 4, 2022	July 7, 2022	TBA	329
104	29	"Villains Helping Villains"	Nicole Stamp	Tim McKeon	July 4, 2022	July 7, 2022	TBA	329
Three villains team up with Bonnie Blaster to help her use a new, very powerful gadget. With villains feeling irritated because of being defeated by Odd Squad, they trade tips on how to stop them.
105	30	"Monumental Oddness"	Faran Moradi	Lakna Edilima	July 5, 2022	April 20, 2022	TBA	330
105	30	"Party Crashers"	Asia Youngman	Adam Peltzman	July 5, 2022	April 20, 2022	TBA	330
The Mobile Unit must find missing national monuments when they have been turned into keychains by villain Stu Venir. When they come across a creature that can duplicate people, The Mobile Unit must figure out who the real Oswald is.
106	31	"Why Did the Chicken Cross the Dimension?"	Lisa Rose Snow	Andrew De Angelis	July 6, 2022	April 23, 2022	TBA	331
106	31	"Off the Clock"	Lisa Rose Snow	Lakna Edilima	July 6, 2022	April 23, 2022	TBA	331
The Mobile Unit must deal with a baby laser chicken found in the countryside of Austria. The Odd Squad Timekeeper keeps all the clocks in the world working. When she is struck with oddness, all the clocks stop.
107	32	"Sunny Sides Add Up"	Warren P. Sonoda	Sam Ruano	July 7, 2022	July 7, 2022	TBA	332
107	32	"Old Odd, New Tricks"	Warren P. Sonoda	Mark De Angelis	July 7, 2022	July 7, 2022	TBA	332
Orla, who believes she is the last ancient Agent, receives a distress call that challenges her assumption. Agent Olando has completed retraining and is ready to go out into the field with the Mobile Unit.
108	33	"Odd Together Now"	Warren P. Sonoda	Mark De Angelis & Tim McKeon	July 8, 2022	TBA	TBA	333
The Mobile Unit and Olando must stop a group of villains from stealing an artifact from an ancient Odd Squad headquarters. Little do they know that their biggest challenge yet lies within.

=== Season 4: UK (2024) ===
In October 2023, Odd Squad was renewed for a fourth season entitled Odd Squad: UK which began airing on October 1 2024. It was produced by Sinking Ship Entertainment, Fred Rogers Productions, and BBC Studios Kids and Family, in partnership with CBBC, TVO Kids, SRC and PBS Kids. It has a mostly British cast and is filmed in the United Kingdom, specifically in and around the Manchester area. It features Orli, a Niagara Falls agent who is transferred to partner with British agent Ozzie to help fight rapidly rising oddness rates in the UK.

No. overall	No. in season	Title	Directed by	Written by	American air date (PBS)	Canadian air date (TVO)	French air date (Radio-Canada)	Prod. code
109	1	"Odd Ones In"	Simon Massey	Mark De Angelis	October 1, 2024	October 9, 2024	September 14, 2025	401
When oddness spikes in the UK, Agent Ozzie calls for the world's best agent; Ozzie and Orli must team up to capture a loose creature and save HQ.
110	2	"A Dish Served Odd"	Simon Massey	Jon Macqueen	October 2, 2024	October 16, 2024	September 21, 2025	402
110	2	"Odd Jubilee"	Simon Massey	Paul Rose	October 2, 2024	October 16, 2024	September 21, 2025	402
Odd Squad must stop a villain who is turning things into delicious puddings. Odd Squad’s jubilee celebration is held up as the agents try to locate the missing Ozzie.
111	3	"The New Ozzie"	Simon Massey	Gemma Arrowsmith	October 3, 2024	October 23, 2024	September 28, 2025	403
111	3	"Bad-Luck-itis"	Simon Massey	Rob Evans	October 3, 2024	October 23, 2024	September 28, 2025	403
Opie starts her first day as the new Department of Help. The agents must find an antidote to cure Ozzie’s bad luck.
112	4	"The Triangle Sisters"	Simon Massey	Tasha Dhanraj	October 4, 2024	October 30, 2024	October 5, 2025	404
112	4	"Miss Information"	Simon Massey	Gemma Arrowsmith	October 4, 2024	October 30, 2024	October 5, 2025	404
When the museum reports missing shapes, Ozzie and Orli think they know the villains who are responsible. Miss Information uses bar graphs to spread false data about Odd Squad to the town.
113	5	"A Dicey Situation"	Simon Massey	Tasha Dhanraj	October 7, 2024	November 6, 2024	October 12, 2025	405
113	5	"Lift Off"	Simon Massey	Omar Khan	October 7, 2024	November 6, 2024	October 12, 2025	405
Captain O tells a story about when she faced Dottie Doubloon, who covered islands in polka dots. An interdimensional clam needs to be returned to its rightful home in the 60th dimension.
114	6	"A Tour of Odd Squad"	Carla Henry	Rob Evans	October 8, 2024	November 13, 2024	October 19, 2025	406
114	6	"Club 37"	Simon Massey	Omar Khan	October 8, 2024	November 13, 2024	October 19, 2025	406
Opie is hosting the Odd Squad Superfan tour but finds out a villain has joined in disguise. After finding out about Club 37, Orli and Ozzie must solve a total of 37 cases to be granted access.
115	7	"Odd Way Round"	Adam Jenkins	Niki Rooney	October 14, 2024	November 20, 2024	October 26, 2025	407
115	7	"Strictly Odd Dancing"	Adam Jenkins	Omar Khan	October 14, 2024	November 20, 2024	October 26, 2025	407
Orli must find her way to the Odd Squad Test Center, while villains try to stop her from making it on time. Agents Ostin and Olyla tell the story of their face off against The Music Maestro.
116	8	"Villain of the Year"	Adam Jenkins	Athena Kugblenu	October 15, 2024	November 27, 2024	November 2, 2025	408
116	8	"Planes, Trains, and Oddmobiles"	Adam Jenkins	Omar Khan	October 15, 2024	November 27, 2024	November 2, 2025	408
Odd Squad agents help an unlikely villain win the ultimate villain prize. An angry Huggle Monster wants her eggs back faster than Onom can deliver them.
117	9	"Part of the Furniture"	Adam Jenkins	Gemma Arrowsmith	October 21, 2024	December 4, 2024	November 9, 2025	409
117	9	"The Odd Ness Monster"	Adam Jenkins	Paul Rose	October 21, 2024	December 4, 2024	November 9, 2025	409
Orli has joined too many clubs but needs to help Orwell keep HQ running. Onom and Orwell must wait for The Odd Ness Monster to wake up to lure it back to sleep before it can destroy HQ.
118	10	"Oddtober the Thirteenth"	Krysten Resnick	Jon Macqueen	October 22, 2024	December 11, 2024	November 16, 2025	410
118	10	"Agent Overhill's Last Day"	Adam Jenkins	Athena Kugblenu	October 22, 2024	December 11, 2024	November 16, 2025	410
The agents organize a party for villains in order to have a day off from oddness. Agent Overhill is retiring but has one last villain to catch before the end of the day.
119	11	"The Other Ozzie"	Adam Jenkins	Jon Macqueen	October 23, 2024	December 16, 2024	November 23, 2025	411
119	11	"Three is the Oddest Number"	Adam Jenkins	Niki Rooney	October 23, 2024	December 16, 2024	November 23, 2025	411
Oz from the Movie Star dimension comes to help Orli find out who is turning the townspeople purple. The Terrible Three plot to steal three shapes from Odd Squad gadgets to stop Odd Squad for good.
120	12	"Should Odd Acquaintance Be Forgot"	Adam Jenkins	Tasha Dhanraj	October 24, 2024	December 25, 2024	November 30, 2025	412
The Terrible Three have broken into HQ and are planning ultimate oddness; Agents must close containment units all over town before oddness takes over the whole town.

=== Season 5: UK (2026) ===
No. overall	No. in season	Title	Directed by	Written by	American air date (PBS)	Canadian air date (TVO)	French air date (Radio-Canada)	Prod. code
121	1	"Blast From the Past"	Alex Carter	Mark De Angelis	April 6, 2026	May 2, 2026	TBA	501
122	2	"The Triangle Cafe"	Alex Carter Krysten Resnick	Tasha Dhanra Omar Khan	April 7, 2026	May 9, 2026	TBA	502
122	2	"Captain O's Birthday"	Alex Carter Krysten Resnick	Tasha Dhanra Omar Khan	April 7, 2026	May 9, 2026	TBA	502
123	3	"Bring a Grown-Up to Work Day"	Alex Carter Dominic Stephenson	Omar Khan Kathryn Bond	April 8, 2026	May 16, 2026	TBA	503
123	3	"Nice Day for an Odd Wedding"	Alex Carter Dominic Stephenson	Omar Khan Kathryn Bond	April 8, 2026	May 16, 2026	TBA	503
124	4	"The Good, The Great, and The Hungry"	Alex Carter Krysten Resnick	Lauren Huggins Anthony MacMurray	April 13, 2026	May 23, 2026	TBA	504
124	4	"The Rookie Run"	Alex Carter Krysten Resnick	Lauren Huggins Anthony MacMurray	April 13, 2026	May 23, 2026	TBA	504
125	5	"A Town Called Trifle"	Krysten Resnick Dominic Stephenson	Athena Kugblenu Carol Walsh	April 14, 2026	May 30, 2026	TBA	505
125	5	"I Am Oddius"	Krysten Resnick Dominic Stephenson	Athena Kugblenu Carol Walsh	April 14, 2026	May 30, 2026	TBA	505
126	6	"The Night Mayor"	Krysten Resnick Carla Henry	John Macqueen Athena Kugblenu	April 15, 2026	June 6, 2026	TBA	506
126	6	"The Big Stink"	Krysten Resnick Carla Henry	John Macqueen Athena Kugblenu	April 15, 2026	June 6, 2026	TBA	506
127	7	"Captain Cowboy"	Carla Henry Dominic Stephenson	Tasha Dhanraj Mark De Angelis	October 19, 2026	TBA	TBA	507
127	7	"The Time the Help Department Needed Help"	Carla Henry Dominic Stephenson	Tasha Dhanraj Mark De Angelis	October 19, 2026	TBA	TBA	507
128	8	"Ten Against One"	Carla Henry	Anthony MacMurray Laurence Clark	October 20, 2026	TBA	TBA	508
128	8	"Old Squad"	Carla Henry	Anthony MacMurray Laurence Clark	October 20, 2026	TBA	TBA	508
129	9	"The Other Orly"	Carla Henry Dominic Stephenson	Mark De Angelis Jon Macqueen	October 21, 2026	TBA	TBA	509
129	9	"Train of Fools"	Carla Henry Dominic Stephenson	Mark De Angelis Jon Macqueen	October 21, 2026	TBA	TBA	509
130	10	"Being Onom"	Carla Henry Dominic Stephenson	Joel Frosh Mark De Angelis	October 26, 2026	TBA	TBA	510
130	10	"Stop and Smell the Roses"	Carla Henry Dominic Stephenson	Joel Frosh Mark De Angelis	October 26, 2026	TBA	TBA	510
131	11	"Oddumentary"	Carla Henry Dominic Stephenson	Omar Khan Mark De Angelis	October 27, 2026	TBA	TBA	511
131	11	"I Love It When a Plan Barely Comes Together"	Carla Henry Dominic Stephenson	Omar Khan Mark De Angelis	October 27, 2026	TBA	TBA	511
132	12	"Cake Day"	Krysten Resnick	Mark De Angelis	October 28, 2026	TBA	TBA	512

== Specials ==
=== Odd Squad: The Movie (2016) ===
This is a movie written for the series which premiered on PBS Kids on August 1, 2016, with a one-day theatrical showing in Canada and limited screenings before its television premiere in the United States.

Title	Directed by	Written by	American premiere (PBS Kids)	Canadian premiere (theatrical release)
Odd Squad: The Movie	J. J. Johnson	Story by Mark De Angelis, Tim McKeon; Teleplay by Mark De Angelis, Tim McKeon, Adam Peltzman	August 1, 2016	July 16, 2016
Odd Squad is put out of business by a new rival organization, Weird Team, staffed by adults and run by a man who calls himself Weird Tom (Jack McBrayer). When Olympia (Anna Cathcart), Otis (Isaac Kragten), Ms. O (Millie Davis), and Oona (Olivia Presti) realize that Weird Tom's solutions are simply covering problems up, they call for backup from the previous agents, Olive (Dalila Bela), Otto (Filip Geljo), and Oscar (Sean Michael Kyer). Eventually, the problems—most glaringly, "Daves", creatures who multiply to form double their original number—are too much for even the Odd Squad agents, and they realize they must work together with every agent as well as the Weird Team to clear up a worldwide infestation of Daves. Special guests: Sean Cullen, Rizwan Manji, Sue Galloway, John Lutz, Keith Powell, Hannah Simone, Jack McBrayer Running time: 66 minutes

=== Odd Squad: World Turned Odd (2018) ===
World Turned Odd, a television special, premiered on January 15, 2018, on PBS.

Title	Directed by	Written by	American premiere (PBS Kids)	French Canadian Premiere (Radio-Canada)
World Turned Odd	J. J. Johnson	Tim McKeon	January 15, 2018	March 11, 2018
When the entire squad is celebrating a major milestone for Ms. O (Millie Davis) (100 years working for Odd Squad), Oona (Olivia Presti), Olympia (Anna Cathcart), and Otis (Isaac Kragten) decide to use a gadget to travel back to the 1980s to see when Ms. O passed her test to be promoted (depicted in the Season 1 episode, "Totally Odd Squad".) Unfortunately, their actions change the past when they accidentally flip a number on the outside of a building upside down when returning to the present. When they return, Odd Todd (Joshua Kilimnik) is now in charge of "Todd Squad" and is forcing agents to promote oddness instead of preventing it. In order to fix their mistake, the heroes must find a new gadget to go back and fix their mistake. Running time: 44 minutes

== OddTube ==
=== Season 1 (2016–17) ===
Agent Olympia (Anna Cathcart) hosted a weekly online video series called OddTube in which she answered questions from fans, toured interesting areas of the Odd Squad headquarters, and met with special guests.

# in series	# in season	Prod.	Release date	Title
1	1	101	November 10, 2016	"Welcome to OddTube Season One"
2	2	102	November 17, 2016	"What's Inside My Desk?"
3	3	103	November 24, 2016	"Villains and a Puppy"
4	4	104	December 1, 2016	"See It, Solve It"
5	5	105	December 1, 2016	"Pandas"
6	6	106	December 15, 2016	"Viral Video with Dr O"
7	7	107	December 22, 2016	"Your Questions"
8	8	108	December 29, 2016	"The O Song"
9	9	109	January 5, 2017	"Coach O's Life Tips"
10	10	110	January 12, 2017	"The Creature Room"
11	11	111	January 19, 2017	"Interview with Olive"
12	12	112	January 26, 2017	"Meet Agent Olo"
13	13	113	February 2, 2017	"Let's Get Historical"
14	14	114	February 9, 2017	"Your Questions: Part 2"
15	15	115	February 16, 2017	"How Odd is Odd Squad?"
16	16	116	February 23, 2017	"Oona Fills In"
17	17	117	March 2, 2017	"Otis Fills In"
18	18	118	March 9, 2017	"The Ball Pit"
19	19	119	March 16, 2017	"Your Gadgets + Tubes"
20	20	120	March 23, 2017	"20th Anniversary Video"

=== Season 2 (2020) ===
Season 2 of OddTube launched June 10, 2020, hosted by Agent Orla (Alyssa Hidalgo) in place of Olympia. It also launched a new game called OSMU Van Dashboard, coinciding with the season premiere. It was initially slated to premiere in the fall of 2020 but premiered sooner for an unknown reason.

# in series	# in season	Prod.	Release date	Title
21	1	201	June 10, 2020	"Welcome to OddTube Season Two"
22	2	202	June 17, 2020	"Van Secrets"
23	3	203	June 24, 2020	"Meet an Agent From Around the Globe"
24	4	204	July 1, 2020	"The Button Song"
25	5	205	July 8, 2020	"Know an O, Part One"
26	6	206	July 15, 2020	"Oswald's Favorite Rooms To Go To"
27	7	207	July 22, 2020	"The Pit Crew"
28	8	208	July 29, 2020	"Know an O, Part Two"
29	9	209	August 5, 2020	"Souvenir Time"
30	10	210	August 12, 2020	"Oddness in NYC"
31	11	211	August 19, 2020	"Know a Big O"
32	12	212	August 26, 2020	"Happy Twelve-iversary"

== Odd Squadcast (2020) ==
Odd Squadcast is a podcast launched November 18, 2020, hosted by The Big O (Millie Davis). The season was initially slated to premiere in the summer of 2020, but premiered later for an unknown reason.

# in series	# in season	Prod.	Release date	Title Big O's Happenings
0	0	100	November 18, 2020	"Introducing the Odd Squadcast!" (Promo)
1	1	101	December 2, 2020	"Episode 1”
2	2	102	December 2, 2020	"Episode 2"
3	3	103	December 9, 2020	"Episode 3"
4	4	104	December 9, 2020	"Episode 4"
5	5	105	December 16, 2020	"Episode 5"
6	6	106	December 23, 2020	"Episode 6"
7	7	107	December 30, 2020	"Episode 7"
