= 36th Young Artist Awards =

2015 US media awards ceremony

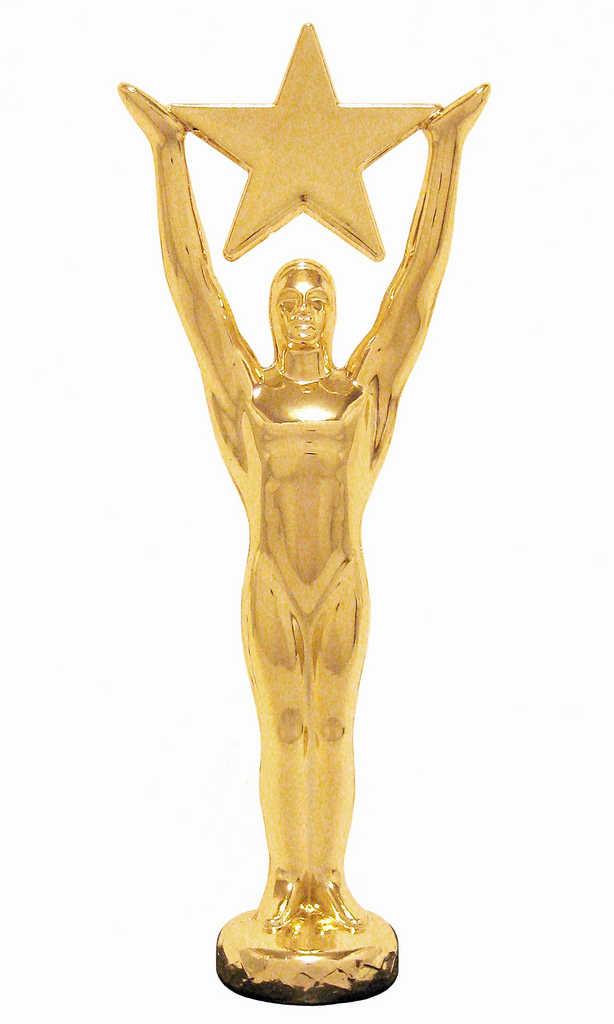
- Awarded for: Achievement during the year 2014 in film and television
- Date: May 15, 2015
- Site: Sportsmen's Lodge; Studio City, California
- Hosted by: Rider Strong and Sabrina Carpenter

The 36th Young Artist Awards ceremony, presented by the Young Artist Association, honored excellence of young performers between the ages of 5 and 21 in the fields of film, television, theatre and the internet for the 2014 calendar year. Winners were announced on May 15, 2015, at the annual ceremony and banquet luncheon held in the Empire Ballroom of the Sportsmen's Lodge in Studio City, California.

== Categories ==
★ Winners were announced on May 15, 2015.

== Best Performance in a Feature Film ==
=== Best Performance in a Feature Film – Leading Young Actor ===
★ Reese Hartwig — Earth to Echo — Panay Films

- Nathan Gamble — Dolphin Tale 2 — Alcon Entertainment
- Ed Oxenbould — Alexander and the Terrible, Horrible, No Good, Very Bad Day — Walt Disney Pictures

=== Best Performance in a Feature Film – Leading Young Actress ===
★ Quvenzhané Wallis — Annie — Marcy Media

- Elle Fanning — Maleficent — Walt Disney Pictures
- Cozi Zuehlsdorff — Dolphin Tale 2 — Alcon Entertainment

=== Best Performance in a Feature Film – Supporting Young Actor ===
★ John Paul Ruttan — RoboCop — Columbia Pictures

- Carson Bolde — Godzilla — Warner Brothers
- Max Charles — The Amazing Spider-Man 2 — Columbia Pictures
- Daniel Huttlestone — Into the Woods — Walt Disney Studios
- Aidan McGraw — American Sniper — Warner Brothers

=== Best Performance in a Feature Film – Supporting Young Actress ===
★ Lilla Crawford — Into the Woods — Walt Disney Studios

- Mackenzie Foy — Interstellar — Paramount Pictures
- Emma Fuhrmann — Blended — Warner Brothers
- Madeleine McGraw — American Sniper — Warner Brothers

=== Best Performance in a Feature Film – Young Ensemble Cast ===
★ Braxton Beckham, Emma Fuhrmann, Alyvia Alyn Lind, Kyle Red Silverstein, Bella Thorne — Blended — Warner Brothers

- Kerris Dorsey, Dylan Minnette, Ed Oxenbould — Alexander and the Terrible, Horrible, No Good, Very Bad Day — Walt Disney Pictures

== Best Performance in a Short Film ==
=== Best Performance in a Short Film – Young Actor ===
★ Christian Hutcherson — And Then We Laugh — Vlaptkin Productions

- Connor Beardmore — In Need of Caffeine — VBC
- Peter Bundic — The Dating Journal — L.O.T.G Productions
- Jadon Clews — Kemosabe — Ryerson Films
- Joshua Costea — The Dating Journal — L.O.T.G Productions

=== Best Performance in a Short Film – Young Actress ===
★ Katelyn Mager — Discovered — L.O.T.G Productions
★ Sofie Uretsky — Clinch — Sheridan Films

- Janette Bundic — The Dating Journal — L.O.T.G Productions
- Jeri Leader — The Spiked Watermelon — York University
- Abigail Wolff — The Watchers: The Darkness Outside — Highly Sober Productions

=== Best Performance in a Short Film – Young Actor 10 and Under ===
★ Blaze Tucker — Make It Rain — Meza Multimedia

- Devan Cohen — Behind the Door — York Films
- Richard Davis — Brothers — Sheridan Films
- Joshua Kaufman — Steel — Triserratops Productions
- David Raynolds — Albert — Joreel Productions
- Jonah Wineberg — Family Business — York University

=== Best Performance in a Short Film – Young Actress 10 and Under ===
★ Emily Delahunty — My Mom is an Alien — Independent

- Carla Costea — Molly – Young Movie Makers
- Maia Costea — The Battle — Joreel Productions
- Alyssa Cross — When Fish Fly — Organic Water Productions
- Peyton Kennedy — Dorsal — Ryerson Image Artists
- Madeline Lupi — Milkshake — Cinema Kography
- Isabella Piombini — At the Doctor's — Tarlington Films
- Cadence Schuster — Florence and the Fish — York Films
- Katie Silverman — Raw Head + Bloody Bones — Mer-Made Productions

== Best Performance in a TV Movie, Miniseries, Special or Pilot ==
=== Best Performance in a TV Movie, Miniseries, Special or Pilot – Young Actor ===
★ Samuel Patrick Chu — Zapped — Disney Channel

- Joey Luthman — Finders Keepers — SyFy
- Donnie MacNeil — Zapped — Disney Channel
- Christian Martyn — The Christmas Parade — Hallmark
- Ty Parker — Mt. Happy — ABC

=== Best Performance in a TV Movie, Miniseries, Special or Pilot – Young Actress ===
★ Emilia McCarthy — Zapped — Disney Channel

- Olivia Steele-Falconer — The Tree That Saved Christmas — Up TV Network
- Jennifer Jolliff — It Only Happens with Rose — Moe Entertainment
- Jordyn Ashley Olson — The Christmas Shepherd — Hallmark
- Tiera Skovbye — The Unauthorized Saved by the Bell Story — Lifetime

=== Best Performance in a TV Movie, Miniseries, Special or Pilot – Young Actor 13 and Under ===
★ Darien Provost — The Town That Came A-Courtin' — Up TV Network

- John Alyn — Peter Pan Live! — NBC
- Jake Lucas — Peter Pan Live! — NBC
- Valin Shinyei — Along Came a Nanny — Hallmark

=== Best Performance in a TV Movie, Miniseries, Special or Pilot – Young Actress 11 and Under ===
★ Sydney Mikayla — The Gabby Douglas Story — Lifetime

- Jaeda Lily Miller — The Christmas Secret — Hallmark
- Gracyn Shinyei — A Cookie Cutter Christmas — Hallmark
- Jena Skodje — Along Came a Nanny — Hallmark
- Alissa Skovbye — One Christmas Eve — Hallmark

== Best Performance in a TV Series ==
=== Best Performance in a TV Series – Leading Young Actor ===
★ Kolton Stewart — Some Assembly Required — YTV
★ Benjamin Stockham — About A Boy — NBC

- Max Burkholder — Parenthood — NBC
- Lyle Lettau — Degrassi: The Next Generation — CTV

=== Best Performance in a TV Series – Leading Young Actress ===
★ Paris Smith — Every Witch Way — Nickelodeon

- Dalila Bela — Odd Squad — PBS
- Millie Davis — Odd Squad — PBS
- Addison Holley — Annedroids — Amazon
- Emilia McCarthy — Max & Shred — Nickelodeon

=== Best Performance in a TV Series – Supporting Young Actor ===
★ Evan & Ryder Londo — Sons of Anarchy — FX
★ Eric Osborne — Degrassi: The Next Generation — CTV

- Miles Brown — Black-ish — ABC
- Pierce Gagnon — Extant — CBS
- Keidrich Sellati — The Americans — FX

=== Best Performance in a TV Series – Supporting Young Actress ===
★ Holly Taylor — The Americans — FX

- Adrianna Di Liello — Annedroids — Amazon
- Marsai Martin — Black-ish — ABC
- Savannah Paige Rae — Parenthood — NBC

=== Best Performance in a TV Series – Guest Starring Young Actor 15-21 ===
★ Joey Luthman — The Goldbergs — ABC

- Nicholas Azarian — The McCarthys — CBS
- Samuel Patrick Chu — R.L. Stine's The Haunting Hour — The Hub Network
- Jake Elliott — Ray Donovan — Showtime
- Dalton E. Gray — American Horror Story — FX
- Zachary Mitchell — Girl Meets World — Disney Channel

=== Best Performance in a TV Series – Guest Starring Young Actress 17-21 ===
★ Zoé De Grand Maison — Motive — CTV

- Laine MacNeil — Strange Empire — CBC
- Chanel Marriott — Hawaii Five-0 — CBS

=== Best Performance in a TV Series – Guest Starring Young Actress 14-16 ===
★ Johnnie Ladd — Melissa & Joey — ABC Family

- Ava Allan — The Middle — ABC
- Katherine Evans — Intruders — BBC America
- Jessica Lonardo — Swamp Murders — ID Channel
- Emily Robinson — Scorpion — CBS

=== Best Performance in a TV Series – Guest Starring Young Actor 11-14 ===
★ Rio Mangini — Good Luck Charlie — Disney Channel

- Nick Cuthbertson — Mr. D — CBC
- Justin Ellings — CSI: Crime Scene Investigation — CBS
- John Paul Ruttan — Saving Hope — CTV

=== Best Performance in a TV Series – Guest Starring Young Actress 11-13 ===
★ Olivia Steele-Falconer — R.L. Stine's The Haunting Hour — The Hub Network

- Ella Ballentine — Reign — The CW
- Julia Lalonde — Heartland — CBC

=== Best Performance in a TV Series – Guest Starring Young Actor 10 and Under ===
★ Albert Tsai — Benched — USA Network

- Thomas Barbusca — Friends with Better Lives — FOX
- Shannon Brown — Extant — CBS
- Samuel Faraci — Hannibal — Gaumont International Television
- Jack Fulton — Saving Hope — CTV
- Zachary Haven — My Haunted House — Lifetime

=== Best Performance in a TV Series – Guest Starring Young Actress 10 and Under ===
★ Layla Crawford — True Blood — HBO
★ Afra Sophia Tully — Legit — FX

- Michela Luci — Odd Squad — PBS
- Morgan McGarry — The Mysteries of Laura — NBC
- Jaeda Lily Miller — Some Assembly Required — YTV

=== Best Performance in a TV Series – Recurring Young Actor 17-21 ===
★ Brock Ciarlelli — The Middle — ABC

- Connor Beardmore — The Killing — FOX
- Daniel Polo — The Bridge — FX
- Richard Walters — Degrassi: The Next Generation — CTV

=== Best Performance in a TV Series – Recurring Young Actress 17-21 ===
★ Frédérique Dufort — Unité 9 — Radio Canada TV

- Jaylen Barron — Good Luck Charlie — Disney Channel
- Kiersey Clemons — Transparent — Amazon
- Zoé De Grand Maison — Orphan Black — BBC America
- Kelly Heyer — Raising Hope — FOX

=== Best Performance in a TV Series – Recurring Young Actor ===
★ Sean Michael Kyer — When Calls the Heart — Hallmark

- Jaden Betts — Scandal — ABC
- Brendan Heard — Odd Squad — PBS
- Matt Tolton — Mr. D — CBC
- Robbie Tucker — See Dad Run — Nickelodeon
- Tai Urban — Shameless — Showtime

=== Best Performance in a TV Series – Recurring Young Actress 14-16 ===
★ Emily Robinson — Transparent — Amazon

- Brielle Barbusca — Scandal — ABC
- Katherine Evans — The Killing — FOX
- Ally Ioannides — Parenthood — NBC
- Danika Yarosh — Shameless — Showtime

=== Best Performance in a TV Series – Recurring Young Actress 11-13 ===
★ Stephanie Katherine Grant — The Goldbergs — ABC

- Lizzie Boys — When Calls the Heart — Hallmark
- Julia Lalonde — Odd Squad — PBS
- Katelyn Mager — When Calls the Heart — Hallmark
- Kassidy Mattera — Mr. D — CBC

=== Best Performance in a TV Series – Recurring Young Actor 10 and Under ===
★ Thomas Barbusca — Grey's Anatomy — ABC

- Christian Distefano — Odd Squad — PBS
- Armani Jackson — Grey's Anatomy — ABC

=== Best Performance in a TV Series – Recurring Young Actress 10 and Under ===
★ Peyton Kennedy — Odd Squad — PBS
★ Mamie Laverock — When Calls the Heart — Hallmark
★ Sunnie Pelant — Bones — FOX

- Siena Agudong — Killer Women — ABC
- Isabella Kai Rice — True Blood — HBO
- Gracyn Shinyei — When Calls the Heart — Hallmark

=== Outstanding Young Ensemble in a TV Series ===
★ Adrianna Di Liello, Jadiel Dowlin, Addison Holley — Annedroids — Amazon

- Rowan Blanchard, Sabrina Carpenter, August Maturo, Peyton Meyer — Girl Meets World — Disney Channel
- Dalila Bela, Millie Davis, Filip Geljo, Sean Michael Kyer — Odd Squad — PBS

== Best Performance in a Voice-Over Role ==
=== Best Performance in a Voice-Over Role – Young Actor ===
★ Stuart Allan — Son of Batman — Warner Brothers Animation

- Jaden Betts — Doc McStuffins — Disney Channel
- Joshua Carlon — Sofia the First — Disney Junior
- Valin Shinyei — Frozen in Time — Cartoon Network
- Alex Thorne — PAW Patrol — Nickelodeon

=== Best Performance in a Voice-Over Role – Young Actress ===
★ Lilly Bartlam — PAW Patrol — Nickelodeon

- Amariah Faulkner — Creative Galaxy — Amazon
- Bailey Gambertoglio — Bubble Guppies — Nickelodeon
- Sarah Sheppard — Doki — Discovery Kids
- Berkley Silverman — PAW Patrol — Nickelodeon
- Brooke Wolloff — Tumble Leaf — Amazon

=== Best Performance in a Voice-Over Role – Young Actor 10 and Under ===
★ Devan Cohen — PAW Patrol — Nickelodeon
★ Christopher Downs — Tumble Leaf — Amazon

- Max Calinescu — PAW Patrol — Nickelodeon
- Christian Distefano — PAW Patrol — Nickelodeon
- Zac McDowell — Tumble Leaf — Amazon
- Jaxon Mercey — Daniel Tiger's Neighborhood — PBS

== Best Performance in a Film for DVD ==
★ Mandalynn Carlson — Small Town Santa — Screen Media Films

- Jet Jurgensmeyer — The Little Rascals Save the Day — Universal Pictures Home Entertainment
- John Paul Ruttan — Shelby: The Dog Who Saved Christmas — Anchor Bay Entertainment

== Best Web Performance ==
=== Best Web Performance – Young Actor ===
★ Austin James Wolff — Dead Souls — Independent

- Jack Fulton — Hemlock Grove — Netflix
- William Leon — Camouflage — Project Studios 505
- Zach Louis — Camp Abercorn — Gray Oak Productions

=== Best Web Performance – Young Actress ===
★ Jessica Mikayla Adams — Reel Kids — HD Films

- Sage Boatright — Boozy Mom — Independent
- Isabelle Dubroy — Microchip Jones — Independent
- Elise Luthman — Beachwood Charter — Harrison Productions
- Kayla Servi — Comet — IFC Films
- Shae Smolik — Microchip Jones — Independent

== Best Performance in Live Theater ==
=== Best Performance in Live Theater – Young Actor ===
★ Alexander Davis — A Christmas Story — Neptune Theatre, Halifax

- Robin de Zwart — Chitty Chitty — Island Discovery Theatre, Vancouver
- Graham Verchere — Mary Poppins — Stanley Theatre, Vancouver
- Toby Verchere — The Old Curiosity Shop — Jericho Arts Centre, Vancouver

=== Best Performance in Live Theater – Young Actress ===
★ Lily Killam — Les Misérables — Chemainus Theatre, B.C. Canada

- Alora Killam — My Fair Lady — South Island Musical Theatre, B.C. Canada
- Jeri Leader — Seussical The Musical — Lower Ossington Theatre, Toronto

== Special awards ==
=== The Maureen Dragone Scholarship Award ===
★ Actors For Autism — Opening Doors of Opportunity, Creating Possibilities

=== Jackie Coogan Award – Contribution to Youth ===
★ Nellee Holmes – HFPA — Excellence in Journalism, Celebrating Young Artists

=== Mickey Rooney Award – Lifetime Achievement ===
★ Rider Strong — Shawn Hunter from ABC's "Boy Meets World"

=== Social Relations of Knowledge Institute Award ===
★ Cosmos: A Spacetime Odyssey with Neil deGrasse Tyson — FOX & National Geographic
