= Dalila Bela =

Canadian actress (born 2001)

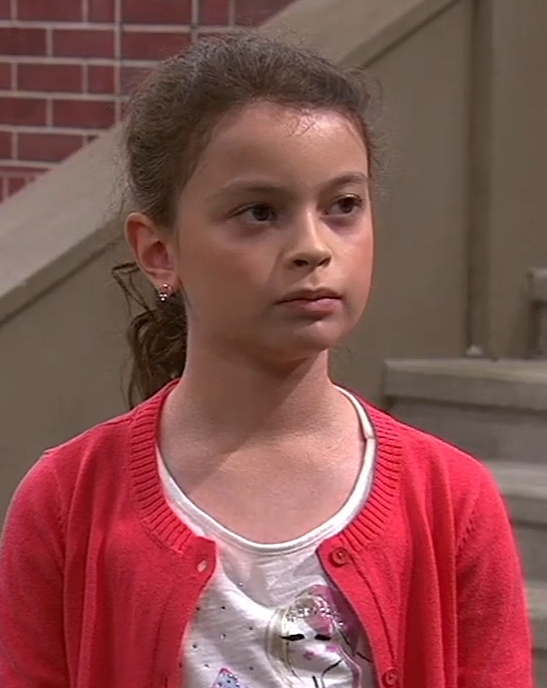
- Bela in Mr. Young (2012)
- Born: Dalia Caballero Meranu; October 5, 2001 (age 24); Montreal, Quebec, Canada
- Occupation: Actress
- Years active: 2009–present
- Known for: Odd Squad; Anne with an E
- Relatives: Bruce Salomon (brother); Raphael Alejandro (brother)

Dalila Bela (born October 5, 2001) is a Canadian-American actress who is known for her role as Agent Olive on the TVOKids/PBS Kids series Odd Squad (2014–16), the voice of Sydney in the PBS Kids animated series Ready Jet Go! (2016–17), a minor role as Taylor Pringle in the Diary of a Wimpy Kid sequels (2011–12), and her breakthrough as Diana Berry in the Netflix/CBC series Anne with an E (2017–19) as well as appearances on The 100 (2014) and Once Upon a Time (2015).

== Personal life ==
Dalila Bela was born Dalila Caballero Meranu in Montreal, Quebec. She is of mixed English, French, Brazilian, Panamanian and Spanish ancestry. Her father is from Panama, and her mother is from Brazil. She has two younger brothers named Bruce and Raphael, who are also actors. She is currently attending UCLA studying for a degree in psychology.

== Career ==
Bela began her career in acting at the age of five when she first appeared on a national commercial. A year later, she won Best Actor of the Year, and moved with her family to Vancouver. Following her move, she won the Young Artist Award for best performance in a direct to video film, entitled The Stranger. In both 2011 and 2012, she was awarded the Young Artist Award for her work in Joanna Makes a Friend.

Bela won the 2015 Joey Awards for Best Young Ensemble in a TV Series for her breakout starring role in Odd Squad, sharing the award with her Odd Squad co-stars. Additionally, she has received accolades for her role of Lola Littleton in Dead Hearts at the Diabolique Film Festival Award.

She portrayed Diana Barry in the series Anne with an E by CBC and Netflix (USA), based on the book Anne of Green Gables.

== Filmography ==
=== Films ===
Year	Title	Role	Notes
2010	The Stranger	Granddaughter	
2011	Joanna Makes a Friend	Joanna	
2011	Red Riding Hood	Man's daughter	
2011	Diary of a Wimpy Kid: Rodrick Rules	Taylor Pringle	
2012	Diary of a Wimpy Kid: Dog Days	Taylor Pringle	
2012	Grave Encounters 2	Kaitlin	
2012	A Christmas Story 2	Kid in Line #3	
2013	That Burning Feeling	Queenetta	
2016	Odd Squad: The Movie	Agent Olive	
2016	The Adventure Club	Sandy	
2021	Pil's Adventures	Pil (voice)	US version

=== Television ===
Year	Title	Role	Notes
2009	Mrs. Miracle	Young girl	
2009	Supernatural	Little girl	Episode: "I Believe the Children Are Our Future"
2009	Fringe	Jenny Burgess	Episode: "Fracture"
2010	R. L. Stine's The Haunting Hour: The Series	Jealous girl	Episode: "Really You: Part 1"
2012	A Fairly Odd Christmas	Jingle Jill Elf	Television film
2012	It's Christmas, Carol!	Young Carol	Television film
2012	Mr. Young	Lucy Roboto	Episode: "Mr. & Mrs. Roboto"
2014	The 100	Child/Leigh	Episode: "Unity Day"
2014–2016; 2022	Odd Squad	Agent Olive	Main role
2015	Once Upon a Time	Young Guinevere	Episode: "The Broken Kingdom"
2016	Annedroids	Lisa	Episode: "Teacher's Pal"
2016–2017	Ready Jet Go!	Sydney Skelley (voice)	Main role
2017–2019	Anne with an E	Diana Barry	Main role
2021	Doug Unplugs	Miss Molly (voice)	Episode: "Camper Bots / Bots to Read"

== Awards and nominations ==
Year	Award	Category	Work	Result	Ref.
2010	Young Artist Awards	Best Performance in a TV Series – Guest Starring Young Actress	Supernatural	Nominated	
2011	Young Artist Awards	Best Performance in a Short Film – Young Actress Ten and Under	Kid's Court	Nominated	
2011	Young Artist Awards	Best Performance in a DVD Film – Young Actress	The Stranger	Won	
2012	Young Artist Awards	Best Performance in a Feature Film – Young Actress Ten and Under	Diary of a Wimpy Kid: Rodrick Rules	Nominated	
2012	Young Artist Awards	Best Performance in a Short Film – Young Actress Ten and Under	Joanna Makes a Friend	Won	
2012	Leo Awards	Best Performance by a Female in a Short Drama	Joanna Makes a Friend	Nominated	
2013	Young Artist Awards	Best Performance in a TV Movie, Miniseries, Special or Pilot – Supporting Young Actress	A Fairly Odd Christmas	Nominated	
2013	Young Artist Awards	Best Performance in a Feature Film – Supporting Young Actress Ten and Under	Diary of a Wimpy Kid: Dog Days	Nominated	
2014	Diabolique Film Festival Award	Best Actress	Dead Hearts	Won	
2015	Young Artist Awards	Outstanding Young Ensemble in a TV Series (with Millie Davis, Filip Geljo and Sean Michael Kyer)	Odd Squad	Nominated	
2015	Young Artist Awards	Best Performance in a TV Series- Leading Young Actress	Odd Squad	Nominated	
2015	Joey Awards	Best Young Ensemble in a TV Series (shared with the cast of Odd Squad)	Odd Squad	Won	
2016	Young Artist Awards	Outstanding Young Ensemble Cast in a Television Series (shared with Millie Davis, Filip Geljo and Sean Michael Kyer)	Odd Squad	Nominated	
2016	Canadian Screen Awards	Best Performance in a Children's or Youth Program or Series	Odd Squad	Nominated	
2016	Imagen Awards	Best Young Actor – Television	Odd Squad	Nominated	
2016	Joey Awards	Best Young Ensemble in a TV Series (shared with the cast of Odd Squad)	Odd Squad	Nominated	
2019	ACTRA Toronto Awards	Outstanding Performance – Ensemble	Anne with an E	Nominated	
