= Isaac Kragten =

Canadian actor (born 2002)

- Born: May 16, 2002 (age 23); Caledonia, Ontario, Canada
- Occupation: Actor
- Years active: 2015–present
- Family: Hattie Kragten (sister)

Isaac Kragten is a Canadian actor. He is best known for his role as Agent Otis in Odd Squad for which he won the Daytime Emmy Award for Outstanding Performer in a Children's, Pre-School Children's or Family Viewing Program at the 44th Daytime Emmy Awards. He also portrayed Josh in Breakthrough.

== Early life ==
Isaac Kragten was born in Caledonia, Ontario. He has an older brother and a younger sister, Hattie Kragten, an actress who has appeared in Snoopy in Space and Abby Hatcher among other roles.

== Career ==
Kragten was found through dance competitions when a judge of the competition offered to give Kragten an agent. He began his acting career in 2015 when he appeared in an episode of Rookie Blue. Kragten later appeared as Agent Otis in the PBS Kids/TVOKids educational, comedy series Odd Squad. He reprised his role as Agent Otis in Odd Squad: The Movie, marking his first theatrical appearance.

== Filmography ==
=== Films ===
Year	Title	Role	Notes
2016	Odd Squad: The Movie	Agent Otis	Television film with limited theatrical release
2016	Total Frat Movie	Young Billy	
2017	Anne of Green Gables: Fire and Dew	Moody Spurgeon	Television film
2018	Odd Squad: World Turned Odd	Agent Otis	Television film
2019	Breakthrough	Josh	
2020	The War with Grandpa	Steve	
2020	The Kid Detective	Billy	
2022	Luckiest Girl Alive	Liam Ross	
2025	Nika and Madison	Ben	
2026	Mama's Little Murderer	Anthony	Television film

=== Television ===
Year	Title	Role	Notes
2015	Rookie Blue	Hip Hop Kid #2	Episode: "Letting Go"
2016–2019	Odd Squad	Agent Otis	35 episodes
2016–2017	OddTube	Agent Otis	5 episodes
2018	Taken	Young Bryan Mills	Episode: "Quarry"
2024	Mistletoe Murders	Pete	2 episodes
2025	Shoresy	Jack	6 episodes
2025	Bet	Ricky	Episode: "House Wars"
2026	Doc	Chris	2 episodes

== Awards and nominations ==
Year	Award	Category	Work	Result	Ref.
2017	Daytime Emmy Awards	Outstanding Performer in a Children's, Pre-School Children's or Family Viewing Program	Odd Squad	Won	
2019	Youth Media Alliance	Outstanding Youth Performer	Odd Squad	Nominated	
2019	Canadian Screen Awards	Best Performance in a Children's or Youth Program or Series	Odd Squad	Nominated	
