= It's Christmas, Carol! =

2012 television film

It's Christmas, Carol!, a 2012 adaptation of Charles Dickens' 1843 novella A Christmas Carol, premiered on the Hallmark Channel on November 18, 2012. The film stars Emmanuelle Vaugier, Carrie Fisher, and Carson Kressley.

== Plot ==
Carol, a bitter workaholic Chief executive officer, gets a wake up call from her deceased boss and predecessor Eve. Eve appears as the three different ghosts of Christmas (Past, Present, and Future) due to budget cuts in the afterlife. In the end, Carol realizes what she'd lost over the years and changes her ways.

== Cast ==
- Emmanuelle Vaugier as Carol Huffler
  - Dalila Bela as Young Carol
  - Karin Konoval as Older Carol
- Carrie Fisher as Eve Mailer
- Carson Kressley as Fred
- Tygh Runyan as Ben Woodley
- Olivia Cheng as Kendra
- Susan Hogan as Linda Huffler

== See also ==
- Adaptations of A Christmas Carol
- List of Christmas films
