= Lamya's Poem =

2021 animated adventure film directed by Alex Kronemer

- Film poster
- Directed by: Alex Kronemer; Brandon Lloyd (animation/art)
- Written by: Alex Kronemer
- Produced by: Sam Kadi; Glenn James Brown; Alex Kronemer
- Starring: Millie Davis; Faran Tahir; Aya Bryn; Mena Massoud
- Music by: Christopher Willis
- Production companies: Unity Productions Foundation; PiP Animation Services
- Distributed by: WestEnd Films; ICM Partners
- Release date: June 14, 2021 (Annecy)
- Running time: 89 minutes
- Countries: Canada; United States
- Language: English

Lamya's Poem is a 2021 animated adventure film, directed and written by Alex Kronemer. The film stars Mena Massoud, Millie Davis and Faran Tahir.

== Premise ==
The film centres on Lamya, a young Syrian girl who has left her hometown of Aleppo as a refugee during the Syrian civil war, who finds solace in her inner fantasy life as she reads and is inspired by the poetry of Rumi.

== Cast ==
- Mena Massoud as Rumi
- Millie Davis as Lamya
- Faran Tahir as Baha Walad
- Aya Bryn as Lamya's Mother
- Raoul Bhaneja as Mr. Hamadani / Smuggler
- Nissae Isen as Bassam

== Release ==
An excerpt from the film was screened at the 2020 Annecy International Animation Film Festival in the Works in Progress stream, before the completed film premiered at Annecy in 2021. WestEnd Films has international distribution rights, while ICM Partners holds North American rights.

Freestyle Digital Media acquired the North American DVD and VOD rights and released the film on digital HD online, cable, and satellite platforms on February 21, 2023.

On review aggregator Rotten Tomatoes, Lamya's Poem has an approval rating of 90% based on 10 reviews with an average rating of 7 out of 10.
