= Sean Michael Kyer =

Canadian child actor (born 2001)

- Born: July 31, 2001 (age 25); Vancouver, British Columbia, Canada
- Other name: Sean Kyer
- Occupation: Actor
- Years active: 2010-2017
- Known for: Odd Squad
- Website: seankyer.com

Sean Michael Kyer (born July 31, 2001) is a Canadian former child actor who played the role of Oscar in 51 episodes of the children's live action educational television series Odd Squad from 2014 until 2017. Kyer has also appeared in the series Continuum as Sam Cameron and When Calls the Heart as Albert Bickley.

== Career ==
Sean Michael Kyer was born on July 31, 2001, in Vancouver, British Columbia, Canada, where he began a minor acting career as an infant. His first television role was at the age of 9, when he played "Brian" in a season 1 episode of the sci-fi television series V in 2010. Kyer obtained more slight roles in television namely discrete roles in episodes of Fringe, Alcatraz, Falling Skies, Cedar Cove and Supernatural. His first film role was in the film Girl in Progress. He also had a voice role in the TV movie A Fairly Odd Christmas. He appeared on two episodes of R.L. Stine's: The Haunting Hour as two different characters. Afterwards, Kyer had a main character part on 10 episodes of Continuum and as Oscar in Odd Squad from 2014 to 2017. In addition to those roles Kyer had a recurring role in 7 episodes of When Calls The Heart between 2014 and 2015.

In 2016, Kyer won a Leo award for his role as Oscar in Odd Squad.

== Filmography ==
Film and Television
Year(s)	Title	Role	Notes
2010	V	Brian	Acting debut
2011	Fringe	Jonathan Dazig	
2012	Alcatraz	Liam Callahan	
2012	Continuum	Sam Cameron	10 episodes
2012	Girl in Progress	Hartford's son	Film
2012	Emily Owens M.D	Sam	
2012	A Fairly Odd Christmas	Pissy Elf	Television film
2013	Rapture-Palooza	Grandchild #2	Film; credited as Sean Kyer
2013	Cedar Cove	Eddie Weston	
2013	Spooksville	Marvin the Magnificent	
2013	Supernatural	Timmy	
20132014	R.L. Stine's The Haunting Hour	Miller/Sam Berkley	2 episodes
2014–2015	When Calls the Heart	Albert Bickley	7 episodes
2014–2016	Odd Squad	Agent Oscar	51 episodes
2016	Annedroids	Jason	”Teacher’s Pals”
2016	Timeless	John Smith	
2016	Odd Squad: The Movie	Agent Oscar	Television film
