= The Stranger (2010 film) =

2010 film by Quinn Scott

- DVD cover
- Directed by: Robert Lieberman
- Written by: Quinn Scott
- Produced by: Jack Nasser
- Starring: Steve Austin; Erica Cerra; Adam Beach; Ron Lea; Viv Leacock; Jason Schombing; Stephen Dimopoulos
- Cinematography: Peter F. Woeste
- Edited by: Jamie Alain
- Music by: Peter Allen
- Production companies: NGN Productions; Nasser Group
- Distributed by: Nasser Group
- Release date: June 1, 2010
- Running time: 90 minutes
- Countries: Canada; United States
- Language: English

The Stranger is a 2010 Canadian-American action film written by Quinn Scott, directed by Robert Lieberman, and starring former WWE wrestler Steve Austin. The film was released on direct-to-DVD and Blu-ray in the United States on June 1, 2010.

== Plot ==
A mysterious stranger (Steve Austin) has to remember what happened to his family, career, and past life while the FBI Agent Mason Reese (Adam Beach) on his trail.

== Cast ==
- Steve Austin as Tom "The Stranger" Tomashevsky
- Erica Cerra as Dr. Grace Bishop
- Adam Beach as Mason Reese
- Ron Lea as FBI Chief Ronald Picker
- Viv Leacock as Agent Fleming
- Jason Schombing as Agent Daniels
- Stephen Dimopoulos as Mikhail Korchekov

== Production ==
It is set and filmed in Vancouver, British Columbia, Canada in 31 days on January 2 and February 2, 2009. PG 13 Rating. The Stranger Debuted on # 4 on DVD Box office releases and sold 177000 DVD units in a month.
