= Odd Squad =

Canadian educational comedy television series

- Genre: Educational; Comedy
- Created by: Tim McKeon; Adam Peltzman
- Written by: Tim McKeon
- Starring: Dalila Bela; Filip Geljo; Millie Davis; Sean Michael Kyer; Anna Cathcart; Isaac Kragten; Olivia Presti; Valentina Herrera; Jayce Alexander; Gavin MacIver-Wright; Alyssa Hidalgo; Glee Dango; Shazdeh Kapadia; Alexander Shaw; Asha Soetan; Shelly Lagodinsky; Samir Simon-Keegan; Alexander Joseph; Zach Bent; Halle Brady; Mimi Soetan; Dalton Jones
- Composer: Paul Buckley
- Countries of origin: Canada; United States; United Kingdom (seasons 4–5)
- Original language: English
- No. of seasons: 5
- No. of episodes: 132 (list of episodes)

Production
- Executive producers: J. J. Johnson; Tim McKeon; Adam Peltzman; Blair Powers; Paul Siefken
- Producers: Matthew J.R. Bishop; Georgina Lopez; Ellen Doherty
- Production locations: Toronto, Ontario; Manchester, UK (seasons 4–5)
- Editors: Jennifer Essex-Chew; Courtney Goldman; Christopher Minns; Laura Bower
- Running time: 20-26 minutes (two paired 10-13 minute segments per half-hour program)
- Production companies: Fred Rogers Productions; Sinking Ship Entertainment; BBC Studios Kids & Family (season 4–5)

Original release
- Network: TVOKids (Canada, English); Ici Radio-Canada Télé (Canada, French); PBS Kids (United States); CBBC (United Kingdom)
- Release: November 26, 2014 – present

Odd Squad (stylized in all caps) is a live action children's educational comedy television series created by Tim McKeon and Adam Peltzman. The series premiered on TVOKids in Canada and PBS Kids in the United States on November 26, 2014. Similar to Cyberchase and Peg + Cat, the series involves child characters using mathematical concepts (addition, multiplication, using data in graphs, etc.) to advance each episode's plot. The series features child actors (whose characters are the employees of the "Odd Squad") who use indirect reasoning and basic math to solve and investigate strange happenings in their town.

== Description ==
The series follows the exploits of Odd Squad, an organization run entirely by children, that solves peculiar problems using math skills. In the first two seasons, it typically features two employees of the organization's investigation division that work in precinct 13579 of the organization—Agents Olive (Dalila Bela) and Otto (Filip Geljo) in the first season and Olympia (Anna Cathcart) and Otis (Isaac Kragten) in the second season. Selected episodes feature other types of employees of the fictional organization, like security officers, so-called "tube operators" and scientists. The names of the employees nearly always start with the letter O. Agents are typically assigned cases by their boss, Ms. O (Millie Davis), and travel via a system of interconnected tubes to get to their destinations. They deduce the solution to the problem or how to detain the perpetrator by using basic mathematical principles that are typically the focus of the episode. Often, they cannot solve the problem at the scene and must go back to their precinct's headquarters or to the "Mathroom", a sentient space that communicates through large paper fortune tellers and can unfold them to display information to help the agents see connections and better solve their case. Along with math, agents also use "gadgets" designed by the scientists; in the first season, Agent Oscar (Sean Michael Kyer) heads the lab, gaining an assistant, Agent Oona (Olivia Presti), in early season two who eventually takes over the lab after Oscar is promoted.

The characters have to deal with a variety of recurring villains who often put a mathematical spin on their plots. The third season, dubbed Odd Squad Mobile Unit, sees a setting change from precinct 13579 to a van; in this season, four agents are assigned by the Big O (Davis) to work in the van and travel the world solving cases where local precincts either can't reach or need extra help. The fourth season, dubbed Odd Squad UK, is set in an Odd Squad location in the United Kingdom. A fifth season premiered in 2026, set in the same UK precinct as Season 4 and focused on the same two agents as Season 4 as well as two new agents. The fifth season had a heavier sci-fi theme.

== Cast and characters ==
Character	Portrayed by	Appearances						
Character	Portrayed by	Season 1	Season 2	Season 3		Season 4	Season 5	Specials
Character	Portrayed by	Season 1	Season 2	3A	3B	Season 4	Season 5	Specials
Agent Olive	Dalila Bela	Main (Note: Bela and Geljo are credited as main cast members until the first episode of season 2, "First Day", where they depart the series.)	Main		Guest (Note: These actors are credited as guest stars in the final episode of season 3, "Odd Together Now", for their appearance in archival footage. They do not appear in new footage here.)			Main
Agent Otto	Filip Geljo	Main	Main		Guest			Main
Ms. O / Big O	Millie Davis	Main (Note: Davis is credited as a main cast member until the twenty-first episode of season 3, "Odd Off the Press", where she departed the series.)	Main	Main	Main			Main
Agent Oscar	Sean Michael Kyer	Main (Note: Kyer is credited as a main cast member until the sixth episode of season 2, "Oscar Strikes Back", where he departed the series.)	Main		Guest			Main
Agent Olympia	Anna Cathcart		Main		Guest			Main
Agent Otis	Isaac Kragten		Main		Guest			Main
Agent Oona	Olivia Presti		Main (Note: Presti is credited as a main cast member as of the seventh episode of season 2, "Olympia's Day/Otis' Day". Prior to this, she is credited as a guest star.)	Guest	Guest			Main
Agent Opal	Valentina Herrera			Main	Guest			
Agent Omar	Jayce Alexander			Main	Main			
Agent Oswald	Gavin MacIver-Wright			Main	Main			
Agent Orla	Alyssa Hidalgo			Main	Main			
Agent Osmeralda	Glee Dango			Recurring	Main			
Orpita / Little O	Shazdeh Kapadia			Guest	Main			
Agent Ozzie	Alexander Shaw					Main	Main	
Agent Orli	Asha Soetan					Main	Main	
Captain O	Shelly Lagodinsky					Main	Main	
Agent Onom	Samir Simon-Keegan					Main	Main	

=== Main ===
Cast of season 1 and 2 from left to right: Sean Michael Kyer as Oscar, Dalila Bela as Olive, Filip Geljo as Otto, Millie Davis as Ms. O, Olivia Presti as Oona, Isaac Kragten as Otis, Anna Cathcart as Olympia.

- Agent Olive (Isabela Moner, pilot; Dalila Bela, season 1): Referred to as a longtime employee of the Odd Squad, Olive began season one of the series adapting to working with and training her new partner, Otto. Olive is usually calm, brisk and serious. She has a morbid fear of pies, which she acquired after saving her organization's building from a pie-related disaster caused by her former partner, Todd. In the season one finale, Olive departs the series along with her partner, Otto, to run a different Odd Squad precinct as Ms. O.
- Agent Otto (Jaden Michael, pilot; Filip Geljo, season 1): Olive's partner and, in the first episode, the newest employee of the organization. In contrast to his partner's more serious demeanor and personality, he is a more lenient, laid-back employee. Despite his lack of experience with his job, Otto frequently uncovers the facts needed to solve the case at hand, even doing so in the absence of his more experienced partner. In the season finale, Otto departs the series to run another Odd Squad precinct as Mr. O with Olive as his partner.
- Big O (Millie Davis, seasons 1–3): Known as "Ms. O" (the title of any female head of an Odd Squad division) in the first two seasons, she is a very strict boss. She tends to yell (a habit seen less frequently as the series progresses) and is often seen sipping a juice box. Despite appearing younger than most of the agents, Ms. O's tenure at the precinct and her actual age remain a mystery. In-show, it is revealed that her actual name is "Oprah." In the season two finale, Ms. O is promoted to the rank of Big O, the leader of the entire Odd Squad organization. She leaves the show after the Season 3 episode "Odd Off the Press" due to traveling to outer space, appointing Orpita, an agent-in-training, as the Little O to replace her.
- Agent Oscar (Sean Michael Kyer, seasons 1–2): Oscar was the precinct's head scientist in charge of the laboratory. Other employees go to him for technical solutions to their problems. Oscar is depicted as being very intelligent and having a quirky and goofy personality. He leaves the show after the Season 2 episode "Oscar Strikes Back," where he becomes the president of the organization's science division after the former president is dismissed for misconduct. He appoints Agent Oona to take over for him.
- Agent Olympia (Anna Cathcart, season 2): Introduced in the first episode of season two, Olympia joins the series to fill in the opening left by the departure of Olive in the season one finale. She was given early graduation from the organization's training academy. She is depicted as being very sociable and outgoing and having a generally happy and carefree personality.
- Agent Otis (Isaac Kragten, season 2): Like Olympia, Otis was introduced at the start of season two, brought in to fill the opening left by the departure of Otto in the season one finale. Unlike his partner, he has a more serious and socially reserved personality. There are no records of him attending the organization's academy, but he is depicted as being the more seasoned member of the new team. He has a fear of ducks, revealed in the season two finale to be related to the fact he was once part of a family of villainous ducks. Ms. O took pity on Otis and trained him herself to become an Odd Squad agent.
- Agent Oona (Olivia Presti, season 2; special guest season 3): Initially Oscar's assistant, she takes up his position after his departure. Like Oscar, she is depicted as having a quirky personality.
- Agent Opal (Valentina Herrera, season 3): Originally stationed at a precinct in the Arctic with Omar, she is competitive with a strong desire to be working on cases important to combating oddness, viewing herself as the leader of OSMU. Opal's sister, Olizabeth, is The Shadow. She departed the series after the Season 3 episode "End of the Road" because she is staying with Olizabeth to fix the damage done in Australia.
- Agent Omar (Jayce Alexander, season 3): Originally stationed in the Arctic with Opal, he is known to value friendship and connection with his fellow agents, often attempting to mediate or calm the waters among his team, although his tendency to do so can sometimes distract him from the mission at hand.
- Agent Oswald (Gavin MacIver-Wright, season 3): Before being assigned to the Odd Squad Mobile Unit, Oswald worked as the only employee of the Odd Squad museum in New York City. Having spent his entire career behind a desk, he is often excited to jump into tasks or cases.
- Agent Orla (Alyssa Hidalgo, season 3): Orla joins the Odd Squad Mobile Unit after being isolated for 400 years at an ancient Odd Squad headquarters protecting the powerful 44-leaf clover. Because of her separation from society at large and her history standing guard, she is often unfamiliar with modern inventions and has a tendency to react to situations quickly and without forethought.
- Agent Osmeralda (Glee Dango, season 3): Appearing as Esmeralda Kim in early season 3, she often showed up desiring to help but stating she was too busy with various hobbies such as karate or music instrument practice. In "Odd Off the Press," having finally cleared up her schedule, she is brought in to fill the opening left by the departure of Opal. She brings her out-of-the-box thinking skills to the team.
- Little O (Shazdeh Kapadia, season 3): Formerly Big O's assistant, she takes a position as a substitute for Big O as the head of Odd Squad at the end of "Odd Off the Press."
- Agent Ozzie (Alexander Shaw, season 4): An agent at an Odd Squad precinct in the United Kingdom.
- Agent Orli (Asha Soetan, season 4): An agent who lives and works in Niagara Falls and is called to the United Kingdom Odd Squad precinct to assist in stemming the rising oddness rates.
- Captain O (Shelly Lagodinsky, season 4): The head of an Odd Squad precinct in the United Kingdom.
- Agent Onom (Samir Simon-Keegan, season 4): A scientist at an Odd Squad precinct in the United Kingdom.
- Agent Orwell (Alexander Joseph, season 4) A security agent at an Odd Squad precinct in the United Kingdom.
- Agent Osgood (Zach Bent, season 4) The cook of an Odd Squad precinct in the United Kingdom.
- Agent Opie (Halle Brady, season 4) The new agent of the Department of Help after Ozzie becomes an agent.
- Agent Omni (Mimi Soetan, season 5)
- Agent Osric (Dalton Jones, season 5)

=== Recurring ===
==== Odd Squad employees ====
- Dr. O (Peyton Kennedy, seasons 1–2; Kaden Stephen, season 2): The precinct's resident medical employee who assists others with medical-related problems. She's known for her eccentric behavior and frequently says nonsensical stuff; often her dialogue references popular science fiction series like Star Trek or Doctor Who. It is revealed in-show that she was once a worker in the Odd Squad gift shop, but became a doctor when the gift shop was shut down. After the original Dr. O leaves to work as a doctor in space, she is replaced with a new male doctor who previously worked in another department.
- Agent Obfusco (Jaeden J. Noel, season 1): An Odd Squad agent and cross-cultural expert who speaks in obscure riddles, a characteristic intended to teach viewers how to understand word problems. He is eccentric and difficult for the other agents to understand, which leads them to try to avoid working with him.
- Agent Ocean (Elijah Sandiford, season 2): The precinct's director of the 'Creature Room,' which houses many bizarre creatures and plants which Odd Squad agents may need to know about. Ocean has a laid-back and easy-going personality.
- Agent Octavia (Julia Lalonde, season 1): Agent Oz's partner. It was noted in an episode that she is one of the precinct's best employees. She is usually looking for her partner because he is invisible.
- Agent O'Donahue (Tate Yap, season 1–2): Ms. O's partner after Olga went to the odd side. He was Ms. O's partner up until the 1980s when he and Oprah (Ms. O) failed to solve a case featuring a mysterious villain Equal Evan. He then quit, but returned 30 years later to help his partner finally solve the case. Now he pretends to be retired while secretly solving cases undercover for Ms. O.
- Oksana (Madeleine Barbeau, seasons 1–2): The precinct's sole resident cook. She has a deadpan and sarcastic personality.
- Agent Olaf (Eshaan Buadwal, seasons 1–2): Agent Oren's partner. Olaf is happy-go-lucky but tends to be simple-minded. Despite this, he has displayed moments of intelligence, often to the shock and amazement of his fellow agents. He shares Oren's penchant for laziness. He dreams of becoming a dentist. He has an unusual potato obsession. Later on in the series, it is revealed that he is a werewolf.
- Agent Orchid (Michela Luci, seasons 1–3): One of the younger agents. She tends to be extremely stubborn and is often sarcastic and difficult as well as cunning and manipulative. She enjoys calling others "Sherman."
- Agent Oren (Brendan Heard, seasons 1–2): Agent Olaf's partner. Oren is depicted as snarky and arrogant. Oren and his partner have an ongoing rivalry with Olive and Otto. Oren has an unusual fear of pancakes and dreams of becoming an Odd Squad director and running his own precinct.
- Other Olympia (Saara Chaudry, seasons 1–2): Ms. O's old assistant. After defeating a villain, she became an agent alongside her partner Ozric. Her name used to be Olympia until she and Agent Olympia (Anna Cathcart) had a "name off" in the episode Other Olympia. Her name was later changed to Odal.
- Agent Owen (Christian Distefano, seasons 1–2): The head of the precinct's Security department, in charge of defending against intruders and other vital protective measures of the surrounding town, the squad and its employees. He is frequently seen going on break.
- Agent Orson (Nashton Avila, Nathan Avila, seasons 1–3): One of the baby agents, he is an excellent driver and was frequent winner of the precinct's employee of the month award until he was found to have rigged the results. In the season two finale, Agent Orson is promoted to Mr. O after the former Ms. O is promoted to the rank of Big O.
- Agent Ozlyn (Arista Arhin, season 2): Worker in the Security Department.
- Agent Olly (Sasha Steiner, season 2): A former doctor who now assists Oksana with maintaining the building's break room and cafeteria.
- Agent Xavier (Leonidas Castrounis, season 2): An agent from Odd Squad's Department X Special Task Force who oversee the agency's work, enforce rules (similar to Internal Affairs) and have the power to temporarily shut Odd Squad down.
- Agent Xena (Sheena Darnley, season 2): Agent Xavier's partner.

==== Others ====
- Delivery Debbie (Ashley Botting): A pizzeria owner who has appeared in numerous episodes and played a key part in the series movie, Odd Squad: The Movie (2016). Her archrival is Delivery Doug (Ali Hassan) who specializes in the sale of egg-salad sandwiches.
- Delivery Doug (Ali Hassan): Delivery Debbie's ex-rival, owner of Delivery Doug's Egg Salad Sandwiches, and co-founder of Doug and Debbie's Egg-Salad Pizzeria. On the contrary to Debbie's restaurant, Doug used to run his business in his mother's basement and uses his Eggmobile to get around. He now lives and operates his business in the Arctic, where he has two locations.
- Polly Graph (Ava Preston): A girl who runs a stand selling hot chocolate or lemonade, depending on the season, outside her house. Employees of the local 'Odd Squad' precinct frequently patronize her stand. She is very fond of graphs and has just the right visual representation to deal with the situation at hand. While she is not an agent, she offers data to employees who visit her stand. On occasion, she assists with cases and internal business within the organization.
- Soundcheck (Lucas Meeuse, Matthew Armet, Thomas Alderson, Stephan Dickson): A satirical boy band made up of Tony D., Danny T., Ringo, and Johnny J., and is well liked by most of the precinct employees. Songs by the group include Take Away Four, The Force of Gravity and Up, Down, Left, Right. Sound Check as a group appears on the album Odd Squad: Stop the Music.
- Rivka (Meghan Allen): The caretaker for the unseen Baby Genius, a mysterious infant who the Odd Squad agents bargain with for solutions to otherwise unsolvable problems. Agents meet with them in a dark alley, and have to give gifts that amuse Baby Genius, to get their help.
- The Baker (Aisha Alfa): - A recurring character in many Odd Squad episodes, the Baker runs a bakery in town and frequently requests the help of the Odd Squad in solving problems around her shop.
- Mayor Macklemore (Seán Cullen): - Mayor of the city where precinct 13579 is located.

==== Antagonists ====
- Agent Ohlm (Jaiden Cannatelli, seasons 1–2): A slow-witted agent who briefly served as a partner for Agent Otto, he later partners with Agent Orchid when Otto and Olive depart the precinct. Ohlm is best known for his unpredictability, causing confusion and getting lost. In the season two finale, it's revealed that Ohlm is in reality a clever, intelligent, calculating individual, but pretended to be dumb in order to destroy Odd Squad out of spite for not immediately being the Big O.
- Fladam (Martin Roach, seasons 1–2): A villain with glasses capable of transforming anything into a two-dimensional form.
- Noisemaker (David Tompa, seasons 1–3): A villain who wants to fill the world with odd noises. He wears a variety of musical instrument all over his body that make sounds whenever he moves.
- Odd Todd (Joshua Kilimnik, seasons 1–2): Previously Olive's partner, Todd was fired for misconduct and began to pursue villainy, taking the name of 'Odd Todd'. A recurring villain in the first season, he was outsmarted by Agent Otto and renounced villainy for other interests. In the second season, he takes up gardening and has been seen providing assistance to the precinct's employees; he briefly returns as a villain in an alternate timeline in "World Turned Odd." In the season two finale, he is running a center to help other villains reform. Early in the first season before Todd was introduced, a running gag was that the number 43, his badge number, was hidden in various places for viewers to find.
- President Obbs (Jaedon Siewert, season 2): The former president of the Odd Squad Scientists. After an attempt to mind control all scientists and take over the world, he was fired. Agent Oscar then took over his role as the president of the Odd Squad Scientists.
- Shapeshifter (Laura Landauer, seasons 1–2): A villain who can transform anything or anyone, including herself, into a different object or person. A younger version of Shapeshifter is seen in the movie produced to accompany the series. In Season 3, she has a twin sister named The Form Changer.
- Tiny Dancer (Danielle Benton, seasons 1–2): A villain that makes inanimate objects dance on command.
- Freeze Ray Ray (Farid Yazdani, Season 2): A villain who can freeze anything or anyone, including himself, using his left hand encased in his case.
- Jamie Jam (Ashley Comeau, seasons 2–3): A villain who likes to jam up the city. She likes to stress the difference between jams and jellies.
- Kooky Clown (seasons 1–2): A villain who wants to destroy Odd Squad so that the world would be more kooky.
- Jelly Bean Joe (Dustin Redshaw, season 1) a villain who covers the city in things like feathers or pudding if you don't guess how many jellybeans are in his jar
- The Shadow (Zarina Richard, season 3): A villain who causes oddness for the Odd Squad Mobile Unit. Her real name is revealed to be Olizabeth in "Follow the Leader." She is Agent Opal's sister.
- Brutus (Osias Reid, season 3): The Shadow's assistant.
- The Square Squire (Liam Gerrard, season 4): A villain who only like things that are square.

== Episode list ==
Season	Episodes	Originally released	
Season	Episodes	First released	Last released
1	40	November 26, 2014	May 30, 2016
2	35	June 20, 2016	January 21, 2019
Specials		August 1, 2016	January 15, 2018
3	33	February 17, 2020	July 8, 2022
4	12	October 1, 2024	October 24, 2024
5	12	April 6, 2026	October 28, 2026
6	12	April 2027	TBD

== Production ==
Odd Squad is produced by Sinking Ship Entertainment, and its first seasons were primarily filmed in a studio in Toronto, Ontario, Canada. Part of season 3 was filmed in Cambridge, Ontario.

The final episode of season 3 aired on July 8, 2022. A fourth season, dubbed Odd Squad UK, was released on October 1, 2024. The fourth season was filmed in the United Kingdom and was produced in association with BBC Studios Kids & Family. A further season set in the United Kingdom was ordered in 2025.

Odd Squad episodes aired on PBS Kids in the United States and CBC Kids in Canada. In the UK, the series aired on CBBC and BBC Two. In Australia, it aired on ABC Kids and ABC Me.

== Reception ==
=== Critical response ===
Odd Squad has received positive reviews from television critics and parents of young children. Monica of Mommy Maestra Blog wrote, "Funny, clever, and sooo creative!" Andrews P Street of The Guardian called Odd Squad "smart and silly to the perfect degree" and praised its cast and "non-sequitur comedy."

=== Awards and nominations ===
Year	Award	Category	Recipients	Result
2015	Banff World Media Festival	Best Show – Pre-School Category	Sinking Ship Entertainment	Won
2015	Daytime Emmy Awards	Outstanding Children's Series	Sinking Ship Entertainment	Nominated
2015	Daytime Emmy Awards	Outstanding Writing in a Children's Series	Tim McKeon, Alexandra Fox, Rachel Lewis, Adam Peltzman and Mark DeAngelis	Nominated
2015	Daytime Emmy Awards	Outstanding Single Camera Editing	Jennifer Essex-Chew, Courtney Goldman and Sinking Ship Entertainment	Nominated
2015	Daytime Emmy Awards	Outstanding Sound Editing – Live Action	P. Jason MacNeil, James Robinson, Earl Torno, Bill Turchinetz, John D. Smith, Dave Yonson, Virginia Storey and Sinking Ship Entertainment	Nominated
2015	Daytime Emmy Awards	Outstanding Directing in a Children's Series	J. J. Johnson	Won
2015	Daytime Emmy Awards	Outstanding Hairstyling	Patricia Cuthbert	Won
2015	Kidscreen Awards	Kids: Best Non-Animated or Mixed Series	Sinking Ship Entertainment	Nominated
2015	Parents' Choice Award	Parents' Choice Gold Honor	Sinking Ship Entertainment	Won
2015	Youth Media Alliance	Award of Excellence, Best Convergent Website	Sinking Ship Entertainment	Nominated
2015	Youth Media Alliance	Award of Excellence for Best Television Program, All Genres, Ages 6–8 Category	Sinking Ship Entertainment	Won
2016	TCA Awards	Outstanding Achievement in Youth Programming	Odd Squad	Nominated
2016	Canadian Screen Awards	Best Direction in a Children's or Youth Program or Series	Craig Wallace and Sinking Ship Entertainment	Nominated
2016	Canadian Screen Awards	Best Writing in a Children's or Youth Program or Series	Tim McKeon and Sinking Ship Entertainment	Nominated
2016	Canadian Screen Awards	Best Picture Editing in a Variety or Sketch Comedy Program or Series	Sinking Ship Entertainment	Nominated
2016	Canadian Screen Awards	Best Performance in a Children's or Youth Series	Dalila Bela	Nominated
2016	Canadian Screen Awards	Best Pre-School Program or Series	Sinking Ship Entertainment	Won
2016	Daytime Emmy Awards	Outstanding Children's Series	Paul Siefken, J.J. Johnson, Tim McKeon, Blair Powers, Adam Peltzman, Emily Helfgot, Matthew J.R. Bishop, Mark De Angelis, Georgina Lopez and Sinking Ship Entertainment	Nominated
2016	Daytime Emmy Awards	Interactive Media – Enhancement to Daytime Series	Blair Powers, Paul Siefken, Gavin Friesen, Ronald Ruslim, Dave Peth and Sinking Ship Entertainment	Nominated
2016	Daytime Emmy Awards	Outstanding Stunt Coordination	Regan Moore	Nominated
2016	Daytime Emmy Awards	Outstanding Performer in a Children's Series or Pre-School Series - Oscar	Sean Michael Kyer	Nominated
2016	Daytime Emmy Awards	Outstanding Sound Editing – Live Action	John Douglas Smith, P. Jason MacNeil, Bill Turchinetz, Dave Yonson and Virginia Storey	Nominated
2016	Daytime Emmy Awards	Outstanding Writing in a Children's Series	Tim McKeon, Charles Johnston and Mark De Angelis	Won
2016	Daytime Emmy Awards	Outstanding Directing in a Children's Series	J.J. Johnson, Stephen Reynolds, Brian K. Roberts, Stefan Scaini, Craig David Wallace and Sinking Ship Entertainment	Won
2016	Daytime Emmy Awards	Outstanding Costume Design	Christine Toye	Won
2016	Daytime Emmy Awards	Outstanding Hairstyling	Patricia Cuthbert	Won
2016	Parents' Choice Award	Parents' Choice Gold Honor	Sinking Ship Entertainment	Won
2017	TCA Awards	Outstanding Achievement in Youth Programming	Odd Squad	Nominated
2017	Canadian Screen Awards	Best Performance by an Actress in a Leading Role in a Dramatic Program or Limited Series	Millie Davis	Nominated
2017	Canadian Screen Awards	Best Direction in a Children's or Youth Program or Series	J.J. Johnson	Nominated
2017	Canadian Screen Awards	Best Direction in a Children's or Youth Program or Series	Stefan Scaini	Nominated
2017	Canadian Screen Awards	Best Original Music Score for a Program	Paul Buckley	Nominated
2017	Canadian Screen Awards	Best Performance in a Children's or Youth Program	Sean Michael Kyer	Nominated
2017	Canadian Screen Awards	Best TV Movie or Limited Series	Odd Squad: The Movie – Sinking Ship Entertainment	Nominated
2017	Canadian Screen Awards	Best Writing in a Children's or Youth Series	Tim McKeon, Adam Peltzman and Mark DeAngelis	Nominated
2017	Canadian Screen Awards	Best Children's or Youth Fiction Program or Series	Sinking Ship Entertainment	Won
2017	Daytime Emmy Awards	Outstanding Children's or Family Viewing Series	J.J. Johnson, Tim McKeon, Blair Powers, Paul Siefken, Matthew J.R. Bishop, Georgina Lopez and Stephen J. Turnbull	Nominated
2017	Daytime Emmy Awards	Outstanding Interactive – Enhancement to Daytime Program or Series	Ellen Doherty, Tim McKeon, Adam Peltzman, Blair Powers, Gavin Friesen, Ronald Ruslim, Stephen J. Turnbull, Dave Peth and Anna Cathcart	Nominated
2017	Daytime Emmy Awards	Outstanding Writing for a Children's, Preschool Children's, Family Viewing Program	Tim McKeon, Amy Benham, Charles Johnston, Adam Peltzman, Mark De Angelis and Robby Hoffman	Nominated
2017	Daytime Emmy Awards	Outstanding Directing in a Children's Series	J.J. Johnson, Stephen Reynolds, Stefan Scaini and Warren P. Sonoda	Nominated
2017	Daytime Emmy Awards	Outstanding Single Camera Editing	Jennifer Essex-Chew, Courtney Goldman and Christopher Minns	Nominated
2017	Daytime Emmy Awards	Outstanding Performer in a Children's, Pre-School Children's or Family Viewing Program	Isaac Kragten	Won
2017	Daytime Emmy Awards	Outstanding Costume Design	Christine Toye	Won
2017	Daytime Emmy Awards	Outstanding Hairstyling	Liz Roelands	Won
2017	Daytime Emmy Awards	Outstanding Make-up	Jenna Servatius	Won
2017	Parents' Choice Award	Parents' Choice Gold Honor	Sinking Ship Entertainment	Won
2017	Youth Media Alliance	Best Program, Live Action, Ages 6–9	Sinking Ship Entertainment	Nominated
2017	Kidscreen Awards	Best Non-Animated or Mixed Series - KIDS PROGRAMING	Sinking Ship Entertainment	Won
2018	TCA Awards	Outstanding Achievement in Youth Programming	Odd Squad	Nominated
2018	Canadian Screen Awards	Best Children's or Youth Fiction Program or Series	Sinking Ship Entertainment	Won
2018	Canadian Screen Awards	Best Direction, Children's or Youth	J.J. Johnson	Nominated
2018	Canadian Screen Awards	Best Writing, Children's or Youth	Tim McKeon and Adam Peltzman	Won
2018	Canadian Screen Awards	Best Performance, Children's or Youth	Anna Cathcart	Nominated
2018	Canadian Screen Awards	Best Cross-Platform Project	Odd Squad 1.5	Won
2018	US International Film Festival	Second Place – Silver Screen Award	Sinking Ship Entertainment	Won
2018	Daytime Emmy Awards	Outstanding Children's or Family Viewing Series	J.J. Johnson, Tim McKeon, Blair Powers, Paul Siefken, Ellen Doherty, Matthew J.R. Bishop, Adam Peltzman, Mark De Angelis, Stephen J. Turnbull and Sinking Ship Entertainment	Nominated
2018	Daytime Emmy Awards	Outstanding Writing for a Children's, Preschool Children's, Family Viewing Program	Tim McKeon, Adam Peltzman, Mark De Angelis and Robby Hoffman	Nominated
2018	Daytime Emmy Awards	Outstanding Directing in a Children's Series	J.J. Johnson, Stephen Reynolds and Warren P. Sonoda	Nominated
2018	Daytime Emmy Awards	Outstanding Art Direction/Set Decoration/Scenic Design	Ron Stefaniuk, Diana Magnus, Amanda Vernuccio, Danielle Dobbyn, Jennifer Bryson and Sinking Ship Entertainment	Nominated
2018	Daytime Emmy Awards	Outstanding Lighting Direction	George Lajtai, C.S.C and Sinking Ship Entertainment	Nominated
2018	Daytime Emmy Awards	Outstanding Sound Mixing	Igor Bezuglov, Andrew McDonnell, John Bradshaw, Sean Karp and Sinking Ship Entertainment	Nominated
2018	Daytime Emmy Awards	Outstanding Costume Design/Styling	Christine Toye	Nominated
2018	Daytime Emmy Awards	Outstanding Hairstyling	Liz Roelands	Nominated
2019	TCA Awards	Outstanding Achievement in Youth Programming	Odd Squad	Nominated
2019	Daytime Emmy Awards	Outstanding Children's or Family Viewing Series	Ellen Doherty, J.J. Johnson, Tim McKeon, Blair Powers, Matthew J.R. Bishop, Mark De Angelis, Adam Peltzman and Stephen J. Turnbull	Won
2019	Daytime Emmy Awards	Outstanding Writing for a Children's, Preschool Children's, Family Viewing Program	Tim McKeon, Mark De Angelis, Adam Peltzman and Robby Hoffman	Won
2019	Daytime Emmy Awards	Outstanding Directing for a Children's, Preschool Children's or Family Viewing Program	J. J. Johnson, Melanie Orr and Stefan Scaini	Nominated
2019	Daytime Emmy Awards	Outstanding Art Direction/Set Decoration/Scenic Design	Ron Stefaniuk, Amanda Vernuccio and Danielle Dobbyn	Nominated
2019	Daytime Emmy Awards	Outstanding Costume Design/Styling	Christine Toye	Nominated
2019	Daytime Emmy Awards	Outstanding Writing for a Children's, Preschool Children's, Family Viewing Program	Tim McKeon, Mark De Angelis, Adam Peltzman and Robby Hoffman (for "World Turned Odd")	Nominated
2019	Daytime Emmy Awards	Outstanding Directing for a Children's, Preschool Children's or Family Viewing Program	J. J. Johnson (for "World Turned Odd")	Won
2019	Youth Media Alliance	Best Program, Live Action, Ages 6–9	Sinking Ship Entertainment	Won
2019	Youth Media Alliance	Best Interactive Content, Ages 6–9	Odd Squad 2.0	Nominated
2019	Youth Media Alliance	Outstanding Youth Performer	Anna Cathcart	Nominated
2019	Youth Media Alliance	Outstanding Youth Performer	Millie Davis	Nominated
2019	Youth Media Alliance	Outstanding Youth Performer	Isaac Kragten	Nominated
2019	Canadian Screen Awards	Best Children's or Youth Fiction Program or Series	J.J. Johnson, Tim McKeon, Blair Powers, Paul Siefken, Matthew R.J. Bishop, Adam Peltzman, Mark De Angelis and Stephen J. Turnbull	Won
2019	Canadian Screen Awards	Best Direction, Children's or Youth	J.J. Johnson	Won
2019	Canadian Screen Awards	Best Performance, Children's or Youth	Anna Cathcart	Won
2019	Canadian Screen Awards	Best Performance, Children's or Youth	Millie Davis	Nominated
2019	Canadian Screen Awards	Best Performance, Children's or Youth	Isaac Kragten	Nominated
2019	Canadian Screen Awards	Best Writing, Children's or Youth	Mark De Angelis and Leah Gotcsik (for "Where There's a Wolf, There's a Way" and "New Jacket Required")	Won
2019	Parent's Choice	Gold Honour 2019 Parent's Choice Award		Won
2019	Kidscreen Awards	Best Non-Animated or Mixed Series		Won
2019	Kidscreen Awards	Best in Class		Won
2019	Kidscreen Awards	Best Non-Animated or Mixed Series		Nominated
2019	Kidscreen Awards	Best Website		Won
2019	British Academy Children's Awards	International Live-Action	Scott Montgomery, Warren P. Sonoda, Mark D'Angelis	Nominated
2020	TCA Awards	Outstanding Achievement in Youth Programming	Odd Squad	Nominated
2020	Daytime Emmy Awards	Outstanding Sound Editing for a Live Action Program	James Robinson, Bill Turchinetz, John Douglas Smith, Jason MacNeill, Ryan Lukasik, Jason Charbonneau and Brandon Bak	Won
2021	TCA Awards	Outstanding Achievement in Youth Programming	Odd Squad	Nominated
2021	Daytime Emmy Awards	Outstanding Art Direction/Set Decoration/Scenic Design	Amanda Vernuccio, Sean Moore, Stephen Depko and Darren Pickering	Won
2021	Daytime Emmy Awards	Outstanding Lighting Direction	Gayle Ye	Won
2022	TCA Awards	Outstanding Achievement in Youth Programming	Odd Squad	Nominated

== Other media ==
There have been two movie adaptations of the series. The first, Odd Squad: The Movie, premiered with a one-day theatrical showing in Canada before premiering on PBS Kids on August 1, 2016. A second film, Odd Squad: World Turned Odd, was released on PBS Kids in 2018.

A vlog-style web series spinoff named OddTube premiered on the PBS Kids website on November 10, 2016. The series was hosted by Agent Olympia and featured cameos from the season 2 cast. It ran for 20 episodes. A second season hosted by Agent Orla ran for twelve episodes on June 10, 2020.

Several Odd Squad themed video games have been created for the PBS Kids website and TVO Kids. An official series tie-in book titled: 'The Odd Squad Agent's Handbook' was released in 2020. It was written by the show's creators, Tim McKeon and Adam Peltzman.

== Merchandise ==
In the United States, Sinking Ship Entertainment signed a deal with St. Louis-based company Really Big Coloring Books to manufacture and distribute Odd Squad books with the publisher launching coloring books at Walmart, Amazon and PBS affiliate e-commerce sites.
