= Odd Squad: The Movie =

2016 Canadian film

- Theatrical release poster
- Directed by: J. J. Johnson
- Written by: Tim McKeon; Mark DeAngelis; Adam Peltzman
- Based on: Odd Squad
- Produced by: J. J. Johnson; Tim McKeon; Blair Powers; Paul Siefken
- Starring: Dalila Bela; Anna Cathcart; Millie Davis; Filip Geljo; Isaac Kragten; Sean Michael Kyer; Olivia Presti; Hannah Simone; Jack McBrayer
- Cinematography: George Lajtai
- Edited by: Jennifer Essex-Chew
- Music by: Paul Buckley
- Production companies: Fred Rogers Productions; Sinking Ship Entertainment
- Distributed by: TVOKids (Canada); PBS Kids (United States)
- Release dates: July 16, 2016 (theatrical); August 1, 2016 (television)
- Running time: 67 minutes
- Country: Canada
- Language: English

Odd Squad: The Movie is a 2016 Canadian science fiction comedy film produced and directed by J. J. Johnson and written by Tim McKeon, Mark DeAngelis and Adam Peltzman. Based on the TVOKids and PBS Kids television series Odd Squad, the film stars Dalila Bela, Anna Cathcart, Millie Davis, Filip Geljo, Isaac Kragten, Sean Michael Kyer, Olivia Presti, Hannah Simone and Jack McBrayer. The film takes place during season 2 of the series and follows the Odd Squad organization as they are forced out of business by an adult-led organization called the Weird Team, and Odd Squad's attempts to stop the infestation of creatures known as "Daves."

Odd Squad: The Movie received a limited theatrical release by TVOKids in Canada on July 16, 2016, followed by its television premiere on PBS Kids on August 1. The film earned six nominations at the 44th Daytime Creative Arts Emmy Awards, winning for Outstanding Special Class Writing. The film also earned three nominations at the Canadian Screen Awards, winning for Best Children's or Youth Fiction Program or Series.

== Plot ==
Olympia and Otis are partners at Odd Squad, an organization run by kids that uses math and gadgets to correct peculiar problems. After stopping a giant mouse from ruining the mayor's cheese festival, they visit Delivery Debbie to fix her feet, which have turned into snails. While they are working on a solution, they are interrupted by a new rival, Weird Tom, who boasts that he is a doer instead of a thinker and "fixes" Debbie's feet using a hologram gadget. Weird Tom and his organization, Weird Team, which is staffed by adults, win over the town by solving problems faster than Odd Squad and giving everyone free t-shirts, putting Odd Squad out of business and purchasing their headquarters.

Olympia and Otis discover that Weird Tom did not fix Debbie's feet and realize that he is hiding problems instead of solving them. They reunite with Ms. O and Oona and confirm their findings by reading a bar chart from an Oddometer. The agents confront Weird Tom, who reveals that he was kicked out of Odd Squad for being too impulsive and put the organization out of business to get revenge. The agents try to tell the public the truth about Weird Tom, but he creates a video framing them for causing Debbie's oddness. While watching the video, Oona notices that Weird Tom has not been managing the population size of the "Daves", creatures who multiply to form double their original number, and that they are close to escaping headquarters and destroying the Earth.

The agents break into headquarters with help from previous agents, Olive, Otto, and Oscar. Otis and Otto dance through lasers to turn off the security cameras and the others distract the adults with coffee and biscotti to get the Half-inator. However, Weird Tom stops the group before they are able to prevent the Daves from escaping.

Ms. O devises a plan to zap all of the Daves on Earth at once from space using a converted ice cream truck. Weird Tom agrees to help by reinstating former Odd Squad agents across the world. Otis, Olympia, Olive, and Otto travel to space in the ice cream truck. They are attacked by Daves en route but shake them off by playing music from the truck's speakers. They zap all of the Daves by reflecting the beam from the Half-inator off of agents in reflective suits and Oscar and Oona capture the final Dave. The agents fly off into outer space to celebrate. In a series of mid-credits scenes, Oscar shows Oona secret features of the headquarters science lab, finishing with a button that ends the movie.

== Cast ==
- Millie Davis as Ms. O, the head of Precinct 13579 of Odd Squad
- Olivia Presti as Oona, the head of the science department of Precinct 13579 and Oscar's former assistant
- Isaac Kragten as Otis, an agent for Precinct 13579 and Olympia's partner
- Anna Cathcart as Olympia, an agent for Precinct 13579 and Otis' partner
- Peyton Kennedy as Dr. O, the resident doctor of Precinct 13579
- Jack McBrayer as Weird Tom, the head of Weird Team
- Hannah Simone as Weird Emily, a member of Weird Team and Tom's assistant
- Filip Geljo as Otto, a former agent for Precinct 13579 and Olive's former partner. Geljo was a main cast member on season 1 of Odd Squad
- Dalila Bela as Olive, a former agent for Precinct 13579 and Otto's former partner. Bela was a main cast member on season 1 of Odd Squad
- Sean Michael Kyer as Oscar, the president of Odd Squad's science division and former head of the science department for Precinct 13579

== Production ==
Odd Squad: The Movie was directed by J. J. Johnson, who served as an executive producer for the Odd Squad television series.

== Release ==
Odd Squad: The Movie was released theatrically in 90 theaters across Canada on July 16, 2016, as part of a partnership between TVO, Sinking Ship Entertainment and theater chain Cineplex Entertainment.

== Reception ==
=== Critical response ===
Emily Ashby of Common Sense Media gave the film a positive review, calling it a "must-see for fans of the show."

=== Accolades ===
Year	Award	Category	Nominated work	Result
2017	Daytime Emmy Awards	Outstanding Sound Mixing – Live Action	Odd Squad: The Movie	Nominated
2017	Daytime Emmy Awards	Outstanding Sound Editing – Live Action	Odd Squad: The Movie	Nominated
2017	Daytime Emmy Awards	Outstanding Special Class Writing	Tim McKeon, Mark DeAngelis and Adam Peltzman	Won
2017	Daytime Emmy Awards	Outstanding Performer in a Children's, Pre-School Children's or Family Viewing Program	Jack McBrayer	Nominated
2017	Daytime Emmy Awards	Outstanding Special Class Directing	J. J. Johnson	Nominated
2017	Daytime Emmy Awards	Outstanding Main Title and Graphic Design	Odd Squad: The Movie	Nominated
2017	Writers Guild of Canada Awards	MOW & Miniseries	Tim McKeon and Adam Peltzman	Nominated
2017	Young Artist Awards	Best Performance in a Feature Film – Leading Young Actress	Olivia Presti	Nominated
2017	Directors Guild of Canada Awards	Outstanding Directorial Achievement in Movies for Television and Mini-Series	J. J. Johnson	Nominated
2017	Canadian Screen Awards	Best Children's or Youth Fiction Program or Series	Odd Squad: The Movie	Won
2017	Canadian Screen Awards	Best Actress in a Leading Role in a Dramatic Program or Limited Series	Millie Davis	Nominated
2017	Canadian Screen Awards	Best TV Movie	Odd Squad: The Movie	Nominated

== Sequel ==
A standalone sequel titled Odd Squad: World Turned Odd, premiered on PBS Kids on January 15, 2018, with Davis, Kragten, Cathcart and Presti reprising their roles.
