= Filip Geljo =

Canadian-Filipino actor (born 2002)

- Born: April 13, 2002 (age 24); Toronto, Ontario, Canada
- Occupation: Actor
- Years active: 2014–present
- Known for: Avatar: The Way of Water; Odd Squad; The Waiting Room
- Father: Jasmin Geljo

Filip Geljo (born April 13, 2002) is a Canadian actor of Filipino and Bosnian descent, known for portraying Aonung in Avatar: The Way of Water and Agent Otto in the PBS Kids TV series Odd Squad.

== Early life ==
Geljo was born in Toronto, Canada, on April 13, 2002, to a Filipino mother and Bosnian actor Jasmin Geljo.

== Career ==
Geljo’s first acting role was a small part in a 2014 TV movie called The Last Chance. He also portrayed Dan in the 2015 drama The Waiting Room. In that film, he acted alongside his real father, Jasmin, who played Dan’s father.

On the PBS Kids TV series Odd Squad, Geljo portrayed Agent Otto, one of the two main characters, for 41 episodes, from 2014 to 2016. (In the pilot, Otto was played by Jaden Michael.) He reprised his role as Otto in Odd Squad: The Movie.

In 2017, Geljo was cast as Aonung in James Cameron’s Avatar: The Way of Water, which was released in 2022. He reprised that role in Avatar: Fire and Ash, which was released in 2025.

== Filmography ==
=== Film ===
Key
†	Denotes films that have not yet been released

Year	Title	Role	Notes
2014	The Last Chance	Lee	TV movie
2015	The Waiting Room	Dan	
2015	Shahzad	Philip	Short film
2016	Odd Squad: The Movie	Agent Otto	TV movie with limited theatrical release
2022	Avatar: The Way of Water	Aonung	
2025	Avatar: Fire and Ash	Aonung	

=== Television ===
Year(s)	Title	Role	Notes
2014–2016	Odd Squad	Agent Otto	Main role (season 1); 40 episodes
2016	Annedroids	Eric	“Teacher’s Pals”

== Personal life ==
He is the son of actor Jasmin Geljo.
