= Adam Peltzman =

American television writer and producer

- Born: Adam Peltzman
- Education: Wesleyan University
- Occupations: Writer; producer; voice actor
- Years active: 1997–present
- Known for: Odd Squad; Wallykazam; Blue's Clues; The Backyardigans; The Electric Company; Bubble Guppies; Go, Dog. Go!

Adam Peltzman is an American television writer and producer. He was a writer for various shows at Nickelodeon before creating his own Nick Jr. Channel series, Wallykazam!, as well as he created the PBS Kids series Odd Squad, where he was the head writer and executive producer for both series.

Peltzman was also the head writer for the third season of the rebooted Electric Company series, and is the showrunner and executive producer of the Netflix series, Go, Dog. Go!

== Filmography ==
=== Television ===
Year	Title	Role	Note(s)
1997–2004	Blue's Clues	Head writer/scripting and development coordinator/story editor	49 episodes; also the voice of Green Puppy
2003–04	Miffy and Friends	Writer for game segments	8 segments
2004	LazyTown	Writer	2 episodes
2004–13	The Backyardigans	Head writer/writer/lyricist	43 episodes
2004	Maya & Miguel	Writer	3 episodes
2006–09	Wonder Pets!	Writer	6 episodes
2008	Ni Hao, Kai-Lan	Writer	Episode: "Hoho's Big Flight"
2011–13	Winx Club	Writer/lyricist	Scripting for 26 episodes; lyricist for the song "Power to Change the World"
2011	Team Umizoomi	Writer	2 episodes
2011–20	Bubble Guppies	Writer	7 episodes
2012–13	Octonauts	Writer	15 episodes
2012–13	Peter Rabbit	Writer	9 episodes
2014–17	Wallykazam!	Creator/executive producer/head writer	52 episodes; also the voice of Ghost, Mumble Monkey, Blathertash, Slow Snail and Goose
2014–present	Odd Squad	Co-creator	
2019–23	Helpsters	Executive producer	40 episodes
2019–24	Blue's Clues & You!	Original script writer	3 episodes
2021–23	Go, Dog. Go!	Creator/developer/executive producer/writer	Netflix series; 40 episodes; also the voice of Fireworks Phil

=== Film ===
Year	Title	Role	Note
2000	Blue's Big Musical Movie	Voice of Green Puppy	
2012	Freestyle Love Supreme	Teleplay/executive producer	TV movie
2016	Odd Squad: The Movie	Teleplay/co-executive producer	
2018	Odd Squad: World Turn Odd	Associate story editor/co-executive producer	
