= Millie Davis =

Canadian actress (born 2006)

- Born: December 6, 2006 (age 19); Toronto, Ontario, Canada
- Occupation: Actress
- Years active: 2007–present

Millie Davis (born December 6, 2006) is a Canadian actress who played Ms. O / Big O in the TVOKids/PBS Kids series Odd Squad, Riley in the Amazon Prime television show Dino Dana, Summer in Wonder, Brixlee in Good Boys and Gemma Hendrix in Orphan Black. She was nominated for a Canadian Screen Award for Best Performance by an Actress in a Leading Role in a Dramatic Program or Limited Series as Ms. O in Odd Squad: The Movie at the 5th Canadian Screen Awards and has been co-nominated with the Odd Squad cast for four additional awards, including winning the award for "Best Young Ensemble in a TV Series" at the 2015 Joey Awards.

== Early life ==
Born to Megan and Wayne Davis, an interracial couple. Millie and her older brother, Drew (b. 2003), are actors who have both appeared in Orphan Black, among other roles. Her parents run the Characters Theatre Troupe in Thornhill, Ontario.

== Career ==
In June 2007, when she was six months old, Davis began her career in acting when she first appeared in a commercial with her father and she began TV roles beginning in the late 2000s, shortly before she turned four.

Davis was 7 years old during the first season of Odd Squad, and 13 years old at the start of the third season, where she was the only original cast member still on the show. Her character, Big O, was given a new assignment, and appears to have left the show, in the season three episode "Odd Off The Press", partly since Davis now stars in The Parker Andersons/Amelia Parker.

Interviewed in February 2023 when she was 16, she said that it has been a "trial and error process" keeping up with both school and acting work, although she thinks it has been a net benefit. Her advice to aspiring child actors is that "it's less of a hobby than it is a job".

== Filmography ==
=== Film ===
Year	Title	Role	Notes	Ref.
2012	A Dark Truth	Saber Francis		
2013	The Best Man Holiday	Hope		
2016	Odd Squad: The Movie	Ms. O		
2017	Wonder	Summer Dawson		
2019	Good Boys	Brixlee		
2021	Lamya's Poem	Lamya	Voice	
2022	CCF's Solstice Stories	Marisol Cruz	Short	
2023	CCF's Solstice Stories	Marisol Cruz	Game	

=== Television ===
Year	Title	Role	Notes	Ref.
2011	Befriend and Betray	Caitlyn McQuarrie	Television film	
2012	The Magic Hockey Skates	Chloe	Voice; Television film	
2012–2013	The Doozers	Daisy Wheel	Voice	
2013–2017	Orphan Black	Gemma Hendrix	16 episodes	
2014–2017	Annedroids	PAL	Voice	
2014–2022	Odd Squad	Ms. O/Big O	Main role (seasons 1–3)	
2014	Remedy	Crying Girl		
2014	Apple Mortgage Cake	Young Angela	Television film	
2015–2017	Wishenpoof!	Penelope	Voice	
2015	Man Seeking Woman	Victoria		
2015	Playdate	Molly		
2016	Super Why!	Serena/Dot	Voice, 2 episodes	
2016–2018	Little People	Mia	Voice, 25 episodes	
2017–2020	Dino Dana	Riley		
2018–2021	Esme & Roy	Esme	Main role; Voice	
2018	Origin	Ruby Touré	1 episode; Guest	
2018	Odd Squad: World Turned Odd	Ms. O	Television film	
2019	See	Haniwa (Age 12)	1 episode; Guest	
2020	Mighty Express	Dusty	Voice, 3 episodes	
Corn & Peg	Horse Kid #04 (Pool Girl)/Horse Kid #06	Voice, 2 episodes		
Xavier Riddle and the Secret Museum	Harriet Tubman	Voice, 1 episode; Guest		
2021	The Parker Andersons/Amelia Parker	Amelia Parker	Main role	
2021	Pikwik Pack	JJ Giraffe	Voice, 1 episode; Guest	
2022	Detention Adventure	Iggy	3 episodes	
2023	Galapagos X	Orchid	Voice	
2023	Pinkalicious & Peterrific	Fuchsia	Voice, 1 episode; Guest	
2023	Shelved	Daisy	1 episode; Guest	
2024	Popularity Papers	Addison	2 episodes	
2024	The Umbrella Academy	Claire Hargreeves	6 episodes	
2026	Finding Her Edge	Riley Monroe	Main cast	
