= Jesus Henry Christ =

- Theatrical release poster
- Directed by: Dennis Lee
- Written by: Dennis Lee
- Produced by: Sukee Chew; Lisa Roberts Gillan; Philip Rose
- Starring: Jason Spevack; Toni Collette; Michael Sheen; Samantha Weinstein; Cameron Kennedy; Mark Caven; Paul Braunstein
- Cinematography: Danny Moder
- Edited by: Joan Sobel
- Music by: David Torn; Simon Taufique
- Production companies: Reliance Entertainment; IM Global; Red Om Films
- Distributed by: Entertainment One
- Release dates: April 2011 (Tribeca); April 20, 2012
- Running time: 92 minutes
- Country: United States
- Language: English
- Box office: $20,183

Jesus Henry Christ is a 2011 American comedy film based on Dennis Lee's student short film of the same name. It was released on April 20, 2012. The film was directed by Lee, who also penned the screenplay. The film was produced by Joseph Boccia, Sukee Chew, Lisa Roberts Gillan, Deepak Nayar, Julia Roberts, Philip Rose, and Katie Wells. The film stars Jason Spevack, Toni Collette, Michael Sheen, Samantha Weinstein, Frank Moore, Mark Caven, and Paul Braunstein.

== Plot ==
Henry (Jason Spevack) is a precocious young boy, conceived in a petri-dish and raised by his single mother, Patricia (Toni Collette), and is smarter than all of his peers. However, the one question he can't answer is, who is his father? Henry's attempts at locating his father led him to Dr. Slavkin O'Hara (Michael Sheen), a university professor who has decided to raise his daughter, Audrey (Samantha Weinstein), as a psychology experiment in a world free of gender bias. Patricia starts fearing that she's losing her son, Audrey wishes she didn't have a father, Dr. O'Hara has no idea how to keep his daughter happy, and Henry may just have found the family he was looking for.

== Cast ==
- Jason Spevack as Henry James Herman
- Toni Collette as Patricia Herman
- Michael Sheen as Dr. Slavkin O'Hara
- Samantha Weinstein as Audrey O'Hara
- Frank Moore as Stan Herman
- Austin MacDonald as Brian the Bully
- Cameron Kennedy as Jimmy Herman
- Mark Caven as President Sullivan
- Paul Braunstein as Dr. Gunther Flowers
- Mark MacDonald as Tim Herman
- Mickey MacDonald as Tom Herman
- Hannah Bridgen as Young Patricia Herman
- Jamie Johnston as Young Billy Herman

== Release ==
The film had its world premiere in April 2011 at the Tribeca Film Festival before going on general release in the US on April 20, 2012. It grossed $20,183 at the box office.

== Reception ==
As of June 2020, the film holds a 22% approval rating on Rotten Tomatoes, based on 23 reviews with an average rating of 4.06 out of 10. On Metacritic it has a score of 41% based on reviews from 12 critics, indicating "mixed or average" reviews.

John Anderson of Variety magazine said that the film is "Too deliberately eccentric" but that it "does feature some standout performances and a refreshingly unconventional approach to telling its slight story."

=== Accolades ===
Year	Award	Category	Recipient(s)	Result	Ref.
2013	Young Artist Award	Best Performance in a Feature Film - Leading Young Actor	Jason Spevack	Nominated	
2013	Young Artist Award	Best Performance in a Feature Film - Supporting Young Actor	Austin MacDonald	Won	
