= Dino Dan =

Canadian TV series

- Created by: J.J. Johnson
- Directed by: J.J. Johnson
- Starring: Jason Spevack; Sydney Kuhne; Isaac Durnford; Jaclyn Forbes; Allana Harkin; Ricardo Hoyos; Trek Buccino; Keana Bastidas; Sarah Carver; Andrea Martin; Jayne Eastwood; Mark McKinney
- Theme music composer: Michael-Paul Ella
- Composer: Michael-Paul Ella
- Country of origin: Canada
- Original language: English
- No. of seasons: 8
- No. of episodes: 103 (list of episodes)

Production
- Executive producers: Blair Powers; Bruce Johnson
- Producers: Matthew J.R. Bishop; J.J. Johnson; Blair Powers
- Production locations: Toronto, Ontario, Canada
- Editors: Matthew J.R. Bishop; Liam Ward
- Camera setup: Single-Camera
- Running time: 22–23 minutes
- Production company: Sinking Ship Entertainment

Original release
- Network: TVOKids; Access; Knowledge Network; SCN
- Release: January 4, 2010 – August 30, 2019

Dino Dan is a Canadian television series created and directed by J.J. Johnson. The series premiered on TVOKids in Canada on January 4, 2010, and ended on August 30, 2019. In the US, the series premiered on the Nick Jr. Channel on October 17, 2010 as an acquired series. The show was produced by Sinking Ship Entertainment, in association with TVOKids, Access, Knowledge Network, and SCN. A sequel of the series, Dino Dana, premiered on Amazon Prime on May 26, 2017. The show premiered on Universal Kids on October 6, 2018, three years after Nick Jr.'s rights to the series expired.

On February 4, 2013, it was reported that CITV had acquired and secured rights to air the series in the UK and eventually to re-air it on the channel.

== Plot ==
In this series that combines live action with CGI animation, a young boy named Dan Henderson has a magic dino field guide that allows him to see dinosaurs in real life. He has many adventures, uncovering clues about the past and teaching others scientific information ranging from new species to dinosaur vocabulary.

== Dino Dan: Trek's Adventures ==
A follow-up season starring Dan's younger brother, Trek, began airing in 2013. Trek, now age ten, is also able to see dinosaurs and spends his time learning about them as his brother did. There are fifteen new dinosaurs from Albertosaurus to Microraptor in this series. Dan did not have time to do his experiments because he has to help his father, so he asks Trek to do them for him. Although Trek becomes the main character for the episodes, Jason Spevack made periodic appearances as Dan throughout Trek's Adventures, though much of the original cast remained largely unchanged.

== Dino Dan cast ==
- Jason Spevack as Dan Henderson
- Sydney Kuhne as Angie
- Isaac Durnford as Cory Schluter
- Jaclyn Forbes as Kami
- Allana Harkin as Mom (Melissa Jessica Henderson)
- Ricardo Hoyos as Ricardo Sanchez
- Trek Buccino as Trek Henderson
- Tristan Samuel as Tristan
- Keana Bastidas as Jordan
- Sarah Carver as Mrs. Carver
- Andrea Martin as Mrs. Hahn
- Jayne Eastwood as Dan's grandmother (Ms. Currie)
- Mark McKinney as Mr. Drumheller
- Jon Dore as Uncle Jack
- Jason Hopley as Jim the Zoologist
- Seán Cullen as Mr. Paluxy
- Pat Thornton as Mr. Schluter, Cory's dad

=== Trek's Adventures ===
- Trek Buccino as Trek Henderson
- Jordyn Negri as Hannah Schluter
- Katherine Forrester as Penelope
- Colin Petierre as Bobby Caperaz
- Allana Harkin as Mom (Melissa Jessica Henderson)
- Jayne Eastwood as Trek's grandmother (Ms. Currie)
- Connor Price as Liam, Penelope's brother
- Sarah Carver as Mrs. Carver
- Jason Spevack as Dan Henderson
- Seán Cullen as Mr. Paluxy
- Pat Thornton as Mr. Schluter, Hannah's dad
- Dale Yim as Mr. Caperaz, Bobby's dad
- Naomi Snieckus as Penelope's mom

== Awards ==
2010: Nominated for a Gemini Award for Best Preschool-to-4th Grade Program or Series

2010: Won the Shaw Rocket Prize for best independently produced Canadian children's, youth, or family program

2010: Won the Young Artist Award for Most Outstanding Young Ensemble In A TV Series

2014: Nominated for the Canadian Screen Award for Best Writing in a Children's or Youth Program or Series

2015: Won the Daytime Emmy Award for Outstanding Pre-School Children's Series

2016: Nominated for the Daytime Emmy Award for Outstanding Pre-School Children's Series
