= Jason Spevack =

Canadian actor and filmmaker

- Occupations: Actor, filmmaker
- Years active: 2003–present

Jason Spevack is a Canadian-American actor and filmmaker. He is perhaps best known for his roles in Dino Dan, Fever Pitch, Sunshine Cleaning and Ramona and Beezus, as well as receiving a Young Artist Award nomination as Best Leading Young Actor in a Feature Film for his role in the 2012 comedy film Jesus Henry Christ.

== Life and career ==
He made his debut to the film and television industry in 2003 appearing in three short films entitled The School, Terminal Venus, and Stalker. He then appeared in two television films and the television show Kevin Hill in 2004. In 2005 he appeared in 72 Hours: True Crime, The Life and Hard Times of Guy Terrifico, 1-800-Missing, and "Crazy for Christmas", Fever Pitch. In 2007, he appeared in Instant Star, ReGenesis, State of Mind, and Rent-a-Goalie. He can also be seen in Sunshine Cleaning as Oscar Lorkowski, a little boy that gets expelled from school, Dino Dan as Dan Henderson, the main character that likes dinosaurs, and Ramona and Beezus as Howie Kemp, Ramona's best friend.

== Filmography ==
=== Film ===
| Year | Film | Role | Notes |
|---|---|---|---|
| 2003 | The School | Billy Brandt | Short film |
| 2003 | Terminal Venus | Sebastian | Short film |
| 2003 | Stalker | Josh McCann | Short film |
| 2004 | Love Rules | Teddy | Television movie |
| 2004 | Heaven Is a Place That Starts with 'H' | Andrew | Short film |
| 2004 | A Very Married Christmas | Kevin | Television movie |
| 2005 | The Life and Hard Times of Guy Terrifico | Farley Horton | |
| 2005 | I Do, They Don't | Nathan Lewellyn | Television movie |
| 2005 | Fever Pitch | Young Ben Wrightman | |
| 2005 | Crazy for Christmas | Trevor McManus-Johnson | Television movie |
| 2006 | Hollywoodland | Kenneth Giles | |
| 2006 | An American Girl on the Home Front | Jimmy - Boy Speller | Television movie |
| 2007 | The Stone Angel | Young Marvin | |
| 2008 | Sunshine Cleaning | Oscar Lorkowski | Supporting Role |
| 2010 | Ramona and Beezus | Howie Kemp | Supporting Role |
| 2011 | Jesus Henry Christ | Henry James Hermin | Lead Role |
| 2011 | Oliver Bump's Birthday | Oliver Bump | Lead Role |

=== Television ===
| Year | Television | Role | Episode/Notes |
|---|---|---|---|
| 2004 | Kevin Hill | Child | "Making the Grade" |
| 2005 | 72 Hours: True Crime | Jean Marc Rocancour | "The French Con" |
| 2005 | 72 Hours: True Crime | Jean Marc Rocancour | "Hustler" |
| 2005 | 1-800-Missing | Danny | "Off the Grid" |
| 2005 | This Is Wonderland | Noah Willis | Season 2, Episode 12 |
| 2005 | This Is Wonderland | Noah Willis | Season 3, Episode 4 |
| 2006 | Talk to Me | Andy Oliver | Never aired television series |
| 2006 | True Crime Scene | Damon Routier | "Family Secrets" |
| 2007 | Instant Star | Ned | "18: Part 2" |
| 2007 | ReGenesis | Kyle | "The God of Commerce" |
| 2007 | State of Mind | Aaron Pfeiffer | "O Rose, Thou Art Sick" |
| 2007 | Rent-a-Goalie | Charity Kid | "Domi Daze" |
| 2007 | The Rick Mercer Report | Boy in Toy Recall Spoof | Season 5, Episode 2 |
| 2008 | Super Why! | Newsboy | "Comic Book: Attack of the Eraser", Voice Role |
| 2008 | The Rick Mercer Report | Son in 'Coffee Ad' | Season 5, Episode 9 |
| 2009 | Overruled! | Noah | "The Truth Shall Set You Free" |
| 2010 | The Rick Mercer Report | Son in Political Olympic Ad Spoof | Season 7, Episode 13 |
| 2010 | The Rick Mercer Report | Tax Revenue Kid | Season 7, Episode 19 |
| 2010 | The Rick Mercer Report | Rick's son | Season 8, Episode 2 |
| 2010 | R.L. Stine's The Haunting Hour | Mark | "Ghostly Stare" |
| 2010–2013 | Dino Dan | Dan Henderson | Lead role |
| 2011 | Murdoch Mysteries | 'Dorrie' | "Dial M for Murdoch" S4 Ep8 |
| 2011 | Being Human | Bernie Lanham | "I Want You Back (From the Dead)" |
| 2011 | Being Human | Bernie Lanham | "Children Shouldn't Play with Undead Things" |
| 2013 | Cracked | Wyatt Burke | "How the Light Gets In" |
| 2013–2014 | Dino Dan: Trek's Adventures | Dan Henderson | 8 episodes |
| 2017–2020 | Dino Dana | Dan Henderson | 3 episodes |

=== Filmmaking ===
| Year | Title | |
|---|---|---|
| 2010 | Dino Dan | Writer, "Dino Party/Training Wings" |
| 2013 | Dino Dan: Trek's Adventures | Associate producer and writer, "Beach Blanket Dino/Robots and Dinosaurs" |
| 2014 | Blue | Short film, his filmmaking debut |
| 2015 | Annedroids | Associate producer, 2 episodes |

== Awards and nominations ==
| Award | Year | Category | Result | Work |
|---|---|---|---|---|
| Young Artist Award | 2010 | Best Performance in a Feature Film - Supporting Young Actor | Nominated | Sunshine Cleaning |
| Young Artist Award | 2011 | Best Performance in a TV Series (Comedy or Drama) - Leading Young Actor | Nominated | Dino Dan |
| Young Artist Award | 2011 | Outstanding Young Ensemble in a TV Series | Won | Dino Dan |
| Young Artist Award | 2012 | Best Performance in a Short Film - Young Actor | Nominated | Oliver Bump's Birthday |
| Young Artist Award | 2012 | Best Performance in a TV Series - Guest Starring Young Actor 11-13 | Nominated | R.L. Stine's The Haunting Hour |
| Young Artist Award | 2013 | Best Performance in a Feature Film - Leading Young Actor | Nominated | Jesus Henry Christ |
