= Dino Dana =

Canadian children's television series

- Genre: Television series
- Created by: J. J. Johnson
- Starring: Michela Luci; Saara Chaudry; Nicola Correia-Damude; Amish Patel; Bill Cobbs
- Country of origin: Canada
- Original language: English
- No. of seasons: 4
- No. of episodes: 52

Production
- Production locations: Toronto, Ontario, Canada
- Production company: Sinking Ship Entertainment

Original release
- Network: TVOKids
- Release: May 24, 2017 – April 16, 2020

Dino Dana is a Canadian comedy-drama science fiction television series created and directed by J. J. Johnson. The series was developed as a follow-up to Dino Dan and premiered on Amazon Prime Video on May 27, 2017. Dino Dana: The Movie was released on Prime Video in September 2020. It was originally going to be a theatrical release on March 21, 2020, but was delayed and later canceled due to the COVID-19 pandemic in Canada. A new spin-off of Dino Dan & Dino Dana, titled Dino Dex, debuted in October 20, 2024.

== Plot ==
A sequel series to Dino Dan, Dino Dana focuses on a nine-year-old girl named Dana Jain who sets out to complete "Dino experiments" that teach her more about dinosaurs, pterosaurs, prehistoric marine reptiles, synapsids, prehistoric insects and prehistoric mammals. She often also increases her understanding of life and grows in her personal life as a result of the lessons learned while solving the experiments. Other characters include her older stepsister, Saara; her mother, Ava; her stepfather, Ahman; Gloria, her maternal grandmother; and Dexter, her baby half-brother born at the beginning of season 3. Jason Spevack and Trek Buccino also make periodic guest appearances as Dan and Trek Henderson.

The series combines live action with CGI animation.

== Cast ==
- Michela Luci as Dana Jain
- Saara Chaudry as Saara Jain, Dana's older step-sister
- Nicola Correia-Damude as Mom (Eva Jain)
- Amish Patel as Step-Dad (Aman Jain)
- Rayan Mahklouf as Dexter Jain, Dana and Saara's younger half-brother
- Maria Vacratsis as Grandma
- Eric Peterson as Grandpa
- Ali Hassan as Uncle Ravi
- Nelu Handa as Anjali, Uncle Ravi’s girlfriend
- Bill Cobbs as Mr. Hendrickson, Dana's neighbour
- Laaibah Alvi as Young Saara
- Loretta Yu as Cai (recurring)
- Anna Cathcart as Robyn (recurring)
- Olivia Presti as Olivia (recurring)
- Millie Davis as Riley (recurring)
- Jayne Eastwood as Ms Currie
- Jason Spevack as Dan Henderson
- Trek Buccino as Trek Henderson

== Episodes ==
Season	Episodes	Originally released	
Season	Episodes	First released	Last released
1	13	May 24, 2017	August 17, 2017
2	13	March 24, 2018	August 4, 2018
3	13	May 22, 2019	July 3, 2019
4	13	April 16, 2020	April 16, 2020

== Awards ==
Awards and nominations for Dino Dana
Award	Year	Category	Recipients	Result	Ref(s)
Kidscreen Awards	2017	Best New Series	Dino Dana	Won	
Kidscreen Awards	2018	Best Non-Animated or Mixed Series	Dino Dana	Won	
Canadian Screen Awards	2018	Best Direction, Children's or Youth	J.J. Johnson	Nominated	
Canadian Screen Awards	2018	Best Performance, Children's or Youth	Michela Luci	Nominated	
Canadian Screen Awards	2019	Best Pre-School Program or Series	Dino Dana	Won	
Canadian Screen Awards	2019	Best Cross-Platform Project - Children's and Youth	Dino Dana Digital	Won	
Canadian Screen Awards	2019	Best Direction, Children's or Youth	J.J. Johnson	Nominated	
Canadian Screen Awards	2019	Best Writing, Children's or Youth	J.J. Johnson, Christin Simms and Nathalie Youglai	Nominated	
Canadian Screen Awards	2019	Best Performance, Children's or Youth	Michela Luci	Nominated	
Canadian Screen Awards	2019	Best Performance, Children's or Youth	Saara Chaudry	Nominated	
Daytime Emmy Award	2018	Outstanding Preschool Children's Series	Dino Dana	Nominated	
Daytime Emmy Award	2019	Outstanding Preschool Children's Series	Dino Dana	Nominated	
Daytime Emmy Award	2019	Outstanding Performer in a Children's, Family Viewing or Special Class Program	Michela Luci	Won	
Daytime Emmy Award	2019	Outstanding Writing in a Children's, Pre-school Children's or Family Viewing Program	J.J. Johnson, Christin Simms and Nathalie Younglai	Nominated	
Daytime Emmy Award	2019	Outstanding Directing in a Children's, Pre-school Children's or Family Viewing Program	J.J. Johnson	Nominated	
Daytime Emmy Award	2019	Outstanding Art direction/Set Direction/Scenic Design	Amanda Vernuccio, Tyler McFarland and Kevin Morra	Nominated	
Daytime Emmy Award	2019	Outstanding Lighting Direction	George Lajtai CSC	Nominated	
Daytime Emmy Award	2019	Outstanding Sound Editing for a Live Action Program	Sean W. Karp, Will Preventis, Noah Siegel, Charles Duchesne, Blag Ahilov and Jakob Thiesen	Nominated	
Youth Media Alliance	2019	Best Program, Live Action Scripted and Non-Scripted, Preschool	Dino Dana	Won	
Youth Media Alliance	2019	Outstanding Youth Performer	Saara Chaudry	Nominated	

== Broadcast ==
On October 6, 2016, on YouTube, short introductory Dino Dana clips were first published, reusing footage from the past two shows. Dino Dana launched on May 24, 2017 on TVOKids in Canada. Two days later, the show premiered on May 26 on Amazon Prime Video in the US and UK. In Australia Dino Dana screens on ABC Kids.In the United Arab Emirates, it premiered on e-Junior. In Latin America, it premiered on Nat Geo Kids Latin America.
