= Isaac Durnford =

Canadian actor

- Born: Isaac Durnford; February 26, 1998 (age 28); Ontario, Canada
- Occupation: actor
- Years active: 2002–2012

Isaac Durnford (born February 26, 1998) is a Canadian actor, best known for his role as Cory Schluter in the Canadian TV series Dino Dan.

== Filmography ==
Year	Film/show	Role
2004	Blue Murder	Jack Garrett
2007	A Dennis the Menace Christmas	Jack Bratcher
2007	Mr. Magorium's Wonder Emporium	Jason, Who's a Little Too Curious
2009	Majority Rules	Les Richards
2009	You Are Here	Tariq
2010–2012	Dino Dan	Cory Schluter
