= List of Dino Dan episodes =

Children's television series episode list

Dino Dan is a Canadian television series that was created and directed by J. J. Johnson. The series premiered on TVOKids in Canada on January 4, 2010, and on Nickelodeon's Nick Jr. Channel in the United States on October 17, 2010. A third season of the series, Dino Dana, has been aired on TVOKids in Canada and instead of being aired on Nick Jr. in the United States it is streamed on Amazon.com.

== Series overview ==
| Season | Episodes | First Aired | Last Aired |
|---|---|---|---|
| 1 | 13 (26) | January 4, 2010 | January 9, 2011 |
| 2 | 13 (26) | August 26, 2010 | October 16, 2011 |
| 3 | 13 (26) | September 3, 2013 | March 9, 2016 |
| 4 | 13 (26) | January 1, 2014 | March 9, 2017 |
| 5 | 13 | May 24, 2017 | August 19, 2017 |
| 6 | 13 | March 19, 2018 | August 4, 2018 |
| 7 | 13 | May 20, 2019 | July 26, 2019 |
| 8 | 13 | August 14, 2019 | August 30, 2019 |

== Episodes ==
=== Season 1 ===
| No. overall | No. in season | Segments | Dinosaurs | Dino Dan's Field Guide (Nick Jr.) | American Premiere (Nick Jr.) | Canadian Premiere (TVO Kids) |
|---|---|---|---|---|---|---|
| 1 | 1 | "The Chicken or the Dino" | Dromaeosaurus, Brachiosaurus, Baby Brachiosaurus/Stygimoloch, Brachiosaurus | Dromaeosaurus | October 17, 2010 | January 4, 2010 |
| 1 | 1 | "Bones in the Backyard" | Dromaeosaurus, Brachiosaurus, Baby Brachiosaurus/Stygimoloch, Brachiosaurus | Dromaeosaurus | October 17, 2010 | January 4, 2010 |
"The Chicken or the Dino": When Dan's class studies eggs in science, Dan finds a Brachiosaurus egg among the many chicken eggs. "Bones in the Backyard": Dan's little brother Trek finds a Stygimoloch fossil in the school sandbox at recess, and the school art class soon assists in making a model of the dinosaur to identify the bone.
| 2 | 2 | "Masked Confusion" | Edmontosaurus, Baby Edmontosaurus/Corythosaurus, Dromaeosaurus, Tyrannosaurus rex | Dromaeosaurus | October 18, 2010 | January 18, 2010 |
| 2 | 2 | "Trouble Clef" | Edmontosaurus, Baby Edmontosaurus/Corythosaurus, Dromaeosaurus, Tyrannosaurus rex | Dromaeosaurus | October 18, 2010 | January 18, 2010 |
"Masked Confusion": After a failed attempt to infiltrate an Edmontosaurus herd, Dan uses his art class resources to upgrade his disguise with a better mask. "Trouble Clef": Dan's music class allows him to understand the world of Corythosaurus communication when he learns to play the French horn.
| 3 | 3 | "There's a Compsognathus Under My Bed" | Compsognathus/Quetzalcoatlus | Brachiosaurus | October 27, 2010 | January 25, 2010 |
| 3 | 3 | "Art for Pterosaurs' Sake" | Compsognathus/Quetzalcoatlus | Brachiosaurus | October 27, 2010 | January 25, 2010 |
"There's a Compsognathus Under My Bed": Dan employs Trek to help him study a Compsognathus before bedtime, and also liberate their pet pug Doug when their mother accuses him of stealing her shoes. "Art for Pterosaurs' Sake": During his art class, Dan inspires the class to make a kite that looks like a Quetzalcoatlus.
| 4 | 4 | "Tooth or Consequences" | Edmontosaurus, Tyrannosaurus rex/Triceratops, Tyrannosaurus rex, Dromaeosaurus, Spinosaurus | Brachiosaurus | January 16, 2011 | February 1, 2010 |
| 4 | 4 | "Dinosicles" | Edmontosaurus, Tyrannosaurus rex/Triceratops, Tyrannosaurus rex, Dromaeosaurus, Spinosaurus | Brachiosaurus | January 16, 2011 | February 1, 2010 |
"Tooth or Consequences": Dan tries to identify the Edmontosaurus's diet while he, Trek and Ricardo take their dentist appointments. "Dinosicles": Dan and his family join Cory and Jordan at a sledding hill, while he discovers the T-rex's scavenger side with a snow Triceratops.
| 5 | 5 | "The Case of the Mystery Dino" | Spinosaurus, Quetzalcoatlus, Pterodactylus/Brachiosaurus, Diplodocus | Brachiosaurus | October 19, 2010 | February 14, 2010 |
| 5 | 5 | "Gas-o-saurus" | Spinosaurus, Quetzalcoatlus, Pterodactylus/Brachiosaurus, Diplodocus | Brachiosaurus | October 19, 2010 | February 14, 2010 |
"The Case of the Mystery Dino": Dan's science class is learning about coprolites, and he teams up with Jordan to learn the identity of a fish-eating dinosaur. "Gas-o-saurus": Dan, Kami and Ricardo do a science presentation on the Brachiosaurus, and how the sauropod's flatulence potentially caused the extinction of the dinosaurs.
| 6 | 6 | "He Shoots, He Roars" | Dromaeosaurus, Tyrannosaurus rex, Triceratops, Stegosaurus/Euoplocephalus | Dromaeosaurus | October 25, 2010 | February 8, 2010 |
| 6 | 6 | "A Winter Tail" | Dromaeosaurus, Tyrannosaurus rex, Triceratops, Stegosaurus/Euoplocephalus | Dromaeosaurus | October 25, 2010 | February 8, 2010 |
"He Shoots, He Roars": Dan sets on a quest to find out which dinosaurs are warm-blooded. "A Winter Tail": Dan sets out to see the Euoplocephalus use its tail in self-defense, but the ankylosaurid is not easily intimidated.
| 7 | 7 | "A Pterosaur in the House" | Pterodactylus, Quetzalcoatlus/Triceratops, Tyrannosaurus rex, Baby Triceratopses | Brachiosaurus | October 17, 2010 | April 11, 2010 |
| 7 | 7 | "A Model Dino" | Pterodactylus, Quetzalcoatlus/Triceratops, Tyrannosaurus rex, Baby Triceratopses | Brachiosaurus | October 17, 2010 | April 11, 2010 |
"A Pterosaur in the House": Dan's mother finds a Pterodactylus in the attic, prompting the whole family and the visiting Angie to attempt to lure it outside. "Model Dino": Dan uses art class as a chance to disguise his remote controlled car, allowing him to film inside a Triceratops nest.
| 8 | 8 | "Copy Dino" | Spinosaurus, Triceratops, Baby Triceratops/Dromaeosaurus, Diplodocus | Brachiosaurus | October 19, 2010 | April 18, 2010 |
| 8 | 8 | "Lunch Bag Bandit" | Spinosaurus, Triceratops, Baby Triceratops/Dromaeosaurus, Diplodocus | Brachiosaurus | October 19, 2010 | April 18, 2010 |
"Copy Dino": Dan has to teach a baby Triceratops the art of self defense to get it past a preying Spinosaurus. "Lunch Bag Bandit": Dan utilizes his mother's finger dusting trick to find the Dromaeosaurus that stole Cory's snack.
| 9 | 9 | "Dino Dent" | Stygimoloch, Stegosaurus, Euoplocephalus, Tyrannosaurus rex/Triceratops, Tyrannosaurus rex | Dromaeosaurus | January 9, 2011 | May 15, 2010 |
| 9 | 9 | "Active Imagination" | Stygimoloch, Stegosaurus, Euoplocephalus, Tyrannosaurus rex/Triceratops, Tyrannosaurus rex | Dromaeosaurus | January 9, 2011 | May 15, 2010 |
"Dino Dent": Dan recruits Angie to help him find the dinosaur that dented a school bus. "Active Imagination": During a meeting in the park, Dan struggles to understand why despite being a larger opponent, the T-rex backs down from a Triceratops.
| 10 | 10 | "Dino Trap" | Compsognathus, Tyrannosaurus rex, Baby T-Rex/Spinosaurus | Dromaeosaurus | October 26, 2010 | June 12, 2010 |
| 10 | 10 | "Big Bad Spinosaurus" | Compsognathus, Tyrannosaurus rex, Baby T-Rex/Spinosaurus | Dromaeosaurus | October 26, 2010 | June 12, 2010 |
"Dino Trap": A Compsognathus is ruining flowers in the Henderson backyard, and Dan is set on trapping it. "Big Bad Spinosaurus": Dan tells a dino-fied story of Little Red Riding Hood.
| 11 | 11 | "Name-a-saurus" | Diplodocus, Tyrannosaurus rex, Spinosaurus, Dromaeosaurus, Brachiosaurus/Dromaeosaurus | Corythosaurus | May 8, 2011 | June 19, 2010 |
| 11 | 11 | "Where's Dino?" | Diplodocus, Tyrannosaurus rex, Spinosaurus, Dromaeosaurus, Brachiosaurus/Dromaeosaurus | Corythosaurus | May 8, 2011 | June 19, 2010 |
"Name-a-saurus": Dan struggles on deciding on what to name the new dinosaur, but then it was actually a Diplodocus which he have seen for the first time and mistakes it for a new dinosaur. "Where's Dino": While at the park with Trek and Uncle Jack, Dan finds a feather that he believes to be from a Dromaeosaurus, though the whole family is on a chase when Doug runs off trying to look for it.
| 12 | 12 | "Stop Motion Dino" | Tyrannosaurus rex/Corythosaurus, Euoplocephalus, Tyrannosaurus rex, Stygimoloch | Quetzalcoatlus (Moody Dino/Stop Motion Dino) | January 15, 2011 | September 25, 2010 |
| 12 | 12 | "To Flee Or Not To Flee" | Tyrannosaurus rex/Corythosaurus, Euoplocephalus, Tyrannosaurus rex, Stygimoloch | Quetzalcoatlus (Moody Dino/Stop Motion Dino) | January 15, 2011 | September 25, 2010 |
"Stop Motion Dino": Dan's art class is learning the art of stop motion, but things come to a head when Dan and Angie quarrel about how the T-rex model should look. "To Flee or Not to Flee": The class uses an acting lesson to help Dan figure out if a Stygimoloch would run from or charge at a T-rex.
| 13 | 13 | "Moody Dino" | Stegosaurus, Spinosaurus/Compsognathus, Tyrannosaurus rex, Dromaeosaurus, Diplodocus, Stegosaurus, Euoplocephalus, Corythosaurus, Triceratops | Euoplocephalus (Twas a Dinosaur/To Flee or not to Flee) | December 12, 2010 | August 27, 2010 |
| 13 | 13 | "Twas a Dinosaur" | Stegosaurus, Spinosaurus/Compsognathus, Tyrannosaurus rex, Dromaeosaurus, Diplodocus, Stegosaurus, Euoplocephalus, Corythosaurus, Triceratops | Euoplocephalus (Twas a Dinosaur/To Flee or not to Flee) | December 12, 2010 | August 27, 2010 |
"Moody Dino": Dan gets intrigued by the sight of a Stegosaurus changing the colors of its plates, and sets out to find what it does by doing so. "Twas a Dinosaur": The class has to rewrite their favorite Christmas poems, but Dan has trouble rewriting Twas The Night Before Christmas.

=== Season 2 ===
| No. overall | No. in season | Segments | Dinosaurs | American Premiere (Nick Jr.) | Canadian Premiere (TVO Kids) |
|---|---|---|---|---|---|
| 14 | 1 | "Fishing For Dinos" | Spinosaurus, Quetzalcoatlus/Stegosaurus | March 15, 2014 | October 21, 2010 |
| 14 | 1 | "Dino Trackers" | Spinosaurus, Quetzalcoatlus/Stegosaurus | March 15, 2014 | October 21, 2010 |
"Fishing For Dinos": The Hendersons go on a picnic, and Dan goes fishing with his Uncle Jack, with the pair using the same fishing strategies as prehistoric animals. "Dino Trackers": Dan embarks on a dino tracking adventure to track a Stegosaurus to photograph, but he also needs to take his little brother Trek with him, and Trek is far from a silent person.
| 15 | 2 | "Dino Doug" | Edmontosaurus baby, Dromaeosaurus, Edmontosaurus/Tyrannosaurus rex, Corythosaurus | September 21, 2013 | October 26, 2010 |
| 15 | 2 | "T-Rex Bedtime" | Edmontosaurus baby, Dromaeosaurus, Edmontosaurus/Tyrannosaurus rex, Corythosaurus | September 21, 2013 | October 26, 2010 |
"Dino Doug": While Dan goes shopping with his mother, he leaves a dinosaur egg he found under Doug's care, and subsequently has to safely return the resulting hatchling to its mother. "T-Rex Bedtime": Dan uses a sleepover with Cory and Ricardo as a chance to see if the T-rex is nocturnal.
| 16 | 3 | "Dino Party" | Dromaeosaurus, Triceratops, Stegosaurus, Stygimoloch/Pterodactylus baby, Compsognathus | September 30, 2015 | October 28, 2010 |
| 16 | 3 | "Training Wings" | Dromaeosaurus, Triceratops, Stegosaurus, Stygimoloch/Pterodactylus baby, Compsognathus | September 30, 2015 | October 28, 2010 |
"Dino Party": On Dan's birthday, Dan and his friends must follow clues to find out what dinosaur is the shape of Dan's birthday cake. "Training Wings": Dan finds a baby Pterodactylus while biking in the park, and has to multitask between teaching it to fly and teaching Trek how to bike without training wheels.
| 17 | 4 | "Prehistoric Zoo" | Tyrannosaurus rex baby, Triceratops, Brachiosaurus, Corythosaurus, Tyrannosaurus rex/Dromaeosaurus | March 8, 2016 | November 3, 2010 |
| 17 | 4 | "Cops and Dinos" | Tyrannosaurus rex baby, Triceratops, Brachiosaurus, Corythosaurus, Tyrannosaurus rex/Dromaeosaurus | March 8, 2016 | November 3, 2010 |
"Prehistoric Zoo": While at the zoo with his grandmother, Dan finds a baby T-rex lost, and while finding its mother, sees several similarities between dinosaurs and modern-day animals. "Cops and Dinos": Dan gets a chance to test the speed of a Dromaeosaurus when his mother visits his class at school.
| 18 | 5 | "Ready? Set? Dino!" | Tyrannosaurus rex, Spinosaurus, Stygimoloch/Tyrannosaurus rex, Tyrannosaurus rex baby, Stygimoloch | March 9, 2016 | November 4, 2010 |
| 18 | 5 | "To Catch a Dino" | Tyrannosaurus rex, Spinosaurus, Stygimoloch/Tyrannosaurus rex, Tyrannosaurus rex baby, Stygimoloch | March 9, 2016 | November 4, 2010 |
"Ready? Set? Dino!": Dan sets to find out if a T-rex is faster than a Spinosaurus. "To Catch a Dino": To help Cory sleep, Dan tells him a bedtime story starring two cavemen trying to catch a pet dinosaur.
| 19 | 6 | "The Dino Did it" | Stygimoloch, Euoplocephalus, Diplodocus, Quetzalcoatlus/Dromaeosaurus, Tyrannosaurus rex | April 27, 2016 | November 6, 2010 |
| 19 | 6 | "Air Dino" | Stygimoloch, Euoplocephalus, Diplodocus, Quetzalcoatlus/Dromaeosaurus, Tyrannosaurus rex | April 27, 2016 | November 6, 2010 |
"The Dino Did it": Dan tells a story starring Ricardo as a world-class private eye looking to find which dinosaur stole a bouquet of prized flowers from a dinner party. "Air Dino": While playing basketball against Mr, Drumheller, Dan uses the teamwork tactics of three Dromaeosauruses to score the winning shot.
| 20 | 7 | "Dino Watering Hole" | Dromaeosaurus, Edmontosaurus baby, Triceratops baby, Brachiosaurus baby, Edmontosaurus, Triceratops, Brachiosaurus/Edmontosaurus, Edmontosaurus baby, Tyrannosaurus rex, Quetzalcoatlus, Brachiosaurus | TBA | November 8, 2010 |
| 20 | 7 | "Dino Dance" | Dromaeosaurus, Edmontosaurus baby, Triceratops baby, Brachiosaurus baby, Edmontosaurus, Triceratops, Brachiosaurus/Edmontosaurus, Edmontosaurus baby, Tyrannosaurus rex, Quetzalcoatlus, Brachiosaurus | TBA | November 8, 2010 |
"Dino Watering Hole": Dan and Trek are banned from going outside until they clean their rooms, but things go haywire when several baby dinosaurs end up trapped in the backyard and are about to be eaten by a hungry Dromaeosaurus. "Dino Dance": Mr. Drumheller has the class split into separate groups to work out their own dance routines, and Dan is inspired to incorporate dinosaur moves in his group's.
| 21 | 8 | "Captain Cory" | Tyrannosaurus rex, Compsognathus, Dromaeosaurus, Pterodactylus/Stygimoloch, Triceratops, Edmontosaurus | TBA | November 10, 2010 |
| 21 | 8 | "Dino Race" | Tyrannosaurus rex, Compsognathus, Dromaeosaurus, Pterodactylus/Stygimoloch, Triceratops, Edmontosaurus | TBA | November 10, 2010 |
"Captain Cory": Dan tells a dinosaur-themed pirate story starring Cory, Angie, and Ricardo as a pirate crew searching for treasure. "Dino Race": On a visit to a go-kart track with Trek and their grandmother, Dan ponders on the speed of a Triceratops, Edmontosaurus, and Stygimoloch.
| 22 | 9 | "Hard Hat, Long Neck" | Brachiosaurus baby, Triceratops baby/Triceratops, Spinosaurus, Diplodocus | March 10, 2016 | February 17, 2011 |
| 22 | 9 | "Roaring Good Time" | Brachiosaurus baby, Triceratops baby/Triceratops, Spinosaurus, Diplodocus | March 10, 2016 | February 17, 2011 |
"Hard Hat, Long Neck": Dan's Uncle Jack takes him, Jordan, and Kami on a trip to the beach, but Uncle Jack's sand castle keeps getting wrecked by baby dinosaurs. They soon find out how similar dinosaurs are to construction vehicles. "Roaring Good Time": While trying to get a Triceratops snort on tape, Dan finds out several differences in the sounds made by dinosaurs.
| 23 | 10 | "Mini Dino" | Compsognathus, Dromaeosaurus, Pterodactylus/Diplodocus | April 25, 2016 | February 22, 2011 |
| 23 | 10 | "Three Little Paleontologists" | Compsognathus, Dromaeosaurus, Pterodactylus/Diplodocus | April 25, 2016 | February 22, 2011 |
"Mini Dino": At a mini golf course with Cory and his father, Dan finds his dinosaur egg-themed golf ball under constant theft from several dinosaurs. "Three Little Paleontologists": While trying to figure out what materials to make a fort with, Dan tells a story about the three little pigs, only this time, it stars Kami, Jordan, and Angie as three paleontologists attempting to build forts to let them pet a Diplodocus.
| 24 | 11 | "Dino Strike" | Stygimoloch, Compsognathus/Spinosaurus, Tyrannosaurus rex | April 4, 2015 | February 24, 2011 |
| 24 | 11 | "Nothing but the Tooth" | Stygimoloch, Compsognathus/Spinosaurus, Tyrannosaurus rex | April 4, 2015 | February 24, 2011 |
"Dino Strike": While at a bowling alley with Trek and his Uncle Jack, Dan finds himself protecting Stygimoloch eggs from a hungry Compsognathus. "Nothing but the Tooth": Dan's grandmother takes him with her on the way to the veterinarian's office for her dog's checkup, allowing him to find out if a tooth he found belonged to either a Spinosaurus or T-rex.
| 25 | 12 | "Down on the Farm" | Compsognathus, Stygimoloch, Edmontosaurus,/Tyrannosaurus rex, Compsognathus, Brachiosaurus, Diplodocus, Euoplocephalus, Edmontosaurus, Corythosaurus | March 29, 2014 | March 2, 2011 |
| 25 | 12 | "Time Traveller's Dino" | Compsognathus, Stygimoloch, Edmontosaurus,/Tyrannosaurus rex, Compsognathus, Brachiosaurus, Diplodocus, Euoplocephalus, Edmontosaurus, Corythosaurus | March 29, 2014 | March 2, 2011 |
"Down on the Farm": The Hendersons go on a shopping trip at a farmer's market, and Dan is convinced that some down he found belongs to a Compsognathus. "Time Traveller's Dino": While trying to take a picture of a T-rex, Dan encounters Cory and his father making a time machine, enveloping the entire group in a chronological adventure through the entire Mesozoic.
| 26 | 13 | Where the Dinosaurs Are | Dromaeosaurus, Stygimoloch, Pterodactylus, Compsognathus, Tyrannosaurus rex, Corythosaurus, Quetzalcoatlus, Edmontosaurus, Euoplocephalus, Brachiosaurus, Diplodocus, Stegosaurus, Triceratops, Spinosaurus | March 8, 2014 | March 8, 2011 |
On Barnum Brown day, Dan gets to take care of a T-rex claw fossil while on a sleepover at the Royal Ontario Museum, and find out why the T-rex had short arms. Unfortunately, the claw is stolen by wily dinosaurs in the process, and Dan must get it back before the museum opens in the morning!

=== Season 3 (Dino Dan: Trek's Adventures) ===
| No. overall | No. in season | Segments | Dinosaurs | Trek's Digital Field Guide (Nick Jr.) | American Premiere (Nick Jr.) | Canadian Premiere (TVO Kids) |
|---|---|---|---|---|---|---|
| 27 | 1 | "Team Dino" | Albertosaurus/Troodon, Amargasaurus, Giganotosaurus, Triceratops | Dracorex | March 1, 2014 | September 5, 2013 |
| 27 | 1 | "Use Your Dino Senses" | Albertosaurus/Troodon, Amargasaurus, Giganotosaurus, Triceratops | Dracorex | March 1, 2014 | September 5, 2013 |
"Team Dino": Dan is at Drumheller, Alberta, at the Royal Tyrell Museum, so he sends Trek his dino gear and an upgraded field guide, Trek finds himself able to see dinosaurs like his brother did, and sets off to continue Dan's latest experiment with an Albertosaurus. "Use Your Dino Senses": Trek's class is having a scavenger hunt involving the five senses, and he plans on winning with the help of the dinosaurs.
| 28 | 2 | "Dinobusters" | Microraptor, Pterodaustro, Troodon, Dromaeosaurus, Dracorex, Stygimoloch | TBA | September 21, 2013 | September 4, 2013 |
"Dinobusters": Trek tells a spooky story when his friends come over for a movie night, starring himself, as well as Hannah and Bobby as a spoof of the Ghostbusters solving a case at a mansion (owned by a noblewoman played by his mother) infested with dinosaurs (snuck in by Penelope, who is the building's maid).
| 29 | 3 | "Dino Survivor School" | Tyrannosaurus rex baby, Kosmoceratops, Triceratops, Pterodactylus, Compsognathus, Tyrannosaurus rex/Tyrannosaurus rex, Brachiosaurus, Kosmoceratops, Pterodactylus, Albertosaurus, Saurolophus, Seismosaurus, Gigantoraptor, Kryptops, Gallimimus, Cronopio, Quetzalcoatlus | Therizinosarus | March 15, 2014 | December 1, 2013 |
| 29 | 3 | "Tyrannosaurus Trek" | Tyrannosaurus rex baby, Kosmoceratops, Triceratops, Pterodactylus, Compsognathus, Tyrannosaurus rex/Tyrannosaurus rex, Brachiosaurus, Kosmoceratops, Pterodactylus, Albertosaurus, Saurolophus, Seismosaurus, Gigantoraptor, Kryptops, Gallimimus, Cronopio, Quetzalcoatlus | Therizinosarus | March 15, 2014 | December 1, 2013 |
"Dino Survivor School": Bobby gifts the Hendersons a dog treat dispenser for Doug, and sets to work with Mrs. Henderson to train the pug on using it. Trek, meanwhile, busies himself with teaching a baby T-rex how to hunt, dodge and scavenge. "Tyrannosaurus Trek": With the help of his grandmother, Trek imagines himself as a comic book superhero saving the dinosaurs from a heavy erupting volcano.
| 30 | 4 | "Trek Rex" | Therizinosaurus, Dracorex, Amargasaurus, Microraptor, Troodon, Albertosaurus, Giganotosaurus/Dracorex, Pterodactylus, Microraptor, Albertosaurus | Kosmoceratops | September 28, 2015 | September 3, 2013 |
| 30 | 4 | "Dino Climbers" | Therizinosaurus, Dracorex, Amargasaurus, Microraptor, Troodon, Albertosaurus, Giganotosaurus/Dracorex, Pterodactylus, Microraptor, Albertosaurus | Kosmoceratops | September 28, 2015 | September 3, 2013 |
"Trek Rex": On Trek's birthday costume party, he has to choose which dinosaur to make his new costume. "Dino Climbers": While at a climbing gym with his mother and Bobby, Trek tests to see which dinosaur is the best climber.
| 31 | 5 | "Brainy Dino" | Dromaeosaurus, Troodon/Troodon, Tyrannosaurus rex, Amargasaurus, Microraptor, Euoplocephalus | Albertosaurus | September 30, 2015 | September 10, 2013 |
| 31 | 5 | "Trekoodon" | Dromaeosaurus, Troodon/Troodon, Tyrannosaurus rex, Amargasaurus, Microraptor, Euoplocephalus | Albertosaurus | September 30, 2015 | September 10, 2013 |
"Brainy Dino": Trek decides to figure out who is the smarter dinosaur, the Dromaeosaurus or the Troodon. "Trekoodon": Trek imagines himself as a Troodon to best describe its supreme abilities.
| 32 | 6 | "Dino BBQ" | Microraptor, Giganotosaurus, Spinosaurus baby, Pterodactylus, Dracorex, Diplodocus/Albertosaurus, Psittacosaurus | Troodon | March 7, 2016 | September 11, 2013 |
| 32 | 6 | "Show and Dino" | Microraptor, Giganotosaurus, Spinosaurus baby, Pterodactylus, Dracorex, Diplodocus/Albertosaurus, Psittacosaurus | Troodon | March 7, 2016 | September 11, 2013 |
"Dino BBQ": Trek's grandmother decides to have a barbeque dinner night. Unfortunately, Trek hid dino bait all over the backyard, and they think the burgers meant for his dinner is more bait. "Show and Dino": Trek's class is having a show and tell, but he forgot to bring something. Deciding a Psittacosaurus quill would be an ideal item, he sets off on quest to get one.
| 33 | 7 | "Micro Dino" | Microraptor/Tuatara, Tyrannosaurus rex | Amargasaurus | November 21, 2014 | September 26, 2013 |
| 33 | 7 | "Meteorite Survivors" | Microraptor/Tuatara, Tyrannosaurus rex | Amargasaurus | November 21, 2014 | September 26, 2013 |
"Micro Dino": Trek sets out to find out what the Microraptor eats, but his mother is cleaning the house, and his traps keep getting set off by anyone but the intended catch. "Meteorite Survivors": Bobby's father takes the friends out to see a meteor shower, and the friends are soon learning how all sorts of prehistoric creatures have managed to survive the meteorite crash that wiped out the dinosaurs.
| 34 | 8 | "Flight of the Pterodaustro" | Pterodaustro, Giganotosaurus/Psittacosaurus, Stygimoloch, Therizinosaurus | Psittacosaurus | March 22, 2014 | September 12, 2013 |
| 34 | 8 | "Trekules" | Pterodaustro, Giganotosaurus/Psittacosaurus, Stygimoloch, Therizinosaurus | Psittacosaurus | March 22, 2014 | September 12, 2013 |
"Flight of the Pterodaustro": While flying model helicopters with Hannah and her father, Trek sets out to learn all there is about the Pterodaustro. "Trekules": Trek tells the tale of Trekules, a version of himself crossed with the ancient Greek mythological figure Hercules, who fought off against dinosaurs after gaining the proper knowledge.
| 35 | 9 | "Pterosaur Picnic" | Pterodactylus, Pterodaustro, Quetzalcoatlus, Troodon, Spinosaurus/Troodon, Corythosaurus, Deinosuchus, Giganotosaurus | TBA | March 8, 2016 | September 17, 2013 |
| 35 | 9 | "Sabre Tooth Doug" | Pterodactylus, Pterodaustro, Quetzalcoatlus, Troodon, Spinosaurus/Troodon, Corythosaurus, Deinosuchus, Giganotosaurus | TBA | March 8, 2016 | September 17, 2013 |
"Pterosaur Picnic": On a picnic with Penelope and her older brother Liam, Trek runs into Jordan, an old best friend of his brother Dan. Pretty soon, they set off helping Trek find out how different Pterosaurs made their nests. "Sabre Tooth Doug": To help Hannah understand how prehistoric mammals survived against dinosaurs, Trek pits Doug in a series of scenarios to give her a better picture of their lives.
| 36 | 10 | "Dino Talk" | Dromaeosaurus, Albertosaurus/Therizinosaurus, Tyrannosaurus rex | TBA | March 9, 2016 | September 18, 2013 |
| 36 | 10 | "Paws and Claws" | Dromaeosaurus, Albertosaurus/Therizinosaurus, Tyrannosaurus rex | TBA | March 9, 2016 | September 18, 2013 |
"Dino Talk": Trek tries using a Dromaeosaurus cast to get a Dromaeosaurus to knock multitude of objects down from the roof of their garage, and Penelope's knowledge of different bird calls is potentially his key to success. "Paws and Claws": Doug starts hiding multiple things around the Henderson household, and while Hannah and his mother pry for clues inside the house, Trek finds out how a Therizinosaurus uses its claws while looking through his backyard for clues.
| 37 | 11 | "Cowboys vs. Dinosaurs" | Therizinosaurus/Dracorex, Corythosaurus, Euoplocephalus, Brachiosaurus, Tyrannosaurus rex, Pterodactylus | Microraptor | March 29, 2014 | November 2, 2013 |
| 37 | 11 | "Survival of the Biggest" | Therizinosaurus/Dracorex, Corythosaurus, Euoplocephalus, Brachiosaurus, Tyrannosaurus rex, Pterodactylus | Microraptor | March 29, 2014 | November 2, 2013 |
"Cowboys vs. Dinosaurs": Trek tells the story of a Wild West deputy who has to contend with a wanted Therizinosaurus. "Survival of the Biggest": Penelope's cold forces her to stay inside on the day Trek asks her to help research dinosaurs, but with her help, Trek learns why so many different dinosaurs stick together in a large mixed herd.
| 38 | 12 | "Train of Dinos" | Brachiosaurus, Tyrannosaurus rex, Euoplocephalus/Edmontosaurus, Triceratops, Giganotosaurus, Edmontosaurus baby, Triceratops babies. | Plesiosaur | November 19, 2014 | October 22, 2013 |
| 38 | 12 | "Switched at Nest" | Brachiosaurus, Tyrannosaurus rex, Euoplocephalus/Edmontosaurus, Triceratops, Giganotosaurus, Edmontosaurus baby, Triceratops babies. | Plesiosaur | November 19, 2014 | October 22, 2013 |
"Train of Dinos": While her father is on a call, Hannah listens to Trek's introductory story about how dinosaurs came to her father's model train set. "Switched at Nest": Trek witnesses an Edmontosaurus lay an egg in a Triceratops nest, and with the help of his friends, he learns about the behavior of brood parasites.
| 39 | 13 | "Officer Trek" | Dromaeosaurus, Archelon, Plesiosaurus, Spinosaurus, Spinosaurus baby/Psittacosaurus, Troodon | Dracorex | March 8, 2014 | November 16, 2013 |
| 39 | 13 | "Dino Rocks" | Dromaeosaurus, Archelon, Plesiosaurus, Spinosaurus, Spinosaurus baby/Psittacosaurus, Troodon | Dracorex | March 8, 2014 | November 16, 2013 |
"Officer Trek": Trek dreams about being a police officer along with his mother, solving the mystery of which prehistoric creature ate a fisherman's fresh catch. "Dino Rocks": After a Psittacosaurus swallows a few rocks from his rock collection, Trek sets out to discover why it swallows rocks, with the help of his grandmother and Penelope.

=== Season 4 (Dino Dan: Trek's Adventures) ===
| No. overall | No. in season | Segments | Dinosaurs | American Premiere (Nick Jr.) | Canadian Premiere (TVO Kids) |
|---|---|---|---|---|---|
| 40 | 1 | "Tracker Trek" | Dracorex, Triceratops, Kosmoceratops, Pterodaustro, Tyrannosaurus rex/Spinosaurus baby, Archelon, Plesiosaurus, Spinosaurus | April 10, 2016 | July 24, 2014 |
| 40 | 1 | "Teach a Spino to Fish" | Dracorex, Triceratops, Kosmoceratops, Pterodaustro, Tyrannosaurus rex/Spinosaurus baby, Archelon, Plesiosaurus, Spinosaurus | April 10, 2016 | July 24, 2014 |
"Tracker Trek": When Trek, Penelope, and her mother wake up, their campsite is destroyed, and the three set off to discover the culprit of the chaos. "Teach a Spino to Fish": While Trek and his grandmother are going fishing, he tries to teach a baby Spinosaurus how to fish by watching how other fish-eaters fish.
| 41 | 2 | "Flashy Dinos" | Amargasaurus/Tyrannosaurus rex baby, Brachiosaurus baby, Spinosaurus baby, Tyrannosaurus rex, Brachiosaurus, Spinosaurus | April 25, 2016 | June 4, 2015 |
| 41 | 2 | "Adventures in Dino-Sitting" | Amargasaurus/Tyrannosaurus rex baby, Brachiosaurus baby, Spinosaurus baby, Tyrannosaurus rex, Brachiosaurus, Spinosaurus | April 25, 2016 | June 4, 2015 |
"Flashy Dinos": While celebrating Friendship Day at school, Trek sees an Amargasaurus flash its sail and wonders why it does it. "Adventures in Dino-Sitting": While Liam babysits Trek, some baby dinosaurs are making a mess around Trek's house, and Trek has to lure them out without them causing more havoc.
| 42 | 3 | "Beach Blanket Deino" | Deinosuchus, Corythosaurus/Dromaeosaurus, Troodon, Microraptor, Pterodactylus | April 27, 2016 | August 30, 2014 |
| 42 | 3 | "Robot and Dinos" | Deinosuchus, Corythosaurus/Dromaeosaurus, Troodon, Microraptor, Pterodactylus | April 27, 2016 | August 30, 2014 |
"Beach Blanket Deino": During a trip to the beach with his mother and grandmother, Trek sets out to discover the hunting style of the Deinosuchus. "Robot and Dinos": Trek discovers a Dromaeosaurus mother and her egg while visiting a robotics laboratory Bobby's father works at with Bobby, and he subsequently must use every robot the facility has to help keep the egg safe from smaller thieving dinos.
| 43 | 4 | "Night Vision Dino" | Kosmoceratops, Stygimoloch, Dromaeosaurus/Microraptor | September 26, 2016 | September 6, 2014 |
| 43 | 4 | "Dino Glider" | Kosmoceratops, Stygimoloch, Dromaeosaurus/Microraptor | September 26, 2016 | September 6, 2014 |
"Night Vision Dino": Trek goes to the Caparez family's house for a sleepover, but ends up helping Bobby and his father find a nocturnal animal who's been stealing vegetables from their garden patch. "Dino Glider": While circus training with Hannah and her father, Trek discovers a Microraptor and with their help sets out to discover if the creature can fly.
| 44 | 5 | "Dino-Go-Seek" | Microraptor, Dromaeosaurus/Tyrannosaurus rex, Giganotosaurus, Edmontosaurus, Futalognkosaurus | September 28, 2016 | January 1, 2014 |
| 44 | 5 | "Dino Giants" | Microraptor, Dromaeosaurus/Tyrannosaurus rex, Giganotosaurus, Edmontosaurus, Futalognkosaurus | September 28, 2016 | January 1, 2014 |
"Dino-Go-Seek": While playing a game of hide-and-go-seek with his grandmother and his friends, Trek finds a Microraptor hiding in his house and uses the knowledge of its tactics to find the others. "Dino Giants": Trek and his mother head off to a dinosaur museum so the former can figure out who would win a fight if a T. Rex were to face off against a Giganotosaurus.
| 45 | 6 | "Dino Pals" | Ozraptor/Triceratops baby, Triceratops, Brachiosaurus, Brachiosaurus baby, Edmontosaurus baby, Edmontosaurus | TBA | October 9, 2014 |
| 45 | 6 | "Dino Mommas" | Ozraptor/Triceratops baby, Triceratops, Brachiosaurus, Brachiosaurus baby, Edmontosaurus baby, Edmontosaurus | TBA | October 9, 2014 |
"Dino Pals": Trek makes fast friends with a visiting student and fellow dinosaur enthusiast from Australia, and sets off with him to find a fossil stolen during his presentation. "Dino Mommas": Forgetting about Mothers' Day until the day is already in motion, Trek sets off to gather supplies so Penelope can help him make a last-minute present, all while helping a baby Triceratops find its mother.
| 46 | 7 | "Dino Tooth Fairy" | Tyrannosaurus rex baby, Plesiosaurus baby, Edmontosaurus baby/Tyrannosaurus rex baby, Plesiosaurus baby, Brachiosaurus baby, Tyrannosaurus rex, Plesiosaurus, Brachiosaurus, Triceratops Baby, Spinosaurus baby, Edmontosaurus baby, Pterodactylus | March 6, 2017 | October 14, 2014 |
| 46 | 7 | "Dino Pet Store" | Tyrannosaurus rex baby, Plesiosaurus baby, Edmontosaurus baby/Tyrannosaurus rex baby, Plesiosaurus baby, Brachiosaurus baby, Tyrannosaurus rex, Plesiosaurus, Brachiosaurus, Triceratops Baby, Spinosaurus baby, Edmontosaurus baby, Pterodactylus | March 6, 2017 | October 14, 2014 |
"Dino Tooth Fairy": While waiting for his last baby tooth to fall out, Trek finds a loose dinosaur tooth and sets off to return it so that the baby dinosaur can receive a visit from the tooth fairy. "Dino Pet Store": A visit to Penelope's house and seeing her many pets leads to Trek telling stories of why a baby dinosaur is far from an ideal pet.
| 47 | 8 | "Dino Sightseeing" | Spinosaurus baby, Plesiosaurus, Deinosuchus, Spinosaurus/Quetzalcoatlus, Tyrannosaurus rex, Darwinopterus, Phosphatodraco, Tupandactylus | March 7, 2017 | October 16, 2014 |
| 47 | 8 | "Quetza Grandma" | Spinosaurus baby, Plesiosaurus, Deinosuchus, Spinosaurus/Quetzalcoatlus, Tyrannosaurus rex, Darwinopterus, Phosphatodraco, Tupandactylus | March 7, 2017 | October 16, 2014 |
"Dino Sightseeing": Trek finds a baby Spinosaurus while visiting Niagara Falls with his grandmother, and learns a lot about aquatic dinosaurs as he helps the baby find its mother during the tour. "Quetza Grandma": Before she leaves for the airport before the winter, Trek and his grandmother write a comic book starring their superhero alter egos helping out a pterosaur migration.
| 48 | 9 | "Carnivore Contest" | Giganotosaurus, Microraptor, Troodon/Dromaeosaurus, Dracorex, Kosmoceratops, Troodon | March 8, 2017 | August 11, 2015 |
| 48 | 9 | "Dino Racers" | Giganotosaurus, Microraptor, Troodon/Dromaeosaurus, Dracorex, Kosmoceratops, Troodon | March 8, 2017 | August 11, 2015 |
"Carnivore Contest": While Penelope and her mother try to find a Harris' Hawk, Trek cycles around the park to discover the hunting methods of certain carnivores. "Dino Racers": While spending time with his friends at an indoor go-kart venue, Trek tells his friends the reason why certain dinosaurs could beat a go-kart in a race.
| 49 | 10 | "Everyone Loves Marine Reptiles" | Archelon, Deinosuchus, Plesiosaurus, Plesiosaurus baby/Dromaeosaurus, Microraptor, Velociraptor, Utahraptor | March 9, 2017 | October 23, 2014 |
| 49 | 10 | "Dino Clash" | Archelon, Deinosuchus, Plesiosaurus, Plesiosaurus baby/Dromaeosaurus, Microraptor, Velociraptor, Utahraptor | March 9, 2017 | October 23, 2014 |
"Everyone Loves Marine Reptiles": A visit to a marine park with his mother and Penelope leads Trek to imagine a variant with prehistoric marine reptiles as he tells about them to the other two. "Dino Clash": While playing video games with Bobby, Trek convinces him to try a new one using the strategies of the Dromeosaurids.
| 50 | 11 | "Dino Footprints" | Pterodactylus, Dracorex, Dromaeosaurus/Dracorex, Compsognathus, Dromaeosaurus, Albertosaurus | April 4, 2015 | January 13, 2015 |
| 50 | 11 | "Dino Egg Hunt" | Pterodactylus, Dracorex, Dromaeosaurus/Dracorex, Compsognathus, Dromaeosaurus, Albertosaurus | April 4, 2015 | January 13, 2015 |
"Dino Footprints": After joining Hannah and her father's after-school club, Trek sets out to gather the footprints of the dinosaurs he sees around the school. "Dino Egg Hunt": Trek discovers a dinosaur gathering around a Dracorex nest, and is inspired to use the day's egg hunt to see which of the dinosaurs he saw primarily feeds on eggs.
| 51 | 12 | "Swimming with Plesiosaurs" | Plesiosaurus, Plesiosaurus baby, Spinosaurus/Dracorex, Tyrannosaurus rex, Troodon, Microraptor, Dromaeosaurus, Spinosaurus, Albertosaurus, Giganotosaurus, Euoplocephalus, Triceratops, Therizinosaurus, Corythosaurus, Brachiosaurus, Amargasaurus, Diplodocus, Stygimoloch, Pterodaustro, Quetzalcoatlus, Archelon, Deinosuchus | March 6, 2017 | October 15, 2015 |
| 51 | 12 | "Dino Trek the Musical" | Plesiosaurus, Plesiosaurus baby, Spinosaurus/Dracorex, Tyrannosaurus rex, Troodon, Microraptor, Dromaeosaurus, Spinosaurus, Albertosaurus, Giganotosaurus, Euoplocephalus, Triceratops, Therizinosaurus, Corythosaurus, Brachiosaurus, Amargasaurus, Diplodocus, Stygimoloch, Pterodaustro, Quetzalcoatlus, Archelon, Deinosuchus | March 6, 2017 | October 15, 2015 |
"Swimming with Plesiosaurs": Trek finds a baby Plesiosaur while at the community pool with his grandmother and sets out to teach it to swim while helping find its mother. "Dino Trek the Musical": On the day of a large musical stage performance, Trek helps Penelope deal with her stage fright by telling her to imagine the audience as dinosaurs.
| 52 | 13 | "The Wonderful Wizard of Dinoz" | Microraptor, Stegosaurus, Troodon, Albertosaurus, Pterodactylus, Brachiosaurus, Triceratops, Tyrannosaurus rex | November 17, 2014 | November 14, 2014 |
On the night before he and his mother fly off to Alberta to see their family, Trek dreams about going on a dino version of the story of The Wizard of Oz.

=== Season 5 (Dino Dana) ===
| No. overall | No. in season | Segments | Dinosaurs | American Premiere (Amazon Prime Video) | Canadian Premiere (TVO Kids) |
|---|---|---|---|---|---|
| 53 | 1 | "Dino Field Guides" | Troodon, Ozraptor, Tyrannosaurus rex, Troodon baby, Brachiosaurus, Corythosaurus | May 25, 2017 | May 24, 2016 |
Trek gives the same dino field guide he and his brother Dan use to do to a girl named Dana and like the former two, the latter loves Dinosaurs and now she can see them and does experiments with them.
| 54 | 2 | "Dino Divers" | Deinosuchus, Spinosaurus, Spinosaurus baby, Pterodactylus, Tyrannosaurus rex/Microraptor | May 25, 2017 | June 3, 2017 |
| 54 | 2 | "A Game of Microraptor and Mouse" | Deinosuchus, Spinosaurus, Spinosaurus baby, Pterodactylus, Tyrannosaurus rex/Microraptor | May 25, 2017 | June 3, 2017 |
| 55 | 3 | "All In The Dino Family" | Stegosaurus, Kentrosaurus/Titanoboa, Tyrannosaurus rex | May 25, 2017 | June 10, 2017 |
| 55 | 3 | "Snakes and Dinosaurs" | Stegosaurus, Kentrosaurus/Titanoboa, Tyrannosaurus rex | May 25, 2017 | June 10, 2017 |
| 56 | 4 | "Dinos of a Feather" | Incisivosaurus, Dromaeosaurus/Spinosaurus, Troodon, Spinosaurus babies | May 25, 2017 | June 17, 2017 |
| 56 | 4 | "Dino Baby Talk" | Incisivosaurus, Dromaeosaurus/Spinosaurus, Troodon, Spinosaurus babies | May 25, 2017 | June 17, 2017 |
"Dinos of a Feather": After being excluded from spending time with Saara, Dana discovers how the incisivosaurus made friends.
| 57 | 5 | "Dino Doctor" | Kentrosaurus, Albertosaurus, Dromaeosaurus/Maiasaura, Tyrannosaurus rex | May 25, 2017 | June 24, 2017 |
| 57 | 5 | "Be My Dino Baby" | Kentrosaurus, Albertosaurus, Dromaeosaurus/Maiasaura, Tyrannosaurus rex | May 25, 2017 | June 24, 2017 |
| 58 | 6 | "Dino Defender" | Dromaeosaurus, Pterodaustro, Sinornithosaurus/Futalognkosaurus, Psittacosaurus, Kosmoceratops | May 25, 2017 | June 1, 2017 |
| 58 | 6 | "Dino Days of Summer" | Dromaeosaurus, Pterodaustro, Sinornithosaurus/Futalognkosaurus, Psittacosaurus, Kosmoceratops | May 25, 2017 | June 1, 2017 |
| 59 | 7 | "Calling All Plesiosaurs" | Plesiosaurus baby, Deinosuchus, Spinosaurus, Plesiosaurus/Tyrannosaurus rex | May 25, 2017 | July 8, 2017 |
| 59 | 7 | "King of the Dance Floor" | Plesiosaurus baby, Deinosuchus, Spinosaurus, Plesiosaurus/Tyrannosaurus rex | May 25, 2017 | July 8, 2017 |
| 60 | 8 | "Fossil Finders" | Spinosaurus, Plesiosaurus, Archelon/Triceratops baby, Tyrannosaurus rex, Triceratops | May 25, 2017 | July 15, 2017 |
| 60 | 8 | "Dino Rescue Train" | Spinosaurus, Plesiosaurus, Archelon/Triceratops baby, Tyrannosaurus rex, Triceratops | May 25, 2017 | July 15, 2017 |
| 61 | 9 | "Mega Tooth" | Megalodon/Microraptor, Ozraptor | May 25, 2017 | July 22, 2017 |
| 61 | 9 | "Dino Dodgeball" | Megalodon/Microraptor, Ozraptor | May 25, 2017 | July 22, 2017 |
| 62 | 10 | "Get That Incisivosaurus!" | Incisivosaurus/Nanuqsaurus, Tyrannosaurus rex, Titanoboa, Compsognathus | May 25, 2017 | July 29, 2017 |
| 62 | 10 | "Dino Sight" | Incisivosaurus/Nanuqsaurus, Tyrannosaurus rex, Titanoboa, Compsognathus | May 25, 2017 | July 29, 2017 |
| 63 | 11 | "I Dig History" | Quetzalcoatlus, Tyrannosaurus rex, Triceratops/Tyrannosaurus rex, Corythosaurus, Compsognathus | May 25, 2017 | August 5, 2017 |
| 63 | 11 | "Dinomite" | Quetzalcoatlus, Tyrannosaurus rex, Triceratops/Tyrannosaurus rex, Corythosaurus, Compsognathus | May 25, 2017 | August 5, 2017 |
| 64 | 12 | "Face Your Fearosaurus" | Brachiosaurus, Giganotosaurus, Kentrosaurus/Edmontosaurus, Edmontosaurus baby, Giganotosaurus | May 25, 2017 | August 12, 2017 |
| 64 | 12 | "Herd it Loud and Clear" | Brachiosaurus, Giganotosaurus, Kentrosaurus/Edmontosaurus, Edmontosaurus baby, Giganotosaurus | May 25, 2017 | August 12, 2017 |
| 65 | 13 | "Dino Matchmaker" | Sinornithosaurus/Troodon, Diabloceratops | May 25, 2017 | August 19, 2017 |
| 65 | 13 | "Lost and Sound" | Sinornithosaurus/Troodon, Diabloceratops | May 25, 2017 | August 19, 2017 |

=== Season 6 (Dino Dana) ===
| No. overall | No. in season | Segments | Story by | Teleplay by | American Premiere (Amazon Prime Video) | Canadian Premiere (TVO Kids) | Dinosaurs |
|---|---|---|---|---|---|---|---|
| 66 | 1 | "Tusk Love" | J.J. Johnson & Christin Simms & Curtis Hsiung | J.J. Johnson & Christin Simms & Curtis Hsiung | May 24, 2018 | March 19, 2018 | Triceratops, Triceratops babies, Ozraptor, Albertosaurus, Albertosaurus baby, Woolly mammoth |
| 66 | 1 | "Tusk Love" | J.J. Johnson & Christin Simms & Curtis Hsiung | J.J. Johnson & Christin Simms & Curtis Hsiung | May 24, 2018 | March 20, 2018 | Triceratops, Triceratops babies, Ozraptor, Albertosaurus, Albertosaurus baby, Woolly mammoth |
| 67 | 2 | "Dino Rivalry" | J.J. Johnson & Christin Simms & Jagjiwan Sohal | Jagjiwan Sohal / J.J. Johnson & Christin Simms & Courtney Goldman | May 24, 2018 | March 22, 2018 | Psittacosaurus, Dracorex, Therizinosaurus/Compsognathus, Stegosaurus, Dromaeosaurus |
| 67 | 2 | "Dino Skater" | J.J. Johnson & Christin Simms & Jagjiwan Sohal | Jagjiwan Sohal / J.J. Johnson & Christin Simms & Courtney Goldman | May 24, 2018 | March 21, 2018 | Psittacosaurus, Dracorex, Therizinosaurus/Compsognathus, Stegosaurus, Dromaeosaurus |
| 68 | 3 | "Dino In Aisle 7" | J.J. Johnson & Christin Simms & Kara Harun | Kara Harun | May 24, 2018 | March 23, 2018 | Stygimoloch/Euoplocephalus, Albertosaurus, Dromaeosaurus, Microraptor |
| 68 | 3 | "Dino Suit of Armour" | J.J. Johnson & Christin Simms & Kara Harun | Kara Harun | May 24, 2018 | March 26, 2018 | Stygimoloch/Euoplocephalus, Albertosaurus, Dromaeosaurus, Microraptor |
| 69 | 4 | "Taming the Smilodon" | J.J. Johnson & Christin Simms & Christopher Coey | Christopher Coey / J.J. Johnson & Christin Simms | May 24, 2018 | June 25, 2018 | Smilodon, Woolly mammoth/Psittacosaurus, Dromaeosaurus |
| 69 | 4 | "DIY Dino" | J.J. Johnson & Christin Simms & Christopher Coey | Christopher Coey / J.J. Johnson & Christin Simms | May 24, 2018 | March 28, 2018 | Smilodon, Woolly mammoth/Psittacosaurus, Dromaeosaurus |
| 70 | 5 | "A Dino Never Forgets" | J.J. Johnson & Christin Simms & Nathalie Younglai | Nathalie Younglai | May 24, 2018 | April 2, 2018 | Brachiosaurus, Brachiosaurus babies, Diplodocus, Amargasaurus, Futalognkosaurus/Compsognathus, Therizinosaurus, Dromaeosaurus |
| 70 | 5 | "Claw & Order" | J.J. Johnson & Christin Simms & Nathalie Younglai | Nathalie Younglai | May 24, 2018 | April 04, 2018 | Brachiosaurus, Brachiosaurus babies, Diplodocus, Amargasaurus, Futalognkosaurus/Compsognathus, Therizinosaurus, Dromaeosaurus |
| 71 | 6 | "Reptile Connection" | J.J. Johnson & Christin Simms | Christin Simms | May 24, 2018 | April 6, 2018 | Archelon, Deinosuchus, Titanoboa/Edmontosaurus, Edmontosaurus baby, Albertosaurus |
| 71 | 6 | "Three Dinos and a Baby" | J.J. Johnson & Christin Simms | Christin Simms | May 24, 2018 | March 22, 2018 | Archelon, Deinosuchus, Titanoboa/Edmontosaurus, Edmontosaurus baby, Albertosaurus |
| 72 | 7 | "Dinoback Riding" | J.J. Johnson & Christin Simms & Jamie Naylor | J.J. Johnson & Christin Simms & Jamie Naylor | May 24, 2018 | April 11, 2018 | Hippodraco/Sinornithosaurus |
| 72 | 7 | "Overnight Dino" | J.J. Johnson & Christin Simms & Jamie Naylor | J.J. Johnson & Christin Simms & Jamie Naylor | May 24, 2018 | April 13, 2018 | Hippodraco/Sinornithosaurus |
| 73 | 8 | "Saaratops" | J.J. Johnson & Christin Simms & Stephanie Dacosta | Stephanie Dacosta | May 24, 2018 | June 27, 2018 | Microraptor, Triceratops, Kosmoceratops, Diabloceratops/Triceratops Baby, Brachiosaurus Baby, Tyrannosaurus rex, Tyrannosaurus rex Baby, Dromaeosaurus |
| 73 | 8 | "Raising Dino Expectations" | J.J. Johnson & Christin Simms & Stephanie Dacosta | Stephanie Dacosta | May 24, 2018 | March 30, 2018 | Microraptor, Triceratops, Kosmoceratops, Diabloceratops/Triceratops Baby, Brachiosaurus Baby, Tyrannosaurus rex, Tyrannosaurus rex Baby, Dromaeosaurus |
| 74 | 9 | "The Fast and The Fiercest" | J.J. Johnson & Christin Simms & Jagjiwan Sohal | Jagjiwan Sohal / J.J. Johnson & Christin Simms & Jadiel Dowlin | May 24, 2018 | June 29, 2018 | Stygimoloch, Albertosaurus/Brachiosaurus Baby, Troodon, Brachiosaurus, Tyrannosaurus rex |
| 74 | 9 | "Growing Up Dino" | J.J. Johnson & Christin Simms & Jagjiwan Sohal | Jagjiwan Sohal / J.J. Johnson & Christin Simms & Jadiel Dowlin | May 24, 2018 | July 04, 2018 | Stygimoloch, Albertosaurus/Brachiosaurus Baby, Troodon, Brachiosaurus, Tyrannosaurus rex |
| 75 | 10 | "Dino Thieves" | J.J. Johnson & Christin Simms & Desmond Sargent | J.J. Johnson & Christin Simms | May 24, 2018 | July 6, 2018 | Ozraptor/Dromaeosaurus, Compsognathus |
| 75 | 10 | "The Dino Giver" | J.J. Johnson & Christin Simms & Desmond Sargent | J.J. Johnson & Christin Simms | May 24, 2018 | July 09, 2018 | Ozraptor/Dromaeosaurus, Compsognathus |
| 76 | 11 | "The First Elephant" | J.J. Johnson | J.J. Johnson & Christin Simms | May 24, 2018 | July 11, 2018 | Woolly Mammoth, Smilodon/Troodon, Troodon Baby, Nanuqsaurus |
| 76 | 11 | "Dino Burrow" | J.J. Johnson | J.J. Johnson & Christin Simms | May 24, 2018 | July 13, 2018 | Woolly Mammoth, Smilodon/Troodon, Troodon Baby, Nanuqsaurus |
| 77 | 12 | "Dino Kitty" | J.J. Johnson & Christin Simms & Jay Vaidya | Jay Vaidya | May 24, 2018 | July 16, 2018 | Smilodon/Troodon, Ugrunaaluk |
| 77 | 12 | "Dino, It's Cold Outside" | J.J. Johnson & Christin Simms & Jay Vaidya | Jay Vaidya | May 24, 2018 | July 18, 2018 | Smilodon/Troodon, Ugrunaaluk |
| 78 | 13 | "Game of Bones" | J.J. Johnson & Christin Simms & Jay Vaidya | J.J. Johnson & Christin Simms & Jay Vaidya | May 24, 2018 | July 23, 2018 | Tyrannosaurus rex, Deinosuchus, Microraptor, Giganotosaurus, Troodon |
| 78 | 13 | "Game of Bones" | J.J. Johnson & Christin Simms & Jay Vaidya | J.J. Johnson & Christin Simms & Jay Vaidya | May 24, 2018 | July 25, 2018 | Tyrannosaurus rex, Deinosuchus, Microraptor, Giganotosaurus, Troodon |

=== Season 7 (Dino Dana) ===
| No. overall | No. in season | Segments | American Premiere (Amazon Prime Video) | Canadian Premiere (TVO Kids) | Dinosaurs |
|---|---|---|---|---|---|
| 79 | 1 | "The Dino or the Egg" | July 26, 2019 | May 22, 2019 | Brachiosaurus, Brachiosaurus Babies, Troodon, Troodon Babies, Spinosaurus, Maiasaura |
| 79 | 1 | "The Dino or the Egg" | July 26, 2019 | May 24, 2019 | Brachiosaurus, Brachiosaurus Babies, Troodon, Troodon Babies, Spinosaurus, Maiasaura |
| 80 | 2 | "Terror Birds" | July 26, 2019 | May 22, 2019 | Titanis/Corythosaurus, Giganotosaurus |
| 80 | 2 | "Napasaurus" | July 26, 2019 | May 25, 2019 | Titanis/Corythosaurus, Giganotosaurus |
| 81 | 3 | "Dino Knights" | July 26, 2019 | May 27, 2019 | Triceratops, Stygimoloch, Euoplocephalus/Incisivosaurus, Woolly Mammoth, Maiasaura |
| 81 | 3 | "Gnawed a Problem" | July 26, 2019 | May 29, 2019 | Triceratops, Stygimoloch, Euoplocephalus/Incisivosaurus, Woolly Mammoth, Maiasaura |
| 82 | 4 | "The Quick and the Dino" | July 26, 2019 | May 30, 2019 | Gigantoraptor, Giganotosaurus, Diplodocus/Triceratops, Sinornithosaurus, Dromaeosaurus, Tyrannosaurus rex, Triceratops Baby |
| 82 | 4 | "Nest Defence" | July 26, 2019 | May 31, 2019 | Gigantoraptor, Giganotosaurus, Diplodocus/Triceratops, Sinornithosaurus, Dromaeosaurus, Tyrannosaurus rex, Triceratops Baby |
| 83 | 5 | "Good Cop. Bad Dino" | July 26, 2019 | June 3, 2019 | Sinornithosaurus, Troodon, Titanoboa/Microraptor, Dromaeosaurus, Gigantoraptor |
| 83 | 5 | "Reach for the Tooth" | July 26, 2019 | June 05, 2019 | Sinornithosaurus, Troodon, Titanoboa/Microraptor, Dromaeosaurus, Gigantoraptor |
| 84 | 6 | "Dino Flyer" | July 26, 2019 | June 6, 2019 | Pterodactylus, Pterodactylus Baby/Troodon, Troodon Baby |
| 84 | 6 | "Dino Prints" | July 26, 2019 | June 07, 2019 | Pterodactylus, Pterodactylus Baby/Troodon, Troodon Baby |
| 85 | 7 | "Leader of the Pack" | July 26, 2019 | June 10, 2019 | Smilodon, Woolly Mammoth Baby, Woolly Mammoth, Titanis/Compsognathus, Incisivosaurus, Pterodactylus |
| 85 | 7 | "Dino Sitter" | July 26, 2019 | June 12, 2019 | Smilodon, Woolly Mammoth Baby, Woolly Mammoth, Titanis/Compsognathus, Incisivosaurus, Pterodactylus |
| 86 | 8 | "Shopping for Dinos" | July 26, 2019 | June 13, 2019 | Incisivosaurus, Dromaeosaurus/Europasaurus |
| 86 | 8 | "Dino Trouble" | July 26, 2019 | June 14, 2019 | Incisivosaurus, Dromaeosaurus/Europasaurus |
| 87 | 9 | "Dinostaurus" | July 26, 2019 | June 17, 2019 | Kosmoceratops, Maiasaura, Edmontosaurus, Edmontosaurus Baby, Incisivosaurus |
| 87 | 9 | "Hot and Cold Dino" | July 26, 2019 | June 19, 2019 | Kosmoceratops, Maiasaura, Edmontosaurus, Edmontosaurus Baby, Incisivosaurus |
| 88 | 10 | "Dino Territory" | July 26, 2019 | June 20, 2019 | Sinornithosaurus, Troodon/Megalodon, Plesiosaurus |
| 88 | 10 | "Prehistoric Predator" | July 26, 2019 | June 21, 2019 | Sinornithosaurus, Troodon/Megalodon, Plesiosaurus |
| 89 | 11 | "Mind Your Mammoth" | July 26, 2019 | June 24, 2019 | Woolly Mammoth, Woolly Mammoth Baby/Troodon Baby, Troodon |
| 89 | 11 | "Dino Catastrophe" | July 26, 2019 | June 26, 2019 | Woolly Mammoth, Woolly Mammoth Baby/Troodon Baby, Troodon |
| 90 | 12 | "Dinner-saur" | July 26, 2019 | June 27, 2019 | Archaeopteryx, Dromaeosaurus/Deinosuchus, Sinornithosaurus, Pterodaustro |
| 90 | 12 | "Dino Puppet Show" | July 26, 2019 | June 28, 2019 | Archaeopteryx, Dromaeosaurus/Deinosuchus, Sinornithosaurus, Pterodaustro |
| 91 | 13 | "The Dino-Zone" | July 26, 2019 | July 1, 2019 | Dromaeosaurus, Therizinosaurus, Megalodon, Tyrannosaurus rex |
| 91 | 13 | "The Dino-Zone" | July 26, 2019 | July 03, 2019 | Dromaeosaurus, Therizinosaurus, Megalodon, Tyrannosaurus rex |

=== Season 8 (Dino Dana) ===
| No. overall | No. in season | Segments | American Premiere (Amazon Prime Video) | Canadian Premiere (TVO Kids) | Dinosaurs |
|---|---|---|---|---|---|
| 92 | 1 | "Apexed" | April 17, 2020 | August 14, 2019 | Megalodon, Livyatan |
| 93 | 2 | "Dino Flies" | April 17, 2020 | August 15, 2019 | Meganeura/Microraptor, Archaeopteryx, Pterodactylus |
| 93 | 2 | "Winging It" | April 17, 2020 | August 15, 2019 | Meganeura/Microraptor, Archaeopteryx, Pterodactylus |
| 94 | 3 | "Flying Expectations" | April 17, 2020 | August 16, 2019 | Quetzalcoatlus, Compsognathus, Tyrannosaurus rex/Spinosaurus baby, Pterodaustro, Spinosaurus, Maiasaura |
| 94 | 3 | "Dino Talents" | April 17, 2020 | August 16, 2019 | Quetzalcoatlus, Compsognathus, Tyrannosaurus rex/Spinosaurus baby, Pterodaustro, Spinosaurus, Maiasaura |
| 95 | 4 | "Dancesaurus" | April 17, 2020 | August 19, 2019 | Incisivosaurus/Troodon baby, Brachiosaurus |
| 95 | 4 | "Dino Memories" | April 17, 2020 | August 19, 2019 | Incisivosaurus/Troodon baby, Brachiosaurus |
| 96 | 5 | "Dino in the Nest" | April 17, 2020 | August 20, 2019 | Albertosaurus, Albertosaurus baby/Woolly Mammoth, Woolly Mammoth baby, Smilodon |
| 96 | 5 | "Follow the Mammoth" | April 17, 2020 | August 20, 2019 | Albertosaurus, Albertosaurus baby/Woolly Mammoth, Woolly Mammoth baby, Smilodon |
| 97 | 6 | "Dino Feeder" | April 17, 2020 | August 21, 2019 | Spinosaurus, Edmontosaurus, Nanuqsaurus, Dromaeosaurus/Tyrannosaurus rex, Albertosaurus, Nanuqsaurus |
| 97 | 6 | "Tyrannosaur Test" | April 17, 2020 | August 21, 2019 | Spinosaurus, Edmontosaurus, Nanuqsaurus, Dromaeosaurus/Tyrannosaurus rex, Albertosaurus, Nanuqsaurus |
| 98 | 7 | "Tail Power" | April 17, 2020 | August 22, 2019 | Stegosaurus, Kentrosaurus, Euoplocephalus/Brontotherium |
| 98 | 7 | "Brontotherium and the Beast" | April 17, 2020 | August 22, 2019 | Stegosaurus, Kentrosaurus, Euoplocephalus/Brontotherium |
| 99 | 8 | "Dino Deep Freeze" | April 17, 2020 | August 23, 2019 | Nanuqsaurus, Dromaeosaurus, Incisivosaurus/Europasaurus, Dracorex, Hippodraco |
| 99 | 8 | "Dino Garden" | April 17, 2020 | August 23, 2019 | Nanuqsaurus, Dromaeosaurus, Incisivosaurus/Europasaurus, Dracorex, Hippodraco |
| 100 | 9 | "Prehistoric Hospital" | April 17, 2020 | August 26, 2019 | Titanis, Woolly Mammoth, Tyrannosaurus rex/Giganotosaurus, Albertosaurus, Troodon, Meganeura, Titanis, Nanuqsaurus, Ozraptor, Quetzalcoatlus, Compsognathus, Pterodactylus, Microraptor, Incisivosaurus, Dromaeosaurus, Titanoboa, Archaeopteryx |
| 100 | 9 | "Bugasaurus" | April 17, 2020 | August 26, 2019 | Titanis, Woolly Mammoth, Tyrannosaurus rex/Giganotosaurus, Albertosaurus, Troodon, Meganeura, Titanis, Nanuqsaurus, Ozraptor, Quetzalcoatlus, Compsognathus, Pterodactylus, Microraptor, Incisivosaurus, Dromaeosaurus, Titanoboa, Archaeopteryx |
| 101 | 10 | "Problem Cub" | April 17, 2020 | August 27, 2019 | Smilodon, Smilodon cub, Nanuqsaurus/Amargasaurus, Troodon, Tyrannosaurus rex |
| 101 | 10 | "Dino Dooties" | April 17, 2020 | August 27, 2019 | Smilodon, Smilodon cub, Nanuqsaurus/Amargasaurus, Troodon, Tyrannosaurus rex |
| 102 | 11 | "Dinosauroid" | April 17, 2020 | August 28, 2019 | Troodon/Albertosaurus, Ozraptor, Giganotosaurus, Tyrannosaurus rex |
| 102 | 11 | "Dino Dana Says" | April 17, 2020 | August 28, 2019 | Troodon/Albertosaurus, Ozraptor, Giganotosaurus, Tyrannosaurus rex |
| 103 | 12 | "Lovey Dovey Dinos" | April 17, 2020 | August 29, 2019 | Therizinosaurus/Compsognathus, Microraptor, Archaeopteryx |
| 103 | 12 | "Best Nest" | April 17, 2020 | August 29, 2019 | Therizinosaurus/Compsognathus, Microraptor, Archaeopteryx |
| 104 | 13 | "The Sound of Dinosaurs" | April 17, 2020 | August 30, 2019 | Eoraptor, Procompsognathus, Bellusaurus, Proceratosaurus, Amygdalodon, Eustreptospondylus, Diplodocus, Brachiosaurus, Ozraptor, Stegosaurus, Kentrosaurus, Triceratops, Euoplocephalus, Tyrannosaurus rex, Psittacosaurus, Zuul, Kosmoceratops, Stygimoloch, Dracorex, Amargasaurus, Futalognkosaurus, Hippodraco, Nanuqsaurus, Compsognathus, Maiasaura, Spinosaurus, Microraptor |
