= Sunshine Cleaning =

2008 film by Christine Jeffs

- Theatrical release poster
- Directed by: Christine Jeffs
- Written by: Megan Holley
- Produced by: Jeb Brody; Peter Saraf; Marc Turtletaub; Glenn Williamson
- Starring: Amy Adams; Emily Blunt; Jason Spevack; Mary Lynn Rajskub; Clifton Collins, Jr.; Eric Christian Olsen; Kevin Chapman; Steve Zahn; Alan Arkin
- Cinematography: John Toon
- Edited by: Heather Persons
- Music by: Michael Penn
- Production company: Big Beach
- Distributed by: Overture Films
- Release dates: January 18, 2008 (Sundance); March 13, 2009 (United States)
- Running time: 91 minutes
- Country: United States
- Language: English
- Budget: $5 million
- Box office: $17.3 million

Sunshine Cleaning is a 2008 American comedy-drama film written by Megan Holley and directed by Christine Jeffs. It stars Amy Adams, Emily Blunt, and Alan Arkin.

Produced by Big Beach, the film premiered at the Sundance Film Festival on January 18, 2008, and was given a limited theatrical release in the United States on March 13, 2009, by Overture Films. Sunshine Cleaning garnered positive reviews from critics and was a minor box-office hit, grossing $17.3 million against a $5 million budget. The film was released on DVD and Blu-ray on August 25, 2009.

== Plot ==
Rose Lorkowski is a 30-something single mother and full-time house cleaner. Her underachieving and unreliable sister, Norah, lives with their father, Joe, and is fired from her most current job. Rose's hyperactive and disruptive 8-year-old son, Oscar, upsets his school officials with his erratic behavior. They tell Rose to put him on medication or send him to a private school. Unable to earn enough with her current job, Rose asks Mac, her former high-school boyfriend and now-married lover, for advice. Mac recommends a crime scene cleanup job, using his connections as a police officer to get Rose and Norah into the business.

At first, the sisters are clueless as to how to properly perform their job. They are unlicensed and carelessly handle hazardous materials by throwing them into dumpsters instead of properly disposing of bio-waste in an incinerator. Needing to operate as a more reputable service, the sisters get the necessary tools from Winston, a one-armed storekeeper of a shop for cleanup material, who helps the sisters. The sisters name their business, "Sunshine Cleaning," and their reputation grows. They begin to find meaning in their function to "help" in some way in the aftermath of a loss or disaster, even though the job stirs recollections of their own mother's suicide. At the same time, family members deal with their individual problems. Rose encounters some of her former high school classmates and is embarrassed by her low status in life. After an encounter with Mac's pregnant wife in a gas station, in which she mocks Rose's post-high school life, Rose realizes that Mac will never leave his wife, and ends their relationship. Norah meets and becomes closer to Lynn, the daughter of a woman whose house they cleaned. Joe (who makes exaggerated promises) begins to sell shrimp independently, hoping to raise enough money to buy expensive binoculars Oscar wants for his birthday.

One day, an insurance company hires Sunshine Cleaning, giving the sisters a possible breakthrough for gaining steady lucrative jobs. Unfortunately for Rose, a baby shower is on the same day, with all her more prosperous high school classmates attending. She asks Norah to clean the house alone until she can catch up. Norah bungles her solitary cleaning assignment, as she accidentally burns down the house with an unattended candle. Their business reputation is tarnished and saddles them with a $40,000 debt which the sisters cannot pay. Sunshine Cleaning goes out of business, and Rose returns to being a house cleaner. Meanwhile, Joe's shrimp plan goes awry as stores and restaurants refuse to buy from an unlicensed food distributor for health and safety reasons.

Lynn breaks off her friendship with Norah, as she questions whether Norah was truly interested in her at all. At Oscar's birthday party, Norah apologizes to Rose, and despite still being mad, Rose forgives her. The family then celebrate Oscar's birthday with Winston, who seems quite taken with Rose.

Sometime later, Rose visits her father who says he's sold his house and with the money has started a new cleanup business named Lorkowski Cleaning. He asks Rose to be the knowledgeable managing partner, and she agrees. Norah finally shows independence by going on a road trip to find her new self, while Rose starts working with her father.

== Cast ==
- Amy Adams as Rose Lorkowski
- Emily Blunt as Norah Lorkowski
- Alan Arkin as Joe Lorkowski
- Jason Spevack as Oscar Lorkowski
- Steve Zahn as Mac
- Mary Lynn Rajskub as Lynn
- Clifton Collins Jr. as Winston
- Eric Christian Olsen as Randy
- Paul Dooley as Sherm
- Kevin Chapman as Carl Swanson
- Amy Redford as Heather

== Release and reception ==
Sunshine Cleaning was produced by independent film company Big Beach. On February 26, 2008, Variety reported that it was purchased by Overture Films for distribution. It received a small-scale release on March 13, 2009.

=== Box office ===
Box Office Mojo said the film showed promise earning $219,190 from four, an average of $54,798 per location, and made decent earnings when it expanded to 64 theaters the following weekend, earning a further $671,618. The film expanded to 167 theaters in its third week. By the end of its run it earned $12 million in North American and a further $5.3 million internationally, for a worldwide total of $17.3 million.

=== Critical response ===
Sunshine Cleaning received mostly positive reviews from critics. On Rotten Tomatoes, the film has a 74% approval rating based on 178 reviews, with an average score of 6.4/10. The website's critics consensus reads: "Despite a sometimes overly familiar plot, Sunshine Cleaning benefits from the lively performances of its two stars." On Metacritic, the film has an average score of 61 out of 100, based on 32 critics, indicating "generally favorable reviews".

Peter Travers of Rolling Stone gave the film 3 out of 4 stars, stating "This funny and touching movie depends on two can-do actresses to scrub past the biohazard of noxious clichés that threaten to intrude. Adams and Blunt get the job done. They come highly recommended." Betsy Sharkey of the Los Angeles Times deemed that "on the surface, Sunshine Cleaning...is an offbeat and oddly endearing drama, leavened with just the right amount of comedy to even things out".

The Times gave the film a mixed review, rating 3 out of 5 stars, saying "Given the subject matter ... it's remarkable that the movie still bobs along on a seemingly unquenchable current of sentimental optimism".

Critics praised the performances of the cast, especially Adams. Mick LaSalle of San Francisco Chronicle gave the film a positive review, saying: "The play of emotion on Amy Adams's face is the main reason to see Sunshine Cleaning." A. O. Scott of The New York Times wrote that the film "sometimes seems better than it is" because "Ms. Jeffs (Rain, Sylvia) has a good touch with actors and a very good cast. Amy Adams and Emily Blunt...attack their roles with vivacity and dedication, even if the roles themselves don't entirely make sense." Of Adams's portrayal of her character, Michael Sragow of The Baltimore Sun said, "Adams achieves perfect clarity, with a touch of the divine."

=== Awards ===
Year	Award	Category	Recipient(s)	Result
2008	Grand Jury Prize	Dramatic	Christine Jeffs	Nominated
2009	Satellite Awards	Best Actress in a Supporting Role	Emily Blunt	Nominated
2009	Casting Society of America	Outstanding Achievement in Casting - Low Budget Feature - Drama/Comedy	Avy Kaufman	Won
